= Bobsleigh at the 1932 Winter Olympics – Four-man =

The four-man bobsleigh results at the 1932 Winter Olympics in Lake Placid, New York, in the United States.

== Medallists ==
Gold	Silver	Bronze
United States; USA I Billy Fiske; Eddie Eagan; Clifford Gray; Jay O'Brien	United States; USA II; Henry Homburger; Percy Bryant; Francis Stevens; Edmund Horton	Germany; Germany I Hanns Kilian; Max Ludwig; Hans Mehlhorn; Sebastian Huber

== Results ==
Rank	Team	Athletes	Run 1	Run 2	Run 3	Run 4	Final
Gold	United States USA I	Billy Fiske, Eddie Eagan, Clifford Gray, & Jay O'Brien	2:00.52	1:59.16	1:57.41	1:56.59	7:53.68
Silver	United States USA II	Henry Homburger, Percy Bryant, Francis Stevens, & Edmund Horton	2:01.77	2:01.09	1:58.56	1:54.28	7:55.70
Bronze	Germany Germany I	Hanns Kilian, Max Ludwig, Hans Mehlhorn, & Sebastian Huber	2:03.11	2:01.34	1:58.19	1:57.40	8:00.04
4	Switzerland Switzerland II	Reto Capadrutt, Hans Eisenhut, Charles Jenny, & Oscar Geier	2:06.81	2:03.40	2:01.47	2:00.50	8:12.18
5	Italy Italy I	Teofilo Rossi di Montelera, Agostini Lanfranchi, Gaetano Lanfranchi & Italo Casini	2:07.87	2:06.62	2:07.94	2:01.78	8:24.21
6	Romania Romania I	Alexandru Papană, Alexandru Ionescu, Ulise Petrescu, & Dumitru Hubert	2:09.09	2:14.32	2:02.00	1:58.81	8:24.22
7	Germany Germany II	Walther von Mumm, Hasso von Bismarck, Gerhard von Hessert, & Georg Gyssling	2:11.59	2:11.72	2:07.89	2:04.25	8:35.45
