= Bobsleigh at the 1932 Winter Olympics =

Bobsleigh at the III Olympic Winter Games
- Venue: Lake Placid, New York
- Dates: 9-15 February 1932
- Competitors: 41 from 8 nations

At the 1932 Winter Olympics, two bobsleigh events were contested. The competitions were held from February 9, 1932 to February 15, 1932. Events were held at the Lake Placid bobsleigh, luge, and skeleton track.

== Medal summary ==
Event	Gold	Silver	Bronze
Two-man	United States; USA I Hubert Stevens; Curtis Stevens	Switzerland; Switzerland II; Reto Capadrutt; Oscar Geier	United States; USA II; John Heaton; Robert Minton
Four-man	United States; USA I Billy Fiske; Edward Eagan; Clifford Gray; Jay O'Brien	United States; USA II; Henry Homburger; Percy Bryant; Francis Stevens; Edmund Horton	Germany; Germany I Hanns Kilian; Max Ludwig; Hans Mehlhorn; Sebastian Huber

== Participating nations ==
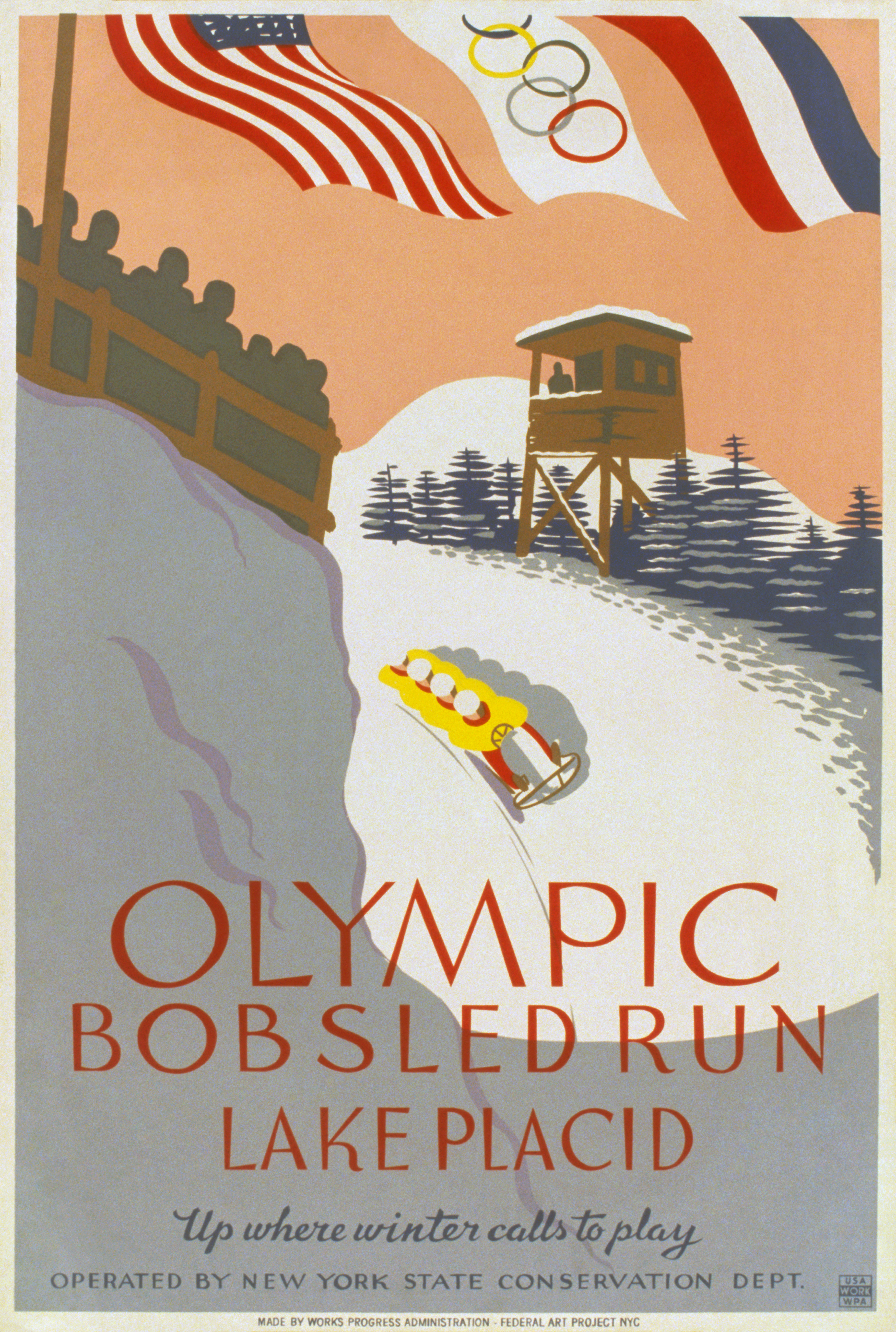
A Works Progress Administration poster advertising the Lake Placid bobsled run

Eleven bobsledders competed in both events.

A total of 41 bobsledders from eight nations competed at the Lake Placid Games:

- Austria (2)
- Belgium (4)
- France (2)
- Germany (9)
- Italy (4)
- Romania (4)
- Switzerland (4)
- United States (12)

== Medal table ==
Rank	Nation	Gold	Silver	Bronze	Total
1	United States	2	1	1	4
2	Switzerland	0	1	0	1
3	Germany	0	0	1	1
Totals (3 entries)		2	2	2	6
