= Germany at the 1932 Winter Olympics =

- IOC code: GER
- NOC: German Olympic Committee

in Lake Placid
- Competitors: 20 (men) in 3 sports
- Flag bearer: Martin Schröttle
- Medals Ranked 9th: Gold 0 Silver 0 Bronze 2 Total 2

Winter Olympics appearances (overview)
- 1928; 1932; 1936; 1948; 1952; 1956–1988; 1992; 1994; 1998; 2002; 2006; 2010; 2014; 2018; 2022; 2026

Other related appearances
- United Team of Germany (1956–1964); East Germany (1968–1988); West Germany (1968–1988)

Germany participated at the 1932 Winter Olympics in Lake Placid, United States, held between 4 and 13 February 1932. The country's participation in the Games marked its second appearance at the Winter Olympics since its debut in the previous Games.

The German team consisted of 20 athletes who competed across three sports. Ice hockey player Martin Schröttle was the country's flag-bearer during the opening ceremony. Germany was ranked ninth in the overall medal table with two bronze medals.

== Background ==
Germany competed in the Olympic Games since the inaugural edition of the Summer Olympics in 1896. However, the nation was not allowed to participate in the inaugural Winter Olympics held in 1924 in France as a consequence of the First World War. Hence, the nation made its debut in the Winter Olympics at the second Games held in 1928 held in St. Moritz, Switzerland. This edition of the Games marked the nation's second appearance at the Winter Games.

The 1932 Winter Olympics in Lake Placid, United States, held between 4 and 13 February 1932. The German delegation consisted of 20 athletes competing across three sports. Ice hockey player Martin Schröttle was the country's flag-bearer in the Parade of Nations during the opening ceremony. Germany was ranked ninth in the overall medal table with two bronze medals.

== Medalists ==
Medal	Name	Sport	Event
Bronze	Hanns Kilian; Max Ludwig; Hans Mehlhorn; Sebastian Huber	Bobsleigh	Four-man
Bronze	Germany men's national ice hockey team: Rudi Ball; Alfred Heinrich; Erich Herker; Gustav Jaenecke; Werner Korff; Walter Leinweber; Erich Römer; Martin Schröttle; Marquardt Slevogt; Georg Strobl	Ice hockey	Men's competition

== Competitors ==
There were 20 athletes (all men) who took part in the medal events across three sports.

Sport	Men	Women	Athletes
Bobsleigh	9	0	9
Figure skating	1	0	1
Ice hockey	10	0	10
Total	20	0	20

== Bobsleigh ==
Bobsleigh competitions were held between 8 and 15 February at Mt. Van Hoevenberg Recreation Area in Lake Placid. Germany entered nine athletes across two events in the competition. In the two-man event, the best placed team of Hanns Kilian and Sebastian Huber finished fifth. In the subsequent four-man event, the German team of Kilian, Huber, Max Ludwig, and Hans Mehlhorn won the bronze medal with a combined time of just over eight minutes across four runs.

Sled	Athletes	Event	Run 1		Run 2		Run 3		Run 4		Total	
Sled	Athletes	Event	Time	Rank	Time	Rank	Time	Rank	Time	Rank	Time	Rank
GER-1	Hanns Kilian; Sebastian Huber	Two-man	2:15.27	5	2:11.08	6	2:05.82	4	2:03.19	5	8:35.36	5
GER-2	Werner Huth; Max Ludwig	Two-man	2:11.53	2	2:11.58	7	2:11.32	9	2:10.62	10	8:45.05	7

Sled	Athletes	Event	Run 1		Run 2		Run 3		Run 4		Total	
Sled	Athletes	Event	Time	Rank	Time	Rank	Time	Rank	Time	Rank	Time	Rank
GER-1	Hanns Kilian; Max Ludwig; Hans Mehlhorn; Sebastian Huber	Four-man	2:03.11	3	2:01.34	3	1:58.19	2	1:57.40	3	8:00.04	3rd place, bronze medalist(s)
GER-2	Walther von Mumm; Hasso von Bismarck; Gerhard von Hessert; Georg Gyssling	Four-man	2:11.59	7	2:11.72	6	2:07.89	6	2:04.25	7	8:35.45	7

== Figure skating ==
Figure skating competitions were held on 8 and 9 February at the Olympic Arena. As per the terms of the competition, the skaters were ranked by every judge from first through last place, which were based on the points awarded with 60% for Compulsory Figures and 40% for Free Skating. The final placement was determined by a Majority Placement rule with the ranks tallied together. Ernst Baier was the lone competitor for Germany in the competition and was ranked fifth in the final classification.

Athlete	Event	CF	FS	Places	Points	Final rank
Ernst Baier	Men's singles	6	5	35	2334.8	5

== Ice hockey ==
Ice hockey competitions were held between 4 and 13 February at James C. Sheffield Speed Skating Oval and Olympic Arena. There were only four teams in the competition, and each team played the other twice in a round robin tournament. The German team won two matches, both of them against Poland to secure third place and a bronze medal.

Squad

Germany
Rudi Ball (Berliner SC)
Alfred Heinrich (SC Brandenburg Berlin)
Erich Herker (Berliner SC)
Gustav Jaenecke (Berliner SC)
Werner Korff (Berliner SC)
Walter Leinweber (EV Füssen)
Erich Römer (Berliner SC)
Martin Schröttle (SC Riessersee)
Marquardt Slevogt (SC Riessersee)
Georg Strobl (SC Riessersee)

Group stage

Team	GP	W	L	T	GF	GA
Canada	6	5	0	1	32	4
United States	6	4	1	1	27	5
Germany (bronze)	6	2	4	0	7	26
Poland	6	0	6	0	3	34

4 February 1932

Germany	4–0	Poland

6 February 1932

Germany	1–4	Canada

7 February 1932

Germany	0–7	United States

8 February 1932

Germany	0–5	Canada

10 February 1932

Germany	0–8	United States

13 February 1932

Germany	4–1	Poland
