= Bobsleigh at the 1932 Winter Olympics – Two-man =

The two-man bobsleigh results at the 1932 Winter Olympics in Lake Placid.

== Medallists ==
Gold	Silver	Bronze
United States; USA I Hubert Stevens; Curtis Stevens	Switzerland; Switzerland II; Reto Capadrutt; Oscar Geier	United States; USA II; John Heaton; Robert Minton

== Results ==
Rank	Team	Athletes	Run 1	Run 2	Run 3	Run 4	Final
Gold	United States USA I	Hubert Stevens & Curtis Stevens	2:13.10	2:04.27	1:59.69	1:57.68	8:14.74
Silver	Switzerland Switzerland II	Reto Capadrutt & Oscar Geier	2:05.88	2:07.21	2:03.52	1:59.67	8:16.28
Bronze	United States USA II	John Heaton & Robert Minton	2:15.02	2:07.51	2:04.29	2:02.33	8:29.15
4	Romania Romania I	Alexandru Papană & Dumitru Hubert	2:15.51	2:07.82	2:06.12	2:03.02	8:32.47
5	Germany Germany I	Hanns Kilian & Sebastian Huber	2:15.27	2:11.08	2:05.82	2:03.19	8:35.36
6	Italy Italy I	Teofilo Rossi di Montelera & Italo Casini	2:15.45	2:08.10	2:06.58	2:06.20	8:36.33
7	Germany Germany II	Werner Huth & Max Ludwig	2:11.53	2:11.58	2:11.32	2:10.62	8:45.05
8	Italy Italy II	Agostino Lanfranchi & Gaetano Lanfranchi	2:20.08	2:13.47	2:08.00	2:09.11	8:50.66
9	Belgium Belgium I	Max Houben & Louis Van Hege	2:17.68	2:14.90	2:10.90	2:09.62	8:53.10
10	Belgium Belgium II	Christian Hansez & Jacques Maus	2:17.01	2:16.74	2:13.59	2:13.81	9:01.15
11	France France I	Louis Balsan & Daniel Armand-Delille	2:20.10	2:19.37	2:13.56	2:09.56	9:02.59
12	Austria Austria I	Hugo Weinstengl & Johann Baptist Gudenus	2:23.83	2:21.82	2:16.19	2:14.58	9:16.42
