= Switzerland at the 1932 Winter Olympics =

- IOC code: SUI
- NOC: Swiss Olympic Association
- Website: www.swissolympic.ch (in German and French)

in Lake Placid
- Competitors: 7 (men) in 3 sports
- Medals Ranked 8th: Gold 0 Silver 1 Bronze 0 Total 1

Winter Olympics appearances (overview)
- 1924; 1928; 1932; 1936; 1948; 1952; 1956; 1960; 1964; 1968; 1972; 1976; 1980; 1984; 1988; 1992; 1994; 1998; 2002; 2006; 2010; 2014; 2018; 2022; 2026

Switzerland competed at the 1932 Winter Olympics in Lake Placid, United States.

== Medalists ==
Medal	Name	Sport	Event
Silver	Reto Capadrutt; Oscar Geier	Bobsleigh	Two-man

== Bobsleigh ==
Sled	Athletes	Event	Run 1		Run 2		Run 3		Run 4		Total	
Sled	Athletes	Event	Time	Rank	Time	Rank	Time	Rank	Time	Rank	Time	Rank
SUI-1	Reto Capadrutt; Oscar Geier	Two-man	2:05.88	1	2:07.21	2	2:03.52	2	1:59.67	2	8:16.28	2nd place, silver medalist(s)

Sled	Athletes	Event	Run 1		Run 2		Run 3		Run 4		Total	
Sled	Athletes	Event	Time	Rank	Time	Rank	Time	Rank	Time	Rank	Time	Rank
SUI-1	Reto Capadrutt; Hans Eisenhut; Charles Jenny; Oscar Geier	Four-man	2:06.81	4	2:03.40	4	2:01.47	4	2:00.50	5	8:12.18	4

== Nordic combined ==
Events:

- 18 km cross-country skiing
- normal hill ski jumping

The cross-country skiing part of this event was combined with the main medal event of cross-country skiing. Some athletes (but not all) entered in both the cross-country skiing and Nordic combined event, their time on the 18 km was used for both events.

The ski jumping (normal hill) event was held separate from the main medal event of ski jumping, results can be found in the table below.

Athlete	Event	Cross-country			Ski Jumping				Total	
Athlete	Event	Time	Points	Rank	Distance 1	Distance 2	Total points	Rank	Points	Rank
Fritz Kaufmann	Individual	1'59:20	97.50	32	59.5	60.5	223.2	1	320.70	23
Cesare Chiogna	Individual	1'58:33	102.00	30	58.0	59.5	219.6	4	321.60	22
Fritz Steuri	Individual	1'54:57	115.50	26	51.0	51.0	200.4	11	315.90	26

== Ski jumping ==
Athlete	Event	Jump 1			Jump 2			Total	
Athlete	Event	Distance	Points	Rank	Distance	Points	Rank	Points	Rank
Fritz Steuri	Normal hill	58.0	97.6	15	53.5	94.8	20	192.4	18
Cesare Chiogna	Normal hill	60.0	102.1	9	63.0	107.7	9	209.8	9
Fritz Kaufmann	Normal hill	63.5	106.5	6	65.5	109.3	5	215.8	6
