= Louis Balsan =

French bobsledder, mountain climber and writer (1911–1982)

Personal information
- Full name: Charles Jean Louis Balsan
- Nationality: French
- Born: 22 October 1911 Paris, France
- Died: 22 May 1982 (aged 70) Ballainvilliers, France

Sport
- Sport: Bobsleigh

Louis Balsan (22 October 1911 – 22 May 1982) was a French bobsledder who competed in the 1930s. He later became a writer in the 1950s, discussing his involvement in World War II espionage and the history of mountain climbing in the Pyrenees. He was born in Paris.

== Bobsleigh career ==
Competing in two Winter Olympics, Balsan earned his best finish of ninth in the four-man event at Garmisch-Partenkirchen in 1936. At the 1932 Winter Olympics he and Daniel Armand-Delille finished eleventh in the two-man event

== Other activities ==
Balsan was later arrested by the Gestapo in 1942 during World War II for participating in resistance activities. He was taken to Mauthausen and then Loibl Pass, until the 8th Army (UK) liberated the area in 1945. He wrote a testimony of his life in concentration camps in Le Ver Luisant. Other books written by fellow prisoners include Karawanken (memoirs of Gaston Charlet) and The Tunnel (a novel based on the author's experiences). the history of mountain climbing in the Pyrennes. Balsan died in 1982.
