= Billy Fiske =

American bobsledder and fighter pilot

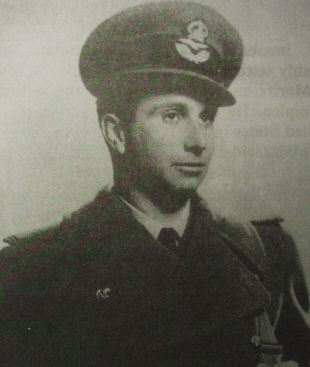
- Born: William Meade Lindsley Fiske III; 4 June 1911; Chicago, Illinois, U.S.
- Died: 17 August 1940 (aged 29); Chichester, England
- Burial place: St Mary and St Blaise churchyard in Boxgrove, Sussex
- Education: Trinity Hall, Cambridge (MA)
- Relatives: Jennison Heaton (brother-in-law)
- Military career
- Allegiance: United Kingdom
- Branch: Royal Air Force Volunteer Reserve
- Service years: 23 March 1940 – 17 August 1940
- Rank: Acting Pilot Officer
- Nickname: Billy
- Unit: No. 601 Squadron RAF
- Conflicts: World War II: Battle of Britain (DOW)
- Sports career
Medal record
Men's bobsleigh
Representing the United States
Gold medal – first place	1928 St. Moritz	Five-man
Gold medal – first place	1932 Lake Placid	Four-man

William Meade Lindsley Fiske III (4 June 1911 – 17 August 1940) was an American combat fighter pilot and Olympic bobsledder. At the 1928 and 1932 Winter Olympics, Fiske won gold as driver for the US bobsledding team, also acting as the American Olympic flagbearer in 1932.

When World War II broke out in 1939, Fiske traveled to the UK and joined the Royal Air Force Volunteer Reserve, claiming to be Canadian in order to be permitted to enlist. He would participate in the Battle of Britain, before being killed in action on 17 August 1940. After Jimmy Davies, Fiske was the second American-born pilot killed in action during World War II, but Fiske has the distinction of being the first American-citizen pilot to be killed in action during World War II. His plaque was unveiled in the crypt of St Paul's Cathedral, London. The inscription reads: An American citizen who died that England might live.

Between his Olympic career and his military service, Fiske was instrumental in the early development of the Aspen ski resort. Fiske and his partner built the first ski lift and lodge in the remote Colorado mountain town. Others would continue their work after the war.

== Early life ==
Fiske was born in Chicago in 1911, the son of Beulah and William Fiske, a New England banking magnate. He attended school in Chicago, and then went to school in France in 1924, where he discovered the sport of bobsled at the age of 16. Fiske attended Trinity Hall, Cambridge, in 1928 where he studied economics and history.

In 1936 Ted Ryan, an heir of Thomas Fortune Ryan, brought some photographs of mountains near Aspen, Colorado, to Fiske. They had been given to Ryan by a man trying to interest him in investing in a mining claim. Fiske and Ryan, however, saw in them ideal terrain for downhill skiing, and the ski resort the pair had been talking about establishing in the United States, similar to those in the Alps where Fiske had competed in the Olympics.

Fiske and Ryan visited Aspen, then a faded mining town decades removed from its boomtown years in the 1880s. Many of the abandoned properties around town were available for very low prices. Fiske bought an option on one, and he and Ryan had blueprints drawn up for a ski lodge. For the next season, they hired guides, including Swiss ski champion André Roch, then studying at Reed College in Oregon. The lodge opened at the end of 1937, and a few weeks later the Boat Tow, an early ski lift, opened. These events are considered the beginning of skiing in Aspen.

Fiske then worked at the London office of Dillon, Reed & Co, the New York bankers. Fiske married Rose Bingham, Countess of Warwick, in Maidenhead.

== Bobsled career ==
In 1928, as driver of the first five-man US Bobsled team to win the Olympics, Fiske became the youngest gold medalist in any winter sport (he was not eclipsed until 1992 by Toni Nieminen), aged just 16 years at the 1928 Winter Olympics in St. Moritz, Switzerland. His American team-mates were Geoffrey Mason, Nion Tucker, Clifford Gray and Richard Parke.

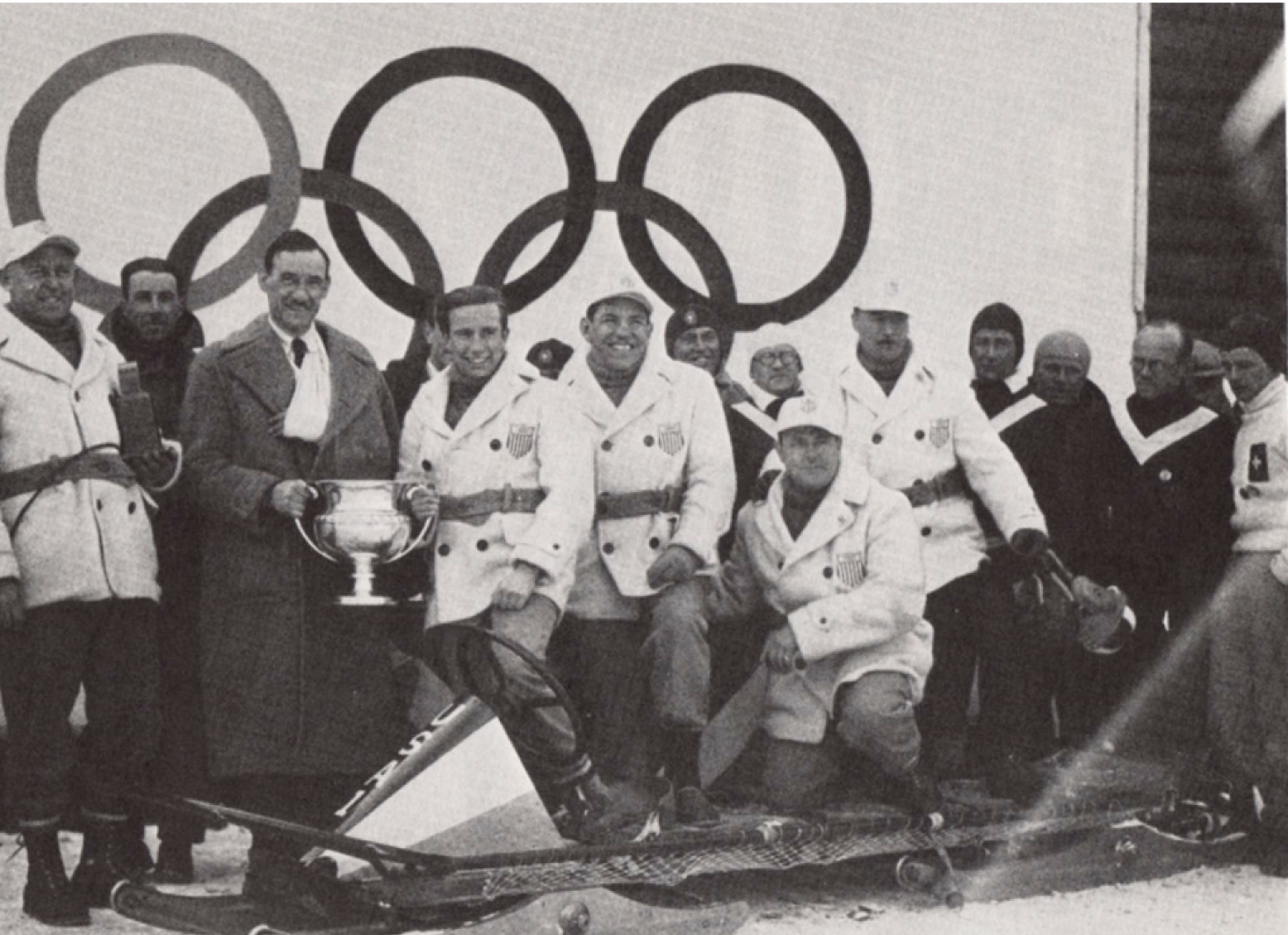
Billy Fiske with his gold medal-winning team in 1932.

Fiske competed again at the 1932 Winter Olympics at Lake Placid, New York, USA, where he carried the United States' flag at the opening ceremony. The format of the race was altered to a four-man team, but again Fiske and his team-mates, Clifford Gray, Eddie Eagan, and Jay O'Brien took gold.

Fiske was invited, but declined to lead the bobsled team in the 1936 Winter Olympics in Garmisch-Partenkirchen in Germany. It is believed by some that this decision was due to his disagreeing with the politics in Germany at the time, which may also explain his later decision to join the war effort in 1940.

Fiske was also a Cresta Champion, and was well known for jumps from the Badrutt's Palace Hotel's bar chandelier in St. Moritz.

== World War II ==
Shortly before the outbreak of World War II, Fiske was recalled to the New York offices of Dillon, Reed & Co, but on 30 August 1939 he returned to England aboard the Aquitania accompanying a bank colleague who was also a member of No. 601 (County of London) Auxiliary Air Force Squadron. Fiske was one of seven US aircrew personnel who fought in the Battle of Britain, although due to the neutrality of the United States, Fiske pretended to be a Canadian. He joined the Royal Air Force Volunteer Reserve and was promoted to the rank of Pilot Officer on 23 March 1940.

Fiske undertook his flying training at No. 10 Elementary Flying Training School at RAF Yatesbury, Wiltshire, before moving to RAF Brize Norton, Oxfordshire, for advanced flying training. As an American citizen, he "duly pledged his life and loyalty to the king, George VI," and was formally admitted into the RAF. In his diary, a joyous Fiske wrote, "I believe I can lay claim to being the first U.S. citizen to join the RAF in England after the outbreak of hostilities."

On 12 July 1940, Fiske joined No. 601 Squadron RAF, a Hawker Hurricane unit, at RAF Tangmere, West Sussex, the so-called "Millionaires' Squadron", carrying out his first sorties with the squadron on 20 July, when he flew two patrols. On 16 August 1940, in the midst of the Battle of Britain, No. 601 Squadron RAF were scrambled to intercept a squadron of German dive-bombers. Fiske was flying Hurricane serial number P3358. The Squadron destroyed eight Junkers Ju 87 Stukas, but after just 15 minutes of flying time, a German gunner put a bullet through Fiske's fuel tank.

With his aircraft badly damaged and his hands and ankles burnt, instead of bailing out, Fiske nursed his Hurricane home, gliding over a hedgerow to the airfield. Although he landed his aircraft safely back at Tangmere, Fiske had to be extracted from the aircraft by ambulance attendants. Shortly after, his fuel tank exploded. Fiske was taken to the Royal West Sussex Hospital in Chichester for treatment, but he died from surgical shock shortly afterwards, on 17 August. Fiske was 29 years old.

Fiske's funeral took place on 20 August 1940. Six members of Tangmere's ground staff carried Fiske to his final resting place. His coffin, covered in the Union Jack and the Stars and Stripes, was borne on a bier to Boxgrove Priory Church and buried.

Of Fiske's role in the Battle of Britain, Bill Bond, founder of the Battle of Britain Historical Society, wrote:

...although Billy made several sorties he didn't shoot anything down, so that his impact on the battle in that respect was negligible, but he is most definitely still very much a hero in our book.

Fiske's Flight Commander, Sir Archibald Hope, added:

Unquestionably Billy Fiske was the best pilot I've ever known. It was unbelievable how good he was. He picked up so fast it wasn't true. He'd flown a bit before, but he was a natural as a fighter pilot. He was also terribly nice and extraordinarily modest, and fitted into the squadron very well.

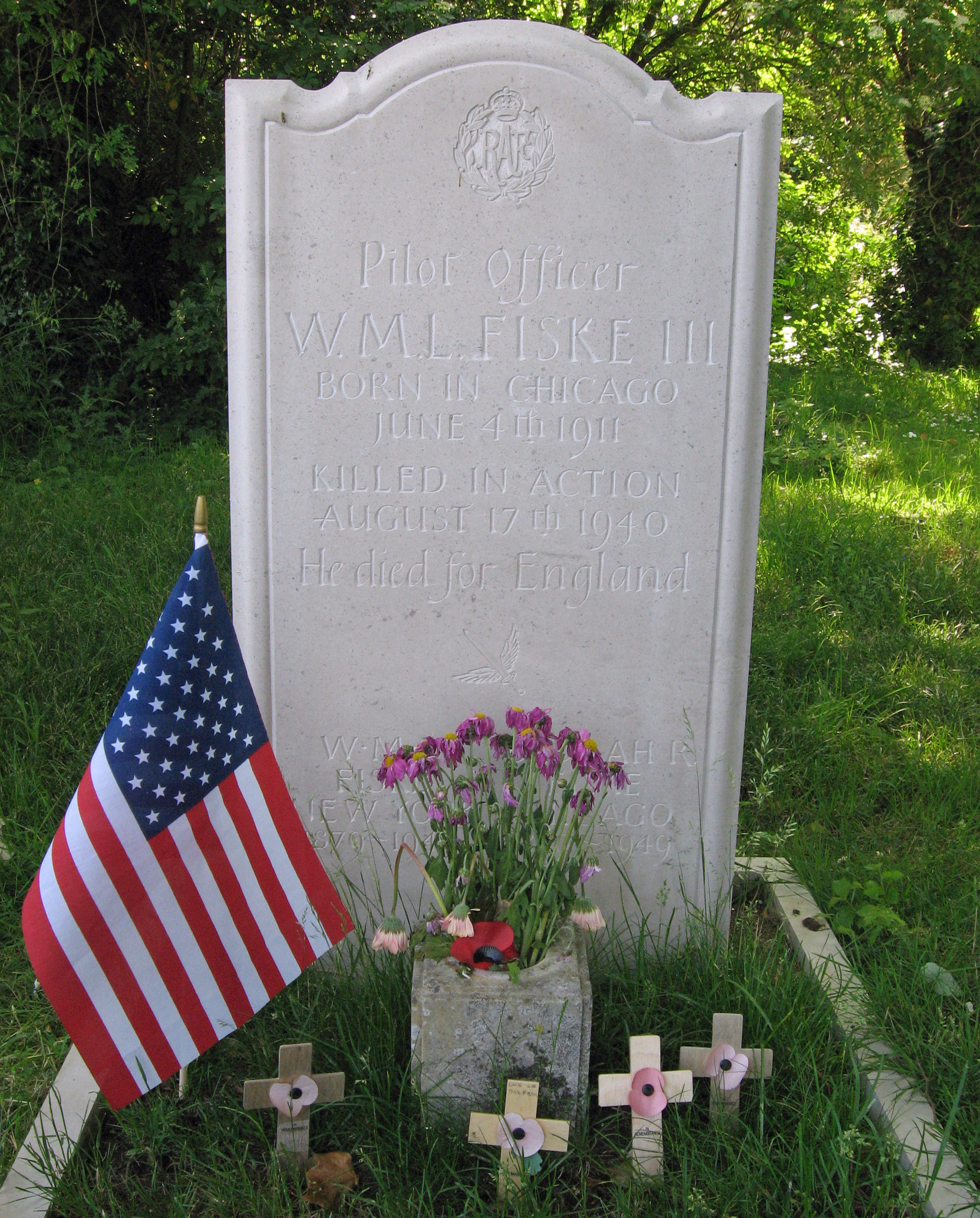
The grave of William Meade Lindsley "Billy" Fiske III

== Memorials and tributes ==
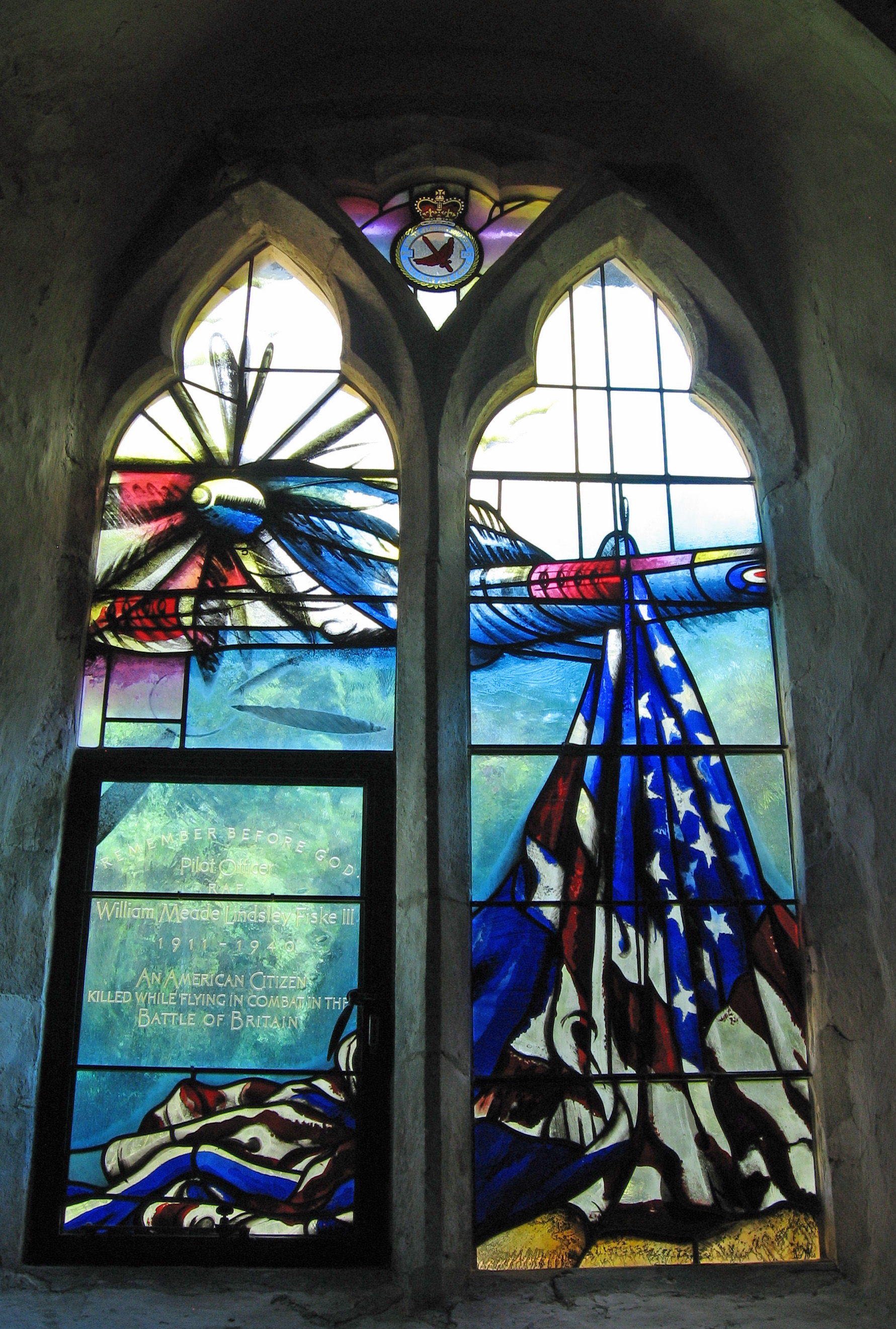
William Meade Lindsley "Billy" Fiske III stained glass window at Boxgrove Priory

Fiske is buried in St Mary and St Blaise churchyard in Boxgrove, Sussex. The inscription on his gravestone reads simply: He died for England. The funeral was publicized for propaganda purposes. A memorial stained glass window was dedicated to him on 17 September 2008 at Boxgrove Priory. At the dedication service, a number of former colleagues attended and his green Bentley car was on display. Fiske is listed on the Battle of Britain Monument in London and the Battle of Britain Memorial, Capel-le-Ferne.

On 4 July 1941, a plaque was unveiled in the crypt of St Paul's Cathedral, London. The inscription reads: An American citizen who died that England might live. The decision to unveil this plaque on American Independence Day was probably a political one; the United States had not officially joined the war and the British Prime Minister, Winston Churchill, was keen to popularise Fiske's story. The plaque was unveiled by Sir Archibald Sinclair, the Secretary of State for Air. He said at the ceremony:

Here was a young man for whom life held much. Under no kind of compulsion he came to fight for Britain. He came and he fought and he died.

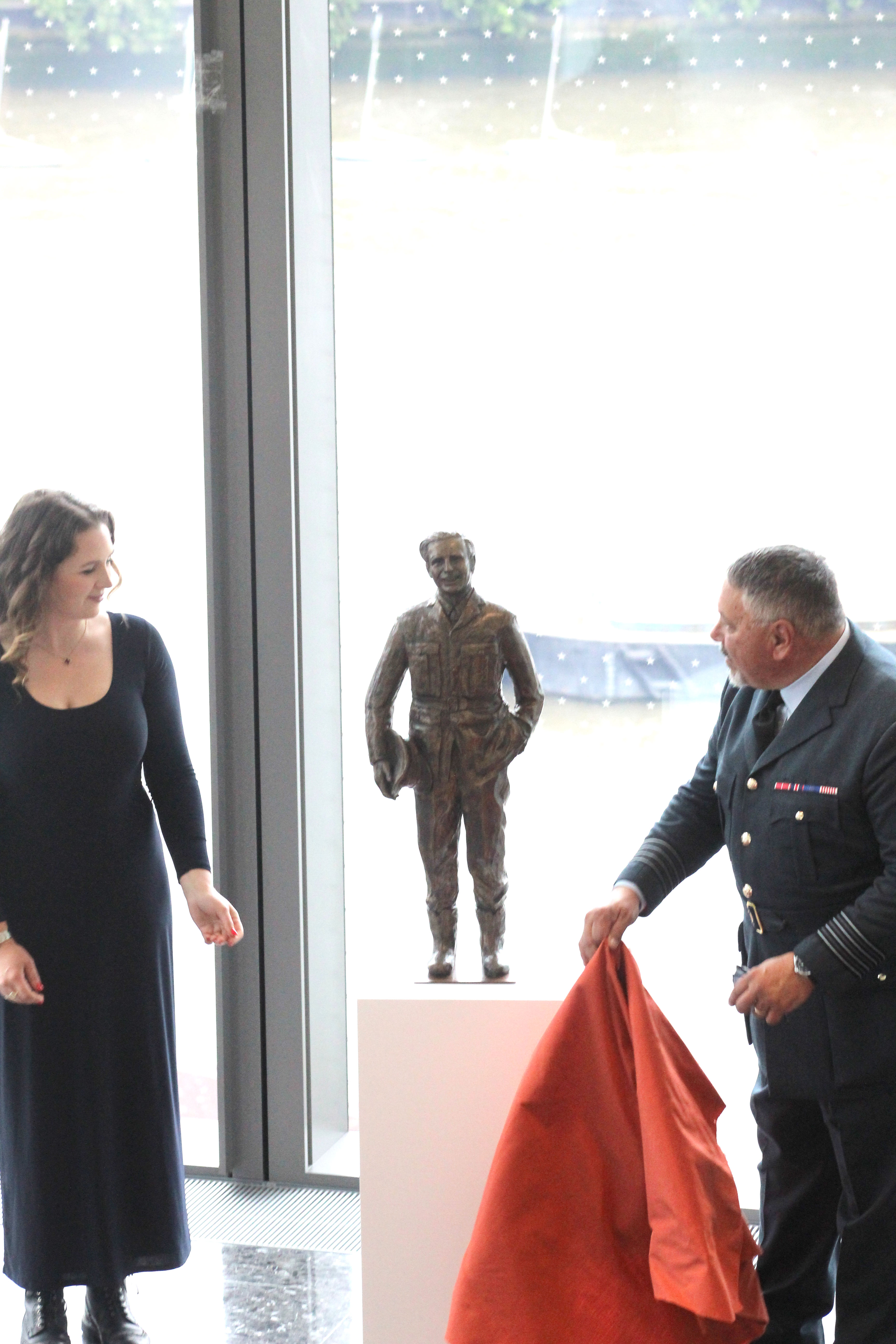
Artist Jenna Gearing and Kevin Billings unveil the Billy Fiske statue.

Other tributes to Fiske include a memorial tablet dedicated to him in the crypt of the Cathedral of Saint John the Divine, New York. The United States Bobsled and Skeleton Federation also created the Billy Fiske Memorial Trophy as a posthumous tribute to him. The trophy is awarded to the national champion four-man bobsled team each year.

As of 2003, a Hollywood film named The Few was in preparation for release in 2008, based on the story of Fiske. Bill Bond, who conceived the Battle of Britain Monument in London, described a Variety magazine outline of the film's historical content as "Totally wrong. The whole bloody lot." In addition to a 2005 documentary (American Warrior: Billy Fiske), Red Valley Productions performed a new play based on his life called Billy Fiske: King of Speed at the Alexandra Theatre, Bognor Regis from 20 to 25 July 2010.

On 4 June 2024 the Billy Fiske Foundation unveiled and dedicated the Billy Fiske statue at the U.S. Embassy in London, UK. Remarks were presented at the private event by The Honorable Matthew W Barzun, 66th Ambassador to the Court of St James, sculptor Jenna Gearing as well as by Billy Fiske Foundation president Kevin Billings. Gearing was commissioned to create the work of art, which is sculpted in bronze. The statue will reside inside the embassy, at the entrance to the Office of Defense Cooperation.

In 2025, the Board of the Billy Fiske Foundation formed a partnership with Trinity Hall, University of Cambridge, to create the Billy Fiske Centenary Scholarship. Meant to honour Billy Fiske's legacy, 100 years on from when he enrolled at the College, by supporting a Masters studentship. Trinity Hall is fundraising in conjunction with the Billy Fiske Foundation to support an American student coming to Trinity Hall, to study in October 2028, for a master's degree course in any subject. This effort will thereby help in the aim to strengthen the relationship between the United States and the United Kingdom.

== See also ==
- List of RAF aircrew in the Battle of Britain
- Non-British personnel in the RAF during the Battle of Britain § United States

Olympic Games
Preceded by Bud Houser	Flagbearer for United States; Lake Placid 1932	Succeeded by Morgan Taylor
