= Ulise Petrescu =

Romanian bobsledder

Ulise Petrescu (born August 9, 1902, date of death unknown) was a Romanian bobsledder who competed in the early 1930s. He finished sixth in the four-man event at the 1932 Winter Olympics in Lake Placid. He was born in Bucharest.
