= Eddie Eagan =

American Olympic athlete (1897–1967)

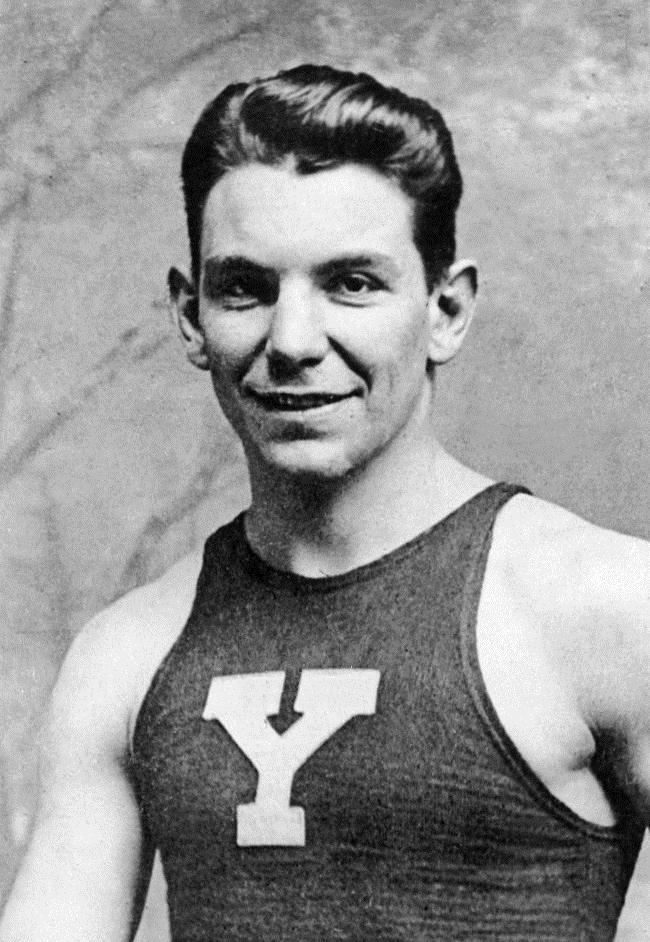
- Eagan c. 1920

Personal information
- Full name: Edward Patrick Francis Eagan
- Born: April 26, 1897 Denver, Colorado, U.S.
- Died: June 14, 1967 (aged 70) New York City, U.S.
- Education: Yale University; Harvard University; University of Oxford
- Height: 5 ft 10 in (178 cm)

Sport
- Sport: Boxing, bobsleigh
- Club: Yale Bulldogs, New Haven
Medal record
Representing the United States
Boxing
Summer Olympics
Gold medal – first place	1920 Antwerp	Light-heavyweight
Bobsleigh
Winter Olympics
Gold medal – first place	1932 Lake Placid	Four-man

Edward Patrick Francis Eagan (April 26, 1897 – June 14, 1967) was an American athlete who won a gold medal as a light-heavyweight boxer at the 1920 Summer Olympics and a gold medal in four-man bobsled at the 1932 Winter Olympics. Few athletes have competed in both the Summer and Winter Olympic games; Eagan is the only one to have won gold in each in different events. (Note: Gillis Grafström won gold in the Summer and Winter Olympic Games but in the same event: figure skating, which was contested at the 1920 Summer Olympics.)

== Early life ==
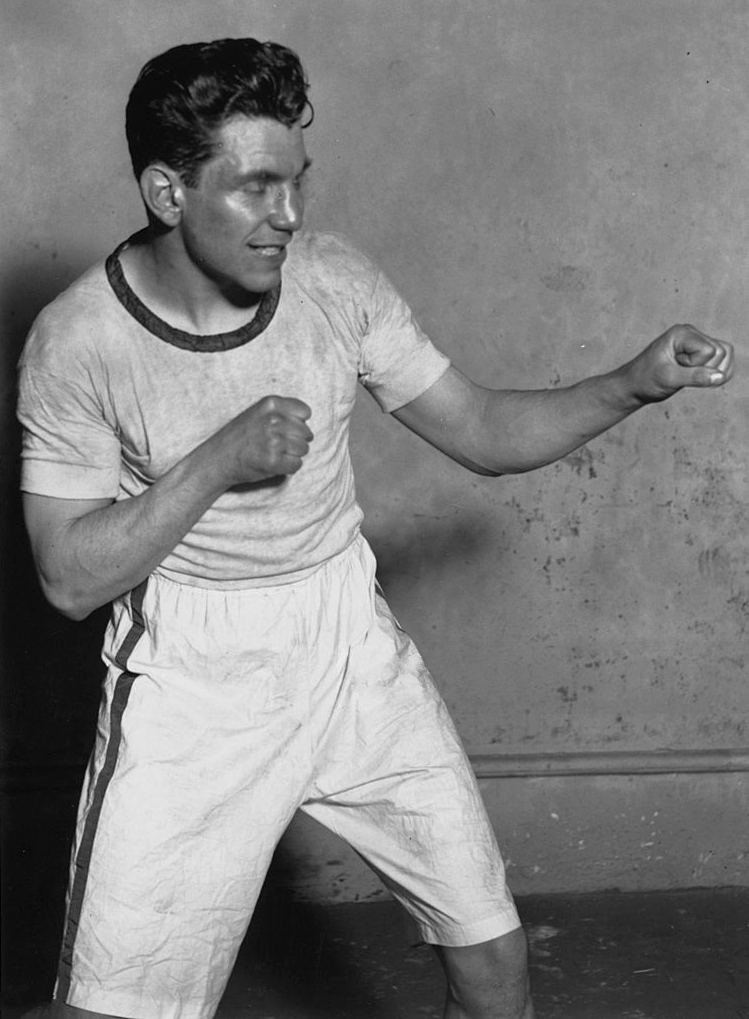
Eagan in London in 1923

Eagan was born into a modest family in Denver, Colorado. He graduated from Longmont High School and attended college at Denver University for one year, during which time he won the western middleweight boxing title. During World War I he was an artillery lieutenant and was the middleweight champion of the American Expeditionary Forces. After the war he attended Yale University. In 1919, he won the AAU's heavyweight title. After graduating from Yale in 1921, Eagan attended Harvard Law School and the University of Oxford. In 1923 he won Amateur Boxing Association heavyweight title.

Eagan wrote in his autobiography about how he had modeled his behavior after Frank Merriwell, a fictional athlete from Yale who was the subject of hundreds of widely read dime novels: "To this day I have never used tobacco, because Frank Merriwell didn't. My first glass of wine, which I do not care for, was taken under social compulsion in Europe. Frank never drank."

== Olympics ==
=== Summer Olympics ===
In 1920, he competed as a boxer at the 1920 Summer Olympics in Antwerp, and won the gold medal in the light-heavyweight division. He also competed at the 1924 Summer Olympics, but this time as a heavyweight. He failed to medal, having lost in the first round to Arthur Clifton (see Boxing at the 1924 Summer Olympics - Men's heavyweight).

=== Winter Olympics ===
Eagan returned to the Olympics eight years later, this time as a member of the bobsled crew of Billy Fiske, who steered to victory at the 1932 Winter Olympics in Lake Placid. Eagan became the first of six Olympians to medal in both the Winter and Summer Games, followed by Jacob Tullin Thams (Norway), Christa Luding-Rothenburger (East Germany), Clara Hughes (Canada), and Lauryn Williams (United States). Eddy Alvarez joined Eagan and Williams in 2020 as the only Americans to win medals in both the Winter and Summer Olympics. Eagan is one of two competitors to win gold in both Olympic seasons (the other being Gillis Grafström whose only summer gold was in figure skating).

== Personal life ==
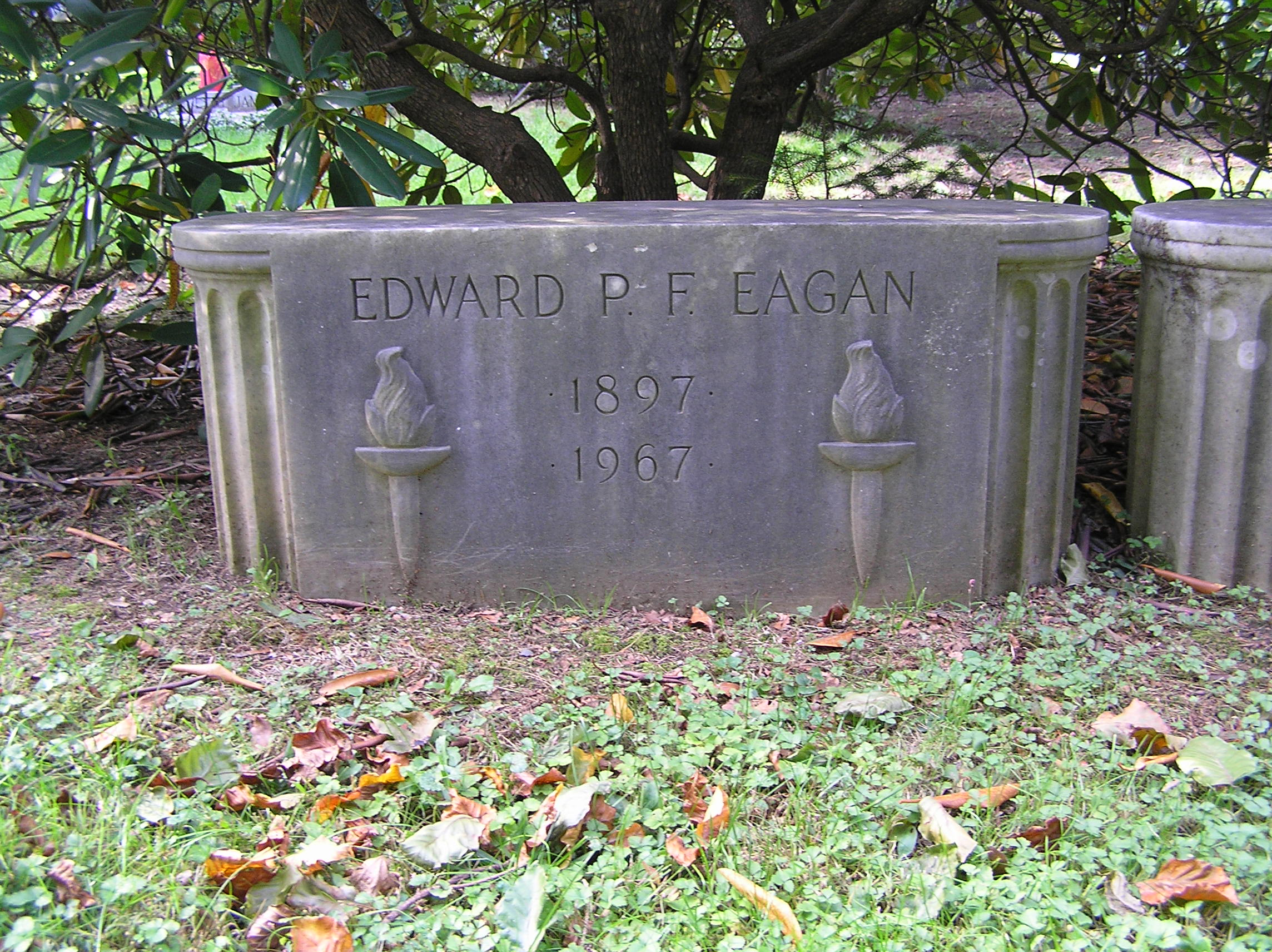
The grave of Eddie Eagan in Greenwood Union Cemetery, Rye, New York

In 1927 Eagan married Margaret Colgate, who was a member of the family that founded Colgate-Palmolive. In 1932 he was admitted to the New York bar and began a career in private practice. He spent five years as an Assistant United States Attorney for the Southern District of New York before joining the United States Army Air Forces. During World War II, he served in the Air Transport Command and visited nearly every place where the Army had planes. He retired with the rank of lieutenant colonel and earned numerous decorations. After the war, Eagan was appointed chairman of the New York State Athletic Commission. He resigned in 1951 to focus on his law practice.

Eddie Eagan set a world record for the fastest circumnavigation of the globe by scheduled airlines on December 13, 1948. He traveled 20,559 miles in 147 hours and 15 minutes stopping at 18 different stations and beat the previous record by 20 hours and 15 minutes.

Eagan appeared as a contestant on the CBS television program, I've Got a Secret on the October 13, 1954 episode.

He died at age 70 in New York City and was interred at Greenwood Union Cemetery.

== See also ==
- Adventurers' Club of New York
- List of male boxers
- List of multi-sport athletes
- List of multi-sport champions
- List of Olympians who won medals in the Summer and Winter Games
