= Paul Stevens (bobsleigh) =

American bobsledder

Olympic medal record

Men's Bobsleigh
Silver medal – second place	1932 Lake Placid	Four-man

Francis Paul Stevens (Alternate listing: F. Paul Stevens, Paul Stevens) (October 16, 1889 – March 17, 1949) was an American bobsledder who competed in the early 1930s. He won the silver medal in the four-man event at the 1932 Winter Olympics in Lake Placid. He was the brother of fellow bobsledders Curtis Stevens and Hubert Stevens.
