= Christian Hansez =

Belgian bobsledder

Christian William Hansez (6 May 1910 – 6 June 1983) was a Belgian bobsledder who competed in the early 1930s. He finished tenth in the two-man event at the 1932 Winter Olympics in Lake Placid, New York.
