= Robert Minton (bobsleigh) =

American bobsledder

Olympic medal record

Bobsleigh
Bronze medal – third place	1932 Lake Placid	Two-man

Robert Henry Minton (July 13, 1904 – September 1974) was an American bobsledder who competed in the 1930s with a huge throw in. He won the bronze medal in the two-man event at the 1932 Winter Olympics in Lake Placid. He died in New York City.
