= Curtis Stevens =

American bobsledder

- Born: Curtis Stevens; 1 June 1898
- Died: 15 May 1979 (aged 80)

Curtis Stevens
Medal record

Bobsleigh

Representing the United States

Olympic Games
Gold medal – first place	1932 Lake Placid	Two-man

Curtis Palmer Stevens (June 1, 1898 – May 15, 1979) was an American bobsledder who competed in the 1930s. He won the gold medal in the two-man event at the 1932 Winter Olympics in Lake Placid.

The national champion for bobsleigh in the two-man event is named in Stevens' honor. He died in Lake Placid, New York. He was the brother of fellow bobsledders Paul Stevens and Hubert Stevens.
