= Austria at the 1932 Winter Olympics =

- IOC code: AUT
- NOC: Austrian Olympic Committee
- Website: www.olympia.at (in German)

in Lake Placid
- Competitors: 7 (6 men, 1 woman) in 5 sports
- Flag bearer: Harald Paumgarten
- Medals Ranked 6th: Gold 1 Silver 1 Bronze 0 Total 2

Winter Olympics appearances (overview)
- 1924; 1928; 1932; 1936; 1948; 1952; 1956; 1960; 1964; 1968; 1972; 1976; 1980; 1984; 1988; 1992; 1994; 1998; 2002; 2006; 2010; 2014; 2018; 2022; 2026

Austria competed at the 1932 Winter Olympics in Lake Placid, United States, February 4 to February 15. The team was composed of 7 athletes, consisting of 6 men and 1 women.

== Medalists ==
Medal	Name	Sport	Event
Gold	Karl Schäfer	Figure skating	Men's singles
Silver	Fritzi Burger	Figure skating	Women's singles

== Bobsleigh ==
Sled	Athletes	Event	Run 1		Run 2		Run 3		Run 4		Total	
Sled	Athletes	Event	Time	Rank	Time	Rank	Time	Rank	Time	Rank	Time	Rank
AUT-1	Hugo Weinstengl; Johann Baptist Gudenus	Two-man	2:23.83	12	2:21.82	12	2:16.19	12	2:14.58	12	9:16.42	12

== Cross-country skiing ==
Men

Event	Athlete	Race	
Event	Athlete	Time	Rank
18 km	Gregor Höll	1'55:18	41
18 km	Harald Paumgarten	1'41:20	29
18 km	Harald Bosio	1'38:23	21

== Figure skating ==
Men

Athlete	Event	CF	FS	Places	Points	Final rank
Karl Schäfer	Men's singles	1	1	9	2602.0	1st place, gold medalist(s)

Women

Athlete	Event	CF	FS	Places	Points	Final rank
Fritzi Burger	Women's singles	2	2	18	2167.1	2nd place, silver medalist(s)

== Nordic combined ==
Events:

- 18 km cross-country skiing
- normal hill ski jumping

The cross-country skiing part of this event was combined with the main medal event of cross-country skiing. Those results can be found above in this article in the cross-country skiing section. Some athletes (but not all) entered in both the cross-country skiing and Nordic combined event, their time on the 18 km was used for both events.

The ski jumping (normal hill) event was held separate from the main medal event of ski jumping, results can be found in the table below.

Athlete	Event	Cross-country			Ski Jumping				Total	
Athlete	Event	Time	Points	Rank	Distance 1	Distance 2	Total points	Rank	Points	Rank
Gregor Höll	Individual	1'55:18	114.00	28	55.0 (fall)	57.0 (fall)	71.0	33	185.00	33
Harald Paumgarten	Individual	1'41:20	172.50	15	38.5	45.0	169.7	25	342.20	18
Harald Bosio	Individual	1'38:23	186.00	10	49.5 (fall)	49.5	112.7	30	298.70	29

== Ski jumping ==
Athlete	Event	Jump 1			Jump 2			Total	
Athlete	Event	Distance	Points	Rank	Distance	Points	Rank	Points	Rank
Harald Bosio	Normal hill	68.0	29.0 (fall)	34	DNF	–	–	DNF	–
Harald Paumgarten	Normal hill	42.5	80.7	28	46.5	82.7	27	163.4	25

== Sources ==
- Lattimer, George, ed. (1932). Official Report III Olympic Winter Games Lake Placid 1932 (PDF). III Olympic Winter Games Committee. Archived (PDF) from the original on 28 May 2008.
- "Olympic Medal Winners". International Olympic Committee. Archived from the original on 13 June 2008.
- Olympic Winter Games 1932, full results by sports-reference.com
