= Henry Homburger =

American bobsledder

Olympic medal record

Bobsleigh
Silver medal – second place	1932 Lake Placid	Four-man

Henry Anton Homburger (December 2, 1902 – September 14, 1950) was an American bobsledder who competed in the early 1930s.

He was born in New York City and died in Sacramento.

At the 1932 Winter Olympics in Lake Placid he won the silver medal in the four-man event.

A civil engineer by profession, Homburger was also responsible for the design of the bobsleigh track used for those Winter Olympics; he also did engineer work for Saranac Lake architect William G. Distin in the design of the Olympic Arena in Lake Placid.
