= List of Olympic venues in bobsleigh =

For the Winter Olympics, there are 19 venues that have or will host bobsleigh. Initially the only sliding sport for the Winter Games, it was first combined with luge in 1976. It has been that way since 1984 and skeleton since 2002.

Games	Venue	Other sports hosted at venue for those games	Capacity	Ref.
1924 Chamonix	La Piste de Bobsleigh des Pellerins	None	Not listed.	
1928 St. Moritz	St. Moritz-Celerina Olympic Bobrun	None	Not listed	
1932 Lake Placid	Mt. Van Hoevenberg Bob-Run	None	12,500	
1936 Garmisch-Partenkirchen	Riessersee	Ice hockey, Speed skating	17,940 (Bobsleigh), 16,000 (Ice hockey, Speed skating)	
1948 St. Mortiz	St. Moritz-Celerina Olympic Bobrun	None	Not listed.	
1952 Oslo	Korketrekkeren	None	Not listed	
1956 Cortina d'Ampezzo	Pista di bob	None	4,650	
1964 Innsbruck	Bob und Rodelbahn Igls	Luge (separate track)	Not listed.	
1968 Grenoble	Piste de Bobsleigh	None	Not listed.	
1972 Sapporo	Mt. Teine Bobsleigh Course	None	Not listed.	
1976 Innsbruck	Kombinierte Kunsteisbahn für Bob-Rodel Igls	Luge	Not listed.	
1980 Lake Placid	Mt. Van Hoevenberg Bob and Luge Run	Luge (Separate track)	11,000 (bobsleigh)	
1984 Sarajevo	Sarajevo Olympic Bobsleigh and Luge Track	Luge	4,000 (luge); 7,500 (bobsleigh)	
1988 Calgary	Canada Olympic Park (includes bobsleigh/luge track)	Freestyle skiing (demonstration), Luge, Nordic combined (ski jumping), Ski jumping	25,000 (bobsleigh/luge); 35,000 (ski jumping); 15,000 (freestyle)	
1992 Albertville	La Plagne	Luge	Not listed.	
1994 Lillehammer	Lillehammer Olympic Bobsleigh and Luge Track	Luge	10,000	
1998 Nagano	Spiral	Luge	10,000	
2002 Salt Lake City	Utah Olympic Park Track	Luge, Skeleton	15,000	
2006 Turin	Cesana Pariol	Luge, Skeleton	4,400	
2010 Vancouver	The Whistler Sliding Centre	Luge, Skeleton	12,000	
2014 Sochi	Sliding Center Sanki	Luge, Skeleton	9,000	
2018 PyeongChang	Olympic Sliding Centre	Luge, Skeleton	7,000 (including 6,000 standing)	
2022 Beijing	Yanqing National Sliding Centre	Luge, Skeleton	10,000 (including 8,500 standing)	
2026 Milan-Cortina	Cortina Sliding Centre "Eugenio Monti"	Luge, Skeleton	Not listed.	
2030 French Alps	La Plagne	Luge, Skeleton	16,000	
2034 Utah	Utah Olympic Park Track	Luge, Skeleton	12,000	

== Gallery of venues ==
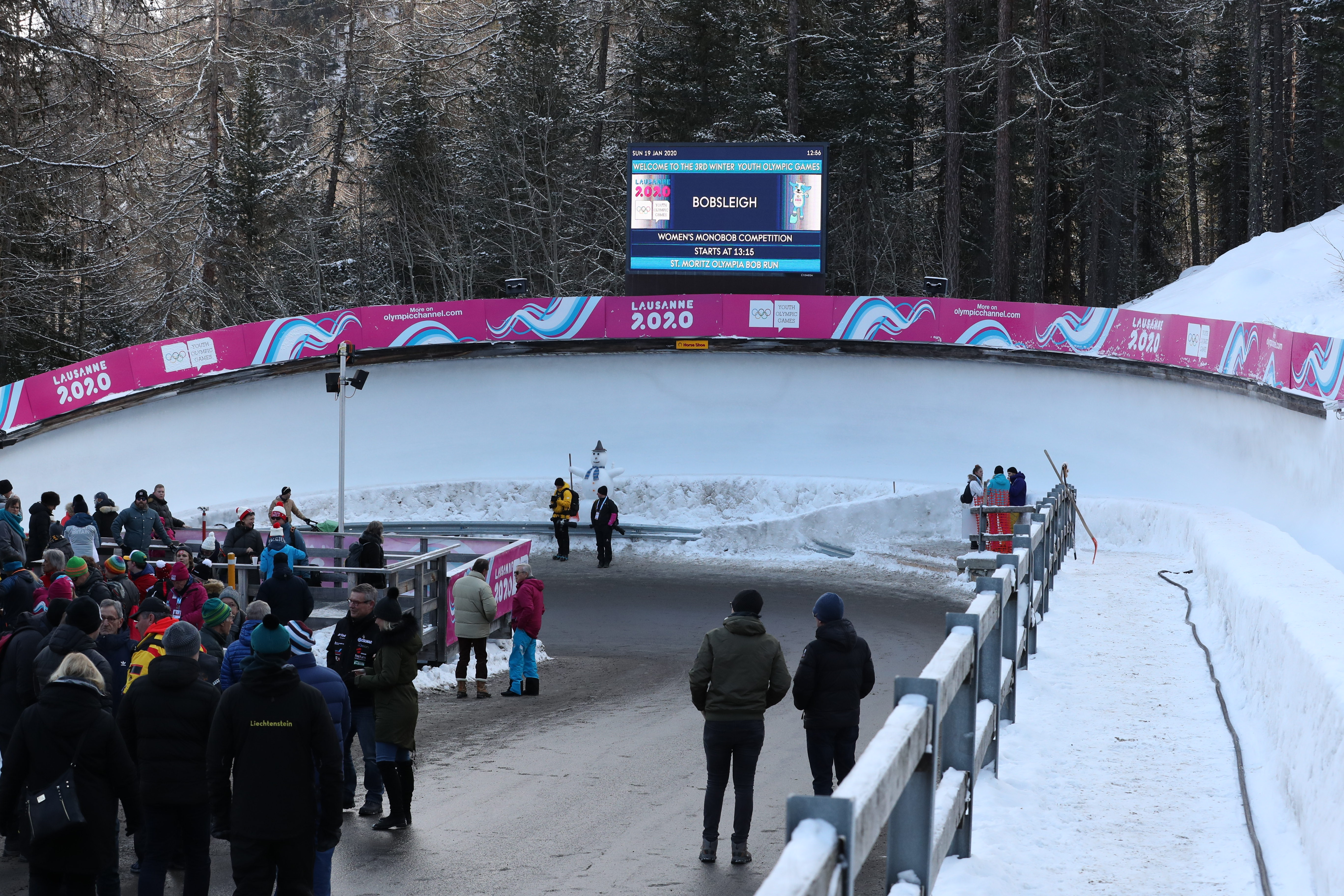
The St. Moritz-Celerina Olympic Bobrun hosted bobsleigh at the 1928 and the 1948 Winter Olympics.

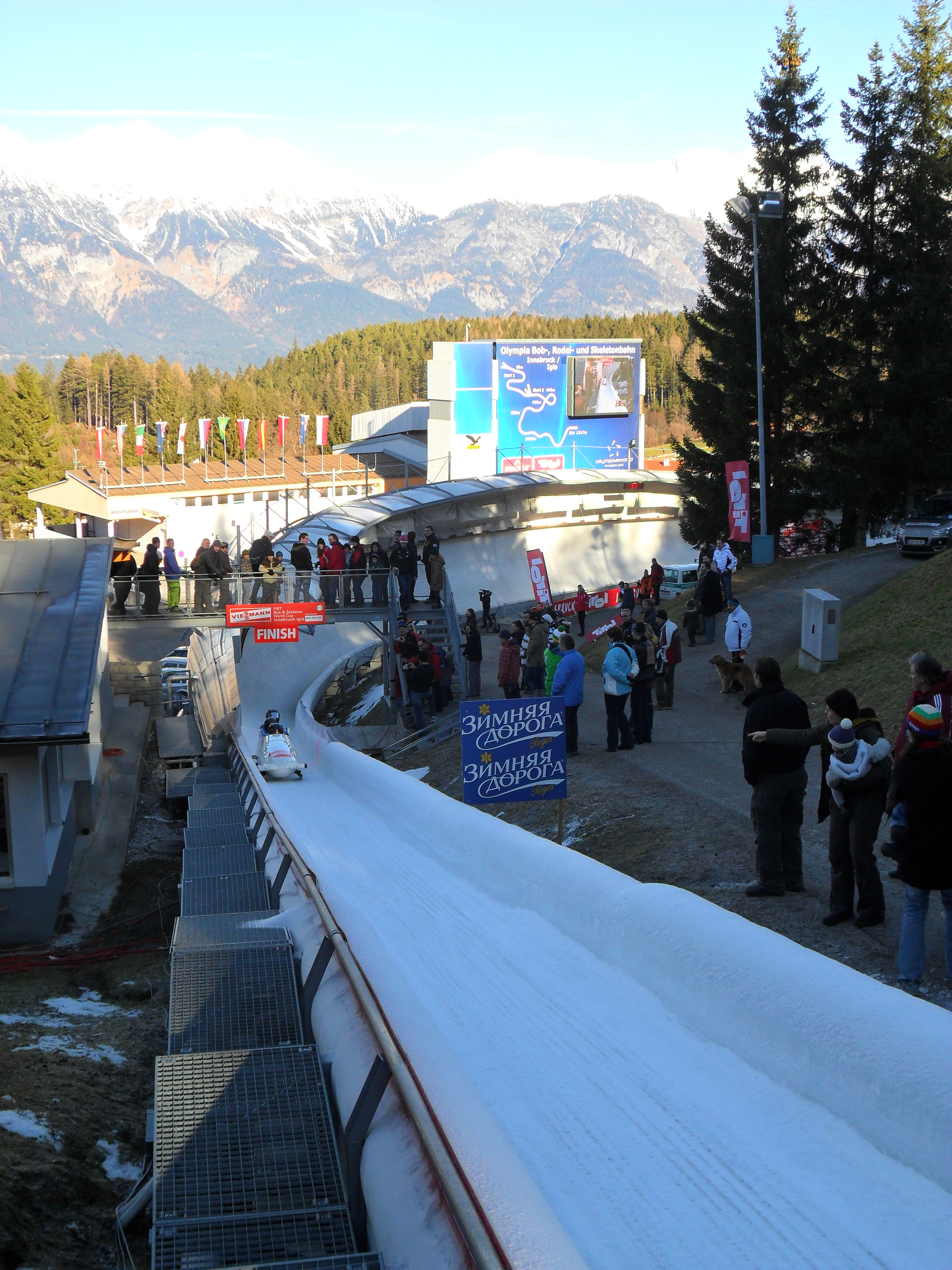
Olympic Sliding Centre Innsbruck hosted bobsleigh at the 1964 and 1976 Winter Olympics.

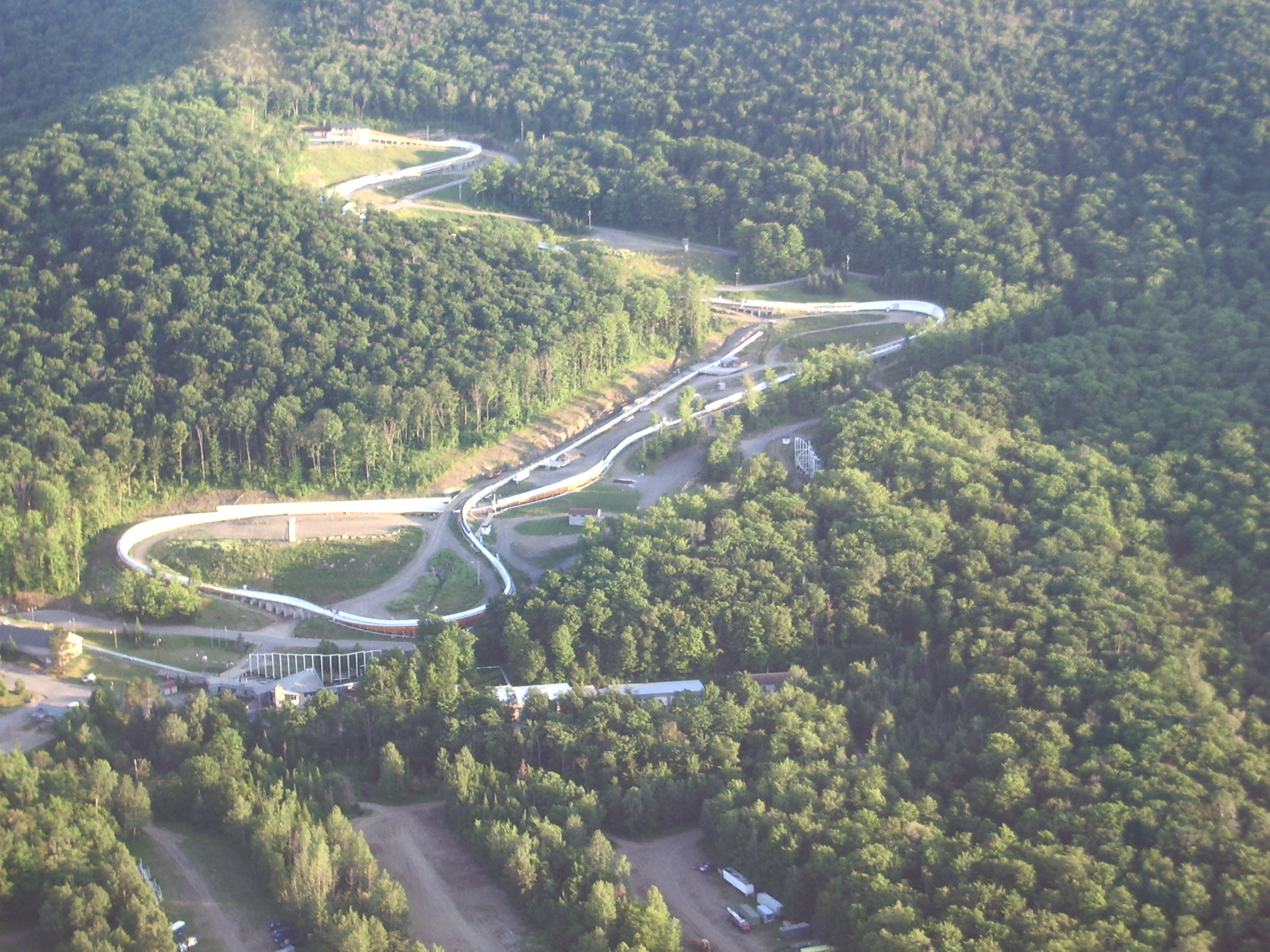
The combination track of the Mt. Van Hoevenberg Olympic Bobsled Run at Lake hosted bobsleigh at the 1932 and 1980 Winter Olympics in Lake Placid.

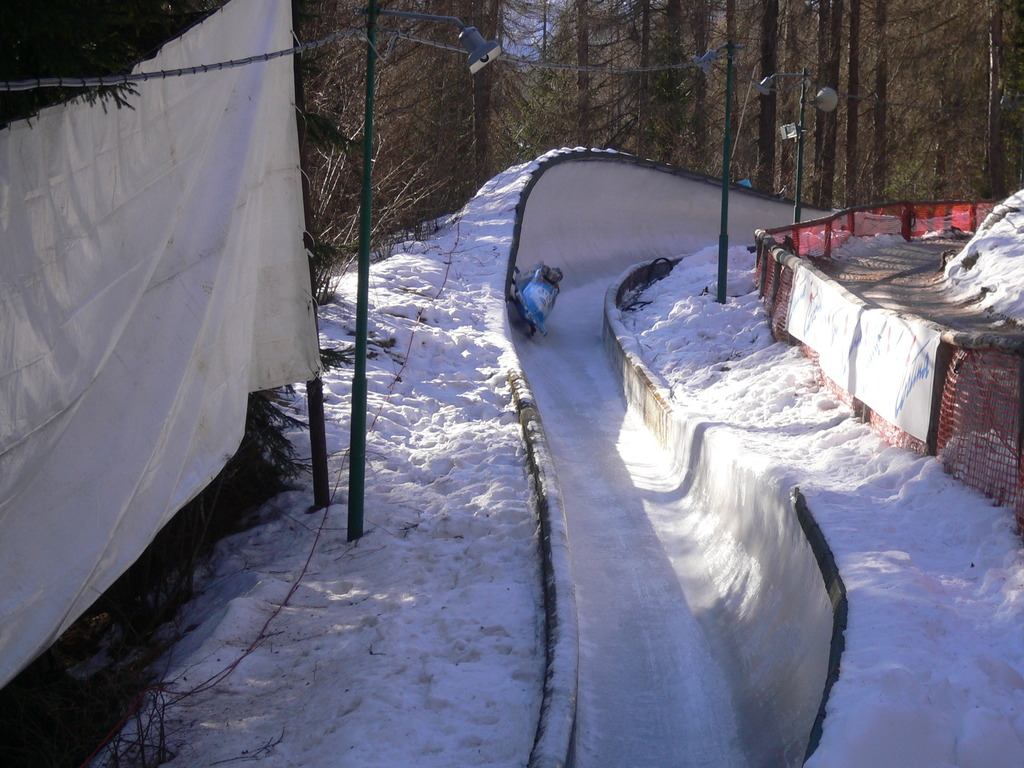
Eugenio Monti Olympic Track hosted bobsleigh at the 1956 Winter Olympics in Cortina d’Ampezzo.

Sarajevo Olympic Bobsleigh and Luge Track hosted bobsleigh at the 1984 Winter Olympics.

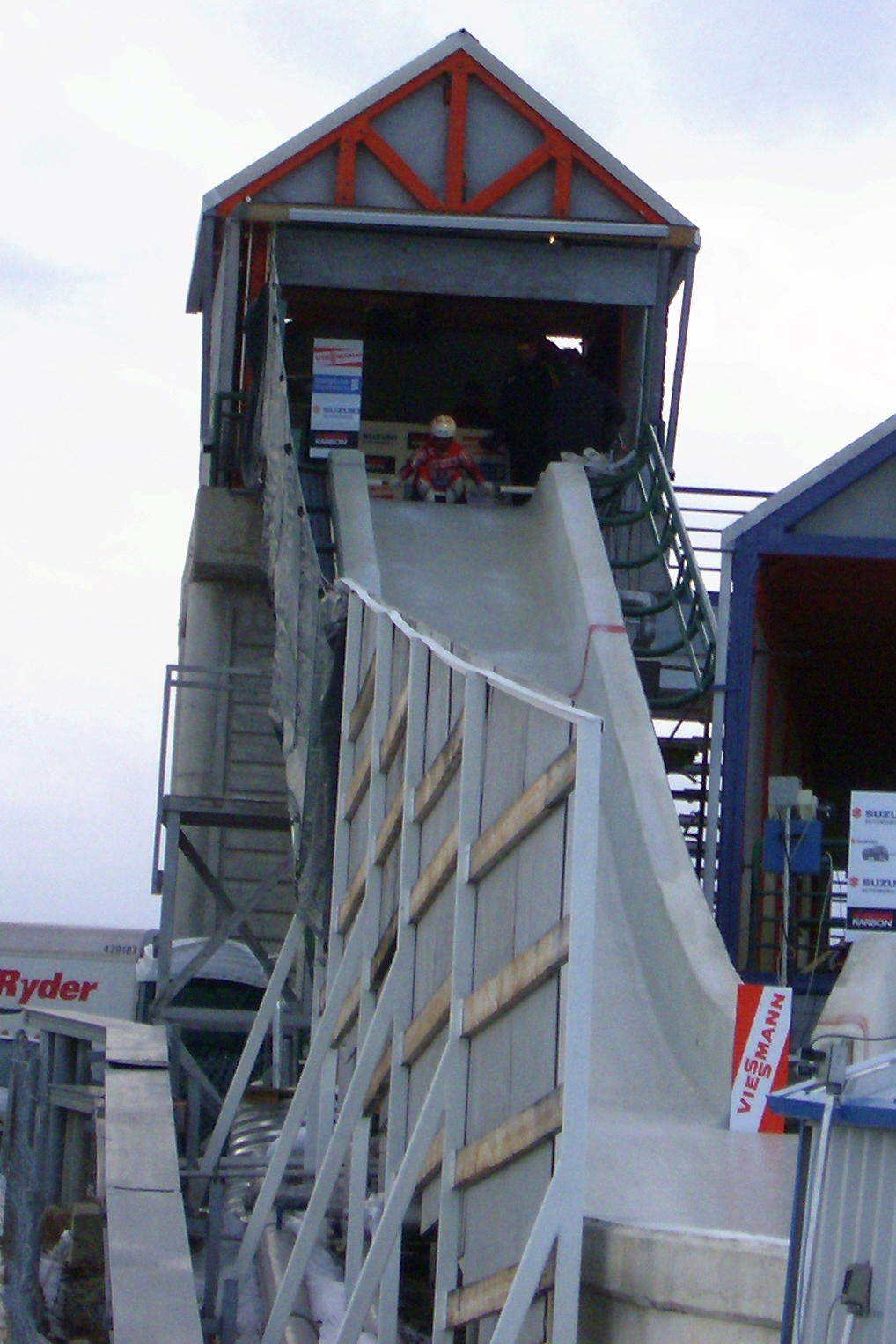
Canada Olympic Park bobsleigh, luge, and skeleton track hosted bobsleigh during the 1988 Winter Olympics in Calgary.

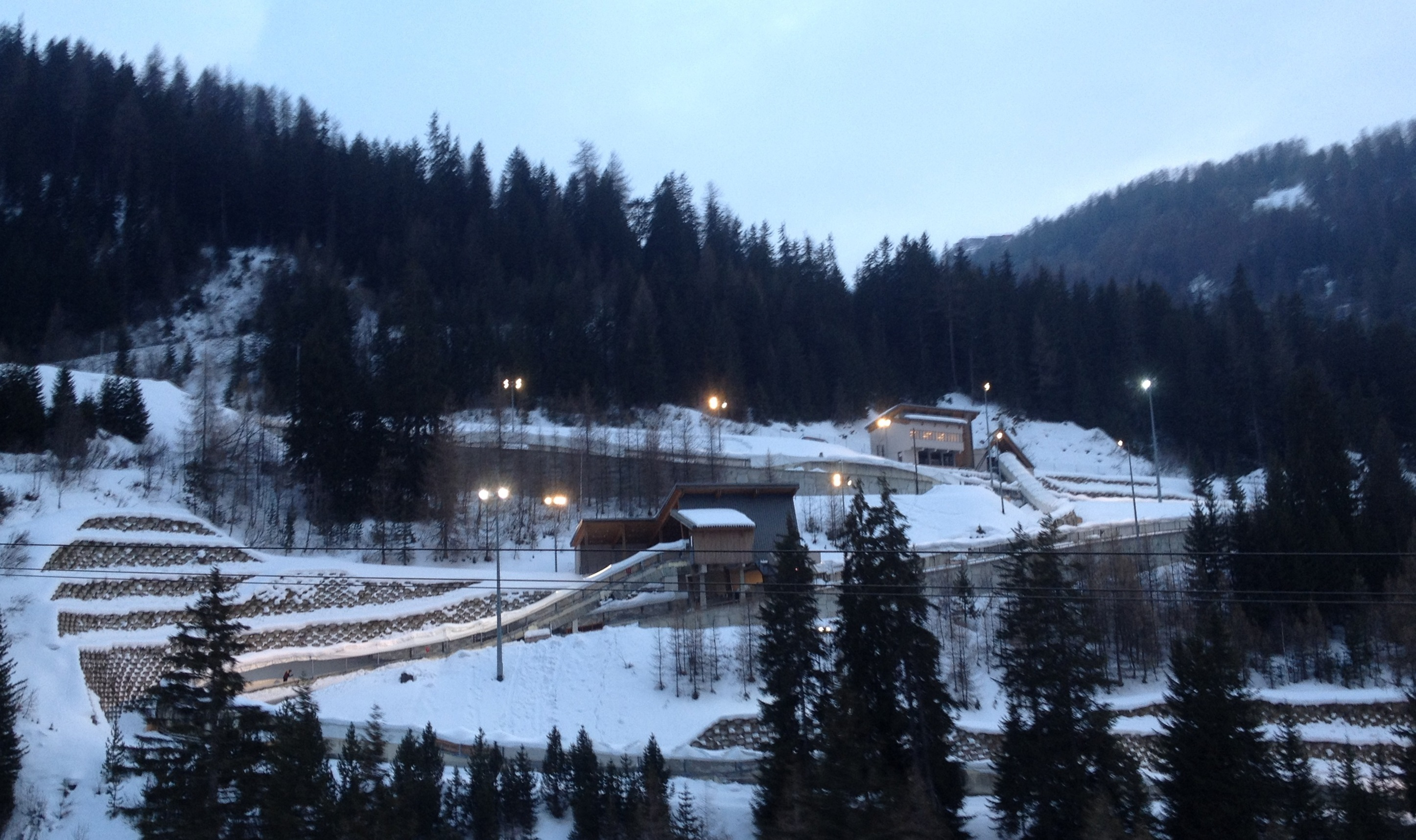
La Plagne bobsleigh, luge, and skeleton track hosted bobsleigh at the 1992 Winter Olympics in Albertville and will do so again at the 2030 Winter Olympics in the French Alps.

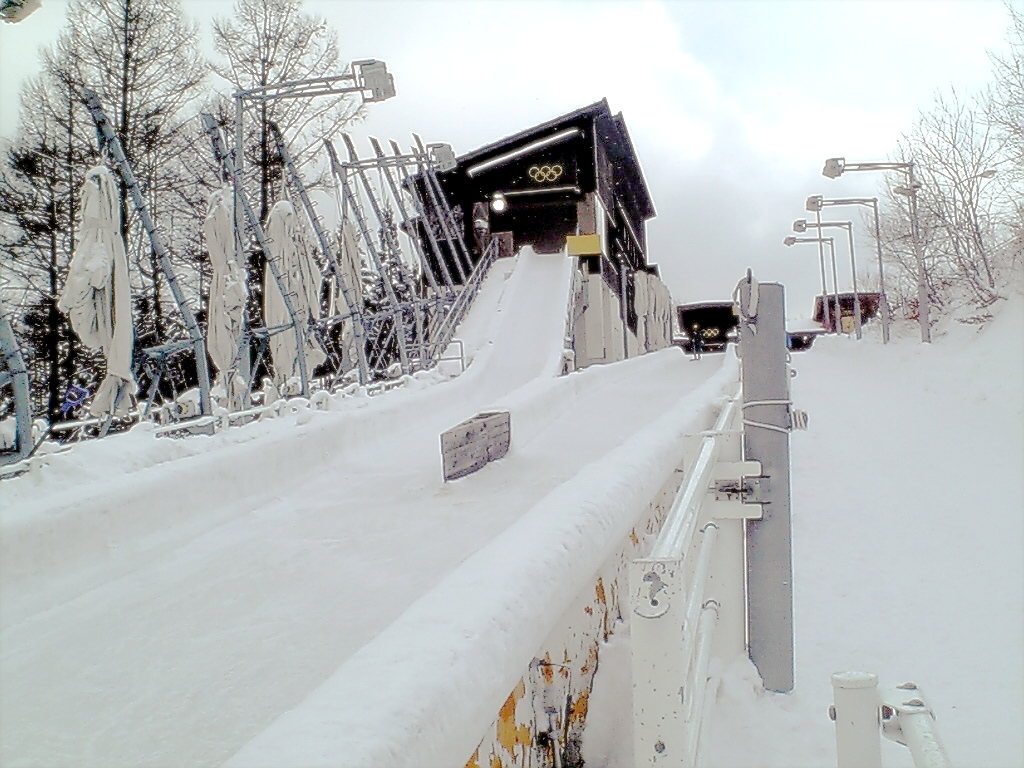
Spiral hosted bobsleigh at the 1998 Winter Olympics in Nagano.

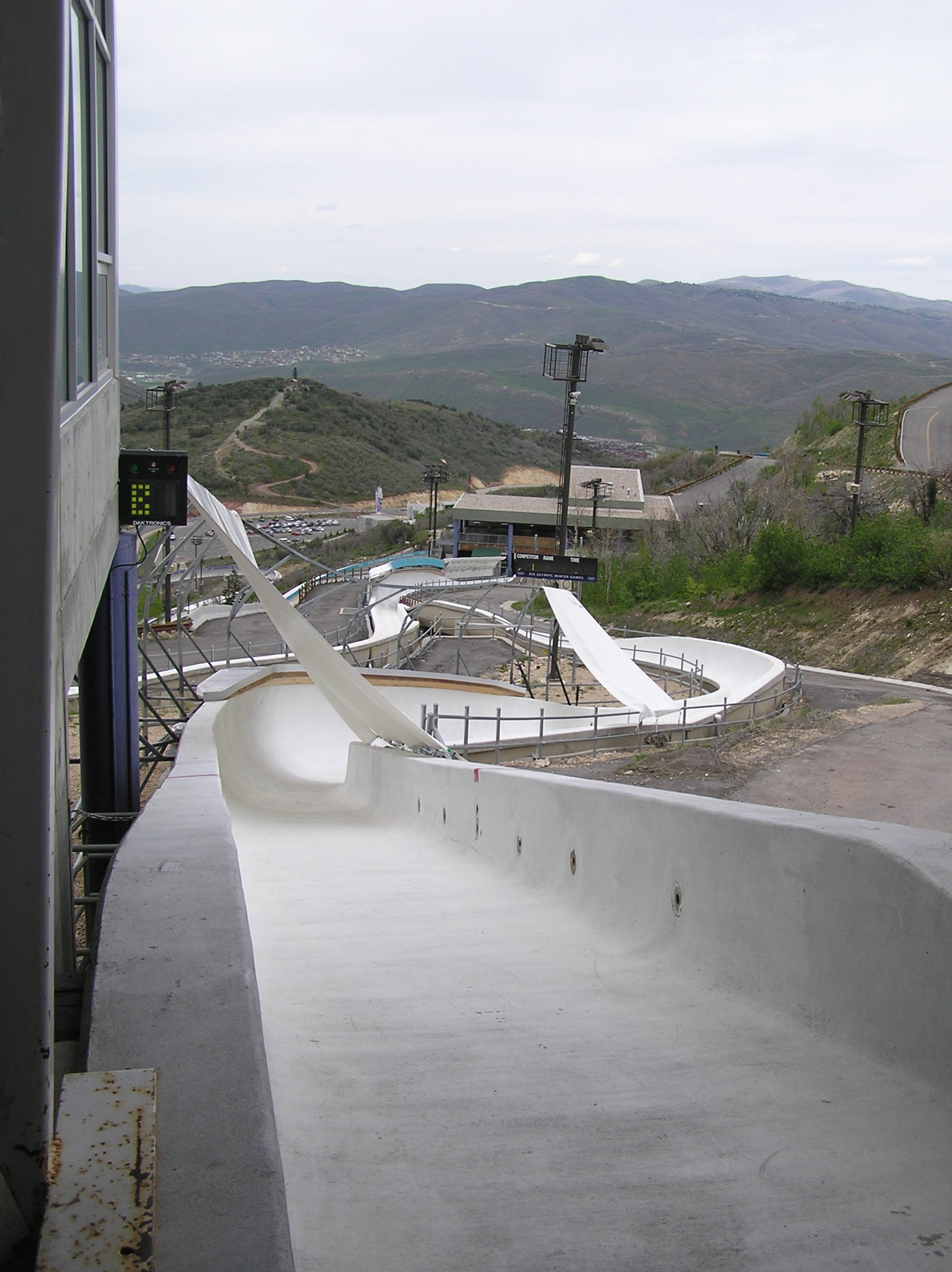
The Utah Olympic Park Track hosted bobsleigh at the 2002 Winter Olympics in Salt Lake City and will do so again in 2034.

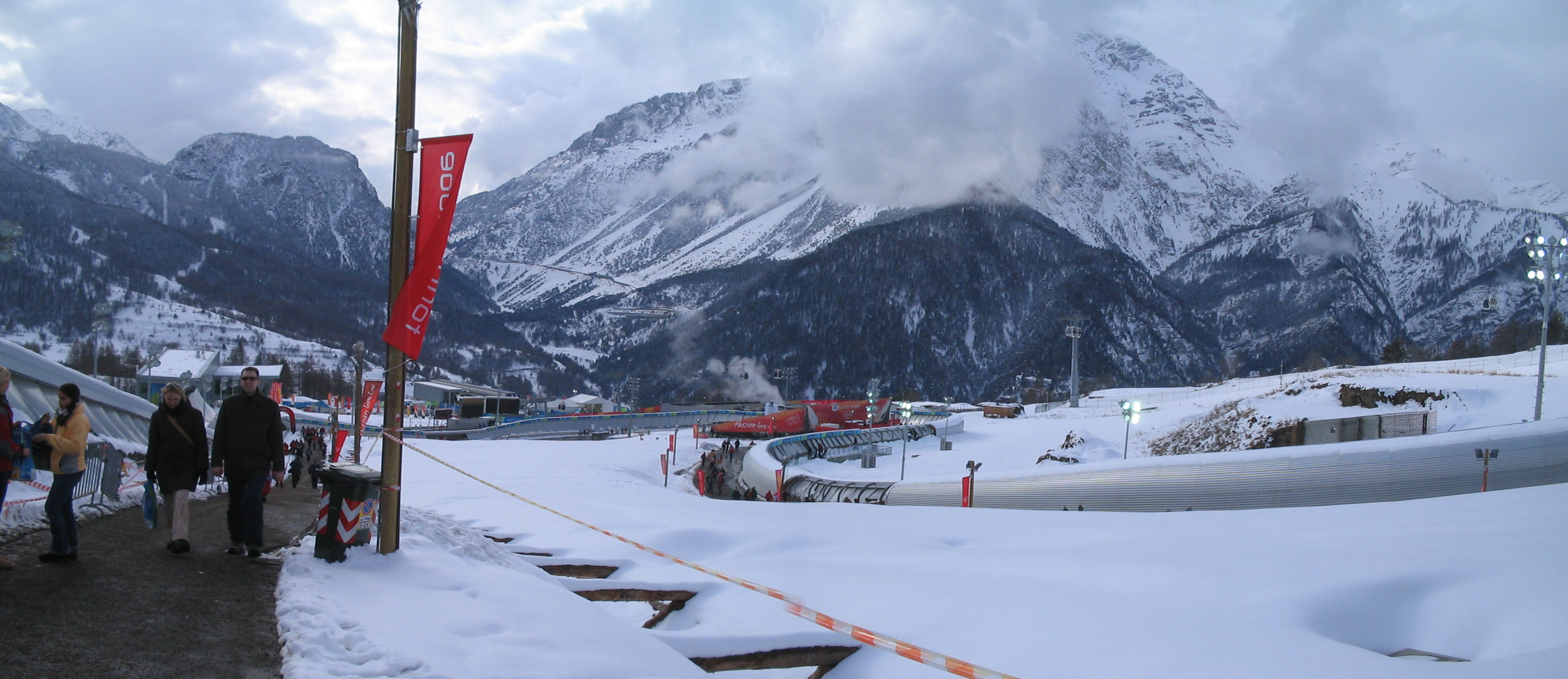
Cesana Pariol hosted bobsleigh at the 2006 Winter Olympics in neighboring Turin.

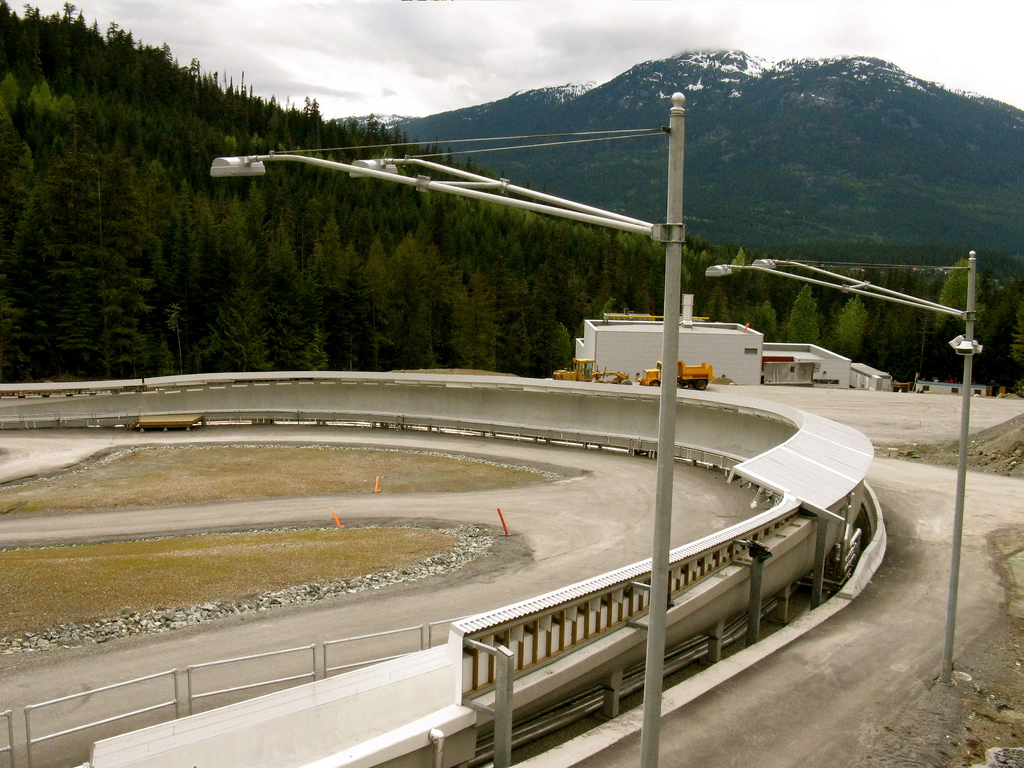
The Whistler Sliding Centre hosted bobsleigh at the 2010 Winter Olympics in Vancouver.

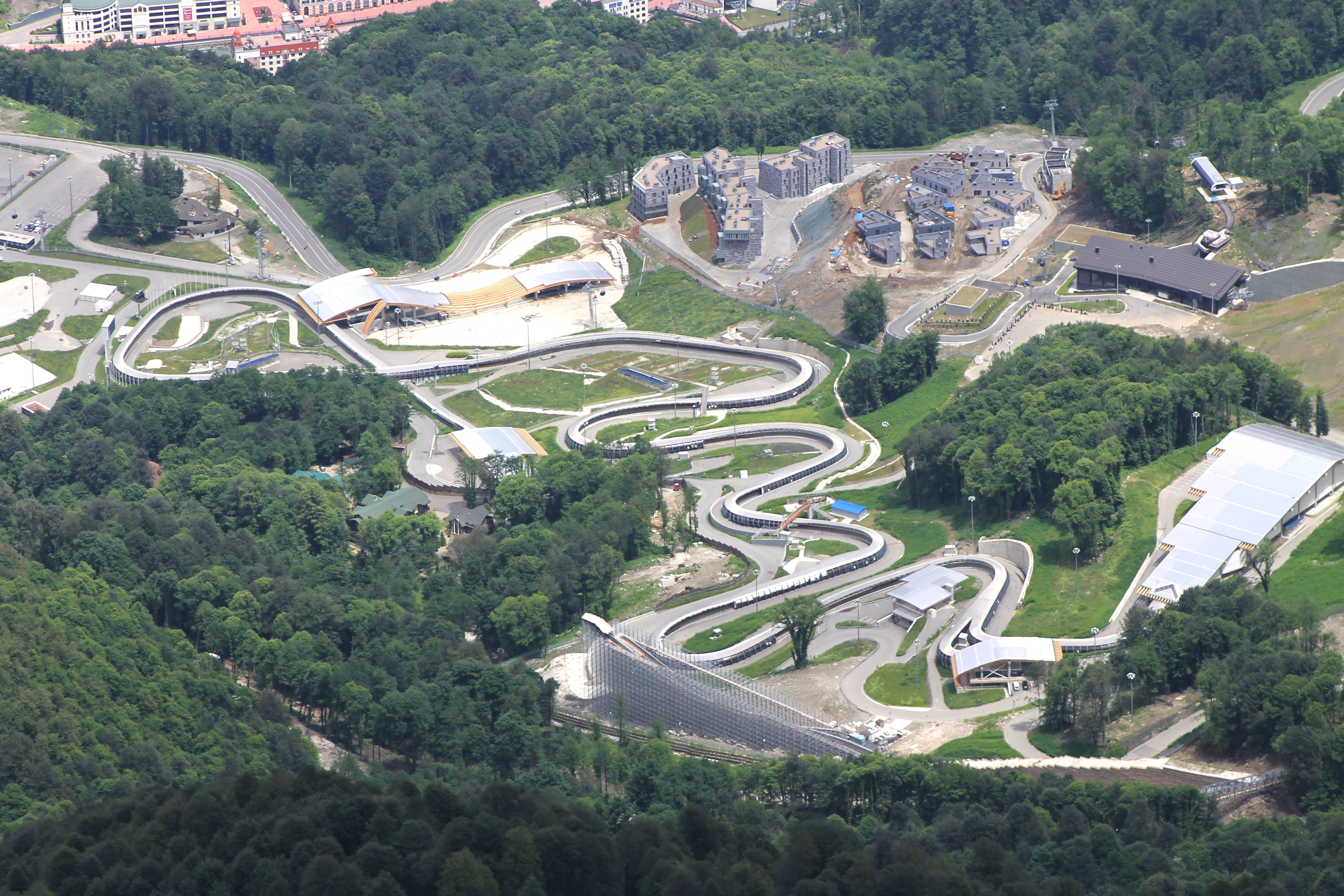
Sliding Center Sanki hosted bobsleigh at the 2014 Winter Olympics in Sochi.

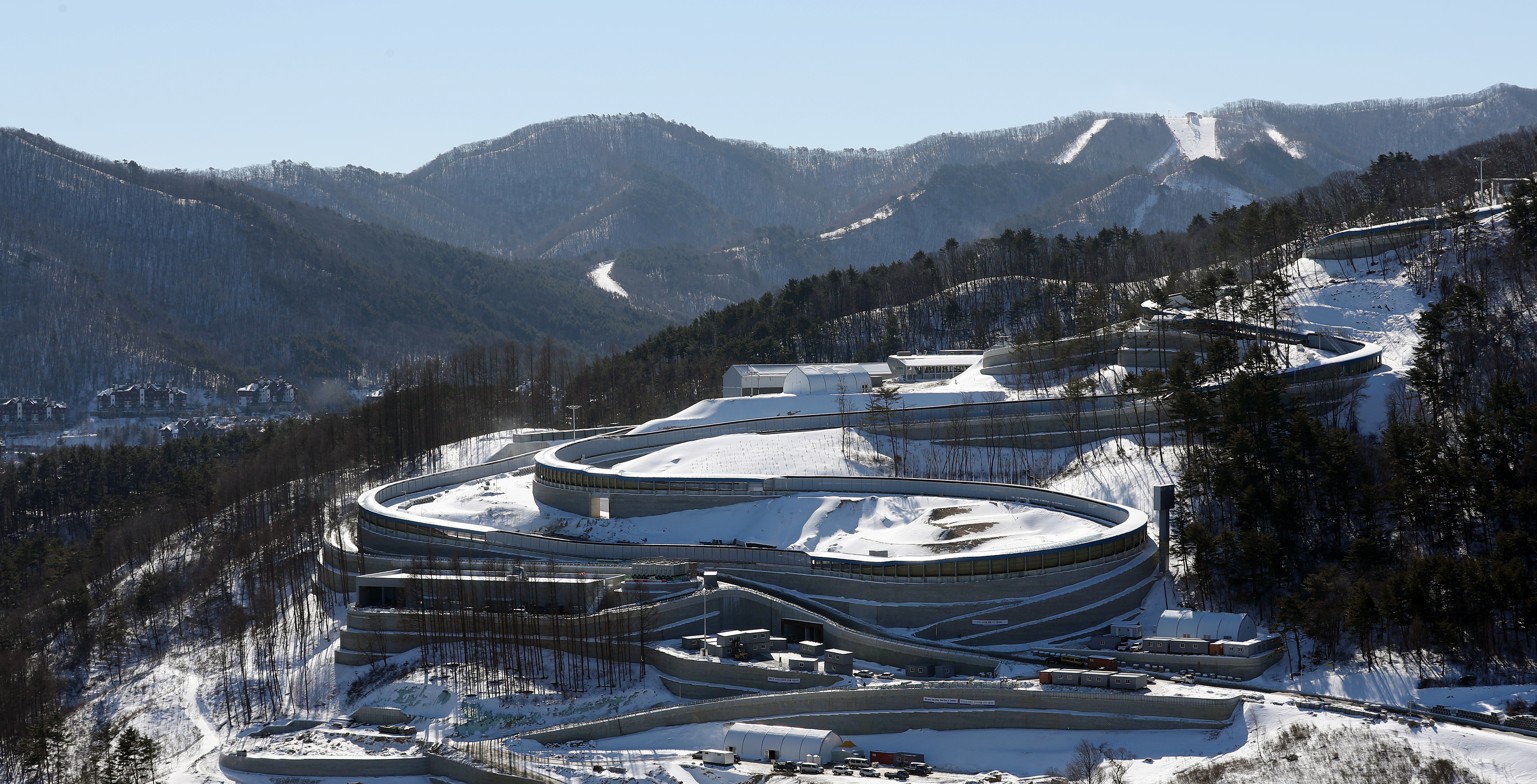
The Olympic Sliding Centre hosted bobsleigh at the 2018 Winter Olympics in Pyeongchang.

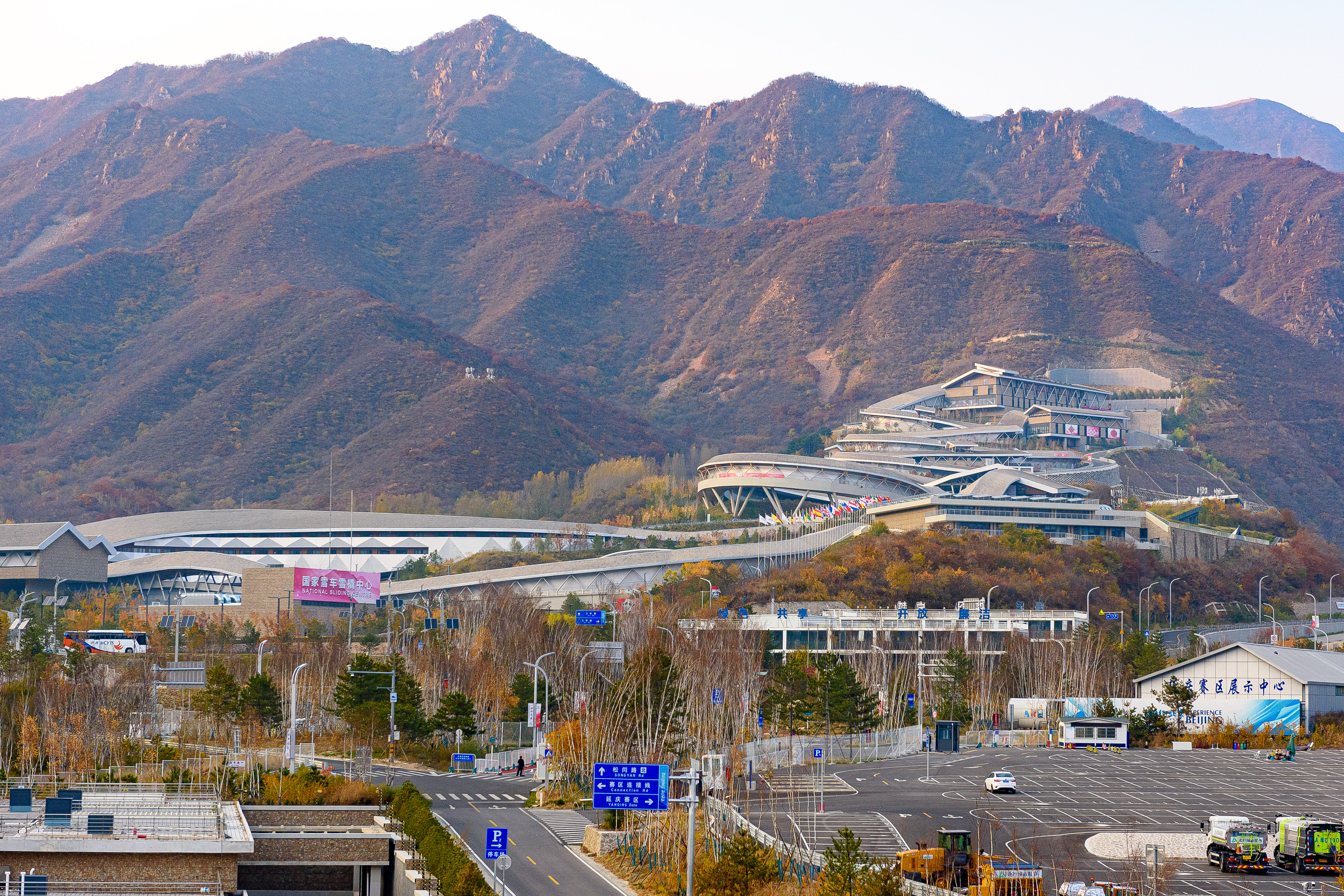
Yanqing National Sliding Centre hosted bobsleigh at the 2022 Winter Olympics in Beijing.

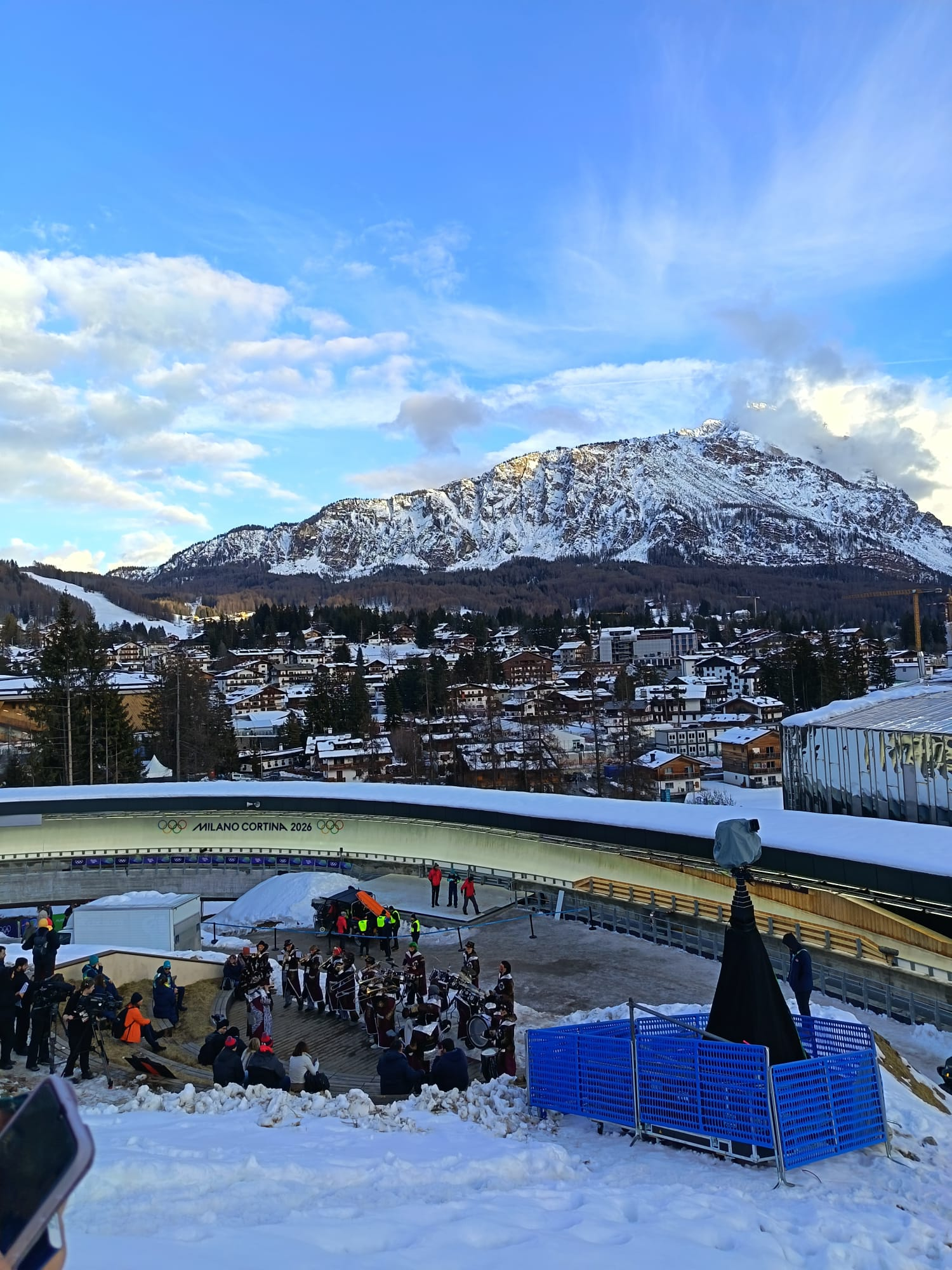
The Cortina Sliding Centre hosted bobsleigh at the 2026 Winter Olympics in Cortina d’Ampezzo.
