= Jacques Maus =

Belgian bobsledder

Jacques Maus (born 28 October 1905, date of death unknown) was a Belgian bobsledder who competed in the early 1930s. He finished tenth in the two-man event at the 1932 Winter Olympics in Lake Placid, New York.
