= Edmund Horton =

American bobsledder

Olympic medal record

Men's Bobsleigh
| Silver medal – second place | 1932 Lake Placid | Four-man |

Edmund Carlton Horton (March 25, 1896 – May 26, 1944) was an American bobsledder who competed in the early 1930s. He won the silver medal in the four-man event at the 1932 Winter Olympics in Lake Placid.
