= Cesare Chiogna =

Swiss ski jumper

Personal information
- Nationality: Swiss
- Born: 1910; Lamaden, Switzerland
- Died: 20 October 1978 (aged 67–68)

Sport
- Sport: Ski jumping

Cesare Chiogna (1910 – 20 October 1978) was a Swiss ski jumper. He competed in the individual event at the 1932 Winter Olympics.
