= Daniel Armand-Delille =

French bobsledder (1906–1958)

Personal information
- Full name: Daniel Dominique Hubert Armand-Delille
- Nationality: French
- Born: 28 July 1906 Maillebois, France
- Died: 8 April 1958 (aged 51) Manhattan, New York, US

Sport
- Sport: Bobsleigh

Daniel Armand-Delille (28 July 1906 – 8 April 1958) was a French bobsledder who competed in the early 1930s. At the 1932 Winter Olympics in Lake Placid, New York, he finished 11th in the two-man event.
