= Hugo Weinstengl =

Austrian bobsledder

Hugo Henry Weinstengel (2 October 1907 – 3 July 1968) was an Austrian bobsledder who competed in the early 1930s. At the 1932 Winter Olympics in Lake Placid, New York, United States, he finished 12th and last in the two-man event.

Weinstengel was born in Vienna on 2 October 1907. He later emigrated with his brother and mother to New York, United States, where he changed his surname to Winston. He died in New York on 3 July 1968 at the age of 60.
