= Hans Eisenhut =

Swiss bobsledder

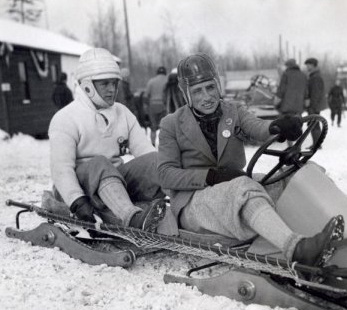
- Hans Eisenhut (left) training with Belgian Max Houben at the 1932 Olympics

Sport
- Sport: Bobsled

Hans Eisenhut was a Swiss bobsledder who competed in the early 1930s. He finished fourth in the four-man event at the 1932 Winter Olympics in Lake Placid, New York.
