= Hans Mehlhorn =

German bobsledder (1900–1983)

Olympic medal record

Men's Bobsleigh
Bronze medal – third place	1932 Lake Placid	Four-man

Hans Mehlhorn (January 16, 1900 - July 2, 1983) was a German bobsledder who competed in the early 1930s. He won the bronze medal in the four-man event at the 1932 Winter Olympics in Lake Placid.
