= Charles Jenny =

Swiss bobsledder

Charles Jenny (born April 1897, date of death unknown) was a Swiss bobsledder who competed in the early 1930s. He finished fourth in the four-man event at the 1932 Winter Olympics in Lake Placid, New York.
