= Percy Bryant =

American bobsledder

Olympic medal record

Bobsleigh
Silver medal – second place	1932 Lake Placid	Four-man

Percy D. Bryant (June 12, 1897 – June 5, 1960) was an American bobsledder who competed in the early 1930s. He won the silver medal in the four-man event at the 1932 Winter Olympics in Lake Placid.
