= Harald Paumgarten =

Austrian skier (1904–1952)

Medal record

Men's cross-country skiing

World Championships
Bronze medal – third place	1933 Innsbruck	4 x 10 km

Harald Paumgarten (4 April 1904 in Graz - 6 February 1952 near Sankt Anton am Arlberg) was an Austrian cross-country skier, ski jumper, and Nordic combined skier who competed in the 1920s and in the 1930s.

He competed in the 1928 Winter Olympics and in the 1932 Winter Olympics where he was also the flag bearer for Austria in the opening ceremony.

In 1928 he finished 17th in the 18 km cross-country skiing event as well as 17th in the Nordic combined competition.

Four years later he finished 29th in the shorter cross-country skiing event. In the ski jumping competition he finished 25th and in the Nordic combined event he finished 18th.

He won a bronze medal in the 4 x 10 km at the 1933 FIS Nordic World Ski Championships in Innsbruck.

== Personal life ==
Paumgarten's older brother Fridtjof (1903-1986) won several skiing competitions and was on the 1928 Austrian Olympic team, but did not compete due to a training injury. Paumgarten's younger sister Gerda Paumgarten (1907-2000) was also a successful skier, winning 4 Alpine World Championship medals.

After retiring from competitive skiing, Paumgarten became a banker in New York City, but then returned to skiing as an instructor at the first alpine skiing school in the United States, Peckett's in Sugar Hill, New Hampshire. Paumgarten married Elise Biddle Robinson, a descendant of banker Nicholas Biddle, in 1936; they had five children, daughters Meta, Elise and Gerda and sons, Harald and Nicholas. Paumgarten died in an avalanche in the skiing resort of St. Anton in 1952. His daughter Meta Paumgarten Burden died in an avalanche in Aspen, Colorado twenty years later, in 1972.
