= Hubert Stevens =

American bobsledder

Personal information
- Full name: John Hubert Stevens
- Born: 7 March 1890 Lake Placid, New York, US
- Died: 26 November 1950 (aged 60) Lake Placid, New York, US

Sport
- Sport: Bobsleigh
Medal record
Bobsleigh
Representing United States
Olympic Games
Gold medal – first place	1932 Lake Placid	Two-man

John Hubert Stevens (March 7, 1890 – November 26, 1950) was an American bobsledder who competed in the 1930s. Competing in two Winter Olympics, he won the gold medal in the two-man event at Lake Placid in 1932.

Lake Stevens in the Adirondack Mountains in New York is named in his honor. He was the brother of fellow bobsledders Curtis Stevens and Paul Stevens.
