= Werner Huth =

German bobsledder (1905–?)

Werner Huth (1905 – ?) is a German bobsledder who competed in the early 1930s. He finished seventh in the two-man event at the 1932 Winter Olympics in Lake Placid, New York.
