= Max Ludwig =

German bobsledder

Olympic medal record

Bobsleigh
Bronze medal – third place	1932 Lake Placid	Four-man

Max Ludwig (22 April 1896 – 26 September 1957) was a German bobsledder who competed in the early 1930s. He won the bronze medal in the four-man event at the 1932 Winter Olympics in Lake Placid and finished seventh in the two-man event at those same games. He was also a painter, and his work was part of the painting event in the art competition at the 1936 Summer Olympics.
