= Gerhard von Hessert =

German bobsledder (1906–1994)

Personal information
- Full name: Gerhard Rudolf Viktor von Hessert
- Nationality: German
- Born: August 18, 1906 Freiburg im Breisgau, Grand Duchy of Baden, German Empire
- Died: September 22, 1994 (aged 88)
- Education: Darmstadt University
- Spouse: Cornelia Fitch Baekeland (after 1939)

Sport
- Country: Germany
- Sport: Bobsled
- Personal best: 8:35:45 (1932)

Baron Gerhard Rudolf Viktor von Hessert (August 18, 1906 – September 22, 1994) was a German bobsledder who competed in the early 1930s.

== Early life ==
Von Hessert was born in Freiburg im Breisgau, the youngest of four siblings, to Friedrich von Hessert and Viktoria von Herff. Most of his childhood was spent in constant movement due to the nature of his father's mining business.

Both sides of the family had political ties in Hesse. His paternal uncle was first district attorney in Darmstadt and his maternal grandfather was a member of the privy council. His paternal great-grandfather Dr. Franz Ferdinand von Hessert was royal physician to Ludwig I and a vaccination pioneer. He conducted in the early 1800s the first cowpox inoculation trials in Hesse after Edward Jenner's vaccination advancements in England.

He attended Darmstadt University and moved to New York City in 1929 after making the journey aboard the RMS Franconia.

== 1932 Winter Olympics ==
Gerhard von Hessert and his team finished seventh and last in the four-man event at the 1932 Winter Olympics in Lake Placid, New York. Germany was conferred overall the bronze medal, same as in the 1928 Games. The event was won by the United States.

== Personal life ==
He married Cornelia Fitch Baekeland, granddaughter of Leo Baekeland, the inventor of Bakelite, in 1939. His wife had a minor role as an actress in the 1944 Rita Hayworth classic Cover Girl.

Baron von Hessert died in 1994.
