= Hasso von Bismarck =

German bobsledder

Hasso von Bismarck (July 22, 1902, Lüneburg, Province of Hanover, German Empire – June 22, 1941, Tauragė, Lithuanian SSR, Soviet Union) was a German bobsledder who competed in the early 1930s. He finished seventh and last in the four-man event at the 1932 Winter Olympics in Lake Placid, New York. He was killed in action during World War II, on the very first day of Operation Barbarossa.
