= Jay O'Brien (bobsleigh) =

American bobsledder (1883–1940)

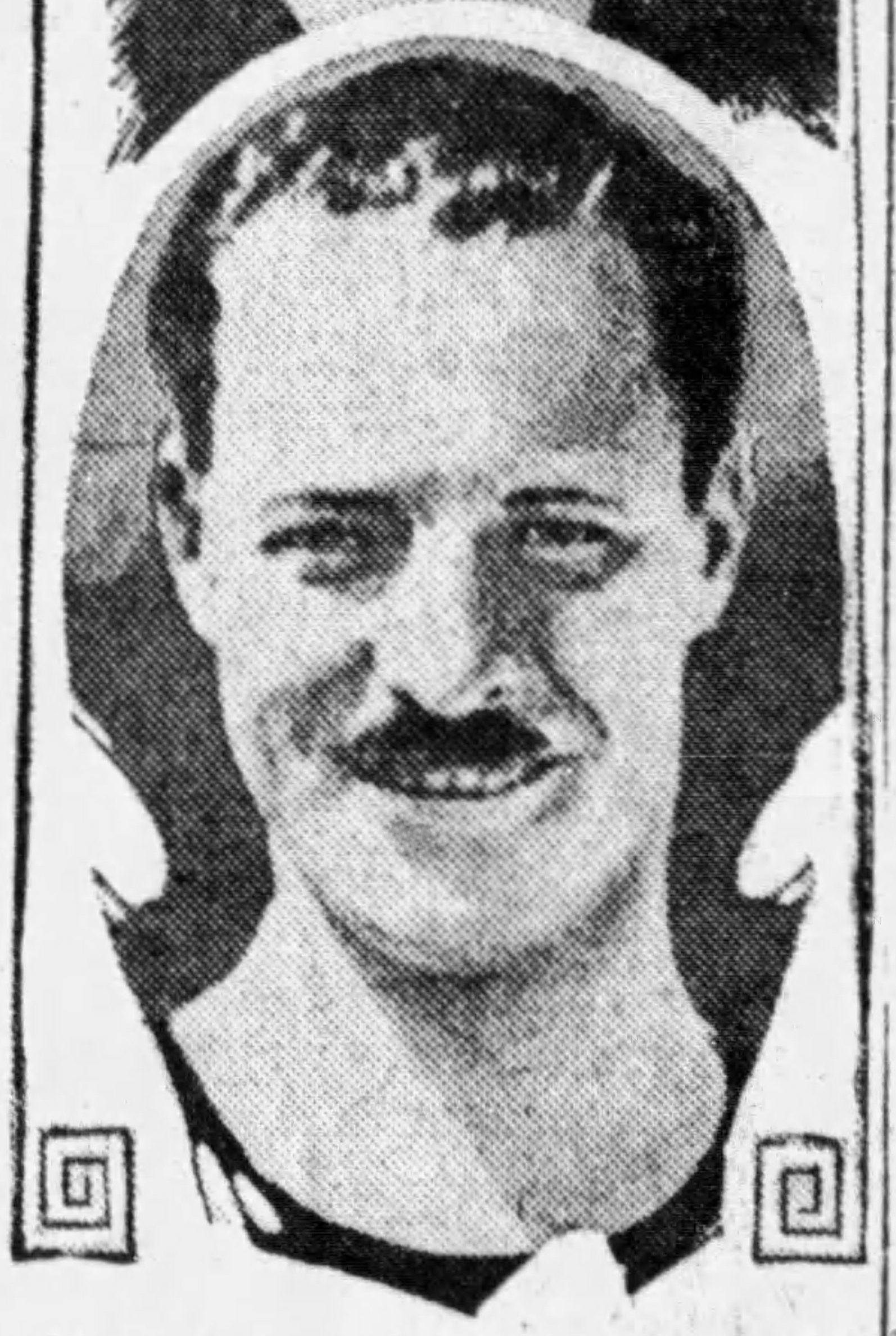
- O'Brien in 1924

Personal information
- Born: 1883
- Died: 1940 (aged 56–57)
Medal record
Men's bobsleigh
Representing the United States
Olympic Games
Gold medal – first place	1932 Lake Placid	Four-man
Silver medal – second place	1928 St. Moritz	Five-man

Jay James O'Brien (February 22, 1883 – April 5, 1940) was an American bobsledder who competed in the late 1920s and early 1930s. He won two medals at the Winter Olympics with a gold in the four-man event at Lake Placid, New York, in 1932 and a silver in the five-man event at St. Moritz in 1928. At 48 years old, he was the oldest Olympic champion.

O'Brien was also a jockey, and was head of the United States Olympic Bobsled Committee at the time of the 1932 Winter Olympics in Lake Placid. He died of a heart attack in 1940.
