= Oscar Geier =

Swiss bobsledder (1882–1942)

Personal information
- Born: 19 August 1882 Zurich, Switzerland
- Died: 5 November 1942 (aged 60) Mountain Lakes, New Jersey, U.S.
Medal record
Bobsleigh
Representing Switzerland
Olympic Games
Silver medal – second place	1932 Lake Placid	Two-man

Oscar Arnold Geier (19 August 1882 – 5 November 1942) was a Swiss bobsledder who competed in the 1930s. He won the silver medal in the two-man event at the 1932 Winter Olympics in Lake Placid.

He was born in Zurich, Switzerland and died in Mountain Lakes, New Jersey.
