= Clifford Gray (athlete) =

American bobsledder (1892–1968)

Medal record

Men's bobsleigh

Representing the United States

Olympic Games
Gold medal – first place	1928 St. Moritz	Five-man
Gold medal – first place	1932 Lake Placid	Four-man

World Championships
Bronze medal – third place	1937 St. Moritz	Four-man

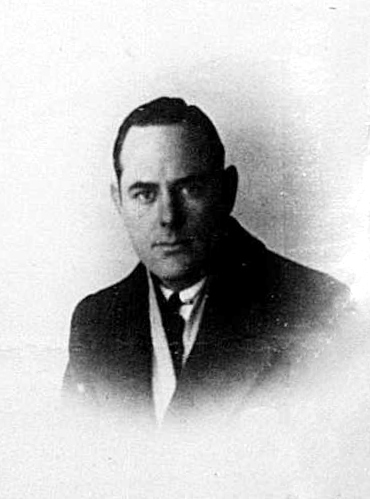
Portrait of Clifford Gray

Clifford Barton "Tippi" Gray (January 29, 1892 – April 1968) was an American bobsledder, songwriter and actor, who competed in the late 1920s and 1930s. He won two medals at the Winter Olympics, a gold in the four-man event at Lake Placid, New York, in 1932 and a gold in the five-man event at St. Moritz, Switzerland, in 1928, as well as a bronze in the four-man event at the 1937 FIBT World Championships in St. Moritz.

Gray was born in Chicago, Illinois, to an English father and American mother. He was a nephew of General Henry T. Allen. He was educated at Lake Forest Academy and then Cornell University. In his early years he was a musical theatre and film actor, appearing with Lew Fields and stock companies in Chicago, and in silent films by Pathé, Famous Players and World. These films included The Crucible (1914), The Weakness of Strength (1916), Madame Cubist (1916), The Best Man (1917), Carnival (1921) and The Man from Home (1922). For many years, it was believed that Gray was the same person as Clifford Grey, an English songwriter and librettist, and Gray's film acting was sometimes wrongly attributed to Grey.

He lived Ohio, then New York, and visited St. Moritz, where he was recruited to the US bobsled team. He later moved to Paris and wrote jazz tunes for the revue at the Moulin Rouge.

Gray was known as a playboy and world-traveling socialite, chronicled often by columnist O. O. McIntyre, who called him "the most consistent of international gadabouts–as homeless as smoke and always adrift." Screenwriter Tom J. Geraghty called him "mysterious as the wind... absolutely omnipresent and ubiquitous." Charlie Chaplin described him in his autobiography: "He would appear at Hollywood parties, a negative, easygoing type with a perpetual vacuous grin". In 1929 Gray married Clara Louise Cassidy, daughter of millionaire United Cigar Stores founder Charles A. Whelan. They were divorced by 1937, McIntyre calling him a "plump bachelor". In 1939, his then fiancé Ruby Pennington was hospitalized with a fractured skull while traveling to New York to marry him.

He died in 1968 near San Diego, California.

== Filmography ==
Grey acted in silent films from 1914 to 1922.

- 1914 – The Crucible – Harry
- 1916 – The Weakness of Strength – Richard Grant
- 1916 – Madame Cubist
- 1916 – A Wall Street Tragedy – Roy Simms
- 1916 – The Heart of a Hero – Tom Adams
- 1916 – A Coney Island Princess – Tony Graves
- 1917 – Alien Blood
- 1917 – The Best Man
- 1919 – The Game's Up – Ted Latham
- 1920 – The Cost – William Fanshaw Jr
- 1921 – Carnival – Lelio, Simonetta's brother
- 1921 – Dangerous Lies – Franklin Bond
- 1922 – The Man from Home – Secretary to the king

== Notes ==
- Bull, Andy (2015). Speed Kings: The 1932 Winter Olympics and the Fastest Men in the World. New York: Avery. ISBN 9781592409099.
- Wallenchinsky, David. (1984). "Bobsled: Four-Man". In The Complete Book of the Olympics: 1896-1980. New York: Penguin Books. p. 560.
