= Bobsleigh at the Winter Olympics =

- IOC Code: BOB
- Governing body: IBSF
- Events: 4 (men: 2; women: 2)

Winter Olympics
- 1924; 1928; 1932; 1936; 1948; 1952; 1956; 1960; 1964; 1968; 1972; 1976; 1980; 1984; 1988; 1992; 1994; 1998; 2002; 2006; 2010; 2014; 2018; 2022; 2026
- Medalists

Bobsleigh is an event in the Winter Olympic Games where a two- or four-person team drives a specially designed sled down an ice track, with the winning team completing the route with the fastest time. The event has been featured since the first Winter Games in 1924 in Chamonix, France, with the exception of the 1960 games in Olympic Valley when the organizing committee decided not to build a track in order to reduce expenses. Other than that exception, the four-man competition has been competed at every game (in 1928, it was a five-man competition). The two-man event was introduced at the 1932 Lake Placid games and a two-woman event was first contested at the 2002 Salt Lake City Olympics.

== Summary ==
Games	Year	Events	Best Nation
1	1924	1	Switzerland (1)
2	1928	1	United States (1)
3	1932	2	United States (2)
4	1936	2	Switzerland (2)
5	1948	2	Switzerland (3)
6	1952	2	Germany (1)
7	1956	2	Italy (1)
8			
9	1964	2	Canada (1); Great Britain (1)
10	1968	2	Italy (2)
11	1972	2	West Germany (1)
12	1976	2	East Germany (1)
13	1980	2	East Germany (2)

Games	Year	Events	Best Nation
14	1984	2	East Germany (3)
15	1988	2	Soviet Union (1)
16	1992	2	Switzerland (4)
17	1994	2	Switzerland (5)
18	1998	2	Germany (2)
19	2002	3	Germany (3)
20	2006	3	Germany (4)
21	2010	3	Germany (5)
22	2014	3	Latvia (1)
23	2018	3	Germany (6)
24	2022	4	Germany (7)
25	2026	4	Germany (8)

== Events ==
Event	24	28	32	36	48	52	56	60	64	68	72	76	80	84	88	92	94	98	02	06	10	14	18	22	26	Years
Four-man	•	•	•	•	•	•	•		•	•	•	•	•	•	•	•	•	•	•	•	•	•	•	•	•	24
Two-man			•	•	•	•	•		•	•	•	•	•	•	•	•	•	•	•	•	•	•	•	•	•	22
Two-woman																			•	•	•	•	•	•	•	7
Women's monobob																								•	•	2
Total events	1	1	2	2	2	2	2		2	2	2	2	2	2	2	2	2	2	3	3	3	3	3	4	4	

== Medal leaders ==
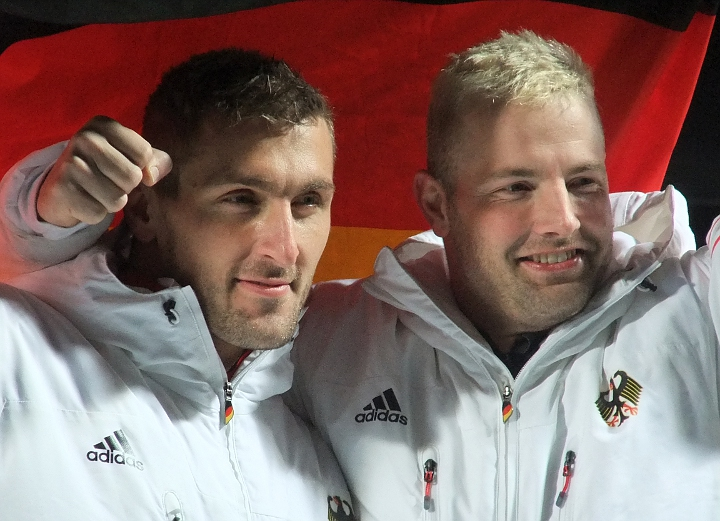
Kevin Kuske (left) and André Lange (pilot) are the most successful Olympic bobsledders, both have five medals, of which four are gold medals attained in three consecutive Olympics.

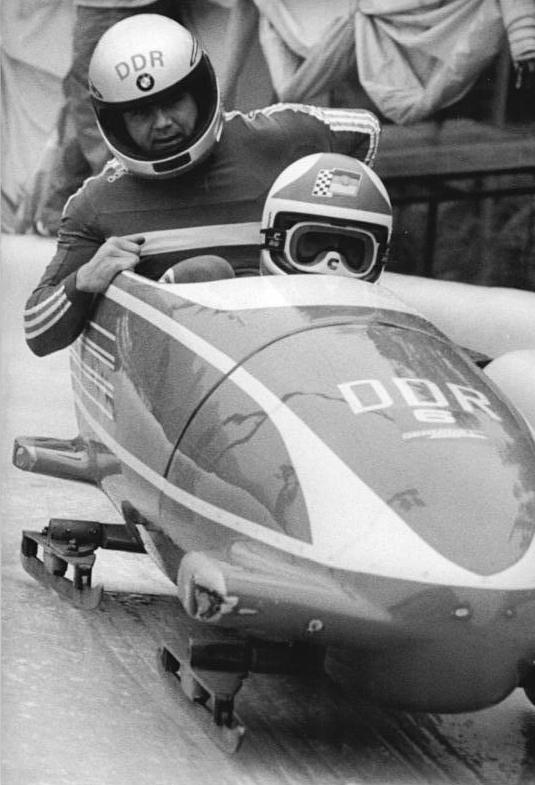
Bogdan Musiol (brakeman) won seven Olympic medals (one gold, five silvers and one bronze in four consecutive Olympics).

Athletes who have won multiple medals (including at least one gold) are listed below.

=== Men ===
Athlete	NOC	Event	Olympics	Gold	Silver	Bronze	Total
Thorsten Margis	Germany	4-man 2-man	2018–2026	5	0	0	5
Francesco Friedrich	Germany	4-man 2-man	2018–2026	4	2	0	6
Kevin Kuske	Germany	4-man 2-man	2002–2018	4	2	0	6
André Lange	Germany	4-man 2-man	2002–2010	4	1	0	5
Bernhard Germeshausen	East Germany	4-man 2-man	1976–1980	3	1	0	4
Meinhard Nehmer	East Germany	4-man 2-man	1976–1980	3	0	1	4
Wolfgang Hoppe	East Germany; Germany	4-man 2-man	1984–1994	2	3	1	6
Eugenio Monti	Italy	4-man 2-man	1956, 1964–1968	2	2	2	6
Donat Acklin	Switzerland	4-man 2-man	1992–1994	2	1	1	4
Gustav Weder	Switzerland	4-man 2-man	1992–1994	2	1	1	4
Markus Zimmermann	Germany	4-man 2-man	1992–2002	2	1	1	4
Dietmar Schauerhammer	East Germany	4-man 2-man	1984–1988	2	1	0	3
Christoph Langen	Germany	4-man 2-man	1992, 1998–2002	2	0	2	4
Candy Bauer	Germany	4-man	2018-2022	2	0	0	2
Luciano De Paolis	Italy	4-man 2-man	1968	2	0	0	2
Billy Fiske	United States	4-man 5-man	1928–1932	2	0	0	2
Clifford Gray	United States	4-man 5-man	1928–1932	2	0	0	2
Olaf Hampel	Germany	4-man	1994–1998	2	0	0	2
Lorenz Nieberl	West Germany	4-man 2-man	1952	2	0	0	2
Andreas Ostler	West Germany	4-man 2-man	1952	2	0	0	2
Bogdan Musiol	East Germany; Germany	4-man 2-man	1980–1992	1	5	1	7
Joseph Benz	Switzerland	4-man 2-man	1976–1980	1	2	1	4
Bernhard Lehmann	East Germany	4-man 2-man	1976, 1984–1988	1	2	1	4
Erich Schärer	Switzerland	4-man 2-man	1976–1980	1	2	1	4
Steven Holcomb	United States	4-man 2-man	2010–2014	1	2	0	3
Patrick Martin	United States	4-man 2-man	1948–1952	1	2	0	3
Wolfgang Zimmerer	West Germany	4-man 2-man	1972–1976	1	1	2	4
Joseph Beerli	Switzerland	4-man 2-man	1936	1	1	0	2
Hans-Jürgen Gerhardt	East Germany	4-man 2-man	1980	1	1	0	2
Pierre Lueders	Canada	2-man	1994–2006	1	1	0	2
Kurt Meier	Switzerland	4-man	1988–1994	1	1	0	2
Jay O'Brien	United States	4-man 5-man	1928–1932	1	1	0	2
Martin Putze	Germany	4-man	2006–2010	1	1	0	2
Curtis Tomasevicz	United States	4-man	2010–2014	1	1	0	2
Beat Hefti	Switzerland	4-man 2-man	2002–2016, 2014	1	0	3	4
Oskars Melbārdis	Latvia	4-man 2-man	2014–2018	1	0	2	3
Peter Utzschneider	West Germany	4-man 2-man	1972–1976	1	0	2	3
Jean Wicki	Switzerland	4-man 2-man	1968–1972	1	0	2	3
Carsten Embach	Germany	4-man	1994–2002	1	0	1	2
Edy Hubacher	Switzerland	4-man 2-man	1972	1	0	1	2
Günther Huber	Italy	2-man	1994–1998	1	0	1	2
Jānis Ķipurs	Soviet Union	4-man 2-man	1988	1	0	1	2
Andreas Kirchner	East Germany	4-man	1980–1984	1	0	1	2
Vladimir Koslov	Soviet Union	4-man 2-man	1988	1	0	1	2
Justin Kripps	Canada	4-man 2-man	2018–2022	1	0	1	2
Jānis Strenga	Latvia	4-man 2-man	2014–2018	1	0	1	2
Roland Wetzig	East Germany	4-man	1980–1984	1	0	1	2

=== Women ===
Athlete	NOC	Event	Olympics	Gold	Silver	Bronze	Total
Kaillie Humphries	Canada; United States	2-woman	2010–2022	3	0	1	4
Heather Moyse	Canada	2-woman	2010–2014	2	0	0	2
Sandra Kiriasis	Germany	2-woman	2002–2010	1	1	0	2
Mariama Jamanka	Germany	2-woman	2018–2022	1	1	0	2

Elana Meyers Taylor from the United States has more Olympic bobsleigh medals than any other woman, but is yet to win a gold medal so far; her five medals comprise three silver and two bronze from 2010 through 2022.

== Medal table ==
Sources (after the 2026 Winter Olympics):
Accurate as of 2026 Winter Olympics.

Rank	Nation	Gold	Silver	Bronze	Total
1	Germany	19	13	8	40
2	Switzerland	10	10	12	32
3	United States	9	11	11	31
4	East Germany	5	5	3	13
5	Canada	5	2	4	11
6	Italy	4	4	4	12
7	West Germany	1	3	2	6
8	Austria	1	2	0	3
9	Great Britain	1	1	3	5
10	Latvia	1	0	2	3
10	Soviet Union	1	0	2	3
12	Belgium	0	1	1	2
12	Russia	0	1	1	2
14	South Korea	0	1	0	1
15	France	0	0	1	1
15	Romania	0	0	1	1
Totals (16 entries)		57	54	55	166

Notes

- 2 gold medals and no silver were awarded at 1998 two-man event
- 2 bronze medals awarded at 1998 four-man event
- 2 gold medals and no silver were awarded at 2018 two-man event
- 2 silver medals and no bronze were awarded at 2018 four-man event

== Number of bobsledders by nation ==
Nation	24	28	32	36	48	52	56	60	64	68	72	76	80	84	88	92	94	98	02	06	10	14	18	22	26	Years
American Samoa	–	–	–	–	–	–	–		–	–	–	–	–	–	–	–	2	–	–	–	–	–	–	–	–	1
Argentina	–	10	–	–	4	4	–		5	–	–	–	–	–	–	–	–	–	–	–	–	–	–	–	–	4
Armenia	–	–	–	–	–	–	–		–	–	–	–	–	–	–	–	2	–	2	–	–	–	–	–	–	2
Australia	–	–	–	–	–	–	–		–	–	–	–	–	–	5	2	4	4	–	4	7	6	4	2	4	10
Austria	–	10	2	12	–	8	9		9	9	8	10	8	8	8	8	9	8	4	5	5	6	12	10	12	22
Belgium	5	10	4	8	5	4	2		6	–	–	–	–	–	–	–	–	–	–	–	2	2	4	2	1	13
Bosnia and Herzegovina	–	–	–	–	–	–	–		–	–	–	–	–	–	–	–	5	5	–	–	–	–	–	–	–	2
Brazil	–	–	–	–	–	–	–		–	–	–	–	–	–	–	–	–	–	4	4	–	6	4	4	4	6
Bulgaria	–	–	–	–	–	–	–		–	–	–	–	–	–	5	5	2	–	2	–	–	–	–	–	–	4
Canada	–	–	–	–	–	–	–		8	6	6	10	6	4	9	9	8	8	8	12	12	16	18	18	14	17
China	–	–	–	–	–	–	–		–	–	–	–	–	–	–	–	–	–	–	–	–	–	6	12	12	3
Chinese Taipei	–	–	–	–	–	–	–		–	–	–	–	–	5	5	4	2	4	4	–	–	–	–	–	2	7
Croatia	–	–	–	–	–	–	–		–	–	–	–	–	–	–	–	–	–	4	4	5	–	4	–	–	4
Czech Republic	–	–	–	–	–	–	–		–	–	–	–	–	–	–	–	4	5	6	5	8	4	8	4	–	8
Czechoslovakia	–	–	–	8	4	–	–		–	–	–	2	–	–	–	6	–	–	–	–	–	–	–	–	–	4
France	8	10	2	10	10	5	4		–	10	6	5	–	4	–	9	8	5	9	5	–	8	5	6	6	20
East Germany	–	–	–	–	–	–	–		–	–	–	8	8	8	10	–	–	–	–	–	–	–	–	–	–	4
West Germany	–	–	–	–	–	–	–		–	8	8	8	10	10	8	–	–	–	–	–	–	–	–	–	–	6
United Team of Germany	–	–	–	–	–	–	10		9	–	–	–	–	–	–	–	–	–	–	–	–	–	–	–	–	2
Germany	–	10	9	10	–	6	–		–	–	–	–	–	–	–	12	12	9	13	14	18	18	18	18	18	14
Great Britain	8	10	–	4	10	–	8		8	8	8	8	10	10	8	8	8	7	14	6	8	8	10	6	6	22
Greece	–	–	–	–	–	–	–		–	–	–	–	–	–	–	–	2	4	2	–	–	–	–	–	–	3
Hungary	–	–	–	–	–	–	–		–	–	–	–	–	–	–	–	2	4	7	4	–	–	–	–	–	4
Ireland	–	–	–	–	–	–	–		–	–	–	–	–	–	–	4	–	5	2	–	2	–	–	–	–	4
Italy	10	5	4	10	10	8	10		8	10	9	9	5	9	9	8	9	8	9	12	8	4	4	9	10	24
Jamaica	–	–	–	–	–	–	–		–	–	–	–	–	–	4	5	4	6	2	–	–	2	2	5	5	9
Japan	–	–	–	–	–	–	–		–	–	8	4	2	4	4	4	5	9	5	4	6	4	–	–	–	12
Latvia	–	–	–	–	–	–	–		–	–	–	–	–	–	–	8	8	6	8	9	5	8	8	8	8	10
Liechtenstein	–	–	–	2	–	–	2		–	–	–	–	–	–	–	–	–	–	–	–	2	–	–	–	–	4
Luxembourg	–	5	–	4	–	–	–		–	–	–	–	–	–	–	–	–	–	–	–	–	–	–	–	–	2
Mexico	–	5	–	–	–	–	–		–	–	–	–	–	–	4	7	–	–	2	–	–	–	–	–	–	4
Monaco	–	–	–	–	–	–	–		–	–	–	–	–	–	2	5	4	4	5	2	2	2	2	2	–	10
Netherlands	–	5	–	2	–	–	–		–	–	–	–	–	2	–	–	2	–	8	8	4	6	–	5	–	10
Netherlands Antilles	–	–	–	–	–	–	–		–	–	–	–	–	–	2	2	–	–	–	–	–	–	–	–	–	2
New Zealand	–	–	–	–	–	–	–		–	–	–	–	–	–	5	–	–	2	4	4	–	–	–	–	–	4
Nigeria	–	–	–	–	–	–	–		–	–	–	–	–	–	–	–	–	–	–	–	–	–	2	–	–	1
Norway	–	–	–	–	8	9	4		–	–	–	–	–	–	–	2	–	4	4	–	–	–	–	–	–	6
Olympic Athletes from Russia	–	–	–	–	–	–	–		–	–	–	–	–	–	–	–	–	–	–	–	–	–	10	–	–	1
Poland	–	5	–	–	–	–	6		–	–	–	–	–	–	–	–	–	4	4	4	4	4	4	–	2	9
Portugal	–	–	–	–	–	–	–		–	–	–	–	–	–	5	–	–	–	–	–	–	–	–	–	–	1
Puerto Rico	–	–	–	–	–	–	–		–	–	–	–	–	–	–	4	5	5	–	–	–	–	–	–	–	3
ROC	–	–	–	–	–	–	–		–	–	–	–	–	–	–	–	–	–	–	–	–	–	–	12	–	1
Romania	–	10	4	9	–	–	8		5	5	5	8	8	5	5	5	4	6	6	6	6	8	7	6	4	21
Russia	–	–	–	–	–	–	–		–	–	–	–	–	–	–	–	6	6	10	11	17	16	–	–	–	6
San Marino	–	–	–	–	–	–	–		–	–	–	–	–	–	–	–	2	–	–	–	–	–	–	–	–	1
Serbia	–	–	–	–	–	–	–		–	–	–	–	–	–	–	–	–	–	–	–	4	2	–	–	–	2
Serbia and Montenegro	–	–	–	–	–	–	–		–	–	–	–	–	–	–	–	–	–	4	–	–	–	–	–	–	1
Slovakia	–	–	–	–	–	–	–		–	–	–	–	–	–	–	–	–	–	4	4	4	4	–	1	2	6
South Korea	–	–	–	–	–	–	–		–	–	–	–	–	–	–	–	–	–	–	–	4	10	6	9	10	5
Soviet Union	–	–	–	–	–	–	–		–	–	–	–	–	8	10	–	–	–	–	–	–	–	–	–	–	2
Spain	–	–	–	–	–	–	4		–	9	–	–	–	–	–	–	–	–	–	–	–	–	–	–	–	2
Sweden	–	–	–	–	–	9	9		6	6	4	4	4	4	2	–	4	–	2	–	–	–	–	–	–	11
Switzerland	8	10	4	8	8	8	8		8	9	8	8	8	11	10	8	10	10	10	12	8	9	10	12	19	24
Trinidad and Tobago	–	–	–	–	–	–	–		–	–	–	–	–	–	–	–	2	2	3	–	–	–	–	2	4	5
Ukraine	–	–	–	–	–	–	–		–	–	–	–	–	–	–	–	4	2	5	–	–	–	–	1	–	4
Unified Team	–	–	–	–	–	–	–		–	–	–	–	–	–	–	9	–	–	–	–	–	–	–	–	–	1
United States	–	10	12	11	12	10	11		9	10	9	9	9	10	9	12	10	8	13	12	18	16	16	12	14	23
Virgin Islands	–	–	–	–	–	–	–		–	–	–	–	–	–	4	8	6	6	6	–	–	–	–	–	–	5
Yugoslavia	–	–	–	–	–	–	–		–	–	–	–	–	9	2	5	–	–	–	–	–	–	–	–	–	3
Nations	5	14	8	13	9	10	13	-	11	11	11	13	11	16	23	25	30	28	34	22	23	23	21	23	18	59
Bobsledders	39	115	41	99	71	71	93	-	81	90	79	93	78	111	135	159	155	156	195	150	159	169	164	165	170	2176
Year	24	28	32	36	48	52	56	60	64	68	72	76	80	84	88	92	94	98	02	06	10	14	18	22	26	26

== See also ==
- List of Olympic venues in bobsleigh
