= Italy at the 1932 Winter Olympics =

- IOC code: ITA
- NOC: Italian National Olympic Committee
- Website: www.coni.it (in Italian)

in Lake Placid
- Competitors: 12 (men) in 4 sports
- Flag bearer: Erminio Sertorelli
- Medals: Gold 0 Silver 0 Bronze 0 Total 0

Winter Olympics appearances (overview)
- 1924; 1928; 1932; 1936; 1948; 1952; 1956; 1960; 1964; 1968; 1972; 1976; 1980; 1984; 1988; 1992; 1994; 1998; 2002; 2006; 2010; 2014; 2018; 2022; 2026

Italy participated at the 1932 Winter Olympics in Lake Placid, United States, held between 4 and 13 February 1932. The country's participation in the Games marked its third appearance at the Winter Olympics since its debut in the inaugural 1924 Games.

The Italian team consisted of 12 athletes who competed across four sports. Cross-country skier Erminio Sertorelli was the country's flag-bearer during the opening ceremony. Italy had not won any medals in the previous Winter Games, and did not win any medals in the 1932 event.

== Background ==
The Italian National Olympic Committee was formed in 1908 for the 1908 Summer Olympics, and was only recognized by the International Olympic Committee (IOC) in 1915. However, competition records indicate later that Italian athletes competed in the inaugural edition of the Summer Olympics in 1896. The nation competed in the inaugural Winter Olympics held in 1924 in France. This edition of the Games marked the nation's third appearance at the Winter Games.

The 1932 Winter Olympics in Lake Placid, United States, held between 4 and 13 February 1932. The Italian delegation consisted of 12 athletes competing across four sports. Cross-country skier Erminio Sertorelli was the country's flag-bearer during the opening ceremony. Italy had not won any medals in the previous Winter Games, and did not win any medals in the 1932 event.

== Competitors ==
There were 12 athletes (all men) who took part in the medal events across four sports. Individual athletes competed across multiple sports. Severino Menardi took part in three events across three different sports.

Sport	Men	Women	Athletes
Bobsleigh	4	0	4
Cross-country skiing	6	0	6
Nordic combined	3	0	3
Ski jumping	3	0	3
Total	12	0	12 (Note: Overall count will not add upto the individual tally as there are athletes who competed in multiple sports.)

== Bobsleigh ==
Bobsleigh competitions were held between 8 and 15 February at Mt. Van Hoevenberg Recreation Area in Lake Placid. Italy entered four athletes across two events in the competition. In the two-man event, the best placed team of Teofilo Rossi di Montelera and Italo Casini finished sixth. In the subsequent four-man event, the German team of di Montelera, Casini, Agostino Lanfranchi, and Gaetano Lanfranchi again finished sixth with a combined time of just over eight minutes and 24 seconds across four runs.

Sled	Athletes	Event	Run 1		Run 2		Run 3		Run 4		Total	
Sled	Athletes	Event	Time	Rank	Time	Rank	Time	Rank	Time	Rank	Time	Rank
ITA-1	Italo Casini; Teofilo Rossi di Montelera	Two-man	2:15.45	6	2:08.10	5	2:06.58	6	2:06.20	6	8:36.33	6
ITA-2	Agostino Lanfranchi; Gaetano Lanfranchi	Two-man	2:20.08	10	2:13.47	8	2:08.00	7	2:09.11	7	8:50.66	8

Sled	Athletes	Event	Run 1		Run 2		Run 3		Run 4		Total	
Sled	Athletes	Event	Time	Rank	Time	Rank	Time	Rank	Time	Rank	Time	Rank
ITA-1	Agostino Lanfranchi; Gaetano Lanfranchi; Italo Casini; Teofilo Rossi di Montelera	Four-man	2:07.87	5	2:06.62	5	2:07.94	7	2:01.78	6	8:24.21	5

== Cross-country skiing ==
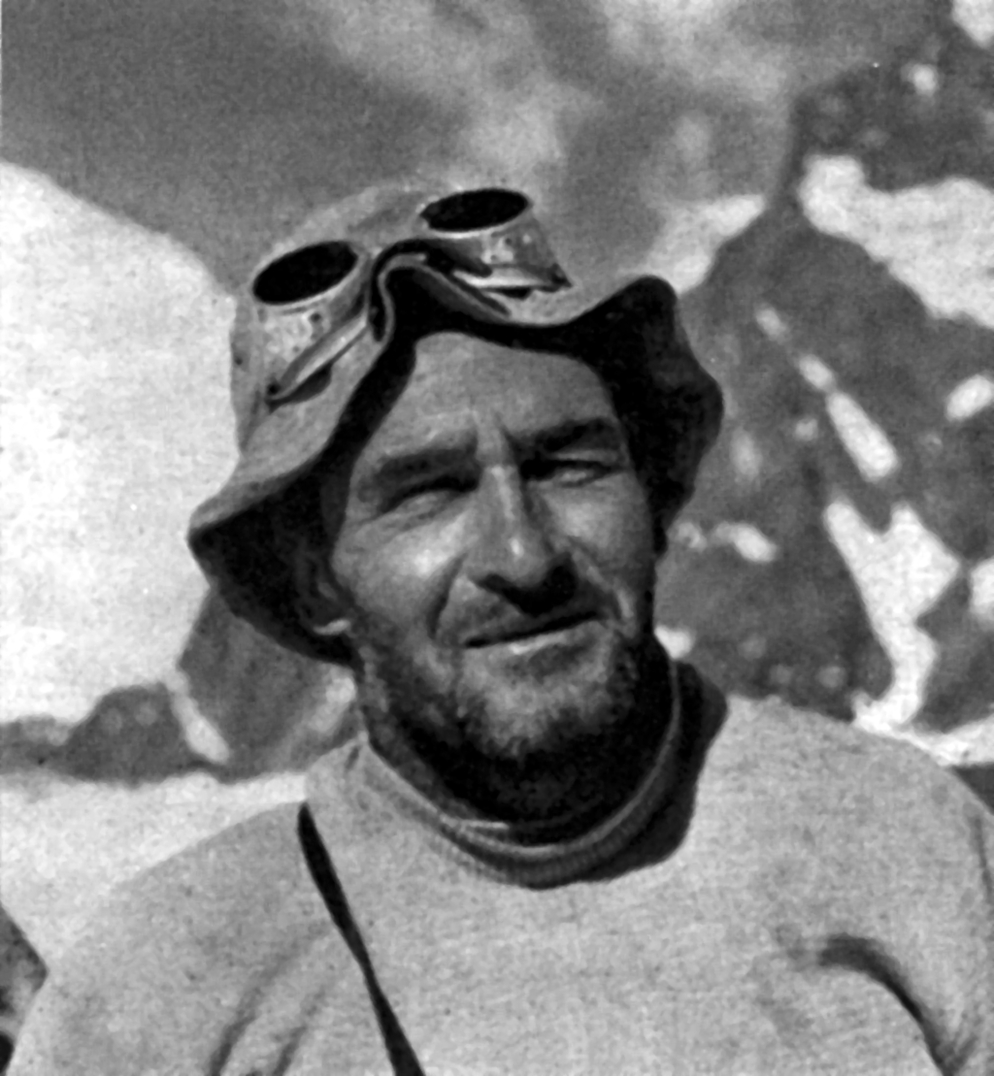
Gino Soldà competed in the men's 18 km event

Cross-country skiing competitions were held between 10 and 13 February at James C. Sheffield Speed Skating Oval in Lake Placid. The Italian trio of Severino Menardi, Gino Soldà, and Andrea Vuerich competed in the men's 18 km event with Vuerich the best placed finisher. Amongst the trio of Francesco de Zulian, Giovanni Delago, and Erminio Sertorelli who competed in the men's 50 km event, only Sertorelli completed the course in 12th place.

Athlete	Event	Time	Rank
Andrea Vuerich	Men's 18 km	1'38:42	25
Gino Soldà	Men's 18 km	1'39:43	26
Severino Menardi	Men's 18 km	1'43:04	34
Erminio Sertorelli	Men's 50 km	4'59:00	12
Francesco de Zulian	Men's 50 km	DNF	–
Giovanni Delago	Men's 50 km	DNF	–

== Nordic combined ==
Nordic combined competitions were held between 10 and 11 February at James C. Sheffield Speed Skating Oval in Lake Placid. The competition consisted of two events–Normal hill ski jumping and 18 km cross-country skiing, and the final results were determined based on points from both the events. Menardi was joined by ski jumpers Ingenuino Dallagio and Ernesto Zardini for the event. Of the trio, Zardini was the closest to the medal placings after finishing 12th amongst the 33 finishers.

Athlete	Event	Cross-country			Ski Jumping				Total	
Athlete	Event	Time	Points	Rank	Distance 1	Distance 2	Total points	Rank	Points	Rank
Ernesto Zardini	Individual	1'43:22	163.50	20	51.0	51.5	198.7	13	362.20	12
Ingenuino Dallagio	Individual	1'46:29	150.00	23	47.5	52.0	196.0	16	346.00	17
Severino Menardi	Individual	1'43:04	165.00	19	36.0	45.5	167.7	26	332.70	21

== Ski jumping ==
Ski jumping competitions were held between 10 and 11 February at James C. Sheffield Speed Skating Oval in Lake Placid. The same trio of Dallagio, Menardi and Zardini, who competed in the Nordic combined event, participated in the event. Of the trio, Zardini was again the best placed finished in 14th place in the overall classification.

Athlete	Event	Jump 1			Jump 2			Total	
Athlete	Event	Distance	Points	Rank	Distance	Points	Rank	Points	Rank
Ernesto Zardini	Individual	53.0	92.5	20	65.0	104.2	11	196.7	14
Ingenuino Dallagio	Individual	58.5	101.4	11	53.0	93.5	22	194.9	16
Severino Menardi	Individual	36.5	70.2	30	56.5	91.4	24	161.6	27
