= Venues of the 1932 Winter Olympics =

For the 1932 Winter Olympics in Lake Placid, New York, United States, a total of five sports venues were used. This was unchanged from the previous games in St. Moritz. For the first time in the history of the Winter Olympics, an indoor venue was used for the figure skating and six of the twelve ice hockey events at the Olympic Arena. The first bobsleigh venue outside Europe was constructed for use. Four 18 km and five 50 km venues were submitted for approval prior to the Olympics. After the 1932 games, three of these venues served as host for their respective championships that were held outside Europe for the first time.

== Venues ==
Venue	Sports	Capacity	Ref.
Intervales Ski-Hill	Nordic combined (ski jumping), Ski jumping	9,200	
Lake Placid	Cross-country skiing, Nordic combined (cross-country skiing)	Not listed.	
Mt. Van Hoevenberg Bob-Run	Bobsleigh	12,500	
Olympic Arena	Figure skating, Ice hockey (final)	3,360	
Olympic Stadium	Ice hockey, Speed skating	7,475	

== Before the Olympics ==
The first ski jump was constructed in Lake Placid in 1920. It had a 35 m (115 ft) hill. Three years later, the hill was rebuilt that was 50 m (160 ft) long. Finally, the hill was made 60 m (200 ft) long in 1927.

Cross-country skiing trails took place around the hills of Lake Placid. Maintenance of the trails were first done by the New York State Conservation Department (New York State Department of Environmental Conservation since 1970) Within a 10 mi (16 km) radius around Lake Placid at the time of the 1932 Games, there were 250 mi (400 km) worth of good ski trails. Despite this, an additional 70 mi (110 km) had to be built and were accurately measured with steel tape to the nearest 1 km (0.62 mi) in order to meet the requirements of the International Ski Federation (FIS). Four courses for the 18 km event and five courses for the 50 km event were submitted to the FIS.

The Stadium was constructed at the local high school. This purchase was approved by the village in 1929 following a series of local board meetings. A total 7.3 acres (3.0 ha) was leased by the Park Commission from the Lake Placid Board of Education that would run until 2028. Construction began in December 1929 and was completed by November 1931. At the arena was a 400 m (1,300 ft) long, circular track used for speed skating.

The Arena was an idea of Godfrey Dewey, president of the Organizing Committee, after he saw what sudden thaws had done to the Winter Olympics both in Chamonix and in St. Moritz. A visit by International Olympic Committee President Count Henri de Baillet-Latour in September 1930 encouraged Dewey to construct the indoor arena. This was approved at a board meeting later that month to investigation. Discussions ensued among the Olympic organizers until a site was approved in April 1931. Property was purchased in June of that year followed by an approval of a municipal bond in July. Construction took place between August 1931 and January 1932. Over 9 mi (14 km) of steel pipes were laid down on the floor to help make the ice.

The Bob Run was constructed during August–December 1930 and opened on Christmas Day 1930. This was done after site selection was met with protest over the use of the track in state-owned lands.

== During the Olympics ==
Ice hockey was initially scheduled to have ten of their twelve games at the Stadium while two would be at the arena. A thawing in the ice outdoors forced four of the hockey games to be moved indoors to the arena.

Weather also gave problems for the four-man bobsleigh event that were so bad that it delayed the finals until after the closing ceremony. Officials wanted to have all four runs be done on 14 February. After the second run, American bobsledder F. Paul Stevens protested the racing conditions of the track by walking off. Most of the other bobsledders followed Stevens. The final two runs were set on the 15th as a result.

The 50 km event on 13 February was held in a raging blizzard. Skiers and officials argued about the course itself, delaying the start of the race for three hours. Despite this, it produced the closest 50 km race in Olympic history then when Finland's Veli Saarinen defeated his fellow countryman Väinö Liikkanen by 20 seconds. This record would stand until the 1968 Winter Olympics, when Norway's Ole Ellefsæter beat out the Soviet Union's Vyacheslav Vedenin by 16.7 seconds.

== After the Olympics ==
Three of the venues would become host to events that were held outside of Europe for the first time. After the 1932 Games, the Stadium hosted the World Allround Speed Skating Championships for Men (Women's would not take place officially until 1936.). The bob track would host the International Bobsleigh World Championships in 1949. In 1950, the FIS Nordic World Ski Championships, the ski jumping and the ski jumping part of the Nordic combined event took place at the ski jump used for the 1932 games.
