= Kristian Hovde =

Norwegian cross-country skier

Medal record

Men's cross-country skiing

Representing Norway

World Championships
Silver medal – second place	1931 Oberhof	18 km

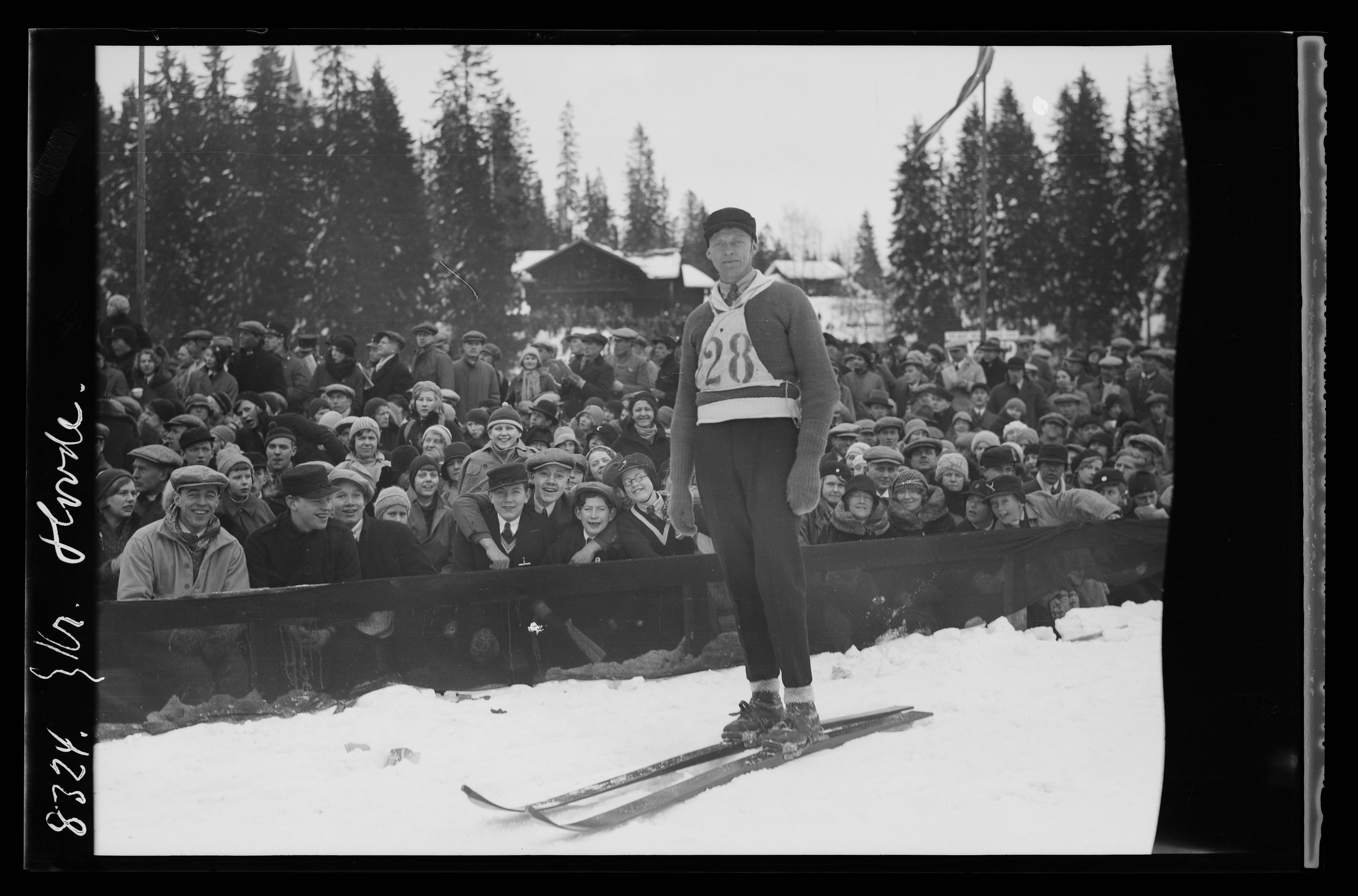
Black-and-white photo of Kristian Hovde

Kristian Hovde (6 December 1903 – 19 August 1969) was a Norwegian cross-country skier who competed in the late 1920s in the early 1930s.

He was born in Vikersund.

Hovde won a silver in the 18 km event at the 1931 FIS Nordic World Ski Championships.

At the 1932 Winter Olympics he finished 13th in the 18 km cross-country skiing event.

== Cross-country skiing results ==
All results are sourced from the International Ski Federation (FIS).

=== Olympic Games ===
Year	Age	18 km	50 km
1932	28	13	—

=== World Championships ===
- 1 medal – (1 silver)

Year	Age	17 km	18 km	50 km
1930	26	4	—N/a	16
1931	27	—N/a	Silver	5
