= Sigurd Vestad =

Sigurd Vestad (July 31, 1907 – January 17, 2001) was a Norwegian cross-country skier who competed in the 1932 Winter Olympics.

He was born in Trysil Municipality.

In 1932 he finished fifth in the 50 km competition.

At the FIS Nordic World Ski Championships 1935 he finished fourth in the 18 km competition.

== Cross-country skiing results ==
All results are sourced from the International Ski Federation (FIS).

=== Olympic Games ===
| Year | Age | 18 km | 50 km |
|---|---|---|---|
| 1932 | 24 | — | 5 |

=== World Championships ===
| Year | Age | 17 km | 18 km | 50 km | 4 × 10 km relay |
|---|---|---|---|---|---|
| 1930 | 22 | 19 | —N/a | 12 | —N/a |
| 1934 | 26 | —N/a | 15 | DNF | — |
| 1935 | 27 | —N/a | 4 | 15 | — |
