= Sertorelli =

Sertorelli is an Italian surname. Notable people with the surname include:

- Erminio Sertorelli (1901–1979), Italian cross-country skier
- Giacinto Sertorelli (1914–1938), Italian alpine skier
- Stefano Sertorelli (1911–1994), Italian soldier and skier
