= Lappalainen =

Lappalainen is a Finnish surname. Notable people with the surname include:

- Joonas Lappalainen (born 1998), Finnish racing driver
- Kalle Lappalainen (1877–1965), Finnish sport shooter
- Konsta Lappalainen (born 2001), Finnish racing driver
- Lasse Lappalainen (born 1989), Finnish ice hockey player
- Martti Lappalainen (1902–1941), Finnish cross-country skier and biathlete
- Onni Lappalainen (1922–1971), Finnish gymnast
- Petri Lappalainen (born 1964), Finnish racing driver and founder of KIC Motorsport
- Tauno Lappalainen (1898–1973), Finnish cross-country skier
- Lassi Lappalainen (born 1998), Finnish footballer
