= France at the 1932 Winter Olympics =

- IOC code: FRA
- NOC: French Olympic Committee

in Lake Placid
- Competitors: 8 (7 men, 1 woman) in 3 sports
- Medals Ranked 7th: Gold 1 Silver 0 Bronze 0 Total 1

Winter Olympics appearances (overview)
- 1924; 1928; 1932; 1936; 1948; 1952; 1956; 1960; 1964; 1968; 1972; 1976; 1980; 1984; 1988; 1992; 1994; 1998; 2002; 2006; 2010; 2014; 2018; 2022; 2026

France competed at the 1932 Winter Olympics in Lake Placid, United States.

== Medalists ==
Medal	Name	Sport	Event
Gold	Andrée Brunet; Pierre Brunet	Figure skating	Pairs

== Bobsleigh ==
Sled	Athletes	Event	Run 1		Run 2		Run 3		Run 4		Total	
Sled	Athletes	Event	Time	Rank	Time	Rank	Time	Rank	Time	Rank	Time	Rank
FRA-1	Louis Balsan; Daniel Armand-Delille	Two-man	2:20.10	11	2:19.37	11	2:13.56	10	2:09.56	8	9:02.59	11

== Cross-country skiing ==
Men

Event	Athlete	Race	
Event	Athlete	Time	Rank
18 km	Raymond Berthet	1'43:38	36
18 km	Paul Mugnier	1'41:34	30
18 km	Albert Secrétant	1'38:39	24
18 km	Léonce Cretin	1'36:42	19

== Figure skating ==
Pairs

Athletes	Points	Score	Final rank
Andreé Brunet; Pierre Brunet	12	76.7	1st place, gold medalist(s)
