= Cross-country skiing at the 1932 Winter Olympics – Men's 18 kilometre =

Men's 18 kilometre at the III Olympic Winter Games
- Dates: 10 February 1932
- Competitors: 42 from 11 nations
- Winning time: 1:23:07

Medalists
1st place, gold medalist(s)		Sven Utterström	Sweden
2nd place, silver medalist(s)		Axel Wikström	Sweden
3rd place, bronze medalist(s)		Veli Saarinen	Finland

The shorter cross-country skiing event of the cross-country skiing at the 1932 Winter Olympics programme was contested of a distance of 19.7 kilometres. It was the third appearance of the event, but the only time this race was held over a distance of 19.7 kilometres. The competition was held on Wednesday, 10 February 1932. Forty-two cross-country skiers from eleven nations competed.

== Medalists ==
Gold	Silver	Bronze
Sven Utterström; Sweden	Axel Wikström; Sweden	Veli Saarinen; Finland

== Results ==
Place	Competitor	Time
1	Sven Utterström (SWE)	1'23:07
2	Axel Wikström (SWE)	1'25:07
3	Veli Saarinen (FIN)	1'25:24
4	Martti Lappalainen (FIN)	1'26:31
5	Arne Rustadstuen (NOR)	1'27:06
6	Johan Grøttumsbråten (NOR)	1'27:15
7	Valmari Toikka (FIN)	1'27:51
8	Ole Stenen (NOR)	1'28:05
9	Väinö Liikkanen (FIN)	1'28:30
10	Nils Svärd (SWE)	1'29:05
11	Sivert Mattsson (SWE)	1'29:54
12	Heigoro Kuriyagawa (JPN)	1'31:34
13	Kristian Hovde (NOR)	1'32:48
14	Vladimír Novák (TCH)	1'32:59
15	Takemitsu Tsubokawa (JPN)	1'33:15
16	Antonín Bartoň (TCH)	1'33:39
17	Takeo Hoshina (JPN)	1'35:47
18	Bronisław Czech (POL)	1'36:37
19	Léonce Crétin (FRA)	1'36:42
20	Jaroslav Feistauer (TCH)	1'37:55
21	Harald Bosio (AUT)	1'38:23
22	Ján Cífka (TCH)	1'38:24
23	Ole Zetterstrom (USA)	1'38:26
24	Albert Secrétant (FRA)	1'38:39
25	Andrea Vuerich (ITA)	1'38:42
26	Gino Soldà (ITA)	1'39:43
27	Stanisław Marusarz (POL)	1'39:56
28	Richard Parsons (USA)	1'40:08
29	Harald Paumgarten (AUT)	1'41:20
30	Paul Mugnier (FRA)	1'41:34
31	Stanisław Skupień (POL)	1'41:48
32	Zdzisław Motyka (POL)	1'41:58
33	Rolf Monsen (USA)	1'42:36
34	Severino Menardi (ITA)	1'43:04
35	Arthur Pangman (CAN)	1'43:12
36	Raymond Berthet (FRA)	1'43:38
37	Saburo Iwasaki (JPN)	1'44:07
38	William Clark (CAN)	1'46:33
39	John Taylor (CAN)	1'48:11
40	John Currie (CAN)	1'49:03
41	Gregor Höll (AUT)	1'55:18
42	Erling Andersen (USA)	1'58:13
