= Nils Svärd =

Swedish cross-country skier

Medal record

Men's cross-country skiing

Representing Sweden

World Championships
Bronze medal – third place	1931 Oberhof	18 km

Nils E. Svärd (July 10, 1908 in Östersund, Jämtland – August 6, 2001) was a Swedish cross-country skier who competed in the early 1930s.

He won a bronze in the 18 km event at the 1931 FIS Nordic World Ski Championships.

At the 1932 Winter Olympics he finished tenth in the 18 km event.

== Cross-country skiing results ==
All results are sourced from the International Ski Federation (FIS).

=== Olympic Games ===
Year	Age	18 km	50 km
1932	23	10	—

=== World Championships ===
- 1 medal – (1 bronze)

Year	Age	18 km	50 km
1931	22	Bronze	—
