= Toikka =

Toikka is a Finnish surname.

== Geographical distribution ==
As of 2014, 90.1% of all known bearers of the surname Toikka were residents of Finland (frequency 1:3,461), 3.2% of the United States (1:6,337,742), 3.1% of Estonia (1:24,475) and 1.1% of Sweden (1:518,251) and 1.0% of Canada (1:2,164,589).

In Finland, the frequency of the surname was higher than national average (1:3,461) in the following regions:

1. Kymenlaakso (1:372)
2. South Karelia (1:693)
3. Uusimaa (1:3,095)

== People ==
- Amy Toikka Finnish Model
- Oiva Toikka, Finnish glass designer.
- Markku Toikka, Finnish comedian
- Valmari Toikka (1902–1990), Finnish skier
