= Cross-country skiing at the 1932 Winter Olympics – Men's 50 kilometre =

Men's 50 kilometre at the III Olympic Winter Games
- Cross-country skiing
- Dates: 13 February 1932
- Competitors: 32 from 9 nations
- Winning time: 4:28:00

Medalists
1st place, gold medalist(s)		Veli Saarinen	Finland
2nd place, silver medalist(s)		Väinö Liikkanen	Finland
3rd place, bronze medalist(s)		Arne Rustadstuen	Norway

The 50 kilometre cross-country skiing event was part of the cross-country skiing at the 1932 Winter Olympics programme. It was the third appearance of the event. The competition was held on Saturday, 13 February 1932. Thirty-two cross-country skiers from nine nations competed.

== Medalists ==
Gold	Silver	Bronze
Veli Saarinen; Finland	Väinö Liikkanen; Finland	Arne Rustadstuen; Norway

== Results ==
Place	Competitor	Time
1	Veli Saarinen (FIN)	4'28:00
2	Väinö Liikkanen (FIN)	4'28:20
3	Arne Rustadstuen (NOR)	4'31:53
4	Ole Hegge (NOR)	4'32:04
5	Sigurd Vestad (NOR)	4'32:40
6	Sven Utterström (SWE)	4'33:25
7	Tauno Lappalainen (FIN)	4'45:02
8	John Lindgren (SWE)	4'47:42
9	Gustaf Jonsson (SWE)	4'49:52
10	Antonín Bartoň (TCH)	4'52:24
11	Vladimír Novák (TCH)	4'52:44
12	Erminio Sertorelli (ITA)	4'59:00
13	Jaroslav Feistauer (TCH)	5'00:19
14	Jan Cífka (TCH)	5'01:50
15	Richard E. Parsons (USA)	5'13:59
16	Kaare Engstad (CAN)	5'19:19
17	Iwao Ageishi (JPN)	5'19:31
18	Saburo Iwasaki (JPN)	5'21:40
19	Nils Backstrom (USA)	5'25:40
20	Robert Reid (USA)	5'26:06
–	Norton Billings (USA)	DNF
–	Giovanni Delago (ITA)	DNF
–	Francesco Dezulian (ITA)	DNF
–	Hubert Douglas (CAN)	DNF
–	Heigoro Kuriyagawa (JPN)	DNF
–	Martti Lappalainen (FIN)	DNF
–	Sivert Mattsson (SWE)	DNF
–	Zdzisław Motyka (POL)	DNF
–	Walter Ryan (CAN)	DNF
–	Stanisław Skupień (POL)	DNF
–	Ole Stenen (NOR)	DNF
–	Kinzo Tanguchi (JPN)	DNF
