= Finland at the 1932 Winter Olympics =

- IOC code: FIN
- NOC: Finnish Olympic Committee
- Website: sport.fi/olympiakomitea (in Finnish and Swedish)

in Lake Placid
- Competitors: 7 (men) in 3 sports
- Flag bearer: Ossi Blomqvist
- Medals Ranked 5th: Gold 1 Silver 1 Bronze 1 Total 3

Winter Olympics appearances (overview)
- 1924; 1928; 1932; 1936; 1948; 1952; 1956; 1960; 1964; 1968; 1972; 1976; 1980; 1984; 1988; 1992; 1994; 1998; 2002; 2006; 2010; 2014; 2018; 2022; 2026

Finland competed at the 1932 Winter Olympics in Lake Placid, New York, United States. Finland has competed at every Winter Olympic Games.

== Medalists ==
Medal	Name	Sport	Event
Gold	Veli Saarinen	Cross-country skiing	Men's 50 km
Silver	Väinö Liikkanen	Cross-country skiing	Men's 50 km
Bronze	Veli Saarinen	Cross-country skiing	Men's 18 km

== Cross-country skiing ==
Men

Event	Athlete	Race	
Event	Athlete	Time	Rank
18 km	Väinö Liikkanen	1'28:30	9
18 km	Valmari Toikka	1'27:51	7
18 km	Martti Lappalainen	1'26:31	4
18 km	Veli Saarinen	1'25:24	3rd place, bronze medalist(s)
50 km	Martti Lappalainen	DNF	–
50 km	Tauno Lappalainen	4'45:02	7
50 km	Väinö Liikkanen	4'28:20	2nd place, silver medalist(s)
50 km	Veli Saarinen	4'28:00	1st place, gold medalist(s)

== Figure skating ==
Men

Athlete	Event	CF	FS	Places	Points	Final rank
Marcus Nikkanen	Men's singles	4	4	28	2420.1	4

== Speed skating ==
Men

Event	Athlete	Heat		Final	
Event	Athlete	Time	Position	Time	Position
1500 m	Ossi Blomqvist	n/a	5	Did not advance	
5000m	Ossi Blomqvist	n/a	5	Did not advance	
10,000 m	Ossi Blomqvist	n/a	5	Did not advance	
