= Ski jumping at the 1932 Winter Olympics =

Ski jumping at the III Olympic Winter Games
- Venue: Lake Placid Olympic Ski Jumping Complex
- Dates: February 12, 1932
- Competitors: 34 from 10 nations
- Winning Score: 228.1

Medalists
1st place, gold medalist(s)		Birger Ruud	Norway
2nd place, silver medalist(s)		Hans Beck	Norway
3rd place, bronze medalist(s)		Kåre Walberg	Norway

At the 1932 Winter Olympics one individual ski jumping event was contested. It was held on Friday, February 12, 1932.

== Medalists ==
Event	Gold	Silver	Bronze
individual	Birger Ruud; Norway	Hans Beck; Norway	Kaare Wahlberg; Norway

== Results ==
The competition took place at "Intervales Hill" with a K-Point of 61 meters.

Place	Ski jumper	Total
1	Birger Ruud (NOR)	228.1
2	Hans Beck (NOR)	227.0
3	Kaare Wahlberg (NOR)	219.5
4	Sven Eriksson (SWE)	218.9
5	Caspar Oimoen (USA)	216.7
6	Fritz Kaufmann (SUI)	215.8
7	Sigmund Ruud (NOR)	215.1
8	Goro Adachi (JPN)	210.7
9	Cesare Chiogna (SUI)	209.8
10	Erik Rylander (SWE)	206.0
11	Holger Schön (SWE)	201.8
12	Bronisław Czech (POL)	200.7
13	Peder Falstad (USA)	199.5
14	Ernesto Zardini (ITA)	196.7
15	John Steele (USA)	196.7
16	Ingenuino Dallagio (ITA)	194.9
17	Stanisław Marusarz (POL)	192.5
18	Fritz Steuri (SUI)	192.4
19	Bob Lymburne (CAN)	192.1
20	Jacques Landry (CAN)	187.3
21	Antonín Bartoň (TCH)	186.1
22	Andrzej Marusarz (POL)	185.9
23	František Šimůnek (TCH)	183.2
24	Ján Cífka (TCH)	172.5
25	Harald Paumgarten (AUT)	163.4
26	Jaroslav Feistauer (TCH)	163.0
27	Severino Menardi (ITA)	161.6
28	Mitsutake Makita (JPN)	134.2
29	Arnold Stone (CAN)	114.5
30	Leslie Gagne (CAN)	110.5
31	Yoichi Takata (JPN)	91.1
32	Katsumi Yamada (JPN)	70.0
—	Roy Mikkelsen (USA)	(52.0)
—	Harald Bosio (AUT)	(29.0)

== Participating nations ==
A total of 34 ski jumpers from ten nations competed at the Lake Placid Games:

- Austria (2)
- Canada (4)
- Czechoslovakia (4)
- Italy (3)
- Japan (4)
- Norway (4)
- Poland (3)
- Sweden (3)
- Switzerland (3)
- United States (4)
