= Makita (disambiguation) =

Makita refers to a Japanese manufacturer of power tools.

Makita may also refer to:

== People ==
- Aju Makita (b. 2002), a Japanese actress
- Destin Makita (b. 1984), a Congolese former professional football player
- François Makita (b. 1963), a Congolese former professional football player
- Kazuhisa Makita (b. 1984), a Japanese former professional baseball pitcher
- Mitsutake Makita (1908-unknown), a Japanese ski jumper.
- Sako Makita (b. 1993), a Japanese choreographer and former member of the Japanese girl group Passpo
- Seiichi Makita (b. 1968), a Japanese former professional football player
- Tetsuji Makita, founder of Japanese automaker Tokyu Kogyo Kurogane
- Tetsuya Makita (b. 1984), a Japanese actor

== Other ==
- Dolmar, a former German chainsaw manufacturer now named Makita Engineering Germany GmbH
- Makita, Estonia, a village in southeastern Estonia
- Makita River, a river in Japan
