= Gstrein =

Gstrein is a surname. Notable people with the surname include:

- Bernhard Gstrein (born 1965), Austrian alpine skier
- Fabio Gstrein (born 1997), Austrian alpine skier
- Hugo Gstrein, Austrian cross-country skier
- Josl Gstrein (1917–1980), Austrian cross-country and Nordic combined skier
- Norbert Gstrein (born 1961), Austrian writer
