= Sven Utterström =

Swedish cross-country skier

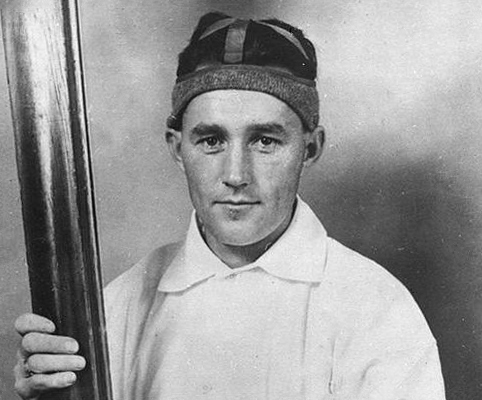
- Sven Utterström in 1932

Personal information
- Full name: Sven Ludvig Utterström
- Born: 16 May 1901 Boden, Sweden
- Died: 7 May 1979 (aged 77) Boden, Sweden

Sport
- Sport: Skiing
- Club: Bodens BK
Medal record
Men's cross-country skiing
Representing Sweden
Olympic Games
Gold medal – first place	1932 Lake Placid	18 km
World Championships
Gold medal – first place	1930 Oslo	50 km
Gold medal – first place	1933 Innsbruck	4 × 10 km relay
Silver medal – second place	1933 Innsbruck	50 km

Sven "Uttern" Ludvig Utterström (16 May 1901 – 7 May 1979) was a Swedish skier who competed in cross-country skiing.

He was born in Boden, Sweden, raced for Bodens BK, and won several medals at the Winter Olympics, the FIS Nordic World Ski Championships, and the Holmenkollen ski festival.

Utterström won the 50 km cross-country event at the Holmenkollen ski festival in 1929 and 1930. He was only the third non-Norwegian to win any event there (Finland's Anton Collin and Martti Lappalainen were the first two, winning the 50 km in 1922 and 1928, respectively.).

At the 1928 Winter Olympics he finished ninth in the 18 km competition.

Four years later at the 1932 Winter Olympics, Utterström won the 18 km. In the 50 km event he finished sixth.

In 1930, he won the 50 km at the FIS Nordic World Ski Championships and was on the 4 × 10 km relay that won the inaugural event at the 1933 Nordic skiing World Championships. He also won a silver in the 50 km at the 1933 event as well.

Utterström also won the Svenska Dagbladet Gold Medal in 1929 (Shared with Gillis Grafström).

== Cross-country skiing results ==
All results are sourced from the International Ski Federation (FIS).

=== Olympic Games ===
- 1 medal – (1 gold)

Year	Age	18 km	50 km
1928	26	9	—
1932	30	Gold	6

=== World Championships ===
- 3 medals – (2 gold, 1 silver)

Year	Age	17 km	18 km	50 km	4 × 10 km relay
1930	28	9	—N/a	Gold	—N/a
1933	31	—N/a	5	Silver	Gold

Preceded by Per-Erik Hedlund	Svenska Dagbladet Gold Medal with Gillis Grafström; 1929	Succeeded by Johan Richthoff
