= Erling Andersen =

Erling Andersen can refer to:

- Erling Andersen (athlete) (born 1960), Norwegian race walker
- Erling Andersen (cross-country skier) (1905–1993), American cross-country skier
- Erling Andersen (footballer) (1901–1969), Norwegian footballer
