= Sivert Mattsson =

Swedish cross-country skier

Sivert Mattsson (September 9, 1907, Edefors, Norrbotten – March 20, 1999) was a Swedish cross-country skier who competed in the 1932 Winter Olympics.

In 1932 he finished eleventh in the 18 km race. He also participated in the 50 km race but did not finish.

== Cross-country skiing results ==
=== Olympic Games ===
Year	Age	18 km	50 km
1932	24	11	DNF
