= List of flag bearers for Czechoslovakia at the Olympics =

Czechoslovakia at the Olympics
- IOC code: TCH
- NOC: Czechoslovak Olympic Committee
- Medals: Gold 51 Silver 57 Bronze 60 Total 168

Summer appearances
- 1920; 1924; 1928; 1932; 1936; 1948; 1952; 1956; 1960; 1964; 1968; 1972; 1976; 1980; 1984; 1988; 1992

Winter appearances
- 1924; 1928; 1932; 1936; 1948; 1952; 1956; 1960; 1964; 1968; 1972; 1976; 1980; 1984; 1988; 1992

Other related appearances
- Bohemia (1900–1912); Czech Republic (1994–); Slovakia (1994–)

This is a list of flag bearers who have represented Czechoslovakia at the Olympics.

Flag bearers carry the national flag of their country at the opening ceremony of the Olympic Games.

#	Event year	Season	Flag bearer	Sport
1	1920	Summer	Ladislav Žemla	Tennis
2	1924	Winter	Jaroslav Řezáč	Ice hockey
3	1924	Summer	František Janda-Suk	Athletics
4	1928	Summer	Josef Effenberger	Gymnastics
5	1932	Winter	Antonín Bartoň	Cross-country skiing
6	1936	Summer	Josef Klapuch	Wrestling
7	1948	Winter	Vladimír Zábrodský	Ice hockey
8	1948	Summer	Ladislav Trpkoš	Basketball
9	1952	Winter	Václav Bubník	Ice hockey
10	1952	Summer	Vít Matlocha	Wrestling
11	1956	Winter	Václav Bubník	Ice hockey
12	1956	Summer	Zdeněk Růžička	Gymnastics
13	1960	Winter	Ján Starší	Ice hockey
14	1960	Summer	Jiří Kormaník	Wrestling
15	1964	Winter	Josef Matouš	Ski jumping
16	1964	Summer	Karel Klečka	Artistic gymnastics
17	1968	Winter	Jiří Raška	Ski jumping
18	1968	Summer	Bohumil Golián	Volleyball
19	1972	Winter	Jiří Raška	Ski jumping
20	1972	Summer	Ludvík Daněk	Athletics
21	1976	Winter	Oldřich Machač	Ice hockey
22	1976	Summer	Ludvík Daněk	Athletics
23	1980	Winter	Bohuslav Ebermann	Ice hockey
24	1980	Summer	Vítězslav Mácha	Wrestling
25	1984	Winter	Jiří Králík	Ice hockey
26	1988	Winter	Jiří Parma	Ski jumping
27	1988	Summer	Imrich Bugár	Athletics
28	1992	Winter	Pavel Benc	Cross-country skiing
29	1992	Summer	Jozef Lohyňa	Wrestling

== See also ==
- Czechoslovakia at the Olympics
