= Czechoslovakia at the 1932 Winter Olympics =

- IOC code: TCH
- NOC: Czechoslovak Olympic Committee

in Lake Placid
- Competitors: 6 in 4 sports
- Flag bearer: Antonín Bartoň
- Medals: Gold 0 Silver 0 Bronze 0 Total 0

Winter Olympics appearances (overview)
- 1924; 1928; 1932; 1936; 1948; 1952; 1956; 1960; 1964; 1968; 1972; 1976; 1980; 1984; 1988; 1992

Other related appearances
- Czech Republic (1994–pres.); Slovakia (1994–pres.)

Czechoslovakia competed at the 1932 Winter Olympics in Lake Placid, United States.

== Cross-country skiing ==
Athlete	Event	Race	
Athlete	Event	Time	Rank
Antonín Bartoň	18 km	1:33:39	16
Antonín Bartoň	50 km	4:52:24	10
Ján Cífka	18 km	1:38:24	22
Ján Cífka	50 km	5:01:50	14
Josef Feistauer	18 km	1:37:55	20
Josef Feistauer	50 km	5:00:19	13
Vladimír Novák	18 km	1:32:59	14
Vladimír Novák	50 km	4:52:44	11

== Figure skating ==
Athlete(s)	Event	CF	FS	TO	Points	Rank
Walther Langer	Men's	9	11	69	1964.3	10

== Nordic combined ==
Athlete	Event	Cross-country			Ski jumping		Total	
Athlete	Event	Time	Rank	Points	Points	Rank	Points	Rank
Antonín Bartoň	Individual	1:33:39	208.50	6	188.6	19	397.1	6
Ján Cífka	Individual	1:38:24	186.0	11	181.2	23	367.2	11
Jaroslav Feistauer	Individual	1:37:55	189.0	9	176.6	24	361.6	13
František Šimůnek	Individual	1:39:58	178.5	14	196.8	15	375.3	8

== Ski jumping ==
Athlete	Event	Jump 1		Jump 2		Total	
Athlete	Event	Distance	Rank	Distance	Rank	Points	Rank
Antonín Bartoň	Normal hill	88.0	23	98.1	15	186.1	21
Ján Cífka	Normal hill	84.0	25	88.5	25	172.5	24
Jaroslav Feistauer	Normal hill	81.0	27	82.0	28	163.0	26
František Šimůnek	Normal hill	87.4	24	95.8	18	183.2	23
