= Martin P. Vangsli =

Norwegian cross-country skier (1903–1976)

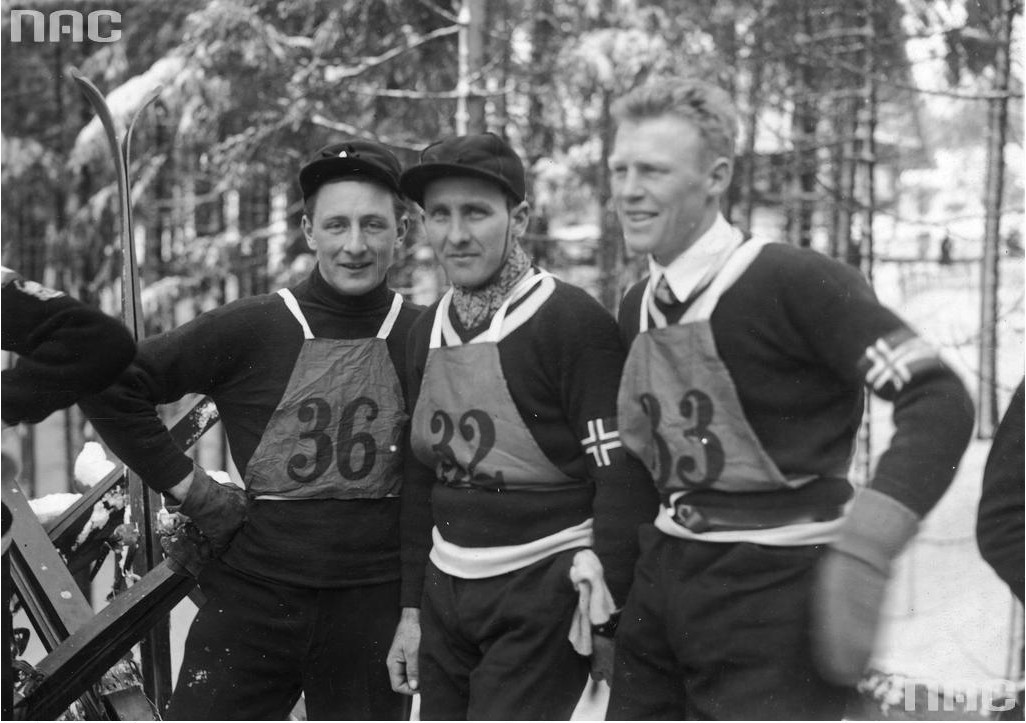
- Vangsli (middle), with Sven Erikson and Gunnar Andersen in 1931.

Medal record

Men's cross-country skiing

Representing Norway

World Championships
Silver medal – second place	1931 Oberhof	50 km

Martin P. Vangsli (February 1, 1903 – June 5, 1976) was a Norwegian cross-country skier who was awarded the Holmenkollen medal in 1937 (Shared with Olaf Hoffsbakken and Birger Ruud). At the 1931 FIS Nordic World Ski Championships, Vangsli earned a silver in the 50 km.

== Cross-country skiing results ==
All results are sourced from the International Ski Federation (FIS).

=== World Championships ===
- 1 medal – (1 silver)

Year	Age	17 km	18 km	50 km	4 × 10 km relay
1930	27	25	—N/a	5	—N/a
1931	28	—N/a	6	Silver	—N/a
1934	31	—N/a	DNF	—	—
