= FIS Nordic World Ski Championships 1933 =

1933 sports event in Innsbruck, Austria

- Host city: Innsbruck
- Country: Austria
- Events: 5
- Opening: 8 February 1933
- Closing: 12 February 1933

The FIS Nordic World Ski Championships 1933 took place on 8–12 February 1933 in Innsbruck, Austria. This event would also debut the 4 x 10 km relay.

== Men's cross country ==
=== 18 km ===
10 February 1933

Medal	Athlete	Time
Gold	Nils-Joel Englund (SWE)	1:02:19
Silver	Hjalmar Bergström (SWE)	1:02:40
Bronze	Väinö Liikkanen (FIN)	1:02:47

=== 50 km ===
12 February 1933

Medal	Athlete	Time
Gold	Veli Saarinen (FIN)	4:13:49
Silver	Sven Utterström (SWE)	4:14:31
Bronze	Hjalmar Bergström (SWE)	4:17:06

=== 4 × 10 km relay ===
12 February 1933

Medal	Team	Time
Gold	Sweden (Per-Erik Hedlund, Sven Utterström, Nils-Joel Englund, Hjalmar Bergström)	2:49:00
Silver	Czechoslovakia (František Šimůnek, Vladimír Novák, Antonín Bartoň, Cyril Musil)	2:57:34
Bronze	Austria (Hugo Gstrein, Hermann Gadner, Balthasar Niederkofler, Harald Paumgarten)	2:57:51

== Men's Nordic combined ==
=== Individual ===
8 February 1933

Medal	Athlete	Points
Gold	Sven Eriksson (SWE)	454.1
Silver	Antonín Bartoň (TCH)	422.0
Bronze	Harald Bosio (AUT)	415.0

Harald Bosio was Austria's first medalist at the FIS Nordic World Ski Championships.

== Men's ski jumping ==
=== Individual large hill ===
8 February 1933

Medal	Athlete	Points
Gold	Marcel Reymond (SUI)	224.0
Silver	Rudolf Burkert (TCH)	213.8
Bronze	Sven Eriksson (SWE)	210.9

== Medal table ==
Rank	Nation	Gold	Silver	Bronze	Total
1	Sweden (SWE)	3	2	2	7
2	Finland (FIN)	1	0	1	2
3	Switzerland (SUI)	1	0	0	1
4	Czechoslovakia (TCH)	0	3	0	3
5	Austria (AUT)	0	0	2	2
Totals (5 entries)		5	5	5	15
