= Olle Zetterstrom =

American cross-country skier (1901–1968)

Personal information
- Nationality: American
- Born: April 23, 1901 Östersund, Sweden
- Died: June 28, 1968 (aged 67) Canaan, Connecticut, United States

Sport
- Sport: Cross-country skiing

Olle Zetterstrom (April 23, 1901 – June 28, 1968) was an American cross-country skier. He competed in the men's 18 kilometre event at the 1932 Winter Olympics.
