= Balthasar Niederkofler =

Austrian cross-country skier

Medal record

Men's cross-country skiing

World Championships
Bronze medal – third place	1933 Innsbruck	4 x 10 km

Balthasar Niederkofler (10 November 1906 – 11 April 1989) was an Austrian cross-country skier who competed in the 1930s. He won a bronze medal in the 4 x 10 km at the 1933 FIS Nordic World Ski Championships in Innsbruck.
