= FIS Nordic World Ski Championships 1931 =

International Nordic skiing competition

- Host city: Oberhof
- Country: Germany
- Events: 4
- Opening: 13 February 1931
- Closing: 15 February 1931

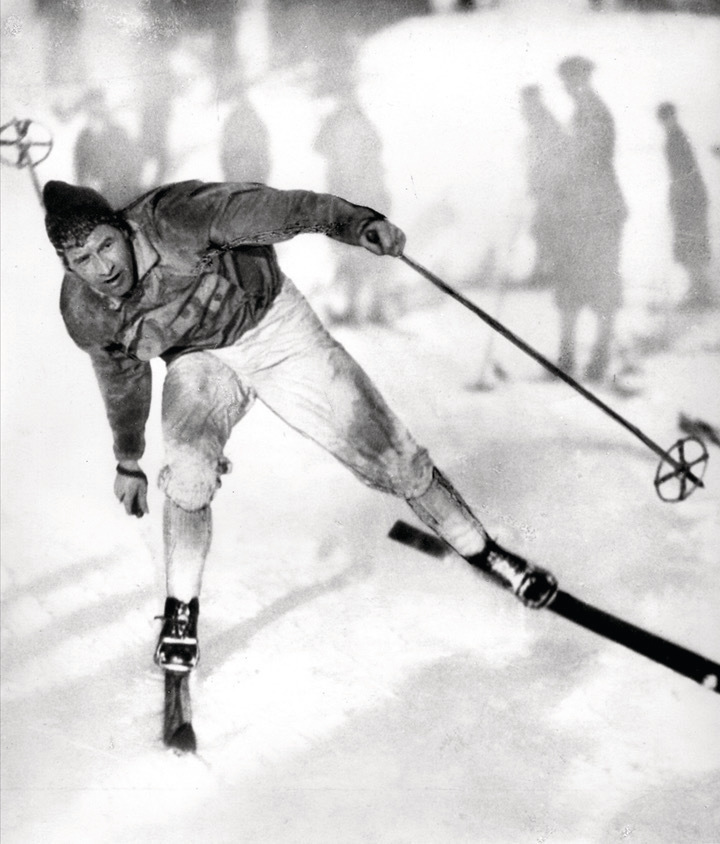
Johan Grøttumsbråten at the FIS Nordic World Ski Championships 1931 before winning the 18 km cross-country skiing

The FIS Nordic World Ski Championships 1931 took place on February 13–15, 1931 in Oberhof.

== Men's cross country ==
=== 18 km ===
February 13, 1931

Medal	Athlete	Time
Gold	Johan Grøttumsbråten (NOR)	1:23:43
Silver	Kristian Hovde (NOR)	1:24:09
Bronze	Nils Svärd (SWE)	1:25:27

=== 50 km ===
February 15, 1931

Medal	Athlete	Time
Gold	Ole Stenen (NOR)	3:52:09
Silver	Martin Peder Vangli (NOR)	3:52:35
Bronze	Karl Lindberg (SWE)	3:55:44

== Men's Nordic combined ==
=== Individual ===
February 13, 1931

Medal	Athlete	Points
Gold	Johan Grøttumsbråten (NOR)	439.00
Silver	Sverre Kolterud (NOR)	419.00
Bronze	Arne Rustadstuen (NOR)	418.00

== Men's ski jumping ==
=== Individual large hill ===
February 13, 1931

Medal	Athlete	Points
Gold	Birger Ruud (NOR)	236.0
Silver	Fritz Kaufmann (SUI)	228.8
Bronze	Sven Eriksson (SWE)	227.3

== Medal table ==
Rank	Nation	Gold	Silver	Bronze	Total
1	Norway (NOR)	4	3	1	8
2	Switzerland (SUI)	0	1	0	1
3	Sweden (SWE)	0	0	3	3
Totals (3 entries)		4	4	4	12
