= Arnold Stone =

Canadian ski jumper

Personal information
- Nationality: Canadian
- Born: 11 March 1910; Revelstoke, British Columbia, Canada
- Died: 24 June 2004 (aged 94); Edmonton, Alberta, Canada

Sport
- Sport: Ski jumping

Arnold Stone (11 March 1910 – 24 June 2004) was a Canadian ski jumper. He competed in the individual event at the 1932 Winter Olympics.
