= Robert Reid (cross-country skier) =

American cross-country skier (1898–1990)

Personal information
- Born: May 27, 1898 Berlin, New Hampshire, United States
- Died: April 11, 1990 (aged 91)

Sport
- Sport: Cross-country skiing

Robert Reid (May 27, 1898 – April 11, 1990) was an American cross-country skier. He competed in the men's 50 kilometre event at the 1932 Winter Olympics.
