= Karl Lindberg =

Swedish cross-country skier

Medal record

Men's cross-country skiing

Representing Sweden

World Championships
Bronze medal – third place	1931 Oberhof	50 km

Karl Lindberg (May 14, 1906 – May 23, 1988) was a Swedish cross-country skier who competed in the early 1930s. At the 1931 FIS Nordic World Ski Championships, Lindberg earned a bronze in the 50 km.

== Cross-country skiing results ==
All results are sourced from the International Ski Federation (FIS).

=== World Championships ===
- 1 medal – (1 bronze)

Year	Age	18 km	50 km
1931	24	4	Bronze
