= John Steele (ski jumper) =

American ski jumper

Personal information
- Born: April 9, 1909 Minneapolis, Minnesota, United States
- Died: June 7, 1996 (aged 87) Grand Junction, Colorado, United States

Sport
- Sport: Ski jumping

John Steele (April 9, 1909 – June 7, 1996) was an American ski jumper.

Steele was born in Minneapolis, Minnesota, and moved with his family to Steamboat Springs, Colorado, in 1918. When he was 12 he ski jumped at the local Winter Carnival, and continued to jump at the carnival for 20 years. While employed shovelling snow off a bank roof, he built a ski jump on the bank, which he used until the sheriff made him stop because of fears he would jump in front of passing traffic. In 1924 he broke the world record in ski jumping for boys 14 and under. He went on to attend the University of Denver, where he founded the Pioneer Ski Club.

Steele was selected as a member of the U.S. team for the 1932 Winter Olympics at Lake Placid, New York, and competed in the ski jumping individual event there.
