= Jacques Landry (ski jumper) =

Canadian ski jumper

Personal information
- Born: 27 September 1911; Ottawa, Ontario, Canada
- Died: 24 November 1976 (aged 65); Solano County, California, United States

Sport
- Sport: Ski jumping

Jacques Landry (27 September 1911 – 24 November 1976) was a Canadian ski jumper. He competed in the individual event at the 1932 Winter Olympics.
