= Arthur Pangman =

Canadian cross-country skier

Arthur Harold "Harry" Pangman (June 1, 1905 in Montreal – June 25, 1996 in Sainte-Anne-de-Bellevue) was a Canadian cross-country skier who competed in the 1932 Winter Olympics.

In 1932 he finished 35th in the shorter cross-country skiing competition.
