= Leif Skagnæs =

Norwegian Nordic combined skier (1903–1955)

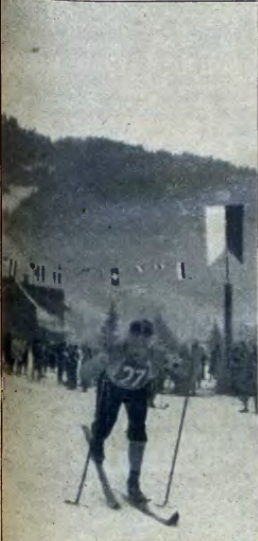

Medal record

Men's Nordic combined

World Championships
Silver medal – second place	1930 Oslo	Individual

Leif Skagnæs (20 November 1903 – 1 July 1955) was a Norwegian Nordic combined skier who competed in early 1930s. He won an individual silver at the 1930 FIS Nordic World Ski Championships in Oslo.

He participated in the demonstration event, military patrol (precursor to biathlon), in the 1928 Winter Olympics.
