= Adiel Paananen =

Finnish cross-country skier (1897–1968)

Medal record

Men's cross-country skiing

Representing Finland

World Championships
Bronze medal – third place	1930 Oslo	50 km

Adiel Arthur Paananen (January 3, 1897 – July 25, 1968) was a Finnish cross-country skier in the late 1920s and early 1930s.

He was born and died in the town of Saarijärvi, located in the Central Finland region.

At the 1928 Winter Olympics, he competed in the 50 km event but did not finish. Paananen won a bronze medal at the 1930 FIS Nordic World Ski Championships in the 50 km event.

== Cross-country skiing results ==
All results are sourced from the International Ski Federation (FIS).

=== Olympic Games ===
Year	Age	18 km	50 km
1928	31	—	DNF

=== World Championships ===
- 1 medal – (1 bronze)

Year	Age	17 km	50 km
1930	33	—	Bronze
