= Yoichi Takata =

Japanese ski jumper

Personal information
- Nationality: Japanese
- Born: 1908 Toyohara, Japan

Sport
- Sport: Ski jumping

Yoichi Takata (born 1908, date of death unknown) was a Japanese ski jumper. He competed in the individual event at the 1932 Winter Olympics.
