= Knut Lunde =

Norwegian Nordic combined skier

Medal record

Men's Nordic combined

World Championships
Bronze medal – third place	1930 Oslo	Individual

Knut Lunde (22 February 1905 - 31 May 1960) was a Norwegian Nordic combined skier who competed in early 1930s. He won an individual bronze at the 1930 FIS Nordic World Ski Championships in Oslo.
