= Gunnar Andersen (ski jumper) =

Norwegian ski jumper (1909–1988)

Gunnar Andersen (26 February 1909 – 26 June 1988) was a Norwegian ski jumper. He won a gold medal in the individual large hill at the 1930 FIS Nordic World Ski Championships in Oslo.
