= Hubert Douglas =

Canadian cross-country skier

Personal information
- Born: 15 May 1907; Ottawa, Ontario, Canada
- Died: 1977 (aged 69–70); Ottawa, Ontario, Canada

Sport
- Sport: Cross-country skiing

Hubert Douglas (15 May 1907 – 1977) was a Canadian cross-country skier. He competed in the men's 50 kilometre event at the 1932 Winter Olympics.
