= Kaare Engstad =

Canadian cross-country skier

Kaare Engstad (July 17, 1906 – January 10, 1981) was a Canadian cross-country skier who competed in the 1932 Winter Olympics. In 1932 he finished 16th in the 50 kilometres competition.
