= John Taylor (cross-country skier) =

Canadian cross-country skier

Personal information
- Born: 12 January 1908; Toronto, Ontario, Canada
- Died: 4 November 1989 (aged 81)

Sport
- Sport: Cross-country skiing

John Taylor (12 January 1908 – 4 November 1989) was a Canadian cross-country skier. He competed in the men's 18 kilometre event at the 1932 Winter Olympics.
