= Valmari Toikka =

Finnish cross-country skier

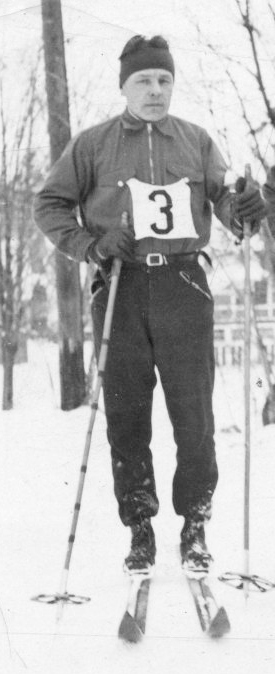
Valmari Toikka 1932

Volmari "Valmari" Toikka (December 27, 1902 in Kannusjärvi, Kymenlaakso – December 21, 1990) was a Finnish cross-country skier who competed in the 1932 Winter Olympics.

He was born in Kannusjärvi, Kymenlaakso and died in Vehkalahti.

In 1932 he finished seventh in the 18 km event.

== Cross-country skiing results ==
=== Olympic Games ===
Year	Age	18 km	50 km
1932	29	7	—
