= Bormio =

- Comune
- Comune di Bormio
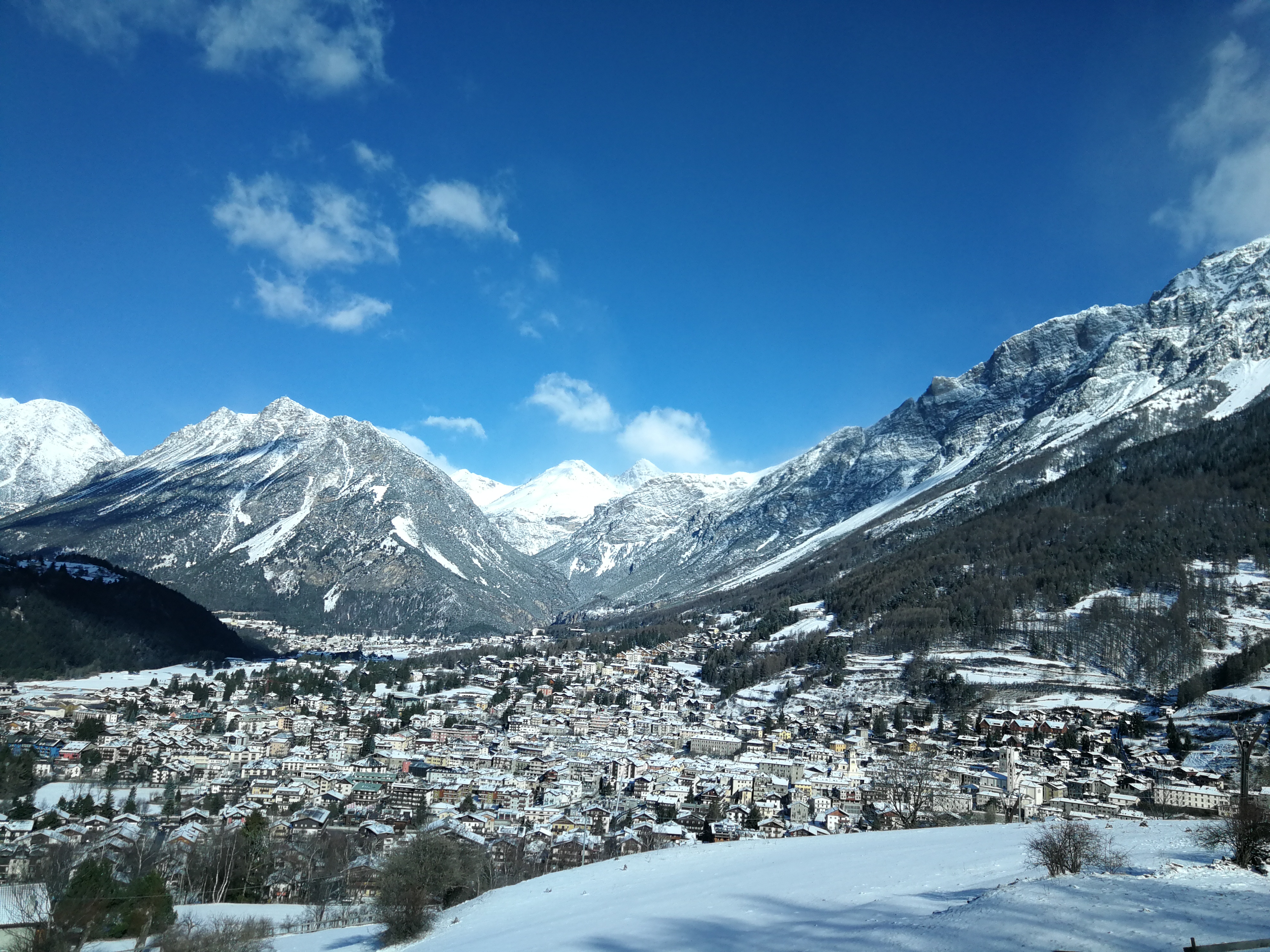
- Panoramic view

- Flag

- Location within Italy Location within Lombardy
- Coordinates: 46°28′N 10°22′E
- Country: Italy
- Region: Lombardy
- Province: Sondrio (SO)
- Frazioni: none

Government
  - Mayor: Silvia Cavazzi

Area
  - Total: 41 km^{2} (16 sq mi)
- Elevation: 1,225 m (4,019 ft)

Population (2018-01-01)
  - Total: 4,088
  - Density: 100/km^{2} (260/sq mi)
- Demonym: Bormini
- Time zone: UTC+1 (CET)
  - Summer (DST): UTC+2 (CEST)
- Postal code: 23032
- Dialing code: 0342
- Patron saint: Gervasius and Protasius
- Saint day: 19 June
- Website: Official website

Bormio (Lombard: Bormi, Romansh: Buorm, German: Worms im Veltlintal) is a town and comune with a population of about 4,100 located in the Province of Sondrio, Lombardy region of the Alps in northern Italy.

The centre of the upper Valtellina valley, it is a popular winter sports resort. It was the site of the Alpine World Ski Championships in 1985 and 2005, and annually hosts the Alpine Ski World Cup. In addition to modern skiing facilities, the town is noted for the presence of several hot springs that have been tapped to provide water to three thermal baths.

== Geography ==
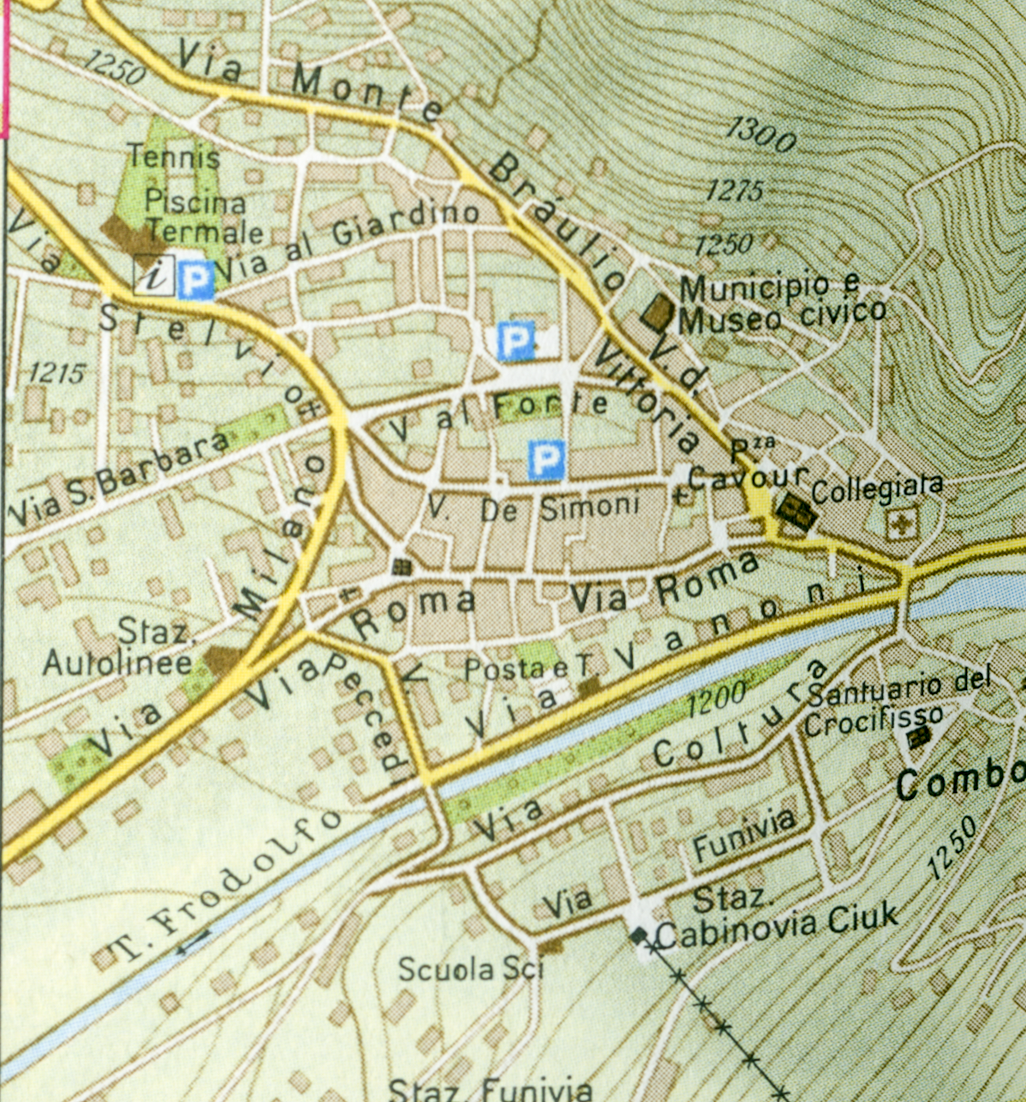
Map of city centre

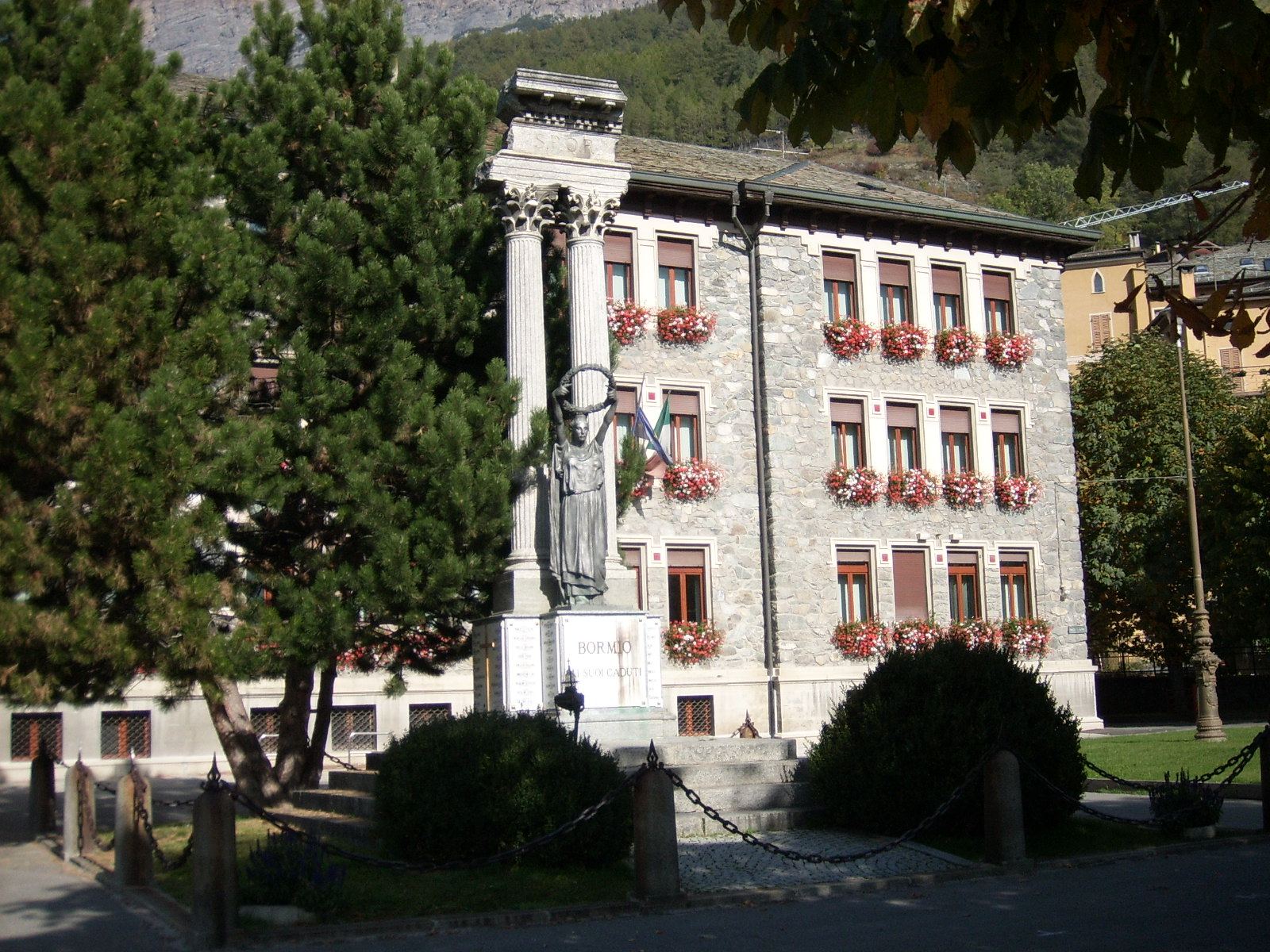
Primary School, with World War I memorial by Egidio Gunella di Viggiù (1864–1934)

Bormio lies in the northeast of the Lombardy region at the top of the Valtellina, a broad glacial valley formed by the Adda River that flows down into Lake Como. It is linked to other valleys via four passes:

- South Tyrol via the Stelvio Pass
- Val Müstair via the Umbrail Pass
- Livigno via the Foscagno Pass
- Ponte di Legno via the Gavia Pass

== History ==
The church of San Vitale, built as early as the 12th century in the Romanesque style

Due to its thermal baths at Bagni Vecchi, Bagni Nuovi and Terme di Bormio, Bormio has long been a tourist attraction. Members of the Roman aristocracy regularly travelled to Bormio to enjoy warm baths in the mountainous scenery. Most of these thermal baths are still in use today.

The town is centred on the historic Piazza Cavour and Via Roma, a historic main trading point on the route from Venice to Switzerland. Bormio retains its unique medieval town centre, attracting many tourists, mainly Italian, from Milan and other cities. It hosted alpine skiing in the 2026 Winter Olympics.

== Alpine skiing ==
The village hosted the FIS Alpine World Ski Championships twice, in 1985 and 2005, both cohosted with Santa Caterina di Valfurva. There are fifty kilometres (30 miles) of marked ski runs, the longest run of which is 6 km (4 mi), served by fifteen lifts and several ski schools.

Bormio is a regular stop on the World Cup circuit, usually with a men's downhill in late December. The Pista Stelvio, named after Stelvio Pass, is one of the most challenging downhill courses in the world; it is second-longest on the World Cup circuit, behind only the Lauberhorn in Wengen, Switzerland.

For the World Cup race in December 2017, the Stelvio started at an elevation of 2,255 m (7,398 ft), with a vertical drop of 1,010 m (3,314 ft) and course length of 3.27 km (2.03 mi). The winning time of Italian Dominik Paris was just under two minutes, yielding an average speed of 100.66 km/h (62.5 mph) and a vertical descent rate of over 8.6 metres (28 ft) per second.

== Main sights ==
- Giardino Botanico Alpino "Rezia" – botanical garden
- Kuerc Square – town center
- Olympic Ski stadium
- Pagoda
- Dai Sanei museum
- Braulio headquater

== Notable people ==
- Fausto Bormetti, cross-country skier.
- Marco De Gasperi, 6-times World Champion runner
- Stefano Donagrandi, ice speed skater
- Francesca Martinelli, ski mountaineer
- Oreste Peccedi, Head Coach of the Italian National Ski Team from 1970 to 1976
- Aldo Pedrana, Olympic skier
- Roberta Pedranzini, ski mountaineer
- Erminio Sertorelli, Olympic skier
- Giacinto Sertorelli, Olympic skier
- Stefano Sertorelli, Olympic skier
- Mara Urbani, Short track speed skater

== Twin cities and towns ==
Bormio is twinned with:

- Huez, France, since 2005.
- Bansko, Bulgaria, since 2023.
- Bellpuig, Spain, since 2002.
