= John Currie (cross-country skier) =

Canadian cross-country skier

Personal information
- Born: 2 January 1910 Ottawa, Ontario, Canada
- Died: 20 December 1989 (aged 79)

Sport
- Sport: Cross-country skiing

John Currie (2 January 1910 – 20 December 1989) was a Canadian cross-country skier. He competed in the men's 18 kilometre event at the 1932 Winter Olympics.
