= Leslie Gagne =

Canadian ski jumper

Personal information
- Born: 27 December 1906; Montreal, Quebec, Canada
- Died: 1 June 1962 (aged 55)

Sport
- Sport: Ski jumping

Leslie Gagne (27 December 1906 – 1 June 1962) was a Canadian ski jumper. He competed in the individual event at the 1932 Winter Olympics.
