= Peder Falstad =

American ski jumper

Personal information
- Nationality: American
- Born: February 7, 1894 Snåsa Municipality, Norway
- Died: February 11, 1965 (aged 71) Orange, California, United States

Sport
- Sport: Ski jumping

Peder Falstad (February 7, 1894 – February 11, 1965) was an American ski jumper. He competed in the individual event at the 1932 Winter Olympics.
