= Tauno Lappalainen =

Finnish cross-country skier

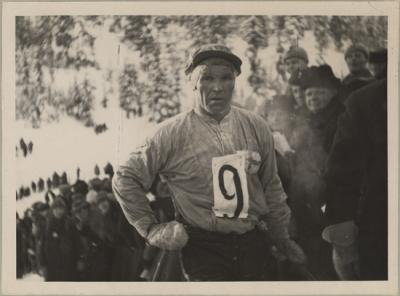

Medal record

Men's cross-country skiing

Representing Finland

World Championships
Silver medal – second place	1926 Lahti	30 km
Silver medal – second place	1926 Lahti	50 km
Bronze medal – third place	1930 Oslo	17 km

Tauno Mikko Lappalainen (10 March 1898 – 25 January 1973) was a Finnish cross-country skier who competed in the late 1920s and early 1930s.

He was born and died in Liperi.

Lappalainen won three medals at the FIS Nordic World Ski Championships with two silvers in 1926 (30 km, 50 km) and one bronze in 1930 (17 km).

At the 1928 Winter Olympics he finished sixth in the 50 km event. Four years later he finished seventh in the 50 km event at the 1932 Winter Olympics.

== Cross-country skiing results ==
All results are sourced from the International Ski Federation (FIS).

=== Olympic Games ===
Year	Age	18 km	50 km
1928	29	—	6
1932	33	—	7

=== World Championships ===
- 3 medals – (2 silver, 1 bronze)

Year	Age	17 km	18 km	30 km	50 km
1926	27	—N/a	—N/a	Silver	Silver
1930	31	Bronze	—N/a	—N/a	—
