= Cyril Musil =

Medal record

Men's cross-country skiing

World Championships
Silver medal – second place	1933 Innsbruck	4 x 10 km

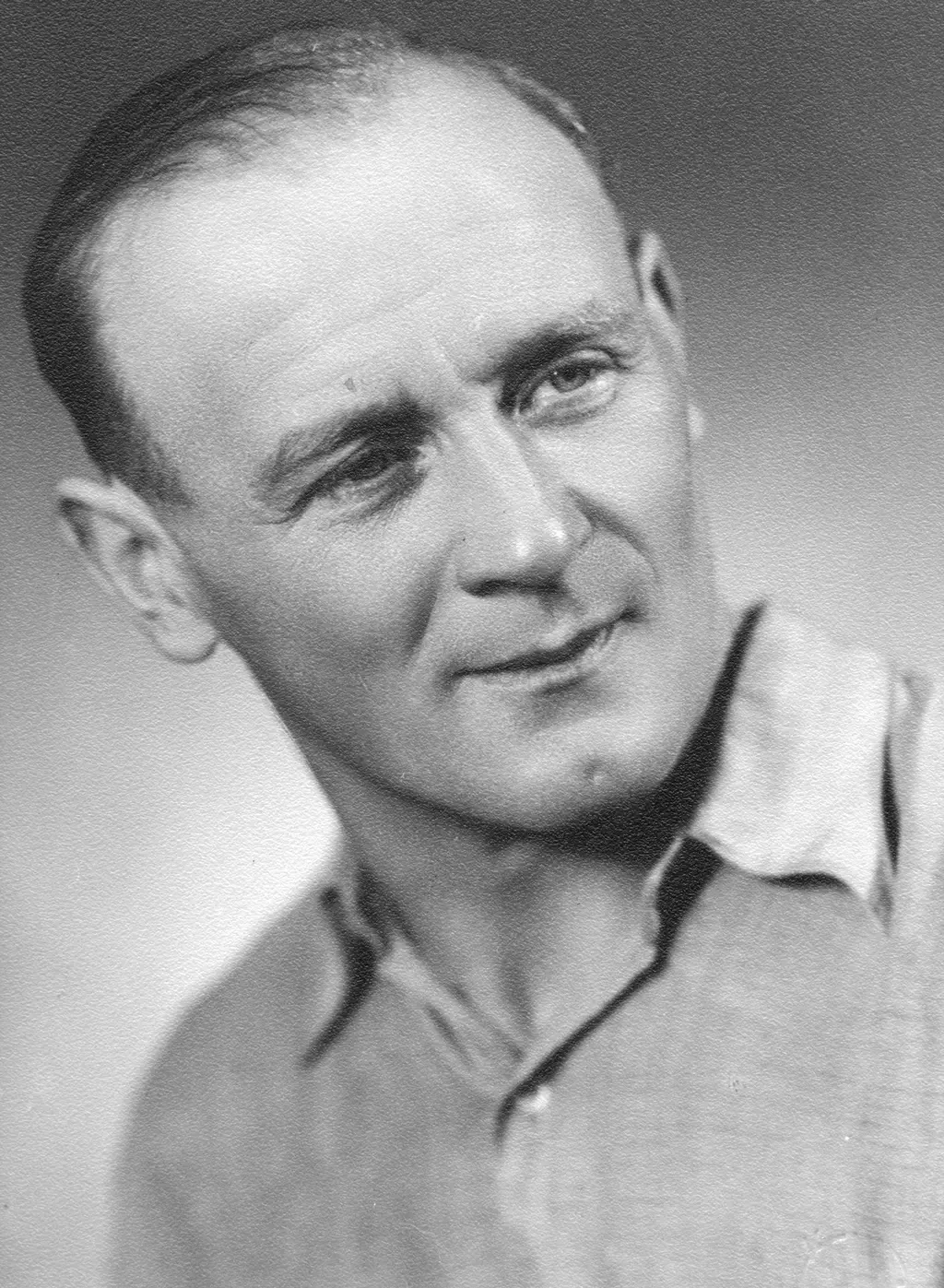
Cyril Musil

Cyril Musil (26 November 1907 – 17 April 1977) was a Czech anti-Nazi resistance fighter and cross-country skier. He competed for Czechoslovakia in the 1930s.

== Life and career ==
Musicl was born on 26 November 1907 in Studnice, Moravia, Austria-Hungary (now part of Nové Město na Moravě, Czech Republic). He won a silver medal in the 4 x 10 km at the 1933 FIS Nordic World Ski Championships in Innsbruck. At the 1936 Winter Olympics in Garmisch-Partenkirchen, he finished ninth in the 50 km event and 14th in the 18 km competition. As a member of the Czechoslovak team, he finished fifth in the 4x10 km relay event.

Musil and his wife were involved in the resistance during World War II, using their guesthouse to hide antifascist fighters. After the war, in 1948, he refused to cooperate with the StB. In 1949, he was arrested and tortured before being sentenced to twenty years in prison on charges of espionage and illegal gun ownership. He escaped prison in 1950 and fled to Canada. He ran a boarding house and ski equipment shop in Ontario until his death.

Musil died in Collingwood, Ontario, on 17 April 1977.
