= Marcel Reymond =

Swiss ski jumper (1911–2002)

Medal record

Men's ski jumping

Representing Switzerland

World Championships
Gold medal – first place	1933 Innsbruck	Individual large hill

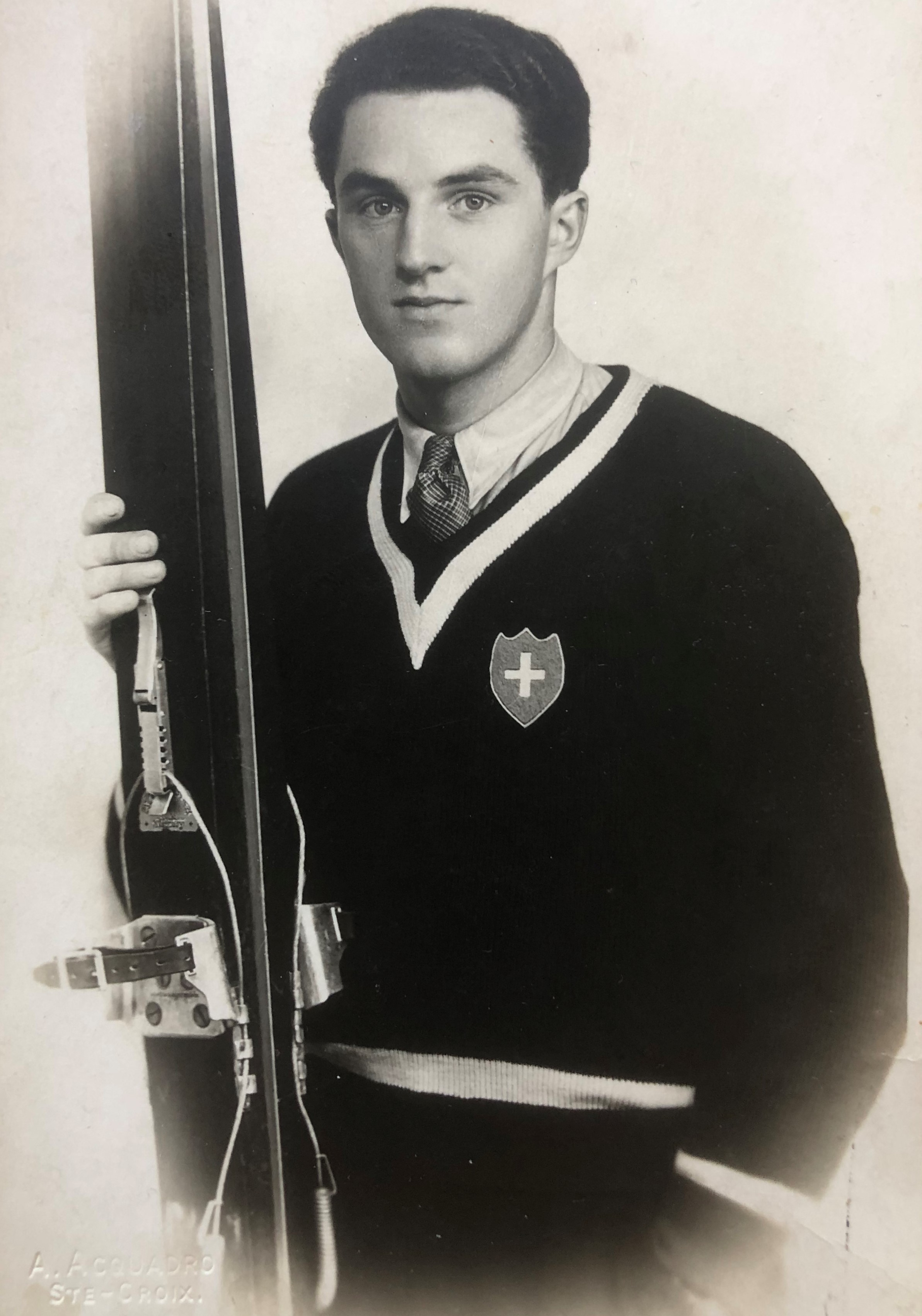
Marcel Reymond in 1935

Marcel Alfred Reymond (or Raymond, 7 July 1911 – 4 October 2002) was a Swiss ski jumper who competed in the early 1930s. He won a gold medal in the individual large hill at the 1933 FIS Nordic World Ski Championships in Innsbruck. Reymond died on 4 October 2002, at the age of 91.
