= Kinzo Taniguchi =

Japanese cross-country skier

Personal information
- Nationality: Japanese
- Born: 1910 Karafuto, Empire of Japan

Sport
- Sport: Cross-country skiing

Kinzo Taniguchi (born 1910, date of death unknown) was a Japanese cross-country skier. He competed in the men's 50 kilometre event at the 1932 Winter Olympics.
