= Erik Rylander =

Swedish ski jumper

Personal information
- Nationality: Swedish
- Born: 3 September 1905; Falun, Sweden
- Died: 9 September 1976 (aged 71); Falun, Sweden

Sport
- Sport: Ski jumping

Erik Rylander (3 September 1905 – 9 September 1976) was a Swedish ski jumper. He competed in the individual event at the 1932 Winter Olympics.
