= Hjalmar Bergström (skier) =

Swedish cross-country skier

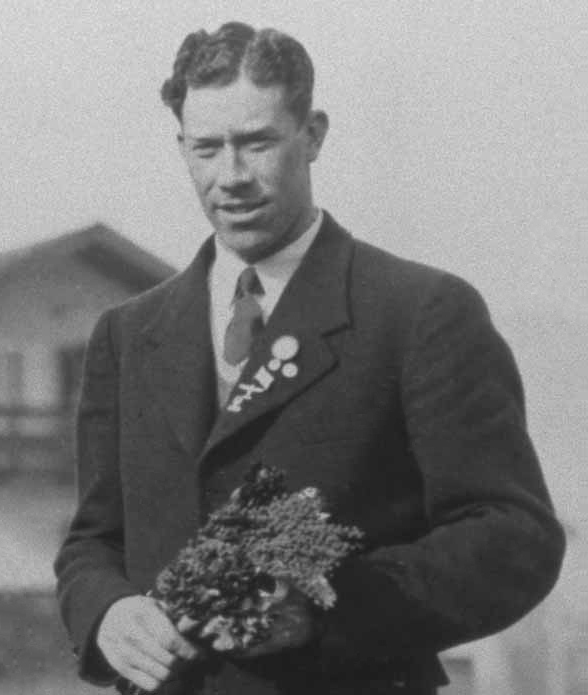
- Bergström at the 1936 Olympics

Personal information
- Full name: Hjalmar Karl Bergström
- Born: 19 January 1907 Lövön, Kungälv, Sweden
- Died: 31 March 2000 (aged 93) Umeå, Sweden

Sport
- Sport: Cross-country skiing
- Club: Sandviks IK
Medal record
Men's cross-country skiing
Representing Sweden
World Championships
Gold medal – first place	1933 Innsbruck	4 × 10 km relay
Silver medal – second place	1933 Innsbruck	18 km
Bronze medal – third place	1929 Zakopane	17 km
Bronze medal – third place	1933 Innsbruck	50 km

Hjalmar Karl Bergström (19 January 1907 – 31 March 2000) was a Swedish cross-country skier who won four medals at the world championships in 1929–1933. He competed at the 1936 Winter Olympics in the 50 km event and finished fourth, behind three fellow Swedes.

== Cross-country skiing results ==
All results are sourced from the International Ski Federation (FIS).

=== Olympic Games ===
Year	Age	18 km	50 km	4 × 10 km relay
1936	29	—	4	—

=== World Championships ===
- 4 medals – (1 gold, 1 silver, 2 bronze)

Year	Age	17 km	18 km	50 km	4 × 10 km relay
1929	22	Bronze	—N/a	6	—N/a
1933	26	—N/a	Silver	Bronze	Gold
