= Walter Ryan =

Canadian cross-country skier

Personal information
- Nationality: Canadian
- Born: 17 June 1904
- Died: 18 June 1989 (aged 85)

Sport
- Sport: Cross-country skiing

Walter Ryan (17 June 1904 – 18 June 1989) was a Canadian cross-country skier. He competed in the men's 50 kilometre event at the 1932 Winter Olympics.
