= Arne Rustadstuen =

Norwegian Nordic skier (1905–1978)

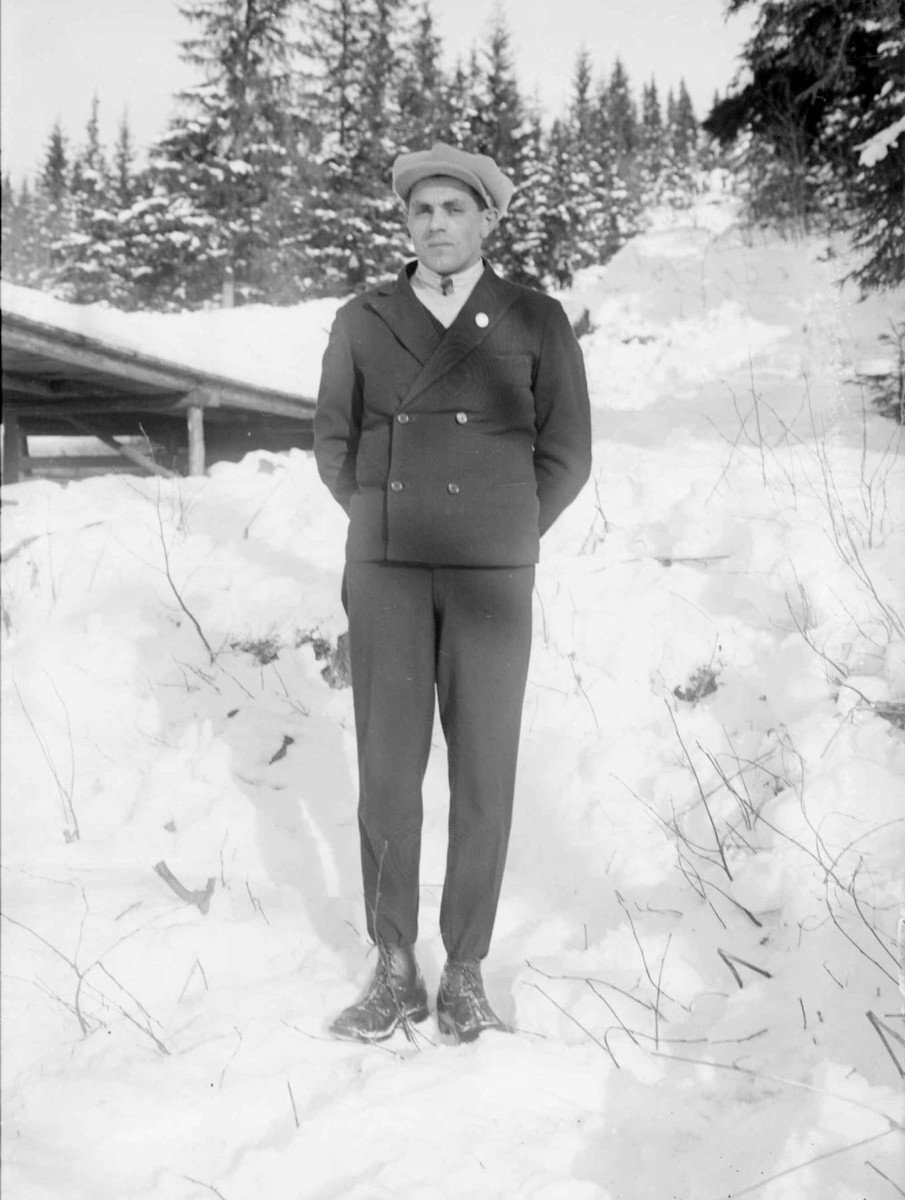

Medal record

Representing Norway

Men's cross-country skiing

Olympic Games
Bronze medal – third place	1932 Lake Placid	50 km

World Championships
Gold medal – first place	1930 Oslo	17 km
Silver medal – second place	1930 Oslo	50 km

Men's Nordic combined

World Championships
Bronze medal – third place	1931 Oberhof	Individual

Arne Rustadstuen (14 December 1905 – 25 April 1978) was a Norwegian Nordic skier who competed in Nordic combined and cross-country skiing in the 1930s. He won a bronze medal at the 1932 Winter Olympics in Lake Placid, New York, in the 50 km.

In addition, he won a complete set of medals at FIS Nordic World Ski Championships. In 1930, Rustadstuen won the 17 km cross-country event and earned a silver in the 50 km cross-country event while he earned a bronze in the Nordic combined in 1931. Rustadstuen won the men's 18 km at the Holmenkollen ski festival in 1934 and 1935. Because of his successes, Rustadstuen was awarded the Holmenkollen medal in 1935.

== Cross-country skiing results ==
All results are sourced from the International Ski Federation (FIS).

=== Olympic Games ===
- 1 medal – (1 bronze)

Year	Age	18 km	50 km	4 × 10 km relay
1932	26	5	Bronze	—N/a
1936	30	6	—	—

=== World Championships ===
- 2 medals – (1 gold, 1 silver)

Year	Age	17 km	18 km	50 km	4 × 10 km relay
1930	24	Gold	—N/a	Silver	—N/a
1931	25	—N/a	7	—	—N/a
1934	28	—N/a	20	DNF	—
