= Martti Lappalainen =

Finnish cross-country skier and biathlete

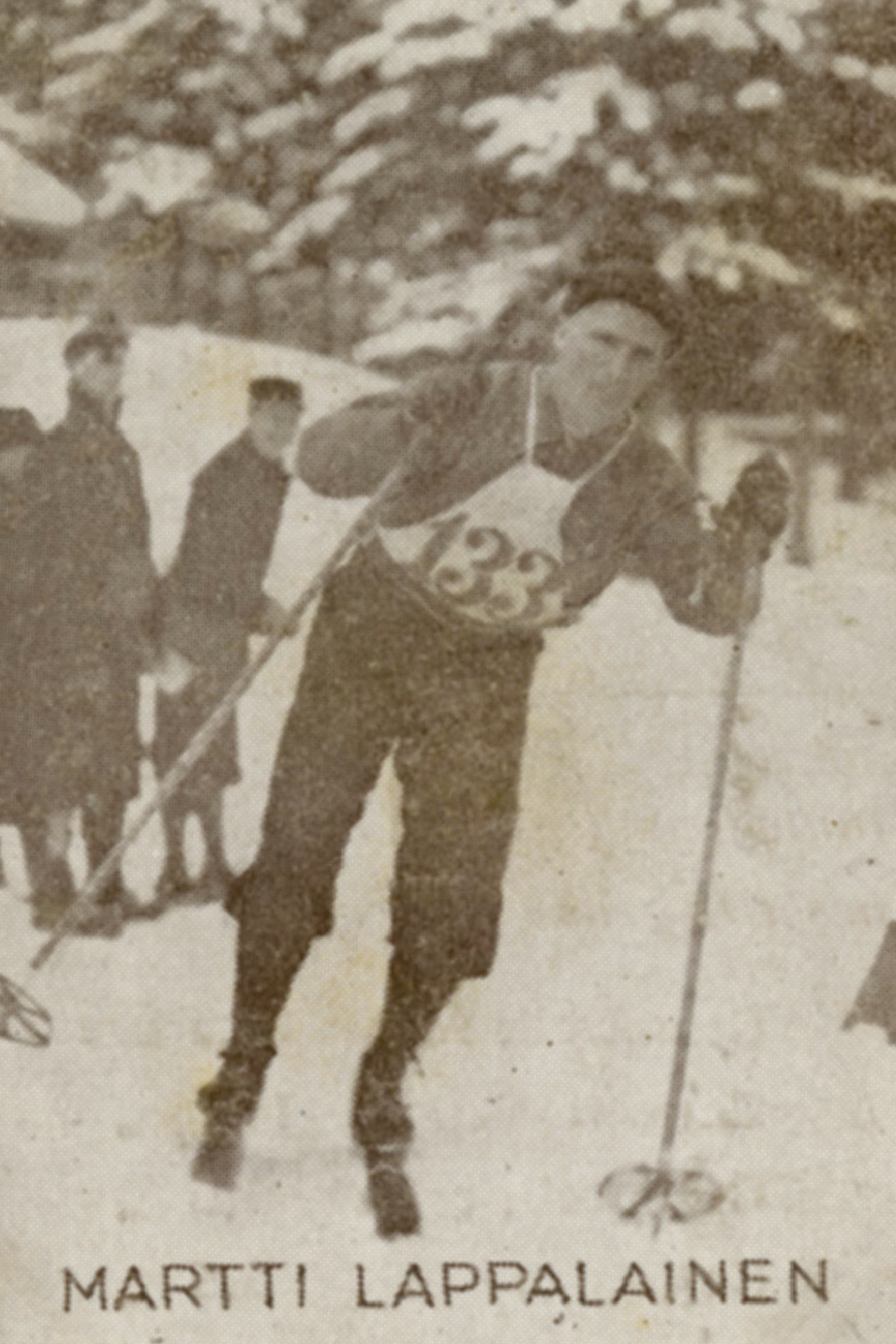

Personal information
- Full name: Martti Eemil Lappalainen
- Born: 11 April 1902 Liperi, Finland
- Died: 6 October 1941 (aged 39) Mäntysova, East Karelia

Sport
- Sport: Skiing
Medal record
Representing Finland
Military patrol
Olympic Games
Silver medal – second place	1924 Chamonix	Team
Men's cross-country skiing
World Championships
Gold medal – first place	1934 Sollefteå	4 × 10 km relay
Bronze medal – third place	1934 Sollefteå	18 km

Martti Eemil Lappalainen (11 April 1902 – 6 October 1941) was a Finnish cross-country skier and biathlete.

== Biography ==
He was born in Liperi and was killed in action in Mäntysova, East Karelia.

Lappalainen was a part of the Military patrol for Finland that took silver in the 1924 Winter Olympics.

He won the 50 km cross-country skiing event at Holmenkollen ski festival in 1928. As a result of this victory, he became the second non-Norwegian winner of any event run up to that point, behind fellow Finn Anton Collin, who won the 50 km event in 1922.

At the 1928 Winter Olympics he finished seventh in the 18 km event and ninth in the 50 km event.

Four years later he finished fourth in the 18 km event at the 1932 Winter Olympics in Lake Placid, New York. He also participated in the 50 km event but did not finish.

At the 1934 FIS Nordic World Ski Championships in Sollefteå he won a gold in the 4 × 10 km relay and a bronze in the 18 km.

He was killed in action during World War II.

== Cross-country skiing results ==
All results are sourced from the International Ski Federation (FIS).

=== Olympic Games ===
Year	Age	18 km	50 km
1928	25	7	9
1932	29	4	DNF

=== World Championships ===
- 2 medals – (1 gold, 1 bronze)

Year	Age	17 km	18 km	30 km	50 km	4 × 10 km relay
1926	23	—N/a	—N/a	6	—	—N/a
1930	27	6	—N/a	—N/a	4	—N/a
1934	31	—N/a	Bronze	—N/a	—	Gold
1938	35	—N/a	—	—N/a	39	—
