= Mitsutake Makita =

Japanese ski jumper

Personal information
- Nationality: Japanese
- Born: 1908 Aleksandrovsk, Russia

Sport
- Sport: Ski jumping

Mitsutake Makita (牧田光武, Makita Mitsutake; born 1908, date of death unknown) was a Japanese ski jumper. He competed in the individual event at the 1932 Winter Olympics.
