= Erling Andersen (cross-country skier) =

American cross-country skier (1905–1993)

Personal information
- Nationality: American
- Born: March 7, 1905 Oslo, Norway
- Died: September 11, 1993 (aged 88) Berlin, New Hampshire, United States

Sport
- Sport: Cross-country skiing

Erling Andersen (March 7, 1905 – September 11, 1993) was an American cross-country skier. He competed in the men's 18 kilometre event at the 1932 Winter Olympics.
