= Antonín Bartoň =

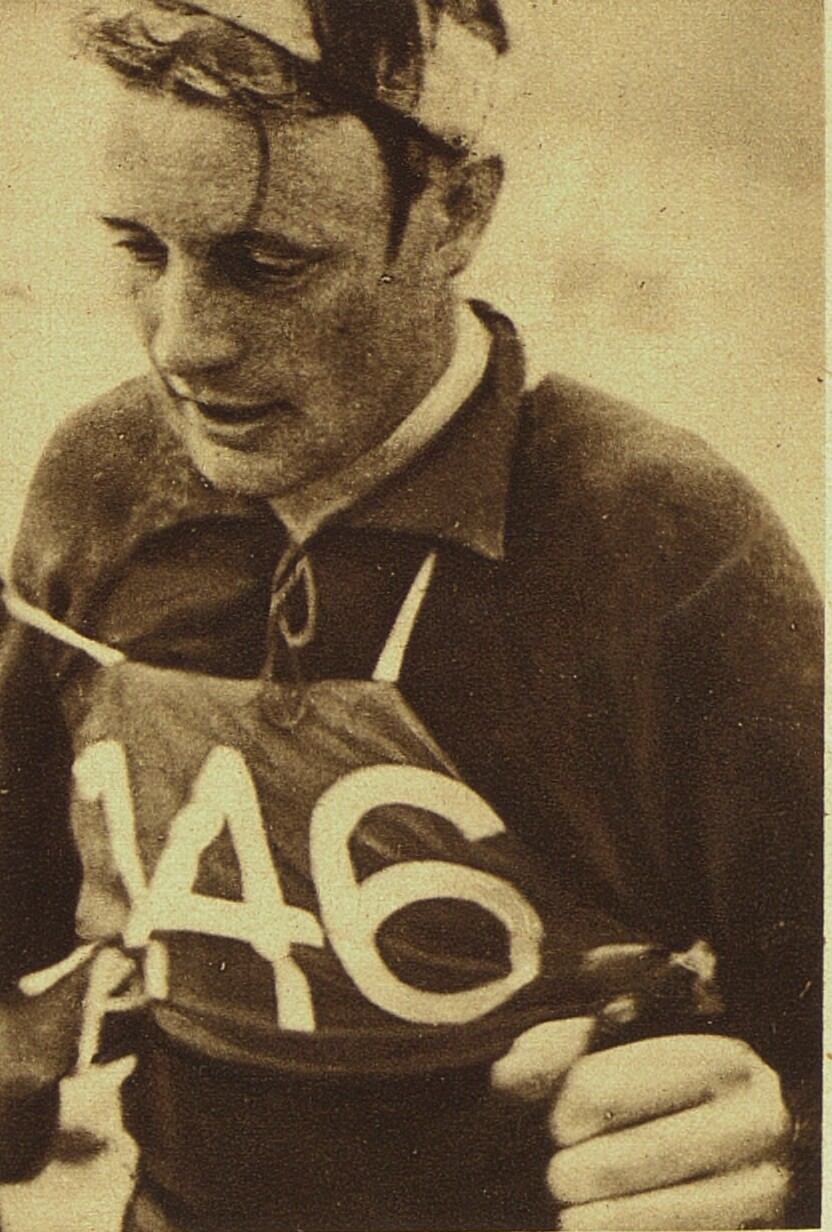
- Bartoň in 1933

Personal information
- Born: 12 December 1908 Vysoké nad Jizerou, Bohemia
- Died: 9 September 1982 (aged 73) Vysoké nad Jizerou, Czechoslovakia

Sport
- Country: Czechoslovakia
- Sport: Nordic skiing
Medal record
World Championships
Representing Czechoslovakia
Men's Nordic skiing
Silver medal – second place	1933 Innsbruck	Nordic combined
Men's Cross-country skiing
Silver medal – second place	1933 Innsbruck	4 x 10 km

Antonín Bartoň (12 December 1908 – 9 September 1982) was a Czech Nordic skier who competed for Czechoslovakia in the 1930s. He won two silver medals at the 1933 FIS Nordic World Ski Championships in Innsbruck.

== Biography ==
Born in Vysoké nad Jizerou, Bohemia, in 1908, Bartoň was the flag bearer for Czechoslovakia at the 1932 Winter Olympics in Lake Placid, New York. He finished 6th in the Nordic combined event. He finished also 16th in the shorter cross-country skiing event, 10th in the 50 kilometre event and 21st in the ski jumping competition.

1933 saw Bartoň compete at the 1933 FIS Nordic World Ski Championships in Innsbruck, where he won silver medals in two events: the combined race and the relay.

His skiing career finished before the 1936 Olympics due to a leg fracture sustained from a cycling accident. He subsequently went into the production of skis. Bartoň died in 1982 in Vysoké nad Jizerou.
