= Giacinto Sertorelli =

Italian alpine skier (1915–1938)

Medal record

Representing Italy

Men's Alpine skiing

World Championship
Silver medal – second place	1936 Innsbruck	Downhill
Silver medal – second place	1937 Chamonix	Downhill

Giacinto "Cinto" Sertorelli (1 January 1915 – 28 January 1938) was an Italian alpine skier who competed in the 1936 Winter Olympics.

== Biography ==
Born in Bormio, Lombardy, in 1936 he finished seventh in the alpine skiing combined event. He died in Garmisch-Partenkirchen during a race, when he fell and crashed into a tree. His brother Stefano was a member of the 1936 Olympic military patrol team and his brother Erminio was a successful cross-country skier.
