= Väinö Liikkanen =

Finnish cross-country skier

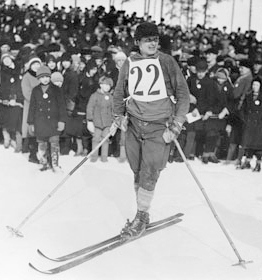

Personal information
- Born: 1 November 1903 Pihlaja, Virolahti, Finland
- Died: 15 October 1957 (aged 53) Kuusankoski, Finland
- Height: 179 cm (5 ft 10 in)
- Weight: 63–70 kg (139–154 lb)

Sport
- Sport: Cross-country skiing
- Club: Virolahden Sampo
Medal record
Men's cross-country skiing
Representing Finland
Olympic Games
Silver medal – second place	1932 Lake Placid	50 km
World Championships
Bronze medal – third place	1933 Innsbruck	18 km
Gold medal – first place	1935 Vysoké Tatry	4 × 10 km relay

Väinö Liikkanen (1 November 1903 – 15 October 1957) was a Finnish cross-country skier who competed in the 1932 Winter Olympics. He won a silver medal in the 50 km and finished ninth in the 18 km event. He also won two medals at the FIS Nordic World Ski Championships with a gold in the 4 × 10 km relay in 1935 and a bronze in the 18 km in 1933; in 1933 he also placed fourth over 50 km, despite winning the 50 km race at the national championships. He was a forester by profession.

== Cross-country skiing results ==
All results are sourced from the International Ski Federation (FIS).

=== Olympic Games ===
- 1 medal – (1 silver)

Year	Age	18 km	50 km
1932	28	—	Silver

=== World Championships ===
- 2 medals – (1 gold, 1 bronze)

Year	Age	17 km	18 km	50 km	4 × 10 km relay
1929	25	—	—N/a	4	—N/a
1930	26	—	—N/a	9	—N/a
1933	29	—N/a	Bronze	4	—
1935	31	—N/a	—	—	Gold
