= Vladimír Novák (skier) =

Medal record

Men's cross-country skiing

World Championships
| Silver medal – second place | 1933 Innsbruck | 4 x 10 km |

Vladimír Novák (2 February 1904 – 28 April 1986) was a Czech Nordic skier who competed for Czechoslovakia in the 1920s and in the 1930s. He won a silver medal in the 4 x 10 km at the 1933 FIS Nordic World Ski Championships in Innsbruck.

At the 1928 Winter Olympics he finished twelfth in the 18 kilometre cross-country skiing event.

Four years later Novak finished 11th in the 50 kilometre event and 14th in the shorter cross-country skiing event at the 1932 Winter Olympics in Lake Placid, New York.
