= Giovanni Delago =

Italian cross-country skier

Personal information
- Nationality: Italian
- Born: 31 January 1903; Selva di Val Gardena, Italy
- Died: 14 August 1987 (aged 84)

Sport
- Sport: Cross-country skiing

Giovanni Delago (31 January 1903 – 14 August 1987) was an Italian cross-country skier. He competed in the men's 50 kilometre event at the 1932 Winter Olympics.
