= Gino Soldà =

Italian cross-country skier

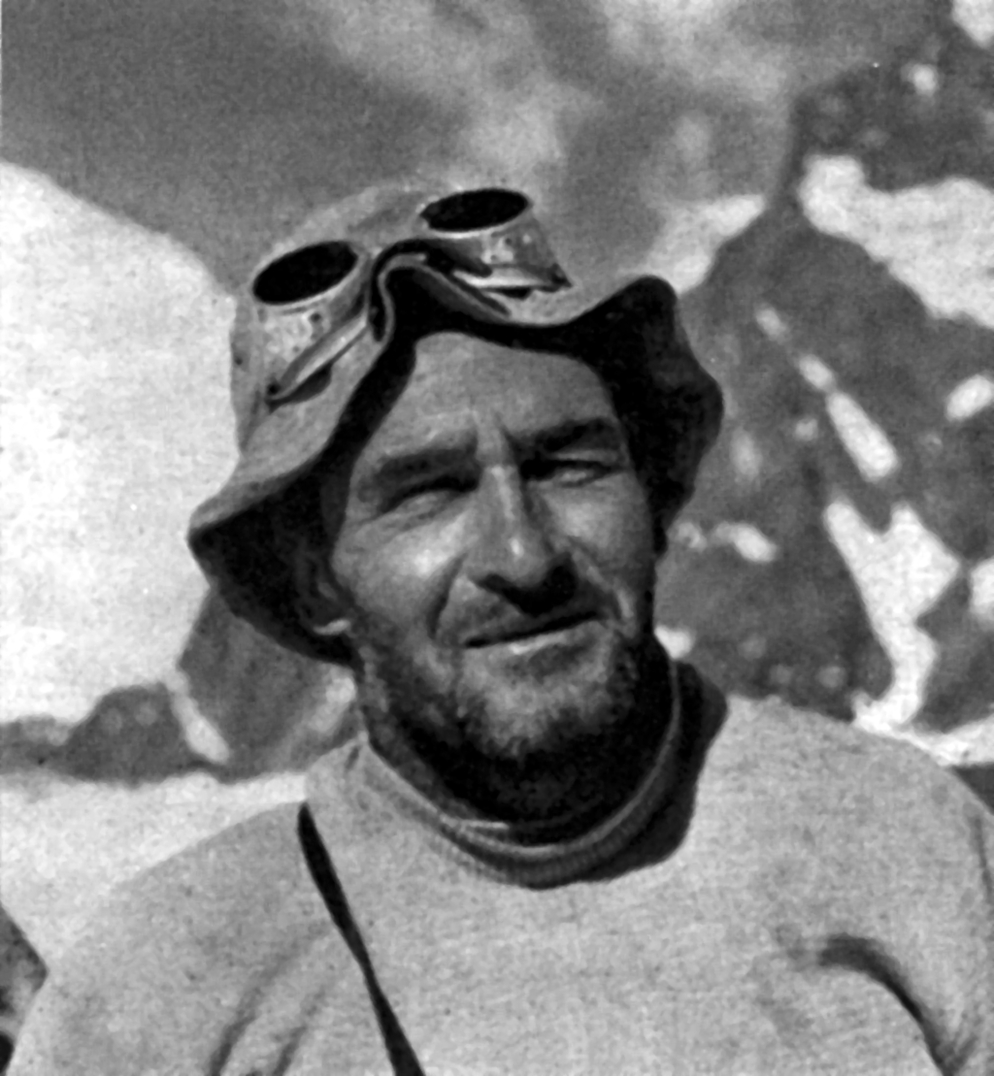
- Gino Soldà in 1954

Personal information
- Nationality: Italian
- Born: 8 March 1907; Recoaro Terme, Italy
- Died: 8 November 1989 (aged 82); Recoaro Terme, Italy

Sport
- Sport: Cross-country skiing

Gino Soldà (8 March 1907 – 8 November 1989) was an Italian cross-country skier. He competed in the men's 18 kilometre event at the 1932 Winter Olympics.
