= Nort Billings =

American cross-country skier

Norton Billings
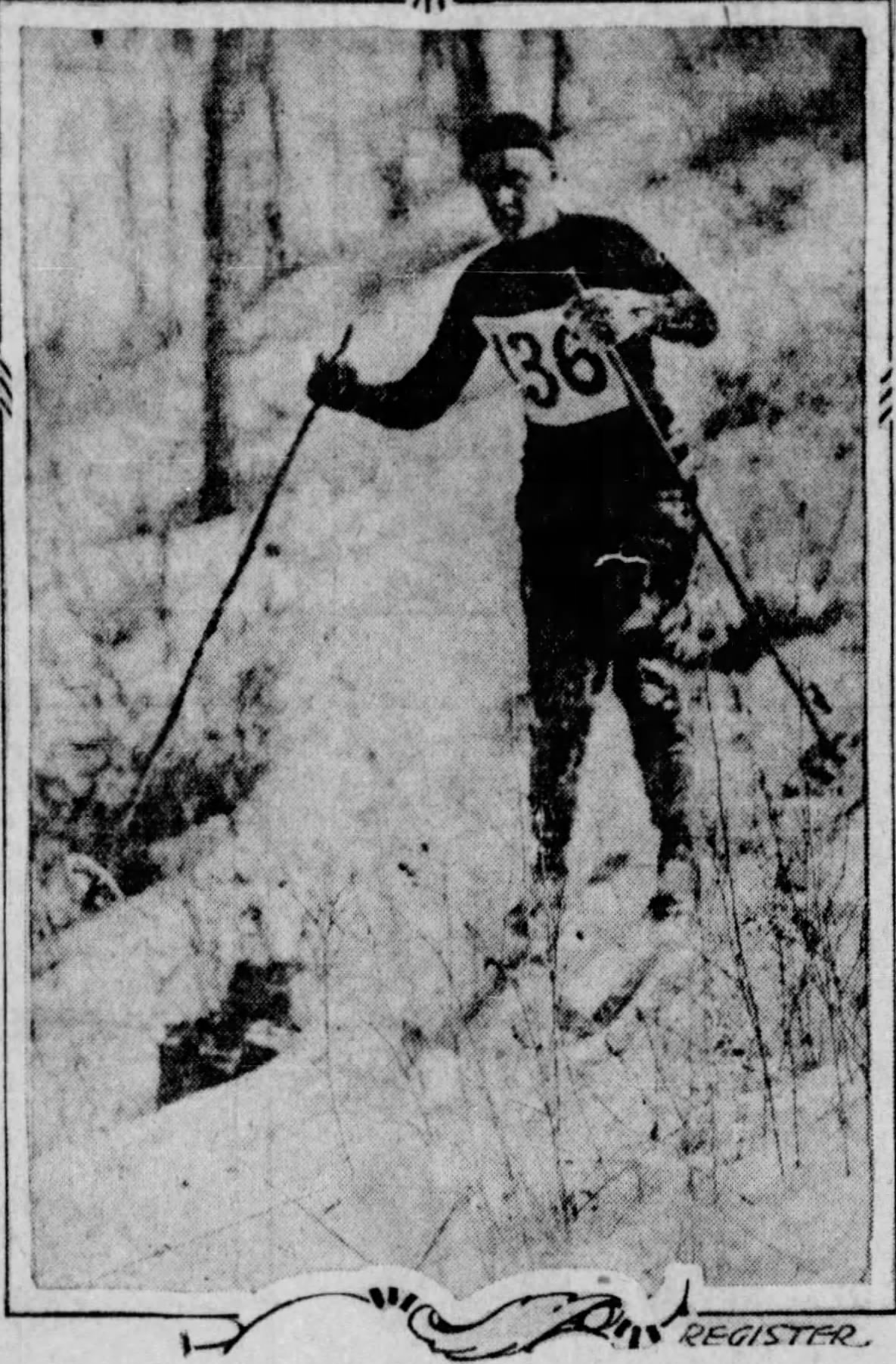
- Billings in 1925 at a race in Canton, South Dakota

Personal information
- Nationality: American
- Born: November 8, 1904 Lyons, Colorado, United States
- Died: May 1, 1994 (aged 89) Longmont, Colorado, United States

Sport
- Sport: Cross-country skiing

Norton R. Billings (1904–1994) was an American Olympic Cross country skier who was inducted into the Colorado Ski and Snowboard Museum Hall of Fame in 1999.

Nort was born November 8, 1904, in the family home near Lyons, Colorado, to Norman A. and Bessie McCall Billings.

== Background ==
His grandparents were early Colorado pioneers. His mother’s father was Thomas McCall, who in 1860, homesteaded west of the area that later became Longmont, and built McCall Lake, just off McCall Road. His paternal grandfather, Norton H. Billings arrived in the Lyons area by covered wagon in 1878.

Nort, along with his many siblings, grew up in the mountains around Lyons; living in relatively primitive conditions. His father operated a timber operation and the lumber camp was not a place of luxury. He graduated from Estes Park High School in 1923 with three other classmates.

After chores and school, he learned to cross country ski. He would tell stories when unprepared for the snow, he and his siblings would break up barrels to use the slats as skis to get to or from school. Throughout his teenage years and into his twenties, Nort and his friends regularly skied over the Continental Divide from Estes Park to Grand Lake. At age seventeen he used his skill at skiing to secure a job carrying supplies from Estes Park to Fern Lake, the winter headquarters of the Colorado Mountain Club. The job required great "legs" and stamina, which would help in his training for the Olympics. As a young man he entered many regional ski competitions for cross-country and was often the victor. He was a member of the Rocky Mountain National Park Ski Club, an organization founded and supported by the town of Estes Park. He won the club's "Elkhorn Trophy" by finishing first in annual competitions in 1924, 1925, and 1926.

Nort married in 1928 and became a father soon after. He did not have the time to regularly compete, but was still one of the top cross-country skiers in the US. Despite having not secured a spot on the 1932 Olympic Cross Country team, he took the $160 he was given for lodging and transportation and headed to Lake Placid, New York, and made the team. Poor snow conditions and rigorous terrain caused the tip of his ski to splinter, forcing him to retire from the 50 km competition despite struggling for nearly five hours with the broken ski. Only about half of the field of 39 contestants finished.

Colorado sent three skiers to the 1932 Olympics, Norton Billings, Jim Harsh of Hot Sulphur Springs, and John Steele from Steamboat Springs. It was the first time the United States had a full ski competing.

Until his death in 1994, Nort remained healthy and active in the Longmont area. He still skied and fished the pond by his cabin near Estes Park.
