= Markku Toikka =

Finnish stand-up comedian and actor (born 1955)

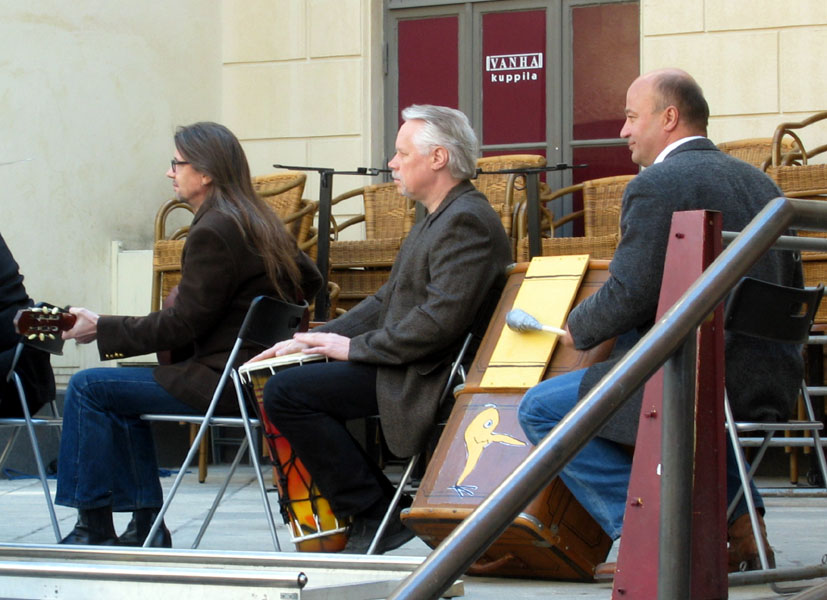
- Markku Toikka (right) in May 2006
- Born: Markku Tapani Toikka; 5 April 1955 (age 71); Somero, Finland

Markku Tapani Toikka (born 5 April 1955 in Somero, Finland) is a Finnish stand-up comedian and actor.

His acting roles include "Rahikainen" in Aki Kaurismäki's Crime and Punishment and "Pekka" in another Aki Kaurismäki film Calamari Union. In Calamari Union, Pekka appears for most of the film to gibber in English in an apparent schizophrenic delusion about his days as a soldier of fortune. This viewer interpretation is subverted towards the end of the movie, as a group of Latin American freedom fighters wreak their vengeance by shooting him like a dog.

As a stand-up comic, his shtick has largely been that of the balding middle aged man going through an identity crisis.

He lives in Helsinki with his wife, Ulla-Maija, and two children, son Toivo Toikka, who plays in band called "Security" and acts in amateur movies, and daughter named Tuuli.
