= Gaetano Lanfranchi =

Italian bobsledder (1901–1983)

Gaetano Lanfranchi (April 8, 1901 – April 8, 1983) was an Italian bobsledder who competed in the early 1930s. He was born in Palazzolo sull'Oglio. At the 1932 Winter Olympics in Lake Placid, New York, he finished fifth in the four-man event and eighth in the two-man event.
