= Italo Casini =

Italian bobsledder (1892–1937)

Italo Casini (March 9, 1892 – November 16, 1937) was an Italian bobsledder who competed in the early 1930s. At the 1932 Winter Olympics in Lake Placid, New York, United States, he finished fifth in the four-man event and sixth in the two-man event.

Conte Italo Francesco Niccolo Casini was born on March 9, 1892, in Soiana, Kingdom of Italy. He died on November 16, 1937, in London, England at the age of 45.
