= Ingenuino Dallagio =

Italian ski jumper

Personal information
- Nationality: Italian
- Born: 16 March 1910; Cortina d'Ampezzo, Italy
- Died: 9 July 1999 (aged 89); Cortina d'Ampezzo, Italy

Sport
- Sport: Ski jumping

Ingenuino Dallagio (16 March 1910 – 9 July 1999) was an Italian ski jumper. He competed in the individual event at the 1932 Winter Olympics.
