= Raymond Berthet =

French cross-country skier (1909–1979)

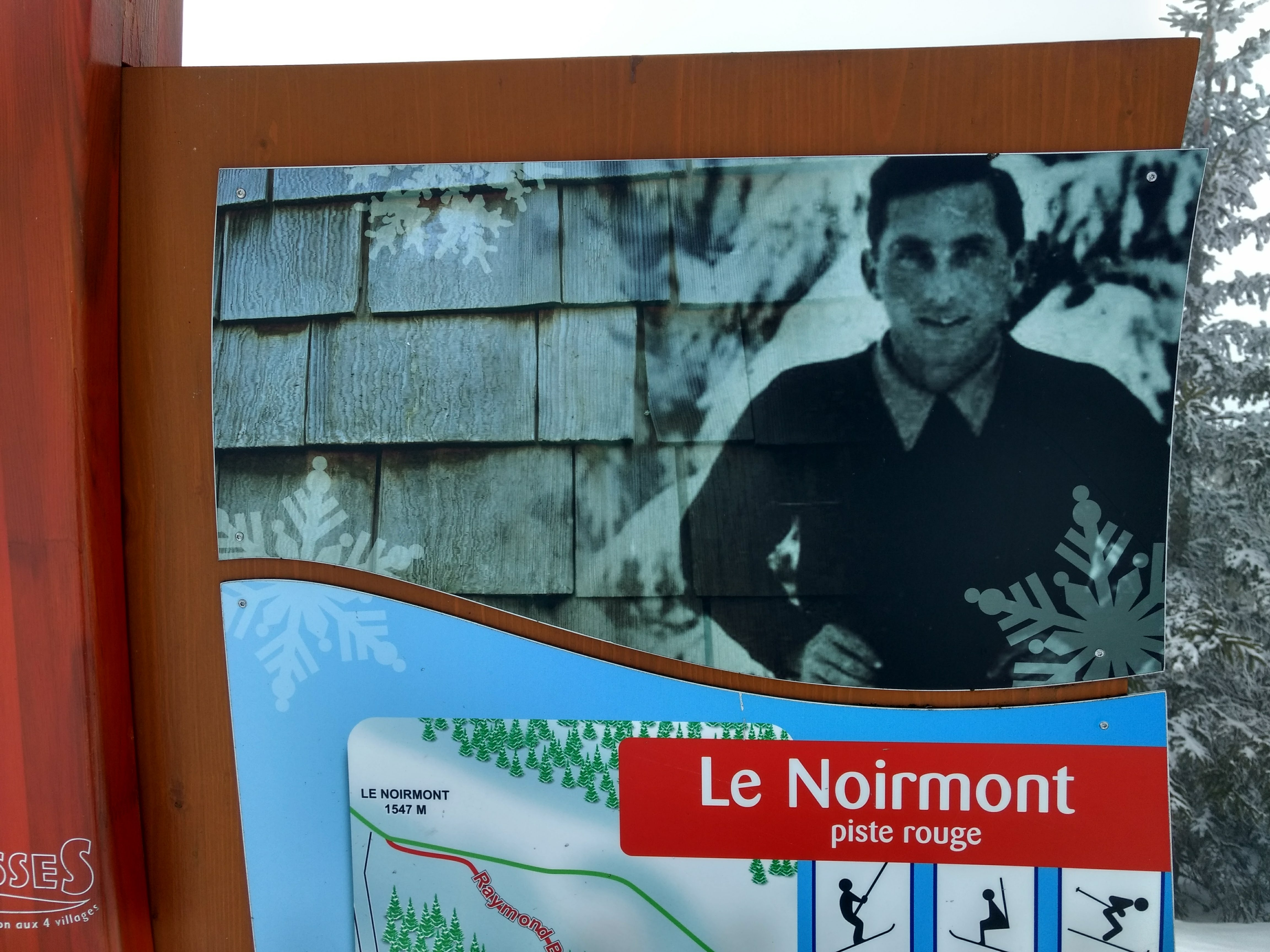
- Portrait of Raymond Berthet.

Personal information
- Nationality: French
- Born: 27 August 1909; Les Rousses, France
- Died: 8 March 1979 (aged 69); Dole, France

Sport
- Sport: Cross-country skiing

Raymond Berthet (27 August 1909 – 8 March 1979) was a French cross-country skier. He competed in the men's 18 kilometre event at the 1932 Winter Olympics.
