= Erminio Sertorelli =

Italian cross-country skier

Erminio Sertorelli (6 April 1901 – 13 November 1979) was an Italian cross-country skier.

== Biography ==
Sertorelli, born in Bormio, was the first of eleven children of Costante Sertorelli (d. 1922) and his wife Maria (1880–1956). His brother Giacinto was an Olympic alpine skier and his brother Stefano was a member of the national Olympic military patrol winner team of 1936.

In 1931, Erminio Sertorelli won the 50 kilometres event at the Italian men's championships of cross-country skiing. He represented his country as standard-bearer at the 1932 Winter Olympics, and placed 12th at the 50 kilometre cross-country skiing event, although his ski and then his stick broke. But he picked up the stick, lost by Veli Saarinen, and continued the race.

== See also ==
- List of flag bearers for Italy at the Olympics

Winter Olympics
Preceded by Ferdinando Glück	Flag bearer for Italy; 1932 Lake Placid	Succeeded by Adriano Guarnieri
