= Albert Secrétant =

French cross-country skier (1906–1991)

Personal information
- Nationality: French
- Born: 3 January 1906; Saint-Claude, France
- Died: 5 April 1991 (aged 85)

Sport
- Sport: Cross-country skiing

Albert Secrétant (3 January 1906 – 5 April 1991) was a French cross-country skier. He competed in the men's 18 kilometre event at the 1932 Winter Olympics.
