= Paul Mugnier =

French cross-country skier (1906–1985)

Personal information
- Nationality: French
- Born: 10 February 1906; Argentière, France
- Died: 30 January 1985 (aged 78)

Sport
- Sport: Cross-country skiing

Paul Mugnier (10 February 1906 – 30 January 1985) was a French cross-country skier. He competed in the men's 18 kilometre event at the 1932 Winter Olympics.
