= Stefano Sertorelli =

Italian soldier and skier (1911–1994)

Personal information
- Born: 24 December 1911 Bormio, Italy
- Died: 17 December 1994 (aged 82) Bormio, Italy

Sport
- Sport: Skiing

Stefano Sertorelli (24 December 1911 – 17 December 1994) was an Italian soldier and skier.

== Biography ==
Sertorello, son of Cantoniere Costante Sertorelli (d. 1922) and his wife Maria (1880–1956) was born in Bormio, Lombardy. The family was a real skiing family, for example his brother Erminio (1901–1979) was a successful cross-country skier, and his brother Giacinto (1914–1938), who died in an accident during a downhill race in 1938, was a successful alpine skier.

Stefano Sertorelli by himself served at the mountain warfare school of the Italian Army called Scuola Militare di Alpinismo (today: Centro Addestramento Alpino), which was founded in 1934. He was a member of the national Olympic military patrol team, which placed first at the 1936 Winter Olympics. Afterwards he preferred alpine skiing, took part in several national and international races and won several national championship titles. In the end of 1950 he founded together with the mountain guide and writer Lodovico Cusini the first skiing school of Livigno under the name Scuola Sci Livitur.
