= Agostino Lanfranchi =

Italian bobsledder and skeleton racer (1892–1963)

Agostino Lanfranchi (24 June 1892 – 15 February 1963) was an Italian bobsledder and skeleton racer who competed from the late 1920s to the early 1940s. Competing in two Winter Olympics, he finished fourth in the men's skeleton event at St. Moritz in 1928, and Lake Placid, New York, in 1932, he finished fifth in the four-man event and eighth in the two-man event (misspelled Agostini in the two-man event).

Lanfranchi was part of the clothing empire that developed many buttons and belt buckles for women's fashions during his lifetime. He was also active in motorboat racing, developing events in Venice and Turin.
