= Francesco Dezulian =

Italian cross-country skier

Personal information
- Nationality: Italian
- Born: 29 August 1908; Predazzo, Italy
- Died: 27 December 1979 (aged 71)

Sport
- Sport: Cross-country skiing

Francesco Dezulian (29 August 1908 – 27 December 1979) was an Italian cross-country skier. He competed in the men's 50 kilometre event at the 1932 Winter Olympics.
