= Iwao Ageishi =

Japanese cross-country skier (1908–1991)

Personal information
- Nationality: Japan
- Born: 11 January 1908; Kanaya, Niigata, Japan
- Died: 12 June 1991 (aged 83)
- Height: 1.66 m (5 ft 5 in)
- Weight: 72 kg (159 lb)

Sport
- Sport: Cross-country skiing

Iwao Ageishi (上石 巌, Ageishi Iwao, 11 January 1908 – 12 June 1991) was a Japanese cross-country skier. He competed in the 1932 Winter Olympics.
