= Ernesto Zardini =

Italian ski jumper 1908–1934

Personal information
- Nationality: Italian
- Born: 5 June 1908; Cortina d'Ampezzo, Kingdom of Italy
- Died: 3 October 1934 (aged 26); Arvier, Kingdom of Italy

Sport
- Sport: Ski jumping

Ernesto Zardini (5 June 1908 – 3 October 1934) was an Italian ski jumper. He competed in the individual event at the 1932 Winter Olympics.
