= Teofilo Guiscardo Rossi di Montelera =

Italian bobsledder (1902–1991)

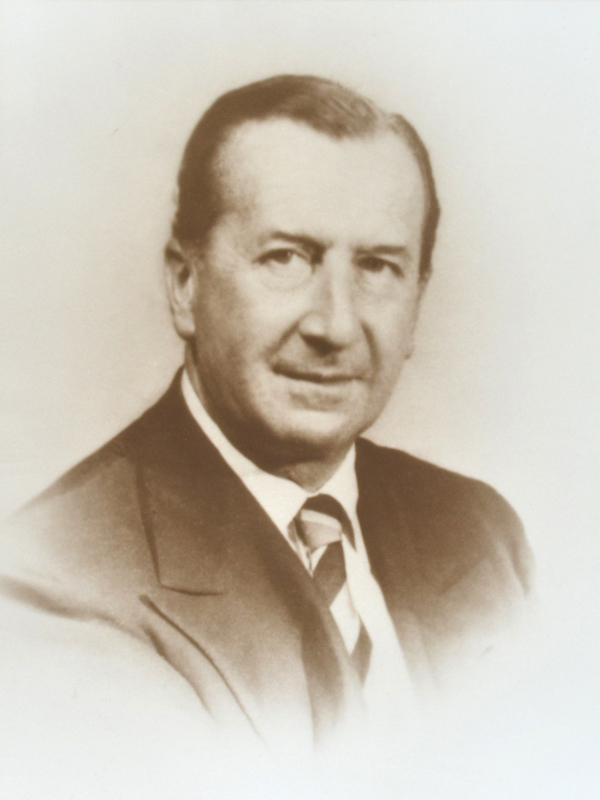
Teofilo Guiscardo Rossi di Montelera

Count Teofilo "Theo" Guiscardo Francesco Luigi Rossi di Montelera, Prince of Premuda (17 May 1902 – 3 November 1991) was an Italian bobsleigher who competed in the early 1930s. Born in Turin, he was the heir of the Rossi family, a dynasty of very wealthy distillers, dubbed "kings of Vermouth", partners in the Martini e Rossi firm.

Count Rossi was a world champion power boat racer. He won the 1934 World Championship for 12-Litre boats in a series of events in Europe and America. In 1937, Rossi again won the world championship, which included a victory in the President's Cup Regatta in Washington, D.C. In 1938, he won the American Power Boat Association's Gold Cup in Detroit, Michigan with his boat Alagi. He is one of the very few powerboat racers to have ever defeated arch US powerboating champion racer Gar Wood. He was a multiple winner of the arduous powerboating endurance race down the Po River, the Pavia-Venezia. He was set to defend the Gold Cup in 1939 when war broke out in Italy, and he was forced to stay home and deal with the Nazi threat.

At the 1932 Winter Olympics in Lake Placid, New York, he finished fifth in the four-man event and sixth in the two-man event. Two 1975 Porsche 917 models were made in his honour. Martini e Rossi maintained a tradition of sponsoring offshore powerboating teams and events long after Rossi's death.
