= Andrea Vuerich =

Italian cross-country skier

Personal information
- Nationality: Italian
- Born: 6 October 1907; Pontebba, Italy
- Died: 23 April 1964 (aged 56)

Sport
- Sport: Cross-country skiing

Andrea Vuerich (6 October 1907 – 23 April 1964) was an Italian cross-country skier. He competed at the 1932 Winter Olympics and the 1936 Winter Olympics.
