= Veli Saarinen =

Finnish cross-country skier (1902–1969)

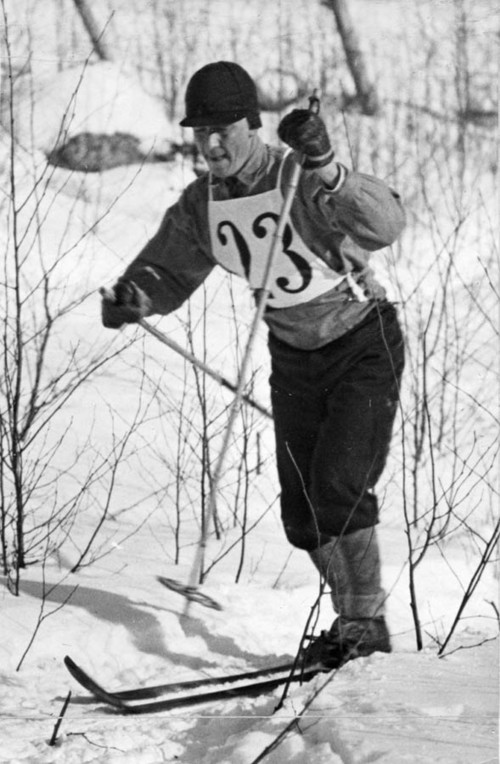
- Saarinen in the 1930s

Personal information
- Born: 16 September 1902 Martinsaari, Virolahti, Finland
- Died: 12 October 1969 (aged 67) Helsinki, Finland
- Height: 173 cm (5 ft 8 in)
- Weight: 65 kg (143 lb)

Sport
- Sport: Cross-country skiing
- Club: Kouvolan Hiihtoseura; Lahden Hiihtoseura
Medal record
Men's cross-country skiing
Representing Finland
Olympic Games
Gold medal – first place	1932 Lake Placid	50 km
Bronze medal – third place	1932 Lake Placid	18 km
World Championships}
Gold medal – first place	1929 Zakopane	17 km
Gold medal – first place	1933 Innsbruck	50 km
Gold medal – first place	1934 Sollefteå	4 × 10 km relay
Silver medal – second place	1929 Zakopane	50 km
Silver medal – second place	1934 Sollefteå	18 km
Bronze medal – third place	1926 Lahti	30 km

Veli Selim Saarinen (16 September 1902 – 12 October 1969) was a Finnish cross-country skier who competed in the 1928 and 1932 Olympics.

In 1928, he finished fourth in the 18 km event. In 1932, he won a gold in the 50 km and a bronze in the 18 km event, becoming the first Finnish cross-country skier to win an Olympic gold medal. Yet his biggest success came at the FIS Nordic World Ski Championships, where he won six medals between 1926 and 1934, including three gold medals.

Domestically Saarinen won only two titles, over 50 km in 1930–31. In 1934, he retired from competitions and later coached the German (1934–1937) and Finnish (1937–1968) national cross-country skiing teams. From 1947 to 1968, he also served as a chief executive of the Finnish Skiing Federation.

== Cross-country skiing results ==
All results are sourced from the International Ski Federation (FIS).

=== Olympic Games ===
- 2 medals – (1 gold, 1 bronze)

Year	Age	18 km	50 km
1928	25	4	—
1932	29	Bronze	Gold

=== World Championships ===
- 6 medals – (3 gold, 2 silver, 1 bronze)

Year	Age	17 km	18 km	30 km	50 km	4 × 10 km relay
1926	23	—N/a	—N/a	Bronze	9	—N/a
1929	26	Gold	—N/a	—N/a	Silver	—N/a
1930	27	5	—N/a	—N/a	6	—N/a
1933	30	—N/a	4	—N/a	Gold	—
1934	31	—N/a	Silver	—N/a	—	Gold
