= Léonce Crétin =

French cross-country skier (1910–1994)

Léonce Fernand Crétin
Personal information
- Nationality: French
- Born: 1 March 1910; Rolle, Nyon, Canton of Vaud, Switzerland
- Died: 28 August 1994 (aged 84); Houtaud, France

Sport
- Sport: Cross-country skiing

Léonce Fernand Crétin (1 March 1910 – 28 August 1994) was a French cross-country skier. He competed at the 1932 Winter Olympics and the 1936 Winter Olympics.
