= Jaroslav Feistauer =

Czech cross-country skier

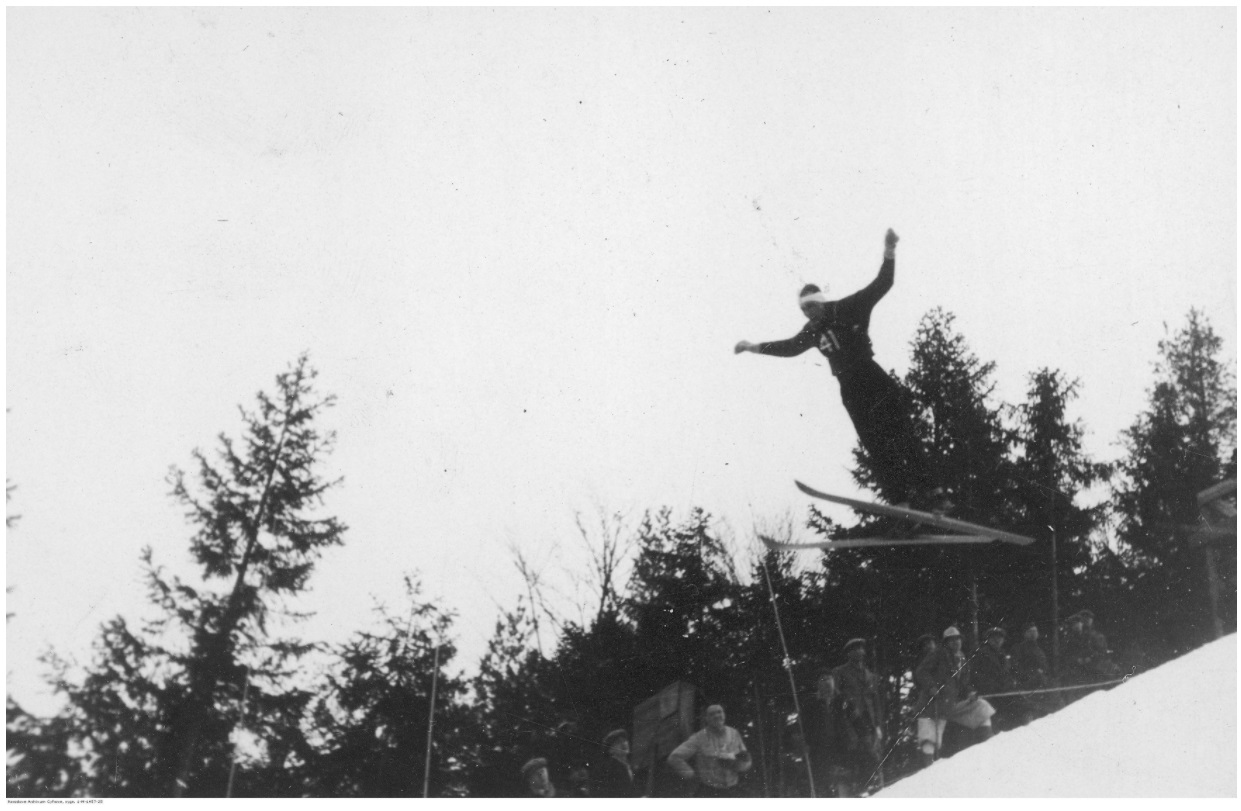
- Feistauer in 1934

Personal information
- Nationality: Czech
- Born: 12 May 1909; Zlatá Olešnice, Austria-Hungary

Sport
- Sport: Cross-country skiing

Jaroslav Feistauer (born 12 May 1909, date of death unknown) was a Czech cross-country skier. He competed in the men's 18 kilometre event at the 1932 Winter Olympics.
