= Jan Cífka =

Czech cross-country skier

Personal information
- Nationality: Czech
- Born: 12 April 1909; České Budějovice, Austria-Hungary
- Died: 21 August 1978 (aged 69)

Sport
- Sport: Cross-country skiing

Jan Cífka (12 April 1909 – 21 August 1978) was a Czech cross-country skier. He competed in the men's 18 kilometre event at the 1932 Winter Olympics.
