= FIS Nordic World Ski Championships 1930 =

1930 edition of the FIS Nordic World Ski Championships

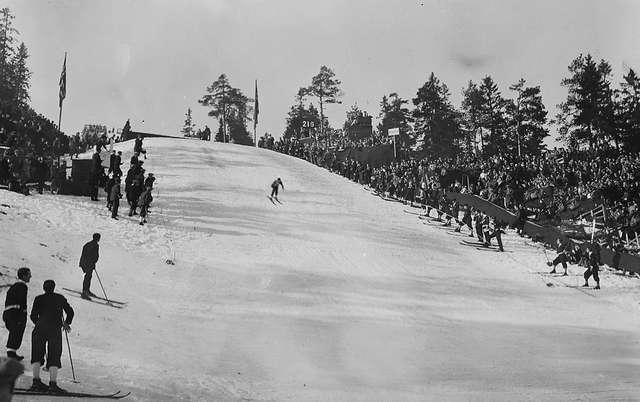
- Ski jumping during the event
- Host city: Oslo
- Country: Norway
- Events: 4
- Opening: 27 February 1930
- Closing: 1 March 1930

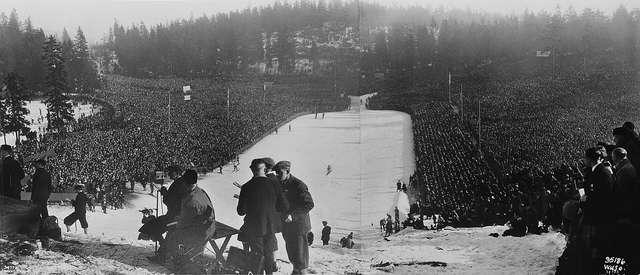

The FIS Nordic World Ski Championships 1930 took place between February 27 and March 1, 1930 in Oslo, Norway at the Holmenkollen.

== Men's cross country ==
=== 17 km ===
February 28, 1930

Medal	Athlete	Time
Gold	Arne Rustadstuen (NOR)	1:19:58
Silver	Trygve Brodahl (NOR)	1:20:24
Bronze	Tauno Lappalainen (FIN)	1:20:30

=== 50 km ===
March 1, 1930

Medal	Athlete	Time
Gold	Sven Utterström (SWE)	3:53:14
Silver	Arne Rustadstuen (NOR)	3:54:07
Bronze	Adiel Paananen (FIN)	3:57:46

== Men's Nordic combined ==
=== Individual ===
February 27, 1930

Medal	Athlete	Points
Gold	Hans Vinjarengen (NOR)	446.00
Silver	Leif Skagnæs (NOR)	432.61
Bronze	Knut Lunde (NOR)	428.80

== Men's ski jumping ==
=== Individual large hill ===
February 27, 1930

Medal	Athlete	Points
Gold	Gunnar Andersen (NOR)	224.4
Silver	Reidar Andersen (NOR)	223.8
Bronze	Sigmund Ruud (NOR)	218.5

== Medal table ==
Rank	Nation	Gold	Silver	Bronze	Total
1	Norway (NOR)	3	4	2	9
2	Sweden (SWE)	1	0	0	1
3	Finland (FIN)	0	0	2	2
Totals (3 entries)		4	4	4	12
