= Cross-country skiing at the 1932 Winter Olympics =

Cross-country skiing at the III Olympic Winter Games
- Dates: 10–13 February 1932
- No. of events: 2
- Competitors: 58 from 11 nations

At the 1932 Winter Olympics, two cross-country skiing events were contested. The 18 km competition was held on Wednesday, 10 February 1932, while the 50 km event was held on Saturday, 13 February 1932.

== Medal summary ==
=== Medal table ===
Rank	Nation	Gold	Silver	Bronze	Total
1	Finland	1	1	1	3
2	Sweden	1	1	0	2
3	Norway	0	0	1	1
Totals (3 entries)		2	2	2	6

=== Events ===
Event	Gold		Silver		Bronze	
18 km	Sven Utterström; Sweden	1:23:07	Axel Wikström; Sweden	1:25:07	Veli Saarinen; Finland	1:25:24
50 km	Veli Saarinen; Finland	4:28:00	Väinö Liikkanen; Finland	4:28:20	Arne Rustadstuen; Norway	4:31:53

== Participating nations ==
Cross-country skiers from Austria and France only competed in the 18 km event. Sixteen cross-country skiers competed in both events.

A total of 58 cross-country skiers from eleven nations competed at the Lake Placid Games:

- Austria (3)
- Canada (7)
- Czechoslovakia (4)
- Finland (5)
- France (5)
- Italy (6)
- Japan (6)
- Norway (6)
- Poland (4)
- Sweden (6)
- United States (7)
