= 1932 Winter Olympics medal table =

1932 Winter Olympics medals
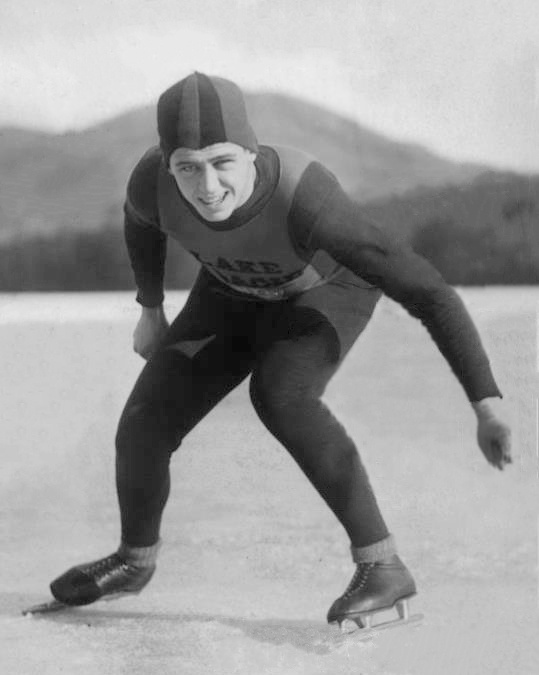
- Jack Shea of the United States tied for most gold medals won at the 1932 Winter Olympics, winning two in men's speed skating.
- Location: Lake Placid, New York, US

Highlights
- Most gold medals: United States (6)
- Most total medals: United States (12)
- Medalling NOCs: 10

1932 Winter Olympic Games medal map Legend: Gold represents countries that won at least one gold medal Silver represents countries that won at least one silver medal Bronze represents countries that won at least one bronze medal Red represents countries that did not win any medals Grey represents countries that did not participate

The 1932 Winter Olympics, officially known as the III Olympic Winter Games, were an international multi-sport event held in Lake Placid, New York, United States, from February 4 to 15, 1932. A total of 252 athletes representing 17 National Olympic Committees (NOCs) participated, 8 NOCs (Note: Argentina, Estonia, Latvia, Lithuania, Luxembourg, Mexico, the Netherlands, and Yugoslavia did not send athletes to these games.) fewer than the last Winter Games in St. Moritz, Switzerland. The games featured 14 events in 4 sports across 7 disciplines. These Winter Games were the first held outside Europe, with prior editions held in Chamonix, France, and St. Moritz, Switzerland.

Overall, athletes representing 10 NOCs won at least one medal, and 7 NOCs won at least one gold medal. Host nation United States won the most gold medals and the most overall medals, with 6 and 12 respectively. Hungary's team obtained their first Winter Olympic medal, with figure skaters Emília Rotter and László Szollás winning bronze in the pair skating event. Norway achieved two podium sweeps at the games, in the individual Nordic combined event with Johan Grøttumsbråten winning the gold, Ole Stenen winning the silver, and Hans Vinjarengen winning the bronze, and in the individual ski jump event with Birger Ruud winning the gold, Hans Beck winning the silver, and Kaare Wahlberg winning the bronze.

Speed skaters Irving Jaffee and Jack Shea, both from the United States, tied for the most gold medals won for an individual at the games, with two. Shea became the first American athlete to win multiple gold medals at the same Olympic Winter Games. Alongside Jaffee and Shea, cross-country skier Veli Saarinen of Finland and speed skaters Alexander Hurd and Willy Logan of Canada tied for the most total medals won with two each. Bobsledder Eddie Eagan of the United States became the first and only person to win a gold medal in different events at the Summer Olympics and Winter Olympics, (Note: Gillis Grafström also won gold in both the Summer and Winter Olympic Games but in the same event: figure skating, which had been contested in the 1920 Summer Olympics.) after winning the gold medal in the four-man event at these games and in the men's light heavyweight event in boxing at the 1920 Summer Olympics in Antwerp, Belgium.

== Medals ==
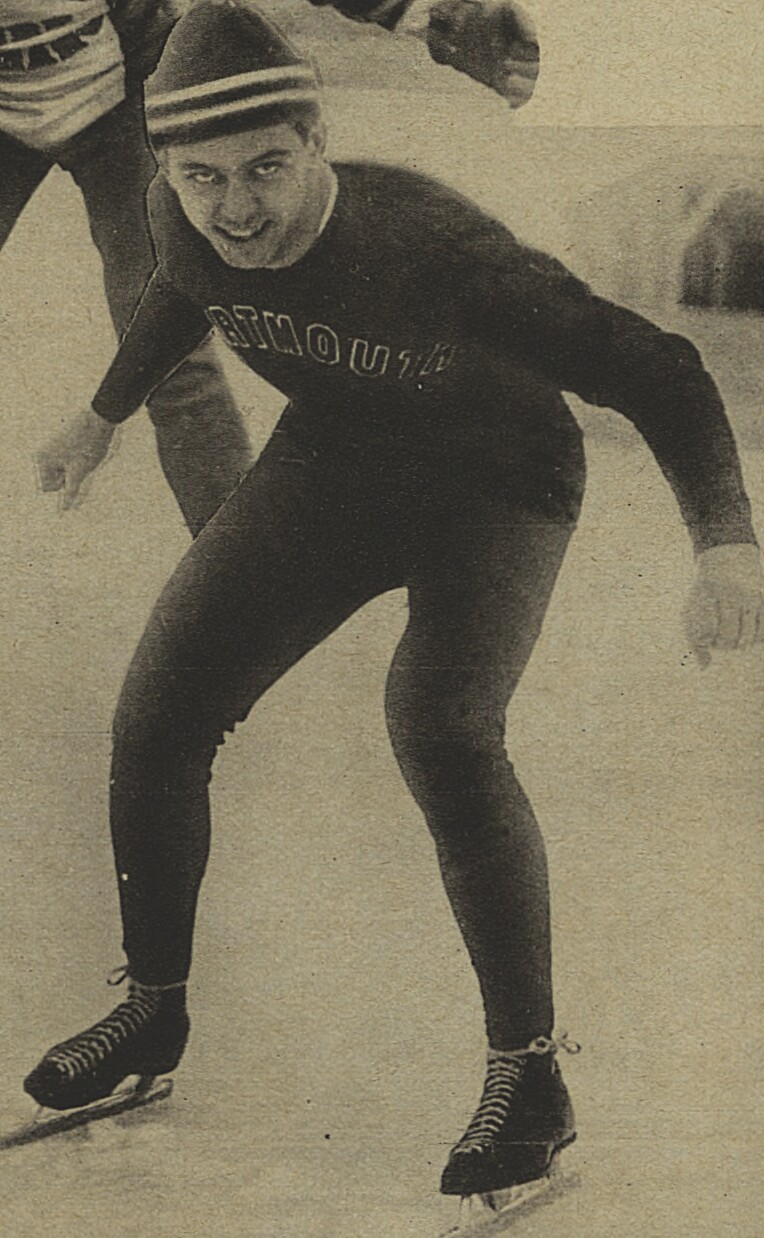
Speed skater Irving Jaffee tied for most gold medals won at these games, winning two gold medals alongside Shea.

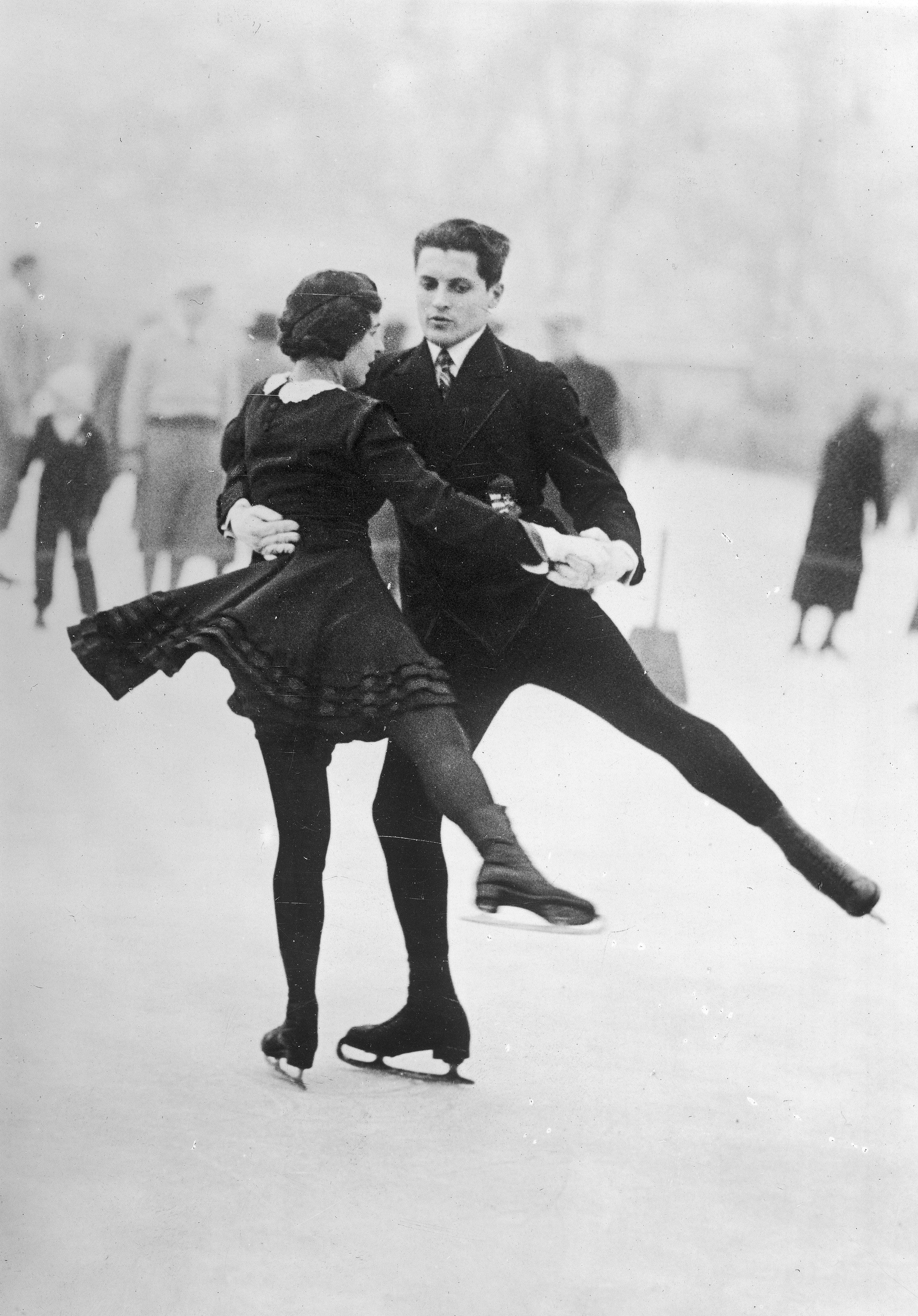
Figure skaters Emília Rotter and László Szollás, the first Winter Olympic medalists for Hungary.

The medals used for the 1932 Winter Olympics were minted by the Robbins Company. The obverse of the medals featured a design of a goddess holding a laurel wreath behind the Adirondack Mountains. It also featured the host city's landscape with a stadium and a ski jumping hill. The reverse of the medals featured the Olympic rings, the official name of the games, and a laurel wreath. The medal itself had curved ridges that were said to represent ancient Greek columns.

For the first time in Olympic history, medals awarded to athletes were given out on podiums. The podiums were based on the medal awarding of the athletics events at the 1930 British Empire Games in Hamilton, Canada, where winning athletes stood on top of a podium while the second- and third-placed athletes stood on their sides, one step below. Then-president of the International Olympic Committee (IOC), Henri de Baillet-Latour, saw the practice and developed his own version. Instructions to use De Baillet-Latour's version of the practice were sent out by the IOC to the organizing committees of the 1932 Summer Olympics and 1932 Winter Olympics. Shea became the first Olympic champion to be awarded a medal on top of a podium after winning the gold medal at the men's 500 metres event in speed skating.

== Medal table ==
The medal table is based on information provided by the International Olympic Committee (IOC) and is consistent with IOC conventional sorting in its published medal tables. The table uses the Olympic medal table sorting method. By default, the table is ordered by the number of gold medals the athletes from a nation have won, where a nation is an entity represented by a NOC. The number of silver medals is taken into consideration next and then the number of bronze medals. If teams are still tied, equal ranking is given and they are listed alphabetically by their IOC country code.

* Host nation (United States)

1932 Winter Olympics medal table
Rank	Nation	Gold	Silver	Bronze	Total
1	United States*	6	4	2	12
2	Norway	3	4	3	10
3	Sweden	1	2	0	3
4	Canada	1	1	5	7
5	Finland	1	1	1	3
6	Austria	1	1	0	2
7	France	1	0	0	1
8	Switzerland	0	1	0	1
9	Germany	0	0	2	2
10	Hungary	0	0	1	1
Totals (10 entries)		14	14	14	42
