= United States at the 1932 Winter Olympics =

- Flag of the United States
- IOC code: USA
- NOC: United States Olympic Committee

in Lake Placid
- Competitors: 64 (58 men, 6 women) in 4 sports
- Flag bearer: Billy Fiske (bobsleigh)
- Medals Ranked 1st: Gold 6 Silver 4 Bronze 2 Total 12

Winter Olympics appearances (overview)
- 1924; 1928; 1932; 1936; 1948; 1952; 1956; 1960; 1964; 1968; 1972; 1976; 1980; 1984; 1988; 1992; 1994; 1998; 2002; 2006; 2010; 2014; 2018; 2022; 2026

The United States of America (USA) was the host nation for the 1932 Winter Olympics in Lake Placid, New York.

== Medalists ==
The following U.S. competitors won medals at the games. In the by discipline sections below, medalists' names are bolded.

Medal	Name	Sport	Event	Date
Gold	Jack Shea	Speed skating	500 meters	February 4
Gold	Irving Jaffee	Speed skating	5000 meters	February 4
Gold	Jack Shea	Speed skating	1500 meters	February 5
Gold	Irving Jaffee	Speed skating	10,000 meters	February 8
Gold	Curtis Stevens; Hubert Stevens	Bobsleigh	Two-man	February 9
Gold	Eddie Eagan; Billy Fiske; Clifford Grey; Jay O'Brien	Bobsleigh	Four-man	February 15
Silver	Eddie Murphy	Speed skating	5000 meters	February 4
Silver	Sherwin Badger; Beatrix Loughran	Figure skating	Pairs	February 12
Silver	United States men's national ice hockey team: Osborne Anderson; Johnny Bent; John Chase; John Cookman; Douglas Everett; Franklin Farrel; Joseph Fitzgerald; Edwin Frazier; John Garrison; Gerard Hallock; Robert Livingston; Francis Nelson; Winthrop Palmer; Gordon Smith	Ice hockey	Men's tournament	February 13
Silver	Percy Bryant; Henry Homburger; Edmund Horton; Paul Stevens	Bobsleigh	Four-man	February 15
Bronze	John Heaton; Robert Minton	Bobsleigh	Two-man	February 9
Bronze	Maribel Vinson	Figure skating	Women's singles	February 10

Medals by sport
Sport	1st place, gold medalist(s)	2nd place, silver medalist(s)	3rd place, bronze medalist(s)	Total
Speed skating	4	1	0	**5**
Bobsleigh	2	1	1	**4**
Figure skating	0	1	1	**2**
Ice hockey	0	1	0	**1**
Total	6	4	2	12

Medals by date
Day	Date	1st place, gold medalist(s)	2nd place, silver medalist(s)	3rd place, bronze medalist(s)	Total
1	February 4	2	1	0	**3**
2	February 5	1	0	0	**1**
5	February 8	1	0	0	**1**
6	February 9	1	0	1	**2**
7	February 10	0	0	1	**1**
9	February 12	0	1	0	**1**
10	February 13	0	1	0	**1**
12	February 15	1	1	0	**2**
Total		6	4	2	12

Multiple medalists
Name	Sport	1st place, gold medalist(s)	2nd place, silver medalist(s)	3rd place, bronze medalist(s)	Total
Irving Jaffee	Speed skating	2	0	0	**2**
Jack Shea	Speed skating	2	0	0	**2**

== Bobsleigh ==
Athlete	Event	Run 1		Run 2		Run 3		Run 4		Total	
Athlete	Event	Time	Rank	Time	Rank	Time	Rank	Time	Rank	Time	Rank
John Heaton; Robert Minton	Two-man	2:15.02	4	2:07.51	3	2:04.29	3	2:02.33	3	8:29.15	3rd place, bronze medalist(s)
Hubert Stevens; Curtis Stevens	Two-man	2:13.10	3	2:04.27	1	1:59.69	1	1:57.68	1	8:14.74	1st place, gold medalist(s)
Billy Fiske; Eddie Eagan; Clifford Grey; Jay O'Brien	Four-man	2:00.52	1	1:59.16	1	1:57.41	1	1:56.59	2	7:53.68	1st place, gold medalist(s)
Henry Homburger; Percy Bryant; Francis Stevens; Edmund Horton	Four-man	2:01.77	2	2:01.09	2	1:58.56	3	1:54.28	1	7:55.70	2nd place, silver medalist(s)

== Cross-country skiing ==
Athlete	Event	Time	Rank
Erling Andersen	18 km	1:58:13	42
Rolf Monsen	18 km	1:42:36	33
Richard Parsons	18 km	1:40:08	28
Olle Zetterstrom	18 km	1:38:26	23
Nils Backstrom	50 km	5:25:40	19
Nort Billings	50 km	DNF	
Richard Parsons	50 km	5:13:59	15
Robert Reid	50 km	5:26:06	20

== Figure skating ==
Men

Athlete	Event	CF	FS	Total		
Athlete	Event	Rank	Rank	Places	Points	Rank
Gail Borden	Singles	7	9	54	2110.8	8
James Madden	Singles	8	7	52	2049.6	7
William Nagle	Singles	12	10	77	1884.8	11
Roger Turner	Singles	5	6	40	2297.6	6

Women

Athlete	Event	CF	FS	Total		
Athlete	Event	Rank	Rank	Places	Points	Rank
Margaret Bennett	Singles	12	8	75	1826.8	11
Suzanne Davis	Singles	10	14	83	1780.4	12
Maribel Vinson	Singles	3	3	23	2158.8	3rd place, bronze medalist(s)
Louise Weigel	Singles	14	13	92	1769.4	14

Mixed

Athlete	Event	Points	Score	Rank
Beatrix Loughran; Sherwin Badger	Pairs	16	77.5	2nd place, silver medalist(s)
Gertrude Meredith; Joseph Savage	Pairs	49	59.8	7

== Ice hockey ==
Summary

Team	Event	Opposition Score	Opposition Score	Opposition Score	Opposition Score	Opposition Score	Opposition Score	Rank
United States men	Men's tournament	Canada; L 1–2 OT	Poland; W 4–1	Germany; W 7–0	Poland; W 5–0	Germany; W 8–0	Canada; T 2–2 OT	2nd place, silver medalist(s)

Roster

Osborne Anderson
Johnny Bent
John Chase
John Cookman
Douglas Everett
Franklin Farrel
Joseph Fitzgerald
Edwin Frazier
John Garrison
Gerard Hallock
Robert Livingston
Francis Nelson
Winthrop Palmer
Gordon Smith

Tournament

Team	GP	W	L	T	GF	GA
Canada	6	5	0	1	32	4
United States	6	4	1	1	27	5
Germany	6	2	4	0	7	26
Poland	6	0	6	0	3	34

4 Feb	United States	1:2 OT (0:0,0:1,1:0,0:0,0:1)	Canada
5 Feb	United States	4:1 (1:0,2:0,1:1)	Poland
7 Feb	United States	7:0 (3:0,2:0,2:0)	Germany
8 Feb	United States	5:0 (1:0,1:0,3:0)	Poland
10 Feb	United States	8:0 (2:0,2:0,4:0)	Germany
13 Feb	United States	2:2 OT (1:1,1:0,0:1,0:0,0:0,0:0)	Canada

== Nordic combined ==
The cross-country skiing part of this event was combined with the 18 km race of cross-country skiing. Those results can be found above in this article in the cross-country skiing section. Some athletes (but not all) entered in both the cross-country skiing and Nordic combined event, their time on the 18 km was used for both events.

The ski jumping (normal hill) event was held separate from the main medal event of ski jumping, results can be found in the table below.

Athlete	Event	Cross-country		Ski Jumping			Total	
Athlete	Event	Time	Points	Distance 1	Distance 2	Points	Points	Rank
Edward Blood	Individual	1:41:58	170.25	51.5	46.0	191.2	361.45	14
Lloyd Ellingson	Individual	1:44:14	160.50	45.0	56.0	193.7	354.20	16
John Ericksen	Individual	1:54:58	115.50	49.5	54.0	200.8	316.30	25
Rolf Monsen	Individual	1:42:36	167.40	54.0	52.0	201.9	369.30	9

== Ski jumping ==
Athlete	Event	Jump 1			Jump 2			Total	
Athlete	Event	Distance	Points	Rank	Distance	Points	Rank	Points	Rank
Peder Falstad	Normal hill	56.0	96.1	18	62.5	103.4	12	199.5	13
Roy Mikkelsen	Normal hill	53.0	52.0 (fall)	31	DNF				
Caspar Oimoen	Normal hill	63.0	104.7	7	67.5	112.0	2	216.7	5
John Steele	Normal hill	55.0	98.0	14	56.0	97.6	16	195.6	15

== Speed skating ==
Athlete	Event	Heat	Final
Athlete	Event	Rank Time	Rank Time
John Farrell	500 m	2 Q	6
Ray Murray	500 m	3	Did not advance
Allan Potts	500 m	3	Did not advance
Jack Shea	500 m	2 Q	(gold); 43.4 OR
Lloyd Guenther	1500 m	6	Did not advance
Ray Murray	1500 m	1 Q 2:29.9	5
Jack Shea	1500 m	1 Q 2:58.0	(gold); 2:57.5
Herb Taylor	1500 m	1 Q 2:49.3	6
Irving Jaffee	5000 m	1 Q 9:52.0	(gold); 9:40.8
Eddie Murphy	5000 m	2 Q	2nd place, silver medalist(s)
Carl Springer	5000 m	6	Did not advance
Herb Taylor	5000 m	2 Q	4
Valentine Bialas	10,000 m	3 Q	5
Irving Jaffee	10,000 m	1 Q 18:05.4	(gold); 19:13.6
Edwin Wedge	10,000 m	4 Q	4
Eddie Schroeder	10,000 m	4 Q	8
