= Speed skating at the 1932 Winter Olympics – Men's 5000 metres =

Speed skating at the Olympics

Men's 5000 metres speed skating at the III Olympic Winter Games
- Pictogram for speed skating
- Venue: James B. Sheffield Olympic Skating Rink
- Date: 4 February 1932
- Competitors: 18 from 6 nations
- Winning time: 9:40.8

Medalists
1st place, gold medalist(s)		Irving Jaffee	United States
2nd place, silver medalist(s)		Eddie Murphy	United States
3rd place, bronze medalist(s)		Willy Logan	Canada

The 5000 metres speed skating event was part of the speed skating at the 1932 Winter Olympics programme. The competition was held on Thursday, February 4, 1932. Eighteen speed skaters from six nations competed. Like all other speed skating events at this Olympics the competition was held for the only time in pack-style format, having all competitors skate at the same time.

== Medalists ==
Gold	Silver	Bronze
Irving Jaffee; United States	Eddie Murphy; United States	Willy Logan; Canada

== Records ==
These were the standing world and Olympic records (in minutes) prior to the 1932 Winter Olympics.

World record	8:21.6(*)	(Norway) Ivar Ballangrud	Davos (SUI)	January 11, 1930
Olympic record	8:39.0	(Finland) Clas Thunberg	Chamonix (FRA)	January 26, 1924

(*) The record was set in a high altitude venue (more than 1000 metres above sea level) and on naturally frozen ice.

== Results ==
=== First round ===
Heat 1

Place	Name	Time	Qual.
1	Irving Jaffee (USA)	9:52.0	Q
2	Eddie Murphy (USA)		Q
3	Ivar Ballangrud (NOR)		Q
4	Harry Smyth (CAN)		Q
5	Ossi Blomqvist (FIN)		
–	Alexander Hurd (CAN)	DNF	
–	Shozo Ishihara (JPN)	DNF	
–	Michael Staksrud (NOR)	DNF	
–	Tomeju Uruma (JPN)	DNF	

Heat 2

Place	Name	Time	Qual.
1	Bernt Evensen (NOR)	10:01.4	Q
2	Herbert Taylor (USA)		Q
3	Willy Logan (CAN)		Q
4	Frank Stack (CAN)		Q
5	Erling Lindboe (NOR)		
6	Carl Springer (USA)		
–	Yasuo Kawamura (JPN)	DNF	
–	Tokuo Kitani (JPN)	DNF	
–	Ingvar Lindberg (SWE)	DNF	

=== Final ===
Place	Name	Time
1	Irving Jaffee (USA)	9:40.8
2	Eddie Murphy (USA)	2 m behind
3	Willy Logan (CAN)	4 m behind
4	Herbert Taylor (USA)	
5	Ivar Ballangrud (NOR)	
6	Bernt Evensen (NOR)	
7	Frank Stack (CAN)	
8	Harry Smyth (CAN)	
