= Speed skating at the 1932 Winter Olympics – Men's 1500 metres =

Speed skating at the Olympics

Men's 1500 metres speed skating at the III Olympic Winter Games
- Pictogram for speed skating
- Venue: James B. Sheffield Olympic Skating Rink
- Date: 5 February 1932
- Competitors: 18 from 6 nations
- Winning time: 2:57.5

Medalists
1st place, gold medalist(s)		Jack Shea	United States
2nd place, silver medalist(s)		Alexander Hurd	Canada
3rd place, bronze medalist(s)		Willy Logan	Canada

The 1500 metres speed skating event was part of the speed skating at the 1932 Winter Olympics programme. The competition was held on Friday, February 5, 1932. Eighteen speed skaters from six nations competed. Like all other speed skating events at this Olympics the competition was held for the only time in pack-style format, having all competitors skate at the same time.

== Medalists ==
Gold	Silver	Bronze
Jack Shea; United States	Alexander Hurd; Canada	Willy Logan; Canada

== Records ==
These were the standing world and Olympic records (in minutes) prior to the 1932 Winter Olympics.

World record	2:17.4(*)	(Norway) Oscar Mathisen	Davos (SUI)	January 18, 1914
Olympic record	2:20.8	(Finland) Clas Thunberg	Chamonix (FRA)	January 27, 1924

(*) The record was set in a high altitude venue (more than 1000 metres above sea level) and on naturally frozen ice.

== Results ==
=== First round ===
Heat 1

Place	Name	Time	Qual.
1	Herbert Taylor (USA)	2:49.3	Q
2	Frank Stack (CAN)		Q
3	Bernt Evensen (NOR)		
4	Hans Engnestangen (NOR)		
5	Ossi Blomqvist (FIN)		
6	Tomeju Uruma (JPN)		

Heat 2

Place	Name	Time	Qual.
1	Jack Shea (USA)	2:58.0	Q
2	Willy Logan (CAN)		Q
3	Ivar Ballangrud (NOR)		
4	Herbert Flack (CAN)		
5	Shozo Ishihara (JPN)		
6	Lloyd Guenther (USA)		

In the middle of the heat, the judges suddenly stopped the race. They accused the skaters of 'loafing' and ordered the race rerun.

Heat 3

Place	Name	Time	Qual.
1	Raymond Murray (USA)	2:29.9	Q
2	Alexander Hurd (CAN)		Q
3	Michael Staksrud (NOR)		
4	Yasuo Kawamura (JPN)		
5	Tokuo Kitani (JPN)		
6	Ingvar Lindberg (SWE)		

=== Final ===
Place	Name	Time
1	Jack Shea (USA)	2:57.5
2	Alexander Hurd (CAN)	5 m behind
3	Willy Logan (CAN)	6 m behind
4	Frank Stack (CAN)	
5	Raymond Murray (USA)	
6	Herbert Taylor (USA)	
