= Speed skating at the 1932 Winter Olympics – Men's 10,000 metres =

Speed skating at the Olympics

Men's 10,000 metres speed skating at the III Olympic Winter Games
- Pictogram for speed skating
- Venue: James B. Sheffield Olympic Skating Rink
- Date: 5–8 February 1932
- Competitors: 18 from 6 nations
- Winning time: 19:13.6

Medalists
1st place, gold medalist(s)		Irving Jaffee	United States
2nd place, silver medalist(s)		Ivar Ballangrud	Norway
3rd place, bronze medalist(s)		Frank Stack	Canada

The 10,000 metres speed skating event was part of the speed skating at the 1932 Winter Olympics programme. The competition was held on Friday, February 5, 1932, on Saturday, February 6, 1932, and on Monday, February 8, 1932. Eighteen speed skaters from six nations competed. Like all other speed skating events at this Olympics the competition was held for the only time in pack-style format, having all competitors skate at the same time.

== Medalists ==
Gold	Silver	Bronze
Irving Jaffee; United States	Ivar Ballangrud; Norway	Frank Stack; Canada

== Records ==
These were the standing world and Olympic records (in minutes) prior to the 1932 Winter Olympics.

World record	17:17.4(*)	(Norway) Armand Carlsen	Davos (SUI)	February 5, 1928
Olympic record	18:04.8	(Finland) Julius Skutnabb	Chamonix (FRA)	January 27, 1924

(*) The record was set in a high altitude venue (more than 1000 metres above sea level) and on naturally frozen ice.

In the later cancelled first heat Alexander Hurd skated 17:41.3 minutes. In the reskated heat he set a time of 17:56.2 minutes, but both in pack-style format.

== Results ==
=== First round ===
Both heats were held on the afternoon of Friday, February 5, 1932.

Heat 1

After this heat a protest was lodged against two of the skaters (Alexander Hurd and Edwin Wedge) for not setting the pace for the agreed numbers of laps.

Place	Name	Time	Qual.
1	Alexander Hurd (CAN)	17:41.3	(Q)
2	Valentine Bialas (USA)		(Q)
3	Ivar Ballangrud (NOR)		(Q)
4	Edwin Wedge (USA)		(Q)
5	Shozo Ishihara (JPN)		
6	Michael Staksrud (NOR)		
7	Ossi Blomqvist (FIN)		
–	Marion McCarthy (CAN)	DNF	
–	Tomeju Uruma (JPN)	DNF	

Heat 2

After this heat again a protest was lodged against a skater (Frank Stack) this time for interference on the home stretch.

Place	Name	Time	Qual.
1	Eddie Schroeder (USA)	17:52.2	(Q)
2	Frank Stack (CAN)		(Q)
3	Irving Jaffee (USA)		(Q)
4	Bernt Evensen (NOR)		(Q)
5	Hans Engnestangen (NOR)		
6	Ingvar Lindberg (SWE)		
7	Tokuo Kitani (JPN)		
–	Yasuo Kawamura (JPN)	DNF	
–	Willy Logan (CAN)	DNF	

After both heats the referee Joseph K. Savage from the United States referred the matter to the three technical delegates. Herbert J. Clarke from Great Britain, Walter Jakobsson from Finland, and Hermann Kleeberg from Germany decided at their meeting to have both heats reskated, and in fairness to all concerned all the original starters were allowed to compete the following morning.

Both reskated heats were held on the morning of Saturday, February 6, 1932.

Heat 1

Place	Name	Time	Qual.
1	Alexander Hurd (CAN)	17:56.2	Q
2	Ivar Ballangrud (NOR)		Q
3	Valentine Bialas (USA)		Q
4	Edwin Wedge (USA)		Q
5	Ossi Blomqvist (FIN)		
6	Michael Staksrud (NOR)		
–	Shozo Ishihara (JPN)	DNF	
–	Marion McCarthy (CAN)	DNF	
–	Tomeju Uruma (JPN)	DNF	

Heat 2

Place	Name	Time	Qual.
1	Irving Jaffee (USA)	18:05.4	Q
2	Frank Stack (CAN)		Q
3	Bernt Evensen (NOR)		Q
3	Eddie Schroeder (USA)		Q
5	Willy Logan (CAN)		
6	Hans Engnestangen (NOR)		
–	Ingvar Lindberg (SWE)	DNF	
–	Tokuo Kitani (JPN)	DNF	
–	Yasuo Kawamura (JPN)	DNF	

Note that exactly the same eight skaters qualified in the reskated heats.

=== Final ===
Place	Name	Time
1	Irving Jaffee (USA)	19:13.6
2	Ivar Ballangrud (NOR)	5 m behind
3	Frank Stack (CAN)	6 m behind
4	Edwin Wedge (USA)	
5	Valentine Bialas (USA)	
6	Bernt Evensen (NOR)	
7	Alexander Hurd (CAN)	
8	Eddie Schroeder (USA)	
