= Speed skating at the 1932 Winter Olympics – Men's 500 metres =

Speed skating at the Olympics

Men's 500 metres speed skating at the III Olympic Winter Games
- Pictogram for speed skating
- Venue: James B. Sheffield Olympic Skating Rink
- Date: 4 February 1932
- Competitors: 16 from 4 nations
- Winning time: 43.4

Medalists
1st place, gold medalist(s)		Jack Shea	United States
2nd place, silver medalist(s)		Bernt Evensen	Norway
3rd place, bronze medalist(s)		Alexander Hurd	Canada

The 500 metres speed skating event was part of the speed skating at the 1932 Winter Olympics programme. The competition was held on Thursday, February 4, 1932. Sixteen speed skaters from four nations competed.

Like all other speed skating events at this Olympics the competition was held for the only time in pack-style format, having all competitors skate at the same time.

== Medalists ==
Gold	Silver	Bronze
Jack Shea; United States	Bernt Evensen; Norway	Alexander Hurd; Canada

== Records ==
These were the standing world and Olympic records (in seconds) prior to the 1932 Winter Olympics.

World record	42.6(*)	(Finland) Clas Thunberg	St. Moritz (SUI)	January 13, 1931
Olympic Record	43.4	(Finland) Clas Thunberg	St. Moritz (SUI)	February 13, 1928
Olympic Record	43.4	(Norway) Bernt Evensen	St. Moritz (SUI)	February 13, 1928

(*) The record was set in a high altitude venue (more than 1000 metres above sea level) and on naturally frozen ice.

In the final Jack Shea equalized the Olympic record with 43.4 seconds, but in pack-style format.

== Results ==
=== First round ===
Heat 1

Place	Name	Time	Qual.
1	Frank Stack (CAN)	44.3	Q
2	Jack Shea (USA)		Q
3	Shozo Ishihara (JPN)		
4	Erling Lindboe (NOR)		
5	Yasuo Kawamura (JPN)		

Heat 2

Place	Name	Time	Qual.
1	Bernt Evensen (NOR)	45.3	Q
2	Willy Logan (CAN)		Q
3	Raymond Murray (USA)		
4	Tokuo Kitani (JPN)		
5	Leopold Sylvestre (CAN)		

Heat 3

Place	Name	Time	Qual.
1	Alexander Hurd (CAN)	44.9	Q
2	John Farrell (USA)		Q
3	Allan Potts (USA)		
4	Haakon Pedersen (NOR)		
5	Hans Engnestangen (NOR)		
6	Tomeju Uruma (JPN)		

=== Final ===
Place	Name	Time
1	Jack Shea (USA)	43.4
2	Bernt Evensen (NOR)	5 m behind
3	Alexander Hurd (CAN)	8 m behind
4	Frank Stack (CAN)	
5	Willy Logan (CAN)	
6	John Farrell (USA)	
