= Nordic combined at the 1932 Winter Olympics =

Nordic Combined at the III Olympic Winter Games
- Venue: Lake Placid Olympic Ski Jumping Complex (ski jumping); Lake Placid(cross-country skiing)
- Dates: 10–11 February 1932
- Competitors: 33 from 10 nations
- Winning Score: 446.0

Medalists
1st place, gold medalist(s)		Johan Grøttumsbraaten	Norway
2nd place, silver medalist(s)		Ole Stenen	Norway
3rd place, bronze medalist(s)		Hans Vinjarengen	Norway

At the 1932 Winter Olympics one individual Nordic combined event was contested. It was held on Wednesday, February 10, 1932 (cross-country skiing) and on Thursday, February 11, 1932 (ski jumping). Unlike today the ski jump was the last event held. Both events were also individual medal events.

== Medalists ==
Gold	Silver	Bronze
Johan Grøttumsbråten; Norway	Ole Stenen; Norway	Hans Vinjarengen; Norway

== Results ==
=== Final standings ===
Place	Competitor	Total
1	Johan Grøttumsbråten (NOR)	446.00
2	Ole Stenen (NOR)	436.05
3	Hans Vinjarengen (NOR)	434.60
4	Sverre Kolterud (NOR)	418.70
5	Sven Eriksson (SWE)	402.30
6	Antonín Bartoň (TCH)	397.10
7	Bronisław Czech (POL)	392.00
8	František Šimůnek (TCH)	375.30
9	Rolf Monsen (USA)	369.30
10	Jostein Nordmoe (CAN)	367.56
11	Ján Cífka (TCH)	367.40
12	Ernesto Zardini (ITA)	362.20
13	Jaroslav Feistauer (TCH)	361.30
14	Edward Blood (USA)	361.45
15	Takemitsu Tsubokawa (JPN)	358.90
16	Lloyd Ellingson (USA)	354.20
17	Ingenuino Dallagio (ITA)	346.00
18	Harald Paumgarten (AUT)	342.20
19	Andrzej Marusarz (POL)	335.10
20	Heigoro Kuriyagawa (JPN)	332.80
21	Severino Menardi (ITA)	332.70
22	Cesare Chiogna (SUI)	321.60
23	Fritz Kaufmann (SUI)	320.70
24	Howard Bagguley (CAN)	318.70
25	John Ericksen (USA)	316.30
26	Fritz Steuri (SUI)	315.90
27	Stanisław Marusarz (POL)	308.05
28	Holger Schön (SWE)	300.80
29	Harald Bosio (AUT)	298.70
30	Arthur Gravel (CAN)	278.60
31	Ross Wilson (CAN)	252.80
32	Katsumi Yamada (JPN)	222.20
33	Gregor Höll (AUT)	185.00

== Participating nations ==
A total of 33 Nordic combined skiers from ten nations competed at the Lake Placid Games:

- Austria (3)
- Canada (4)
- Czechoslovakia (4)
- Italy (3)
- Japan (3)
- Norway (4)
- Poland (3)
- Sweden (2)
- Switzerland (3)
- United States (4)
