= Norway at the 1932 Winter Olympics =

- IOC code: NOR
- NOC: Norwegian National Federation of Sports

in Lake Placid
- Competitors: 19 (18 men, 1 woman) in 5 sports
- Flag bearer: Johan Grøttumsbråten (Nordic combined)
- Medals Ranked 2nd: Gold 3 Silver 4 Bronze 3 Total 10

Winter Olympics appearances (overview)
- 1924; 1928; 1932; 1936; 1948; 1952; 1956; 1960; 1964; 1968; 1972; 1976; 1980; 1984; 1988; 1992; 1994; 1998; 2002; 2006; 2010; 2014; 2018; 2022; 2026

Norway competed at the 1932 Winter Olympics in Lake Placid, United States.

== Medalists ==
Medal	Name	Sport	Event
Gold	Sonja Henie	Figure skating	Women's singles
Gold	Johan Grøttumsbråten	Nordic combined	Men's individual
Gold	Birger Ruud	Ski jumping	Men's normal hill
Silver	Ole Stenen	Nordic combined	Men's individual
Silver	Hans Beck	Ski jumping	Men's normal hill
Silver	Bernt Evensen	Speed skating	Men's 500m
Silver	Ivar Ballangrud	Speed skating	Men's 10,000m
Bronze	Arne Rustadstuen	Cross-country skiing	Men's 50 km
Bronze	Hans Vinjarengen	Nordic combined	Men's individual
Bronze	Kaare Wahlberg	Ski jumping	Men's normal hill

== Cross-country skiing ==
Men

Event	Athlete	Race	
Event	Athlete	Time	Rank
18 km	Kristian Hovde	1'32:48	13
18 km	Ole Stenen	1'28:05	8
18 km	Johan Grøttumsbraaten	1'27:15	6
18 km	Arne Rustadstuen	1'27:06	5
50 km	Ole Stenen	DNF	–
50 km	Sigurd Vestad	4'32:40	5
50 km	Ole Hegge	4'32:04	4
50 km	Arne Rustadstuen	4'31:53	3rd place, bronze medalist(s)

== Figure skating ==
Women

Athlete	Event	CF	FS	Places	Points	Final rank
Sonja Henie	Women's singles	1	1	7	2302.5	1st place, gold medalist(s)

== Nordic combined ==
Events:

- 18 km cross-country skiing
- normal hill ski jumping

The cross-country skiing part of this event was combined with the main medal event of cross-country skiing. Those results can be found above in this article in the cross-country skiing section. Some athletes (but not all) entered in both the cross-country skiing and Nordic combined event, their time on the 18 km was used for both events.

The ski jumping (normal hill) event was held separate from the main medal event of ski jumping, results can be found in the table below.

Athlete	Event	Cross-country			Ski Jumping				Total	
Athlete	Event	Time	Points	Rank	Distance 1	Distance 2	Total points	Rank	Points	Rank
Sverre Kolterud	Individual	1'34:36	204.00	7	57.0	55.5	214.6	5	418.60	4
Hans Vinjarengen	Individual	1'32:40	213.00	4	54.0	62.0	221.6	2	434.60	3rd place, bronze medalist(s)
Ole Stenen	Individual	1'28:05	235.75	2	48.0	52.0	200.3	12	436.05	2nd place, silver medalist(s)
Johan Grøttumsbraaten	Individual	1'27:15	240.00	1	51.0	50.0	206.0	6	446.00	1st place, gold medalist(s)

== Ski jumping ==
Athlete	Event	Jump 1			Jump 2			Total	
Athlete	Event	Distance	Points	Rank	Distance	Points	Rank	Points	Rank
Sigmund Ruud	Normal hill	63.0	107.2	5	62.5	107.9	8	215.1	7
Kaare Walberg	Normal hill	62.5	108.9	4	64.0	110.6	3	219.5	3rd place, bronze medalist(s)
Birger Ruud	Normal hill	66.5	113.9	2	69.0	114.2	1	228.1	1st place, gold medalist(s)
Hans Beck	Normal hill	71.5	116.5	1	63.5	110.5	4	227.0	2nd place, silver medalist(s)

== Speed skating ==
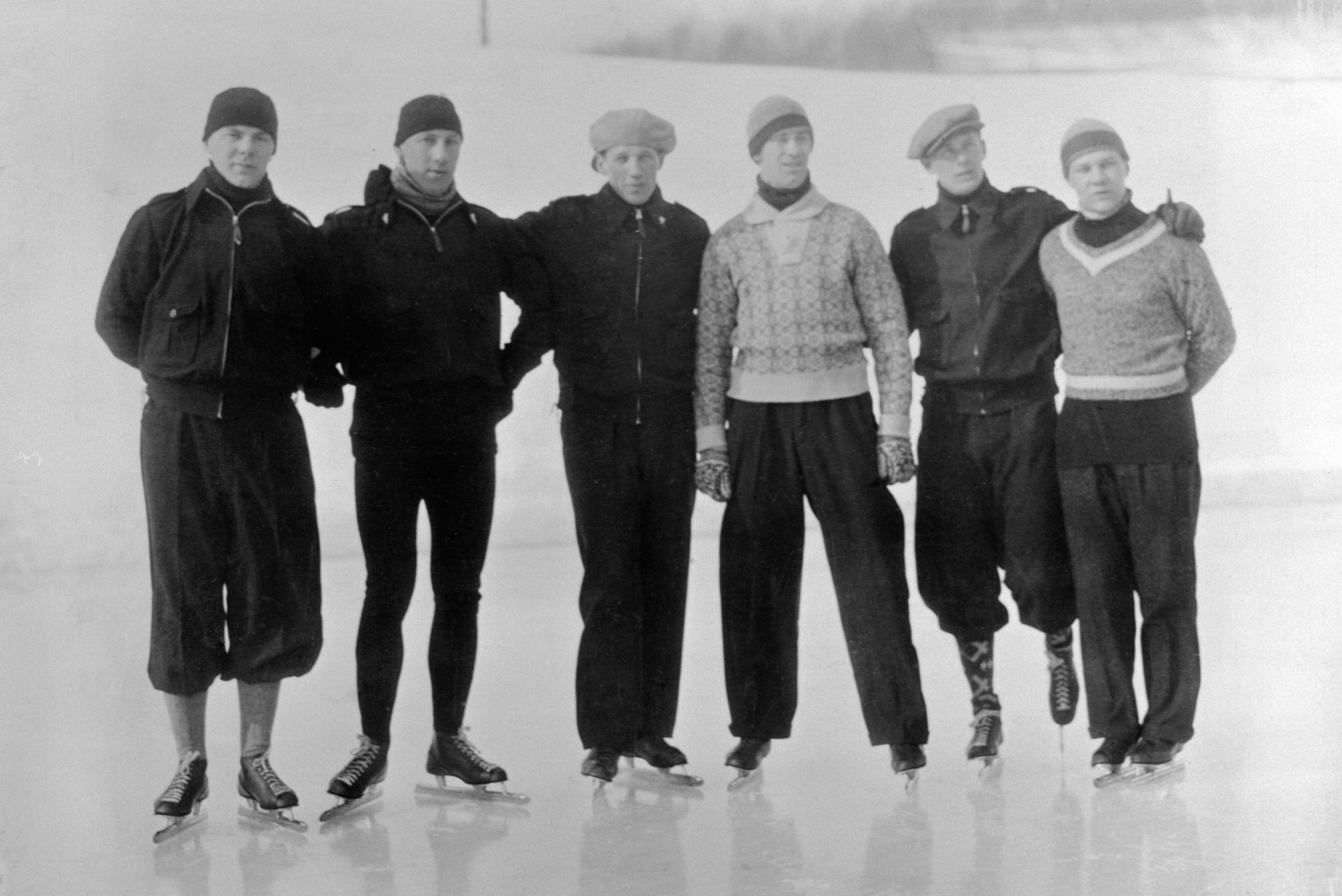
The Norwegian speed skaters that participated. From left: Hans Engnestangen, Ivar Ballangrud, Michael Staksrud, Erling Lindboe, Haakon Pedersen, Bernt Evensen.

Men

Event	Athlete	Heat		Final	
Event	Athlete	Time	Position	Time	Position
500 m	Erling Lindboe	n/a	4	Did not advance	
500 m	Bernt Evensen	45.3	1 Q	n/a	2nd place, silver medalist(s)
500 m	Hans Engnestangen	n/a	5	Did not advance	
500 m	Haakon Pedersen	n/a	4	Did not advance	
1500 m	Hans Engnestangen	n/a	4	Did not advance	
1500 m	Bernt Evensen	n/a	3	Did not advance	
1500 m	Ivar Ballangrud	n/a	3	Did not advance	
1500 m	Michael Staksrud	n/a	3	Did not advance	
5000m	Michael Staksrud	DNF	–	Did not advance	
5000m	Ivar Ballangrud	n/a	3 Q	n/a	5
5000m	Erling Lindboe	n/a	5	Did not advance	
5000m	Bernt Evensen	10:01.4	1 Q	n/a	6
10,000 m	Michael Staksrud	DNF	–	Did not advance	
10,000 m	Ivar Ballangrud	n/a	2 Q	n/a	2nd place, silver medalist(s)
10,000 m	Hans Engnestangen	n/a	6	Did not advance	
10,000 m	Bernt Evensen	n/a	3 Q	n/a	6
