= Tokuo =

- Pronunciation: tokɯo (IPA)
- Gender: Male

Origin
- Origin: Japanese
- Meaning: Different meanings depending on the kanji used

Tokuo is a masculine Japanese given name and surname. It may be written:

- With two kanji, the first read Toku (e.g. 徳 "virtue"; 督 "lead"; 篤 "sincere") and the second o
- With three kanji, the first two respectively read To and ku (e.g. 十九 "nineteen"), and the third read o

In given names, o is written with kanji meaning "masculine" or "male" (e.g. 雄, 夫, 男), while in surnames o may be written with a variety of kanji (e.g. 尾 "tail").

Notable people with the given name include:

- Tokuo Yamamoto (山本 徳生; 1905–1994), Japanese painter
- Tokuo Kitani (木谷 徳雄; 1909–1947), Japanese speed skater
- Tokuo Yamashita (山下 徳夫; 1919–2014), Japanese politician
- Tokuo Takahashi (高橋 徳夫; born 1964), better known as Daizen Takahiro, Japanese sumo wrestler

== See also ==
- People with the given name or surname Tokuo on Japanese Wikipedia
