= Speed skating at the 1932 Winter Olympics =

Speed skating at the III Olympic Winter Games
- Pictogram for speed skating
- Venue: James B. Sheffield Olympic Skating Rink
- Date: 4–10 February 1932
- No. of events: 4
- Competitors: 31 from 6 nations

At the 1932 Winter Olympics, four speed skating events were contested. For the only time in the Olympic history, the speed skating were held as pack-style events, having all competitors skate at the same time. Women were allowed to compete in speed skating for the first time in history in a set of demonstration events. The IOC was reluctant to upgrade women’s events to full medal events, although the organizing committee of the Games advocated for the full inclusion of women’s events. The distances for women were 500 m, 1000 m and 1500 m. The pack-style racing would pave the way for short track speed skating, that would debut as a demonstration event at the 1988 Winter Olympics in Calgary before becoming an official Olympic event at the 1992 Winter Olympics in Albertville.

The men's competitions were held on Thursday, February 4, 1932, Friday, February 5, 1932, Saturday, February 6, 1932, and on Monday, February 8, 1932. The women's events were contested from Monday, February 8, 1932 to Wednesday, February 10, 1932.

== Medal summary ==
| Event | Gold | Silver | Bronze |
|---|---|---|---|
| 500 metres | Jack Shea; United States | Bernt Evensen; Norway | Alexander Hurd; Canada |
| 1500 metres | Jack Shea; United States | Alexander Hurd; Canada | Willy Logan; Canada |
| 5000 metres | Irving Jaffee; United States | Eddie Murphy; United States | Willy Logan; Canada |
| 10,000 metres | Irving Jaffee; United States | Ivar Ballangrud; Norway | Frank Stack; Canada |

== Women's events ==
Speed skating events for women were demonstration events at the 1932 Games, so no official medals were awarded. Two nations, the USA and Canada, with 10 competitors entered the competition. Like the men's races that used the mass start racing in heats, the women's races were as well. The official results show the winning time for each event.

| Event | 1st Place | 2nd Place | 3rd Place |
| 500 metres | Jean Wilson; Canada | Elizabeth Dubois; United States | Kit Klein; United States |
| 1000 metres | Elizabeth Dubois; United States | Hattie Donaldson; Canada | Dorothy Franey; United States |
| 1500 metres | Kit Klein; United States | Jean Wilson; Canada | Helen Bina; United States |

== Participating nations ==
Eight speed skaters competed in all four events. A total of 31 male speed skaters from six nations competed at the Lake Placid Games. In addition, ten female speed skaters (five from the United States as well as five from Canada) competed in the women's demonstration events.

- Canada (7)
- Finland (1)
- Japan (4)
- Norway (6)
- Sweden (1)
- United States (12)

== Medal table ==
| Rank | Nation | Gold | Silver | Bronze | Total |
|---|---|---|---|---|---|
| 1 | United States | 4 | 1 | 0 | 5 |
| 2 | Norway | 0 | 2 | 0 | 2 |
| 3 | Canada | 0 | 1 | 4 | 5 |
| Totals (3 entries) | | 4 | 4 | 4 | 12 |
