= Japan at the 1932 Winter Olympics =

- IOC code: JPN
- NOC: Japanese Olympic Committee
- Website: www.joc.or.jp (in Japanese and English)

in Lake Placid
- Competitors: 16 (men) in 5 sports
- Medals: Gold 0 Silver 0 Bronze 0 Total 0

Winter Olympics appearances (overview)
- 1928; 1932; 1936; 1948; 1952; 1956; 1960; 1964; 1968; 1972; 1976; 1980; 1984; 1988; 1992; 1994; 1998; 2002; 2006; 2010; 2014; 2018; 2022; 2026

Japan competed at the 1932 Winter Olympics in Lake Placid, United States.

== Cross-country skiing ==
Men

Event	Athlete	Race	
Event	Athlete	Time	Rank
18 km	Saburo Iwasaki	1'44:07	37
18 km	Takeo Hoshina	1'35:47	17
18 km	Takemitsu Tsubokawa	1'33:15	15
18 km	Heigoro Kuriyagawa	1'31:34	12
50 km	Kinzo Taniguchi	DNF	–
50 km	Heigoro Kuriyagawa	DNF	–
50 km	Saburo Iwasaki	5'21:40	18
50 km	Iwao Ageishi	5'19:31	17

== Figure skating ==
Men

Athlete	Event	CF	FS	Places	Points	Final rank
Ryuichi Obitani	Men's singles	11	12	79	1856.7	12
Kazuyoshi Oimatsu	Men's singles	10	8	67	1978.6	9

== Nordic combined ==
Events:

- 18 km cross-country skiing
- normal hill ski jumping

The cross-country skiing part of this event was combined with the main medal event of cross-country skiing. Those results can be found above in this article in the cross-country skiing section. Some athletes (but not all) entered in both the cross-country skiing and Nordic combined event, their time on the 18 km was used for both events.

The ski jumping (normal hill) event was held separate from the main medal event of ski jumping, results can be found in the table below.

Athlete	Event	Cross-country			Ski Jumping				Total	
Athlete	Event	Time	Points	Rank	Distance 1	Distance 2	Total points	Rank	Points	Rank
Katsumi Yamada	Individual	1'56:03	111.00	29	47.0 (fall)	40.5	111.2	31	222.20	32
Takemitsu Tsubokawa	Individual	1'33:15	210.00	5	35.5	37.0	148.9	27	358.90	15
Heigoro Kuriyagawa	Individual	1'31:34	219.00	3	49.5 (fall)	50.0	113.8	29	332.80	20

== Ski jumping ==
Athlete	Event	Jump 1			Jump 2			Total	
Athlete	Event	Distance	Points	Rank	Distance	Points	Rank	Points	Rank
Katsumi Yamada	Normal hill	57.0	34.0 (fall)	32	51.5	36.0 (fall)	30	70.0	32
Yoichi Takata	Normal hill	37.5	74.1	29	57.0	17.0 (fall)	32	91.1	31
Mitsutake Makita	Normal hill	59.0	97.2	17	59.5	37.0 (fall)	29	134.2	28
Goro Adachi	Normal hill	60.0	102.1	9	66.0	108.6	6	210.7	8

== Speed skating ==
Men

Event	Athlete	Heat		Final	
Event	Athlete	Time	Position	Time	Position
500 m	Yasuo Kawamura	n/a	5	Did not advance	
500 m	Shozo Ishihara	n/a	3	Did not advance	
500 m	Tokuo Kitani	n/a	4	Did not advance	
500 m	Tomeju Uruma	n/a	5	Did not advance	
1500 m	Tomeju Uruma	n/a	6	Did not advance	
1500 m	Shozo Ishihara	n/a	5	Did not advance	
1500 m	Tokuo Kitani	n/a	5	Did not advance	
1500 m	Yasuo Kawamura	n/a	4	Did not advance	
5000m	Tomeju Uruma	DNF	–	Did not advance	
5000m	Shozo Ishihara	DNF	–	Did not advance	
5000m	Tokuo Kitani	DNF	–	Did not advance	
5000m	Yasuo Kawamura	DNF	–	Did not advance	
10,000 m	Tomeju Uruma	DNF	–	Did not advance	
10,000 m	Shozo Ishihara	DNF	–	Did not advance	
10,000 m	Tokuo Kitani	DNF	–	Did not advance	
10,000 m	Yasuo Kawamura	DNF	–	Did not advance	
