= Sweden at the 1932 Winter Olympics =

- IOC code: SWE
- NOC: Swedish Olympic Committee
- Website: www.sok.se (in Swedish and English)

in Lake Placid
- Competitors: 12 (11 men, 1 woman) in 5 sports
- Flag bearer: Sven Selånger (ski jumping)
- Medals Ranked 3rd: Gold 1 Silver 2 Bronze 0 Total 3

Winter Olympics appearances (overview)
- 1924; 1928; 1932; 1936; 1948; 1952; 1956; 1960; 1964; 1968; 1972; 1976; 1980; 1984; 1988; 1992; 1994; 1998; 2002; 2006; 2010; 2014; 2018; 2022; 2026

Sweden participated at the 1932 Winter Olympics in Lake Placid, United States, held between 4 and 13 February 1932. The country's participation in the Games marked its third appearance at the Winter Olympics since its debut in the inaugural 1924 Winter Games.

The Swedish team consisted of 12 athletes who competed across five sports. Skier Sven Selånger was the country's flag-bearer during the opening ceremony. Sweden was third in the overall medal table with three medals including a gold and two silver medals.

== Background ==
Sweden competed in the Olympic Games since the inaugural edition of the Summer Olympics in 1896. The nation hosted the 1912 Summer Olympics at Stockholm. It also competed in the inaugural Winter Olympics held in 1924 in Chamonix, France. Since the nation made its debut in the Winter Olympics in 1924, it has participated in successive Olympic Games. This edition of the Games marked the nation's third appearance at the Winter Games.

The 1932 Winter Olympics in Lake Placid, United States, held between 4 and 13 February 1932. The Swedish delegation consisted of 12 athletes competing across five sports. Skier Sven Selånger was the country's flag-bearer in the Parade of Nations during the opening ceremony.

== Medalists ==
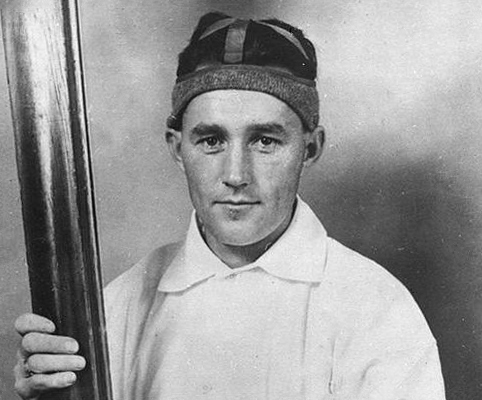
Sven Utterström won the gold medal in Cross-country skiing

Sweden was ranked third in the overall medal table with one gold and two silver medals.

Medal	Name	Sport	Event
Gold	Sven Utterström	Cross-country skiing	Men's 18 km
Silver	Axel Wikström	Cross-country skiing	Men's 18 km
Silver	Gillis Grafström	Figure skating	Men's singles

== Competitors ==
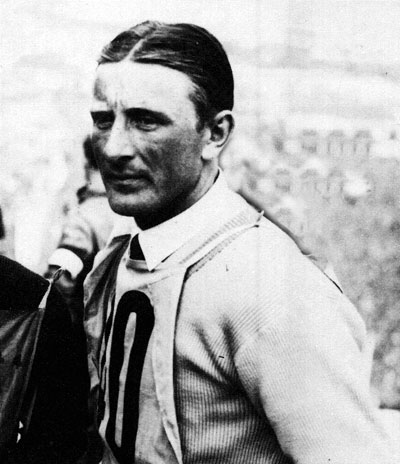
Flag bearer Sven Selånger competed in two sports.

There were 12 athletes including one woman who took part in the medal events across five sports. Flag bearer Sven Selånger and Holger Schön competed in two sports.

Sport	Men	Women	Athletes
Cross-country skiing	6	0	6
Figure skating	1	1	2
Nordic combined	2	0	2
Ski jumping	3	0	3
Speed skating	1	0	1
Total	11	1	12 (Note: The overall count will not match the sum of individual sports as one athlete competed in multiple sports.)

== Cross-country skiing ==
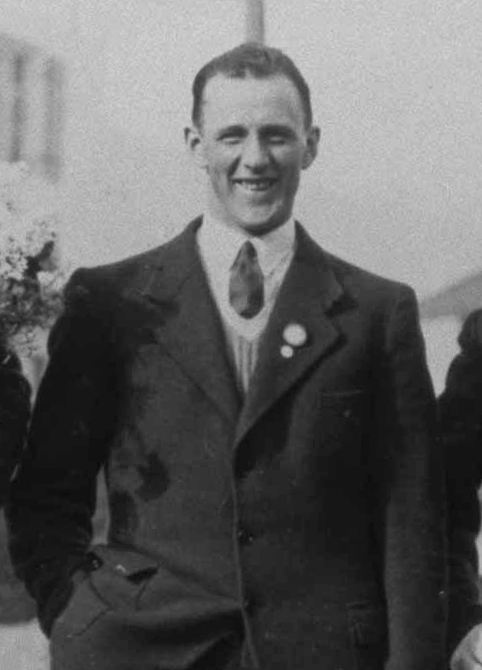
Axel Wikström won a silver medal

Cross-country skiing competitions were held at the James C. Sheffield Speed Skating Oval at Lake Placid. The Swedish team consisted of six men who participated in two events. The country won two of the three medals in the current Winter Games in the cross-country skiing competitions. In the men's 18 km race, Sven Utterström and Axel Wikström won the gold and silver medal respectively. In the 50 km competition, three of the four Swedish athletes were ranked in the top ten, with Utterström ranked the best in sixth place.

Athlete	Event	Time	Rank
Axel Wikström	Men's 18 km	1'25:07	2nd place, silver medalist(s)
Nils Svärd	Men's 18 km	1'29:05	10
Sivert Mattsson	Men's 18 km	1'29:54	11
Sven Utterström	Men's 18 km	1'23:07	1st place, gold medalist(s)
Gustaf Jonsson	Men's 50 km	4'49:52	9
John Lindgren	Men's 50 km	4'47:22	8
Sivert Mattsson	Men's 50 km	DNF	–
Sven Utterström	Men's 50 km	4'33:25	6

== Figure skating ==
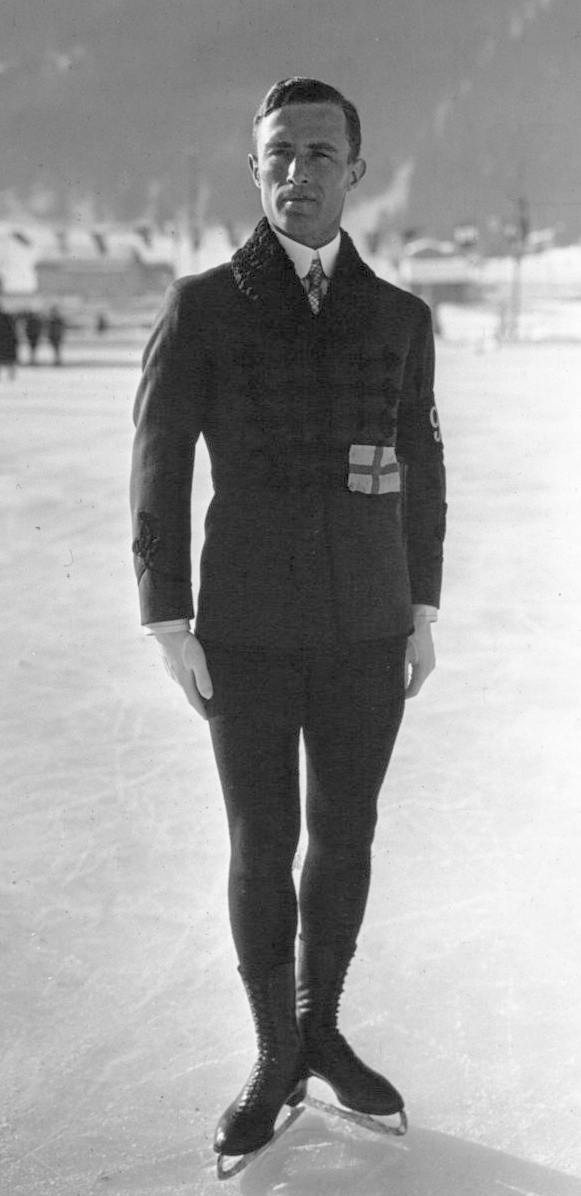
Gillis Grafström won a silver medal in figure skating

Figure skating competitions were held on 8 and 9 February at the Olympic Arena. As per the terms of the competition, the skaters were ranked by every judge from first through last place, which were based on the points awarded with 60% for Compulsory Figures and 40% for Free Skating. The final placement was determined by a Majority Placement rule with the ranks tallied together. Gillis Grafström won the silver medal in the men's competition with a final score of 2514.5 points. Vivi-Anne Hultén, who competed in the women's section, finished fifth in the final classification.

Athlete	Event	CF	FS	Places	Points	Final rank
Gillis Grafström	Men's singles	2	2	13	2514.5	2nd place, silver medalist(s)
Vivi-Anne Hultén	Women's singles	5	4	29	2129.5	5

== Nordic combined ==
The Nordic combined event was held on 10 and 11 February at James C. Sheffield Speed Skating Oval at Lake Placid. The event consisted of ski jumping and 18 km (11 mi) cross-country skiing. The cross-country skiing part of this event was combined with the main medal event of cross-country skiing for those who participated in the event, and the ski jumping (normal hill) event was held separate from the main medal event of ski jumping. Holger Schön and Sven Selånger represented the nation at the event. Selånger narrowly missed out on a medal after finishing fifth in the combined standings. He was ranked third in the ski jumping event, while falling down the order due to his poor ranking in the cross-country race.

Athlete	Event	Cross-country			Ski Jumping				Total	
Athlete	Event	Time	Points	Rank	Distance 1	Distance 2	Total points	Rank	Points	Rank
Holger Schön	Individual	1'59:07	99.00	31	53.5	52.0	201.8	8	300.80	28
Sven Selånger	Individual	1'39:32	181.50	12	57.5	61.5	220.8	3	402.30	5

== Ski jumping ==
Ski jumping event was held on 12 February at Intervale Ski Jump Complex. Sweden had three entrants to the competition. Sven Selånger narrowly missed out on a medal by 0.6 points and finished fourth with 218.9 points.

Athlete	Event	Jump 1			Jump 2			Total	
Athlete	Event	Distance	Points	Rank	Distance	Points	Rank	Points	Rank
Erik Rylander	Normal hill	58.0	103.1	8	58.5	102.9	13	206.0	10
Holger Schön	Normal hill	57.0	97.5	16	61.5	104.3	10	201.8	11
Sven Selånger	Normal hill	65.5	110.3	3	64.0	108.6	6	218.9	4

== Speed skating ==
Speed skating events were held at the James C. Sheffield Speed Skating Oval. Ingvar Lindberg participated in three events in the competition. He did not advance to the final in any of the events.

Athlete	Event	Heat	Final	
Athlete	Event	Position	Time	Position
Ingvar Lindberg	Men's 1,500 m	6	Did not advance	
Ingvar Lindberg	Men's 5,000 m	9	Did not advance	
Ingvar Lindberg	Men's 10,000 m	7	Did not advance	
