= Herbert Flack =

Canadian speed skater

Personal information
- Born: 29 June 1913; Penetanguishene, Ontario, Canada
- Died: 1995 (aged 81–82)

Sport
- Sport: Speed skating

Herbert Flack (29 June 1913 – 1995) was a Canadian speed skater. He competed in the men's 1500 metres event at the 1932 Winter Olympics.
