= Jostein Nordmoe =

Canadian Nordic combined skier

Personal information
- Nationality: Canadian
- Born: 23 January 1895; Målselv, Norway
- Died: 1965 (aged 69–70); Troms, Norway

Sport
- Sport: Nordic combined

Jostein Nordmoe (23 January 1895 – 1965) was a Canadian skier. He competed in the Nordic combined event at the 1932 Winter Olympics.
