= Walther Langer =

Czech figure skater

Personal information
- Nationality: Czech
- Born: 23 August 1899; Přívoz, Austria-Hungary
- Died: 14 September 1983 (aged 84); New York City, New York, US

Sport
- Sport: Figure skating

Walther Langer (23 August 1899 – 14 September 1983) was a Czech figure skater. He competed in the men's singles event at the 1932 Winter Olympics.
