= Howard Bagguley =

Canadian Nordic combined skier

Personal information
- Born: 31 May 1909; Ottawa, Ontario, Canada
- Died: 11 December 1999 (aged 90); Brockville, Ontario, Canada

Sport
- Sport: Nordic combined

Douglas Howard Bagguley (31 May 1909 – 11 December 1999) was a Canadian skier. He competed in the Nordic combined event at the 1932 Winter Olympics.
