= Marion McCarthy (speed skater) =

Canadian speed skater

Personal information
- Born: 10 August 1907; Edmonton, Alberta, Canada
- Died: 21 August 1987 (aged 80); Los Angeles, California, United States

Sport
- Sport: Speed skating

Marion McCarthy (10 August 1907 – 21 August 1987) was a Canadian speed skater. He competed in the men's 10,000 metres event at the 1932 Winter Olympics.
