= Ross Wilson (Nordic skier) =

Canadian Nordic combined skier

Personal information
- Born: 29 December 1909; Toronto, Ontario, Canada
- Died: 25 March 1997 (aged 87); Toronto, Ontario, Canada

Sport
- Sport: Nordic combined

Ross Wilson (29 December 1909 – 25 March 1997) was a Canadian skier. He competed in the Nordic combined event at the 1932 Winter Olympics.
