= Arthur Gravel =

Canadian Nordic combined skier

Personal information
- Born: 4 July 1904; Montreal, Quebec, Canada
- Died: 7 March 1984 (aged 79); Montreal, Quebec, Canada

Sport
- Sport: Nordic combined

Arthur L. Gravel (4 July 1904 – 7 March 1984) was a Canadian skier. He competed in the Nordic combined event at the 1932 Winter Olympics.
