= Figure skating at the 1932 Winter Olympics – Men's singles =

Figure skating at the Olympics

Men's singles at the III Olympic Winter Games
- Venue: Herb Brooks Arena
- Dates: 8–9 February 1932
- Competitors: 12 from 8 nations

Medalists
1st place, gold medalist(s)		Karl Schäfer; Austria
2nd place, silver medalist(s)		Gillis Grafström; Sweden
3rd place, bronze medalist(s)		Montgomery Wilson; Canada

The men's individual skating event was held as part of the figure skating at the 1932 Winter Olympics. It was the fifth appearance of the event, which had previously been held twice at the Summer Olympics in 1908 and 1920 as well as at the Winter Games in 1924 and 1928. The competition was held on Monday 8 February and on Tuesday 9 February 1932. Twelve figure skaters from eight nations competed.

== Results ==
After three consecutive wins Gillis Grafström finished in second place; making him the most successful Olympic figure skater ever. The Austrian Karl Schäfer was able to beat the Swedish champion and went on to defend his title in 1936.

Rank	Name	Nation	CF	FS	Total points	Places
1	Karl Schäfer	Austria	1	1	2602.0	9
2	Gillis Grafström	Sweden	2	2	2514.5	13
3	Montgomery Wilson	Canada	3	3	2448.3	24
4	Marcus Nikkanen	Finland	4	4	2420.1	28
5	Ernst Baier	Germany	6	5	2334.8	35
6	Roger Turner	United States	5	6	2297.6	40
7	J. Lester Madden	United States	8	7	2049.6	52
8	Gail Borden	United States	7	9	2110.8	54
9	Kazuyoshi Oimatsu	Japan	10	8	1978.6	67
10	Walther Langer	Czechoslovakia	9	11	1964.3	70
11	William Nagle	United States	12	10	1884.8	77
12	Ryuichi Obitani	Japan	11	12	1856.7	79

Referee:

- (United States) Joel B. Liberman

Judges:

- (Norway) Yngvar Bryn
- (United Kingdom) Herbert J. Clarke
- (Austria) Hans Grünauer
- (Finland) Walter Jakobsson
- (Canada) J. Cecil McDougall
- (Hungary) Jenő Minnich
- (United States) Charles M. Rotch
