= Erling Lindboe =

Norwegian speed skater

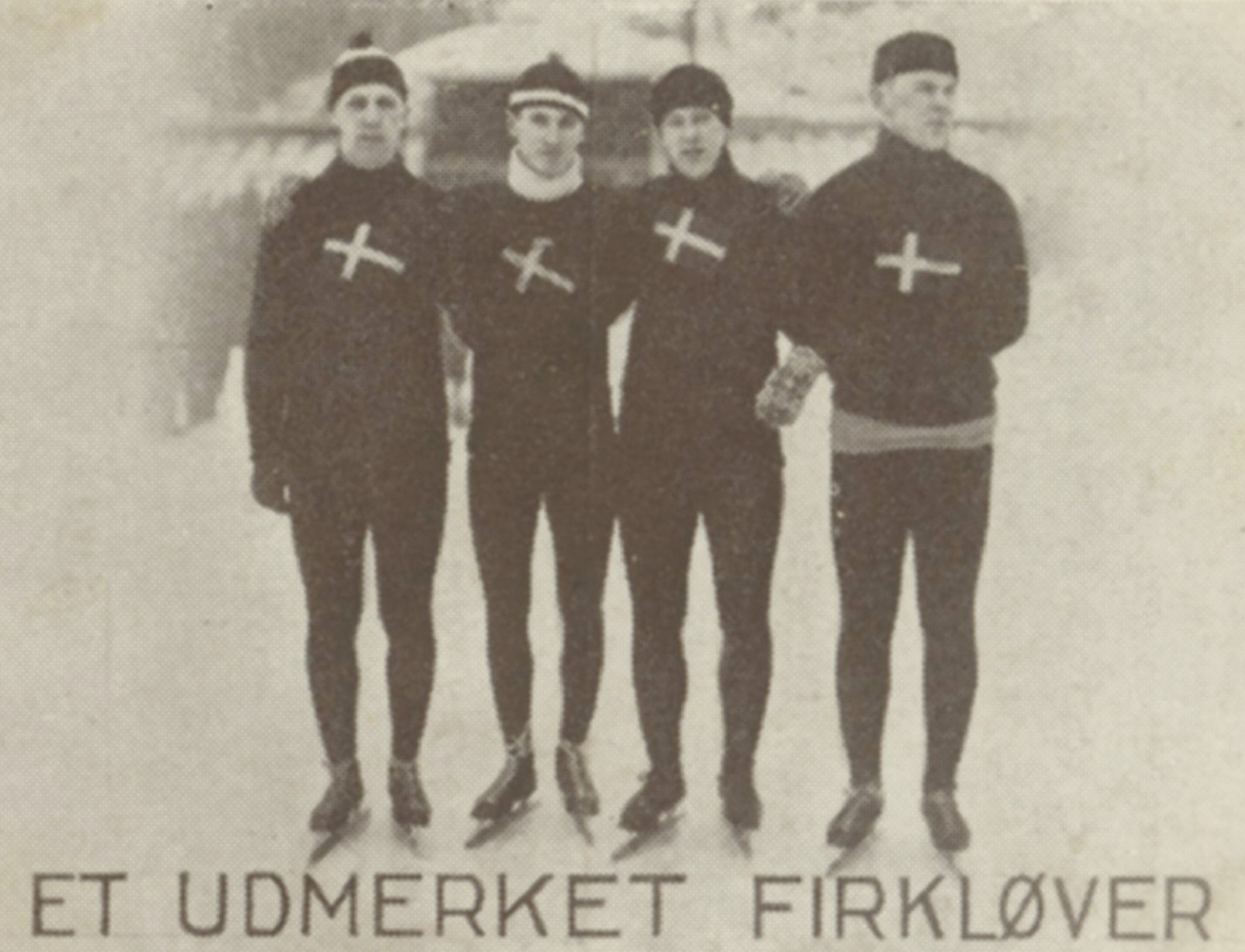
- Collectorcard from 1930 with Lindboe to the far right.

Personal information
- Nationality: Norwegian
- Born: 18 September 1910; Trondheim
- Died: 24 September 1973 (aged 63)

Sport
- Sport: Speed skating

Erling Lindboe (18 September 1910 – 24 December 1973) was a Norwegian speed skater.

He competed at the 1932 Winter Olympics in Lake Placid, in the 500 metres and the 5000 metres.
