= Harry Smyth =

Canadian speed skater (1910–1992)

Charles Henry "Harry" Smyth (February 21, 1910 - September 20, 1992) was a Canadian speed skater who competed in the 1932 Winter Olympics, finishing 8th in the 5000m.

He was born in Moncton, New Brunswick.

Notable achievements:

- Winner of the World Championship in 1926;
- Won every race in which he competed in 1926, including the NB, Maritime, Canadian, and World Championship titles;
- Winner of Canadian champion in 1926, ’27 and ’28;
- Winner of the City Championship of Moncton in 1922 and ’43;
- Won NB titles in 1922 (12 and under); 1926 (16 and under); 1930, ’33 (Seniors);
- Winner of the Maritime Speed Skating title in 1925, ’26 and ’43;
- Won the NB and Quebec titles in 1930;
- Inducted into the New Brunswick Sports Hall of Fame in 1973.
