= Yasuo Kawamura =

Japanese speed skater (1908–1997)

Yasuo Kawamura (Japanese: 河村 泰男; 7 May 1908 – 13 October 1997) was a Japanese speed skater who competed in the 1932 and 1936 Winter Olympics.

In 1932 he participated in the 500 metres competition, in the 1500 metres event, in the 5000 metres competition, and in the 10000 metres event, but was eliminated in the heats in all four contests.

Four years later he finished 28th in the 1500 metres competition.

== Early life ==
Kawamura was born in Ogoto, Ōtsu, Shiga before moving to Korea and eventually Manchuria with his family. Here, he started speed skating.

== Death ==
Kawamure died on 13 October 1997 in Sapporo, Hokkaido.

== Best times ==
- 500m – 45.8 (1936)
- 1500m – 2:28.2 (1936)
- 5000m – 9:22.6 (1932)
- 10000m – 19:52.5 (1935)
