= Tomeju Uruma =

Japanese speed skater (1902–1999)

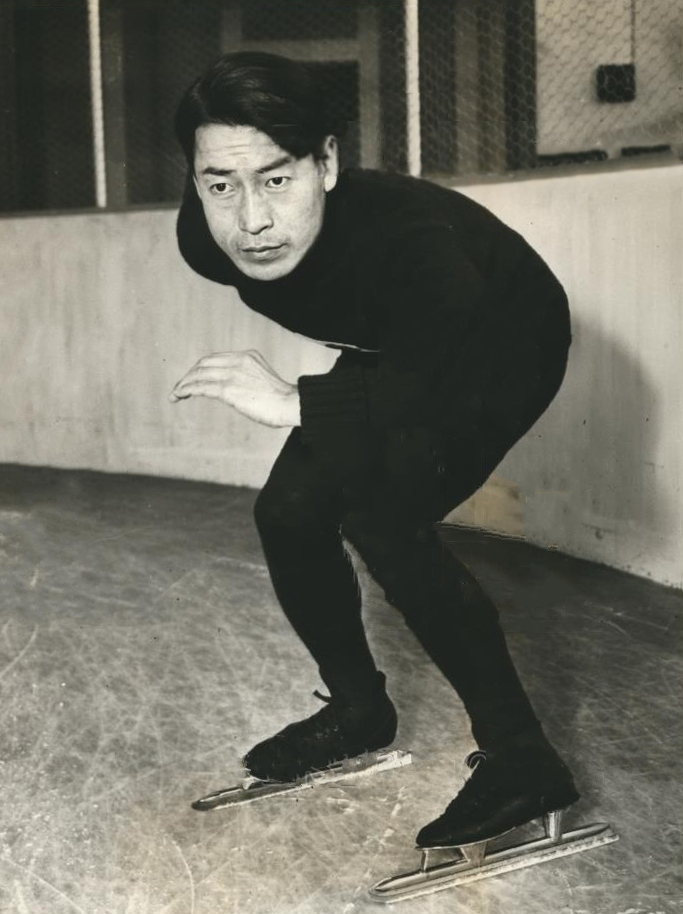
- Uruma at the 1932 Olympics

Personal information
- Born: 9 December 1902 Okaya, Japan
- Died: 26 January 1999 (aged 96)

Sport
- Country: Japan
- Sport: Speed skating
- Club: Okaya Skating Association

Tomeju Uruma (潤間留十, Uruma Tomeju; 9 December 1902 – 26 January 1999) was a Japanese speed skater who competed in the 1932 Winter Olympics. He was eliminated in the heats of the 500 m, 1500 m, 5000 m, and 10000 m events.
