= Herbert Taylor (speed skater) =

American speed skater

Herbert G. Taylor (December 20, 1906 – January 1981) was an American speed skater who competed in the 1932 Winter Olympics.

In 1932 he finished fourth in the 5000 metres event and sixth in the 1500 metres competition.
