= Raymond Murray (speed skater) =

American speed skater

Raymond V. Murray (born June 14, 1910, date of death 1961) was an American speed skater who competed in the 1932 Winter Olympics.

He won the US intermediate speed skating championship in 1929. In 1930 he won the New York indoor senior crown.

In 1932 he finished fifth in the 1500 metres event. He also participated in the 500 metres competition but was eliminated in the heats.
