= Shozo Ishihara =

Japanese speed skater (1910–1993)

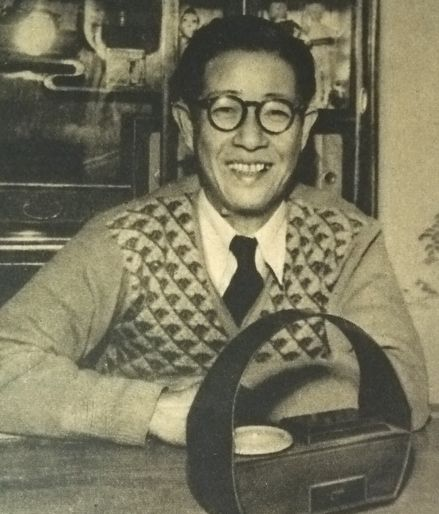
- Ishihara in March 1955

Personal information
- Born: 10 August 1910 Tochigi Prefecture, Japan
- Died: 19 July 1993 (aged 82)

Sport
- Country: Japan
- Sport: Speed skating

Shozo Ishihara (Japanese: 石原省三; 10 August 1910 – 19 July 1993) was a Japanese speed skater who competed in the 1932 and 1936 Winter Olympics.

He was born in the Tochigi Prefecture.

In 1932 he participated in the 500 metres competition, in the 1500 metres event, in the 5000 metres competition, and in the 10000 metres event, but was eliminated in the heats in all four contests.

Four years later he finished fourth in the 500 metres competition and 19th in the 1500 metres event.
