= Haakon Pedersen =

Norwegian speed skater

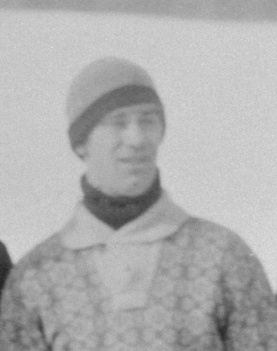

Personal information
- Born: 9 October 1906
- Died: 7 September 1991

Sport
- Country: Norway
- Sport: speed skating

Haakon Pedersen (9 October 1906 – 7 September 1991) was a Norwegian speed skater who competed in the 1928 Winter Olympics and in the 1932 Winter Olympics.

In 1928 he finished fifth in the 500 metres competition.

Four years later he competed in the 500 metres event again but was eliminated in the heats.
