= Saburo Iwasaki =

Japanese cross-country skier (1904–1982)

Personal information
- Nationality: Japanese
- Born: 11 October 1904; Niigata, Japan
- Died: 10 November 1982 (aged 78)

Sport
- Sport: Cross-country skiing

Saburo Iwasaki (11 October 1904 – 10 November 1982) was a Japanese cross-country skier. He competed in the men's 18 kilometre event at the 1932 Winter Olympics. From 1956 to 1960, Iwasaki was the managing director of the Ski Association of Japan, and later became the vice-chair of the organisation.
