= Lloyd Guenther =

American speed skater

Personal information
- Born: December 14, 1906 Detroit, Michigan, United States
- Died: 18 October 1995 (aged 88) Hendersonville, North Carolina, United States

Sport
- Sport: Speed skating

Lloyd Guenther (December 14, 1906 – October 18, 1995) was an American speed skater. He competed in the men's 1500 metres event at the 1932 Winter Olympics.
