= Edwin Wedge =

American speed skater

Edwin Wedge (January 28, 1911 – December 26, 1994) was an American speed skater who competed in the 1932 Winter Olympics.

In 1932, he finished fourth in the 10000 metres event.
