= Lloyd Ellingson =

American Nordic combined skier

Personal information
- Born: February 23, 1908 Colfax, Wisconsin, United States
- Died: March 28, 1946 (aged 38) Spring Valley, Wisconsin, United States

Sport
- Sport: Nordic combined

Lloyd Ellingson (February 23, 1908 – March 28, 1946) was an American skier. He competed in the Nordic combined event at the 1932 Winter Olympics. He was killed in a plane crash in 1946.
