= Carl Springer =

American speed skater

Personal information
- Born: November 10, 1910 Brooklyn, New York, United States
- Died: 2 September 1980 (aged 69) Glendale, California, United States

Sport
- Sport: Speed skating

Carl Springer (November 10, 1910 – September 2, 1980) was an American speed skater. He competed in the men's 5000 metres event at the 1932 Winter Olympics.
