= John Ericksen =

American Nordic combined skier

Personal information
- Nationality: American
- Born: August 30, 1903 Arendal, Norway
- Died: October 17, 1985 (aged 82) Hernando, Florida, United States

Sport
- Sport: Nordic combined

John Ericksen (August 30, 1903 – October 17, 1985) was an American skier. He competed in the Nordic combined event at the 1932 Winter Olympics.
