= Willy Logan =

Canadian speed skater

Olympic medal record

Men's speed skating

Representing Canada
Bronze medal – third place	1932 Lake Placid	1500 m
Bronze medal – third place	1932 Lake Placid	5000 m

William Frederick Logan (March 15, 1907 – November 6, 1955) was a Canadian speed skater who competed in the 1928 Winter Olympics and in the 1932 Winter Olympics.

He was born in Saint John, New Brunswick.

In 1928 he finished eleventh in the 500 metres event, 21st in the 1500 metres competition and 29th in the 5000 metres event.

Four years later he won the bronze medal in the 1500 metres event as well as in the 5000 metres competition. In the 500 metres event he finished fifth. He also participated in the 10000 metres competition but was eliminated in the heats.

Personal Bests: 500 - 45.2 (1928); 1500 - 2.35.6 (1928); 5000 - 9.58.3 (1928).
