= Takemitsu Tsubokawa =

Japanese cross-country skier (1909–1940)

Personal information
- Nationality: Japanese
- Born: 1909; Hokkaido, Japan
- Died: 19 December 1940 (aged 30–31)

Sport
- Sport: Cross-country skiing

Takemitsu Tsubokawa (1909 – 19 December 1940) was a Japanese cross-country skier. He competed in the men's 18 kilometre event at the 1932 Winter Olympics.
