= Eddie Murphy (speed skater) =

American speed skater

Olympic medal record

Representing the United States

Men's speed skating

Olympic Games
Silver medal – second place	1932 Lake Placid	5000 m

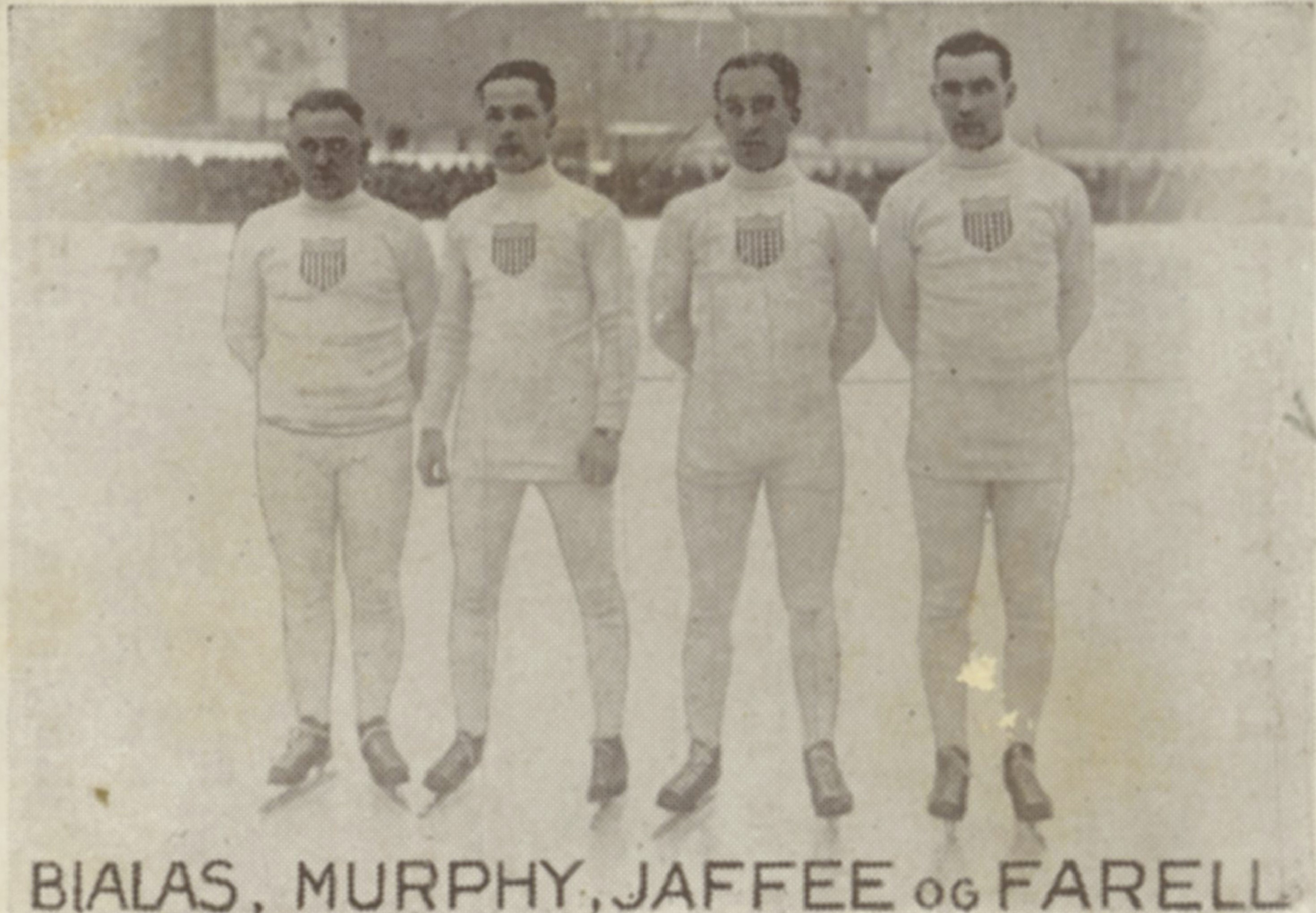
Bialas, Murphy, Jaffee o Farrell - The 4 American skaters (14462814982) (cropped).jpg

Edward S. Murphy (February 1, 1905 in La Crosse, Wisconsin – September 20, 1973 in Bellwood, Illinois) was an American speed skater who competed in the 1928 and 1932 Winter Olympics.

In 1928 he finished fifth in the 1500 metres event, tenth in the 500 metres competition, and 14th in the 5000 metres event.

Four years later he won the silver medal in the 5000 metres competition.
