= Frank Stack (speed skater) =

Canadian speed skater

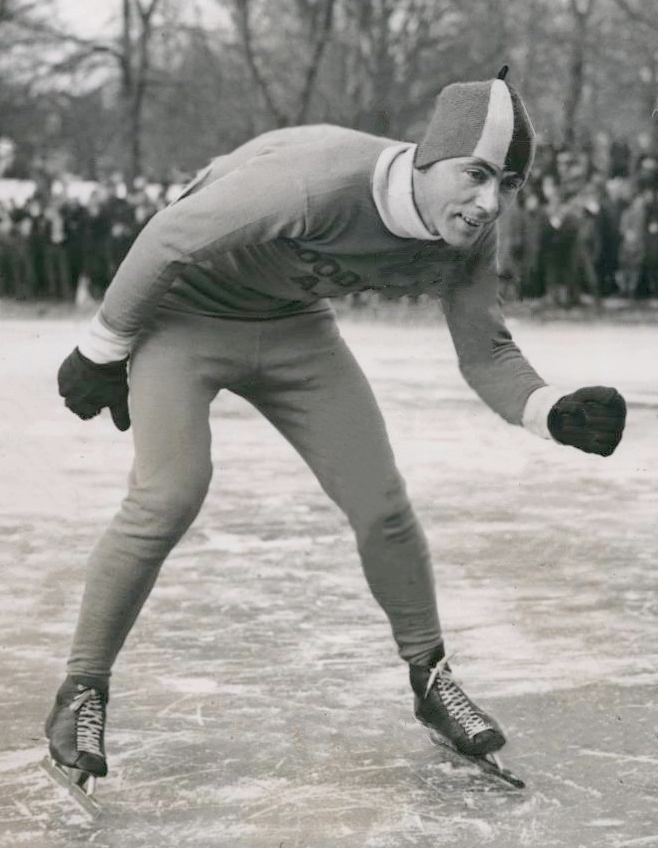
- Frank Stack in 1936

Personal information
- Born: January 1, 1906 Winnipeg, Manitoba, Canada
- Died: January 25, 1987 (aged 81) Winnipeg, Manitoba, Canada

Sport
- Sport: Speed skating

Achievements and titles
- Personal bests: 500 m – 43.6 (1948); 1500 m – 2:23.2 (1952); 5000 m – 9:04.2 (1934); 10000 m – 19:00.0 (1952)
Medal record
Representing Canada
Olympic Games
Bronze medal – third place	1932 Lake Placid	10000 m

Frank Stack (January 1, 1906 – January 25, 1987) was a Canadian speed skater. He competed at the 1932, 1948 and 1952 Olympics and won a bronze medal in the 10000 m in 1932, placing fourth in the 500 m and 1500 m and seventh in the 5000 m events. He missed the 1936 Games due to lack of funds to travel to Berlin.

Stack took up skating at the age of 13, following his father Jack, who was also a competitive speed skater. Frank was the Western Canadian Junior Champion in 1919–1923 and senior champion in 1924–1929. In 1931, 1932 and 1938 he won North American Indoor Championships. He semi-retired in 1954, but returned to competitions in 1966, aged 60, and had five podium finishes at the Canadian Indoor Championships. While competing Stack worked as a speed skating coach and prepared the national team to the 1952 and 1960 Winter Olympics. In 1965 he was inducted into the Canadian Speed Skating Hall of Fame as one of five charter members. He became member of the Canada Sports Hall of Fame in 1974 and of the Manitoba Sports Hall of Fame and Museum in 1981. Stack Street in Winnipeg is named in his honor.
