= Tokuo Yamamoto =

Japanese painter

- Born: 1905; Iwakuni, Japan
- Died: 1994 (aged 88–89); Iwakuni, Japan
- Occupation: Painter

Tokuo Yamamoto (1905 – 1994) was a Japanese painter. His work was part of the painting event in the art competition at the 1936 Summer Olympics.
