= Katsumi Yamada =

Japanese ski jumper

Personal information
- Nationality: Japanese
- Born: 6 June 1905; Sapporo, Japan
- Died: 1970 (aged 64–65)

Sport
- Sport: Ski jumping

Katsumi Yamada (6 June 1905 – 1970) was a Japanese ski jumper. He competed in the individual event at the 1932 Winter Olympics.
