= Tokuo Kitani =

Japanese speed skater (1909–1947)

Tokuo Kitani (Japanese: 木谷 徳雄; 15 February 1909 – January 1947) was a Japanese speed skater who competed in the 1932 Winter Olympics.

In 1932 he participated in the 500 metres competition, in the 1500 metres event, in the 5000 metres competition, and in the 10000 metres event, but was eliminated in the heats in all four contests.
