= Holger Schön =

Swedish ski jumper (1910–1980)

Personal information
- Nationality: Swedish
- Born: 30 March 1910 Stockholm, Sweden
- Died: 25 March 1980 (aged 69) Stockholm, Sweden

Sport
- Sport: Ski jumping

Holger Schön (30 March 1910 – 25 March 1980) was a Swedish ski jumper. He competed in the individual event at the 1932 Winter Olympics.

Schön represented Djurgårdens IF.
