= Heigoro Kuriyagawa =

Japanese cross-country skier

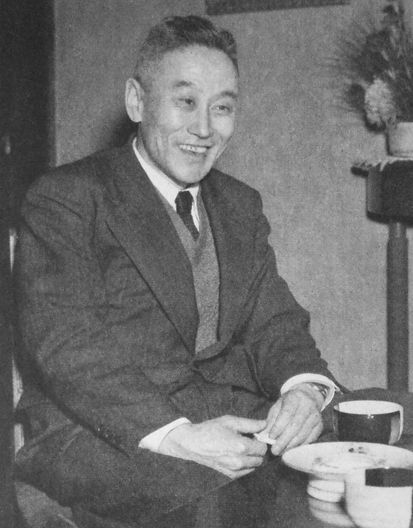
- Heigoro Kuriyagawa in 1955

Personal information
- Nationality: Japanese
- Born: 4 October 1908; Hokkaido, Japan

Sport
- Sport: Cross-country skiing

Heigoro Kuriyagawa (born 4 October 1908, date of death unknown) was a Japanese cross-country skier. He competed in the men's 18 kilometre event at the 1932 Winter Olympics.
