= Ingvar Lindberg =

Swedish speed skater

Personal information
- Nationality: Swedish
- Born: 12 June 1911; Eskilstuna, Sweden
- Died: 17 April 1970 (aged 58); Eskilstuna, Sweden

Sport
- Sport: Speed skating

Ingvar Lindberg (12 June 1911 – 17 April 1970) was a Swedish speed skater. He competed in three events at the 1932 Winter Olympics.
