= Hans Beck (ski jumper) =

Norwegian ski jumper

Medal record

Men's ski jumping

Representing Norway

Olympic Games
Silver medal – second place	1932 Lake Placid	Large hill

World Championships
Silver medal – second place	1932 Lake Placid	Large hill

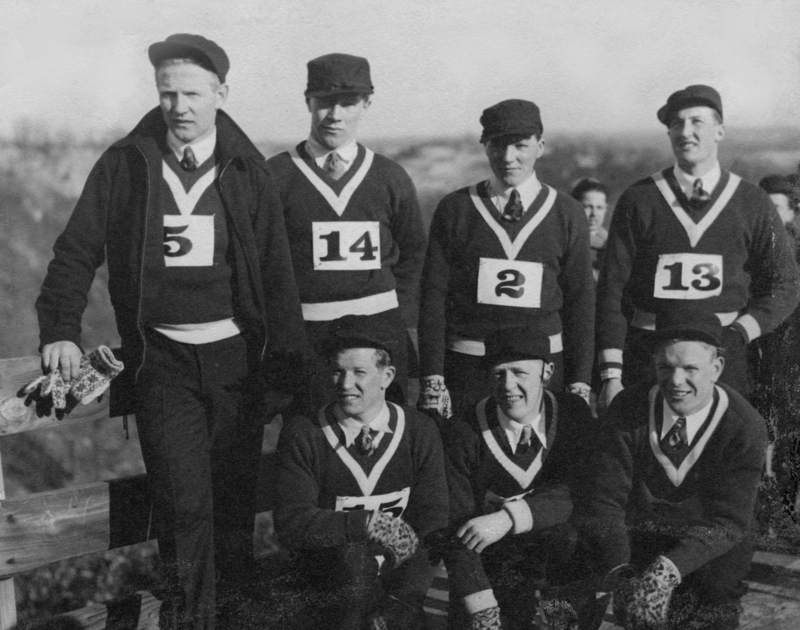

Hans Beck (25 April 1911 – 11 April 1996) was a Norwegian ski jumper who won a silver medal in the large hill individual event at the 1932 Winter Olympics in Lake Placid, New York. Having been in the lead after the first round, he was overcome by Birger Ruud, who hailed from the same city, in the second round.

Born in Kongsberg, he represented Kongsberg IF. He married in 1949, and had two children. After his active career he worked as a seller of sports gear.
