= Jack Shea (speed skater) =

American speed skater

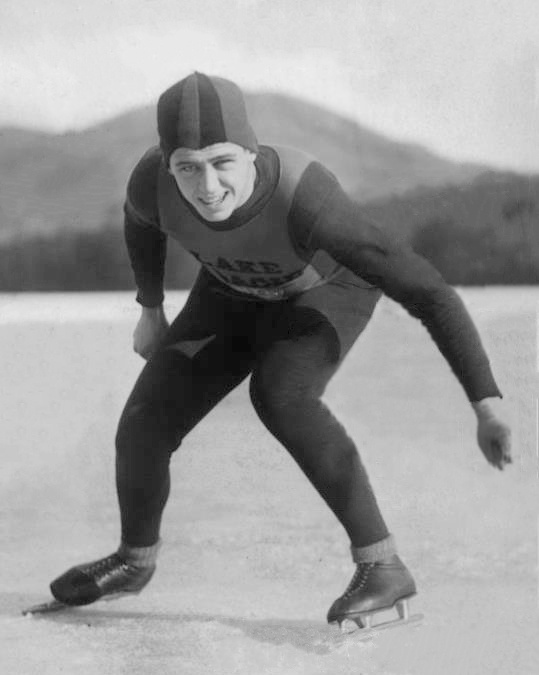
- Jack Shea in 1929

Personal information
- Born: September 7, 1910 Lake Placid, New York, U.S.
- Died: January 22, 2002 (aged 91) Saranac Lake, New York, U.S.

Sport
- Sport: Speed skating
- Club: Dartmouth Big Green, Hanover

Achievements and titles
- Personal bests: 500 m – 45.0 (1931); 1500 m – 2:25.2 (1931)
Medal record
Representing the United States
Olympic Games
Gold medal – first place	1932 Lake Placid	500 m
Gold medal – first place	1932 Lake Placid	1500 m

John Amos Shea (September 7, 1910 – January 22, 2002), better known as Jack Shea or The Chief, was an American double-gold medalist in speed skating at the 1932 Winter Olympics. He was the first American to win two gold medals at one Winter Olympics, and was the patriarch of the first family with three generations of Winter Olympians. Along with his compatriot Irving Jaffee, he was the most successful athlete at the 1932 Winter Olympics.

== Career ==
Shea won gold medals in the 500-meter and 1500-meter events at the III Olympic Winter Games in his hometown of Lake Placid, New York. He also recited the Olympic Oath at the Games' opening ceremonies, which were presided over by then-New York State Governor Franklin D. Roosevelt. Shea chose not to defend his Olympic titles at the 1936 Winter Olympics in Garmisch-Partenkirchen, at the request of a Lake Placid rabbi who asked him not to compete in Hitler's Germany.

Decades later, Shea played a major role in returning the Winter Olympics to Lake Placid in 1980 as a member of the 1980 Olympic Organizing Committee. Afterward, he served as Vice Chairman of the Olympic Regional Development Authority, the organization that manages the venues used in the 1980 Games.

His son, Jim Shea Sr., was a 1964 Olympian in Nordic Combined and Cross Country Skiing; his grandson, Jim Shea Jr. was the gold medalist in men's Skeleton Sledding at the 2002 Winter Olympics in Salt Lake City. In the lead-up to the Salt Lake Games, Jack participated in the Olympic torch relay, lighting a cauldron at the speed skating oval in Lake Placid where he had won his medals in 1932. Shea was killed in a head-on automobile collision by a drunk driver 17 days before he was to watch his grandson participate in the Salt Lake Games. In 2005, the 1932 Arena in Lake Placid was renamed in his honor.

== Outside of sports ==
Shea attended Lake Placid High School, graduated from Dartmouth College and briefly attended Albany Law School, leaving to support his family during the Great Depression in a series of jobs in Lake Placid. From 1958 to 1974, he was town Justice, and from 1974 until his retirement in 1983 he was the Supervisor of the town of North Elba.

== See also ==
- List of Olympic medalist families
