= Ole Stenen =

Norwegian Nordic skier

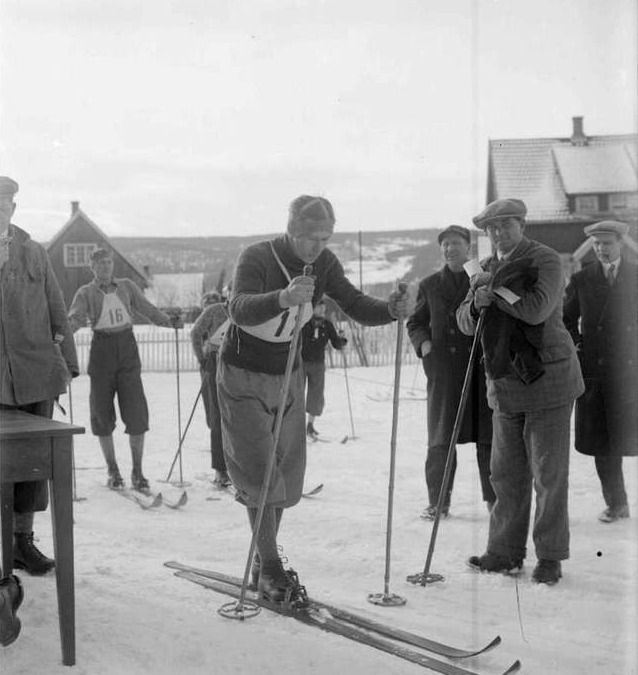

Medal record

Representing Norway

Men's cross-country skiing

World Championships
Gold medal – first place	1931 Oberhof	50 km

Men's Nordic combined

Olympic Games
Silver medal – second place	1932 Lake Placid	Individual

World Championships
Silver medal – second place	1929 Zakopane	Individual

Ole Stenen (29 August 1903 in Øyer Municipality, Gudbrandsdal – 23 April 1975) was a Norwegian Nordic skier who competed in Nordic combined and cross-country skiing in the 1920s and early 1930s.

He was born in Øyer Municipality and represented the club Øyer IL. He died in April 1975 in Oslo.

He won a silver medal in Nordic combined at the 1932 Winter Olympics in Lake Placid, New York. In additionally, victory in the 50 km cross-country event at both the 1931 World Ski Championships and the 1931 Holmenkollen ski festival. He also won a silver medal in the Nordic combined at the 1929 World Ski Championships and finished fourth at the 1934 World Ski Championships. Due to these achievement, Stenen shared the Holmenkollen medal in 1931 with fellow Norwegian Hans Vinjarengen, a Nordic combined athlete.

He participated in the demonstration event, military patrol (precursor to biathlon), in the 1928 Winter Olympics.

== Cross-country skiing results ==
All results are sourced from the International Ski Federation (FIS).

=== Olympic Games ===
Year	Age	18 km	50 km
1932	28	8	DNF

=== World Championships ===
- 4 medals – (1 gold, 1 silver, 2 bronze)

Year	Age	17 km	18 km	50 km	4 × 10 km relay
1929	25	—	—N/a	9	—N/a
1930	26	15	—N/a	—	—N/a
1931	27	—N/a	8	Gold	—N/a
1934	30	—N/a	29	7	—
