= Hans Vinjarengen =

Norwegian Nordic combined skier (1905–1984)

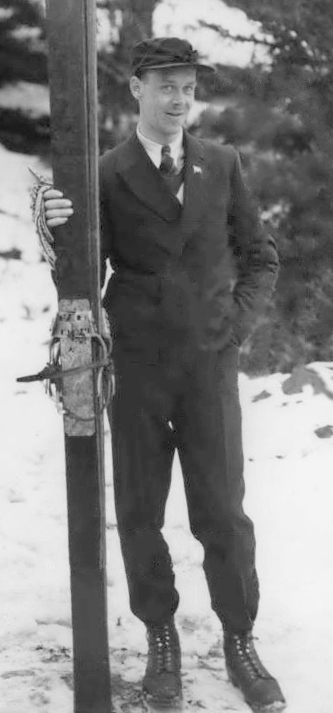
- Vinjarengen in 1932

Personal information
- Born: 20 August 1905 Nordre Land, Norway
- Died: 1 February 1984 (aged 78) Oslo, Norway
- Height: 183 cm (6 ft 0 in)

Sport
- Sport: Nordic combined
- Club: Nordre Land IL
Medal record
Representing Norway
Olympic Games
Silver medal – second place	1928 St. Moritz	Individual
Bronze medal – third place	1932 Lake Placid	Individual
World championships
Gold medal – first place	1929 Zakopane	Individual
Gold medal – first place	1930 Oslo	Individual
Bronze medal – third place	1934 Sollefteå	Individual
Bronze medal – third place	1938 Lahti	Individual

Hans Vinjarengen (20 August 1905 – 1 February 1984) was a Nordic combined skier from Norway. He won a silver medal at the 1928 Winter Olympics in St. Moritz and a bronze at the 1932 Winter Olympics in Lake Placid, New York. In addition, he won gold medals at the 1929 and 1930 FIS Nordic World Ski Championships and bronzes in 1934 and 1938.

Vinjarengen won the Holmenkollen ski festival's Nordic combined event twice (1930 and 1932). In 1931, he shared the Holmenkollen medal with fellow Norwegian Ole Stensen, a cross-country skier. Vinjarengen lived most of his life in Oslo, where he worked as a lorry driver, but he represented his childhood club from Nordre Land.
