= Kaare Walberg =

Norwegian ski jumper

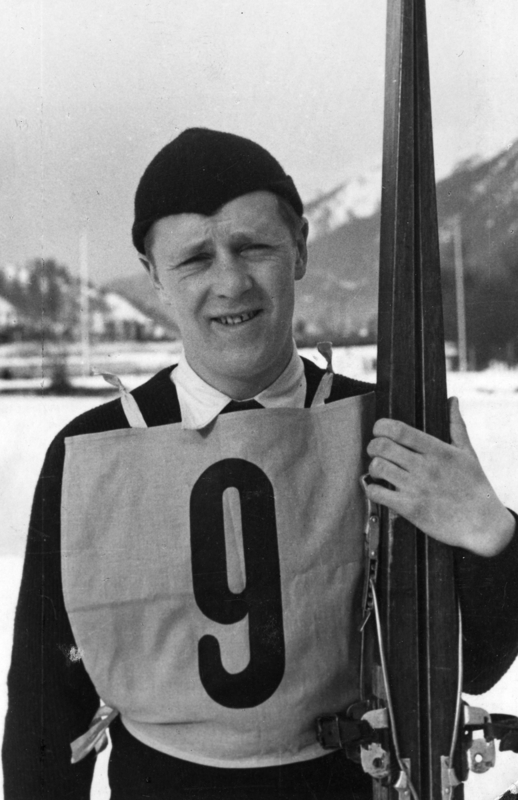

Medal record

Men's ski jumping

Representing Norway

Olympic Games
Bronze medal – third place	1932 Lake Placid	Individual Large Hill

World Championships
Bronze medal – third place	1932 Lake Placid	Individual Large Hill

Kaare Walberg (July 3, 1912 – February 29, 1988) was a Norwegian ski jumper who won a bronze medal in the Individual Large Hill at the 1932 Winter Olympics in Lake Placid, New York. At the 1936 Winter Olympics in Garmisch-Partenkirchen, he finished fourth. He also finished fifth in the Individual Normal Hill at the 1931 Nordic skiing World Championships.
