= Bernt Evensen =

Norwegian speed skater and cyclist

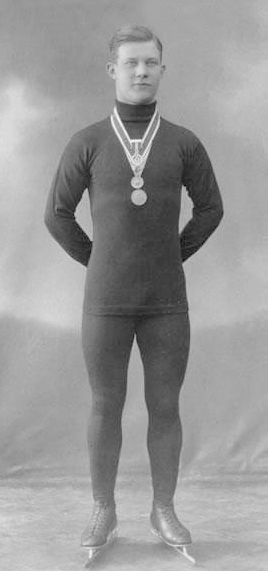

Personal information
- Born: 18 April 1905 Kristiania, Oslo, Norway
- Died: 24 August 1979 (aged 74) Oslo, Norway
- Height: 175 cm (5 ft 9 in)

Sport
- Country: Norway
- Sport: Speed skating
- Club: Oslo SK
Medal record
Olympic Games
Gold medal – first place	1928 St. Moritz	500 m
Silver medal – second place	1928 St. Moritz	1,500 m
Bronze medal – third place	1928 St. Moritz	5,000 m
Silver medal – second place	1932 Lake Placid	500 m
World Allround Championships
Bronze medal – third place	1926	Allround
Gold medal – first place	1927	Allround
Bronze medal – third place	1928	Allround
Silver medal – second place	1931	Allround
Bronze medal – third place	1932	Allround
Gold medal – first place	1934	Allround
European Allround Championships
Gold medal – first place	1927	Allround
Silver medal – second place	1928	Allround
Silver medal – second place	1935	Allround

Bernt Sverre Evensen (18 April 1905 – 24 August 1979) was a Norwegian speed skater and racing cyclist who competed in skating at the 1928 and 1932 Winter Olympics.

In 1928 he became the first Norwegian skater to win an Olympic gold medal by winning the 500 m event (first place shared with Clas Thunberg). At the same Olympics, he also won silver in the 1500 m and bronze over 5,000 m. He was in second place in the 10,000 m event, 0.1 seconds behind Irving Jaffee, when the competition was cancelled because the ice had started thawing.

At the 1932 Olympics in Lake Placid, Evensen won a silver medal in the 500 m. Evensen and compatriot Ivar Ballangrud were the only European Olympic speed skating medalists during those games. This can mostly be attributed to the fact that the races were skated in pack-style (having all competitors skate at the same time), a format that most European skaters were not familiar with.

At the World Allround Championships, Evensen finished first in 1927 and 1934, second in 1931, and third in 1926, 1928, and 1932. At the European Allround Championships, Evensen won the gold medal in 1927 and silvers in 1928 and 1935. As a cyclist, he won 11 Norwegian championships. For his achievements in speed skating and cycling, he was awarded the Egebergs Ærespris in 1928. After World War II, he was a speed skating coach for Oslo Skøiteklub (OSK) before the speed skating revolution in 1962–1963. His grandson Stig Kristiansen became an Olympic cyclist.

== Medals ==
An overview of medals won by Evensen at important championships he participated in, listing the years in which he won each:

Championships	Gold medal	Silver medal	Bronze medal
Winter Olympics	1928 (500 m)	1928 (1,500 m); 1932 (500 m)	1928 (5,000 m)
World Allround	1927; 1934	1931	1926; 1928; 1932
European Allround	1927	1928; 1935	–
Norwegian Allround	1927; 1928; 1933; 1935	–	1929

== Personal records ==
To put these personal records in perspective, the last column (Notes) lists the official world records on the dates that Evensen skated his personal records.

Personal records
Men's Speed skating
Event	Result	Date	Location	Notes
500 m	43.2	13 January 1934	Davos	42.5
1,000 m	1:31.9	12 February 1937	Oslo	1:28.4
1,500 m	2:20.6	5 February 1928	Davos	2:17.4
3,000 m	5:01.0	6 January 1934	Oslo	4:59.1
5,000 m	8:36.7	14 January 1934	Davos	8:19.2
10,000 m	17:30.2	5 February 1928	Davos	17:22.6

Evensen has an Adelskalender score of 194.246 points. His highest ranking on the Adelskalender was a fourth place.

Awards
Preceded by Johan Støa	Egebergs Ærespris; 1928	Succeeded by Armand Carlsen
