= Alexander Hurd =

Canadian speed skater

Personal information
- Born: July 21, 1910 Montreal, Quebec, Canada
- Died: May 28, 1982 (aged 71) Tampa, Florida, USA

Sport
- Sport: Speed skating
Medal record
Men's speed skating
Representing Canada
Olympic Games
Silver medal – second place	1932 Lake Placid	1500 m
Bronze medal – third place	1932 Lake Placid	500 m

Alexander Brengle Hurd (July 21, 1910 – May 28, 1982) was a Canadian speed skater and Olympic medalist. He won a silver medal and a bronze medal at the 1932 Winter Olympics in Lake Placid.
