= James B. Sheffield Olympic Skating Rink =

Ice skating rink in Lake Placid, New York

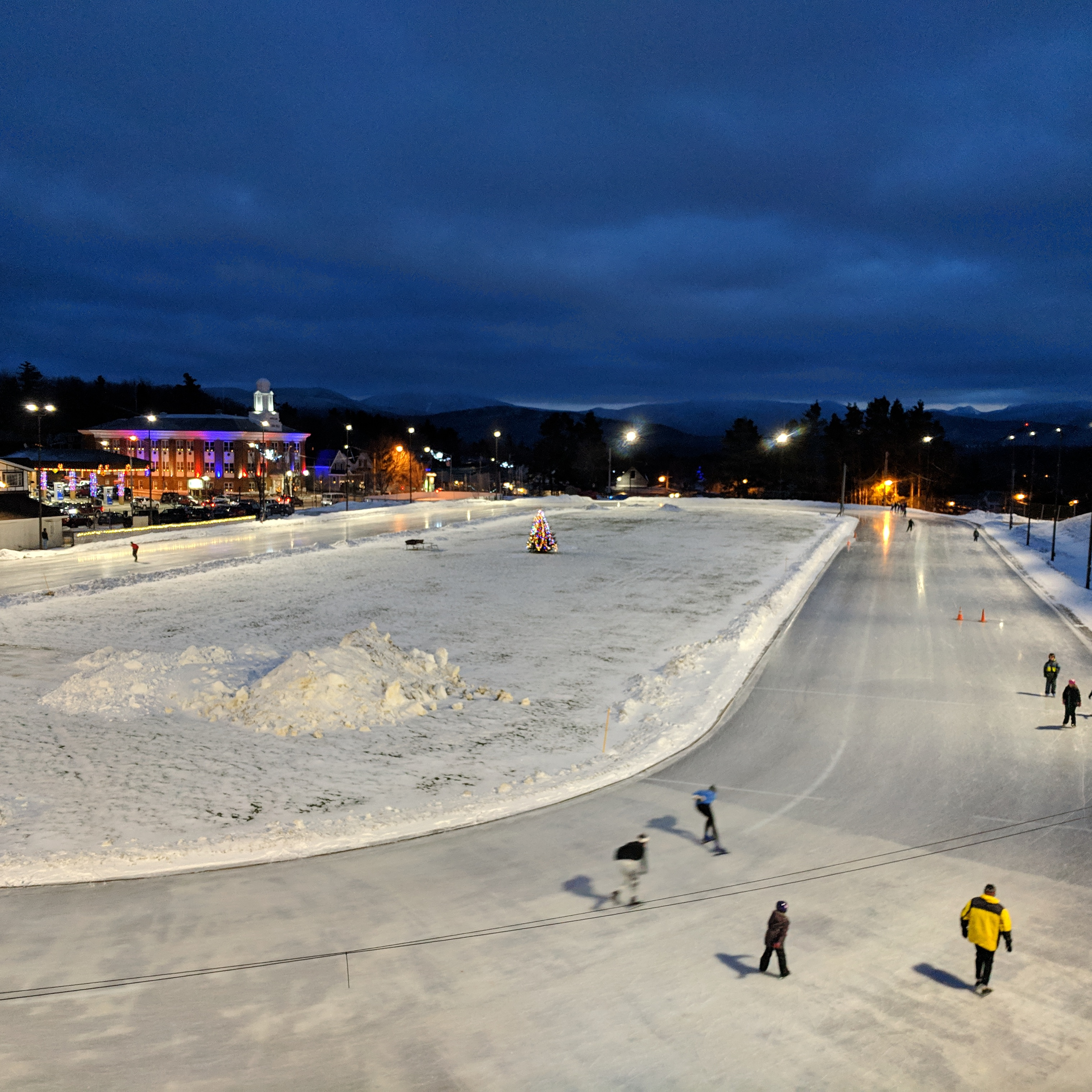
- Interactive map of James B. Sheffield Olympic Skating Rink
- Former names: Olympic Stadium Lake Placid
- Location: Lake Placid, New York
- Coordinates: 44.28256°N 73.984063°W
- Capacity: 7,500 (1932 stadium)
- Surface: Ice
- Field size: 400 meters

Construction
- Opened: 1932
- Renovated: 1977

The James B. Sheffield Olympic Skating Rink is an outdoor artificial ice track for speedskating in Lake Placid, New York, United States (US). The arena hosted the speedskating events at both the 1932 (six of the twelve ice hockey matches) and 1980 Winter Olympics. During the time between the two Olympics events, the rink hosted Lake Placid High School football games.

== History ==
The rink, which is located in the same area as Lake Placid High School, was built outdoors as a skating rink for the Winter Olympics in 1932. Besides "speed drills", the arena was also used for the Olympics opening and closing ceremonies, the starting- and end-point for cross-country exercises and dog racing (demonstration branch), and ice hockey matches. The Tribune section of the rink was capable of accommodating 7,500 spectators and was demolished following the completion of the Olympics.

Two weeks after the 1932 Olympics, the 1932 World Allround Speed Skating Championship was held at the rink and the venue was subsequently reused for other sports. International skating competitions have not been held at the rink since the Olympics.

The city was awarded the 1980 Winter Olympics in October 1974, at a time when an artificial ice track was being constructed (which opened in late-fall 1977). The first international championship to be held at the new rink was the 1978 World Sprint Speed Skating Championship for women and men.

During the 1980 Olympics competition, Eric Heiden won five gold medals and set a world record in the 10,000-meter event, with a time of 14.28,13—the only world record to have been achieved at the rink.

The women's 1989 Allround World Championships was held at the rink but an international championship has not occurred at the rink since this time.
