= 1932 Winter Olympics =

Multi-sport event in Lake Placid, New York, US

Coordinates: 44.285°N 73.985°W

III Olympic Winter Games
- Location: Lake Placid, New York, United States
- Nations: 17
- Athletes: 252 (231 men, 21 women)
- Events: 14 in 4 sports (7 disciplines)
- Opening: February 4, 1932
- Closing: February 13, 1932
- Opened by: Governor Franklin D. Roosevelt
- Stadium: Olympic Stadium Lake Placid

The 1932 Winter Olympics, officially known as the III Olympic Winter Games and commonly known as Lake Placid 1932, were a winter multi-sport event in the United States, held in Lake Placid, New York, United States. The games opened on February 4 and closed on February 13. It was the first time the Winter Games were held outside of Europe and the first of four Winter Olympics held in the United States; Lake Placid hosted again in 1980.

The games were awarded to Lake Placid in part by the efforts of Godfrey Dewey, head of the Lake Placid Club and son of Melvil Dewey, inventor of the Dewey Decimal System. California also had a bid for the 1932 Winter Games. William May Garland, president of the California X Olympiad Association, wanted the games to take place in Wrightwood and Big Pines, California. The world's largest ski jump at the time was constructed in Big Pines for the event, but the games were ultimately awarded to Lake Placid.

The practice of awarding Olympic medals at podium ceremonies was established at the 1932 Winter Olympics, based on pedestals used at the 1930 British Empire Games, as proposed by Melville Marks Robinson.

== Highlights ==
- American company Coca-Cola became the official provider of that games' soft drinks and would remain so for all subsequent winter Olympics (as of 2024).
- The Games were opened by Franklin D. Roosevelt, then the Governor of New York. He would be elected President of the United States nine months later.
- The victory podium was used for the first time at the winter games. Speed skater Jack Shea became the first Olympic champion to receive a gold medal on the podium.
- Billy Fiske (who would win his second gold medal at Lake Placid, having won his first at 16 in the 1928 Winter Olympics), carried the flag for the United States in the opening ceremonies. A planner of a winter resort in Aspen, Colorado, he was killed in 1940 flying in the Battle of Britain.
- Sonja Henie won the second of three consecutive Olympic gold medals in figure skating. She also won gold in 1928 and 1936.
- Irving Jaffee won the 5,000 m (3.1 mi) and the 10,000 m (6.2 mi) speed skating gold medals, beating previous champion and world record holder Ivar Ballangrud in the 10,000 m by 4.5 m (15 ft).
- Eddie Eagan became the only Olympian to win gold medals at both the summer and winter games in different sports. He won gold in boxing in the 1920 Antwerp summer games and gold in bobsleigh at Lake Placid. The bobsleigh race was held two days after the games' closing ceremonies due to unseasonably warm weather in the region the week prior.
- Georg Gyssling, a member of the Nazi Party, joined a newly created four man bobsledding team after half the German team was injured in several violent crashes on Mount Van Hoevenberg. René Fonjallaz, a future Nazi propagandist on the Swiss team, was also injured and left unconscious for five minutes after a crash during a practice run.
- The United States topped the medal count with a total of 12 medals (6 gold, 4 silver, and 2 bronze). This was the only time the U.S. led the overall medal standings at the Winter Olympics until the 2010 Games in Vancouver, and the only time the United States won the most gold medals.
- Seventeen countries participated.

== Events ==
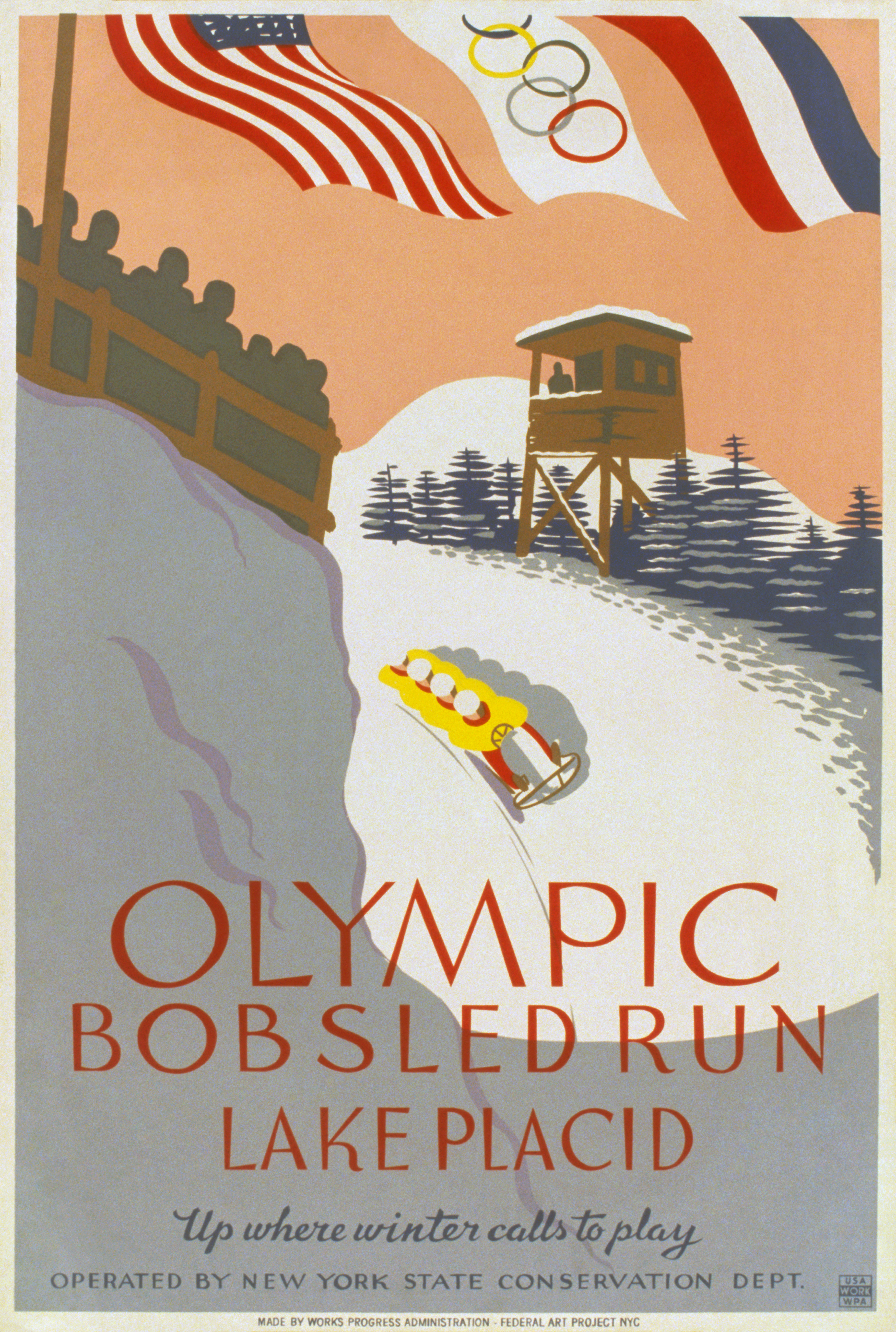
A WPA poster, advertising the bobsled run

Medals were awarded in 14 events contested in 4 sports (7 disciplines).

- Bobsleigh (2) ()
- Ice hockey (1) ()
- Skating
  - Figure skating (3) ()
  - Speed skating (4) ()
- Nordic skiing ()
  - Cross-country skiing (2) ()
  - Nordic combined (1) ()
  - Ski jumping (1) ()

=== Demonstration sports ===
The Games also included events in three demonstration sports.

- Curling
- Sled dog race
- Speed skating (women)

== Venues ==
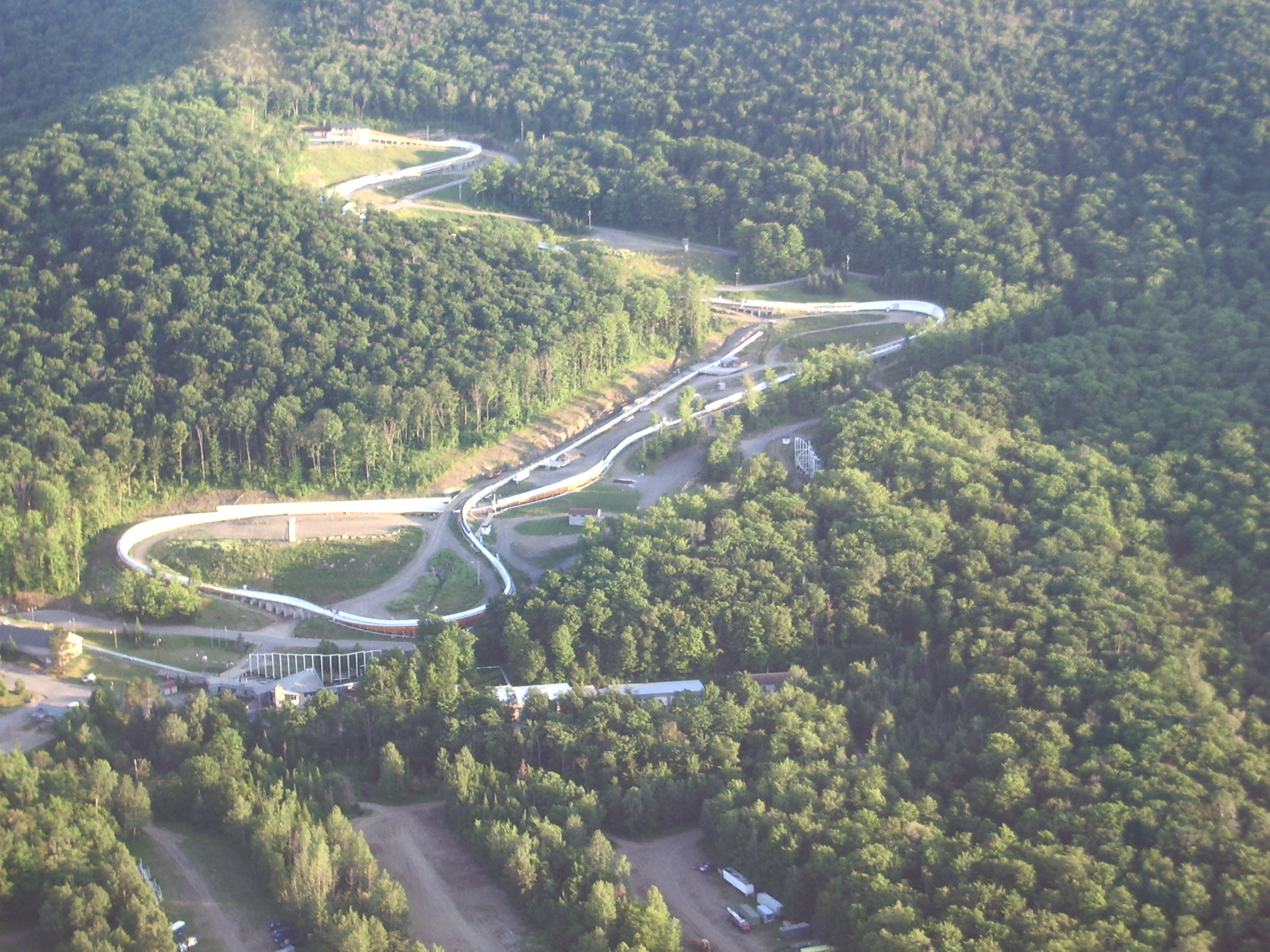
The Olympic Bobsled run from the air

Venue	Sports	Capacity	Ref.
Intervales Ski-Hill	Nordic combined (ski jumping), Ski jumping	9,200	
Lake Placid	Cross-country skiing, Nordic combined (cross-country skiing)	Not listed.	
Mt. Van Hoevenberg Bob-Run	Bobsleigh	12,500	
Olympic Arena	Figure skating, Ice hockey (final)	3,360	
Olympic Stadium	Ice hockey, Speed skating	7,475	

== Participating nations ==
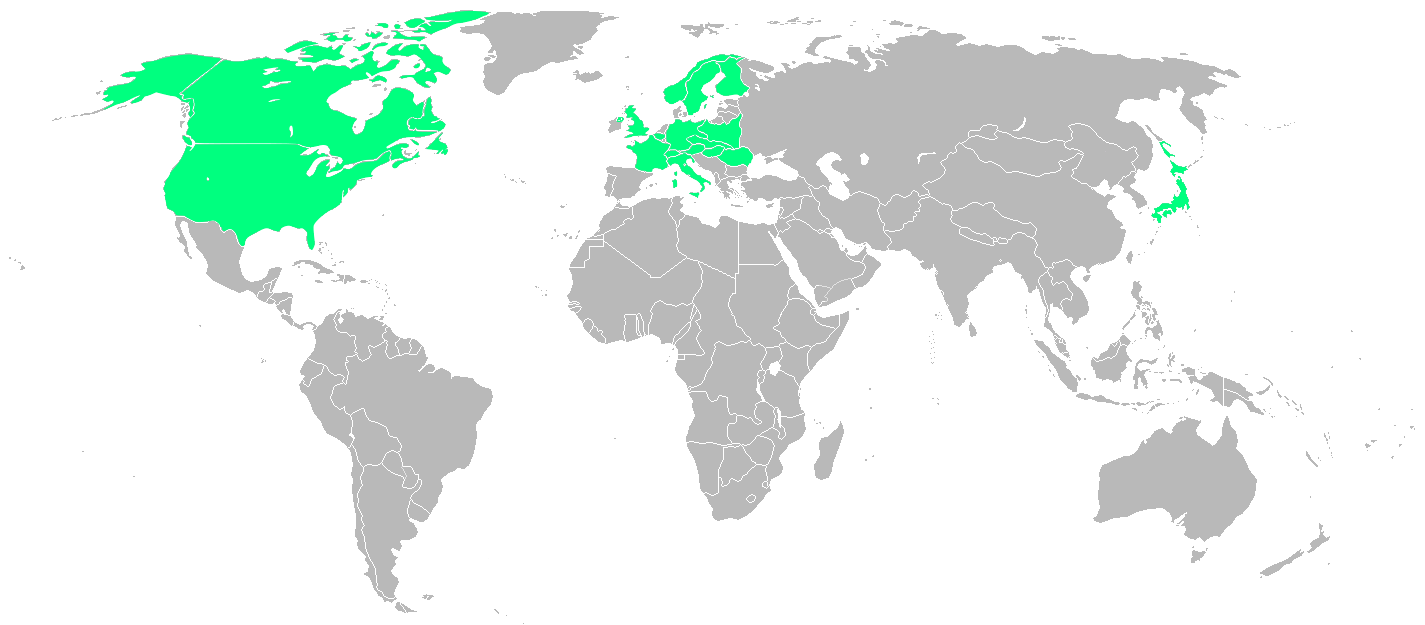
Participating nations map.

Athletes from 17 nations competed in these Games, down from 25 nations at the previous Games in 1928. Argentina, Estonia, Latvia, Lithuania, Luxembourg, Mexico, the Netherlands, and Yugoslavia did not send athletes to Lake Placid.

Participating National Olympic Committees
- Austria (7)
- Belgium (5)
- Canada (42)
- Czechoslovakia (6)
- Finland (7)
- France (8)
- Germany (20)
- Great Britain (4)
- Hungary (4)
- Italy (12)
- Japan (16)
- Norway (19)
- Poland (15)
- Romania (4)
- Sweden (12)
- Switzerland (7)
- United States (64) (host)

=== Number of athletes by National Olympic Committees ===
IOC Letter Code	Country	Athletes
USA	United States	64
CAN	Canada	42
GER	Germany	20
NOR	Norway	19
JPN	Japan	16
POL	Poland	15
ITA	Italy	12
SWE	Sweden	12
FRA	France	8
AUT	Austria	7
FIN	Finland	7
SUI	Switzerland	7
TCH	Czechoslovakia	6
BEL	Belgium	5
GBR	Great Britain	4
HUN	Hungary	4
ROM	Romania	4
Total		252

== Medal count ==
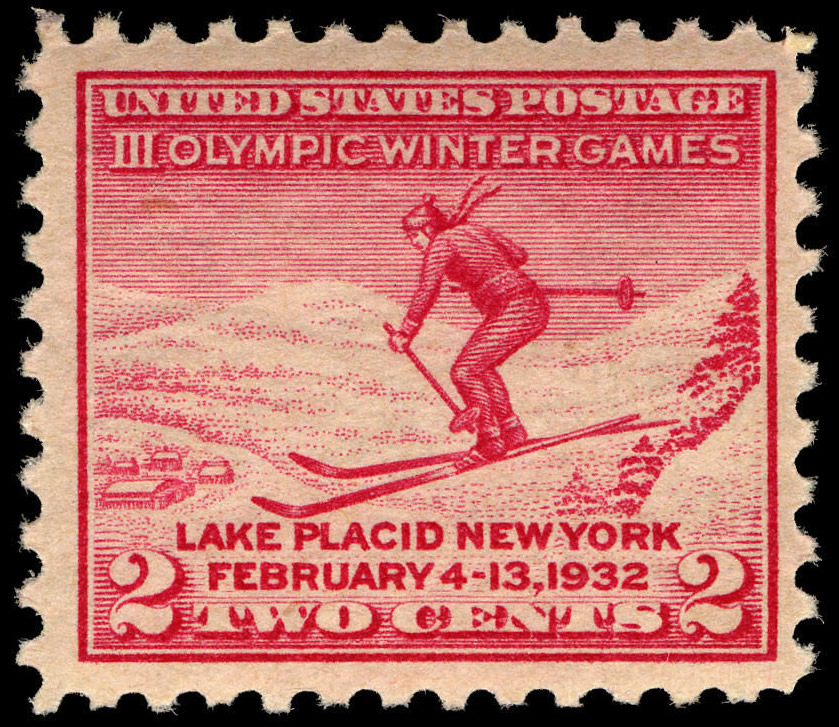
III Olympic Winter Games U.S. commemorative stamp (1932)

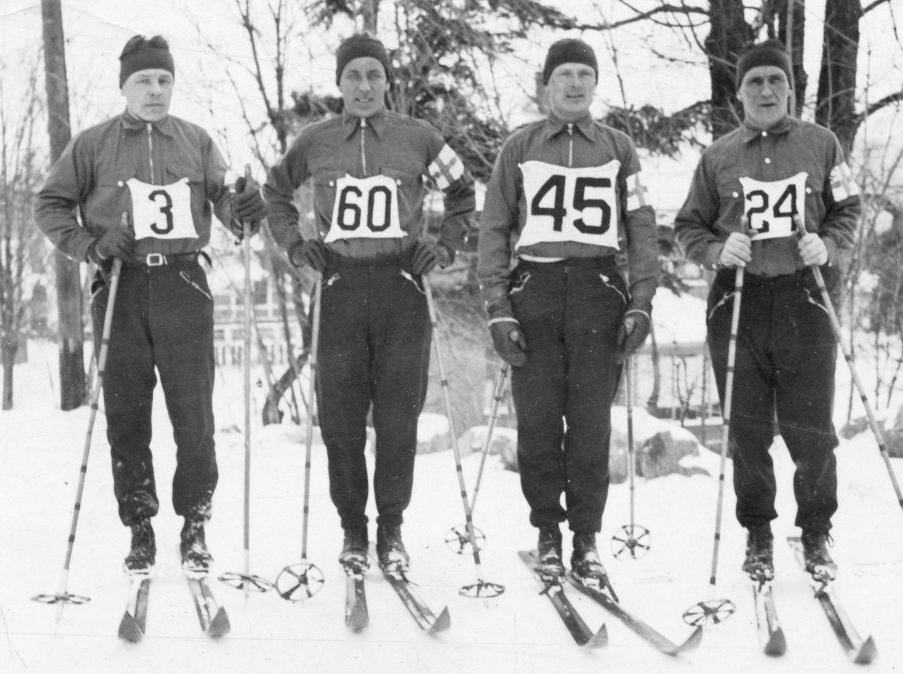
Finnish skiers: Valmari Toikka, Veli Saarinen, Väinö Liikkanen and Martti Lappalainen

Host country

Rank	Nation	Gold	Silver	Bronze	Total
1	United States*	6	4	2	12
2	Norway	3	4	3	10
3	Sweden	1	2	0	3
4	Canada	1	1	5	7
5	Finland	1	1	1	3
6	Austria	1	1	0	2
7	France	1	0	0	1
8	Switzerland	0	1	0	1
9	Germany	0	0	2	2
10	Hungary	0	0	1	1
Totals (10 entries)		14	14	14	42

=== Podium sweeps ===
Date	Sport	Event	NOC	Gold	Silver	Bronze
11 February	Nordic combined	Individual	Norway	Johan Grøttumsbråten	Ole Stenen	Hans Vinjarengen
12 February	Ski jumping	Normal hill	Norway	Birger Ruud	Hans Beck	Kaare Wahlberg

== See also ==
- 1932 Summer Olympics
- Olympic Games held in the United States
  - 1904 Summer Olympics – St. Louis
  - 1932 Summer Olympics – Los Angeles
  - 1932 Winter Olympics – Lake Placid
  - 1960 Winter Olympics – Squaw Valley
  - 1980 Winter Olympics – Lake Placid
  - 1984 Summer Olympics – Los Angeles
  - 1996 Summer Olympics – Atlanta
  - 2002 Winter Olympics – Salt Lake City
  - 2028 Summer Olympics – Los Angeles
  - 2034 Winter Olympics – Salt Lake City
- List of IOC country codes

Winter Olympics
Preceded by St. Moritz	III Olympic Winter Games; Lake Placid; 1932	Succeeded by Garmisch-Partenkirchen
