= Bowker =

Bowker is an English surname. Notable people with the surname include:

- Alan Bowker, Canadian diplomat and educator
- Albert H. Bowker (1919–2008), American educator
- Aldrich Bowker (1875–1947), American actor
- Art Bowker (born 1961), American writer
- David Bowker (sailor) (1922–2020), British sailor
- David Bowker (writer), British author and screenwriter
- Emily Bowker, British actress
- Geoffrey C. Bowker, American professor of informatics
- Gordon Bowker, American businessman
- Sir James Bowker (1877–1954), American businessman
- James Bowker (1901–1983), British ambassador
- James Henry Bowker (1822–1900), South African naturalist and soldier
- Joe Bowker (1881–1955), English boxer
- John Bowker (theologian) (born 1935), English Anglican priest and scholar
- John Bowker (baseball) (born 1983), American baseball player
- Joseph Bowker (1725–1784), American politician
- Judi Bowker (born 1954), English actress
- Keith Bowker (born 1951), Former English Professional Footballer
- Lauren Bowker (born 1985), British designer
- Neville Bowker, Rhodesian fighter ace
- Peter Bowker (born 1958), British playwright and screenwriter
- Radney Bowker (born 1979), British rugby player
- Richard Bowker (Australian businessman) (1815–1903), Australian physician, surgeon and politician
- Richard Rogers Bowker (1848–1933), American journalist and businessman

- R. R. Bowker, American publishing industry support company

- Richard Bowker (British businessman) (born 1966), CEO of National Express and Strategic Rail Authority
- Richard Bowker (writer) (born 1950), American writer of crime and science fiction
- Silas Bowker (1769–1834), American politician
