= Publishers Weekly =

American weekly trade news magazine

- Cover of the November 6, 2006 issue
- Editorial Director: Jonathan Segura
- Categories: Publishing; Book reviews Trade magazine
- Frequency: Weekly
- Publisher: Joe Murray
- Total circulation: 24,000 (2017)
- First issue: 1872; 154 years ago
- Company: PWxyz, LLC
- Country: United States
- Based in: New York City
- Language: English
- Website: www.publishersweekly.com
- ISSN: 0000-0019 (print); 2150-4008 (web)
- OCLC: 2489456

Publishers Weekly (PW) is an American weekly trade news magazine targeted at publishers, librarians, booksellers, and literary agents. Published continuously since 1872, it has carried the tagline, "The International News Magazine of Book Publishing and Bookselling." With 51 issues a year, the emphasis today is on book reviews.

== History ==
=== Nineteenth century ===
The magazine was founded by bibliographer Frederick Leypoldt in the late 1860s and had various titles until Leypoldt settled on the name The Publishers' Weekly (with an apostrophe) in 1872. The publication was a compilation of information about newly published books, collected from publishers and from other sources by Leypoldt, for an audience of booksellers. By 1876, The Publishers' Weekly was being read by nine tenths of the booksellers in the country.

In 1878, Leypoldt sold The Publishers' Weekly to his friend Richard Rogers Bowker, in order to free up time for his other bibliographic endeavors. Augusta Garrigue Leypoldt, wife of Frederick Leypoldt, stayed with the publication for thirty years. The publication eventually expanded to include features and articles.

Harry Thurston Peck was the first editor-in-chief of The Bookman, which began in 1895. Peck worked on its staff from 1895 to 1906, and in 1895, he created the world's first bestseller list for its pages.

=== Twentieth century ===
In 1912, Publishers Weekly began to publish its own bestseller lists, patterned after the lists in The Bookman. These were not separated into fiction and non-fiction until 1917, when World War I brought an increased interest in non-fiction by the reading public.

For much of the twentieth century, Publishers Weekly was guided and developed by Frederic Gershom Melcher (1879–1963), who was editor and co-editor of Publishers' Weekly and chairman of the magazine's publisher, R. R. Bowker, over four decades. Born April 12, 1879, in Malden, Massachusetts, Melcher began at age 16 in Boston's Estes & Lauriat Bookstore, where he developed an interest in children's books. He moved to Indianapolis in 1913 for another bookstore job. In 1918, he read in Publishers' Weekly that the magazine's editorship was vacant. He applied to Richard Rogers Bowker for the job, was hired, and moved with his family to Montclair, New Jersey. He remained with R. R. Bowker for 45 years.

While at Publishers Weekly, Melcher began creating space in the publication and a number of issues dedicated solely to books for children. In 1919, he teamed with Franklin K. Mathiews, librarian for the Boy Scouts of America, and Anne Carroll Moore, a librarian at the New York Public Library, to create Children's Book Week.

When Bowker died in 1933, Melcher succeeded him as president of the company; he resigned in 1959 to become chairman of the board of directors.

In 1943, Publishers Weekly created the Carey–Thomas Award for creative publishing, naming it in honor of Mathew Carey and Isaiah Thomas.

For most of its history, Publishers Weekly, along with the Library Journal-related titles, were owned by founding publisher R. R. Bowker. When Reed Publishing purchased Bowker from Xerox in 1985, it placed Publishers Weekly under the management of its Boston-based Cahners Publishing Company, the trade publishing empire founded by Norman Cahners, which Reed Publishing had purchased in 1977.

The merger of Reed with the Netherlands-based Elsevier in 1993 led to many Cahners cutbacks amid takeover turmoil. Nora Rawlinson, who once headed a $4 million book selection budget at the Baltimore County Library System, edited Library Journal for four years prior to becoming editor-in-chief of Publishers Weekly in 1992, where he served until 2005.

=== Twenty-first century ===
In 2005, the magazine came under the direction of a new editor-in-chief, veteran book reviewer Sara Nelson, known for publishing columns in the New York Post and The New York Observer. Nelson began to modernize Publishers Weekly with new features and a makeover by illustrator and graphic designer Jean-Claude Suares. The switch to a simple abbreviated logo of initials effectively changed the name of the magazine to PW, the name long used for the magazine within the book industry.

She also introduced the magazine's short-lived Quill Awards, with nominees in 19 categories selected by a nominating board of 6,000 booksellers and librarians. Winners were determined by the reading public, who could vote at kiosks in Borders stores or online at the Quills site. Reed Business dropped the Quill Awards in 2008.

Since 1872, the front covers of Publishers Weekly were used to display advertisements by book publishers. PW editorial covers now feature illustrations and author photographs tied to interior articles, these covers follow the front cover advertisement. The visual motif of each cover is sometimes repeated on the contents page.

The Nelson years were marked by turbulence within the industry as well as a continuing trend away from serious writing and towards pop culture. Publishers Weekly has enjoyed a near monopoly over the past decades, but now with vigorous competition from Internet sites, e-mail newsletters, and daily newspapers.

In 2008, faced with a decline in advertising support, Reed's management sought a new direction. In January 2009, Sara Nelson was dismissed along with executive editor Daisy Maryles, who had been with PW for more than four decades. Stepping in as editorial director was Brian Kenney, editorial director of School Library Journal and Library Journal. The dismissals, which sent shockwaves through the industry, were widely covered in newspapers.

In April 2010, George W. Slowik Jr., a former publisher of the magazine, purchased Publishers Weekly from Reed Business Information, under the company PWxyz, LLC. Cevin Bryerman remained as publisher along with co-editors Jim Milliot and Michael Coffey.

On September 22, 2011, PW began a series of weekly podcasts: "Beyond the Book: PW's Week Ahead".

In 2019, The Millions was acquired by PWxyz.

PW maintains an online archive of past book reviews from January 1991 to the present. The earliest articles posted in PW's online archive date back to November 1995. A redesigned website was unveiled on May 10, 2010.

== Features ==
=== Writers and readers ===
In 2008, the magazine's circulation was 25,000. In 2004, the breakdown of those 25,000 readers was given as 6000 publishers; 5500 public libraries and public library systems; 3800 booksellers; 1600 authors and writers; 1500 college and university libraries; 950 print, film and broad media; and 750 literary and rights agents, among others.

Subject areas covered by Publishers Weekly include publishing, bookselling, marketing, merchandising and trade news, along with author interviews and regular columns on rights, people in publishing, and bestsellers. It attempts to serve all involved in the creation, production, marketing and sale of the written word in book, audio, video and electronic formats. The magazine increases the page count considerably for four annual special issues: Spring Adult Announcements, Fall Adult Announcements, Spring Children's Announcements, and Fall Children's Announcements.

=== Book reviews ===
The book review section of Publishers Weekly was added in the early 1940s and grew in importance during the 20th century and through the present day. It currently offers prepublication reviews of 9,000 new trade books each year, in a comprehensive range of genres and including audiobooks and ebooks, with a digitized archive of 200,000 reviews. Reviews appear two to four months prior to the publication date of a book, and until 2014, when PW launched BookLife.com, a website for self-published books, books already in print were seldom reviewed.

These anonymous reviews are short, averaging 200–250 words, and it is not unusual for the review section to run as long as 40 pages, filling the second half of the magazine. In the past, a book review editorial staff of eight editors assigned books to more than 100 freelance reviewers. Some are published authors, and others are experts in specific genres or subjects. Although it might take a week or more to read and analyze some books, reviewers were paid $45 per review until June 2008, when the magazine introduced a reduction in payment to $25 a review. In a further policy change that month, reviewers received credit as contributors in issues carrying their reviews. Currently, there are nine reviews editors listed in the masthead.

Now titled "Reviews", the review section began life as "Forecasts". For several years, that title was taken literally; reviews were followed with italicized comments that attempted to predict a book's sales success. Genevieve Stuttaford, who greatly expanded the number of reviews during her tenure as the nonfiction "Forecasts" editor, joined the PW staff in 1975. Previously, she was a Saturday Review associate editor, reviewer for Kirkus Reviews and for 12 years on the staff of the San Francisco Chronicle. During the 23 years Stuttaford was with Publishers Weekly, book reviewing was increased from an average of 3,800 titles a year in the 1970s to well over 6,500 titles in 1997. She retired in 1998.

Several notable PW editors stand out for making their mark on the magazine. Barbara Bannon was the head fiction reviewer during the 1970s and early 1980s, becoming the magazine's executive editor during that time and retiring in 1983. She was, notably, the first reviewer to insist that her name be appended to any blurb of her reviews, thus drawing attention to herself, to the review and to the influence of the magazine in predicting a book's popularity and salability.

Sybil Steinberg came to Publishers Weekly in the mid-1970s and served as a reviews editor for 30 years, taking over after Barbara Bannon retired. Under Steinberg, PW instituted the starred review, a first in the industry, to indicate books of exceptional merit. She also called out particular books of merit by starting the practice of boxed reviews, a precursor to the PW "signature reviews", boxed reviews that are attributed to the reviewer. The "Best Books" lists were also Steinberg's brainchild, and these lists are still published annually, usually in November ahead of "Best Books" lists from The New York Times and other prominent review venues. Steinberg edited the magazine's author interviews, and beginning in 1992 put together four anthologies of them in book form, published by the Pushcart Press.

Formerly of InStyle magazine, reviews director Louisa Ermelino joined Publishers Weekly in 2005; by 2013, she was overseeing nearly 9,000 PW reviews per year.

In a sea change for the magazine, Ermelino oversaw the integration of self-published book reviews into the main review section of the magazine. Review editors vet and assign self-published books for review, which reviews are then published alongside the reviews of traditionally published books each week in the magazine.

Publishers Weekly does charge for self-published book reviews following the trend within the industry led by Kirkus Reviews and Foreword's Clarion fee-for-review service, both of which offer independent book reviews in exchange for fees in the hundreds of dollars.

Publishers Weekly does syndicate its reviews to a variety of online retail venues such as Amazon, Apple Books, Powell's Books, Books-A-Million, and others. The reviews are also carried by library database services such as Baker and Taylor, ProQuest, Bowker, Cengage, EBSCO, and others.

== See also ==
- Publishers Weekly list of bestselling novels in the United States in the 2010s, or the decades before
- Booklist
- Editor & Publisher
- San Francisco Review of Books
- Books in the United States
