= List of flag bearers for the United States at the Olympics =

United States at the Olympics
- Flag of the United States
- IOC code: USA
- NOC: United States Olympic & Paralympic Committee
- Medals Ranked 1st: Gold 1,219 Silver 1,000 Bronze 876 Total 3,095

Summer appearances
- 1896; 1900; 1904; 1908; 1912; 1920; 1924; 1928; 1932; 1936; 1948; 1952; 1956; 1960; 1964; 1968; 1972; 1976; 1980; 1984; 1988; 1992; 1996; 2000; 2004; 2008; 2012; 2016; 2020; 2024; 2028

Winter appearances
- 1924; 1928; 1932; 1936; 1948; 1952; 1956; 1960; 1964; 1968; 1972; 1976; 1980; 1984; 1988; 1992; 1994; 1998; 2002; 2006; 2010; 2014; 2018; 2022; 2026

Other related appearances
- 1906 Intercalated Games

This is a list of flag bearers who have represented United States at the Olympics. Flag bearers carry the national flag of their country at the opening ceremony and closing ceremony of the Olympic Games. Men and women from across the country and from a variety of sports have carried the flag at both the Summer Olympic Games and the Winter Olympic Games. More than half of those representing the teams at the Summer Olympics are track or field athletes, though that sport does account for the most competitors at the Games.

James Bickford, Norman Armitage, and Pat McDonald have all performed the duty twice. Several athletes born in other countries have carried the flag, including those from Norway, Ireland, Sudan, Germany, and Czechoslovakia.

== Firsts ==
U.S. team manager Matthew Halpin was the first to carry the flag at the 1906 Intercalated Games, though that event is no longer considered by the International Olympic Committee to be part of Olympic history. Ralph Rose became the first competitor to have the honor when he led the team out at the 1908 Summer Games, the first official Olympic Games to feature a parade of nations. The first woman to represent the United States was fencer Janice Romary in 1968, her sixth consecutive Summer Olympics. Native American Ojibwe Taffy Abel was the first person to represent the United States at the Winter Olympics when he was chosen to carry the flag at the inaugural Games in Chamonix in 1924. Abel has been the only Native American flag bearer in the Winter or Summer Olympics. Rafer Johnson became the first African American to serve as the nation's flag bearer at the 1960 Summer Olympics. Janice Romary became the first woman to carry the flag at the 1968 Summer Olympics. Irish-born Pat McDonald, one of the "Irish Whales", became the first athlete to be selected as the flag bearer twice when he performed his second duty in 1924. In 1956 two other athletes led the U.S. team out for a second time, James Bickford at the Winter Olympics and Norman Armitage at the Summer Games.

== Selection and reactions ==
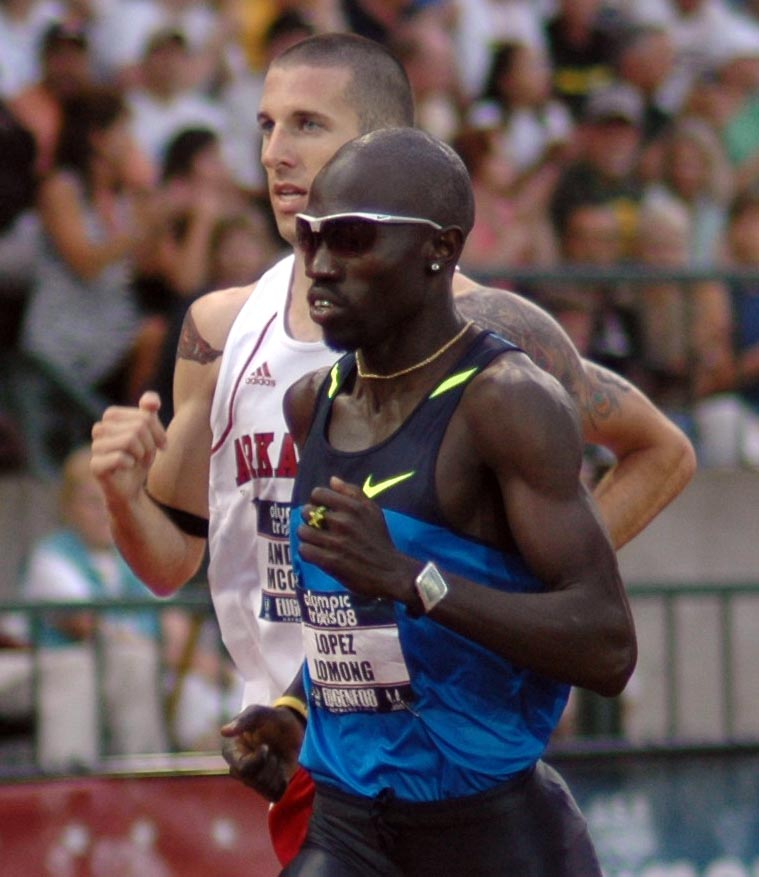
Lopez Lomong says he felt "blessed" to be selected as the 2008 flag bearer.

The flag bearers are chosen by a vote of the team captains of each sport.

Athletes view their selection of flag bearer as a great honor:

It's more than a dream. "I keep saying, I'm not sure if this is true or not true. I'm making the team and now I'm the first guy coming to the stadium and the whole world will be watching me carry the flag. There are no words to describe it."

"I feel happy, honored. I'm feeling so blessed to get an opportunity to present the United States of America, to present the United States flag in front of my team."

— Lopez Lomong

I'm still shaking. I was incredibly surprised when Brian [Martin] told me, and I'm still trying to process it all. To be the person leading the U.S. team into the opening ceremony is just such a great honor."

— Mark Grimmette in a statement released by the U.S. Olympic Committee

== Flag dipping ==
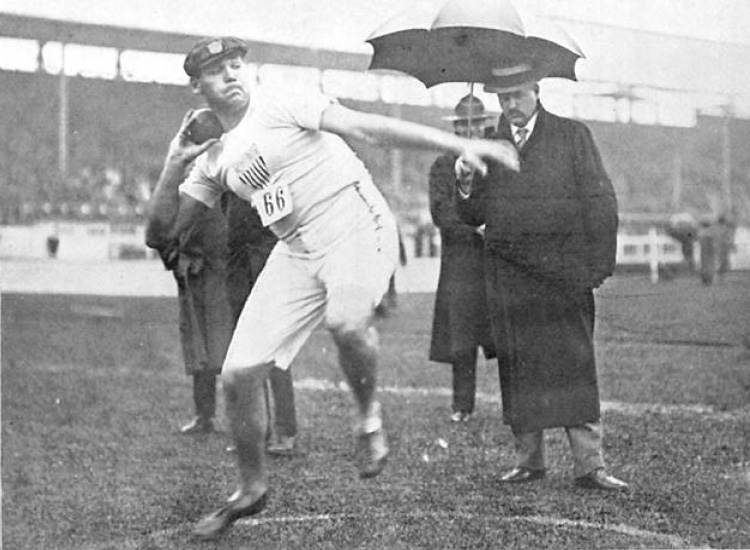
Ralph Rose competing at the 1908 Olympics after not dipping the flag in the opening ceremony

Olympic protocol is that the flag bearer dips their flag to the head of state as part of the parade. It has become tradition that the U.S. flag is not dipped, though the origins of this are surrounded by legend and are widely misreported:

The motives for the original refusal, the identity of the flag-bearer and the truth behind the quotation and other issues remain much murkier in the historical record than legend-tellers portray ... The evolution of this flag mythology reveals a great deal about the complex strains of early 20th century American nationalism.

— Mark Dyreson, Pennsylvania State University sports historian

The parade of nations was introduced at the 1906 Intercalated Games with Matthew Halpin as the U.S. flag bearer. Halpin gladly dipped the flag, noting that when he did so King George I of Greece "staked me to a smile that made me feel like I belonged". The controversy began at the 1908 Summer Olympics in London where flag bearers were expected to dip the flag to Edward VII on two occasions. Research by the International Society of Olympic Historians concluded that the flag bearer was Ralph Rose and that he might not have dipped the flag to the British King on one of those occasions in support of Irish struggle against British imperialism. Martin Sheridan is often attributed with the explanation by stating at the time "This flag dips to no earthly king" but no evidence of this can be found. Modern versions of the story describe how the Stars and Stripes have never been dipped during the parade of nations since 1908 but this is apocryphal. It has been dipped on three occasions since then: for Gustav V of Sweden in 1912, 1924, and 1932.

The 1932 winter games were held in Lake Placid and, though head of state President Herbert Hoover would normally have greeted the parade of nations, the duty was passed to New York governor Franklin Roosevelt. This was the last time that the flag was dipped at the Olympics as political forces intervened thereafter. The head of state awaiting the athletes at the 1936 Summer Games was Adolf Hitler, to whom the U.S. refused to lower their flag. The 1940 Olympics were cancelled due to the onset of World War II and, in 1942, the United States Congress introduced the United States Flag Code which stated: "That no disrespect should be given to the flag of the United States of America, the flag should not be dipped to any person or thing." However, since the Flag Code is legally unenforceable, it appears to be merely codified tradition.

== Foreign-born representatives ==
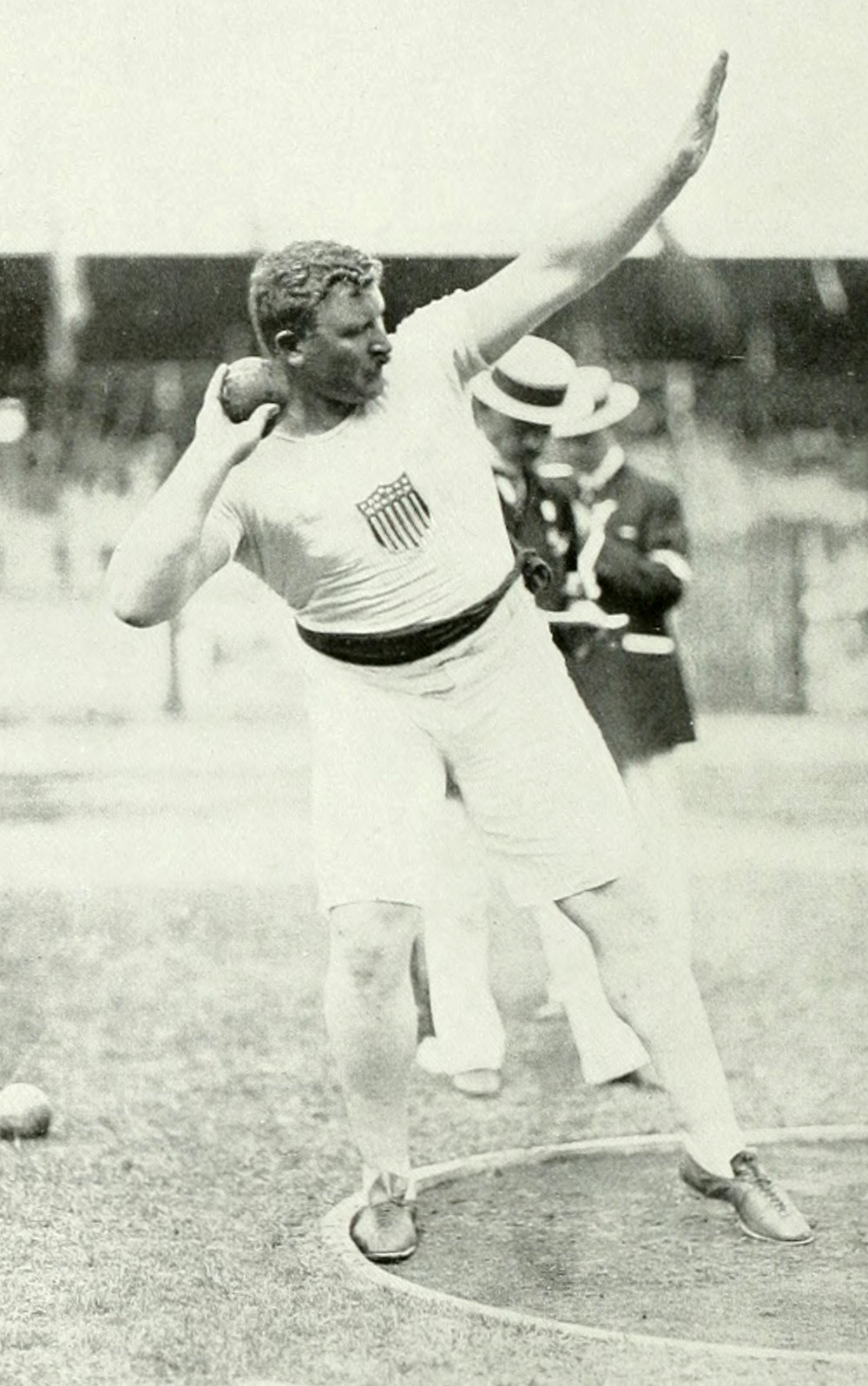
Pat McDonald, the first athlete to carry the flag for the United States on two occasions and the first flag bearer born outside of the U.S.

Several foreign-born athletes have represented the United States at the opening ceremonies. Irishman Pat McDonald immigrated to the U.S. and was the first in 1920 and he, at the age of 42, became the oldest Olympic track & field champion. Though he did not compete, he also went on to lead the U.S. team at the following Summer Olympics.

Rolf Monsen, a multi-discipline Winter sports athlete born in Oslo, Norway, immigrated to the U.S. and competed as an American in 1928 and 1932. He qualified for the 1936 Games and though an injury prevented him from taking part, he was still chosen to carry the flag.

The American team at the 1936 Summer Games were led by Berlin-born, highly regarded gymnast Al Jochim who immigrated to the U.S.

Olga Fikotová was a discus-thrower at the 1956 Summer Olympics and the only athlete to win a gold medal for her home country Czechoslovakia in that year. She began a much-publicised romance with American athlete Hal Connolly, much to the frustration of the Communist authorities. Fikotová was accused of being a traitor and the Czechoslovak Olympic Committee banned her from representing her country again. Now living in the U.S., she would go on to compete for her adopted country in the next four Summer Games. Despite not being able to replicate her success, Fikotová was chosen to lead the American team at the 1972 Games in Munich, West Germany.

Lopez Lomong carried the flag at the 2008 Summer Olympics in Beijing, China and became the fifth flag bearer to be born outside the United States. As a teenager in war-torn Sudan, Lomong was one of several thousand boys brought to America as a refugee in 2001. His selection came during a time when the U.S. and other Western countries had been critical of the Chinese government's close links with Sudan, a country accused of human rights violations and war crimes.

== Other notes ==
Godfrey Dewey, son of Melvil Dewey the inventor of Dewey Decimal Classification, was the president of the Lake Placid Organizing Committee and was largely responsible for the successful candidature of Lake Placid for the 1932 Winter Olympics. In addition to his role as the U.S. ski team manager he was chosen as the flag bearer for the 1928 Games in St. Moritz, Switzerland.

== List of flag bearers ==
List of flag bearers:

Key

Born outside the United States

#	Event year	Season	Ceremony	Flag bearer	Sex	State/Country	Sport
1	1906	Intercalated (summer)	Opening	Matthew Halpin	M	New York	Team manager
2	1908	Summer	Opening	Ralph Rose	M	California	Athletics & tug of war
3	1912	Summer	Opening	George Bonhag	M	Massachusetts	Athletics
4	1920	Summer	Opening	Pat McDonald	M	Ireland	Athletics
5	1924	Winter	Opening	Taffy Abel	M	Michigan	Hockey
6	1924	Summer	Opening	Pat McDonald	M	Ireland	Athletics
7	1928	Winter	Opening	Godfrey Dewey	M	Florida	President of Lake Placid Organizing Committee
8	1928	Summer	Opening	Bud Houser	M	Missouri	Athletics
9	1932	Winter	Opening	Billy Fiske	M	Illinois	Bobsleigh
10	1932	Summer	Opening	Morgan Taylor	M	Iowa	Athletics
11	1936	Winter	Opening	Rolf Monsen	M	Norway	Cross-country skiing
12	1936	Summer	Opening	Al Jochim	M	Germany	Gymnastics
13	1948	Winter	Opening	Jack Heaton	M	Connecticut	Skeleton
14	1948	Summer	Opening	Ralph Craig	M	Michigan	Athletics
15	1952	Winter	Opening	James Bickford	M	New York	Bobsleigh
16	1952	Summer	Opening	Norman Armitage	M	New York	Fencing
17	1956	Winter	Opening	James Bickford	M	New York	Bobsleigh
18	1956	Summer	Opening	Norman Armitage	M	New York	Fencing
19	1960	Winter	Opening	Don McDermott	M	New York	Speed skating
20	1960	Summer	Opening	Rafer Johnson	M	Texas	Athletics
21	1964	Winter	Opening	Bill Disney	M	Kansas	Speed skating
22	1964	Summer	Opening	Parry O'Brien	M	California	Athletics
23	1968	Winter	Opening	Terry McDermott	M	Michigan	Speed skating
24	1968	Summer	Opening	Janice Romary	F	California	Fencing
25	1972	Winter	Opening	Dianne Holum	F	Illinois	Speed skating
26	1972	Summer	Opening	Olga Fikotová	F	Czechoslovakia (now Czech Republic)	Athletics
27	1976	Winter	Opening	Cindy Nelson	F	Minnesota	Alpine skiing
28	1976	Summer	Opening	Gary Hall	M	North Carolina	Swimming
29	1980	Winter	Opening	Scott Hamilton	M	Ohio	Figure skating
30	1984	Winter	Opening	Frank Masley	M	Delaware	Luge
31	1984	Summer	Opening	Ed Burke	M	California	Athletics
32	1988	Winter	Opening	Lyle Nelson	M	Idaho	Biathlon
33	1988	Summer	Opening	Evelyn Ashford	F	Louisiana	Athletics
34	1992	Winter	Opening	Bill Koch	M	Vermont	Cross-country skiing
35	1992	Summer	Opening	Francie Larrieu Smith	F	California	Athletics
36	1992	Summer	Closing	Peter Westbrook	M	Missouri	Fencing
37	1994	Winter	Opening	Cammy Myler	F	New York	Luge
38	1994	Winter	Closing	Dan Jansen	M	Wisconsin	Speed skating
39	1996	Summer	Opening	Bruce Baumgartner	M	New Jersey	Wrestling
40	1996	Summer	Closing	Michael Matz	M	Pennsylvania	Equestrian
41	1998	Winter	Opening	Eric Flaim	M	Massachusetts	Speed skating
42	1998	Winter	Closing	Cammi Granato	F	Illinois	Hockey
43	2000	Summer	Opening	Cliff Meidl	M	California	Canoeing
44	2000	Summer	Closing	Rulon Gardner	M	Wyoming	Wrestling
45	2002	Winter	Opening	Amy Peterson	F	Minnesota	Short track speed skating
46	2002	Winter	Closing	Brian Shimer	M	Florida	Bobsleigh
47	2004	Summer	Opening	Dawn Staley	F	Pennsylvania	Basketball
48	2004	Summer	Closing	Mia Hamm	F	Texas	Women's soccer
49	2006	Winter	Opening	Chris Witty	F	Wisconsin	Speed skating
50	2006	Winter	Closing	Joey Cheek	M	North Carolina	Speed skating
51	2008	Summer	Opening	Lopez Lomong	M	Sudan (now South Sudan)	Athletics
52	2008	Summer	Closing	Khatuna Lorig	F	Georgia	Archery
53	2010	Winter	Opening	Mark Grimmette	M	Michigan	Luge
54	2010	Winter	Closing	Bill Demong	M	New York	Nordic combined
55	2012	Summer	Opening	Mariel Zagunis	F	Oregon	Fencing
56	2012	Summer	Closing	Bryshon Nellum	M	California	Athletics
57	2014	Winter	Opening	Todd Lodwick	M	Colorado	Nordic combined
58	2014	Winter	Closing	Julie Chu	F	Connecticut	Hockey
59	2016	Summer	Opening	Michael Phelps	M	Maryland	Swimming
60	2016	Summer	Closing	Simone Biles	F	Texas	Gymnastics
61	2018	Winter	Opening	Erin Hamlin	F	New York	Luge
62	2018	Winter	Closing	Jessie Diggins	F	Minnesota	Cross-country skiing
63	2020	Summer	Opening	Eddy Alvarez	M	Florida	Baseball
64	2020	Summer	Opening	Sue Bird	F	New York	Basketball
65	2020	Summer	Closing	Kara Winger	F	Washington	Athletics
66	2022	Winter	Opening	Brittany Bowe (Note: Bowe became an opening ceremony flagbearer as the first alternate after Elana Meyers tested positive for COVID-19 and was forced into isolation.)	F	Utah	Speed skating
67	2022	Winter	Opening	John Shuster	M	Minnesota	Curling
68	2022	Winter	Closing	Elana Meyers (Note: Meyers was originally selected as the opening ceremony flagbearer but was forced into isolation after testing positive for COVID-19. She was later voted to be the closing ceremony flagbearer.)	F	Georgia	Bobsleigh
69	2024	Summer	Opening	Coco Gauff	F	Florida	Tennis
70	2024	Summer	Opening	LeBron James	M	Ohio	Basketball
71	2024	Summer	Closing	Katie Ledecky	F	Washington, D.C.	Swimming
72	2024	Summer	Closing	Nick Mead	M	Pennsylvania	Rowing
73	2026	Winter	Opening	Erin Jackson	F	Florida	Speed Skating
74	2026	Winter	Opening	Frank Del Duca	M	Maine	Bobsled
75	2026	Winter	Closing	Evan Bates	M	Michigan	Figure skating
	2026	Winter	Closing	Hilary Knight	F	Idaho	Hockey

== See also ==
- United States at the Olympics
