= School Library Journal =

US monthly magazine

- Categories: Professional library practice for young people
- Frequency: Monthly
- Publisher: Media Source Inc.
- Founded: 1954
- Country: United States
- Based in: New York City, NY, U.S.
- Website: slj.com
- ISSN: 0362-8930
- OCLC: 1798621

School Library Journal (SLJ) is an American monthly magazine containing reviews and other articles for school librarians, media specialists, and public librarians who work with young people. Articles cover a wide variety of topics, with a focus on technology, multimedia, and other information resources that are likely to interest young learners. Reviews are classified by the target audience of the publications: preschool; schoolchildren to 4th grade, grades 5 and up, and teens; and professional librarians themselves ("professional reading"). Fiction, non-fiction, and reference books books are reviewed, as are graphic novels, multimedia, and digital resources.

== History ==
School Library Journal was founded by publisher R.R. Bowker in 1954, under the title Junior Libraries and by separation from its Library Journal. The first issue was published on September 15, 1954. Gertrude Wolff was the first editor.

Early in its history SLJ published nine issues each year, dated September to May and released on the fifteenth of each month. It now publishes monthly. In 2008 School Library Journal launched Series Made Simple, a twice-annual supplement which features reviews of series nonfiction books. It also releases a Best Books list annually.

R.R. Bowker sold SLJ and Library Journal in 1985 to Reed International (later merged into Reed Elsevier). In 2006 School Library Journal had a circulation of 38,000 subscribers and more than 100,000 readers. Reed sold the two journals in 2010 to Media Source Inc., owner of the Junior Library Guild and The Horn Book Magazine.

== Website ==
The School Library Journal website provides full access to every issue published from 1996 to the present, including the current issue. It also publishes several blogs and several e-newsletters including Curriculum Connections, SLJ Teen, and SLJ Extra Helping.

== See also ==
- List of literary journals
