= Henry Holt and Company =

American book-publishing company

- Parent company: Georg Von Holtzbrinck Publishing Group
- Founded: 1866; 160 years ago
- Founder: Henry Holt and Frederick Leypoldt
- Country of origin: United States
- Headquarters location: Equitable Building, 120 Broadway, New York City, U.S.
- Distribution: Macmillan (US); Melia Publishing Services (UK)
- Publication types: Books (Hardcover and Paperback)
- Nonfiction topics: Various
- Imprints: Henry Holt Books for Young Readers, Francis Coady, John Macrae, Metropolitan, Times, Godwin, Christy Ottaviano
- Official website: henryholt.com

Henry Holt and Company is an American book-publishing company based in New York City. One of the oldest publishers in the United States, it was founded in 1866 by Henry Holt and Frederick Leypoldt. The company publishes in the fields of American and international fiction, biography, history, politics, science, psychology, health, and children's literature. In the U.S., it operates under Macmillan Publishers.

== History ==
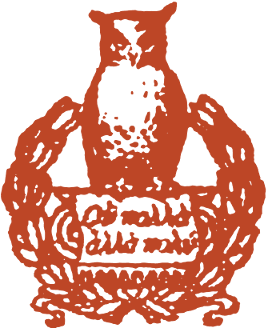
Logo of Henry Holt and Company as it appeared in the book In the Dwellings of the Wilderness by Charlotte Bryson Taylor in 1904

The company publishes under several imprints, including Metropolitan Books, Times Books, Owl Books, and Picador. It also publishes under the name of Holt Paperbacks.

The company has published works by renowned authors Erich Fromm, Paul Auster, Hilary Mantel, Robert Frost, Hermann Hesse, Norman Mailer, Herta Müller, Thomas Pynchon, Robert Louis Stevenson, Ivan Turgenev, and Noam Chomsky.

From 1951 to 1985, Holt published the magazine Field & Stream.

Holt merged with Rinehart & Company of New York and the John C. Winston Company of Philadelphia in 1960 to become Holt, Rinehart and Winston. The Wall Street Journal reported on March 1 that Holt stockholders had approved the merger, last of the three approvals. "Henry Holt is the surviving concern, but will be known as Holt, Rinehart, Winston, Inc."

CBS purchased the company in 1967, but in 1985, the group split, and the retail publishing arm, along with the Holt name, was sold to the Georg von Holtzbrinck Publishing Group based in Stuttgart, which has retained Holt as a subsidiary publishing under its original name and in the US it is part of Macmillan Publishers.

The educational publishing arm, which retained the Holt, Rinehart and Winston name, was sold to Harcourt.

== Book series ==
- Amateur Studies
- American Science Series
- The American Presidents Series
- English Readings
- Holt Spoken Language Series
- Leisure Hour Series
- Leisure Moment Series
- Library of Foreign Poetry
- The Makers of the Nineteenth Century (General editor: Basil Williams)

== See also ==
- Holt McDougal
- Books in the United States
