= Klas August Linderfelt =

American librarian (1847–1900)

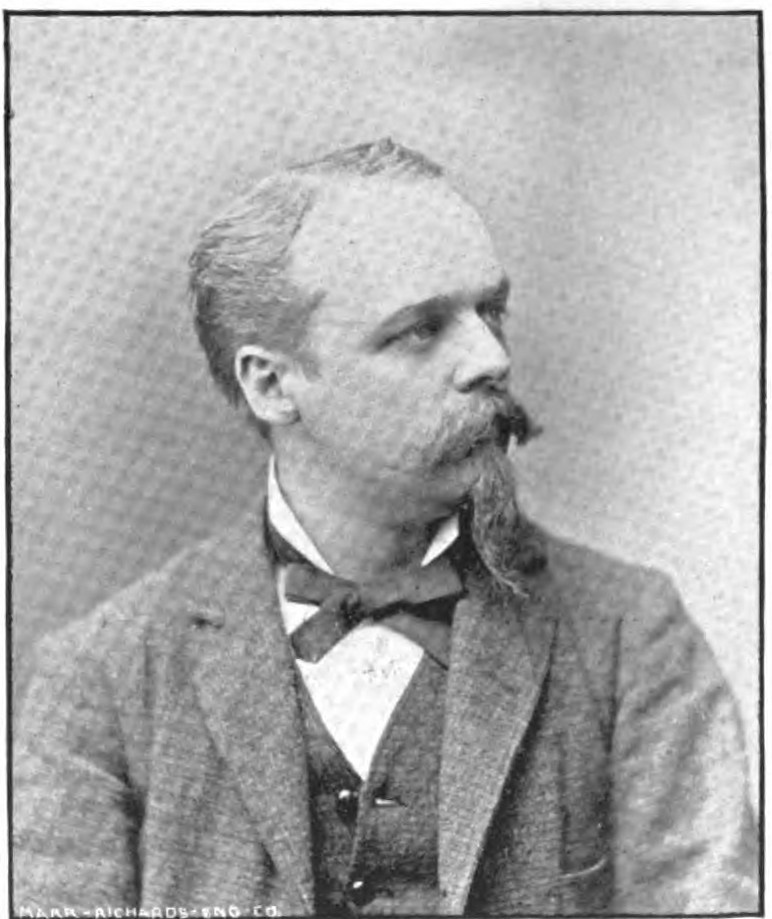
- Linderfelt in 1892

President of the American Library Association
- In office October 16, 1891 – May 22, 1892
- Preceded by: Samuel Swett Green
- Succeeded by: William Isaac Fletcher

Personal details
- Born: 1847 Sweden
- Died: March 18, 1900 (aged 52–53) Paris, France
- Children: 4, including Karl and Anna
- Education: Uppsala University
- Occupation: Librarian
- Criminal information
- Conviction: Embezzlement
- Penalty: Suspended sentence

Klas August Linderfelt (1847 – March 18, 1900) was an American librarian. A native of Sweden, he emigrated to Milwaukee, Wisconsin and became a teacher and a librarian. As the first librarian of the Milwaukee Public Library, he became a significant figure in the city and in the library profession, becoming the seventh President of the American Library Association. He left both the city and the profession permanently following his arrest for embezzlement.

== Early life and education ==
Linderfelt was born in Sweden in 1847. He became an orphan after the deaths of his mother when he was five and his father when he was eleven. Linderfelt persevered and earned a doctorate from Uppsala University. He emigrated to Milwaukee in 1870 and taught classics at Milwaukee College. In 1875, he was married to a woman whose name has been reported as Maggie Cooper or Margie E. Parker. By 1880 they had the first two of their four children, a son and daughter, and lived modestly at 278 Pleasant Street.

== Milwaukee Public Library ==
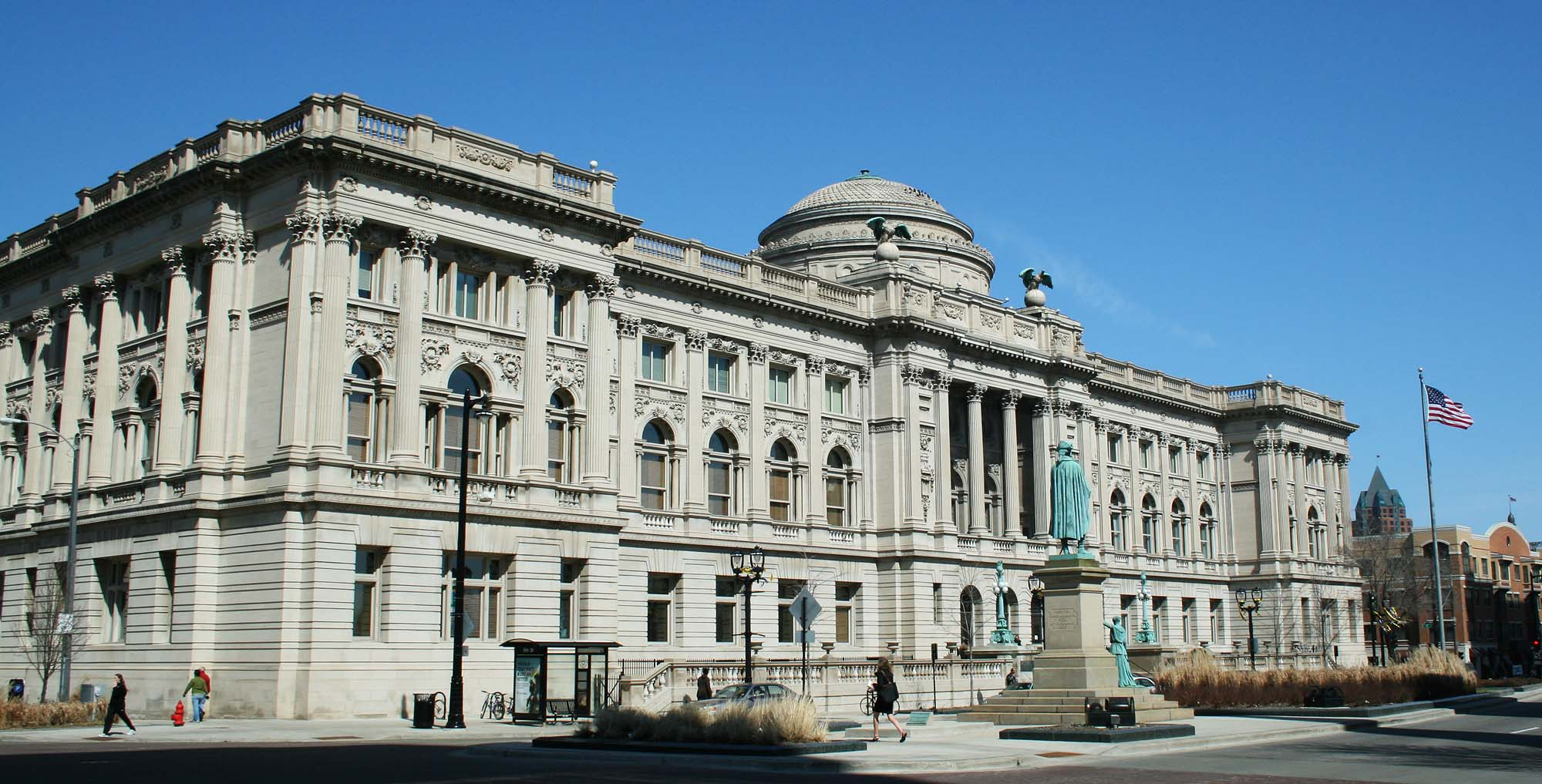
The Central Library of the Milwaukee Public Library.

The Milwaukee Public Library dates to February 7, 1878, when the Wisconsin State Legislature authorized the city to form a public library. Linderfelt had taken an interest in libraries and was hired to be its first librarian in 1880. With his new post, Linderfelt joined the ranks of Milwaukee's elite and his family took up residence on Grand Avenue. He also made the acquaintance of numerous important figures in the library profession, and was especially close to William Frederick Poole.

Under Linderfelt's leadership, the Milwaukee Public Library developed a new charging system and a pencil dater for due dates that was widely adopted by libraries. He wrote professional articles and his book Eclectic Card Catalog Rules, based on the work of Karl Dziatzko as well as numerous English language librarians like Melvil Dewey, was published by Charles Ammi Cutter in 1890. He also wrote on other topics, such as the book Volapük: An Easy Method of Acquiring the Universal Language (1888), about the constructed language.

Linderfelt was a founder and the first president of the Wisconsin Library Association in February 1891. He was active in the American Library Association, serving as a councilor from 1883 to 1891 and vice president from 1890 to 1891. He was instrumental in local arrangements for the ALA's 1886 annual conference in Milwaukee, including an eight-day, 1500 mile post-conference train excursion afterwards arranged by Linderfelt, which included a steamboat trip on the Dells of the Wisconsin River. In 1891, he was elected to follow Samuel Swett Green as president of the American Library Association.

Linderfelt's most significant achievement was the arrangements for the construction of a library and museum building at 814 Wisconsin Avenue. A national competition was held and 74 designs were proposed. One of the entrants was a 25-year-old Frank Lloyd Wright, whose entry was helpful in publicizing his blooming career. The winning entry was a neo-Renaissance structure from the Wisconsin architecture firm of Ferry & Clas, which was constructed at a cost of $780,000. It opened on October 3, 1898. Today, the building is still in use as the Milwaukee Public Library's Central Library and is listed on the National Register of Historic Places.

== Embezzlement charges ==
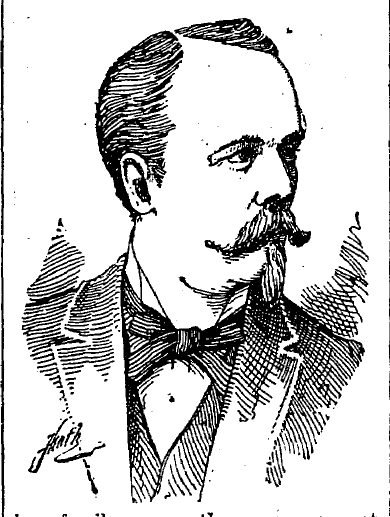
K.A. Linderfelt from the May 5, 1892 edition of the Milwaukee Sentinel

Beginning in at least 1883, Linderfelt began embezzling large sums of money from the Library, chiefly by double-billing the board for Library expenditures and pocketing the difference. He never provided a motive for his theft, but it was widely speculated, and argued by his lawyer, that the financial demands of Linderfelt's prestigious position in society were not met by his modest public salary.

He was first investigated in 1888 over a shortfall in the collection of library fines, but the missing money was reimbursed, reportedly by two members of the Library board of trustees, and the matter was dropped. However, following the revelation that Milwaukee School Board secretary A.H. Schattenberg had embezzled over $50,000, and his subsequent suicide, a citywide audit was conducted. City accountant Carl Jackwitz discovered Linderfelt had embezzled over $4,000 and following a meeting with some of the trustees, including Harrison Carroll Hobart and Mayor Peter J. Somers, Linderfelt confessed and was arrested on April 28, 1892.

The library profession was stunned by Linderfelt's arrest. The news was "a great shock", Green wrote later in his history of the profession. Green wrote to Poole: "I should have as soon suspected myself as Linderfelt" and others had similar reactions of disbelief. Many librarians wrote letters of support for Linderfelt. The ALA acted swiftly to mitigate the damage to the image of the profession. On May 22, the executive board of the ALA moved that William I. Fletcher be appointed president following Linderfelt's resignation, and that he be officially recorded as president retroactively for the entire term, essentially erasing Linderfelt from the historical record of the ALA. A month later, Melvil Dewey was elected ALA president for the next term. The incident was seen as a triumph of newer librarians like Dewey over the "old guard" represented by Poole, of whom Linderfelt was seen as a protege.

In Milwaukee, Linderfelt received strong support from members of the board of trustees and the city's elite, who pushed to reimburse the city and reinstate the librarian. However, local newspapers objected, especially following revelations of the previous investigation and that Linderfelt had stolen nearly twice as much as initially thought, over $9,000. On July 12, Linderfelt pleaded nolo contendere and Judge A. Scott Sloan, saying that "further punishment would be wrong", issued a suspended sentence. Linderfelt left Milwaukee that day for a promised job at the Library Bureau in Boston.

The lenient sentence was met with outrage in the city. Newspapers inveighed against the decision and residents held "indignation meetings" to agitate against it. Within days, upon the urging of Mayor Somers, the district attorney scrambled to find new charges to file against Linderfelt and ordered his arrest in Boston. But Linderfelt had already left Boston and was sighted in England later that month. Poole wrote: "They let him off without punishment, and are now chasing him around the world to arrest him for another trial."

== Later life ==
Linderfelt settled in Paris and studied medicine. His wife and children joined him there. At the end of his life, Linderfelt worked for the journal La Semaine Médicale. Instead of going to Paris, his eldest son, Karl E. Linderfelt, dropped out of Beloit College and lived with uncles in Cripple Creek, Colorado. He joined the Colorado National Guard and was one of the commanders at the Ludlow Massacre, noted for his aggression and profanity and for assaulting and allegedly murdering strike leader Louis Tikas.

His daughter Anna Linderfelt Fisher became a Red Cross worker during World War I, and an advisor to Faisal I of Iraq.

== Legacy ==
Linderfelt has been ignored or received cursory treatment in histories of both Milwaukee and the library profession in the United States, including the work of Linderfelt's immediate successor at the Milwaukee Public Library and longtime assistant Theresa Elmendorf. Noted library historian Wayne A. Wiegand wrote about Linderfelt in a two part article published in 1977 in American Libraries, the official magazine of the American Library Association. In the article, Wiegand expressed hope that librarians would remember Linderfelt "to provide some balance against the too-frequent eulogistic treatment accorded the Winsors, Pooles, and Deweys of library history" and that the ALA would officially acknowledge Linderfelt as a past ALA President for the sake of "historical accuracy". A librarian responding to Wiegand's article echoed his sentiments, noting Linderfelt's absence in the Dictionary of American Biography and the National Cyclopedia of American Biography and Wiegand's upcoming article about Linderfelt for the Dictionary of American Library Biography. As of 2015, Linderfelt has not appeared on the official list of past ALA presidents.

In 1991, the centennial of the founding of the Wisconsin Library Association, former WLA presidents began the tradition of annually passing an urn with non-human ashes representing Linderfelt to each president at the end of their term. Linderfelt was inducted into the Wisconsin Library Hall of Fame in 2009.

Non-profit organization positions
Preceded by Samuel Swett Green	President of the American Library Association; 1891–1892	Succeeded by William Isaac Fletcher
