= Media source =

Media source or MediaSource may refer to:

- Mass media, media used by the public as sources of information and entertainment
- Source (journalism), an entity used as source of information
- Media Source Inc. (d.b.a. MSI Information Services), American publishing company
- Media Source Extensions (MSE), a W3C specification for using delivering digital media
- Media server, a device or application that makes digital media available over a network
