= A.L.A. Catalog =

Public library catalog

A.L.A. catalog : 8000 volumes for a popular library, with notes. 1904

The A.L.A. Catalog is the first general book selection guide cooperatively prepared for use by American public libraries.

== Background ==
In the early stage of public libraries’ development, book selection is the job of library committee composed of library director and trustees rather than librarians. However, there might be problems for the committee to reach an agreement on which book should be include/exclude for their libraries due to the following two reasons: Firstly, the committee members might be different in terms of education background and personal interests, therefore, they might come up with “different theories of what the library shall be”. Secondly, even without the disagreement of theories, it is impossible for committee members to have an adequate knowledge of “books, editions, and prices, outside of their own line of reading.” Thus they need the assistance from experts to revise and complete their booklist for libraries.

== Dewey and the Catalog ==
The A.L.A. Catalog, also known as the Catalog of A.L.A. Library, as one of the most popular booklists developed by experts, is the “first general book selection guide cooperatively prepared for use by American public libraries.” Before the development of the catalog, Melvil Dewey first promoted the idea of a universal library collection guide in an article “The Coming Catalogue” in Library Journal in 1877. He suggested a co-operative way for creating the collection guide among library committee, field specialist, as well as authors, for the reason that “no one person living unites in himself the wisdom necessary to make the best notes on all the books of the library”, and “not one but many minds must contribute to the work [of book selection].” Dewey also suggested American Library Association (A.L.A) appoints a committee to take “entire charge” of the “coming catalogue”. The primary usage of such catalogue would be “as a guide in the purchase of books for either private or public collection; as the main catalog of many of these libraries.”

Based on Dewey's article, A.L.A. began to take steps of creating such catalog. In November 1878, A.L.A. appointed five people as the committee in charge of the catalog. They decided to adopt a classified arrangement of the catalog. The catalog was planned to be about 250 pages with a fixed price of $2.50. After years’ cession of catalog development, Dewey attempted to restart his plan for A.L.A. catalog when he worked at Columbia College as the “Librarian in Chief” in 1883. He tried to obtain suggestion from Columbia faculty members through their lectures on “bibliography and literature in their areas of expertise” when the Columbia College School of Library Economy was established in 1887, and later Dewey moved to University of the State of New York in 1888, where he continued his work on catalog by asking his library employees and students in Albany to compile the catalog through scholarly journals. The Catalog was finally published and promoted in the A.L.A. annual conference in 1893 at the Chicago World's Fair. The 1893 Catalog of A.L.A. library provides a list of 5000 “best reading selections” that were “approved by distinguished specialists in various lines and organized by librarians into two separate classification schemes”.
