= Robert Freeman Asleson =

Robert Freeman Asleson (October 11, 1935 – July 22, 2010) was an American publisher who was a major contributor to the publishing, library and information industries. He led a number of information companies as they evolved from print, to microfilm, to mainframe, to CD-ROM and then eventually to web based databases. He also brought professional management to entrepreneurial library companies.

== Biography ==
Asleson was born in New Ulm, Minnesota, to Raymond Asleson and Florence Elvina Anderson. Three of his four grandparents were Norwegian emigrants. He attended the University of Minnesota, receiving a bachelor's degree followed by a master's degree in industrial engineering in 1958. In 1961, he received a law degree from George Washington University Law School. He also served in the Navy ROTC during college and was on active duty from 1958 to 1961.

His connection with the information industry began in 1961 as a sales representative with the Xerox Corporation. In 1964, he became Manager of Sales Promotion at University Microfilms International (UMI) which had been acquired by Xerox in 1961. UMI was a pioneer in the field of micropublishing. In 1990 Eugene B. Power, the founder of UMI, acknowledged Asleson's pioneering role in setting up sales and marketing for the company. In 1967, Asleson became president of UMI. The company later became ProQuest. It became one of the largest vendors in the field.

In 1976 Asleson left UMI to become president of R.R. Bowker, a reference-book publisher in New York. As the publisher of Books-in-Print and Serials-in-Print Bowker held a role in cataloging publishing output. This corporation now trades also under the ProQuest brand.

From 1980 to 1982 he led Information Handling Services, a Colorado-based vendor of business information . At that time it was close to becoming the world's largest commercial producer of microfilm with nearly 3 million feet of material. IHS remains a major player in electronic publishing.

In 1988 he became President of The Library Corporation (TLC), an Inwood, West Virginia based library automation company.

In 2001, he became chairman at Paratext, LLC. an electronic publisher of research databases in history, documents, scholarly reference and classical studies. Together with Eric M. Calaluca he developed a number of innovative reference products.

From 1988 to 2010, Asleson served as president of The Redalen Group. He later co-founded the Children's Literature Comprehensive Database.

He was chairman of the board of directors of the Information Industry Association (1979). He was a member of the board of the National Micrographics Association (now part of AIIM), where he received a Distinguished Service Award in 1977. He was a member of the National Advisory Board for the Library of Congress's Center for the Book and the National Commission on Libraries and Information Science: Task Force on Public and Private Sector. He was active in the creation of major library protocols and standards, including Z39.50. He attended the White House Conference on Library and Information Services in 1979.

He wrote and lectured extensively on the evolution of the information industry and in particular on the transition from micropublishing to electronic databases.

Asleson died in 2010 of prostate cancer at his home in Bethesda.
