= Anna L. Fisher =

American Red Cross worker (1878–1939)

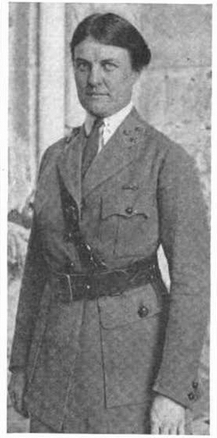
Anna L. Fisher, from a 1921 publication.

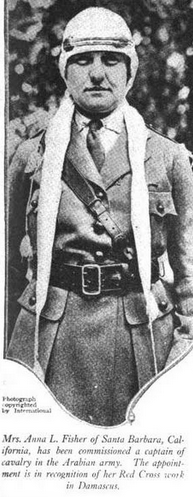
Anna L. Fisher in uniform and headdress, from a 1920 publication.

Anna Linderfelt Fisher (1878 – October 17, 1939) was an American Red Cross worker who ran an orphanage in Damascus. She was an advisor to Faisal I of Iraq in the short-lived Arab Kingdom of Syria in 1920, and held the rank of captain in the Syrian army. In 1927 she was appointed to the Ministry of Education in Iraq.

== Early life ==
Anna Linderfelt (or Linderfeldt) Fisher was born in Milwaukee, but was often described as being from New York, or from California, either Pasadena or Santa Barbara, depending on the source. She was the daughter of Swedish-born librarian Klas August Linderfelt and Margaret Eliza Parker Linderfelt. Her elder brother, Karl Linderfelt, was a Colorado National Guardsman involved in the Ludlow Massacre. Anna Linderfelt was educated in Paris.

== Career ==
During World War I, Fisher joined the Red Cross to do relief work in France, and later moved to working in Damascus. In 1919, she held the rank of captain in the Syrian army. She was described as "unofficial ruler of the Arab Kingdom of Syria", in reference to her role as advisor to Faisal I of Iraq. She organized schools, encouraged the development of traditional handicrafts, and ran the American Red Cross orphanage in Damascus.

From 1922 to 1927, she was in New York City, managing the restaurant at the Metropolitan Museum of Art. She also donated art objects to the museum during this period. Soon after she resigned from that position, Fisher was appointed an attache to Iraq's Ministry of Education, based in Baghdad. In 1933, the year Faisal died, she published a reminiscence, "My Memories of King Faisal", in Asia magazine.

== Personal life ==
Anna Linderfelt was engaged to architect Oswald Constantin Hering IV in 1900, while she was living in Paris. She married mining engineer William Bowditch Fisher after 1901. The couple lived in Boston and wintered in Santa Barbara, but they were living in Paris before World War I. They had a daughter, Frances Fisher (later Collins), born in Idaho in 1907. Anna L. Fisher died in 1939, at her daughter's home in Millbrook, New York, aged 61 years.
