= Katharin Dewey =

American bobsledder

Katharin “Kay” Dewey Martin (November 17, 1917 – December 18, 1997) was an American bobsledder.

== Early life ==
She was the daughter of Godfrey Dewey, president of the Lake Placid Organizing Committee and a winter sports facility designer.

== Career ==
At age 24 Dewey piloted a bobsleigh alongside male brakemen and won the 1940 US Championships. Following that the United States Bobsled and Skeleton Federation issued a statement saying "Bobsledding, since its inception a stronghold of male sport, bowed Monday to femininity" and subsequently banned women from competing. The federation later inducted her into the hall of fame in 2014 “for paving the way for women to compete in the sport".

She retired from the sport to become head nurse of the urology department at St. Luke's Hospital.
