= William I. Fletcher =

American librarian (1844–1917)

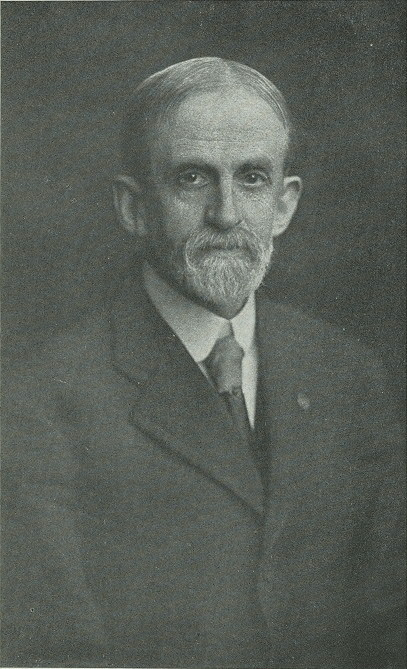

President of the American Library Association
- In office 1892
- Preceded by: Klas August Linderfelt
- Succeeded by: Melvil Dewey

Personal details
- Born: William Isaac Fletcher; April 23, 1844 Burlington, Vermont, United States
- Died: June 15, 1917 (aged 73)
- Occupation: Librarian

William Isaac Fletcher (April 23, 1844 – June 15, 1917) was an American librarian, bibliographer, and indexer who served as the head librarian of Amherst College from 1883 to 1911 and the President of the American Library Association in 1891–92. In 1951, he was named by Library Journal to the Library Hall of Fame.

== Background ==
Born in Burlington, Vermont, Fletcher grew up in Winchester, Massachusetts. After working as the Winchester town librarian in his teens, he got a job at the Boston Athenaeum when he was 18, working there under William Frederick Poole for five years. After a decade and a half of working at several other libraries in Massachusetts and Connecticut, Fletcher was hired by Amherst in November 1883.

His contribution as the Amherst Librarian and ALA President is recorded in Pioneers in librarianship (2022).

== Poole's Index to Periodical Literature ==
Fletcher served as the editor of four supplements (1893, 1897, 1903, and 1908) of the Poole's Index to Periodical Literature as well as of the 1893 and 1901 editions of the ALA Index to General Literature.

Non-profit organization positions
Preceded by Klas August Linderfelt	President of the American Library Association; 1892	Succeeded by Melvil Dewey
