= Who's Who in American Art =

Who's Who in American Art is a biographical hardcover directory of noteworthy individuals in the visual arts community in the United States, published by Marquis Who's Who, formerly by R. R. Bowker Publishing. The directory has also listed some individuals from Canada and Mexico, plus some American artists and arts professionals currently residing in other countries. The latest edition includes 11,000 biographies of artists, critics, curators, administrators, librarians, historians, collectors, educators, dealers, and conservators, of whom 9,000 are artists. The individuals featured in new 36th edition were obtained from nominations provided by current entrants, art associations, galleries and museums or from citations in professional publications. In many cases, though, the names are collected independently by Marquis research and editorial staffs, which use a wide assortment of tools to gather the most complete, accurate, and up-to-date information available.

== History ==
The first edition of the publication was released by the American Federation of Arts in 1940 under the title ' Biographical Dictionary of Contemporary American Artists. It contained a Preface, Abbreviations, Biographies, Obituaries, and a Classified Geographical Index. Who's Who in American Art was published for many years by R. R. Bowker Publishing up to and including the 20th edition. It has since been published by Marquis Who's Who, beginning with the 21st edition. In November 2006, Marquis released the 27th edition, titled Who's Who in American Art 2007–2008. The 31st edition is scheduled for release in November 2011 and includes 11,000 artists.
