= Natale Battezzati =

Natale Battezzatti
- Born: 1818; Milan, Italy
- Died: May 3, 1882 (aged 63–64); Milan, Italy
- Occupations: printer, publisher

Natale Battezzati (1818–1882) was a printer and publishing house owner in Milan, Italy in the mid- and late 19th-century. He was a founding member of the Italian book-trade society, Associazione tipografico-libraria italiana, and developed a card catalog system for booksellers that influenced American librarianship.

== Professional life ==
Natale Battezzati began working in printing early in his life, and formed a printing and publishing house that produced a variety of significant works, including Storia del Parlamento subalpino by A. Brofferio and the Annuario storico italiano.

Battezzati was involved with the Associazione tipografico-libraria italiana from its beginning in 1869 as an elected member of the board. He proposed, in 1871, a standardized card system that could be used by booksellers to create an in-store catalog of books currently on offer by Italian presses. The system was demonstrated at the Vienna Exposition in 1873, and again in Milan at the 1879 exhibition of typographical arts. At this latter he was awarded honors for this invention. He also developed standards for noting book prices and for calculating shipping fees for books ordered from the publisher.

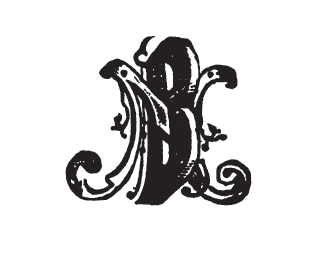
Printer's mark of N Battezzati

== Battezzati's card system ==
At the time that he proposed his card system, booksellers had only the bi-monthly publication of the trade association newsletter to provide a list of books available from Italian publishers. At the meeting of the Associazione libraria italiana on September 18, 1871, cav. Giuseppe Pomba proposed the development of a "book emporium" to improve distribution and service at many different levels of the book trade. Natale Battezzati, association member and owner of a publishing house in Milan, used this opportunity to make some proposals: a series of warehouses and middlemen in the major cities; a unified publicity system; and "… the adoption of a card system which would serve as the announcement of new publications, as a mail order form, and a cumulative supplement to the publishers' catalogs, and which can be ordered by subject and alphabetically…". The cards would be used to create a complete catalog of available books by author and by subject in each bookstore, linked by its number to the national bibliography, "Bibliografia Italiana". Booksellers would be able to answer requests from customers without the need to leaf through the lists in the separate issues of the Bibliografia.

Each publisher would print cards representing their books and journals. The cards themselves would be reprints of the title page of the publication on heavy paper. The publisher's name would be printed on the left side of the card; the author across the top; and the subject of the work, using a modified form of the classification system developed by Jacques Charles Brunet, along the right-hand edge. Since most title pages carried a fair amount of white space, there remained room for additional information such as a table of contents or a summary of the work.

Battezzati presented his card system proposal at a meeting of Italian booksellers in Naples in 1871 and again at the 1873 Vienna World's Fair.

In a pamphlet on the Milan Exposition of 1881, Battezzati included a list of nearly one hundred Italian publishers using his card system. However, after Battezzati's death in 1882, the card system receives no further mention and perhaps, having lost its main proponent, fell from use.

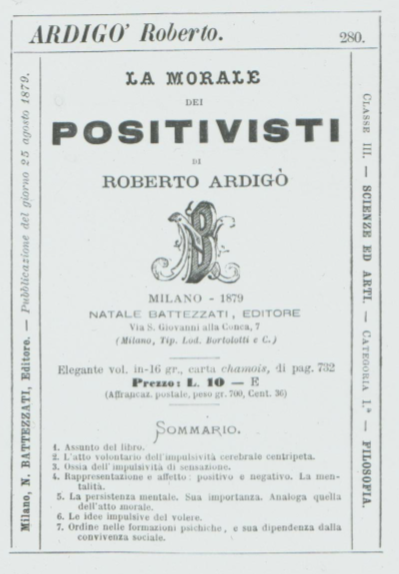
Sample card from Natale Battezzati's card system, 1871

== Battezzati and Dewey ==
In each of the first fourteen editions of the Dewey Decimal System, Melvil Dewey included a short acknowledgment of Battezzati and his catalog system:

"Perhaps the most fruitful source of ideas was the Nuovo sistema di Catalogo Bibliografico Generale of Natale Battezzati, of Milan. Certainly he [Dewey] is indebted to this system adopted by the Italian publishers in 1871, though he has copied nothing from it."

Exactly what Dewey took from Battezzati's system is not clear. Battezzati's system used Roman numerals to indicate topics, not decimals. John Comaromi, an historian of Dewey's system, calls the reference to Battezzati in the classification a "red herring." However, Marjorie Hlava interprets Dewey's acknowledgment of Battezzati's system to be evidence of the iterative development of information science.

It is also not obvious how and where Dewey encountered Battezzati's system. Battezzati himself states that:

"... the system was studied and admired by Mr. Melvil Dewey of Boston, secretary of the Association of American 'Libraj' at the Vienna Exposition of 1873..."

and that the system was adopted in America using the term "Title-slips." There are a number of things wrong with Battezzati's statement. Dewey was not at the Vienna Exposition, but perhaps was alerted to it by others who were there. It is clear that he wrote to Battezzati as he is quoted by Battezzati as saying that he had never seen "such a beautiful proposal." The other thing that Battezzati gets wrong is that he translated "American Library Association" into "Associazione dei Libraj d'America," which means "American Booksellers' Association."
