= Rolf Monsen =

American ski jumper (1899–1987)

Rolf Monsen (January 8, 1899 – April 28, 1987) was an American Olympic skier.

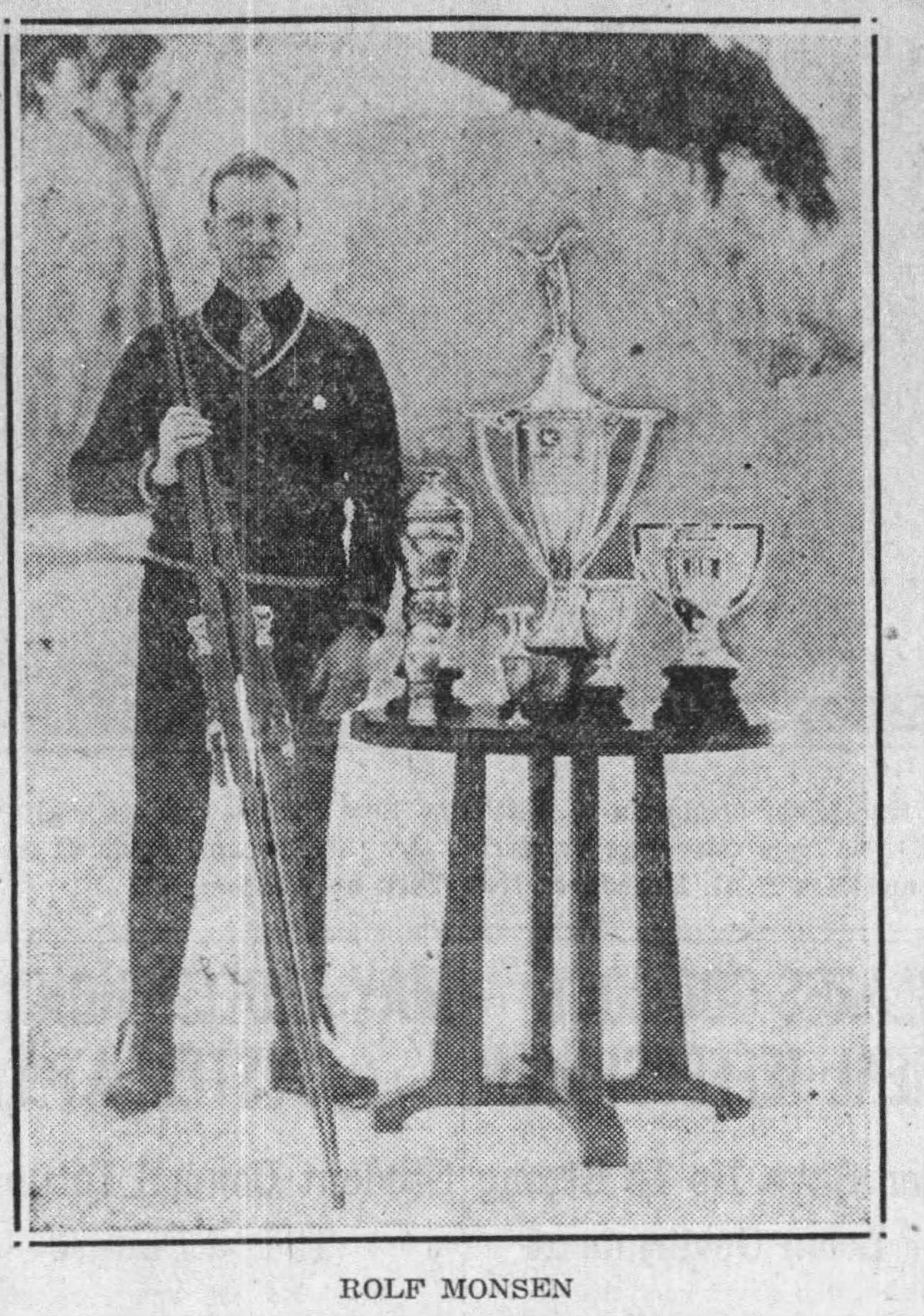
Monsen in 1928

Rolf Monsen was born in Oslo, Norway. He competed in ski jumping, cross-country skiing, and Nordic combined. He was a member of three U.S. Olympic teams, 1928, 1932 and 1936. His best Olympic result was at the 1928 Winter Olympics in St. Moritz, where he placed sixth in ski jumping. Although unable to compete due to an injury, he was chosen to be the U.S. Team flag bearer at the 1936 Olympic Games.

During World War II, he worked with the United States Department of Defense to help train Ski Troops at the 10th Mountain Division. He later helped to promote skiing as at the Sugarbush Resort in Warren, Vermont. He was elected to the National Ski Hall of Fame in 1964.

== Related Reading ==
- Baumgardner, Randy W. (1998) 10th Mountain Division (Turner Publishing Company) ISBN 978-1-56311-430-4
- Feuer, A.B. (2006) Packs On!: Memoirs of the 10th Mountain Division in World War II (Stackpole Books) ISBN 978-0-8117-3289-5
- Pushies, Fred (2008) 10th Mountain Division Zenith Press) ISBN 978-0-7603-3349-5
- Shelton, Peter (2003) Climb to Conquer: The Untold Story of WWII's 10th Mountain Division Ski Troops (Scribner) ISBN 978-0-7432-2606-6

Olympic Games
Preceded by Morgan Taylor	Flagbearer for the United States; Garmisch-Partenkirchen 1936	Succeeded by Al Jochim
