= Bowker's Law Books and Serials in Print =

Bowker's Law Books and Serials in Print is a descriptive legal bibliography, and is one of the two main publications of this type. Law libraries often use it as an aid to collection development. It is a "standard reference work". It is "irresistible". It is complemented by International Legal Books in Print. It is published by R. R. Bowker.

== Sources ==
- Editions:La21_QklGBcC - digitized copies in snippet view from Google Books.
- 80 Law Library Journal 340.
- Yirka, Carl. "Best Legal Reference Books" (1989) 81 Law Library Journal 305 at 309 and 328 and 329.
- Pagel, Scott B. "The Legal Bibliography and User Needs" (1989) 81 Law Library Journal 387 at 426.
- Miller, Ellen J. "The Video Collection: Selection and Evaluation". 85 Law Library Journal 591 at 592.
