= Karl Linderfelt =

American soldier

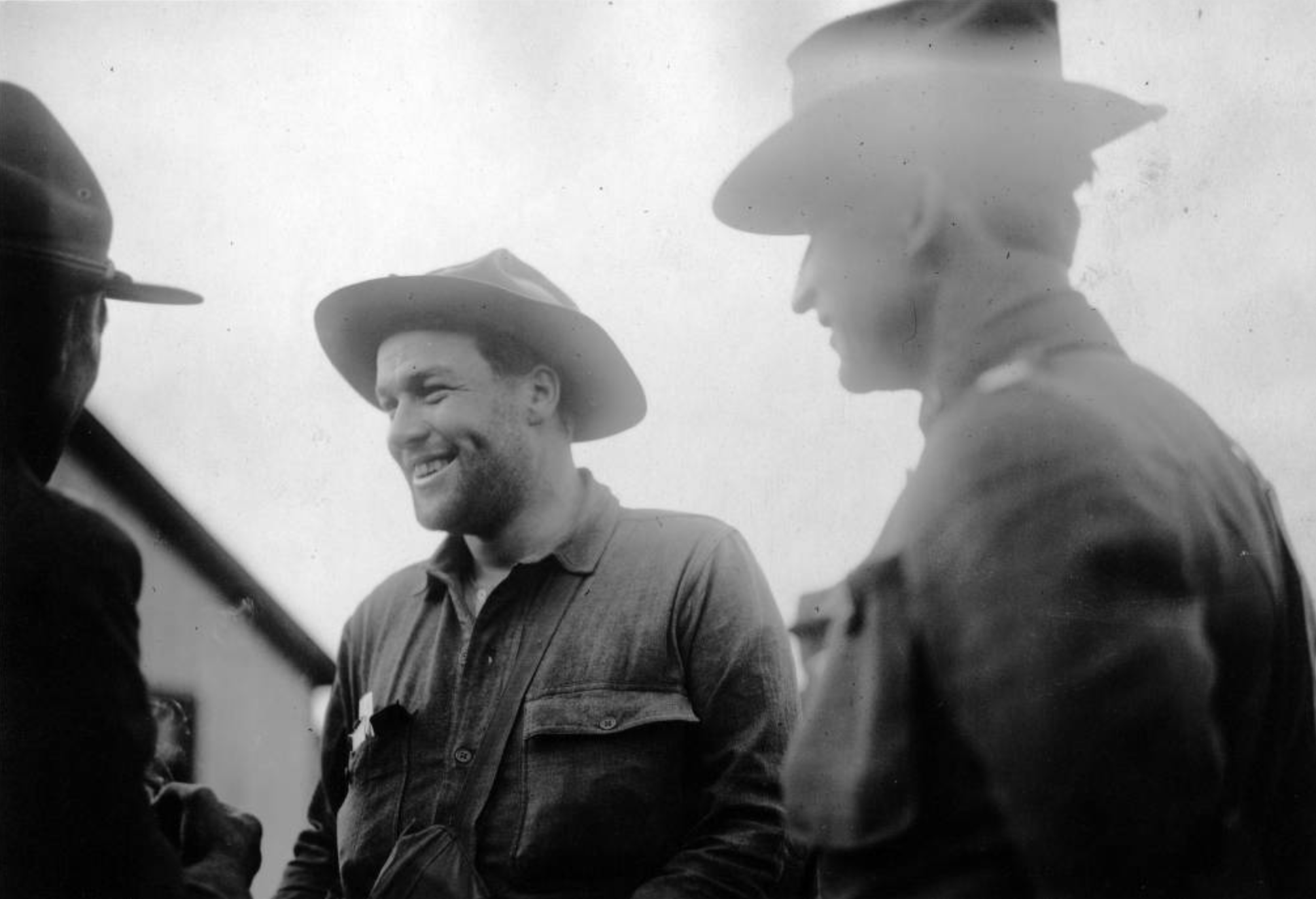
- Lt. Linderfelt (center) near the Ludlow Colony, 1914.
- Born: Karl Edward Linderfelt; 7 November 1876; Janesville, Wisconsin
- Died: 3 June 1957 (aged 80); Los Angeles, California
- Burial place: Los Angeles National Cemetery, Los Angeles, California
- Spouse: Ora Smith (m. 1905)
- Military career
- Allegiance: United States, Mexico
- Branch: United States Army; Mexican Army; United States Army National Guard
- Rank: Colonel (Colorado National Guard)
- Unit: Colorado National Guard
- Conflicts: Spanish–American War; Philippine–American War; Boxer Rebellion^{[note]}; Colorado Coalfield War; Ludlow Massacre
- Other work: Miner

Karl E. Linderfelt (November 7, 1876 – June 3, 1957) was a soldier, mine worker, soldier of fortune, and officer in the Colorado National Guard. He was reported to have been responsible for an attack upon, and the ultimate death of, strike leader Louis Tikas during the Ludlow Massacre. He was the son of librarian Klas August Linderfelt.

Most of what is known from Linderfelt's life is from a congressional testimony after the events at Ludlow.

== Early life ==
Linderfelt was originally from rural Wisconsin. His father immigrated from Sweden after obtaining a doctorate and his mother was a Vermont native. His sister was Anna L. Fisher, a Red Cross worker in World War I and an advisor to Faisal I of Iraq.

== Military career ==
Karl Linderfelt enlisted in the Cavalry of the Colorado National Guard at the age of 21, after a life-long interest in the military, exemplified by several youth cadet groups. He transferred to Jacksonville, Florida and also served in California before being transferred to the Philippines by 1899 during the Philippine–American War. He returned to the US after time in China in 1901 and by 1903 had reenlisted to his original troop of the Colorado National Guard. By 1906 he had risen to the rank of second lieutenant. Additionally, Linderfelt also served with the Mexican Army and was discharged in 1911

== Civilian life ==
At the time of his testimony Linderfelt had been in the mining business in Colorado for 21 years. Linderfelt had worked in Cripple Creek on and off since he was 17. He never finished high school, but often claimed to have spent some time in college, while ignoring the fact that this was a program in his prep school. Linderfelt married Ora Smith in Teller County, Colorado on 2 May 1905. He also stated that his father was a professor at his college, although there are no records of this. Linderfelt was working as a mine guard in Cripple Creek at the time of the beginning of the 1913 Southern Colorado Coal Field strike.

== Time Preceding Ludlow Massacre ==
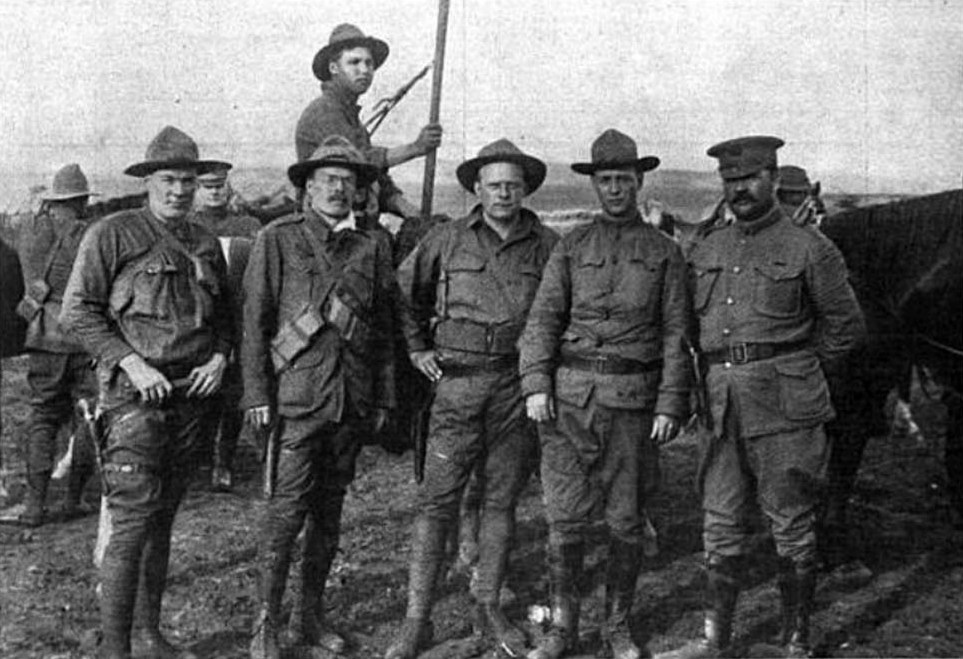
Karl Linderfelt, center.

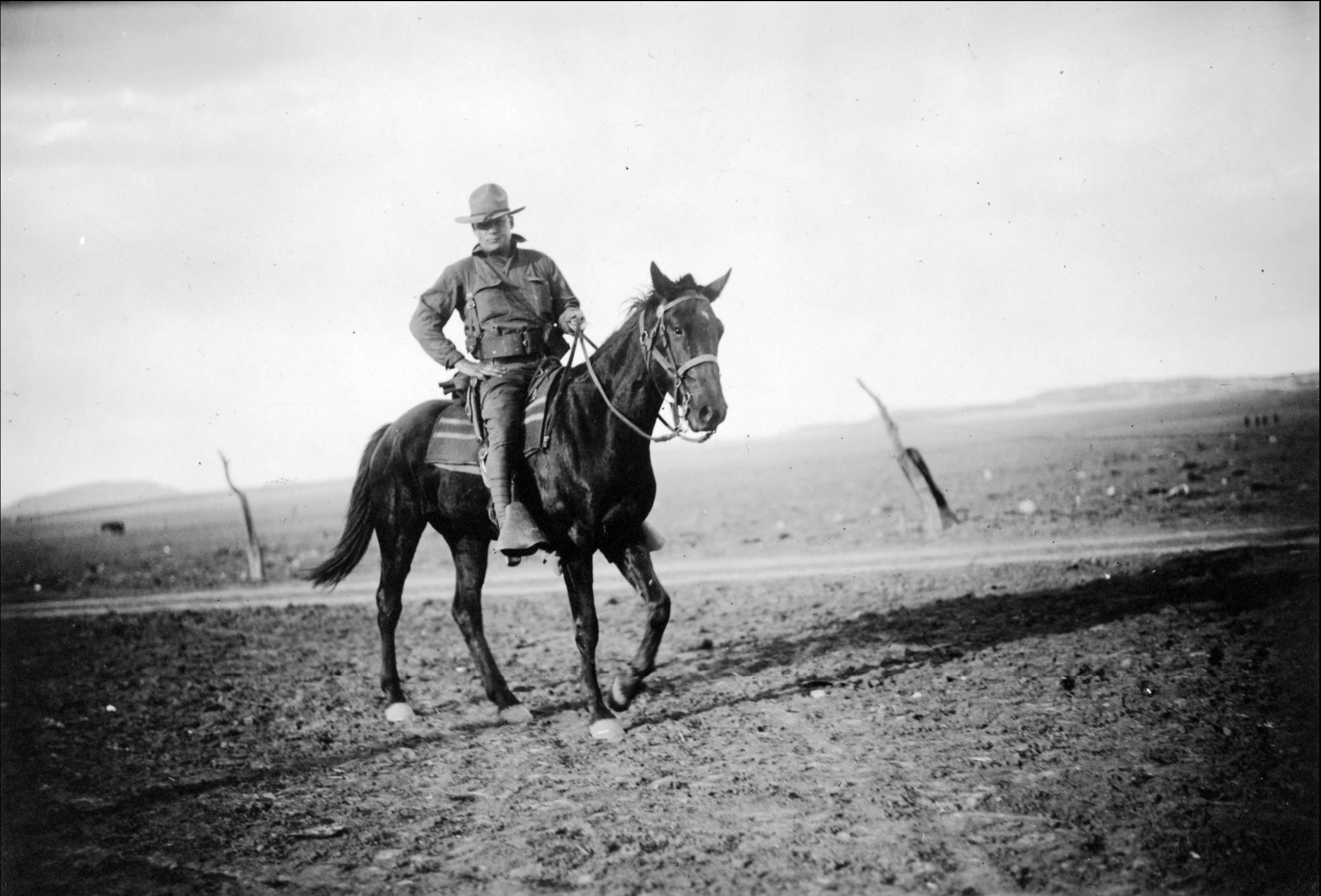
Linderfelt near Ludlow, 1914.

Upon his persistent requests to General Chase, with whom he had worked in the Northern Coal Field Strikes, he served as the deputy sheriff at Ludlow for two weeks before the militia was called in. He was placed by the sheriff and, according to him, was instructed to arrest anyone who caused trouble, strikers or guards. Before the Colorado National Guard was called to the strikes, Linderfelt was involved in a battle centralized in Berwind Canyon. Under the impression that martial law had been declared, Linderfelt took military command. Armed conflict continued between the Colorado Fuel and Iron sponsored sheriffs in the area and the strikers until a small national guard unit was deployed and ambushed the strikers with machine guns. Linderfelt began running his portion of the Colorado National Guard throughout the Ludlow, Berwind and Hastings area even though the guard had not yet been officially sent into the situation. This mostly included illegal searches of private local homes for ammunition.

The situation in Berwind Canyon was the first blurring of the Colorado National Guard and mine officials in the 1913 Southern Colorado Coal Field Strikes. By the time of official guard involvement Linderfelt commanded both deputy sheriffs, many of which had Baldwin-Felts affiliations, and National Guardsmen from the Berwind battle all as Company B.

== Character ==
Linderfelt is described by the congressional testimony of Brewster, a University of Colorado law professor, as a brutal man who took pleasure in the spray of the machine gun over the colony. He even personally beat a boy trying to take the train from Ludlow to Trinidad. The lawyer was so concerned that he contacted the governor for immediate suspension of Linderfelt. The professor establishes Linderfelt's involvement by saying that if Linderfelt had been removed, as he requested, the events at Ludlow would have never occurred. These character claims were backed up by other people involved in the strike, including Capt. Van Cise, a guardsmen himself. Van Cise purposely kept Linderfelt's company stationed away from Ludlow during the beginning of the strike because of his concerns.

== Life after Ludlow ==
While Linderfelt was found responsible for the deaths of Tikas and other strikers that exhibited execution-style injuries, he and all others were acquitted. Linderfelt admitted to striking Tikas with his Springfield rifle. The military court found Linderfelt guilty of the assault on Tikas, "but attach[ed] no criminality" to his actions.

== Notes ==
1. ^1 Federal records substantiate Linderfelt's military career with the exception of his involvement in the Boxer Rebellion, which is based on his claim of participating in the combat at Taku.
