= Richard Rogers Bowker =

American publisher, editor, journalist (1848–1933)

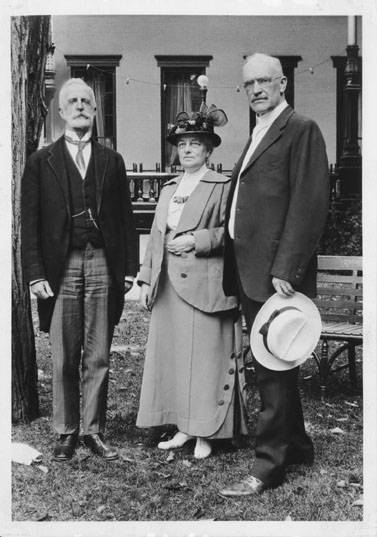
Bowker, Mrs. Dewey, and Melvil Dewey in Saratoga Springs, New York in 1918

Richard Rogers Bowker (September 4, 1848 – November 12, 1933) was an American journalist and businessman who was an editor of Publishers Weekly and Harper's Magazine, and a founder of the R. R. Bowker Company.

== Early life and education ==
Richard Rogers Bowker was born in Salem, Massachusetts, on September 4, 1848, to a successful, educated family.

His paternal grandfather, Joel Bowker (1775–1858) rose from a grocery clerk to a leading merchant and part owner of sailing vessels. Bowker Place in Salem is named after Joel Bowker.

His mother, Theresa Maria Bowker (née Savory; 1825–1906), was the daughter of Richard Savory (1781–1841), who owned a large cooperage in Salem. His father, Daniel Rogers Bowker (1820–1895), was a partner in a prestigious business enterprise involving the sale of coal and salt in Salem until the financial panic in 1857, coupled with the death of the leading partner in the business, caused the business to fail.

The family moved to New York City, where Bowker's father started a barrel-making business. The business never prospered, so the family never regained the affluence it had enjoyed. The plan for Bowker to attend Harvard University had to be scrapped. He attended the Free School in 1863 and entered the City College of New York in 1866.

At City College, he founded, edited, managed and published The Collegian, one of the first college newspapers in the country. He was an organizer and member of the student senate. Bowker was instrumental in establishing a chapter of Phi Beta Kappa at the college, but was blackballed from membership by the school's president for his "radical" activities in student government and the student newspaper. Years later the injustice was corrected. In 1868, he graduated with a B.A. in journalism.

In 1879, as a City College student, he was a leading member of the independent Republican Movement, also known as the "Mugwump" movement in national politics. In 1880 the Mugwumps helped defeat the nomination of Ulysses Grant for a third term because of the scandals during his administrations.

In 1880, he founded the Society for Political Education to inform the public on social and political issues. He was a liberal Republican who played a leading role in enacting of civil service and municipal reforms in New York in the 1880s and in 1880 wrote the civil service reform plank that was adopted in the national Republican platform.

== Career ==
After graduation Bowker began his successful career in journalism at the newly established New York Evening Mail where he was city editor and literary editor from 1868 to 1874. From 1875 to 1878 he wrote a column for the New York Tribune and became manager of The New York Times in 1896. Between 1880 and 1882 he lived in London and managed the British edition of Harper's Magazine.

In addition to journalism, he also became involved in publishing and book sales. He assisted in organizing the first American Book Trade Show and was hired by prestigious London and New York publishers as their representatives at various times. In 1872 Bowker and his friend and mentor, Frederick Leypoldt, began publishing the Publishers Weekly (then The Publishers' Weekly), which became the most important book-trade journal in America. Bowker served as an owner and editor of the publication for 50 years.

In May 1876, Bowker, Leypoldt, and Melvil Dewey met in New York City to discuss the development of libraries. At the time the country had 3,647 libraries with 300 or more books.

The number of books in these libraries totaled 12,276,964. The libraries operated on a subscription basis with no access to shelves and no children's sections. No uniform system for classifying books existed. Libraries were shifting from bound-volume catalogues to hand-written catalogue cards of varied sizes. At the meeting the three men agreed to establish a library profession, to publish a library journal and to organize a national library association.

In September 1876, Leypoldt and Bowker published volume one of the Library Journal. Melvil Dewey was the managing editor of the journal. They organized the American Library Association in October 1876. The organization would be used as a model for many European countries. After a few years, Dewey left the publication for financial and personal reasons. Bowker remained the heart and soul of the publication for many years despite its lack of financial success. He not only wrote regular editorials, but also numerous essays on library history, organization and management for the publication.

== Death and legacy ==
In March 1884, Leypoldt died. Despite the fact that Leypoldt's bibliography project had been a time-consuming, financial loss, Bowker, a chairman of the Committee on Public Documents of the American Library Association, took on the responsibility for the American Catalogue. an index of all books published in the United States. He added three new features: United States government documents, publications of American literary, scientific and other societies, and state government publications. During the next fifteen years, he published a revised edition of the catalogue every five years.

Bowker was instrumental in efforts to have Herbert Putnam appointed Librarian of Congress. The magnificent record of the nation's foremost library during the following decades was in no small measure due to Putnam's admirable leadership, and Bowker could take just pride in the part he played in bringing this about," McClung Fleming wrote in 1952.

More than once, he was asked to be president of the American Library Association. But he declined because he thought it would be inappropriate, since he was not a librarian. He was a member of the Association's Council from 1898–1902; 1907–1923 and 1929–1933. He regularly attended association conferences. He was recognized with American Library Association Honorary Membership in 1933, an award conferred on an individual whose contribution to librarianship is so outstanding that it is of lasting importance to the advancement of the whole field of library service.

In 1885, Bowker helped organize and was the first president of the New York Library Club. He served as a trustee for the Brooklyn Public Library from its incorporation in 1902 until his death and gave most of his personal library to it. For 24 years, he served as president of the Stockbridge Library Association in Massachusetts. He donated ten thousand dollars to the Library of Congress for bibliographical services. It was written of Bowker that, "few in the library world had wider acquaintance, few had more lasting friendships, few were more generous in recognition of new talent, few more cherishing of old memories." All of this and more earned Bowker a spot as one of the “100…most important leaders we had in the 20th century.”

== Personal life ==
On January 1, 1902, Bowker married Alice G. Mitchell (1864–1941) in Brookline, Massachusetts. Alice's mother, Zilpha Maria Mitchell (née Morton; 1834–1888) was a first cousin of Levi Parsons Morton (1824–1920), (Note: Lendal Pitts Morton (1796–1843) was the father of Zilpha Maria Mitchell (née Morton; 1834–1888); Lendal's brother, Daniel Oliver Morton (1788–1852) was the father of Levi Parsons Morton) 22nd Vice President of the United States (1889–1893) and 31st Governor of New York (1895–1897).

== Selected works ==
- The arts of life

Author: Bowker, R. R. 1848–1933.; Rogers, Bruce, Publication: Boston : Houghton, Mifflin and Co.; Cambridge : Riverside Press, 1900

- Of work and wealth; a summary of economics

Author: Bowker, R. R. 1848–1933. Publication: New York, Society for Political Education, 1883

- The American catalogue

Author: Pylodet, L. (anagram for Leypoldt); Bowker, R. R. Publication: New York : P. Smith, 1941, 1881

- The College of the City of New York : 1847–1895 /

Author: Bowker, R. R. 1848–1933. Publication: New York? : s.n., 1895

- Copyright: its history and its law

Author: Bowker, R. R. 1848–1933. Publication: Buffalo, N.Y. : W.S. Hein, 2002, 1912
