= Godfrey Dewey =

American sports executive (1887–1977)

- Born: September 3, 1887; New York City, New York, United States
- Died: October 18, 1977 (aged 90); Lake Placid, New York, United States
- Education: Harvard University
- Known for: the Olympics, English spelling reform
- Parent(s): Melvil Dewey, Annie Godfrey

Godfrey Dewey (September 3, 1887 – October 18, 1977) was the president of the Lake Placid Organizing Committee and a winter sports facility designer. He was largely responsible for the successful candidature of Lake Placid for the 1932 Winter Olympics. In addition to his role as the U.S. ski team manager he was chosen as the flag bearer for the 1928 Games in St. Moritz, Switzerland. Dewey was elected to the U.S. National Ski Hall of Fame in 1970.

Godfrey Dewey was the son of Melvil Dewey, the inventor of Dewey Decimal Classification, and his first wife Annie Godfrey. He was the father of Katharin Dewey, who, in 1940, piloted her bobsleigh to victory in the US Championships alongside male brakemen; women were subsequently banned from competing with men. Godfrey went on to become the honorary chairman of the Phonemic Spelling Council. His work on World English Spelling may have influenced the development of SoundSpel, as he and Edward Rondthaler corresponded from 1971.

Olympic Games
Preceded by Pat McDonald	Flagbearer for United States; St. Moritz 1928	Succeeded by Bud Houser
