= Horace Bowker =

American businessman (1877–1954)

Horace Bowker (May 13, 1877, in Boston – 1954) was a farm economist and businessman, born in Massachusetts and attended Harvard University. He led the American Agricultural Chemical Company from 1918 - 1937 during the Great Depression and was one of the business leaders of 1920s. In 1931, Bowker advocated a 19-year farm relief government-sponsored program to help alleviate over-cultivation and agriculture. Despite the bleak economic conditions, Bowker's tenure saw a doubling in profitability through diversification into chemical products besides fertilizers.
