= Media Source Inc. =

American magazine publishing company

- Founded: 1980
- Country of origin: United States
- Headquarters location: Plain City, Ohio
- Publication types: Magazines
- Owner: The Vistria Group
- Official website: www.mediasourceinc.com

Media Source Inc. (MSI) is an American magazine publishing company based in Plain City, Ohio. It began in 1980 as Pages and changed its name in March 1999.

MSI owns Horn Book, including The Horn Book Magazine, Junior Library Guild, and Library Hotline. It acquired both Library Journal and School Library Journal in 2010), as well as Digital Shift. All of these holdings are under its subsidiary MSI Information Services, the primary trade name under which the company does business. MSI was purchased by the private equity firm RLJ Equity Partners in 2011.
