= Alan Bowker =

Canadian educator and former diplomat

Alan Bowker is a Canadian educator and former diplomat. He has published two books of essays by Stephen Leacock entitled Stephen Leacock: Social Criticism and On the Front Line of Life: Stephen Leacock, Memories and Reflections. His book A Time Such as There Never Was Before: Canada After the Great War was published by Dundurn Press in September 2014. His latest book is A Church At War: MacKay Presbyterian Church, New Edinburgh, and the First World War, published by the University of Ottawa Press and the Canadian Museum of History in the Mercury Series. https://press.uottawa.ca/en/9780776642154/a-church-at-war/.

Alan Bowker was born in Medicine Hat, Alberta. He received his primary and secondary education in Winnipeg, Toronto, Chatham (New Jersey), and Oakville (Ontario). In 1965 he graduated with an honours BA in Modern History (English Option) from the University of Toronto, followed by an MA in 1966 in history, and a PhD in 1975 in Canadian history from the same university, under the supervision of Professor Carl Berger.

After teaching high school for a year, and part-time university teaching while completing his PhD, Bowker joined the then Department of External Affairs in 1973. He was posted to Tanzania during the presidency of Julius Nyerere (1975-7), and Zimbabwe during the early years of independence under Robert Mugabe (1982-5), and represented Canada in Mozambique, Seychelles, and Mauritius. He served as Canadian High Commissioner to Guyana and Ambassador to Suriname (1996-1999).

At headquarters he managed Canada-US economic, environmental, transport, and boundary issues (1978–82), and co-ordinated Canadian participation in the Conference on Security and Co-operation in Europe (today the OSCE) during the last years of the Cold War (1985–90). He managed the sensitive functions of Cabinet and Parliamentary Liaison (1990–93), and Access to Information and Privacy Protection (1993-1996).

As Director of International Academic Relations (1999-2005) he was responsible for international education policy, scholarship programs, Canadian studies abroad, education marketing, and international youth programs. From 2005 until his retirement in 2008, Bowker was seconded to Royal Military College of Canada, where he taught Canadian history, military history, civics, foreign and defence policy, social history, and the history of the Cold War.

Diplomatic posts
Preceded by Simon Wade	High Commissioner to Guyana; 1996-1999	Succeeded by Jacques Crête
Preceded by Simon Wade	Ambassador Extraordinary and Plenipotentiary to Suriname; 1996-	Succeeded by Jacques Crête
