= R. R. Bowker =

American company providing bibliographic information on published works

- Parent company: Cambridge Information Group
- Founded: 1868; 158 years ago
- Founder: Frederick Leypoldt; Company named after Richard Rogers Bowker, who acquired Leypoldt's business in 1878.
- Headquarters location: Chatham, New Jersey
- Key people: Beat Barblan, General Manager
- Publication types: Books
- Official website: www.bowker.com

R. R. Bowker LLC (trading as Bowker) is an American limited liability company domiciled under Delaware Limited Liability Company Law and based in Chatham, New Jersey. Among other things, Bowker provides bibliographic information on published works to the book trade, including publishers, booksellers, libraries, and individuals; its roots in the industry trace back to 1868. Bowker is the exclusive U.S. agent for issuing International Standard Book Numbers (ISBNs). Bowker is the publisher of Books in Print and other compilations of information about books and periodical titles. It provides supply chain services and analytical tools to the book publishing industry. Bowker is headquartered in Chatham, New Jersey, with additional operational offices in England and Australia. It is now owned by Cambridge Information Group.

== History ==
The company was founded in New York City by Frederick Leypoldt, a German immigrant who worked as a bookseller and recognized the need for good bibliographic information to make the book business more efficient. He established the monthly Literary Bulletin, his first periodical, in 1868. In 1870 Leypoldt issued the first edition of his Annual American Catalogue, the forerunner for Books in Print. In 1872 he published the first issue of Publishers Weekly, in 1873 the first Publishers' Uniform Trade-List Annual (later the Publishers Trade List Annual), and in 1876 the first issue of Library Journal. In 1878 Leypoldt's company was acquired by Richard Rogers Bowker. Leypoldt and Bowker also founded two influential standard book-industry references: Literary Marketplace and Ulrich's Periodicals Directory.

In 1967, the Xerox Corporation acquired the R. R. Bowker company, and then, in 1985, sold it to Reed International (now RELX Group). That same year, in 1985, Publishers Weekly—after 113 years as a part of R. R. Bowker—was transferred to the Cahners Publishing Company. In 1991, Reed's reference division moved to Chatham, New Jersey. In 2001, Cambridge Information Group acquired Bowker. In 2007, Cambridge Information Group sold Literary Marketplace and other directories to Information Today Inc. Cambridge Information Group merged Cambridge Scientific Abstracts with ProQuest Information and Learning to form ProQuest LLC, a privately held Delaware-domiciled limited liability company based in Ann Arbor, Michigan. R. R. Bowker LLC was repositioned as an affiliate of ProQuest.

== Selected publications ==
- Books in Print lists nearly all books that are currently available in English and in the United States from major publishers. A resource for bookstores, libraries, and publishers, it is available in a print version, but is most often accessed electronically. Books in Print lists several million books, a number that is only exceeded by Amazon. It was first published in 1948.
- The Library and Book Trade Almanac (formerly The Bowker Annual) is a resource for librarians, publishers, and booksellers which provides reviews of "key trends, events, and developments" in the industry; statistics on book prices, numbers of books published, library expenditures, and average salaries; explanations of new legislation and changes in funding programs; and other information.

== Services ==
Bowker is the United States provider of International Standard Book Numbers (ISBNs), a code for identifying commercial books devised by Gordon Foster in 1967. An ISBN is currently placed on a book to uniquely identify it. ISBNs are available one at a time and in blocks up to 100,000 for a set fee. ISBNs may be purchased and maintained at Bowker's My Identifiers website. Many countries, including the UK, Italy, Germany, Spain, to name a few, charge for ISBNs. Canada and Mexico provide ISBNs free of charge, as their ISBN agencies are government funded.

== See also ==
- List of academic databases and search engines
- American Architects Directory
- Robert Freeman Asleson (1935–2010), former president of R. R. Bowker
- Bowker's Law Books and Serials in Print
- Jaques Cattell
- Eric Moon (born 1923), former editor-in-chief of the Library Journal, a publication of R. R. Bowker
- Variety Film Reviews
- Who's Who in American Art
