= Samuel Swett Green =

American librarian (1837–1918)

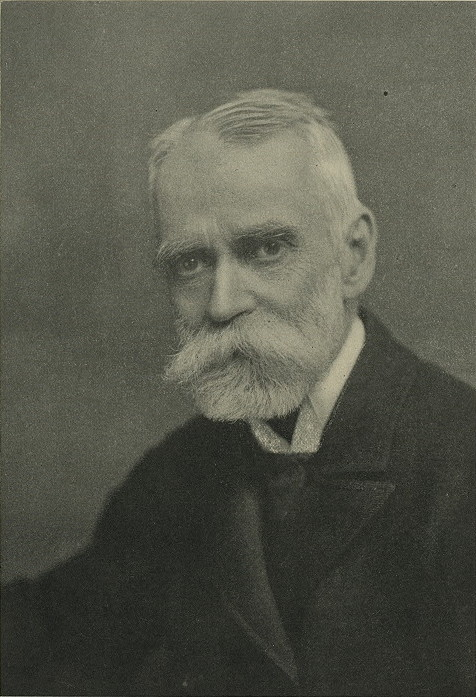
- Green, c. 1890

President of the American Library Association
- In office July 1891 – November 1891
- Preceded by: Melvil Dewey
- Succeeded by: Klas August Linderfelt

Personal details
- Born: February 20, 1837 Worcester, Massachusetts, US
- Died: December 8, 1918 (aged 81) Worcester, Massachusetts, US
- Education: Harvard University
- Alma mater: Harvard University; Harvard Divinity School
- Occupation: Librarian

Samuel Swett Green (February 20, 1837 – December 8, 1918) was an American librarian. President of the American Library Association in 1891, he was a figure of public library advocacy in the United States.

== Biography ==
Green was born on February 20, 1837, in Worcester, Massachusetts, the son of pharmacist James Green and Elizabeth Swett. Studious as a child, he first attended a private school, followed by the public Worcester High School, graduating in 1854. He studied at Harvard University, graduating with a Bachelor of Arts in 1858. Chronically ill, he then remained inactive until fall 1860, when he began attending Harvard Divinity School. He temporarily dropped out due to illness, though graduated in 1864. In 1870, he earned an honorary Master of Arts and honorary membership of Phi Beta Kappa.

Green attempted to enlist in the American Civil War, but was rejected due to being 5 ft 2 in (1.57 m) tall. He worked for the Mechanics National Bank, as a bookkeeper then a teller. He left the bank due to rheumatic fever.

On January 1, 1867, Green became director of the Worcester Public Library, and in January 1871, became its librarian. As director, he catered to commoners, maintained an in-house art collection, and instated the library's first telephones c. 1880. He resigned as director in 1909. In April 1880, he was elected to the American Antiquarian Society.

In 1876, Green was a founding member of the American Library Association. He was a figure of public library advocacy in the United States, having been given the nickname, the "father of public libraries". He served as the organization's vice-president from 1887 to 1889 and again from 1892 to 1893, and as its president from July to November 1891. He was also a lecturer at Columbia University and the New York State Library.

In 1900, Green wrote the memoir for his friend, minister and writer Edward Griffin Porter.

Green was a trustee of Worcester Academy. He died on December 8, 1918, aged 81, in Worcester. An archive of his papers is held by the Worcester Public Library.

Non-profit organization positions
Preceded by Melvil Dewey	President of the American Library Association; 1891	Succeeded by Klas August Linderfelt
