= Neville Bowker =

Southern Rhodesian World War II flying ace

Neville Bowker DFC (1918–2005) was the third-highest-scoring fighter ace from Southern Rhodesia during World War II.
