= Frederick Leypoldt =

German-American bibliographer (1835–1884)

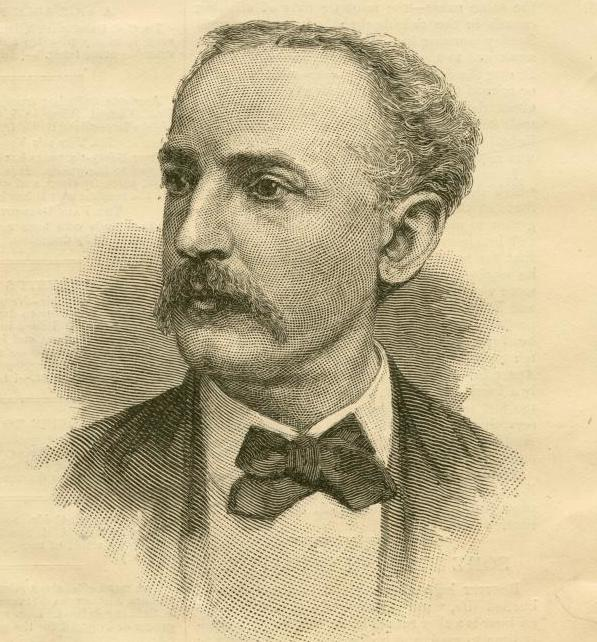
- Born: 17 November 1835; Stuttgart
- Died: 31 March 1884
- Occupation: Bibliographer

Frederick Leypoldt (born Jakob Friedrich Ferdinand Leupold; 17 November 1835 – 31 March 1884) was a German-American bibliographer, the founder of Library Journal, Publishers Weekly, Index Medicus and other publications.

== Early life and education ==
Frederick Leypoldt was born in 1835 in Stuttgart, Kingdom of Württemberg, his name at birth being Jakob Friedrich Ferdinand Leupold. Leypoldt had an early liking for the drama and books, and he wrote a play as a youth, which he offered unsuccessfully to German managers. He left school in 1851.

== Career ==
In 1854, he emigrated to the United States, where he simplified his name to Frederick Leypoldt. He entered the service of a bookseller in New York City, which, in 1859, helped him establish himself in business in Philadelphia. In Philadelphia, Leypoldt opened a bookstore and reading room, and in 1863 he began to publish first translations of foreign books, and later foreign textbooks with English notes. In January 1866, with Henry Holt, he established the publishing firm Leypoldt and Holt and moved to New York City. Under the anagram of "F. Pylodet", Leypoldt edited a successful series of French textbooks, wrote some German verse and translated some works into German.

Leypoldt and Holt continued, but in 1868 Leypoldt decided to devote himself personally to bibliographical work. The monthly Literary Bulletin, his first periodical, which he established in 1868, became the Trade Circular in 1870. In January 1872, the Trade Circular absorbed George W. Childs's Publishers' Circular and was published weekly.

In 1873, it became Publishers Weekly. Leypoldt published an American Catalogue for 1869, and in 1876 he began work on the American catalogue proper, which was completed in 1880. His Publishers' Uniform Trade-List Annual was begun in 1873, the Literary News in 1875, the Library Journal in 1876, and the Index Medicus, a monthly medical bibliography, in 1880. Most of these publications were continued by his friend Richard Rogers Bowker after Leypoldt's untimely death (Bowker having purchased Publishers Weekly from him in 1878). Leypoldt was among the founders of the American Book Trade Union in 1875,

Leypoldt was instrumental in establishing the American Library Association in 1876. He published the proceedings of the 1876 organizing conference in the first volume of Library Journal.

Frederick Leypoldt died in New York City on 31 March 1884. Writing of his death, Samuel Swett Green noted, "His friends believed that the zeal that was conspicuous in him led to strenuous labors in furthering his projects of the Publishers' Weekly, the Library Journal and the American Catalogue ...which shortened his life many years perhaps.". Leypoldt's widow, Augusta Garrigue Leypoldt, continued to work at Publishers' Weekly for thirty years.

== Selected publications ==
- Leypoldt, Frederick. (1868). Beginner's French Reader: Short and Easy Pieces in Prose and Verse with a Complete Vocabulary Nouvelle éd. corrigée ed. New York Boston: Henry Holt and Co. F.W. Christern; Carl Schœnhof.
- Leypoldt, Frederick. (1868). New Guide to German Conversation: Containing ... a Synopsis of German Grammar Arranged from the Works of Witcomb Dr. Emil Otto Flaxmann and Others. New York Boston: Henry Holt: F.W. Christern; Carl Schoenhof.
- Leypoldt, Frederick. (1869). New Guide to German Conversation Containing an Alphabetical List of Nearly Eight Hundred Familiar Words Similar in Orthography or Sound and of the Same Meaning in Both Languages Followed by Exercises; a Classified Vocabulary of Words in Frequent Use; Familiar Phrases and Dialogues; a Sketch of German Literature; Idiomatic Expressions; Proverbs Letters Etc.; and a Synopsis of German Grammar. New York: Leypoldt & Holt F.W. Christern.
- Leypoldt, Frederick & Henry Holt. (1869). To the Trade.: A Want to Be Met. Every Intelligent Bookseller Has Felt the Need of Some List of New Books to Distribute to His Customers and to Book-Buyers Whom He Wishes to Make Customers. ... We Propose to Issue a Monthly Bulletin of Current Literature to Contain the Following Features. New York: Published by Leypoldt & Holt.
- Leypoldt, Frederick. (1874). The Publishers' Trade List Annual: Embracing the Full Trade-Lists of American Publishers Together with Alphabetical Reference List of Books Recorded in the Publishers' Weekly from January 16, 1873 to June 27, 1874 and the American Educational Catalogue for 1874. New York: Office of the Publishers' Weekly 37 Park Row.
- Leypoldt, Frederick. (1875). The Publishers' Trade List Annual: Embracing the Full Trade-Lists of American Publishers with Alphabelical Indexes to the Principal Books of Each Publisher Represented; Also the American Educational Catalogue for 1875. New York: R.R. Bowker Co. Office of the Publishers' weekly.
- Leypoldt, Frederick and Lynds E Jones. (1880). The American Catalogue. Author and Title Entries of Books in Print and for Sale (Including Reprints and Importations) July 1, 1876. [Appendix. Contributed Lists of Books Published Since 1876 with Author and Title Index]. New York: A.C. Armstrong & Son.
- Leypoldt, Frederick. (1881). A Reading Diary of Modern Fiction Containing a Representative List of the Novels of the Nineteenth Century Preceded by Suggestive Remarks on Novels and Novel Reading. New York: F. Leypoldt.
- Leypoldt, Frederick and Lynds E Jones. (1881). The Books of All Time: A Guide for the Purchase of Books. Boston: Rockwell and Churchill.
- Leypoldt, Frederick R. R Bowker and Augusta Isabella Appleton. (1885). The American Catalogue : Founded by F. Leypoldt 1876-1884 : Books Recorded (Including Reprints and Importations) July 1, 1876-June 30, 1884. New York: Office of the Publishers' Weekly.
- Leypoldt, Frederick and R. R Bowker. (1896). The American Catalogue 1890-1895 : Books Recorded (Including Reprints and Importations) July 1, 1890 – June 30, 1895. New York: Office of the Publishers' Weekly.

== Other sources ==
- Wilson, J. G.; Fiske, J., eds. (1892). "Leypoldt, Frederick" . Appletons' Cyclopædia of American Biography. New York: D. Appleton.
