= Melvil Dewey =

Inventor of the Dewey Decimal system (1851–1931)

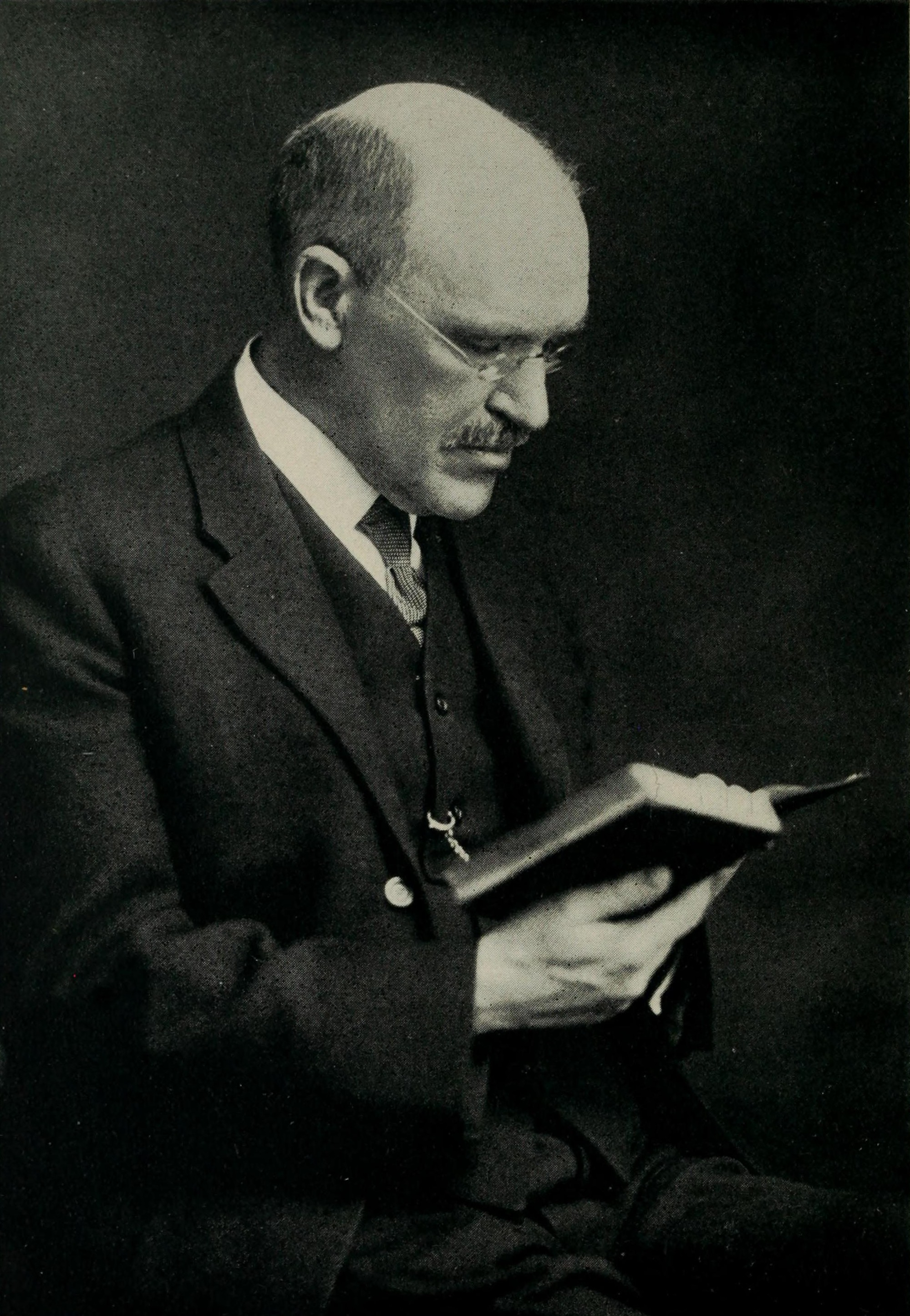
- Dewey c. 1921

President of the American Library Association
- In office May 1892 – 1893
- Preceded by: William Isaac Fletcher
- Succeeded by: Josephus Nelson Larned
- In office 1890 – July 1891
- Preceded by: Frederick Morgan Crunden
- Succeeded by: Samuel Swett Green

Personal details
- Born: Melville Louis Kossuth Dewey; December 10, 1851 Adams Center, New York, U.S.
- Died: December 26, 1931 (aged 80) Lake Placid, Florida, U.S.
- Spouses: Annie R. Godfrey (m. 1878); Emily McKay Beal (m. 1924)
- Children: Godfrey Dewey
- Education: Amherst College (AB, MA)
- Occupation: Librarian; resort developer; reformer
- Known for: Dewey Decimal Classification

Melville Louis Kossuth "Melvil" Dewey (December 10, 1851 – December 26, 1931) was an American librarian and educator who invented the Dewey Decimal system of library classification. He was a founder of the Lake Placid Club, a chief librarian at Columbia College, founder of what would later become the Columbia University School of Library Service, and a founding member of the American Library Association. Although Dewey's contributions to the modern library are widely recognized, his legacy is marred by his sexual harassment of female colleagues, as well as his racism and antisemitism.

== Education and personal life ==
Dewey was born on December 10, 1851, in Adams Center, New York, the fifth and last child of Joel and Eliza Greene Dewey. He attended rural schools and determined early on that his destiny was to reform the education of the masses. He briefly attended Alfred University (1870), then Amherst College, where he belonged to Delta Kappa Epsilon, and from which he earned a bachelor's degree in 1874 and a master's degree in 1877.

While still a student, he founded the Library Bureau, which sold high-quality index-cards and filing-cabinets, and established the standard dimensions for catalog cards.

As a young adult, he advocated spelling reform; he changed his name from the usual "Melville" to "Melvil", without redundant letters, and for a time changed his surname to "Dui."

From 1883 to 1888 he was chief librarian at the Columbia College Libraries. During his time as director of the New York State Library (1888–1906), Dewey established a program of traveling libraries. From 1888 to 1900, he served as secretary and executive officer of the University of the State of New York.

In 1895, Dewey and his wife Annie founded the Lake Placid Club. He and his son Godfrey had been active in arranging the Winter Olympics, which took place at Lake Placid—he chaired the New York State Winter Olympics Committee. In 1926, he went to Florida to establish a new branch of the Lake Placid Club.

Dewey married twice, first to Annie R. Godfrey and then to Emily McKay Beal. He and his first wife had one child, Godfrey. Dewey became a member of the American Library Association's Hall of Fame in 1951.

He died of a stroke in Lake Placid, Florida.

== Work ==
Dewey pioneered American librarianship and was an influential figure in the development of libraries in America in the late 19th and early 20th centuries. He is best known for the decimal classification system that many public and school libraries use. Among his other innovations was the idea of a state library operating as the state's school and public library services controller. In Boston, Massachusetts, he founded the Library Bureau, a private company "for the definite purpose of furnishing libraries with equipment and supplies of unvarying correctness and reliability." Its investigative unit, devoted to studying the best practices of library loss-management, circulation and data retention, recovered 3,000 books in its first year of existence.

Dewey's Library Bureau company is also said to have introduced hanging vertical files, first seen at the Columbian Exposition of 1893 in Chicago. In 1905, Dewey established the American Library Institute, which was an organization conceived to provide for the investigation, study, and discussion of issues within the field of library theory and practice.

=== Dewey Decimal Classification ===
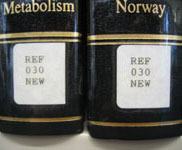
Spine labels of The New Encyclopaedia Britannica, showing Dewey Decimal Classification call numbers (030=Encyclopedias)

Immediately after receiving his undergraduate degree, Dewey was hired to manage Amherst's library and reclassify its collections. He worked out a new scheme that superimposed a system of decimal numbers on a structure of knowledge first outlined by Sir Francis Bacon. For his decision to use a decimal system, he may have been inspired by two library systems that he includes in the acknowledgments in the first publication of his system in 1876. In that preface, and the following thirteen editions, Dewey cites the card system of Italian publisher Natale Battezzati as "the most fruitful source of ideas".

Dewey copyrighted the system in 1876. This system has proved to be enormously influential; though many American libraries have since adopted the classification scheme of the Library of Congress, Dewey's system remains in widespread use.

=== American Library Association ===
In 1876, Dewey moved to Boston, where he founded and became editor of The Library Journal, which became an influential factor in the development of libraries in America and the reform of their administration. He was also one of the founders of the American Library Association. The proceedings of the 1876 organizing conference were published by Frederick Leypoldt in the first volume of Library Journal. Dewey was secretary from 1876 to 1891 and president in 1891 and 1893.

=== Commercial activities ===
in 1876 he established a company called the Library Bureau to sell libraries equipment such as catalog cards, drawers and cabinets. The company also encouraged other enterprises such as businesses to adopt his system for internal record-keeping. By 1893 the firm had expanded into all sorts of office equipment to support the emerging technologies of typewriters and stenography machines.

=== School of Library Economy ===
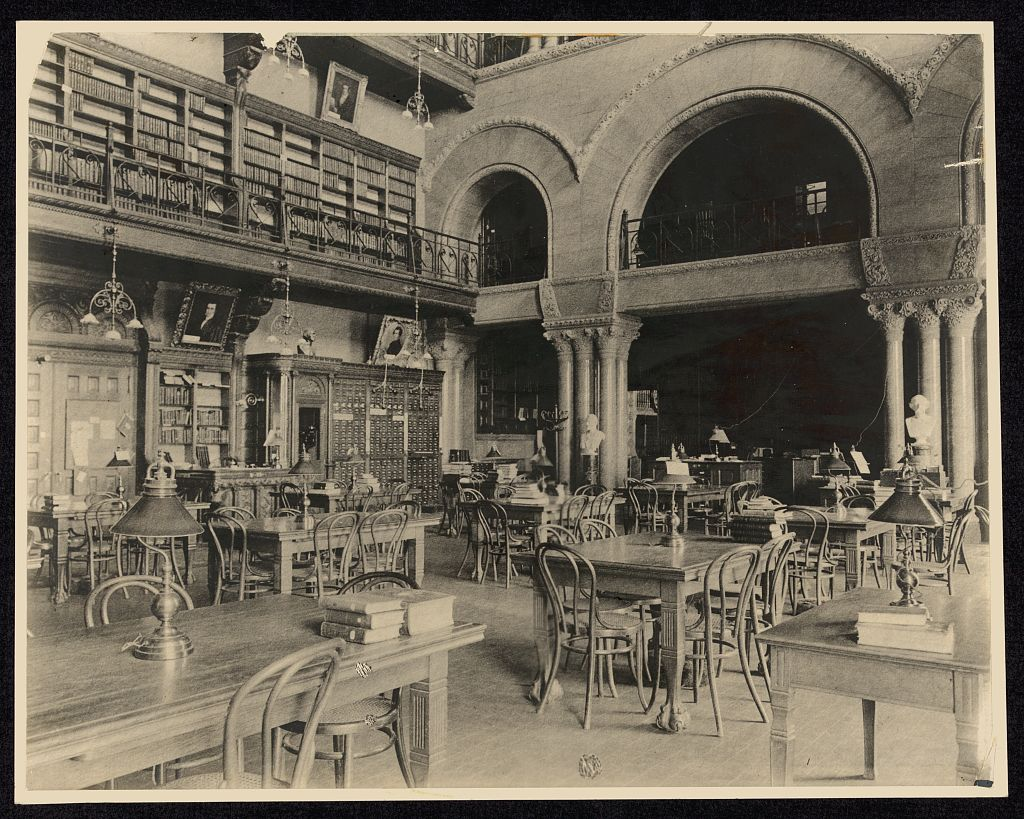
The interior of the New York State Library, late 19th century

In 1883, Dewey replaced Beverly R. Betts as librarian of Columbia College and, in the following year, founded the School of Library Economy there, the first institution for the instruction of librarians ever organized. The college's board of trustees approved the proposal to establish the school on May 5, 1884. After preparation, the school was officially opened on January 5, 1887, with an enrollment of 20 students—three men and 17 women. Women were admitted to the program at Dewey's insistence and against the wishes of the college's Regents. Although the school had a promising start, Dewey's conflicts with college officials, in particular over the issue of the presence of women, led to its future being cast in doubt, and by 1888, it was apparent that Columbia intended to close it.

However, at that point, Dewey, upon accepting a position with the New York State Library in Albany, successfully secured the agreement of its Regents to have the school transferred there. The formal transfer was accomplished in 1889, and the school, which was ultimately very successful, was re-established in Albany as the New York State Library School under Dewey's direction. The school returned to Columbia's Manhattan campus in 1926. Dewey did not forget his Columbia students. He petitioned the University of the State of New York, which granted degrees to those students who agreed to submit to examinations and produce a bibliography and thesis. Two students participated, including future ALA registrar and college archivist Nina Browne.

From 1888 to 1906, Dewey was also director of the New York State Library, and until 1900, he was secretary of the University of the State of New York as well. In that function, he completely reorganized the state library, making it one of the most efficient in America, and established the system of state traveling libraries and picture collections. In 1885, he founded the New York Library Club there.

=== Traveling libraries ===
Community libraries began to flourish in the early nineteenth century. The western United States opened to expansion and further exploration, and people wanted services and opportunities to move with them. In New York, Melvil Dewey had "initiated a program of traveling libraries-collections of one hundred books sent to communities without public libraries." His efforts spurred other state organizations and private individuals to create traveling libraries. Increased library services to small or rural communities and underserved populations fortified the efforts of many to seek out education and self-improvement. Dewey was also influenced by Herbert Baxter Adams on ideas about library extension.

=== Metric system advocacy ===
As an enthusiastic supporter of the decimal metric system of weights and measures, Dewey established in July 1876 the American Metric Bureau. He edited the Bureau's official publication, the Metric Bulletin (later called Metric Advocate), first issued in August of that year. He campaigned for this reform vigorously, but by 1901 the Bureau was almost defunct. Later in his life, he was a member of the advisory board of the All-America Standards Council (a California-based organization that promoted metrication for all countries in the Americas), and he functioned as a member of the advisory board and chairman of the Metric Education Committee in the American Metric Association (today the U.S. Metric Association).

=== Lake Placid Club and other reforms ===
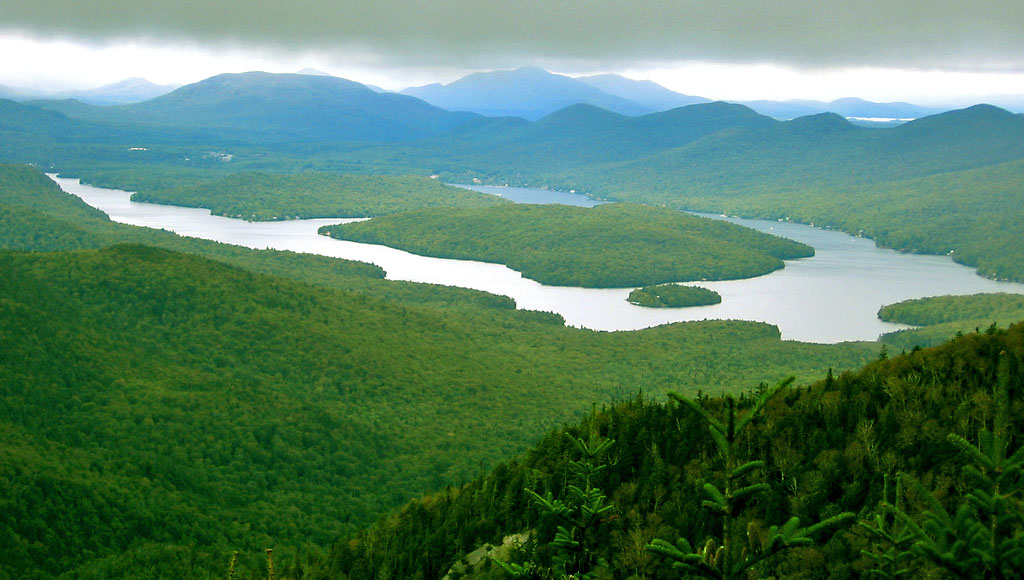
Lake Placid from the Whiteface Mountain gondola

Late in his life, Dewey helped found the Lake Placid Club as a health resort in New York state.

His theories of spelling reform (to which end he founded the Spelling Reform Association in 1886 and later the Simplified Spelling Board) found some local success at Lake Placid. There was an "Adirondak Loj" in the area, and the dinner menus of the club used his reformed spelling. A September 1927 menu is headed "Simpler spelin" and features dishes like hadok, poted beef with noodls, parsli or masht potato, butr, steamd rys, letis, and ys cream. It also advises guests that "All shud see the butiful after-glo on mountains to the east just before sunset. Fyn vu from Golfhous porch." He even went as far as referring to himself as “Melvil Dui”.

Lake Placid also acted as a conference center hosting meetings promoting reform movements, such as the September 1899 conference on "home science" chaired by Ellen Swallow Richards, a pioneer of what later came to be called "home economics".

Dewey was an early promoter of winter sports in Lake Placid and was active in arranging the 1932 Winter Olympics there. He was also a founder of the Lake Placid Club Education Foundation in 1922. Under his leadership, the Northwood School (Lake Placid, New York) prospered. He was also a founder of the Adirondack Music Festival in 1925, and served as a trustee of the Chautauqua Institution.

In 1926, he established a southern branch of the Lake Placid Club in Florida. Dewey supported the idea of Lake Stearns in Florida formally changing its name to Lake Placid, Florida.

== Controversies ==
Dewey established a pattern of making powerful enemies early in life. Many of his friends found him difficult as well. As one biographer put it, "Although he did not lack friends, they were becoming a little weary of coming to his defense, so endless a process had it become."

=== Sexual harassment ===
Another biography refers to Dewey's "old nemesis—a persistent inability to control himself around women" as a chronic cause of trouble on the job. For decades, Dewey refused to stop his "unwelcome hugging, unwelcome touching, certainly unwelcome kissing" with female subordinates and others, according to biographer Wayne A. Wiegand. When Dewey opened his School of Library Economy at Columbia College to women, he asked for a photograph from each female applicant since "you cannot polish a pumpkin".

In 1905, during a 10-day trip to Alaska sponsored by the American Library Association (ALA), a group he co-founded, he made unwelcome advances toward four prominent librarians (including Adelaide Hasse) who informed association officials. As a result, Dewey was forced to step down from active participation in the ALA as several of his colleagues added their voices to the campaign. After 1906, Dewey was no longer an active ALA member, but he was still invited to be the guest of honor at the ALA's 50th anniversary meeting in 1926. Reports, allegations, and an investigation of Dewey's inappropriate and offensive behavior directed at women continued for decades after his departure from the ALA. Prominent critics of his sexual misbehavior included Tessa Kelso. "In exchange for a quiet departure, he was spared an ugly and public expose of one of his major flaws," Wiegand wrote. "He was never again a power player in ALA politics."

In 1929, Dewey settled a lawsuit out-of-court, brought by a former stenographer—whom he had kissed and caressed in public the previous summer—for $2,147 ($40,256 in 2025).

In general, Dewey himself did not deny his actions—only their impropriety. "I have been very unconventional ... as men [are] always who frankly show and speak of their liking for women," he wrote. But, he insisted, it was not his fault if the targets of his "unconventional" actions took offense: "Pure women would understand my ways."

=== Antisemitism and racism ===
The Lake Placid Club banned Jews, blacks, and others from membership, a policy written by Dewey himself. Out of fear, Dewey bought the land adjacent to the Lake Placid Club to prevent Jews from purchasing it. In 1904, the New York State Board of Regents received a petition demanding Dewey's removal as state librarian because of his involvement in the Lake Placid Club's policy of excluding Jews and other religious and ethnic groups. While the regents declined to remove Dewey, they did issue a public rebuke, and in the summer of 1905 he resigned as a result.

=== American Library Association medal ===
At the June 2019 conference of the American Library Association, the Council voted to remove Dewey's name from its top honor, the Melvil Dewey Medal; the resolution cited Dewey's history of racism, antisemitism, and sexual harassment. The resolution was passed overwhelmingly with no debate. The award was renamed the ALA Medal of Excellence at the Association's January 2020 conference.

== Selected publications ==
- 1876: Classification and subject index for cataloguing and arranging the books and pamphlets of a library, Hartford, Conn.: Case, Lockwood, & Brainard Company.
- 1885: Decimal classification and relativ [sic] index for arranging, cataloguing, and indexing public and private libraries and for pamphlets, clippings, notes, scrap books, index rerums, etc. (2nd edition) Boston: Library Bureau.
- 1886: Librarianship as a profession for college-bred women. An address delivered before the Association of collegiate alumnæ, on March 13, 1886, by Melvil Dewey. Boston: Library Bureau.
- 1887: Library notes: improved methods and labor-savers for librarians, readers and writers. Boston: Library Bureau.
- 1895: Abridged decimal classification and relative index for libraries. Boston: Library Bureau.
- 1898: Simplified library school rules. Boston, London [etc.]: Library Bureau.
- 1889: Libraries as related to the educational work of the state. Albany.
- 1890: Statistics of libraries in the state of New York numbering over 300 volumes. Albany.
- 1890: Library school rules: 1. Card catalog rules; 2. Accession book rules; 3. Shelf list rules.
- 1904: A.L.A. catalog Washington: Government Printing Office.

== See also ==
- Public library advocacy

Non-profit organization positions
Preceded by William Isaac Fletcher	President of the American Library Association; 1892–1893	Succeeded by Josephus Nelson Larned
Preceded by Frederick Morgan Crunden	President of the American Library Association; 1890–1891	Succeeded by Samuel Swett Green
