= List of 1924 Winter Olympics medal winners =

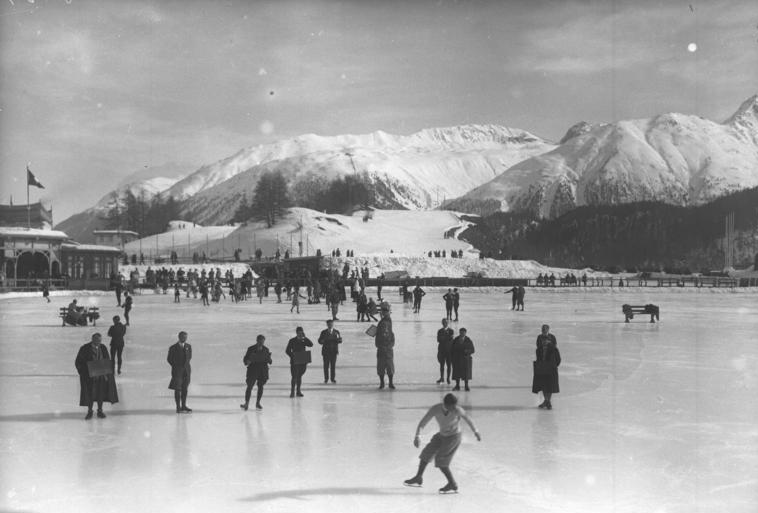
Swedish figure skater Gillis Grafström earned a gold medal in men's figure skating at the 1924 Winter Olympics, which was one of four Olympic Games where he medaled. This image shows his performance at the 1928 Winter Olympics in St. Moritz.

The inaugural Winter Olympics were held in Chamonix, France, from 25 January to 4 February 1924. A total of 258 athletes from 16 National Olympic Committees (NOCs) competed in 16 events across 9 disciplines. Women also participated in these Games, although the only events they were allowed to compete in were the figure skating ladies' singles and pairs. When the Games were held, they were not recognized as the Winter Olympics but as a winter sports week festival. It was not until 1926 that the International Olympic Committee (IOC) officially recognized them as the first Winter Olympics.

104 athletes won medals for their NOCs, but the athletes from Norway and Finland stood out and dominated the Games, winning 17 and 11 medals, respectively. The United States and Great Britain tied for third place in the total number of medals, with four each. Athletes from 10 of the 16 participating NOCs won at least one medal; eight won at least one gold medal. Many of the athletes who won these medals had already returned to their home countries by the time the medals were awarded, on 5 February, and other participants from their countries had to take the medals to the winning athletes.

Finnish speed skater Clas Thunberg topped the medal count with five medals: three golds, one silver, and one bronze. One of his competitors, Roald Larsen of Norway, also won five medals, with two silver and three bronze medal-winning performances. The first gold medalist at these Games—and therefore the first gold medalist in Winter Olympic history—was American speed skater Charles Jewtraw. Only one medal change occurred after the Games: in the ski jump competition, a marking error deprived American athlete Anders Haugen of a bronze medal. Haugen pursued an appeal to the IOC many years after the fact; he was awarded the medal after a 1974 decision in his favor.

== Bobsleigh ==
Event	Gold	Silver	Bronze
Men's four-man	Switzerland; Alfred Neveu; Eduard Scherrer; Alfred Schläppi; Heinrich Schläppi	Great Britain; Thomas Arnold; Ralph Broome; Alexander Richardson; Rodney Soher	Belgium; Charles Mulder; René Mortiaux; Paul Van den Broeck; Victor Verschueren; Henri Willems (Note: The IOC medal database recognizes five members of the Belgian team in the four-man event. The fifth man was an alternate.)

== Cross-country skiing ==
Event	Gold	Silver	Bronze
18 km	Thorleif Haug; Norway	Johan Grøttumsbråten; Norway	Tapani Niku; Finland
50 km	Thorleif Haug; Norway	Thoralf Strømstad; Norway	Johan Grøttumsbråten; Norway

== Curling ==
Event	Gold	Silver	Bronze
Men's team	Great Britain; T. S. Robertson-Aikman; William Jackson; Robin Welsh; Thomas Murray; Alternates: Laurence Jackson; John McLeod; William Brown; Delaval Astley (Note: D.G. Astley earned a gold medal in curling with the team from Great Britain, but played for Sweden II in their play-off against France for the second silver medal in that competition. The current IOC medal database only lists him as winning a gold medal, though some sources suggest he may have received both a gold and silver medal. If that is true, he would be the only Olympic athlete in history to have received a gold and silver medal in the same event.); R. Cousin	Sweden II (Note: Both the official report of the 1924 Winter Olympics and the IOC medal database list two Swedish teams as having won the silver medal in curling. However, neither source explains why two silver medals were awarded in the event.); Johan Petter Åhlén; Carl Axel Pettersson; Karl Wahlberg	France; Henri Cournollet; Pierre Canivet; Armand Bénédic; Georges André; Alternates: Henri Aldebert; Robert Planque
Men's team	Great Britain; T. S. Robertson-Aikman; William Jackson; Robin Welsh; Thomas Murray; Alternates: Laurence Jackson; John McLeod; William Brown; Delaval Astley; R. Cousin	Sweden I Carl Wilhelm Petersén; Ture Ödlund; Victor Wetterström; Erik Severin; Alternates: Carl August Kronlund; Carl Wilhelm Petersén	France; Henri Cournollet; Pierre Canivet; Armand Bénédic; Georges André; Alternates: Henri Aldebert; Robert Planque

== Figure skating ==
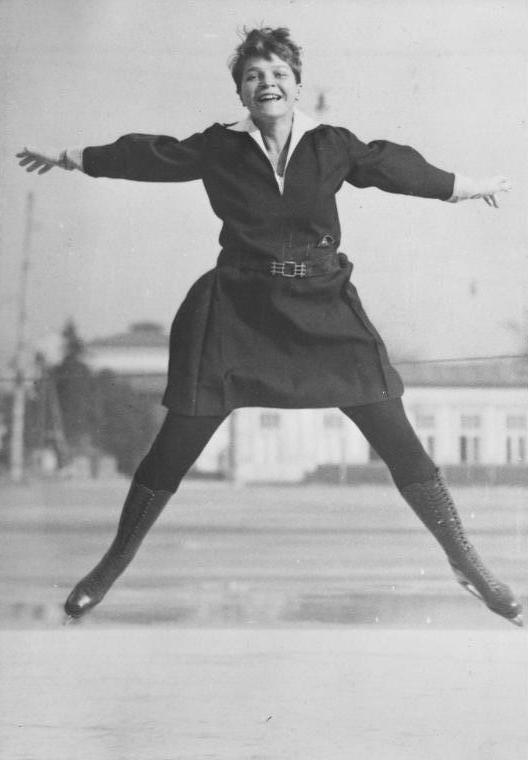
Herma Szabo of Austria highlighted an already successful figure skating career (seven World titles) with the first Olympic ladies' singles gold medal.

Event	Gold	Silver	Bronze
Men's singles	Gillis Grafström; Sweden	Willy Böckl; Austria	Georges Gautschi; Switzerland
Ladies' singles	Herma Szabo; Austria	Beatrix Loughran; United States	Ethel Muckelt; Great Britain
Pairs	Austria; Helene Engelmann; Alfred Berger	Finland; Ludowika Jakobsson; Walter Jakobsson	France; Andrée Joly; Pierre Brunet

== Ice hockey ==
Event	Gold	Silver	Bronze
Men's team	Canada; Jack Cameron; Ernie Collett; Bert McCaffrey; Harold McMunn; Dunc Munro; Beattie Ramsay; Cyril Slater; Hooley Smith; Harry Watson	United States; Clarence Abel; Herbert Drury; Alphonse Lacroix; John Langley; John Lyons; Justin McCarthy; Willard Rice; Irving Small; Frank Synott	Great Britain; William Anderson; Lorne Carr-Harris; Colin Carruthers; Eric Carruthers; Guy Clarkson; Ross Cuthbert; Geoffrey Holmes; Hamilton Jukes; Edward Pitblado; Blane Sexton

== Military patrol ==
Event	Gold	Silver	Bronze
Military patrol	Switzerland; Adolf Aufdenblatten; Alphonse Julen; Antoine Julen; Denis Vaucher	Finland; August Eskelinen; Heikki Hirvonen; Martti Lappalainen; Väinö Bremer	France; Adrien "André" Vandelle; Camille Mandrillon; Georges Berthet; Maurice Mandrillon

== Nordic combined ==
Event	Gold	Silver	Bronze
Men's individual	Thorleif Haug; Norway	Thoralf Strømstad; Norway	Johan Grøttumsbråten; Norway

== Ski jumping ==
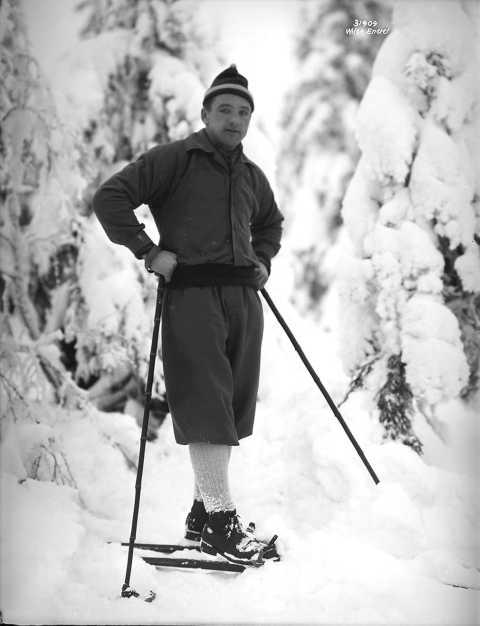
Jacob Tullin Thams of Norway was the first Olympic ski jumping champion and one of the few Olympians to medal in both Winter and Summer Olympics, as he also collected a silver in sailing at the 1936 Berlin Games.

Event	Gold	Silver	Bronze
Men's individual	Jacob Tullin Thams; Norway	Narve Bonna; Norway	Anders Haugen; United States

== Speed skating ==
Event	Gold	Silver	Bronze
500 metres	Charles Jewtraw; United States	Oskar Olsen; Norway	Roald Larsen; Norway
500 metres	Charles Jewtraw; United States	Oskar Olsen; Norway	Clas Thunberg; Finland
1500 metres	Clas Thunberg; Finland	Roald Larsen; Norway	Sigurd Moen; Norway
5000 metres	Clas Thunberg; Finland	Julius Skutnabb; Finland	Roald Larsen; Norway
10000 metres	Julius Skutnabb; Finland	Clas Thunberg; Finland	Roald Larsen; Norway
All-round	Clas Thunberg; Finland	Roald Larsen; Norway	Julius Skutnabb; Finland

== Medal leaders ==
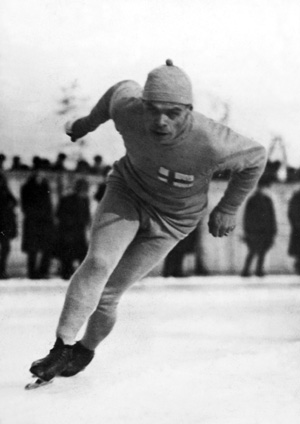
Clas Thunberg of Finland won a medal in each of the five speed skating events, including three golds, making him the most successful athlete in Chamonix.

Athletes who won multiple medals are listed below.

Athlete	Nation	Sport	Gold	Silver	Bronze	Total
Clas Thunberg	Finland	Speed skating	3	1	1	5
Thorleif Haug	Norway	Cross-country skiing and Nordic combined	3	0	0	3
Julius Skutnabb	Finland	Speed skating	1	1	1	3
Roald Larsen	Norway	Speed skating	0	2	3	5
Thoralf Strømstad	Norway	Cross-country skiing and Nordic combined	0	2	0	2
Johan Grøttumsbråten	Norway	Cross-country skiing and Nordic combined	0	1	2	3

== See also ==
- 1924 Winter Olympics medal table
