= List of Olympic medalists in bobsleigh =

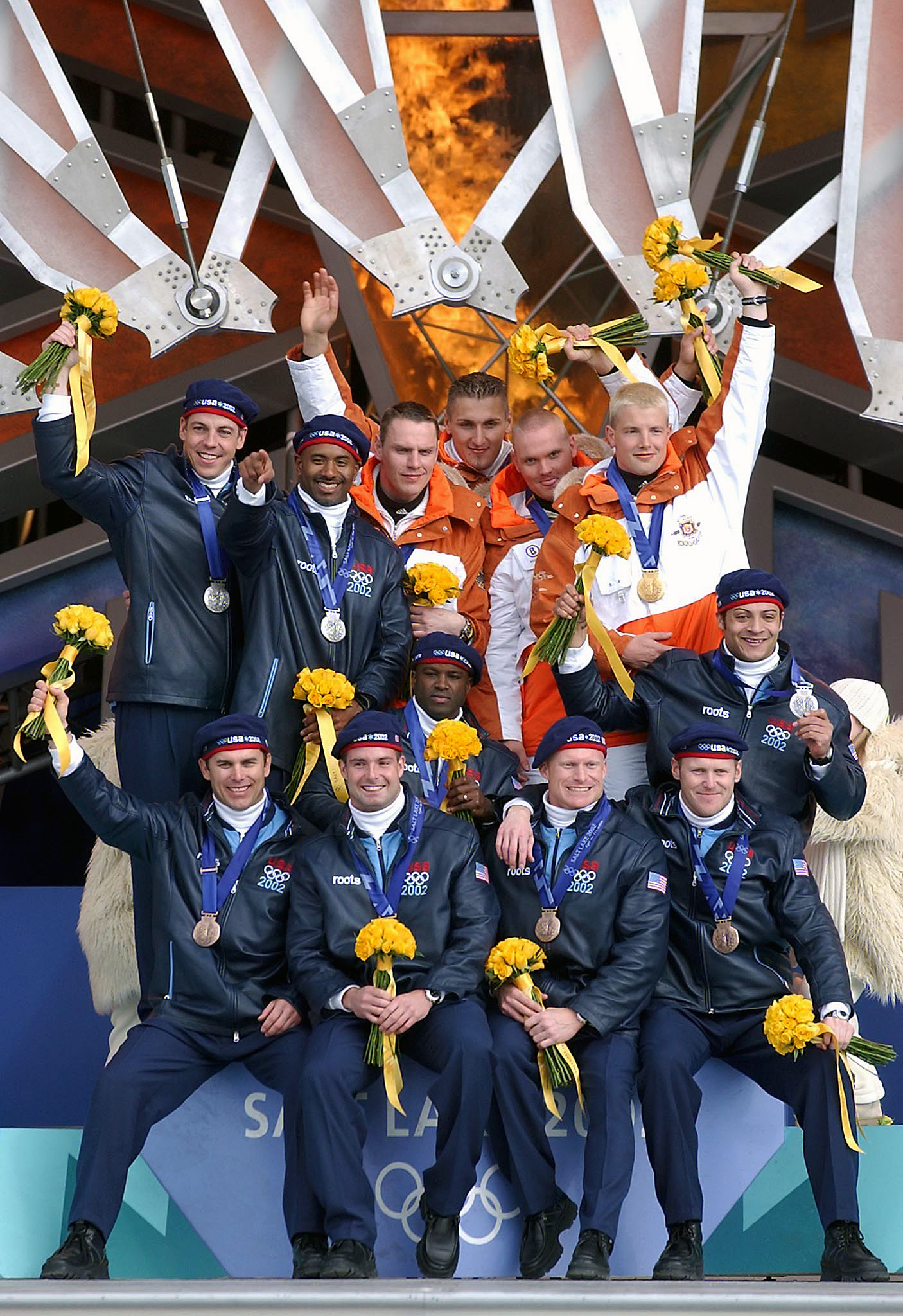
Bobsled team members from Germany-2 (orange and white), USA-1, (center row in blue) and USA-2 wave to the crowd after receiving their newly awarded medals during a ceremony in Salt Lake City for the men's four-man bobsled event in the 2002 Winter Olympics.

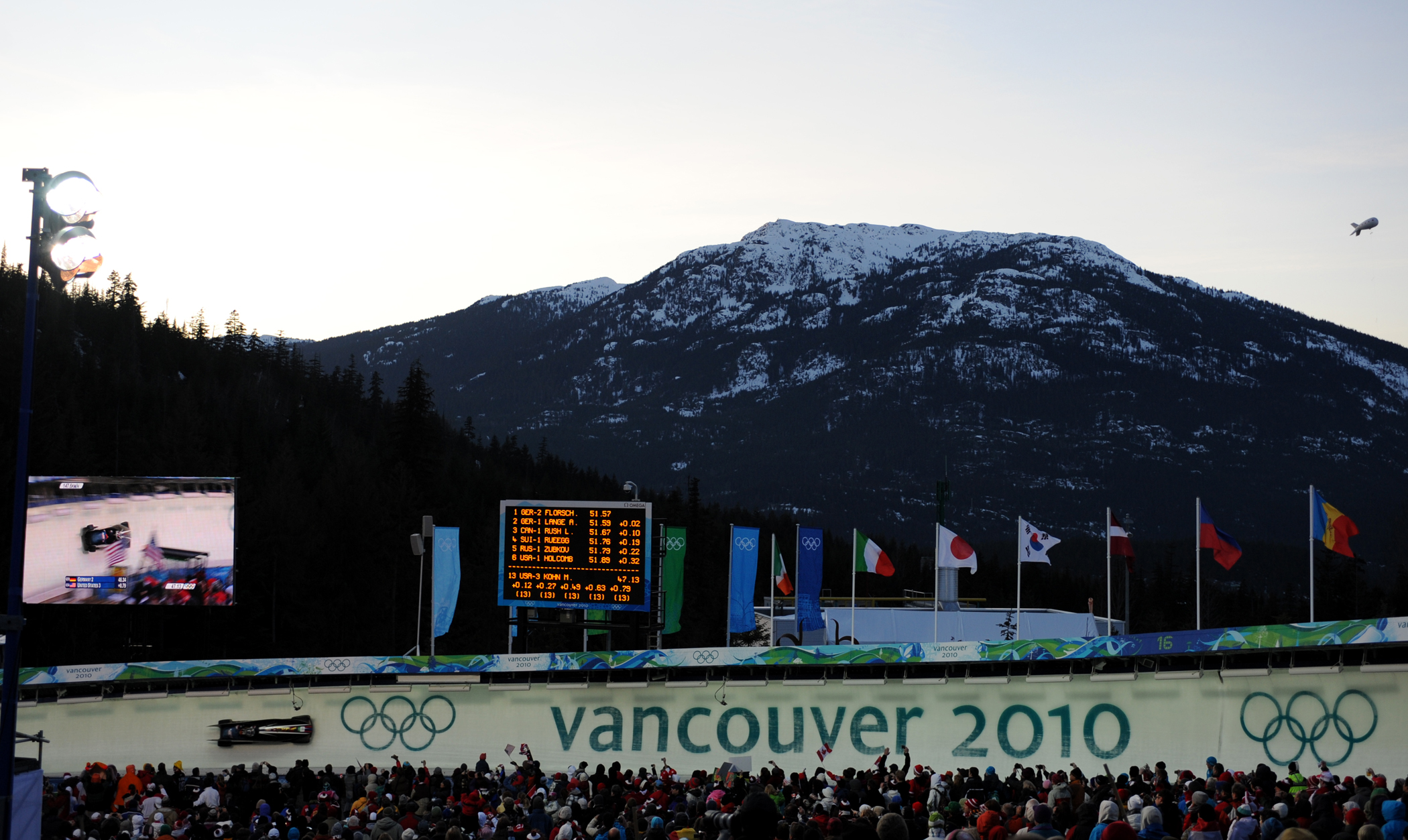
Army National Guard Outstanding Athlete Program bobsled pilot Sgt. Mike Kohn drives USA-3 through Turn 11 at Whistler Sliding Centre during the first heat of the Olympic two-man bobsled event on Saturday during the 2010 Winter Olympics.

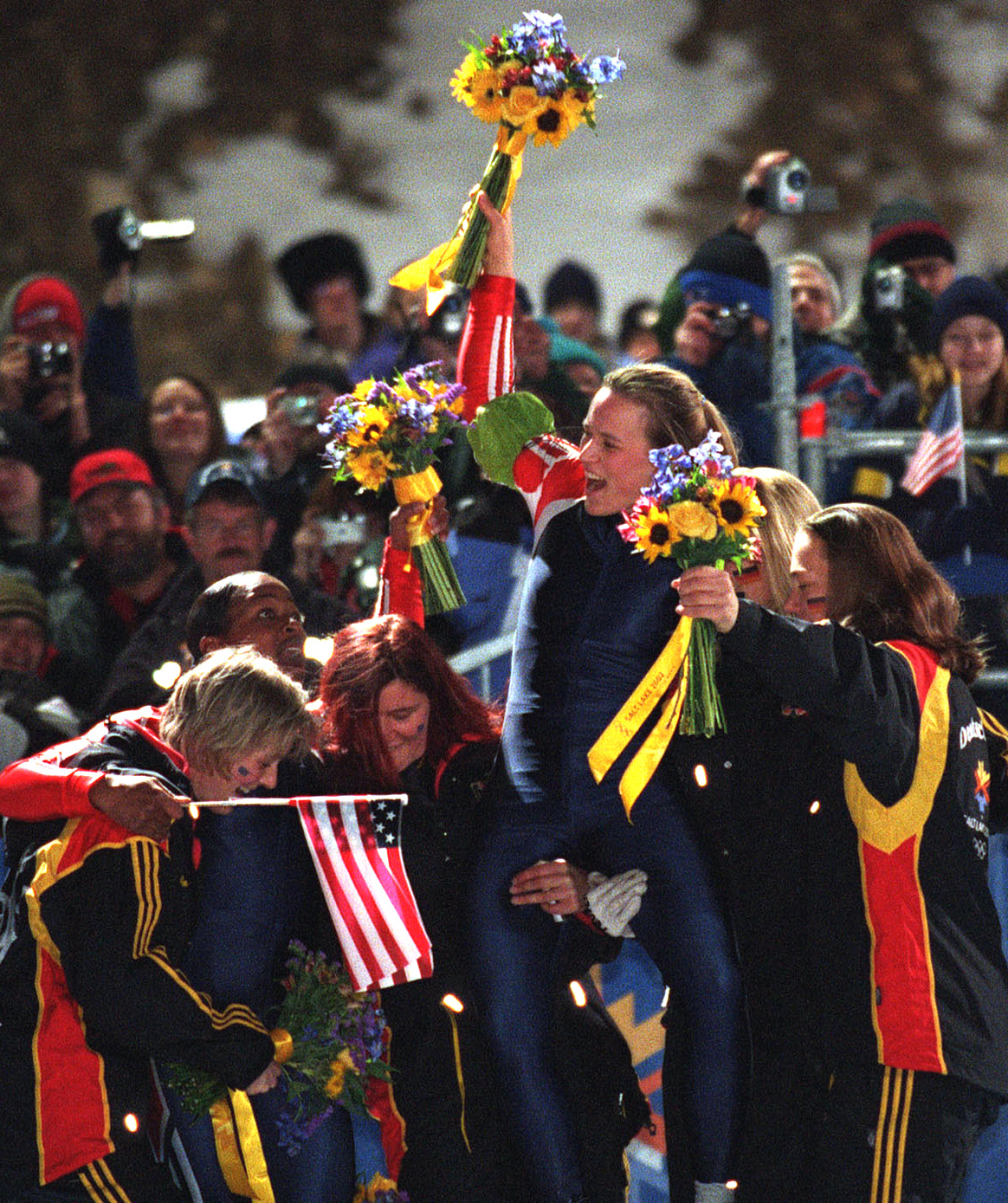
Jill Bakken holds flowers aloft and enjoys her moment of triumph after winning the gold in the first-ever women's Olympic bobsled race 19 February. Her brakeman Vonetta Flowers is also being lifted by teammates on the left.

Bobsleigh is an Olympic sport that is contested at the Winter Olympic Games. The sport was included in the first Winter Olympics in 1924 and has been held at every Olympics since, except 1960. The four-man event, which was first held in 1924, was switched to a five-man event in 1928. The two-man event was introduced at the 1932 Lake Placid games and a two-woman event was first contested at the 2002 Salt Lake City Olympics.

== Four-man ==
The numbers in brackets denotes bobsledders who won gold medal in corresponding disciplines more than one time. Bold numbers denotes record number of victories in certain disciplines.

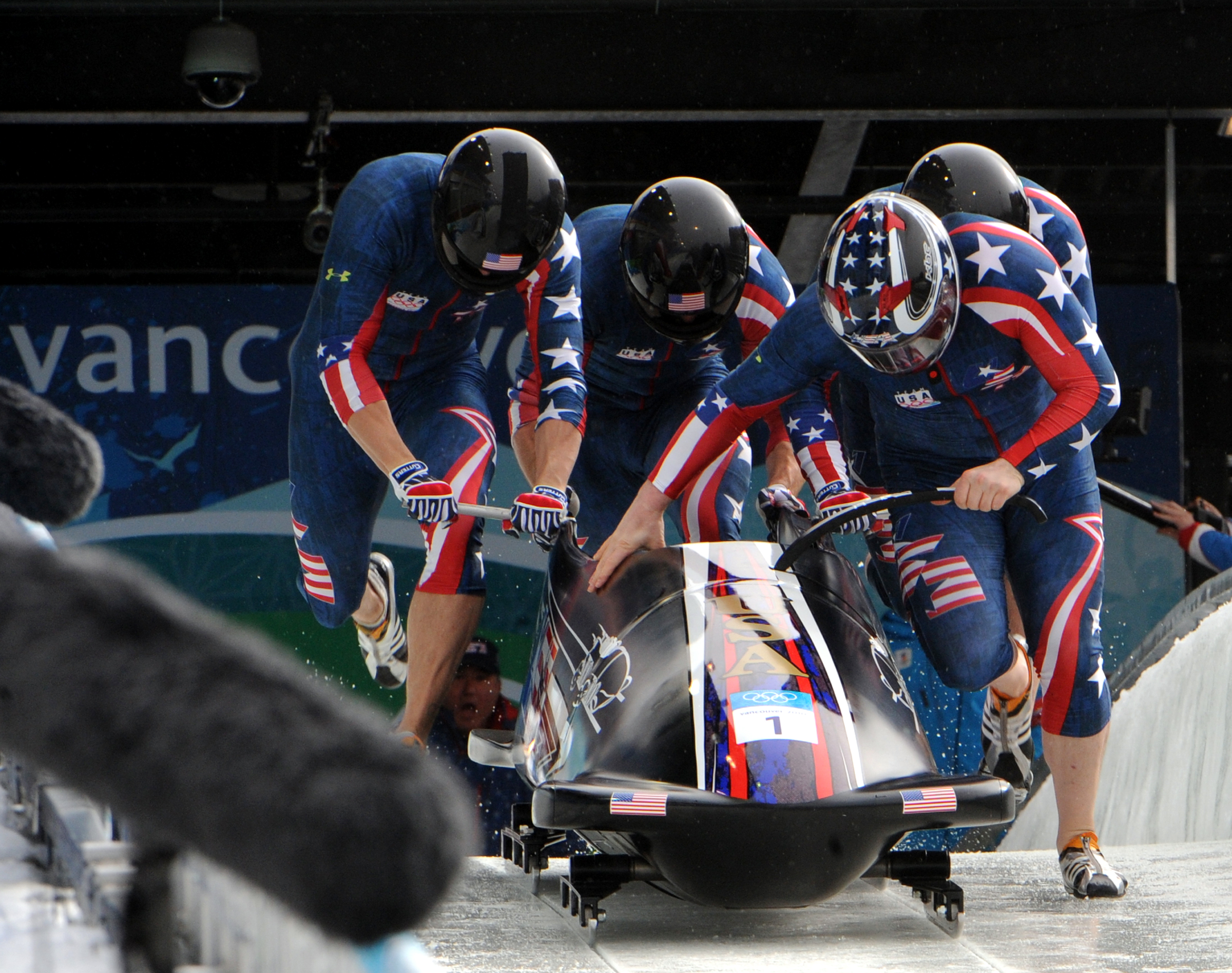
Former Army World Class Athlete Program bobsledder Steven Holcomb, front right, leads USA-1, AKA "The Night Train", team of Justin Olsen, Steve Mesler and Curtis Tomasevicz to a start time of 4.77 seconds in the third heat of the Olympic four-man bobsled event in Whistler, British Columbia at the 2010 Winter Olympics. The quartet won the first U.S. Olympic gold medal in the sport in 62 years.

Games	Gold	Silver	Bronze
1924 Chamonix	Switzerland; Eduard Scherrer; Alfred Neveu; Alfred Schläppi; Heinrich Schläppi	Great Britain; Ralph Broome; Thomas Arnold; Alexander Richardson; Rodney Soher	Belgium; Charles Mulder; René Mortiaux; Paul Van den Broeck; Victor Verschueren; Henri Willems
1928 St. Moritz	United States; William Fiske; Nion Tucker; Geoffrey Mason; Clifford Gray; Richard Parke	United States; Jennison Heaton; David Granger; Lyman Hine; Thomas Doe; Jay O'Brien	Germany; Hanns Kilian; Hans Hess; Sebastian Huber; Valentin Krempl; Hanns Nägle
1932 Lake Placid	United States; William Fiske **(2)**; Eddie Eagan; Clifford Gray **(2)**; Jay O'Brien	United States; Henry Homburger; Percy Bryant; Francis Stevens; Edmund Horton	Germany; Hans Mehlhorn; Max Ludwig; Hanns Kilian; Sebastian Huber
1936 Garmisch- Partenkirchen	Switzerland; Pierre Musy; Arnold Gartmann; Charles Bouvier; Joseph Beerli	Switzerland; Reto Capadrutt; Hans Aichele; Fritz Feierabend; Hans Bütikofer	Great Britain; Frederick McEvoy; James Cardno; Guy Dugdale; Charles Green
1948 St. Moritz	United States; Francis Tyler; Patrick Martin; Edward Rimkus; William D'Amico	Belgium; Max Houben; Freddy Mansveld; Louis-Georges Niels; Jacques Mouvet	United States; James Bickford; Thomas Hicks; Donald Dupree; William Dupree
1952 Oslo	Germany; Andreas Ostler; Friedrich Kuhn; Lorenz Nieberl; Franz Kemser	United States; Stanley Benham; Patrick Martin; Howard Crossett; James Atkinson	Switzerland; Fritz Feierabend; Albert Madörin; André Filippini; Stephan Waser
1956 Cortina d'Ampezzo	Switzerland; Franz Kapus; Gottfried Diener; Robert Alt; Heinrich Angst	Italy; Eugenio Monti; Ulrico Girardi; Renzo Alverà; Renato Mocellini	United States; Arthur Tyler; William Dodge; Charles Butler; James Lamy
1960 Squaw Valley	not held at these Games		
1964 Innsbruck	Canada; Vic Emery; Peter Kirby; Douglas Anakin; John Emery	Austria; Erwin Thaler; Adolf Koxeder; Josef Nairz; Reinhold Durnthaler	Italy; Eugenio Monti; Sergio Siorpaes; Benito Rigoni; Gildo Siorpaes
1968 Grenoble	Italy; Eugenio Monti; Luciano de Paolis; Roberto Zandonella; Mario Armano	Austria; Erwin Thaler; Reinhold Durnthaler; Herbert Gruber; Josef Eder	Switzerland; Jean Wicki; Hans Candrian; Willi Hofmann; Walter Graf
1972 Sapporo	Switzerland; Jean Wicki; Edy Hubacher; Hans Leutenegger; Werner Carmichel	Italy; Nevio de Zordo; Gianni Bonichon; Adriano Frassinelli; Corrado dal Fabbro	West Germany; Wolfgang Zimmerer; Peter Utzschneider; Stefan Gaisreiter; Walter Steinbauer
1976 Innsbruck	East Germany; Meinhard Nehmer; Jochen Babock; Bernhard Germeshausen; Bernhard Lehmann	Switzerland; Erich Schärer; Ulrich Bächli; Rudolf Marti; Joseph Benz	West Germany; Wolfgang Zimmerer; Peter Utzschneider; Bodo Bittner; Manfred Schumann
1980 Lake Placid	East Germany; Meinhard Nehmer **(2)**; Bogdan Musioł; Bernhard Germeshausen **(2)**; Hans-Jürgen Gerhardt	Switzerland; Erich Schärer; Ulrich Bächli; Rudolf Marti; Joseph Benz	East Germany; Horst Schönau; Roland Wetzig; Detlef Richter; Andreas Kirchner
1984 Sarajevo	East Germany; Wolfgang Hoppe; Roland Wetzig; Dietmar Schauerhammer; Andreas Kirchner	East Germany; Bernhard Lehmann; Bogdan Musioł; Ingo Voge; Eberhard Weise	Switzerland; Silvio Giobellina; Heinz Stettler; Urs Salzmann; Rico Freiermuth
1988 Calgary	Switzerland; Ekkehard Fasser; Kurt Meier; Marcel Fässler; Werner Stocker	East Germany; Wolfgang Hoppe; Dietmar Schauerhammer; Bogdan Musioł; Ingo Voge	Soviet Union; Jānis Ķipurs; Guntis Osis; Juris Tone; Vladimir Koslov
1992 Albertville	Austria; Ingo Appelt; Harald Winkler; Gerhard Haidacher; Thomas Schroll	Germany; Wolfgang Hoppe; Bogdan Musioł; Axel Kühn; René Hannemann	Switzerland; Gustav Weder; Donat Acklin; Lorenz Schindelholz; Curdin Morell
1994 Lillehammer	Germany; Harald Czudaj; Karsten Brannasch; Olaf Hampel; Alexander Szelig	Switzerland; Gustav Weder; Donat Acklin; Kurt Meier; Domenico Semeraro	Germany; Wolfgang Hoppe; Ulf Hielscher; René Hannemann; Carsten Embach
1998 Nagano	Germany; Christoph Langen; Markus Zimmermann; Marco Jakobs; Olaf Hampel **(2)**	Switzerland; Marcel Rohner; Markus Nüssli; Markus Wasser; Beat Seitz	France; Bruno Mingeon; Emmanuel Hostache; Éric Le Chanony; Max Robert
1998 Nagano	Germany; Christoph Langen; Markus Zimmermann; Marco Jakobs; Olaf Hampel **(2)**	Switzerland; Marcel Rohner; Markus Nüssli; Markus Wasser; Beat Seitz	Great Britain; Sean Olsson; Dean Ward; Courtney Rumbolt; Paul Attwood
2002 Salt Lake City	Germany; André Lange; Enrico Kühn; Kevin Kuske; Carsten Embach	United States; Todd Hays; Randy Jones; Bill Schuffenhauer; Garrett Hines	United States; Brian Shimer; Mike Kohn; Doug Sharp; Dan Steele
2006 Turin	Germany; André Lange **(2)**; René Hoppe; Kevin Kuske **(2)**; Martin Putze	Russia; Alexandr Zubkov; Filipp Yegorov; Alexei Seliverstov; Alexey Voyevoda	Switzerland; Martin Annen; Thomas Lamparter; Beat Hefti; Cédric Grand
2010 Vancouver	United States; Steven Holcomb; Steve Mesler; Curt Tomasevicz; Justin Olsen	Germany; André Lange; Kevin Kuske; Alexander Rödiger; Martin Putze	Canada; Lyndon Rush; David Bissett; Lascelles Brown; Chris le Bihan
2014 Sochi	Latvia; Oskars Melbārdis; Arvis Vilkaste; Daumants Dreiškens; Jānis Strenga	United States; Steven Holcomb; Steven Langton; Curtis Tomasevicz; Christopher Fogt	Great Britain; John James Jackson; Bruce Tasker; Stuart Benson; Joel Fearon
2018 Pyeongchang	Germany; Francesco Friedrich; Arndt Bauer; Martin Grothkopp; Thorsten Margis	Germany; Nico Walther; Kevin Kuske; Alexander Rödiger; Eric Franke	None awarded
2018 Pyeongchang	Germany; Francesco Friedrich; Arndt Bauer; Martin Grothkopp; Thorsten Margis	South Korea; Won Yun-jong; Jun Jung-lin; Seo Young-woo; Kim Dong-hyun	None awarded
2022 Beijing	Germany; Francesco Friedrich; Thorsten Margis; Arndt Bauer; Alexander Schüller	Germany; Johannes Lochner; Florian Bauer; Christopher Weber; Christian Rasp	Canada; Justin Kripps; Ryan Sommer; Cam Stones; Ben Coakwell
2026 Milano Cortina	Germany; Johannes Lochner; Thorsten Margis; Jörn Wenzel; Georg Fleischhauer	Germany; Francesco Friedrich; Matthias Sommer; Alexander Schüller; Felix Straub	Switzerland; Michael Vogt; Andreas Haas; Amadou David Ndiaye; Mario Aeberhard

- Medals:

Rank	Nation	Gold	Silver	Bronze	Total
1	Germany	**8**	**5**	3	16
2	Switzerland	5	**5**	**6**	**16**
3	United States	4	**5**	3	12
4	East Germany	3	2	1	6
5	Italy	1	2	1	4
6	Austria	1	2	0	3
7	Canada	1	0	2	3
8	Latvia	1	0	0	1
9	Great Britain	0	1	3	4
10	Belgium	0	1	1	2
11	Russia	0	1	0	1
11	South Korea	0	1	0	1
13	West Germany	0	0	2	2
14	France	0	0	1	1
14	Soviet Union	0	0	1	1
Total		24	25	24	73

== Two-man ==
The numbers in brackets denotes bobsledders who won gold medal in corresponding disciplines more than one time. Bold numbers denotes record number of victories in certain disciplines.

Games	Gold	Silver	Bronze
1932 Lake Placid	United States; Hubert Stevens; Curtis Stevens	Switzerland; Reto Capadrutt; Oscar Geier	United States; John Heaton; Robert Minton
1936 Garmisch- Partenkirchen	United States; Ivan Brown; Alan Washbond	Switzerland; Fritz Feierabend; Joseph Beerli	United States; Gilbert Colgate; Richard Lawrence
1948 St. Moritz	Switzerland; Felix Endrich; Friedrich Waller	Switzerland; Fritz Feierabend; Paul Eberhard	United States; Frederick Fortune; Schuyler Carron
1952 Oslo	Germany; Andreas Ostler; Lorenz Nieberl	United States; Stanley Benham; Patrick Martin	Switzerland; Fritz Feierabend; Stephan Waser
1956 Cortina d'Ampezzo	Italy; Lamberto Dalla Costa; Giacomo Conti	Italy; Eugenio Monti; Renzo Alverà	Switzerland; Max Angst; Harry Warburton
1960 Squaw Valley	not held at these Games		
1964 Innsbruck	Great Britain; Anthony Nash; Robin Dixon	Italy; Sergio Zardini; Romano Bonagura	Italy; Eugenio Monti; Sergio Siorpaes
1968 Grenoble	Italy; Eugenio Monti; Luciano de Paolis	West Germany; Horst Floth; Pepi Bader	Romania; Ion Panţuru; Nicolae Neagoe
1972 Sapporo	West Germany; Wolfgang Zimmerer; Peter Utzschneider	West Germany; Horst Floth; Pepi Bader	Switzerland; Jean Wicki; Edy Hubacher
1976 Innsbruck	East Germany; Meinhard Nehmer; Bernhard Germeshausen	West Germany; Wolfgang Zimmerer; Manfred Schumann	Switzerland; Erich Schärer; Joseph Benz
1980 Lake Placid	Switzerland; Erich Schärer; Joseph Benz	East Germany; Bernhard Germeshausen; Hans-Jürgen Gerhardt	East Germany; Meinhard Nehmer; Bogdan Musioł
1984 Sarajevo	East Germany; Wolfgang Hoppe; Dietmar Schauerhammer	East Germany; Bernhard Lehmann; Bogdan Musioł	Soviet Union; Zintis Ekmanis; Vladimir Aleksandrov
1988 Calgary	Soviet Union; Jānis Ķipurs; Vladimir Kozlov	East Germany; Wolfgang Hoppe; Bogdan Musioł	East Germany; Bernhard Lehmann; Mario Hoyer
1992 Albertville	Switzerland; Gustav Weder; Donat Acklin	Germany; Rudolf Lochner; Markus Zimmermann	Germany; Christoph Langen; Günther Eger
1994 Lillehammer	Switzerland; Gustav Weder; Donat Acklin	Switzerland; Reto Götschi; Guido Acklin	Italy; Günther Huber; Stefano Ticci
1998 Nagano	Canada; Pierre Lueders; David MacEachern	None awarded	Germany; Christoph Langen; Markus Zimmermann
1998 Nagano	Italy; Günther Huber; Antonio Tartaglia	None awarded	Germany; Christoph Langen; Markus Zimmermann
2002 Salt Lake City	Germany; Christoph Langen; Markus Zimmermann	Switzerland; Christian Reich; Steve Anderhub	Switzerland; Martin Annen; Beat Hefti
2006 Turin	Germany; André Lange; Kevin Kuske	Canada; Pierre Lueders; Lascelles Brown	Switzerland; Martin Annen; Beat Hefti
2010 Vancouver	Germany; André Lange; Kevin Kuske	Germany; Thomas Florschütz; Richard Adjei	Russia; Alexandr Zubkov; Alexey Voyevoda
2014 Sochi	Switzerland; Beat Hefti; Alex Baumann	United States; Steven Holcomb; Steven Langton	Latvia; Oskars Melbārdis; Daumants Dreiskens
2018 Pyeongchang	Canada; Justin Kripps; Alexander Kopacz	None awarded	Latvia; Oskars Melbārdis; Jānis Strenga
2018 Pyeongchang	Germany; Francesco Friedrich; Thorsten Margis	None awarded	Latvia; Oskars Melbārdis; Jānis Strenga
2022 Beijing	Germany; Francesco Friedrich; Thorsten Margis	Germany; Johannes Lochner; Florian Bauer	Germany; Christoph Hafer; Matthias Sommer
2026 Milano Cortina	Germany; Johannes Lochner; Georg Fleischhauer	Germany; Francesco Friedrich; Alexander Schüller	Germany; Adam Ammour; Alexander Schaller

- Medals:

Rank	Nation	Gold	Silver	Bronze	Total
1	Germany	**7**	4	4	15
2	Switzerland	5	**5**	**6**	**16**
3	Italy	3	2	2	7
4	East Germany	2	3	2	7
5	United States	2	2	3	7
6	Canada	2	1	0	3
7	West Germany	1	3	0	4
8	Soviet Union	1	0	1	2
9	Great Britain	1	0	0	1
10	Latvia	0	0	2	2
11	Romania	0	0	1	1
11	Russia	0	0	1	1
Total		23	19	21	63

== Two-woman ==
The numbers in brackets denotes bobsledders who won gold medal in corresponding disciplines more than one time. Bold numbers denotes record number of victories in certain disciplines.

Games	Gold	Silver	Bronze
2002 Salt Lake City	United States; Jill Bakken; Vonetta Flowers	Germany; Sandra Prokoff; Ulrike Holzner	Germany; Susi Erdmann; Nicole Herschmann
2006 Turin	Germany; Sandra Kiriasis; Anja Schneiderheinze	United States; Shauna Rohbock; Valerie Fleming	Italy; Gerda Weissensteiner; Jennifer Isacco
2010 Vancouver	Canada; Kaillie Humphries; Heather Moyse	Canada; Helen Upperton; Shelley-Ann Brown	United States; Erin Pac; Elana Meyers
2014 Sochi	Canada; Kaillie Humphries; Heather Moyse	United States; Elana Meyers; Lauryn Williams	United States; Jamie Greubel; Aja Evans
2018 Pyeongchang	Germany; Mariama Jamanka; Lisa Buckwitz	United States; Elana Meyers; Lauren Gibbs	Canada; Kaillie Humphries; Phylicia George
2022 Beijing	Germany; Laura Nolte; Deborah Levi	Germany; Mariama Jamanka; Alexandra Burghardt	United States; Elana Meyers; Sylvia Hoffman
2026 Milano Cortina	Germany; Laura Nolte; Deborah Levi	Germany; Lisa Buckwitz; Neele Schuten	United States; Kaillie Humphries; Jasmine Jones

- Medals:

Rank	Nation	Gold	Silver	Bronze	Total
**1**	Germany	**4**	3	1	**8**
**2**	Canada	**2**	1	1	4
**3**	United States	1	**3**	**4**	**8**
**4**	Italy	0	0	1	1
Total		7	7	7	21

== Women's monobob ==
Games	Gold	Silver	Bronze
2022 Beijing	Kaillie Humphries; United States	Elana Meyers; United States	Christine de Bruin; Canada
2026 Milano Cortina	Elana Meyers Taylor; United States	Laura Nolte; Germany	Kaillie Armbruster Humphries; United States

- Medals:

Rank	Nation	Gold	Silver	Bronze	Total
1	United States	2	1	1	4
2	Germany	0	1	0	1
3	Canada	0	0	1	1
Total		2	2	2	6

== Statistics ==
=== Medal table ===
Rank	Nation	Gold	Silver	Bronze	Total
1	Germany	16	9	7	32
2	Switzerland	10	10	11	31
3	United States	8	11	9	28
4	East Germany	5	5	3	13
5	Canada	5	2	4	11
6	Italy	4	4	4	12
7	West Germany	1	3	2	6
8	Austria	1	2	0	3
9	Great Britain	1	1	3	5
10	Latvia	1	0	2	3
10	Soviet Union	1	0	2	3
12	Belgium	0	1	1	2
12	Russia	0	1	1	2
14	South Korea	0	1	0	1
15	France	0	0	1	1
15	Romania	0	0	1	1
Totals (16 entries)		**53**	**50**	**51**	**154**

=== Bobsledders medal leaders ===
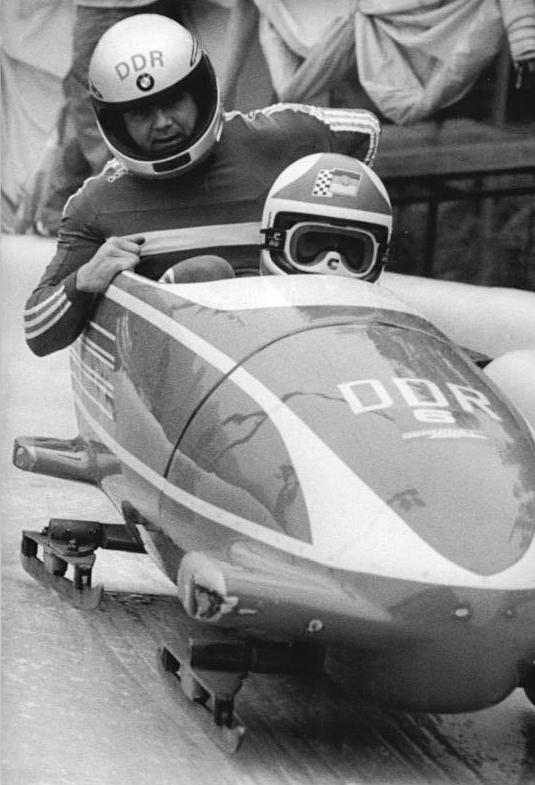
East German brakeman Bogdan Musioł participated in five Winter Olympics and won record 7 medals, including gold in 1980.

Men

Biathlete	Nation	Olympics *	Status **	Gold	Silver	Bronze	Total
Bogdan Musiol	East Germany; Germany	1980–1994	B	1	5	1	7
Kevin Kuske	Germany	2002–2018	B	4	2	0	6
Wolfgang Hoppe	East Germany; Germany	1984–1994	P	2	3	1	6
Eugenio Monti	Italy	1956, 1964–1968	P	2	2	2	6
André Lange	Germany	2002–2010	P	4	1	0	5
Fritz Feierabend	Switzerland	1936, 1948–1952	B/P	0	3	2	5
Francesco Friedrich	Germany	2018–**2022**	P	4	0	0	4
Thorsten Margis	Germany	2018–**2022**	B	4	0	0	4
Bernhard Germeshausen	East Germany	1976–1980	B/P	3	1	0	4
Meinhard Nehmer	East Germany	1976–1980	P	3	0	1	4
Donat Acklin	Switzerland	1988–1994	B	2	1	1	4
Gustav Weder	Switzerland	1988–1994	P	2	1	1	4
Markus Zimmermann	Germany	1992–2002	B	2	1	1	4
Christoph Langen	West Germany; Germany	1988–1992, 1998–2002	B/P	2	0	2	4
Joseph Benz	Switzerland	1976–1980	B	1	2	1	4
Bernhard Lehmann	East Germany	1976, 1984–1988	B/P	1	2	1	4
Erich Schärer	Switzerland	1976–1980	P	1	2	1	4
Wolfgang Zimmerer	West Germany	1968–1976	P	1	1	2	4
Beat Hefti	Switzerland	2002–2014	B/P	1	0	3	4

Women

Biathlete	Nation	Olympics *	Status **	Gold	Silver	Bronze	Total
Kaillie Humphries	Canada; United States	2010–**2026**	P	3	0	3	6
Elana Meyers Taylor	United States	2010–**2026**	B/P	1	3	2	6
Heather Moyse	Canada	2006–2018	B	2	0	0	2
Sandra Kiriasis (Prokoff)	Germany	2002–2014	P	1	1	0	2
Mariama Jamanka	Germany	2018–**2022**	P	1	1	0	2

* denotes all Olympics in which mentioned athletes took part. Boldface denotes latest Olympics.
** Status: B - participated at Olympics as brakeman, P - participated at Olympics as pilot, B/P - participated at Olympics both as brakeman and as pilot.

=== Most successful bobsledders ===
Top 10 most successful bobsledders (by number of victories) at the Winter Olympics are listed below. Boldface denotes active bobsledders and highest medal count among all bobsledders (including these who not included in these tables) per type.

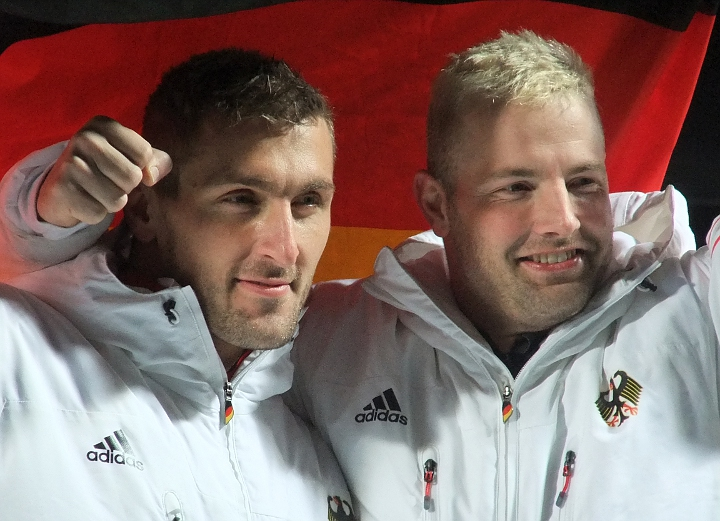
In 2002–2010, German brakeman Kevin Kuske (left) and pilot André Lange (right) won 5 Olympic medals together, including record 4 golds and one silver. In 2018 Kevin Kuske won another silver medal therefore becoming the most successful bobsledder in Olympic history.

==== Men ====
Rank	Bobsledder	Country	From *	To *	Gold	Silver	Bronze	Total	Status **
1	Kevin Kuske	Germany	2002	2018	**4**	2	-	**6**	B
2	André Lange	Germany	2002	2010	**4**	1	-	5	P
3	**Francesco Friedrich**	Germany	2018	2022	**4**	-	-	4	P
3	**Thorsten Margis**	Germany	2018	2022	**4**	-	-	4	B
5	Bernhard Germeshausen	East Germany	1976	1980	3	1	-	4	B/P
6	Meinhard Nehmer	East Germany	1976	1980	3	-	1	4	P
7	Wolfgang Hoppe	East Germany; Germany	1984	1994	2	**3**	1	**6**	P
8	Eugenio Monti	Italy	1956	1968	2	2	**2**	**6**	P
9	Donat Acklin	Switzerland	1992	1994	2	1	1	4	B
9	Gustav Weder	Switzerland	1992	1994	2	1	1	4	P
9	Markus Zimmermann	Germany	1992	2002	2	1	1	4	B

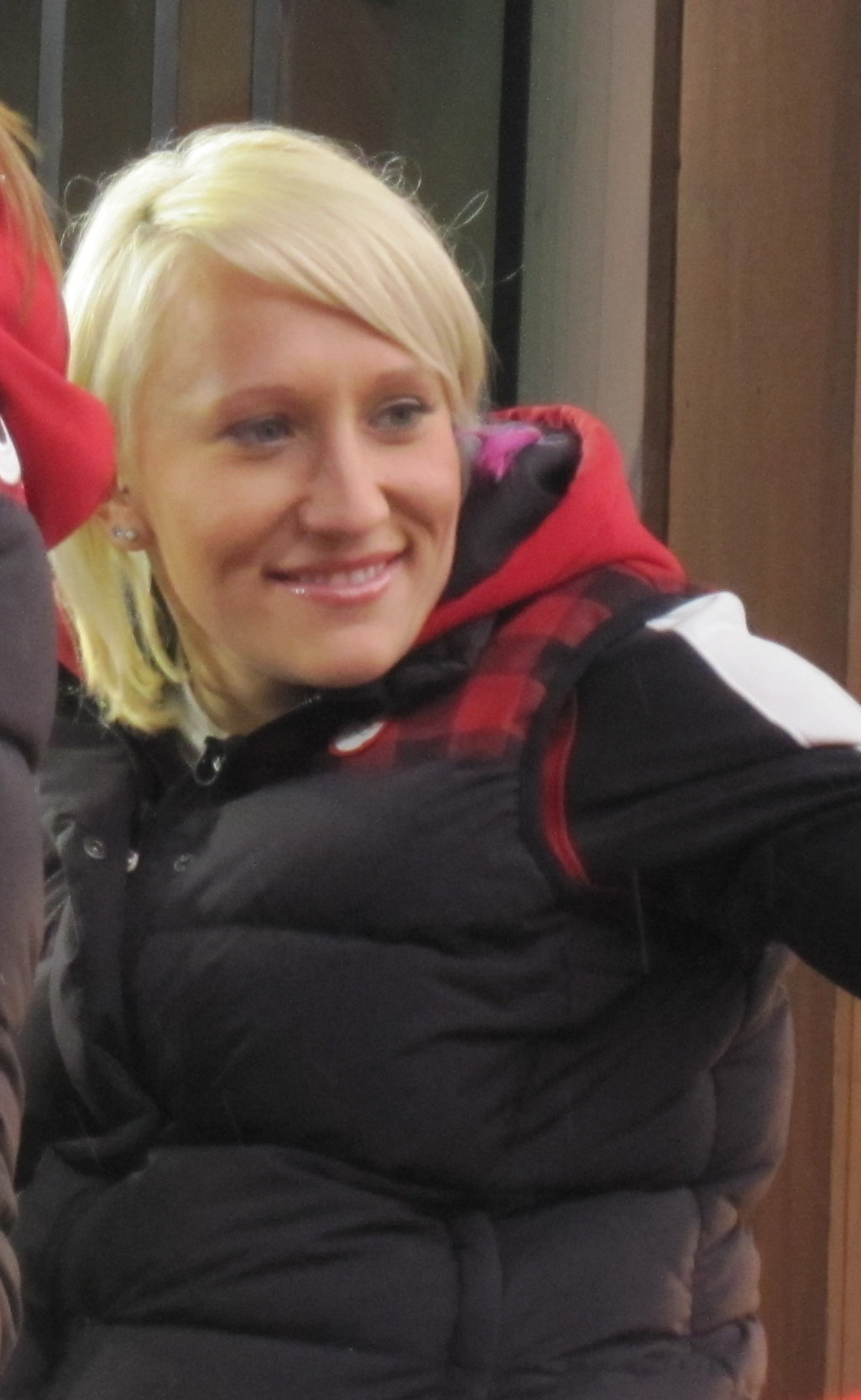
Canadian pilot Kaillie Humphries is the most successful female bobsledder in Olympic history. In 2010 and 2014 she and Heather Moyse won record 2 gold medals. In 2018 Kaillie Humphries won bronze medal in pair with Phylicia George.

==== Women ====
Rank	Bobsledder	Country	From *	To *	Gold	Silver	Bronze	Total	Status **
1	**Kaillie Humphries**	Canada; United States	2010	2026	**3**	-	3	6	P
2	**Laura Nolte**	Germany	2022	2026	**2**	1	-	3	P
3	**Deborah Levi**	Germany	2022	2026	2	-	-	2	B
3	**Heather Moyse**	Canada	2010	2014	2	-	-	2	B
5	**Elana Meyers Taylor**	United States	2010	2026	1	**3**	**2**	**6**	B/P
6	**Lisa Buckwitz**	Germany	2018	2026	1	1	-	2	B/P
6	Sandra Kiriasis (Prokoff)	Germany	2002	2006	1	1	-	2	P
6	Mariama Jamanka	Germany	2018	2022	1	1	-	2	P
9	Jill Bakken	United States	2002	2002	1	-	-	1	P
9	Vonetta Flowers	United States	2002	2002	1	-	-	1	B
9	Anja Schneiderheinze	Germany	2006	2006	1	-	-	1	B
12	Shelley-Ann Brown	Canada	2010	2010	-	1	-	1	B
12	Alexandra Burghardt	Germany	2022	2022	-	1	-	1	B
12	Valerie Fleming	United States	2006	2006	-	1	-	1	B
12	**Lauren Gibbs**	United States	2018	2018	-	1	-	1	B
12	Ulrike Holzner	Germany	2002	2002	-	1	-	1	B
12	Shauna Rohbock	United States	2006	2006	-	1	-	1	P
12	Helen Upperton	Canada	2010	2010	-	1	-	1	P
12	Lauryn Williams	United States	2014	2014	-	1	-	1	B

* denotes only those Olympics at which mentioned biathletes won at least one medal
** Status: B - won Olympic medals as brakeman, P - won Olympic medals as Olympics as pilot, B/P - won Olympic medals both as brakeman and as pilot.

== Medals per year ==
×	NOC did not exist or did not participate in bobsleigh events	#	Number of medals won by the NOC	–	NOC did not win any medals

- bolded numbers indicate the highest medal count at that year's Olympic Games.

NOC	24	28	32	36	48	52	56	60	64	68	72	76	80	84	88	92	94	98	02	06	10	14	18	Total
Austria	×	–	–	–	×	–	–	×	1	1	–	–	–	–	–	1	–	–	–	–	–	–	–	3
Belgium	1	–	–	–	1	–	–	×	–	×	×	×	×	×	×	×	×	×	×	×	–	–	–	2
Canada	×	×	×	×	×	×	×	×	1	–	–	–	–	–	–	–	–	1	–	1	3	1	2	9
France	–	–	–	–	–	–	–	×	×	–	–	–	×	–	×	–	–	1	–	–	×	–	–	1
East Germany	×	×	×	×	×	×	×	×	×	×	×	2	4	4	3	×	×	×	×	×	×	×	×	13
West Germany	×	×	×	×	×	×	×	×	×	1	3	2	–	–	–	×	×	×	×	×	×	×	×	6
Germany	×	1	1	–	×	2	×	×	×	×	×	×	×	×	×	3	2	2	4	3	3	–	4	25
Great Britain	1	–	×	1	–	×	–	×	1	–	–	–	–	–	–	–	–	1	–	–	–	1	–	5
Italy	–	–	–	–	–	–	3	×	3	2	1	–	–	–	–	–	1	1	–	1	–	–	–	12
Latvia	×	×	×	×	×	×	×	×	×	×	×	×	×	×	×	–	–	–	–	–	–	2	1	3
Romania	×	–	–	–	×	×	–	×	–	1	–	–	–	–	–	–	–	–	–	–	–	–	–	1
Russia	×	×	×	×	×	×	×	×	×	×	×	×	×	×	×	×	–	–	–	1	1	–	×	2
South Korea	×	×	×	×	×	×	×	×	×	×	×	×	×	×	×	×	×	×	×	×	–	–	1	1
Soviet Union	×	×	×	×	×	×	×	×	×	×	×	×	×	1	2	×	×	×	×	×	×	×	×	3
Switzerland	1	–	1	3	2	2	2	×	–	1	2	2	2	1	1	2	3	1	2	2	–	1	–	31
United States	×	2	4	2	3	2	1	×	–	–	–	–	–	–	–	–	–	–	3	1	2	4	1	25

=== Medal sweep events ===
These are events in which athletes from one NOC won all three medals.

Games	Event	NOC	Gold	Silver	Bronze
2022 Beijing	Two-man	Germany	Francesco Friedrich; Thorsten Margis	Johannes Lochner; Florian Bauer	Christoph Hafer; Matthias Sommer
2026 Milano Cortina	Two-man	Germany	Johannes Lochner; Georg Fleischhauer	Francesco Friedrich; Alexander Schüller	Adam Ammour; Alexander Schaller

== See also ==
- IBSF World Championships
- Bobsleigh World Cup
