= Great Britain at the 1924 Winter Olympics =

- Flag of the United Kingdom
- IOC code: GBR
- NOC: British Olympic Association

in Chamonix
- Competitors: 44 (41 men, 3 women) in 6 sports
- Medals Ranked 6th: Gold 1 Silver 1 Bronze 2 Total 4

Winter Olympics appearances (overview)
- 1924; 1928; 1932; 1936; 1948; 1952; 1956; 1960; 1964; 1968; 1972; 1976; 1980; 1984; 1988; 1992; 1994; 1998; 2002; 2006; 2010; 2014; 2018; 2022; 2026

The United Kingdom of Great Britain and Northern Ireland competed as Great Britain at the 1924 Winter Olympics in Chamonix, France. Based on medal count, this was Great Britain's best ever performance at a Winter Olympic Games until the 2014 games were held in Sochi in Russia. On 3 February Great Britain won two medals on one day. This was not to be bettered until the 2018 games when 3 medals were won on one day.

== Medallists ==
Medal	Name	Sport	Event
Gold	William Jackson; Thomas Murray; Robin Welsh; Laurence Jackson	Curling	Men's event
Silver	Ralph Broome; Thomas Arnold; Alexander Richardson; Rodney Soher	Bobsleigh	Four/five-man
Bronze	Ethel Muckelt	Figure skating	Women's singles
Bronze	Great Britain men's national ice hockey team: Colin Carruthers; Eric Carruthers; Ross Cuthbert; Lorne Carr-Harris; Blane Sexton; Edward Pitblado; Hamilton Jukes; William Anderson; Geoffrey Holmes; Guy Clarkson	Ice hockey	Men's competition

== Bobsleigh ==
Sled	Athletes	Event	Run 1		Run 2		Run 3		Run 4		Total	
Sled	Athletes	Event	Time	Rank	Time	Rank	Time	Rank	Time	Rank	Time	Rank
GBR-1	Ralph Broome; Thomas Arnold; Alexander Richardson; Rodney Soher	Four/five-man	1:28.73	2	1:28.67	2	1:25.76	2	1:25.67	1	5:48.83	2nd place, silver medalist(s)
GBR-2	William Horton; Archibald Crabbe; Gerard Fairlie; George Pim	Four/five-man	1:42.33	5	1:41.28	5	1:38.58	5	1:38.52	5	6:40.71	5

== Curling ==
Team	GP	W	L	PF	PA	PTS
Great Britain (gold)	2	2	0	84	11	4
Sweden	2	1	1	25	48	2
France	2	0	2	14	64	0

Team 1	Score	Team 2
Great Britain	38-7	Sweden (I)
Great Britain	46-4	France

Pos.	Player
Skip	Willie Jackson
	Robin Welsh
	Thomas Murray
	Laurence Jackson

== Figure skating ==
Men

Athlete	Event	CF	FS	Points	Places	Final rank
Herbert Clarke	Men's singles	10	11	219.75	70	10
Jack Page	Men's singles	6	5	295.36	36	5

Women

Athlete	Event	CF	FS	Points	Places	Final rank
Kathleen Shaw	Women's singles	8	6	221.00	46	7
Ethel Muckelt	Women's singles	3	7	250.07	26	3rd place, bronze medalist(s)

Pairs

Athletes	Points	Score	Final rank
Mildred Richardson; Tyke Richardson	57	7.68	8
Ethel Muckelt; Jack Page	30.5	9.93	4

== Ice hockey ==
=== Group B ===
The top two teams (highlighted) advanced to the medal round.

Team	GP	W	L	GF	GA
United States	3	3	0	52	0
Great Britain	3	2	1	34	16
France	3	1	2	9	42
Belgium	3	0	3	8	45

29 Jan	France	2:15 (1:5,1:3,0:7)	Great Britain
30 Jan	Great Britain	19:3 (8:1,6:1,5:1)	Belgium
31 Jan	United States	11:0 (6:0,2:0,3:0)	Great Britain

=== Medal round ===
Results from the group round (Canada-Sweden and United States-Great Britain) carried forward to the medal round.

Team	GP	W	L	GF	GA
Canada	3	3	0	47	3
United States	3	2	1	32	6
Great Britain (bronze)	3	1	2	6	33
Sweden	3	0	3	3	46

1 Feb	Canada	19:2 (6:2,6:0,7:0)	Great Britain
2 Feb	Great Britain	4:3 (0:1,2:2,2:0)	Sweden

Bronze:
Great Britain

William Anderson
Lorne Carr-Harris
Colin Carruthers
Eric Carruthers
Guy Clarkson
Ross Cuthbert
Geoffrey Holmes
Hamilton Jukes
Edward Pitblado
Blane Sexton

== Speed skating ==
Men

Event	Athlete	Race	
Event	Athlete	Time	Rank
500 m	Fred Dix	56.4	23
500 m	Tom Sutton	1:00.8	25
500 m	Cyril Horn	1:04.4	27
5000 m	Albert Tebbit	11:01.0	20

All-round
Distances: 500m; 5000m; 1500m & 10,000m.

Athlete	Until distance 1			Until distance 2			Until distance 3			Total		
Athlete	Points	Score	rank	Points	Score	rank	Points	Score	rank	Points	Score	rank
Fred Dix	18.5	56.40	18	DNF								
Tom Sutton	20	60.80	20	DNF								
Cyril Horn	22	64.40	22	DNF								
