= Switzerland at the 1924 Winter Olympics =

- IOC code: SUI
- NOC: Swiss Olympic Association
- Website: www.swissolympic.ch (in German and French)

in Chamonix
- Competitors: 30 (men) in 7 sports
- Medals Ranked 4th: Gold 2 Silver 0 Bronze 1 Total 3

Winter Olympics appearances (overview)
- 1924; 1928; 1932; 1936; 1948; 1952; 1956; 1960; 1964; 1968; 1972; 1976; 1980; 1984; 1988; 1992; 1994; 1998; 2002; 2006; 2010; 2014; 2018; 2022; 2026

Switzerland competed at the 1924 Winter Olympics in Chamonix, France.

== Medalists ==
Medal	Name	Sport	Event
Gold	Alfred Neveu; Eduard Scherrer; Alfred Schläppi; Heinrich Schläppi	Bobsleigh	Four/five-man
Gold	Adolf Aufdenblatten; Alphonse Julen; Antoine Julen; Denis Vaucher	Military patrol	Men's event
Bronze	Georges Gautschi	Figure skating	Men's singles

== Bobsleigh ==
Sled	Athletes	Event	Run 1		Run 2		Run 3		Run 4		Total	
Sled	Athletes	Event	Time	Rank	Time	Rank	Time	Rank	Time	Rank	Time	Rank
SUI-1	Eduard Scherrer; Alfred Neveu; Alfred Schläppi; Heinrich Schläppi	Four/five-man	1:27.39	1	1:26.60	1	1:25.02	1	1:26.53	2	5:45.54	1st place, gold medalist(s)
SUI-2	Charles Stoffel; Alois Faigle; Anton Guldener; Edmond Laroche	Four/five-man	5:38.00	9	DNF							–

== Cross-country skiing ==
Men

Event	Athlete	Race	
Event	Athlete	Time	Rank
18 km	Alexandre Girard-Bille	1'41:43.4	26
18 km	Hans Eidenbenz	1'39:51.8	25
18 km	Xavier Affentranger	1'36:36.2	22
18 km	Peter Schmid	1'33:34.8	14
50 km	Alfred Aufdenblatten	DNF	–
50 km	Hans Herrmann	DNF	–
50 km	Simon Julen	DNF	–

== Figure skating ==
Men

Athlete	Event	CF	FS	Points	Places	Final rank
Georges Gautschi	Men's singles	3	4	319.07	23	3rd place, bronze medalist(s)

== Ice hockey ==
=== Group A ===
The top two teams (highlighted) advanced to the medal round.

Team	GP	W	L	GF	GA
Canada	3	3	0	85	0
Sweden	3	2	1	18	25
Czechoslovakia	3	1	2	14	41
Switzerland	3	0	3	2	53

28 Jan	Sweden	9:0 (3:0,3:0,3:0)	Switzerland
30 Jan	Canada	33:0 (8:0,11:0,14:0)	Switzerland
1 Feb	Czechoslovakia	11:2 (4:0,3:2,4:0)	Switzerland

—	Switzerland
	Fred Auckenthaler; Walter von Siebenthal; Edouard Filliol; Marius Jaccard; Ernest Jacquet; Bruno Leuzinger; Ernest Mottier; Paul Müller; René Savoie; Donald Unger; André Verdeil; Louis Dufour; Max Holzboer

== Military patrol ==
Athletes	Time	Shots on target	Final Time (-30s./hit)	Rank
Adolf Aufdenblatten; Alphonse Julen; Antoine Julen; Denis Vaucher	4'00:06	8	3'56:06	1st place, gold medalist(s)

== Nordic combined ==
Events:

- 18 km cross-country skiing
- normal hill ski jumping

The cross-country skiing part of this event was combined with the main medal event of cross-country skiing. Those results can be found above in this article in the cross-country skiing section. Some athletes (but not all) entered in both the cross-country skiing and Nordic combined event, their time on the 18 km was used for both events. One would expect that athletes competing at the Nordic combined event, would participate in the cross-country skiing event as well, as they would have the opportunity to win more than one medal. This was not always the case due to the maximum number of athletes (here: 4) could represent a country per event.

The ski jumping (normal hill) event was held separate from the main medal event of ski jumping, results can be found in the table below.

Athlete	Event	Ski Jumping				Cross-country			Total	
Athlete	Event	Distance 1	Distance 2	Total points	Rank	Time	Points	Rank	Points	Rank
Xavier Affentranger	Individual	33.0	34.0	13.375	16	1'36:36	9.000	14	11.188	17
Peter Schmid	Individual	34.5	33.0	14.062	14	1'33:34	10.375	9	12.219	11
Hans Eidenbenz	Individual	36.5	41.5	15.583	10	1'39:51	7.375	16	11.479	15
Alexandre Girard-Bille	Individual	38.0	41.0	16.708	5	1'41:43	6.500	17	11.604	14

== Ski jumping ==
Athlete	Event	Jump 1			Jump 2			
Athlete	Event	Distance	Points	Rank	Distance	Points	Total	Rank
Xavier Affentranger	Normal hill	fall	2.667	25	32.5	12.960	7.813	24
Peter Schmid	Normal hill	33.0	13.500	19	33.5	13.375	13.438	18
Hans Eidenbenz	Normal hill	42.0	16.460	11	fall	4.167	10.313	23
Alexandre Girard-Bille	Normal hill	40.5	16.710	8	41.5	16.877	16.793	8
