= Italy at the 1924 Winter Olympics =

- IOC code: ITA
- NOC: Italian National Olympic Committee
- Website: www.coni.it (in Italian)

in Chamonix
- Competitors: 23 (men) in 4 sports
- Flag bearer: Leonardo Bonzi
- Medals: Gold 0 Silver 0 Bronze 0 Total 0

Winter Olympics appearances (overview)
- 1924; 1928; 1932; 1936; 1948; 1952; 1956; 1960; 1964; 1968; 1972; 1976; 1980; 1984; 1988; 1992; 1994; 1998; 2002; 2006; 2010; 2014; 2018; 2022; 2026

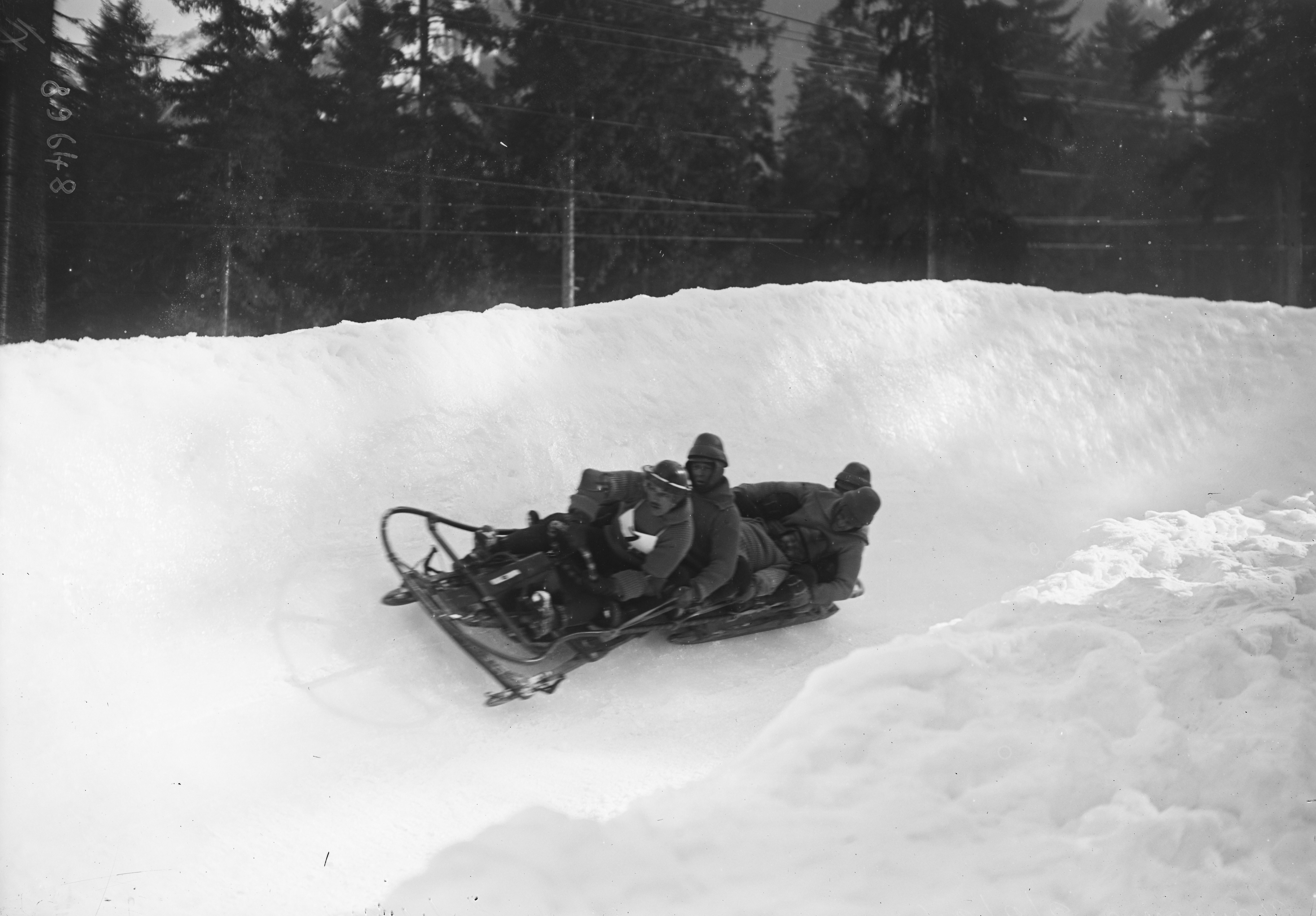
The bobsleigh of the Italian team

Italy competed at the 1924 Winter Olympics in Chamonix, France.

== Bobsleigh ==
Sled	Athletes	Event	Run 1		Run 2		Run 3		Run 4		Total	
Sled	Athletes	Event	Time	Rank	Time	Rank	Time	Rank	Time	Rank	Time	Rank
ITA-1	Lodovico Obexer; Massimo Fink; Paolo Herbert; Giuseppe Steiner; Aloise Trenker	Four/five-man	1:53.00	6	1:49.69	6	1:48.73	6	1:43.99	6	7:15.41	6
ITA-2	Luigi Tornielli di Borgolavezzaro; Adolfo Bocchi; Leonardo Bonzi; Alfredo Spasciani; Alberto Visconti	Four/five-man	4:08.44	7	DNF							–

== Cross-country skiing ==
Men

Event	Athlete	Race	
Event	Athlete	Time	Rank
18 km	Achille Bacher	1'36:03.8	21
18 km	Daniele Pellissier	1'33:45.2	15
18 km	Antonio Herin	1'33:06.4	13
18 km	Enrico Colli	1'26:32.4	12
50 km	Benigno Ferrera	4'45:39	13
50 km	Vincenzo Colli	4'31:34	11
50 km	Giuseppe Ghedina	4'27:48	10
50 km	Enrico Colli	4'10:50	9

== Military patrol ==
Athletes	Time	Shots on target	Final Time (-30s./hit)	Rank
Piero Dente; Albino Bich; Goffredo Lagger; Paolo Francia	DNF	–	–	–

== Ski jumping ==
Athlete	Event	Jump 1			Jump 2			
Athlete	Event	Distance	Points	Rank	Distance	Points	Total	Rank
Mario Cavalla	Normal hill	32.0	12.750	21	32.5	12.460	12.605	19
Luigi Faure	Normal hill	34.0	14.083	18	33.5	13.937	14.010	17
