= Belgium national bobsleigh team =

Belgium at the Winter Olympics, Bobsleigh
- IOC code: BEL
- Medals: Gold 0 Silver 1 Bronze 1 Total 2

The Belgian national bobsleigh team represents Belgium in international bobsledding competitions. Belgium first gained fame in bobsleighing during their debut at the first Winter Olympics in Chamonix in 1924, where a Belgian four-man bob acquired the bronze medal. The second and last Belgian bobsleigh medal at the Winter Olympics so far, also won during a four-man event, was a silver in St. Moritz in 1948.

After Belgian bobsleighs were absent during 58 years of Winter Olympics, a Belgian delegation of two female bobsleighers (Elfje Willemsen and Eva Willemarck) participated at the Vancouver 2010 edition. Shortly after, the Belgian bobsleigh selection with two female bobsleighers received the nickname Belgian Bullets, after the speed and shape of the vehicles. The Bullets also qualified for the 2014 Winter Olympics.

== Current ==
The team which participated at the 2014 Winter Olympics in Sochi is as follows:

Position	Teammate
Driver	Elfje Willemsen
Brakeman	Hanna Mariën
Reserve	Annelies Holthof
Manager	Janis Skrastins

== Olympic medals ==
Medal	Championship	Names	Event
Bronze	(France) 1924 Chamonix	Charles Mulder; René Mortiaux; Paul Van den Broeck; Bjarni Verniers; Henri Willems	4-man
Silver	(Switzerland) 1948 St. Moritz	Max Houben; Freddy Mansveld; Louis-Georges Niels; Jacques Mouvet	4-man

== See also ==
- Bobsleigh at the Winter Olympics
