= Nordic combined at the 1924 Winter Olympics =

Nordic combined at the I Olympic Winter Games
- Venue: Le Tremplin Olympique du Mont (ski jumping); Stade Olympique de Chamonix (cross-country skiing)
- Dates: 2–4 February 1924
- Competitors: 30 from 9 nations
- Winning Score: 37.812

Medalists
1st place, gold medalist(s)		Thorleif Haug	Norway
2nd place, silver medalist(s)		Thoralf Strømstad	Norway
3rd place, bronze medalist(s)		Johan Grøttumsbraaten	Norway

At the 1924 Winter Olympics one individual Nordic combined event was contested. It was held on Saturday, February 2, 1924 (cross-country skiing) and on Monday, February 4, 1924 (ski jumping). Unlike today the ski jump was the last event held. Both events were also individual medal events. The winner, Thorleif Haug was also the winner of both cross-country skiing races, and the podium was identical to that in the 50 km cross-country.

== Medalists ==
Gold	Silver	Bronze
Thorleif Haug; Norway	Thoralf Strømstad; Norway	Johan Grøttumsbråten; Norway

== Results ==
=== Final standings ===
Place	Competitor	Total
1	Thorleif Haug (NOR)	18.906
2	Thoralf Strømstad (NOR)	18.219
3	Johan Grøttumsbråten (NOR)	17.854
4	Harald Økern (NOR)	17.260
5	Axel-Herman Nilsson (SWE)	14.063
6	Josef Adolf (TCH)	13.720
7	Walter Buchberger (TCH)	13.625
8	Menotti Jakobsson (SWE)	12.823
9	Verner Eklöf (FIN)	12.583
10	Klébert Balmat (FRA)	12.333
11	Sigurd Overby (USA)	12.219
11	Peter Schmid (SUI)	12.219
13	Josef Bím (TCH)	12.083
14	Alexandre Girard-Bille (SUI)	11.604
15	Hans Eidenbenz (SUI)	11.438
16	Sulo Jääskeläinen (FIN)	11.365
17	Xaver Affentranger (SUI)	11.188
18	Gilbert Ravanel (FRA)	11.063
19	Andrzej Krzeptowski (POL)	9.531
20	Adrien "André" Vandelle (FRA)	8.167
21	Anders Haugen (USA)	5.750
22	John Carleton (USA)	5.104
—	Ragnar Omtvedt (USA)	DNF
—	Franciszek Bujak (POL)	DNF
—	Nils Lindh (SWE)	DNF
—	István Déván (HUN)	DNF
—	Aladár Háberl (HUN)	DNF
—	Béla Szepes (HUN)	DNF
—	Otakar Německý (TCH)	DNF
—	Martial Payot (FRA)	DNF

== Participating nations ==
A total of 30 Nordic combined skiers from nine nations competed at the Chamonix Games:

- Czechoslovakia (4)
- Finland (2)
- France (4)
- Hungary (3)
- Norway (4)
- Poland (2)
- Sweden (3)
- Switzerland (4)
- United States (4)
