= Schläppi =

Schläppi is a Swiss surname. Notable people with the surname include:

- Alfred Schläppi (1898–1981), Swiss bobsledder
- Heinrich Schläppi (1905–1958), Swiss bobsledder
