= 1924 Winter Olympics medal table =

1924 Winter Olympics medals
- Location: Chamonix, France

Highlights
- Most gold medals: Finland (4) and Norway (4)
- Most total medals: Norway (17)
- Medalling NOCs: 10

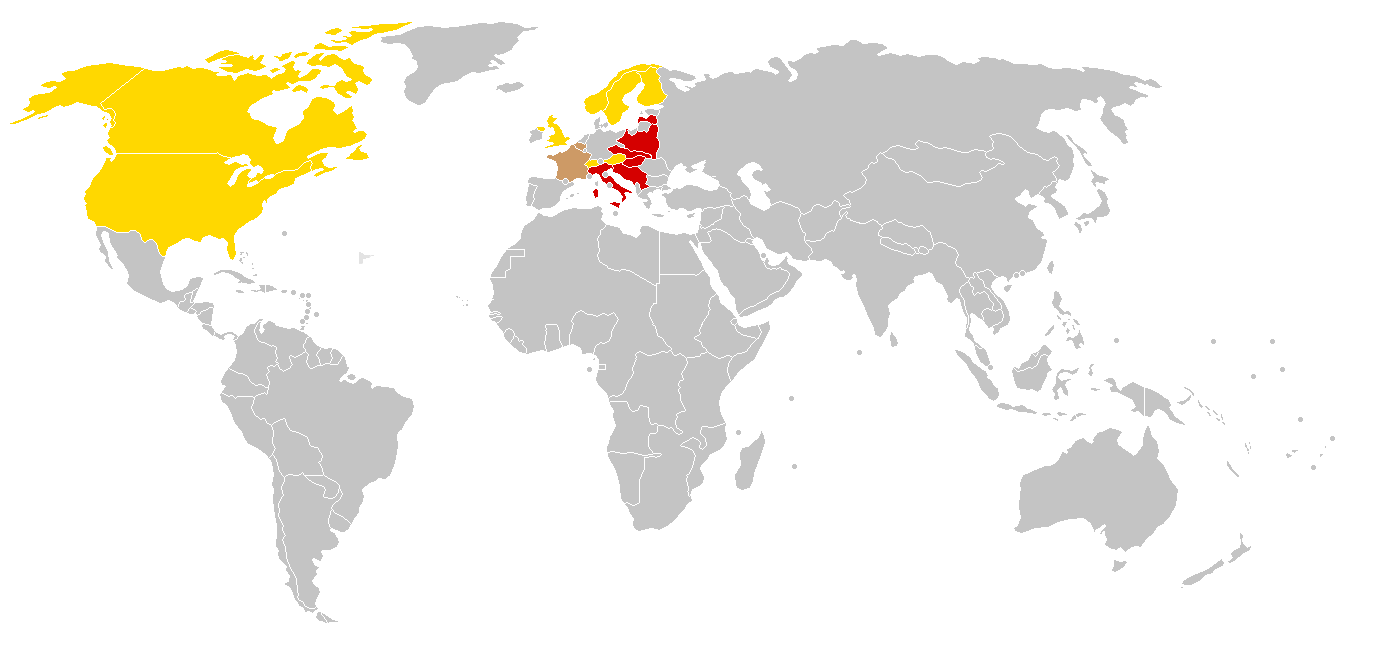
1924 Winter Olympic Games Medals map Legend: Gold represents countries that won at least one gold medal Silver represents countries that won at least one silver medal Bronze represents countries that won at least one bronze medal Red represents countries that did not win any medals Grey represents countries that did not participate

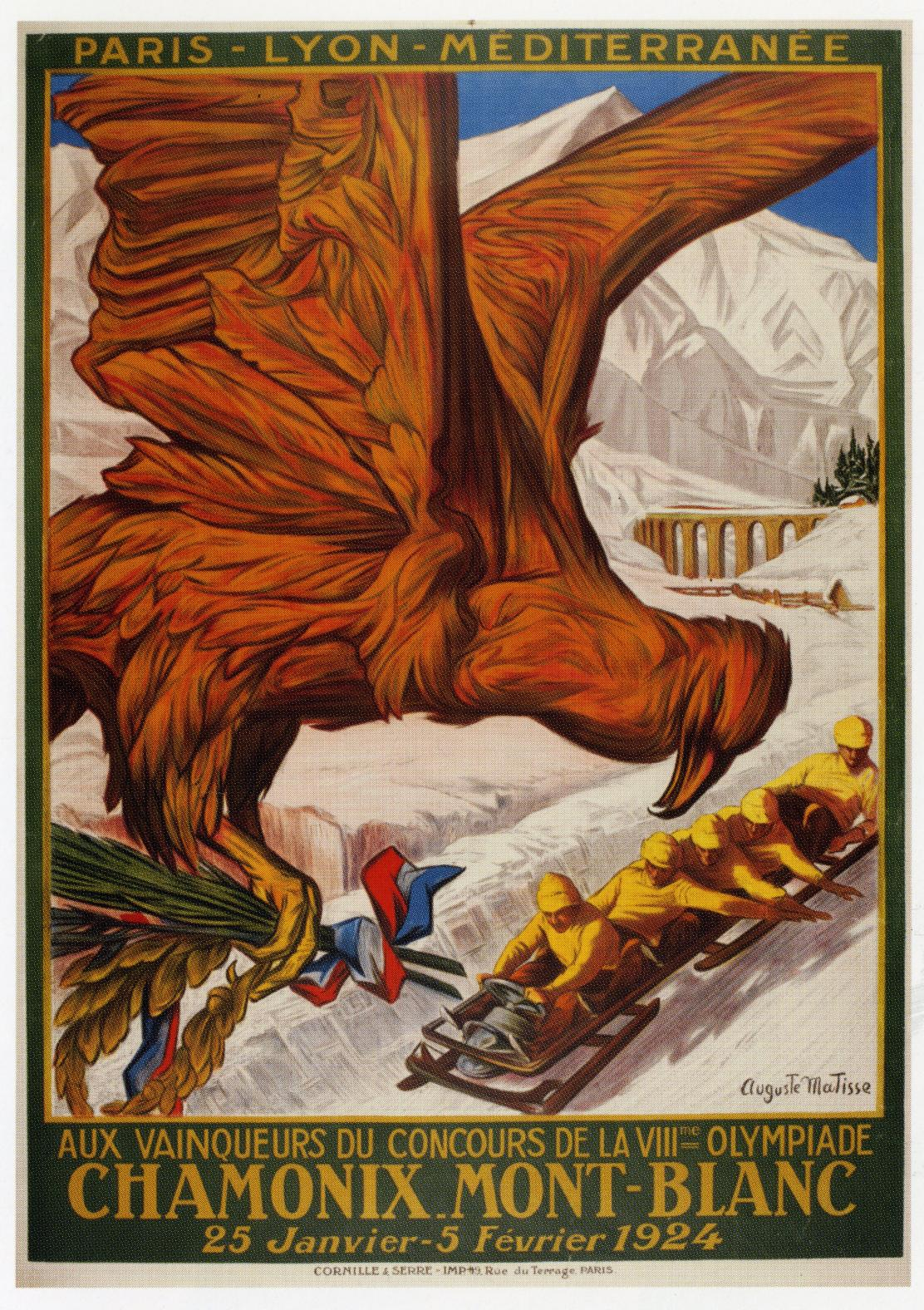
Publicity poster for the event

The 1924 Winter Olympics, officially known as the I Olympic Winter Games, and known at the time as Semaine Internationale des Sports d'Hiver ("International Winter Sports Week"), was a winter multi-sport event held in Chamonix, France, from 25 January to 5 February 1924. Norway topped the table, collecting seventeen medals in total, including four gold, three of which were won by Thorleif Haug in the Nordic combined and cross-country skiing events. Norway also achieved two podium sweeps, winning all three medals in both the 50 km cross-country skiing and the Nordic combined. This remained a record at the Winter Olympics until 2014. (Note: No country achieved more than two podium sweeps until the Netherlands in 2014, but the record was tied prior to that; by Norway themselves in 1928 and 1932, the Soviet Union in 1964, East Germany in 1972 and 1984, and Germany in 1998.)

When it was held, the games were not formally recognised as being the Olympics, but acknowledged that they were held under the "high patronage of the International Olympic Committee". Partly due to this, varying figures are reported for the number of participants. The International Olympic Committee (IOC) website suggests that 258 athletes from 16 nations participated in 16 events across 9 sports. In contrast, the Sports-Reference website lists 313 participants from 19 countries. Bill Mallon, a prominent Olympic Games historian, quotes a figure of 291 competitors in his Historical Dictionary of the Olympic Movement. Meanwhile, the official report for the 1924 Summer and Winter Olympics listed 293 athletes from 17 nations.

Finland placed second on the table, collecting four gold medals amongst a total of eleven. Clas Thunberg won five of their medals, achieving a medal in each of the speed skating events he took part in; collecting three gold medals, one silver and one bronze. Eight of the competing nations achieved at least one gold medal, with only Belgium and the hosts, France, medalling without winning a gold medal. One medal was reallocated in 1974; during the games, Thorleif Haug of Norway had been awarded the bronze medal in ski jumping, along with his three gold medals. A Norwegian historian discovered that there had been a scoring error, and an American, Anders Haugen, had actually finished in third place. As Haug had died in 1934, his daughter presented Haugen, aged 83, with his medal.

In the official report, the classification of nations is ranked not by medals, but rather by "points", which were awarded for each position from first to sixth; not exclusively for gold, silver and bronze. Due to this, Czechoslovakia were included in the table ahead of Belgium, due to two fourth-place finishes, one fifth and one sixth. Italy were also present, in twelfth, for their solitary sixth place.

== Medal table ==
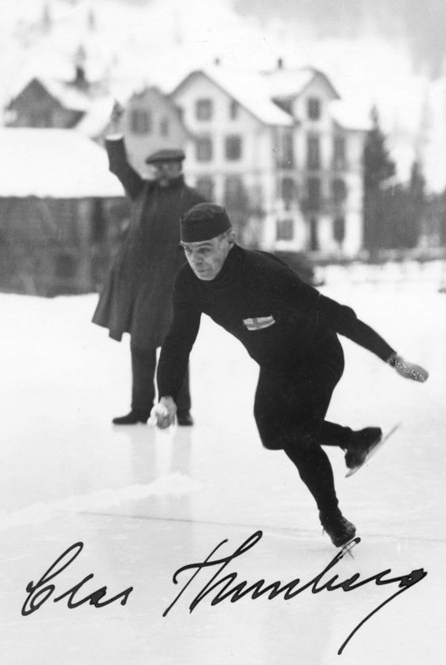
Clas Thunberg won five speed skating medals at the games for Finland.

The medal table is based on information provided by the IOC and is consistent with IOC convention in its published medal tables. The table uses the Olympic medal table sorting method. By default, the table is ordered by the number of gold medals the athletes from a nation have won, where a nation is an entity represented by a National Olympic Committee (NOC). The number of silver medals is taken into consideration next, and then the number of bronze medals. If teams are still tied, equal ranking is given and they are listed alphabetically by their IOC country code. Two bronze medals were awarded in the 500 metres speed skating event for the third place tie.

Pierre de Coubertin—founder of the IOC & father of the modern Olympics movement—personally awarded, in addition to the medals awarded in the sports competitions, 21 gold medals to members of the 1922 British Mount Everest Expedition including 12 Britons, 7 Indians, 1 Australian and 1 Nepalese. Only the gold medal from 1924 is assigned to the Winter Olympics by the IOC in its database to the Mixed team, while the medals from 1932 and 1936 are assigned to the Summer Olympics for the respective NOCs.

* Host nation (France)

1924 Winter Olympics medal table
Rank	NOC	Gold	Silver	Bronze	Total
1	Norway	4	7	6	17
2	Finland	4	4	3	11
3	Austria	2	1	0	3
4	Switzerland	2	0	1	3
5	United States	1	2	1	4
6	Great Britain	1	1	2	4
7	Sweden	1	1	0	2
8	Canada	1	0	0	1
8	Mixed team	1	0	0	1
10	France*	0	0	3	3
11	Belgium	0	0	1	1
Totals (11 entries)		17	16	17	50

== See also ==
- List of 1924 Winter Olympics medal winners
