= Ross Cuthbert =

Ross Cuthbert may refer to:

- Ross Cuthbert (politician) (1776–1861), Canadian writer, lawyer and politician
- Ross Cuthbert (ice hockey) (1892–1971), Canadian-born British ice hockey player
