= Gabriel Izard =

French bobsledder

Personal information
- Nationality: French
- Born: 28 September 1901
- Died: 21 October 1971 (aged 70)

Sport
- Sport: Bobsleigh

Gabriel Izard (28 September 1901 – 21 October 1971) was a French bobsledder. He competed in the four-man event at the 1924 Winter Olympics.
