= Émile Legrand =

French bobsledder

Personal information
- Nationality: French
- Born: 1897

Sport
- Sport: Bobsleigh

Émile Legrand (born 1897, date of death unknown) was a French bobsledder. He competed in the four-man event at the 1924 Winter Olympics.
