= Olaf Helset =

Norwegian military officer (1892–1960)

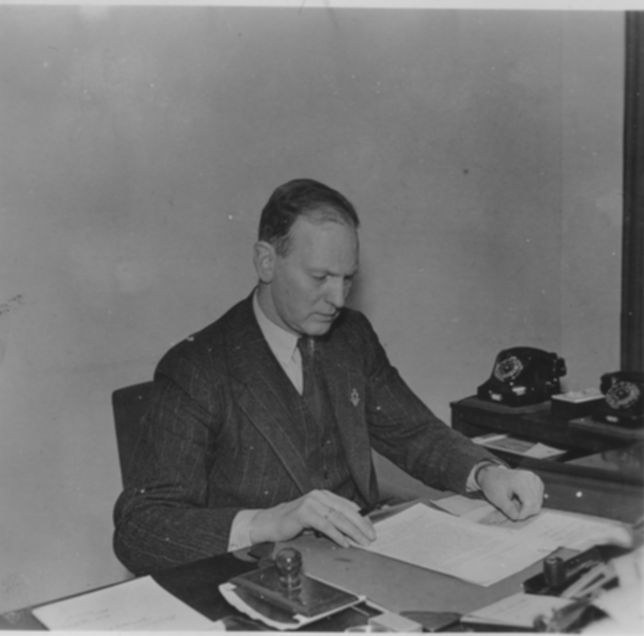
- Olaf Helset in 1945
- Born: 28 July 1892; Nannestad, Norway
- Died: 21 August 1960 (aged 68)
- Occupations: Military Officer; Sports Administrator
- Awards: War Cross with Sword; Finnish Freedom Cross in gold; British King's Medal for Courage in the Cause of Freedom; Commander with Star of the Order of St. Olav; Commander of the French Légion d'honneur; Commander of the Swedish Order of the Sword

Olaf Helset (28 July 1892 – 21 August 1960) was a Norwegian military officer with the rank of major general and a sports administrator. He played a central role in the early resistance during the German occupation of Norway, both civil and military resistance. He was later in command of the Norwegian police troops in exile in Sweden. After the war, he served as head of the Norwegian Army for two years.

== Personal life ==
Helset was born in Nannestad. The son of Peder Helset and Ingeborg Kristiane Skjegstad, he grew up in Romerike. He married Nini Eugenie Hansen in 1920.

== Early career ==
Helset graduated from the Norwegian Military Academy in 1915, from the State Gymnastics School in 1917 and from the Norwegian Military College in 1919.

He chaired the sports club IL i BUL in 1917, 1920 to 1922, 1923 to 1924, 1925–1926 and 1927.

== World War II ==
During the Norwegian Campaign in 1940 Helset was in command at the Battle of Midtskogen. As a sports leader he fronted the sports boycott against the Nazi authorities. He was also a leader in the military organization Milorg, the main Norwegian resistance movement during the German occupation of Norway. Helset was arrested in 1941, but eventually released from prison and fled to Sweden. There, he worked first as a refugee chief in 1943 to 1944 and then in 1944 1945 as head of the Norwegian police forces in Sweden.

For his war efforts, he was decorated with the Norwegian War Cross with Sword (1949), the Finnish Freedom Cross in gold, the British King's Medal for Courage in the Cause of Freedom and other foreign decorations.

== Later career ==
Helset served as head of the Norwegian Army from 1946 to 1948, when he resigned after a conflict with the government on defense policy. After his resignation he served as head of the district of Southern Norway, with the rank of Major General. He served as commander of the Fredriksten fortress from 1951 to 1953. He was a leader of the Norwegian Confederation of Sports from 1946 to 1948. In 1947 he was decorated Commander with Star of the Order of St. Olav. He was a Commander of the French Légion d'honneur and Commander of the Swedish Order of the Sword.

Sporting positions
Preceded by Nicolai Ramm Østgaard	Chairman of the Norwegian Ski Federation; 1930–1932	Succeeded by Gunnar Jahr
Preceded by Alfred Schläppi, Heinrich Schläppi	President of Organizing Committee for Winter Olympic Games (with Haakon VII of Norway, Princess Astrid of Norway & House of Glücksburg ) 1952	Succeeded by Enrico Colli
