= Hanna Mariën =

Belgian sprinter

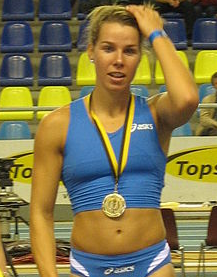
- Mariën in 2008

Personal information
- Born: 16 May 1982 (age 44) Herentals, Antwerp, Belgium
- Height: 169 cm (5 ft 7 in)
- Weight: 65 kg (143 lb)

Sport
- Sport: Athletics
- Event: Sprint
- Club: AC Waasland, Sint-Niklaas

Achievements and titles
- Personal best: 200 m - (2006)
Medal record
Representing Belgium
Olympic Games
Gold medal – first place	2008 Beijing	4 × 100 m relay
World Championships
Bronze medal – third place	2007 Osaka	4 × 100 m relay
Summer Universiade
Bronze medal – third place	2007 Bangkok	200 m

Hanna Emilie Mariën (born 16 May 1982) is a Belgian retired athlete and bobsledder. As a sprinter, Mariën specialized in the 200 metres and won gold in the 4 × 100 m relay at the 2008 Beijing Olympics. Mariën later became a bobsleigher, competing for Belgium at the 2014 Winter Olympics.

== Athletics ==
Mariën reached the semi-final at the 2006 European Championships and won the bronze medal at the 2007 Summer Universiade. At the 2007 World Championships she won a bronze medal in the 4 × 100 m relay, together with teammates Olivia Borlée, Élodie Ouédraogo and Kim Gevaert. With 42.75 seconds the team set a new Belgian record.

At the 2008 Summer Olympics Mariën competed in the 4 × 100 m relay, together with Gevaert, Borlée and Ouédraogo. In their first round heat they placed first in front of Great Britain, Brazil and Nigeria. Their time of 42.92 seconds was the third time overall out of sixteen participating nations. With this result they qualified for the final in which they sprinted to a time of 42.54 seconds and the second place, 0.23 seconds behind Russia. In 2016, after Yuliya Chermoshanskaya's re-tested samples revealed two illegal substances, Russia was disqualified promoting Belgium to first place. She and her teammates were awarded their gold medals after eight years, on September 10, 2016.

== Bobsleighing ==
After retiring from athletics in 2012, Mariën turned to bobsleighing. With the national bobsleigh team, she participated at the 2014 Winter Olympics, where she and Elfje Willemsen ended sixth in the two woman bob.

== Honours ==
In 2026, the Chemin Hanna Mariën/Hanna Mariënweg in the Heysel neighbourhood of Brussels, Belgium, was named in her honour.

Olympic Games
Preceded by Kevin Van der Perren	Flagbearer for Belgium; Sochi 2014	Succeeded by Seppe Smits
