= Alexander Harris (writer) =

Australian writer (1805–1874)

- Born: 7 February 1805
- Died: 1 February 1874 (aged 68)
- Occupations: soldier, teacher, novelist

Alexander Harris (7 February 1805 – 1 February 1874) was a soldier, teacher and author known for his early accounts of convict life in Australia.

He arrived in Sydney, Australia, in 1825 and returned to London, England, in 1841.

He had numerous jobs including a soldier, clerk, a tutor and a timber-getter. He travelled mostly around the Hunter Valley, the Shoalhaven, Illawarra, and Bathurst in New South Wales. In 1851 he emigrated to the United States. He emigrated to Berlin, Ontario, on the outbreak of the U.S. civil war in 1861 and died in Copetown, Ontario, on 1 February 1874.

== Family ==
Alexander Harris married Ursula Carr. They had several children including a son, Robert Carr Harris, who was born in 1843. Robert Carr-Harris, a professor of engineering at the Royal Military College of Canada and his wife Ellen Jane Fitton Carr-Harris had several children: Mary Alexandria (b. 1 Mar 1875); Ferguson (b. 25 Dec 1877); Captain Ernest Dale (b. 14 Feb 1878); #555 Robert R. (civil engineer b. April 1881); Athol (civil engineer b. Sep 1883); Grant (b. Jun 1898); Guy (b. Jun 1898), #1325 Lorne Howland (b. 1899). All of Robert Carr Harris's sons and two of his nephews were cadets at the Royal Military College of Canada in Kingston, Ontario. Alexander Harris's grandson Grant Carr-Harris wrote the biography 'The secrets of Alexander Harris' in 1961. Grant Carr-Harris also wrote 'Carr-Harris – history & genealogy' (Toronto 1966). Lorne Carr-Harris was the goalie on the British ice hockey team which won the bronze medal at the 1924 Winter Olympics in Chemoix, France.

Captain Ernest Dale Carr-Harris R.E., who died on 3 November 1914 at 36 years of age, was commemorated on page 565 of the First World War Book of Remembrance.

== Bibliography ==
- Settlers and Convicts: Recollections of sixteen years labour in the Australian backwoods (London, 1847)
- Testimony to the Truth: or the Autobiography of an Atheist (1848)
- The Emigrant Family: or the Story of an Australian Settler (Smith, Elder and Co, 1849)
- A Guide to Port Stephens in New South Wales, the colony of the Australian Agricultural Company (1849)
- Religio Christi (1858)
- ' 'Alexander Harris: A Mystery No More' ' (Lorraine Neate, 2000)
- ' 'The Real Alexander Harris: a study in guessing, prejudice and detection' ' (Joseph Davis, 2011)
- ' 'The Early Life of Alexander Harris (author of Settlers & Convicts) as recorded in the Saturday Evening Post between March and October 1858 (Joseph Davis, 2020)
- ' 'The Unexpurgated Version of the time Alexander Harris (author of Settlers and Convicts) spent as a Clerk in Illawarra until absconding from his position in late 1828' (Joseph Davis, 2020)
