= Elfje Willemsen =

Belgian bobsledder

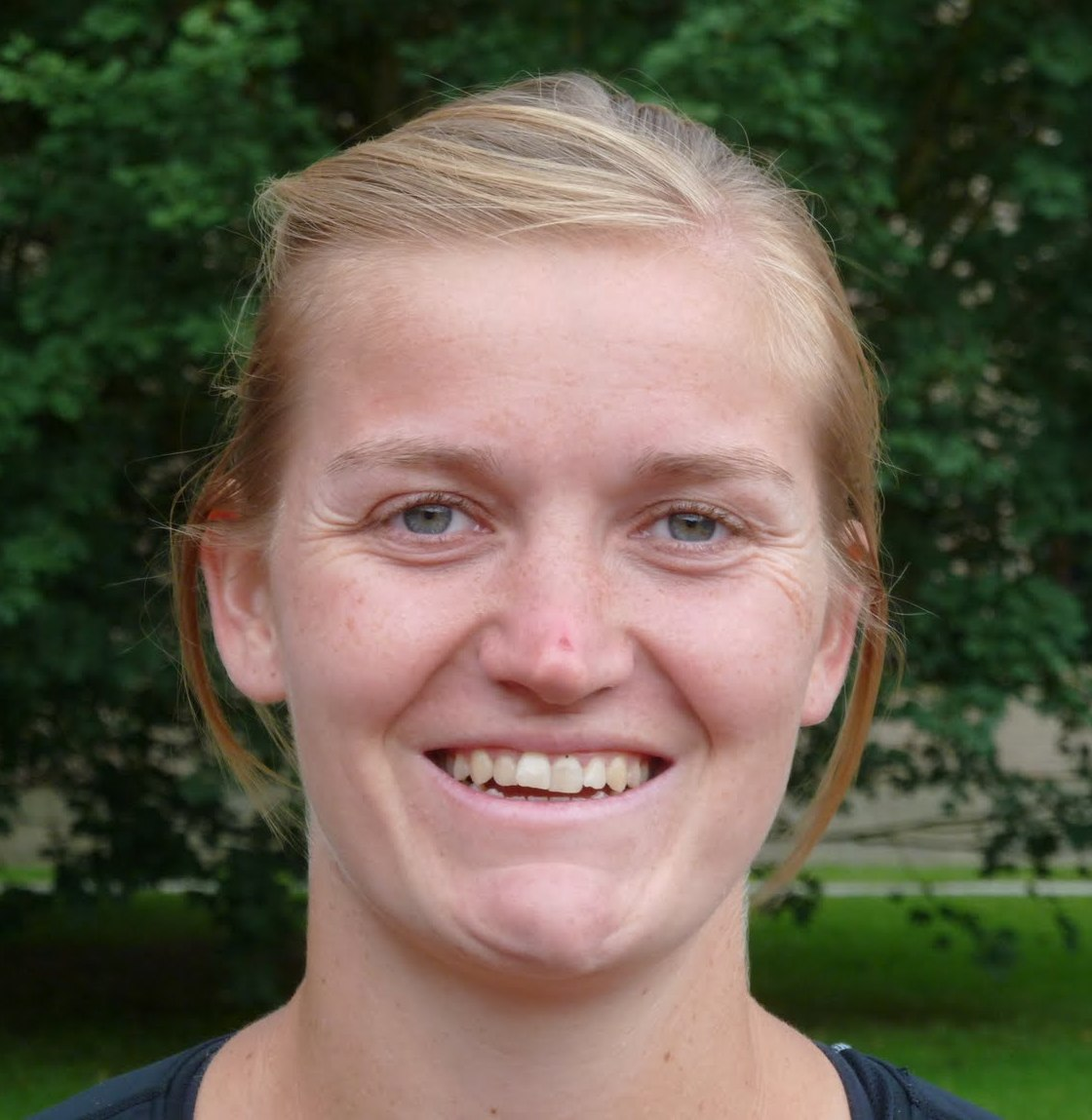
- Elfje Willemsen

Personal information
- Born: 11 January 1985 (age 41) Turnhout, Belgium

Sport
- Country: Belgium
- Sport: Bobsleigh
Medal record
European Championships
Silver medal – second place	2016 St. Moritz	Two-woman

Elfje Willemsen (born 11 January 1985 in Turnhout) is a Belgian bobsledder who has competed since 2007.

== Bobsledding career ==
Willemsen finished 18th in the two-woman event at the FIBT World Championships 2009 in Lake Placid, New York.

She qualified with the national bobsleigh team for the 2010 Winter Olympics. Together with Eva Willemarck she reached 14th place in the Two-woman bob competition.

In 2014, she participated at the 2014 Winter Olympics, where she and Hanna Mariën ended sixth in the two woman bob.

== Other athletics ==
Before her career as bobsledder, Willemsen competed as a javelin thrower.
