= Fernand Legrand =

French bobsledder

Personal information
- Nationality: French
- Born: 1898

Sport
- Sport: Bobsleigh

Fernand Legrand (born 1898, date of death unknown) was a French bobsledder. He competed in the four-man event at the 1924 Winter Olympics.
