= Alexander Richardson (British Army officer) =

British Army officer and bobsledder

Major-General Alexander Richardson CB DSO
- Born: 11 May 1887; Gerrards Cross, Buckinghamshire, England
- Died: 22 July 1964 (aged 77)
- Military career
- Allegiance: United Kingdom
- Branch: British Army
- Service years: 1905–1931; 1938–1945
- Rank: Major-General
- Commands: 26th Armoured Brigade (1940–41); 84th Anti-Aircraft Brigade (1938–40); 4th Battalion, Royal Tank Corps (1930–31)
- Conflicts: First World War; Second World War
- Awards: Companion of the Order of the Bath; Distinguished Service Order; Mentioned in Despatches

Olympic medal record

Bobsleigh
Silver medal – second place	1924 Chamonix	Four-man

Major-General Alexander Whitmore Colquhoun Richardson, CB, DSO (11 May 1887 – 22 July 1964) was a senior British Army officer during the Second World War and bobsledder who competed at the 1924 Winter Olympics in Chamonix.

Richardson was born at Gerrards Cross, Buckinghamshire. He served in the First World War in the Bedfordshire Regiment, reaching the rank of major and was awarded the Distinguished Service Order.

Richardson was a member of the four-man bobsled team with Ralph Broome, Thomas Arnold, and Rodney Soher, who won a silver medal in the 1924 Winter Olympics.

From 1930 until his retirement in 1931, Richardson was commanding officer of the 4th Battalion, Royal Tank Corps. He was recalled to service in 1938 and became commanding officer of the 84th Anti-Aircraft Brigade. From 1940 to 1941, he was commanding officer of the 26th Armoured Brigade and then became Director-General Armoured Fighting Vehicles at the War Office. He became Brigadier General Staff of the Second Army in 1942 and, in 1943, was appointed chief of staff of the 18th Army Group in Tunisia and then chief of staff of the 15th Army Group in Italy. He retired in 1945.

Richardson's son Guy Richardson won a silver medal rowing at the 1948 Summer Olympics. Another son Major James Alexander Colquhoun Richardson of 6th Royal Tank Regiment, died 10 July 1942, during First Battle of El Alamein, and is buried at El Alamein cemetery
