= Bobsleigh at the 1924 Winter Olympics =

Bobsleigh at the I Olympic Winter Games
- Venue: Chamonix, France
- Dates: 2–3 February, 1924
- Competitors: 39 from 5 nations

At the 1924 Winter Olympics, only one bobsleigh event was contested, the four man event. However, rules at the time also allowed a fifth sledder to compete. The event was held on Saturday and Sunday, 2 and 3 February 1924.

== Medalists ==
Gold	Silver	Bronze
Switzerland; Switzerland I Alfred Neveu; Eduard Scherrer; Alfred Schläppi; Heinrich Schläppi	Great Britain; Great Britain II; Thomas Arnold; Ralph Broome; Alexander Richardson; Rodney Soher	Belgium; Belgium I Charles Mulder; René Mortiaux; Paul Van den Broeck; Victor Verschueren; Henri Willems

== Results ==
Place	Team	Bobsledders	Run 1	Run 2	Run 3	Run 4	Total
1	Switzerland I (SUI)	Eduard Scherrer, Alfred Neveu, Alfred Schläppi, and Heinrich Schläppi	1:27.39	1:26.60	1:25.02	1:26.53	5:45.54
2	Great Britain II (GBR)	Ralph Broome, Thomas Arnold, Alexander Richardson, and Rodney Soher	1:28.73	1:28.67	1:25.76	1:25.67	5:48.83
3	Belgium I (BEL)	Charles Mulder, René Mortiaux, Paul Van den Broeck, Victor Verschueren, and Henri Willems	1:29.89	1:34.22	1:29.98	1:28.20	6:02.29
4	France II (FRA)	Antony Berg, Henri Aldebert, Georges André, and Jean de Suarez d'Aulan	1:39.35	1:34.99	1:36.68	1:31.93	6:22.95
5	Great Britain I (GBR)	William Horton, Archibald Crabbe, Gerard Fairlie, and George Pim	1:42.33	1:41.28	1:38.58	1:38.52	6:40.71
6	Italy I (ITA)	Lodovico Obexer, Massimo Fink, Paolo Herbert, Giuseppe Steiner, and Aloise Trenker	1:53.00	1:49.69	1:48.73	1:43.99	7:15.41
–	France I (FRA)	Émile Legrand, Gabriel Izard, Jacques Jany, and Fernand Legrand	4:29.01	–	2:00.79	1:56.58	–
–	Italy II (ITA)	Luigi Tornielli di Borgolavezzaro, Adolfo Bocchi, Leonardo Bonzi, Alfredo Spasciani, and Alberto Visconti	4:08.44	–	–	–	–
–	Switzerland II (SUI)	Charles Stoffel, Alois Faigle, Anton Guldener, and Edmond Laroche	5:38.00	–	–	–	–

== Participating nations ==
A total of 39 bobsledders from five nations competed at the Chamonix Games:

- Belgium (5)
- France (8)
- Great Britain (8)
- Italy (10)
- Switzerland (8)

== Medal table ==
Rank	Nation	Gold	Silver	Bronze	Total
1	Switzerland	1	0	0	1
2	Great Britain	0	1	0	1
3	Belgium	0	0	1	1
Totals (3 entries)		1	1	1	3
