= Antony Berg =

French bobsledder

Personal information
- Nationality: French
- Born: 8 August 1880 Paris, France
- Died: 18 April 1948 (aged 67) Paris, France

Sport
- Sport: Bobsleigh

Antony Eugène Berg (8 August 1880 – 18 April 1948) was a French bobsledder. He competed in the four-man event at the 1924 Winter Olympics. Berg earned a Military Cross for fighting in World War I, and in 1928, he became an Officier of the Legion of Honour.
