= Henri Aldebert =

French bobsledder

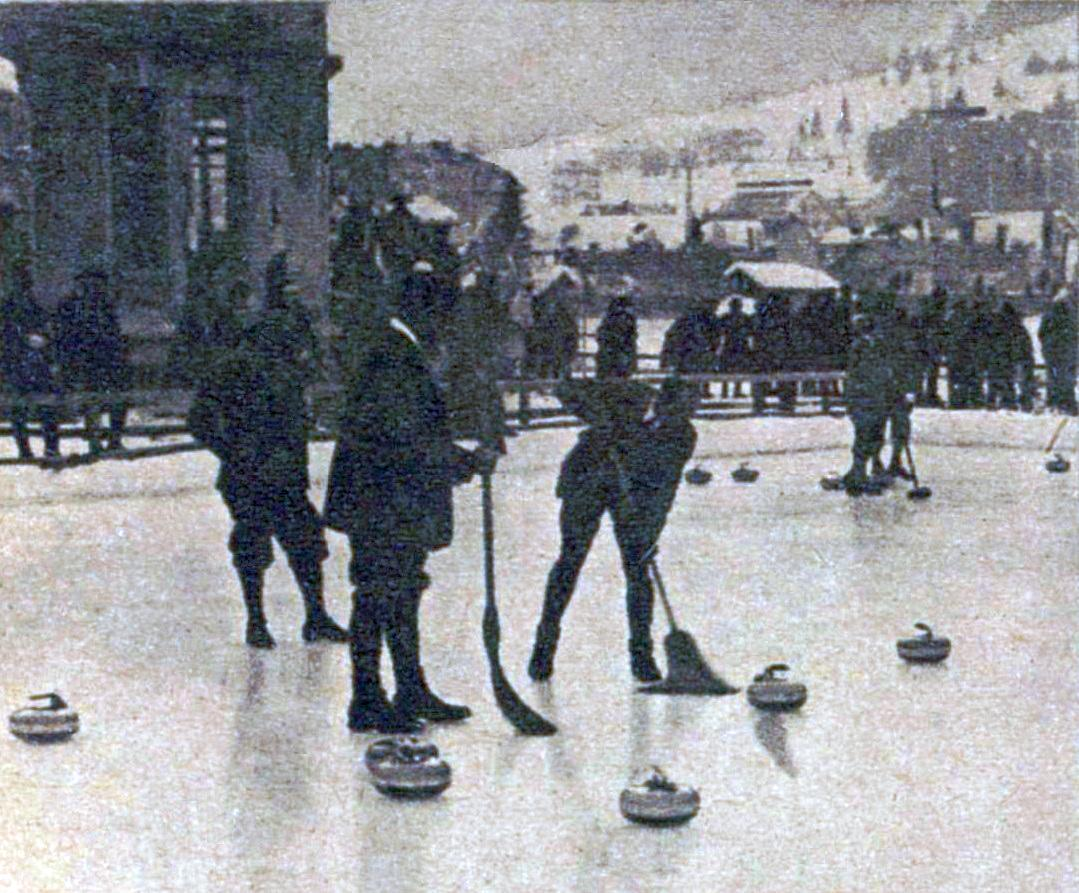
- Sweden-France curling meeting (Chamonix Olympics 1924)

Personal information
- Born: 8 August 1880 Paris, France
- Died: 24 April 1961 (aged 80) Paris, France

Sport
- Sport: Bobsleigh

Henri Eugène Aldebert (8 August 1880 – 24 April 1961) was a French bobsledder. He competed in the four-man event at the 1924 Winter Olympics.
