= Luigi Tornielli di Borgolavezzaro =

Italian bobsledder

Personal information
- Nationality: Italian
- Born: 1889
- Died: Unknown

Sport
- Sport: Bobsleigh

Luigi Tornielli di Borgolavezzaro (born 1889, date of death unknown) was an Italian bobsledder. He competed in the four-man event at the 1924 Winter Olympics. He was the president of the Italian Ice Sports Federation from 1927 to 1933.
