= William Horton (bobsleigh) =

British bobsledder

Personal information
- Nationality: British
- Born: 24 August 1897 Paris, France
- Died: 13 June 1974 (aged 76) Westminster, England

Sport
- Sport: Bobsleigh

William Gray Horton (24 August 1897 – 13 June 1974) was a British bobsledder. He competed in the four-man event at the 1924 Winter Olympics.
