= Adolfo Bocchi =

Italian bobsledder (1892–?)

Personal information
- Nationality: Italian
- Born: 1892
- Died: Unknown

Sport
- Sport: Bobsleigh

Adolfo Bocchi (born 1892, date of death unknown) was an Italian bobsledder. He competed in the four-man event at the 1924 Winter Olympics.
