= Paolo Herbert =

Italian bobsledder

Personal information
- Nationality: Italian
- Born: 1895

Sport
- Sport: Bobsleigh

Paolo Herbert (born 1895, date of death unknown) was an Italian bobsledder. He competed in the four-man event at the 1924 Winter Olympics.
