= Markus Zimmermann =

German bobsledder (born 1964)

Personal information
- Nationality: German
- Born: 4 September 1964 (age 62) Berchtesgaden, Bavaria, West Germany
- Height: 1.91 m (6 ft 3 in)
- Weight: 105 kg (231 lb; 16.5 st)

Sport
- Country: Germany
- Sport: Bobsleigh
- Events: 4-man, 2-man
- Coached by: (Germany) Raimund Bethge
- Retired: 2004

Achievements and titles
- Personal best: 1st place, gold medalist(s) 2nd place, silver medalist(s) 3rd place, bronze medalist(s)
Medal record
Men's Bobsleigh
Representing Germany
Olympic Games
Gold medal – first place	1998 Nagano	Four-man
Gold medal – first place	2002 Salt Lake City	Two-man
Silver medal – second place	1992 Albertville	Two-man
Bronze medal – third place	1998 Nagano	Two-man
World Championships
Gold medal – first place	1991 Altenberg	Two-man
Gold medal – first place	1996 Calgary	Two-man
Gold medal – first place	1996 Calgary	Four-man
Gold medal – first place	2000 Altenberg	Two-man
Gold medal – first place	2001 St. Moritz	Four-man
Silver medal – second place	1999 Cortina d'Ampezzo	Two-man
Silver medal – second place	2000 Altenberg	Four-man
Silver medal – second place	2004 Königssee	Two-man

Markus Zimmermann (born 4 September 1964) is a German former bobsledder who competed from 1984 to 2004. Competing in four Winter Olympics, he won four medals with two golds (Two-man: 2002, Four-man: 1998), one silver (Two-man: 1992), and one bronze (Two-man: 1998). He was born at Berchtesgaden, in southern Bavaria.

Zimmerman also won eight medals at the FIBT World Championships with five golds (Two-man: 1991, 1996, 2000; Four-man: 1996, 2001) and three silvers (Two-man: 1999, 2004; Four-man: 2000).
