= Edmond Laroche =

Swiss bobsledder

Personal information
- Nationality: Swiss
- Born: 1896

Sport
- Sport: Bobsleigh

Edmond Laroche (born 1896, date of death unknown) was a Swiss bobsledder. He competed in the four-man event at the 1924 Winter Olympics.
