= Xaver Affentranger =

Swiss skier (1897–1971)

Medal record

Men's Nordic combined

World Championships
Bronze medal – third place	1925 Johannisbad	Individual

Xaver Affentranger (1 December 1897 – 9 January 1971) was a Swiss cross-country skier, Nordic combined skier, and ski jumper who competed in the 1920s.

At the 1924 Winter Olympics he finished 17th in the Nordic combined event, 22nd in the 18 km cross-country competition, and 24th in the ski jumping event.

He won a bronze medal in the Nordic combined at the 1925 FIS Nordic World Ski Championships in Johannisbad.
