= Archibald Crabbe =

British bobsledder

Personal information
- Born: 7 March 1903 Edinburgh, Scotland
- Died: 12 July 1981 (aged 78) Penn, Buckinghamshire, England

Sport
- Sport: Bobsleigh

Archibald Douglas Brodie Crabbe (7 March 1903 – 12 July 1981) was a British bobsledder. He competed in the four-man event at the 1924 Winter Olympics. Crabbe was awarded with the OBE in 1945.
