= Klébert Balmat =

French ski jumper (1896–1961)

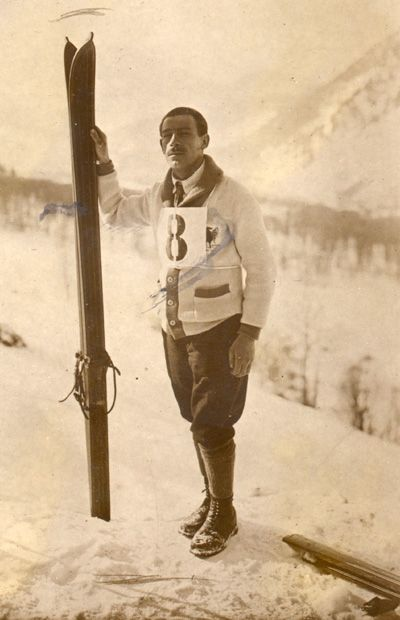

Personal information
- Nationality: French
- Born: 22 June 1896
- Died: 2 July 1961 (aged 65)

Sport
- Sport: Ski jumping

Klébert Balmat (22 June 1896 – 2 July 1961) was a French skier. He competed at the 1924 Winter Olympics and the 1928 Winter Olympics.
