= Giuseppe Steiner (bobsleigh) =

Italian bobsledder

Personal information
- Nationality: Italian
- Born: 1893
- Died: Unknown

Sport
- Sport: Bobsleigh

Giuseppe Steiner (born 1893, date of death unknown) was an Italian bobsledder. He competed in the four-man event at the 1924 Winter Olympics.
