= Alois Faigle =

Swiss bobsledder

Personal information
- Nationality: Swiss
- Born: 1898

Sport
- Sport: Bobsleigh

Alois Faigle (born 1898, date of death unknown) was a Swiss bobsledder. He competed in the four-man event at the 1924 Winter Olympics.
