= Alberto Visconti =

Italian bobsledder

Personal information
- Nationality: Italian
- Born: 1901

Sport
- Sport: Bobsleigh

Alberto Visconti (born 1901, date of death unknown) was an Italian bobsledder. He competed in the four-man event at the 1924 Winter Olympics.
