= Massimo Fink =

Italian bobsledder (1896–1956)

Personal information
- Nationality: Italian
- Born: 23 November 1896 Prati
- Died: 19 March 1956 (aged 59) Brixen

Sport
- Sport: Bobsleigh

Massimo Paul Fink (23 November 1896 – 19 March 1956) was an Italian bobsledder. He competed in the four-man event at the 1924 Winter Olympics.
