= Charles Stoffel =

Swiss sportsman (1893–1970)

Personal information
- Nationality: Swiss
- Born: 5 April 1893; St. Gallen, Switzerland
- Died: 30 July 1970 (aged 77); Berg, Switzerland

Sport
- Sport: Bobsleigh

Charles Stoffel (5 April 1893 – 30 July 1970) was a Swiss sportsman. He competed in the four-man bobsleigh event at the 1924 Winter Olympics and 1928 Winter Olympics. He also competed in the equestrian events at the 1924 Summer Olympics and the 1928 Summer Olympics.

== See also ==
- List of athletes who competed in both the Summer and Winter Olympic games
