= Alexandre Girard-Bille =

Swiss skier (1899–1961)

Alexandre Girard-Bille (1899–1961) was a Swiss skier. He competed at the 1924 Winter Olympics in Chamonix, where he placed eighth in ski jumping. He also competed in Nordic combined and 18 km cross-country skiing. Girard-Bille’s best performance was a top-10 in the ski jump where he finished in eighth place. Girard-Bille also finished in 14th place in the Nordic combined and in 26th place in the 18 kilometres cross-country.
