= Edward Pitblado =

British Canadian ice hockey player

- Born: 23 February 1896; Winnipeg, Manitoba, Canada
- Died: 2 December 1977 (aged 81); Winnipeg, Manitoba, Canada
- Education: University of Manitoba; University of Oxford
- Father: Isaac Pitblado
Ice hockey career
- Played for: British Olympic team (1924)
- National team: United Kingdom
Medal record
Men's Ice hockey
Bronze medal – third place	1924 Chamonix	Team competition

Edward Bruce Pitblado (23 February 1896 – 2 December 1977) was a British-Canadian ice hockey player who competed in the 1924 Winter Olympics for Great Britain.

== Biography ==
Born in Winnipeg, Manitoba, Pitblado graduated from the University of Manitoba in 1920. His father, prominent lawyer Isaac Pitblado, was the chairman of the board of governors at the university from 1917 to 1924, and also was co-prosecutor of the seditious conspirators in the Winnipeg General Strike.

After working briefly for his father's law firm, Pitblado went to the University of Oxford in 1922 on a Rhodes Scholarship. After being part of the 1924 British ice hockey team, he returned to Manitoba and received a law degree from the University of Manitoba in 1926.

Pitblado had a long and distinguished legal career, serving as president of the Law Society of Manitoba (1965-6). He was one of the incorporators of the University of Manitoba Alumni Association and served as president from 1929 to 1931. He was president of the Manitoba Fish and Game Association in 1935, and helped found the Canadian branch of Ducks Unlimited, serving as secretary of the organization from 1938 to 1974.

In 1928, he married Esther Jonsson, daughter of Reverend B. B. Jonsson. They had two children: James Pitblado and Janice Pitblado. He died at Winnipeg on 2 December 1977 and was buried in Elmwood Cemetery.
