= Victor Verschueren =

Belgian bobsledder and ice hockey player

- Born: 19 April 1893 Belgium
- Position: Goaltender
- National team: Belgium
- Playing career: 1922–1925

Olympic medal record

Bobsleigh
Bronze medal – third place	1924 Chamonix	Four-man

Victor Abel Verschueren (born 19 April 1893, date of death unknown) was a Belgian bobsledder and ice hockey player who competed during the early 1920s.

At the 1924 Winter Olympics in Chamonix, he won a bronze medal in the four-man bobsleigh event. He was also a member of the Belgian ice hockey team, which was eliminated in the first round of the 1924 Olympic tournament.
