= Geoffrey Holmes =

British ice hockey player

- Born: 19 February 1894; Toronto, Ontario, Canada
- Died: 7 May 1964 (aged 70); Woking, Surrey, Great Britain
Ice hockey career
- Played for: British Army Team "C" (1921-1922)
- National team: United Kingdom
Medal record
Men's Ice hockey
Bronze medal – third place	1924 Chamonix	Team competition
- Military career
- Allegiance: United Kingdom
- Branch: Royal Field Artillery
- Conflicts: World War I
- Awards: Military Cross

Geoffrey Holmes (Note: His name is listed in some sources as George Holmes) (19 February 1894, Toronto– 7 May 1964, Woking) was a British ice hockey player who competed in the 1924 Winter Olympics. He was a member of the British ice hockey team, which won the bronze medal.

Holmes attended the Royal Military College of Canada, graduating after taking a break to serve in the British Army in World War I. He returned to England, where he captained the Army's ice hockey team. He went on to become a pioneer missionary in East Africa, running an Anglican mission in Rwanda for several years. He was later ordained as a vicar. He was awarded the Military Cross for his service in 1918.
