= William Anderson (ice hockey) =

British ice hockey player

- Born: 1 April 1901 Nantwich, England, U.K.
- Died: 23 February 1983 (aged 81)
- Position: Goaltender
- National team: Great Britain
- Playing career: 1921–1924

Olympic medal record

Men's Ice hockey
| Bronze medal – third place | 1924 Chamonix | Team competition |

William Harding Anderson (1 April 1901 – 23 February 1983) was a British ice hockey player who competed in the 1924 Winter Olympics. He was a member of the British ice hockey team, which won the bronze medal.

He was born in Nantwich, Cheshire, England in 1901. His father, William Anderson, set up 'Hall and Anderson' in Calcutta (now called Kolkata) along with his partner, P.N. Hall. This was one of the first department stores in India. His mother, Elizabeth Harding (originally from Nantwich), was a dressmaker there. They were married in 1892 in India, but came back to England briefly for Elizabeth to give birth before their return to India.

William was a rarity on the 1924 Great Britain ice hockey team in that he was born and raised in England. A student at Caius College, he was captain of the Cambridge University team and divided his playing time between the roles of defenseman and goaltender. Great Britain could not raise a team for the 1924 European Championship and Anderson's international career ended after the brief appearance at Chamonix.

In 1931 he married Mabel Funston, an actress, and lived in Birkenhead, Merseyside until his death in 1983. He and Mabel did not have children (she was 15 years older than him).
