= Peter Schmid (skier) =

Peter Schmid (born 1898) was a Swiss skier. He competed at the 1924 Winter Olympics in Chamonix, where he placed 11th in Nordic combined, 14th in 18 km cross-country, and 18th in ski jumping.
