= Hamilton Jukes =

Canadian-British ice hockey player

- Born: 28 May 1895; Winnipeg, Manitoba, Canada
- Died: 8 January 1951 (aged 55); San Diego, California, USA
- Spouses: Dilys Gwendolyn Rees, Margaret Turnbull
- Children: 7
Ice hockey career
- National team: United Kingdom
Medal record
Men's Ice hockey
Bronze medal – third place	1924 Chamonix	Team competition
- Military career
- Allegiance: Canada/UK
- Rank: Lieutenant
- Unit: Canadian Expeditionary Force
- Conflicts: World War I

Hamilton Dawson Jukes (28 May 1895 – 8 January 1951) was a Canadian-born ice hockey player who competed in the 1924 Winter Olympics with the British team.

== Biography ==
Born in Winnipeg, Manitoba, he was a member of the British ice hockey team, which won the bronze medal in 1924. After being invalidated out of the army in 1917, he settled in Newcastle-upon-Tyne before starting work as an engineer in the oil industry for British American Oil. He worked and lived in Colombia and Peru for 25 years with his first wife, Dilys Gwendolyn (Rees), and their five children, Dilys Mary (Shan) - (born 1918), Margaret Cleaton - (born 1919), Yvonne Sarah (born 1920), Maureen Hamilton - (born 1921), and Arthur Hamilton (born 1922). He remarried and moved to Escondido, California in late 1948. Jukes and his second wife, Margaret, had two sons, Hamilton Dawson Jr. and John Frederick. Jukes died by suicide in Escondido, California in 1951.
