= Lorne Carr-Harris =

British ice hockey player

Lorne Howland Carr-Harris
- Born: 15 December 1899; Kingston, Ontario
- Died: 7 April 1981 (aged 81)
- Allegiance: Canada
- Branch: British Army
- Other work: soldier

Lorne Howland Carr-Harris (15 December 1899 – 7 April 1981) was a British ice hockey player who competed in the 1924 Winter Olympics. He was the goaltender of the British ice hockey team, which won the bronze medal. He was a member of the team that won World Championship bronze in 1924.

== Family ==
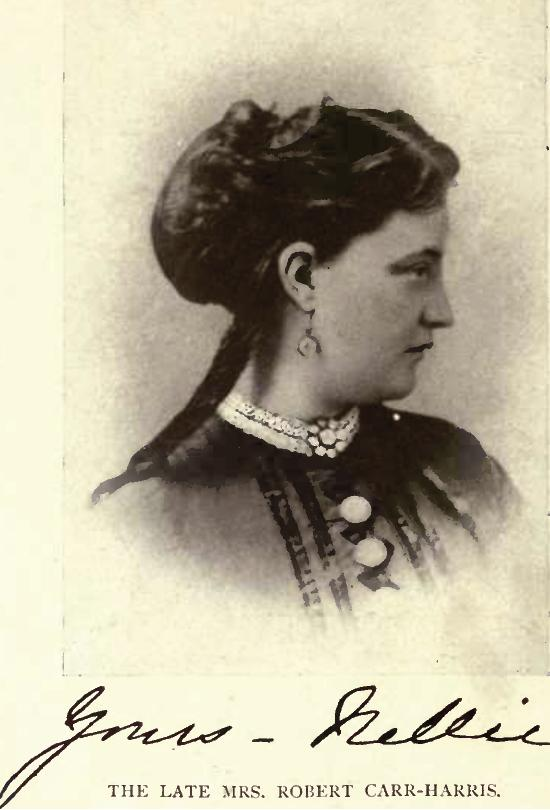
Mrs Ellen Jane Carr-Harris (née Fitton) wife Robert Carr-Harris

His grandfather was Alexander Harris (writer) who married Ursula Carr in 1842. They had several children including a son, Robert Carr Harris, who was born in 1843.

His father Professor Robert Carr-Harris (1891–1936) met his future wife Ellen Jane Fitton, the daughter of local entrepreneur and land owner R. W. Fitton, Esquire, M.D. in Bathurst, Ontario, and his wife (Sarah Harriet Munro), a daughter of William Johnson Munro, son of Captain John Munro UE. In 1875, the couple resided at Somersetvale Bathurst, a 2000-acre estate. The couple purchased the Somerset Vale farm and Robert Carr Harris became a business man running a sawmill at the mouth of Carter's Brook on the west side of the Bathurst Harbour. Robert Carr-Harris patented the "Railway Screw Snow Excavator" Snow blower in 1870. Robert-Carr-Harris was professor of civil engineering at Royal Military College of Canada 1879 and afterward professor of general engineering at Queen's University. She died in Kingston on February 23, 1890, leaving four sons and two daughters: Mary Alexandria (b. Mar 1, 1875); Ferguson (b. Dec 25, 1877); Dale (b. Feb 14, 1878); Margaret (b. Jul 4, 1878); Robert (b. April 1881); Athol (b. Sep 1883); Grant (b. Jun 1898); Guy (b. Jun 1898); Lorne (b. Dec 1899); All of his brothers and two of his cousins were cadets at RMC. Lorne's brother Captain Ernest Dale Carr-Harris, R.E. was killed in action in Tanzania, Africa on November 3, 1914. One daughter, Mrs. J. A. Gunn, lived at Cairo, Egypt. Professor Carr-Harris married, secondly, June 6, 1896, Miss Bertha Wright, of Ottawa. His brother Brian Carr-Harris played for Great Britain in the 1931 World Championship. His son, John Carr-Harris played for the Washington Lions of the American Hockey League.

== Education ==
Born in Kingston, Ontario, he joined the British Army and graduated from the Royal Military College of Canada in 1917.

== Career ==
Carr-Harris served with the British army and was posted to India for 13 years. He was stationed in the UK in 1924. The British Army hockey team formed the backbone of the British team at the Winter Olympics in Chamonix, France.

== Legacy ==
The Carr-Harris Cup is an annual varsity hockey game between the Royal Military College of Canada and Queen's University in Kingston, Ontario.

Olympic medal record

Men's Ice hockey
Bronze medal – third place	1924 Chamonix	Team competition
