= Guy Clarkson =

British ice hockey player

- Born: George Elliott Clarkson; 1 January 1891; York County, Ontario, Canada
- Died: 9 October 1974 (aged 83); London, England
- Education: University of Toronto; University of Leeds
Ice hockey career
- Played for: British Olympic team (1924)
- National team: United Kingdom
Medal record
Men's Ice hockey
Bronze medal – third place	1924 Chamonix	Team competition

George Elliott "Guy" Clarkson (1 January 1891 – 9 October 1974) was a British ice hockey player who competed in the 1924 Winter Olympics. He was born in York County, Ontario and died in London. In 1924 he was player-coach for the British ice hockey team, which won the bronze medal.

== Biography ==
Guy Clarkson was a graduate of the University of Toronto but, having graduated in 1913, he was from an earlier generation of hockey players than the Toronto team that represented Canada in the 1924 Olympics. Clarkson moved to England to study chemistry at the University of Leeds and soon became one of the foremost players in the country. After service in World War One, he returned to playing and was a member of an unofficial British team that won the Bouvier Cup in St. Moritz in 1920. In Chamonix Clarkson was player-coach of the British team although it seems he did not see much time on the ice.

He met his wife whilst in England and worked as an engineer for her father's steel company. As his wife was Jewish he decided to move back to Canada after visiting Vienna in 1938 in the aftermath of the Anschluss. Clarkson founded a printing company in Buffalo, New York USA which later became a successful publicly held corporation.
