= Ross Cuthbert (ice hockey) =

British ice hockey player

Personal information
- Born: Cuthbert Ross Cuthbert; February 6, 1892 Calgary, Northwest Territories, Canada
- Died: January 19, 1971 (aged 78) Bermuda
- Spouses: Beatrice Kirk (m. 1934, divorced) Jane Derby (m. 1964; died 1965)
Medal record
Men's Ice hockey
Bronze medal – third place	1924 Chamonix	Team competition

Cuthbert Ross Cuthbert (February 6, 1892 — January 19, 1971) was a Canada ice hockey player who competed in the 1924 Winter Olympics and 1928 Winter Olympics.

== Early life ==
Cuthbert was born in Calgary, Northwest Territories. He travelled to Britain as part of the Canadian Expeditionary Force and served in France during World War II.

== Career ==
At the 1924 Winter Olympics in Chamonix, he was a member of the British ice hockey team which won the bronze medal. He then appeared at the 1926 Ice Hockey European Championship and, two years later, finished fourth with the British team in the 1928 Olympic tournament in St. Moritz. At the club level, Cuthbert initially played for Princes Ice Hockey Club. He later joined the United Services Portsmouth Hockey Club.

== Personal life ==
Cuthbert rose to the rank of lieutenant colonel in the British Army, but retired from his military career in 1931 and travelled to the United States, where he married the Chicago soap heiress Beatrice Kirk in 1934. This marriage ended in divorce. He married again in 1964, at the age of 72, to the American fashion designer Jane Derby. She died the following year. Cuthbert spent his retirement in Bermuda, where he died in 1971.
