= Henri Willems =

Belgian bobsledder

Olympic medal record

Bobsleigh
Bronze medal – third place	1924 Chamonix	Four-man

Henri P. Willems (born 30 September 1899, date of death unknown) was a Belgian bobsledder who competed during the early 1920s. He won a bronze medal in the four-man event at the 1924 Winter Olympics in Chamonix.
