= Alfred Neveu =

Swiss bobsledder (1890–1975)

Olympic medal record

Bobsleigh
Gold medal – first place	1924 Chamonix	Four-man

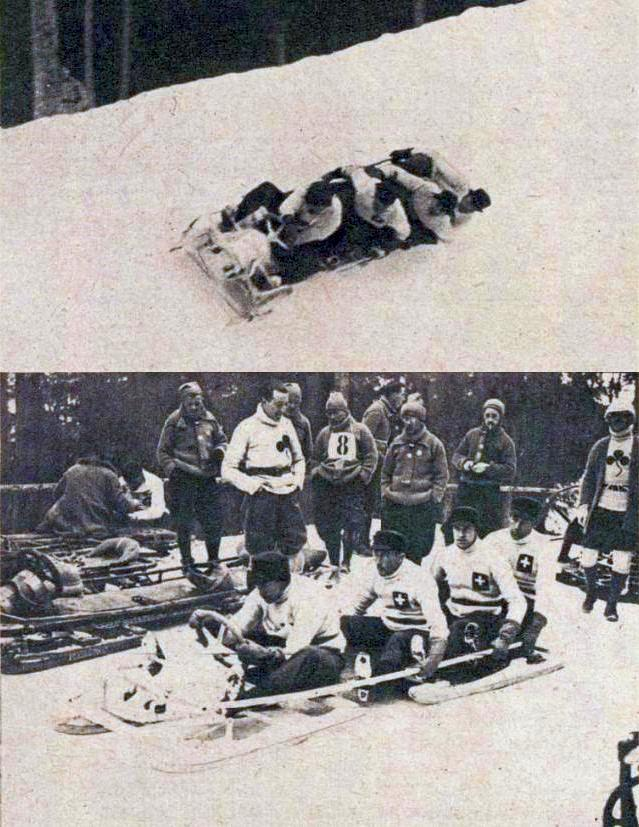

Alfred Neveu (24 December 1890, Leysin, Vaud - 20 May 1975) was a Swiss bobsledder who competed during the early 1920s. He won the gold medal in the four-man event at the 1924 Winter Olympics in Chamonix.
