= Eduard Scherrer =

Swiss bobsledder (1890–1972)

Olympic medal record

Bobsleigh
Gold medal – first place	1924 Chamonix	Four-man

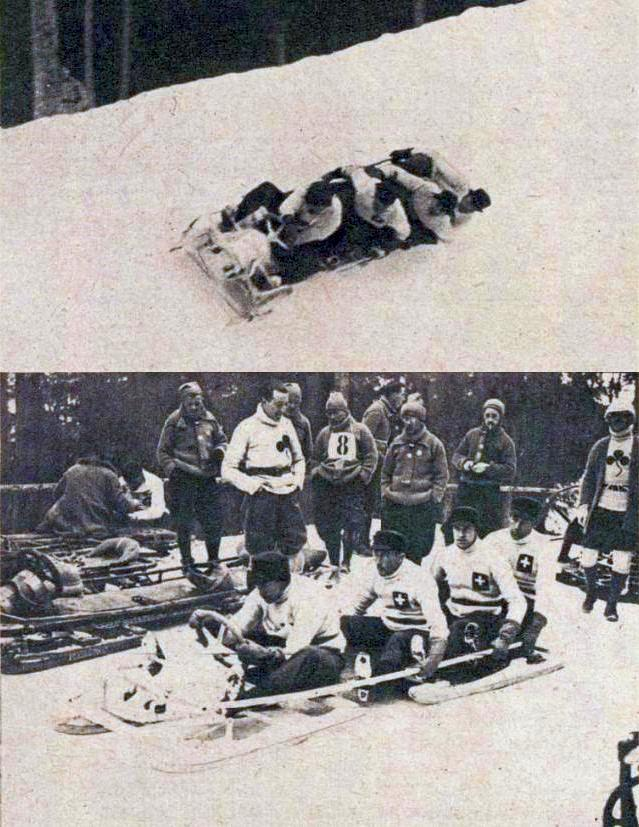
The Swiss bobsleigh team (from Leysin), Olympic champion in 1924 in Chamonix (L. to R. Scherrer, Neveu, and the Schlappi brothers).jpg

Edouard Eugène Scherrer (April 29, 1890 - July 4, 1972) was a Swiss bobsledder who competed during the early 1920s. He won the gold medal in the four-man event at the 1924 Winter Olympics in Chamonix.
