= Charles Mulder =

Belgian bobsledder and ice hockey player

Personal information
- Born: 1 July 1897 Antwerp, Belgium
- Died: 7 July 1953 (aged 56) Antwerp, Belgium

Sport
- Sport: Bobsleigh, ice hockey
Medal record
Representing Belgium
Olympic Games
Bronze medal – third place	1924 Chamonix	Four-man bobseligh
Ice Hockey European Championships
Bronze medal – third place	1924 Milan	Team

Charles Marie Aloy Mulder (1 July 1897 - 7 July 1953) was a Belgian bobsledder and ice hockey player. He won two bronze medals in 1924: in the four-man bobsleigh event at the 1924 Winter Olympics and in ice hockey at the European Championship. He finished 16th in the four-man bobsleigh event at the 1928 Olympics.
