= René Mortiaux =

Belgian bobsledder

Olympic medal record

Bobsleigh
| Bronze medal – third place | 1924 Chamonix | Four-man |

René Mortiaux (born 1881, date of death unknown) was a Belgian bobsledder who competed during the early 1920s. He won a bronze medal in the four-man event at the 1924 Winter Olympics in Chamonix.
