= Paul Van den Broeck =

Belgian bobsledder and ice hockey player

- Born: 18 September 1894 Antwerp
- Died: 1 April 1972 (aged 77)
- Position: Goaltender
- National team: Belgium
- Playing career: 1922–1928

Olympic medal record

Bobsleigh

Representing Belgium
Bronze medal – third place	1924 Chamonix	Four-man

Paul Norbert van den Broeck (18 September 1904 – 1 April 1972) was a Belgian bobsledder and ice hockey player who competed during the early 1920s. At the 1924 Winter Olympics in Chamonix, he won a bronze medal in the four-man bobsleigh event. He was also a member of the Belgian ice hockey team, which was eliminated in the first round of the 1924 Olympic tournament.
