= Heinrich Schläppi =

Swiss bobsledder (1905–1958)

Olympic medal record

Bobsleigh
Gold medal – first place	1924 Chamonix	Four-man

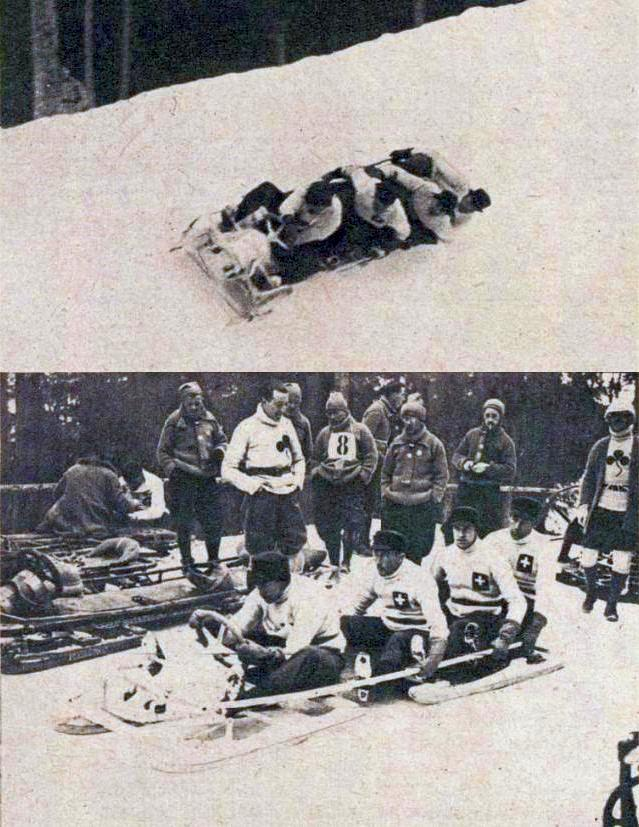
The Swiss bobsleigh team (from Leysin), Olympic champion in 1924 in Chamonix (L. to R. Scherrer, Neveu, and the Schlappi brothers).jpg

Heinrich Schläppi (30 April 1905 – 15 February 1958) was a Swiss bobsledder who competed during the early 1920s. He won the gold medal in the four-man event at the 1924 Winter Olympics in Chamonix.

Preceded by (Germany) Joseph Goebbels	President of Organizing Committee for Winter Olympic Games (with Alfred Schläppi ) 1948	Succeeded by HM the King of Norway Haakon VII, Princess Astrid of Norway, House of Glücksburg & Olaf Helset
