= Ralph Broome (bobsledder) =

British Army officer and bobsledder

Olympic medal record

Bobsleigh
| Silver medal – second place | 1924 Chamonix | Four-man |

Lieutenant colonel Ralph Howard Broome DSO MC (5 July 1889 – 25 January 1985) was a British Army officer and bobsledder who competed during the early 1920s. He was born in Dalhousie, Himachal Pradesh, India, and died in Poole, Dorset, England.

== Honours ==
Broome won a silver medal in the four-man event at the 1924 Winter Olympics in Chamonix.

Earlier, Broome had been awarded the Military Cross (1915) and Distinguished Service Order (1918) while serving with the Wiltshire Regiment in the First World War. He retired from the Royal Tank Corps as a lieutenant colonel in 1935.

== Sources ==
- Bobsleigh four-man Olympic medallists for 1924, 1932–56, and since 1964
- Databaseolympics.com profile
- Wallenchinsky, David. (1984). "Bobsled: Four-Man". In The Complete Book the Olympics: 1896–1980. New York: Penguin Books. p. 559.
