= Thomas Arnold (bobsleigh) =

British bobsledder

Olympic medal record

Bobsleigh
Silver medal – second place	1924 Chamonix	Four-man

Terence Arbuthnot Arnold (5 April 1901 – 5 July 1986) was a British bobsledder who competed during the early 1920s. He won a silver medal in the four-man event at the 1924 Winter Olympics in Chamonix.
