= Rodney Soher =

British bobsledder

Olympic medal record

Bobsleigh
| Silver medal – second place | 1924 Chamonix | Four-man |

Rodney Ewart Soher (27 November 1893 – 25 January 1983) was a British bobsledder who competed during the early 1920s. He won a silver medal in the four-man event at the 1924 Winter Olympics in Chamonix.

== Personal life ==
Soher shared a home in Beverly Hills with actor Edmund Gwenn.
