= Alfred Schläppi =

Swiss bobsledder (1898–1981)

Olympic medal record

Bobsleigh
| Gold medal – first place | 1924 Chamonix | Four-man |

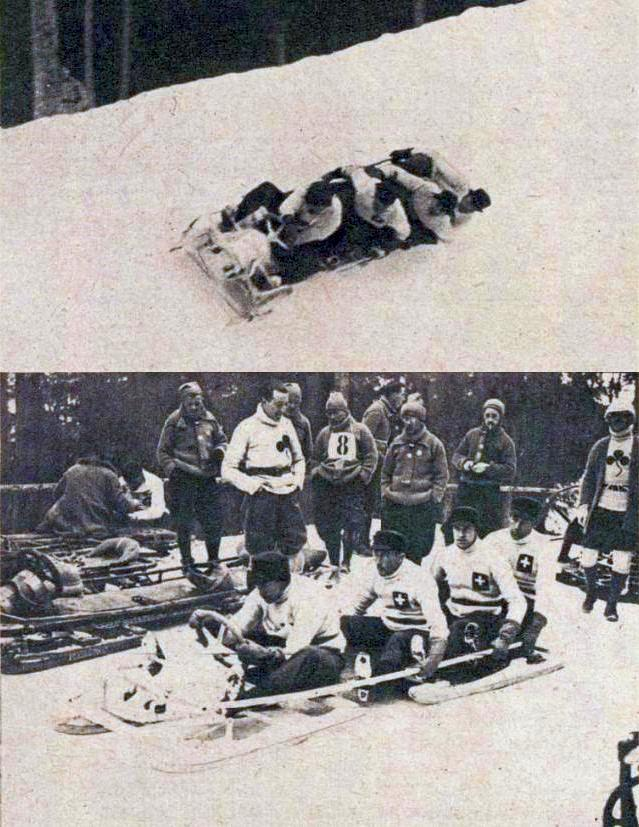
The Swiss bobsleigh team (from Leysin), Olympic champion in 1924 in Chamonix (L. to R. Scherrer, Neveu, and the Schlappi brothers).jpg

Alfred Schläppi (30 January 1898 – 15 April 1981) was a Swiss bobsledder who competed during the early 1920s. He won the gold medal in the four-man event at the 1924 Winter Olympics in Chamonix.

| Preceded by (Germany) Joseph Goebbels | President of Organizing Committee for Winter Olympic Games (with Heinrich Schläppi ) 1948 | Succeeded by Haakon VII of Norway, Astrid of Norway, House of Glücksburg and Olaf Helset |
