= Speed skating at the 1924 Winter Olympics – Men's all-round =

Men's all-round speed skating at the I Olympic Winter Games
- Pictogram for speed skating
- Venue: Stade Olympique de Chamonix
- Date: 26–27 January 1924
- Competitors: 11 from 5 nations
- Winning points: 5.5

Medalists
1st place, gold medalist(s)		Clas Thunberg	Finland
2nd place, silver medalist(s)		Roald Larsen	Norway
3rd place, bronze medalist(s)		Julius Skutnabb	Finland

The all-round speed skating event was part of the speed skating at the 1924 Winter Olympics programme. It was a combined event of all four distances, which were held on Saturday, January 26, 1924 and on Sunday, January 27, 1924 during the Games. It was the only time that medals were awarded in all-round. Twenty-seven speed skaters from twelve nations were scheduled to compete, but four did not come to start at all, while another twelve abstained from one or more races, so that only eleven speed skaters from five nations competed in all four individual events.

== Medalists ==
Gold	Silver	Bronze
Clas Thunberg; Finland	Roald Larsen; Norway	Julius Skutnabb; Finland

== Calculation of points ==
The ranking was determined by the sum of rank points from the individual distances, but only taking into account the results of skaters who finished all four races. Samalog points are also presented here.

== Results ==
Place	Athlete	Points	Score	500 m	1500 m	5000 m	10000 m
1	Clas Thunberg (FIN)	5.5	198.023	1.5	1	1	2
2	Roald Larsen (NOR)	9.5	199.763	1.5	2	3	3
3	Julius Skutnabb (FIN)	11	202.347	4	4	2	1
4	Harald Strøm (NOR)	17	203.657	3	5	5	4
5	Sigurd Moen (NOR)	17	203.783	5	3	4	5
6	Léonhard Quaglia (FRA)	25	210.843	6	7	6	6
7	Alberts Rumba (LAT)	27	212.637	7	6	7	7
8	Leon Jucewicz (POL)	32	226.400	8	8	8	8
9	André Gegout (FRA)	36	236.023	9	9	9	9
–	Asser Wallenius (FIN)	DNF	did not finish 1500 m				
–	George de Wilde (FRA)	DNF	did not finish 10000 m				
–	Gaston Van Hazebroeck (BEL)	DNF	only 500 m, 5000 m and 1500 m				
–	Marcel Moens (BEL)	DNF	only 500 m, 5000 m and 1500 m				
–	Charles Gorman (CAN)	DNF	only 500 m, 5000 m and 1500 m				
–	Axel Blomqvist (SWE)	DNF	only 500 m, 5000 m and 1500 m				
–	Eric Blomgren (SWE)	DNF	only 500 m and 5000 m				
–	Louis De Ridder (BEL)	DNF	only 500 m and 1500 m				
–	Philippe Van Volckxsom (BEL)	DNF	only 500 m and 1500 m				
–	Albert Hassler (FRA)	DNF	only 500 m				
–	Frederick Dix (GBR)	DNF	only 500 m				
–	Bernard Sutton (GBR)	DNF	only 500 m				
–	Cyril Horn (GBR)	DNF	only 500 m				
–	Albert Tebbit (GBR)	DNF	only 5000 m				
–	Christfried Burmeister (EST)	DNS	did not start				
–	Cesare Locatelli (ITA)	DNS	did not start				
–	Alexander Spengler (SUI)	DNS	did not start				
–	Gustaf Andersson (SWE)	DNS	did not start				

=== Progress of the competition ===
The races were held in this order:

- Saturday morning: 500 m
- Saturday afternoon: 5000 m
- Sunday morning: 1500 m
- Sunday afternoon: 10,000 m

In the table, the place numbers are recalculated after each race, each time including only the athletes that have completed all the distances.

Athlete	Until distance 1			Until distance 2			Until distance 3			Total		
Athlete	Points	Score	rank	Points	Score	rank	Points	Score	rank	Points	Score	rank
Clas Thunberg	1,5	44.80	1	2.5	96.70	1	3.5	143.63	1	5.5	198.02	1st place, gold medalist(s)
Roald Larsen	1,5	44.80	1	4.5	97.82	2	6.5	145.15	2	9.5	199.76	2nd place, silver medalist(s)
Julius Skutnabb	7	46.40	7	8	99.24	3	11	148.11	3	11	202.35	3rd place, bronze medalist(s)
Harald Strøm	6	45.60	6	10	99.06	4	14	148.73	5	17	203.66	4
Sigurd Moen	9	47.20	9	12	100.30	6	13	148.83	4	17	203.78	5
Léon Quaglia	10	48.40	10	15	103.26	8	21	155.59	8	25	210.84	6
Alberts Rumba	11	48.80	11	18	104.24	10	21	154.91	7	27	212.64	7
Leon Jucewicz	12	49.60	12	22	110.16	11	27	164.36	9	32	226.40	8
André Gegout	15	53.20	15	25	114.72	12	31	172.85	10	36	236.02	9
Axel Blomqvist	4	45.20	4	14	104.08	7	18	156.21	6	DNF		
Gaston van Hazebroeck	17	55.80	17	26	117.18	13	33	175.45	11	DNF		
Georges de Wilde	16	54.80	16	27	118.78	14	35	177.11	12	DNF		
Marcel Moens	21	62.20	21	28	131.24	15	39	196.84	13	DNF		
Asser Wallenius	3	45.00	3	10	100.28	5	DNF					
Eric Blomgren	8	46.60	8	16	102.06	9	DNF					
Charles Gorman	5	45.40	5	DNF								
Albert Hassler	13	50.60	13	DNF								
Louis de Ridder	14	52.80	14	DNF								
Philippe van Volckxsom	18.5	56.40	18	DNF								
Fred Dix	18.5	56.40	18	DNF								
Tom Sutton	20	60.80	20	DNF								
Cyril Horn	22	64.40	22	DNF								
