= Speed skating at the 1924 Winter Olympics – Men's 500 metres =

Men's 500 metres speed skating at the I Olympic Winter Games
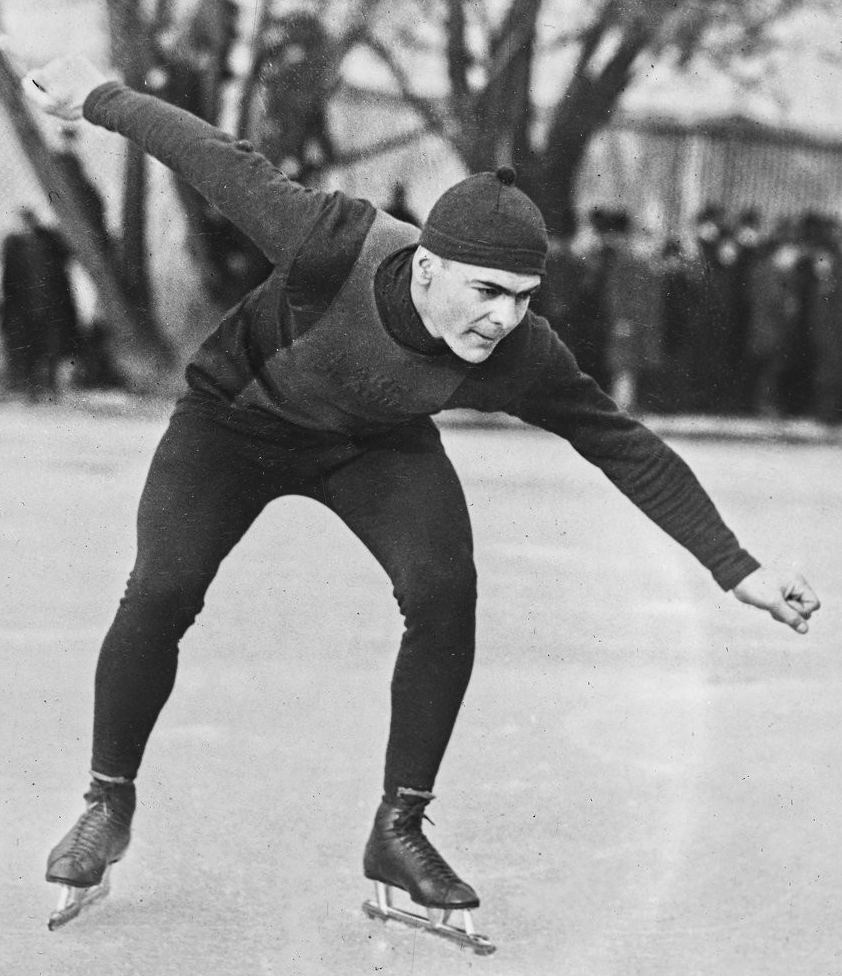
- Gold medallist Charles Jewtraw in 1921
- Venue: Stade Olympique de Chamonix
- Date: 26 January 1924
- Competitors: 27 from 10 nations
- Winning time: 44.0 seconds OR

Medalists
| 1st place, gold medalist(s) | | Charles Jewtraw | United States |
| 2nd place, silver medalist(s) | | Oskar Olsen | Norway |
| 3rd place, bronze medalist(s) | | Roald Larsen | Norway |
| 3rd place, bronze medalist(s) | | Clas Thunberg | Finland |

Archive Video

The 500 metres speed skating event at the 1924 Winter Olympics was held on 26 January 1924 at the Stade Olympique de Chamonix in Chamonix, France. One of five speed skating races to be contested at these Games, this was the first event ever contested at the Winter Olympics. The event was won by American Charles Jewtraw who became the first Winter Olympics gold medallist.

== Summary ==
The event required competitors to skate one and quarter laps of the 400 metre track. Under the rules of the International Skating Union, athletes raced in pairs in a straight time-trial event. Prior to the event, the pairs were determined by the drawing of lots. With 31 speed skaters from 13 nations due to compete, this was reduced to 27 from 10 nations after the withdrawal of four athletes, including Christfried Burmeister who was due to be Estonia's only representative at the inaugural Winter Games. He did not enter the Chamonix event and his withdrawal was not communicated to the organisers of the Games in time. This resulted in a slight reordering of the skaters.

Leading up the Games, the Finnish team was training in Davos where Clas Thunberg had set a time of 43.8 seconds, four tenths slower than Oscar Mathisen's world record. Mathisen's professional status prevented him from participating in these Games. The Americans took part in metric competitions at Saranac Lake, where Jewtraw set a time of 46.6 seconds. He also set a new world record in the 100 yard event in 9.4 seconds whilst Roald Larsen of Norway skated 44.6 seconds in Frogner.

Joe Moore of the United States and Eric Blomgren of Sweden became the first athletes to ever compete at the Winter Olympics, with Moore setting the first Olympic record covering the distance in 45.6 seconds. Asser Wallenius of Finland, bettered Moore's time by six-tenths of a second to move into first position with 11 skaters remaining. Next to skate was the eventual silver medallist Norway's Oskar Olsen who crossed the line in 44.2 seconds. The world champion Clas Thunberg and Norway's Roald Larsen had to settle for sharing the bronze medal with a time of 44.8 seconds. The gold medal performance came from pair 15 where American Jewtraw was up against Charles Gorman. The Canadian took the lead, before he was soon overtaken by Jewtraw finishing in a time of 44 seconds.

Jewtraw coming from a poor family found the sport expensive but found sponsorship from Lake Placid businessman Jack Mabbit. He had retired before the 1924 Games but returned to the sport to compete in France. After competing in the 1500 and 5000 metre events at these Games he retired for good. Jewtraw's gold medal is on display at the Smithsonian Institution in Washington, D.C.

== Records ==
Prior to this competition, the existing world and Olympic records were as follows.

| World record | Oscar Mathisen (NOR) | 43.4 | Davos, Switzerland | 17 January 1914 | |
| Olympic record | N/A | N/A | N/A | N/A | N/A |

The following records were set during this competition.

| Date | Round | Athlete | Country | Time | Record |
|---|---|---|---|---|---|
| 26 January 1924 | Pair 1 | Joe Moore | United States | 45.6 | OR |
| 26 January 1924 | Pair 11 | Asser Wallenius | Finland | 45.0 | OR |
| 26 January 1924 | Pair 12 | Oskar Olsen | Norway | 44.2 | OR |
| 26 January 1924 | Pair 15 | Charles Jewtraw | United States | 44.0 | OR |

== Results ==
The event began Saturday at 10:00.

| Rank | Pair | Name | Country | Time | Time behind | Notes |
|---|---|---|---|---|---|---|
| 1st place, gold medalist(s) | 15 | Charles Jewtraw | United States | 44.0 | — | OR |
| 2nd place, silver medalist(s) | 12 | Oskar Olsen | Norway | 44.2 | +0.2 | OR |
| = (bronze) | 17 | Roald Larsen | Norway | 44.8 | +0.8 | (Note: Originally in pair 2 with Burmeister) |
| = (bronze) | 14 | Clas Thunberg | Finland | 44.8 | +0.8 | |
| 5 | 11 | Asser Wallenius | Finland | 45.0 | +1.0 | OR |
| 6 | 13 | Axel Blomqvist | Sweden | 45.2 | +1.2 | |
| 7 | 15 | Charles Gorman | Canada | 45.4 | +1.4 | |
| =8 | 1 | Joe Moore | United States | 45.6 | +1.6 | OR |
| =8 | 13 | Harald Strøm | Norway | 45.6 | +1.6 | |
| 10 | 10 | Julius Skutnabb | Finland | 46.4 | +2.4 | |
| 11 | 1 | Eric Blomgren | Sweden | 46.6 | +2.6 | |
| 12 | 6 | Harry Kaskey | United States | 47.0 | +3.0 | |
| 13 | 5 | Sigurd Moen | Norway | 47.2 | +3.2 | |
| 14 | 12 | Bill Steinmetz | United States | 47.8 | +3.8 | |
| 15 | 3 | Léonhard Quaglia | France | 48.4 | +4.4 | |
| 16 | 18 | Alberts Rumba | Latvia | 48.8 | +4.8 | (Note: Originally in pair 7 with Tebbit) |
| 17 | 4 | Leon Jucewicz | Poland | 49.6 | +5.6 | |
| 18 | 3 | Albert Hassler | France | 50.6 | +6.6 | |
| 19 | 14 | Louis De Ridder | Belgium | 52.8 | +8.8 | |
| 20 | 11 | André Gegout | France | 53.2 | +9.2 | |
| 21 | 17 | Georges de Wilde | France | 54.8 | +10.8 | (Note: Originally in pair 16 by himself) |
| 22 | 8 | Gaston Van Haezebrouck | Belgium | 55.8 | +11.8 | |
| =23 | 8 | Fred Dix | Great Britain | 56.4 | +12.4 | |
| =23 | 10 | Philippe Van Volckxsom | Belgium | 56.4 | +12.4 | |
| 25 | 5 | Bernard Sutton | Great Britain | 1:00.8 | +16.8 | |
| 26 | 6 | Marcel Moens | Belgium | 1:02.2 | +18.2 | |
| 27 | 4 | Cyril Horn | Great Britain | 1:04.4 | +20.4 | |
| | 2 | Christfried Burmeister | Estonia | | | DNS |
| | 7 | Albert Tebbit | Great Britain | | | DNS |
| | 9 | Alexander Spengler | Switzerland | | | DNS |
| | 9 | Cesare Locatelli | Italy | | | DNS |

== Officials ==
The officials for the events were as follows.

| Role | Name | Country |
|---|---|---|
| Judge Referee | Captain Hammerstad | Norway |
| Starter | Hans Vallar | Switzerland |
| Timekeeper | Ch. Faroux | France |
| Timekeeper | Degraine | France |
| Timekeeper | Goury | France |
| Timekeeper | Meiers | France |
| Timekeeper | Captain Levalhati | Finland |
| Turns | Poplimont | Belgium |
| Turns | Taylor | United States |
| Turns | R. George | France |
| Commissioners at the crossroads | Steen Peterson | Norway |
| Commissioners at the crossroads | Maucourt | France |
| Commissioners at the crossroads | Valley | France |
| Delegates to the athletes | Ch. Sabouret | France |
| Delegates to the athletes | Becci | France |
