= Speed skating at the 1924 Winter Olympics – Men's 5000 metres =

Men's 5000 metres speed skating at the I Olympic Winter Games
- Pictogram for speed skating
- Venue: Stade Olympique de Chamonix
- Date: 26 January 1924
- Competitors: 22 from 10 nations
- Winning time: 8:39.0 OR

Medalists
1st place, gold medalist(s)		Clas Thunberg	Finland
2nd place, silver medalist(s)		Julius Skutnabb	Finland
3rd place, bronze medalist(s)		Roald Larsen	Norway

The 5000 metres speed skating event was part of the speed skating at the 1924 Winter Olympics programme. The competition was held on Saturday, January 26, 1924. Thirty-one speed skaters from thirteen nations were due to compete, but nine athletes withdrew, so in the end twenty-two speed skaters from ten nations competed. The Canadian athlete Charles Gorman abandoned the race after the first round.

== Medalists ==
Gold	Silver	Bronze
Clas Thunberg; Finland	Julius Skutnabb; Finland	Roald Larsen; Norway

== Records ==
These were the standing world and Olympic records (in minutes) prior to the 1924 Winter Olympics.

World record	Harald Strøm (NOR)	8:26.5	Kristiania, Norway	17 February 1922	(Note: The record was set on naturally frozen ice.)
Olympic record	N/A	N/A	N/A	N/A	N/A

The following records were set during this competition.

Date	Round	Athlete	Country	Time	Record
26 January 1924	Pair 3	Léonhard Quaglia	France	9:08.6	OR, NR
26 January 1924	Pair 6	Fridtjof Paulsen	Norway	8:59.0	OR
26 January 1924	Pair 8	Harald Strøm	Norway	8:54.6	OR
26 January 1924	Pair 14	Julius Skutnabb	Finland	8:48.4	OR
26 January 1924	Pair 15	Clas Thunberg	Finland	8:39.0	OR

== Results ==
The event was held Saturday afternoon.

Rank	Pair	Name	Country	Time	Time behind	Notes
1st place, gold medalist(s)	15	Clas Thunberg	Finland	8:39.0	—	OR
2nd place, silver medalist(s)	14	Julius Skutnabb	Finland	8:48.4	+9.4	OR
3rd place, bronze medalist(s)	19	Roald Larsen	Norway	8:50.2	+11.2	(Note: Originally in pair 11 with Van Volckxsom)
4	20	Sigurd Moen	Norway	8:51.0	+12.0	(Note: Originally in pair 5 with Dix)
5	8	Harald Strøm	Norway	8:54.6	+15.6	OR
6	14	Valentine Bialas	United States	8:55.0	+16.0	
7	6	Fridtjof Paulsen	Norway	8:59.0	+20.0	OR
8	9	Richard Donovan	United States	9:05.6	+26.6	
9	3	Léonhard Quaglia	France	9:08.6	+29.6	OR, NR
10	12	Asser Wallenius	Finland	9:12.8	+33.8	
11	15	Alberts Rumba	Latvia	9:14.4	+35.4	
12	20	Eric Blomgren	Sweden	9:14.6	+35.6	(Note: Originally in pair 4 with Sutton)
13	8	Charles Jewtraw	United States	9:27.0	+48.0	
14	18	Bill Steinmetz	United States	9:35.0	+56.0	(Note: Originally in pair 2 with Burmeister)
15	6	Axel Blomqvist	Sweden	9:48.8	+69.8	
16	19	Leon Jucewicz	Poland	10:05.6	+86.6	(Note: Originally in pair 7 with Horn)
17	9	Gaston Van Hazebroeck	Belgium	10:13.8	+94.8	
18	18	André Gegout	France	10:15.2	+96.2	(Note: Originally in pair 10 with Spengler)
19	17	George de Wilde	France	10:39.8	+120.8	(Note: Originally in pair 1 with De Ridder)
20	17	Albert Tebbit	Great Britain	11:01.0	+142.0	(Note: Originally in pair 13 with Locatelli)
21	12	Marcel Moens	Belgium	11:30.4	+171.4	
	3	Charles Gorman	Canada			DNF
	1	Louis De Ridder	Belgium			DNS
	2	Christfried Burmeister	Estonia			DNS
	4	Bernard Sutton	Great Britain			DNS
	5	Frederick Dix	Great Britain			DNS
	7	Cyril Horn	Great Britain			DNS
	10	Alexander Spengler	Switzerland			DNS
	11	Philippe Van Volckxsom	Belgium			DNS
	13	Cesare Locatelli	Italy			DNS
	16	Albert Hassler	France			DNS
