= Speed skating at the 1924 Winter Olympics – Men's 1500 metres =

Men's 1500 metres speed skating at the I Olympic Winter Games
- Pictogram for speed skating
- Venue: Stade Olympique de Chamonix
- Date: 27 January 1924
- Competitors: 22 from 9 nations
- Winning time: 2:20.8 OR

Medalists
1st place, gold medalist(s)		Clas Thunberg	Finland
2nd place, silver medalist(s)		Roald Larsen	Norway
3rd place, bronze medalist(s)		Sigurd Moen	Norway

The 1500 metres speed skating event was part of the speed skating at the 1924 Winter Olympics programme. The competition was held on Sunday, January 27, 1924. Twenty-seven speed skaters from ten nations were due to compete, but five athletes withdrew, so in the end twenty-two speed skaters from nine nations competed. The Finnish athlete Asser Wallenius fell and did not finish the race.

== Medalists ==
Gold	Silver	Bronze
Clas Thunberg; Finland	Roald Larsen; Norway	Sigurd Moen; Norway

== Records ==
These were the standing world and Olympic records (in seconds) prior to the 1924 Winter Olympics.

World record	Oscar Mathisen (NOR)	2:17.4	Kristiania, Norway	17 January 1914	(Note: The record was set in a high altitude venue (more than 1000 metres above sea level) and on naturally frozen ice.)
Olympic record	N/A	N/A	N/A	N/A	N/A

The following records were set during this competition.

Date	Round	Athlete	Country	Time	Record
27 January 1924	Pair 1	André Gegout	France	2:54.4	OR
27 January 1924	Pair 4	Clas Thunberg	Finland	2:20.8	OR
27 January 1924	Pair 10	Léonhard Quaglia	France	2:37.0	NR

== Results ==
The event was held Sunday at midday.

Rank	Pair	Name	Country	Time	Time behind	Notes
1st place, gold medalist(s)	4	Clas Thunberg	Finland	2:20.8	—	OR
2nd place, silver medalist(s)	4	Roald Larsen	Norway	2:22.0	+1.2	
3rd place, bronze medalist(s)	8	Sigurd Moen	Norway	2:25.6	+3.8	
4	12	Julius Skutnabb	Finland	2:26.6	+4.8	
5	12	Harald Strøm	Norway	2:29.0	+8.2	
6	11	Oskar Olsen	Norway	2:29.2	+8.4	
7	16	Harry Kaskey	United States	2:29.8	+9.0	(Note: Originally in pair 7 with Blomgren)
=8	11	Charles Jewtraw	United States	2:31.6	+10.8	
=8	13	Joe Moore	United States	2:31.6	+10.8	
10	10	Alberts Rumba	Latvia	2:32.0	+11.2	
11	13	Charles Gorman	Canada	2:35.4	+14.6	
12	8	Bill Steinmetz	United States	2:36.0	+15.2	
13	9	Axel Blomqvist	Sweden	2:36.4	+15.6	
14	10	Léonhard Quaglia	France	2:37.0	+16.2	NR
15	15	Leon Jucewicz	Poland	2:42.6	+21.8	(Note: Originally in pair 14 with Hassler)
16	1	André Gegout	France	2:54.4	+33.6	OR
17	2	Gaston Van Hazebroeck	Belgium	2:54.8	+34.0	
18	2	George de Wilde	France	2:55.0	+34.2	
19	1	Louis De Ridder	Belgium	3:01.8	+41.0	
20	15	Philippe Van Volckxsom	Belgium	3:14.6	+53.8	(Note: Originally in pair 5 with Dix)
21	16	Marcel Moens	Belgium	3:16.8	+56.0	(Note: Originally in pair 6 with Sutton)
	9	Asser Wallenius	Finland			DNF
	3	Cyril Horn	Great Britain			DNS
	5	Frederick Dix	Great Britain			DNS
	6	Bernard Sutton	Great Britain			DNS
	7	Eric Blomgren	Sweden			DNS
	14	Albert Hassler	France			DNS
