= Speed skating at the 1924 Winter Olympics – Men's 10,000 metres =

Men's 10,000 metres speed skating at the I Olympic Winter Games
- Pictogram for speed skating
- Venue: Stade Olympique de Chamonix
- Date: 27 January 1924
- Competitors: 16 from 6 nations
- Winning time: 18:04.8 OR

Medalists
1st place, gold medalist(s)		Julius Skutnabb	Finland
2nd place, silver medalist(s)		Clas Thunberg	Finland
3rd place, bronze medalist(s)		Roald Larsen	Norway

The 10,000 metres speed skating event was part of the speed skating at the 1924 Winter Olympics programme. The competition was held on Sunday, January 27, 1924. Twenty-one speed skaters from nine nations were due to compete, but five athletes withdrew, so in the end sixteen speed skaters from six nations competed. The French athlete George de Wilde abandoned the race.

== Medalists ==
Gold	Silver	Bronze
Julius Skutnabb; Finland	Clas Thunberg; Finland	Roald Larsen; Norway

== Records ==
These were the standing world and Olympic records (in minutes) prior to the 1924 Winter Olympics.

World record	Oscar Mathisen (NOR)	17:22.6	Kristiania, Norway	1 February 1913	(Note: The record was set on naturally frozen ice.)
Olympic record	N/A	N/A	N/A	N/A	N/A

The following records were set during this competition.

Date	Round	Athlete	Country	Time	Record
27 January 1924	Pair 1	Joe Moore]	Norway	19:36.2	OR
27 January 1924	Pair 2	Harald Strøm	Norway	18:18.6	OR
27 January 1924	Pair 3	Roald Larsen	Norway	18:12.2	OR
27 January 1924	Pair 6	Julius Skutnabb	Finland	18:04.8	OR
27 January 1924	Pair 3	Léonhard Quaglia	France	18:25.0	NR

== Results ==
The event was held Sunday afternoon.

Rank	Pair	Name	Country	Time	Time behind	Notes
1st place, gold medalist(s)	6	Julius Skutnabb	Finland	18:04.8	—	OR
2nd place, silver medalist(s)	6	Clas Thunberg	Finland	18:07.8	+3.0	
3rd place, bronze medalist(s)	3	Roald Larsen	Norway	18:12.2	+7.4	OR
4	8	Fridtjof Paulsen	Norway	18:13.0	+8.2	
5	2	Harald Strøm	Norway	18:18.6	+13.8	OR
6	3	Sigurd Moen	Norway	18:19.0	+14.2	
7	9	Léonhard Quaglia	France	18:25.0	+20.2	NR
8	2	Valentine Bialas	United States	18:34.0	+29.2	
9	8	Richard Donovan	United States	18:57.0	+52.2	
10	9	Asser Wallenius	Finland	19:03.8	+59.0	
11	12	Alberts Rumba	Latvia	19:14.0	+69.2	(Note: Originally in pair 11 with Blomgren)
12	1	Joe Moore	United States	19:36.2	+91.4	OR
13	1	Harry Kaskey	United States	19:45.2	+100.4	
14	12	Leon Jucewicz	Poland	20:40.8	+156.0	(Note: Originally in pair 4 with Blomqvist)
15	13	André Gegout	France	21:03.4	+178.6	(Note: Originally in pair 7 with Van Hazebroeck)
	13	George de Wilde	France			DNF (Note: Originally in pair 10 with Tebbit)
	4	Axel Blomqvist	Sweden			DNS
	5	Marcel Moens	Belgium			DNS
	7	Gaston Van Hazebroeck	Belgium			DNS
	10	Albert Tebbit	Great Britain			DNS
	11	Eric Blomgren	Sweden			DNS
