= 1924 in sports =

1924 in sports describes the year's events in world sport.

== American football ==
- NFL championship – Cleveland Bulldogs (7–1–1)

== Association football ==
England

- The Football League – Huddersfield Town 57 points, Cardiff City 57, Sunderland 53, Bolton Wanderers 50, Sheffield United 50, Aston Villa 49
- FA Cup final – Newcastle United 2–0 Aston Villa at Empire Stadium, Wembley, London

Germany

- National Championship – 1. FC Nürnberg 2–0 Hamburger SV at Berlin

Greece

- AEK Athens officially founded on April 13.

Monaco

- AS Monaco officially founded on August 23.

Peru

- Club Universitario de Deportes was founded in Javier Prado Avenue area, Lima on August 7.

== Athletics ==
Men's 1500 metres

- Paavo Nurmi (Finland) breaks the world record by running a time of 3:52.6 at Helsinki.

England

- 1924 Women's Olympiad, Stamford Bridge, London

== Australian rules football ==
VFL Premiership

- Essendon wins the 28th VFL Premiership: under the finals system used, no Grand Final is played.

Brownlow Medal

- The inaugural Brownlow Medal is awarded to Edward Greeves of Geelong.

== Bandy ==
Sweden

- Championship final – Västerås SK 4–1 IF Linnéa

== Baseball ==
World Series

- 4–10 October — Washington Senators (AL) defeats New York Giants (NL) to win the 1924 World Series by 4 games to 3

Negro leagues

- Kansas City Monarchs (NNL) defeats Hilldale (ECL) 5 games to 4 with 1 tie in the first official Negro World Series.
- Pitcher Nip Winters wins a record 27 games for Hilldale in the ECL regular season.

== Biathlon ==
1924 Winter Olympics

- Military patrol, the forerunner of biathlon which combines cross-country skiing and rifle shooting, is staged as a demonstration event at the inaugural Winter Olympics in Chamonix. The winning team is Switzerland.

== Bobsleigh ==
1924 Winter Olympics

- Bobsleigh debuts as an Olympic sport at Chamonix at the inaugural Winter Olympics. The sole event is the 4-man bob which is won by Switzerland I (gold) ahead of Great Britain II (silver) and Belgium I (bronze).

== Boxing ==
Events

- 10 August — the World Featherweight Championship title becomes vacant as Johnny Dundee relinquishes it to fight as a lightweight

Lineal world champions

- World Heavyweight Championship – Jack Dempsey
- World Light Heavyweight Championship – Mike McTigue
- World Middleweight Championship – Harry Greb
- World Welterweight Championship – Mickey Walker
- World Lightweight Championship – Benny Leonard
- World Featherweight Championship – Johnny Dundee → vacant
- World Bantamweight Championship – Joe Lynch → Abe Goldstein → Eddie "Cannonball" Martin
- World Flyweight Championship – Pancho Villa

== Canadian football ==
Grey Cup

- 12th Grey Cup in the Canadian Football League – Queen's University 11–2 Toronto Balmy Beach

== Cricket ==
Events

- England defeats South Africa 3–0 with two matches drawn. There is a sensational start to the series when the South Africans are bowled out for only 30, in just 12.3 overs, in their first innings of the First Test at Edgbaston, England having made over 400.

England

- County Championship – Yorkshire
- Minor Counties Championship – Berkshire
- Most runs – Frank Woolley 2344 @ 49.87 (HS 202)
- Most wickets – Maurice Tate 205 @ 13.74 (BB 8–18)
- Wisden Cricketers of the Year – Bob Catterall, Jack MacBryan, Herbie Taylor, Dick Tyldesley, Dodger Whysall

Australia

- Sheffield Shield – Victoria
- Most runs – Bill Ponsford 777 @ 111.00 (HS 248)
- Most wickets – Albert Hartkopf and Norman Williams 26 apiece

India

- Bombay Quadrangular – Hindus

New Zealand

- Plunket Shield – Wellington

South Africa

- Currie Cup – not contested

West Indies

- Inter-Colonial Tournament – Barbados

== Curling ==
1924 Winter Olympics

- Curling is played at the inaugural Winter Olympics. It is a demonstration sport at the time but is retrospectively granted official status. The gold medal is won by the Great Britain and Ireland team.

== Cycling ==
Tour de France

- Ottavio Bottecchia (Italy) wins the 18th Tour de France

== Field hockey ==
Events

- 7 January — the International Hockey Federation (FIH) is founded in Paris by seven member countries: Austria, Belgium, Czechoslovakia, France, Hungary, Spain and Switzerland.

== Figure skating ==
Events

- Figure skating is included in the inaugural Winter Olympics, having already featured in the 1908 and 1920 Summer Olympics. The Olympic gold medallists and the world championship winners are the same in all three events.

1924 Winter Olympics

- Men's individual – Gillis Grafström (Sweden)
- Women's individual – Herma Szabo (Austria)
- Pairs – Helene Engelmann and Alfred Berger (Austria)

World Figure Skating Championships

- World Men's Champion – Gillis Grafström (Sweden)
- World Women's Champion – Herma Szabo (Austria)
- World Pairs Champions – Helene Engelmann and Alfred Berger (Austria)

== Golf ==
Major tournaments

- British Open – Walter Hagen
- US Open – Cyril Walker
- USPGA Championship – Walter Hagen

Other tournaments

- British Amateur – Ernest Holderness
- US Amateur – Bobby Jones

== Horse racing ==
Events

- The inaugural running of the Cheltenham Gold Cup is won by Red Splash

England

- Cheltenham Gold Cup – Red Splash
- Grand National – Master Robert
- 1,000 Guineas Stakes – Plack
- 2,000 Guineas Stakes – Diophon
- The Derby – Sansovino
- The Oaks – Straitlace
- St. Leger Stakes – Salmon-Trout

Australia

- Melbourne Cup – Backwood

Canada

- King's Plate – Maternal Pride

France

- Prix de l'Arc de Triomphe – Massine

Ireland

- Irish Grand National – Kilbarry
- Irish Derby Stakes – Haine dead heated with Zodiac

USA

- Kentucky Derby – Black Gold
- Preakness Stakes – Nellie Morse
- Belmont Stakes – Mad Play

== Ice hockey ==
Events

- Ice hockey is included in the inaugural Winter Olympics, having already featured in the 1920 Summer Olympics. Canada successfully defends the Olympic title.

1924 Winter Olympics

- Gold Medal – Canada
- Silver Medal – USA
- Bronze Medal – Great Britain

Stanley Cup

- 22–25 March — Montreal Canadiens defeats Calgary Tigers by 2 games to 0 in the 1924 Stanley Cup Finals

Events

- Sault Ste. Marie Greyhounds defeats the Winnipeg Selkirks 6–3 to win the Allan Cup
- 1 December — the expansion Boston Bruins and Montreal Maroons of the NHL play their inaugural game against each other at Boston. Boston wins this game 2–1 but then lose eleven in a row.

== Nordic skiing ==
Events

- Nordic skiing stages its first international competitions at the inaugural Winter Olympics in Chamonix. Four events are held (for men only): cross-country skiing over 18 km and 50 km; ski jumping on the large hill; and Nordic combined as an individual event.

1924 Winter Olympics

- Cross-country skiing (18 km) – gold medal: Thorleif Haug (Norway)
- Cross-country skiing (50 km) – gold medal: Thorleif Haug (Norway)
- Ski jumping – gold medal: Jacob Tullin Thams (Norway)
- Nordic combined – gold medal: Thorleif Haug (Norway)

== Olympic Games ==
1924 Winter Olympics

- The 1924 Winter Olympics, the inaugural Winter Olympics, takes place in Chamonix, France. It is originally called Semaine des Sports d'Hiver, or "International Winter Sports Week".
- Norway wins the most medals (18) and the most gold medals (5)

1924 Summer Olympics

- The 1924 Summer Olympics takes place in Paris
- United States wins the most medals (99) and the most gold medals (45)

== Rowing ==
The Boat Race

- 5 April — Cambridge wins the 76th Oxford and Cambridge Boat Race

== Rugby league ==
- 1924 Great Britain Lions tour

England

- Championship – Batley
- Challenge Cup final – Wigan 21–4 Oldham at Athletic Grounds, Rochdale
- Lancashire League Championship – Wigan
- Yorkshire League Championship – Batley
- Lancashire County Cup – St Helens Recs 17–0 Swinton
- Yorkshire County Cup – Hull F.C. 10–4 Huddersfield

Australia

- NSW Premiership – Balmain 3–0 South Sydney (grand final)

== Rugby union ==
Five Nations Championship

- 37th Five Nations Championship series is won by England who complete the Grand Slam

== Speed skating ==
Events

- Speed skating debuts as an Olympic sport in Chamonix at the inaugural Winter Olympics. Five men only events are held.

Speed Skating World Championships

- Men's All-round Champion – Roald Larsen (Norway)

1924 Winter Olympics

- 500m – gold medal: Charles Jewtraw (USA)
- 1500m – gold medal: Clas Thunberg (Finland)
- 5000m – gold medal: Clas Thunberg (Finland)
- 10000m – gold medal: Julius Skutnabb (Finland)
- All-round – gold medal: Clas Thunberg (Finland)

== Swimming ==
- Johnny Weissmuller sets 100-yard freestyle world record (57.4 seconds) in Miami FL

== Tennis ==
Australia

- Australian Men's Singles Championship – James Anderson (Australia) defeats Richard Schlesinger (Australia) 6–3 6–4 3–6 5–7 6–3
- Australian Women's Singles Championship – Sylvia Lance Harper (Australia) defeats Esna Boyd Robertson (Australia) 6–3 3–6 8–6

England

- Wimbledon Men's Singles Championship – Jean Borotra (France) defeats René Lacoste (France) 6–1 3–6 6–1 3–6 6–4
- Wimbledon Women's Singles Championship – Kitty McKane Godfree (Great Britain) defeats Helen Wills Moody (USA) 4–6 6–4 6–4

France

- French Men's Singles Championship – Jean Borotra (France) defeats René Lacoste (France) 7–5 6–4 0–6 5–7 6–2
- French Women's Singles Championship – Emilienne Didi Vlasto (France) defeats Jeanne Vaussard (France) 6–2 6–3

USA

- American Men's Singles Championship – Bill Tilden (USA) defeats Bill Johnston (USA) 6–1 9–7 6–2
- American Women's Singles Championship – Helen Wills Moody (USA) defeats Molla Bjurstedt Mallory (Norway) 6–1 6–3

Davis Cup

- 1924 International Lawn Tennis Challenge – United States 5–0 Australia at Germantown Cricket Club (grass) Philadelphia, United States
