= United States at the 1924 Winter Olympics =

- Flag of the United States
- IOC code: USA
- NOC: United States Olympic Committee

in Chamonix
- Competitors: 24 (22 men, 2 women) in 5 sports
- Flag bearer: Clarence John "Taffy" Abel (ice hockey)
- Medals Ranked 5th: Gold 1 Silver 2 Bronze 1 Total 4

Winter Olympics appearances (overview)
- 1924; 1928; 1932; 1936; 1948; 1952; 1956; 1960; 1964; 1968; 1972; 1976; 1980; 1984; 1988; 1992; 1994; 1998; 2002; 2006; 2010; 2014; 2018; 2022; 2026

The United States competed at the 1924 Winter Olympics in Chamonix, France.

== Medalists ==
The following U.S. competitors won medals at the games. In the by discipline sections below, medalists' names are bolded.

Medal	Name	Sport	Event	Date
Gold	Charles Jewtraw	Speed skating	500 meters	January 26
Silver	Beatrix Loughran	Figure skating	Women's singles	January 31
Silver	United States men's national ice hockey team: Taffy Abel; Herbert Drury; N. Geran; Alphonse Lacroix; John Langley; John Lyons; Justin McCarthy; Willard Rice; Irving Small; Frank Synott	Ice hockey	Men's tournament	February 3
Bronze	Anders Haugen	Ski jumping	Normal hill individual	February 4

== Cross-country skiing ==
Athlete	Event	Time	Rank
John Carleton	18 km	1:45:49.8	30
Anders Haugen	18 km	1:55:04.2	33
Ragnar Omtvedt	18 km	2:05:03.0	35
Sigurd Overby	18 km	1:34:56.0	19

== Figure skating ==
Individual

Athlete	Event	CF	FS	Total		
Athlete	Event	Rank	Rank	Points	Places	Rank
Nathaniel Niles	Men's singles	4	9	274.47	46	6
Theresa Blanchard	Ladies' singles	4	4	249.53	27	4
**Beatrix Loughran**	Ladies' singles	2	3	279.85	14	2nd place, silver medalist(s)

Mixed

Athlete	Event	Points	Score	Rank
Theresa Blanchard; Nathaniel Niles	Pairs	39	9.07	6

== Ice hockey ==
Summary

Team	Event	First round				Medal round		
Team	Event	Opposition Score	Opposition Score	Opposition Score	Rank	Opposition Score	Opposition Score	Rank
**United States men**	Men's tournament	Belgium; **W** 19–0	France; **W** 22–0	Great Britain; **W** 11–0	1 **Q**	Sweden; **W** 20–0	Canada; **L** 1–6	2nd place, silver medalist(s)

Roster

Clarence Abel
Herbert Drury
Alphonse Lacroix
John Langley
John Lyons
Justin McCarthy
Willard Rice
Irving Small
Frank Synott

First round
The top two teams (highlighted) advanced to the medal round.

Team	GP	W	L	GF	GA
United States	3	3	0	52	0
Great Britain	3	2	1	34	16
France	3	1	2	9	42
Belgium	3	0	3	8	45

28 Jan	United States	**19:0** (9:0,6:0,4:0)	Belgium
30 Jan	France	**0:22** (0:12,0:1,0:9)	United States
31 Jan	United States	**11:0** (6:0,2:0,3:0)	Great Britain

Medal round
Results from the group round (Canada-Sweden and United States-Great Britain) carried forward to the medal round.

Team	GP	W	L	GF	GA
Canada	3	3	0	47	3
United States	3	2	1	32	6
Great Britain	3	1	2	6	33
Sweden	3	0	3	3	46

1 Feb	United States	**20:0** (5:0,7:0,8:0)	Sweden
3 Feb	Canada	**6:1** (2:1,3:0,1:0)	United States

== Nordic combined ==
The cross-country skiing part of this event was combined with the 18 km race of cross-country skiing. Those results can be found above in this article in the cross-country skiing section. Some athletes (but not all) entered in both the cross-country skiing and Nordic combined event, their time on the 18 km was used for both events. One would expect that athletes competing at the Nordic combined event, would participate in the cross-country skiing event as well, as they would have the opportunity to win more than one medal. This was not always the case due to the maximum number of athletes (here: 4) could represent a country per event.

The ski jumping (normal hill) event was held separate from the main medal event of ski jumping, results can be found in the table below.

Athlete	Event	Ski Jumping			Cross-country		Total	
Athlete	Event	Distance 1	Distance 2	Points	Time	Points	Points	Rank
John Carleton	Individual	fall	fall	5.833	1:45:49	4.375	5.104	22
Anders Haugen	Individual	fall	46.0	11.500	1:55:04	0.000	5.750	21
Ragnar Omtvedt	Individual	fall	fall	0.000	2:05:03	0.000	0.000	23
Sigurd Overby	Individual	40.0	39.5	14.562	1:34:56	9.875	12.219	11

== Ski jumping ==
The event was unusual in that the bronze medalist was not determined for fifty years. Thorleif Haug of Norway was awarded third place at the event's conclusion, but a clerical error in calculating Haug's score was discovered in 1974 by Jacob Vaage, who further determined Anders Haugen of the United States, who had finished fourth, had actually scored 0.095 points more than Haug. The International Olympic Committee verified this, and in Oslo in September 1974, Haug's daughter presented the medal to the 86-year-old Haugen.

Athlete	Event	Jump 1			Jump 2		Total	
Athlete	Event	Distance	Points	Rank	Distance	Points	Points	Rank
Lemoine Batson	Normal hill	43.5	16.208	13	42.5	16.192	16.200	14
**Anders Haugen**	Normal hill	44.0	18.333	3	44.5	17.500	17.917	3rd place, bronze medalist(s)
Harry Lien	Normal hill	40.0	15.333	16	41.5	14.502	14.918	16

== Speed skating ==
Athlete	Event	Time	Rank
**Charles Jewtraw**	500 m	44.0	1st place, gold medalist(s)
Harry Kaskey	500 m	47.0	12
Joe Moore	500 m	45.6	8
Bill Steinmetz	500 m	47.8	14
Charles Jewtraw	1500 m	2:31.6	8
Harry Kaskey	1500 m	2:29.8	7
Joe Moore	1500 m	2:31.6	8
Bill Steinmetz	1500 m	2:36.0	12
Valentine Bialas	5000 m	8:55.0	6
Richard Donovan	5000 m	9:05.6	8
Charles Jewtraw	5000 m	9:27.0	13
Bill Steinmetz	5000 m	9:35.0	14
Valentine Bialas	10,000 m	18:34.0	8
Richard Donovan	10,000 m	18:57.0	9
Harry Kaskey	10,000 m	19:45.2	13
Joe Moore	10,000 m	19:36.2	12
