= Finland at the 1924 Winter Olympics =

- IOC code: FIN
- NOC: Finnish Olympic Committee
- Website: olympiakomitea.fi (in Finnish and Swedish)

in Chamonix
- Competitors: 17 (16 men, 1 woman) in 6 sports
- Flag bearer: Armas Palmros
- Medals Ranked 2nd: Gold 4 Silver 4 Bronze 3 Total 11

Winter Olympics appearances (overview)
- 1924; 1928; 1932; 1936; 1948; 1952; 1956; 1960; 1964; 1968; 1972; 1976; 1980; 1984; 1988; 1992; 1994; 1998; 2002; 2006; 2010; 2014; 2018; 2022; 2026

Finland competed at the 1924 Winter Olympics in Chamonix, France. Finnish athletes won a total of 11 medals. The majority of these were awarded in speed skating, to Clas Thunberg and Julius Skutnabb.

== Medalists ==
The following Finnish competitors won medals at the Games. In the 'by discipline' sections below, medallists' names are in bold.

Medal	Name	Sport	Event
Gold	Clas Thunberg	Speed skating	Men's 1500 m
Gold	Clas Thunberg	Speed skating	Men's 5000 m
Gold	Julius Skutnabb	Speed skating	Men's 10,000 m
Gold	Clas Thunberg	Speed skating	Men's all-round
Silver	Ludowika Jakobsson; Walter Jakobsson	Figure skating	Pairs
Silver	Väinö Bremer; August Eskelinen; Heikki Hirvonen; Martti Lappalainen	Military patrol	Men's event
Silver	Julius Skutnabb	Speed skating	Men's 5000 m
Silver	Clas Thunberg	Speed skating	Men's 10,000 m
Bronze	Tapani Niku	Cross-country skiing	Men's 18 km
Bronze	Clas Thunberg	Speed skating	Men's 500 m
Bronze	Julius Skutnabb	Speed skating	Men's all-round

== Cross-country skiing ==
Men

Event	Athlete	Race	
Event	Athlete	Time	Rank
18 km	Anton Collin	1'33:54.6	16
18 km	Matti Ritola	1'25:13.0	11
18 km	Matti Raivio	1'19:10.4	7
18 km	**Tapani Niku**	1'16:26.0	3rd place, bronze medalist(s)
50 km	Anton Collin	DNF	
50 km	Erkki Kämäräinen	DNF	
50 km	Tapani Niku	DNF	
50 km	Matti Raivio	4'06:50	7

== Figure skating ==
Pairs

Athletes	Points	Score	Final rank
**Ludowika Jakobsson**; **Walter Jakobsson**	18.5	10.25	2nd place, silver medalist(s)

== Military patrol ==
Athletes	Time	Shots on target	Final Time (-30s./hit)	Rank
**August Eskelinen**; **Heikki Hirvonen**; **Martti Lappalainen**; **Väinö Bremer**	4'05:40	11	4'00:10	2nd place, silver medalist(s)

== Nordic combined ==
Events:

- 18 km cross-country skiing
- normal hill ski jumping

The cross-country skiing part of this event was combined with the main medal event of cross-country skiing. Those results can be found above in this article in the cross-country skiing section. Some athletes (but not all) entered in both the cross-country skiing and Nordic combined event, their time on the 18 km was used for both events. One would expect that athletes competing at the Nordic combined event, would participate in the cross-country skiing event as well, as they would have the opportunity to win more than one medal. This was not always the case due to the maximum number of athletes (here: 4) could represent a country per event.

The ski jumping (normal hill) event was held separate from the main medal event of ski jumping, results can be found in the table below.

Athlete	Event	Ski Jumping				Cross-country			Total	
Athlete	Event	Distance 1	Distance 2	Total points	Rank	Time	Points	Rank	Points	Rank
Verner Eklöf	Individual	37.0	37.0	14.916	11	1'34.11	10.250	11	12.583	9
Sulo Jääskeläinen	Individual	41.5	41.0	16.604	6	1'42.30	6.125	19	11.365	16

== Ski jumping ==
Athlete	Event	Jump 1			Jump 2			
Athlete	Event	Distance	Points	Rank	Distance	Points	Total	Rank
Tuure Nieminen	Normal hill	42.5	16.192	14	41.0	16.333	16.263	13
Sulo Jääskeläinen	Normal hill	42.5	16.543	10	42.5	16.293	16.418	11

== Speed skating ==
Men

Event	Athlete	Race	
Event	Athlete	Time	Rank
500 m	**Clas Thunberg**	44.8	3rd place, bronze medalist(s)
500 m	Asser Wallenius	45.0	5
500 m	Julius Skutnabb	46.4	10
1500 m	**Clas Thunberg**	2:20.8	1st place, gold medalist(s)
1500 m	Julius Skutnabb	2:26.6	4
1500 m	Asser Wallenius	DNF	
5000 m	**Clas Thunberg**	8:39.0	1st place, gold medalist(s)
5000 m	**Julius Skutnabb**	8:48.4	2nd place, silver medalist(s)
5000 m	Asser Wallenius	9:12.8	10
10,000 m	**Julius Skutnabb**	18:04.8	1st place, gold medalist(s)
10,000 m	**Clas Thunberg**	18:07.8	2nd place, silver medalist(s)
10,000 m	Asser Wallenius	19:03.8	10

All-round
Distances: 500 m; 5000 m; 1500 m & 10,000 m.

Athlete	Until distance 1			Until distance 2			Until distance 3			Total		
Athlete	Points	Score	rank	Points	Score	rank	Points	Score	rank	Points	Score	rank
**Clas Thunberg**	1,5	44.80	1	2.5	96.70	1	3.5	143.63	1	5.5	198.02	1st place, gold medalist(s)
**Julius Skutnabb**	7	46.40	7	8	99.24	3	11	148.11	3	11	202.35	3rd place, bronze medalist(s)
Asser Wallenius	3	45.00	3	10	100.28	5	DNF					

== Sources ==
- M. Avé, Comité Olympique Français (ed.). Les Jeux de la VIII^{e} Olympiade Paris 1924 - Rapport Officiel (PDF) (in French). Paris: Librairie de France. Archived from the original (PDF) on 2011-05-05.
- "Olympic Medal Winners". International Olympic Committee.
- Olympic Winter Games 1924, full results by sports-reference.com
