= John Carleton (skier) =

American lawyer and Olympic skier

John P. Carleton
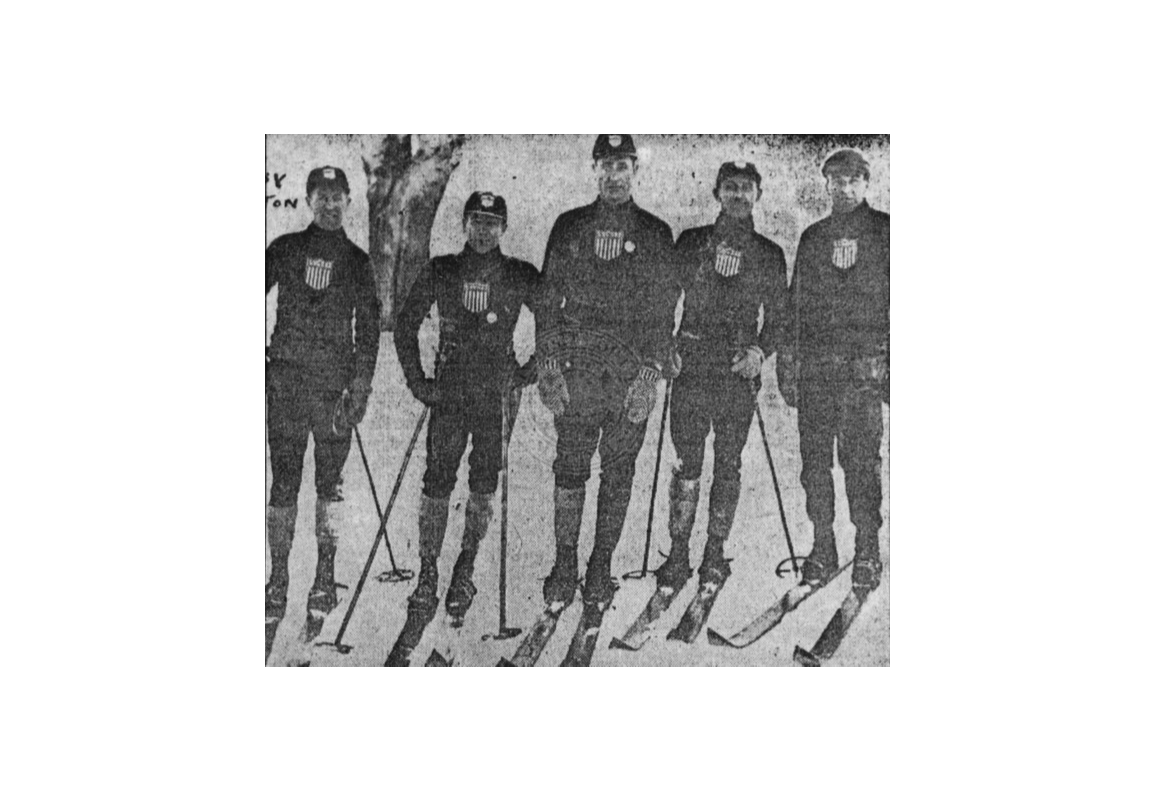
- The first U.S. Olympic ski jumping team, 1924

Personal information
- Full name: John Porter Carleton
- Born: September 13, 1899 Hanover, New Hampshire, United States
- Died: January 21, 1977 (aged 77) Manchester, New Hampshire, United States
- Education: Dartmouth College, Magdalen College of Oxford

Sport
- Sport: Nordic skiing, tennis
- Club: Dartmouth Outing Club

Achievements and titles
- Olympic finals: 1924 Winter Olympics

John Carleton (September 13, 1899– January 21, 1977) was an American lawyer and competitive skier from New Hampshire. He competed in cross-country skiing and Nordic combined at the 1924 Winter Olympics in Chamonix. He was also a pioneer of alpine skiing in the United States.

== Scholastics ==
Carleton graduated from Hanover High School, Phillips Academy in Andover, Dartmouth College and Magdalen College, Oxford.

While at Dartmouth, he was elected to Phi Beta Kappa, member of Delta Kappa Epsilon fraternity, vice-president of Palaeopitus, vice-president of the Dartmouth Outing Club and member of Cabin and Trail, and the Casque and Gauntlet senior society.

In 1922, he won a Rhodes scholarship, and graduated with a law degree from Oxford's Magdalen College in 1925.

== Sports ==
Gustav Paulsen taught Carleton to somersault on skis off a ski jump, which he first performed as an exhibition at the Dartmouth Winter Field Day in 1910.

At Dartmouth he competed on the tennis team each year, and was a 1919 New England doubles champion. Carleton was captain of the ski team, competing for three years, and was an intercollegiate ski jump champion in 1919 and 1921. He was also on the varsity football team for three years. In 1922 Carleton won the Beck trophy at Lake Placid, and set two New England ski jumping records in New Hampshire and the Vermont state championship.

As a member (and 1925 captain) of the Oxford ski team, in 1923 he took part in two Oxbridge Ski Races held in Switzerland. He competed for the U.S. in cross-country skiing and Nordic combined at the 1924 Winter Olympics.

On April 11, 1931, along with Charles Proctor, Carleton made the first ski descent of the headwall at Tuckerman Ravine.

In 1932 he competed in the first Eastern Amateur Ski Association downhill race held on Mount Moosilauke.

As Chairman of the New Hampshire Ski Trails Committee of the State Development Commission in 1933, he oversaw the planning of 40 miles of new ski trails cut by the CCC reaching across the state of New Hampshire from the Vermont line to the Maine line.

== Military service ==
- World War I U.S. Army Sergeant
- World War II U.S. Army Air Corps Captain, promoted to Major

== Profession ==
Carleton was partner in the Manchester, New Hampshire law firm of McLane, Carleton, Graf, Green & Brown and an Assistant Attorney General for New Hampshire from 1939 to 1945. He also worked as campaign manager for the Sherman Adams campaign for governor in 1946. and was an alternate delegate to the 1948 Republican National Convention from New Hampshire.

== Family ==
He married Alice Prescott Skinner on July 1, 1931, in Paris, France.

== Honors ==
- Rhodes scholar 1922
- WWII Bronze Star Medal
- National Ski Hall of Fame 1968
