= Latvia at the 1924 Winter Olympics =

- IOC code: LAT
- NOC: Latvian Olympic Committee
- Website: www.olimpiade.lv (in Latvian and English)

in Chamonix
- Competitors: 2 (men) in 2 sports
- Flag bearer: Roberts Plūme
- Medals: Gold 0 Silver 0 Bronze 0 Total 0

Winter Olympics appearances (overview)
- 1924; 1928; 1932; 1936; 1948–1988; 1992; 1994; 1998; 2002; 2006; 2010; 2014; 2018; 2022; 2026

Other related appearances
- Soviet Union (1956–1988)

Latvia participated at the inaugural 1924 Winter Olympics in Chamonix, France, held between 25 January and 5 February 1924. The country's participation in the Games was its debut appearance at the Winter Olympics. The Latvian team consisted of two athletes who competed in two sports. Roberts Plūme served as the country's flag-bearer during the opening ceremony. Latvia did not win any medal in the Games.

== Background ==
The inaugural Winter Olympics was held in Chamonix, France, between 25 January and 5 February 1924. The 1924 Winter Olympics marked Latvia's first participation in the Olympic Games. The Latvian delegation consisted of two athletes. Roberts Plūme served as the country's flag-bearer in the Parade of Nations during the opening ceremony. Latvia did not win any medal in the Games.

== Competitors ==
Latvia sent two athletes who competed in two sports at the Games.

Sport	Men	Women	Athletes
Cross-country skiing	1	0	1
Speed skating	1	0	1
Total	2	0	2

== Cross-country skiing ==
Cross-country skiing events were held on a course along the Arne River. Flag-bearer Roberts Plūme competed in two events for Latvia. He did not achieve a finish in either event.

Event	Athlete	Race	
Event	Athlete	Time	Rank
Roberts Plūme	Men's 18 km	DNF	–
Roberts Plūme	Men's 50 km	DNF	–

== Speed skating ==
Speed skating competitions were held on 26 and 27 January 1924 at the State Olympique in Chamonix. Alberts Rumba participated in five events in the competition. This was Rumba's debut appearance at the Winter Olympics. He would go on to represent Latvia in the next Winter Games in 1928. In the Games, he recorded a best place finish of 10th in the Men's 1500 m event. In the Men's all round based on the performance from the four individual events, he was ranked seventh amongst the 23 competitors.

Event	Athlete	Time	Rank
Alberts Rumba	Men's 500 m	48.8	16
Alberts Rumba	Men's 1500 m	2:32.0	10
Alberts Rumba	Men's 5000 m	9:14.4	11
Alberts Rumba	Men's 10000 m	19:14.6	11

Athlete	Event	Until Distance 1			Until Distance 2			Until Distance 3			Final		
Athlete	Event	Points	Score	Rank	Points	Score	Rank	Points	Score	Rank	Points	Score	Rank
Alberts Rumba	Men's all round	11	48.80	11	18	104.24	10	21	154.91	7	27	212.64	7
