= Valentine Bialas =

American speed skater

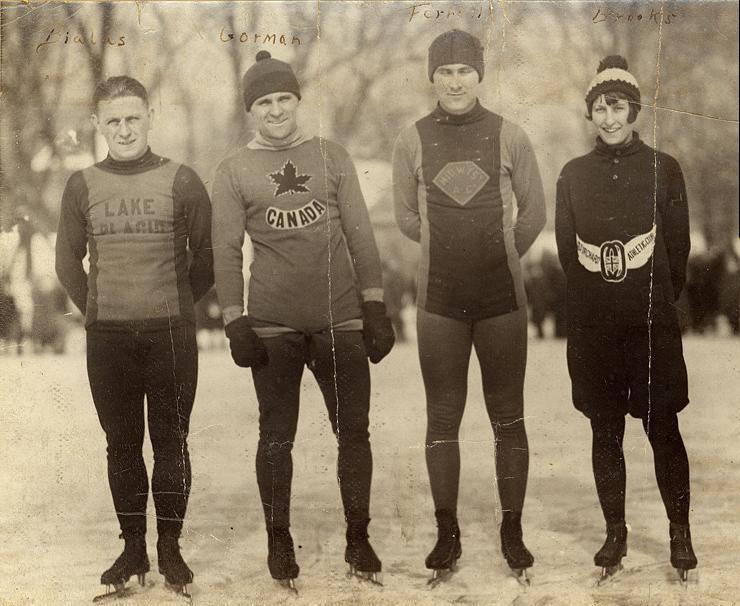
Bialas, on the far left, standing with fellow Olympic speedskaters Charles Gorman and Lela Brooks in Saint John, New Brunswick, Canada, in 1926

Valentine Bialas (January 10, 1903 in Boston, Massachusetts – March 9, 1965 in Utica, New York) was an American speed skater who competed in the 1924 Winter Olympics, in the 1928 Winter Olympics and in the 1932 Winter Olympics.

In 1924 he finished sixth in the 5000 metres event and eighth in the 10000 metres competition.

Four years later he finished sixth in the 1500 metres event as well as sixth in the 5000 metres competition, and 17th in the 500 metres competition. He also started in the abandoned 10000 metres event.

At the 1932 Olympics, he finished fifth in the 10000 metres competition.

Val also won the International Speed Skating title in Detroit in 1926, and established a world record for two miles at Lake Placid, New York, in 1929 with a time of 5:35.5.

He qualified for the 1936 Olympic team as an alternate, but could not participate in those Olympics because he was injured in an auto/train collision which occurred in an icy downpour on the way home from a skating meet. He lost his leg in the collision.

Fitted with an artificial leg, he continued to skate for recreation, play successfully in city tennis tournaments, and coach and guide young athletes, including his son John, also a speedskater and tennis player. Early morning skating sessions sometimes included shoveling snow off the frozen Barge Canal for a makeshift rink.

He was inducted into the USA Speed Skating Hall of Fame on May 11, 1963. He was inducted into the Greater Utica Hall of Fame in 1990. His profile on SpeedSkatingNews provides career race data.

The Val Bialas Ski Center is in Utica, New York, and is named in his honor.
