= Charles Gorman (speed skater) =

Canadian speed skater

Charles Ingraham Gorman
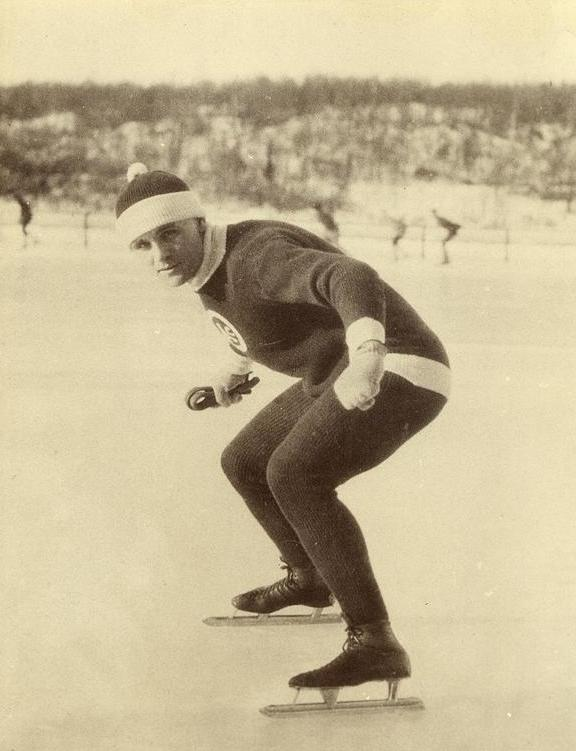
- Gorman circa 1921

Personal information
- Nickname: Charlie
- Nationality: Canadian
- Born: July 6, 1898 Saint John, New Brunswick
- Died: February 11, 1940 (aged 41) Saint John, New Brunswick

Sport
- Country: Canada
- Sport: Speed skating
- Retired: 1928

Achievements and titles
- Olympic finals: 1924 Winter Olympics; 1928 Winter Olympics
- World finals: 1926-27 - World Speed Skating Titles
- Regional finals: 1924 - North American Outdoor Title; 1926-28 - North American Indoor Title; 1927 - Mid-Atlantic Title
- National finals: 1924-26 - Canadian Outdoor Titles; 1927 - Canadian Indoor Title; 1927 - U.S. Outdoor Title
- Highest world ranking: 1st (1926-27)
- Updated on 20 March 2013

Charles Gorman (July 6, 1898 – February 11, 1940) was a Canadian speed skater who competed in the 1924 Winter Olympics and in the 1928 Winter Olympics. Gorman dominated the sport of speed skating in North America during the mid-1920s, often being referred to as the "Man with the Million Dollar Legs" and the "Human Dynamo".

== Early life ==
Gorman was born in Saint John, New Brunswick. At the age of 15, he won the Maritime speed skating title, his first championship. He served in the First World War as a Corporal in the Canadian Expeditionary Force. Although Gorman suffered a shrapnel wound in one leg during the war, he excelled at both baseball and speed skating upon his return to Canada, eventually turning down an offer from the New York Yankees in order to focus on skating.

== Career ==
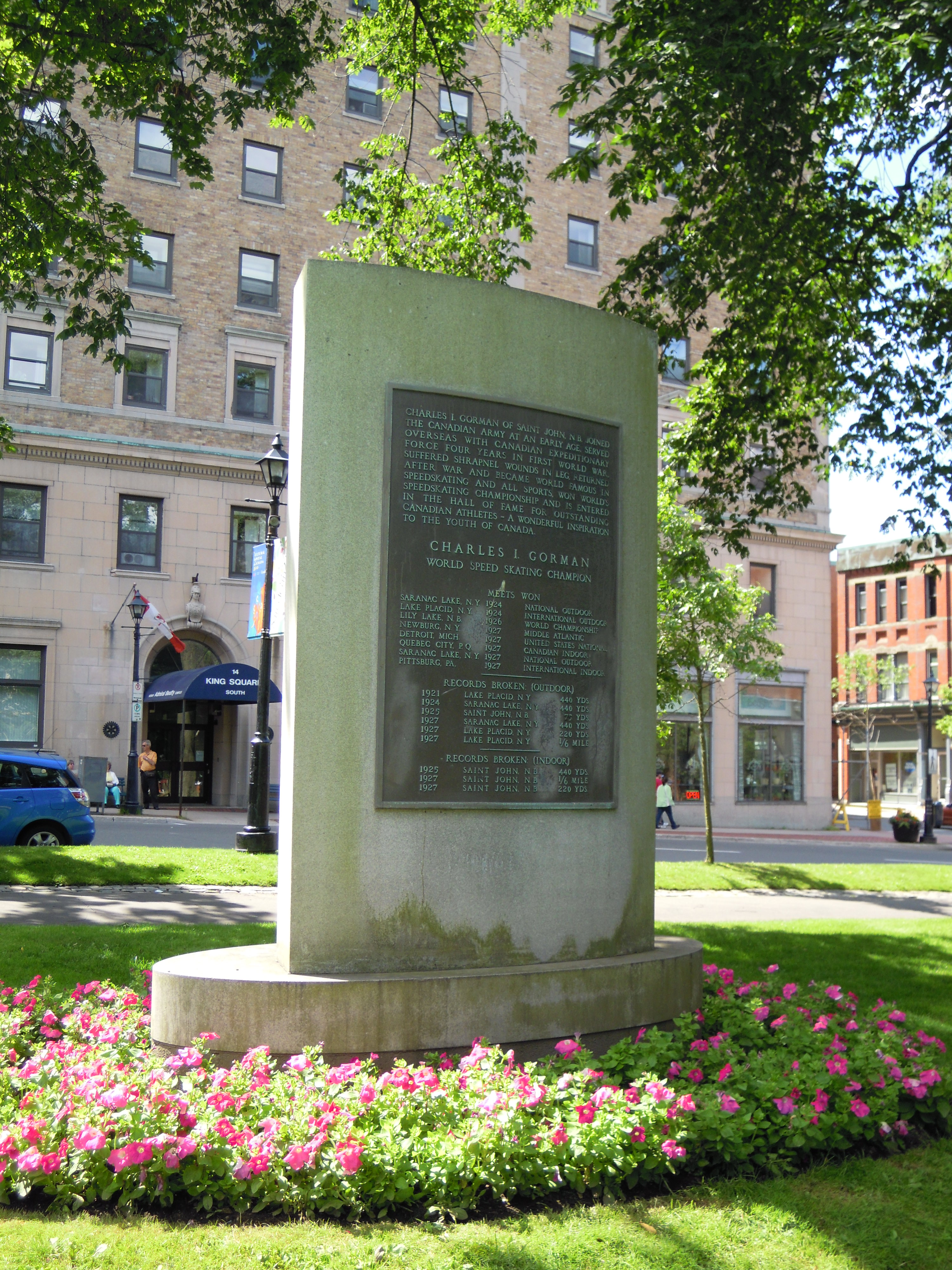
Monument to Charles Gorman in Saint John, New Brunswick

In 1924, Gorman won his first Canadian outdoor championship and his first North American outdoor title. He fared less well at the 1924 Winter Olympics, finishing seventh in the 500 metres event and eleventh in the 1500 metres competition. He also participated in the 5000 metres event but did not finish. Gorman's approach to the sport proved to be more suited to the more combative North American system, where skaters all raced against each other at once, than to the European style used at the Olympics, where skaters raced in pairs against a clock.

Gorman returned to previous form in 1926, winning both the Canadian outdoor and the North American indoor titles, and beating Olympic champion Clas Thunberg of Finland to claim the 1926 ISUA World Outdoor Speed Skating Championship. In 1927, Gorman claimed the mid-Atlantic, U.S. national outdoor, Canadian indoor championships, as well as both the international outdoor and indoor championships. Moreover, he retained his world title, and broke the world record for the 1/6 mile event.

In the 1928 Winter Olympics, Gorman again finished seventh in the 500 metres event and twelfth in the 1500 metres competition. Gorman refused to compete in the 5000 metres competition, when officials ruled that there had been no interference when a competitor fell in Gorman's path during the 500 metres event.

== Legacy ==
Gorman held seven world records when he retired in 1928. After a lengthy illness, he died in 1940. At his funeral, thousands lined the streets in Gorman's hometown of Saint John to pay their respects to the New Brunswick's first Winter Olympian. He was inducted into Canada's Sports Hall of Fame in 1955, and was inducted into the New Brunswick Sports Hall of Fame in 1970.

In Saint John, an arena and a street are named after Gorman, and there is a monument to him in King's Square park created by sculptor Claude Roussel. Fundraising efforts were undertaken in 2010 to erect a new memorial headstone at Gorman's grave in Old Cedar Hill Cemetery.
