= John Lyons (ice hockey) =

- John Lyons at the 1924 Olympics
- Born: March 31, 1900 Arlington, Massachusetts, US
- Died: January 15, 1971 (aged 70) Arlington, Massachusetts, US
- Position: Center/Defense/Right Wing/Rover
- Played for: Massachusetts Agricultural; Boston Athletic Association
- National team: United States
- Playing career: 1919–1925
Medal record
Men's ice hockey
Representing the United States
Olympic Games
Silver medal – second place	1924 Chamonix	Team competition

John Joseph "Sharky" Lyons Jr. was an American ice hockey center and defenseman who won a silver medal for the United States at the 1924 Winter Olympics.

== Playing career ==
Sharky Lyons was born and raised in Arlington, Massachusetts. After graduating from Arlington High in 1918, he began attending Massachusetts Agricultural College that fall. A star hockey player in high school, Lyons joined the varsity team as a freshman. However, due in part to the few spots available, he did not appear in any games until his junior year. When Lyons finally debuted for the Aggies, he played both Center and Rover as the team was still operating under the 7-on-7 rules. The following year MAC switched to the new 6-on-6 format, as did most other colleges. With the style so altered, Lyons played at both Defense and Right Wing and was one of the Leading player for the Aggies on both ends of the ice.

After graduating with a degree in agricultural Economics, Lyons was able to continue his playing career. As a good skater who could play seemingly any position, Lyons joined the Boston Athletic Association in 1922 just in time to help the team win the National Amateur Championship. The following October, the United States Amateur Hockey Association voted to build the roster for the upcoming Olympic games around the core of the BAA. Five players from the amateur club were included on national team, including Lyons. Sharky served as a reserve forward for the games, playing in 2 of 5 games for the US and was the only skater to not score during the tournament. Despite his limited contributions, Lyons helped the team win the silver medal, repeating their performance from 1920.

Lyons played with the BAA for another year before hanging up his skates in 1925. Afterwards, he returned to Arlington to work as a gardener and greenhouse farmer.

== Personal life ==
John Lyons was married to Thecla Augusta Kennedy and the two had three children. John died in 1971.

== Career statistics ==
=== Regular season and playoffs ===
			Regular season					Playoffs
Season	Team	League	GP	G	A	Pts	PIM	GP	G	A	Pts	PIM
1920–21	Massachusetts Agricultural	Independent	7	2	—	—	—	—	—	—	—	—
1921–22	Massachusetts Agricultural	Independent	—	—	—	—	—	—	—	—	—	—
1922–23	Boston Athletic Association	USAHA	—	—	—	—	—	—	—	—	—	—
1923–24	Boston Athletic Association	USAHA	—	—	—	—	—	—	—	—	—	—
1924–25	Boston Athletic Association	USAHA	—	—	—	—	—	—	—	—	—	—

Note: assists were not an official statistic or were recorded infrequently.

=== International ===
Year	Team	Event	GP	G	A	Pts	PIM
1924	United States	OLY	2	0	0	0	0
International totals			2	0	0	0	0
