= Harry Kaskey =

American speed skater

Harry Hubert Kaskey
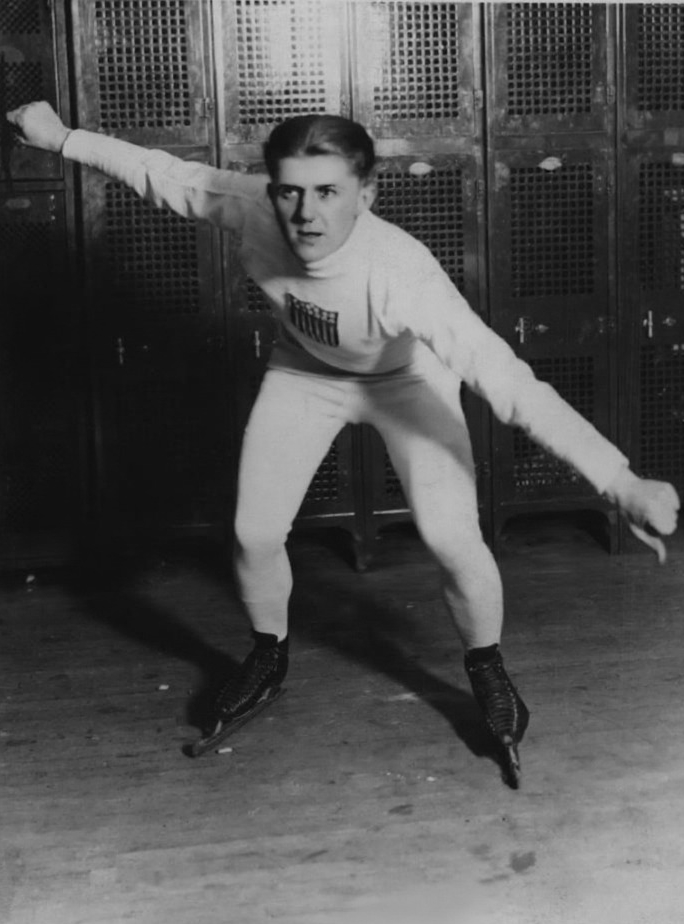
- Harry Kaskey in 1924

Personal information
- Born: September 15, 1901 Chicago, United States
- Died: August 21, 1992 (aged 90) Sarasota, Florida, United States

Sport
- Country: United States
- Sport: Speed skating

Achievements and titles
- Olympic finals: 1924 Winter Olympics

Harry Hubert Kaskey (September 15, 1901 – August 21, 1992) was an American speed skater who competed in the 1924 Winter Olympics. Along with several other tournaments.

He was born in Chicago and died in Sarasota, Florida.

In the 1924 Winter Olympics held in Chamonix, France. he finished seventh in the Speed Skating 1500 metres event, twelfth in the Speed Skating 500 metres competition, and 13th in the Speed Skating 10000 metres contest. After the 1924 Winter Olympics, He was banned from Amateur Competition, but was reinstated in 1925. But never competed afterwards until making a brief comeback in 1932.
