= Joe Moore (speed skater) =

American speed skater

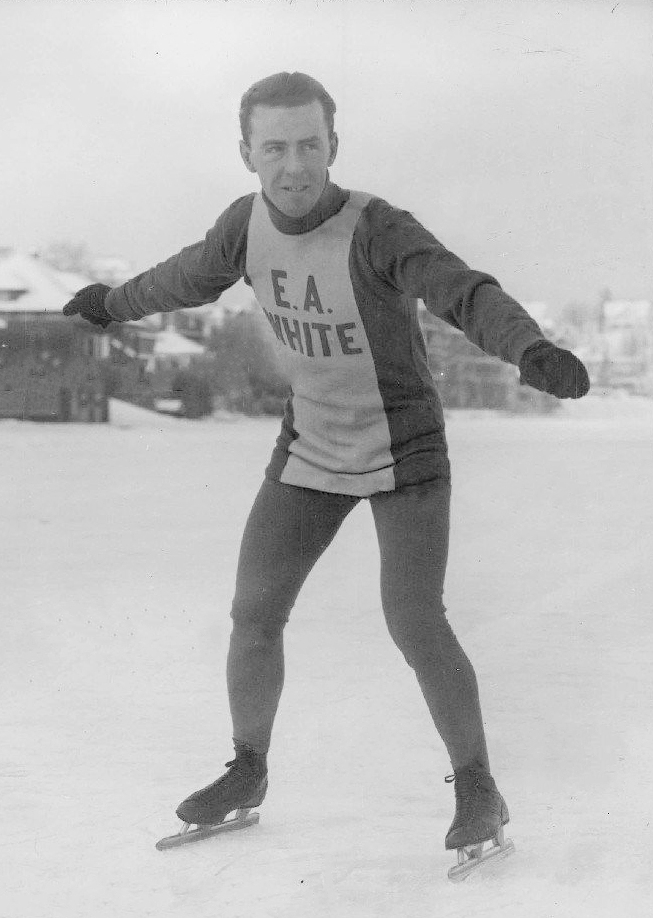
- Moore in 1929

Personal information
- Born: January 12, 1901 New York City, U.S.
- Died: April 28, 1982 (aged 81) New York City, U.S.
- Height: 170 cm (5 ft 7 in)

Sport
- Sport: Speed skating
- Club: 181st Street Ice Palace, New York

Achievements and titles
- Personal best(s): 500 m – 44.4 (1926); 1500 m – 2:31.6 (1924)

Joseph John Moore (January 12, 1901 – April 1982) was an American speed skater who competed in the 1924 Winter Olympics. He finished eighth in the 500 m and 1500 m, and twelfth in the 10000 m event.

Moore competed from 1917 to 1927, in the New York – New Jersey area, and won more than 15 major all-around titles, including the 1921 Eastern Championships and the 1927 Long Island Championships. He never won the national all-around title, finishing second in 1923, but he won the Canadian all-around title in 1922. In 1921, he was briefly banned from amateur competitions because his name was used in commercial advertisements.

Moore was the uncle of 1932 Winter Olympian Raymond Murray
