= Alberts Rumba =

Latvian speed skater

Alberts Rumba (15 October 1892 – 10 July 1962) was a Latvian speed skater who competed in the 1924 Winter Olympics.

In 1924, he finished tenth in the 1500 metres event, eleventh in the 5000 metres competition, as well as eleventh in the 10000 metres event, and 16th in the 500 metres competition. In the all-round event he finished seventh.

Four years later he finished 14th in the 1500 metres event, 15th in the 5000 metres competition, and 16th in the 500 metres competition.
