= Asser Wallenius =

Finnish speed skater

Asser Rafael Wallenius (23 July 1902 – 25 February 1971) was a Finnish speed skater and racing driver who competed in the 1924 Winter Olympics.

In 1924 he finished fifth in the 500 metres event, tenth in the 5000 metres competition, and also tenth in the 10000 metres event. He also participated in the 1500 metres event but did not finish, therefore he was also unplaced in the all-round competition.

After retiring from competition, Wallenius moved into motor racing and competed in the years just each side of World War II, which included a third placing at the Estonian Grand Prix.
