= Franciszek Bujak (skier) =

Polish cross-country skier

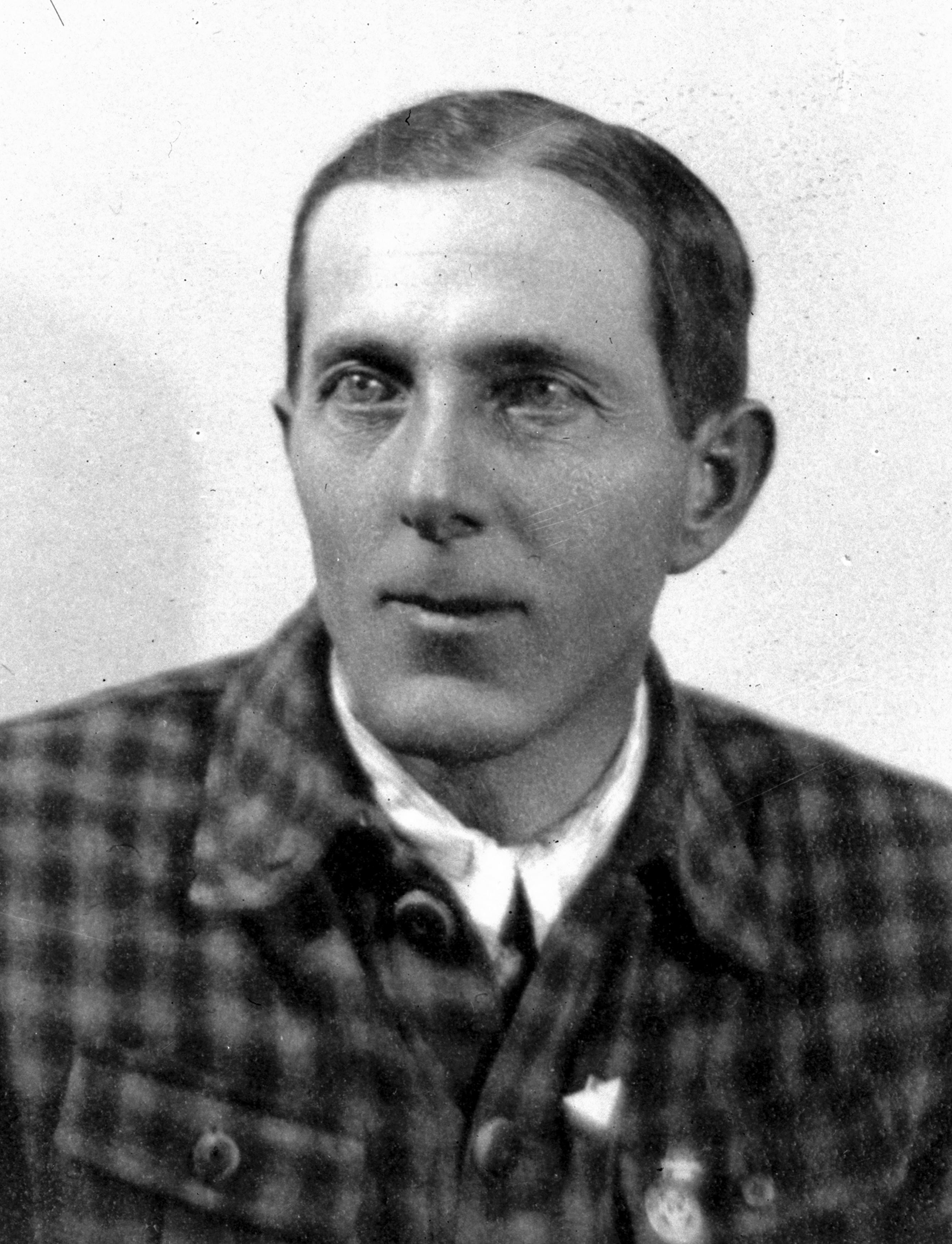

Personal information
- Nationality: Polish
- Born: 25 November 1896; Jaszczurowa, Austria-Hungary
- Died: 11 September 1975 (aged 78); Zakopane, Poland

Sport
- Sport: Cross-country skiing

Franciszek Bujak (25 November 1896 – 11 September 1975) was a Polish cross-country skier. He competed in the men's 18 kilometre event at the 1924 Winter Olympics.
