= Leon Jucewicz =

Polish speed skater

Leon Jucewicz (November 18, 1902 – January 13, 1984) was a Polish speed skater who competed in the 1924 Winter Olympics. He was born in Szweknia, now in Latvia.

In 1924 he finished 17th in the 500 metres event, 15th in the 1500 metres competition, 16th in the 5000 metres event, and 14th in the 10000 metres competition. In the all-round event he finished eighth.
