= Andrzej Krzeptowski (born 1903) =

Polish skier

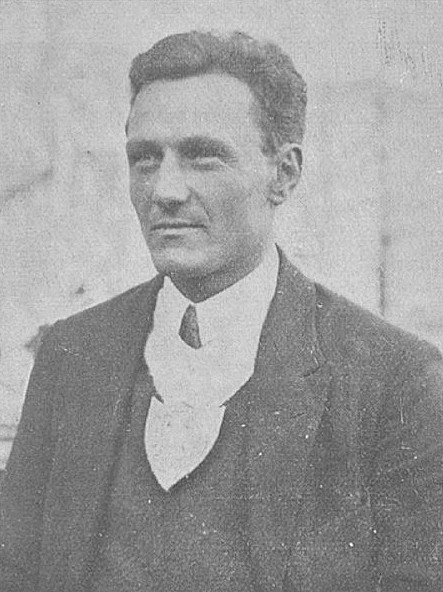
- Krzeptowski in 1928

Personal information
- Nationality: Polish
- Born: 29 July 1903; Zakopane, Austria-Hungary
- Died: 26 February 1945 (aged 41); Kraków, Poland
- Height: 172 cm (5 ft 8 in)
- Weight: 70 kg (154 lb)

Sport
- Sport: Skiing
- Event(s): Nordic combined, Ski jumping, Cross-country

Andrzej Krzeptowski (29 July 1903 – 26 February 1945) was a Polish skier. He competed for Poland at the 1924 Winter Olympics, finishing 19th in the Nordic combined event, 21st in the ski jumping event, and 28th in the 18 km cross-country skiing event. Krzeptowski also competed for Poland at the 1924 Winter Olympics, finishing 27th in the ski jumping event.

He has a cousin with the same name, Andrzej Krzeptowski (1902–1981), who competed at the 1928 Winter Olympics in cross-country skiing events.

Krzeptowski collaborated with German occupiers during World War II as a member of the Goralenvolk, running a hardware store in Zakopane. He died in Soviet custody after liberation, supposedly having taken poison.
