= Sigurd Overby =

American cross-country skier (1899–1979)

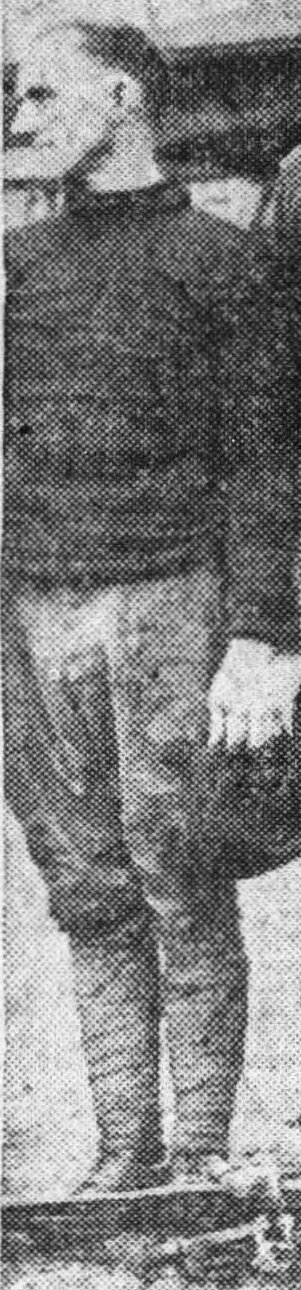
- Overby in 1924 as a member of the U. S. Olympic ski team.

Personal information
- Born: November 14, 1899 Wisconsin
- Died: April 12, 1979 (aged 79)

Sport
- Sport: Skiing

Sigurd Overby (November 14, 1899 – April 12, 1979) was an American skier from Wisconsin. He was the American champion in cross-country skiing three times, first in 1916. He competed in cross-country skiing and Nordic combined at the 1924 Winter Olympics in Chamonix. He was inducted into the U. S. Ski & Snowboard Hall of Fame in 1976.
