= Art Langley =

American ice hockey player

Olympic medal record

Men's Ice hockey
Silver medal – second place	1924 Chamonix	Team competition

John Arthur Langley (June 25, 1896 – March 5, 1967) was an American ice hockey player who competed in the 1924 Winter Olympics.

Born in Melrose, Massachusetts, he was a member of the American ice hockey team, which won the silver medal. He died in Eustis, Florida.
