= Tuure Nieminen =

Finnish ski jumper

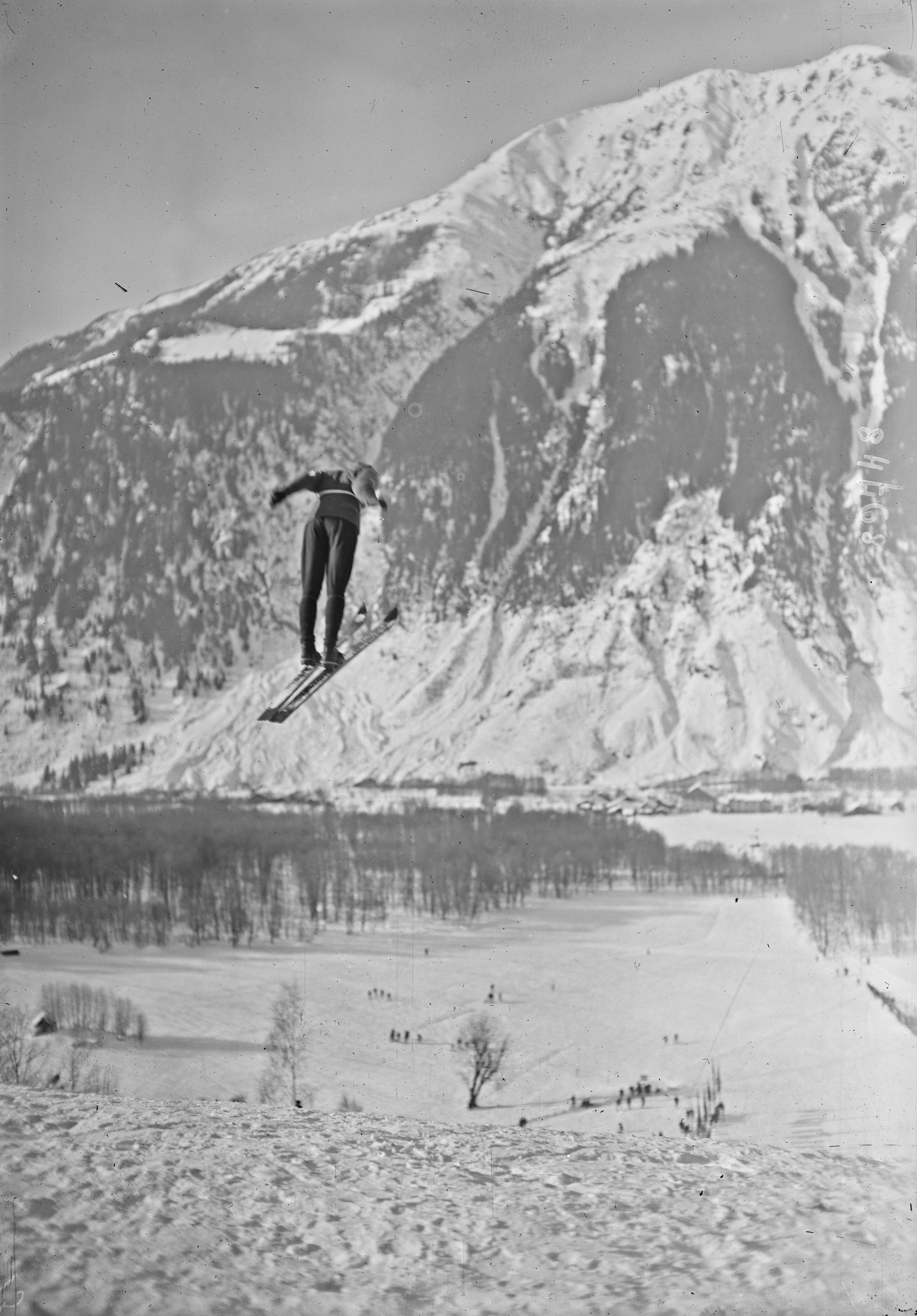
- Nieminen during the 1924 Olympics.

Personal information
- Nationality: Finnish
- Born: 19 February 1894; Helsinki, Grand Duchy of Finland
- Died: 17 October 1968 (aged 74); Helsinki, Finland

Sport
- Sport: Ski jumping

Tuure Nieminen (19 February 1894 – 17 October 1968) was a Finnish ski jumper. He was born in Helsinki. He participated at the 1924 Winter Olympics in Chamonix, where he placed 13th in ski jumping.
