= Fridtjof Paulsen =

Norwegian speed skater

Fridtjof Antonius Paulsen (20 November 1895 – 28 June 1988) was a Norwegian speed skater who competed in the 1924 Winter Olympics.

He was born and died in Oslo and represented Oslo SK. In 1924 he finished fourth in the 10000 metres event and seventh in the 5000 metres competition.
