= Richard Donovan (speed skater) =

American speed skater

Richard E. "Duke" Donovan (May 29, 1901 – May 13, 1985) was an American speed skater who competed in the 1924 Winter Olympics.

In 1924 he finished eighth in the 5000 metres event and ninth in the 10000 metres competition.

Duke Donovan was born in St. Paul, Minnesota on May 29, 1901. He went to Cretin Catholic School for boys, and graduated from high school in 1919. He began speed skating as a young child, and competed many National and World competitions, as well as, the 1924 Olympics. He held the World record for the 5000 and 10,000 metre races at one time.

In late 1923, he met Genevieve Valquette, of Endicott, NY., and they were married on March 17, 1924. On April 21, 1928, Duke and Genevieve had a son, whom they named, Richard James Donovan.

After the Olympics, Duke continued speed skating professionally in St. Paul at the Minnesota State Fair Grounds "Hippodome". He skated professionally for 7 years. He continued to speed skate with many groups in St. Paul, as well as, coach hockey for youth groups.

Duke worked as Mechanic at the Firestone Tire Company for 25 years until his retirement. His wife Genevieve worked at the Fischer Nut Company, while their son, Richard "Augie" Donovan, went to Cretin School for boys. Augie graduated from Cretin, and enlisted in the Army in 1946. After he served in Korea and Europe, Augie went into the FBI.

Duke died on May 13, 1985, of complications due to kidney failure and continued dialysis. He was 84 years old, and was survived by his wife, Genevieve, of 61 years, his son, Richard "Augie" (Shirley Drinane) Donovan, and his 6 grandchildren.
