= Nordic skiing at the 1924 Winter Olympics =

At the 1924 Winter Olympics, four Nordic skiing events were contested – two cross-country skiing events, one ski jumping event, and one Nordic combined event, all for men only.

Thorleif Haug of Norway won both cross-country skiing events, or 18 km and 50 km, along with the Nordic combined. Jacob Tullin Thams, also of Norway, won the large hill.

Nordic skiing discipline	Men's events
Cross-country skiing	• 18 km
Cross-country skiing	• 50 km
Ski jumping	• Large hill
Nordic combined	• Individual
