= Bill Steinmetz =

American speed skater

William E. Steinmetz (February 24, 1899 – May 25, 1988) was an American speed skater who competed in the 1924 Winter Olympics.

He was born and died in Chicago. Steinmetz was an electrician by trade, and after the Olympics life he became a salesman of home appliances. Later in life he settled in Lake Geneva, Wisconsin.

In 1924 he finished twelfth in the 1500 metres event, 14th in the 500 metres competition, and 14fth in the 10000 metres contest. In a Sports Illustrated interview in 1983, Steinmetz recounted the life changing experience of visiting Paris during the Olympics in Chamonix.
