= Sulo Jääskeläinen =

Finnish ski jumper

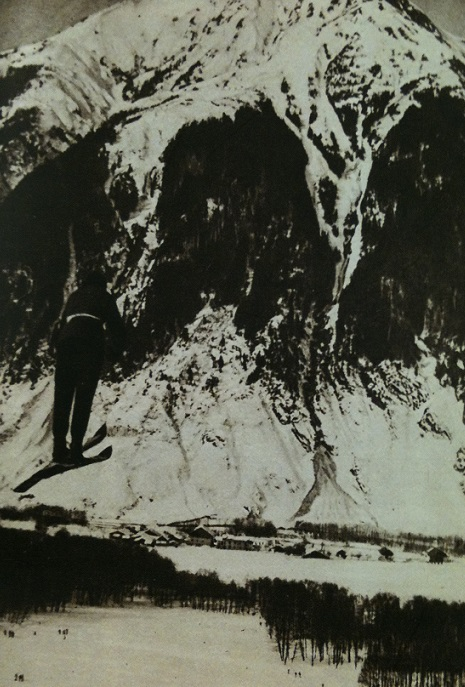
- Jääskeläinen at the 1924 Winter Olympics.

Personal information
- Born: 19 December 1890 Vyborg/Viipuri, Russian Empire
- Died: 12 January 1942 (aged 51) Kotka, Finland

Sport
- Sport: Ski jumping; Nordic combined skiing
- Club: Lahden Hiihtoseura

Sulo Jääskeläinen (19 December 1890 – 12 January 1942) was a Finnish skier. He was born in Viipuri. He participated at the 1924 Winter Olympics in Chamonix, where he placed 11th in ski jumping and 16th in Nordic combined.
