= Figure skating at the 1924 Winter Olympics – Ladies' singles =

Figure skating at the Olympics

Ladies' singles at the I Olympic Winter Games
- Dates: 28-29 January 1924
- Competitors: 8 from 6 nations

Medalists
1st place, gold medalist(s)		Herma Szabo; Austria
2nd place, silver medalist(s)		Beatrix Loughran; United States
3rd place, bronze medalist(s)		Ethel Muckelt; Great Britain

The ladies' individual skating event was held as part of the figure skating at the 1924 Winter Olympics. It was the third appearance of the event, which had previously been held at the Summer Olympics in 1908 and 1920. The competition was held on Monday, 28 January and on Tuesday, 29 January 1924. It was the only women's event at the 1924 Winter Olympics. Eight figure skaters from six nations competed.

== Results ==
Although eleven-year-old Sonja Henie finished last in this competition, she went on to win gold medals in the next three consecutive Olympic Games.

Rank	Name	Nation	CF	FS	Total points	Places
1	Herma Szabo	Austria	1	1	299.17	7
2	Beatrix Loughran	United States	2	3	279.85	14
3	Ethel Muckelt	Great Britain	3	7	250.07	26
4	Theresa Blanchard	United States	4	4	249.53	27
5	Andrée Joly	France	7	2	231.92	38
6	Cecil Smith	Canada	5	5	230.75	44
7	Kathleen Shaw	Great Britain	6	8	221.00	46
8	Sonja Henie	Norway	8	6	203.82	50

Referee:

- (Austria) Alexander von Szabo de Bucs

Judges:

- (Austria) J. Fellner
- (Finland) Walter Jakobsson
- (United Kingdom) Herbert Yglesias
- (Austria) Ernst Herz
- (France) Louis Magnus
- (France) R. Japiut
- (Belgium) Georges Wagemans
