= Axel Blomqvist =

Swedish speed skater

Axel Blomqvist (14 December 1894 – 11 December 1965) was a Swedish speed skater who competed in the 1924 Winter Olympics.

In 1924 he finished sixth in the 500 metres event, 113th in the 1500 metres competition, and 115th in the 5000 metres event.
