= Albert Tebbit =

British speed skater

Personal information
- Full name: Albert Edward Tebbit
- Nationality: British
- Born: 26 December 1871; Waterbeach, England
- Died: March 1938; Barnardiston, England

Sport
- Sport: Speed skating

Albert Edward Tebbit (26 December 1871 – March 1938) was a British speed skater. He competed in two events at the 1924 Winter Olympics.
