= Bernard Sutton =

British speed skater

Tom Sutton
Personal information
- Full name: Bernard Harold Sutton
- Nationality: British
- Born: 31 March 1892; Upwell, England
- Died: 19 April 1978 (aged 86); Huntingdon, England

Sport
- Sport: Speed skating

Bernard Harold "Tom" Sutton (31 March 1892 – 19 April 1978) was a British speed skater. He competed in two events at the 1924 Winter Olympics.
