= Christfried Burmeister =

Estonian speed skater (1898–1965)

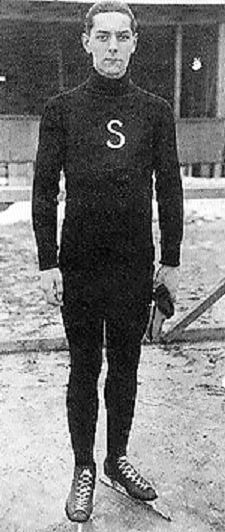
Christfried Burmeister at the 1928 Winter Olympics.

Christfried Burmeister (later Christfried Puurmeister, 26 May 1898 in Reval, Estonia – 12 July 1965 in Bradford, England) was an Estonian speed skater and bandy player who competed in the 1928 Winter Olympics.

In 1928 he finished 15th in the 500 metres event, 19th in the 1500 metres event and 24th in the 5000 metres competition.

He was also sent to take part of the speed skating event of the 1924 Winter Olympics in Chamonix but later withdrawn. The message about his withdrawal was not sent by Estonian sports officials to the Olympics organizers so Estonian flag was still represented at the opening ceremony.
