= Eric Blomgren =

Swedish speed skater

Eric N. Blomgren (16 March 1893 – 3 February 1971) was a Swedish speed skater who competed in the 1924 Winter Olympics.

In 1924 he finished eleventh in the 500 metres event and twelfth in the 5000 metres event.
