= Clas Thunberg =

Finnish speed skater

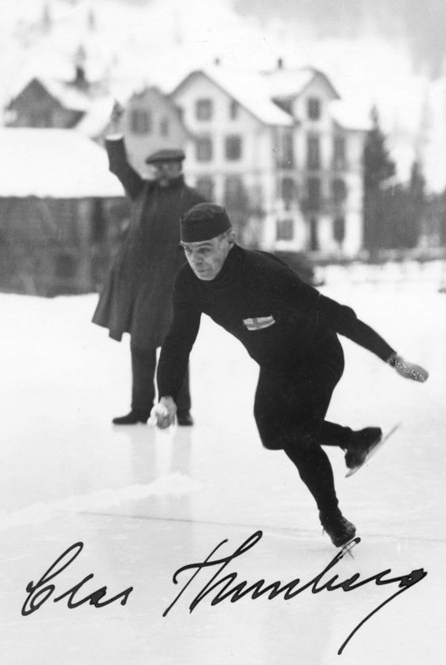

Personal information
- Born: 5 April 1893 Helsinki, Finland
- Died: 28 April 1973 (aged 80) Helsinki, Finland
- Height: 1.67 m (5 ft 6 in)
- Weight: 67 kg (148 lb)

Sport
- Country: Finland
- Sport: Speed skating
Medal record
Men's speed skating
Representing Finland
Olympic Games
Gold medal – first place	1924 Chamonix	1500 m
Gold medal – first place	1924 Chamonix	5000 m
Gold medal – first place	1924 Chamonix	Allround
Silver medal – second place	1924 Chamonix	10000 m
Bronze medal – third place	1924 Chamonix	500 m
Gold medal – first place	1928 St. Moritz	500 m
Gold medal – first place	1928 St. Moritz	1500 m
World Allround Championships
Bronze medal – third place	1922 Kristiania	Allround
Gold medal – first place	1923 Stockholm	Allround
Gold medal – first place	1925 Oslo	Allround
Silver medal – second place	1927 Tampere	Allround
Gold medal – first place	1928 Davos	Allround
Gold medal – first place	1929 Oslo	Allround
Gold medal – first place	1931 Helsinki	Allround
European Championships
Gold medal – first place	1922 Helsinki	Allround
Silver medal – second place	1923 Hamar	Allround
Silver medal – second place	1924 Kristiania	Allround
Silver medal – second place	1927 Stockholm	Allround
Gold medal – first place	1928 Oslo	Allround
Silver medal – second place	1929 Davos	Allround
Gold medal – first place	1931 Stockholm	Allround
Gold medal – first place	1932 Davos	Allround

Arnold Clas ("Classe") Robert Thunberg (5 April 1893 – 28 April 1973) was a Finnish speed skater who won five Olympic gold medals – three at the inaugural Winter Olympics held in Chamonix in 1924 (along with a silver and a bronze medal) and two at the 1928 Winter Olympics held in St. Moritz. He was the most successful athlete at both of these Winter Olympics, sharing the honour for 1928 Winter Olympics with Johan Grøttumsbraaten of Norway. No other athlete ever won such a high fraction of all Olympic events at a single Games. He was born and died in Helsinki.

== Short biography ==
Thunberg began with speed skating rather late, at the age of 18, having led a somewhat rowdy life as a compulsive smoker and drinker before he concentrated fully on his sport. However, from the age of 28 – when he turned up at his first European Allround Championships – and for the following ten years, he was by far the most-winning skater.

Thunberg's greatest strengths were the shortest distances, the 500 through 5000 metres. He never won an international 10000 metre event, although he did win a silver medal on the 10000 metres at the 1924 Winter Olympics – beaten by three seconds by compatriot Julius Skutnabb. Thunberg won three gold medals at the 1924 Olympics – the allround event, the 1500 metres and the 5000 metres. He remains the only person to have won an Olympic gold medal in allround speed skating, as despite the status of allround as the premier skating event, at least up until the 1990s, the event was abolished in the Olympics from 1928 onwards.

Thunberg won five World Allround Championships titles from 1923 to 1931, and also four European Allround Championships titles. He also took two more gold medals at the 1928 Winter Olympics, to end with five, and these two medals made him the oldest Olympic Speed Skating Champion, at the age of 34. However, despite his amazing run, he was occasionally vulnerable on the long distances. If his 500 and 1,500 metre events did not go exactly according to plan, then he could be beaten – as shown in the 1927 season when the 22-year-old Bernt Evensen pipped him to both the World and European title. Evensen, however, could never string together the long run of victories that Thunberg ended up with.

Despite his amazing career record, Thunberg never reached the top of Adelskalender – a statistical invention which ranks skaters according to their personal bests and then converts them into allround performances, using a table. Oscar Mathisen's personal bests on the three longest distances were simply too good for Thunberg to match. However, Mathisen – who was born five years before Thunberg – turned professional during World War I, meaning that the two never met in an ISU-sanctioned event.

== Record ==
=== World records ===
Over the course of his career, Thunberg skated four world records:

Distance	Time	Date	Location
500 m	42.8	19 January 1929	Eisstadion Davos, Davos
1000 m	1:28.4	11 January 1930	Eisstadion Davos, Davos
500 m	42.6	13 January 1931	Badrutts Park, St. Moritz
3000 m	5:19.2	8 January 1932	Eisstadion Davos, Davos

Source: SpeedSkatingStats.com

=== Personal records ===
Personal records
Men's speed skating
Event	Result	Date	Location	Notes
500 m	42.6	13 January 1931	Badrutts Park, St. Moritz	World record until beaten by Hans Engnestangen on 21 January 1933.
1000 m	1:27.4	4 March 1931	Bislett Stadion, Oslo	
1500 m	2:18.1	11 January 1930	Eisstadion Davos, Davos	
3000 m	5:00.6	12 February 1933	Eisstadion Davos, Davos	
5000 m	8:32.6	4 February 1928	Eisstadion Davos, Davos	
10000 m	17:34.8	5 February 1928	Eisstadion Davos, Davos	

Note that Thunberg's personal record on the 3000 m was not recognised as an official world record.

Thunberg has an Adelskalender score of 192.633 points. His highest ranking on the Adelskalender was a second place.

== Medals ==
An overview of medals won by Thunberg at important championships he participated in, listing the years in which he won each:

Championships	Gold medal	Silver medal	Bronze medal
Winter Olympics	1924 (1500 m); 1924 (5000 m); 1924 (Allround); 1928 (500 m); 1928 (1500 m)	1924 (10000 m)	1924 (500 m)
World Allround	1923; 1925; 1928; 1929; 1931	1927	1922
European Allround	1922; 1928; 1931; 1932	1923; 1924; 1927; 1929	–
Finnish Allround	1920; 1922; 1924; 1927; 1928	1921	1916

Source: SpeedSkatingStats.com

== See also ==
- List of multiple Olympic gold medalists

Records
Preceded by Himself with (Norway) Ivar Ballangrud	Athlete with the most medals at Winter Olympics; 2 February 1964 – 5 February 1964; With: Ivar Ballangrud; Sixten Jernberg	Succeeded by (Sweden) Sixten Jernberg
Preceded by Himself	Athlete with the most medals at Winter Olympics; 14 February 1936 – 2 February 1964; With: Ivar Ballangrud	Succeeded by Himself with (Norway) Ivar Ballangrud and (Sweden) Sixten Jernberg
Preceded by Himself with (Norway) Roald Larsen	Athlete with the most medals at Winter Olympics; 14 February 1928 – 14 February 1936	Succeeded by Himself with (Norway) Ivar Ballangrud
Preceded by Himself with (United States) Charles Jewtraw, (Norway) Oskar Olsen and (Norway) Roald Larsen	Athlete with the most medals at Winter Olympics; 26 January 1924 – 14 February 1928; With: Roald Larsen	Succeeded by Himself
Preceded by First medal	Athlete with the most medals at Winter Olympics; 26 January 1924 – 26 January 1924; With: Charles Jewtraw; Oskar Olsen; Roald Larsen	Succeeded by Himself with (Norway) Roald Larsen
