= Georges de Wilde =

French speed skater (1900–1996)

Personal information
- Nationality: French
- Born: 25 November 1900; Paris, France
- Died: 6 February 1996 (aged 95); Paris, France

Sport
- Sport: Speed skating

Georges de Wilde (25 November 1900 – 6 February 1996) was a French speed skater. He competed in five events at the 1924 Winter Olympics.
