= Fred Dix =

British speed skater

Personal information
- Full name: Frederick William Dix
- Nationality: British
- Born: June 1883; Cley next the Sea, England
- Died: 18 February 1966; Totnes, England
- Height: 178 cm (5 ft 10 in)

Sport
- Sport: Speed skating

Frederick William Dix (June 1883 – 18 February 1966) was a British speed skater. He competed at the 1924 Winter Olympics and the 1928 Winter Olympics.
