= Gaston Van Haezebrouck =

Belgian speed skater

Personal information
- Full name: Gaston Casper Van Haezebrouck
- Nationality: Belgian
- Born: 6 December 1904; Ingelmunster, Belgium
- Died: 10 April 1989 (aged 84); Ventura County, California

Sport
- Sport: Speed skating

Gaston Casper Van Haezebrouck (6 December 1904 – 10 April 1989) was a Belgian speed skater. He competed in four events at the 1924 Winter Olympics.

Van Haezebrouck's family immigrated to Michigan in 1913, and he became a U.S. citizen in 1930. He died in California in 1989.
