= Charles Jewtraw =

American speed skater (1900–1996)

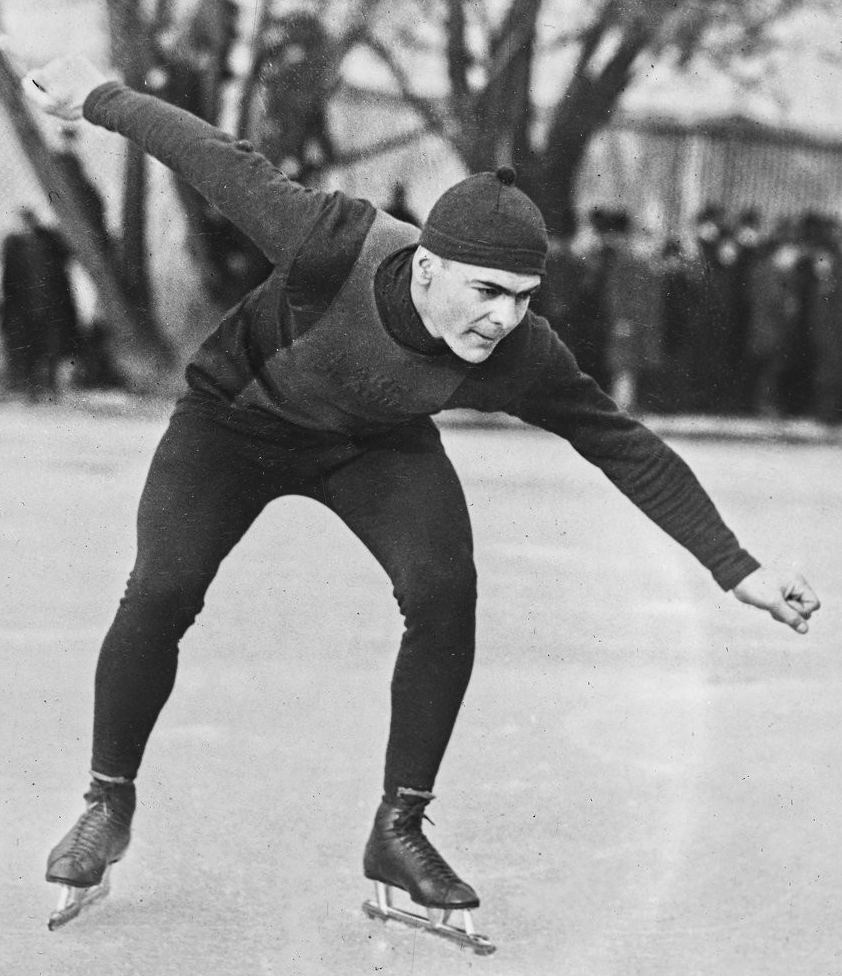
- Charles Jewtraw in 1921

Personal information
- Born: May 5, 1900 Clinton County, New York, United States
- Died: January 26, 1996 (aged 95) Palm Beach, Florida, United States
- Height: 176 cm (5 ft 9 in)

Sport
- Sport: Speed skating
- Club: Lake Placid Speed Skating Club

Achievements and titles
- Personal bests: 500 m – 44.0 (1924); 1500 m – 2:31.6 (1924); 5000 m – 9:27.0 (1924)
Medal record
Representing the United States
Olympic Games
| Gold medal – first place | 1924 Chamonix | 500 m |

Charles Jewtraw (May 5, 1900 – January 26, 1996) was an American speed skater, who won the first gold medal (in the 500 m) at the first Winter Olympics in 1924; he finished eighth in the 1500 m and 13th in the 5000 m events. Jewtraw won national titles in 1921 and 1923 and held the national record in 100 yards at 9.4 seconds. After the 1924 Games he retired from competitions and moved to New York, where he became a representative for the Spalding Sporting Goods Company.

Jewtraw moved to Palm Beach, Florida, where he died in January 1996 at 95 years of age. He was married to Natalie, who died in November 1994.

Jewtraw's gold medal is now located in the Museum of American History at the Smithsonian Institution in Washington.

Records
| Preceded by First medal | Athlete with the most medals at Winter Olympics; January 26, 1924 – January 26, 1924; With: Oskar Olsen; Roald Larsen; Clas Thunberg | Succeeded by (Finland) Clas Thunberg and (Norway) Roald Larsen |
