= André Gegout =

French speed skater (1904–1976)

Personal information
- Nationality: French
- Born: 9 February 1904; Gérardmer, France
- Died: 10 February 1976 (aged 72); Gérardmer, France

Sport
- Sport: Speed skating

André Gegout (9 February 1904 – 10 February 1976) was a French speed skater. He competed in five events at the 1924 Winter Olympics.
