= Marcel Moens =

Belgian speed skater

Personal information
- Nationality: Belgian
- Born: 1 February 1892
- Died: 12 June 1964 (aged 72)

Sport
- Sport: Speed skating

Marcel Moens (5 May 1892 – 12 June 1964) was a Belgian speed skater. He competed in four events at the 1924 Winter Olympics.
