= Cyril Horn =

British speed skater

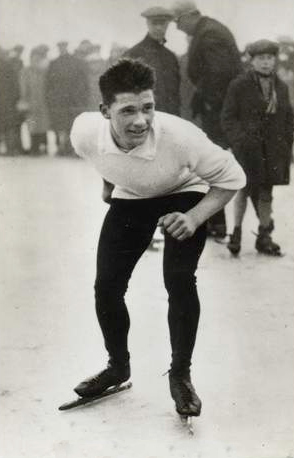

Personal information
- Born: 7 October 1904 Upwell, Norfolk, England
- Died: 7 February 1987 (aged 82) Outwell, Norfolk, England

Sport
- Sport: Speed skating
- Event: 500–10000 m

Achievements and titles
- Personal best(s): 500 m – 54.9 (1928); 1500 m – 2:40.0 (1928); 5000 m – 9:32.0 (1928)
Medal record
British National Individual Sprint Championships
Gold medal – first place	1937 Herne Hill	cycling 1,000m sprint

Cyril Walter Horn (7 October 1904 – 7 February 1987) was an English speed skater and cyclist. He competed in the 500–5000 m events at the 1924 and 1928 Winter Olympics with the best result of 23rd place in the 5000 m in 1928.

== Biography ==
Horn was born to a blacksmith in a family of six siblings. Among them two became national champions: Cyril in speed skating and cycling, and his younger brother Dennis in cycling. At the age of 12 Cyril started working with his father, making horseshoes for the British Army, and later, in the early 1920s took up skating and cycling. In 1944–45 he bought a small farm in Outwell.

Cyril was the British champion in track cycling at the British National Individual Sprint Championships in 1937.
