= Norway at the 1924 Winter Olympics =

- IOC code: NOR
- NOC: Norwegian National Federation of Sports

in Chamonix
- Competitors: 14 (13 men, 1 woman) in 5 sports
- Flag bearer: Harald Strøm (Speed skating)
- Medals Ranked 1st: Gold 4 Silver 7 Bronze 6 Total 17

Winter Olympics appearances (overview)
- 1924; 1928; 1932; 1936; 1948; 1952; 1956; 1960; 1964; 1968; 1972; 1976; 1980; 1984; 1988; 1992; 1994; 1998; 2002; 2006; 2010; 2014; 2018; 2022; 2026

Norway competed at the 1924 Winter Olympics in Chamonix, France.

== Medalists ==
Medal	Name	Sport	Event
Gold	Thorleif Haug	Cross-country skiing	Men's 18 km
Gold	Thorleif Haug	Cross-country skiing	Men's 50 km
Gold	Thorleif Haug	Nordic Combined	Men's individual
Gold	Jacob Tullin Thams	Ski jumping	Men's normal hill
Silver	Johan Grøttumsbraaten	Cross-country skiing	Men's 18 km
Silver	Thoralf Strømstad	Cross-country skiing	Men's 50 km
Silver	Thoralf Strømstad	Nordic combined	Men's individual
Silver	Narve Bonna	Ski jumping	Men's normal hill
Silver	Oskar Olsen	Speed skating	Men's 500m
Silver	Roald Larsen	Speed skating	Men's 1500m
Silver	Roald Larsen	Speed skating	Men's all-round
Bronze	Johan Grøttumsbraaten	Cross-country skiing	Men's 50 km
Bronze	Johan Grøttumsbraaten	Nordic combined	Men's individual
Bronze	Roald Larsen	Speed skating	Men's 500m
Bronze	Sigurd Moen	Speed skating	Men's 1500m
Bronze	Roald Larsen	Speed skating	Men's 5000m
Bronze	Roald Larsen	Speed skating	Men's 10,000m

== Cross-country skiing ==
Men

Event	Athlete	Race	
Event	Athlete	Time	Rank
18 km	Einar Landvik	1'17:27.4	5
18 km	Jon Mårdalen	1'16:56.8	4
18 km	Johan Grøttumsbraaten	1'15:51.0	2nd place, silver medalist(s)
18 km	Thorleif Haug	1'14:31.4	1st place, gold medalist(s)
50 km	Jon Mårdalen	3'49:48	4
50 km	Johan Grøttumsbraaten	3'47:46	3rd place, bronze medalist(s)
50 km	Thoralf Strømstad	3'46:23	2nd place, silver medalist(s)
50 km	Thorleif Haug	3'44:32	1st place, gold medalist(s)

== Figure skating ==
Women

Athlete	Event	CF	FS	Points	Places	Final rank
Sonja Henie	Ladies' singles	8	6	203.82	50	8

== Nordic combined ==
Events:

- 18 km cross-country skiing
- normal hill ski jumping

The cross-country skiing part of this event was combined with the main medal event of cross-country skiing. Those results can be found above in this article in the cross-country skiing section. Some athletes (but not all) entered in both the cross-country skiing and Nordic combined event, their time on the 18 km was used for both events. One would expect that athletes competing at the Nordic combined event, would participate in the cross-country skiing event as well, as they would have the opportunity to win more than one medal. This was not always the case due to the maximum number of athletes (here: 4) could represent a country per event.

The ski jumping (normal hill) event was held separate from the main medal event of ski jumping, results can be found in the table below.

Athlete	Event	Ski Jumping				Cross-country			Total	
Athlete	Event	Distance 1	Distance 2	Total points	Rank	Time	Points	Rank	Points	Rank
Johan Grøttumsbraaten	Individual	44.5	39.5	16.333	8	1'15:51	19.375	2	17.854	3rd place, bronze medalist(s)
Harald Økern	Individual	44.5	47.0	17.395	3	1'20:30	17.125	4	17.260	4
Thoralf Strømstad	Individual	46.0	45.5	17.687	2	1'17:03	18.750	3	18.219	2nd place, silver medalist(s)
Thorleif Haug	Individual	42.5	44.0	17.812	1	1'14:31	20.000	1	18.906	1st place, gold medalist(s)

== Ski jumping ==
Athlete	Event	Jump 1			Jump 2			
Athlete	Event	Distance	Points	Rank	Distance	Points	Total	Rank
Einar Landvik	Normal hill	42.0	17.167	5	44.5	17.877	17.522	5
Thorleif Haug	Normal hill	49.0	17.750	4	50.0	17.875	17.813	4
Narve Bonna	Normal hill	47.5	18.375	2	49.0	19.000	18.688	2nd place, silver medalist(s)
Jacob Tullin Thams	Normal hill	49.0	18.793	1	49.0	19.127	18.960	1st place, gold medalist(s)

== Speed skating ==
Men

Event	Athlete	Race	
Event	Athlete	Time	Rank
500 m	Oskar Olsen	44.2	2nd place, silver medalist(s)
500 m	Roald Larsen	44.8	3rd place, bronze medalist(s)
500 m	Harald Strøm	45.6	8
500 m	Sigurd Moen	47.2	13
1500 m	Roald Larsen	2:22.0	2nd place, silver medalist(s)
1500 m	Sigurd Moen	2:25.6	3rd place, bronze medalist(s)
1500 m	Harald Strøm	2:29.0	5
1500 m	Oskar Olsen	2:29.2	6
5000 m	Roald Larsen	8:50.2	3rd place, bronze medalist(s)
5000 m	Sigurd Moen	8:51.0	4
5000 m	Harald Strøm	8:54.6	5
5000 m	Fridtjof Paulsen	8:59.0	7
10,000 m	Roald Larsen	18:12.2	3rd place, bronze medalist(s)
10,000 m	Fridtjof Paulsen	18:13.0	4
10,000 m	Harald Strøm	18:18.6	5
10,000 m	Sigurd Moen	18:19.0	6

All-round
Distances: 500m; 5000m; 1500m & 10,000m.

Athlete	Until distance 1			Until distance 2			Until distance 3			Total		
Athlete	Points	Score	rank	Points	Score	rank	Points	Score	rank	Points	Score	rank
Roald Larsen	1,5	44.80	1	4.5	97.82	2	6.5	145.15	2	9.5	199.76	2nd place, silver medalist(s)
Harald Strøm	6	45.60	6	10	99.06	4	14	148.73	5	17	203.66	4
Sigurd Moen	9	47.20	9	12	100.30	6	13	148.83	4	17	203.78	5
