= Poland at the 1924 Winter Olympics =

- IOC code: POL
- NOC: Polish Olympic Committee
- Website: www.pkol.pl (in Polish)

in Chamonix
- Competitors: 8 (men) in 5 sports
- Flag bearer: Kazimierz Smogorzewski
- Medals: Gold 0 Silver 0 Bronze 0 Total 0

Winter Olympics appearances (overview)
- 1924; 1928; 1932; 1936; 1948; 1952; 1956; 1960; 1964; 1968; 1972; 1976; 1980; 1984; 1988; 1992; 1994; 1998; 2002; 2006; 2010; 2014; 2018; 2022; 2026

Poland competed at the 1924 Winter Olympics in Chamonix, France.

== Cross-country skiing ==
Men

Event	Athlete	Race	
Event	Athlete	Time	Rank
18 km	Andrzej Krzeptowski	1'43:02.8	28
18 km	Franciszek Bujak	1'42:13.0	27
50 km	Szczepan Witkowski	6'25:58	21

== Military patrol ==
Athletes	Time	Shots on target	Final Time (-30s./hit)	Rank
Stanisław Chrobak; Stanisław Kądziołka; Szczepan Witkowski; Zbigniew Wóycicki	DNF	–	–	–

== Nordic combined ==
Events:

- 18 km cross-country skiing
- normal hill ski jumping

The cross-country skiing part of this event was combined with the main medal event of cross-country skiing. Those results can be found above in this article in the cross-country skiing section. Some athletes (but not all) entered in both the cross-country skiing and Nordic combined event, their time on the 18 km was used for both events. One would expect that athletes competing at the Nordic combined event, would participate in the cross-country skiing event as well, as they would have the opportunity to win more than one medal. This was not always the case due to the maximum number of athletes (here: 4) could represent a country per event.

The ski jumping (normal hill) event was held separate from the main medal event of ski jumping, results can be found in the table below.

Athlete	Event	Ski Jumping				Cross-country			Total	
Athlete	Event	Distance 1	Distance 2	Total points	Rank	Time	Points	Rank	Points	Rank
Andrzej Krzeptowski	Individual	32.5	33.0	13.312	17	1'43:02	5.750	20	9.531	19
Franciszek Bujak	Individual	–	–	–	–	1'42:13	6.250	18	DNF	–

== Ski jumping ==
Athlete	Event	Jump 1			Jump 2			
Athlete	Event	Distance	Points	Rank	Distance	Points	Total	Rank
Andrzej Krzeptowski	Normal hill	33.0	12.750	21	32.0	12.167	12.458	21

== Speed skating ==
Men

Event	Athlete	Race	
Event	Athlete	Time	Rank
500 m	Leon Jucewicz	49.6	17
1500 m	Leon Jucewicz	2:42.6	15
5000 m	Leon Jucewicz	10:05.6	16
10,000 m	Leon Jucewicz	20:40.8	14

All-round
Distances: 500m; 5000m; 1500m & 10,000m.

Athlete	Until distance 1			Until distance 2			Until distance 3			Total		
Athlete	Points	Score	rank	Points	Score	rank	Points	Score	rank	Points	Score	rank
Leon Jucewicz	12	49.60	12	22	110.16	11	27	164.36	9	32	226.40	8
