= Sigurd Moen =

Norwegian speed skater

Personal information
- Nationality: Norwegian
- Born: 31 October 1897 Krødsherad
- Died: 6 October 1967 (aged 69) Drammen

Sport
- Sport: Speed skating
Medal record
Representing Norway
Men's Speed skating
Olympic Games
Bronze medal – third place	1924 Chamonix	1500 m

Sigurd Olsen Moen (31 October 1897 – 6 October 1967) was a Norwegian speed skater and Olympic medalist. He was born in Krødsherad, and represented the club Drammens SK. He won a bronze medal in 1500m at the 1924 Winter Olympics in Chamonix.
