= Léonhard Quaglia =

French sportsman (1896–1961)

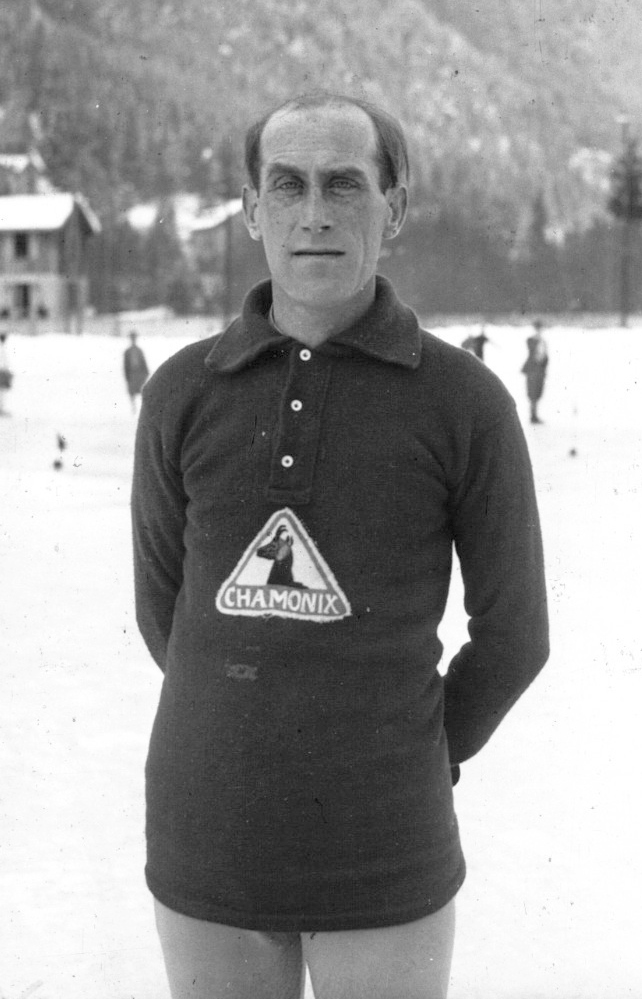
- Quaglia in 1928

Personal information
- Born: 4 January 1896 Cluses, France
- Died: 5 March 1961 (aged 65)
- Height: 1.73 m (5 ft 8 in)

Sport
- Sport: Speed skating, ice hockey
- Club: Chamonix HC

Achievements and titles
- Personal bests: 500 m – 48.4 (1924); 1500 m – 2:37.0 (1924); 5000 m – 9:07.0 (1928); 10000 m – 18:25.0 (1924)
Medal record
Representing France
Ice hockey
European Championships
Silver medal – second place	1923 Antwerp	Team
Gold medal – first place	1924 Milan	Team

Léonhard Giotti "Léon" Quaglia (4 January 1896 – 5 March 1961) was a French ice hockey player and speed skater.

== Career ==
Quaglia played for the France men's national ice hockey team at the 1920 Summer Olympics in Antwerp, the 1924 Winter Olympics in Chamonix, and the 1928 Winter Olympics in St. Moritz. He won a silver medal at the 1923 European Championship and was also the tournament's top scorer, finishing with 10 goals. At the 1924 European Championship, he won a gold medal with France and scored the game-winning goal against Sweden in the final.

At the club level, he won the French Championship with Chamonix Hockey Club in 1923 and 1930. In 1925 he won the Italian Championship with Hockey Club Milano. He was inducted into the French Ice Hockey Hall of Fame in 2010.

Quaglia also competed as a speed skater at the Winter Olympics in 1924 and 1928, with the best result of sixth place all-around in 1924. The Trophée Léon Quaglia, a short-track speed skating event, is held annually in Chamonix in his honour.
