= Stade Olympique de Chamonix =

Sports venue in Chamonix, France

Coordinates: 45°55′36″N 6°52′26″E

Chamonix Olympic Stadium
- Stade Olympique de Chamonix
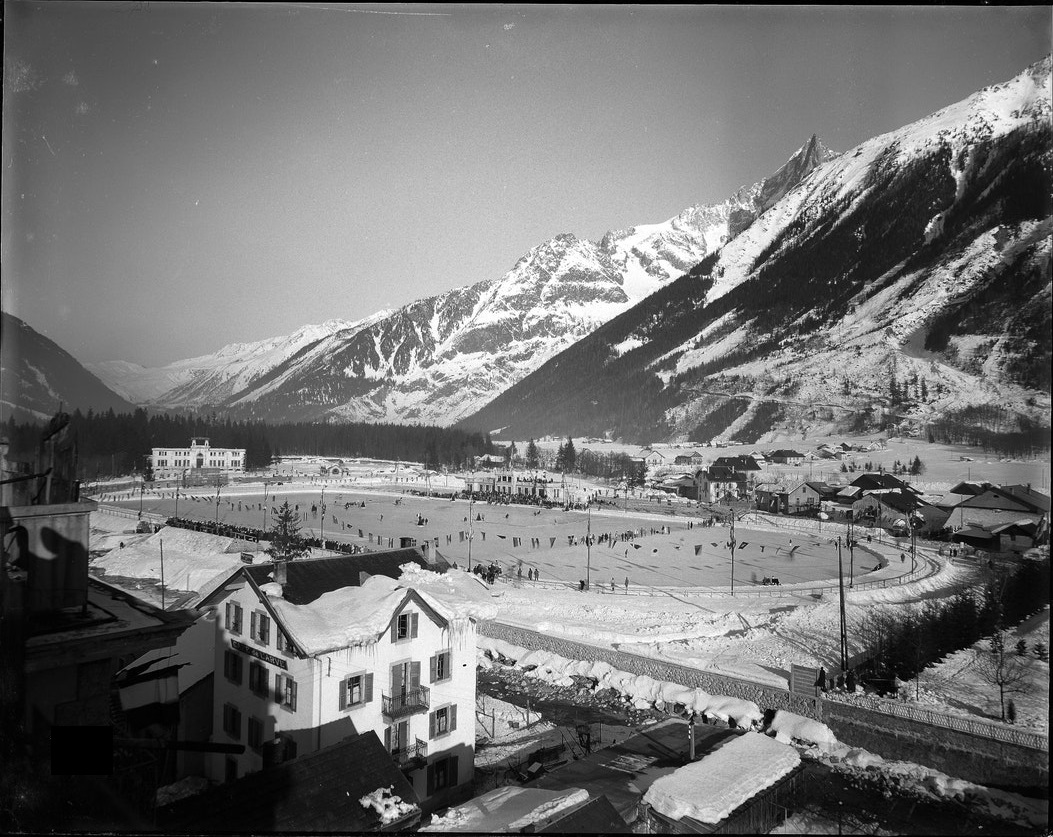
- Interactive map of Chamonix Olympic Stadium
- Location: Chamonix, France
- Capacity: 45,000
- Surface: Grass

Construction
- Opened: September 11, 1923

Stade Olympique de Chamonix is an equestrian stadium in Chamonix, France. It hosted the opening and closing ceremonies to the 1924 Winter Olympics along with cross-country skiing, curling, figure skating, ice hockey, military patrol, the cross-country skiing part of the Nordic combined, and the speed skating events. The stadium holds 45,000.
