= Julius Skutnabb =

Finnish speed skater

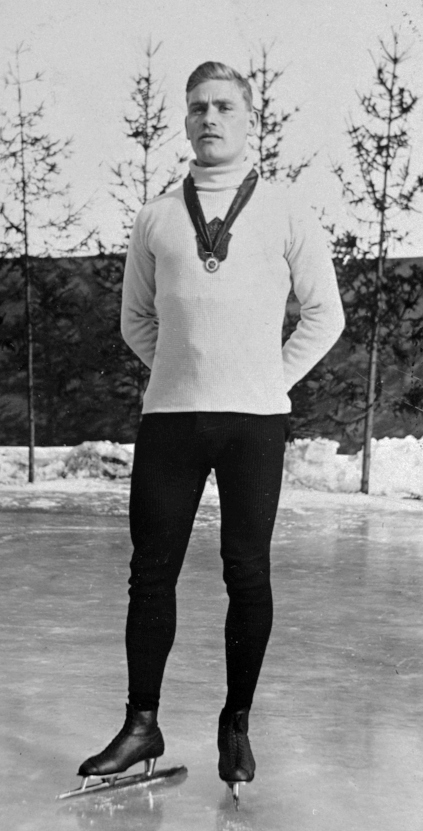

Personal information
- Born: 12 June 1889 Helsinki, Finland
- Died: 26 February 1965 (aged 75) Helsinki, Finland

Sport
- Sport: Speed skating
- Club: Helsingfors Skridskoklubb, Helsinki

Achievements and titles
- Personal best(s): 500 m – 44.8 (1926); 1500 m – 2:24.2 (1926); 5000 m – 8:44.0 (1926); 10,000 m – 17:59.3 (1922)
Medal record
Representing Finland
Olympic Games
Silver medal – second place	1924 Chamonix	5,000 m
Gold medal – first place	1924 Chamonix	10,000 m
Bronze medal – third place	1924 Chamonix	Allround
Silver medal – second place	1928 St. Moritz	5,000 m

Julius Ferninand Skutnabb (12 June 1889 – 26 February 1965) was a Finnish speed skater. A fireman by profession, he made his international debut at the World Allround Championships in 1914, but his international career was interrupted by World War I. He kept competing nationally, becoming the Finnish Allround Champion in 1914, 1916, and 1917. International activity resumed in 1922 and Skutnabb, already 32 years old, finished fifth at the World Allround Championships that year. After placing sixth at the world championships the following year, his best year came in 1924.

At the 1924 Winter Olympics of Chamonix, he first won silver on the 5,000 m behind compatriot Clas Thunberg; the next day he became Olympic Champion on the 10,000 m, while Thunberg took silver. Since these were the first Winter Olympics to be held, his 10,000 m time automatically was the Olympic record. These performances, combined with his 500 m and 1,500 m times during those Olympics, were good enough for a third place in the allround competition (which was also an Olympic speed skating event, but only in 1924), and Skutnabb returned home with three medals – one of each colour. Later in 1924 Skutnabb won a bronze medal at the World Allround Championships, and in 1926 he became European Allround Champion. Skutnabb participated in the 1928 Winter Olympics and won his second 5,000 m Olympic silver medal (this time behind Ivar Ballangrud) at the age of 38 years and 246 days.

== Medals ==
An overview of medals won by Skutnabb at important championships he participated in, listing the years in which he won each:

Championships	Gold medal	Silver medal	Bronze medal
Winter Olympics	1924 (10,000 m)	1924 (5,000 m); 1928 (5,000 m)	1924 (Allround)
World Allround	–	–	1924
European Allround	1926	–	–
Finnish Allround	1914; 1916; 1917	1915; 1920	1921
