= Speed skating at the 1924 Winter Olympics =

Speed skating at the I Olympic Winter Games
- Pictogram for speed skating
- Venue: Stade Olympique de Chamonix
- Date: 26–27 January 1924
- No. of events: 5
- Competitors: 31 from 10 nations

At the 1924 Winter Olympics in Chamonix, five speed skating events were contested, all for men. The competitions were held on Saturday, January 26, 1924, and on Sunday, January 27, 1924. Charles Jewtraw won the first gold medal of the 1924 Winter Games, and Clas Thunberg and Roald Larsen each won medals in all five events, with Thunberg winning 3 gold.

== Medal summary ==
Event	Gold		Silver		Bronze	
500 metres	Charles Jewtraw; United States	44.0	Oskar Olsen; Norway	44.2	Roald Larsen; Norway Clas Thunberg; Finland	44.8
1500 metres	Clas Thunberg; Finland	2:20.8	Roald Larsen; Norway	2:22.0	Sigurd Moen; Norway	2:25.6
5000 metres	Clas Thunberg; Finland	8:39.0	Julius Skutnabb; Finland	8:48.0	Roald Larsen; Norway	8:50.2
10,000 metres	Julius Skutnabb; Finland	18:04.8	Clas Thunberg; Finland	18:07.8	Roald Larsen; Norway	18:12.2
All-round	Clas Thunberg; Finland	198.023	Roald Larsen; Norway	199.763	Julius Skutnabb; Finland	202.347

== Participating nations ==
Eleven speed skaters competed in all four individual events.

A total of 31 speed skaters from ten nations competed at the Chamonix Games:

- Belgium (4)
- Canada (1)
- Finland (3)
- France (4)
- Great Britain (4)
- Latvia (1)
- Norway (5)
- Poland (1)
- Sweden (2)
- United States (6)

== Medal table ==
Rank	Nation	Gold	Silver	Bronze	Total
1	Finland	4	2	2	8
2	United States	1	0	0	1
3	Norway	0	3	4	7
Totals (3 entries)		5	5	6	16
