= 1924 Winter Olympics =

Multi-sport event in Chamonix, France

I Olympic Winter Games
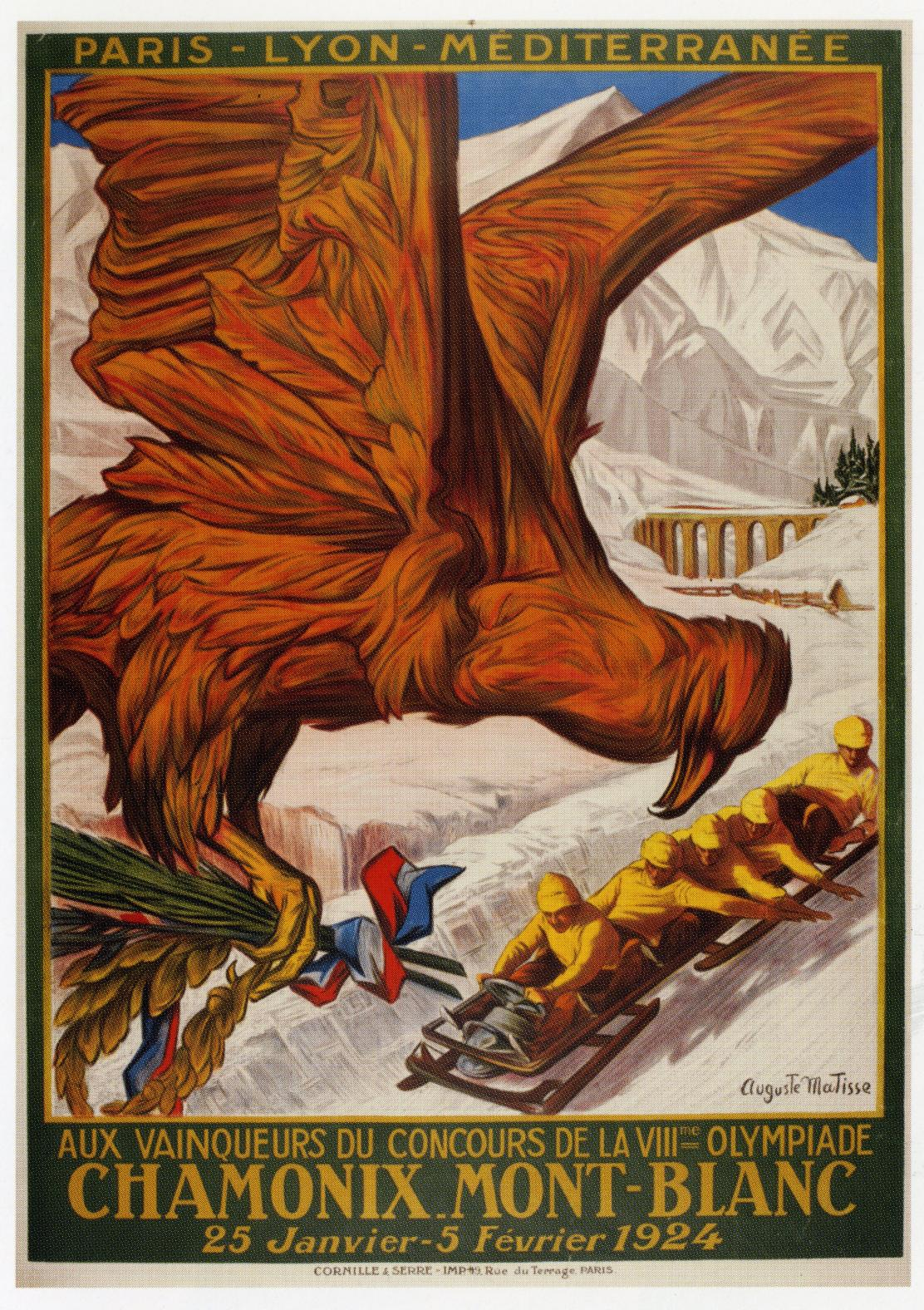
- Poster for the 1924 Winter Olympic Games
- Location: Chamonix, France
- Nations: 16
- Athletes: 304
- Events: 16 in 5 sports (9 disciplines)
- Opening: 25 January 1924
- Closing: 5 February 1924
- Opened by: Gaston Vidal
- Stadium: Stade Olympique de Chamonix

The 1924 Winter Olympics, officially known as the I Olympic Winter Games (French: I^{ers} Jeux olympiques d'hiver) and commonly known as Chamonix 1924 (Arpitan: Chamôni 1924), were a winter multi-sport event which was held in 1924 in Chamonix, France. Organized by the French Olympic Committee and held as part of an "International Winter Sports Week", the competitions took place in Chamonix and Haute-Savoie, France, from 25 January to 5 February 1924. Although not initially termed "Winter Olympics", the International Olympic Committee (IOC) decided to retrospectively grant the Chamonix competitions the status of the first Winter Olympic Games at the committee's 26th session on May 6, 1926.

The tradition of holding the Winter Olympics in the same year as the Summer Olympics would continue until 1992, after which the current practice of holding a Winter Olympics in the second year after each Summer Olympics began.

Although figure skating had been an Olympic event in both London and Antwerp and ice hockey had been an event in Antwerp, winter sports had always been limited by the season. At the 1921 IOC convention in Lausanne, there was a call for equality for winter sports. After much discussion, it was decided that France, host nation for the 1924 Summer Olympics, would hold an "international week of winter sport" in Chamonix.

While not one of the official 16 events (nor one of the six sports) during the "International Winter Sports Week", the closing ceremony included Pierre de Coubertin presenting gold medals in "Alpinism" (mountaineering) to the members of the 1922 British Mount Everest expedition, represented in Chamonix by Lt Col Edward Strutt, deputy expedition leader. (Note: Thirteen names were included at the 1924 closing ceremony. An additional eight expedition members were later awarded gold medals, after a request to the International Olympic Committee by 1922 expedition leader General Charles Granville Bruce.)

== Highlights ==
=== Day 2 ===
Charles Jewtraw of the United States won the first gold medal of the games in the 500-meter speed skate, making him the first Winter Olympic champion.

=== Day 4 ===
Sonja Henie of Norway, at just eleven years old, took part in the ladies' figure skating competition. Although she finished last, she became popular with fans and went on to take gold at the following three Winter Olympics.

=== Day 6 ===
Figure skater Gillis Grafström of Sweden became the first athlete to successfully defend his Summer Olympic title at the Winter Olympics (having won a gold medal in 1920).

=== Day 8 ===
The Canadian ice hockey team (Toronto Granites) finished their qualifying round with three wins against Czechoslovakia (30–0), Sweden (22–0), and Switzerland (33–0), scoring a total of 85 goals and conceding none.

=== Day 10 ===
Finding themselves in the same situation as Gillis Grafström, the Canadian ice hockey team is the last to defend their Summer Olympics title at the Winter Olympics successfully. Canada would dominate ice hockey in early Olympic competitions, winning six of the first seven gold medals awarded.

=== Epilogue ===
Taffy Abel (1900–1964) was an Indigenous Ojibwe ice hockey player. He was the first Native American in the Winter Olympic Games (1924 Hockey Silver Medal), the 1924 Flag Bearer for the United States at the 1924 Winter Olympics, the first Native American in the National Hockey League (1926), and a Stanley Cup champion (1929 and 1934).

At the closing ceremony, a prize for alpinism, a sport not officially included in the Olympic Winter Games, was awarded by Pierre de Coubertin to Lt Col Edward Strutt, the deputy leader of British expedition, on behalf of their attempt to climb Mount Everest in 1922.

For the first time in the history of the modern Olympics, the host country (in this case, France) failed to win any gold medals, finishing with three bronze medals. The same outcome occurred at the next Winter Olympics in St. Moritz where Switzerland won only a single bronze medal, the lowest ever output by a host nation at an Olympics. Later host nations to finish without gold medals included Canada at the 1976 Summer Olympics in Montreal, Yugoslavia at the 1984 Winter Olympics in Sarajevo, and Canada for a second time at the 1988 Winter Olympics in Calgary.

In 1925, the International Olympic Committee (IOC) decided to organize the Olympic Winter Games every four years, independent of the Olympic Games proper, and recognized the International Winter Sports Week as the first Olympic Winter Games in retrospect.

The final individual medal of Chamonix 1924 was presented in 1974. The ski jumping event was unusual because the bronze medalist was not determined for fifty years. Norway's Thorleif Haug was awarded third place at the event's conclusion, but a clerical error in calculating Haug's score was discovered in 1974 by skiing historian Jakob Vaage, who further determined that Anders Haugen of the United States, who had finished fourth, had actually scored 0.095 points more than Haug. This was verified by the IOC. On 12 September 1974, Anders Haugen, at the age of 85, came to Norway and was presented the bronze medal by Anna Maria Magnussen, Thorleif Haug's youngest daughter.

In 2006, the IOC confirmed that the medals awarded to the 1924 curling and military patrol teams were official. The IOC verified that curling was officially part of the program, after the Glasgow Herald newspaper filed a claim on behalf of the families of the team.

== Events ==
Medals were awarded in 16 events contested in 5 sports (9 disciplines). Many sources do not list curling and the military patrol as Olympic events, or list them as demonstration events. However, no such designation was made in 1924. In February 2006, the International Olympic Committee (IOC) ruled that curling and military patrol were part of the Olympic program, and have included the medals awarded in the official count.

- Bobsleigh (1) ()
- Curling (1) ()
- Ice hockey (1) ()
- Skating
  - Figure skating (3) ()
  - Speed skating (5) ()
- Nordic skiing ()
  - Military patrol (1) () (Note: The official website of the Olympic Movement now treats Men's Military Patrol at the 1924 Games as an event within the sport of Biathlon. However, the 1924 Official Report treats it as an event and discipline within what was then called Skiing and is now called Nordic Skiing.)
  - Cross-country skiing (2) ()
  - Nordic combined (1) ()
  - Ski jumping (1) ()

== Venues ==
- La Piste de Bobsleigh des Pellerins – Bobsleigh
- Le Tremplin Olympique du Mont – Ski jumping, Nordic combined (ski jumping)
- Stade Olympique de Chamonix – Cross-country skiing, Curling, Figure skating, Ice hockey, Military patrol, Nordic combined (cross-country skiing), and Speed skating

== Participating nations ==
Athletes from 16 nations competed in the first Winter Olympic Games. Germany was banned from competing in the games, and instead hosted a series of games called Deutsche Kampfspiele.

Participating National Olympic Committees
- Austria (4)
- Belgium (18)
- Canada (12)
- Czechoslovakia (27)
- Finland (17)
- France (43) (host)
- Great Britain (44)
- Hungary (4)
- Italy (23)
- Latvia (2)
- Norway (14)
- Poland (7)
- Sweden (31)
- Switzerland (30)
- United States (24)
- Yugoslavia (4)

- Estonia speed skater Christfried Burmeister was also in the list of participants but the message about his withdrawal was not sent to the organizers.

=== Number of athletes by National Olympic Committees ===
IOC Letter Code	Country	Athletes
GBR	Great Britain	44
FRA	France	43
SWE	Sweden	31
SUI	Switzerland	30
TCH	Czechoslovakia	27
USA	United States	24
ITA	Italy	23
BEL	Belgium	18
FIN	Finland	17
NOR	Norway	14
CAN	Canada	12
POL	Poland	7
AUT	Austria	4
HUN	Hungary	4
YUG	Yugoslavia	4
LAT	Latvia	2
Total		304

== Medal count ==
Pierre de Coubertin—founder of the IOC & father of the modern Olympics movement—personally awarded, in addition to the medals awarded in the sports competitions, 21 gold medals to members of the 1922 British Mount Everest Expedition including 12 Britons, 7 Indians, 1 Australian and 1 Nepalese. Only the gold medal from 1924 is assigned to the Winter Olympics by the IOC in its database to the Mixed team, while the medals from 1932 and 1936 are assigned to the Summer Olympics for the respective NOCs.

* Host nation (France)

1924 Winter Olympics medal table
Rank	NOC	Gold	Silver	Bronze	Total
1	Norway	4	7	6	17
2	Finland	4	4	3	11
3	Austria	2	1	0	3
4	Switzerland	2	0	1	3
5	United States	1	2	1	4
6	Great Britain	1	1	2	4
7	Sweden	1	1	0	2
8	Canada	1	0	0	1
8	Mixed team	1	0	0	1
10	France*	0	0	3	3
11	Belgium	0	0	1	1
Totals (11 entries)		17	16	17	50

=== Podium sweeps ===
Date	Sport	Event	NOC	Gold	Silver	Bronze
30 January	Cross-country skiing	Men's 50 kilometre	Norway	Thorleif Haug	Thoralf Strømstad	Johan Grøttumsbråten
4 February	Nordic combined	Normal hill	Norway	Thorleif Haug	Thoralf Strømstad	Johan Grøttumsbråten

== See also ==
- List of 1924 Winter Olympics medal winners
- 1924 Summer Olympics
- Olympic Games held in France
  - 1900 Summer Olympics – Paris
  - 1924 Summer Olympics – Paris
  - 1924 Winter Olympics – Chamonix
  - 1968 Winter Olympics – Grenoble
  - 1992 Winter Olympics – Albertville
  - 2024 Summer Olympics – Paris
  - 2030 Winter Olympics – French Alps
- List of IOC country codes

== Notes ==
Winter Olympics
New sporting event	I Olympic Winter Games; Chamonix; 1924	Succeeded by St. Moritz
