= France at the 1924 Winter Olympics =

- IOC code: FRA
- NOC: French Olympic Committee

in Chamonix
- Competitors: 43 (41 men, 2 women) in 9 sports
- Flag bearer: Camille Mandrillon
- Medals Ranked 9th: Gold 0 Silver 0 Bronze 3 Total 3

Winter Olympics appearances (overview)
- 1924; 1928; 1932; 1936; 1948; 1952; 1956; 1960; 1964; 1968; 1972; 1976; 1980; 1984; 1988; 1992; 1994; 1998; 2002; 2006; 2010; 2014; 2018; 2022; 2026

France was the host nation for the 1924 Winter Olympics in Chamonix. For the first time in modern Olympics history, the host nation did not win a gold medal.

== Medalists ==
| Medal | Name | Sport | Event |
|---|---|---|---|
| Bronze | Henri Cournollet; Georges André; Armand Bénédic; Pierre Canivet | Curling | Men's event |
| Bronze | Andrée Joly; Pierre Brunet | Figure skating | Pairs |
| Bronze | Adrien Vandelle; Camille Mandrillon; Georges Berthet; Maurice Mandrillon | Military patrol | Men's event |

== Bobsleigh ==
| Sled | Athletes | Event | Run 1 | | Run 2 | | Run 3 | | Run 4 | | Total | |
| Sled | Athletes | Event | Time | Rank | Time | Rank | Time | Rank | Time | Rank | Time | Rank |
|---|---|---|---|---|---|---|---|---|---|---|---|---|
| FRA-1 | Antony Berg; Henri Aldebert; Georges André; Jean de Suarez d'Aulan | Four/five-man | 1:39.35 | 4 | 1:34.99 | 4 | 1:36.68 | 4 | 1:31.93 | 4 | 6:22.95 | 4 |
| FRA-2 | Émile Legrand; Gabriel Izard; Jacques Jany; Fernand Legrand | Four/five-man | 4:29:01 | 8 | DNF | – | 2:00.79 | 7 | 1:56.58 | 7 | DNF | – |

== Cross-country skiing ==
Men

| Event | Athlete | Race | |
| Event | Athlete | Time | Rank |
|---|---|---|---|
| 18 km | Denis Couttet | DNF | – |
| 18 km | Martial Payot | DNF | – |
| 18 km | Adrien "André" Vandelle | 1'43:58.0 | 29 |
| 18 km | Gilbert Ravanel | 1'35:33.4 | 20 |
| 50 km | André Blusset | DNF | – |
| 50 km | Camille Médy | 5'10:44 | 18 |
| 50 km | Auguste Perrin | 5'04:16 | 16 |
| 50 km | Édouard Pouteil-Noble | 4'58:27 | 15 |

== Curling ==
Team

| Pos. | Player |
|---|---|
| Skip | Henri Cournollet |
| | Georges André |
| | Armand Bénédic |
| | Pierre Canivet |
| Alternate | H. Aldebert |
| Alternate | R. Planque |

Standings

| Team | GP | W | L | PF | PA | PTS |
|---|---|---|---|---|---|---|
| Great Britain | 2 | 2 | 0 | 84 | 11 | 4 |
| Sweden | 2 | 1 | 1 | 25 | 48 | 2 |
| France (bronze) | 2 | 0 | 2 | 14 | 64 | 0 |

| Team 1 | Score | Team 2 |
|---|---|---|
| Sweden (II) | 18-10 | France |
| Great Britain | 46-4 | France |

== Figure skating ==
Men

| Athlete | Event | CF | FS | Points | Places | Final rank |
|---|---|---|---|---|---|---|
| André Malinet | Men's singles | 11 | 10 | 202.46 | 77 | 11 |
| Pierre Brunet | Men's singles | 9 | 6 | 268.61 | 54 | 8 |

Women

| Athlete | Event | CF | FS | Points | Places | Final rank |
|---|---|---|---|---|---|---|
| Andrée Joly | Women's singles | 7 | 2 | 231.92 | 38 | 5 |

Pairs

| Athletes | Points | Score | Final rank |
|---|---|---|---|
| Simone Sabouret; Charles Sabouret | 61 | 7.15 | 9 |
| Andrée Joly; Pierre Brunet | 22 | 9.89 | 3rd place, bronze medalist(s) |

== Ice hockey ==
=== Group B ===
The top two teams (highlighted) advanced to the medal round.

| Team | GP | W | L | GF | GA |
|---|---|---|---|---|---|
| United States | 3 | 3 | 0 | 52 | 0 |
| Great Britain | 3 | 2 | 1 | 34 | 16 |
| France | 3 | 1 | 2 | 9 | 42 |
| Belgium | 3 | 0 | 3 | 8 | 45 |

| 29 Jan | France | 2:15 (1:5,1:3,0:7) | Great Britain |
| 30 Jan | France | 0:22 (0:12,0:1,0:9) | United States |
| 31 Jan | France | 7:5 (3:3,3:1,1:1) | Belgium |

| — | France |
| | André Charlet; Pierre Charpentier; Jacques Chaudron; Raoul Couvert; Maurice del Valle; Alfréd de Rauch; Albert Hassler; Charles Lavaivre; Jean-Joseph Monnard; Calixte Payot; Philippe Payot; Léonhard Quaglia; Henri Couttet |

== Military patrol ==
| Athletes | Time | Shots on target | Final Time (-30s./hit) | Rank |
|---|---|---|---|---|
| Adrien "André" Vandelle; Camille Mandrillon; Georges Berthet; Maurice Mandrillon | 4'19:53 | 2 | 4'18:53 | 3rd place, bronze medalist(s) |

== Nordic combined ==
Events:

- 18 km cross-country skiing
- normal hill ski jumping

The cross-country skiing part of this event was combined with the main medal event of cross-country skiing. Those results can be found above in this article in the cross-country skiing section. Some athletes (but not all) entered in both the cross-country skiing and Nordic combined event, their time on the 18 km was used for both events. One would expect that athletes competing at the Nordic combined event, would participate in the cross-country skiing event as well, as they would have the opportunity to win more than one medal. This was not always the case due to the maximum number of athletes (here: 4) could represent a country per event.

The ski jumping (normal hill) event was held separate from the main medal event of ski jumping, results can be found in the table below.

| Athlete | Event | Ski Jumping | | | | Cross-country | | | Total | |
| Athlete | Event | Distance 1 | Distance 2 | Total points | Rank | Time | Points | Rank | Points | Rank |
|---|---|---|---|---|---|---|---|---|---|---|
| Adrien "André" Vandelle | Individual | 26.0 | 28.0 | 10.958 | 22 | 1'43:58 | 5.375 | 21 | 8.167 | 20 |
| Gilbert Ravanel | Individual | 31.0 | 33.0 | 12.625 | 19 | 1'35:33 | 9.500 | 13 | 11.063 | 18 |
| Kléber Balmat | Individual | 35.0 | 35.0 | 14.291 | 13 | 1'33:49 | 10.375 | 9 | 12.333 | 10 |
| Martial Payot | Individual | – | – | – | – | DNF | – | – | DNF | – |

== Ski jumping ==
| Athlete | Event | Jump 1 | | | Jump 2 | | | |
| Athlete | Event | Distance | Points | Rank | Distance | Points | Total | Rank |
|---|---|---|---|---|---|---|---|---|
| Louis Albert | Normal hill | fall | – | – | fall | – | DNF | – |
| Martial Payot | Normal hill | fall | 3.500 | 24 | 32.5 | 11.210 | 7.355 | 25 |
| Gilbert Ravanel | Normal hill | 32.5 | 12.960 | 20 | 32.0 | 11.833 | 12.397 | 22 |
| Kléber Balmat | Normal hill | 36.0 | 15.167 | 17 | 39.0 | 15.833 | 15.500 | 15 |

== Speed skating ==
Men

| Event | Athlete | Race | |
| Event | Athlete | Time | Rank |
|---|---|---|---|
| 500 m | Léon Quaglia | 48.4 | 15 |
| 500 m | Albert Hassler | 50.6 | 18 |
| 500 m | André Gegout | 53.2 | 20 |
| 500 m | Georges de Wilde | 54.8 | 21 |
| 1500 m | Léon Quaglia | 2:37.0 | 14 |
| 1500 m | André Gegout | 2:54.4 | 16 |
| 1500 m | Georges de Wilde | 2:55.0 | 18 |
| 5000 m | Léon Quaglia | 9:08.6 | 9 |
| 5000 m | André Gegout | 10:15.2 | 18 |
| 5000 m | Georges de Wilde | 10:39.8 | 19 |
| 10,000 m | Léon Quaglia | 18:25.0 | 7 |
| 10,000 m | André Gegout | 21:03.4 | 15 |
| 10,000 m | Georges de Wilde | DNF | – |

All-round
Distances: 500m; 5000m; 1500m & 10,000m.

| Athlete | Until distance 1 | | | Until distance 2 | | | Until distance 3 | | | Total | | |
| Athlete | Points | Score | rank | Points | Score | rank | Points | Score | rank | Points | Score | rank |
|---|---|---|---|---|---|---|---|---|---|---|---|---|
| Léon Quaglia | 10 | 48.40 | 10 | 15 | 103.26 | 8 | 21 | 155.59 | 8 | 25 | 210.84 | 6 |
| André Gegout | 15 | 53.20 | 15 | 25 | 114.72 | 12 | 31 | 172.85 | 10 | 36 | 236.02 | 9 |
| Georges de Wilde | 16 | 54.80 | 16 | 27 | 118.78 | 14 | 35 | 177.11 | 12 | DNF | | |
| Albert Hassler | 13 | 50.60 | 13 | DNF | | | | | | | | |
