= Cross-country skiing at the 1924 Winter Olympics – Men's 50 kilometre =

The 50 kilometre cross-country skiing event was part of the cross-country skiing at the 1924 Winter Olympics programme. The competition was held on Wednesday, 30 January 1924. Thirty-three cross-country skiers from eleven nations competed.

== Medalists ==
Gold	Silver	Bronze
Thorleif Haug; Norway	Thoralf Strømstad; Norway	Johan Grøttumsbråten; Norway

== Results ==
The competition began at 8:37 a.m. with the first starter André Blusset. The last starter was Erkki Kämäräinen at 9:09 a.m. The first finisher was Johan Grøttumsbråten at 12:27:46 p.m. and the event ended with the last finisher Szczepan Witkowski who crossed the finish-line at 3:25:58 p.m.

Place	Competitor	Time
1	Thorleif Haug (NOR)	3'44:32
2	Thoralf Strømstad (NOR)	3'46:23
3	Johan Grøttumsbråten (NOR)	3'47:46
4	Jon Mårdalen (NOR)	3'49:48
5	Torkel Persson (SWE)	4'05:59
6	Ernst Alm (SWE)	4'06:31
7	Matti Raivio (FIN)	4'06:50
8	Oskar Lindberg (SWE)	4'07:44
9	Enrico Colli (ITA)	4'10:50
10	Giuseppe Ghedina (ITA)	4'27:48
11	Vincenzo Colli (ITA)	4'31:34
12	Štefan Hevák (TCH)	4'44:58
13	Benigno Ferrera (ITA)	4'45:29
14	Antonín Gottstein (TCH)	4'45:48
15	Edouard Pouteil-Noble (FRA)	4'58:27
16	Auguste Perrin (FRA)	5'04:16
17	Josef Německý (TCH)	5'05:06
18	Camille Médy (FRA)	5'10:44
19	Oldřich Kolář (TCH)	5'18:14
20	Ferenc Németh (HUN)	6'16:32
21	Szczepan Witkowski (POL)	6'25:58
–	Per-Erik Hedlund (SWE)	DNF
–	Tapani Niku (FIN)	DNF
–	André Blusset (FRA)	DNF
–	Erkki Kämäräinen (FIN)	DNF
–	Simon Julen (SUI)	DNF
–	Dušan Zinaja (YUG)	DNF
–	Roberts Plūme (LAT)	DNF
–	Mirko Pandaković (YUG)	DNF
–	Hans Herrmann (SUI)	DNF
–	Zdenko Švigelj (YUG)	DNF
–	Adolf Aufdenblatten (SUI)	DNF
–	Anton Collin (FIN)	DNF
