= Cross-country skiing at the 1924 Winter Olympics – Men's 18 kilometre =

The 18 kilometre cross-country skiing event was part of the cross-country skiing at the 1924 Winter Olympics programme. The competition was held on Saturday, 2 February 1924. Forty-one cross-country skiers from twelve nations competed.

== Medalists ==
Gold	Silver	Bronze
Thorleif Haug; Norway	Johan Grøttumsbråten; Norway	Tapani Niku; Finland

== Results ==
The competition began at 9:30 a.m. with the first starter Antonín Gottstein. The last starter was Ragnar Omtvedt at 9:55:30 a.m. The first finisher was Tapani Niku at 10:51:56 a.m. and the event ended with the last finisher, who was again Ragnar Omtvedt at 12:00:33 p.m.

so=Starting order, there was a 30 second start interval (including those who participated only in the Nordic combined).

Place	so	Competitor	Time
1	34	Thorleif Haug (NOR)	1'14:31.4
2	27	Johan Grøttumsbråten (NOR)	1'15:51.0
3	9	Tapani Niku (FIN)	1'16:26.0
4	35	Jon Mårdalen (NOR)	1'16:56.8
5	10	Einar Landvik (NOR)	1'17:27.4
6	12	Per-Erik Hedlund (SWE)	1'17:49.4
7	38	Matti Raivio (FIN)	1'19:10.4
8	8	Elis Sandin (SWE)	1'19:24.0
9	20	Torkel Persson (SWE)	1'19:29.8
10	33	Erik Winnberg (SWE)	1'20:29.4
11	22	Matti Ritola (FIN)	1'25:13.0
12	40	Enrico Colli (ITA)	1'26:32.4
13	7	Antonio Herin (ITA)	1'33:06.4
14	21	Peter Schmid (SUI)	1'33:34.8
15	24	Daniele Pellissier (ITA)	1'33:45.2
16	30	Anton Collin (FIN)	1'33:54.6
17	14	Štefan Hevák (TCH)	1'34:43.4
18	1	Anton Gottstein (TCH)	1'34:54.0
19	6	Sigurd Overby (USA)	1'34:56.0
20	5	Gilbert Ravanel (FRA)	1'35:33.4
21	29	Achille Bacher (ITA)	1'36:03.8
22	39	Xaver Affentranger (SUI)	1'36:36.2
23	17	Václav Jón (TCH)	1'37:20.8
24	16	František Hák (TCH)	1'39:41.6
25	19	Hans Eidenbenz (SUI)	1'39:51.8
26	31	Alexandre Girard-Bille (SUI)	1'41:43.4
27	15	Franciszek Bujak (POL)	1'42:13.0
28	3	Andrzej Krzeptowski (POL)	1'43:02.8
29	11	Adrien "André" Vandelle (FRA)	1'43:58.0
30	13	John Carleton (USA)	1'45:49.8
31	25	István Déván (HUN)	1'50:20.8
32	37	Zdenko Švigelj (YUG)	1'50:27.6
33	2	Anders Haugen (USA)	1'55:04.2
34	26	Vladimir Kajzelj (YUG)	2'00:43.0
35	41	Ragnar Omtvedt (USA)	2'05:03.0
36	4	Dušan Zinaja (YUG)	2'12:19.4
–	23	Béla Szepes (HUN)	DNF
–	32	Mirko Pandaković (YUG)	DNF
–	28	Martial Payot (FRA)	DNF
–	36	Roberts Plūme (LAT)	DNF
–	18	Denis Couttet (FRA)	DNF
