= Payot (surname) =

Payot (English: /pɑːˈjoʊ/, French: [pajo]) is a French surname that may refer to:

- Charles Payot (1901–?), French Olympic ice hockey player
- Étienne Payot (1900–?), French Olympic bobsledder
- Jules Payot (1859–1939), French educationist
- Lolette Payot (1910–), Swiss-French tennis player
- Martial Payot (1900–1949), French Olympic skier
- Nadia Payot (1887–1966), French doctor, businesswoman, the founder of the luxury beauty brand Laboratoires Payot
- Philippe Payot (1893–1958), French Olympic ice hockey player, brother of Charles
- Venance Payot (1826-1902), French naturalist, glaciologist, Chamonix mountain guide
