= Georges Berthet =

French sportsman (1903–1979)

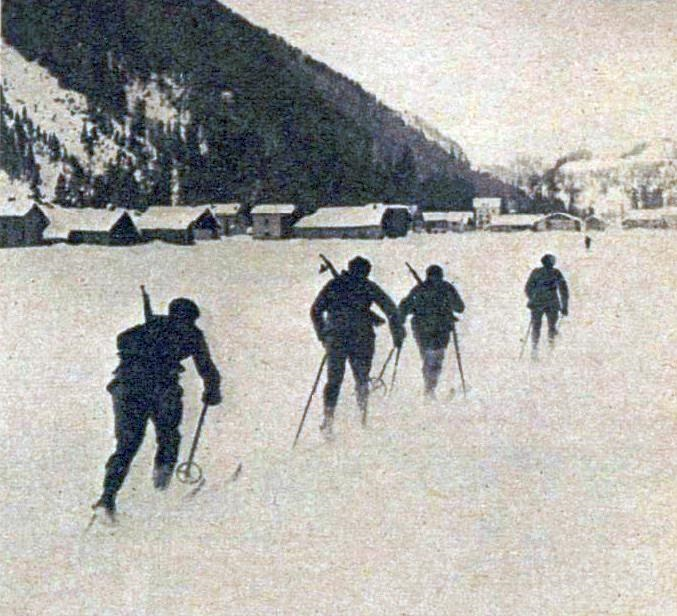

Personal information
- Born: 18 September 1903 Les Rousses, France
- Died: 14 August 1979 (aged 75) Morez, France

Sport
- Sport: Skiing
Medal record
Representing France
Men's military patrol
Olympic Games
Bronze medal – third place	1924 Chamonix	Team

Georges Berthet (18 September 1903 – 14 August 1979) was a French sportsman who took part in the 1924 Winter Olympics in Chamonix.

Berthet was born in Les Rousses. In 1923 he was French Nordic combined champion and seventh in the international ranking of ski jumping. He won an Olympic bronze medal at the 1924 Winter Olympics in Chamonix. He was part of the French team which came in third place in the military patrol behind Switzerland and Finland. Six teams took part in the event on 31 January 1924 but only four completed the course. The others in the team were Camille Mandrillon, Adrien Vandelle and Maurice Mandrillon. He died in Morez.
