= Erkki Kämäräinen =

Finnish cross-country skier

Personal information
- Nationality: Finnish
- Born: 13 June 1897 Sotkamo, Finland
- Died: 14 November 1964 (aged 67) Kuopio, Finland

Sport
- Sport: Cross-country skiing

Erkki Kämäräinen (13 June 1897 – 14 November 1964) was a Finnish cross-country skier. He competed in the men's 50 kilometre event at the 1924 Winter Olympics.

== Cross-country skiing results ==
=== Olympic Games ===
Year	Age	18 km	50 km
1924	26	—	DNF

=== World Championships ===
Year	Age	30 km	50 km
1926	28	11	7
