= August Eskelinen =

Finnish biathlete (1898–1987)

Personal information
- Born: 16 July 1898 Iisalmi, Finland
- Died: 10 June 1987 (aged 88)

Sport
- Sport: Skiing
Medal record
Representing Finland
Men's military patrol
Olympic Games
Silver medal – second place	1924 Chamonix	Team

August "Aku" Eskelinen (16 July 1898 – 10 June 1987) was a Finnish biathlete who competed in the 1924 Winter Olympics.

Eskelinen was born in Iisalmi. In 1924 he was a member of the Finnish military patrol team which won the silver medal.
