= Erik Winnberg =

Swedish cross-country skier

Erik Winnberg (22 July 1895 in Östersund, Jämtland – 5 May 1981) was a Swedish cross-country skier who competed in the 1924 Winter Olympics.

In 1924 he finished tenth in the 18 km event.

== Cross-country skiing results ==
=== Olympic Games ===
Year	Age	18 km	50 km
1924	28	10	—
