= Mandrillon =

Mandrillon is a French surname. Notable people with the surname include:

- Camille Mandrillon (1891–1969), French biathlete
- Maurice Mandrillon (1902–1981), French skier
- René Mandrillon (1928–1970), French cross-country skier
