= Einar Landvik =

Norwegian Nordic skier (1898–1993)

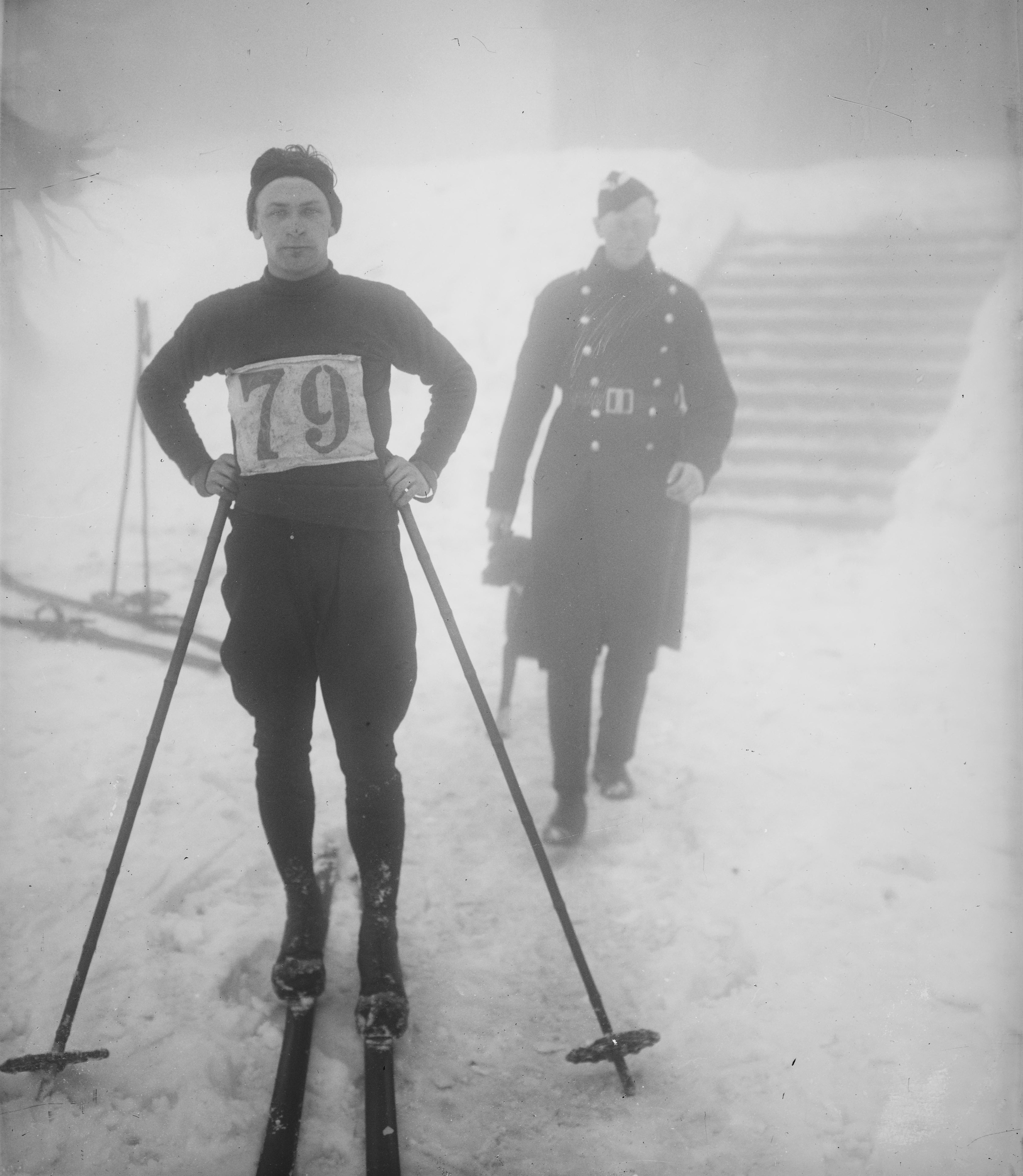

Medal record

Men's Nordic combined

Representing Norway

World Championships
Bronze medal – third place	1926 Lahti	Individual

Einar Aslaksen Landvik (25 March 1898 – 27 November 1993) was a Norwegian Nordic skier who won the Holmenkollen medal in 1925.

He was born in Kviteseid Municipality and died in Tinn Municipality.

Landvik finished fifth in both the 18 km cross-country event and the individual ski jumping at the 1924 Winter Olympics in Chamonix.

He won bronze in the Nordic combined at the 1926 FIS Nordic World Ski Championships in Lahti.

== Cross-country skiing results ==
All results are sourced from the International Ski Federation (FIS).

=== Olympic Games ===
Year	Age	18 km	50 km
1924	25	5	—
