= Matti Ritola =

Finnish cross-country skier

Personal information
- Born: 1 January 1902 Haapavesi, Finland
- Died: 4 May 1967 (aged 65)

Sport
- Sport: Cross-country skiing

Matti Ritola (1 January 1902, in Haapavesi – 4 May 1967) was a Finnish cross-country skier. He was born in Haapavesi. He participated at the 1924 Winter Olympics in Chamonix, where he placed 11th in 18 km.

== Cross-country skiing results ==
=== Olympic Games ===
Year	Age	18 km	50 km
1924	22	11	—

=== World Championships ===
Year	Age	30 km	50 km
1926	24	9	—
