= Heikki Hirvonen =

Finnish biathlete (1895–1973)

Personal information
- Born: 8 February 1895 Rääkkylä, Finland
- Died: 19 August 1973 (aged 78) Rääkkylä, Finland

Sport
- Sport: Skiing
Medal record
Representing Finland
Men's military patrol
Olympic Games
Silver medal – second place	1924 Chamonix	Team

Heikki Hirvonen (8 February 1895 in Rääkkylä – 19 August 1973 in Rääkkylä) was a Finnish biathlete who competed in the 1924 Winter Olympics.

He was born in Rääkkylä and died in Riihimäki. In 1924 he was a member of the Finnish military patrol team which won the silver medal.
