= Anton Collin =

Finnish skier and cyclist

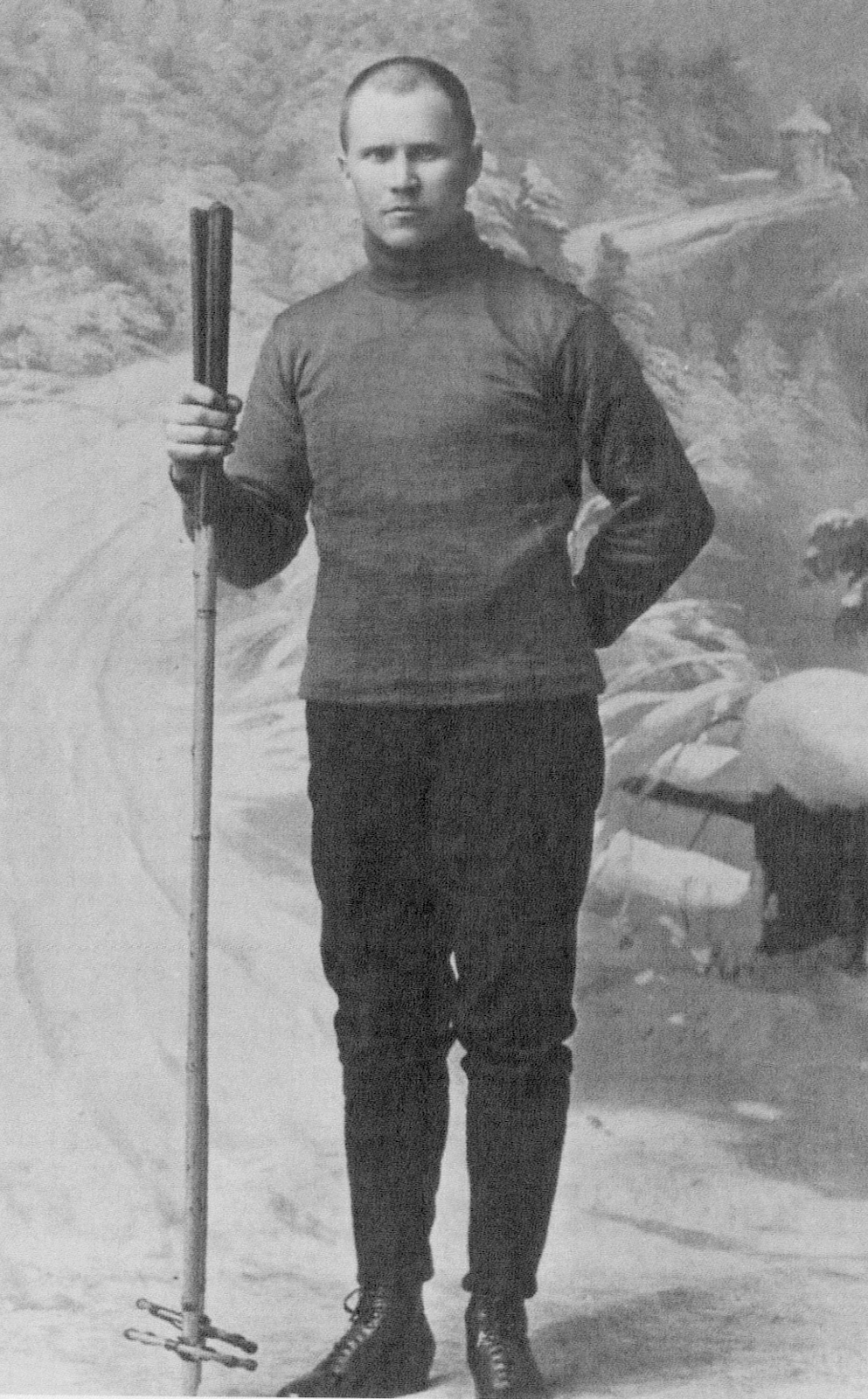

Personal information
- Born: 12 October 1891 Pihlajavesi, Keuruu, Finland
- Died: 31 May 1973 (aged 81) Ähtäri, Finland
- Height: 172 cm (5 ft 8 in)
- Weight: 71 kg (157 lb)

Sport
- Sport: Cross-country skiing, road cycling
- Club: Lahden Hiihtoseura

Anton Johannes Collin (12 October 1891 – 31 May 1973) was a Finnish cross country skier and road cyclist. He won the 50 km event at the 1922 Holmenkollen ski festival, becoming the first non-Norwegian to win at Holmenkollen. At the 1924 Winter Olympics he placed 16th over 18 km, and failed to finish his 50 km race. He also abandoned his 188 km cycling race at the 1924 Summer Olympics.

== Cross-country skiing results ==
=== Olympic Games ===
Year	Age	18 km	50 km
1924	32	16	DNF

=== World Championships ===
Year	Age	18 km	50 km
1926	34	—	13
