= Czechoslovakia at the 1924 Winter Olympics =

- IOC code: TCH
- NOC: Czechoslovak Olympic Committee

in Chamonix
- Competitors: 27 in 5 sports
- Flag bearer: Jaroslav Řezáč (ice hockey)
- Medals: Gold 0 Silver 0 Bronze 0 Total 0

Winter Olympics appearances (overview)
- 1924; 1928; 1932; 1936; 1948; 1952; 1956; 1960; 1964; 1968; 1972; 1976; 1980; 1984; 1988; 1992

Other related appearances
- Czech Republic (1994–pres.); Slovakia (1994–pres.)

Czechoslovakia was one of the 16 nations to compete at the inaugural 1924 Winter Olympics in Chamonix, France. The team finished without winning a medal. Figure skater Josef Slíva’s fourth place was the team’s best finish. Ice hockey reserve goalkeeper Jaroslav Řezáč was Czechoslovakia’s first flagbearer in the history of the Winter Games.

== Cross-country skiing ==
Men’s 18 km (Classic)

- Štěpán Hevák – 1:34:43.4 (17th)
- Antonín Gottstein – 1:34:54.0 (18th)
- Václav Jón – 1:37:20.8 (23rd)
- František Hák – 1:39:41.6 (24th)

Men’s 50 km Free (Classic) The cross country skiing marathon route led through mountain streams and difficult steep climbs. Only 21 competitors of 33 starting completed the race, including all four Czechoslovak skiers.

- Štěpán Hevák – 4:44:58 (12th)
- Antonín Gottstein – 4:45:48 (14th)
- Josef Německý – 5:05:06 (17th)
- Oldřich Kolář

== Figure skating ==
The only Czech skaters in the Games Josef Slíva excelled in his elegant skating but was under-marked by the Austrian judges which left him in fourth place.

Men

- Josef Slíva – 4th place

== Ice hockey ==
The Czechoslovak team’s nomination was marred by domestic conflicts and animosities towards the club Sparta Praha. Only soldier Josef Maleček was included in the team from Sparta after the Ministry of Defence order, while Karel Káďa Pešek and others stayed at home.

Canada (represented by the Toronto Granites) was supreme in the competition, winning all five matches. It met with Czechoslovakia in the group and smashed it 30-0. Czechoslovakia lost also to Sweden, despite leading in the first period – Stránský allowed four goals shot from long distance. The team then parted with the tournament by beating Switzerland and by finishing in tied fifth place.

Men – 5th place

- Round 1
  - lost to Canada 0-30
  - lost to Sweden 3-9 (goals: Maleček 2, Loos)
  - beat Switzerland 11-2 (goals: Maleček 4, Šroubek 3, Loos 3, Jirkovský)
- Squad:
  - Goalkeepers: Jaroslav Stránský, Jaroslav Řezáč
  - Defenders: Otakar Vindyš, Vilém Loos
  - Forwards: Jaroslav Jirkovský, Josef Šroubek, Josef Maleček, Miloslav Fleischman, Jan Palouš, Jan Fleischman, Jan Krásl, Jaroslav Pušbauer, Hofta
  - no coach

== Military patrol ==
Athletes	Time	Shots on target	Final Time (-30s./hit)	Rank
Bohuslav Josífek; Jan Mittlöhner; Josef Bím; Karel Buchta	4'22:24	5	4'19:54	4

== Nordic combined ==
With good results in the opening cross country race, the Czechoslovak skiers secured themselves positions only behind the competitors of Nordic countries Norway and Sweden – in fact, Adolf and Buchberger were the only skiers, who managed to beat at least one competitor of these countries (8th-place Jakobsson of Sweden).

Individual Race

- Josef Adolf – 13.729 points (6th)
- Walter Buchberger – 13.625 (7th)
- Josef Bím – 12.083 (13th)
- Otakar Německý – did not finish cross country

== Ski jumping ==
Individual Competition

- Franz Wende – 16.48 points – 40.5 and 44.0 meters (10th)
- Karel Koldovský – 12.50 – 33.5 and 39.0 (20th)
- Josef Bím – 2.33 – two falls (27th)
- M. Prokopec – did not start
