= Oskar Lindberg =

Oskar Lindberg may refer to:

- Oskar Lindberg (composer) (1887–1955), Swedish composer and church musician in Stockholm
- Oskar Lindberg (cross-country skier) (1894–1977), winner of Vasaloppet ski race in 1923

== See also ==
- Oscar Lindberg (disambiguation)
