= Herin =

Herin is an Italian surname. Notable people with the surname include:

- Antonio Herin (1896–1992), Italian cross-country skier
- Corrado Herin, Italian luger
- Danièle Hérin (born 1947), French computer scientist and politician

== See also ==
- Hérin
