= Torkel Persson =

Swedish cross-country skier

Personal information
- Born: June 21, 1894
- Died: August 6, 1972 (aged 78)

Sport
- Sport: cross-country skiing

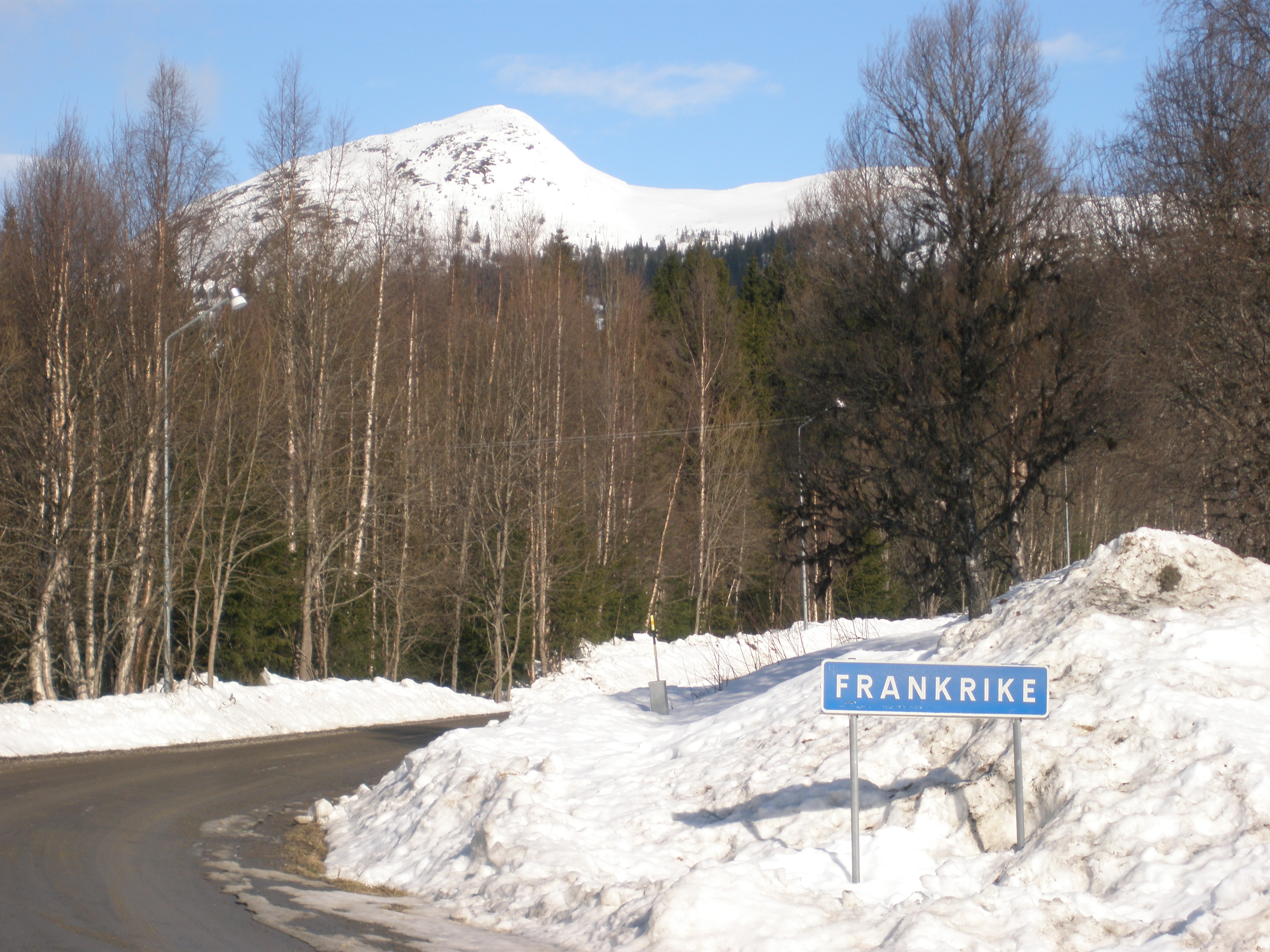
Torkel Persson was a cross-country skier from Frankrike in the north of Offerdal, Sweden

Torkel Persson (June 21, 1894, Undersåker, Jämtland – August 6, 1972) was a Swedish cross-country skier from Offerdal in Jämtland who competed in the 1924 Winter Olympics.

In 1924 he finished fifth in the 50 kilometre event as well as ninth in the 18 km competition.

== Cross-country skiing results ==
=== Olympic Games ===
Year	Age	18 km	50 km
1924	29	9	5
