= Tapani Niku =

Finnish cross-country skier

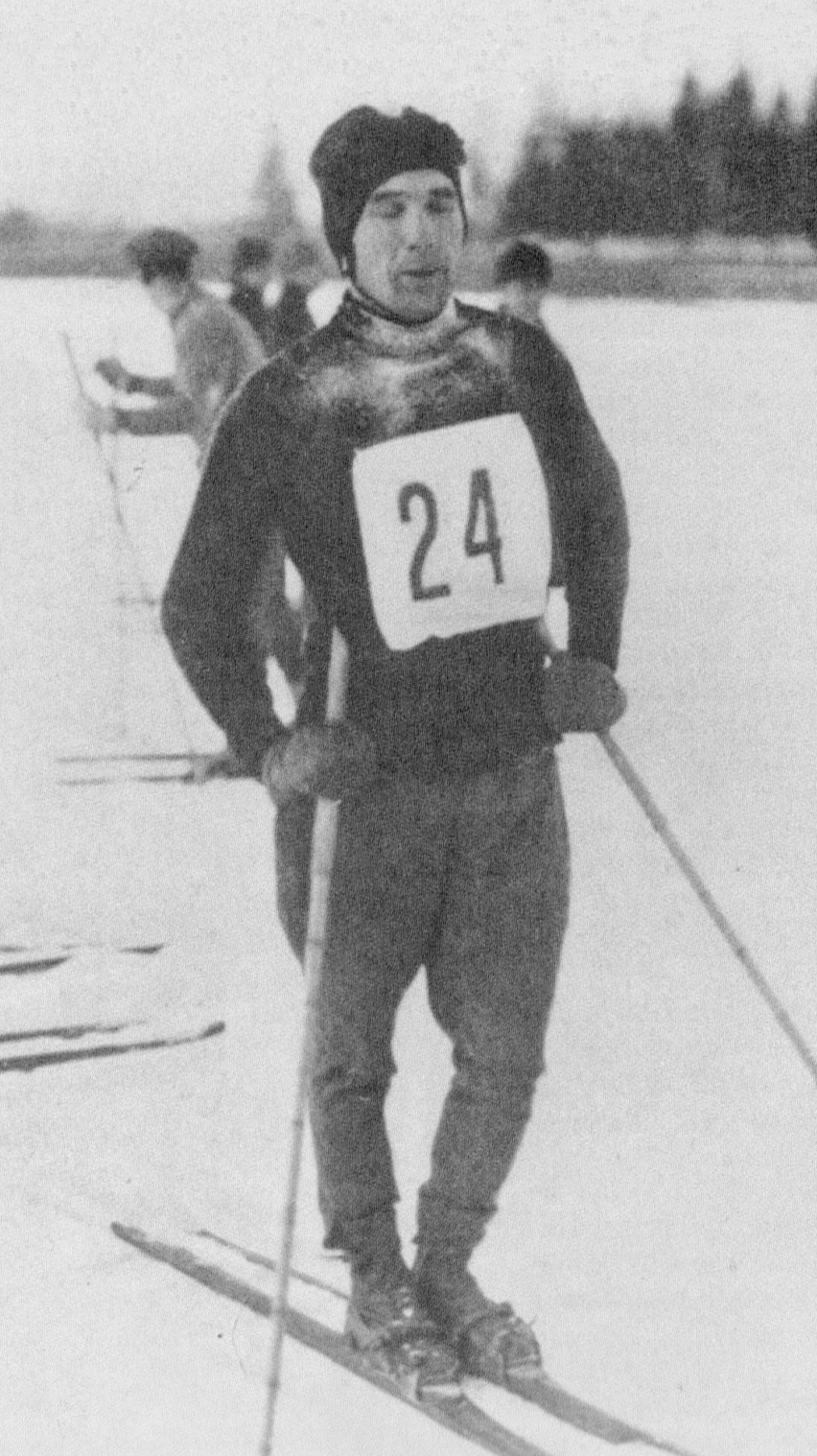
- Tapani Niku in the 1920s

Personal information
- Born: 4 January 1894 Haapavesi, Grand Duchy of Finland
- Died: 6 April 1989 (aged 94) Lahti, Finland
- Height: 171 cm (5 ft 7 in)
- Weight: 65–67 kg (143–148 lb)

Sport
- Sport: Cross-country skiing
- Club: Haapaveden Hiihtäjät
Medal record
Men's cross-country skiing
Representing Finland
Olympic Games
Bronze medal – third place	1924 Chamonix	18 km

Tapani Niku (born Karsikas, 1 April 1895 – 6 April 1989) was a Finnish cross-country skier who competed at the 1924 Winter Olympics. He won a bronze medal in the 18 km event and failed to finish his 50 km event. At the FIS Nordic World Ski Championships 1926 he placed sixth over 50 km and 13th over 18 km.

Niku won nine national titles, in the 10 km (1923–26), 30 km (1921, 1923 and 1925–26) and 60 km events (1925). He also won the 50 km race at the Lahti Ski Games in 1923–25. He retired in 1926 and later worked as a forester and a ski manufacturer.

After he had died, he was honoured with a state funeral.

== Cross-country skiing results ==
All results are sourced from the International Ski Federation (FIS).

=== Olympic Games ===
- 1 medal – (1 bronze)

Year	Age	18 km	50 km
1924	28	Bronze	DNF

=== World Championships ===
Year	Age	30 km	50 km
1926	30	13	6
