= Oscar Lindberg =

Oscar Lindberg may refer to:

- Oscar Lindberg (cross-country skier) (1894–1977), competitor in the 1924 Winter Olympics
- Oscar Lindberg (ice hockey) (born 1991), ice hockey player

== See also ==
- Oskar Lindberg (disambiguation)
