= Jon Mårdalen =

Norwegian cross-country skier

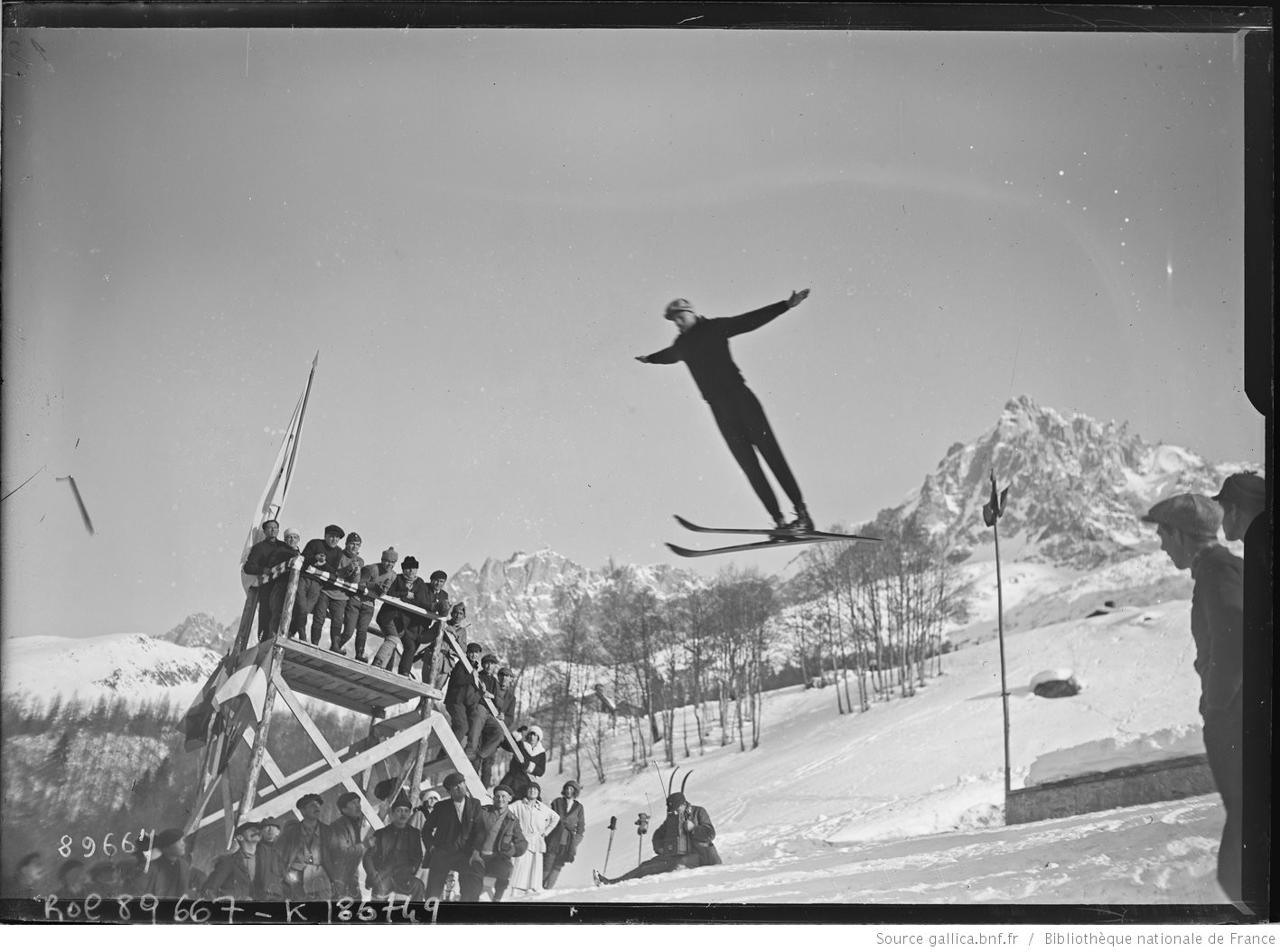
Jon Mårdalen in 1924

Jon Mårdalen (August 18, 1895 – December 5, 1977) was a Norwegian cross-country skier who competed in the 1924 Winter Olympics.

In 1924 he finished fourth in the 50 km competition as well as fourth in the 18 km event.

== Cross-country skiing results ==
All results are sourced from the International Ski Federation (FIS).

=== Olympic Games ===
Year	Age	18 km	50 km
1924	28	4	4
