= Paolo Francia =

Italian biathlete

Paolo Francia (born 1901 – year of death unknown) was an Italian Olympic biathlete.

With the rank of an alpino (soldier E-1 of the Alpini corps), he was member of the Italian military patrol at the 1924 Winter Olympics in Chamonix led by Second lieutenant Piero Dente. The team was one of two that withdrew due to bad weather conditions.
