= Matti Raivio =

Finnish cross-country skier

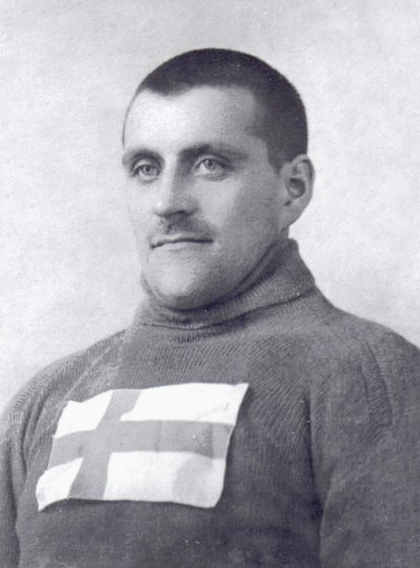

Personal information
- Born: 22 February 1893 Pihlajavesi, Finland
- Died: 25 May 1957 (aged 86) Pihlajavesi, Finland
- Height: 169 cm (5 ft 7 in)
- Weight: 70 kg (154 lb)

Sport
- Sport: Cross-country skiing
- Club: Pilajaveden Sk:n Urheilijat
Medal record
Men's cross-country skiing
Representing Finland
World Championships
Gold medal – first place	1926 Lahti	30 km
Gold medal – first place	1926 Lahti	50 km

Matti Raivio (22 February 1893 – 25 May 1957) was a Finnish Cross-country skier who won the 30 km and 50 km events at the 1926 FIS Nordic World Ski Championships. At the 1924 Winter Olympics he finished seventh in the 18 km and 50 km races. He abandoned the 50 km event at the 1928 Winter Olympics.

== Cross-country skiing results ==
All results are sourced from the International Ski Federation (FIS).

=== Olympic Games ===
Year	Age	18 km	50 km
1924	30	7	7
1928	34	—	DNF

=== World Championships ===
- 2 medals – (2 gold)

Year	Age	30 km	50 km
1926	32	Gold	Gold
