= Ritola =

Ritola is a surname. Notable people with the surname include:

- Ville Ritola (1896–1982), Finnish athlete
- Mattias Ritola (born 1987), Swedish ice-hockey player
- Matti Ritola (1902–1967), Finnish cross-country skier
