= Military patrol at the 1924 Winter Olympics =

Military patrol

At the 1924 Winter Olympics, in Chamonix, France, a military patrol competition was held. The Olympic results database lists the official medal winners for the event, as does the Official Report (1924), yet several sources have incorrectly counted this competition as a demonstration event only. The event was also demonstrated in 1928, 1936, and 1948, but those results are still considered unofficial. A full 36 years would pass before the modern version of the sport, biathlon, became an official Winter Olympic sport. The official website of the IOC now treats Men's Military Patrol at the 1924 Games as a separate discipline, without mixing it with the sports of Skiing or Biathlon. However, the 1924 Official Report treats it as an event within the sport of skiing.

The competition was held on Tuesday, January 29, 1924. Each team had 4 people and the distance was 25 km. The targets were balloons at 150m. Six teams started the event, but only four finished with Italy and Poland withdrawing due to bad conditions.

== Results ==
Place	Biathletes	Adjusted Time (Note: The adjusted time was the actual time less 30 seconds for every shot on target.)	Shots On Target
1st place, gold medalist(s)	Denis Vaucher (Captain), Alfred Aufdenblatten, Antoine Julen, Alfons Julen (SUI)	3:56:06	8
2nd place, silver medalist(s)	Väinö Bremer (Captain), August Eskelinen, Heikki Hirvonen, Ville Mattila (FIN)	4:00:10	11
3rd place, bronze medalist(s)	Camille Mandrillon (Captain), Georges Berthet, Maurice Mandrillon, Adrien "André" Vandelle (FRA)	4:18:53	2
4	Karel Buchta (Captain), Josef Bím, Bohuslav Josífek, Jan Mittlöhner (TCH)	4:19:54	5
—	Piero Dente (Captain), Goffredo Lagger, Albino Bich, Paolo Francia (ITA)	DNF	
—	Zbigniew Wóycicki (Captain), Szczepan Witkowski, Stanisław Chrobak, Stanisław Kądziołka (POL)	DNF	

== Participating nations ==
A total of 24 biathletes from six nations competed at the Chamonix Games:

- Czechoslovakia (4)
- France (4)
- Finland (4)
- Italy (4)
- Poland (4)
- Switzerland (4)

== Medal table ==
Rank	Nation	Gold	Silver	Bronze	Total
1	Switzerland	1	0	0	1
2	Finland	0	1	0	1
3	France	0	0	1	1
Totals (3 entries)		1	1	1	3

== Bibliography ==
- Official Report (1924) of both Summer and Winter games: (ed.) M. Avé, Comité Olympique Français. Les Jeux de la VIII^{e} Olympiade Paris 1924 – Rapport Officiel (PDF) (in French). Paris: Librairie de France. Archived from the original (PDF) on 5 May 2011.
