= Couttet =

Couttet is a French surname. Notable people with the surname include:

- Denis Couttet (1900–1956), French cross country skier
- Henri Couttet (1901–1953), French ice hockey player
- James Couttet (1921–1997), French alpine skier and ski jumper
- Lucienne Schmidt-Couttet (1926–2022), French alpine skier, wife of James Couttet
