= Zbigniew Wóycicki =

Polish military officer and skier (1902–1928)

Personal information
- Full name: Zbigniew Czesław Wóycicki
- Born: June 1, 1902 Zakopane, Congress Poland
- Died: April 2, 1928 (aged 25) Zakopane, Poland

Sport
- Sport: Skiing

Zbigniew Czesław Wóycicki (June 1, 1902 – April 2, 1928) was a Polish military officer and skier.

Wóycicki was born in Zakopane. He was the leader of the national Olympic military patrol team at the 1924 and 1928 Winter Olympics. In 1924, when the Polish m.p. team was one of two which withdrew owing to bad weather conditions, he was the youngest participant. In 1928 he had the rank of a porucznik, and finished with his team seventh. He died in his hometown in the same year after the appendectomy.

Posthumously he was awarded the Silver Cross of Merit.
