= Jan Slavomír Tomíček =

Czech writer, journalist, historian and ethnologist

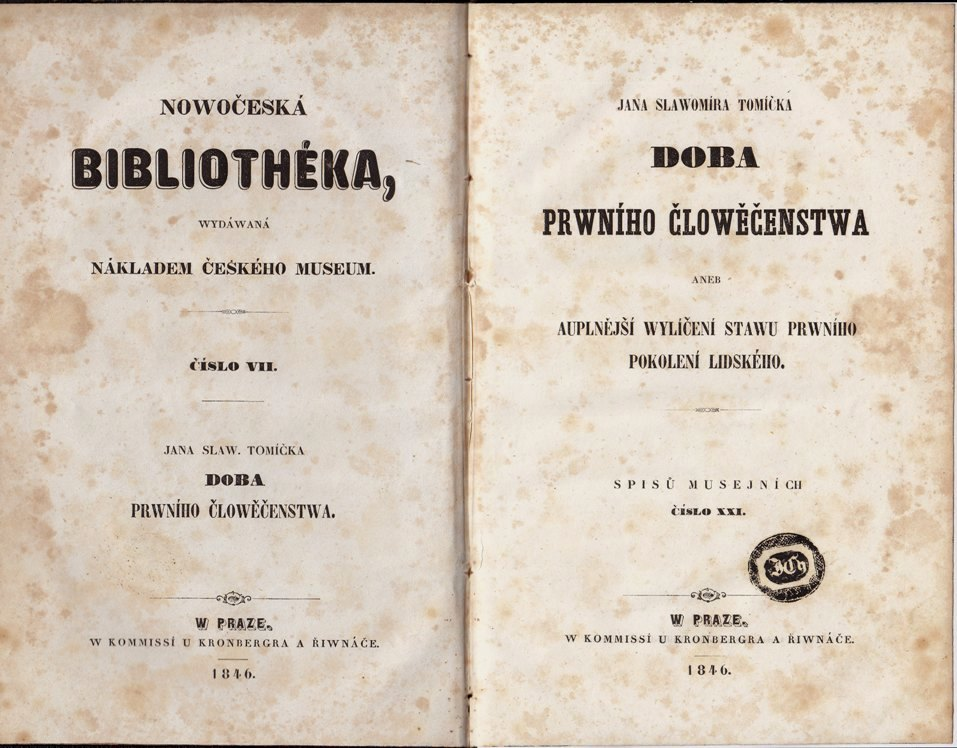
J. S. Tomíček, The Age of the First Man

Jan Slavomír Tomíček (15 or 16 July 1806 in Horní Branná – 28 April 1866 in Prague) was a Czech writer, journalist, historian and ethnologist.

== Biography ==
Tomíček graduated from a gymnasium in Jičín and studied philosophy in Prague. He did not graduate, though, as he left in an effort to become an independent writer. Very soon, however, he had to start giving private lessons to earn enough money.

He was a member of the fellowship of the magazine Čechoslav; he also contributed to Světozor published by Pavel Josef Šafařík, and in 1834 he became an editor of Pražské noviny (The Prague News). He was invited to join this newspaper by F. L. Čelakovský. A criticism of the Russian tsar, written by the liberal-minded Tomíček, cost Čelakovský his position. Tomíček contributed to other magazines as well, and also translated.

He published several books, of which Doba prwního člowěčenstwa (The Age of the First Man, publ. by Matice česká, 1846) in particular outraged the censorship and the Archbishop of Prague so much that it threatened the existence of its publishing house.

In 1848, he became a substitute teacher of the Czech language at Charles University and an associate member of the Royal Czech Society of Sciences. However, he never attained a university professorship, which, together with facing poverty, made him feel disillusioned. The Czechs remember him chiefly for his famous criticism of Máj, published in Česká wčela (The Czech Bee) in 1836.

== Works ==
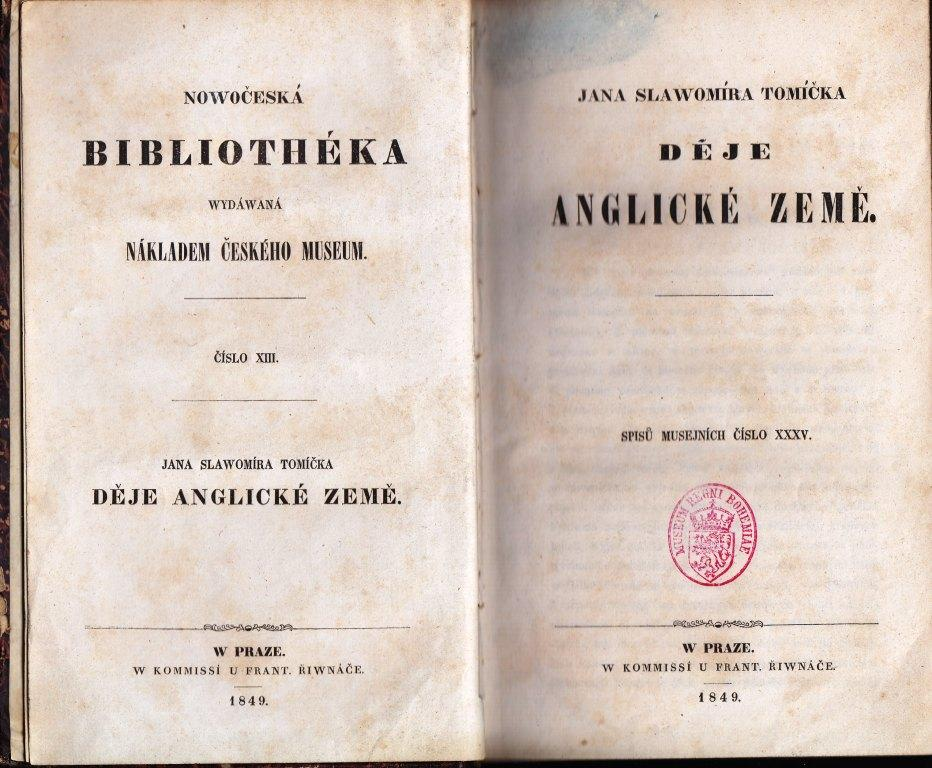
J. S. Tomíček, The History of England

- Slowanka: sbjrka národnjch powěstj (Slavic Woman, A Collection of National Legends), 1833
- Básně od Jana Slavomíra Tomíčka (Poems of Jan Slavomír Tomíček), 1840
- Doba prwního člowěčenstwa, aneb, Auplnější wylíčení stawu prwního pokolení lidského, 1846 (The Age of the First Man, or, A More Complete Portrayal of the State of the First Generations of People; except for using w and au one of the first Czech books to use a more modern orthography and also less luxuriant style which was typical of the first phase of the Czech National Revival)
- Obrazy swěta, čili, Popsání rozličných národů, jejich života způsobů, obyčejů, mravů atd., jakož i rozličných krajin na naší zemi (Pictures of the World, or, Descriptions of Various Nations, Their Customs, Manners and Morals etc., And Also Various Countries of Our World), 1846-7, 5 vols.
- Kawkaz (The Caucasus), 1848
- Česká mluvnice nově vzdělaná (A New Czech Grammar) 1849, again 1863
- Děje anglické země (The History of England), 1849
- Děje Španělské (The History of Spain), 1850
- Pravopis český dle ústrojnosti českého jazyka (Orthography of Czech According to the Structure of the Czech Language), 1850
- Lehrbuch der böhmischen Sprache für Deutsche (A Coursebook of Czech for the Germans), 1851, 1855
- Praktický úvod k rychlému a snadnému naučení se české řeči (Praktischer Lehrgang zur schnellen und leichten Erlernung der böhmischen Sprache; A Practical Introduction to Learning the Czech Language Quickly and Easily), 1854
