= Benigno Ferrera =

Italian cross-country skier

Personal information
- Nationality: Italian
- Born: 30 January 1893; Formazza, Italy
- Died: 24 November 1988 (aged 95); Formazza, Italy

Sport
- Sport: Cross-country skiing

Benigno Ferrera (30 January 1893 – 24 November 1988) was an Italian cross-country skier. He competed in the men's 50 kilometre event at the 1924 Winter Olympics.
