= Achille Bacher =

Italian cross-country skier (1900–1972)

Personal information
- Nationality: Italian
- Born: 27 April 1900; Formazza, Italy
- Died: 2 March 1972 (aged 71); Formazza, Italy

Sport
- Sport: Cross-country skiing

Achille Bacher (27 April 1900 – 2 March 1972) was an Italian cross-country skier. He competed in the men's 18 kilometre event at the 1924 Winter Olympics.
