= Oskar Lindberg (cross-country skier) =

Swedish cross-country skier

Oscar Lindberg (July 5, 1894 in Björknäs, Sweden – October 5, 1977 in Skelleftehamn, Sweden) was a Swedish cross-country skier who competed in the 1924 Winter Olympics.

He came second in the first Vasaloppet in 1922 (after his teammate from IFK Norsjö, Ernst Alm), and won the second race in 1923. In 1924 he finished eighth in the 50 km event.

== Cross-country skiing results ==
=== Olympic Games ===
Year	Age	18 km	50 km
1924	23	—	8
