= Horní Branná =

- Municipality
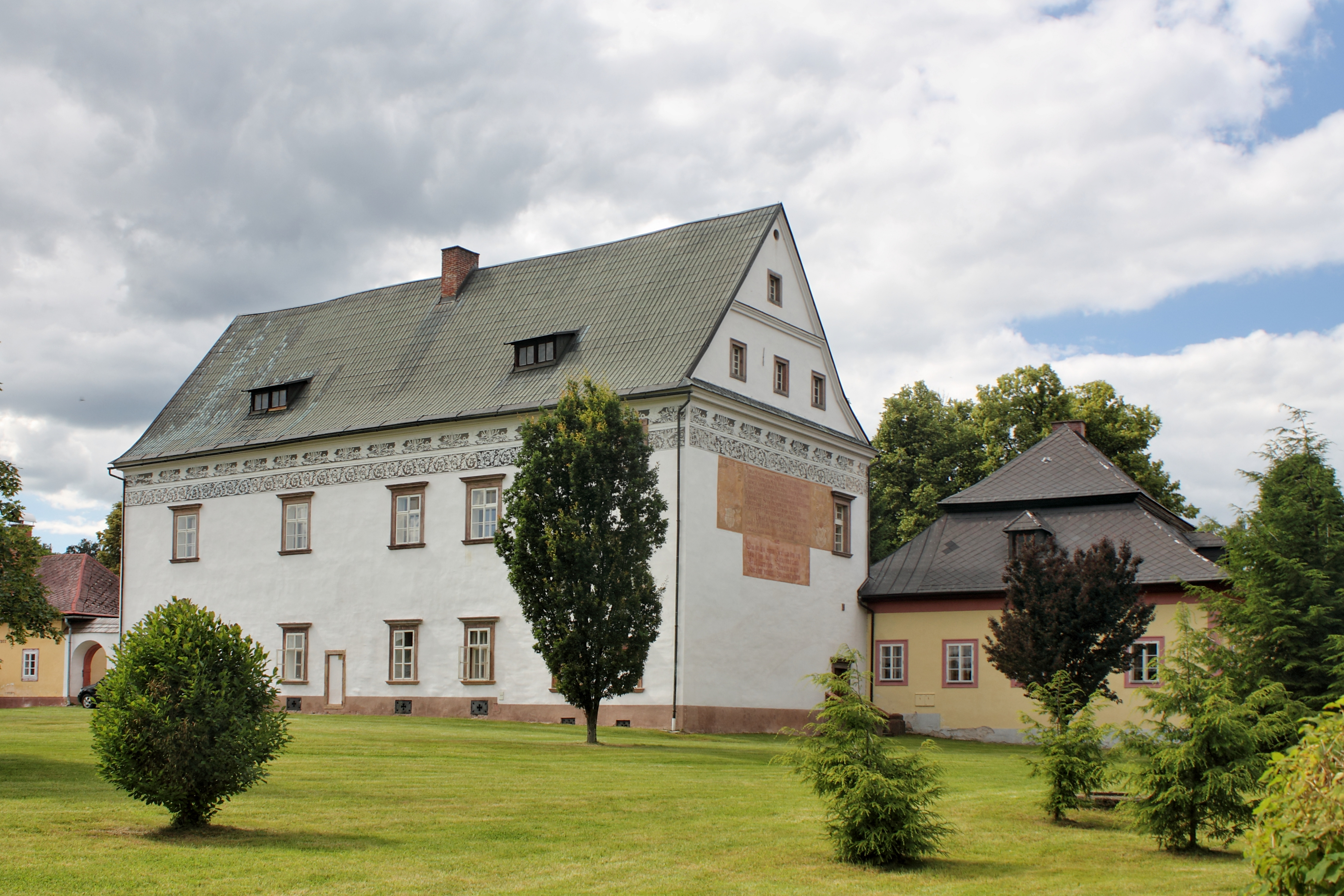
- Horní Branná Castle

- Flag Coat of arms

- Location in the Czech Republic
- Coordinates: 50°36′30″N 15°34′18″E
- Country: Czech Republic
- Region: Liberec
- District: Semily
- First mentioned: 1350

Area
  - Total: 20.86 km^{2} (8.05 sq mi)
- Elevation: 459 m (1,506 ft)

Population (2026-01-01)
  - Total: 1,868
  - Density: 89.55/km^{2} (231.9/sq mi)
- Time zone: UTC+1 (CET)
  - Summer (DST): UTC+2 (CEST)
- Postal codes: 512 36, 514 01
- Website: www.hbranna.cz

Horní Branná (German: Brennei) is a municipality and village in Semily District in the Liberec Region of the Czech Republic. It has about 1,900 inhabitants.

== Administrative division ==
Horní Branná consists of two municipal parts (in brackets population according to the 2021 census):

- Horní Branná (1,298)
- Valteřice (540)

== Etymology ==
The name Branná is derived from the Old Czech adjective brenná, meaning 'muddy (water)'. The prefix horní ('upper') distinguishes the village from neighbouring Dolní Branná ('lower Branná').

== Geography ==
Horní Branná is located about 38 kilometres (24 mi) southeast of Liberec. It lies mostly in the Giant Mountains Foothills, only the northern part of the municipal territory extends into the Giant Mountains. The highest point is at 707 m (2,320 ft) above sea level. The built-up area is situated in the valley of the Sovinka Stream.

== History ==
The first written mention of Horní Branná is in a document of the diocese of Prague, taken in the years 1344–1350. From 1387 to 1606, Horní Branná was owned by the Waldstein family.

== Demographics ==
Historical population

Year	Pop.	±%
1869	3,422	—
1880	3,220	−5.9%
1890	3,249	+0.9%
1900	3,123	−3.9%
1910	3,201	+2.5%

Year	Pop.	±%
1921	2,852	−10.9%
1930	2,804	−1.7%
1950	1,890	−32.6%
1961	1,856	−1.8%
1970	1,732	−6.7%

Year	Pop.	±%
1980	1,665	−3.9%
1991	1,664	−0.1%
2001	1,770	+6.4%
2011	1,801	+1.8%
2021	1,838	+2.1%

Source: Censuses

== Transport ==
The I/14 road (the section from Liberec to Trutnov) runs through the municipality.

Horní Branná is located on the railway line from Trutnov to Kolín.

== Sights ==
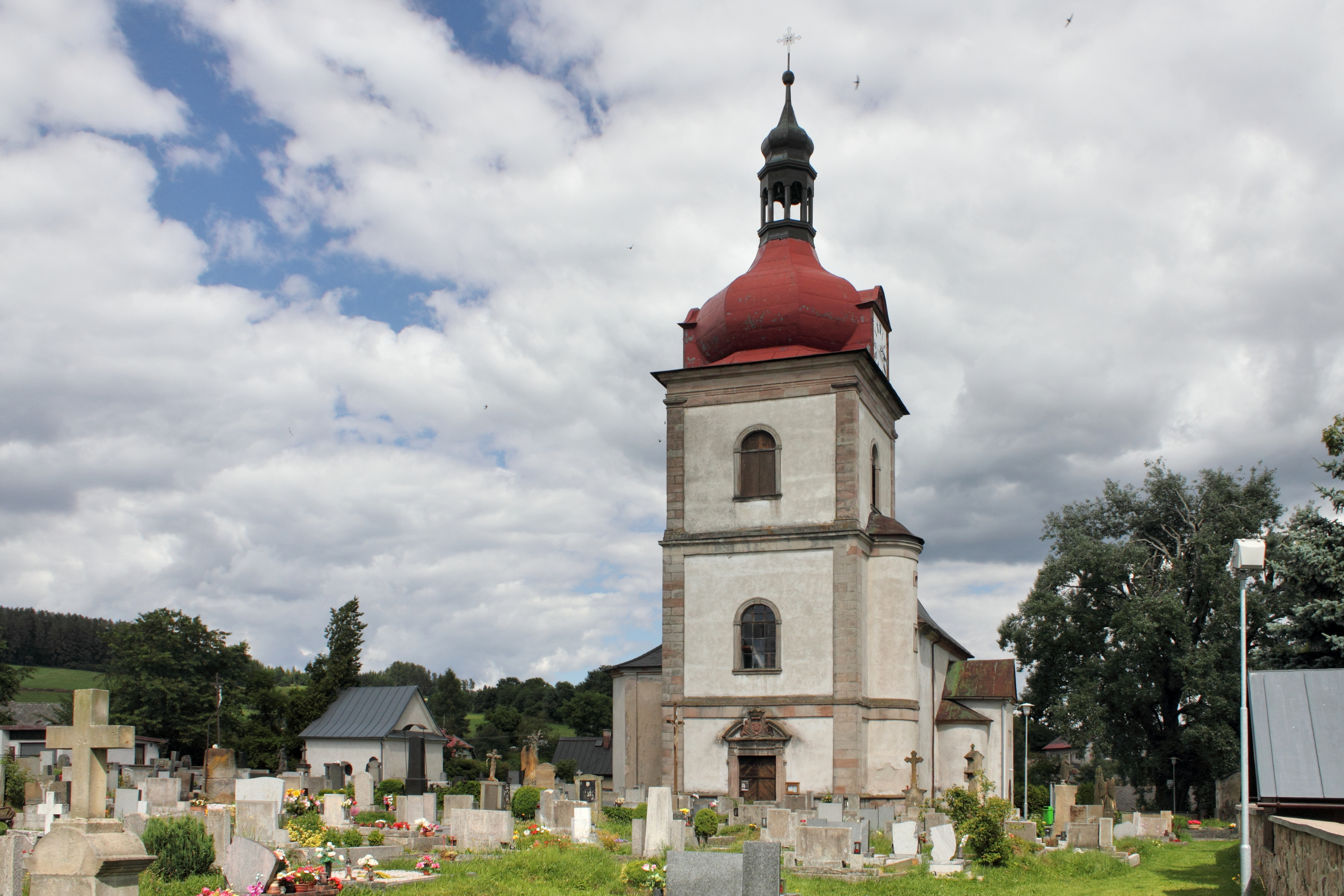
Church of Saint Nicholas

The Church of Saint Nicholas is the oldest church in the Giant Mountains Foothills area. It was built in 1557, when it replaced an old wooden church. The tower was added in 1700.

The Horní Branná Castle was built as a Renaissance aristocratic residence in the second half of the 16th century. The sgraffito decoration dates from 1582. In 1627–1628, Kristina Poniatowská lived on the castle and was visited by John Amos Comenius. Today the building is used for commercial purposes.

The Baroque hospital was built in 1709 by Count Harrach for the count's elderly servants. In 1987, the hospital was demolished and replaced by its copy. Only the original Chapel of Saint Aloysius has been preserved.

== Notable people ==
- Jan Slavomír Tomíček (1806–1866), writer and journalist
- František Hák (1903–?), cross-country skier
- Václav Jón (1905–1966), cross-country skier
- Zdeněk Remsa (1928–2019), ski jumper
- Ilja Matouš (1931–2018), cross-country skier
