= Georg Østerholt =

Norwegian ski jumper

Medal record

Men's ski jumping

World Championships
Bronze medal – third place	1926 Lahti	Individual large hill

Georg Østerholt (13 December 1892 – 20 September 1982) was a Norwegian ski jumper who competed in the 1920s. He won a bronze medal in the individual large hill at the 1926 FIS Nordic World Ski Championships in Lahti.
