= Yugoslavia at the 1924 Winter Olympics =

- Flag of Yugoslavia
- IOC code: YUG
- NOC: Yugoslav Olympic Committee

in Chamonix
- Competitors: 4 in 1 sport
- Medals: Gold 0 Silver 0 Bronze 0 Total 0

Winter Olympics appearances (overview)
- 1924; 1928; 1932; 1936; 1948; 1952; 1956; 1960; 1964; 1968; 1972; 1976; 1980; 1984; 1988; 1992; 1994; 1998; 2002

Other related appearances
- Croatia (1992–pres.); Slovenia (1992–pres.); Bosnia and Herzegovina (1994–pres.); North Macedonia (1998–pres.); Serbia and Montenegro (1998–2006); Montenegro (2010–pres.); Serbia (2010–pres.); Kosovo (2018–pres.)

The Kingdom of Serbs, Croats and Slovenes was represented at the inaugural Winter Olympic Games in 1924 in Chamonix, France with a delegation of four competitors.

== Cross-country skiing ==
Event	Name	Result	Rank
Men's 18 km	Zdenko Švigelj	1:50:27.0	32nd
Men's 18 km	Vladimir Kajzelj	2:00:43.0	34th
Men's 18 km	Dušan Zinaja	2:12:19.4	36th
Men's 18 km	Mirko Pandaković	DNF	–
Men's 50 km	Dušan Zinaja	DNF	–
Men's 50 km	Mirko Pandaković	DNF	–
Men's 50 km	Zdenko Švigelj	DNF	–
Men's 50 km	Vladimir Kajzelj	DNF	–
