= Hans Herrmann (skier) =

Swiss cross-country skier

Personal information
- Nationality: Swiss
- Born: 1892
- Died: April 1968 (aged 75–76)

Sport
- Sport: Cross-country skiing

Hans Herrmann (1892 – April 1968) was a Swiss cross-country skier. He competed in the men's 50 kilometre event at the 1924 Winter Olympics.
