= Giuseppe Ghedina =

Italian cross-country skier

Giuseppe Ghedina (25 October 1898 – 27 September 1986) was an Italian cross-country skier who competed in the 1924 Winter Olympics. He was born in Cortina d'Ampezzo. In 1924 he finished tenth in the 50 kilometre competition. Further results were:

- 1925:
  - 2nd, Italian men's championships of cross-country skiing, 50 km
  - 2nd, Italian men's championships of cross-country skiing, 18 km
