= Szczepan Witkowski =

Polish soldier and skier (1898–1937)

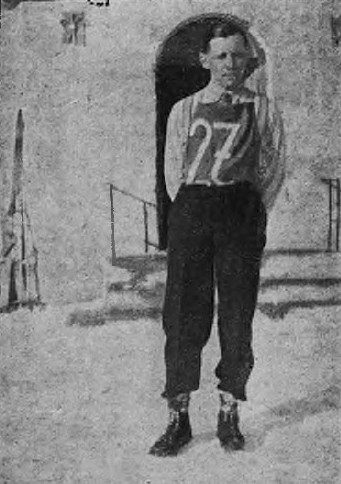

Personal information
- Full name: Szczepan Viktor Witkowski
- Born: 20 December 1898 Lemberg, Austria-Hungary
- Died: 29 May 1937 (aged 38) Stryi, Poland

Sport
- Sport: Skiing

Szczepan Viktor Witkowski (20 December 1898 – 29 May 1937) was a Polish soldier and skier.

Witkowski was born in Lwów, Kingdom of Galicia and Lodomeria (today Lviv, Ukraine). As a gymnasium student, at the age of 15 he volunteered to the front of World War I. Following the war he entered the Pogoń sports club, later changing for Czarni Lwów, where he played as central midfielder. Witkowski also played in the Lwów city football team. He was a member of the national Olympic military patrol team in 1924 which was one of two withdrawing due to bad weather conditions. He also competed in the men's 50 kilometre event at the 1924 Winter Olympics, coming last.

After retiring from sports, Witkowski became an owner of a pension in Slavsko, where he worked as a skiing instructor and founded a local sports club. In 1927 he initiated the construction of a ski jumping ramp in Slavsko, which was built with the financial support of Czarni Lwów and opened during the 1930/31 winter season. Witkowski died of typhus in Stryi (now Ukraine) at the age of 36. An obituary in his memory was published in Gazeta Lwowska.
