= Jacques Chaudron =

French ice hockey player

- Born: 2 June 1889 Paris, France
- Died: 16 June 1969 (aged 80) Paris, France
- Position: Right wing
- National team: France
- Playing career: 1912–1924

Jacques Auguste Chaudron (2 June 1889 – 16 June 1969) was a French ice hockey player. He competed in the men's tournament at the 1924 Winter Olympics.
