= František Hák =

Czech cross-country skier (1903–1987)

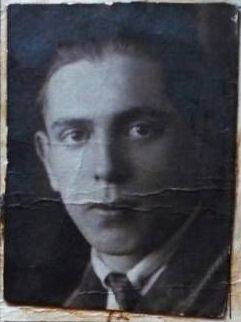

Personal information
- Nationality: Czech
- Born: 5 November 1903; Valteřice (part of Horní Branná), Austria-Hungary
- Died: 16 October 1987 (aged 83)

Sport
- Sport: Cross-country skiing

František Hák (5 November 1903 – 16 October 1987) was a Czech cross-country skier. He competed in the men's 18 kilometre event at the 1924 Winter Olympics, placing 24th.
