= Vladimir Kajzelj =

Slovenian cross-country skier

Personal information
- Nationality: Slovenian
- Born: 5 June 1905; Ljubljana, Austria-Hungary
- Died: 4 June 1972 (aged 66)

Sport
- Sport: Cross-country skiing

Vladimir Kajzelj (5 June 1905 – 4 June 1972) was a Slovenian cross-country skier. He competed in the men's 18 kilometre event at the 1924 Winter Olympics.
