= Václav Jón =

Czech cross-country skier

Personal information
- Nationality: Czech
- Born: 11 March 1905; Valteřice (part of Horní Branná), Austria-Hungary
- Died: 28 December 1966 (aged 61); Horní Branná, Czechoslovakia

Sport
- Sport: Cross-country skiing

Václav Jón (11 March 1905 – 28 December 1966) was a Czech cross-country skier. He competed in the men's 18 kilometre event at the 1924 Winter Olympics.
