= Édouard Pouteil-Noble =

French cross-country skier (1902–1973)

Personal information
- Full name: Édouard Émile Pouteil-Noble
- Nationality: French
- Born: 25 August 1902; Villard-de-Lans, France
- Died: 7 July 1973 (aged 70); Villard-de-Lans, France

Sport
- Sport: Cross-country skiing

Édouard Pouteil-Noble (25 August 1902 – 7 July 1973) was a French cross-country skier. He competed in the men's 50 kilometre event at the 1924 Winter Olympics.
