= Ferenc Németh (cross-country skier) =

Hungarian cross-country skier (1894–1977)

Personal information
- Nationality: Hungarian
- Born: 26 September 1894
- Died: August 1977 (aged 82)

Sport
- Sport: Cross-country skiing

Ferenc Németh (26 September 1894 – August 1977) was a Hungarian cross-country skier. He competed at the 1924 Winter Olympics and the 1928 Winter Olympics.
