= Jan Mittlöhner =

Czechoslovak soldier and skier

Jan Mittlöhner (1902–?) was a Czechoslovak soldier and skier. He competed in military ski patrol at the 1924 Winter Olympics in Chamonix, where the Czechoslovak team placed fourth.
