= Raoul Couvert =

French ice hockey player

- Born: 24 June 1903 Chambéry, France
- Died: 20 February 1983 (aged 79) Chambéry, France
- Position: Right wing
- National team: France
- Playing career: 1923–1934

Raoul François Fernand Robert Couvert (24 June 1903 – 20 February 1983) was a French ice hockey player. He competed in the men's tournaments at the 1924 Winter Olympics and the 1928 Winter Olympics.
