= Adrien Vandelle =

French skier (1902–1976)

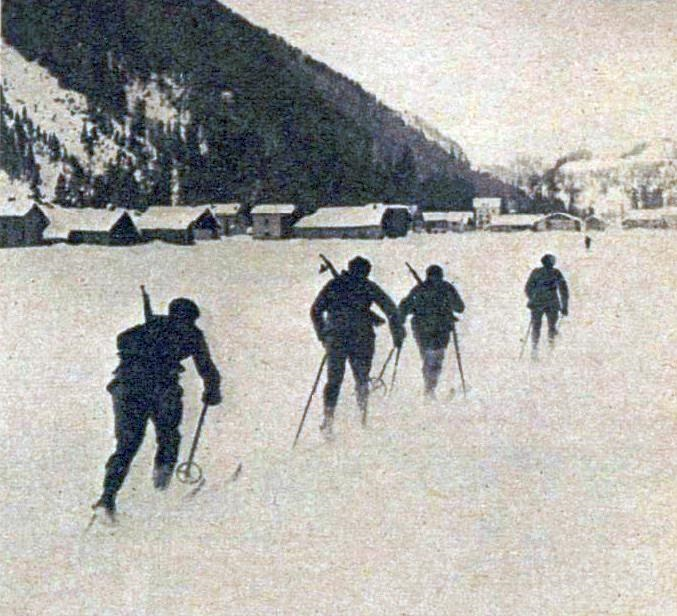
- La patrouille militaire française de ski alpin, troisième des JO de 1924 à Chamonix

Personal information
- Full name: Adrien Louis Albert Vandelle
- Born: 29 August 1902 Les Rousses, France
- Died: 16 October 1976 (aged 74) Les Rousses, France

Sport
- Sport: Skiing
Medal record
Representing France
Men's military patrol
Olympic Games
Bronze medal – third place	1924 Chamonix	Team

Adrien "André" Louis Albert Vandelle (29 August 1902 – 16 October 1976) was a French skier.

Vandelle was ranked third internationally in ski jumping in 1923. As a member of the military patrol team he participated at the 1924 Winter Olympics, which won the bronze medal. Individually, he finished 20th at the Nordic combined event and 29th at the 18 km cross-country skiing competition.
