= Antonio Herin =

Italian cross-country skier

Antoine-Jean-Baptiste Hérin, italianized as Antonio Herin, (13 January 1900 – 2 June 1992) was an Italian cross-country skier.

== Career ==
Originally from Valtournenche, Herin finished 13th at the 1924 Winter Olympics in Chamonix at the competition of 18-km-cross-country skiing.
