= Charles Lavaivre =

French ice hockey player

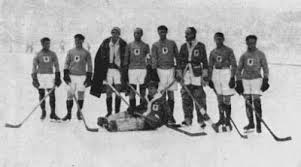
- Born: 14 February 1905; Chamonix Mont-Blanc, France
- Died: 20 March 1967 (aged 62); Chamonix Mont-Blanc, France
- Position: Goaltender
- National team: France
- Playing career: 1923–1924

Charles Lavaivre (February 14, 1905 – March 20, 1967) was a French ice hockey player who competed in the 1924 Winter Olympics.

In 1924 he participated with the French ice hockey team in the Olympic tournament.
