= Jean-Joseph Monnard =

French ice hockey player

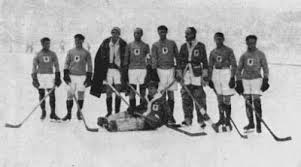
- Born: 11 February 1901 Chamonix Mont-Blanc, France
- Died: 3 February 1973 (aged 71) Chamonix Mont-Blanc, France
- Position: Right wing
- National team: France
- Playing career: 1922–1927

Jean-Joseph Henri "Bobby" Monnard (February 11, 1901 – February 3, 1973) was a French ice hockey player who competed in the 1924 Winter Olympics.

== Career ==
In 1924, he participated with the French ice hockey team in the Olympic tournament.
