= André Blusset =

French cross-country skier (1904–1994)

Personal information
- Full name: André Alfred Blusset
- Nationality: French
- Born: 17 January 1904; Villard-de-Lans, France
- Died: 17 July 1994 (aged 90); Grenoble, France

Sport
- Sport: Cross-country skiing

André Blusset (17 January 1904 – 17 July 1994) was a French cross-country skier. He competed in the men's 50 kilometre event at the 1924 Winter Olympics.
