= Charles Payot =

French ice hockey player

- Born: 21 April 1901 Verrayes, Italy
- Position: Left wing
- National team: France
- Playing career: 1922–1929

Calixte "Charles" Payot (pronounced [ʃaʁl pajo]; born 21 April 1901 in Verrayes; date of death unknown) was a French ice hockey player. He competed in the men's tournaments at the 1924 Winter Olympics and the 1928 Winter Olympics.
