= Mirko Pandaković =

Croatian cross-country skier (1895–1962)

Personal information
- Nationality: Croatian
- Born: 19 August 1895; Nova Gradiška, Croatia-Slavonia, Austria-Hungary (now Croatia)
- Died: 29 September 1962 (aged 67); Brunate, Italy

Sport
- Sport: Cross-country skiing

Mirko Pandaković (19 August 1895 – 29 September 1962) was a Croatian cross-country skier. He competed in the men's 18 kilometre event at the 1924 Winter Olympics.
