= Camille Médy =

French cross-country skier (1902–1989)

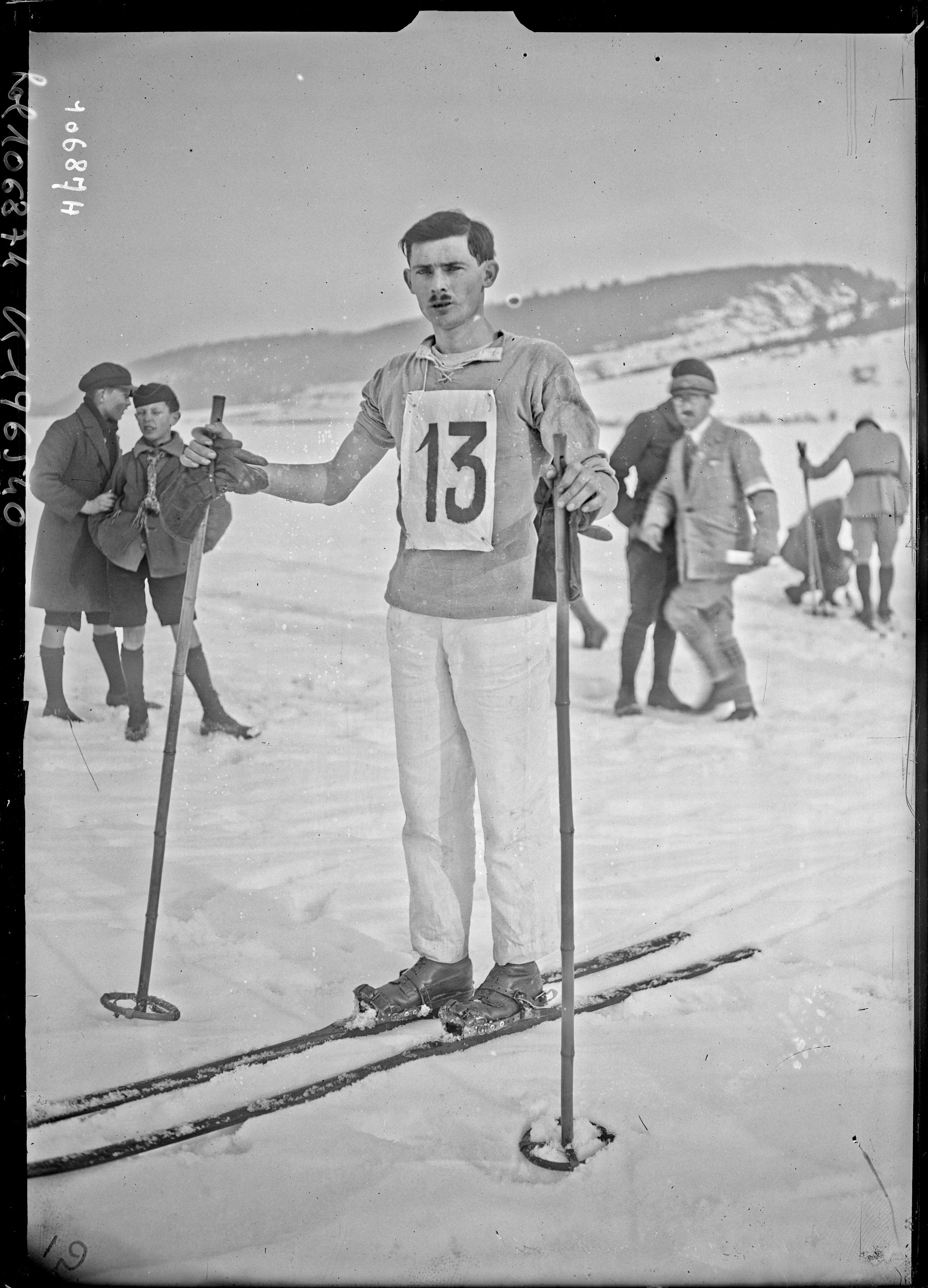

Personal information
- Full name: Camille André Médy
- Nationality: French
- Born: 24 December 1902 Gérardmer, France
- Died: 28 May 1989 (aged 86) Gérardmer, France

Sport
- Sport: Cross-country skiing

Camille Médy (24 December 1902 – 28 May 1989), whose full name is André Camille Médy, was a French cross-country skier. He competed at the 1924 Winter Olympics and the 1928 Winter Olympics.
