= Camille Mandrillon =

French biathlete (1891–1969)

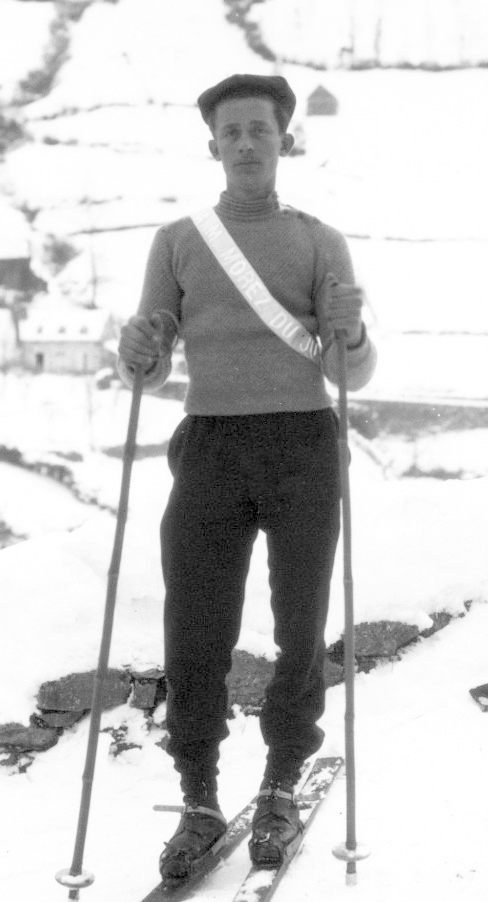
- Camille Mandrillon in 1910

Personal information
- Full name: Paul Camille Albert Mandrillon
- Born: 6 September 1891 Les Rousses, France
- Died: 22 March 1969 (aged 77) La Tronche, France

Sport
- Sport: Skiing
Medal record
Representing France
Olympic Games
Bronze medal – third place	1924 Chamonix	Military patrol, team

Paul Camille Albert Mandrillon (6 September 1891 – 22 March 1969) was a French biathlete who competed in the early 1920s. At the 1924 Winter Olympics he won the bronze medal in the military patrol event, together with his younger brother Maurice; he was also the flag bearer of the French delegation, and took the Olympic Oath, the first for the Winter Olympics.
