= Anton Gottstein =

Czech cross-country skier

Personal information
- Nationality: Czech
- Born: 7 December 1893 Hořejší Vrchlabí, Bohemia, Austria-Hungary
- Died: 22 August 1982 (aged 88) Vrchlabí, Czechoslovakia

Sport
- Sport: Cross-country skiing

Anton Gottstein (7 December 1893 – 22 August 1982) was a Czech cross-country skier. He competed for Czechoslovakia in the men's 18 kilometre event at the 1924 Winter Olympics.
