= Gilbert Ravanel =

French skier (1900–1983)

Personal information
- Full name: Édouard Gilbert Ravanel
- Nationality: French
- Born: 26 April 1900 Chamonix-Mont-Blanc, France
- Died: 1 September 1983 (aged 83) Chamonix-Mont-Blanc, France

Sport
- Sport: Cross-country skiing

Gilbert Ravanel (26 April 1900 – 1 September 1983) was a French skier. He competed at the 1924 Winter Olympics.
