= Štěpán Hevák =

Czech cross-country skier

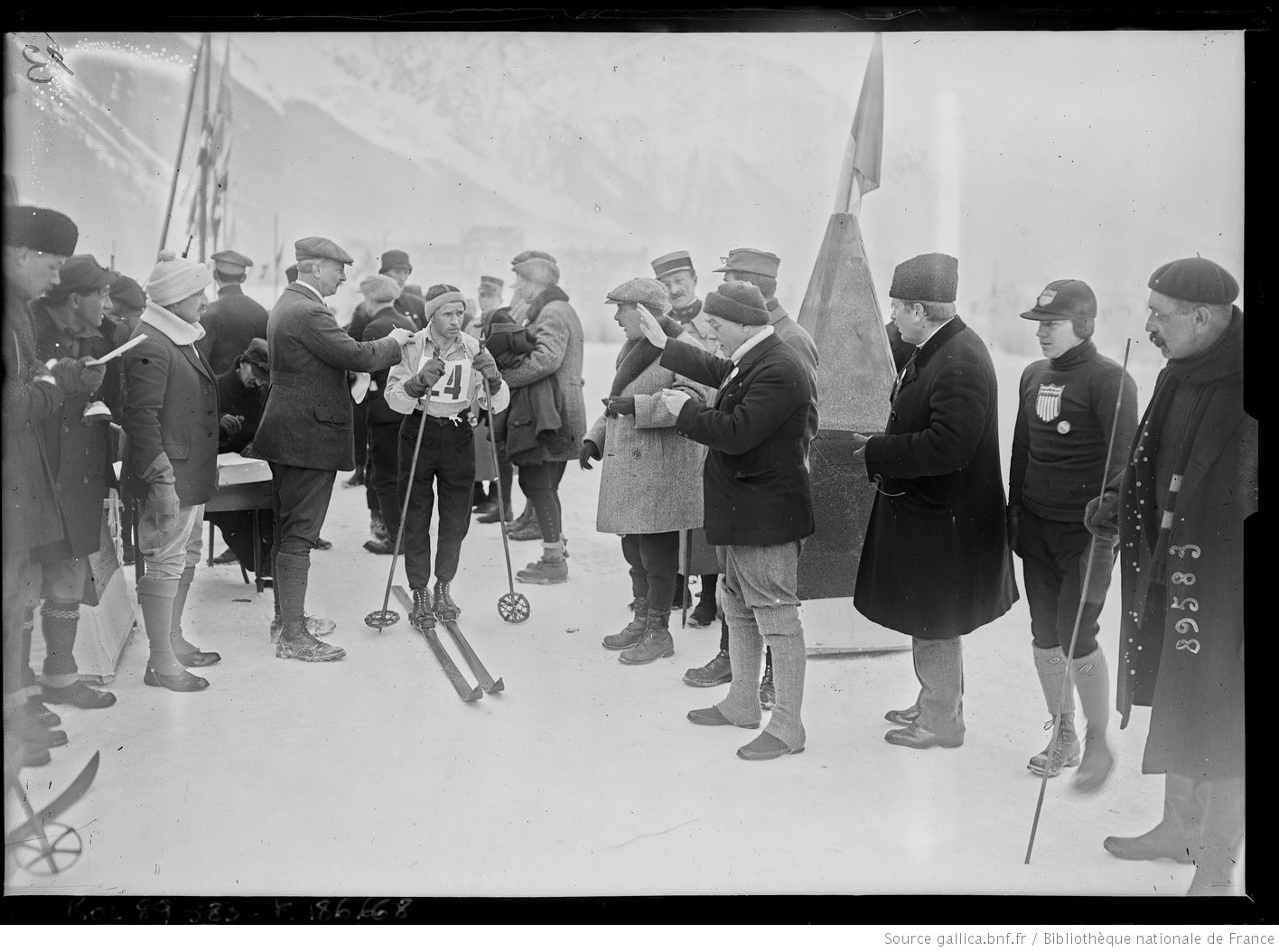
- Štefan Hevák at the 1924 Winter Olympics

Personal information
- Nationality: Czech
- Born: 1896; Jilemnice, Austria-Hungary
- Died: 1944 (aged 47–48); Prague, Protectorate of Bohemia and Moravia

Sport
- Sport: Cross-country skiing

Štěpán Hevák (1896–1944) was a Czech cross-country skier. He competed in the men's 18 kilometre event at the 1924 Winter Olympics.
