= Zdenko Švigelj =

Slovenian cross-country skier

Personal information
- Nationality: Slovenian
- Born: 23 October 1902; Ljubljana, Austria-Hungary
- Died: 15 August 1990 (aged 87)

Sport
- Sport: Cross-country skiing

Zdenko Švigelj (23 October 1902 – 15 August 1990) was a Slovenian cross-country skier. He competed in the men's 18 kilometre event at the 1924 Winter Olympics.
