= Denis Couttet =

French cross-country skier (1900–1956)

Personal information
- Full name: François Denis Couttet
- Nationality: French
- Born: 26 February 1900; Chamonix, France
- Died: 30 August 1956 (aged 56); Chamonix, France

Sport
- Sport: Cross-country skiing

Denis Couttet (26 February 1900 – 30 August 1956) was a French cross-country skier. He competed in the men's 18 kilometre event at the 1924 Winter Olympics.
