= Philippe Payot =

French ice hockey player

- Born: December 21, 1893 Chamonix, France
- Died: April 29, 1958 (aged 64) Chamonix, France
- Position: Defence
- National team: France
- Playing career: 1920–1929

Joseph Philippe Payot (pronounced [filip pajo]; December 21, 1893 – April 29, 1958) was a French ice hockey player who competed in the 1924 Winter Olympics and in the 1928 Winter Olympics.

In 1924, he participated with the French ice hockey team in the Olympic tournament.

Four years later, he was also a member of the French team in the 1928 Olympic tournament.
