= Maurice Mandrillon =

French skier (1902–1981)

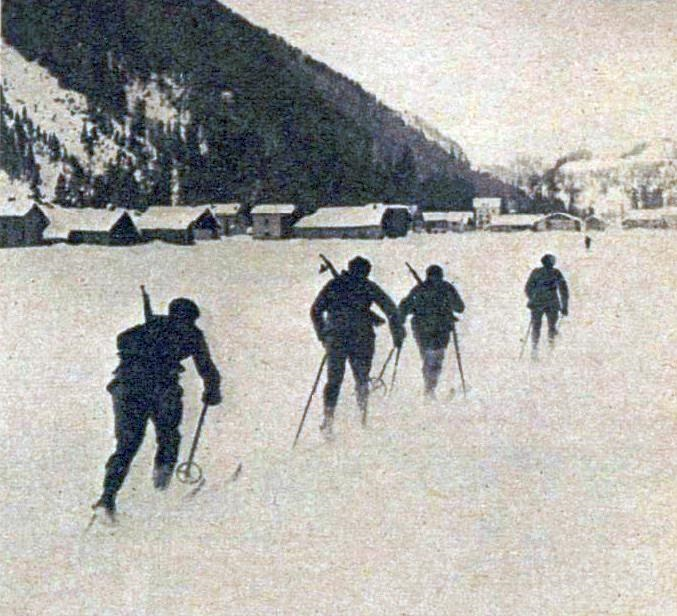

Personal information
- Full name: Gabriel Maurice Mandrillon
- Born: 23 August 1902 Les Rousses, France
- Died: 11 February 1981 (aged 78) Lons-le-Saunier, France

Sport
- Sport: Skiing
Medal record
Representing France
Men's military patrol
Olympic Games
| Bronze medal – third place | 1924 Chamonix | Team |

Gabriel Maurice Mandrillon (23 August 1902 – 11 February 1981) was a French skier. He was the brother of Camille Mandrillon.

Mandrillon was born in Les Rousses. In 1923, he was fourth in the international ranking of ski jumping. He was a member of the national Olympic military patrol team in 1924 which placed third. At the 1928 Winter Olympics he finished 33rd at the 18 km cross-country skiing event. He died in Lons-le-Saunier.
