= Martial Payot =

French skier (1900–1949)

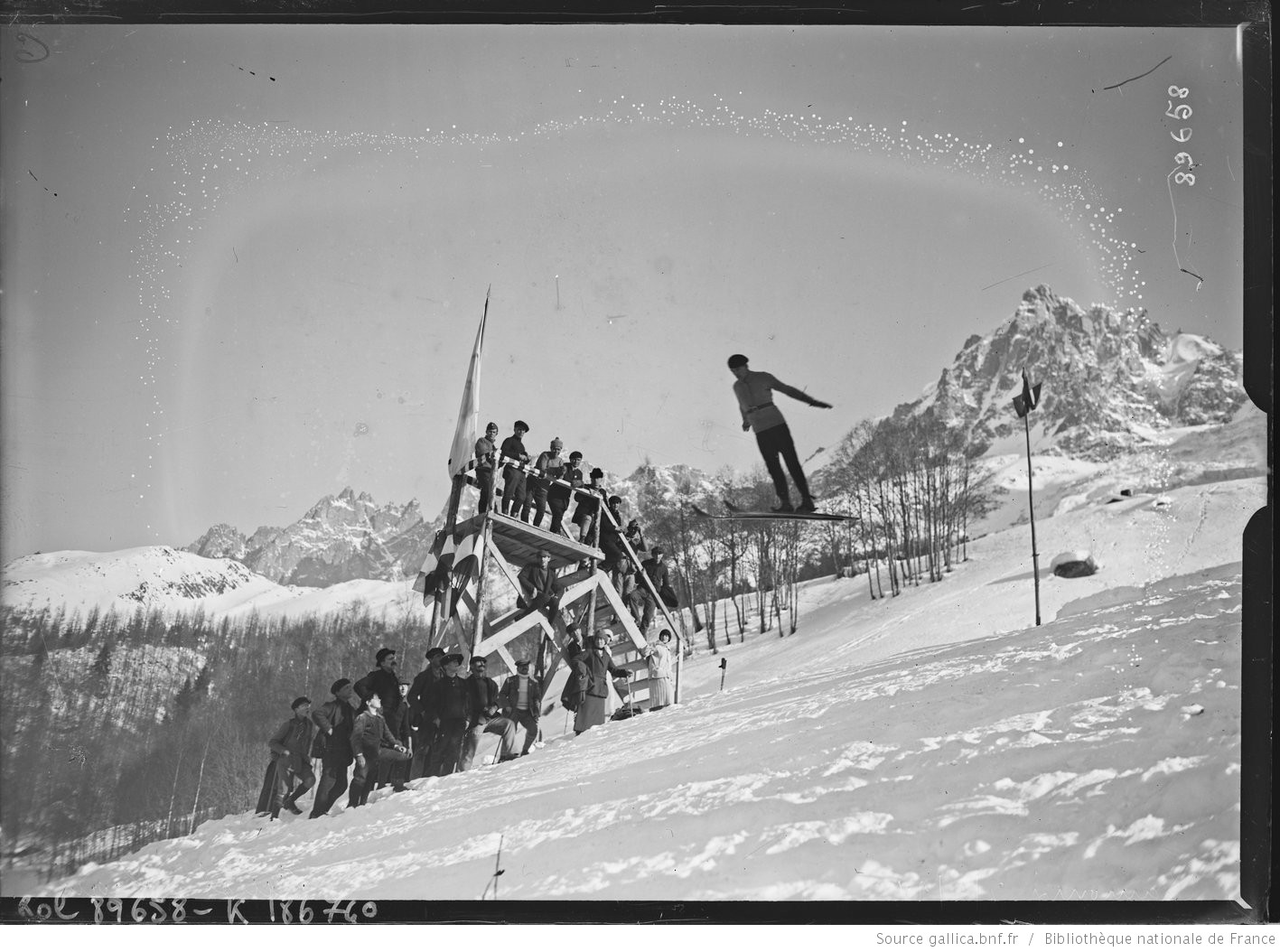
- Martial Payot at the 1924 Winter Olympics

Personal information
- Full name: Martial Alphonse Alexandre Payot
- Nationality: French
- Born: 18 February 1900 Chamonix, France
- Died: 13 October 1949 (aged 49) Chamonix, France

Sport
- Sport: Skiing

Martial Payot (pronounced [maʁtjal pajo]; 18 February 1900 – 13 October 1949) was a French skier. He competed at the 1924 Winter Olympics and the 1928 Winter Olympics.
