= Biathlon =

Winter sport of skiing and rifle shooting

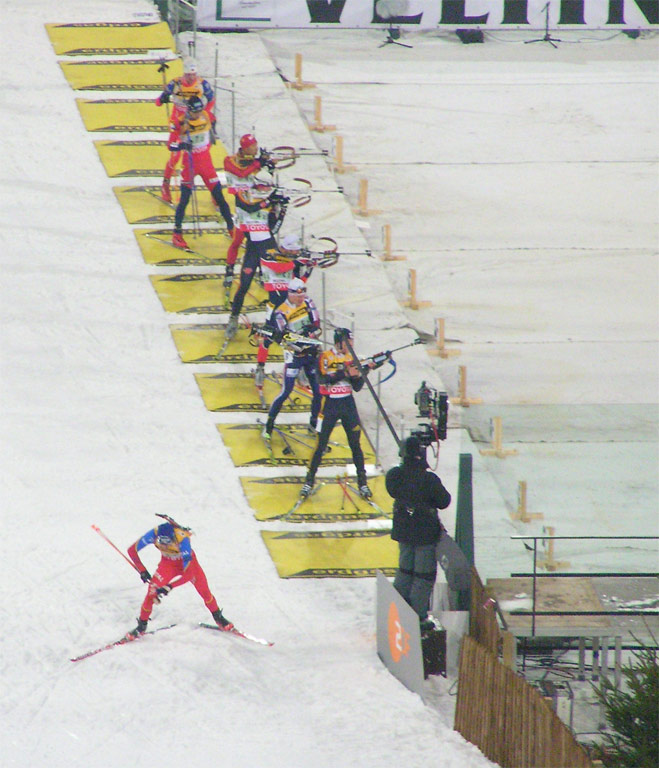
- Biathletes in the shooting area of a competition
- Highest governing body: Military patrol (1920–1953) / UIPMB (Union de Pentathlon Moderne et Biathlon) (1953–1993) / International Biathlon Union since 1993

Characteristics
- Team members: Single competitors or relay teams
- Mixed-sex: Yes
- Equipment: Skis, poles, rifle

Presence
- Olympic: 1924 (military patrol); 1960 (officially)

Biathlon is a winter sport that combines cross-country skiing and rifle shooting. It developed from the sport of military patrol, which began in 19th century Scandinavia and originated in ski warfare. In the Nordic languages, the sport is called "ski-shooting". The sport of biathlon involves many different types of races, with the commonality being contestants skiing through a cross-country trail whose distance is divided into shooting rounds called bouts. The shooting rounds do not have a time limit, but depending on the competition, missed shots result in extra distance or time being added to the contestant's total.

== History ==
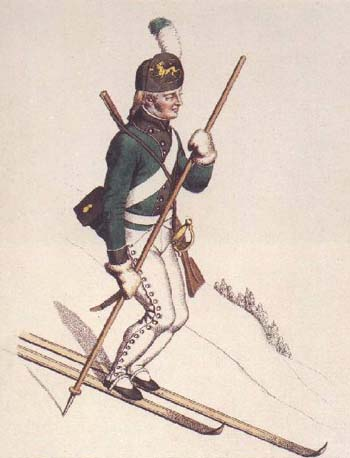
Norwegian ski-soldier (drawing published in 1811)

According to Encyclopædia Britannica, biathlon "is rooted in the skiing traditions of Scandinavia, where early inhabitants revered the Norse god Ullr as both the ski god and the hunting god." In modern times, the activity that developed into this sport was an exercise for Norwegians as alternative training for the military. Norwegian skiing regiments organized military skiing contests in the 18th century, divided into four classes: shooting at mark while skiing at top speed, downhill race among trees, downhill race on big hills without falling, and a long race on flat ground while carrying a rifle and military pack. In modern terminology, these military contests included downhill, slalom, biathlon, and cross-country skiing. One of the world's first known ski clubs, Trysil Skytte- og Skiløberforening (the Trysil Rifle and Ski Club), was formed in Norway in 1861 to promote national defense at the local level. 20th century variants include Forsvarsrennet (the military contest), a 17 km cross-country race with shooting, and the military cross-country race at 30 km including marksmanship.

The modern biathlon is a civilian variant of the old military combined exercise. In Norway, the biathlon was, until 1984, a branch of Det frivillige Skyttervesen, an organization set up by the government to promote civilian marksmanship in support of national defence. In Norwegian, the biathlon is called skiskyting (literally ski shooting). In Norway, there are still separate contests in skifeltskyting, a cross-country race at 12 km with large-caliber rifle shooting at various targets with unknown range.

Called military patrol, the combination of skiing and shooting was contested at the Winter Olympic Games in 1924 and then demonstrated in 1928, 1936, and 1948, during which time Norway and Finland were strong competitors. In 1948, the sport was reorganized under the Union Internationale de Pentathlon Moderne et Biathlon and became re-accepted as an Olympic sport in 1955, with widespread popularity within the Soviet and Swedish winter sport circuits.

The first Biathlon World Championship was held in 1958 in Austria, and in 1960 the sport was finally included in the Olympic Games. At Albertville in 1992, women were first allowed in the Olympic biathlon. The pursuit format was added for the 2002 Salt Lake City Winter Olympics, and the IBU added mixed relay as a format for the 2006 Olympics.

The competitions from 1958 to 1965 made use of high-power centrefire cartridges, such as the .30-06 Springfield and the 7.62×51mm NATO, before the .22 long rifle rimfire cartridge was standardized in 1978. The ammunition was carried in several pouches on a belt worn around the competitor's waist. The sole event was the men's 20 km individual, encompassing four separate ranges and firing distances of 100 m, 150 m, 200 m, and 250 m. The target distance was reduced to 150 m with the addition of the relay in 1966. The shooting range was further reduced to 50 m in 1978 with the mechanical self-indicating targets making their debut at the 1980 Winter Olympics in Lake Placid. For the 2018–2019 season, fully electronic targets were approved as an alternative to paper targets used in zeroing or mechanical steel targets for IBU events.

== Governing body ==
In 1948, the International Modern Pentathlon Union (UIPM) was founded to standardize the rules for the modern pentathlon and from 1953 also biathlon. In July 1993, the biathlon branch of the UIPMB created the International Biathlon Union (IBU), which officially separated from the UIPMB in 1998.

Presidents of the UIPMB/IBU:

- 1947–1949: Tom Wiborn (Sweden)
- 1949–1960: Gustaf Dyrssen (Sweden)
- 1960–1988: Sven Thofelt (Sweden)
- 1988–1992: Igor Novikov (USSR/Russia)
- 1992–2018: Anders Besseberg (Norway)
- Since 2018: Olle Dahlin (Sweden)

== Championships ==
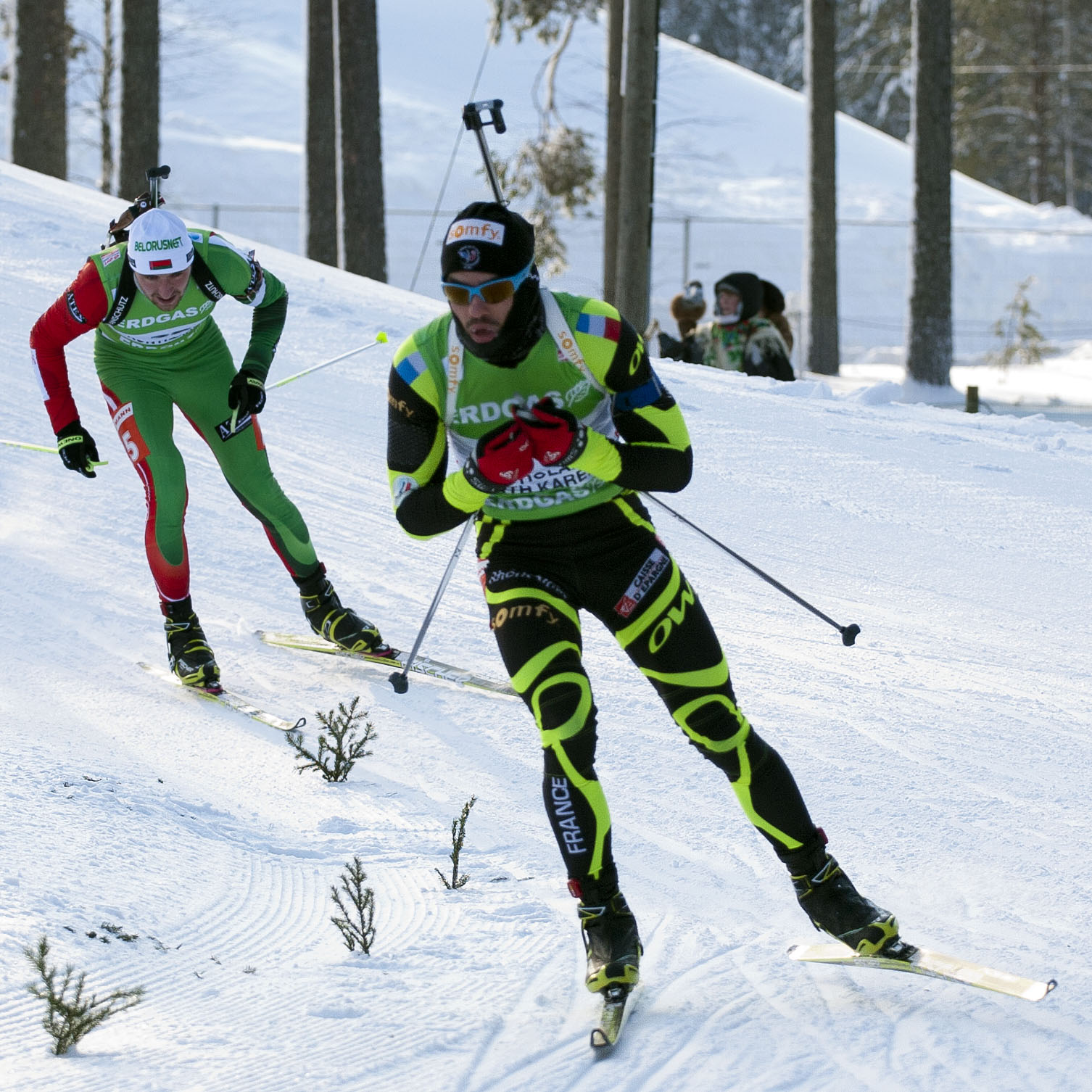
Transition from downhill at the 2012 World Cup in Kontiolahti

The following articles list major international biathlon events and medalists. Unlike the Olympics and World Championships (BWCH), the World Cup (BWC) is an entire winter season of (mostly) weekly races, where the medalists are those with the highest sums of World Cup points at the end of the season.

- Biathlon at the Winter Olympics
- Biathlon World Championships
- Biathlon World Cup
- Biathlon European Championships
- IBU Cup
- Biathlon Junior World Championships
- Biathlon at the Winter Universiade

== Rules and equipment ==
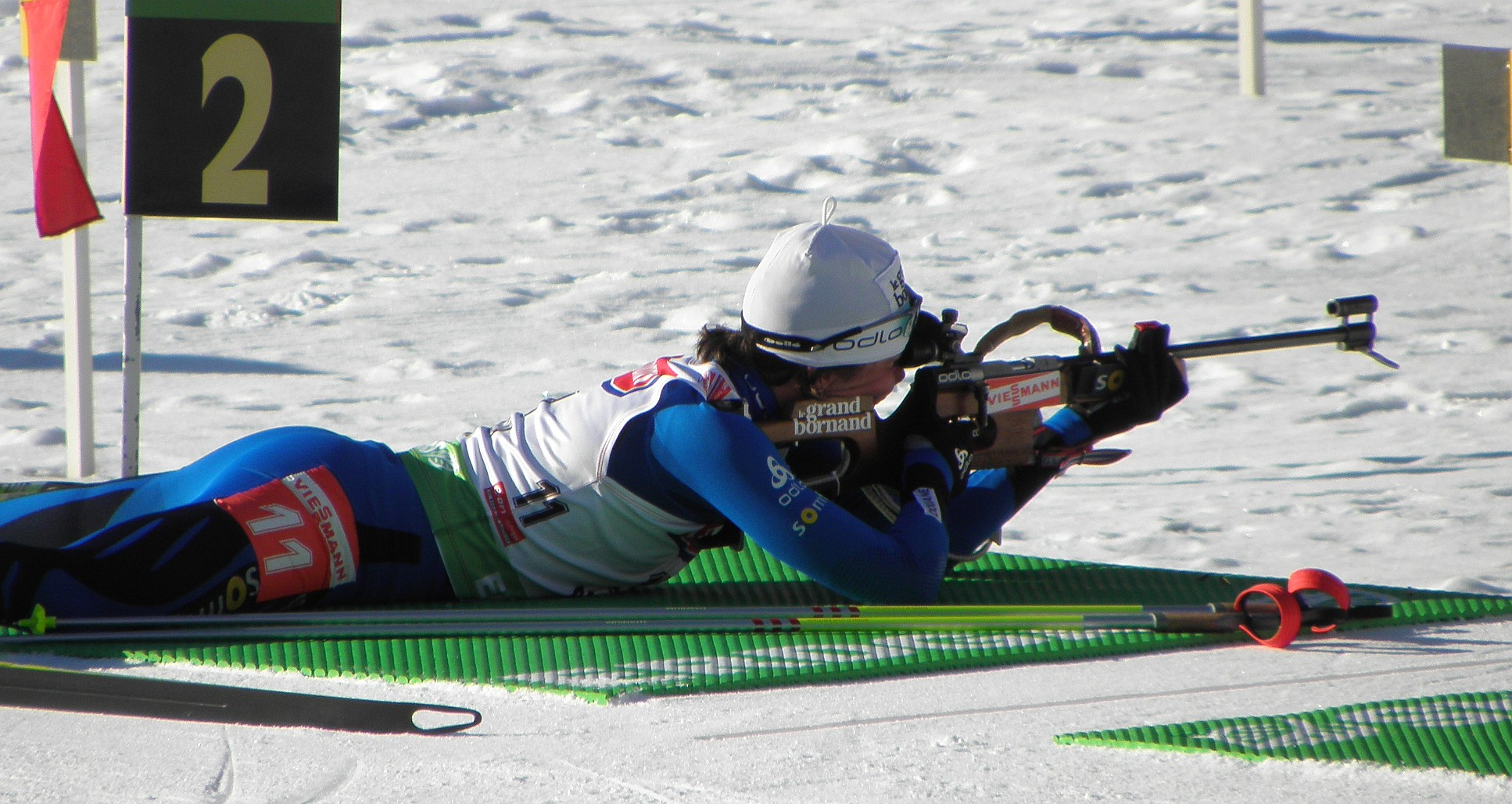
Prone position

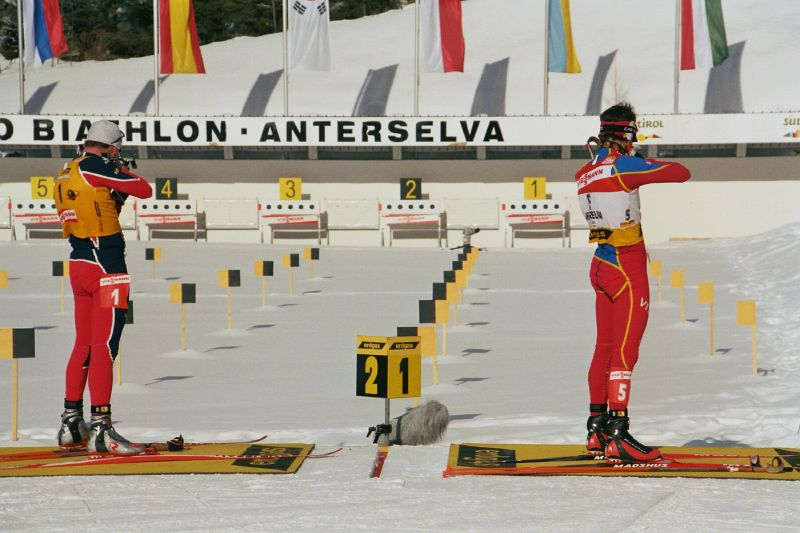
Standing position

The rules of the biathlon are given in the International Biathlon Union Competition Rules and the Annexes to the Event and Competition Rules which are updated by the IBU yearly.

=== Basic concepts ===
A biathlon competition consists of a race in which contestants ski a series of loops on a cross-country trail system and includes either two or four shooting rounds called bouts, half in the prone position, the other half in the standing position. Depending on the shooting performance, extra distance or time is added to the contestant's total skiing distance/time. Depending on the event the contestant with the shortest total time or first to cross the finish line wins.

For each shooting bout, the biathlete must hit the five targets or receive a penalty for each missed target, which varies according to the competition rules as follows:

- Skiing around a 150 m (490 ft) or 75 m (246 ft) penalty loop.
- Adding a 1 minute or 45 second penalty to the skier's total time.
- Use of an extra cartridge (held on a spare round holder on an athlete's rifle) to hit the target; only three such "spare rounds" are available for each shooting stage (bout), and a penalty loop must be done for each target remaining. These rounds are only available in the relay race.

In order to keep track of the contestants' progress and relative standing throughout a race, split times (intermediate times) are taken at several points along the skiing track and upon finishing each shooting bout. The large display screens commonly set up at biathlon arenas, as well as the information graphics shown as part of the TV picture, will typically list the split time of the fastest contestant at each intermediate point and the times and time differences to the closest runners-up.

=== Skiing details ===
At Olympic competitions, all cross-country skiing techniques are permitted in the biathlon, allowing the use of skate skiing, which is overwhelmingly the choice of competitors. The minimum ski length is the height of the skier minus 4 cm. The rifle has to be carried by the skier during the race by use of a harness and must be taken off during the shooting stages.

=== Shooting details ===
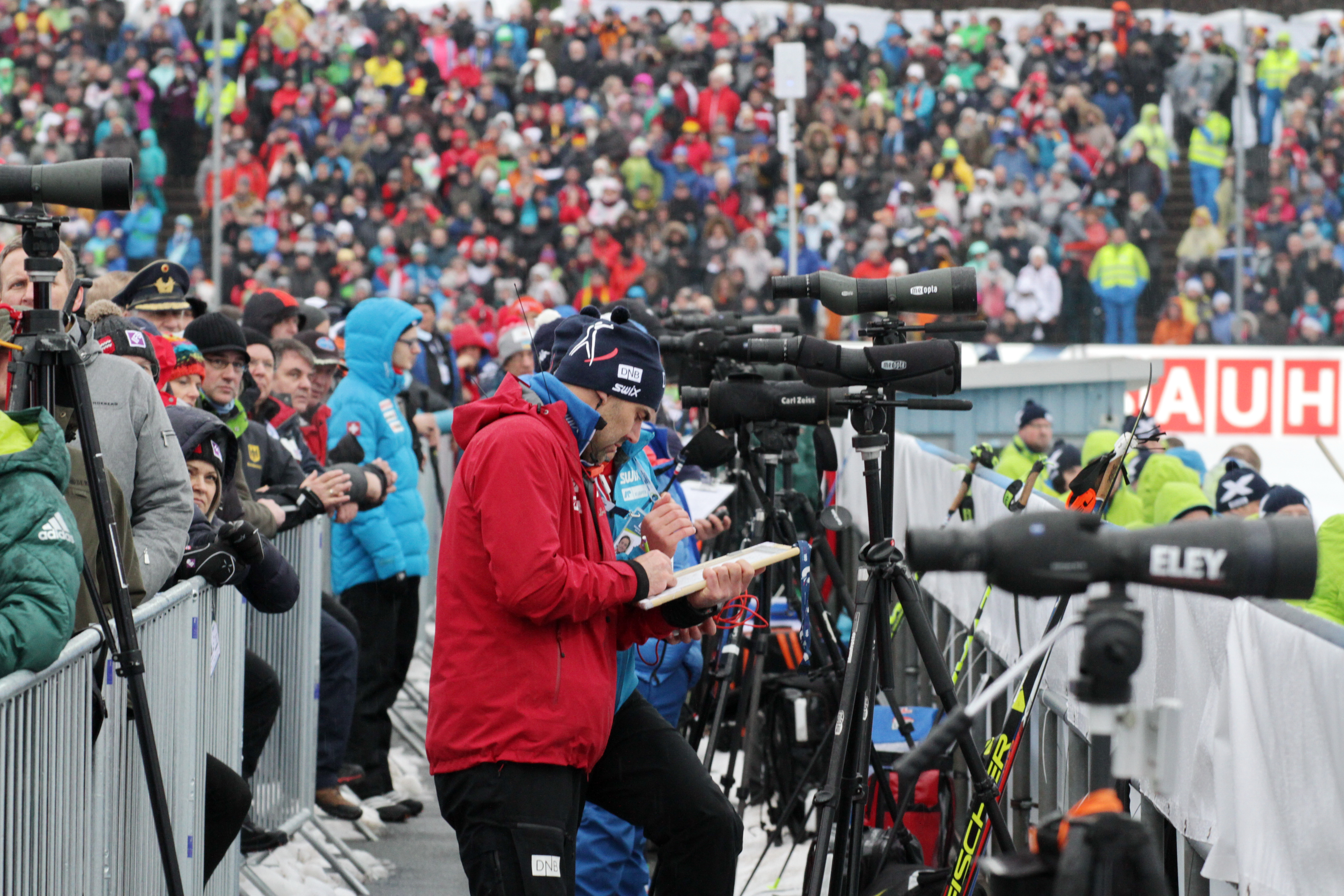
Biathlon coaches use spotting scopes to verify and optimize team-member shot placement.

Competitors carry a rifle chambered in the 5.6 mm 22 long rifle caliber (.22 LR), which must weigh at least 3.5 kg (7.7 lb), excluding spare ammunition, and loaded or empty magazines. The guns use .22 LR ammunition which must have a bullet with a weight of 2.55–2.75 grams (39.35–42.43 grains) made of lead or a similar uniform soft material and use a bolt action or Anschütz 1827F Fortner (or other straight-pull bolt) action. Each rifle holds 4 magazines using a magazine cassette (holds all 4) or a magazine holder (holds one) mounted to the rifle or available internally, with 5 rounds each. Additional rounds can be kept on the stock of the rifle for a relay race using what is called a spare round holder. Spare rounds can also be stored on the floor plate of the magazine. Spare round holders come in many configurations holding 2, 3, or 6 rounds of ammunition and are mounted in various places in the rifle stock depending on biathlete preferences. Additionally spare round compartments are sometimes built into sight risers, cheek pieces or the standing grip of the rifle's stock.

The targets sit at a distance of 50 m (55 yd). There are five concentric, circular, shooting targets to be hit in each shooting round or bout. When shooting in the prone position, the target diameter is 45 mm (1.8 in); when shooting in the standing position, the target diameter is 115 mm (4.5 in). This translates to angular target sizes of 0.9 and 2.3 mrad respectively. A large assembly of 5 targets sits in each lane. When changing from prone targets to standing, the hit size or scoring zone of the target changes, but the size of the bull at which the biathlete aims remains unaltered. This means that the perceived target size remains the same while the "hit-zone" the biathlete's bullet must strike to achieve a hit decreases in the prone position when compared to the standing. The setting of these targets is either done with a pull rope (as is done on mechanical targets) or by use of a wireless remote (as is done on electronic targets). On biathlon ranges, a white paddle covers a hit target by using either the momentum of the bullet to flip a paddle or an acoustic system to determine the shot location. This white indication method gives the biathlete, as well as the spectators, instant visual feedback for each shot fired.

Ear protection is not required or generally used during biathlon shooting as the ammunition used is usually subsonic. An eyecup (blinder) is an optional feature of biathlon rifles.

== Competition format ==
=== Individual ===
The 20 km (12.43 mi) individual race [15 km (9.32 mi) for women] is the oldest biathlon event; the distance is skied over five laps. The biathlete performs four bouts or shooting stages at any shooting lane (lanes 1–15 are in prone, while lanes 16–30 are for standing), in the order of prone, standing, prone, standing, totaling 20 targets. For each missed target, a fixed penalty time, usually 1 minute, is added to the skiing time of the biathlete. Competitors' starts are staggered, normally by 30 seconds.

A variation of the standard individual race, called short individual, was introduced during the 2018–19 Biathlon IBU Cup. The races are 15 km for men and 12.5 km for women (the same distances as in the mass start), and for each missed target, 45 seconds will be added to the skiing time.

=== Sprint ===
The sprint is 10 km (6.21 mi) for men and 7.5 km (4.66 mi) for women; the distance is skied over three laps. The biathlete performs two bouts or shooting stages at a lane of their choosing, once in the prone position (usually lanes 1–15) and once in the standing position (lanes 16–30), for a total of 10 shots. Most races designate these lanes for their positions in what is called a "split range". The division of these lanes is marked with a pictorial sign showing an arrow and a representation of the designated position. For each missed shot, a penalty loop of 150 m must be skied before continuing the race. As in the individual competition, the biathletes start in a set of equal intervals as set by the race director.

=== Super Sprint ===
Introduced at the 2017–18 Biathlon IBU Cup, the Super Sprint is a shorter version of the sprint race. Unlike the traditional sprint race, the Super Sprint is divided into two segments – qualification and final. The qualification is done like the traditional sprint, but on a 1.5 km lap with a total length of 4.5 km. Only the top 30 competitors qualify for the final, in which all competitors start simultaneously and do five laps on a 2.5 course (like in mass start) with a total race length of 7.5 km. Course lengths are the same for women and men. For each missed shot, athletes must ski a penalty loop of 75 m.

The format was removed from the winter IBU calendar prior to the 2023 season due to criticism from athletes that results did not reflect athletes' actual ability. However, it is used in summer biathlon events such as Blinkfestivalen and Loop One Festival.

=== Pursuit ===
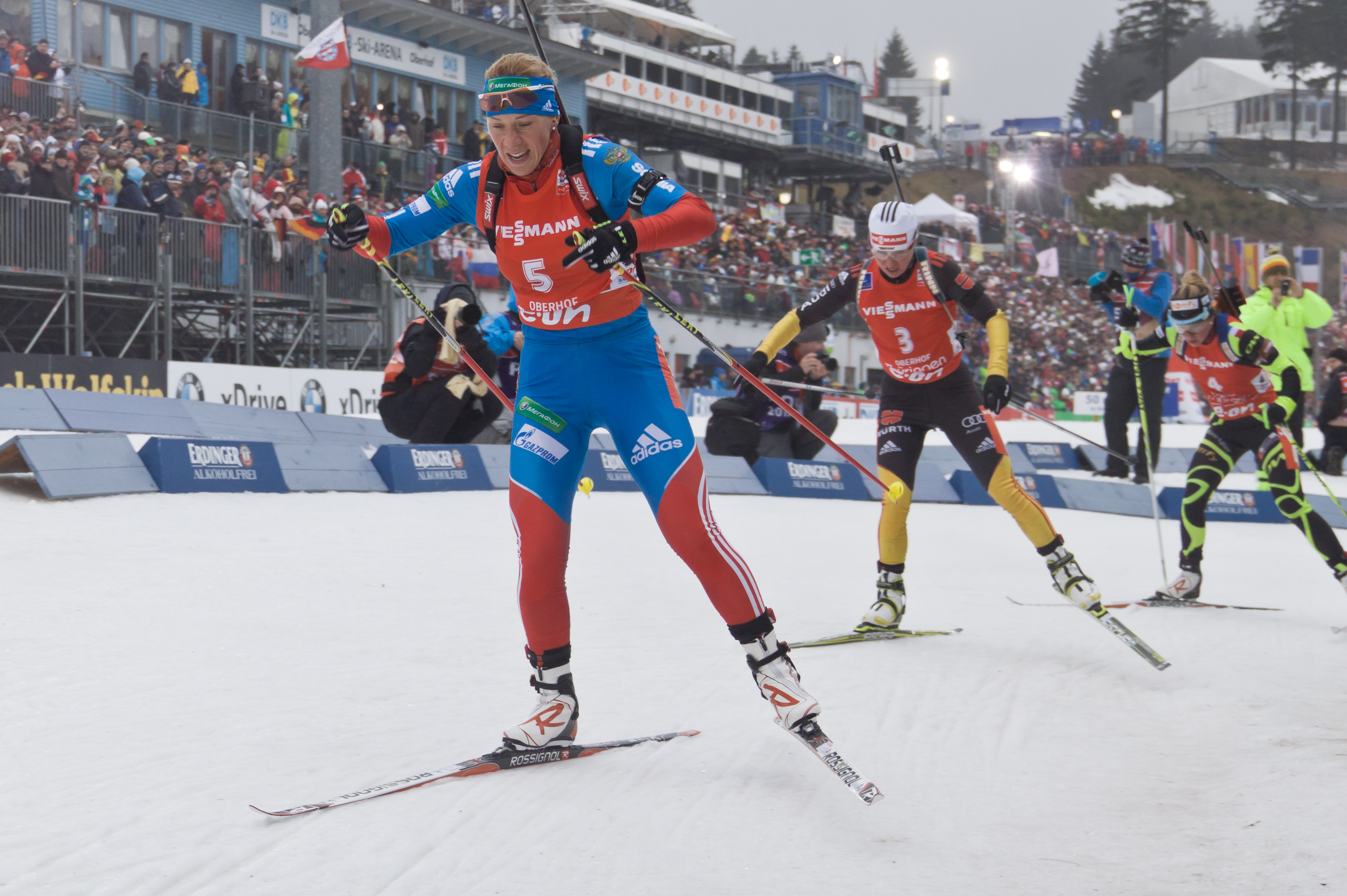
World Cup pursuit race in Oberhof, Germany, 2013

In a pursuit, biathletes' starts are separated by their time differences from a previous race, most commonly a sprint. The contestant crossing the finish line first is the winner. The distance is 12.5 km for men and 10 km for women, skied over five laps; there are four shooting bouts (two prone, two standing, in that order) and each miss means a penalty loop of 150 m. To prevent awkward or dangerous crowding of the skiing loops and overcapacity at the shooting range, World Cup Pursuits are held with only the 60 top-ranking biathletes after the preceding race. The biathletes shoot on a first-come, first-served basis at the lane corresponding to the position they arrived for all shooting bouts. If the pursuit follows an individual biathlon race, the lag behind the winner is halved.

=== Mass start ===
In the mass start, racers start in a series of rows and columns as determined by their previous results. The first racer to cross the finish line is declared winner. In this 15 km for men or 12.5 km for women competition, the distance is skied over a series of five laps; there are four bouts of shooting (two prone, two standing, in that order), with the first shooting bout being at the lane corresponding to the competitor's bib number (bib #10 shoots at lane #10 regardless of position in race), with the rest of the shooting bouts being on a first-come, first-served basis (if a competitor arrives at the lane in fifth place, they shoot at lane 5). As in sprint and pursuit, competitors must ski one 150 m penalty loop for each miss. Here again, to avoid unwanted congestion, World Cup Mass starts are held with only the 30 top ranking athletes on the start line (half that of the Pursuit as here all contestants start simultaneously).

=== Mass start 60 ===
Starting in the 2018/2019 season, the Mass Start 60 became part of the International Biathlon Union (IBU) competition formats. The Mass Start with 60 starters does not replace the current Mass Start with 30 starters.

All participants ski the first lap, but only the first 30 competitors perform a prone shooting bout, the next 30 consecutive contestants (designated by bib number) perform another lap on the course. At the end of the second lap, the second groups performs their first shooting bout, and the first 30 perform another lap on the course. After all biathletes have completed their first prone bout, the race progresses like a typical mass-start, all competitors complete their remaining prone bout, and two stages of standing shooting concurrently. Put more simply:

Bib 1–30 = lap, shoot1, lap, lap, shoot2, lap, shoot3, lap, shoot4, lap

Bib 31–60 = lap, lap, shoot1, lap, shoot2, lap, shoot3, lap, shoot4, lap

=== Relay ===
The relay teams consist of four biathletes, who each ski 7.5 km (men) or 6 km (women), each leg skied over three laps, with two shooting rounds; one prone, one standing. For every round of five targets, there are eight rounds available. However, the last three can only be single-loaded manually, into the chamber of the firearm, one at a time from spare round holders or from rounds deposited by the competitor into trays or onto the mat at the firing line. If there are still remaining targets after 8 fired shots, one 150 m (490 ft) penalty loop must be taken for each missed target remaining. The first-leg participants all start simultaneously, and as in cross-country skiing relays, every athlete of a team must touch the team's next-leg participant to perform a valid changeover. On the first shooting stage of the first leg, the participant must shoot in the lane corresponding to their bib number (bib #10 shoots at lane #10 regardless of their position in the race), then for the remainder of the relay, the relay team shoots on a first-come, first-served basis (arrive at the range in fifth place, shoot at lane 5).

=== Mixed relay ===
The mixed relay is similar to the ordinary relay, but the teams are composed of two women and two men. From its first instance at the world championships in 2005 until the end of the 2017 season, the first two legs were always run by the women, followed by the men on legs 3 and 4. Since the 2018 season however, the race can be started by either the men or women. Additionally, for most of the event's history, the women's legs have been 6 km (3.7 mi) and the men's legs 7.5 km (4.7 mi) as in ordinary relay competitions. However, since the 2019 season the event has all four legs being either 6 km (3.7 mi) or 7.5 km (4.7 mi). This event was added to the Olympics starting in 2014.

=== Single mixed relay ===
In 2015, the single mixed relay was introduced to the Biathlon World Cup by the IBU. The event is run on a 1.5 km (0.93 mi) course with a 75 m (246 ft) penalty loop, and each team consists of a female and a male biathlete. The race is divided into four legs, with the first three being 3 km (1.9 mi) or 2 laps and the final leg being 4.5 km (2.8 mi) or 3 laps, totalling 13.5 km (8.4 mi). After each leg, the biathletes exchange so that each biathlete completes two legs. Specific to this format, the exchange happens immediately after the last shooting of each leg without skiing an additional lap (as is usually the case). The race can be started by either the female or male member of the relay, with the finishing member performing an extra lap. This event was added to the world championships in 2019.

=== Team (obsolete) ===
A team consists of four biathletes, but unlike the relay competition, all team members start at the same time. Two athletes must shoot in the prone shooting round, the other two in the standing round. In case of a miss, the two non-shooting biathletes must ski a penalty loop of 150 m (490 ft). The skiers must enter the shooting area together and must also finish within 15 seconds of each other; otherwise, a time penalty of 1 minute is added to the total time. Since 2004, this race format has been obsolete at the World Cup level.

== Broadcasting ==
Biathlon events are broadcast most regularly where the sport enjoys its greatest popularity, namely Germany (ARD, ZDF), Austria (ORF), Norway (NRK), France (L'Équipe 21), Finland (YLE), Estonia (ETV), Latvia (LTV), Lithuania (LRT), Croatia (HRT), Poland (TVP), Ukraine (UA:PBC), Sweden (SVT), Russia (Match TV, Channel One), Belarus (TVR), Slovakia (RTVS), Slovenia (RTV), Bosnia and Herzegovina (BHRT), Bulgaria (BNT), and South Korea (KBS); it is broadcast on European-wide Eurosport, which also broadcasts to the Asia-Pacific region. World Cup races are streamed via the IBU website.

== Biathlon records and statistics ==
The IBU maintains biathlon records, rules, news, videos, and statistics for many years back, all of which are available at its web site.

== Health risks ==
Biathlon is generally considered to be a sport with a low risk of injuries or accidents, as is also the case with cross-country skiing. While some injuries from firearms accidents were more common in the past, these led to higher safety standards. Biathletes, as endurance athletes, have an elevated risk of eating disorders.

== See also ==
- Biathlon World Cup
- Biathlon World Championships
- List of Olympic medalists in biathlon
- Paralympic biathlon
- Nordic field biathlon and moose biathlon, Nordic biathlon variants using fullbore rifles

Biathlon's two sports disciplines:

- Cross-country skiing (sport)
- Rifle shooting sports

Other multi-discipline sports (otherwise unrelated to biathlon):

- IBU Summer Biathlon
- Duathlon
- Nordic Combined
- Triathlon
- Pentathlon
- Modern pentathlon
- Heptathlon
- Decathlon
- Chess boxing
- Omnium (track cycling)
