= FIS Nordic World Ski Championships 1926 =

International Nordic skiing competition

- Official poster for the FIS Nordic World Ski Championships 1926. (in Finnish)
- Host city: Lahti
- Country: Finland
- Events: 4
- Opening: 4 February 1926
- Closing: 6 February 1926

The FIS Nordic World Ski Championships 1926 took place between February 4–6, 1926 in Lahti, Finland.

== Men's cross country ==
=== 30 km ===
February 4, 1926

Medal	Athlete	Time
Gold	Matti Raivio (FIN)	2:20:55
Silver	Tauno Lappalainen (FIN)	2:27:13
Bronze	Veli Saarinen (FIN)	2:27:34

18 km was replaced by 30 km, but returned the following year. 30 km would not return to the championships again until 1954 when the 18 km event was shortened to 15 km. 15 of the 21 skiers finished the event.

=== 50 km ===
February 6, 1926

Medal	Athlete	Time
Gold	Matti Raivio (FIN)	4:18:18
Silver	Tauno Lappalainen (FIN)	4:26:45
Bronze	Olav Kjelbotn (NOR)	4:26:47

The conditions during these championships were extremely rough, with a temperature of −30 °C (−22 °F). In the 50 km, the top finishers used plastered masks for protection to their face. 14 of the 19 skiers finished the event.

== Men's Nordic combined ==
=== Individual ===
February 4, 1926

Medal	Athlete	Points
Gold	Johan Grøttumsbråten (NOR)	37.125
Silver	Thorleif Haug (NOR)	35.415
Bronze	Einar Landvik (NOR)	33.127

Grøttumsbråten had the fastest time in the cross country portion of the event, finishing three minutes ahead of Haug. Jacob Tullin Thams of Norway had the longest jump of the competition with a distance of 39.5 meters.

== Men's ski jumping ==
=== Individual large hill ===
February 4, 1926

Medal	Athlete	Points
Gold	Jacob Tullin Thams (NOR)	113.880
Silver	Otto Aasen (NOR)	113.135
Bronze	Georg Østerholt (NOR)	108.385

20 of the 28 jumpers completed this event. Thams had the longest jump in the competition with a distance of 38.5 meters. Some sources have the points 18.980, 18.860 and 18.000 for the top 3, according to the format used 1924-1928

== Medal table ==
Rank	Nation	Gold	Silver	Bronze	Total
1	Norway (NOR)	2	2	3	7
2	Finland (FIN)	2	2	1	5
Totals (2 entries)		4	4	4	12
