= Military patrol =

Team winter sport

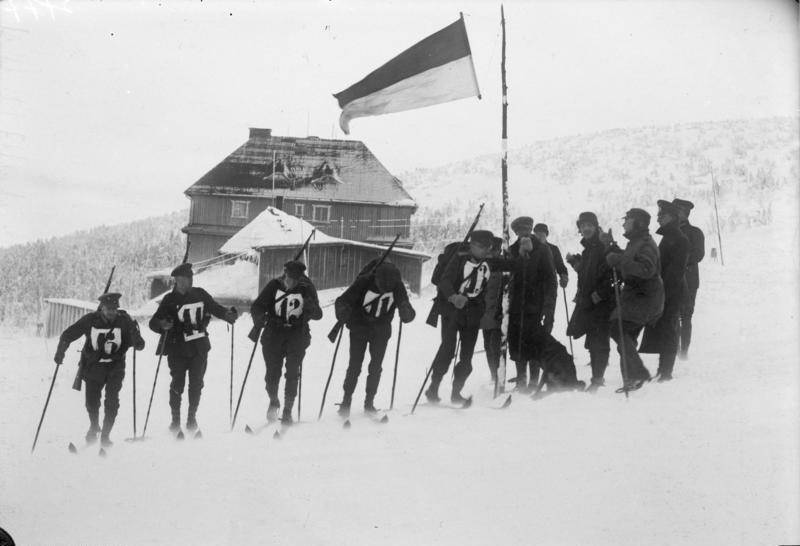
Start of a German Reichswehr military training patrol team in the Giant Mountains, January 1932.

Military patrol is a team winter sport in which athletes compete in cross-country skiing and rifle shooting. Formerly ski mountaineering was also part of the sport. It is usually contested between countries or military units.

The military patrol competition encompasses 20 km cross-country skiing (15 km for women) and rifle shooting. The size of the patrol is four members, one leader and 3 members. The leader does not take part in shooting. The rules are very similar to modern biathlon.

Military patrol forms part of the International Military Sports Council (Conseil International du Sport Militaire, or CISM) skiing championships starting in 1929. It was in the official programme of the Winter Olympic Games in 1924 Chamonix, (Note: The official website of the Olympic Movement now treats Men's Military Patrol at the 1924 games as an event within the sport of Biathlon. However the 1924 Official Report treats it as an event and discipline within what was then called Skiing and is now called Nordic Skiing.) and on three occasions as a demonstration sport (1928, 1936 and 1948). In 1924, the military patrol team member Camille Mandrillon took the Olympic Oath on behalf of the competitors.

== Historical rules ==
Historically the military patrol competition encompassed 25 km cross-country skiing and rifle shooting. The total climb had to be from 500 to 1200 meters (300 to 700 for women). The participating patrol had to consist of one officer, one non-commissioned officer (NCO) and two privates. The officer carried a pistol instead of a rifle and did not take part in the shooting. The total weight of the backpacks of the NCO and the privates had to be at least 24 kilograms.

== Successor sports ==
Biathlon was developed from military patrol.

Another military skiing event is the Patrouille des Glaciers, which also includes competitions and rankings for civilian competitors.

== See also ==
- CISM Military World Games

== General bibliography ==
- Official Report (1924) of both Summer and Winter games: M. Avé, Comité Olympique Français (ed.). Les Jeux de la VIII^{e} Olympiade Paris 1924 – Rapport Officiel (PDF) (in French). Paris: Librairie de France. Archived from the original (PDF) on 5 May 2011.
