= Cross-country skiing at the 1924 Winter Olympics =

Cross-country skiing at the I Olympic Winter Games
- Dates: 30 January – 2 February 1924
- No. of events: 2
- Competitors: 59 from 12 nations

At the 1924 Winter Olympics, two cross-country skiing events were held. The 50 km competition was held on Wednesday, 30 January 1924 and the 18 km competition was held on Saturday, 2 February 1924. The events were also part of the FIS Nordic World Ski Championships as well, which would be combined until the 1980 Winter Olympics.

== Medal summary ==
=== Medal table ===
Rank	Nation	Gold	Silver	Bronze	Total
1	Norway	2	2	1	5
2	Finland	0	0	1	1
Totals (2 entries)		2	2	2	6

=== Events ===
Event	Gold		Silver		Bronze	
18 km	Thorleif Haug; Norway	1:14:31.4	Johan Grøttumsbråten; Norway	1:15:51.0	Tapani Niku; Finland	1:16:26.0
50 km	Thorleif Haug; Norway	3:44:32	Thoralf Strømstad; Norway	3:46:23	Johan Grøttumsbråten; Norway	3:47:46

The results of Haug and Grøttumsbråten in the 18 km event should have been disqualified: as entrants of the Nordic combined event, they hadn't entered their names in this event. Tapani Niku wasn't however willing to be awarded the gold medal, though he later received a gold medal from the French Alp Club.

All three medalists in the 50 km also finished in their same positions in the Nordic combined event.

== Participating nations ==
Cross-country skiers from the United States only competed in the 18 km event. Fifteen cross-country skiers competed in both events.

A total of 59 cross-country skiers from twelve nations competed at the Chamonix Games:

- Czechoslovakia (6)
- Finland (5)
- France (8)
- Hungary (3)
- Italy (7)
- Latvia (1)
- Norway (5)
- Poland (3)
- Sweden (6)
- Switzerland (7)
- United States (4)
- Yugoslavia (4)
