= Speed skating at the 1928 Winter Olympics – Men's 500 metres =

Men's 500 metres speed skating at the II Olympic Winter Games
- Pictogram for speed skating
- Venue: St. Moritz Olympic Ice Rink
- Date: 13 February 1928
- Competitors: 37 from 14 nations
- Winning time: 43.4 OR

Medalists
1st place, gold medalist(s)		Bernt Evensen	Norway
1st place, gold medalist(s)		Clas Thunberg	Finland
3rd place, bronze medalist(s)		John Farrell	United States
3rd place, bronze medalist(s)		Jaakko Friman	Finland
3rd place, bronze medalist(s)		Roald Larsen	Norway

The 500 metres speed skating event was part of the speed skating at the 1928 Winter Olympics programme. The competition was held on Monday, 13 February 1928. Thirty-three speed skaters from 14 nations competed.

== Medalists ==
Gold	Silver	Bronze
Bernt Evensen; Norway Clas Thunberg; Finland		John Farrell; United States Jaakko Friman; Finland Roald Larsen; Norway

== Records ==
These were the standing world and Olympic records (in seconds) prior to the 1928 Winter Olympics.

World record	43.1(*)	(Norway) Roald Larsen	Davos (SUI)	4 February 1928
Olympic record	44.0	(United States) Charles Jewtraw	Chamonix (FRA)	26 January 1924

(*) The record was set in a high altitude venue (more than 1000 metres above sea level) and on naturally frozen ice.

Seven speed skaters were faster than the standing Olympic record with the two Olympic champions as new Olympic record holders. Bernt Evensen and Clas Thunberg each set a time of 43.4 seconds.

== Results ==
Place	Athlete	Time
1	Clas Thunberg (FIN)	43.4 OR
1	Bernt Evensen (NOR)	43.4 OR
3	John Farrell (USA)	43.6
3	Roald Larsen (NOR)	43.6
3	Jaakko Friman (FIN)	43.6
6	Haakon Pedersen (NOR)	43.8
7	Charles Gorman (CAN)	43.9
8	Bertel Backman (FIN)	44.4
9	Oskar Olsen (NOR)	44.7
10	Eddie Murphy (USA)	44.9
11	Toivo Ovaska (FIN)	45.2
11	Willy Logan (CAN)	45.2
11	Irving Jaffee (USA)	45.2
14	Ross Robinson (CAN)	45.9
15	Christfried Burmeister (EST)	46.2
16	Alberts Rumba (LAT)	46.3
17	Valentine Bialas (USA)	46.5
18	Fritz Moser (AUT)	46.7
19	Zoltán Eötvös (HUN)	46.8
20	Fritz Jungblut (GER)	47.2
21	Otto Polacsek (AUT)	47.5
22	Aleksander Mitt (EST)	47.7
23	Gustaf Andersson (SWE)	47.9
24	Erhard Mayke (GER)	49.1
24	Rudolf Riedl (AUT)	49.1
26	Léonhard Quaglia (FRA)	49.5
27	Siem Heiden (NED)	49.9
28	Charles Thaon (FRA)	50.1
28	Kęstutis Bulota (LTU)	50.1
30	Frederick Dix (GBR)	53.4
31	Leonard Stewart (GBR)	54.8
32	Cyril Horn (GBR)	54.9
33	Wim Kos (NED)	56.2
