= Speed skating at the 1928 Winter Olympics – Men's 1500 metres =

Men's 1500 metres speed skating at the II Olympic Winter Games
- Pictogram for speed skating
- Venue: St. Moritz Olympic Ice Rink
- Date: 14 February 1928
- Competitors: 30 from 14 nations
- Winning time: 2:21.1

Medalists
| 1st place, gold medalist(s) | | Clas Thunberg | Finland |
| 2nd place, silver medalist(s) | | Bernt Evensen | Norway |
| 3rd place, bronze medalist(s) | | Ivar Ballangrud | Norway |

The 1500 metres speed skating event was part of the speed skating at the 1928 Winter Olympics programme. The competition was held on Tuesday, 14 February 1928. Thirty speed skaters from 14 nations competed.

== Medalists ==
| Gold | Silver | Bronze |
|---|---|---|
| Clas Thunberg; Finland | Bernt Evensen; Norway | Ivar Ballangrud; Norway |

== Records ==
These were the standing world and Olympic records (in minutes) prior to the 1928 Winter Olympics.

| World record | 2:17.4(*) | (Norway) Oscar Mathisen | Davos (SUI) | 18 January 1914 |
| Olympic record | 2:20.8 | (Finland) Clas Thunberg | Chamonix (FRA) | 27 January 1924 |

(*) The record was set in a high altitude venue (more than 1000 metres above sea level) and on naturally frozen ice.

== Results ==
| Place | Athlete | Time |
|---|---|---|
| 1 | Clas Thunberg (FIN) | 2:21.1 |
| 2 | Bernt Evensen (NOR) | 2:21.9 |
| 3 | Ivar Ballangrud (NOR) | 2:22.6 |
| 4 | Roald Larsen (NOR) | 2:25.3 |
| 5 | Eddie Murphy (USA) | 2:25.9 |
| 6 | Valentine Bialas (USA) | 2:26.3 |
| 7 | Irving Jaffee (USA) | 2:26.7 |
| 8 | John Farrell (USA) | 2:26.8 |
| 9 | Gustaf Andersson (SWE) | 2:27.5 |
| 10 | Zoltán Eötvös (HUN) | 2:27.9 |
| 11 | Fritz Jungblut (GER) | 2:28.2 |
| 12 | Charles Gorman (CAN) | 2:28.4 |
| 13 | Wollert Nygren (NOR) | 2:28.7 |
| 14 | Alberts Rumba (LAT) | 2:28.9 |
| 15 | Toivo Ovaska (FIN) | 2:29.3 |
| 16 | Fritz Moser (AUT) | 2:31.1 |
| 17 | Ross Robinson (CAN) | 2:32.3 |
| 18 | Siem Heiden (NED) | 2:33.1 |
| 19 | Christfried Burmeister (EST) | 2:33.3 |
| 20 | Aleksander Mitt (EST) | 2:35.0 |
| 21 | Willy Logan (CAN) | 2:35.6 |
| 22 | Rudolf Riedl (AUT) | 2:37.8 |
| 23 | Arthur Vollstedt (GER) | 2:39.9 |
| 24 | Cyril Horn (GBR) | 2:40.0 |
| 25 | Kęstutis Bulota (LTU) | 2:40.9 |
| 26 | Charles Thaon (FRA) | 2:41.2 |
| 27 | Leonard Stewart (GBR) | 2:48.9 |
| 28 | Frederick Dix (GBR) | 2:49.6 |
| 29 | Bertel Backman (FIN) | DNF |
| 29 | Wim Kos (NED) | DNF |
