= Speed skating at the 1928 Winter Olympics – Men's 5000 metres =

Men's 5000 metres speed skating at the II Olympic Winter Games
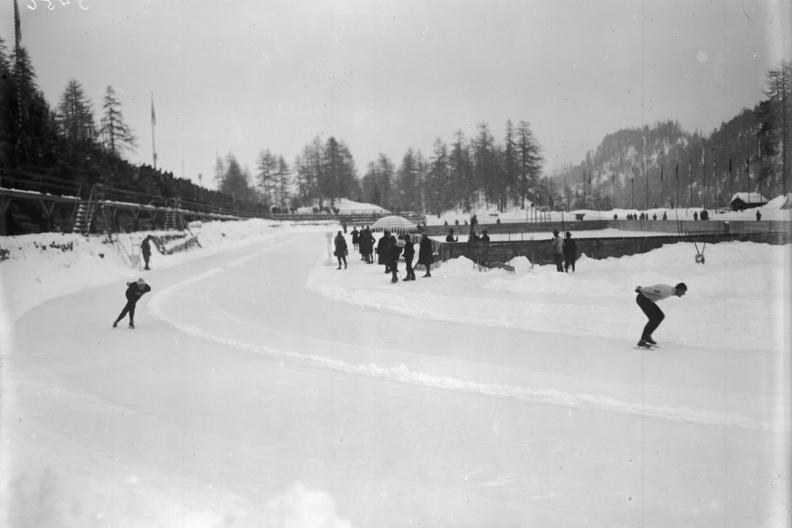
- The race between Carlson (left) and Mayke (right).
- Venue: St. Moritz Olympic Ice Rink
- Date: 13 February 1928
- Competitors: 33 from 14 nations
- Winning time: 8:50.5

Medalists
| 1st place, gold medalist(s) | | Ivar Ballangrud | Norway |
| 2nd place, silver medalist(s) | | Julius Skutnabb | Finland |
| 3rd place, bronze medalist(s) | | Bernt Evensen | Norway |

The 5000 metres speed skating event was part of the speed skating at the 1928 Winter Olympics programme. The competition was held on Monday, 13 February 1928. Thirty-three speed skaters from 14 nations competed.

== Medalists ==
| Gold | Silver | Bronze |
|---|---|---|
| Ivar Ballangrud; Norway | Julius Skutnabb; Finland | Bernt Evensen; Norway |

== Records ==
These were the standing world and Olympic records (in minutes) prior to the 1928 Winter Olympics.

| World record | 8:26.5(*) | (Norway) Harald Strøm | Kristiania (NOR) | 18 February 1922 |
| Olympic record | 8:39.0 | (Finland) Clas Thunberg | Chamonix (FRA) | 26 January 1924 |

(*) The record was set on naturally frozen ice.

== Results ==
| Place | Athlete | Time |
|---|---|---|
| 1 | Ivar Ballangrud (NOR) | 8:50.5 |
| 2 | Julius Skutnabb (FIN) | 8:59.1 |
| 3 | Bernt Evensen (NOR) | 9:01.1 |
| 4 | Irving Jaffee (USA) | 9:01.3 |
| 5 | Armand Carlsen (NOR) | 9:01.5 |
| 6 | Valentine Bialas (USA) | 9:06.3 |
| 7 | Michael Staksrud (NOR) | 9:07.3 |
| 8 | Otto Polacsek (AUT) | 9:08.9 |
| 9 | Gustaf Andersson (SWE) | 9:09.7 |
| 10 | Ossi Blomqvist (FIN) | 9:09.9 |
| 11 | Siem Heiden (NED) | 9:10.0 |
| 12 | Clas Thunberg (FIN) | 9:11.8 |
| 13 | Bertel Backman (FIN) | 9:14.0 |
| 14 | Eddie Murphy (USA) | 9:19.5 |
| 15 | Alberts Rumba (LAT) | 9:19.7 |
| 16 | Fritz Jungblut (GER) | 9:26.7 |
| 17 | John Farrell (USA) | 9:29.2 |
| 18 | Léonhard Quaglia (FRA) | 9:33.3 |
| 19 | Wim Kos (NED) | 9:34.2 |
| 20 | Zoltán Eötvös (HUN) | 9:34.4 |
| 21 | Alexander Mitt (EST) | 9:35.2 |
| 22 | Ross Robinson (CAN) | 9:38.9 |
| 23 | Cyril Horn (GBR) | 9:45.0 |
| 24 | Christfried Burmeister (EST) | 9:46.2 |
| 25 | Kęstutis Bulota (LTU) | 9:49.8 |
| 26 | Rudolf Riedl (AUT) | 9:53.5 |
| 27 | Fritz Moser (AUT) | 9:57.8 |
| 28 | Arthur Vollstedt (GER) | 9:58.5 |
| 29 | Willy Logan (CAN) | 10:10.3 |
| 30 | Charles Thaon (FRA) | 10:18.8 |
| 31 | Leonard Stewart (GBR) | 10:40.0 |
| 32 | Frederick Dix (GBR) | 10:55.6 |
| – | Erhard Mayke (GER) | DNF |
