= Germany at the 1928 Winter Olympics =

- IOC code: GER
- NOC: German Olympic Committee

in St. Moritz
- Competitors: 44 (39 men, 5 women) in 7 sports
- Flag bearer: Karl Neuner (Nordic combined)
- Medals Ranked 8th: Gold 0 Silver 0 Bronze 1 Total 1

Winter Olympics appearances (overview)
- 1928; 1932; 1936; 1948; 1952; 1956–1988; 1992; 1994; 1998; 2002; 2006; 2010; 2014; 2018; 2022; 2026

Other related appearances
- United Team of Germany (1956–1964); East Germany (1968–1988); West Germany (1968–1988)

Germany competed at the 1928 Winter Olympics in St. Moritz, Switzerland. Germany had not been invited to the inaugural 1924 Games due to its role in World War I.

== Medalists ==
Medal	Name	Sport	Event
Bronze	Hanns Kilian; Valentin Krempl; Hans Hess; Sebastian Huber; Hanns Nägle	Bobsleigh	Five-man

== Bobsleigh ==
Sled	Athletes	Event	Run 1		Run 2		Total	
Sled	Athletes	Event	Time	Rank	Time	Rank	Time	Rank
GER-1	Hans-Edgar Endres; Paul Martin; Karl Reinhardt; Paul Volkhardt; Rudolf Soenning	Five-man	1:48.0	22	1:43.9	9	3:31.9	18
GER-2	Hanns Kilian; Hans Heß; Sebastian Huber; Valentin Krempl; Hanns Nägle	Five-man	1:41.7	5	1:40.2	2	3:21.9	3rd place, bronze medalist(s)

== Cross-country skiing ==
Men

Event	Athlete	Race	
Event	Athlete	Time	Rank
18 km	Wilhelm Braun	2'03:52	29
18 km	Hans Bauer	1'57:03	20
18 km	Otto Wahl	1'55:00	19
18 km	Ludwig Böck	1'48:56	14
50 km	Fritz Pellkofer	5'41:00	16
50 km	Hans Bauer	5'36:21	12
50 km	Otto Wahl	5'34:02	10

== Figure skating ==
Men

Athlete	Event	CF	FS	Places	Points	Final rank
Werner Rittberger	Men's singles	DNF	12	–	–	–
Paul Franke	Men's singles	14	10	76	1326.00	12

Women

Athlete	Event	CF	FS	Places	Points	Final rank
Elly Winter	Women's singles	18	11	110	1765.75	18
Else Flebbe	Women's singles	16	12	103	1833.50	15
Margrit Bernhardt	Women's singles	14	14	91	1890.00	12
Ellen Brockhöft	Women's singles	8	10	67	2003.00	9

Pairs

Athletes	Points	Score	Final rank
Ilse Kishauer; Ernst Gaste	63	75.75	8

== Ice hockey ==
=== Group C ===
The top team (highlighted) advanced to the medal round.

Team	GP	W	L	T	GF	GA
Switzerland	2	1	0	1	5	4
Austria	2	0	0	2	4	4
Germany	2	0	1	1	0	1

February 11	Austria	0:0 -	Germany
February 16	Switzerland	1:0 (1:0,0:0,0:0)	Germany

—	Germany
	Gustav Jaenecke (Berliner SC); Wolfgang Kittel (Berliner SC); Franz Kreisel (SC Riessersee); Matthias Leis (SC Riessersee); Fritz Rammelmayr (SC Riessersee); Erich Römer (Berliner SC); Walter Sachs (Berliner SC); Hans Schmid (SC Riessersee); Martin Schröttle (SC Riessersee); Marquardt Slevogt (SC Riessersee); Alfred Steinke (Berliner SC) Rolf Reschke

== Nordic combined ==
Events:

- 18 km cross-country skiing
- normal hill ski jumping

The cross-country skiing part of this event was combined with the main medal event of cross-country skiing. Those results can be found above in this article in the cross-country skiing section. Some athletes (but not all) entered in both the cross-country skiing and Nordic combined event, their time on the 18 km was used for both events. One would expect that athletes competing at the Nordic combined event, would participate in the cross-country skiing event as well, as they would have the opportunity to win more than one medal. This was not always the case due to the maximum number of athletes that could represent a country per event.

The ski jumping (normal hill) event was held separate from the main medal event of ski jumping, results can be found in the table below.

Athlete	Event	Cross-country			Ski Jumping				Total	
Athlete	Event	Time	Points	Rank	Distance 1	Distance 2	Total points	Rank	Points	Rank
Karl Neuner	Individual	DNF	–	–	–	–	–	–	DNF	–
Max Kröckel	Individual	2'00:59	8.125	17	53.5	51.5	15.812	6	11.968	14
Walter Glaß	Individual	2'00:57	8.750	15	45.0	55.0	15.104	11	11.927	15
Gustl Müller	Individual	1'52:43	12.250	12	41.5	60.5 (fall)	7.978	28	10.114	21
Ludwig Böck	Individual	1'48:56	14.125	5	36.0	48.0	12.395	21	13.260	7

== Ski jumping ==
Athlete	Event	Jump 1 (Dist.)	Jump 2 (Dist.)	Total	
Athlete	Event	Jump 1 (Dist.)	Jump 2 (Dist.)	Points	Rank
Franz Thannheimer	Normal hill	46.5	55.5	15.333	17
Erich Recknagel	Normal hill	48.5	62.0	16.020	11
Alois Kratzer	Normal hill	49.5	54.0	14.853	19
Martin Neuner	Normal hill	50.0	57.0	16.291	9

== Speed skating ==
Men

Event	Athlete	Race	
Event	Athlete	Time	Rank
500 m	Erhard Mayke	49.1	24
500 m	Fritz Jungblut	47.2	20
1500 m	Arthur Vollstedt	2:39.9	23
1500 m	Fritz Jungblut	2:28.2	11
5000 m	Erhard Mayke	DNF	–
5000 m	Arthur Vollstedt	9:58.5	28
5000 m	Fritz Jungblut	9:26.7	16
