= 1923 World Allround Speed Skating Championships =

International speed skating competition

World Allround Speed Skating Championships
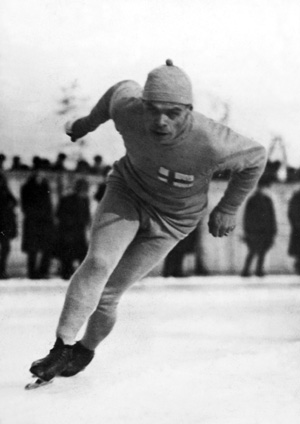
- Clas Thunberg (1924)
- Venue: Östermalms Idrottsplats, Stockholm, Sweden
- Dates: 10–11 February
- Competitors: 18 from 5 nations

Medalist men
1st place, gold medalist(s)		Clas Thunberg	FIN
2nd place, silver medalist(s)		Harald Strøm	NOR
3rd place, bronze medalist(s)		Yakov Melnikov	URS

The 1923 World Allround Speed Skating Championships took place at 10 and 11 February 1923 at the ice rink Östermalms Idrottsplats in Stockholm, Sweden.

Harald Strøm was defending champion but did not succeed in prolonging his title.
Clas Thunberg became World champion for the first time.

== Allround results ==
Place	Athlete	Country	Points	500m	5000m	1500m	10000m
1st place, gold medalist(s)	Clas Thunberg	Finland	11.0	45.2 (1)	9:10.3 (2)	2:26.3 (2)	18:21.3 (6)
2nd place, silver medalist(s)	Harald Strøm	Norway	13.0	47.4 (6)	9:13.6 (3)	2:27.2 (3)	17:58.4 (1)
3rd place, bronze medalist(s)	Yakov Melnikov	Soviet Union	14.0	47.0 (4)	9:06.2 (1)	2:30.4 (6)	18:09.0 (3)
4	Roald Larsen	Norway	17.0	47.6 (7)	9:17.8 (5)	2:24.9 (1)	18:14.4 (4)
5	Ole Olsen	Norway	24.0	49.3 (13)	9:16.5 (4)	2:29.5 (5)	17:59.9 (2)
6	Julius Skutnabb	Finland	25.0	48.0 (8)	9:20.4 (6)	2:28.0 (4)	18:23.2 (7)
7	Oskar Olsen	Norway	36.0	45.9 (2)	9:23.3 (8)	2:34.1 (15)	18:48.4 (11)
8	Eric Blomgren	Sweden	36.0	48.4 (9)	9:29.1 (10)	2:31.6 (9)	18:28.3 (8)
9	Fridtjof Paulsen	Norway	37.0	49.6 (14)	9:22.4 (7)	2:30.8 (7)	18:29.2 (9)
10	Platon Ippolitov	Soviet Union	41.0	49.8 (15)	9:32.8 (11)	2:32.5 (10)	18:19.3 (5)
11	Asser Wallenius	Finland	42.0	46.9 (3)	9:53.0 (16)	2:32.6 (11)	18:56.5 (12)
12	Harald Halvorsen	Norway	42.0	47.2 (5)	9:49.7 (14)	2:31.3 (8)	19:17.8 (15)
13	Toivo Ovaska	Finland	52.0	48.7 (10)	9:49.3 (13)	2:33.5 (12)	19:29.2 (17)
14	Waldemar Bergström	Finland	52.5	51.1 (16)	9:26.5 (9)	2:39.3 (17)	18:35.3 (10)
15	Knut Sundheim	Norway	55.0	49.2 (12)	9:50.8 (15)	2:33.8 (14)	19:07.0 (14)
16	Werner Eriksson	Sweden	58.0	48.9 (11)	10:15.3 (18)	2:33.6 (13)	19:22.9 (16)
17	Gustaf Andersson	Sweden	59.0	51.2 (18)	9:32.9 (12)	2:38.6 (16)	19:06.6 (13)
18	Karl Johansson	Sweden	69.5	51.1 (16)	10:02.6 (17)	2:39.6 (18)	19:32.9 (18)

* = Fell
NC = Not classified
NF = Not finished
NS = Not started
DQ = Disqualified

Source: SpeedSkatingStats.com

== Rules ==
Four distances have to be skated:

- 500m
- 1500m
- 5000m
- 10000m

The ranking was made by award ranking points. The points were awarded to the skaters who had skated all the distances. The final ranking was then decided by ordering the skaters by lowest point totals.

- 1 point for 1st place
- 2 point for 2nd place
- 3 point for 3rd place
- and so on

One could win the World Championships also by winning at least three of the four distances, so the ranking could be affected by this.

Silver and bronze medals were awarded.
