= Speed skating at the 1928 Winter Olympics – Men's 10,000 metres =

Men's 10,000 metres speed skating at the II Olympic Winter Games
- Pictogram for speed skating
- Venue: St. Moritz Olympic Ice Rink
- Date: 14 February 1928
- Competitors: 10 from 6 nations

The 10,000 metres speed skating event was part of the speed skating at the 1928 Winter Olympics programme. The competition was held on Tuesday, February 14, 1928.

In this race, Irving Jaffee was leading the competition, having outskated Norwegian defending world champion Bernt Evensen in their heat, when rising temperatures thawed the ice. In a controversial ruling, the Norwegian referee canceled the entire competition. Although the International Olympic Committee reversed the referee's decision and awarded Jaffee the gold medal, the International Skating Union later overruled the IOC and restored the ruling. Jaffee should have received the gold medal, according to Evensen, but it never occurred.

== Medalists ==
No medals were awarded as the competition was abandoned.

== Records ==
These were the standing world and Olympic records (in minutes) prior to the 1928 Winter Olympics.

World record	17:17.4(*)	(Norway) Armand Carlsen	Davos (SUI)	February 5, 1928
Olympic record	18:04.8	(Finland) Julius Skutnabb	Chamonix (FRA)	January 27, 1924

(*) The record was set in a high altitude venue (more than 1000 metres above sea level) and on naturally frozen ice.

== Results ==
=== Heats ===
Heat 1

Place	Name	Time
1	Irving Jaffee (USA)	18:36.5
2	Bernt Evensen (NOR)	18:36.6

Heat 2

Place	Name	Time
1	Rudolf Riedl (AUT)	20:21.5
2	Kęstutis Bulota (LTU)	20:22.2

Heat 3

Place	Name	Time
1	Otto Polacsek (AUT)	20:00.9
–	Roald Larsen (NOR)	DNF

Heat 4

Place	Name	Time
1	Armand Carlsen (NOR)	20:56.1
2	Valentine Bialas (USA)	21:05.4

Heat 5

This heat was abandoned after 2000 metres due to thawing ice.

Place	Name	Time
–	Gustaf Andersson (SWE)	-
–	Ossi Blomqvist (FIN)	-

== Standings after four heats ==
Place	Speed skater	Time
1	Irving Jaffee (USA)	18:36.5
2	Bernt Evensen (NOR)	18:36.6
3	Otto Polacsek (AUT)	20:00.9
4	Rudolf Riedl (AUT)	20:21.5
5	Kęstutis Bulota (LTU)	20:22.2
6	Armand Carlsen (NOR)	20:56.1
7	Valentine Bialas (USA)	21:05.4
–	Roald Larsen (NOR)	DNF
