= 1925 World Allround Speed Skating Championships =

International speed skating competition

World Allround Speed Skating Championships
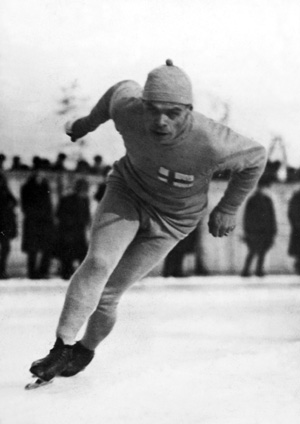
- Clas Thunberg (1924)
- Venue: Bislett Stadion, Oslo, Norway
- Dates: 21–22 February
- Competitors: 24 from 5 nations

Medalist men
1st place, gold medalist(s)		Clas Thunberg	FIN
2nd place, silver medalist(s)		Uuno Pietilä	FIN
3rd place, bronze medalist(s)		Roald Larsen	NOR

The 1925 World Allround Speed Skating Championships took place on the 21st and 22 February 1925 at the ice rink Bislett Stadion in Oslo, Norway.

Roald Larsen was defending champion but did not succeed in prolonging his title.
Clas Thunberg became World champion for the second time.

== Allround results ==
Place	Athlete	Country	Points	500m	5000m	1500m	10000m
1st place, gold medalist(s)	Clas Thunberg	Finland	5.0	44.7 (1)	8:43.3 (1)	2:23.0 (1)	18:03.0 (2)
2nd place, silver medalist(s)	Uuno Pietilä	Finland	17.0	46.9 (7)	8:46.7 (2)	2:29.4 (7)	18:01.5 (1)
3rd place, bronze medalist(s)	Roald Larsen	Norway	18.0	46.0 (4)	8:47.2 (4)	2:29.1 (5)	18:30.8 (6)
4	Sigurd Moen	Norway	22.5	47.2 (11)	8:47.1 (3)	2:28.4 (4)	18:21.3 (5)
5	Ragnvald Olsen	Norway	29.0	46.8 (6)	9:01.5 (8)	2:29.2 (6)	18:47.1 (10)
6	Harald Strøm	Norway	37.0	46.9 (7)	9:05.7 (11)	2:26.0 (2)	18:38.2 (8)
7	Asser Wallenius	Finland	38.0	45.1 (2)	9:28.7 (22)	2:26.0 (2)	18:53.0 (12)
8	Otto Polacsek	Austria	40.5	48.3 (17)	8:50.5 (5)	2:33.6 (15)	18:13.1 (3)
9	Armand Carlsen	Norway	42.0	48.9 (21)	8:53.0 (6)	2:32.2 (12)	18:17.0 (4)
10	Osman Dieseth	Norway	44.0	47.2 (11)	9:06.0 (12)	2:31.6 (11)	18:45.6 (9)
11	Harald Halvorsen	Norway	44.0	46.1 (5)	9:13.8 (15)	2:30.0 (9)	19:13.2 (16)
12	Asbjørn Steffensen	Norway	48.0	48.0 (15)	9:06.0 (12)	2:30.2 (10)	18:50.4 (11)
13	Yrjö Päivinen	Finland	50.0	49.1 (23)	8:57.3 (7)	2:32.9 (14)	18:31.1 (7)
14	Bernt Evensen	Norway	52.0	46.9 (7)	9:17.1 (17)	2:29.9 (8)	19:33.1 (20)
15	Fredrik Mikkelsen	Norway	56.5	48.3 (17)	9:05.5 (10)	2:35.4 (16)	18:56.9 (13)
16	Toivo Ovaska	Finland	57.0	45.8 (3)	9:11.6 (14)	2:42.0 (24)	19:26.7 (18)
17	Fridtjof Paulsen	Norway	59.0	48.8 (20)	9:03.6 (9)	2:35.8 (17)	18:57.1 (14)
18	Carsten Christensen	Norway	62.0	47.0 (10)	9:25.0 (18)	2:32.4 (13)	19:38.7 (21)
19	Viljo Kanerva	Finland	66.5	48.0 (15)	9:17.0 (16)	2:37.5 (20)	18:59.4 (15)
20	Jakob Hansen	Norway	69.0	47.5 (14)	9:25.2 (19)	2:36.4 (19)	19:26.2 (17)
21	Rolv Erling Gihle	Norway	70.0	47.4 (13)	9:26.2 (20)	2:36.3 (18)	19:31.2 (19)
22	Erik Wingnér	Sweden	85.0	49.0 (22)	9:27.6 (21)	2:37.6 (21)	19:41.0 (22)
NC	Ernst Paul Granstrøm	Norway	-	48.7 (19)	9:52.6 (24)	2:38.6 (22)	-
NC	Arthur Vollstedt	Germany	-	56.2 (24)	9:46.5 (23)	2:41.0 (23)	-

* = Fell
NC = Not classified
NF = Not finished
NS = Not started
DQ = Disqualified

Source: SpeedSkatingStats.com

== Rules ==
Four distances have to be skated:

- 500m
- 1500m
- 5000m
- 10000m

The ranking was made by award ranking points. The points were awarded to the skaters who had skated all the distances. The final ranking was then decided by ordering the skaters by lowest point totals.

- 1 point for 1st place
- 2 point for 2nd place
- 3 point for 3rd place
- and so on

One could win the World Championships also by winning at least three of the four distances, so the ranking could be affected by this.

Silver and bronze medals were awarded.
