= Hans Schmid =

Hans Schmid may refer to:

- Hans Schmid (ice hockey) (1898–?), German ice hockey player
- Hans Schmid (ski jumper) (born 1948), Swiss Olympic ski jumper
- Hans-Christian Schmid (born 1965), German film director
- Hans-Jörg Schmid, German linguist
- Hans Heinrich Schmid (1937–2014), Swiss Protestant Reformed theologian
- Hans Peter Schmid, climatologist
