= 1922 World Allround Speed Skating Championships =

International speed skating competition

World Allround Speed Skating Championships
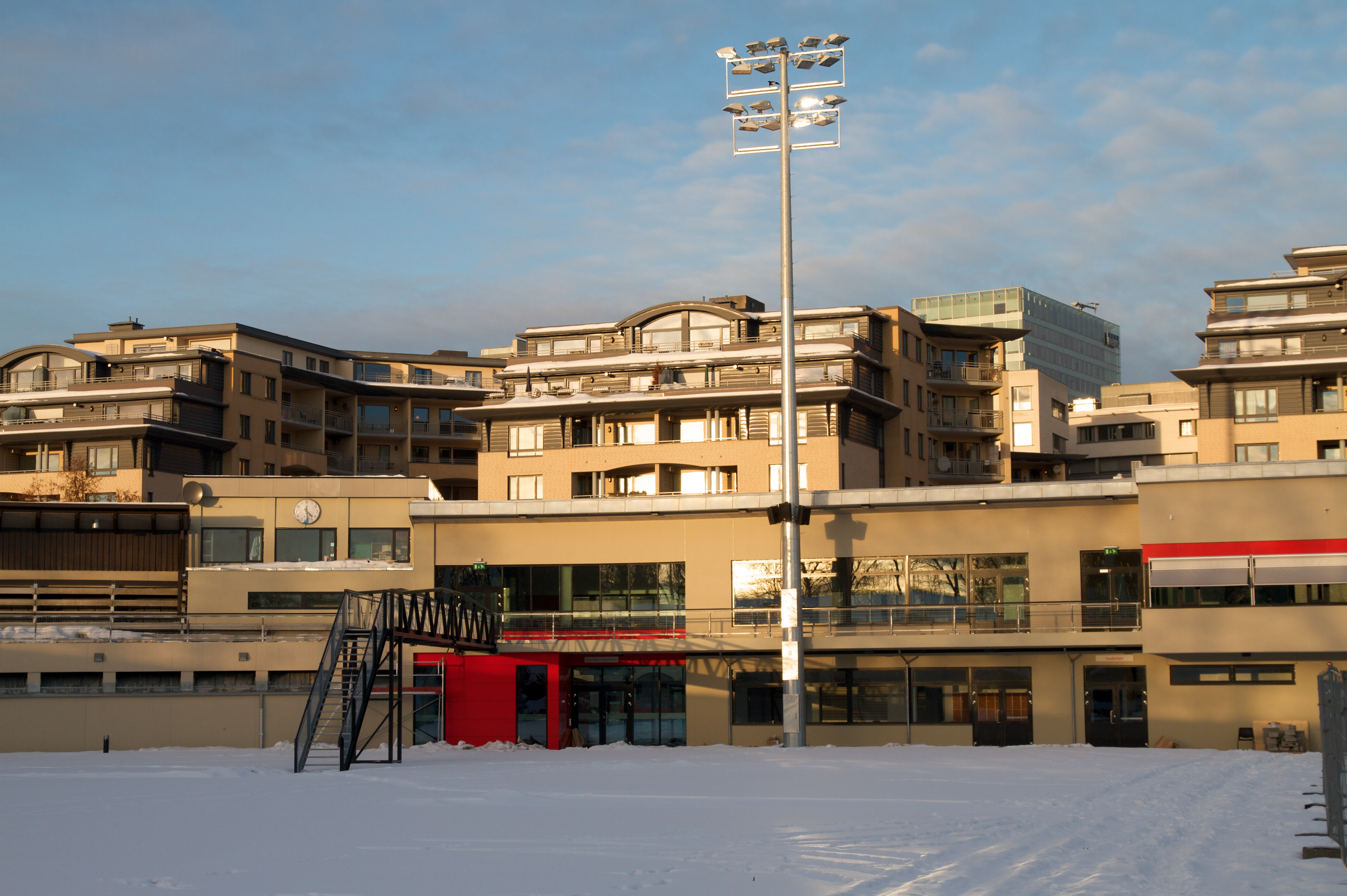
- Frogner stadion (2010)
- Venue: Frogner Stadion, Kristiania, Norway
- Dates: 18–19 February
- Competitors: 18 from 3 nations

Medalist men
1st place, gold medalist(s)		Harald Strøm	NOR
2nd place, silver medalist(s)		Roald Larsen	NOR
3rd place, bronze medalist(s)		Clas Thunberg	FIN

The 1922 World Allround Speed Skating Championships took place at 18 and 19 February 1922 at the ice rink Frogner Stadion in Kristiania, Norway. This was the first championship after the first world war. The previous championship was 8 years ago this is why there were so many skaters who took part for the first time.

Oscar Mathisen was defending champion but did not defend his title.
Harald Strøm became World champion for the first time.

== Allround results ==
Place	Athlete	Country	Points	500m	5000m	1500m	10000m
1st place, gold medalist(s)	Harald Strøm	Norway	9	45.2 (4)	8:26.5 (1)	2:25.3 (3)	17:37.5 (1)
2nd place, silver medalist(s)	Roald Larsen	Norway	13	43.6 (1)	8:43.8 (4)	2:24.8 (2)	18:04.1 (6)
3rd place, bronze medalist(s)	Clas Thunberg	Finland	15	44.1 (2)	8:41.8 (3)	2:22.8 (1)	18:10.2 (9)
4	Ole Olsen	Norway	21.5	46.2 (11)	8:38.1 (2)	2:27.2 (6)	17:43.6 (2)
5	Julius Skutnabb	Finland	24.5	45.9 (8)	8:49.4 (7)	2:27.1 (5)	17:59.3 (4)
6	Sigurd Moen	Norway	28	46.4 (12)	8:46.3 (5)	2:26.1 (4)	18:05.6 (7)
7	Walter Tverin	Finland	32	45.4 (5)	8:52.4 (10)	2:27.2 (6)	18:21.7 (10)
8	Eric Blomgren	Sweden	32.5	45.9 (8)	8:49.6 (8)	2:27.9 (8)	18:09.0 (8)
9	Karl Bergström	Finland	36.5	47.1 (14)	8:49.7 (9)	2:29.2 (10)	17:54.1 (3)
10	Oskar Olsen	Norway	37.5	45.1 (3)	9:00.6 (11)	2:29.2 (10)	18:45.6 (13)
11	Erling Olsen	Norway	41	48.1 (16)	8:48.1 (6)	2:31.7 (15)	18:01.3 (5)
12	Theodor Pedersen	Norway	46.5	45.4 (5)	9:03.3 (12)	2:29.7 (14)	18:55.8 (15)
13	Aksel Belewicz	Finland	48	45.6 (7)	9:18.1 (17)	2:28.5 (9)	19:09.0 (16)
14	Ilmari Danska	Finland	50	46.8 (13)	9:04.2 (13)	2:29.3 (12)	18:44.6 (12)
15	Knut Sundheim	Norway	51	46.1 (10)	9:06.8 (14)	2:29.5 (13)	18:49.7 (14)
16	Gustaf Andersson	Sweden	58	49.1 (17)	9:08.1 (15)	2:33.7 (16)	18:42.5 (11)
NC	Mikal Mikkelsen	Norway	-	50.2 (18)	9:12.8 (16)	NF	NS
NC	Sverre Aune	Norway	-	47.5 (15)	9:23.2 (18)	2:35.4 (17)	NS

* = Fell
NC = Not classified
NF = Not finished
NS = Not started
DQ = Disqualified

Source: SpeedSkatingStats.com

== Rules ==
Four distances have to be skated:

- 500m
- 1500m
- 5000m
- 10000m

The ranking was made by award ranking points. The points were awarded to the skaters who had skated all the distances. The final ranking was then decided by ordering the skaters by lowest point totals.

- 1 point for 1st place
- 2 point for 2nd place
- 3 point for 3rd place
- and so on

One could win the World Championships also by winning at least three of the four distances, so the ranking could be affected by this.

Silver and bronze medals were awarded.
