= Willy Bogner =

Willy Bogner may refer to:

- Willy Bogner Sr. (1909–1977), German Nordic skier, participated in cross country skiing and Nordic combined
- Willy Bogner Jr. (born 1942), his son, German fashion designer and alpine skier
