= 1924 World Allround Speed Skating Championships =

International speed skating competition

World Allround Speed Skating Championships
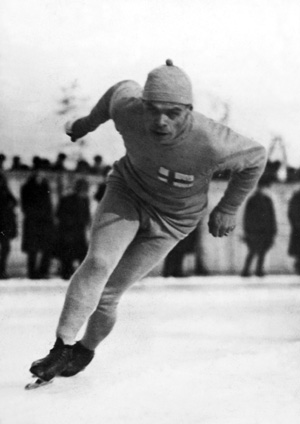
- Clas Thunberg (1924)
- Venue: Pohjoissatama, Helsinki, Finland
- Dates: 1–2 March
- Competitors: 16 from 4 nations

Medalist men
1st place, gold medalist(s)		Roald Larsen	NOR
2nd place, silver medalist(s)		Uuno Pietilä	FIN
3rd place, bronze medalist(s)		Julius Skutnabb	FIN

The 1924 World Allround Speed Skating Championships took place at 1 and 2 March 1924 at the ice rink Pohjoissatama in Helsinki, Finland.

Clas Thunberg was defending champion but did not succeed in prolonging his title.
Roald Larsen became World champion for the first time.

== Allround results ==
Place	Athlete	Country	Points	500m	5000m	1500m	10000m
1st place, gold medalist(s)	Roald Larsen	Norway	7.0	46.0 (3)	8:54.5 (1)	2:27.8 (1)	18:18.0 (1)
2nd place, silver medalist(s)	Uuno Pietilä	Finland	13.5	47.3 (8)	8:57.8 (2)	2:29.9 (4)	18:05.9 (4)
3rd place, bronze medalist(s)	Julius Skutnabb	Finland	17.0	47.0 (6)	9:01.8 (4)	2:29.9 (5)	18:20.2 (5)
4	Asser Wallenius	Finland	19.0	45.4 (2)	9:05.2 (7)	2:29.5 (3)	18:58.5 (3)
5	Ivar Ballangrud	Norway	21.0	49.8 (12)	9:00.5 (3)	2:31.0 (6)	18:17.0 (6)
6	Toivo Ovaska	Finland	24.5	47.0 (7)	9:12.4 (9)	2:29.4 (2)	19:06.2 (2)
7	Yrjö Päivinen	Finland	30.0	50.0 (13)	9:03.6 (6)	2:33.9 (9)	18:36.2 (9)
8	Viljo Kanerva	Finland	33.0	48.8 (11)	9:08.2 (8)	2:34.4 (10)	18:50.3 (10)
9	Lauri Helanterä	Finland	37.0	46.5 (4)	9:39.9 (14)	2:33.1 (8)	20:14.2 (8)
10	Ilmari Danska	Finland	38.0	47.8 (9)	9:32.6 (13)	2:32.6 (7)	19:49.3 (7)
11	Walter Tverin	Finland	40.0	47.9 (10)	9:19.1 (10)	2:35.5 (13)	19:20.8 (12)
12	Waldemar Bergström	Finland	42.0	51.8 (14)	9:20.2 (12)	2:40.8 (14)	18:47.0 (13)
13	Christfried Burmeister	United Kingdom	42.0	55.7 (15)	9:19.2 (11)	2:34.6 (12)	18:56.8 (11)
NC	Clas Thunberg	Finland	-	45.0 (1)	9:03.2 (5)	-	-
NC	Hans Kleeberg jr.	Germany	-	58.0 (16)	DNF	-	-
NC	Harald Belewicz	Finland	-	46.8 (5)	9:43.0 (15)	2:34.4 (11)	-

* = Fell
NC = Not classified
NF = Not finished
NS = Not started
DQ = Disqualified

Source: SpeedSkatingStats.com

== Rules ==
Four distances have to be skated:

- 500m
- 1500m
- 5000m
- 10000m

The ranking was made by award ranking points. The points were awarded to the skaters who had skated all the distances. The final ranking was then decided by ordering the skaters by lowest point totals.

- 1 point for 1st place
- 2 point for 2nd place
- 3 point for 3rd place
- and so on

One could win the World Championships also by winning at least three of the four distances, so the ranking could be affected by this.

Silver and bronze medals were awarded.
