= Ovaska =

Ovaska is a Finnish surname. Notable people with the surname include:

- Asta Ovaska (born 1963), Finnish shot putter
- Jouni Ovaska (born 1986), Finnish politician
- Toivo Ovaska (1899–1966), Finnish speed skater
