= Gustl Müller =

German Nordic combined and cross-country skier

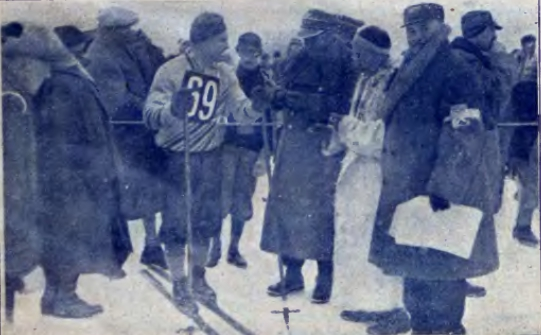
- FIS Zakopane 1929 Muller Gustav

Personal information
- Full name: Gustav Müller
- Born: 23 October 1903 Bayrischzell, German Empire
- Died: 20 September 1989 (aged 85) Bayrischzell, West Germany

Sport
- Sport: Skiing

Gustav "Gustl" Müller (23 October 1903 – 20 September 1989) was a German Nordic combined and cross-country skier.

Müller was born in Bayrischzell. At the age of 24 years, he participated at Nordic combined of the 1928 Winter Olympics, where he placed 21st in the final ranking. He also particiinted at the FIS Nordic World Ski Championships 1933, and was member of the Bronze teams at the first and second edition of the legendary Trofeo Mezzalama race, in 1933 together with Willy Bogner and Matthias Wörndle, and in 1934 together with Franz Fischer and Matthias Wörndle.

Further notable results:

- 1927:
  - 1st, German Nordic combined championships, individual
  - 1st, German cross-country skiing championships, relay, together with Viktor Schneider, Ernst Huber, Hans Bauer and Hans Theato
- 1929: 1st, German Nordic combined championships, individual
- 1930:
  - 1st, German cross-country skiing championships, 50 km
  - 1st, German cross-country skiing championships, relay, together with Willi Leiner, Ernst Krebs, Georg Hagn and Martin Neuner
- 1931:
  - 1st, German Nordic combined championships, individual
  - 1st, German cross-country skiing championships, relay, together with Willy Bogner, Ernst Krebs, Georg Hagn and Josef Ponn
- 1932: 1st, German cross-country skiing championships, relay, together with Willy Bogner, Ernst Krebs, Walter Motz and Hans Darchinger
