= Finland at the 1928 Winter Olympics =

- IOC code: FIN
- NOC: Finnish Olympic Committee
- Website: sport.fi/olympiakomitea (in Finnish and Swedish)

in St. Moritz
- Competitors: 18 (17 men, 1 woman) in 5 sports
- Flag bearer: Esko Järvinen
- Medals Ranked 4th: Gold 2 Silver 1 Bronze 1 Total 4

Winter Olympics appearances (overview)
- 1924; 1928; 1932; 1936; 1948; 1952; 1956; 1960; 1964; 1968; 1972; 1976; 1980; 1984; 1988; 1992; 1994; 1998; 2002; 2006; 2010; 2014; 2018; 2022; 2026

Finland competed at the 1928 Winter Olympics in St. Moritz, Switzerland. Finland took home 4 medals, all in speed skating. These were won by Clas Thunberg, Julius Skutnabb, and Jaakko Friman. Finland also took second place in the Military Patrol, at that time classed as a demonstration event with no medals.

== Medalists ==
Medal	Name	Sport	Event
Gold	Clas Thunberg	Speed skating	Men's 500m
Gold	Clas Thunberg	Speed skating	Men's 1500m
Silver	Julius Skutnabb	Speed skating	Men's 5000m
Bronze	Jaakko Friman	Speed skating	Men's 500m

== Cross-country skiing ==
Men

Event	Athlete	Race	
Event	Athlete	Time	Rank
18 km	Einar Mässeli	1'47:55	13
18 km	Ville Mattila	1'44:37	10
18 km	Martti Lappalainen	1'41:59	7
18 km	Veli Saarinen	1'40:57	4
50 km	Matti Raivio	DNF	–
50 km	Adiel Paananen	DNF	–
50 km	Martti Lappalainen	5'30:09	9
50 km	Tauno Lappalainen	5'18:33	6

== Figure skating ==
Men

Athlete	Event	CF	FS	Places	Points	Final rank
Marcus Nikkanen	Men's singles	4	8	46	1480.00	6

Pairs

Athletes	Points	Score	Final rank
Ludowika Jakobsson; Walter Jakobsson	51	84.00	5

== Nordic combined ==
Events:

- 18 km cross-country skiing
- normal hill ski jumping

The cross-country skiing part of this event was combined with the main medal event of cross-country skiing. Those results can be found above in this article in the cross-country skiing section. Some athletes (but not all) entered in both the cross-country skiing and Nordic combined event, their time on the 18 km was used for both events. One would expect that athletes competing at the Nordic combined event, would participate in the cross-country skiing event as well, as they would have the opportunity to win more than one medal. This was not always the case due to the maximum number of athletes that could represent a country per event.

The ski jumping (normal hill) event was held separate from the main medal event of ski jumping, results can be found in the table below.

Athlete	Event	Cross-country			Ski Jumping				Total	
Athlete	Event	Time	Points	Rank	Distance 1	Distance 2	Total points	Rank	Points	Rank
Paavo Nuotio	Individual	1'48:46	14.125	4	52.5	52.5	15.729	7	14.927	4
Esko Järvinen	Individual	1'46:23	15.375	3	46.0	48.0	14.426	16	14.810	5

== Ski jumping ==
Athlete	Event	Jump 1 (Dist.)	Jump 2 (Dist.)	Total	
Athlete	Event	Jump 1 (Dist.)	Jump 2 (Dist.)	Points	Rank
Esko Järvinen	Normal hill	45.0	47.5	13.978	22
Paavo Nuotio	Normal hill	50.0	56.0	15.833	12

== Speed skating ==
Men

Event	Athlete	Race	
Event	Athlete	Time	Rank
500 m	Toivo Ovaska	45.2	11
500 m	Bertel Backman	44.4	8
500 m	Jaakko Friman	43.6	3rd place, bronze medalist(s)
500 m	Clas Thunberg	43.4 OR	1st place, gold medalist(s)
1500 m	Bertel Backman	DNF	–
1500 m	Toivo Ovaska	2:29.3	15
1500 m	Clas Thunberg	2:21.1	1st place, gold medalist(s)
5000 m	Bertel Backman	9:14.0	13
5000 m	Clas Thunberg	9:11.8	12
5000 m	Ossi Blomqvist	9:09.9	10
5000 m	Julius Skutnabb	8:59.1	2nd place, silver medalist(s)

== Sources ==
- Comité Olympique Suisse (1928). Résultats des Concours des II^{mes} Jeux Olympiques d'hiver (PDF) (in French). Lausanne: Imprimerie du Léman. Archived from the original (PDF) on 2010-12-17.
- "Olympic Medal Winners". International Olympic Committee.
- Olympic Winter Games 1928, full results by sports-reference.com
