= Matthias Wörndle =

German cross-country skier (1909–1942)

Personal information
- Born: 7 December 1909 Partenkirchen, German Empire
- Died: 15 October 1942 (aged 32) Pshish River, Soviet Union

Sport
- Sport: Skiing
- Club: Skiclub Partenkirchen
Medal record
Representing Germany

Matthias Wörndle (7 December 1909 – 15 October 1942) was a German cross-country skier.

Wörndle was born in Partenkirchen, where he was member of the Skiclub Partenkirchen (SCP)

He was member of the Bronze teams at the first and second edition of the legendary Trofeo Mezzalama race, in 1933 together with Willy Bogner and Gustav "Gustl" Müller, and in 1934 together with Franz Fischer and Gustl Müller.

At the 1936 Winter Olympics he finished 24th in the 50 km event.

Wörndle died in the Pshish River in the Soviet Union, when he served in the army (Nazi) during World War II.
