= Wollert Nygren =

Norwegian speed skater

Personal information
- Nationality: Norwegian
- Born: 24 December 1906; Kristiania, Norway
- Died: 3 March 1988 (aged 81); Oslo

Sport
- Sport: Speed skating
- Club: Oslo SK

Wollert Nygren (24 December 1906 – 3 March 1988) was a Norwegian Olympic speed skater.

He was born and died in Oslo, and represented Oslo SK. He participated at the 1928 Winter Olympics in St. Moritz, where he placed 13th in 1500 metre speedskating.
