= Zoltán Eötvös =

Hungarian speed skater (1891–1936)

Zoltán Eötvös (5 March 1891 – 21 October 1936) was a Hungarian speed skater who competed in the 1928 Winter Olympics. He was born in Tokaj, in the Zemplén County of the Kingdom of Hungary and died in Budapest.

== Speedskating career ==
=== Hungarian championships ===
Between 1924 and 1930 Zoltán Eötvös participated in six Hungarian championships. In his first start in 1924 he finished second, but the next four editions were his, winning the event in 1925, 1926, 1927 and 1928. The last time he participated, in 1930, brought him a third place.

=== 1928 Winter Olympics ===
In 1928 he finished tenth in the 1500 metres event, 19th in the 500 metres competition, and 20th in the 5000 metres event.

=== World championships ===
Zoltán Eötvös was also a participant at the 1928 World championships in Davos, finishing 18th overall after a 500m as 17th and a 5000m as 23rd on the first day and on the second day a 16th place at the 1500m and a 21st place at the concluding 10,000m

=== European championships ===
In 1929 Zoltán Eötvös participated in the European championships in Davos, finishing 15th overall after a 12th place at the 500m, an 8th place at the 5000m on the first day and an 8th place at the 1500m at the second day. 1932 saw him again in Davos for a European championship, but after finishing the 500m as 8th he gave up for the rest of the tournament.

== Personal records ==
Personal records
Men's Speed skating
Event	Result	Date	Location	Notes
500 m	45.7	1 February 1931	Davos	Davos Eisstadion
1,000 m	1:35.6	11 January 1930	Davos	Eisstadion
1,500 m	2:27.9	14 February 1928	St. Moritz	St. Moritz Olympic Ice Rink
3,000 m	5:51.2	8 January 1932	Davos	Eisstadion
5,000 m	9:04.3	2 February 1931	Davos	Eisstadion
10,000 m	19:10.2	5 February 1928	Davos	Eisstadion
