= Latvia at the 1928 Winter Olympics =

- IOC code: LAT
- NOC: Latvian Olympic Committee
- Website: www.olimpiade.lv (in Latvian and English)

in St. Moritz
- Competitors: 1 in 1 sport
- Flag bearer: Alberts Rumba (speed skating)
- Medals: Gold 0 Silver 0 Bronze 0 Total 0

Winter Olympics appearances (overview)
- 1924; 1928; 1932; 1936; 1948–1988; 1992; 1994; 1998; 2002; 2006; 2010; 2014; 2018; 2022; 2026; 2030

Other related appearances
- Soviet Union (1956–1988)

Latvia participated at the 1928 Winter Olympics in St. Moritz, Switzerland, held between 11 and 19 February 1928. The country's participation in the Games marked its second appearance at the Winter Olympics since its debut in the previous Games.

The Latvian team consisted of a lone athlete Alberts Rumba who competed across three events in speed skating. Rumba also served as the country's flag-bearer during the opening ceremony. Latvia did not win any medal in the Games.

== Background ==
The 1924 Winter Olympics marked Latvia's first participation in the Olympic Games. After the nation made its debut in the Winter Olympics at the previous Games, this edition of the Games in 1928 marked the nation's second appearance at the Winter Games.

The 1928 Winter Olympics was held in St. Moritz, Switzerland, between 11 and 19 February 1928. The Latvian delegation consisted of a lone athlete Alberts Rumba. Rumba also served as the country's flag-bearer in the Parade of Nations during the opening ceremony. Latvia did not win any medal in the Games.

== Competitors ==
Latvia sent a single athlete who competed in three events in a single sport at the Games.

Sport	Men	Women	Athletes
Speed skating	1	0	1
Total	1	0	1

== Speed skating ==
Speed skating competitions were held on 13 and 14 February at the Olympia-Eisstadion Badrutts Park in St. Moritz. Alberts Rumba participated in three events in the competition. This was Rumba's second appearance at the Winter Olympics after his debut in the 1924 Games. In between the Games, he appeared in two World Championships placing fifth (1926) and seventh (1927). He was the reigning Latvian all-round champion since 1926. In the Games, he recorded a best place finish of 14th in the 1500 m event.

Athlete	Event	Time	Rank
Alberts Rumba	Men's 500 m	46.3	16
Alberts Rumba	Men's 1500 m	2:28.9	14
Alberts Rumba	Men's 5000 m	9:19.7	15
