= Siem Heiden =

Dutch speed skater

Personal information
- Born: 12 March 1905 Andijk, Netherlands
- Height: 3 August 1993 (aged 88)

Sport
- Country: Netherlands
- Sport: Speed skating

Simon "Siem" Heiden (12 March 1905 – 3 August 1993) was a Dutch speed skater who competed in the 1928 Winter Olympics.

He was born in IJsselmonde and died in Rotterdam.

In 1928 Winter Olympics, he finished eleventh in the 5000 metres event, 18th in the 1500 metres competition and 27th in the 500 metres event.

When he broke the 5000 meters world record in 1933, he was a member of athletic and football club Feyenoord. The chairman of the club, Leen van Zandvliet, congratulated him for his performance.

Simon was engaged into an incident during the 2nd World War, when defending Dordrecht. He was asked to shoot a paratrooper that was wounded, however, Simon carried him to safety as he was a fellow olimpian.

== World record ==
Discipline	Time	Date	Location
5000 m	8.19,2	22 January 1933	Davos

== Tournament summary ==
Season	Dutch Championships Allround	European Championships Allround	World Championships Allround	Olympic Games
1927–1929

Source: SpeedSkatingStats.com

Records
Preceded by (Norway) Ivar Ballangrud	Men's 5000 m World Record Holder; 22 January 1933 – 3 February 1934	Succeeded by (Austria) Max Stiepl
