= List of Lithuanian records in speed skating =

The following are the national records in speed skating in Lithuania maintained by the Lithuanian Skating Federation. There are different sources with different record marks.

== Men ==
Event	Record	Athlete	Date	Meet	Place	Ref
500 meters	46.50	Valentin Zemin	4 March 1963		Ekaterinburg, Russia	
500 meters	44.80	Mečislovas Sazanskis	3 March 1970		Chelyabinsk, Russia	
1000 meters	1:48.90	Kestutis Bulota	28 January 1927			
1500 meters	2:28.90	Jonas Dailide	6 March 1963		Ekaterinburg, Russia	
3000 meters	5:35.40	Ivan Pokhotskij	1 March 1967		Nizhny Novgorod, Russia	
5000 meters	8:43.70	Ljudas Baradas	4 March 1967		Nizhny Novgorod, Russia	
10000 meters	18:26.50	Ljudas Baradas	5 March 1967		Nizhny Novgorod, Russia	

== Women ==
Event	Record	Athlete	Date	Meet	Place	Ref
500 meters	54.10	Sofija Zjeromskaja	4 March 1963		Ekaterinburg, Russia	
1000 meters	1:52.80	Gene Patskevitsjute	2 March 1967		Nizhny Novgorod, Russia	
1500 meters	2:53.20	Sofija Zjeromskaja	6 March 1963		Ekaterinburg, Russia	
3000 meters	6:09.30	Vala Trepotskaite	3 March 1967		Nizhny Novgorod, Russia	
5000 meters	12:00.60	Z. Novikova	19 January 1951		Petrozavodsk, Russia	
