= Yakov Melnikov =

Soviet and Russian speed skater

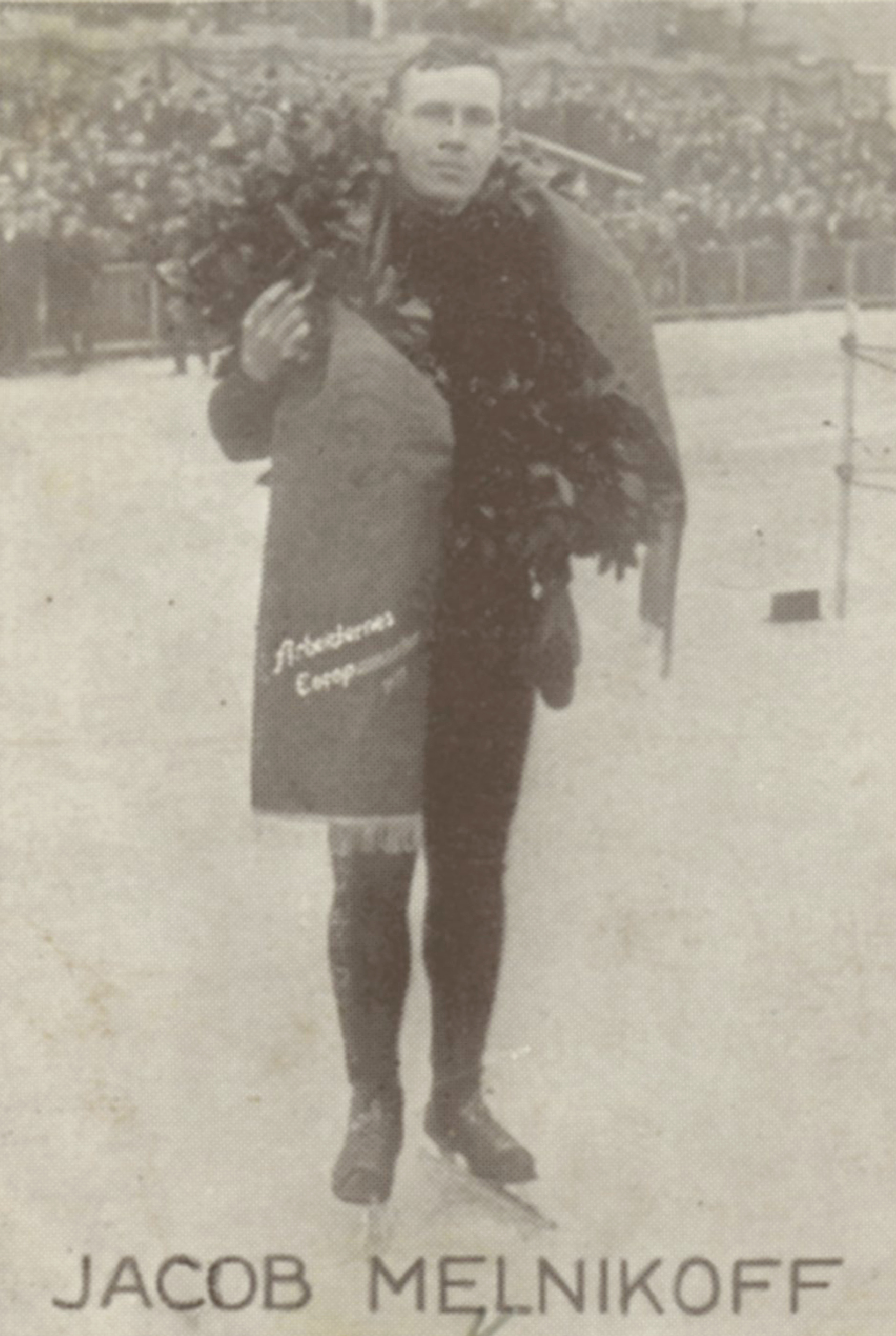
- Melnikov, c. 1930

Personal information
- Born: 13 January 1896 Moscow, Russian Empire
- Died: 12 July 1960 (aged 64) Moscow, Soviet Union

Sport
- Country: Russian Empire; USSR
- Sport: Speed skating
Medal record
Representing Soviet Union
Bronze medal – third place	1923 Stockholm	Allround

Yakov Fyodorovich Melnikov (Russian: Яков Фёдорович Мельников; January 13, 1896 – July 12, 1960) was a Russian and Soviet speed skater. First recipient of the Honoured Master of Sports of the USSR (1934).

He was the bronze medalist of the 1923 World Allround Speed Skating Championships. Melnikov set 27 national records.

He first started in the Russian championship in 1913. He last went on the ice as a participant in the country's championship in 1941. The last champion and record holder of the Russian Empire. The first champion of the RSFSR.
