= Maria Bogner =

German fashion designer

- Bogner and sister modeling her ski apparel ca. late 1940s.
- Born: Maria Lux; 1914; Cologne, Germany
- Died: 17 November 2002 (aged 87–88); Tegernsee, Germany
- Occupation: Fashion designer
- Years active: 1932-1972
- Employer(s): Willy Bogner, GMBH
- Spouse(s): Willy Bogner, Sr.
- Children: 3

Maria Bogner (née Lux, 1914 – 17 November 2002) was a German fashion designer credited with developing practical stretch pants, thereby profoundly affecting the direction of the ski fashion industry. She created colorful, sexy, and functional stretchy skiwear. Her husband's established ski apparel company, the development of stretch material in the 1950s, and her sewing skills all contributed to her success. Her stretch pants, as modeled by leading ski athletes of the period, provided aerodynamic, form-fitting cut, color variety and practicality as ski garments.

== Personal life ==
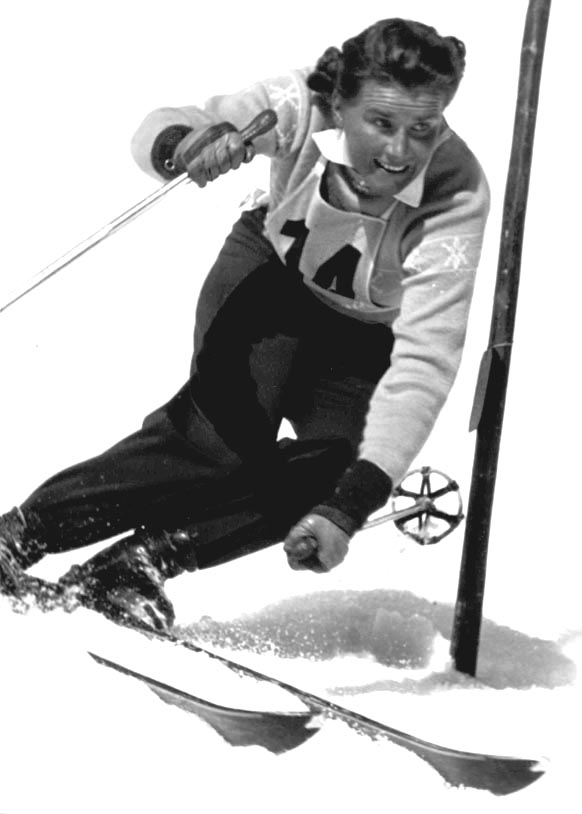
Skiwear in the 1950s, prior to the adoption of stretch pants.

Bogner was born Maria Lux in 1914 in Cologne and died on 17 November 2002 in Tegernsee. In 1937 she married Wilhelm Bogner (Willy Sr.), a German Nordic combined ski champion who competed in the 1930s. Together, they had three children, Rosemarie, Michael, and Wilhelm (Willy Jr.). Willy Bogner's success as a skier allowed him and his future wife, then Maria Lux, to establish a clothing line in 1932, that included outfitting the German national ski team at the 1936 Winter Olympics.

Her husband died in 1977 and she died in 2002.

== Career ==
=== Pre-WWII ===
Skiing Magazine called Bogner, “the mother of modern ski fashion”, citing her outsized influence as a woman on ski culture. Her career began with the development of novel ski garments in the early 1930s and was interrupted by World War II.

In 1936 Bogner created an anorak (parka) for the German Olympic ski team of which her fiancé was a member. After their marriage, Bogner became involved in the fashion side of her husband's business, which included importing ski equipment. In addition to ski apparel, they designed and manufactured blouses, traditional Bavarian dresses, as well as hiking apparel. The growth of their business was interrupted by WWII and her husband's internment by the US.

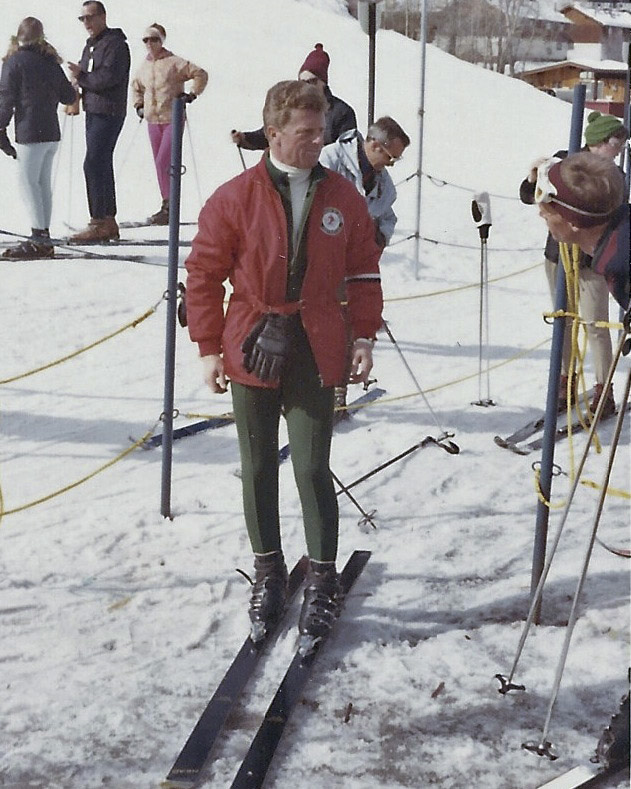
Stein Eriksen and other skiers wearing stretch pants in 1967.

=== Post-WWII ===
After the war her ski fashion innovations in style and color, especially with stretch pants, allowed the Bogner business to flourish in the upscale ski apparel market. While her husband was away and in order to support her three children, Bogner continued to design colorful anoraks that were sold by the thousands. In addition to creating and selling parkas, Bogner also began rebuilding the business by creating other products, such as aprons. In 1950, the Bogners began exporting their colorful products to the US, including Bogner's parkas. In 1955 Bogner began branding the company with a logo, styled as a “B”, on all zippers found on their clothing.

=== Early 1950s, stretch pants ===
In the early 1950s, the Bogners were manufacturing ski pants in gabardine fabric. They were distinctive both for their durability and the wide choice of bright, appealing colors—a break from the previous standards of black, blue and forest green. In 1951, a Bianchini-Férier (fr) textile representative introduced Bogner to a new material, with a crimp elasticized yarn, developed by the Swiss company, Heberlein (de), and marketed under the name, Helanca (cs de), which was incorporated into a prototype pair of ski pants. Helanca was a blend of wool and a springy, coiled nylon fiber, which allowed the material to stretch and be durable through multiple wash cycles. The problem was how to sew it successfully, which Bogner solved. Early examples of her stretch pants lost their resiliency after a few seasons. This problem was solved such that by 1955, she was exporting them to the US in 42 different colors. The pants were highly successful, despite costing double what conventional ski pants cost at the time, thanks to their aerodynamic, sexy, form-fitting cut and wide variety of colors. The product was marketed effectively in catalogs and advertisements, using attractive young women and celebrity athletes, such as Stein Eriksen, as models.

=== 1960s to retirement ===
The publicity and advertising of the Bogner line of up-scale fashion made it the choice of such celebrity consumers of ski apparel as, Marilyn Monroe, Ingrid Bergman, the Shah of Iran, and Toni Sailer. Bogner apparel was also in demand by ski teams for its aerodynamic efficiency and warmth. By the mid-1960s, many other companies were producing stretch pants. Bogner remained active in the company until the early 1970s, when her sons, Michael and Willy Jr., took over the business.

== Legacy ==
Bogner's creation was so widely recognized that she was featured on the cover of the November 1955 issue of Ski Magazine, wearing her ski apparel. In its 1995 "Skiing for Women" issue, Skiing magazine cited Bogner as a skiing "legend", along with Andrea Mead Lawrence and Martha Rockwell
