= Otto Wahl =

German cross-country skier (1904–1935)

Personal information
- Nationality: German
- Born: 9 July 1904; Zella-Mehlis, Germany
- Died: 1 July 1935 (aged 30); Zella-Mehlis, Germany

Sport
- Sport: Cross-country skiing

Otto Wahl (9 July 1904 – 1 July 1935) was a German cross-country skier. He competed in the men's 18 kilometre event at the 1928 Winter Olympics.
