= Otto Polacsek =

Austrian speed skater

Otto Polacsek (June 23, 1904 – unknown) was an Austrian speed skater who competed in the 1928 Winter Olympics.

In 1928 he finished eighth in the 5000 metres event and 21st in the 500 metres competition. He also started in the abandoned 10000 metres competition.
