= Martin Neuner =

German ski jumper

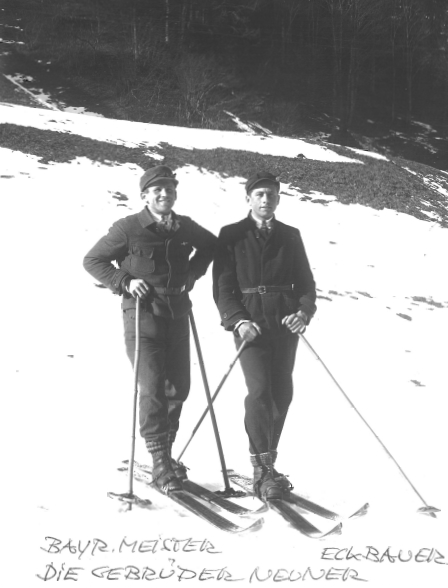
Martin Neuner and his brother Karl.

Martin Neuner (14 December 1900 – 2 August 1944) was a German ski jumper who competed in the 1928 Winter Olympics.
