= Wolfgang Kittel =

German ice hockey player

Wolfgang Alexander Kittel (November 11, 1899, Charlottenburg – February 27, 1967, Bad Homburg vor der Höhe) was a German ice hockey player. Kittel played on the German men's national ice hockey team at the 1928 Winter Olympics, before switching to civil aviation in 1928.

== Life ==
Kittel was the son of a medical doctor specializing in rheumatic diseases Dr. Miesko Kittel (1856–1923), operating in Franzensbad / Bohemia and Merano / Italy and his first wife Auguste Juliane Alice Reschke (1869-1925). Kittel attended school in Eger (Cheb) and Cilli (Austria). Afterwards he was trained at the Innsbruck Officer School and then joined a Kaiserjäger Regiment on the Isonzo battlefront. After the war he joined a "Freikorps" in the Baltic Area, before inscribing at the Munich and Berlin Technical Universities. He did not finish his studies with a degree.

From 1924 to 1928 he worked for the Lohmann - Group. Before 1928 Kittel became a member of the "Berliner Schlittschuhclub" (ice skating /ice hockey) and thus became German Champion in the 1928 Season. He was on the German Team at the 1928 Olympic Games at St. Moritz. At the 1927 European Games he and his team were awarded a bronze medal. He took part for Germany in two International Games.

== Career in civil aviation ==
In 1928 Kittel sailed to Barranquilla, Colombia, working for SCADTA-Airlines (Sociedad Colombo Alemana de Transportes Aereos) until 1938. In that year he returned to Germany for health reasons. Immediately he started to research his non-Jewish ancestors in Poland, permitting him to apply for a job with LUFTHANSA in 1939. Helping out a friend he became the company's resident (and jointly German Consul) at Bathurst, British West Gambia. In the same year he was arrested there by the British and deported to England. For further internment in Canada (due to British fear of the German Invasion) he was on the Arandora Star, that was torpedoed and sunk by the German submarine boat "U-47" with captain Günther Prien on July 2, 1940 at 6.58 A.M. Kittel survived in the icy waters until saved by the Canadian destroyer St. Laurent at around 4 P.M. He was returned to England and almost immediately after this harrowing experience placed on HMT Dunera, this time for deportation to Australia. Before reaching Cape Town there was a mutiny on board which Kittel helped to put down.

According to his second wife Ingeborg Kittel née Gerlach (1921-2018) he was disembarked at Cape Town and returned to England on a civilian boat and in a first class cabin, unescorted and on his word of honour, in order to be able to testify at the inevitable courts martial. This plausible chain of events needed a review: that a captain should be permitted to send someone to England in a first-class cabin from Cape Town to London now seems to be out of the question. The value of Kittel lay in his having been "consul" - a diplomatist - when deported from Bathurst by the British. After Kittel's departure from London to Australia someone of the so called "offices" (of war, of the interior etc.) must have found out that Britain was losing a diplomat, who in the international game of swapping such jewels against a comparable figure who had been deported by the enemy. Another example of this practice was the deportation of Kittel's future father-in-law consul general Professor Dr. Werner Gerlach from Reykjavik, Iceland, together with his wife and two daughters. The Gerlach family was "traded in" (1941) with ambassador Sir Lancelot Oliphant who published "An ambassador in Bonds" in 1946, Chiswick Press, London. Kittel's whereabouts until Christmas of 1940 have not been documented. At that point in time he surfaced at Dunluce House, Ramsey on the Isle of Man, a villa for VIPs and diplomatists, where he met his future father and mother-in-law: professor doctor Werner Gerlach - the German Consul General at Reykjavik / Iceland, who had been deported to England by the British - with wife and two daughters - in May 1940. This was where Wolfgang Kittel met his future second wife, Gerlach's elder daughter Ingeborg. Also interned at Dunluce house were Werner T. Schaurte, the Neuss industrialist and his companion count Lothar von Hoensbroech, who had been in Canada on a hunting expedition. Incidentally, Hoensbroech and Gerlach had met and become friends in Turkey at the end of the first world war, where Gerlach was a medical officer at the Haidar Pascha Hospital in Istanbul. After the departure of the Gerlachs for Germany, Dunluce House was no longer used. In the spring of 1941 Wolfgang Kittel was already documented at Parkfield: not a camp, but a villa.

Since all official documents concerning male internees on the Isle of Man during the war, have mysteriously vanished, Kittel's repatriation on 26 May 1943 via Lisbon to Berlin is documented by his "Foreign Office" file (see below); he then proposed marriage to Ingeborg Gerlach and they married on September 15, 1943, at the German Embassy in Paris. Kittel then became manager of the Neuss firm Bauer & Schaurte from 1943 to 1945 when he was again interned by the British from 1945 to 1947 due to the denunciation of his elder sister Elsa Löffler née Kittel. It took him two years to gain access to the British archive in the Camp, so that he could prove why in the first place he was interned and secondly the falseness of his sister's deposition.

From 1947 to 1952 Kittel was the manager of the Matthes Fischer firm in Düsseldorf-Oberkassel, who produced metal boxes with printed decoration. In 1954/55 he joined the newly founded Deutsche Lufthansa at Cologne, later in Hamburg. He was General Manager of the company in New York from 1955 to 1959, when he became a member of the board in Cologne. Retiring in 1965 he was appointed head of the Deutsche Zentrale für Fremdenverkehr (tourism) until he died in early 1967 in Bad Homburg.

== Family ==
On 17 July 1922 Kittel in Budapest married his first wife Carola Mathilde Elfriede Remy. They did not have children and the marriage was dissolved in Berlin in 1939. He married secondly on September 15, 1943, in Paris Ingeborg Gerlach. They had two sons: Werner Kittel, born 3 March 1945 Garmisch-Partenkirchen, founder of the Kunstarchiv (art archive) Kittel, (now in the Kunst- und Museumsbibliothek der Stadt Köln) and Gerd Kittel, born 17 Nov. 1948 Düsseldorf, medical doctor, who later became a landscape photographer.

== Merits and distinctions ==
- 1927 Bronze Medal at the EUROPEAN championship
- 1928 German Champion with the Berliner Schlittschuhclub
- 1959 Dwight D. Eisenhower Peace Medal
- 1964 Great Cross of Merit with Star of the Federal Republic of Germany (original at the IPG at Bensheim)
- 1964 Honorary Professor of the Papal University Xaveriana in Bogotá, Colombia (Spanish: Pontificia Universidad Javeriana (PUJ)
