= Esko Järvinen =

Nordic combined skier, ski jumper and military patrol runner (1907–1976)

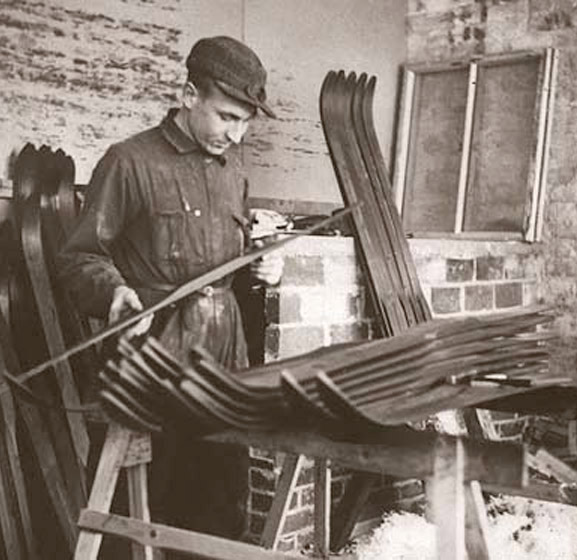
- Järvinen inspecting skis at his factory in 1940

Personal information
- Full name: Kauko Esko Järvinen
- Nationality: (Finland) Finnish
- Born: 15 December 1907 Lahti, Finland
- Died: 7 March 1976 (aged 68) Helsinki, Finland

Sport
- Sport: Skiing
- Club: Lahden Hiihtoseura, Lahti
Medal record
Representing Finland
World Championships
Bronze medal – third place	1929 Zakopane	Nordic combined

Kauko Esko Järvinen (15 December 1907 – 7 March 1976) was a Finnish competitor in the Nordic combined and military patrol (precursor to biathlon). He won an individual bronze medal in the Nordic combined at the 1929 World Championships. At the 1928 Winter Olympics he finished fifth in the Nordic combined and 22nd in the ski jumping event. He also placed second in the team military patrol, which was a demonstration sport at those Olympics, and served as the flag bearer for Finland at the opening ceremony.

After retiring from competitions Järvinen opened a ski manufacturing factory in Lahti, which ran until 1974 and went bankrupt in 1991, yet his son continued small-scale production of wooden skis. His brother Erkki was an Olympic triple jumper.

== Gallery ==
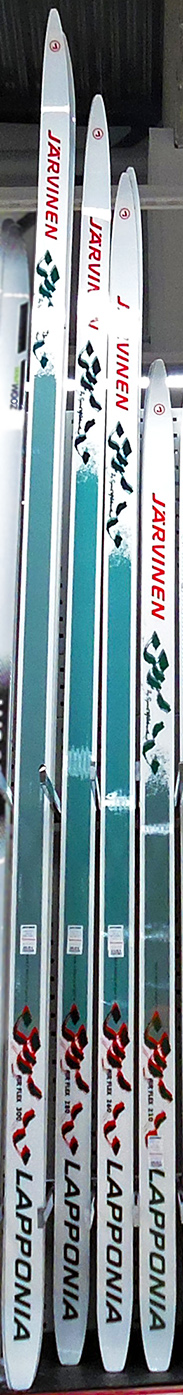
Järvinen Lapponia skis

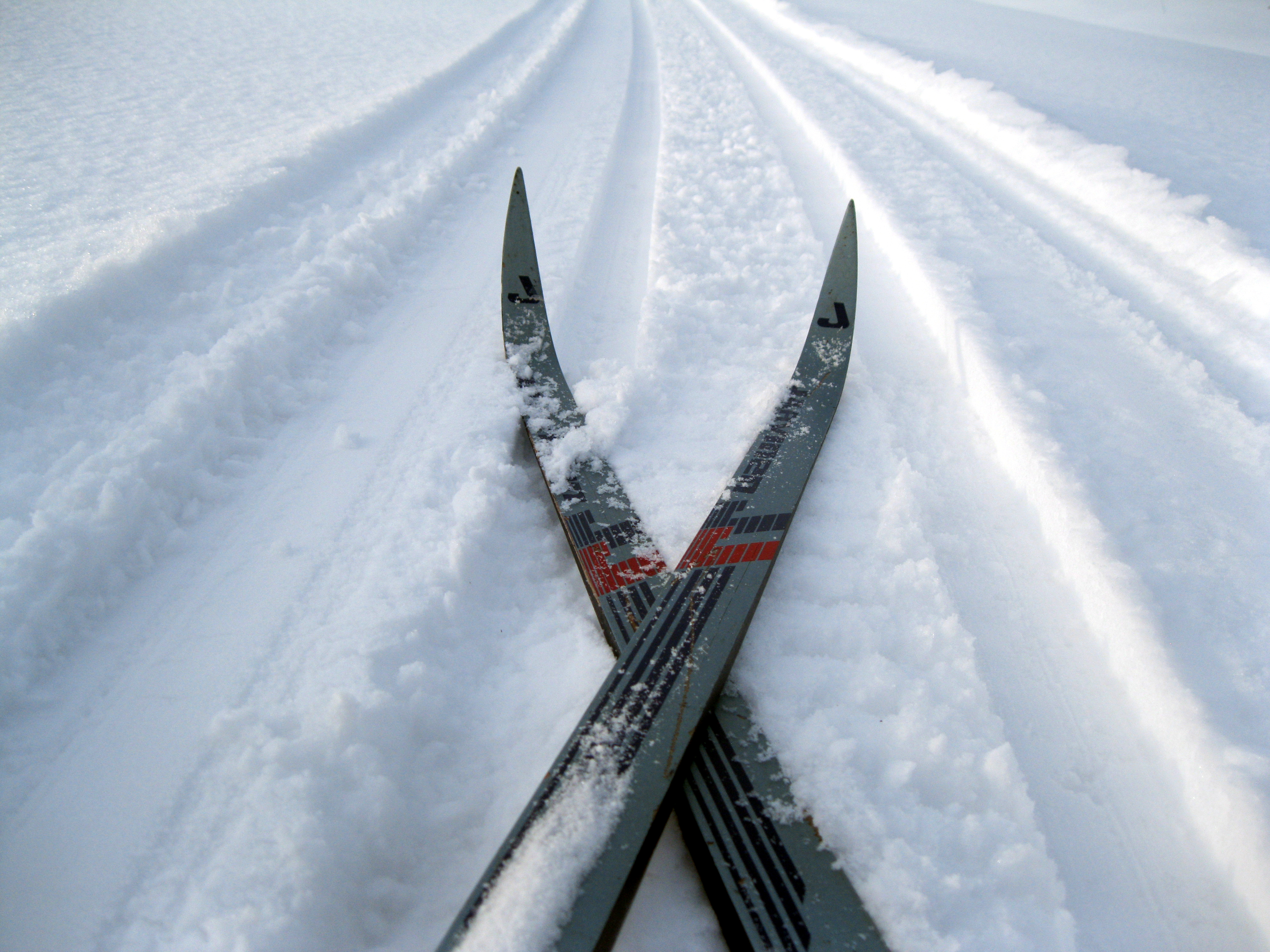
Järvinen skis
