= Willy Bogner Jr. =

German fashion designer, film maker and former alpine ski racer

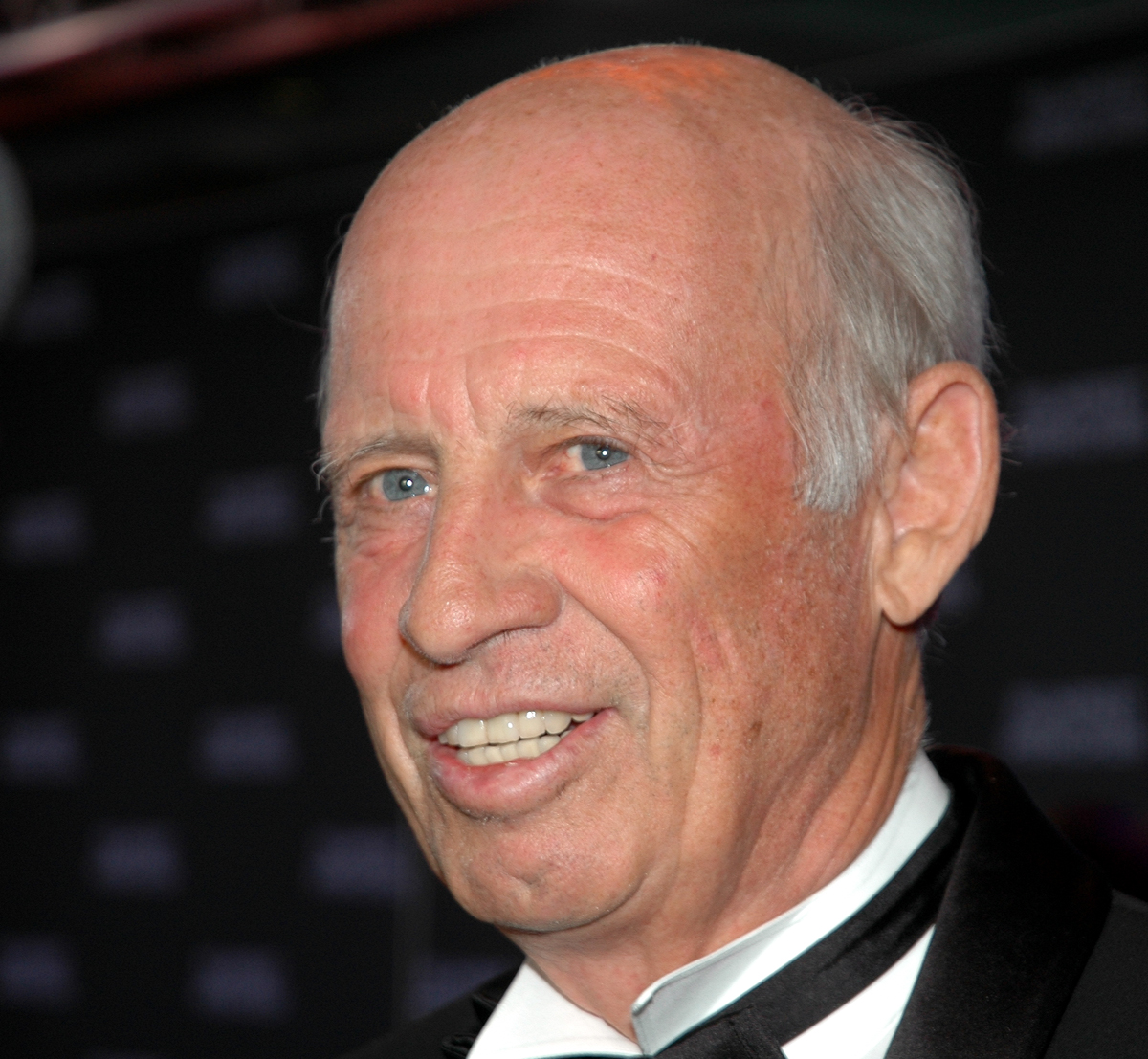
- Bogner in 2014
- Born: Wilhelm Herman Björn Bogner; 23 January 1942 (age 84); Munich, Germany
- Occupations: Fashion designer, alpine skier
- Label: Bogner
- Spouse: Sônia Ribeiro (m. 1972; died 2017)
- Parent(s): Willy Bogner Sr., Maria Bogner
- Awards: Goldene Seidenschleife; Bambi Award

Wilhelm Hermann Björn Bogner Jr. (born 23 January 1942) is a German fashion designer, film maker and former alpine ski racer. He inherited the Bogner clothing brand, originally set up as Willy-Bogner-Skivertrieb by his father, Willy Bogner Sr., and expanded through the efforts of his mother, Maria, who is credited with the introduction of stretch pants to the ski fashion world.

== Personal life ==
Bogner was born in Munich, to Wilhelm (Willy Sr.) and Maria Bogner in 1942.

Bogner married the Brazilian model, Sônia Ribeiro, a sister of Florinda Bolkan in 1972. The couple adopted two Brazilian children, Florinda and Bernhard. His wife died on 3 May 2017 at the age of 66.

== Skiing ==
Bogner competed for the United Team of Germany shortly after turning 18 at the 1960 Winter Olympics in Squaw Valley. He led the competition in the men's slalom after the first run, but fell during the second run. That season, he won the prestigious Lauberhorn downhill at Wengen, Switzerland. In 1962, he became double World Student Games champion in alpine skiing's slalom and alpine combined event.

His best result in the World Championships was a fourth place in the slalom (and fifth place in the combined) at the 1966 World Championships in August in Portillo, Chile.

Bogner was a familiar face in the international ski scene until 1967, when he decided to concentrate his efforts on film-making.

== Film making ==
In April 1964, Bogner was filming scenes of Ski Fascination (1966), his first production of a ski fashion movie. He led a group of 14 world-class skiers in the Engadine Val Selin in Switzerland, near St. Moritz, below Trais Fluors, where an avalanche occurred, burying several members of the group. The bodies of Bogner's girlfriend Barbi Henneberger and American Buddy Werner were recovered. Bogner, 22, and Henneberger were to be engaged that summer; he was tried by a Swiss court for homicide by negligence. Initially acquitted, the prosecution later won a conviction on appeal, of manslaughter by negligence, and Bogner received a two-month suspended sentence.

He worked as a cameraman in several films requiring complex ski footage. His most notable film work is in the James Bond films from 1969 through 1985, On Her Majesty's Secret Service, The Spy Who Loved Me, For Your Eyes Only and A View to a Kill – for which he won the Bambi Award in 1985 and the Bavarian Film Award, Special Prize, in 1986. Playing James Bond in all but the first of these, Roger Moore wears Bogner ski wear, as do many other characters in skiing scenes.

== Fashion industry ==
Bogner launched his first sports apparel collection, Formula W in 1971. He established an American manufacturing plant in Newport, Vermont in 1973 and debuted a tennis fashion line in 1974. His company introduced a golf fashion line in 1976. When his father died in 1977, Bogner returned to Munich from America to assume control of the company. In 1983, the company introduced a line of sunglasses. As of 2018, his company showed a decline in sales, having lost its 82-year franchise to outfit the German Winter Olympic squad to Adidas for the 2018 Winter Olympics, and amid suggestions that the company under his leadership had lost its advantages over its competitors.

== Honors and legacy ==
Bogner received the Bundesverdienstkreuz (Order of Merit of the Federal Republic of Germany) medal on 30 May 1996. In 1999 he was awarded the Goldene Seidenschleife ("Golden Ribbon of Silk") to recognise excellence in enterprise. Other honors include:

- Bambi Award (1985)
- Bavarian Film Awards (1987)
- Modepreis der Stadt München (1994)
- Brand of the Century (2007)
- Woodrow Wilson Award (2008)
- Bavarian Order of Merit (2008)
- Portrait in Germany's Sports Hall of Fame (2013)

== Filmography as producer, director or cameraman ==
- 1966: Ski Fascination (also cameraman)
- 1968: Männer, Mädchen und Medaillen (13 jours en France; cameraman only)
- 1969: James Bond 007 – On Her Majesty's Secret Service (cameraman only)
- 1970: Jill in the Box / Stehaufmädchen (also cameraman)
- 1972: Snow Job (cameraman only)
- 1972: Benjamin / Benjamin − Ein Meister fällt vom Himmel (also cameraman)
- 1977: James Bond 007 – The Spy Who Loved Me (cameraman only)
- 1981: James Bond 007 – For Your Eyes Only (cameraman only)
- 1985: James Bond 007 – A View to a Kill (director of the ski scenes)
- 1986: Fire and Ice (Feuer und Eis) (also cameraman)
- 1990: Fire, Ice and Dynamite (Feuer, Eis und Dynamit)
- 1994: White Magic (also cameraman)
- 1999: Mountain Magic
- 2001: Ski to the Max
