= Willy Bogner Sr. =

German skier and entrepreneur (1909–1977)

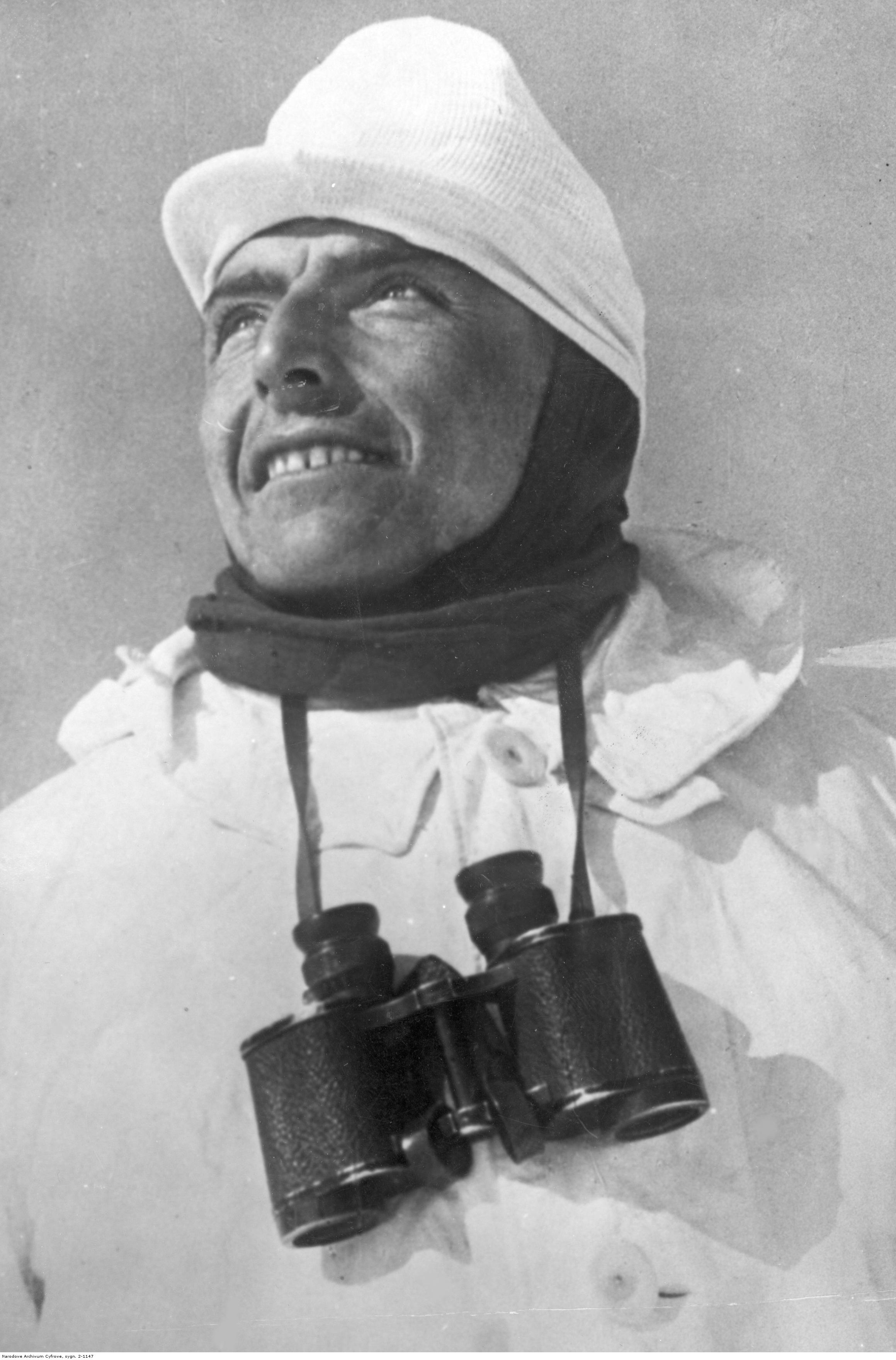
- Bogner in 1942

Personal information
- Full name: Wilhelm Bogner
- Born: 7 February 1909 Traunstein, German Empire
- Died: 27 July 1977 (aged 68) Hausham, West Germany

Sport
- Sport: Skiing
- Club: Münchner Skiläufer Vereinigung
Medal record
Men's Nordic skiing
World Championships
Silver medal – second place	1934 Sollefteå	4 x 10 km
Bronze medal – third place	1935 Vysoké Tatry	Nordic combined

Wilhelm Bogner Sr. (7 February 1909 – 27 July 1977) was a German Nordic combined skier who competed in the 1930s. He and his wife, Maria, co-founded a ski apparel company that bore their name. Bogner was a member of the Nazi party and held the rank of Untersturmführer.

== Personal life ==
Bogner was born on 7 February 1909 in Traunstein, Germany and died on 27 July 1977 in Hausham, Germany. In 1937 he married Maria Lux, an athletic woman who joined his company to design sports apparel in 1932. Together, they had three children, Rosemarie, Michael, and Wilhelm (Willy Jr.) They established a clothing line led to outfitting the German national ski team at the 1936 Winter Olympics.

== Skiing career ==
Bogner won a pair of medals at the FIS Nordic World Ski Championships with a silver in the 4 × 10 km event in 1934 and a bronze in the Nordic combined in 1935. Bogner Sr. also finished 6th in the 4 × 10 km event and 12th in the Nordic combined at the 1936 Winter Olympics in Garmisch-Partenkirchen, where he also took the Olympic Oath. During his career, Bogner Sr. was an eleven-time German and five-time Nordic skiing champion. In 1933, he participated together with Matthias Wörndle and Gustav "Gustl" Müller at the first Trofeo Mezzalama event, where they placed third.

== Nazi membership ==
Bogner joined the Schutzstaffel branch of the Nazi Party in April 1933. He competed athletically for the SS in cross-country skiing and achieved the rank of Untersturmführer in 1939.

== Ski apparel company ==
Bogner's success as a skier allowed him and his wife, Maria, to establish a clothing line in 1932, that included outfitting the German national ski team at the 1936 Winter Olympics. Following his stay as a POW during World War II, Bogner Sr. returned to their business in 1947. His wife's development of stretch pants in the early 1950s led to their adoption by such celebrities as Marilyn Monroe, Jayne Mansfield, and Ingrid Bergman and contributed to the prosperity of the firm.

== Legacy ==
His son, Willy Bogner Jr. (born 1942), was a successful alpine skier in the late 1950s and 1960s who competed for Germany at the 1960 Winter Olympics in Squaw Valley and the 1964 Winter Olympics in Innsbruck. Bogner Jr. would later go into filmmaking in 1967, then follow into Bogner Sr.'s footsteps and start his own ski collection in 1971.

Bogner Sr. died in 1977. Bogner Jr. took over the line and oversaw further growth and marketing success until 2014 when its costumes for the German Winter Olympics team drew unfavorable review and the company was seeking a buyer. As of 2018, sales were in decline and the company had not found a new buyer.
