= Bertel Backman =

Finnish speed skater

Bertel Fredrik Aulis Backman (June 10, 1905 – July 3, 1981) was a Finnish speed skater who competed in the 1928 Winter Olympics. In 1928 he finished eighth in the 500 metres event and 13th in the 5000 metres competition. He also participated in the 1500 metres event but did not finish.
