= Paavo Nuotio =

Finnish ski jumper and Nordic combined skier (1901–1968)

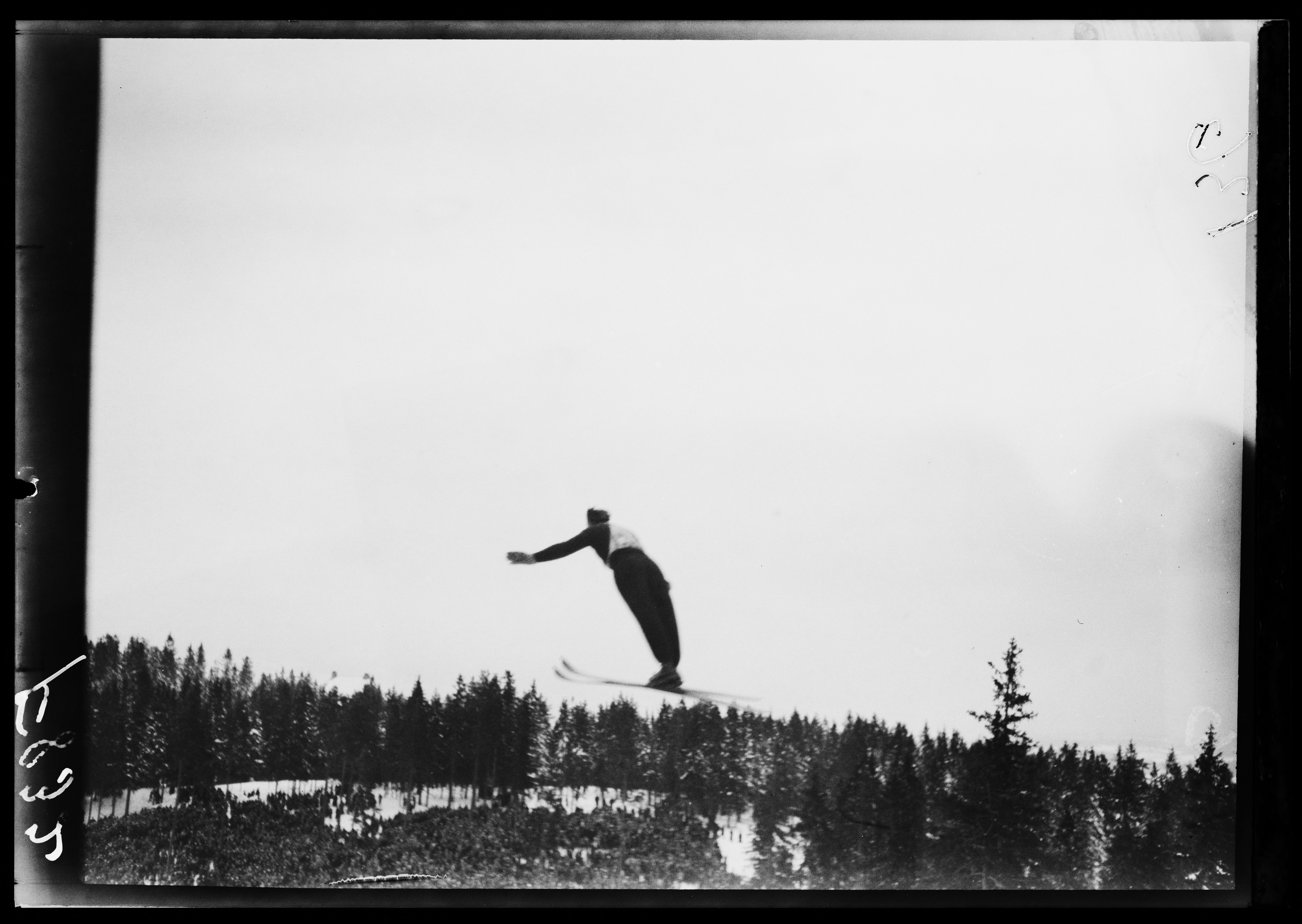
- Paavo Nuotio in 1933

Personal information
- Nationality: Finnish
- Born: 13 March 1901; Heinola
- Died: 14 November 1968 (aged 67)

Sport
- Sport: Ski jumping Nordic combined skiing

Paavo Nuotio (13 March 1901 – 14 November 1968) was a Finnish ski jumper and Nordic combined skier. He was born in Heinola. He competed at the 1928 Winter Olympics in St. Moritz, where he placed fourth in Nordic combined and 12th in ski jumping.
