= Armand Carlsen =

Norwegian speed skater

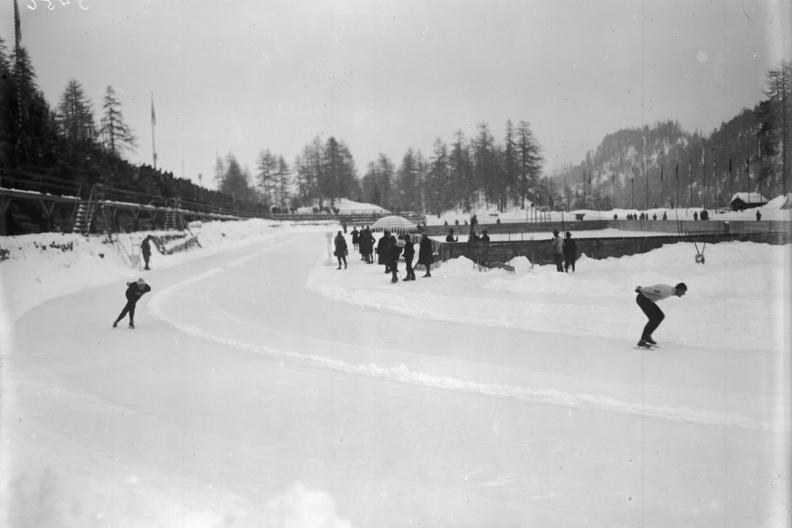
The race between Carlsen (left) and Erhard Mayke (right) at the 1928 Winter Olympics

Armand Henning Carlsen (20 October 1905 – 8 May 1969) was a Norwegian speed skater who competed in the 1928 Winter Olympics.

In 1928 he finished fifth in the 5000 metres event. He also started in the abandoned 10000 metres competition. He held the world record in the 10,000 metres distance between 1928 and 1939, clocking in 17:17.4 minutes at the 1928 World Championships. His other personal best times were 46.5 seconds in the 500 metres (1931); 2.23.6 minutes in the 1500 metres (1928); and 8.34.0 minutes in the 5000 metres (1928).

He represented the club Oslo SK, and chaired the Norwegian Skating Association from 1956 to 1961. For his achievements in both speed skating and cycling, he was awarded the Egebergs Ærespris in 1929.

== World record ==
Discipline	Time	Date	Location
10,000 m	17:17.4	5 February 1928	(Switzerland) Davos

Source: SpeedSkatingStats.com

Records
Preceded by Oscar Mathisen	Men's 10000 m World Record Holder; 5 February 1928 – 6 February 1938	Succeeded by Ivar Ballangrud
Awards
Preceded by Bernt Evensen	Egebergs Ærespris; 1929 (together with Reidar Jørgensen)	Succeeded by Fritjof Bergheim (1931)
Sporting positions
Preceded by Nils W. Simensen	President of the Norwegian Skating Association; 1956–1961	Succeeded by Georg Krog
