= Hans Peter Schmid =

Climatologist

Hans Peter Schmid is a climatologist. He is director of the Institute of Meteorology and Climate Research - Atmospheric Environmental Research of the Karlsruhe Institute of Technology (KIT/IMK-IFU) based in Garmisch-Partenkirchen. He is also Professor of Atmospheric Environmental Research at the Center of Life and Food Sciences Weihenstephan at the Technical University of Munich (TUM).

Schmid studied at ETH Zurich from 1978 and graduated in 1984 with the work: "The Horizontal Wind Field in the area of the City of Zurich" as a natural scientist. He wrote his dissertation at the University of British Columbia. In 2005 he was appointed professor at Indiana University and in 2007 at KIT.

== Publications ==
List of publications of Hans Peter Schmids at his personal site at KIT/IMK-IFU
