= Hans Bauer (cross-country skier) =

German cross-country skier (1903–1992)

Personal information
- Nationality: German
- Born: 11 December 1903; Bayrischzell, German Empire
- Died: 30 December 1992 (aged 89); Bayrischzell, Germany

Sport
- Sport: Cross-country skiing

Hans Bauer (11 December 1903 – 30 December 1992) was a German cross-country skier. He competed in the men's 18 kilometre event at the 1928 Winter Olympics.
