= Jaakko Friman =

Finnish speed skater

Medal record

Men's speed skating

Representing Finland

Olympic Games
Bronze medal – third place	1928 St. Moritz	500 metres

Jaakko Johannes Friman (January 13, 1904 – February 17, 1987) was a former speed skater from Finland, who represented his native country at the 1928 Winter Olympics in St. Moritz, Switzerland. There, he won the bronze medal in the men's 500 metres. He was born and died in Tampere, Finland.
