= Gustaf Andersson (speed skater) =

Swedish speed skater

Gustaf Andersson (6 April 1903 – 15 September 1986), also known as Gustaf Gabeling, was a Swedish speed skater who competed in the 1928 Winter Olympics.

In 1928 he finished ninth in the 1500 metres event as well as ninth in the 5000 metres competition, and 23rd in the 500 metres event. He also started in the abandoned 10000 metres competition.
