= Karl Neuner =

German Nordic combined skier

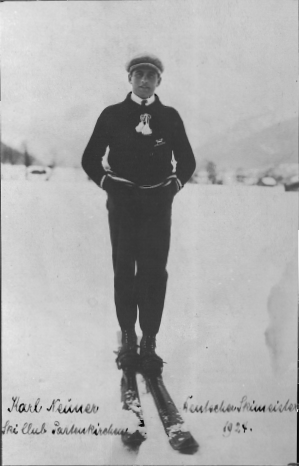
- Karl Neuner in 1924

Personal information
- Nationality: German
- Born: 16 January 1902; Garmisch-Partenkirchen, German Empire
- Died: 20 March 1949 (aged 47); Garmisch-Partenkirchen, Allied-occupied Germany

Sport
- Sport: Nordic combined

Karl Neuner (16 January 1902 – 20 March 1949) was a German skier. He competed in the Nordic combined event at the 1928 Winter Olympics.
