= Charles Thaon =

French speed skater (1910–2000)

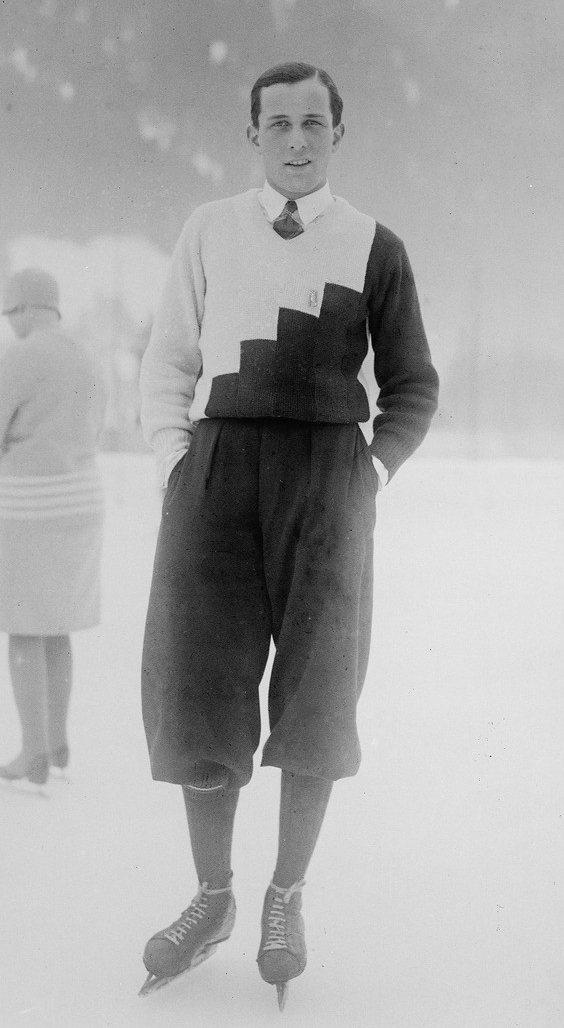
- Thaon in 1929

Personal information
- Nationality: French
- Born: 3 September 1910 Nice, France
- Died: 12 February 2000 (aged 89) Boulogne-Billancourt, France

Sport
- Sport: Speed skating

Achievements and titles
- Personal best(s): 500 m – 46.8 (1929); 1500 m – 2:44.2 (1928); 5000 m – 10:09.0 (1927)

Charles Francis Thaon (3 September 1910 – 12 February 2000) was a French speed skater. He competed in the 500 m, 1500 m and 5000 m events at the 1928 Winter Olympics and placed 26th–30th. After the Olympics he served as Secretary General of the French Federation of Ice Sports.
