= Wim Kos =

Dutch speed skater

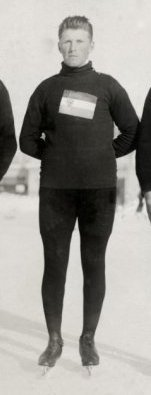
- Wim Kos in 1929

Personal information
- Nationality: Dutch
- Born: 8 February 1904; Oudkarspel, Netherlands
- Died: 8 March 1930 (aged 26); Oudkarspel, Netherlands

Sport
- Sport: Speed skating

Wim Kos (8 February 1904 – 8 March 1930) was a Dutch speed skater. He competed in three events at the 1928 Winter Olympics.
