= Leonard Stewart =

British speed skater (1907–1995)

Len Stewart
Personal information
- Full name: Leonard Stewart
- Nationality: British
- Born: 19 September 1907 Islington, England
- Died: 2 November 1995 (aged 88) Los Angeles, California, United States

Sport
- Sport: Speed skating

Leonard Stewart (19 September 1907 – 2 November 1995) was a British speed skater. He competed in three events at the 1928 Winter Olympics.
