= Ross Robinson (speed skater) =

Canadian speed skater

Personal information
- Born: 6 December 1906 Toronto, Ontario, Canada
- Died: 22 December 1992 (aged 86) Brampton, Ontario, Canada

Sport
- Sport: Speed skating

Ross Robinson (6 December 1906 – 22 December 1992) was a Canadian speed skater. He competed in three events at the 1928 Winter Olympics. He competed in the 500 metres, 1,500 metres and 5,000 metres.
