= Fritz Moser =

Austrian speed skater and rower

Personal information
- Nationality: Austrian
- Born: 11 February 1901
- Died: 10 September 1978 (aged 77)

Sport
- Sport: Rowing, speed skating

Fritz Moser (11 February 1901 – 10 September 1978) was an Austrian speed skater and rower. He competed in three speed skating events at the 1928 Winter Olympics. He also competed in the men's double sculls event at the 1936 Summer Olympics.

== See also ==
- List of athletes who competed in both the Summer and Winter Olympic games
