= Hans Schmid (ice hockey) =

German ice hockey player

- Born: December 28, 1898
- Played for: SC Riessersee
- National team: Germany
- Playing career: 1924–1938

Hans Heinrich Schmid (born December 28, 1898) is a former German ice hockey player. Schmid played on the Germany men's national ice hockey team at the 1928 Winter Olympics.
