= Oskar Olsen =

Norwegian speed skater

Medal record

Representing Norway

Men's speed skating

Olympic Games
Silver medal – second place	1924 Chamonix	500 m

Oskar Viktor Olsen (17 October 1897 – 28 December 1956) was a Norwegian speed skater and Olympic medalist. He received a silver medal at the 1924 Winter Olympics in Chamonix. He also competed at the 1928 Winter Olympics.

Records
Preceded by First medal	Athlete with the most medals at Winter Olympics; 26 January 1924 – 26 January 1924; With: Charles Jewtraw; Roald Larsen; Clas Thunberg	Succeeded by (Finland) Clas Thunberg and (Norway) Roald Larsen
