= Fritz Jungblut =

German speed skater

Personal information
- Nationality: German
- Born: 19 August 1907; Munich, German Empire
- Died: 25 September 1976 (aged 69); Linz, Austria

Sport
- Sport: Speed skating

Fritz Jungblut (19 August 1907 – 25 September 1976) was a German speed skater. He competed in three events at the 1928 Winter Olympics.
