= Rudolf Riedl =

Austrian speed skater

Personal information
- Nationality: Austrian
- Born: 7 June 1907
- Died: 4 December 1994 (aged 87)

Sport
- Sport: Speed skating

Rudolf Riedl (7 June 1907 – 4 December 1994) was an Austrian speed skater. He competed in four events at the 1928 Winter Olympics.
