= Arthur Vollstedt =

German speed skater (1892–1969)

Personal information
- Nationality: German
- Born: 21 January 1892; Hamburg, German Empire
- Died: 15 November 1969 (aged 77); Cologne, West Germany

Sport
- Sport: Speed skating

Arthur Vollstedt (21 January 1892 – 15 November 1969) was a German speed skater. He competed in two events at the 1928 Winter Olympics.
