= John Farrell (speed skater) =

American speed skater (1906–1994)

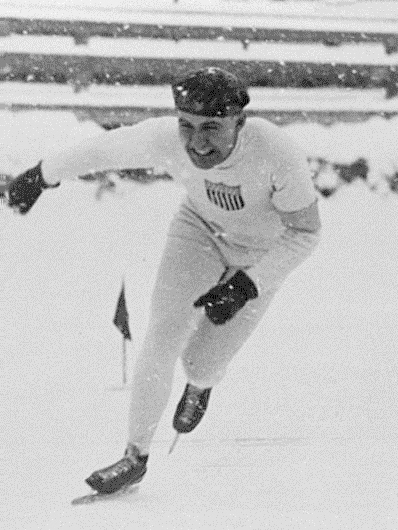
- John O'Neil Farrell at the 1928 Olympics

Personal information
- Born: August 28, 1906 Hammond, Indiana, United States
- Died: June 20, 1994 (aged 87) Evergreen Park, Illinois, United States
- Height: 1.80 m (5 ft 11 in)
- Weight: 78 kg (172 lb)

Sport
- Sport: Speed skating

Achievements and titles
- Personal bests: 500 m – 43.6 (1928); 1500 m – 2:26.8 (1928); 5000 m – 9:21.8 (1928); 10000 m – 20:00.9 (1932)
Medal record
Representing United States
Winter Olympics
Bronze medal – third place	1928 St. Moritz	500 m

John O'Neil Farrell (August 28, 1906 – June 20, 1994) was an American speed skater and speed skating coach.

Farrell participated in the 1928 Winter Olympics in St. Moritz. On the 500 m, he skated in the first pair and promptly set a new Olympic record with a time of 43.6 seconds, breaking Charles Jewtraw's old record of 44.0 seconds. The record would not stand, though, because in the next pair, Clas Thunberg skated 43.4 seconds, and in the eighth pair, Bernt Evensen also skated 43.4. But since nobody else besides those two skated faster than 43.6, Farrell won the bronze medal.

At the 1932 Winter Olympics of Lake Placid, the speed skating events were skated in pack-style format (having all competitors skate at the same time) for the only time in Olympic history. Farrell qualified for the final in his heat, but finished in sixth (and last) place in the final. Two weeks later, he finished fourteenth at the 1932 World Allround Championships, also in Lake Placid. At the 1936 Winter Olympics of Garmisch-Partenkirchen, Farrell was the head coach of the American speed skating team.

Farrell was a National Outdoor Champion. In 1971 he was inducted in the National Speedskating Hall of Fame.
