= Roald Larsen =

Norwegian speed skater

Personal information
- Born: 1 February 1898
- Died: 28 July 1959 (aged 61)

Sport
- Country: Norway
- Sport: Speed skating
- Retired: 1928
Medal record
Men's speed skating
Representing Norway
Olympic Games
Silver medal – second place	1924 Chamonix	1500 m
Silver medal – second place	1924 Chamonix	Allround
Bronze medal – third place	1924 Chamonix	500 m
Bronze medal – third place	1924 Chamonix	5000 m
Bronze medal – third place	1924 Chamonix	10000 m
Bronze medal – third place	1928 St.Moritz	500 m
World Championships
Gold medal – first place	1924 Helsinki	Allround
Silver medal – second place	1922 Kristiania	Allround
Silver medal – second place	1926 Trondheim	Allround
Bronze medal – third place	1925 Oslo	Allround
European Championships
Gold medal – first place	1924 Kristiania	Allround
Silver medal – second place	1925 St. Moritz	Allround
Bronze medal – third place	1923 Hamar	Allround
Bronze medal – third place	1928 Oslo	Allround
Bronze medal – third place	1929 Davos	Allround

Roald Morel Larsen (1 February 1898 – 28 July 1959) was a World Champion speed skater from Norway. He was born in Kristiania (now Oslo). Roald Larsen's parents were Hans Jacob Larsen, a glazier born in Kristiania in 1870, and Lydia Larsen, born in Porsgrunn in 1865. They had four children, all sons: Jaan Harald (1891), Lyder Ragnar (1895), Roald Morel (1898), and Gelgjermo Stone (1899).

Representing Kristiania Skøiteklub (now Oslo Skøiteklub), Larsen had his best year in 1924, when he became World Allround, European Allround, and Norwegian Allround Champion, in addition to winning two silver and three bronze medals at the 1924 Winter Olympics of Chamonix. One of those Olympic silver medals was on the allround event, a combination of the results of the 500 m, the 1500 m, the 5000 m, and the 10000 m – the only time in Olympic history that there was an allround event. Larsen won several more medals in the years that followed, including another bronze medal at the 1928 Winter Olympics of St. Moritz.

Larsen often had to admit defeat to Clas Thunberg. This is illustrated by the fact that at none of the six events in which Larsen won an Olympic medal he managed to finish ahead of Thunberg. After 1928, Larsen's appearances and successes quickly became less, although he kept competing occasionally until 1936.

After retiring from speed skating, Larsen followed in his father's footsteps and became a full-time glazier. He founded the glazier company Roald Larsen AS in Oslo in 1937. Larsen died in 1959, at the age of 62. As of 2018, Roald Larsen AS still exists, and is a full-service construction company.

== Medals ==
An overview of medals won by Larsen at important championships he participated in, listing the years in which he won each:

Championships	Gold medal	Silver medal	Bronze medal
Winter Olympics	–	1924 (1500 m); 1924 (Allround)	1924 (500 m); 1924 (5000 m); 1924 (10000 m); 1928 (500 m)
World Allround	1924	1922; 1926	1925
European Allround	1924	1925	1923; 1928; 1929
Norwegian Allround	1922; 1924	1921; 1923; 1925; 1927; 1928	1926

Source: SpeedSkatingStats.com & Skoyteforbundet.no

== Record ==
=== World records ===
Over the course of his career, Larsen skated one world record:

Distance	Time	Date	Location
500 m	43.1	4 February 1928	Eisstadion Davos, Davos

Source: ISU.org

=== Personal records ===
Personal records
Men's speed skating
Event	Result	Date	Location	Notes
500 m	43.1	4 February 1928	Eisstadion Davos, Davos	World record until beaten by Clas Thunberg on 19 January 1929.
1000 m	1:31.8	3 February 1929	Hamar stadion, Hamar	
1500 m	2:21.3	1 January 1928	Frogner stadion, Oslo	
3000 m	5:21.7	5 March 1935	Tønsberg	
5000 m	8:34.4	10 February 1924	Idrætspladsen (Skytterbanen), Kongsberg	
10000 m	17:40.3	17 February 1924	Frogner stadion, Kristiania	Oslo was called Kristiania before 1925.

Larsen's personal record on the 1000 m equalled Oscar Mathisen's 20-year-old world record on that distance.

Larsen has an Adelskalender score of 194.655 points. His highest ranking on the Adelskalender was a second place.

Records
Preceded by Himself with (United States) Charles Jewtraw, (Norway) Oskar Olsen and (Finland) Clas Thunberg	Athlete with the most medals at Winter Olympics; 26 January 1924 – 14 February 1928; With: Clas Thunberg	Succeeded by (Finland) Clas Thunberg
Preceded by First medal	Athlete with the most medals at Winter Olympics; 26 January 1924 – 26 January 1924; With: Charles Jewtraw; Oskar Olsen; Clas Thunberg	Succeeded by Himself and (Finland) Clas Thunberg
