= Toivo Ovaska =

Finnish speed skater (1899-1966)

Toivo Johannes Ovaska (18 December 1899 – 3 January 1966) was a Finnish speed skater who competed in the 1928 Winter Olympics.

He was born in Ruskeala, Karelia and died in Helsinki.

In 1928 he finished eleventh in the 500 metres event and 15th in the 1500 metres competition.

He also played football as a midfielder. He made four appearances for the Finland national team between 1926 and 1927.
