= Erhard Mayke =

German speed skater (1896–1962)

Erhard Mayke (6 January 1896 - 13 April 1962) was a German speed skater who competed at the 1928 Winter Olympics hosted in St moritz Switzerland. He also competed in the World Allround Speed Skating Championships for Men in the same year 1928 hosted in Davos. Career personal bests were: 500 – 48.4 (1928); 1500 – 2:37.6 (1928), 5000 – 9:20.0 (1928); 10000 – 19:01.6 (1928). Also having a second appearance at the Olympics 1936 in Germany where he was one of the timekeepers in speed skating. He died in West Prussia.

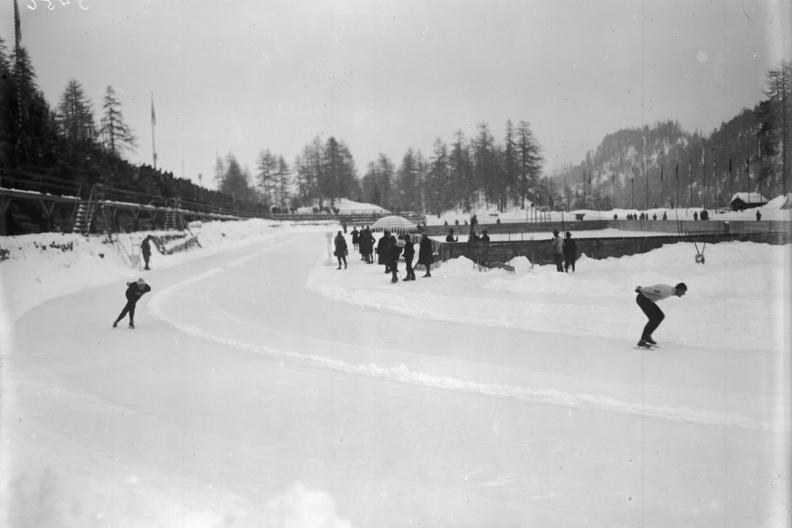
The 5000 metres race between Carlson and Mayke.

== Background and family ==
Following his birth in 1896 the family lived in a town called Konitz in Poland, they then moved to live in Berlin in 1900. Settling there for the long term, living in Schöneberg in Spichan Strasse. His Father studied garden design and started to work from Berlin it was preferential because of its more central location. Erhard was married twice. Though his long term wife was Luise Placke, from Osnabrück.

== During 1st and 2nd World War ==
He was a soldier of the cavalry in the Prussian army. He loved horses, wounded in 1916 when he was 20, during the 1st world war nearly losing his left arm. Always then having a hole in the left shoulder he worked after the war in a coffee roasting shop.

Professional sports card and he held the 1000 metre record in 1936 of 1 min and 43.6
