= Speed skating at the 1928 Winter Olympics =

Speed skating at the II Olympic Winter Games
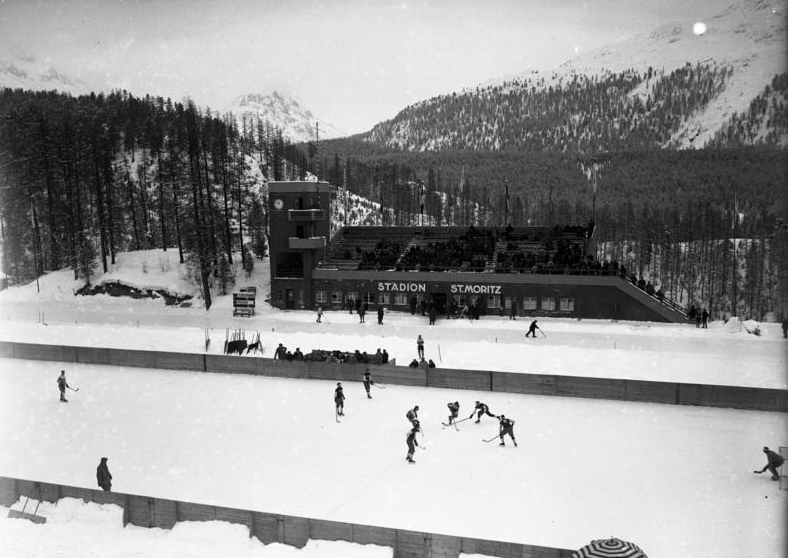
- The St. Moritz Olympic Ice Rink in 1928
- Venue: St. Moritz Olympic Ice Rink
- Date: 13–14 February 1928
- No. of events: 4
- Competitors: 40 from 14 nations

At the 1928 Winter Olympics in St. Moritz, four speed skating events were scheduled, all for men, but medals were only awarded for three events, because the 10.000 m event was not completed. The Allround event, which was only organized in 1924, was removed from the program. The competitions were held on Monday, 13 February 1928 and on Tuesday, 14 February 1928.

In the 10,000-meter race, Irving Jaffee was leading the competition, having outskated Norwegian defending world champion Bernt Evensen in their heat, when rising temperatures thawed the ice. In a controversial ruling, the Norwegian referee canceled the entire competition. Although the International Olympic Committee reversed the referee's decision and awarded Jaffee the gold medal, the International Skating Union later overruled the IOC and restored the ruling. Evensen, for his part, publicly said that Jaffee should be awarded the gold medal, but that never happened.

== Medal summary ==
Event	Gold		Silver		Bronze	
500 metres	Bernt Evensen; Norway	43.4	none awarded		John Farrell; United States	43.6
500 metres	Clas Thunberg; Finland	43.4	none awarded		Jaakko Friman; Finland	43.6
500 metres	Clas Thunberg; Finland	43.4	none awarded		Roald Larsen; Norway	43.6
1500 metres	Clas Thunberg; Finland	2:21.1	Bernt Evensen; Norway	2:21.9	Ivar Ballangrud; Norway	2:22.6
5000 metres	Ivar Ballangrud; Norway	8:50.5	Julius Skutnabb; Finland	8:59.1	Bernt Evensen; Norway	9:00.1
10,000 metres	The competition was cancelled in the fifth heat because of thawing ice					

== Participating nations ==
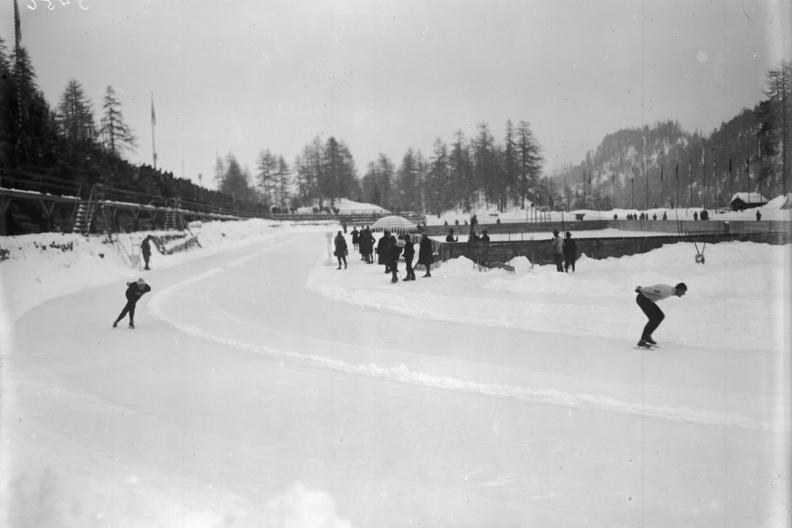
The 5000 metres race between Armand Carlsen (left) and Erhard Mayke (right).

A total of 40 speed skaters from 14 nations competed at the St. Moritz Games:

- Austria (3)
- Canada (3)
- Estonia (2)
- Finland (6)
- France (2)
- Germany (3)
- Great Britain (3)
- Hungary (1)
- Latvia (1)
- Lithuania (1)
- Netherlands (2)
- Norway (8)
- Sweden (1)
- United States (4)

== Medal table ==
Rank	Nation	Gold	Silver	Bronze	Total
1	Norway	2	1	3	6
2	Finland	2	1	1	4
3	United States	0	0	1	1
Totals (3 entries)		4	2	5	11
