= List of 1928 Winter Olympics medal winners =

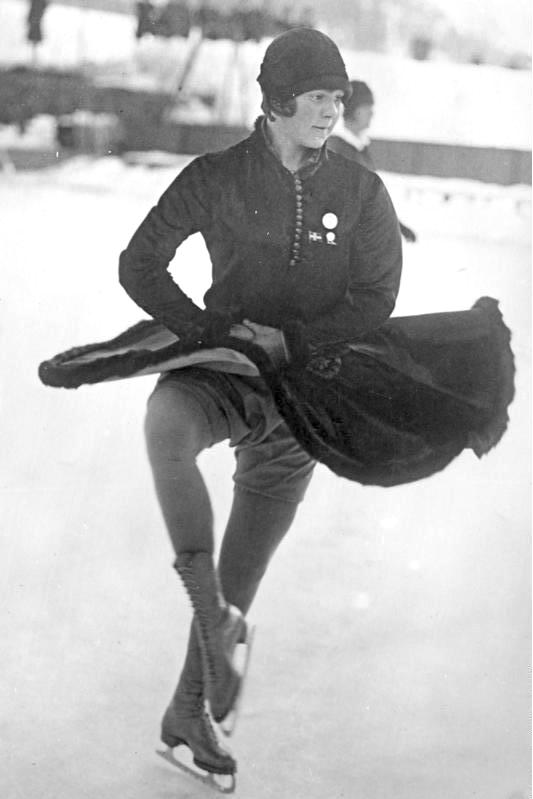
Norwegian figure skater Sonja Henie won the first of her three consecutive Olympic gold medals at the 1928 Games.

The 1928 Winter Olympics, referred to by the International Olympic Committee (IOC) as the II Olympic Winter Games, were held in St. Moritz, Switzerland, from February 11 through February 18, 1928. A total of 464 athletes from 25 National Olympic Committees (NOCs) participated in these Games. Overall, 14 events were contested in 8 disciplines. Athletes competed in skeleton for the first time, but unlike the previous Olympic Games there was no curling competition and military patrol was a demonstration event rather than a medal event. Both men and women competed in these Games, although women were only allowed to compete in the figure skating ladies' singles and pairs events.

Eighty-three individual athletes won medals, but the ones representing Norway far surpassed their competitors in the medal count, winning fifteen medals to the six won by the nearest NOC, the United States. The only three other NOCs that had medalists in more than one event were Sweden, Finland, and Austria. Twelve of the 25 participating NOCs secured at least one medal, and among these, six NOCs won at least one gold medal.

Sonja Henie of Norway won the gold medal in the women's individual figure skating competition, the first of three consecutive Winter Olympics where she would do so. She was only 15 years old when she competed at the 1928 Games, setting the record for the youngest person to win an Olympic medal, a record she held for 74 years. Competing with an injured knee, Swedish figure skater Gillis Grafström won the men's individual competition for the third consecutive Winter Games. In the 50–km cross-country skiing competition, Swedish athletes took all three medals. Per-Erik Hedlund won the race, which took place during unusual weather conditions (temperatures rose from 0 to 25 °C (32 to 77 °F)]), by a span of 13 minutes. Norwegian speed skater Bernt Evensen topped the medal count, winning one gold, one silver, and one bronze medal. Four athletes won two medals each: Johan Grøttumsbråten and Ivar Ballangrud of Norway, Clas Thunberg of Finland, and Jennison Heaton of the United States. Both Grøttumsbråten and Thunberg were multiple medal winners in the previous Olympic Games as well.

== Bobsleigh ==
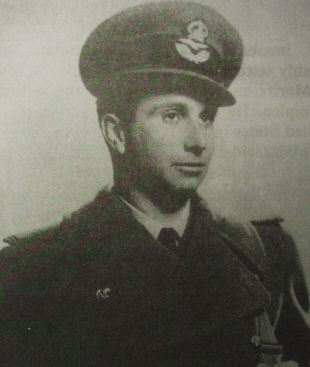
Billy Fiske, a member of the gold medal-winning American bobsled team in 1928, in a 1940 photo during his service in the Royal Air Force

Event	Gold	Silver	Bronze
Five-man	United States; USA II; Billy Fiske; Clifford Gray; Geoffrey Mason; Richard Parke; Nion Tucker	United States; USA I Thomas Doe; David Granger; Jennison Heaton; Lyman Hine; Jay O'Brien	Germany; Germany II; Hans Heß; Sebastian Huber; Hanns Kilian; Valentin Krempl; Hanns Nägle

== Cross-country skiing ==
Event	Gold	Silver	Bronze
18 km	Johan Grøttumsbråten; Norway	Ole Hegge; Norway	Reidar Ødegaard; Norway
50 km	Per-Erik Hedlund; Sweden	Gustaf Jonsson; Sweden	Volger Andersson; Sweden

== Figure skating ==
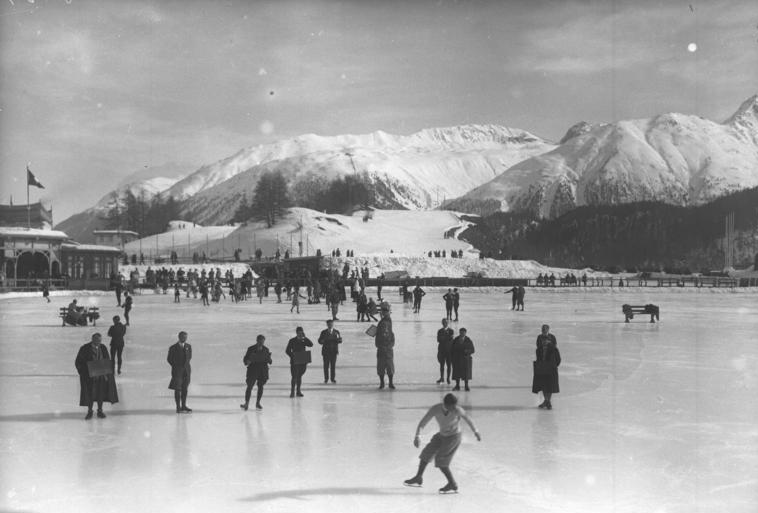
Swedish figure skater Gillis Grafström earned a gold medal in men's figure skating at the 1928 Winter Olympics, which was one of four Olympic Games in which he medaled.

Event	Gold	Silver	Bronze
Men's singles	Gillis Grafström; Sweden	Willy Böckl; Austria	Robert van Zeebroeck; Belgium
Ladies' singles	Sonja Henie; Norway	Fritzi Burger; Austria	Beatrix Loughran; United States
Pairs	France; Andrée Joly; Pierre Brunet	Austria; Lilly Scholz; Otto Kaiser	Austria; Melitta Brunner; Ludwig Wrede

== Ice hockey ==
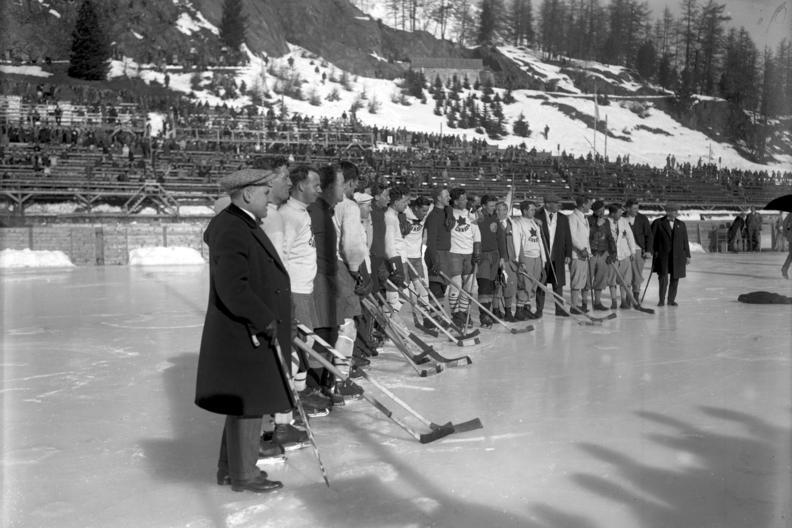
The Canadian and Swedish ice hockey teams stand together at the end of the ice hockey tournament final.

Event	Gold	Silver	Bronze
Men's team	Canada; Charles Delahaye; Frank Fisher; Louis Hudson; Norbert Mueller; Herbert Plaxton; Hugh Plaxton; Roger Plaxton; John Porter; Frank Sullivan; Joseph Sullivan; Ross Taylor; Dave Trottier	Sweden; Carl Abrahamsson; Emil Bergman; Birger Holmqvist; Gustaf Johansson; Henry Johansson; Nils Johansson; Ernst Karlberg; Erik Larsson; Bertil Linde; Sigfrid Öberg; Wilhelm Petersén; Kurt Sucksdorff	Switzerland; Giannin Andreossi; Mezzi Andreossi; Robert Breiter; Louis Dufour; Charles Fasel; Albert Geromini; Fritz Kraatz; Arnold Martignoni; Heini Meng; Anton Morosani; Luzius Rüedi; Richard Torriani

== Nordic combined ==
Event	Gold	Silver	Bronze
Men's individual	Johan Grøttumsbråten; Norway	Hans Vinjarengen; Norway	Jon Snersrud; Norway

== Skeleton ==
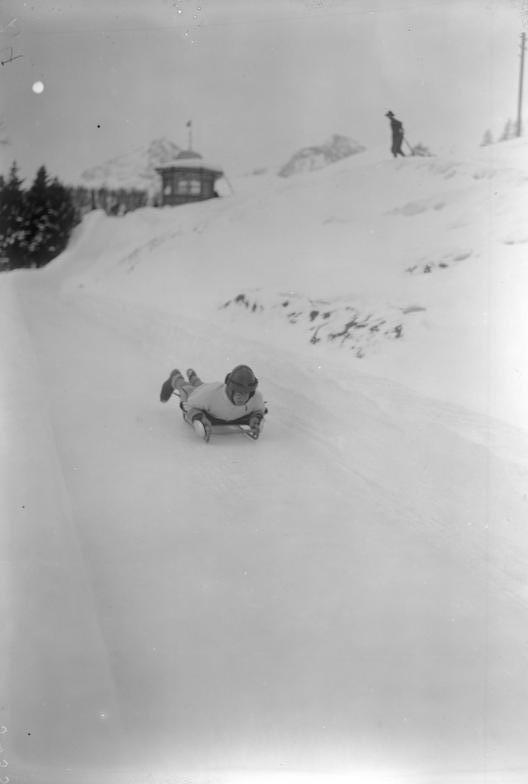
An unknown athlete competing in the skeleton competition at the 1928 Games

Event	Gold	Silver	Bronze
Men's individual	Jennison Heaton; United States	John Heaton; United States	David Carnegie; Great Britain

== Ski jumping ==
Event	Gold	Silver	Bronze
Men's individual	Alf Andersen; Norway	Sigmund Ruud; Norway	Rudolf Burkert; Czechoslovakia

== Speed skating ==
In the 10,000-meter race, Irving Jaffee was leading the competition, having outskated Norwegian defending world champion Bernt Evensen in their heat, when rising temperatures thawed the ice. In a controversial ruling, the Norwegian referee canceled the entire competition. Although the International Olympic Committee reversed the referee's decision and awarded Jaffee the gold medal, the International Skating Union later overruled the IOC and restored the ruling. Evensen, for his part, publicly said that Jaffee should be awarded the gold medal, but that never happened.

Event	Gold	Silver	Bronze
500 metres	Bernt Evensen; Norway Clas Thunberg; Finland	none awarded	John Farrell; United States Jaakko Friman; Finland Roald Larsen; Norway
1500 metres	Clas Thunberg; Finland	Bernt Evensen; Norway	Ivar Ballangrud; Norway
5000 metres	Ivar Ballangrud; Norway	Julius Skutnabb; Finland	Bernt Evensen; Norway
10000 metres	The competition was cancelled because of thawing ice.		

== Statistics ==
=== Medal leaders ===
Athletes who won multiple medals are listed below.

Athlete	Nation	Sport	Gold	Silver	Bronze	Total
Johan Grøttumsbråten	Norway	Cross-country skiing & Nordic combined	2	0	0	2
Clas Thunberg	Finland	Speed skating	2	0	0	2
Bernt Evensen	Norway	Speed skating	1	1	1	3
Jennison Heaton	United States	Skeleton & Bobsleigh	1	1	0	2
Ivar Ballangrud	Norway	Speed skating	1	0	1	2

== See also ==
- 1928 Winter Olympics medal table
