= Argentina at the 1928 Winter Olympics =

- IOC code: ARG
- NOC: Argentine Olympic Committee
- Website: www.coarg.org.ar (in Spanish)

in St. Moritz
- Competitors: 10 in 1 sport
- Medals: Gold 0 Silver 0 Bronze 0 Total 0

Winter Olympics appearances (overview)
- 1928; 1932–1936; 1948; 1952; 1956; 1960; 1964; 1968; 1972; 1976; 1980; 1984; 1988; 1992; 1994; 1998; 2002; 2006; 2010; 2014; 2018; 2022; 2026

Argentina competed at the Winter Olympic Games for the first time at the 1928 Winter Olympics in St. Moritz, Switzerland. The nation sent two bobsleigh teams, which finished in fourth and fifth place in the event. This participation is the best performance in the Winter Olympics of Argentina. The record also stood as the best performance by any Latin American nations until Brazil's Lucas Pinheiro Braathen won gold at the 2026 Winter Olympics.

== Bobsleigh ==
Sled	Team	Results			
Sled	Team	Run 1	Run 2	Total	Rank
Argentina 1	Eduardo Hope (captain); Jorge del Carril; Horacio Gramajo; Horacio Iglesias; Hector Milberg	1:40.1	1:42.5	3:22.6	4
Argentina 2	Arturo Gramajo (captain); Mariano Domari; Rafael Iglesias; Ricardo Gonzales Moreno; John Victor Nash	1:42.3	1:40.6	3:22.9	5
