= Romania at the 1928 Winter Olympics =

- IOC code: ROU
- NOC: Romanian Olympic and Sports Committee
- Website: www.cosr.ro (in Romanian, English, and French)

in St. Moritz
- Competitors: 10 (men) in 1 sport
- Medals: Gold 0 Silver 0 Bronze 0 Total 0

Winter Olympics appearances (overview)
- 1928; 1932; 1936; 1948; 1952; 1956; 1960; 1964; 1968; 1972; 1976; 1980; 1984; 1988; 1992; 1994; 1998; 2002; 2006; 2010; 2014; 2018; 2022; 2026

Romania competed at the 1928 Winter Olympics in St. Moritz, Switzerland.

== Bobsleigh ==
Sled	Athletes	Event	Run 1		Run 2		Total	
Sled	Athletes	Event	Time	Rank	Time	Rank	Time	Rank
ROM-1	Alexandru Berlescu; Eugen Ştefănescu; Petre Petrovici; Tita Rădulescu; Horia Roman	Five-man	1:47.3	21	1:44.9	13	3:32.2	19
ROM-2	Grigore Socolescu; Ion Gavăț; Traian Nițescu; Toma Ghițulescu; Mircea Socolescu	Five-man	1:43.8	13	1:40.8	4	3:24.6	7
