= United States at the 1928 Winter Olympics =

- Flag of the United States
- IOC code: USA
- NOC: United States Olympic Committee

in St. Moritz
- Competitors: 24 (21 men, 3 women) in 4 sports
- Flag bearer: Godfrey Dewey
- Medals Ranked 2nd: Gold 2 Silver 2 Bronze 2 Total 6

Winter Olympics appearances (overview)
- 1924; 1928; 1932; 1936; 1948; 1952; 1956; 1960; 1964; 1968; 1972; 1976; 1980; 1984; 1988; 1992; 1994; 1998; 2002; 2006; 2010; 2014; 2018; 2022; 2026

The United States competed at the 1928 Winter Olympics in St. Moritz, Switzerland.

== Medalists ==
The following U.S. competitors won medals at the games. In the by discipline sections below, medalists' names are bolded.

Medal	Name	Sport	Event	Date
Gold	Jennison Heaton	Skeleton	Men's	February 17
Gold	Billy Fiske; Clifford Grey; Geoffrey Mason; Richard Parke; Nion Tucker	Bobsleigh	Five-man	February 18
Silver	John Heaton	Skeleton	Men's	February 17
Silver	Thomas Doe; David Granger; Jennison Heaton; Lyman Hine; Jay O'Brien	Bobsleigh	Five-man	February 18
Bronze	John Farrell	Speed skating	500 meters	February 13
Bronze	Beatrix Loughran	Figure skating	Women's singles	February 18

Medals by sport
Sport	1st place, gold medalist(s)	2nd place, silver medalist(s)	3rd place, bronze medalist(s)	Total
Bobsleigh	1	1	0	**2**
Skeleton	1	1	0	**2**
Figure skating	0	0	1	**1**
Speed skating	0	0	1	**1**
Total	2	2	2	6

== Bobsleigh ==
Athlete	Event	Run 1		Run 2		Total	
Athlete	Event	Time	Rank	Time	Rank	Time	Rank
**Billy Fiske**; **Nion Tucker**; **Geoffrey Mason**; **Clifford Grey**; **Richard Parke**	Five-man	1:38.9	1	1:41.6	5	3:20.5	1st place, gold medalist(s)
**Jennison Heaton**; **David Granger**; **Lyman Hine**; **Jay O'Brien**; **Thomas Doe**	Five-man	1:42.3	8	1:38.7	1	3:21.0	2nd place, silver medalist(s)

== Cross-country skiing ==
Athlete	Event	Time	Rank
Anders Haugen	18 km	2:30:30	43
Rolf Monsen	18 km	2:48:00	45
Charles Proctor	18 km	2:35:00	44

== Figure skating ==
Individual

Athlete	Event	CF	FS	Total		
Athlete	Event	Rank	Rank	Places	Points	Final rank
Sherwin Badger	Men's singles	13	9	73	1324.00	11
Nathaniel Niles	Men's singles	16	13	103	1154.25	15
Roger Turner	Men's singles	9	12	67	1363.50	10
Theresa Blanchard	Ladies' singles	9	13	77	1970.25	10
**Beatrix Loughran**	Ladies' singles	4	4	28	2254.52	3rd place, bronze medalist(s)
Maribel Vinson	Ladies' singles	3	6	32	2224.50	4

Mixed

Athlete	Event	Points	Score	Rank
Theresa Blanchard; Nathaniel Niles	Pairs	79.5	69.00	9
Beatrix Loughran; Sherwin Badger	Pairs	43	87.50	4

== Nordic combined ==
The cross-country skiing part of this event was combined with the 18 km race of cross-country skiing. Those results can be found above in this article in the cross-country skiing section. Some athletes (but not all) entered in both the cross-country skiing and Nordic combined event, their time on the 18 km was used for both events. One would expect that athletes competing at the Nordic combined event, would participate in the cross-country skiing event as well, as they would have the opportunity to win more than one medal. This was not always the case due to the maximum number of athletes that could represent a country per event.

The ski jumping (normal hill) event was held separate from the main medal event of ski jumping, results can be found in the table below.

Athlete	Event	Cross-country		Ski Jumping			Total	
Athlete	Event	Time	Points	Distance 1	Distance 2	Points	Points	Rank
Anders Haugen	Individual	2:30:30	0.000	51.0	49.0	14.895	7.447	25
Rolf Monsen	Individual	DNF						
Charles Proctor	Individual	2:35:00	0.000	47.0	51.5	14.417	7.208	26

== Skeleton ==
Athlete	Event	Run 1		Run 2		Run 3		Total	
Athlete	Event	Time	Rank	Time	Rank	Time	Rank	Time	Rank
**Jack Heaton**	Men's	1:01.4	2	1:00.4	2	1:01.4	2	3:02.8	2nd place, silver medalist(s)
**Jennison Heaton**	Men's	1:00.2	1	1:00.2	1	1:01.0	1	3:01.8	1st place, gold medalist(s)

== Ski jumping ==
Athlete	Event	Jump 1	Jump 2	Total	
Athlete	Event	Distance	Distance	Points	Rank
Anders Haugen	Normal hill	51.0	53.0	15.291	18
Rolf Monsen	Normal hill	53.0	59.5	16.687	6
Charles Proctor	Normal hill	49.0	56.0	15.583	14

== Speed skating ==
In the 10,000-meter speed skating race, Irving Jaffee was leading the competition, having outskated Norwegian defending world champion Bernt Evensen in their heat, when rising temperatures thawed the ice. In a controversial ruling, the Norwegian referee canceled the entire competition. Although the International Olympic Committee reversed the referee's decision and awarded Jaffee the gold medal, the International Skating Union later overruled the IOC and restored the ruling. Evensen, for his part, publicly said that Jaffee should be awarded the gold medal, but that never happened.

Athlete	Event	Time	Rank
Valentine Bialas	500 m	46.5	17
**John Farrell**	500 m	43.6	3rd place, bronze medalist(s)
Irving Jaffee	500 m	45.2	11
Eddie Murphy	500 m	44.9	10
Valentine Bialas	1500 m	2:26.3	6
John Farrell	1500 m	2:26.8	8
Irving Jaffee	1500 m	2:26.7	7
Eddie Murphy	1500 m	2:25.9	5
Valentine Bialas	5000 m	9:06.3	6
John Farrell	5000 m	9:29.2	17
Irving Jaffee	5000 m	9:01.3	4
Eddie Murphy	5000 m	9:19.5	14
