= Austria at the 1928 Winter Olympics =

- IOC code: AUT
- NOC: Austrian Olympic Committee
- Website: www.olympia.at (in German)

in St. Moritz
- Competitors: 39 (34 men, 5 women) in 8 sports
- Medals Ranked 7th: Gold 0 Silver 3 Bronze 1 Total 4

Winter Olympics appearances (overview)
- 1924; 1928; 1932; 1936; 1948; 1952; 1956; 1960; 1964; 1968; 1972; 1976; 1980; 1984; 1988; 1992; 1994; 1998; 2002; 2006; 2010; 2014; 2018; 2022; 2026

Austria competed at the 1928 Winter Olympics in St. Moritz, Switzerland.

== Medalists ==
Medal	Name	Sport	Event
Silver	Willy Böckl	Figure skating	Men's singles
Silver	Fritzi Burger	Figure skating	Women's singles
Silver	Lilly Scholz; Otto Kaiser	Figure skating	Pairs
Bronze	Melitta Brunner; Ludwig Wrede	Figure skating	Pairs

== Bobsleigh ==
Sled	Athletes	Event	Run 1		Run 2		Total	
Sled	Athletes	Event	Time	Rank	Time	Rank	Time	Rank
AUT-1	Franz Lorenz; Franz Wohlgemuth; Eduard Pechanda; Benno Karner; Richard Lorenz	Five-man	1:44.2	14	DSQ	–	DSQ	–
AUT-2	Gustav Mader; Hugo Weinstengel; Michael Waissnix; Walter Sehr; Franz Pamperl	Five-man	1:52.3	23	1:49.7	22	3:42.0	22

== Cross-country skiing ==
Men

Event	Athlete	Race	
Event	Athlete	Time	Rank
18 km	Harald Paumgarten	1'51:43	17

== Figure skating ==
Men

Athlete	Event	CF	FS	Places	Points	Final rank
Ludwig Wrede	Men's singles	10	6	53	1368.75	8
Karl Schäfer	Men's singles	6	4	35	1463.75	4
Willy Böckl	Men's singles	2	2	13	1625.50	2nd place, silver medalist(s)

Women

Athlete	Event	CF	FS	Places	Points	Final rank
Grete Kubitschek	Women's singles	15	17	110	1778.50	17
Ilse Hornung	Women's singles	10	7	54	2050.75	8
Melitta Brunner	Women's singles	7	9	48	2087.50	7
Fritzi Burger	Women's singles	6	2	25	2248.50	2nd place, silver medalist(s)

Pairs

Athletes	Points	Score	Final rank
Melitta Brunner; Ludwig Wrede	29	93.25	3rd place, bronze medalist(s)
Lilly Scholz; Otto Kaiser	17	99.25	2nd place, silver medalist(s)

== Ice hockey ==
=== Group C ===
The top team (highlighted) advanced to the medal round.

Team	GP	W	L	T	GF	GA
Switzerland	2	1	0	1	5	4
Austria	2	0	0	2	4	4
Germany	2	0	1	1	0	1

February 11	Switzerland	4:4 (2:4,1:0,1:0)	Austria
February 11	Austria	0:0 -	Germany

—	Austria
	Herbert Brück; Walter Brück; Jacques Dietrichstein; Hans Ertl; Josef Göbl; Hans Kail; Herbert Klang; Ulrich Lederer; Walter Sell; Reginald Spevak; Hans Tatzer; Harry Weiß

== Nordic combined ==
Events:

- 18 km cross-country skiing
- normal hill ski jumping

The cross-country skiing part of this event was combined with the main medal event of cross-country skiing. Those results can be found above in this article in the cross-country skiing section. Some athletes (but not all) entered in both the cross-country skiing and Nordic combined event, their time on the 18 km was used for both events. One would expect that athletes competing at the Nordic combined event, would participate in the cross-country skiing event as well, as they would have the opportunity to win more than one medal. This was not always the case due to the maximum number of athletes that could represent a country per event.

The ski jumping (normal hill) event was held separate from the main medal event of ski jumping, results can be found in the table below.

Athlete	Event	Cross-country			Ski Jumping				Total	
Athlete	Event	Time	Points	Rank	Distance 1	Distance 2	Total points	Rank	Points	Rank
Harald Paumgarten	Individual	1'51:43	12.750	10	38.5	38.0	10.958	24	11.854	17

== Skeleton ==
Athlete	Run 1		Run 2		Run 3		Total	
Athlete	Time	Rank	Time	Rank	Time	Rank	Time	Rank
Louis Hasenknopf	1:15.4	9	1:10.9	8	1:10.4	8	3:36.7	8
Franz Unterlechner	1:05.9	8	1:03.4	5	1:04.2	5	3:13.5	6

== Ski jumping ==
Athlete	Event	Jump 1 (Dist.)	Jump 2 (Dist.)	Total	
Athlete	Event	Jump 1 (Dist.)	Jump 2 (Dist.)	Points	Rank
Harald Bosio	Normal hill	36.5	52.0	12.062	29

== Speed skating ==
Men

Event	Athlete	Race	
Event	Athlete	Time	Rank
500 m	Rudolf Riedl	49.1	24
500 m	Otto Polacsek	47.5	21
500 m	Fritz Moser	46.7	18
1500 m	Rudolf Riedl	2:37.8	22
1500 m	Fritz Moser	2:31.4	16
5000 m	Fritz Moser	9:57.8	27
5000 m	Rudolf Riedl	9:53.5	26
5000 m	Otto Polacsek	9:08.9	8
