= Netherlands at the 1928 Winter Olympics =

- Flag of the Netherlands
- IOC code: NED
- NOC: Dutch Olympic Committee

in St. Moritz
- Competitors: 7 in 2 sports
- Flag bearer: Edwin Teixeira de Mattos (bobsleigh)
- Medals: Gold 0 Silver 0 Bronze 0 Total 0

Winter Olympics appearances (overview)
- 1928; 1932; 1936; 1948; 1952; 1956; 1960; 1964; 1968; 1972; 1976; 1980; 1984; 1988; 1992; 1994; 1998; 2002; 2006; 2010; 2014; 2018; 2022; 2026

Athletes from the Netherlands competed at the Winter Olympic Games for the first time at the 1928 Winter Olympics in St. Moritz, Switzerland.

== Bobsleigh ==
Men

Event	Athlete	Run 1		Run 2		Total	
Event	Athlete	Time	Rank	Time	Rank	Time	Rank
Four/Five-man	Henri Louis Dekking; Jacques Paul Delprat; Hubert Menten; Curt van de Sandt; Edwin Louis Teixeira de Mattos	1:43.5	11	1:45.5	14	3:29.0	12

Initially Albert Levy Themans was selected to be part of the team. Due to a heavy strike at his factory, Levy Themans had to withdraw at the last moment. He was replaced by Edwin Teixeira de Mattos.

== Speed skating ==
Men

Event	Athlete	Race	
Event	Athlete	Time	Rank
500 m	Siem Heiden	49.9	27
500 m	Wim Kos	56.2	33
1500 m	Siem Heiden	2:33.1	18
1500 m	Wim Kos	2:49.9	29
5000 m	Siem Heiden	9:10.0	11
5000 m	Wim Kos	9:34.2	19
