= Poland at the 1928 Winter Olympics =

- IOC code: POL
- NOC: Polish Olympic Committee
- Website: www.pkol.pl (in Polish)

in St. Moritz
- Competitors: 26 (men) in 5 sports
- Flag bearer: Andrzej Krzeptowski
- Medals: Gold 0 Silver 0 Bronze 0 Total 0

Winter Olympics appearances (overview)
- 1924; 1928; 1932; 1936; 1948; 1952; 1956; 1960; 1964; 1968; 1972; 1976; 1980; 1984; 1988; 1992; 1994; 1998; 2002; 2006; 2010; 2014; 2018; 2022; 2026

Poland competed at the 1928 Winter Olympics in St. Moritz, Switzerland.

== Bobsleigh ==
Sled	Athletes	Event	Run 1		Run 2		Total	
Sled	Athletes	Event	Time	Rank	Time	Rank	Time	Rank
POL	Józef Broel-Plater; Jerzy Bardziński; Jerzy Łucki; Jerzy Potulicki-Skórzewski; Antoni Bura	Five-man	1:44.8	15	1:46.8	18	3:31.6	17

== Cross-country skiing ==
Men

Event	Athlete	Race	
Event	Athlete	Time	Rank
18 km	Andrzej Krzeptowski	1'59:02	25
18 km	Zdzisław Motyka	1'58:10	23
18 km	Józef Bujak	1'54:38	18
50 km	Stanisław Wilczyński	DNF	–
50 km	Franciszek Kawa	6'11:08	27
50 km	Józef Bujak	5'44:19	19
50 km	Andrzej Krzeptowski	5'36:55	13

== Ice hockey ==
=== Group B ===
The top team (highlighted) advanced to the medal round.

Team	GP	W	L	T	GF	GA
Sweden	2	1	0	1	5	2
Czechoslovakia	2	1	1	0	3	5
Poland	2	0	1	1	4	5

February 12	Sweden	2:2 (1:0,1:2,0:0)	Poland
February 13	Czechoslovakia	3:2 (1:1,1:1,1:0)	Poland

—	Poland
	Tadeusz Adamowski; Edmund Czaplicki; Aleksander Kowalski; Włodzimierz Krygier; Lucjan Kulej; Stanisław Pastecki; Aleksander Słuczanowski; Józef Stogowski; Karol Szenajch; Aleksander Tupalski; Kazimierz Żebrowski

== Nordic combined ==
Events:

- 18 km cross-country skiing
- normal hill ski jumping

The cross-country skiing part of this event was combined with the main medal event of cross-country skiing. Those results can be found above in this article in the cross-country skiing section. Some athletes (but not all) entered in both the cross-country skiing and Nordic combined event, their time on the 18 km was used for both events. One would expect that athletes competing at the Nordic combined event, would participate in the cross-country skiing event as well, as they would have the opportunity to win more than one medal. This was not always the case due to the maximum number of athletes that could represent a country per event.

The ski jumping (normal hill) event was held separate from the main medal event of ski jumping, results can be found in the table below.

Athlete	Event	Cross-country			Ski Jumping				Total	
Athlete	Event	Time	Points	Rank	Distance 1	Distance 2	Total points	Rank	Points	Rank
Aleksander Rozmus	Individual	2'12:26	2.375	24	49.0	56.5	15.187	10	8.781	22
Stanisław Motyka	Individual	2'08:31	4.250	21	38.5	37.5	10.812	25	7.531	24
Bronisław Czech	Individual	1'48:58	14.125	6	51.0 (fall)	60.5	11.166	23	12.645	10

== Ski jumping ==
Athlete	Event	Jump 1 (Dist.)	Jump 2 (Dist.)	Total	
Athlete	Event	Jump 1 (Dist.)	Jump 2 (Dist.)	Points	Rank
Aleksander Rozmus	Normal hill	41.0	53.0	13.166	25
Stanisław Gąsienica Sieczka	Normal hill	41.0	58.0	13.917	23
Andrzej Krzeptowski	Normal hill	41.5	46.5	12.604	27
Bronisław Czech	Normal hill	56.5	62.5 (fall)	6.333	37
