= Bobsleigh at the 1928 Winter Olympics =

Bobsleigh at the II Olympic Winter Games
- Venue: St.Moritz, Switzerland
- Dates: 18 February 1928
- Competitors: 115 from 14 nations

At the 1928 Winter Olympics, only one bobsleigh event was contested, the five man event. The competition was held on Saturday, 18 February 1928.

== Medalists ==
Gold	Silver	Bronze
United States; USA II; Billy Fiske; Clifford Gray; Geoffrey Mason; Richard Parke; Nion Tucker	United States; USA I Thomas Doe; David Granger; Jennison Heaton; Lyman Hine; Jay O'Brien	Germany; Germany II; Hans Heß; Sebastian Huber; Hanns Kilian; Valentin Krempl; Hanns Nägle

== Results ==
Place	Team	Bobsledders	Run 1	Run 2	Total
1	USA II (USA)	Billy Fiske, Nion Tucker, Geoffrey Mason, Clifford Gray, and Richard Parke	1:38.9	1:41.6	3:20.5
2	USA I (USA)	Jennison Heaton, David Granger, Lyman Hine, Jay O'Brien, and Thomas Doe	1:42.3	1:38.7	3:21.0
3	Germany II (GER)	Hanns Kilian, Hans Heß, Sebastian Huber, Valentin Krempl, and Hanns Nägle	1:41.7	1:40.2	3:21.9
4	Argentina I (ARG)	Arturo Gramajo, Ricardo González, Mariano de María, Rafael Iglesias, and John Victor Nash	1:40.1	1:42.5	3:22.6
5	Argentina II (ARG)	Eduardo Hope, Jorge del Carril, Héctor Milberg, Horacio Iglesias, and Horacio Gramajo	1:42.3	1:40.6	3:22.9
6	Belgium I (BEL)	Ernest Casimir-Lambert, Walter Jean Ganshof van der Meersch, Marcel Sedille-Courbon, Max Houben, and Léon Tom	1:39.8	1:44.7	3:24.5
7	Romania II (ROU)	Grigore Socolescu, Ion Gavăț, Traian Nițescu, Toma Ghițulescu, and Mircea Socolescu	1:43.8	1:40.8	3:24.6
8	Suisse I (SUI)	Charles Stoffel, René Fonjallaz, Henry Höhnes, Emil Coppetti, and Louis Koch	1:43.1	1:42.6	3:25.7
9	Great Britain II (GBR)	Henry Martineau, Walter Birch, John Dalrymple, John Gee, and Edward Hall	1:41.7	1:44.5	3:26.2
10	Great Britain I (GBR)	George Pim, Guy Tracey, David Griffith, Frederick Browning, and Thomas Warner	1:40.6	1:45.7	3:26.3
11	Mexico (MEX)	Lorenzo Elizaga, Juan de Landa, Genaro Díaz Raigosa, Mario Casasos, and José de la Cruz Porfirio Genaro Díaz Raigosa	1:44.9	1:42.8	3:27.6
12	The Netherlands (NED)	Curt van de Sandt, Jacques Delprat, Edwin Teixeira de Mattos, Henri Dekking, and Hubert Menten	1:43.5	1:45.5	3:29.0
13	Suisse II (SUI)	Jean Moillen, John Schneiter, René Ansermoz, André Moillen, and William Pichard	1:41.7	1:48.2	3:29.9
14	France I (FRA)	Jean de Suarez d'Aulan, Michel Baur, Roger Petit-Didier, Jacques Petit-Didier, and William Beamish	1:43.7	1:46.3	3:30.0
15	France II (FRA)	André Dubonnet, Bertrand du Pontavice de Heussey, Joseph Dedeyn, Stéphane de la Rochefoucault, and Jacques Rheins	1:45.7	1:44.5	3:30.2
16	Belgium II (BEL)	Charles Mulder, Hubert Kryn, Ferdinand Hubert, Louis Rooy, and Robert Langlois	1:45.0	1:46.2	3:31.2
17	Poland (POL)	Józef Broel-Plater, Jerzy Bardziński, Jerzy Łucki, Jerzy Potulicki-Skórzewski, and Antoni Bura	1:44.8	1:46.8	3:31.6
18	Germany I (GER)	Hans-Edgar Endres, Paul Martin, Karl Reinhardt, Paul Volkhardt, and Rudolf Soenning	1:48.0	1:43.9	3:31.9
19	Romania I (ROU)	Alexandru Berlescu, Eugen Ştefănescu, Petre Petrovici, Tita Rădulescu, and Horia Roman	1:47.3	1:44.9	3:32.2
20	Luxembourg (LUX)	Marc Schoetter, Raoul Weckbecker, Willy Heldenstein, Pierre Kaempff, and Auguste Hilbert	1:45.8	1:46.9	3:32.7
21	Italia (ITA)	Giancarlo Morpugo, Carlo Sem, Luigi Cerutti, Giuseppe Crivelli, and Piero Marchetti	1:45.0	1:49.6	3:34.6
22	Austria II (AUT)	Franz Lorenz, Franz Wohlgemuth, Eduard Pechanda, Benno Karner, and Richard Lorenz	1:52.3	1:49.7	3:42.0
—	Austria I (AUT)	Gustav Mader, Hugo Weinstengel, Michael Waissnix, Walter Sehr, and Franz Pamperl	1:44.2	DSQ	DSQ

== Participating nations ==
A total of 115 bobsledders from 14 nations competed at the St. Moritz Games:

- Austria (10)
- Argentina (10)
- Belgium (10)
- France (10)
- Germany (10)
- Great Britain (10)
- Italy (5)
- Luxembourg (5)
- Mexico (5)
- Netherlands (5)
- Poland (5)
- Romania (10)
- Switzerland (10)
- United States (10)

== Medal table ==
Rank	Nation	Gold	Silver	Bronze	Total
1	United States	1	1	0	2
2	Germany	0	0	1	1
Totals (2 entries)		1	1	1	3
