= 1928 Winter Olympics medal table =

1928 Winter Olympics medals
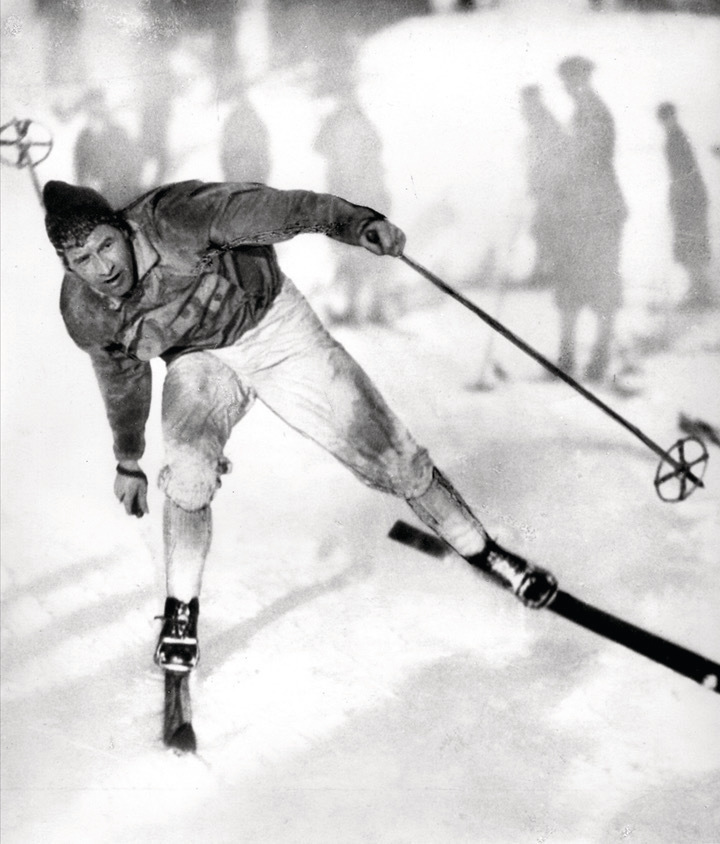
- Johan Grøttumsbråten tied for most gold medals won at the 1928 Winter Olympics, winning two in the individual Nordic combined and ski jumping events.
- Location: St. Moritz, Switzerland

Highlights
- Most gold medals: Norway (6)
- Most total medals: Norway (15)
- Medalling NOCs: 12

1928 Winter Olympic Games medal map Legend: Gold represents countries that won at least one gold medal Silver represents countries that won at least one silver medal Bronze represents countries that won at least one bronze medal Red represents countries that did not win any medals Grey represents countries that did not participate

The 1928 Winter Olympics, officially known as the II Olympic Winter Games and commonly known as St. Moritz 1928, were an international multi-sport event held in St. Moritz, Switzerland, from 11 to 19 February 1928. A total of 464 athletes representing 25 National Olympic Committees (NOCs) participated, which included 9 NOCs more than the inaugural Winter Games held four years earlier in Chamonix, France. The 9 NOCs were all first time entrants at the Winter Games: Argentina, Estonia, Germany, Japan, Lithuania, Luxembourg, Mexico, the Netherlands, and Romania. The games featured 14 events in 4 sports in 8 disciplines, with skeleton making its debut appearance. These games were the first Winter Games to be held as a stand-alone event, not in conjunction with a Summer Olympics. It also replaced the Nordic Games, a former international multi-sport event that also focused primarily on winter sports.

Overall, athletes representing 12 NOCs won at least one medal, and 6 NOCs won at least one gold medal. Norway won the most gold medals and the most overall medals, with 6 and 15 respectively. France's team won their first Winter Olympic gold medal, with figure skaters Andrée Joly and Pierre Brunet winning gold in the pair skating event. Germany's and Czechoslovakia's teams obtained their first Winter Olympic medals, with the former winning bronze in the five-man bobsleigh event from bobsledders Hans Heß, Sebastian Huber, Hanns Kilian, Valentin Krempl, and Hanns Nägle, and the latter also winning bronze but in the men's individual ski jumping event from Rudolf Burkert.

Skier Johan Grøttumsbraaten of Norway and speed skater Clas Thunberg of Finland tied for the most gold medals won by an individual at the games, with two each. Speed skater Bernt Evensen of Norway won the most overall medals for an individual at the games, winning three medals with one gold, one silver, and one bronze.

Sweden and Norway achieved podium sweeps at the games, with the latter achieving two. The former swept the men's 50 kilometre event in cross-country skiing with Per-Erik Hedlund winning the gold, Gustaf Jonsson winning the silver, and Volger Andersson winning the bronze. The latter swept the men's 18 kilometre event in cross-country skiing with Grøttumsbråten winning the gold, Ole Hegge winning the silver, and Reidar Ødegaard winning the bronze, and the individual Nordic combined event with Grøttumsbråten again winning the gold, Hans Vinjarengen winning the silver, and Jon Snersrud winning the bronze.

== Medals ==
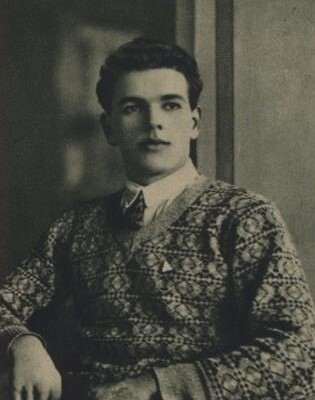
Rudolf Burkert won the first Winter Olympic medal for Czechoslovakia, winning bronze in the men's individual ski jumping event.

The medals used for the 1928 Winter Olympics were minted by Huguenin Frères in Le Locle and were designed by Arnold Hünerwadel. The obverse of the medals featured a design of a female figure skater surrounded with snowflakes. The reverse of the medals featured the Olympic rings, the official name of the games and the host city in French, and an olive branch on the left- and right-hand sides.

== Medal table ==
The medal table is based on information provided by the International Olympic Committee (IOC) and is consistent with IOC conventional sorting in its published medal tables. The table uses the Olympic medal table sorting method. By default, the table is ordered by the number of gold medals the athletes from a nation have won, where a nation is an entity represented by a NOC. The number of silver medals is taken into consideration next and then the number of bronze medals. If teams are still tied, equal ranking is given and they are listed alphabetically by their IOC country code.

In speed skating, two gold medals and three bronze medals with no silver medal were awarded in the men's 500 metres event after a tie for first place and a three-way tie for third place. The men's 10,000 metres event resulted in having no medals being awarded after the finals were cancelled by a referee due to thawing ice. Irving Jaffee of the United States was briefly credited as the champion of the event by the IOC but the decision was overruled by the International Skating Union (ISU) and the ruling that there would be no medalists was restored. The United States NOC submitted a protest to the decision by the ISU but it was rejected as they had submitted it too late.

* Host nation (Switzerland)

1928 Winter Olympics medal table
Rank	Nation	Gold	Silver	Bronze	Total
1	Norway	6	4	5	15
2	United States	2	2	2	6
3	Sweden	2	2	1	5
4	Finland	2	1	1	4
5	Canada	1	0	0	1
5	France	1	0	0	1
7	Austria	0	3	1	4
8	Belgium	0	0	1	1
8	Czechoslovakia	0	0	1	1
8	Germany	0	0	1	1
8	Great Britain	0	0	1	1
8	Switzerland*	0	0	1	1
Totals (12 entries)		14	12	15	41
