= Toma Ghițulescu =

Romanian politician and bobsledder

Toma Petre Ghițulescu
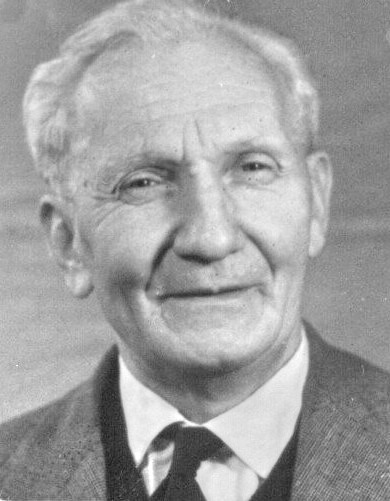
- Toma Petre Ghițulescu in 1964

Secretary of State at the Ministry of Economy (Romania)
- In office 5 April 1941 – 26 May 1941

Personal details
- Born: 29 June 1902 Giurgiu, Kingdom of Romania
- Died: 26 October 1983 (aged 81) Bucharest, Socialist Republic of Romania
- Education: Politehnica University of Bucharest
- Occupation: Engineer, geologist, bobsledder
- Known for: His posthumous rehabilitation for crimes against peace

Toma Petre Ghițulescu (29 June 1902 – 26 October 1983) was a Romanian engineer, politician, and Olympic bobsledder. He is known for being an officially-rehabilitated member of the Axis-aligned World War II-era Government of Marshal Ion Antonescu.

Born in Giurgiu, he graduated în 1925 from the Department of Mining of the Bucharest Polytechnic Institute. He was then hired as an engineer in the prospecting section of the Geological Institute of Romania, where he carried out pioneering work in geophysical prospecting. Together with Ion Gavăț, he was the author of the first Romanian gravimetric prospecting work, executed in 1928 on a salt massif near Călinești. In 1927, Mircea Socolescu and Sabba S. Ștefănescu joined their team; together, they performed gravimetric measurements, magnetometric research, and electrometric investigations through vertical electrical surveys.

Ghițulescu competed in the four-man event at the 1928 Winter Olympics, together with Grigore Socolescu, Ion Gavăț, Traian Nițescu, and Mircea Socolescu.

From 5 April to 26 May 1941, Ghițulescu served as Undersecretary of State at the Ministry of Economy in the Third Antonescu cabinet. In 1945, with the help of two policemen from Bucharest, he obtained false identities (with the names of Petre Gheorghe and Petre Ciobanu) and went into hiding. In October 1948 he came under investigation by the communist authorities. Following the Nuremberg Trials model, he was sentenced in 1949 in absentia to 5 years of prison for "crimes against peace" due to being part of the Antonescu administration. In 1950 Ghițulescu received 60,000 lei from Lt. Col. Serge Parisot, the French military attaché (believed to be in the employ of French intelligence), to facilitate his escape from Romania by crossing the border illegally. Ghițulescu was caught by the Securitate on 17 July 1950. Convicted by the Bucharest Military Tribunal, he was sentenced to forced labor for life on 20 October 1950, and was detained at Jilava Prison and at Aiud Prison. In 1956 he was sent under forced residence to Brad, where he worked at the gold mines in the area, as a specialist in the field. He was pardoned in February 1959 and died in Bucharest in 1983.

On 26 October 1998, Ghițulescu was rehabilitated by the Romanian Supreme Court. His acquittal was made possible by the briefness of his term as Undersecretary of State in the National Economy Ministry, as well as the fact that he resigned before 30 June 1941, the date of the Iași pogrom. His rehabilitation was part of a lot of 8 – all members of the wartime Antonescu Government – submitted to the Romanian Supreme Court by the Prosecutor General of Romania, Sorin Moisescu, on 22 October 1997. Romania backed down for the most part one month later, following the protests of two U.S. officials, Senator Alfonse D'Amato and Representative Christopher Smith. The country did hold on to Ghițulescu's rehabilitation, however, citing the timing and briefness of his tenure. Romania was threatened with the reassessment of Western support for its integration into EU and NATO should the eight be acquitted. In December 1998, four U.S. congressmen (Tom Lantos, Benjamin Gilman, John Edward Porter, and John Lewis) sent a letter of congratulations to President Emil Constantinescu for reversing the resolution to rehabilitate 7 members of Antonescu's government, but they also "strongly urged him to do the same in the eighth case". Whether the U.S. officials ever found out that this was no longer possible – Ghițulescu having already been rehabilitated on 26 October 1998 – is not known.

In 2012, Ghițulescu was made an honorary citizen of the city of Brad.
