= Gramajo =

Gramajo is a surname. Notable people with the surname include:

- Arturo Gramajo (1897–1957), Argentine bobsledder and food inventor
- César Augusto Blanco Gramajo (born 1959), Guatemalan chess player
- Eduardo Edilio Costa Gramajo (born 1977), Argentine judoka
- Héctor Gramajo (1940–2004), Guatemalan general
- Henry Gramajo (born 1970), Uruguayan equestrian
- Horacio Gramajo (1900–1943), Argentine bobsledder
- Roberto Gramajo (1947–2023), Argentine football forward

== See also ==
- Revuelto Gramajo, Argentine dish consisting of potatoes, ham, and eggs
