= France at the 1928 Winter Olympics =

- IOC code: FRA
- NOC: French Olympic Committee

in St. Moritz
- Competitors: 38 (36 men, 2 women) in 8 sports
- Medals Ranked 5th: Gold 1 Silver 0 Bronze 0 Total 1

Winter Olympics appearances (overview)
- 1924; 1928; 1932; 1936; 1948; 1952; 1956; 1960; 1964; 1968; 1972; 1976; 1980; 1984; 1988; 1992; 1994; 1998; 2002; 2006; 2010; 2014; 2018; 2022; 2026

France competed at the 1928 Winter Olympics in St. Moritz, Switzerland.

== Medalists ==
Medal	Name	Sport	Event
Gold	Andrée Joly; Pierre Brunet	Figure skating	Pairs

== Bobsleigh ==
Sled	Athletes	Event	Run 1		Run 2		Total	
Sled	Athletes	Event	Time	Rank	Time	Rank	Time	Rank
FRA-1	Jean de Suarez d'Aulan; Michel Baur; Roger Petit-Didier; Jacques Petit-Didier; William Beamish	Five-man	1:43.7	12	1:46.3	17	3:30.0	14
FRA-2	André Dubonnet; Bertrand du Pontavice de Heussey; Joseph Dedein; Stéphane de la Roucefoucault; Jacques Rheins	Five-man	1:45.7	19	1:44.5	10	3:30.2	15

== Cross-country skiing ==
Men

Event	Athlete	Race	
Event	Athlete	Time	Rank
18 km	Martial Payot	2'09:42	36
18 km	Maurice Mandrillon	2'04:39	33
18 km	Paul Simond	2'03:54	30
18 km	François Vallier	2'03:27	28
50 km	Jean Camille Tournier	DNF	–
50 km	Évariste Prat	DNF	–
50 km	Henri Millan	DNF	–
50 km	Camille Médy	DNF	–

== Figure skating ==
Men

Athlete	Event	CF	FS	Places	Points	Final rank
Pierre Brunet	Men's singles	7	7	50	1147.75	7

Women

Athlete	Event	CF	FS	Places	Points	Final rank
Anita de St. Quentin	Women's singles	20	20	140	1114.25	20
Andrée Joly	Women's singles	17	3	86	1910.00	11

Pairs

Athletes	Points	Score	Final rank
Andrée Joly; Pierre Brunet	14	100.50	1st place, gold medalist(s)

== Ice hockey ==
=== Group A ===
The top team (highlighted) advanced to the medal round.

Team	GP	W	L	GF	GA
Great Britain	3	2	1	10	6
France	3	2	1	6	5
Belgium	3	2	1	9	10
Hungary	3	0	3	2	6

February 11	France	2:0 (0:0,2:0,0:0)	Hungary
February 12	France	3:2 (0:1,3:1,0:0)	Great Britain
February 13	Belgium	3:1 (2:0,0:0,1:1)	France

—	France
	André Charlet; Raoul Couvert; Alfréd de Rauch; Albert Hassler; Jacques Lacarrière; Philippe Lefebvre; François Mautin; Calixte Payot; Philippe Payot; Léonhard Quaglia; Georges Robert; Gérard Simond

== Nordic combined ==
Events:

- 18 km cross-country skiing
- normal hill ski jumping

The cross-country skiing part of this event was combined with the main medal event of cross-country skiing. Those results can be found above in this article in the cross-country skiing section. Some athletes (but not all) entered in both the cross-country skiing and Nordic combined event, their time on the 18 km was used for both events. One would expect that athletes competing at the Nordic combined event, would participate in the cross-country skiing event as well, as they would have the opportunity to win more than one medal. This was not always the case due to the maximum number of athletes that could represent a country per event.

The ski jumping (normal hill) event was held separate from the main medal event of ski jumping, results can be found in the table below.

Athlete	Event	Cross-country			Ski Jumping				Total	
Athlete	Event	Time	Points	Rank	Distance 1	Distance 2	Total points	Rank	Points	Rank
Marcel Beraud	Individual	DNF	–	–	–	–	–	–	DNF	–
Kléber Balmat	Individual	2'16:40	0.250	25	47.0	55.5 (fall)	8.333	27	4.291	28
Martial Payot	Individual	2'09:42	3.750	23	38.0	46.5	12.042	22	7.896	23

== Skeleton ==
Athlete	Run 1		Run 2		Run 3		Total	
Athlete	Time	Rank	Time	Rank	Time	Rank	Time	Rank
Pierre Dormeuil	DNF	–	–	–	–	–	DNF	–

== Ski jumping ==
Athlete	Event	Jump 1 (Dist.)	Jump 2 (Dist.)	Total	
Athlete	Event	Jump 1 (Dist.)	Jump 2 (Dist.)	Points	Rank
Joseph Maffioli	Normal hill	35.0	40.0	8.125	35
Martial Payot	Normal hill	40.5	47.0	12.678	26
Kléber Balmat	Normal hill	47.0	54.0	13.833	24

== Speed skating ==
Men

Event	Athlete	Race	
Event	Athlete	Time	Rank
500 m	Charles Thaon	50.1	28
500 m	Léon Quaglia	49.5	26
1500 m	Charles Thaon	2:44.2	26
5000 m	Charles Thaon	10:18.8	30
5000 m	Léon Quaglia	9:33.3	18
