= Figure skating at the 1928 Winter Olympics – Ladies' singles =

Figure skating at the Olympics

Ladies' singles at the II Olympic Winter Games
- Venue: St. Moritz Olympic Ice Rink
- Dates: 16-18 February 1928
- Competitors: 20 from 8 nations

Medalists
1st place, gold medalist(s)		Sonja Henie; Norway
2nd place, silver medalist(s)		Fritzi Burger; Austria
3rd place, bronze medalist(s)		Beatrix Loughran; United States

The ladies' individual skating event was held as part of the figure skating at the 1928 Winter Olympics. It was the fourth appearance of the event, which had previously been held at the Summer Olympics in 1908 and 1920 and was also part of the first Winter Games in 1924. The competition was held from Thursday, 16 February to Saturday, 18 February 1928. Twenty figure skaters from eight nations competed.

== Results ==
Rank	Name	Nation	CF	FS	Total points	Places
1	Sonja Henie	Norway	1	1	2452.25	8
2	Fritzi Burger	Austria	6	2	2248.50	25
3	Beatrix Loughran	United States	4	4	2254.52	28
4	Maribel Vinson	United States	3	6	2224.50	32
5	Cecil Smith	Canada	2	8	2213.75	32
6	Constance Wilson-Samuel	Canada	5	5	2173.00	35
7	Melitta Brunner	Austria	7	9	2087.50	48
8	Ilse Hornung	Austria	10	7	2050.75	54
9	Ellen Brockhöft	Germany	8	10	2003.00	67
10	Theresa Blanchard	United States	9	13	1970.25	77
11	Andrée Joly	France	17	3	1910.00	86
12	Margrit Bernhardt	Germany	14	14	1890.00	91
13	Edel Randem	Norway	13	15	1880.75	94
14	Kathleen Shaw	Great Britain	11	19	1900.00	95
15	Else Flebbe	Germany	16	12	1833.50	103
16	Karen Simensen	Norway	12	18	1811.75	103
17	Grete Kubitschek	Austria	15	17	1778.50	110
18	Elaine Winter	Germany	18	11	1765.75	110
19	Elvira Barbey	Switzerland	19	16	1648.75	125
20	Anita de St. Quentin	France	20	20	1114.25	140

Referee:

- (Finland) Walter Jakobsson

Judges:

- (Norway) Oscar Kolderup
- (France) Francis Pigueron
- (United Kingdom) Thomas D. Richardson
- (Belgium) Fernand de Montigny
- (United States) Henry W. Howe
- (Germany) Otto Schöning
- (Austria) Walter Muller
