= Petit-Didier =

Petit-Didier is a French surname that may refer to

- Jacques Petit-Didier, French Olympic bobsledder
- Matthieu Petit-Didier (1659–1728), French theologian and historian
- Roger Petit-Didier, French Olympic bobsledder

== See also ==
- Petit (disambiguation)
- Didier
