= Skeleton at the 1928 Winter Olympics =

Skeleton at the II Olympic Winter Games
- Venue: Cresta Run
- Dates: 17 February 1928
- Competitors: 10 from 6 nations

Medalists
1st place, gold medalist(s)		Jennison Heaton	United States
2nd place, silver medalist(s)		John Heaton	United States
3rd place, bronze medalist(s)		David Carnegie	Great Britain

These are the results of the men's skeleton competition at the 1928 Winter Olympics in St. Moritz. At that time the sport was called cresta, and St. Moritz had the most famous Cresta Run, dating to 1884. In many locations the sport was referred to as tobogganing during these and the 1948 Games. The competition took place on the Cresta Run and medals were awarded after a total of three runs down the course.

== Medalists ==
Gold	Jennison Heaton; United States
Silver	John Heaton; United States
Bronze	David Carnegie; Great Britain

Jennison and John Heaton were brothers. The skeleton sled on which Jennison Heaton won the gold medal is currently on display in the Hotel Soldanella in St. Moritz. This skeleton was owned by and used by USAF Maj. Gen. Lawrence C. Ames from 1948 until 1977. His last ride was on his eightieth birthday. At that time he was the oldest man ever to have run the Cresta Run. Jack Heaton would also win the silver medal in 1948.

The bronze medalist, David Carnegie, was also Earl of Northesk.

== Results ==
Rank	Name	Run 1	Run 2	Run 3	Total	Diff.
1	Jennison Heaton (USA)	1:00.2	1:00.2	1:01.4	3:01.8	—
2	John Heaton (USA)	1:01.4	1:00.4	1:01.0	3:02.8	+1.0
3	David Carnegie (GBR)	1:02.7	1:01.0	1:01.4	3:05.1	+3.3
4	Agostino Lanfranchi (ITA)	1:02.1	1:02.4	1:04.2	3:08.7	+6.9
5	Alexander Berner (SUI)	1:03.4	1:03.4	1:02.0	3:08.8	+7.0
6	Franz Unterlechner (AUT)	1:05.9	1:03.4	1:04.2	3:13.5	+11.7
7	Alessandro del Torso (ITA)	1:05.6	1:04.7	1:04.6	3:14.9	+13.1
8	Louis Hasenknopf (AUT)	1:15.4	1:10.9	1:10.4	3:36.7	+34.9
9	W. Noneschen (SUI)	1:04.8	DNF	—	—	—
10	P. Dorneuil (FRA)	DNF	—	—	—	—

== Medal table ==
Rank	Nation	Gold	Silver	Bronze	Total
1	United States	1	1	0	2
2	Great Britain	0	0	1	1
Totals (2 entries)		1	1	1	3
