= Socolescu =

Socolescu is a Romanian surname. Notable people with the surname include:

- Grigore Socolescu (1905–?), Romanian bobsledder
- Mircea Socolescu, Romanian bobsledder
- Toma Barbu Socolescu, Romanian architect
- Toma T. Socolescu, Romanian architect
