= Walter Birch =

Walter Birch may refer to

- Walter de Gray Birch (1842–1924), English Historian
- Walter Birch (bobsleigh) (1898–1965), British bobsledder
- Walter Birch (footballer) (1917–1991), English footballer

== See also ==
- Walter Burch (1908–1985), American Negro league baseball player
