= Richard Park =

Richard Park may refer to:

- Richard Park (ice hockey) (born 1976), Korean-born American ice hockey player
- Richard Park (broadcaster) (born 1948), British media personality and businessman
- Richard Henry Park (1832–1902), American sculptor

== See also ==
- Richard Parke (1893–1950), American bobsledder
- Richard Park Ward (born 1969), American guitarist
- Richard Parks (disambiguation)
