= Henri Dekking =

Dutch bobsledder (1892–1967)

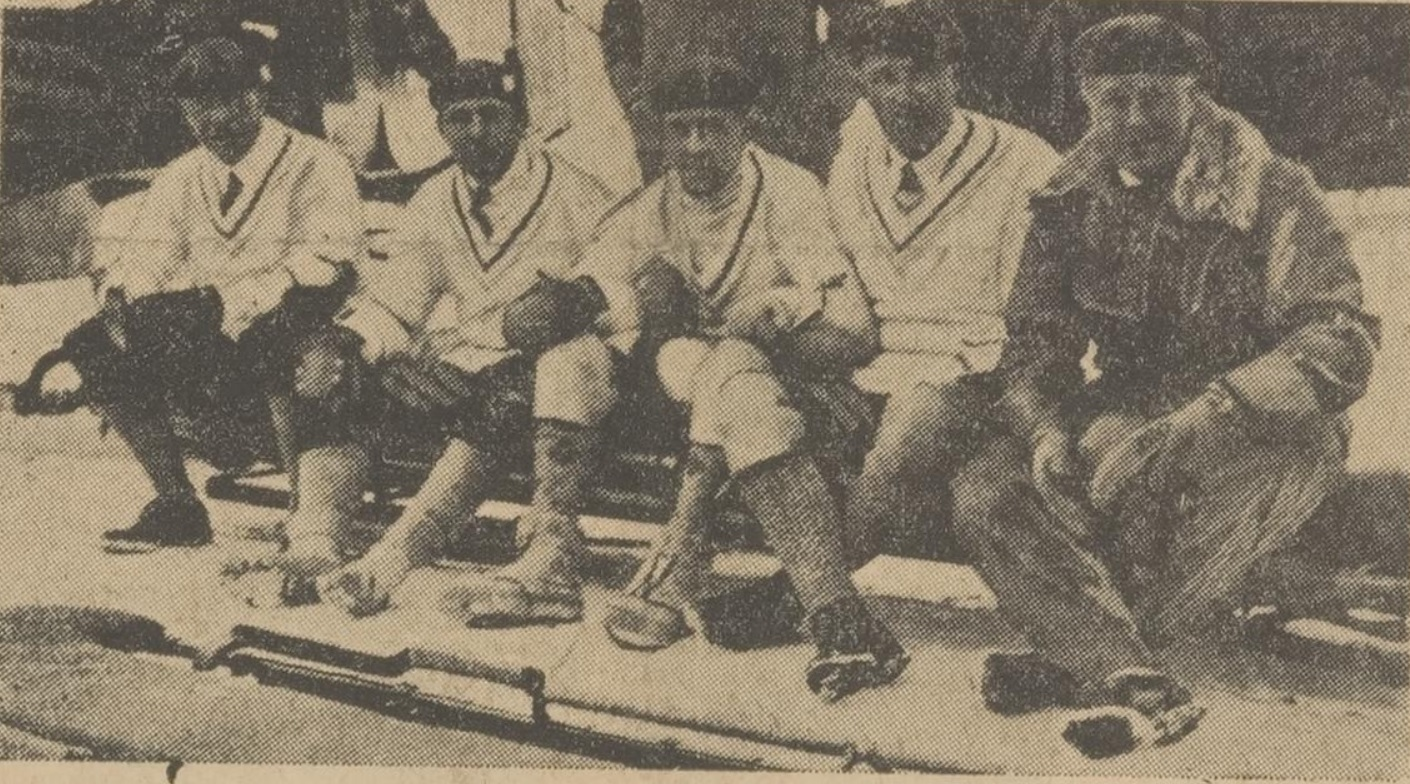
- Dekking (second right) at the 1928 Winter Olympics

Personal information
- Full name: Henri Louis Dekking
- Nationality: Dutch
- Born: 7 February 1892; Haarlem, Netherlands
- Died: May 1967 (aged 75); Ciudad de Mexico, Mexico

Sport
- Sport: Bobsleigh

Henri Louis Dekking (7 February 1892 – May 1967) was a Dutch bobsledder. He competed in the four-man event at the 1928 Winter Olympics.

== Biography ==
Born in Haarlem, Noord-Holland, Netherlands to Petrus Johannes Dekking and Christina Petronella van der Waarden and had two children.

Dekking started with bobsleigh just one winter before the 1928 Winter Olympics. In that time he did it for four consecutive months; seen at the time as a long period. At the 1928 Winter Olympics in Saint Moritz he was part of the first Dutch bobsleigh team in the four-man event (the Dutch didn't participate in 1924) together with Curt van de Sandt (captain), Hubert Menten, Edwin Louis Teixeira de Mattos and Jacques Delprat. The Dutch team finished 8th in the first run and finished 12th overall after the second run.
