= Hans Hess =

Hans Hess may refer to:

- Hans Hess (bobsleigh) (born 1902), participated at the 1928 Winter Olympics
- Hans Hess (Swiss politician) (born 1945), member of the Swiss Council of States since 1988
- Hans Hess (museologist) (1907–1975), curator of York Art Gallery
