= Richard Parkes =

Richard Parkes may refer to:

- Richard Parkes (clergyman) (born 1559), English clergyman
- Richard Parkes (piper) (born 1960), Northern Irish bagpipe player

== See also ==
- Richard Parkes Bonington (1802–1828), English Romantic landscape painter
- Richard Parke (1893–1950), American bobsledder
- Richard Parks (disambiguation)
- Richard Parker (disambiguation)
