= Rafael Iglesias =

Rafael Iglesias may refer to:

- Rafael Iglesias (bobsleigh), Argentine Olympic bobsledder
- Rafael Iglesias (boxer) (1924–1999), Argentine boxer and heavyweight gold medal winner at the 1948 Olympics
- Rafael Iglesias (athlete) (born 1979), Spanish long distance runner
- Rafael Iglesias (sailor) (1905-?), Argentine Olympian

== See also ==
- Rafael Yglesias (born 1954), US novelist
- Rafael Yglesias Castro (1861–1924), president of Costa Rica, 1894–1902
