= David Granger =

David Granger may refer to:

- David A. Granger (born 1945), President of Guyana
- David Granger (bobsleigh) (1903–2002), American, Olympic bobsledder
- David Granger (footballer) (1955–2024), Australian rules footballer
- David M. Granger, editor-in-chief of Esquire Magazine
