= Hubert Menten =

Dutch bobsledder

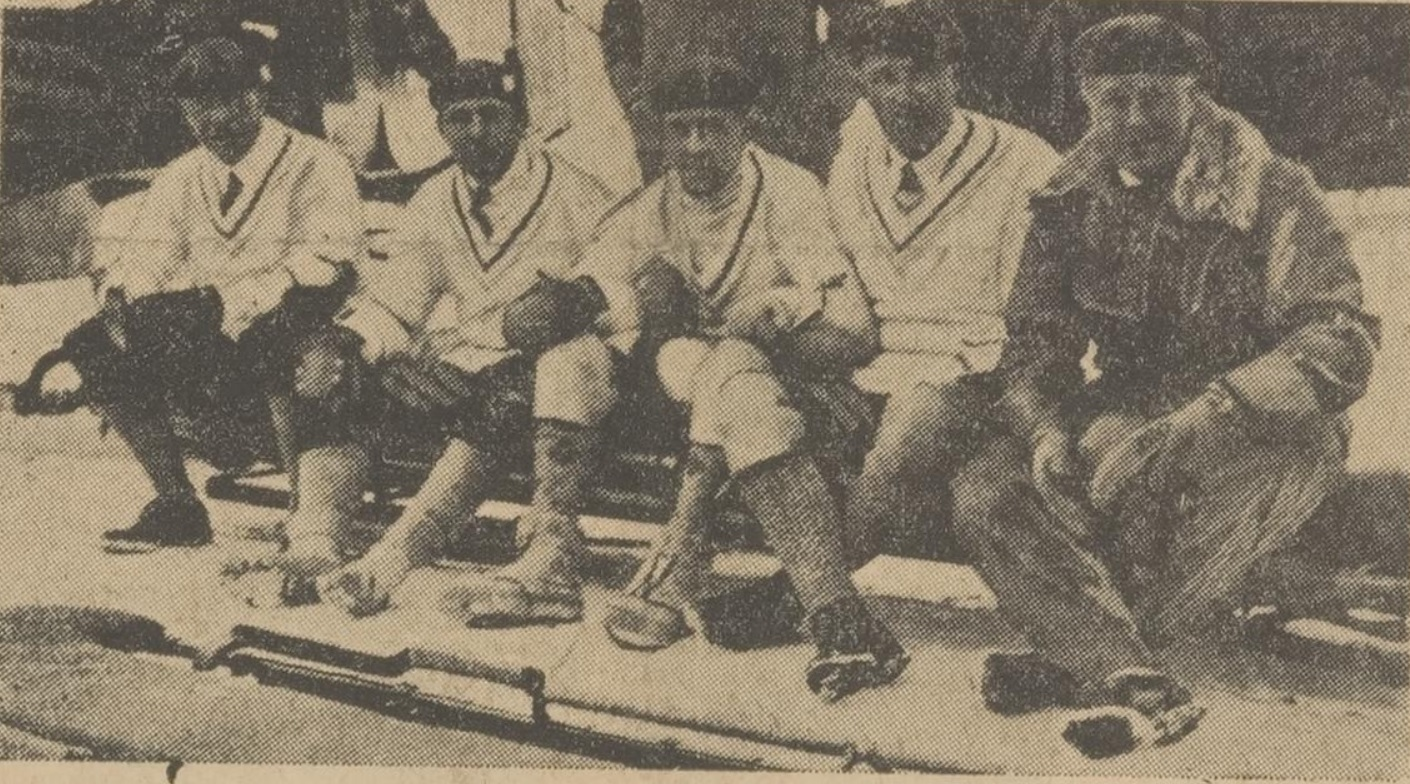
- Menten (right) at the 1928 Winter Olympics

Personal information
- Full name: Jacques Hubert Pierre François Menten
- Date of birth: 12 September 1873
- Place of birth: Muntok, Dutch East Indies
- Date of death: 8 May 1964 (aged 90)
- Place of death: Zurich, Switzerland
- Height: 1.75 m (5 ft 9 in)
- Position: Midfielder

Senior career*
Years	Team	Apps	(Gls)
1887–1894	Koninklijke HFC		

International career
1894	Netherlands unofficial team	2	(0)
- * Club domestic league appearances and goals

Hubert Menten (12 September 1873 – 8 May 1964) was a Dutch footballer who played as a midfielder for Koninklijke HFC and the Netherlands national team (unofficial) in the early 1890s. He later became a bobsledder, competing in the four-man event at the 1928 Winter Olympics.

== Footballing career ==
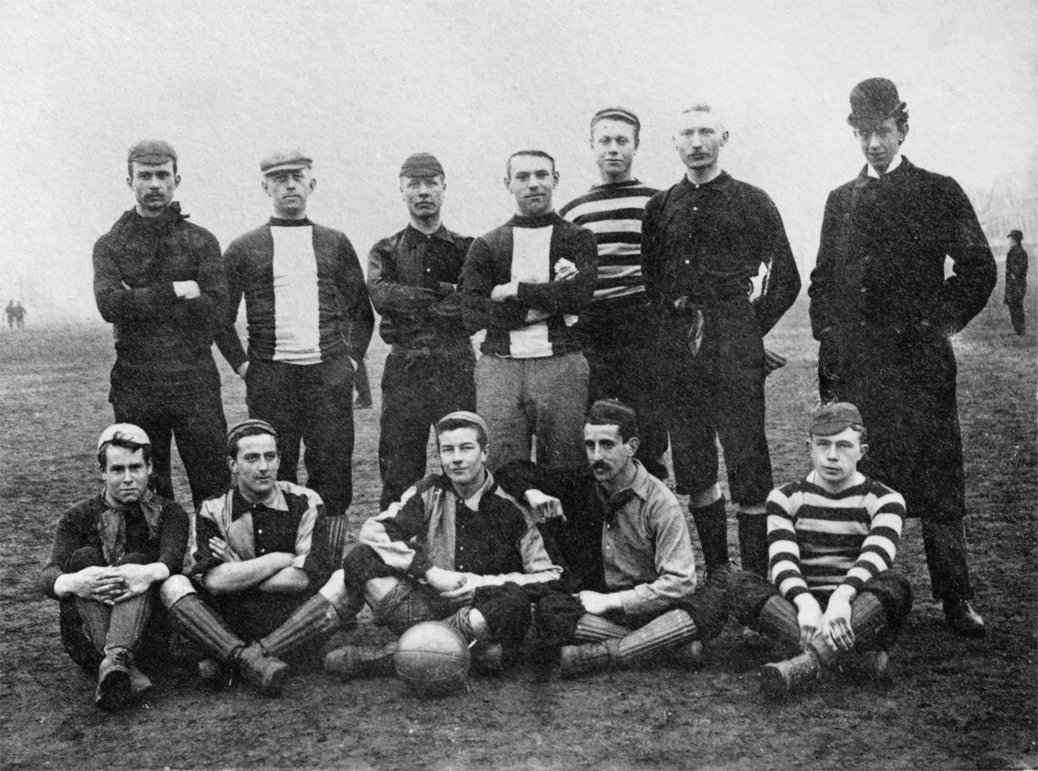
Menten (standing, fourth from left) with the unofficial Dutch national team in their first match against Felixstowe in 1894.

Hubert Menten was born on 12 September 1873 in the Dutch East Indies, in the Indonesian archipelago of Bangka-Belitung on the island of Sumatra.

Together with Pim Mulier, Jacob Willem Schorer, Johan Schröder, Solco Tromp, and Albertus Putman Cramer, Menten was a member of the Koninklijke HFC team that won the first ever cup match in the Netherlands on 11 February 1894, helping his side to a 3–1 win over Haarlem, as well as three Dutch championships in 1889–90, 1892–93, and 1894–95. He was one of the eleven footballers who started in the Netherlands' first-ever unofficial international match on 6 February 1894 against the English side Felixstowe United, which ended in a 0–1 loss, but such was the English supremacy at the time that this was still an incredible result. According to the chronicles of the match, Menten "almost scored, but was not sharp enough in the finish".

== Bobsledder career ==
Menten was part of the Netherlands delegation at the 1928 Summer Olympics, winning 51 prizes; of which 22 first prizes, 13 second prizes, and 16 third prizes. At the 1928 Winter Olympics in Saint Moritz, he was part of the first Dutch bobsleigh team in the four-man event (the Dutch didn't participate in 1924) together with Curt van de Sandt (captain), Henri Louis Dekking, Edwin Louis Teixeira de Mattos and Jacques Delprat. The Dutch team finished 8th in the first run and finished 12th overall after the second run.

== Honours ==
Koninklijke HFC

- Dutch Championship:
  - Champions (3): 1889–90, 1892–93, and 1894–95
