= Jacques Delprat =

Dutch bobsledder

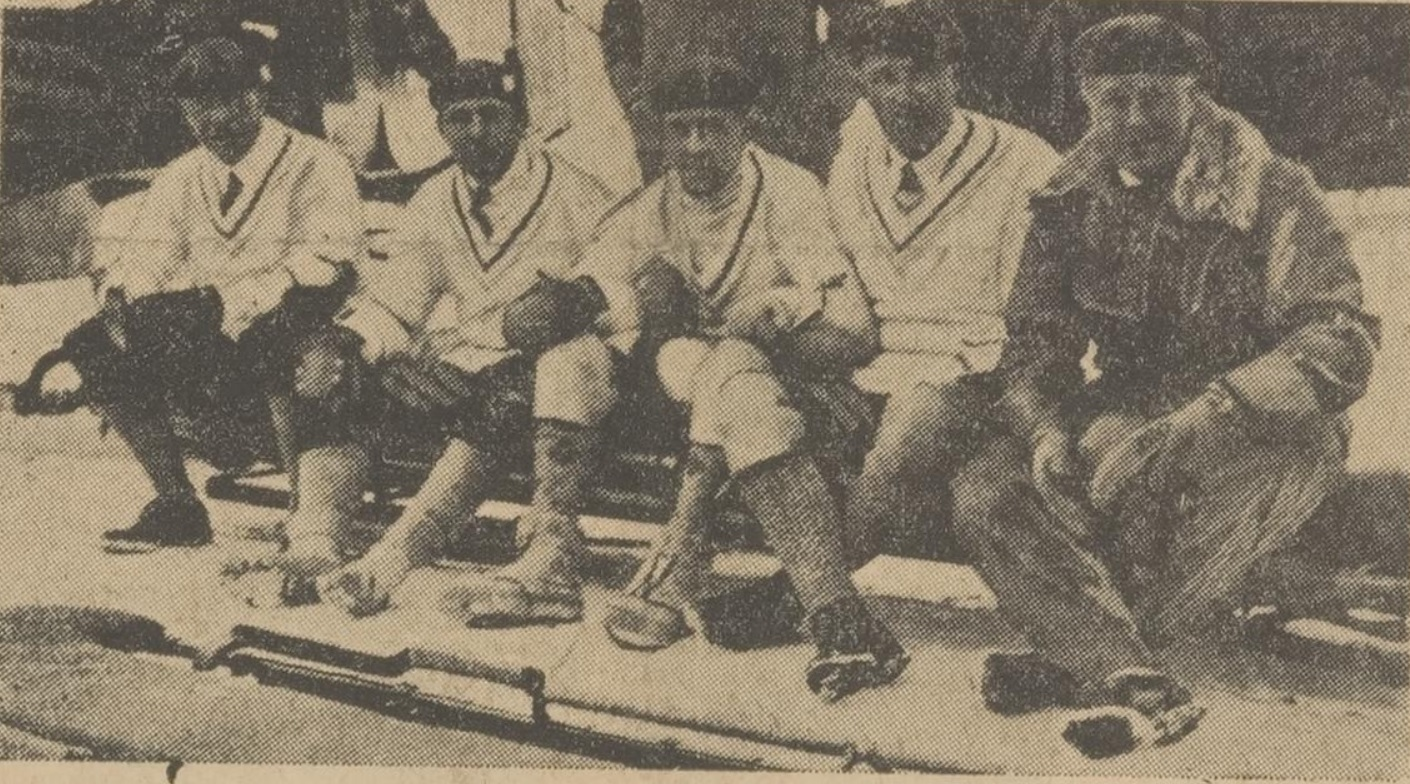
- Delprat (second left) at the 1928 Winter Olympics

Personal information
- Full name: Jacques Paul Delprat
- Nationality: Dutch
- Born: 17 December 1882; Bandung, Dutch East Indies
- Died: 17 February 1956 (aged 73); Utrecht or Hilversum, Netherlands
- Height: 190 cm (6 ft 3 in)
- Weight: 103 kg (227 lb)

Sport
- Sport: Bobsleigh

Jacques Paul Delprat (17 December 1882 – 17 February 1956) was a Dutch bobsledder. He competed in the four-man event at the 1928 Winter Olympics.

== Biography ==
=== Sports ===
When Delprat studied in the Netherlands he was a good rower, winning three times the university championship. Delprat started with bobsleigh in 1908. He competed at Schatzalp, Klosters and Arosa as a brakeman. He won many prizes. At the 1928 Winter Olympics he was part of the first Dutch bobsleigh team in the four-man event (the Dutch didn't participate in 1924) together with Curt van de Sandt (captain), Henri Louis Dekking, Edwin Louis Teixeira de Mattos and Hubert Menten. The heavy weight of 103 kg of Delprat, was seen as an advantage at the track of Saint Moritz. The Dutch team finished 8th in the first run and finished 12th overall after the second run.

=== Personal and career ===
Delprat was born in Bandung, Dutch East Indies in 1882. He had a brother. Delprat went to school in Amsterdam and later studied at the Technical University in Delft. He graduated as a mechanical engineer in 1908. Delprat moved to Scotland, working for a sugar production machinery manufacturer. He returned to Dutch East Indies where he worked as an engineer for companies in Semarang and Surabaya. In 1914 he started working for a lumber company. In 1917 he became director of the Vereenigde Javasche Houthandel Maatschappijen (translated: United Java Wood Trade Companies). At that time he lived in Semarang. He returned to the Netherlands and worked for institutions and companies supporting trade with South Africa. For his work he travelled a lot, visiting South Africa many times.

Delprat became Officer in the Order of Orange-Nassau.

Delprat was married to jonkvrouw Adrana Minette Casparine van Benthem van den Berg in 1910. Delprat died on 17 February 1956, aged 73. He was buried at Zorgvlied in Amsterdam-Zuid.
