= Emil Coppetti =

Swiss bobsledder

Personal information
- Nationality: Swiss
- Born: 1902 Zürich, Switzerland

Sport
- Sport: Bobsleigh

Emil Coppetti (born 1902, date of death unknown) was a Swiss bobsledder. He competed in the four-man event at the 1928 Winter Olympics.
