= Louis Koch =

Swiss bobsledder

Personal information
- Nationality: Swiss
- Born: 1903

Sport
- Sport: Bobsleigh

Louis Koch (born 1903, date of death unknown) was a Swiss bobsledder. He competed in the four-man event at the 1928 Winter Olympics.
