= Rudolf Soenning =

German bobsledder

Personal information
- Nationality: German
- Born: 5 December 1904; Memmingen, German Empire
- Died: 2 August 1980 (aged 75); Memmingen, West Germany

Sport
- Sport: Bobsleigh

Rudolf Soenning (5 December 1904 – 2 August 1980) was a German bobsledder. He competed in the four-man event at the 1928 Winter Olympics.
