= Richard Parks (disambiguation) =

Richard Parks (born 1977) is a Welsh rugby union player turned extreme endurance athlete and television presenter.

Richard Parks may also refer to:

- Rich Parks (1943–1978), American basketball player
- Richard Parks (author) (born 1955), American writer

== See also ==
- Richard Parkes (disambiguation)
- Richard Park (disambiguation)
