= Marcel Sedille-Courbon =

Belgian bobsledder

Personal information
- Nationality: Belgian
- Born: 1904 Brussels, Belgium

Sport
- Sport: Bobsleigh

Marcel Sedille-Courbon (born 28 January 1904, died 29 November 1990) was a Belgian bobsledder. He competed in the four-man event at the 1928 Winter Olympics.
