= List of Argentine dishes =

This is a list of dishes found in Argentine Cuisine.

== Dishes ==
=== Appetizers and starters ===
Name	Image	Region	Type	Description
Chipa		Northeast	snack	small, baked, cheese-flavored rolls made with yucca. The use of yucca to make bread and cakes is traditional to the Guaraní people.
Empanadas			bread or pastry	a stuffed bread or pastry baked or fried with fillings differing from province to province; in some, it is mainly chicken; in others, beef (cubed or ground depending on the region) is used, perhaps spiced with cumin and paprika; others include onion, boiled egg, olives, or raisins.
Deviled eggs Huevos rellenos			appetizer	hard-boiled eggs, shelled, cut in half and filled with the hard-boiled egg's yolk mixed with other ingredients such as mayonnaise and mustard
Picada			appetizer	an ensemble of several appetizers (although sometimes it is eaten as a main meal), including various cheeses, cured meats and sausages (such as ham, salame and leberwurst), olives in brine, pickled vegetables, nuts, potato chips, etc.
Choripán			sandwich	a sandwich made with chorizo or sausage between two halves of a small French loaf. It is sometimes topped with chimichurri sauce.
Sándwich de miga			sandwich	a sandwich made with thinly sliced bread with no crust, the part of the bread called miga. It is filled with thin cold cuts, hard-boiled eggs, cheese, tomatoes, and various other ingredients.

=== Main dishes ===
Name	Image	Region	Type	Description
Asado		Pampas	meat dish	a range of barbecue techniques usually consisting of beef alongside various other meats, which are cooked on a grill, or open fire. It is considered a national dish.
Churrasco		Pampas	meat dish	any cut of beef that is sliced slightly thin as a steak and grilled over hot coals or on a very hot skillet.
Humita		Northwest	main or side vegetable dish	prepared with fresh corn, sautéed onions and some spices, depending on the region or taste. The dough is wrapped in corn husks and boiled.
Locro		Northwest	stew	a stew of squash, meat, and hominy
Matambre		Pampas	roulade	a roulade of flank steak and vegetables usually cut in thick slices and served cold.
Milanesas			meat dish	a thin, breaded and deep fried or baked slice of beef, chicken, or sometimes pork, and even eggplants or soy.
Pascualina			savoury pie	a spinach and/or chard pie originally from Italy, very similar to the Greek spanakopita
Polenta		Pampas	porridge	cornmeal boiled into a porridge, usually served with cheese and sometimes tomato sauce
Pollo al disco		Northwest	stew	a stew of chicken and vegetables cooked in a deep round dish over an open fire
Revuelto Gramajo			hash	A common Argentine breakfast dish consisting of fried julienne potatoes, eggs, cheese and vegetables.
Sorrentinos			pasta	A type of ravioli created in Mar del Plata by immigrants from Sorrento, Italy
Vitel toné			meat dish	cold, sliced veal covered with a creamy, mayonnaise-like sauce that has been flavored with tuna. It is considered a traditional Christmas dish.

=== Sauces ===
Name	Image	Region	Type	Description
Chimichurri			Cold sauce	sauce used for grilled meat, and marinate fish, and other white meats. It contains: parsley, garlic, salt, peppercorn, chili pepper flakes, oregano, green onion, olive oil, vinegar, lemon juice (fresh) and water.

== See also ==
- List of cuisines
