= Albert Levy Themans =

Dutch bobsledder

Personal information
- Nationality: Dutch
- Born: 8 May 1889; Amsterdam, Netherlands
- Died: 24 May 1959 (aged 70); Amsterdam, Netherlands
- Employer: NV voorheen De Nijs en Co
- Spouse: Geertruida Muller

Sport
- Country: Netherlands
- Sport: Bobsleigh

Albert Jacobus Levy (8 May 1889 – 24 May 1959; also spelled Levij and Lévy), known as Albert Levy Themans and eventually as Albert Themans, was a Dutch bobsledder, executive, and briefly a political activist. He was the first Dutch athlete to be replaced right before the Winter Olympics.

== Career ==
=== Bobsleigh ===
Levy Themans started competing in bobsleigh competitions in the winter of 1922–23. Both as pilot and brakeman, he was successful in winning several prizes outside the Netherlands. He was selected to be part of the four-man event at the 1928 Winter Olympics. Until the end of January, the newspapers wrote about him as a member of the Olympic team. At the last moment, on 30 January 1928 it was announced that Levy Themans would not compete. Due to a heavy strike of the staff at the family-owned factory, Levy Themans chose to withdraw. He was replaced by Edwin Teixeira de Mattos, who coincidently also had Jewish roots.

=== Business and politics ===
Albert Levy worked for his father's shoe manufacturing business, NV voorheen (formerly) De Nijs en Co. In April 1918, Levy met the Minister of Agriculture, Commerce and Industry, Folkert Posthuma. The meeting informed the minister before making a decision on the shoes that would remain rationed on vouchers. De Nijs en Co was plagued by strikes, one of which caused Levy Themans to withdraw from the Olympics.

Levy Themans led the Amsterdam branch of the short-lived General Dutch Fascist League (1932–1934). He was criticized by Jewish supporters of the Social Democratic Workers' Party for his limited political knowledge. As Levy Themans pointed out, the General Dutch Fascist League was not antisemitic. (Its leader, Jan Baars, later joined the resistance against the Nazi occupation of the Netherlands.)

== Personal ==
Albert Levy was born on 8 May 1889 in Amsterdam. He was born and raised in a Jewish family. His father, Samuel Levy (1857–1929), was a merchant born in Veenendaal, who had become a shoe manufacturer and tradesman in Amsterdam. His mother, Mietje Mathilda Themans (1855–1918), who his father married after widowing for the first time, hailed from Dalfsen. Eight days after turning twenty, on 17 May 1909, Albert Levy was drafted into the Second Regiment of the fortification artillery at the Oranje-Nassau Kazerne in Amsterdam. He also served in the reserves. Albert's service released his younger brother, Johan Reinhard (born 1892), from the need to enlist.

On 17 August 1939, when he was 50, Levy Themans married for the first time. His wife, Geertruida Muller, was only 22 years old at that time. They first had a son. Under the threat of The Holocaust, the family tried to relocate in 1942–43 to Italy. The third wife and widow of Levy Themans' father and the in-laws of his brother were murdered. Albert and family survived the war and still had a daughter. He died on 24 May 1959 in Amsterdam.
