= Arturo Gramajo =

Argentine bobsledder (1897–1957)

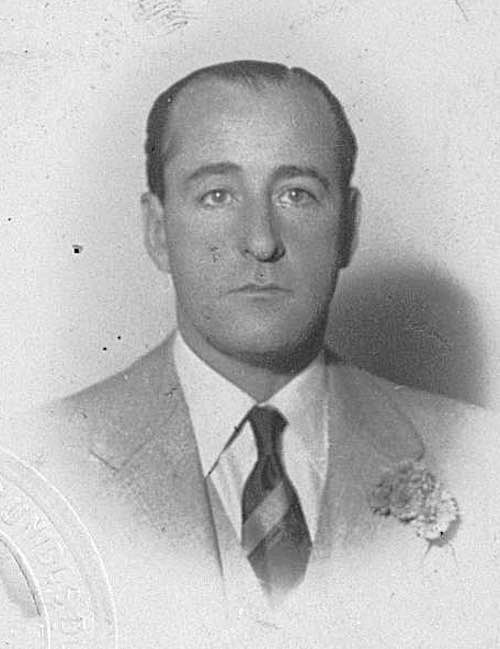

Personal information
- Full name: Jorge Arturo Gramajo Atucha
- Born: 30 April 1897 Buenos Aires, Argentina
- Died: 4 December 1957 (aged 60) Buenos Aires, Argentina

Sport
- Sport: Bobsleigh

Jorge Arturo Gramajo Atucha (30 April 1897 – 4 December 1957) was an Argentine bobsledder and food inventor. Born in Buenos Aires, he later lived in Paris, most likely as a diplomat. During that time, he was selected to be part of the Argentine team at the 1928 Winter Olympics in the bobsleigh, placing fourth. He was also credited to the creation of a hash dish named Revuelto Gramajo.

== Biography ==
Jorge Arturo Gramajo Atucha was born on 30 April 1897 in Buenos Aires, Argentina. He was born to María Adela Atucha and Arturo Gramajo Cárdenas, the mayor of Buenos Aires from 1915 to 1916. Gramajo had three sisters and one brother.

During the 1920s, Gramajo lived in Paris and was most likely a diplomat at the Argentine Embassy. While he lived in Paris, he had a reputation for being a playboy and was acquaintances with people who worked in Hollywood such as actress Ginger Rogers. He eventually married Hollywood dancer Colette Schmidt and had no children. At the 1928 Winter Olympics held in St. Moritz, Switzerland, he was named to the Argentine team and was the flagbearer during the opening ceremony. There, he competed in the bobsleigh. His brother, Horacio Gramajo, competed with another Argentinian team. With his team, Arturo placed fourth with a combined total of 3:22.6, missing out on a medal.

Gramajo is also credited to the creation of Revuelto Gramajo, a classic Argentine hash dish consisting of fried julienned potatoes, ham and eggs. While in Paris during the 1930s, he wanted to eat late at night but the hotel where he was staying at informed him that the kitchens were closed. He used his status to persuade the chefs to make him a dish. Gramajo was also a founding member of the Argentina Ski Club and the Federación Argentina de Ski y Andinismo. He died on 4 December 1957 in Buenos Aires at the age of 60.
