= Hans-Edgar Endres =

German bobsledder

Personal information
- Nationality: German
- Born: 17 August 1894; Metz, France

Sport
- Sport: Bobsleigh

Hans-Edgar Endres (born 17 August 1894, date of death unknown) was a German bobsledder. He competed in the four-man event at the 1928 Winter Olympics.
