= René Ansermoz =

Swiss bobsledder

Personal information
- Nationality: Swiss
- Born: March 7, 1906
- Died: March 23, 1963 (aged 57)

Sport
- Sport: Bobsleigh

René Ansermoz (March 7, 1906 - March 23, 1963) was a Swiss bobsledder. He competed in the four-man event at the 1928 Winter Olympics.
