= Hubert Kryn =

Belgian bobsledder

Personal information
- Nationality: Belgian

Sport
- Sport: Bobsleigh

Hubert Kryn was a Belgian bobsledder. He competed in the four-man event at the 1928 Winter Olympics.
