= Ernest Casimir-Lambert =

Belgian bobsledder (1897–1931)

Personal information
- Nationality: Belgian
- Born: 19 June 1897; Brussels, Belgium
- Died: 24 April 1931 (aged 33); Monte Carlo, Monaco

Sport
- Sport: Bobsleigh

Ernest Casimir-Lambert (19 June 1897 – 24 April 1931) was a Belgian bobsledder. He competed in the four-man event at the 1928 Winter Olympics.
