= Figure skating at the 1928 Winter Olympics =

Figure skating at the II Winter Olympics
- Type: Olympic Games

Champions
- Men's singles: (Sweden) Gillis Grafström
- Ladies' singles: (Norway) Sonja Henie
- Pairs: (France) Andrée Joly / Pierre Brunet
- Previous: 1924 Winter Olympics
- Next: 1932 Winter Olympics

Figure skating at the 1928 Winter Olympics took place at the Olympic Ice Rink in St. Moritz, Switzerland, between 14 and 19 February 1928. Three figure skating events were contested: men's singles, ladies' singles, and pair skating.

Unseasonably warm weather in St. Moritz during the Games caused difficulty for the figure skating events, as the ice surface was outdoors. There was a proposal to move the competition to an indoor rink in Berlin or London, but colder weather returned before a decision could be made. However, the ice surface remained in poor condition for the duration of the Games. During the ladies' free skating, red flags were placed on the ice to mark the especially bad areas, which became more numerous as the competition progressed.

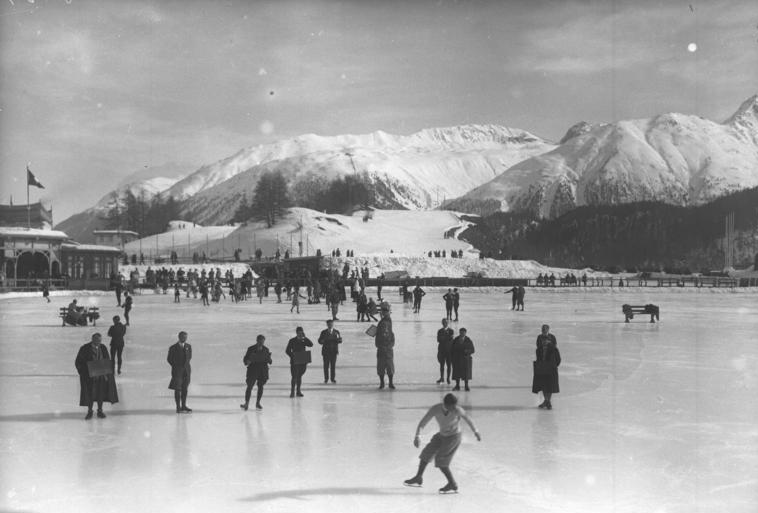
Gillis Grafström during the compulsory figures at the 1928 Olympics

== Medal summary ==
=== Medalists ===
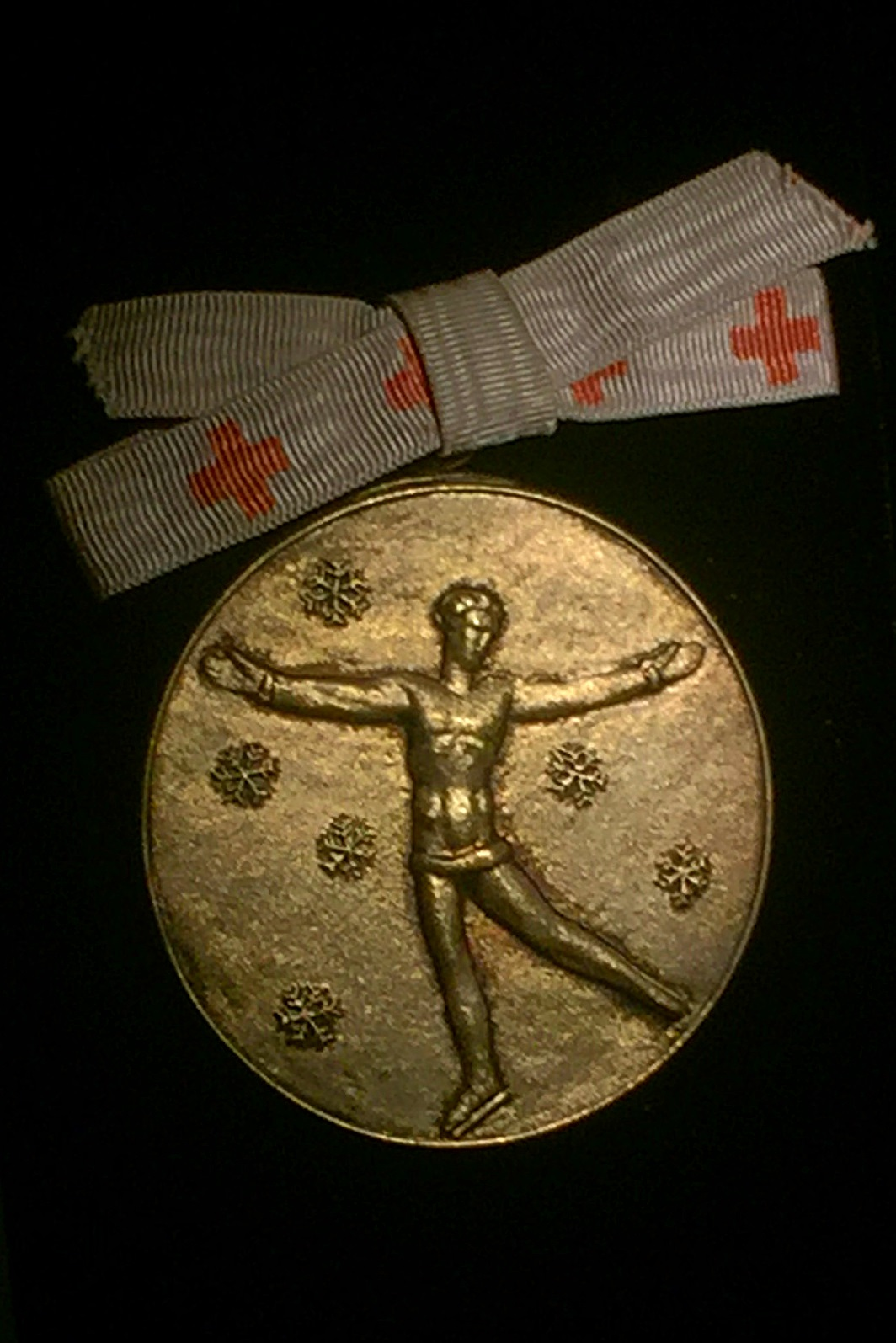
Sonja Henie's gold medal from the 1928 Winter Olympics

Event	Gold	Silver	Bronze
Men's singles	Gillis Grafström (SWE)	Willy Böckl (AUT)	Robert Van Zeebroeck (BEL)
Ladies' singles	Sonja Henie (NOR)	Fritzi Burger (AUT)	Beatrix Loughran (USA)
Pairs skating	Andrée Joly and Pierre Brunet (FRA)	Lilly Scholz and Otto Kaiser (AUT)	Melitta Brunner and Ludwig Wrede (AUT)

=== Medal table ===
Again, only Austria was able to win more than one medal, but this time without winning a gold medal.

Rank	Nation	Gold	Silver	Bronze	Total
1	France	1	0	0	1
1	Norway	1	0	0	1
1	Sweden	1	0	0	1
4	Austria	0	3	1	4
5	Belgium	0	0	1	1
5	United States	0	0	1	1
Totals (6 entries)		3	3	3	9

== Participating nations ==
Twelve figure skater (seven men and five women) competed in both the singles and the pairs event.

A total of 51 figure skaters (23 men and 28 women) from eleven nations (men from eleven nations and women from eleven nations) competed at the St. Moritz Games:

- Austria (9) (men 4, women 5)
- Belgium (2) (men 1, women 1)
- Canada (5) (men 2, women 3)
- Czechoslovakia (3) (men 2, women 1)
- Finland (3) (men 2, women 1)
- France (3) (men 1, women 2)
- Germany (8) (men 3, women 5)
- Great Britain (5) (men 3, women 2)
- Norway (4) (men 0, women 4)
- Sweden (1) (men 1, women 0)
- Switzerland (2) (men 1, women 1)
- United States (6) (men 3, women 3)
