= Paul Martin (bobsleigh) =

German bobsledder

Personal information
- Nationality: German

Sport
- Sport: Bobsleigh

Paul Martin was a German bobsledder. He competed in the four-man event at the 1928 Winter Olympics.
