= Franz Pamperl =

Austrian bobsledder

Personal information
- Nationality: Austrian
- Born: 7 September 1897

Sport
- Sport: Bobsleigh

Franz Pamperl (born 7 September 1897, date of death unknown) was an Austrian bobsledder. He competed in the four-man event at the 1928 Winter Olympics.
