= Walter Brück =

Austrian ice hockey player

Personal information
- Nationality: Austrian
- Born: 30 November 1900 Vienna, Austria-Hungary
- Died: 28 August 1968 (aged 67) Carmel-by-the-Sea, California, United States

Sport
- Sport: Ice hockey

Walter Delano Brück (30 November 1900 – 28 August 1968) was an Austrian ice hockey player. He competed in the men's tournament at the 1928 Winter Olympics.
