= Bernard Fawcett =

British ice hockey player

Personal information
- Nationality: British
- Born: 28 April 1909 Lewisham, London, England
- Died: 28 December 1961 (aged 52) Chichester, England

Sport
- Sport: Ice hockey

Bernard Hill Fawcett (28 April 1909 – 28 December 1961) was a British ice hockey player. He competed in the men's tournament at the 1928 Winter Olympics.
