= Ricardo González (bobsleigh) =

Argentine bobsledder (1900–1947)

Personal information
- Born: 13 October 1900; Buenos Aires, Argentina
- Died: 22 June 1947 (aged 46); Genoa, Italy

Sport
- Sport: Bobsleigh

Ricardo Carlos González Moreno Saguier (13 October 1900 – 22 June 1947) was an Argentine bobsledder. He competed in the four-man event at the 1928 Winter Olympics.
