= Alexandru Berlescu =

Romanian bobsledder

Personal information
- Nationality: Romanian
- Born: 22 July 1894

Sport
- Sport: Bobsleigh

Alexandru Berlescu (22 July 1894 - May 1981) was a Romanian bobsledder. He competed in the four-man event at the 1928 Winter Olympics.
