= Revuelto Gramajo =

Argentine potato and egg dish

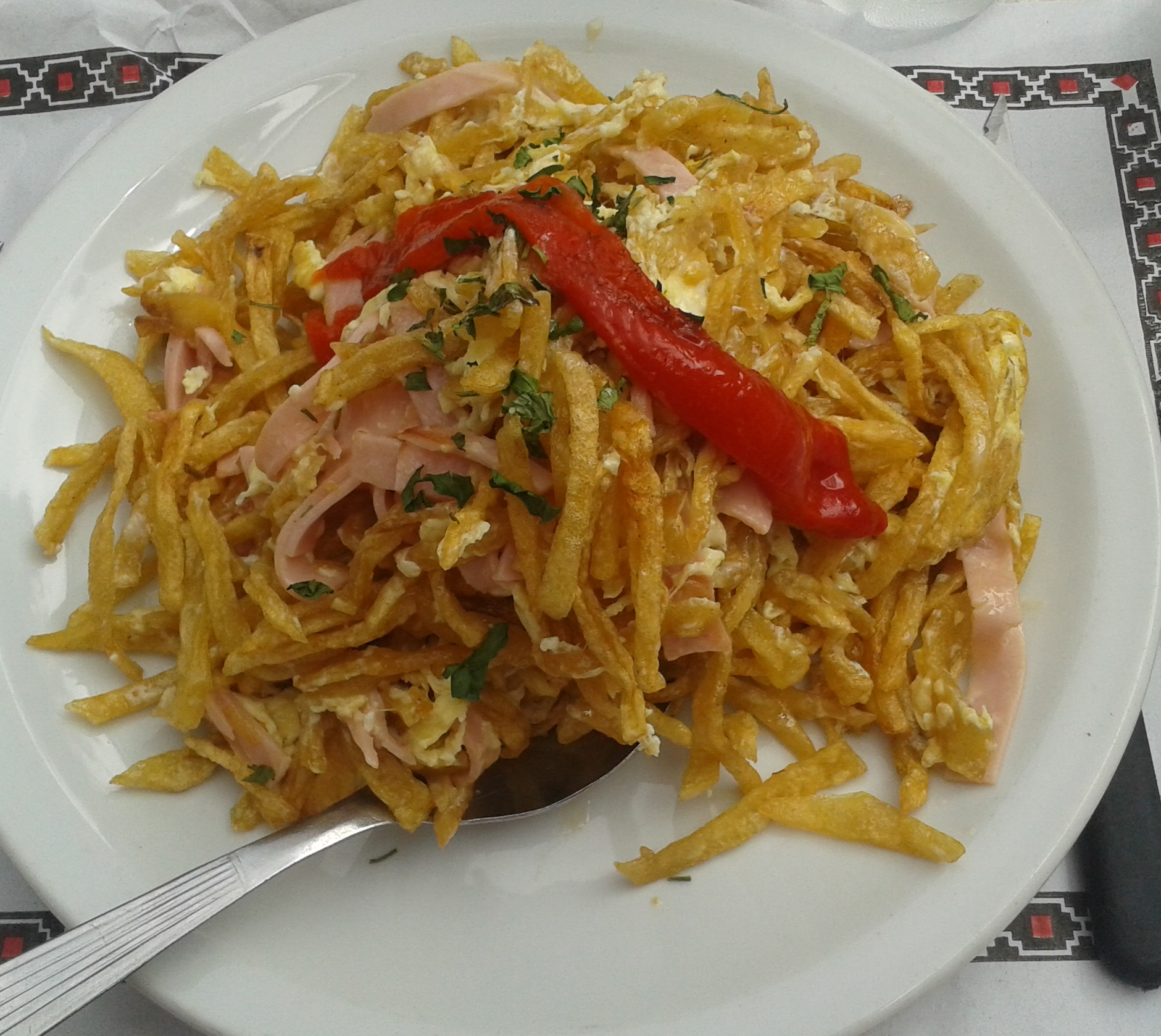
Revuelto Gramajo

Revuelto Gramajo (English: Gramajo scramble) is a common hash dish in Argentine cuisine consisting of fried julienned potatoes, ham and eggs. The dish can be adapted to use any ingredients the cook may have on hand, including peas, other fresh vegetables, fish, pork, and other meats. It is common in Buenos Aires, and has been described as one of the city's "quintessential" dishes. French fries are sometimes used as an ingredient in the dish.

== Etymology ==
Revuelto Gramajo is attributed to and named after Colonel Artemio Gramajo (June 1838 – 1914), a former government administrator of Buenos Aires.

More recent attribution of the dish is to Argentine Olympic bobsledder Arturo Gramajo.

== See also ==
- List of Argentine dishes
- List of meat and potato dishes
- Bauernfrühstück
