= Jerzy Łucki =

Polish sportsperson

Personal information
- Nationality: Polish
- Born: 24 September 1898 Drohobycz, Austria-Hungary
- Died: 18 September 1939 (aged 40) Kuty, Stanisławów Voivodeship, Poland

Sport
- Sport: Bobsleigh

Jerzy Michał Łucki (24 September 1898 – 18 September 1939) was a Polish bobsledder, military officer and athlete. He competed in the four-man event at the 1928 Winter Olympics.

Łucki was a military officer, serving initially in the Polish Legions, then in the Polish Army. He was an active athlete in his military unit and the Pogoń Lwów athletics team, winning the bronze medal at the Polish Athletics Championships twice in shot put (1923, 1927) and once in hammer throw (1923).

After the Soviet invasion of Poland he fought in the defence of Lwów. Łucki most likely died on 18 September 1939 in Kuty, Stanisławów Voivodeship, while evacuating his unit over the border to Romania. He was awarded the Cross of Independence.
