= Eduard Pechanda =

Austrian bobsledder

Personal information
- Nationality: Austrian
- Born: 8 November 1893
- Died: 10 May 1946 (aged 52)

Sport
- Sport: Bobsleigh

Eduard Pechanda (8 November 1893 – 10 May 1946) was an Austrian bobsledder. He competed in the four-man event at the 1928 Winter Olympics.
