= William Beamish =

French bobsledder

Personal information
- Nationality: French
- Born: 30 May 1888; Thonon-les-Bains, France
- Died: 2 January 1969 (aged 80); Paris, France

Sport
- Sport: Bobsleigh

William Beamish (30 May 1888 – 21 January 1969) was a French bobsledder. He competed in the four-man event at the 1928 Winter Olympics.
