= Thomas Warner (bobsleigh) =

British bobsledder (1903–1965)

Personal information
- Full name: Thomas Seymour Marius Warner
- Nationality: British
- Born: 5 November 1903; Chelsea, England
- Died: 26 December 1965 (aged 62); Bridgwater, England

Sport
- Sport: Bobsleigh

Thomas Warner (5 November 1903 – 26 December 1965) was a British bobsledder. He competed in the four-man event at the 1928 Winter Olympics.
