= Joseph Dedeyn =

French bobsledder

Personal information
- Nationality: French
- Born: 11 December 1880
- Died: 4 June 1940 (aged 59)

Sport
- Sport: Bobsleigh

Joseph Dedeyn (11 December 1880 – 4 June 1940) was a French bobsledder. He competed in the four-man event at the 1928 Winter Olympics.
