= Jorge del Carril =

Argentine bobsledder

Personal information
- Born: 4 November 1904; Santa Rosa, Argentina

Sport
- Sport: Bobsleigh

Carlos Jorge del Carril Garmendia (born 4 November 1904, date of death unknown) was an Argentine bobsledder. He competed in the four-man event at the 1928 Winter Olympics.
