= Eugen Ștefănescu =

Romanian bobsledder

Personal information
- Nationality: Romanian
- Born: 15 May 1904

Sport
- Sport: Bobsleigh

Eugen Ștefănescu (born 15 May 1904, date of death unknown) was a Romanian bobsledder. He competed in the four-man event at the 1928 Winter Olympics.
