= Héctor Milberg =

Argentine bobsledder (1904–1972)

Personal information
- Born: 17 October 1904; Buenos Aires, Argentina
- Died: 1972 (aged 67–68)

Sport
- Sport: Bobsleigh

Héctor Milberg Bossi (17 October 1904 – 1972) was an Argentine bobsledder. He competed in the four-man event at the 1928 Winter Olympics.
