= Petre Petrovici =

Romanian bobsledder

Personal information
- Nationality: Romanian
- Born: 5 December 1899

Sport
- Sport: Bobsleigh

Petre Petrovici (born 5 December 1899, died September 1974) was a Romanian bobsledder. He competed in the four-man event at the 1928 Winter Olympics.
