= Jerzy Bardziński =

Polish bobsledder (1892–1933)

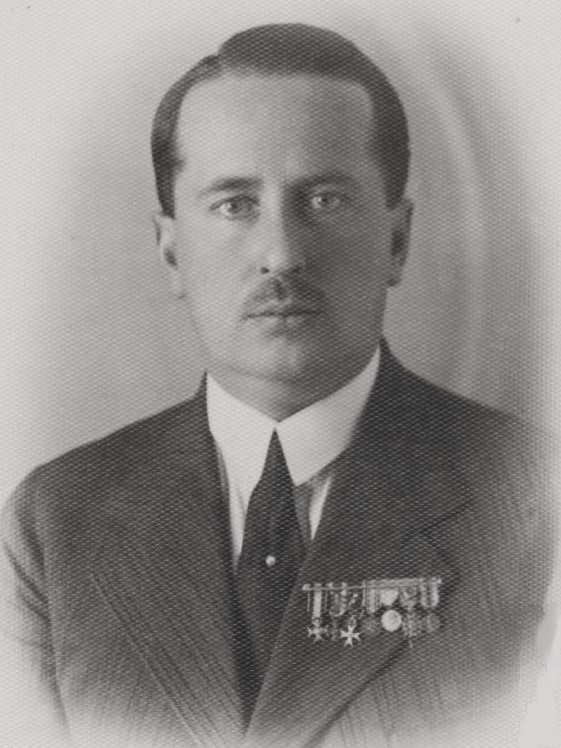

Personal information
- Nationality: Polish
- Born: 23 November 1892 Sokołów, Warsaw Governorate, Congress Poland, Russian Empire
- Died: 26 October 1933 (aged 40) Warsaw, Poland

Sport
- Sport: Bobsleigh

Jerzy Bardziński (23 November 1892 – 26 October 1933) was a Polish bobsledder. He competed in the four-man event at the 1928 Winter Olympics.

Bardziński was a cavalry officer in the Polish Army. He fought in the Polish-Soviet War. For his actions he was later awarded the Silver Cross of the Virtuti Militari, Officer's Cross of the Order of Polonia Restituta and the Cross of Valour.
