= Jerzy Potulicki-Skórzewski =

Polish bobsledder

Personal information
- Nationality: Polish
- Born: 27 July 1894; Kaltenleutgeben, Austria-Hungary
- Died: 15 August 1950 (aged 56); Abidjan, French West Africa

Sport
- Sport: Bobsleigh

Jerzy Potulicki-Skórzewski (27 July 1894 – 15 August 1950) was a Polish bobsledder. He competed in the four-man event at the 1928 Winter Olympics.
