= Gustav Mader =

Austrian bobsledder

Personal information
- Nationality: Austrian
- Born: 28 March 1899; Vienna, Austria-Hungary
- Died: 18 April 1945 (aged 46); Rijeka, Croatia

Sport
- Sport: Bobsleigh

Gustav Mader (28 March 1899 – 18 April 1945) was an Austrian bobsledder. He competed in the four-man event at the 1928 Winter Olympics. He was killed in action during World War II.
