= Antoni Bura =

Polish bobsledder (1898–1980)

Personal information
- Nationality: Polish
- Born: 22 December 1898; Karviná, Austria-Hungary
- Died: 13 December 1980 (aged 81); Katowice, Poland

Sport
- Sport: Bobsleigh

Antoni Bura (22 December 1898 – 13 December 1980) was a Polish bobsledder, mechanical engineer and independence activist. He competed in the four-man event at the 1928 Winter Olympics.

He was born in Karwina in the region of Cieszyn Silesia, a son of a carpenter. Bura graduated from Juliusz Słowacki Polish Grammar School in Orlová, then from the mechanical engineering at the Lwów Polytechnic in Lwów. During World War I, he was conscripted into the Austro-Hungarian Army and joined the Polish Military Organisation. Afterwards, he volunteered for the Polish forces in the Polish-Soviet War. For his actions, he was later awarded the Cross of Valour.
