= Reginald Spevak =

Austrian ice hockey player

- Born: February 21, 1898 Vienna, Austria-Hungary
- Died: July 22, 1959 (aged 61) Vienna, Austria
- Position: Defence/Right Wing
- National team: Austria
- Playing career: 1918–1930

Peregrin Reginald Spevak (February 21, 1898 in Vienna – July 22, 1959 in Vienna) was an Austrian ice hockey player who competed in the 1928 Winter Olympics.

In 1928 he participated with the Austrian ice hockey team in the Olympic tournament.
