= Great Britain at the 1928 Winter Olympics =

- Flag of the United Kingdom
- IOC code: GBR
- NOC: British Olympic Association

in St. Moritz
- Competitors: 32 (29 men, 3 women) in 5 sports
- Medals Ranked 8th: Gold 0 Silver 0 Bronze 1 Total 1

Winter Olympics appearances (overview)
- 1924; 1928; 1932; 1936; 1948; 1952; 1956; 1960; 1964; 1968; 1972; 1976; 1980; 1984; 1988; 1992; 1994; 1998; 2002; 2006; 2010; 2014; 2018; 2022; 2026

The United Kingdom of Great Britain and Northern Ireland competed as Great Britain at the 1928 Winter Olympics in St. Moritz, Switzerland. These games marked the first time in Olympic History that Great Britain didn't take a gold medal.

== Medallists ==
Medal	Name	Sport	Event
Bronze	David Carnegie	Skeleton	Men's single event

== Bobsleigh ==
Sled	Athletes	Event	Run 1		Run 2		Total	
Sled	Athletes	Event	Time	Rank	Time	Rank	Time	Rank
GBR-1	Henry Martineau; Walter Birch; John Dalrymple; John Gee; Edward Hall	Five-man	1:40.6	4	1:45.7	15	3:26.3	10
GBR-2	George Pim; Guy Tracey; David Griffith; Frederick Browning; Thomas Warner	Five-man	1:41.7	5	1:44.5	10	3:26.2	9

== Figure skating ==
Men

Athlete	Event	CF	FS	Places	Points	Final rank
Ian Bowhill	Men's singles	15	14	101	1202.25	14
Jack Page	Men's singles	8	11	62	1424.00	9

Women

Athlete	Event	CF	FS	Places	Points	Final rank
Kathleen Shaw	Women's singles	11	19	95	1900.00	14

Pairs

Athletes	Points	Score	Final rank
Kathleen Lovett; Proctor Burman	110.5	57.75	13
Ethel Muckelt; Jack Page	61.5	79.00	7

== Ice hockey ==
=== Group A ===
The top team (highlighted) advanced to the medal round.

Team	GP	W	L	GF	GA
Great Britain	3	2	1	10	6
France	3	2	1	6	5
Belgium	3	2	1	9	10
Hungary	3	0	3	2	6

February 11	Great Britain	7–3 (3–1,2–0,2–2)	Belgium
February 12	France	3–2 (0–1,3–1,0–0)	Great Britain
February 15	Great Britain	1–0 (1–0,0–0,0–0)	Hungary

=== Medal round ===
The top teams from each of the three groups, plus Canada, which had received a bye into the medal round, played a 3-game round-robin to determine the medal winners.

Team	GP	W	L	GF	GA
Canada	3	3	0	38	0
Sweden	3	2	1	7	12
Switzerland	3	1	2	4	17
Great Britain (4th)	3	0	3	1	21

February 17	Switzerland	4:0 (0:0,2:0,2:0)	Great Britain
February 18	Canada	14:0 (6:0,4:0,4:0)	Great Britain
February 19	Sweden	3:1 (2:1,0:0,1:0)	Great Britain

4th	Great Britain
	Wilbert Brown; Colin Carruthers; Eric Carruthers; Ross Cuthbert; Bernard Fawcett; Harold Greenwood; Frederick Melland; John Rogers; Blaine Sexton; William Speechly; Victor Tait; Charles Wyld

== Skeleton ==
Athlete	Run 1		Run 2		Run 3		Total	
Athlete	Time	Rank	Time	Rank	Time	Rank	Time	Rank
John, Earl of Northesk	1:02.7	4	1:01.0	3	1:01.4	2	3:05.1	3rd place, bronze medalist(s)

== Speed skating ==
Men

Event	Athlete	Race	
Event	Athlete	Time	Rank
500 m	Cyril Horn	54.9	32
500 m	Leonard Stewart	54.8	31
500 m	Fred Dix	53.4	30
1500 m	Fred Dix	2:49.6	28
1500 m	Leonard Stewart	2:48.9	27
1500 m	Cyril Horn	2:40.0	24
5000 m	Fred Dix	10:55.6	32
5000 m	Leonard Stewart	10:40.0	31
5000 m	Cyril Horn	9:45.0	23
