= Mariano de María =

Argentine bobsledder

Personal information
- Nationality: Argentine
- Born: 31 August 1901

Sport
- Sport: Bobsleigh

Mariano José de María Sala (born 31 August 1901, date of death unknown) was an Argentine bobsledder. He competed in the four-man event at the 1928 Winter Olympics.
