= Bertrand du Pontavice de Heussey =

French bobsledder

Personal information
- Nationality: French
- Born: 19 December 1892 Angers, France
- Died: 16 May 1953 (aged 60) Paris, France

Sport
- Sport: Bobsleigh

Bertrand du Pontavice de Heussey (19 December 1892 – 16 May 1953) was a French bobsledder. He competed in the four-man event at the 1928 Winter Olympics.
