= Hans Kail =

Austrian ice hockey player

Personal information
- Nationality: Austrian

Sport
- Sport: Ice hockey

Hans Kail was an Austrian ice hockey player. He competed in the men's tournament at the 1928 Winter Olympics.
