= Eduardo Hope =

Argentine bobsledder

Personal information
- Born: 29 April 1891; Buenos Aires, Argentina

Sport
- Sport: Bobsleigh

Eduardo Hope Gould (born 29 April 1891, date of death unknown) was an Argentine bobsledder. He competed in the four-man event at the 1928 Winter Olympics.
