= Jean Rheims =

French bobsledder

Jean Rheins
Personal information
- Nationality: French
- Born: April 2, 1902 Paris
- Died: July 1, 1983 (aged 81) Paris

Sport
- Sport: Bobsleigh

Jean Jules Rheims (2 April 1902 – 1 July 1983) was a French bobsledder. He competed in the four-man event at the 1928 Winter Olympics.
