= Aleksander Rozmus =

Polish ski jumper

Personal information
- Nationality: Polish
- Born: 18 January 1901; Zakopane, Poland
- Died: 18 April 1986 (aged 85); Paris, France

Sport
- Sport: Ski jumping

Aleksander Rozmus (18 January 1901 – 18 April 1986) was a Polish ski jumper. He competed in the individual event at the 1928 Winter Olympics.
