= Horacio Iglesias (bobsleigh) =

Argentine bobsledder

Personal information
- Born: 1 January 1903; Buenos Aires, Argentina

Sport
- Sport: Bobsleigh

Horacio Alfredo Iglesias Baseil (1 January 1903 - date of death unknown) was an Argentine bobsledder. He competed in the four-man event at the 1928 Winter Olympics.
