= John Victor Nash =

Argentine bobsledder

Personal information
- Born: 14 June 1891; Carcarañá, Argentina

Sport
- Sport: Bobsleigh

John Victor Nash (born 14 June 1891, date of death unknown) was an Argentine bobsledder. He competed in the four-man event at the 1928 Winter Olympics.

Argentine-born John Victor Nash was a captain in the British Army. During World War I he served in the Royal Flying Corps. In 1919 Nash married Jean Gazlay Sifton (née Donaldson), the third of her six marriages, and they spent the following years in London. Only a short time after their wedding she had accumulated bills for dresses, shoes and furs for hundreds of thousands of dollars. During the divorce case the judge reportedly called her the best dressed and most extravagant woman in the world. They were eventually divorced in 1923. Even though probably still a British citizen he joined the Argentinian bob team at St. Moritz in 1928, which did exceptionally well, missing the bronze medal by only 0.7 seconds. In 1931, Nash was listed in a passenger list as a cattle breeder arriving in London from Argentina.
