= Horia Roman =

Romanian bobsledder

Personal information
- Nationality: Romanian
- Born: 14 July 1894; Bucharest, Austria-Hungary
- Died: 1990 (aged 95–96)

Sport
- Sport: Bobsleigh

Horia Roman (14 July 1894 – 1990) was a Romanian bobsledder. He competed in the four-man event at the 1928 Winter Olympics.
