= Stéphane de la Rochefoucault =

French bobsledder

Personal information
- Nationality: French

Sport
- Sport: Bobsleigh

Stéphane de la Rochefoucault was a French bobsledder. He competed in the four-man event at the 1928 Winter Olympics. De la Rochefoucault is deceased.
