= Franz Unterlechner =

Austrian skeleton racer

Franz Unterlechner (born 4 October 1891; date of death unknown) was an Austrian skeleton racer who competed in the late 1920s. He finished sixth in the men's skeleton event at the 1928 Winter Olympics in St. Moritz.
