= Walter Birch (bobsleigh) =

British bobsledder

Personal information
- Nationality: British
- Born: 27 June 1898
- Died: 18 December 1965 (aged 67)

Sport
- Sport: Bobsleigh

Walter Birch (27 June 1898 – 18 December 1965) was a British bobsledder. He competed in the four-man event at the 1928 Winter Olympics.
