= Traian Nițescu =

Romanian engineer and bobsledder

Personal information
- Nationality: Romanian
- Born: 11 October 1902 Craiova, Romania
- Died: 19 April 1984 (aged 81) Calgary, Alberta, Canada

Sport
- Sport: Bobsleigh

Traian Nițescu (11 October 1902 – 19 April 1984) was a Romanian engineer. He competed in the bobsleigh four-man event at the 1928 Winter Olympics.
