= Lyman Hine =

American bobsledder

Olympic medal record

Bobsleigh
Silver medal – second place	1928 St. Moritz	Five-man

Lyman Northrop Hine (June 22, 1888 – March 5, 1930) was an American bobsledder who competed in the late 1920s. Born in Brooklyn, New York, he won a silver medal in the five-man bobsleigh event at the 1928 Winter Olympics in St. Moritz. Lyman Is buried in Locust Valley Cemetery, Locust Valley, New York.
