= Geoffrey Mason =

American bobsledder

Medal record

Men's bobsleigh

Representing the United States

Olympic Games
| Gold medal – first place | 1928 St. Moritz | Five-man |

Geoffrey Travers Mason (May 13, 1902 – January 5, 1987) was an American bobsledder who competed in the 1928 Winter Olympics.

Responding to a newspaper article in Paris, Mason was invited to join the Olympics. Then, nineteen days after seeing a bobsled for the first time, he won a gold medal as part of the victorious U.S. five-man team at the 1928 Winter Olympics in St. Moritz and came home with the American flag from the event.

Mason was born in Philadelphia, Pennsylvania and died in Rumford, Rhode Island.
