= Roger Petit-Didier =

French bobsledder

Personal information
- Nationality: French
- Born: 17 May 1904
- Died: 15 March 1969 (aged 64)

Sport
- Sport: Bobsleigh

Roger Petit-Didier (17 May 1904 – 15 March 1969) was a French bobsledder. He competed in the four-man event at the 1928 Winter Olympics.
