= Otto Kaiser (figure skater) =

Austrian figure skater (1901–1977)

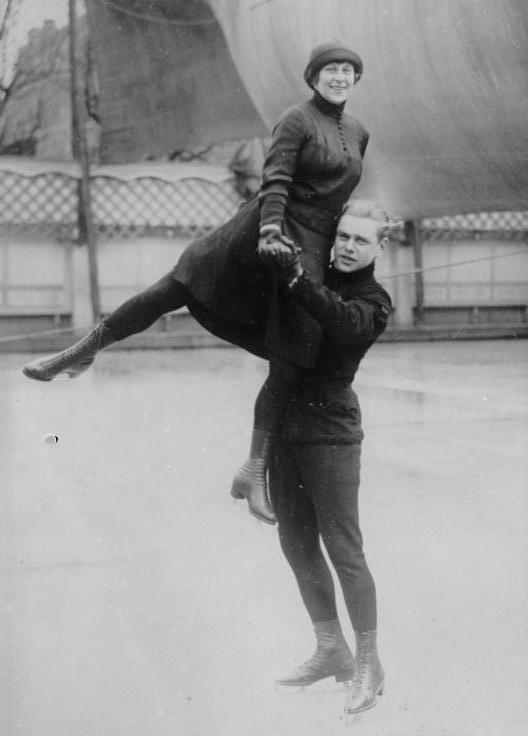
- Scholz and Kaiser at a pre-Olympic event in 1928

Personal information
- Born: 8 May 1901
- Died: 7 June 1977 (aged 76)

Figure skating career
- Country: Austria
- Partner: Lilly Scholz
Medal record
Representing Austria
Figure skating: Pairs
Olympic Games
Silver medal – second place	1928 St. Moritz	Pairs
World Championships
Gold medal – first place	1929 Budapest	Pairs
Silver medal – second place	1928 London	Pairs
Silver medal – second place	1927 Vienna	Pairs
Silver medal – second place	1926 Berlin	Pairs
Bronze medal – third place	1925 Vienna	Pairs

Otto Kaiser (8 May 1901 – 7 June 1977) was an Austrian pair skater. Competing in partnership with Lilly Scholz, he became the 1928 Olympic silver medalist and 1929 World champion. The pair won the bronze medal at Worlds in 1925 and silver from 1926 through 1928.

== Results ==
(with Lilly Scholz)

International
Event	1924	1925	1926	1927	1928	1929
Winter Olympics					2nd	
World Championships		3rd	2nd	2nd	2nd	1st
National
Austrian Championships	1st			1st	1st	1st
