= Nion R. Tucker =

American bobsledder

Medal record

Bobsleigh

Representing the United States

Olympic Games
Gold medal – first place	1928 St. Moritz	Five-man

Nion Robert Tucker Sr. (August 21, 1885 – April 22, 1950) was an American banker, civic official, and sportsman who completed in the 1928 Winter Olympics in St. Moritz, winning a gold medal in the five-man bobsleigh event. He was born in Suisun, California, and graduated from the University of California at Berkeley 1909. He was married to Phyllis de Young, a daughter of San Francisco Chronicle founder M. H. de Young. He died at the Palace Hotel in San Francisco.
