= John Heaton (athlete) =

American bobsledder and skeleton racer

Olympic medal record

Representing the United States

Men's Skeleton
Silver medal – second place	1928 St. Moritz	Men
Silver medal – second place	1948 St. Moritz	Men

Men's Bobsleigh
Bronze medal – third place	1932 Lake Placid	Two-man

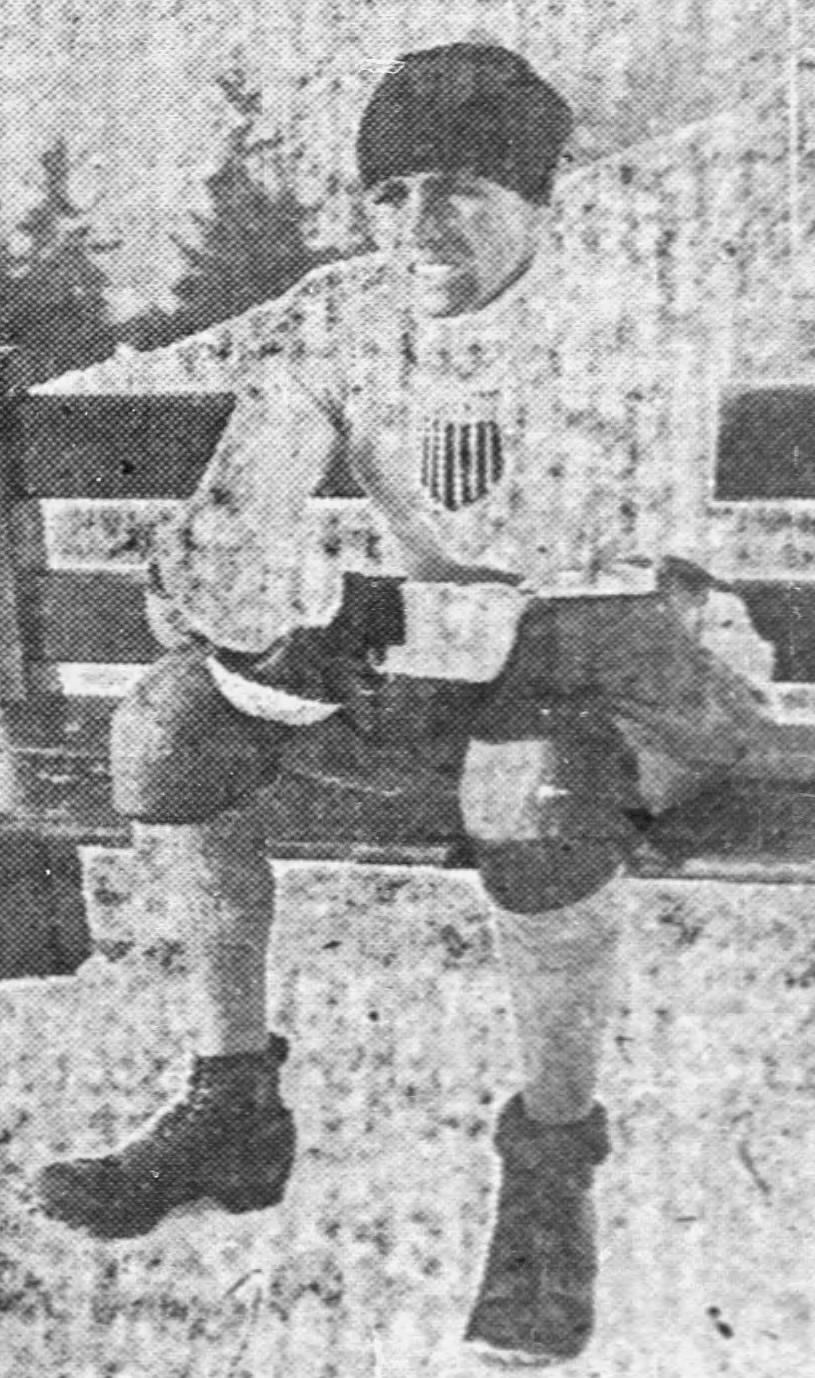
Heaton in 1928

John Rutherford Heaton (September 8, 1908 – September 10, 1976) was an American bobsledder and skeleton racer who competed from the late 1920s to the late 1940s.

Heaton was the youngest son of John Edward Heaton and Florence Caroline Trowbridge of New Haven, Connecticut. He had two brothers, Jennison (also an Olympic bobsledder and skeleton racer) and Trowbridge. Heaton married four times, first to Gwendolyn Robinson de Alzaga Unzue in 1937. He married Denise Paule Genest in 1950 and had a son, John Edward Heaton, born in 1951. He then married Heidi Von Lauer Mundchofen in 1959 and Beatrix Bayer in 1965.

Heaton competed in three Winter Olympics in 1928, 1932, and 1948. He won two silver medals in the skeleton in 1928 and 1948, and one bronze in the bobsled in 1932. At the 1948 games in St. Moritz, Switzerland, he was the American team's flag bearer at the opening ceremonies.

In the late 1920s, Heaton toured the world with friends Billy Fiske (fellow Olympic medalist and World War II hero) and Francis "Frankie" Rhodes (nephew of Cecil Rhodes). They traveled to Tahiti, Bali, India and South Africa.

The Heaton Gold Cup was presented in 1933 by the three Heaton brothers and their mother. It remains one of the classic skeleton events of the St. Moritz "Cresta" season. Heaton was one of the pioneers of the Portillo ski resort and skiing in Chile in the 1940s. The Roca Jack is named after him. Heaton died in Paris, France, in 1976 at age 68.

Olympic Games
Preceded by Al Jochim	Flagbearer for United States; St. Moritz 1948	Succeeded by Ralph Craig
