= Louis Hasenknopf =

Austrian skeleton racer (1890–??)

Personal information
- Nationality: Austrian
- Born: 1 November 1890

Sport
- Sport: Skeleton

Achievements and titles
- Olympic finals: 8th (1928)
- Updated on 18 June 2016

Louis Hasenknopf (born 1 November 1890, date of death unknown) was an Austrian skeleton racer who competed in the late 1920s. He finished eighth in the men's skeleton event at the 1928 Winter Olympics in St. Moritz.
