= Rafael Iglesias (bobsleigh) =

Argentine bobsledder

Personal information
- Nationality: Argentine

Sport
- Sport: Bobsleigh

Rafael Iglesias was an Argentine bobsledder. He competed in the four-man event at the 1928 Winter Olympics. Iglesias is deceased.
