= Ion Gavăț =

Romanian bobsledder

Personal information
- Nationality: Romanian
- Born: 19 July 1900; Tâmboești, Kingdom of Romania
- Died: 18 June 1978 (aged 77); Bucharest, Romania

Sport
- Sport: Bobsleigh

Ion Gavăț (19 July 1900 – 18 June 1978) was a Romanian bobsledder. He competed in the four-man event at the 1928 Winter Olympics.
