= Thomas Doe =

American bobsledder (1912–1969)

Olympic medal record

Men's Bobsleigh
Silver medal – second place	1928 St. Moritz	Five-man

Thomas Bartwell Doe Jr. (October 12, 1912 – July 19, 1969) was an American bobsledder who competed in the late 1920s. He won a silver medal in the five-man bobsleigh event at the 1928 Winter Olympics in St. Moritz. He died in Charlotte, North Carolina.
