= Valentin Krempl =

German bobsledder (1904–1945)

Olympic medal record

Men's Bobsleigh

Representing Germany
| Bronze medal – third place | 1928 St. Moritz | Five-man |

Valentin Krempl (15 April 1904 – 31 December 1945) was a German bobsledder who competed in the late 1920s. He won a bronze medal in the five-man event at the 1928 Winter Olympics in St. Moritz. This was the first medal Germany earned at the Winter Olympics.
