= Jacques Petit-Didier =

French bobsledder

Personal information
- Nationality: French
- Born: 6 February 1900
- Died: 12 November 1983 (aged 83)

Sport
- Sport: Bobsleigh

Jacques Petit-Didier (6 February 1900 – 12 November 1983) was a French bobsledder. He competed in the four-man event at the 1928 Winter Olympics.
