= Sebastian Huber =

German bobsledder (1901–1985)

Medal record

Men's Bobsleigh

Representing Germany

Representing Germany

Olympic Games
| Bronze medal – third place | 1928 St. Moritz | Five-man |
| Bronze medal – third place | 1932 Lake Placid | Four-man |

World Championships
| Gold medal – first place | 1931 Oberhof | Two-man |
| Gold medal – first place | 1934 Garmisch-Partenkirchen | Four-man |
| Gold medal – first place | 1935 St. Moritz | Four-man |

Sebastian "Wastl" Huber (26 June 1901 in Füssen – 6 March 1985 in Munich) was a German bobsleigher who competed from the late 1920s to the mid-1930s. Competing in three Winter Olympics, he won two bronze medals at the Winter Olympics, earning Germany its first Winter Olympic medal in (1928) and in the four-man event (1932).

Huber earned three gold medals at the FIBT World Championships with one in the two-man event (1931) and two in the four-man event (1934, 1935).
