= Jennison Heaton =

American bobsledder and skeleton racer

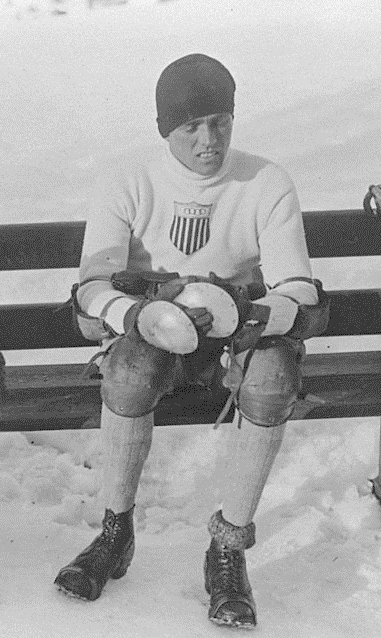
- Jennison Heaton at the 1928 Olympics

Personal information
- Born: April 16, 1904 New Haven, Connecticut, United States
- Died: August 6, 1971 (aged 67) Burlingame, California, United States

Sport
- Sport: skeleton, bobsleigh
Medal record
Representing the United States
Olympic Games
Skeleton
Gold medal – first place	1928 St. Moritz	Skeleton
Bobsleigh
Silver medal – second place	1928 St. Moritz	Five-man bobsleigh

Jennison Heaton (April 16, 1904 – August 6, 1971) was an American bobsled and skeleton racer. He competed at the 1928 Winter Olympics and won a gold medal in the skeleton event and a silver in the five-man bobsleigh competition. In the skeleton, Heaton beat the silver medalist (his younger brother John) by one second. His other brother Trowbridge was also a bobsleigh enthusiast. Heaton later married Beulah Fiske, becoming the brother-in-law of Billy Fiske, also an Olympic bobsledder.
