= Horacio Gramajo =

Argentine bobsledder (1900–1943)

Personal information
- Born: 10 May 1900; Buenos Aires, Argentina
- Died: 8 April 1943 (aged 42); Buenos Aires, Argentina

Sport
- Sport: Bobsleigh

Horacio Antonio Gramajo Atucha (10 May 1900 – 8 April 1943) was an Argentine bobsledder. He competed in the four-man event at the 1928 Winter Olympics.
