= David Granger (bobsleigh) =

American bobsledder and businessman

Olympic medal record

Bobsleigh
Silver medal – second place	1928 St. Moritz	Five-man

David Granger CBE (January 26, 1903 – September 27, 2002) was an American bobsledder and businessman who competed in the late 1920s. He won a silver medal in the five-man bobsleigh event at the 1928 Winter Olympics in St. Moritz. He died in New York City.

Granger graduated from Phillips Exeter Academy and Yale, and attended Christ's College, Cambridge. He married in 1950 and had a son.

He held a New York Stock Exchange seat for longer than anyone else in history - from 1926 until his death in 2002. He joined his father's Wall Street firm, Sulzbacher, Granger & Co. (now a part of Ingalls & Snyder), at age 23 and purchased his seat for $143,000. He still went to work regularly until his health began to fail two years before his death, by which time he already held his longevity record.

He served in World War II, rising to the rank of major and earning the Order of the British Empire for helping supply Britain with war planes. He was injured in the 1975 bombing of Fraunces Tavern.

He served on the board of the Museum of the City of New York and as a trustee of the Cathedral of St. John the Divine. He also was a director of the English-Speaking Union.
