= Grigore Socolescu =

Romanian bobsledder

Personal information
- Nationality: Romanian
- Born: 7 August 1905

Sport
- Sport: Bobsleigh

Grigore Socolescu (7 August 1905 - 1995) was a Romanian bobsledder. He competed in the four-man event at the 1928 Winter Olympics.
