= Mircea Socolescu =

Romanian bobsledder

Personal information
- Nationality: Romanian
- Born: 14 July 1902; Bucharest, Austria-Hungary
- Died: 5 October 1993 (aged 91); Bucharest, Romania

Sport
- Sport: Bobsleigh

Mircea Socolescu (14 July 1902 – 5 October 1993) was a Romanian bobsledder. He competed in the four-man event at the 1928 Winter Olympics.
