= Hans Hess (bobsleigh) =

German bobsledder

Olympic medal record

Men's Bobsleigh

Representing Germany
Bronze medal – third place	1928 St. Moritz	Five-man

Hans Hess (born 1902, date of death unknown) was a German bobsledder who competed in the late 1920s. He won a bronze medal in the five-man event at the 1928 Winter Olympics in St. Moritz. This was the first medal Germany had ever earned at the Winter Olympics.
