= Richard Parke =

American bobsledder

Medal record

Bobsleigh

Representing the United States

Olympic Games
Gold medal – first place	1928 St. Moritz	Five-man

Richard Averell Parke (December 13, 1893 – August 23, 1950) was an American bobsledder who competed in the late 1920s. He won a gold medal in the five-man event at the 1928 Winter Olympics in St. Moritz. He graduated from Cornell University where he was a member of Delta Kappa Epsilon.
