= Curt van de Sandt =

Dutch bobsledder

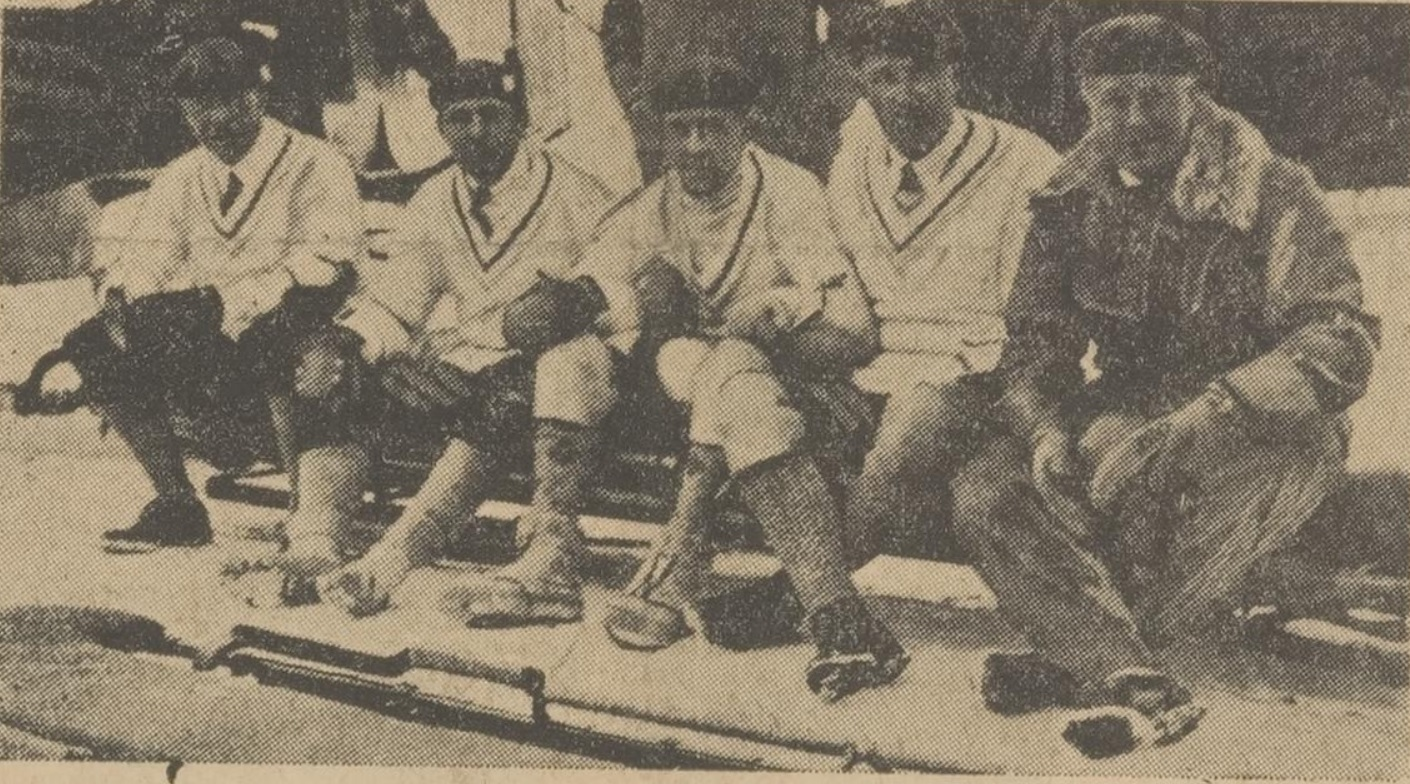
- Van de Sandt (left) at the 1928 Winter Olympics

Personal information
- Nationality: Dutch
- Born: 28 June 1885; Hamburg, Germany
- Died: 3 August 1930 (aged 45); Plainpalais, Switzerland

Sport
- Sport: Bobsleigh

Curt van de Sandt (28 June 1885 – 3 August 1930) was a Dutch bobsledder. He competed in the four-man event at the 1928 Winter Olympics.
