= Edwin Teixeira de Mattos =

Dutch bobsledder

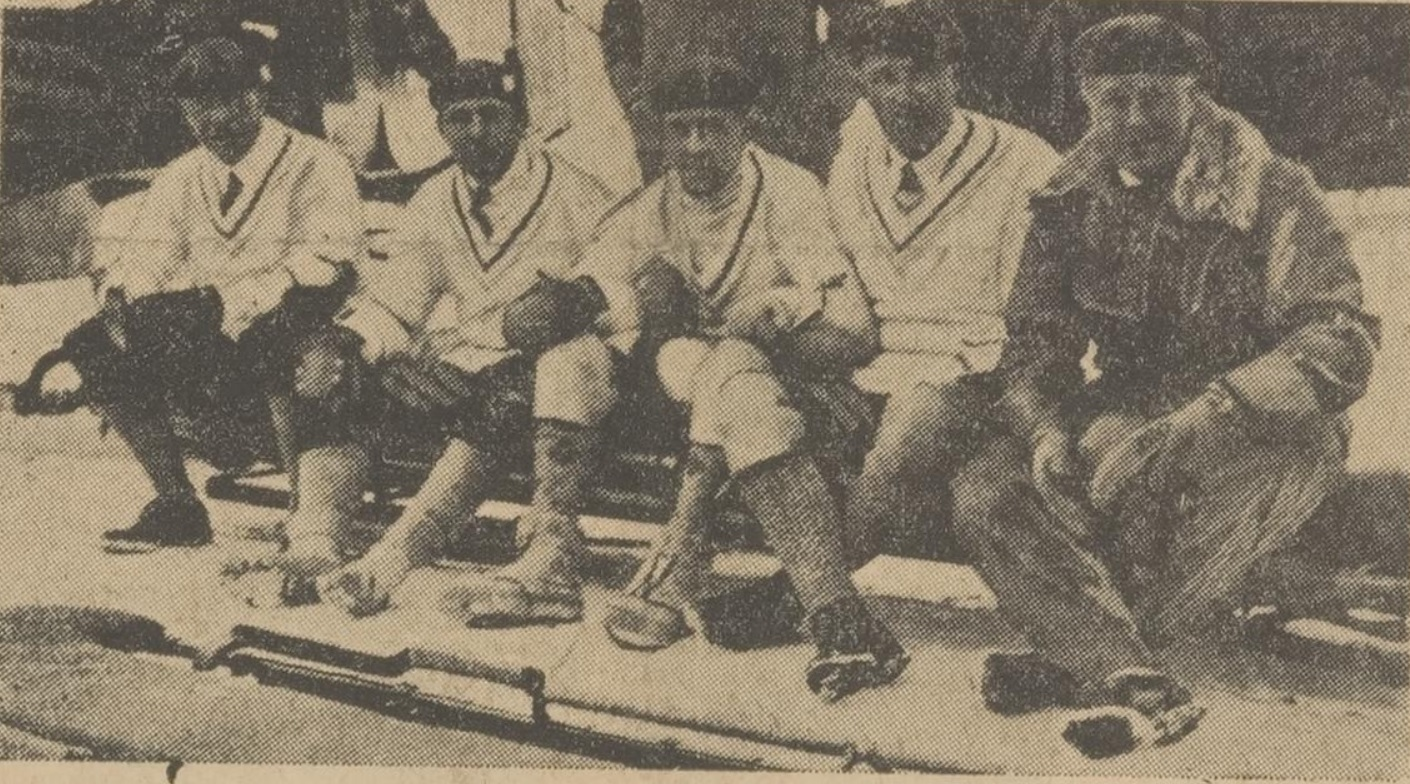
- Teixeira de Mattos (middle) at the 1928 Winter Olympics

Personal information
- Nationality: Dutch
- Born: 28 January 1898; Amsterdam, Netherlands
- Died: 15 January 1976 (aged 77); The Hague, Netherlands

Sport
- Sport: Bobsleigh

Edwin Teixeira de Mattos (28 January 1898 – 15 January 1976) was a Dutch bobsledder. He competed in the four-man event at the 1928 Winter Olympics. At the last moment he was selected for the team, after Albert Levy Themans had to withdraw due to heavy strikes at his factory. He was the flagbearer, and so the first Dutch flagbearer at the Olympic Winter Games.

Teixeira de Mattos was a jonkheer, coming from a noble family with Portuguese-Jewish roots. He was employed by the Netherlands Government Information Service.
