= Canada at the 1928 Winter Olympics =

- IOC code: CAN
- NOC: Canadian Olympic Committee
- Website: www.olympic.ca (in English and French)

in St. Moritz
- Competitors: 23 (20 men, 3 women) in 6 sports
- Flag bearer: John Porter
- Medals Ranked 5th: Gold 1 Silver 0 Bronze 0 Total 1

Winter Olympics appearances (overview)
- 1924; 1928; 1932; 1936; 1948; 1952; 1956; 1960; 1964; 1968; 1972; 1976; 1980; 1984; 1988; 1992; 1994; 1998; 2002; 2006; 2010; 2014; 2018; 2022; 2026

Canada competed at the 1928 Winter Olympics in St. Moritz, Switzerland. Canada has competed at every Winter Olympic Games.

The Canadian Olympic Committee appointed W. A. Hewitt as head of mission for Canada at the 1928 Winter Olympics. He oversaw travel arrangements for the delegation which included figure skating, speed skating, skiing, and ice hockey. Hewitt and the Canadian delegation totalled 47 people, and sailed from Halifax aboard SS Arabic to Cherbourg, then travelled to St. Moritz. Hewitt and the delegation then returned to Canada aboard SS Celtic.

== Medalists ==
Medal	Name	Sport	Event	Date
Gold	Canada men's national ice hockey team (University of Toronto): Charles Delahaye; Frank Fisher; Grant Gordon; Louis Hudson; Norbert Mueller; Herbert Plaxton; Hugh Plaxton; Roger Plaxton; John Porter; Frank Sullivan; Joseph Sullivan; Ross Taylor; Dave Trottier	Ice hockey	Men's competition	February 19

== Cross-country skiing ==
Men

Event	Athlete	Race	
Event	Athlete	Time	Rank
18 km	Merritt Putman	2'22:40	41
18 km	William Thompson	2'12:24	38

== Figure skating ==
Men

Athlete	Event	CF	FS	Places	Points	Final rank
Jack Eastwood	Men's singles	17	15	106	1136.25	16
Montgomery Wilson	Men's singles	11	16	92	1345.00	13

Women

Athlete	Event	CF	FS	Places	Points	Final rank
Constance Wilson-Samuel	Women's singles	5	5	35	2173.00	6
Cecil Smith	Women's singles	2	8	32	2213.75	5

Pairs

Athletes	Points	Score	Final rank
Maude Smith; Jack Eastwood	95.5	67.25	10

== Ice hockey ==
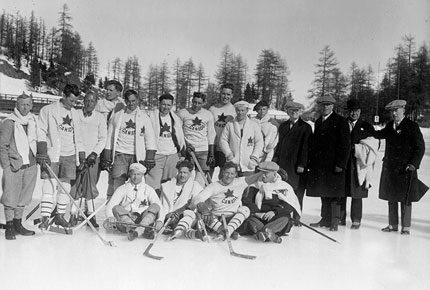
University of Toronto Graduates at the 1928 Winter Olympics

The University of Toronto Graduates as the 1927 Allan Cup champions were chosen to represent Canada in ice hockey, and Hewitt oversaw the team's finances at the Olympics. Conn Smythe coached the team during the OHA season, but refused to go to the Olympics due to disagreements on which players were added to the team by the Canadian Olympic Committee. The Graduates went without Smythe, led by team captain Red Porter.

Hewitt was opposed to the format of the hockey tournament at the Olympics, which saw the Canadian team receive a bye into the second round. He wanted the team to have more games, rather than be idle for a week. Despite the wait to play, the Graduates won all three games by scoring 38 goals and conceding none, to win the gold medal.

=== Medal round ===
The top teams from each of the three groups, plus Canada, which had received a bye into the medal round, played a 3 game round-robin to determine the medal winners.

Team	GP	W	L	GF	GA
Canada (gold)	3	3	0	38	0
Sweden	3	2	1	7	12
Switzerland	3	1	2	4	17
Great Britain	3	0	3	1	21

February 17	Canada	11:0 (4:0,5:0,2:0)	Sweden
February 18	Canada	14:0 (6:0,4:0,4:0)	Great Britain
February 19	Switzerland	0:13 (0:4,0:4,0:3)	Canada

=== Top scorer ===
Team	GP	G	A	Pts
(Canada) Dave Trottier	3	12	3	15

Gold:
Canada

Charles Delahaye
Frank Fisher
Grant Gordon
Louis Hudson
Norbert Mueller
Herbert Plaxton
Hugh Plaxton
Roger Plaxton
John Porter
Frank Sullivan
Joseph Sullivan
Ross Taylor
Dave Trottier

== Nordic combined ==
Events:

- 18 km cross-country skiing
- normal hill ski jumping

The cross-country skiing part of this event was combined with the main medal event of cross-country skiing. Those results can be found above in this article in the cross-country skiing section. Some athletes (but not all) entered in both the cross-country skiing and Nordic combined event, their time on the 18 km was used for both events. One would expect that athletes competing at the Nordic combined event, would participate in the cross-country skiing event as well, as they would have the opportunity to win more than one medal. This was not always the case due to the maximum number of athletes that could represent a country per event.

The ski jumping (normal hill) event was held separate from the main medal event of ski jumping, results can be found in the table below.

Athlete	Event	Cross-country			Ski Jumping				Total	
Athlete	Event	Time	Points	Rank	Distance 1	Distance 2	Total points	Rank	Points	Rank
William Thompson	Individual	DNF	–	–	–	–	–	–	DNF	–
Merritt Putman	Individual	2'22:40	0.000	26	35.0	37.5	9.708	26	4.854	27

== Ski jumping ==
Athlete	Event	Jump 1 (Dist.)	Jump 2 (Dist.)	Total	
Athlete	Event	Jump 1 (Dist.)	Jump 2 (Dist.)	Points	Rank
Gerald Dupuis	Normal hill	49.0	57.0	15.500	15

== Speed skating ==
Men

Event	Athlete	Race	
Event	Athlete	Time	Rank
500 m	Ross Robinson	45.9	14
500 m	Willy Logan	45.2	11
500 m	Charles Gorman	43.9	7
1500 m	Willy Logan	2:35.6	21
1500 m	Ross Robinson	2:32.3	17
1500 m	Charles Gorman	2:28.4	12
5000 m	Willy Logan	10:10.3	29
5000 m	Ross Robinson	9:38.9	22

== Sources ==
- Podnieks, Andrew (1997). Canada's Olympic Hockey Teams: The Complete History 1920–1998. Toronto, Ontario: Doubleday Canada. ISBN 0-385-25688-4.
- Comité Olympique Suisse (1928). Résultats des Concours des II^{mes} Jeux Olympiques d'hiver (PDF) (in French). Lausanne: Imprimerie du Léman. Archived from the original (PDF) on 2010-12-17.
- "Olympic Medal Winners". International Olympic Committee. Archived from the original on 2008-05-09.
- Olympic Winter Games 1928, full results by sports-reference.com
