= Switzerland at the 1928 Winter Olympics =

- IOC code: SUI
- NOC: Swiss Olympic Association
- Website: www.swissolympic.ch (in German and French)

in St. Moritz
- Competitors: 41 (40 men, 1 woman) in 7 sports
- Flag bearer: Hans Eidenbenz
- Medals Ranked 8th: Gold 0 Silver 0 Bronze 1 Total 1

Winter Olympics appearances (overview)
- 1924; 1928; 1932; 1936; 1948; 1952; 1956; 1960; 1964; 1968; 1972; 1976; 1980; 1984; 1988; 1992; 1994; 1998; 2002; 2006; 2010; 2014; 2018; 2022; 2026

Switzerland was the host nation of the 1928 Winter Olympics. It`participated in the event held at St. Moritz between 11 and 19 February 1928. The country's participation in the Games marked its second appearance at the Winter Olympics since its debut in the inaugural 1924 Games.

The Switzerland team consisted of 41 athletes who competed across seven sports. Hans Eidenbenz served as the country's flag-bearer during the opening ceremony. Switzerland won a lone bronze medal in the Games, and was ranked eighth in the overall medal table.

== Background ==
Switzerland first competed at the inaugural 1896 Olympic Games held in Athens. The country first formed a National Olympic Committee in 1902, which functioned only for the Olympic Games between 1904 and 1912. The Swiss Olympic Association was established on 7 October 1912 and was officially recognized by the International Olympic Committee (IOC) in the same year. The 1924 Winter Olympics marked Switzerland's first participation in the Olympic Games. After the nation made its debut in the Winter Olympics at the previous Games, this edition of the Games in 1928 marked the nation's second appearance at the Winter Games.

The 1928 Winter Olympics was held in St. Moritz, Switzerland, between 11 and 19 February 1928. The Switzerland team consisted of 41 athletes who competed across seven sports. Hans Eidenbenz served as the country's flag-bearer during the opening ceremony.

== Medalists ==
Switzerland won a lone bronze medal in the Games in Ice hockey, and was ranked eighth in the overall medal table.

Medal	Name	Sport	Event
Bronze	Switzerland men's national ice hockey team: Giannin Andreossi; Mezzi Andreossi; Robert Breiter; Louis Dufour; Charles Fasel; Albert Geromini; Fritz Kraatz; Arnold Martignoni; Heini Meng; Anton Morosani; Luzius Rüedi; Bibi Torriani	Ice hockey	Men's competition

== Competitors ==
Switzerland sent a delegation of 41 athletes including one woman athlete who competed in seven sports at the Games.

Sport	Men	Women	Athletes
Bobsleigh	10	0	10
Cross-country skiing	7	0	7
Figure skating	1	1	1
Ice hockey	12	0	12
Nordic combined	4	0	4
Skeleton	2	0	2
Ski jumping	4	0	4
Total	40	1	41 (Note: The overall total will not match the combined total of individual sports as select athletes competed across multiple sports.)

== Bobsleigh ==
Bobsleigh competitions were held at the Olympia Bobrun in St. Moritz. Two Swiss teams participated in the event in the sport. In the event, the second team (SUI-2) was placed fifth after the first run, followed by the first team (SUI-1) in tenth place. However, after the second runs, the first and second teams moved towards the opposite ends of the classification table, and recorded eighth and 13th place finished in the final classification.

Sled	Athletes	Event	Run 1		Run 2		Total	
Sled	Athletes	Event	Time	Rank	Time	Rank	Time	Rank
SUI-1	Charles Stoffel; Emil Coppetti; Henry Höhnes; Louis Koch; René Fonjallaz	Four/Five-man	1:43.1	10	1:42.6	7	3:25.7	8
SUI-2	André Moillen; Jean Moillen; John Schneiter; René Ansermoz; William Pichard	Four/Five-man	1:41.7	5	1:48.2	20	3:29.9	13

== Cross-country skiing ==
Cross-country skiing competitions were held at the Skistadion in St. Moritz. Eight men participated in the two Cross-country skiing events in the sport. Walter Bussmann took part in both the 18 km and 50 km events. Bussmann recorded the best finish in both the events for the nation. He recorded 15th place finishes in both the events.

Athlete	Event	Time	Rank
Alfons Julen	Men's 18 km	DNF	–
Florian Zogg	Men's 18 km	1'58:52	24
Otto Furrer	Men's 18 km	1'57:05	21
Walter Bussmann	Men's 18 km	1'49:46	15
Carlo Gourlaouen	Men's 50 km	5'55:09	22
Hans Zeier	Men's 50 km	DNF	–
Robert Wampfler	Men's 50 km	5'42:40	17
Walter Bussmann	Men's 50 km	5'38:49	15

== Figure skating ==
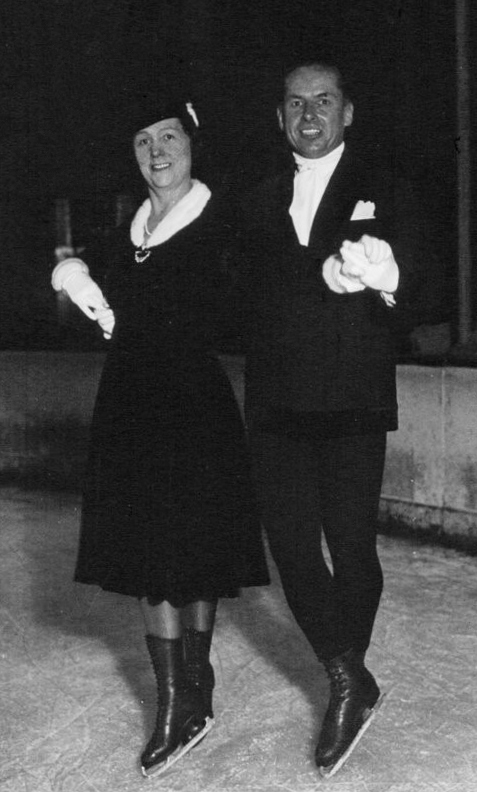
The couple Elvira Barbey and Louis Barbey participated in figure skating

Figure skating competitions were held at the Olympia-Eisstadion Badrutts Park in St. Moritz. Elvira Barbey was the lone woman athlete in the Games for Switzerland, and participated in two events in the figure skating competitions. She was joined by her husband Louis Barbey in the pairs event. In the events, the judges ranked each participant(s) by ordinal placement from first through last place, and the final placement was determined by a majority placement rule. While Elvira ranked 19th in the individual event, the pair was ranked 11th in the mixed event.

Athlete	Event	CF	FS	Places	Points	Rank
Elvira Barbey	Ladies' singles	19	16	125	1648.75	19
Elvira Barbey; Louis Barbey	Pairs	—N/a		97	64.75	11

== Ice hockey ==
Ice hockey competitions were held at the Olympia-Eisstadion Badrutts Park. There were eleven teams in the competition, and ten teams were divided into three groups in the first stage. The teams played each other team in the group in a round robin tournament. The top team advanced to the final stage, where they were joined by Canada. A final round robin tournament determined the medal placings.

The Switzerland team topped the table in the group stage with a win and a draw. In the final stage, the team lost against Canada and Sweden. However, a lone victory against Great Britain was enough to secure third place and a bronze medal.

Squad

Switzerland
Giannin Andreossi
Mezzi Andreossi
Robert Breiter
Louis Dufour
Charles Fasel
Albert Geromini
Fritz Kraatz
Arnold Martignoni
Heini Meng
Anton Morosani
Luzius Rüedi
Richard Torriani

Group stage

The top team advanced to the medal round.

Team	GP	W	L	T	GF	GA
Switzerland	2	1	0	1	5	4
Austria	2	0	0	2	4	4
Germany	2	0	1	1	0	1

11 February 1928

Switzerland	4–4	Austria

16 February 1928

Switzerland	1–0	Germany

Medal round

The top teams from each of the three groups, plus Canada, which had received a bye into the medal round, played a round-robin to determine the medal winners.

Team	GP	W	L	GF	GA
Canada	3	3	0	38	0
Sweden	3	2	1	7	12
Switzerland (bronze)	3	1	2	4	17
Great Britain	3	0	3	1	21

17 February 1928

Switzerland	4–0	Great Britain

18 February 1928

Switzerland	0–4	Sweden

19 February 1928

Switzerland	0–13	Canada

== Nordic combined ==
Nordic combined competitions were held at Skistadion and Olympiaschanze in St. Moritz. The competition consisted of two events–Normal hill ski jumping and 18 km cross-country skiing, and the final results were determined based on points from both the events. Switzerland was represented by four athletes in the competition. In the cross-country race, all the Swiss competitors were ranked between 13th and 20th places. In ski-jumping, they fared better, with Stephan Lauener registering a fourth place finish. In the final classification, Lauener was the highest ranked Swiss athlete in eleventh place, with the others finishing behind him the top 20.

Athlete	Event	Cross-country			Ski Jumping				Total	
Athlete	Event	Time	Points	Rank	Distance 1	Distance 2	Points	Rank	Points	Rank
Adolf Rubi	Individual men	1'56:40	10.250	14	46.5	54.0	15.000	12	12.625	11
David Zogg	Individual men	1'55:56	10.625	13	47.0	47.0	13.187	17	11.906	16
Hans Eidenbenz	Individual men	2'05:26	5.875	20	47.5	51.5	15.227	9	10.551	19
Stephan Lauener	Individual men	2'00:57	8.125	16	50.5	59.0	16.542	4	12.333	13

== Skeleton ==
The skeleton competitions were held at Cresta run. The competition consisted of three runs across the 1,231 m (4,039 ft) course. Switzerland was represented by two athletes in the competition. Due to inclement weather, the race was delayed by two days, and only ten participants took part. In the final rankings, only eight finishers were recorded, with Alexander Berner finishing in fifth place, missing out on a medal by three seconds.

Athlete	Event	Run 1		Run 2		Run 3		Total	
Athlete	Event	Time	Rank	Time	Rank	Time	Rank	Time	Rank
Alexander Berner	Men's individual	1:03.4	5	1:03.4	5	1:02.0	4	3:08.8	5
Willy von Eschen	Men's individual	1:04.8	6	DNF	–	–	–	DNF	–

== Ski jumping ==
Ski jumping competitions were held at the Olympiaschanze in St. Moritz. Four Swiss participants entered in the Ski jumping event in the men's category. The athletes had two jumps, with three judges scoring points and the final classification based on the average score. Sepp Mühlbauer and Ernst Feuz ranked in the top ten for Switzerland in the event.

Athlete	Event	Jump 1	Jump 2	Total	
Athlete	Event	Jump 1	Jump 2	Points	Rank
Bruno Trojani	Men's normal hill	48.5	63.0 (fall)	10.782	32
Ernst Feuz	Men's normal hill	52.5	58.5	16.458	8
Gérard Vuilleumier	Men's normal hill	57.5	62.0 (fall)	12.020	30
Sepp Mühlbauer	Men's normal hill	52.0	58.0	16.541	7
