= Plaxton (surname) =

Plaxton is a surname, common in Canada, and may refer to:

- Herbert Plaxton (1901–1970), Canadian ice hockey player
- Hugh Plaxton (1904–1982), Canadian ice hockey player
- Frederick William Plaxton, founder of the Plaxton bus and coach building company
- Roger Plaxton (1904–1963), Canadian ice hockey player
- William Plaxton (1843–1907), Canadian politician
