= Mollien =

Mollien is a surname. Notable people with the surname include:

- Félix Ravaisson-Mollien (1813-1900), French philosopher
- Gaspard Théodore Mollien (1796-1872), a French diplomat and explorer
- Nicolas François, Count Mollien (1758-1850), a French financier

== See also ==
- André Moillen (1906-1952), Swiss bobsledder, sometimes misreported as Mollien
- Jean Moillen (1903-1952), Swiss bobsledder, sometimes misreported as Mollien
- Molliens (disambiguation)
