= Mollen =

Mollen is a surname. Notable people with the surname include:

- Arne B. Mollén (1913–2000), Norwegian sports official
- Jenny Mollen (b. 1979), American actress

== See also ==
- André Moillen (1906–1952), Swiss bobsledder, sometimes misreported as Mollen
- Jean Moillen (1903–1952), Swiss bobsledder, sometimes misreported as Mollen
- Mollen Commission
- Mollens (disambiguation)
