= Ice hockey at the 1928 Winter Olympics =

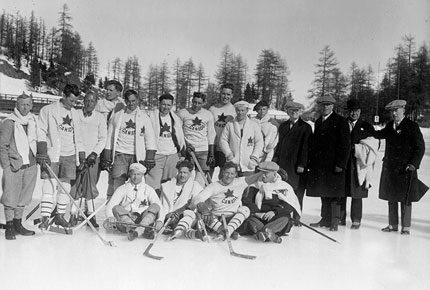
- Canada's 1928 Olympic Gold Medal team

Tournament details
- Host country: Switzerland
- Venue(s): Olympic Ice Rink, St. Moritz (outdoors)
- Dates: 11–19 February 1928
- Teams: 11

Final positions
- Champions: Canada (3rd title)
- Runners-up: Sweden
- Third place: Switzerland
- Fourth place: Great Britain

Tournament statistics
- Games played: 18
- Goals scored: 89 (4.94 per game)
- Scoring leader: (Canada) Dave Trottier (15 points)

The men's ice hockey tournament at the 1928 Winter Olympics in St. Moritz, Switzerland, was the third Olympic Championship, also serving as the third World Championships and the 13th European Championships. Canada, represented by the University of Toronto Graduates, won its third consecutive gold medal. Highest finishing European team Sweden won the silver medal and its third European Championship.

Conn Smythe coached the Graduates to the 1927 Allan Cup championship during the Ontario Hockey Association season, but refused to go to the Olympics due to disagreements on which players were added to the team by the Canadian Olympic Committee. The Graduates went without Smythe, led by team captain Red Porter. Canadian Olympic Committee member W. A. Hewitt was opposed to the format of the hockey tournament, which saw the Canadian team receive a bye into the second round. He wanted the team to have more games, rather than be idle for a week. Despite the wait to play, the Graduates won all three games by scoring 38 goals and conceding none, to win the gold medal.

== Medalists ==
Gold	Silver	Bronze
Canada Charles Delahaye; Frank Fisher; Grant Gordon; Louis Hudson; Norbert Mueller; Herbert Plaxton; Hugh Plaxton; Roger Plaxton; John Porter; Frank Sullivan; Joseph Sullivan; Ross Taylor; Dave Trottier	Sweden Carl Abrahamsson; Emil Bergman; Birger Holmqvist; Gustaf Johansson; Henry Johansson; Nils Johansson; Ernst Karlberg; Erik Larsson; Bertil Linde; Sigfrid Öberg; Wilhelm Petersén; Kurt Sucksdorff	Switzerland Giannin Andreossi; Mezzi Andreossi; Robert Breiter; Louis Dufour; Charles Fasel; Albert Geromini; Fritz Kraatz; Arnold Martignoni; Heini Meng; Anton Morosani; Luzius Rüedi; Richard Torriani

== Participating nations ==
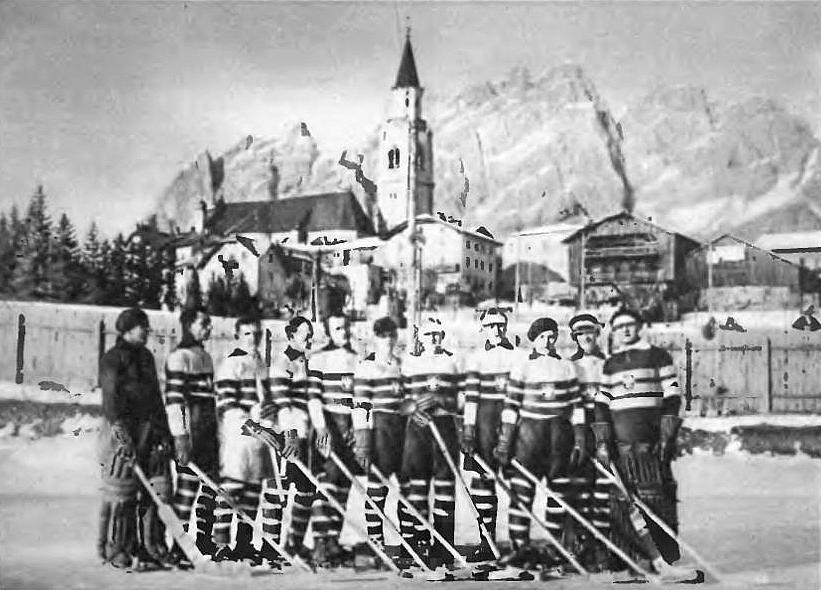
The Polish national team during the Olympics. This marked Poland's debut at Olympic ice hockey.

A total of 128(*) ice hockey players from eleven nations competed at the St. Moritz Games:

- Austria (12)
- Belgium (12)
- Canada (12)
- Czechoslovakia (11)
- France (12)
- Germany (11)
- Great Britain (12)
- Hungary (11)
- Poland (11)
- Sweden (12)
- Switzerland (12)

(*) NOTE: Only counts players who participated in at least one game. Not all reserve players are known.

Defending champion Canada, which outscored its opponents 132–3 in the previous competition, was granted a bye to the medal round, after officials realised how superior they were to all of the other teams. The other 10 teams were placed in three groups for the first round.

== First round ==
=== Group A ===
Pos	Team	Pld	W	D	L	GF	GA	GD	Pts	Qualification
1	Great Britain	3	2	0	1	10	6	+4	4	Advanced to Final Round
2	France	3	2	0	1	6	5	+1	4	
3	Belgium	3	2	0	1	9	10	−1	4	
4	Hungary	3	0	0	3	2	6	−4	0	

Updated to match(es) played on unknown. Source: HockeyCanada.ca

Date		Result		P1	P2	P3
11 Feb	Great Britain	7 - 3	Belgium	3 - 1	2 - 0	2 - 2
11 Feb	France	2 - 0	Hungary	0 - 0	2 - 0	0 - 0
12 Feb	France	3 - 2	Great Britain	0 - 1	3 - 1	0 - 0
12 Feb	Belgium	3 - 2	Hungary	0 - 1	3 - 1	0 - 0
13 Feb	Belgium	3 - 1	France	2 - 0	0 - 0	1 - 1
15 Feb	Great Britain	1 - 0	Hungary	1 - 0	0 - 0	0 - 0

=== Group B ===
Pos	Team	Pld	W	D	L	GF	GA	GD	Pts	Qualification
1	Sweden	2	1	1	0	5	2	+3	3	Advanced to Final Round
2	Czechoslovakia	2	1	0	1	3	5	−2	2	
3	Poland	2	0	1	1	4	5	−1	1	

Updated to match(es) played on unknown. Source: HockeyCanada.ca

Date		Result		P1	P2	P3
11 Feb	Sweden	3 - 0	Czechoslovakia	1 - 0	1 - 0	1 - 0
12 Feb	Sweden	2 - 2	Poland	1 - 0	1 - 2	0 - 0
13 Feb	Czechoslovakia	3 - 2	Poland	1 - 1	1 - 1	1 - 0

=== Group C ===
Pos	Team	Pld	W	D	L	GF	GA	GD	Pts	Qualification
1	Switzerland	2	1	1	0	5	4	+1	3	Advanced to Final Round
2	Austria	2	0	2	0	4	4	0	2	
3	Germany	2	0	1	1	0	1	−1	1	

Updated to match(es) played on unknown. Source: HockeyCanada.ca

Date		Result		P1	P2	P3
11 Feb	Switzerland	4 - 4	Austria	2 - 4	1 - 0	1 - 0
11 Feb	Austria	0 - 0	Germany	0 - 0	0 - 0	0 - 0
16 Feb	Switzerland	1 - 0	Germany	1 - 0	0 - 0	0 - 0

== Final round ==
The top teams from each of the three groups were joined by defending champion Canada in the medal round, playing a 3-game round-robin to determine the medal winners.

The match between Canada and Sweden was refereed by Paul Loicq, president of the International Ice Hockey Federation.

Pos	Team	Pld	W	D	L	GF	GA	GD	Pts
1	Canada	3	3	0	0	38	0	+38	6
2	Sweden	3	2	0	1	7	12	−5	4
3	Switzerland	3	1	0	2	4	17	−13	2
4	Great Britain	3	0	0	3	1	21	−20	0

Source: HockeyCanada.ca

Date		Result		P1	P2	P3
17 Feb	Canada	11 - 0	Sweden	4 - 0	4 - 0	3 - 0
17 Feb	Switzerland	4 - 0	Great Britain	0 - 0	2 - 0	2 - 0
18 Feb	Canada	14 - 0	Great Britain	6 - 0	4 - 0	4 - 0
18 Feb	Sweden	4 - 0	Switzerland	1 - 0	0 - 0	3 - 0
19 Feb	Sweden	3 - 1	Great Britain	2 - 1	0 - 0	1 - 0
19 Feb	Canada	13 - 0	Switzerland	2 - 0	6 - 0	5 - 0

== Statistics ==
=== Average age ===
Team Hungary was the oldest team in the tournament, averaging 31 years and 6 months. Team Belgium was the youngest team in the tournament, averaging 21 years and 6 months. Gold medalists Canada averaged 24 years and 10 months. Tournament average was 26 years and 9 months.

=== Top scorer ===
Team	GP	G	A	Pts
(Canada) Dave Trottier	3	12	3	15

== Final ranking ==
1	Canada
2	Sweden
3	Switzerland
4	Great Britain
5	Austria
5	France
5	Czechoslovakia
8	Belgium
8	Poland
8	Germany
11	Hungary

The IIHF Guide and Record Book has two different rankings for this tournament. The IOC, however, does not rank the teams below 4th

== European Championship medal table ==
1st place, gold medalist(s)	Sweden
2nd place, silver medalist(s)	Switzerland
3rd place, bronze medalist(s)	Great Britain
4	Austria
4	France
4	Czechoslovakia
7	Belgium
7	Germany
7	Poland
10	Hungary

== Sources ==
- Podnieks, Andrew (1997). Canada's Olympic Hockey Teams: The Complete History 1920–1998. Toronto, Ontario: Doubleday Canada. ISBN 0-385-25688-4.
- 1928 Olympic Games report (digitized copy online)
- International Olympic Committee results database
