= Romania at the 1932 Winter Olympics =

- IOC code: ROU
- NOC: Romanian Olympic and Sports Committee
- Website: www.cosr.ro (in Romanian, English, and French)

in Lake Placid
- Competitors: 4 (men) in 1 sport
- Medals: Gold 0 Silver 0 Bronze 0 Total 0

Winter Olympics appearances (overview)
- 1928; 1932; 1936; 1948; 1952; 1956; 1960; 1964; 1968; 1972; 1976; 1980; 1984; 1988; 1992; 1994; 1998; 2002; 2006; 2010; 2014; 2018; 2022; 2026

A total of four Romanian athletes competed in the 4-man and 2-man bobsled events at the 1932 Winter Olympics in Lake Placid, United States.

== Bobsleigh ==
| Sled | Athletes | Event | Run 1 | | Run 2 | | Run 3 | | Run 4 | | Total | |
| Sled | Athletes | Event | Time | Rank | Time | Rank | Time | Rank | Time | Rank | Time | Rank |
|---|---|---|---|---|---|---|---|---|---|---|---|---|
| ROU-1 | Alexandru Papană; Dumitru Hubert | Two-man | 2:15.51 | 7 | 2:07.82 | 4 | 2:06.12 | 5 | 2:03.02 | 4 | 8:32.47 | 4 |

| Sled | Athletes | Event | Run 1 | | Run 2 | | Run 3 | | Run 4 | | Total | |
| Sled | Athletes | Event | Time | Rank | Time | Rank | Time | Rank | Time | Rank | Time | Rank |
|---|---|---|---|---|---|---|---|---|---|---|---|---|
| ROU-1 | Alexandru Papană; Alexandru Ionescu; Ulise Petrescu; Dumitru Hubert | Four-man | 2:09.09 | 6 | 2:14.32 | 7 | 2:02.00 | 5 | 1:58.81 | 4 | 8:24.22 | 6 |
