= Andreossi =

Andreossi is a surname. Notable people with the surname include:

- Giannin Andreossi (1902–1964), Swiss ice hockey player
- Mezzi Andreossi (1897–1958), Swiss ice hockey player
