= Biasini =

Biasini is an Italian surname. Notable people with the surname include:

- Giorgio Biasini, Italian bobsledder
- Sarah Biasini (born 1977), French actress
- Oddo Biasini (1917–2009), Italian politician
