= Feuz =

Feuz (German pronunciation: [ˈfɔɪts]) is a surname. Notable people with the surname include:

- Beat Feuz (born 1987), Swiss ski racer
- Ernst Feuz (1908–1988), Swiss ski jumper
- Fritz Feuz (born 1931), Swiss gymnast
