= Gino Rossi =

Gino Rossi may refer to:

- Gino Rossi (bobsledder), Italian bobsledder in the 1920s and '30s
- Gino Rossi (boxer) (1908-1987), Italian boxer, 1932 Olympic silver medalist
- Gino Rossi (painter) (1884-1947), Italian painter
