= List of flag bearers for Switzerland at the Olympics =

Switzerland at the Olympics
- IOC code: SUI
- NOC: Swiss Olympic Association
- Website: www.swissolympic.ch (in German and French)
- Medals: Gold 117 Silver 128 Bronze 137 Total 382

Summer appearances
- 1896; 1900; 1904; 1908; 1912; 1920; 1924; 1928; 1932; 1936; 1948; 1952; 1956; 1960; 1964; 1968; 1972; 1976; 1980; 1984; 1988; 1992; 1996; 2000; 2004; 2008; 2012; 2016; 2020; 2024

Winter appearances
- 1924; 1928; 1932; 1936; 1948; 1952; 1956; 1960; 1964; 1968; 1972; 1976; 1980; 1984; 1988; 1992; 1994; 1998; 2002; 2006; 2010; 2014; 2018; 2022; 2026

Other related appearances
- 1906 Intercalated Games

This is a list of flag bearers who have represented Switzerland at the Olympics.

Flag bearers carry the national flag of their country at the opening ceremony of the Olympic Games.

#	Event year	Season	Flag bearer	Sport
1	1920	Summer	Luigi Antognini	Athletics (track and field)
2	1928	Winter	Hans Eidenbenz	Nordic combined
3	1932	Summer	Paul Martin	Athletics (track and field)
4	1936	Summer	Paul Martin	Athletics (track and field)
5	1948	Winter	Felix Endrich	Bobsleigh
6	1948	Summer	Armin Scheurer	Athletics (track and field)
7	1952	Winter	Ulrich Poltera	Ice hockey
8	1952	Summer	Walter Lehmann	Artistic gymnastics
9	1956	Winter	Georges Schneider	Alpine skiing
10	1960	Winter	Andreas Däscher	Ski jumping
11	1960	Summer	August Hollenstein	Shooting
12	1964	Winter	Hans Ammann	Cross-country skiing
13	1964	Summer	Peter Laeng	Athletics
14	1968	Winter	Alois Kälin	Nordic combined
15	1968	Summer	Paul Weier	Equestrianism
16	1972	Winter	Edy Bruggmann	Alpine skiing
17	1972	Summer	Urs von Wartburg	Athletics (track and field)
18	1976	Winter	Werner Carmichel	Bobsleigh
19	1976	Summer	Christian Kauter	Fencing
20	1980	Winter	Marie-Theres Nadig	Alpine skiing
21	1984	Winter	Erika Hess	Alpine skiing
22	1984	Summer	Christine Stückelberger	Equestrianism
23	1988	Winter	Michela Figini	Alpine skiing
24	1988	Summer	Cornelia Bürki	Athletics (track and field)
25	1992	Winter	Vreni Schneider	Alpine skiing
26	1992	Summer	Daniel Giubellini	Gymnastics
27	1994	Winter	Gustav Weder	Bobsleigh
28	1996	Summer	Stefan Schärer	Handball
29	1998	Winter	Guido Acklin	Bobsleigh
30	2000	Summer	Thomas Frischknecht	Mountain biking
31	2002	Winter	Gian Simmen	Snowboarding
32	2004	Summer	Roger Federer	Tennis
33	2006	Winter	Philipp Schoch	Snowboarding
34	2008	Summer	Roger Federer	Tennis
35	2010	Winter	Stéphane Lambiel	Figure skating
36	2012	Summer	Stanislas Wawrinka	Tennis
37	2014	Winter	Simon Ammann	Ski jumping
38	2016	Summer	Giulia Steingruber	Gymnastics
39	2018	Winter	Dario Cologna	Cross country skiing
40	2020	Summer	Max Heinzer	Fencing
40	2020	Summer	Mujinga Kambundji	Athletics (track and field)
41	2022	Winter	Andres Ambühl	Ice hockey
41	2022	Winter	Wendy Holdener	Alpine skiing
42	2024	Summer	Nina Christen	Shooting sports
42	2024	Summer	Nino Schurter	Mountain biking

== See also ==
- Switzerland at the Olympics
