= John C. Porter =

John C. Porter may refer to:

- John Clinton Porter (1871–1959), U.S. political figure and Mayor of Los Angeles
- John Porter (ice hockey) (1904–1997), Canadian ice hockey player
