= FIBT World Championships 1930 =

Winter sport competition

1930 World Championships
- Location: Montreux, Switzerland

The FIBT World Championships 1930 took place in Montreux, Switzerland at the Caux-sur-Montreux hotel. A four-man competition was held.

== Four man bobsleigh ==
Pos	Team	Time
Gold	Italy (Franco Zaninetta, Giorgio Biasini, Antonio Dorini, Gino Rossi)	
Silver	Switzerland (Jean Moillen, John Schneiter, André Moillen, William Pichard)	
Bronze	Germany (Fritz Grau, Picker, Bertram, Albert Brehme)	

== Medal table ==
Rank	Nation	Gold	Silver	Bronze	Total
1	Italy (ITA)	1	0	0	1
2	Switzerland (SUI)	0	1	0	1
3	Germany (GER)	0	0	1	1
Totals (3 entries)		1	1	1	3
