= Franco Zaninetta =

Italian bobsledder

Medal record

Bobsleigh

World Championships
Gold medal – first place	1930 Caux-sur-Montreux	Four-man

Franco Zaninetta was an Italian bobsledder who competed in the late 1920s and early 1930s. He won a gold medal in the four-man event at the first FIBT World Championships in Montreux, Switzerland at the Caux-sur-Montreux hotel in 1930.
