= Bob Copp =

Canadian ice hockey player

- Born: November 15, 1918; Port Elgin, New Brunswick, Canada
- Died: December 12, 2006 (aged 88); Ottawa, Ontario, Canada
- Height: 5 ft 11 in (180 cm)
- Weight: 180 lb (82 kg; 12 st 12 lb)
- Position: Defence
- Shot: Left
- Played for: Toronto Maple Leafs
- Playing career: 1940–1955

Robert Alonzo "Bobby" Copp (November 15, 1918 – December 12, 2006) was a Canadian ice hockey defenceman. He played 30 games in the National Hockey League for the Toronto Maple Leafs between 1942 and 1950. The rest of his career, which lasted from 1940 to 1955, was spent in the minor leagues.

== Career statistics ==
=== Regular season and playoffs ===
			Regular season					Playoffs
Season	Team	League	GP	G	A	Pts	PIM	GP	G	A	Pts	PIM
1934–35	Mount Allison University	MIAA	3	0	1	1	2	—	—	—	—	—
1935–36	Mount Allison University	MIAA	6	3	3	6	0	—	—	—	—	—
1936–37	Mount Allison University	MIAA	4	3	4	7	6	1	0	0	0	0
1936–37	Amherst St. Pats	M-Cup	—	—	—	—	—	8	10	5	15	6
1937–38	Mount Allison University	MIAA	4	2	7	9	2	1	1	1	2	0
1938–39	University of Toronto	IIL	9	2	2	4	0	—	—	—	—	—
1939–40	University of Toronto	IIL	8	6	6	12	10	—	—	—	—	—
1940–41	Toronto Marlboros	OHA Sr	31	4	2	6	19	11	4	2	6	6
1940–41	Toronto RCAF	TMHL	1	0	1	1	0	—	—	—	—	—
1940–41	Toronto Marlboros	Al-Cup	—	—	—	—	—	6	0	2	2	2
1941–42	Toronto Marlboros	OHA Sr	28	7	11	18	21	6	0	0	0	4
1942–43	Toronto Maple Leafs	NHL	28	3	9	12	24	—	—	—	—	—
1942–43	Halifax RCAF	NSDHL	—	—	—	—	—	7	1	3	4	0
1943–44	Ottawa Commanders	OCHL	2	2	1	3	2	—	—	—	—	—
1945–46	Ottawa Senators	QSHL	35	11	19	30	46	5	0	1	1	4
1945–46	Ottawa RCAF Flyers	OCHL	—	—	—	—	—	3	0	1	1	0
1946–47	Ottawa Senators	QSHL	28	2	8	10	32	11	1	1	2	8
1947–48	Ottawa Senators	QSHL	48	10	21	31	16	12	2	5	7	4
1947–48	Ottawa Senators	Al-Cup	—	—	—	—	—	14	5	7	12	20
1948–49	Ottawa Senators	QSHL	60	21	34	55	15	11	1	3	4	6
1948–49	Ottawa Senators	Al-Cup	—	—	—	—	—	12	0	6	6	4
1949–50	Ottawa Senators	QSHL	45	9	12	21	15	7	1	0	1	4
1950–51	Toronto Maple Leafs	NHL	2	0	0	0	2	—	—	—	—	—
1950–51	Ottawa Senators	QSHL	54	7	8	15	16	11	0	1	1	6
1951–52	Ottawa Senators	QSHL	4	0	0	0	0	—	—	—	—	—
1952–53	Ottawa Senators	QSHL	14	1	1	2	0	9	1	0	1	0
1952–53	Smiths Falls Rideaus	EOHL	32	1	14	15	6	—	—	—	—	—
1953–54	Ottawa Senators	QSHL	42	0	5	5	8	21	0	1	1	6
1954–55	Ottawa Senators	QSHL	27	0	4	4	6	—	—	—	—	—
QSHL totals			357	61	122	183	154	87	6	12	18	38
NHL totals			30	3	9	12	26	—	—	—	—	—
