= Toronto Varsity Blues men's ice hockey =

Men's ice hockey team of the University of Toronto

- University: University of Toronto
- Conference: OUA; OUA West Division
- First season: 1891
- Head coach: Ryan Medel; Since 2017–18 season
- Arena: Varsity Arena
- Colors: U of T Blue and white
- Fight song: "The Blue and White"
- Mascot: True Blue

U Sports tournament champions
- 1966, 1967, 1969, 1970, 1971, 1972, 1973, 1976, 1977, 1984

U Sports tournament appearances
- 1966, 1967, 1968, 1969, 1970, 1971, 1972, 1973, 1975, 1976, 1977, 1978, 1982, 1983, 1984, 1985, 1993

Conference tournament champions
- 1906–07, 1907–08, 1910–11, 1912–13, 1914–15, 1919–20, 1921–22, 1922–23, 1923–24, 1924–25, 1925–26, 1927–28, 1928–29, 1931–32, 1939–40, 1946–47, 1947–48, 1950–51, 1954–55, 1955–56, 1956–57, 1957–58, 1958–59, 1961–62, 1963–64, 1965–66, 1966–67, 1967–68, 1968–69, 1969–70, 1970–71, 1971–72, 1972–73, 1974–75, 1976–77, 1977–78, 1981–82, 1983–84, 1992–93

The Toronto Varsity Blues men's ice hockey team is an ice hockey team operated by the Varsity Blues athletics program of the University of Toronto. They are members of the Ontario University Athletics conference and compete in U Sports. The Varsity Blues senior team won the Allan Cup in 1921 and 1927, and won the gold medal for Canada at the 1928 Winter Olympics. The team is based at Varsity Arena on the University downtown campus in Toronto, Ontario.

The Varsity Blues have won 39 conference titles in the OUA; and 10 U Sports championships in 1965–66, 1966–67, 1968–69, 1969–70, 1970–71, 1971–72, 1972–73, 1975–76, 1976–77 and 1983–84.

== History ==
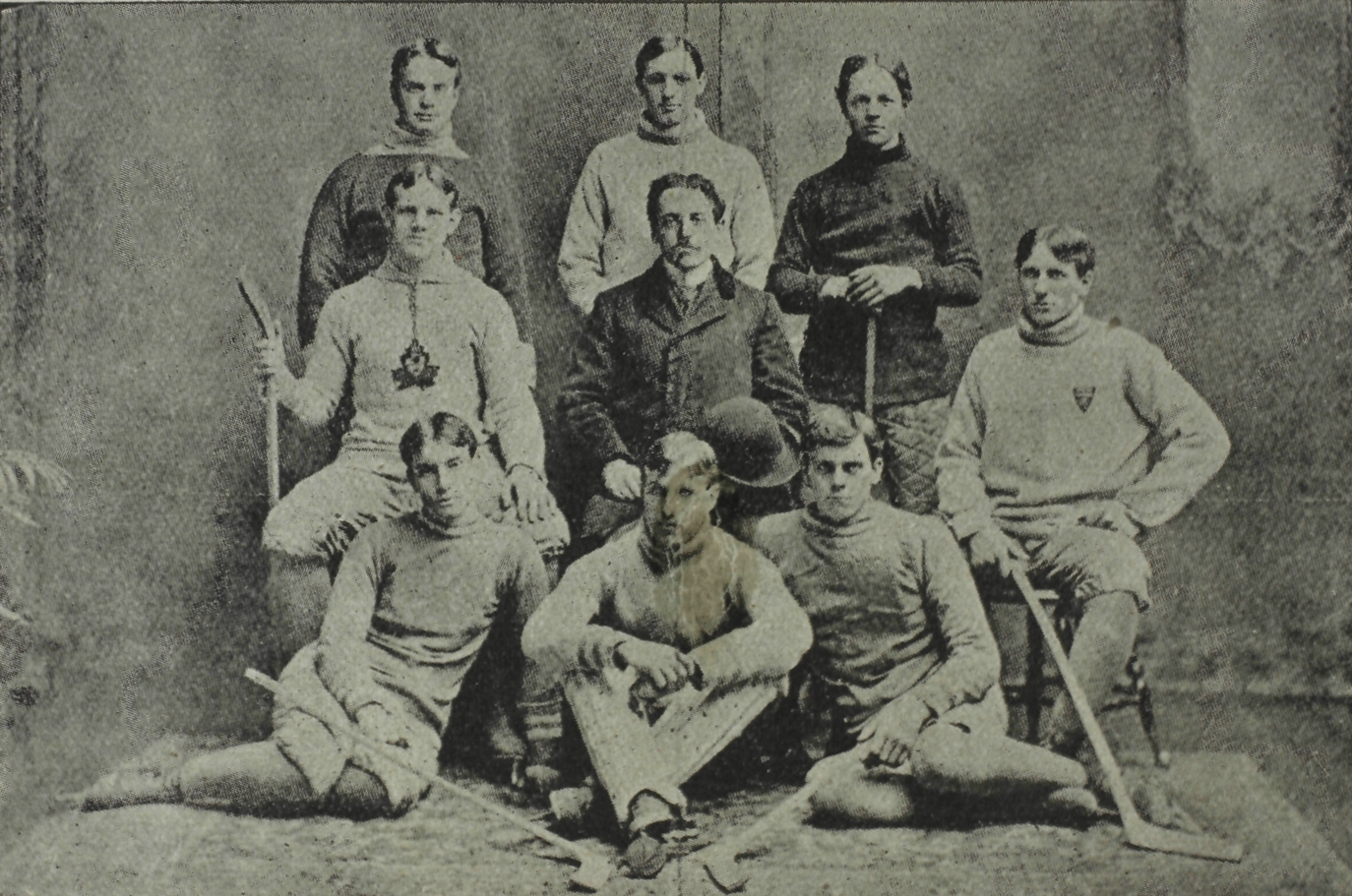
Team picture, 1899.

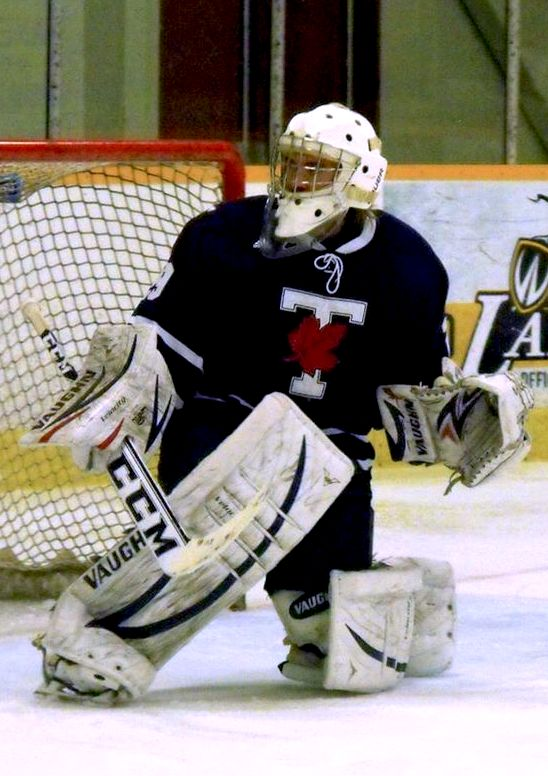
Blues goalie during 2013-14 season.

The Varsity Blues were founded in 1891, and are the longest continuously operated ice hockey program in the city of Toronto. The program currently includes only players enrolled at the University, however the Varsity Blues have historically had a junior ice hockey team for students, and a senior ice hockey team for graduates.

Notable coaches of the Varsity Blues include Conn Smythe, Ace Bailey, Tom Watt, and Mike Keenan, and Lester Bowles Pearson later Nobel Peace Prize recipient and Prime Minister of Canada.

David Bauer played for the Varsity Blues during the 1945–46 season, before becoming a Basilian priest and then founding the Canada men's national ice hockey team in 1963.

== Senior team ==
The Varsity Blues graduates were a successful OHA Senior A League team in the 1920s and 1930s. They won the J. Ross Robertson Cup as league champions in 1921, 1927, 1929, and 1930. Toronto also became Canadian national champions with their victories at the 1921 Allan Cup and the 1927 Allan Cup.

During the 1920 Allan Cup playoffs, Canadian Amateur Hockey Association (CAHA) president Frederick E. Betts expressed concerns that the Varsity Blues team had violated the rules by participating in both the Ontario Hockey Association (OHA) and the Canadian Interuniversity Athletics Union (CIAU) playoffs. At the 1920 general meeting, the CAHA debated the issue and decided that the team was eligible for the Allan Cup.

=== 1928 Winter Olympics ===
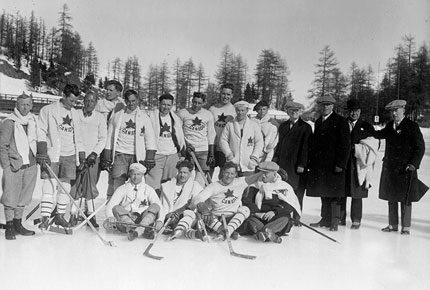
1928 Olympic Gold Medal-winning Canadian men's ice hockey team

The University of Toronto Graduates as the 1927 Allan Cup champions were chosen to represent the Canada men's national team in ice hockey at the 1928 Winter Olympics. Conn Smythe coached the team during the OHA season, but refused to go to the Olympics due to disagreements on which players were added to the team by the Canadian Olympic Committee. The Graduates went without Smythe, led by team captain Red Porter, and Olympic Committee member W. A. Hewitt, who oversaw the team's finances. The format of the Olympics hockey tournament saw the Canadians receive a bye into the second round, without any games in the first week. Despite the wait to play, the Graduates won all three games by scoring 38 goals and conceding none, to win the gold medal.

1928 Olympic roster:

- Charles Delahaye
- Franklyn Fisher
- Louis Hudson
- Herbert Plaxton
- Hugh Plaxton
- Roger Plaxton
- John Primeau
- Frank Sullivan
- Joseph Sullivan
- Ross Taylor
- Dave Trottier

Some sources show the names of Norbert Mueller and John Porter as being on the Olympic roster, but those two names are not listed in the "Official" Olympic Winter Games guide.

== Junior team ==
The Varsity Blues formerly operated a junior ice hockey team, that played in the OHA in the 1930s, but withdrew from the junior loop during the 1939–40 season. Former NHL players Hugh Plaxton, Dave Trottier and Dunc Munro all played for the Varsity Blues.

=== Season-by-season results ===
Season	Games	Won	Lost	Tied	Points	Winning Pct. (%)	Goals for	Goals against	Standing
1937–38	11	2	9	0	4	0.182	27	47	6th OHA
1938–39	14	1	10	3	5	0.179	27	63	4th Group 1
1939–40	17	1	16	0	2	0.059	39	108	6th OHA

== Season-by-season results ==
=== Senior and collegiate play ===
Note: GP = Games played, W = Wins, L = Losses, T = Ties, Pts = Points

U Sports Champion	U Sports Semifinalist	Conference regular season champions	Conference Division Champions	Conference Playoff Champions

Season	Conference	Regular Season											Conference Tournament Results	National Tournament Results
Season	Conference	Conference						Overall					Conference Tournament Results	National Tournament Results
Season	Conference	GP	W	L	T	Pts*	Finish	GP	W	L	T	%	Conference Tournament Results	National Tournament Results
Senior Hockey
1891–92	OHA	–	–	–	–	–	–	?	?	?	?	?	Won First Round, 2–6 (Toronto Athletics); Lost Second Round, 4–5 (Osgoode Hall)	
1892–93	OHA	12	7	5	0	14	?	?	?	?	?	?		
1893–94	OHA	4	2	2	0	4	T–6th	?	?	?	?	?		
1894–95	OHA	4	4	0	0	8	T–1st	?	?	?	?	?	Lost Semifinal, 5–19 (Queen's)	
1895–96	OHA	3	1	2	0	2	?	?	?	?	?	?		
1896–97	OHA	2	1	1	0	2	–	?	?	?	?	?	Won Semifinal series, 13–11 (Toronto Athletic Club); Lost Championship series, 7–12 (Queen's)	
1897–98	OHA	0	0	0	0	0	–	?	?	?	?	?	Lost Preliminary series, 16–17 (Osgoode Hall)	
1898–99	OHA	0	0	0	0	0	–	?	?	?	?	?	Won First Round series, 17–8 (Toronto Wellingtons); Won Second Round series, 12–8 (Stratford); Won Semifinal series, 16–13 (Peterborough); Lost Championship series, 8–19 (Queen's)	
1899–00	OHA	4	0	4	0	0	?	?	?	?	?	?		
1900–01	OHA	?	?	?	?	?	?	?	?	?	?	?	Lost Group 2 Final series, 1–2 (Toronto Wellingtons)	
1901–02	OHA	4	1	3	0	2	?	?	?	?	?	?		
Senior and Collegiate Hockey
1902–03	CIAU	4	1	2	1	3	3rd	?	?	?	?	?		
1903–04	CIAU	4	2	2	0	4	2nd	?	?	?	?	?		
1904–05	CIAU	4	1	3	0	2	3rd	?	?	?	?	?		
1905–06	CIAU	4	1	3	0	2	3rd	?	?	?	?	?		
1906–07	CIAU	4	3	1	0	6	1st	?	?	?	?	?		
1907–08	CIAU	6	6	0	0	12	1st	?	?	?	?	?		
1908–09	CIAU	6	3	2	1	7	2nd	?	?	?	?	?		
W. E. Gallie (1909–1913)
1909–10	CIAU	6	4	2	0	8	T–1st	?	?	?	?	?	Lost Semifinal, withdrew (McGill)	
1910–11	CIAU	4	3	1	0	6	1st	?	?	?	?	?	Won Championship series, 6–2 (Laval–Montreal)	
1911–12	CIAU	4	2	2	0	4	2nd	?	?	?	?	?		
Roy Thomas (1913–1915)
1912–13	CIAU	4	3	1	0	6	1st	?	?	?	?	?		
1913–14	CIAU	4	2	2	0	4	2nd	?	?	?	?	?		
1914–15	CIAU	4	4	0	0	8	1st	?	?	?	?	?		
Program suspended due to World War I
Senior and Intercollegiate Hockey
Frank Carroll (1919–1920)
1919–20	CIAU	4	3	1	0	6	T–1st	?	?	?	?	?	Won Championship, 5–4 (McGill)	Won Allan Cup Eastern Semifinal series, 18–7 (Quebec Sons of Ireland); Won Allan Cup Eastern Final series, 6–5 (Sudbury Wolves); Lost Allan Cup Championship series, 5–11 (Winnipeg Falcons)
W. A. Dafoe (1920–1922)
1920–21	CIAU	4	4	0	0	8	1st	?	?	?	?	?		Won Allan Cup Eastern Semifinal series, 18–5 (Sault Ste. Marie Greyhounds); Won Allan Cup Eastern Final, 11–0 (McGill); Won Allan Cup Championship series, 8–3 (Brandon Wheat City Hockey Club)
1921–22	CIAU	4	4	0	0	8	1st	?	?	?	?	?		
Beattie Ramsay (1922–1923)
1922–23	CIAU	6	5	1	0	10	1st	?	?	?	?	?		
Conn Smythe (1923–1926)
1923–24	CIAU	6	5	1	0	10	1st	?	?	?	?	?		
1924–25	CIAU	5	5	0	0	10	1st	?	?	?	?	?		Won Allan Cup Eastern Semifinal series, 8–5 (Ottawa Montagnards); Won Allan Cup Eastern Final series, 8–2 (Niagara Falls Cataracts); Lost Allan Cup Championship series, 0–2 (Port Arthur Bearcats)
1925–26	CIAU	6	6	0	0	12	1st	?	?	?	?	?		Won Allan Cup Eastern Semifinal series, 8–5 (Peterborough); Won Allan Cup Eastern Final series, 8–4 ( Ottawa Gunners); Lost Allan Cup Championship series, 1–2–1 (Port Arthur Bearcats)
Lester B. Pearson (1926–1928)
1926–27	CIAU	6	5	1	0	10	T–1st	?	?	?	?	?	Won Championship series, 9–2 (McGill)	Tied Allan Cup Eastern Semifinal series, 3–3 (Ottawa New Edinburghs) no contest Allan Cup Eastern Final series, defaulted (Toronto Varsity Grads) ^{‡}
1927–28	CIAU	4	3	1	0	6	1st	?	?	?	?	?		
Red Porter (1928–1931)
1928–29	CIAU	0	0	0	0	0	–	?	?	?	?	?	Won Championship series, 9–3 (McGill)	
1929–30	CIAU	0	0	0	0	0	–	?	?	?	?	?	Lost Championship series, 2–3 (McGill)	
1930–31	CIAU	0	0	0	0	0	–	?	?	?	?	?	Lost Championship series, 4–6 (McGill)	
F. G. Sullivan (1931–1933)
1931–32	CIAU	0	0	0	0	0	–	?	?	?	?	?	Won Championship series, 4–3 (McGill)	
1932–33	CIAU	4	2	1	1	5	2nd	?	?	?	?	?		
Warren Stevens (1933–1935)
1933–34	CIAU	0	0	0	0	0	–	?	?	?	?	?	Lost Championship series, 4–9 (McGill)	
1934–35	CIAU	4	1	3	0	2	T–2nd	?	?	?	?	?		
Ace Bailey (1935–1940)
1935–36	CIAU	0	0	0	0	0	–	?	?	?	?	?	Lost Championship series, 3–15 (McGill)	
1936–37	CIAU	6	3	3	0	6	2nd	?	?	?	?	?		
1936–37	IIL ^{†}	10	6	4	0	12	3rd	?	?	?	?	?		
1937–38	CIAU	6	3	3	0	6	3rd	?	?	?	?	?		
1937–38	IIL	10	6	3	1	13	4th	?	?	?	?	?		
1938–39	CIAU	6	3	3	0	6	3rd	?	?	?	?	?		
1938–39	IIL	10	7	3	0	14	T–2nd	?	?	?	?	?		
1939–40	CIAU	4	4	0	0	8	1st	?	?	?	?	?		
1939–40	IIL	8	8	0	0	16	1st	?	?	?	?	?		
Program suspended due to World War II
Ace Bailey (1945–1949)
1945–46	CIAU	6	5	1	0	10	T–1st	?	?	?	?	?	Lost Championship, 1–4 (McGill)	
1946–47	CIAU	9	6	2	1	13	T–1st	?	?	?	?	?	Won Championship, 4–0 (McGill)	Tied International Championship, 2–2 (Dartmouth)
1947–48	CIAU	12	10	2	0	20	1st	?	?	?	?	?		Won International Championship, 5–0 (Dartmouth)
1948–49	CIAU	12	8	4	0	16	2nd	?	?	?	?	?		
Wally Halder (1949–1951)
1949–50	CIAU	12	9	3	0	18	2nd	?	?	?	?	?		
1950–51	CIAU	6	5	1	0	10	1st	?	?	?	?	?		
Bill Wade (1951–1953)
1951–52	CIAU	12	6	4	2	14	2nd	?	?	?	?	?		
1952–53	CIAU	12	3	7	2	8	4th	?	?	?	?	?		
Jack Kennedy (1953–1962)
1953–54	CIAU/QOAA ^{¿}	12	5	6	1	11	3rd	?	?	?	?	?		
Totals								GP	W	L	T	%	Championships	
Regular Season								?	?	?	?	?	20 CIAU Championships	
Conference Post-season								?	?	?	?	?	6 CIAU Championships	
Regular Season and Postseason Record								?	?	?	?	?	1 Allen Cup, 1 International Intercollegiate Championship	

† The International Intercollegiate League (IIL) was a joint venture between Canadian and American colleges.
‡ The Toronto Varsity team was made up of active students. Their opponent, referred to as the 'Toronto Varsity Grads', was a squad composed of alumni.
¿ Sometime between 1953 and 1955 the CIAU changed their name to QOAA (Quebec-Ontario Athletic Association).

=== Collegiate only ===
Note: GP = Games played, W = Wins, L = Losses, T = Ties, OTL = Overtime Losses, SOL = Shootout Losses, Pts = Points

U Sports Champion	U Sports Semifinalist	Conference regular season champions	Conference Division Champions	Conference Playoff Champions

Season	Conference	Regular Season													Conference Tournament Results	National Tournament Results
Season	Conference	Conference								Overall					Conference Tournament Results	National Tournament Results
Season	Conference	GP	W	L	T	OTL	SOL	Pts*	Finish	GP	W	L	T	%	Conference Tournament Results	National Tournament Results
Jack Kennedy (1953–1962)
1954–55	QOAA	12	11	0	1	–	–	23	1st	12	11	0	1	.958		
1955–56	QOAA	12	9	3	0	–	–	18	1st	12	9	3	0	.750		
1956–57	QOAA	12	9	3	0	–	–	18	1st	12	9	3	0	.750		
1957–58	QOAA	12	9	3	0	–	–	18	1st	12	9	3	0	.750		
1958–59	QOAA	12	10	2	0	–	–	20	1st	12	10	2	0	.750		
1959–60	QOAA	14	8	6	0	–	–	16	2nd	14	8	6	0	.571		
1960–61	QOAA	12	8	4	0	–	–	16	2nd	12	8	4	0	.667		
1961–62	QOAA	11	9	2	0	–	–	18	2nd	13	10	3	0	.769	Won Championship series, 13–10 (McMaster)	
Joe Kane (1962–1965)
1962–63	QOAA	12	8	4	0	–	–	16	3rd	12	8	4	0	.667		
1963–64	QOAA	12	9	1	2	–	–	20	1st	12	9	1	2	.833		Declined to participate
1964–65	QOAA	16	15	1	0	–	–	30	1st	17	15	2	0	.882	Lost Semifinal, 4–6 (Queen's)	
Tom Watt (1965–1979)
1965–66	QOAA	16	13	2	1	–	–	27	1st	19	16	2	1	.868		Won Quarterfinal, 9–7 (Sir George Williams); Won Semifinal, 6–4 (St. Francis Xavier); Won Championship, 8–1 (Alberta)
1966–67	QOAA	16	14	1	1	–	–	29	1st	20	18	1	1	.925	Won Semifinal, 10–1 (Queen's); Won Championship, 9–4 (Waterloo)	Won Semifinal, 9–7 (St. Francis Xavier); Won Championship, 16–2 (Laurentian)
1967–68	QOAA	16	14	1	1	–	–	29	1st	20	17	2	1	.875	Won Semifinal, 4–3 (Montreal); Won Championship, 8–1 (Waterloo)	Lost Semifinal, 0–1 (Loyola); Won Consolation Final, 5–3 (Laurentian)
1968–69	QOAA	15	13	1	1	–	–	27	1st	20	18	1	1	.925	Won Semifinal, 10–6 (Carleton); Won Championship, 4–0 (Waterloo)	Won Quarterfinal, 6–3 (Laurentian); Won Semifinal, 5–3 (Alberta); Won Championship, 4–2 (Sir George Williams)
1969–70	QOAA	15	12	1	2	–	–	26	1st	19	16	1	2	.895	Won Semifinal, 11–0 (Montreal); Won Championship, 7–4 (Waterloo)	Won Semifinal, 8–0 (Alberta); Won Championship, 3–2 (Saint Mary's)
1970–71	QOAA	15	12	3	0	–	–	24	2nd	19	16	3	0	.842	Won Semifinal, 6–5 (Carleton); Won Championship, 5–4 (Queen's)	Won Semifinal, 3–2 (British Columbia); Won Championship, 5–4 (Saint Mary's)
1971–72	OUAA	19	15	1	3	–	–	33	2nd	24	20	1	3	.896	Won Eastern Semifinal, 10–1 (Ottawa); Won Semifinal, 5–2 (Western Ontario); Won Championship, 6–2 (York)	Won Semifinal, 5–1 (Sir George Williams); Won Championship, 5–0 (Saint Mary's)
1972–73	OUAA	17	17	0	0	–	–	34	1st	23	23	0	0	1.000	Won Quarterfinal, 8–2 (York); Won Semifinal, 13–2 (Waterloo); Won Championship, 8–1 (Western Ontario)	Won Semifinal series, 2–0 (Alberta); Won Championship, 3–2 (Saint Mary's)
1973–74	OUAA	19	18	0	1	–	–	37	1st	21	19	1	1	.929	Won Quarterfinal, 8–2 (Queen's); Lost Semifinal, 4–6 (Western Ontario)	
1974–75	OUAA	14	9	4	1	–	–	19	6th	19	13	5	1	.711	Won Quarterfinal, 8–2 (Laurentian); Won Semifinal, 9–3 (Western Ontario); Won Championship, 4–3 (York)	Won Semifinal series, 2–1 (Saint Mary's); Lost Championship series, 1–2 (Alberta)
1975–76	OUAA	16	13	3	0	–	–	26	1st	21	16	5	0	.762	Won Quarterfinal, 2–1 (Queen's); Lost Semifinal, 5–6 (Guelph)	Lost First Round, 4–5 (Calgary); Won semifinal, 3–2 (Concordia); Won Championship, 7–2 (Guelph)
1976–77	OUAA	18	12	5	1	–	–	25	3rd	26	19	6	1	.750	Won Quarterfinal, 4–1 (Laurentian); Won Semifinal, 6–1 (Wilfrid Laurier); Won Championship, 3–2 (York)	Won Quarterfinal series, 2–0 (Manitoba); Won Semifinal series, 11–10 (British Columbia); Won Championship, 4–1 (Alberta)
1977–78	OUAA	20	18	1	1	–	–	37	1st	27	24	2	1	.907	Won Quarterfinal, 11–0 (Ryerson); Won Semifinal, 8–6 (York); Won Championship series, 2–0 (Wilfrid Laurier)	Won Group 2 Round-Robin, 7–3 (Concordia), 7–3 (Moncton); Lost Championship, 5–6 (Alberta)
1978–79	OUAA	16	11	2	3	–	–	25	2nd	17	11	3	3	.735	Lost Quarterfinal, 3–4 (OT) (McMaster)	
Gord Davies (1979–1981)
1979–80	OUAA	22	17	2	3	–	–	37	1st	25	18	4	3	.780	Lost Semifinal series, 1–2 (Guelph)	
1980–81	OUAA	22	15	6	1	–	–	31	3rd	25	16	8	1	.660	Won Quarterfinal, 8–4 (McMaster); Lost Semifinal series, 0–2 (Western Ontario)	
Bill Purcell (1981–1982)
1981–82	OUAA	22	18	0	4	–	–	40	1st	29	23	2	4	.862	Won Semifinal series, 2–0 (Wilfrid Laurier); Won Championship series, 2–1 (Guelph)	Lost Group 2 Round-Robin, 4–2 (Brandon), 3–8 (Moncton)
Gord Davies (1982–1983)
1982–83	OUAA	24	22	1	1	–	–	45	1st	30	25	4	1	.850	Won Semifinal series, 2–0 (Queen's); Lost Championship series, 0–2 (Wilfrid Laurier)	Lost Group 1 Round-Robin, 1–3 (Concordia), 6–4 (Moncton)
Mike Keenan (1983–1984)
1983–84	OUAA	24	20	1	3	–	–	43	1st	33	29	1	3	.924	Won Semifinal series, 2–0 (Guelph); Won Championship series, 2–0 (Western Ontario)	Won Quarterfinal series, 2–0 (New Brunswick); Won Semifinal series, 14–4 (Quebec–Trois-Rivières); Won Championship, 9–1 (Concordia)
Tom Watt (1984–1985)
1984–85	OUAA	24	19	2	3	–	–	41	1st	28	19	6	3	.732	Lost Semifinal series, 0–2 (York)	Lost Semifinal series, 0–2 (Alberta)
Paul Titanic (1985–1995)
1985–86	OUAA	24	19	5	0	–	–	38	2nd	27	20	7	0	.741	Lost Semifinal series, 1–2 (York)	
1986–87	OUAA	24	17	5	2	–	–	.750	T–3rd	26	17	7	2	.692	Lost Quarterfinal series, 0–2 (Windsor)	
1987–88	OUAA	26	8	13	5	–	–	21	T–12th	26	8	13	5	.404		
1988–89	OUAA	26	11	12	3	–	–	25	12th	26	11	12	3	.481		
1989–90	OUAA	22	10	12	0	–	–	20	T–10th	22	10	12	0	.455		
1990–91	OUAA	22	14	7	1	–	–	29	4th	27	17	9	1	.648	Won First Round, 4–3 (Ottawa); Won Quarterfinal series, 2–0 (Concordia); Lost Semifinal series, 0–2 (Quebec–Trois-Rivières)	
1991–92	OUAA	22	14	6	2	–	–	30	T–6th	28	17	9	2	.643	Won Quarterfinal series, 2–1 (McGill); Lost Semifinal series, 1–2 (Quebec–Trois-Rivières)	
1992–93	OUAA	22	15	6	1	–	–	31	T–5th	30	21	8	1	.717	Won Quarterfinal series, 2–1 (Queen's); Won Semifinal series, 2–0 (Ottawa); Won Championship, 5–4 (Guelph)	Won Semifinal, 3–2 (Guelph); Lost Championship, 1–12 (Acadia)
1993–94	OUAA	26	6	17	3	–	–	15	T–13th	29	7	19	3	.293	Won First Round, 4–1 (Queen's); Lost Quarterfinal series, 0–2 (Guelph)	
1994–95	OUAA	26	9	10	7	–	–	25	11th	29	10	12	7	.466	Won Division Semifinal, 5–4 (Queen's); Lost Division Final series, 0–2 (Guelph)	
Darren Lowe (1995–2017)
1995–96	OUAA	26	9	15	2	–	–	20	11th	30	11	17	2	.400	Won Division Semifinal, 5–2 (Royal Military College); Lost Division Final series, 1–2 (Guelph)	
1996–97	OUAA	26	14	10	2	–	–	30	T–6th	29	15	12	2	.552	Won First Round, 7–3 (Queen's); Lost Quarterfinal series, 0–2 (Guelph)	
1997–98	OUA	26	10	13	3	–	–	23	10th	31	12	16	3	.435	Won Division Semifinal series, 2–0 (Queen's); Lost Division Final series, 0–3 (Guelph)	
1998–99	OUA	26	6	16	4	–	–	16	13th	29	7	18	4	.310	Lost Division Semifinal series, 1–2 (Queen's)	
1999–00	OUA	26	10	13	3	–	–	23	9th	29	11	15	3	.431	Lost Division Semifinal series, 1–2 (Queen's)	
2000–01	OUA	24	13	10	1	–	–	27	5th	28	15	12	1	.554	Won Division Final series, 2–1 (Royal Military College); Lost Semifinal, 1–4 (Quebec–Trois-Rivières)	
2001–02	OUA	24	13	7	4	–	–	30	5th	27	15	8	4	.630	Won Division Final series, 2–0 (Ryerson); Lost Semifinal, 3–4 (OT) (Quebec–Trois-Rivières)	
2002–03	OUA	24	16	5	3	–	–	35	T–4th	28	18	7	3	.696	Won Division Final series, 2–1 (Queen's); Lost Semifinal, 3–6 (Quebec–Trois-Rivières)	
2003–04	OUA	24	9	10	4	1	–	23	10th	27	11	12	4	.481	Won Division Semifinal series, 2–0 (Queen's); Lost Division Final, 2–4 (Ottawa)	
2004–05	OUA	24	12	11	1	0	–	25	10th	26	12	13	1	.481	Lost Division Semifinal series, 0–2 (Quebec–Trois-Rivières)	
2005–06	OUA	24	8	13	2	1	–	19	T–11th	26	8	16	2	.346	Lost Division Semifinal series, 0–2 (Quebec–Trois-Rivières)	
2006–07	OUA	28	18	9	1	0	–	37	5th	32	20	11	1	.641	Won Division Semifinal series, 2–0 (McGill); Lost Division Final series, 0–2 (Quebec–Trois-Rivières)	
2007–08	OUA	28	13	13	–	0	2	28	11th	31	13	16	2	.452	Lost Division Quarterfinal series, 1–2 (Ottawa)	
2008–09	OUA	28	14	11	–	1	2	31	T–8th	30	14	14	2	.500	Lost Division Semifinal series, 0–2 (McGill)	
2009–10	OUA	28	15	9	–	2	2	34	7th	30	15	13	2	.533	Lost Division Quarterfinal series, 0–2 (Ryerson)	
2010–11	OUA	28	10	11	–	5	2	27	14th	31	11	18	2	.387	Lost Division Quarterfinal series, 1–2 (Carleton)	
2011–12	OUA	28	16	9	–	2	1	35	6th	31	17	13	1	.565	Lost Division Quarterfinal series, 1–2 (Carleton)	
2012–13	OUA	28	13	9	–	3	3	32	9th	31	14	14	3	.500	Lost Division Quarterfinal series, 1–2 (Ottawa)	
2013–14	OUA	28	15	11	–	1	1	32	T–10th	31	16	14	1	.532	Lost Division Quarterfinal series, 1–2 (Windsor)	
2014–15	OUA	27	13	13	–	1	0	27	T–9th	32	16	16	0	.500	Won Division Quarterfinal series, 2–0 (Ryerson); Lost Division Semifinal series, 1–2 (Guelph)	
2015–16	OUA	28	11	15	–	2	0	24	15th	33	14	19	0	.424	Won Division Quarterfinal series, 2–0 (York); Lost Division Semifinal series, 1–2 (Western Ontario)	
2016–17	OUA	28	5	21	–	0	2	12	20th	28	5	21	2	.214		
Ryan Medel (2017–Present)
2017–18	OUA	28	11	16	–	1	0	23	15th	28	11	17	0	.393		
2018–19	OUA	28	11	13	–	3	1	26	T–14th	30	11	18	1	.383	Lost Division Quarterfinal series, 0–2 (Ryerson)	
2019–20	OUA	28	21	5	–	2	0	44	2nd	31	22	9	0	.710	Lost Division Semifinal series, 1–2 (Western Ontario)	
2020–21	Season cancelled due to COVID-19 pandemic															
2021–22	OUA	17	9	6	–	2	0	.588	6th	18	9	9	0	.500	Lost First Round, 1–4 (Waterloo)	
2022–23	OUA	27	14	10	–	3	0	31	T–8th	33	17	16	0	.515	Won Division Quarterfinal series, 2–1 (Toronto Metropolitan); Lost Division Semifinal series, 1–2 (Lakehead)	
2023–24	OUA	28	17	10	–	1	0	35	8th	30	17	13	0	.567	Lost Division Quarterfinal series, 0–2 (Wilfrid Laurier)	
Totals										GP	W	L	T/SOL	%	Championships	
Regular Season										1484	876	504	104	.625	6 Mid East Division Titles, 6 East Division Titles, 3 West Division Titles, 12 QOAA Championships, 9 OUAA Championships	
Conference Post-season										165	86	79	0	.518	6 QOAA Championships, 8 OUAA Championships	
U Sports Postseason										46	35	11	0	.761	17 National tournament appearances	
Regular Season and Postseason Record										1695	997	594	104	.619	10 National Championships	

Note: Totals include results from 1954–55 onward.

== NHL alumni ==
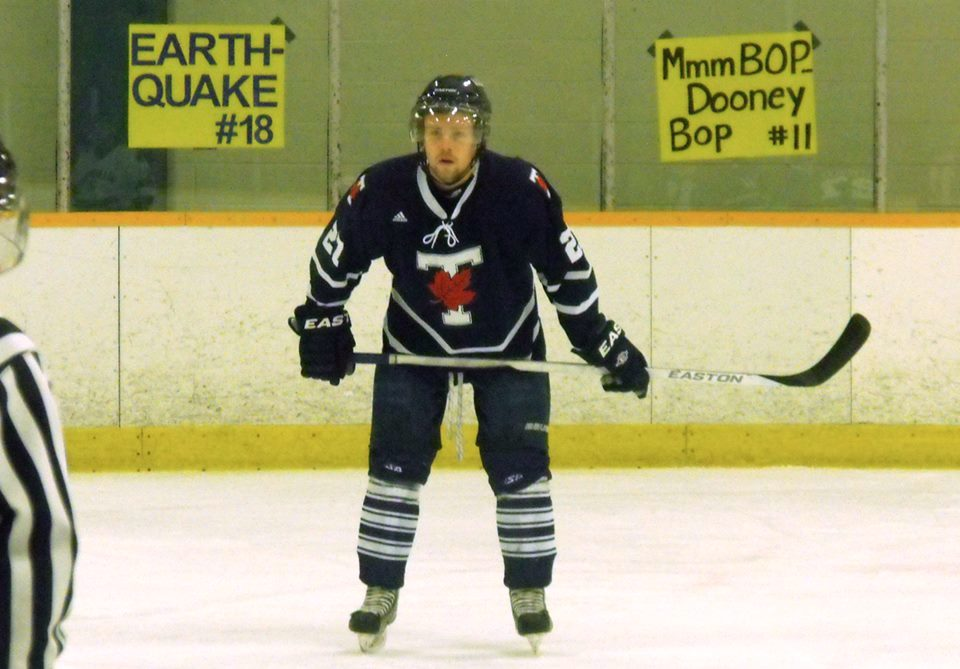
Blues player in 2013-14 season.

List of National Hockey League alumni involved with the Varsity Blues. (seasons in parentheses)

- Mike Boland (1967–71)
- Darren Boyko (1983–85)
- Stan Brown (1920–22)
- Bill Carson (1919–23)
- Bob Copp (1938–40)
- Nelson Debenedet (1969–71)
- Ken Duggan (1982–86)
- Andre Hidi (1980–84)
- Larry Hopkins (1973–78)
- Brent Imlach (1970–71)
- Gary Inness (1972–73)
- Don Keenan (1959–60)
- Paul Knox (1954–55)
- Ed Kryzanowski (1945–48)
- Alex Levinsky (1929–30)
- Darren Lowe (1979–83,1984–86)
- Charlie Luksa (1973–74)
- Hank Monteith (1962–67)
- Hugh Plaxton (1921–28)
- Beattie Ramsay (1919–23)
- Dave Reid (1954–56)
- Kent Ruhnke (1971–76)
- Don Smillie (1929–33)
- Dave Tataryn (1971–72)
- John Wright (1968–72)

== Sources ==
- Podnieks, Andrew (1997). Canada's Olympic Hockey Teams: The Complete History 1920–1998. Toronto, Ontario: Doubleday Canada. ISBN 0-385-25688-4.

Preceded by Toronto Granites	Canada men's Olympic ice hockey team 1928	Succeeded by Winnipeg Hockey Club
