= Fritz Grau =

German bobsledder (1894–1945)

Personal information
- Nationality: German
- Born: 8 November 1894 Friedrichshagen, German Empire
- Died: 5 July 1945 (aged 50) Poznań, Poland

Sport
- Sport: Bobsleigh
Medal record
Bobsleigh
World Championships
Bronze medal – third place	1930 Caux-sur-Montreux	Two-man
Bronze medal – third place	1933 Schreiberhau	Two-man

Fritz Grau (8 November 1894 – 5 July 1945) was a German bobsledder who competed in the 1930s. He won two bronze medals at the FIBT World Championships (two-man: 1933, four-man: 1930). Grau was seriously injured, along with teammates Albert Brehme and Helmut Hopnaann, shortly before the 1932 Winter Olympics. He also finished sixth in the two-man event at the 1936 Winter Olympics in Garmisch-Partenkirchen.
