= Giannin Andreossi =

Swiss ice hockey player (1902–1964)

Olympic medal record

Men's Ice hockey
Bronze medal – third place	1928 St. Moritz	Team competition

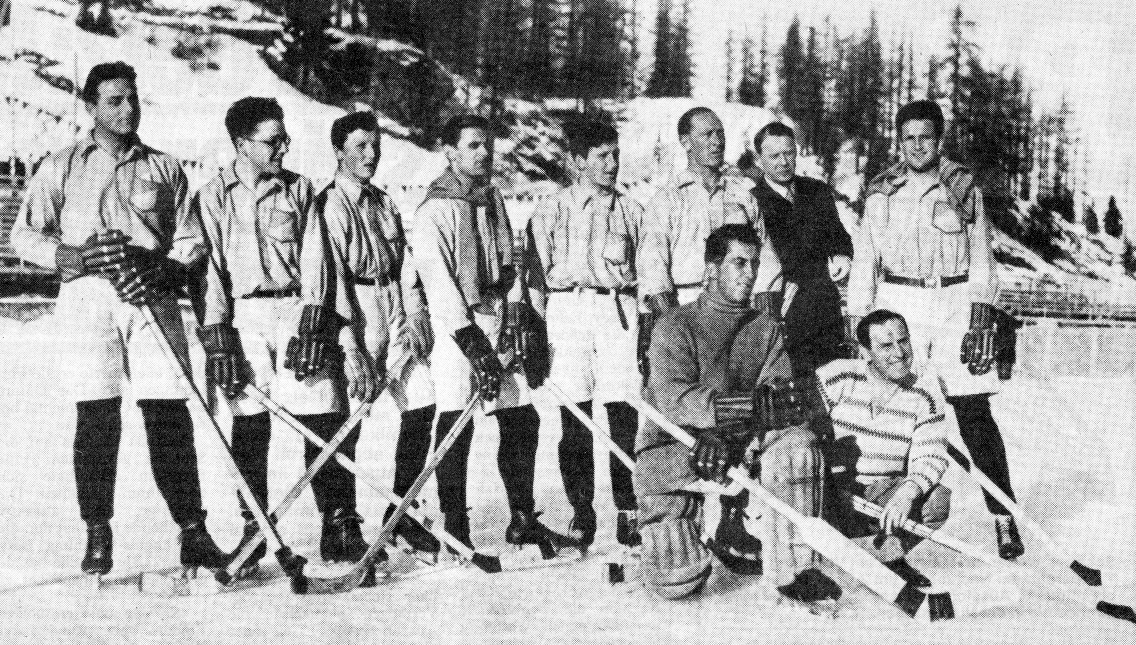
Team of the EHC St. Moritz of 1928, Swiss champion 1928 - from left: Noldi Garmann, Bobby Breiter, Bibi Torriani, Gian Andreossi, Conrad Torriani, Mezzi Andreossi, a functionary, Oscar Schmidt; kneeling: Arnold Martignoni, Sam Pierce

Giannino Andreossi (2 July 1902 – 22 May 1964) was a Swiss ice hockey player who competed in the 1928 Winter Olympics. He was a member of the Swiss ice hockey team, which won the bronze medal.
