= Brent Imlach =

Canadian ice hockey player

- Born: November 16, 1946 Quebec City, Quebec, Canada
- Died: March 28, 2017 (aged 70)
- Height: 5 ft 8 in (173 cm)
- Weight: 160 lb (73 kg; 11 st 6 lb)
- Position: Forward
- Shot: Left
- Played for: Toronto Maple Leafs
- Playing career: 1966–1966

Brent Imlach (November 16, 1946 – March 28, 2017) was a Canadian professional ice hockey player, and a son of Punch Imlach. He played three games with the Toronto Maple Leafs during the 1965–66 and 1966–67 seasons. He was a graduate of Cedarbrae Collegiate Institute.

== Life and career ==
After his professional hockey career, Imlach then enrolled at University of Western Ontario's (UWO) Ivey Business School and played with UWO's OQAA team for two seasons. After graduating with an HBA in 1970, he rejected a contract from the Maple Leafs because he thought the contract was not generous enough and his signing rights were traded to the Buffalo Sabres in 1970, although he never played a game with the Sabres. He continued his college hockey career with the University of Toronto and York University. He graduated from York with a Masters in business administration.

Imlach went on to work for Molson Breweries as a director of advertising, and ran the Vancouver Canadians as general manager (GM) from 1989 to 1997. As GM, he won the Pacific Coast League Executive of the Year award in 1993. He died in March 2017.

== Career statistics ==
=== Regular season and playoffs ===
| | | | Regular season | | | | | Playoffs |
| Season | Team | League | GP | G | A | Pts | PIM | GP | G | A | Pts | PIM |
|---|---|---|---|---|---|---|---|---|---|---|---|---|
| 1964–65 | Toronto Marlboros | OHA | 4 | 0 | 0 | 0 | 0 | — | — | — | — | — |
| 1965–66 | Toronto Maple Leafs | NHL | 2 | 0 | 0 | 0 | 0 | — | — | — | — | — |
| 1965–66 | Rochester Americans | AHL | 1 | 0 | 0 | 0 | 2 | — | — | — | — | — |
| 1965–66 | Toronto Marlboros | OHA | 45 | 23 | 18 | 41 | 15 | 14 | 0 | 5 | 5 | 4 |
| 1966–67 | Toronto Maple Leafs | NHL | 1 | 0 | 0 | 0 | 0 | — | — | — | — | — |
| 1966–67 | London Nationals | WOHL | 46 | 3 | 15 | 18 | 10 | — | — | — | — | — |
| 1967–68 | University of Western Ontario | OQAA | 15 | 11 | 15 | 26 | 9 | — | — | — | — | — |
| 1968–69 | University of Western Ontario | OQAA | 15 | 14 | 20 | 34 | 8 | — | — | — | — | — |
| 1969–70 | University of Western Ontario | OQAA | 15 | 3 | 10 | 13 | 8 | — | — | — | — | — |
| 1970–71 | University of Toronto | OUAA | 15 | 0 | 5 | 5 | 4 | — | — | — | — | — |
| 1971–72 | York University | OUAA | 20 | 16 | 22 | 38 | 28 | — | — | — | — | — |
| NHL totals | | | 3 | 0 | 0 | 0 | 0 | — | — | — | — | — |
