= Albert Brehme =

German bobsledder

Medal record

Men's Bobsleigh

Representing the (Germany) Weimar Republic

World Championships
Bronze medal – third place	1930 Caux-sur-Montreux	Four-man
Bronze medal – third place	1933 Schreiberhau	Two-man

Albert Brehme (19 June 1903 – 21 June 1971) was a German bobsledder who competed in the 1930s. He won two bronze medals at the FIBT World Championships (Two-man: 1933, Four-man: 1930). He was born in Berlin.

Brehme was seriously injured, along with teammates Fritz Grau and Helmut Hopnaann, shortly before the 1932 Winter Olympics. He also finished sixth in the two-man event at the 1936 Winter Olympics in Garmisch-Partenkirchen.
