= Grant Gordon =

Canadian ice hockey player (1900–1954)

Personal information
- Full name: Rowan Grant Gordon
- Born: October 13, 1900 Pembroke, Ontario, Canada
- Died: March 20, 1954 (aged 53) Toronto, Ontario, Canada

Sport
- Country: Canada
- Sport: Ice hockey
Medal record
Men's ice hockey
Representing Canada
Olympic Games
Gold medal – first place	1928 St. Moritz	Team competition

Rowan Grant Gordon (October 13, 1900 – March 20, 1954) was a Canadian ice hockey player who competed in the 1928 Winter Olympics. He was born in Pembroke, Ontario.

In 1928, he was a member of the University of Toronto Grads, the Canadian team which won the gold medal. He later worked as a lawyer until his death in 1954.
