= FIBT World Championships 1933 =

Winter sport competition

1933 World Championships
- Location: Oberhof, Germany

The FIBT World Championships 1933 took place in Schreiberhau, Germany (now Szklarska Poręba, Poland) with only the Two-man event being held. The Four-man event was not held.

== Two man bobsleigh ==
Pos	Team	Time
Gold	Romania (Alexandru Papana, Dumitru Hubert)	
Silver	Czechoslovakia (Brüme, Heinzel)	
Bronze	Germany (Fritz Grau, Albert Brehme)	

== Four man bobsleigh ==
Not held.

== Medal table ==
Rank	Nation	Gold	Silver	Bronze	Total
1	Romania (ROU)	1	0	0	1
2	Czechoslovakia (TCH)	0	1	0	1
3	Germany (GER)	0	0	1	1
Totals (3 entries)		1	1	1	3
