= Molliens =

Molliens may refer to:

== Places ==
- Canton of Molliens-Dreuil, a former canton situated in the Somme department in northern France.
- Molliens-au-Bois, a commune in the Somme department in the Hauts-de-France region in northern France
- Molliens-Dreuil, a commune in the Somme department in northern France.

== People ==
- Stéphane Molliens (born 1974), a French para table tennis player
