= Louis Dufour Sr. =

Swiss ice hockey player (1873–1944)

Personal information
- Nationality: Swiss
- Born: 1873
- Died: 12 April 1944 (aged 69–70)

Sport
- Sport: Ice hockey

Louis Dufour Sr. (1873 – 12 April 1944) was a Swiss ice hockey player. He competed in the men's tournament at the 1920 Summer Olympics, along with his son Louis Dufour Jr. Dufour was also a co-founder of the Swiss Ice Hockey Association.

Considered one of the fathers of sports in Switzerland, he is credited with playing a major role in introducing ice hockey and tennis to the country. In addition to founding the Swiss Ice Hockey Association, he also organized some of the earliest international tournaments and the first Ice Hockey European Championships in 1910.
