= Dave Trottier =

Canadian ice hockey player

- Born: June 25, 1906 Pembroke, Ontario, Canada
- Died: November 14, 1956 (aged 50) Halifax, Nova Scotia, Canada
- Height: 5 ft 10 in (178 cm)
- Weight: 170 lb (77 kg; 12 st 2 lb)
- Position: Left wing
- Shot: Left
- Played for: Montreal Maroons; Detroit Red Wings
- National team: Canada
- Playing career: 1928–1939

Olympic medal record

Men's ice hockey

Representing Canada

Olympic Games
Gold medal – first place	1928 St. Moritz	Team competition

David Thomas Trottier (June 25, 1906 – November 14, 1956) was a Canadian professional ice hockey player who played in the 1928 Olympic Games, winning a gold medal, and played in the National Hockey League for 11 seasons. He won the Stanley Cup in 1935 with the Montreal Maroons and was the Maroons' leading scorer in the 1931–32 NHL season. He was born in Pembroke, Ontario.

== Career statistics ==
=== Regular season and playoffs ===
			Regular season					Playoffs
Season	Team	League	GP	G	A	Pts	PIM	GP	G	A	Pts	PIM
1923–24	Toronto St. Michael's Majors	OHA-Jr.	6	13	2	15	—	—	—	—	—	—
1924–25	Toronto St. Michael's Majors	OHA-Jr.	6	7	7	14	—	1	1	1	2	0
1925–26	Toronto Varsity Grads	OHA-Sr.	—	—	—	—	—	—	—	—	—	—
1926–27	Toronto Varsity Grads	OHA-Sr.	11	23	8	31	7	2	1	0	1	2
1926–27	Toronto Varsity Grads	Al-Cup	—	—	—	—	—	12	9	7	16	32
1927–28	Toronto Varsity Grads	Exhib.	12	33	10	43	—	—	—	—	—	—
1928–29	Montreal Maroons	NHL	37	2	4	6	69	—	—	—	—	—
1928–29	Montreal Victorias	MCHL	2	0	0	0	0	—	—	—	—	—
1929–30	Montreal Maroons	NHL	41	17	10	27	73	4	0	2	2	8
1930–31	Montreal Maroons	NHL	43	9	8	17	58	2	0	0	0	6
1931–32	Montreal Maroons	NHL	48	26	18	44	94	4	1	0	1	0
1932–33	Montreal Maroons	NHL	48	16	15	31	38	2	0	0	0	6
1933–34	Montreal Maroons	NHL	48	9	17	26	47	4	0	0	0	6
1934–35	Montreal Maroons	NHL	34	10	9	19	22	7	2	1	3	4
1935–36	Montreal Maroons	NHL	46	10	10	20	25	3	0	0	0	4
1936–37	Montreal Maroons	NHL	43	12	11	23	33	5	1	0	1	5
1937–38	Montreal Maroons	NHL	47	9	10	19	42	—	—	—	—	—
1938–39	Detroit Red Wings	NHL	11	1	1	2	16	—	—	—	—	—
1938–39	Pittsburgh Hornets	IAHL	10	5	3	8	6	—	—	—	—	—
NHL totals			446	121	113	234	517	31	4	3	7	39

=== International ===
Year	Team	Event	GP	G	A	Pts	PIM
1928	Canada	OLY	3	12	3	15	—
