= Hans Eidenbenz =

Hans Eidenbenz (January 30, 1900 – August 29, 1987) was a Swiss Nordic combined skier who competed in the 1920s. Competing in two Winter Olympics, his best finish was 15th in the Nordic combined event at Chamonix in 1924.

Eidenbenz also took the Olympic Oath and was the flag bearer for Switzerland at the 1928 Winter Olympics in St. Moritz.
