= Frank Sullivan (ice hockey, born 1898) =

Canadian ice hockey player

Personal information
- Born: Francis Gerald Sullivan; July 26, 1898 Toronto, Ontario, Canada
- Died: January 8, 1989 (aged 90)

Sport
- Sport: Ice hockey
- Team: Toronto Varsity Blues
Medal record
Men's ice hockey
Representing Canada
Gold medal – first place	1928 St. Moritz	Team competition

Francis Gerald Sullivan (July 26, 1898 – January 8, 1989) was a Canadian ice hockey player who competed in the 1928 Winter Olympics.

== Career ==
At the 1928 Winter Olympics, Sullivan was a member of the Toronto Varsity Blues, the Canadian team that won the gold medal. His brother, Joe, was also on the team. His son, Peter, played in the National Hockey League with the Winnipeg Jets.
