= Oskar Schmidt (ice hockey) =

Swiss ice hockey player

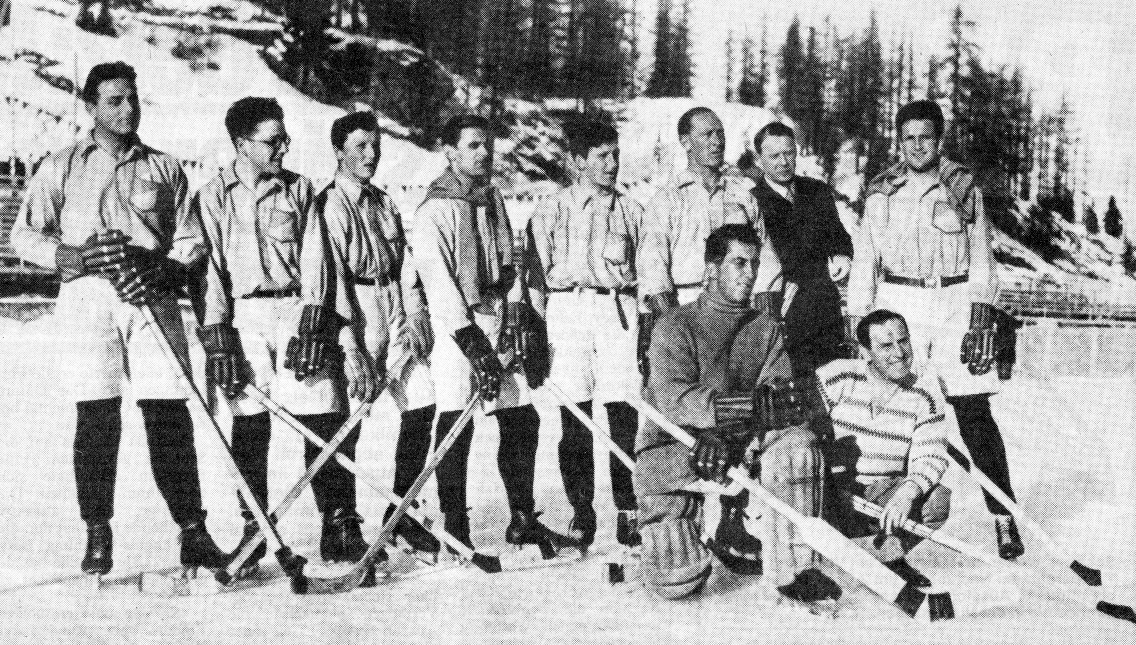
- Born: 27 May 1908 St. Moritz, Switzerland
- Died: December 26, 1974 (aged 66) St. Moritz, Switzerland
- Position: Defence
- Played for: EHC St. Moritz
- National team: Switzerland
- Playing career: 1928–1939

Oskar Schmidt (27 May 1908 – 26 December 1974) was a Swiss ice hockey player who competed for the Swiss national team at the 1936 Winter Olympics in Garmisch-Partenkirchen.
