= Charles Delahaye (ice hockey) =

Canadian ice hockey player

- Born: March 19, 1905
- Died: March 17, 1973 (aged 67)
- National team: Canada
- Playing career: 1928–1928
Medal record
Men's ice hockey
Representing Canada
Olympic Games
Gold medal – first place	1928 St. Moritz	Team competition

Frederick Charles Delahaye, sometimes spelled Delahay or Delahey (March 19, 1905 – March 17, 1973), was a Canadian ice hockey player who competed in the 1928 Winter Olympics. In 1928 he was a member of the University of Toronto Grads, the team which won the Olympic gold medal for Canada.
