= Norbert Mueller =

Canadian ice hockey player

- Born: February 14, 1906; Waterloo, Ontario, Canada
- Died: July 6, 1956 (aged 50)
- Position: Goaltender
- National team: Canada
- Playing career: 1926–1933

Olympic medal record

Men's ice hockey

Representing Canada
Gold medal – first place	1928 St. Moritz	Team competition

Norbert Edward "Stuffy" Mueller (February 14, 1906 – July 6, 1956) was a Canadian ice hockey player, born in Waterloo, Ontario, who competed in the 1928 Winter Olympics.

In 1928 he was a member of the University of Toronto Grads, the Canadian team which won the gold medal.
