= William Thompson (skier) =

Canadian cross-country skier (1905–1994)

Personal information
- Born: 18 May 1905 Kemptville, Ontario, Canada
- Died: 3 April 1994 (aged 88) Nepean, Ontario, Canada

Sport
- Sport: Cross-country skiing

William Thompson (18 May 1905 – 3 April 1994) was a Canadian cross-country skier. He competed in the men's 18 kilometre event at the 1928 Winter Olympics.
