= Ross Taylor (ice hockey) =

Canadian ice hockey player

Olympic medal record

Men's ice hockey

Representing Canada
Gold medal – first place	1928 St. Moritz	Team competition

Ross Croft Taylor (April 26, 1902 – May 3, 1984) was a Canadian ice hockey player who competed in the 1928 Winter Olympics.

In 1928 he was a member of the University of Toronto Grads, the Canadian team which won the gold medal.
