= Molliens-Dreuil =

- Commune
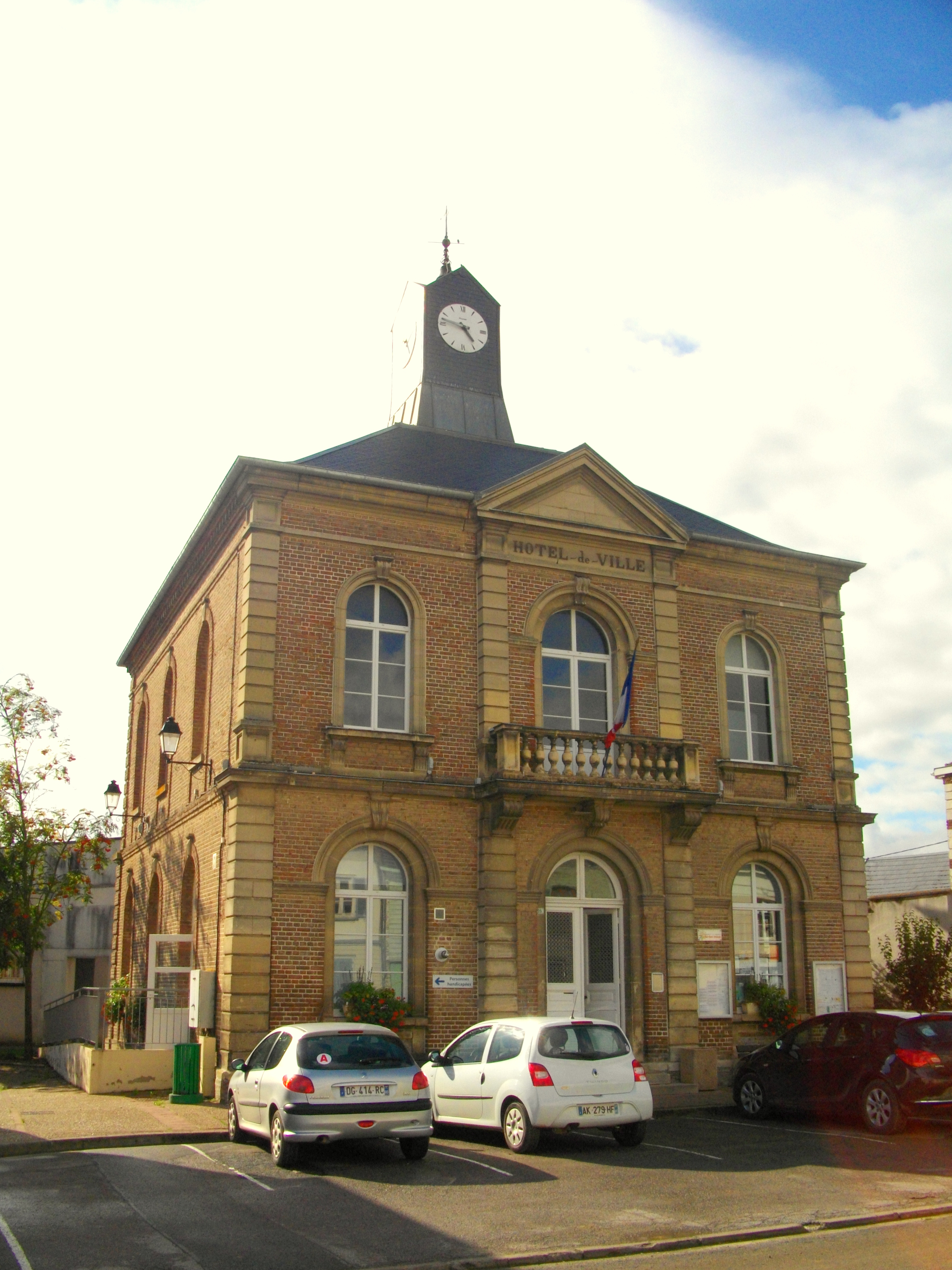
- The town hall in Molliens-Dreuil

- Coat of arms
- Location of Molliens-Dreuil
- Location within France Location within Hauts-de-France
- Coordinates: 49°53′02″N 2°01′12″E
- Country: France
- Region: Hauts-de-France
- Department: Somme
- Arrondissement: Amiens
- Canton: Ailly-sur-Somme
- Intercommunality: CC Somme Sud-Ouest

Government
  - Mayor (2020–2026): Sylvain Charbonnier
- Area^{1}: 22.8 km^{2} (8.8 sq mi)
- Elevation: 49 m (161 ft)
- Highest elevation: 129 m (423 ft)
- Lowest elevation: 40 m (130 ft)
- Population (2023): 921
  - Density: 40.4/km^{2} (105/sq mi)
- Time zone: UTC+01:00 (CET)
  - Summer (DST): UTC+02:00 (CEST)
- INSEE/Postal code: 80554 /80540
- ^{1} French Land Register data, which excludes lakes, ponds, glaciers > 1 km^{2} (0.386 sq mi or 247 acres) and river estuaries.

Molliens-Dreuil (French pronunciation: [mɔljɛ̃ dʁœj]) is a commune in the Somme department in Hauts-de-France in northern France.

== Geography ==
The commune is situated on the D211 and D69 roads, some 13 miles (21 km) west of Amiens, in the valley of a small stream called the St.Landon.

== History ==
By a decree of 19 September 1972, the two communes of Dreuil-lès-Molliens and Molliens-Vidame were combined into one, Molliens-Dreuil.
Molliens was first a commune in 1209 and was under the jurisdiction of the seigneurs of Picquigny from the twelfth century right up until the French Revolution, as was the neighbouring village of Dreuil.

== Population ==
Historical population
Year	Pop.	±% p.a.
1968	555	—
1975	582	+0.68%
1982	789	+4.44%
1990	878	+1.34%
1999	830	−0.62%
2007	888	+0.85%
2012	810	−1.82%
2017	958	+3.41%
2023	921	−0.65%
Source: INSEE

== Places of interest ==
- Evidence of a feudal motte.
- sixteenth century church of St.Pierre-aux-Liens
- eighteenth century church of Saint Martin. Displayed inside is a 15th-century bas-relief of Christ.

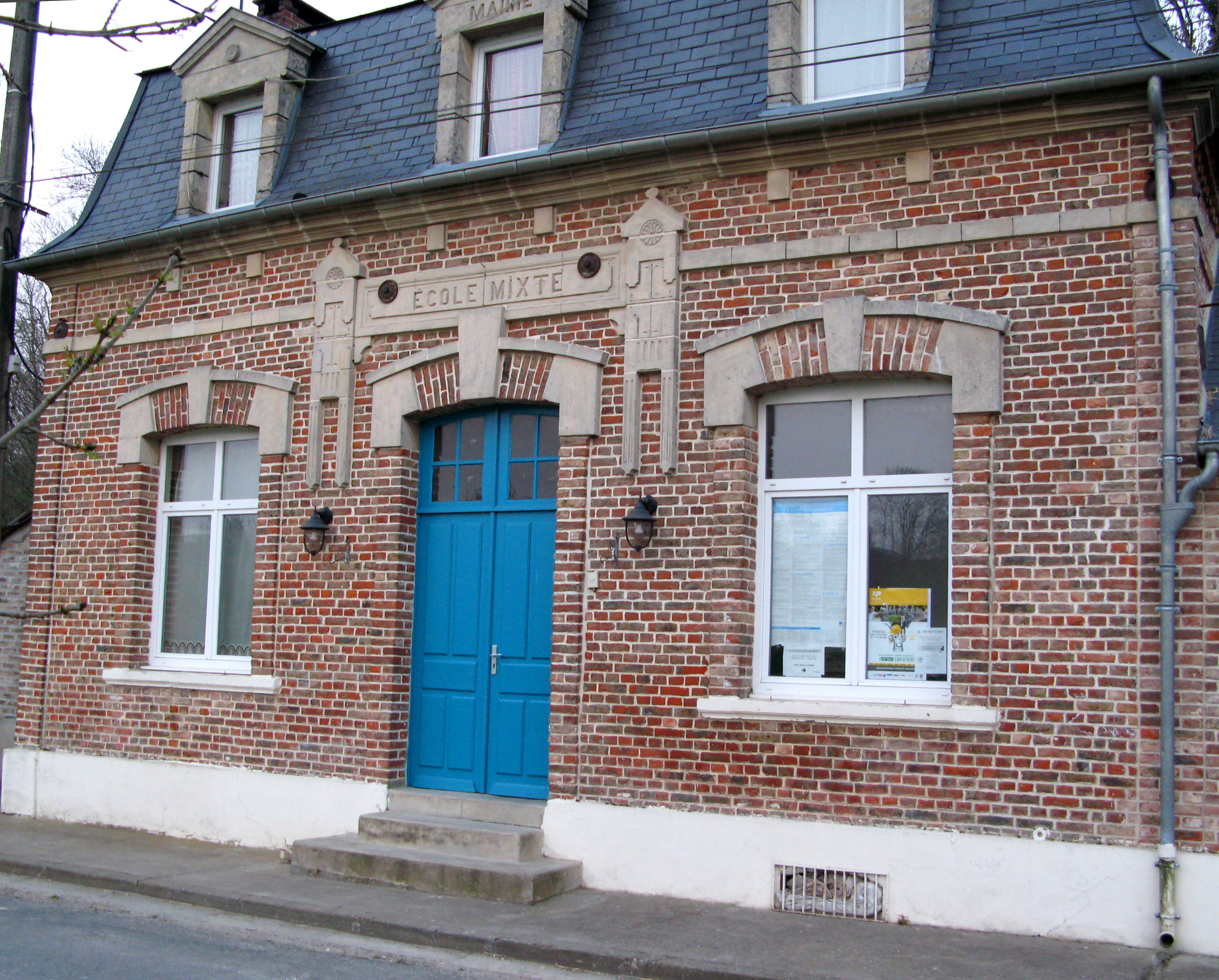
Dreuil-lès-Molliens school and Mayor's office

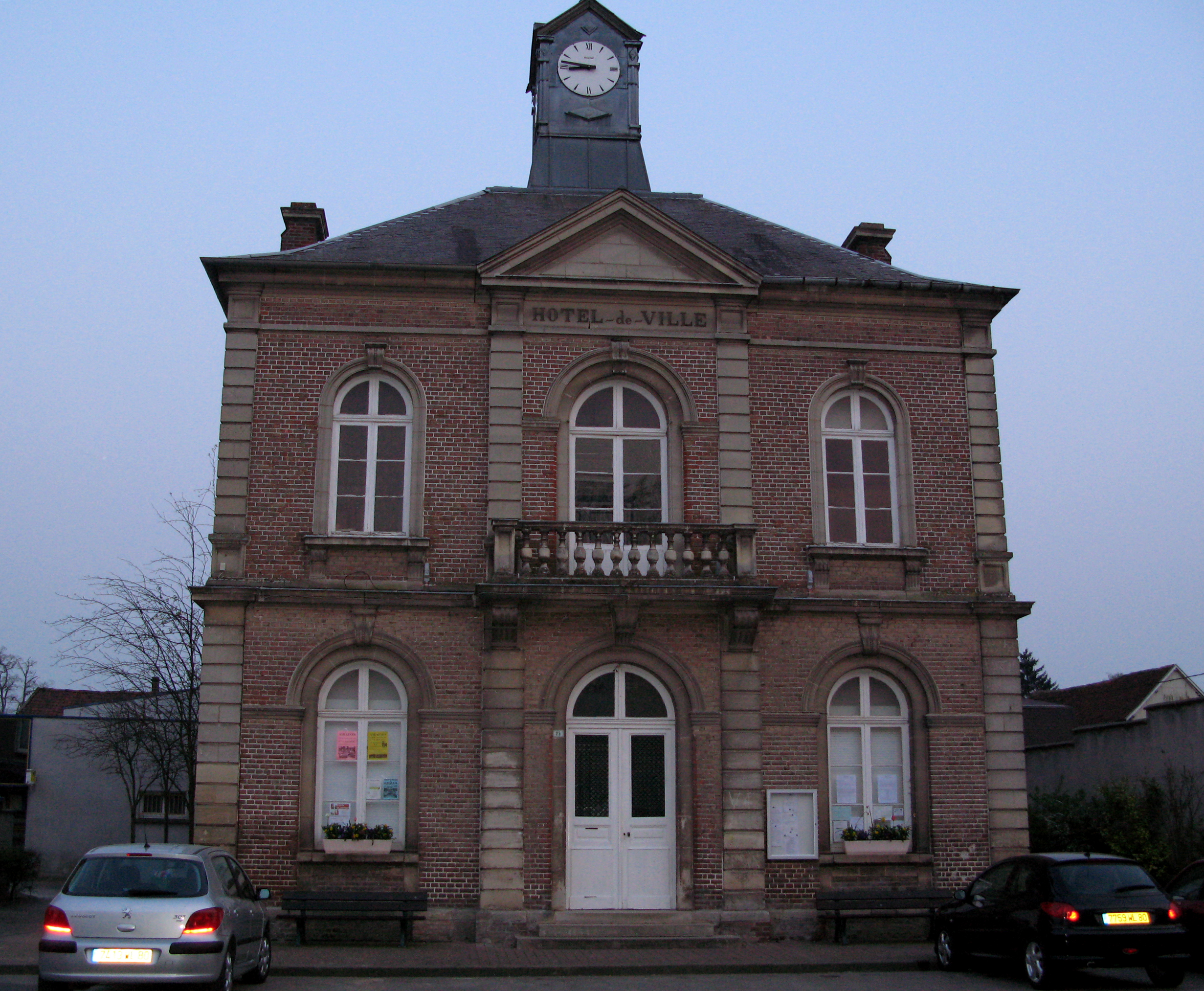
Dusk at the Mayor's office

== See also ==
- Communes of the Somme department
