= Mollens =

Mollens may refer to:

- Mollens, Valais, Switzerland
- Mollens, Vaud, Switzerland
