= John Schneiter =

Swiss bobsledder (1899–1976)

Medal record

Bobsleigh

World Championships
Silver medal – second place	1930 Caux-sur-Montreux	Four-man

John Schneiter (1899 – 15 September 1976) was a Swiss bobsledder who competed in the late 1920s and early 1930s. At the 1928 Winter Olympics he was a member of the Swiss team Suisse II which finished 13th in the five man competition. He won a silver medal in the four-man event at the first FIBT World Championships in Montreux, Switzerland, at the Caux-sur-Montreux hotel in 1930.
