= Anton Morosani =

Swiss ice hockey player

Olympic medal record

Men's Ice hockey
Bronze medal – third place	1928 St. Moritz	Team competition

Anton Morosani (20 June 1907 – 8 June 1993) was a Swiss ice hockey player who competed in the 1928 Winter Olympics.

He was a member of the Swiss ice hockey team, which won the bronze medal.
