= Alexandru Papană =

Romanian bobsledder and aviator

- Born: Alexandru Papană; 18 October 1906
- Died: 17 April 1946 (aged 39)

Alexandru Papană
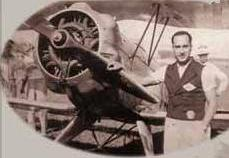

Medal record

Bobsleigh

World Championships
Gold medal – first place	1933 Schreiberhau	Two-man
Bronze medal – third place	1934 Engelberg	Two-man

Alexandru "Alex" Papană (18 October 1906 – 17 April 1946) was a Romanian-American aviator and bobsledder who competed from the early 1930s to the late 1940s.

== Bobsleigh career ==
Competing for Romania in bobsleigh, he won two medals in the two-man event at the FIBT World Championships with a gold in 1933 and a bronze in 1934. Papană also competed in two Winter Olympics, earning his best finish of fourth in the two-man event at Lake Placid, New York, in 1932. He retired from bobsledding after the 1936 Winter Olympics.

== Aviation career ==
Papană obtained his pilot's license in 1928 while in Romania, and was already setting altitude records in 1931. At the 1936 Summer Olympics in Berlin, he competed in gliding (which was a demonstration sport), finishing a respectable 12th as the only representative from Romania. This earned him an invitation to an aerobatics competition in Los Angeles.

Papană accepted the offer, and he and his plane, a Bücker Bü 133B Jungermeister (one of only two versions of that variant ever produced) with the registration YR-PAX, were flown from Frankfurt, Germany, to New York, New York, aboard the Hindenburg airship in August 1936. He then flew across the United States from New York to Los Angeles, winning the race between the cities. In Los Angeles, he won the national air races that were held there. In December of that year, Papană finished second with the Jungermeister in a race from Miami, Florida, to Havana, Cuba.

At an airshow in Cleveland, Ohio, the following year, Papană was in a battle with fellow aviator Count Hagenburg that ended up crashing the count's aircraft. Papană offered Hagenburg his aircraft, but the count refused.

Papană's aircraft was damaged on the runway at an airport in Chicago, Illinois, in 1940. The plane was sold twice before being donated to the Smithsonian Institution in 1973. The aircraft is now located at the Steven F. Udvar-Hazy Center in Chantilly, Virginia.

Papană later tested gliders for Northrop as a test pilot, many of his flights being documented in Flying magazine. He was involved in the trials for the P-61 Black Widow aircraft that would be involved during World War II for the United States Army Air Forces.

== Other activities ==
Papană was also active in his youth as a goalkeeper, competing for Colţea București.

== Personal life ==
Papană was born in Bucharest. He was married twice. His first wife Dina, who he married in 1938, died while in childbirth on 5 September of that same year. He remarried to Jean Hacker on 30 April 1945, but their marriage in Beverly Hills, California, did not go well.

He died on 17 April 1946 after abandoning his car 17 miles (27 km) south of Las Vegas, Nevada. Authorities discovered Papană's body six days later with a suicide note. Papană died by poisoning.
