= Luzius Rüedi =

Swiss ice hockey player

Olympic medal record

Men's Ice hockey
Bronze medal – third place	1928 St. Moritz	Team competition

Luzius Rüedi (12 June 1900 – 19 July 1993) was a Swiss ice hockey player who won a bronze medal in the 1928 Winter Olympics.

He was born in Thusis, Switzerland and died in Zürich, Switzerland.

Rüedi was a member of the Swiss ice hockey team, which won the bronze medal. The team finished behind Canada and Sweden in the 1928 Olympics.
