= Alexander Berner =

Swiss skeleton racer

Alexander Berner (born 1901, date of death unknown) was a Swiss skeleton racer who competed in the late 1920s. He finished fifth in the men's skeleton event at the 1928 Winter Olympics in St. Moritz.
