= Dumitru Hubert =

Romanian bobsledder (1899–1934)

Medal record

Bobsleigh

World Championships
Gold medal – first place	1933 Schreiberhau	Two-man
Bronze medal – third place	1934 Engelberg	Two-man

Dumitru Hubert (born 3 September 1899; died 27 August 1934 in Braşov) is a Romanian bobsledder and aviator who competed in the 1930s. He won two medals in the two-man event at the FIBT World Championships with a gold in 1933 and a bronze in 1934.

At the 1932 Winter Olympics in Lake Placid, New York, Hubert finished fourth in the two-man event and sixth in the four-man event.

On 27 August 1934, Hubert was participating in an airshow in Braşov when the plane he was piloting crashed in front of the crowd that was watching him, killing him instantly.
