= Frank Fisher (ice hockey) =

Canadian ice hockey player (1901–1983)

Franklyn Fisher
- Born: January 1, 1901 Bailieboro, Ontario, Canada
- Died: April 23, 1984 (aged 83) Toronto, Ontario, Canada
- Played for: University of Toronto Grads
Medal record
Men's ice hockey
Representing Canada
Gold medal – first place	1928 St. Moritz	Team competition

Franklyn Wood Fisher (January 1, 1901 – April 23, 1983) was a Canadian ice hockey player who competed in the 1928 Winter Olympics.

In 1928, he was a member of the Toronto Varsity Blues men's ice hockey team, which won the gold medal.
