= William Pichard =

Swiss bobsledder (1897–1957)

Personal information
- Nationality: Swiss
- Born: 12 October 1897 Ormont-Dessus, Switzerland
- Died: 23 December 1957 (aged 60) Ormont-Dessus, Switzerland

Sport
- Sport: Bobsleigh
Medal record
Bobsleigh
World Championships
Silver medal – second place	1930 Caux-sur-Montreux	Four-man

William Pichard (12 October 1897 – 23 December 1957) was a Swiss bobsledder. He competed in the four-man event at the 1928 Winter Olympics. He also won a silver medal in the four-man event at the first FIBT World Championships in Montreux, Switzerland at the Caux-sur-Montreux hotel in 1930.
