= Stephan Lauener =

Swiss skier

Personal information
- Nationality: Swiss
- Born: 1898
- Died: 1988 (aged 89–90)

Sport
- Sport: Skiing
- Events: Nordic combined skiing; Ski jumping

Stephan Lauener (1898–1988) was a Swiss skier. He competed at the 1928 Winter Olympics in St. Moritz, where he placed 13th in Nordic combined. He placed sixth in ski jumping at the FIS Nordic World Ski Championships 1925.
