= Walter Bussmann =

Swiss cross-country skier

Personal information
- Nationality: Swiss
- Born: 20 October 1904
- Died: 11 February 1957 (aged 52); Lucerne, Switzerland

Sport
- Sport: Cross-country skiing

Walter Bussmann (20 October 1904 – 11 February 1957) was a Swiss cross-country skier. He competed in the men's 18 kilometre event at the 1928 Winter Olympics.
