= Hugh Plaxton =

Canadian ice hockey player and politician

Member of Parliament for Trinity
- In office 1935–1940
- Succeeded by: Arthur Roebuck

Personal details
- Born: May 16, 1904 Barrie, Ontario, Canada
- Died: December 1, 1982 (aged 78) Mississauga, Ontario, Canada
- Party: Liberal
- Profession: Hockey player

Olympic medal record

Men's ice hockey

Representing Canada
Gold medal – first place	1928 St. Moritz	Team competition

Hugh John Plaxton (May 16, 1904 – December 1, 1982) was a Canadian ice hockey player and politician. During his hockey career, he competed in the 1928 Winter Olympics, winning a gold medal with Canada, and later played 17 games in the National Hockey League with the Montreal Maroons during the 1932–33 season. In his political career, he served in the House of Commons of Canada from 1935 to 1940, representing Trinity as a member of the Liberal Party.

== Playing career ==
In 1928 he was a member of the University of Toronto Grads, the Canadian team which won the gold medal with his brother Herbert and cousin Roger. He also played NHL hockey for the Montreal Maroons in the 1932–33 season.

== Political career ==
After retiring from hockey, Plaxton qualified as a lawyer and entered politics. He was elected to parliament in the 1935 federal election as a Liberal MP from the Toronto riding of Trinity defeating Minister of Justice and former Toronto mayor George Reginald Geary. He lost the Liberal Party nomination in 1940 federal election to former Ontario Attorney-General Arthur Roebuck but attempted to return to Parliament in the 1945 federal election running in the riding of Kingston City where he was defeated by Conservative Thomas Kidd.

In January 1937, Plaxton introduced a resolution in the House of Commons of Canada to propose establishment of a Canadian ministry for sport. He stated it had potential to take over administration of sports and eliminate "disputes over authority and jurisdiction". Amateur Athletic Union of Canada (AAU of C) president Jack Hamilton felt that a ministry might be beneficial, and that sport could be promoted with the help of the department of health and reach more areas of Canada. He wanted more discussion on what would happen to sports organizations if the government took control of or organized sports, but stated that the AAU of C would cooperate.

Plaxton was one of two former hockey players to have been elected a Member of Parliament for Trinity, the other being Lionel Conacher who was elected as a Liberal MP for the riding in 1949 and 1953.

== Personal life ==
Plaxton lived in Mississauga's Port Credit area by 1948.

== Career statistics ==
=== Regular season and playoffs ===
			Regular season					Playoffs
Season	Team	League	GP	G	A	Pts	PIM	GP	G	A	Pts	PIM
1921–22	University of Toronto	CIAUC	3	0	0	0	0	—	—	—	—	—
1922–23	University of Toronto	CIAUC	6	11	3	14	—	1	0	0	0	0
1923–24	University of Toronto	CIAUC	8	18	3	21	10	3	1	1	2	6
1923–24	University of Toronto	M-Cup	—	—	—	—	—	2	0	1	1	2
1924–25	University of Toronto	CIAUC	8	4	2	6	—	—	—	—	—	—
1924–25	University of Toronto	Al-Cup	—	—	—	—	—	6	5	2	7	—
1925–26	University of Toronto	CIAUC	—	—	—	—	—	—	—	—	—	—
1926–27	University of Toronto Grads	OHA Sr	9	31	7	38	11	2	0	0	0	0
1926–27	University of Toronto	Al-Cup	—	—	—	—	—	11	21	5	26	22
1927–28	University of Toronto Grads	Exhib	12	20	10	30	—	—	—	—	—	—
1932–33	Windsor Bulldogs	IHL	10	1	1	2	4	—	—	—	—	—
1932–33	Vancouver Maroons	WCHL	8	0	0	0	0	—	—	—	—	—
1932–33	Montreal Maroons	NHL	17	1	2	3	4	—	—	—	—	—
NHL totals			17	1	3	4	4	—	—	—	—	—

=== International ===
Year	Team	Event	GP	G	A	Pts	PIM
1928	Canada	OLY	3	12	0	12	0
Senior totals			3	12	0	12	0
