= Sepp Mühlbauer =

Swiss ski jumper (1904–1995)

Personal information
- Nationality: Swiss
- Born: 20 May 1904; St. Moritz, Switzerland
- Died: 13 February 1995 (aged 90); Lausanne, Switzerland

Sport
- Sport: Ski jumping
- Club: Ski Club Of Great Britain

Sepp Mühlbauer (20 May 1904 – 13 February 1995) was a Swiss ski jumper. He participated at the 1928 Winter Olympics in St. Moritz, where he placed seventh, with a first jump of 52 metres and a second jump of 58 metres. He represented the British Ski Club Of Great Britain.
