= Merritt Putman =

Canadian cross-country skier

Personal information
- Born: 22 February 1900; Ottawa, Ontario, Canada
- Died: 1995 (aged 94–95); Arnprior, Ontario, Canada

Sport
- Sport: Cross-country skiing

Merritt Graybiel Putman (22 February 1900 – 1995) was a Canadian cross-country skier. He competed in the men's 18 kilometre event at the 1928 Winter Olympics.
