= Louis Dufour =

Swiss ice hockey player (1901–1982)

- Born: July 26, 1901 Les Avants, Switzerland
- Died: October 26, 1982 (aged 81) Geneva, Switzerland
- Height: 183 cm (6 ft 0 in)
- Position: Centre
- Shot: Left
- National team: Switzerland
- Playing career: 1920–1935
Medal record
Olympic Games
Bronze medal – third place	1928 St. Moritz	Team

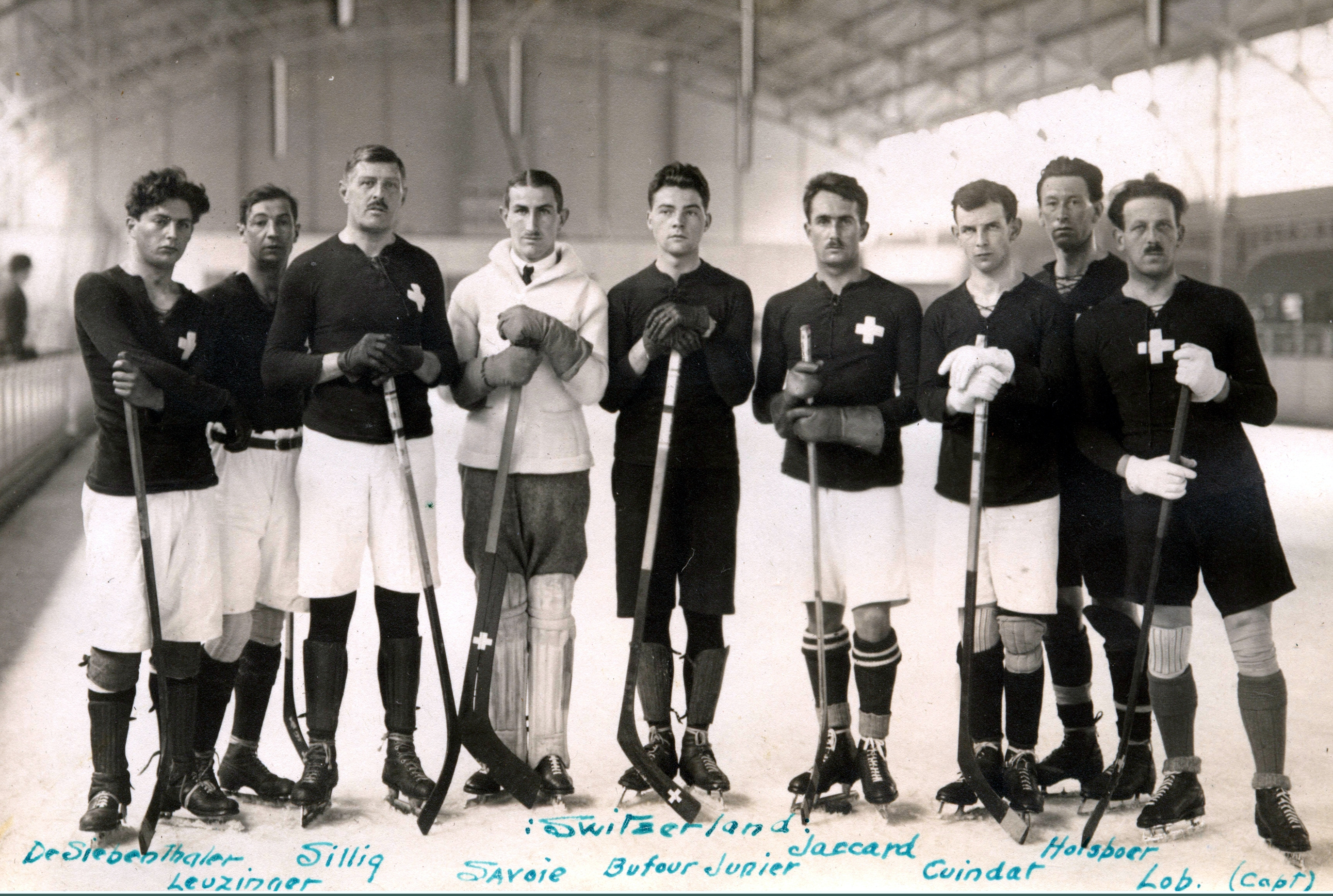

Louis François Dufour Jr. (26 July 1901 – 26 October 1982) was a Swiss ice hockey player who competed in the 1920 Summer Olympics and in the 1928 Winter Olympics. In 1920, he participated with the Swiss ice hockey team in the Summer Olympics ice hockey tournament along with his father, Louis Dufour Sr. Four years later he was also a member of the Swiss team in the first Winter Olympics tournament, though he did not play any games. At the 1928 Olympics he won the bronze medal with the Swiss ice hockey team.
