= Joseph Albert Sullivan =

Ice hockey player, doctor, and politician (1901–1988)

The Honourable Joseph Albert Sullivan

Canadian Senator from Ontario
- In office 1957–1985
- Appointed by: John Diefenbaker

Personal details
- Born: January 8, 1901 Toronto, Ontario
- Died: September 30, 1988 (aged 87)
- Party: Progressive Conservative

Olympic medal record

Men's ice hockey

Representing Canada
Gold medal – first place	1928 St. Moritz	Team competition

Joseph Albert Taylor Sullivan (January 8, 1901 – September 30, 1988) was a Canadian Olympic ice hockey player, physician, surgeon, and member of the Senate of Canada.

== Background ==
Born in Toronto, Ontario, he graduated from the University of Toronto Schools. In 1926, he earned his medical degree from the University of Toronto Faculty of Medicine. While studying, he was the goaltender for the Toronto Varsity Blues hockey team. A team of graduates from the Blues represented Canada at the 1928 Winter Olympics in St. Moritz, where the team won the Gold Medal, with Sullivan not allowing a goal in the three-game round-robin. His brother, Frank, was also on the team. In 1930, he started his medical practice, specializing in otolaryngology. During World War II, he served as a consultant in otolaryngology with the honorary rank of wing commander in the Royal Canadian Air Force. After the war, he became an associate professor at the University of Toronto. One of his patients was the Prime Minister of Canada, John Diefenbaker. In 1957, he was appointed to the Senate of Canada by Diefenbaker, representing the senatorial division of North York, Ontario. A Progressive Conservative, he resigned in 1985.

In 1988, he was inducted into the University of Toronto Sports Hall of Fame. The Senator Joseph A. Sullivan Trophy, named in his honour, is presented annually to the outstanding hockey player in Canadian Interuniversity Sport.

A Roman Catholic, Sullivan was a papal Knight of the Order of the Holy Sepulchre and a papal Knight Commander of Order of St. Gregory the Great with distinction.

== Sources ==
- "University of Toronto Sports Hall of Fame List | Joseph Sullivan - 1926, Medicine (archived)". University of Toronto Faculty of Physical Education and Health. Archived from the original on 2010-05-28.
- "Obituary". The Globe and Mail. October 3, 1988.
