= Henry Louis Hudson =

Canadian ice hockey player

Personal information
- Born: Henry Dewey Louis Hudson; May 16, 1898
- Died: June 24, 1975 (aged 77)

Sport
- Sport: Ice hockey
Medal record
Men's ice hockey
Representing Canada
Gold medal – first place	1928 St. Moritz	Team

Henry Dewey Louis Hudson (May 16, 1898 – June 24, 1975) was a Canadian ice hockey player who competed at the 1928 Winter Olympics in St. Moritz, winning a gold team medal.
