= Herbert Plaxton =

Canadian ice hockey player

Olympic medal record

Men's ice hockey

Representing Canada
Gold medal – first place	1928 St. Moritz	Team competition

Herbert Alfred Wellington "Bert" Plaxton (April 22, 1901 – November 7, 1970) was a Canadian ice hockey player who competed in the 1928 Winter Olympics.

In 1928 he was a member of the University of Toronto Grads, the Canadian team which won the gold medal with his brother Hugh and cousin Roger.
