= Roger Plaxton =

Canadian ice hockey player

Olympic medal record

Men's ice hockey

Representing Canada
Gold medal – first place	1928 St. Moritz	Team competition

Hayward Alan Roger "Rod" Plaxton (June 2, 1904 – December 20, 1963) was a Canadian ice hockey player who competed in the 1928 Winter Olympics.

In 1928, he was a member of the University of Toronto Grads, the Canadian team which won the gold medal with two cousins Herbert and Hugh.
