= John Porter (ice hockey) =

Canadian ice hockey player

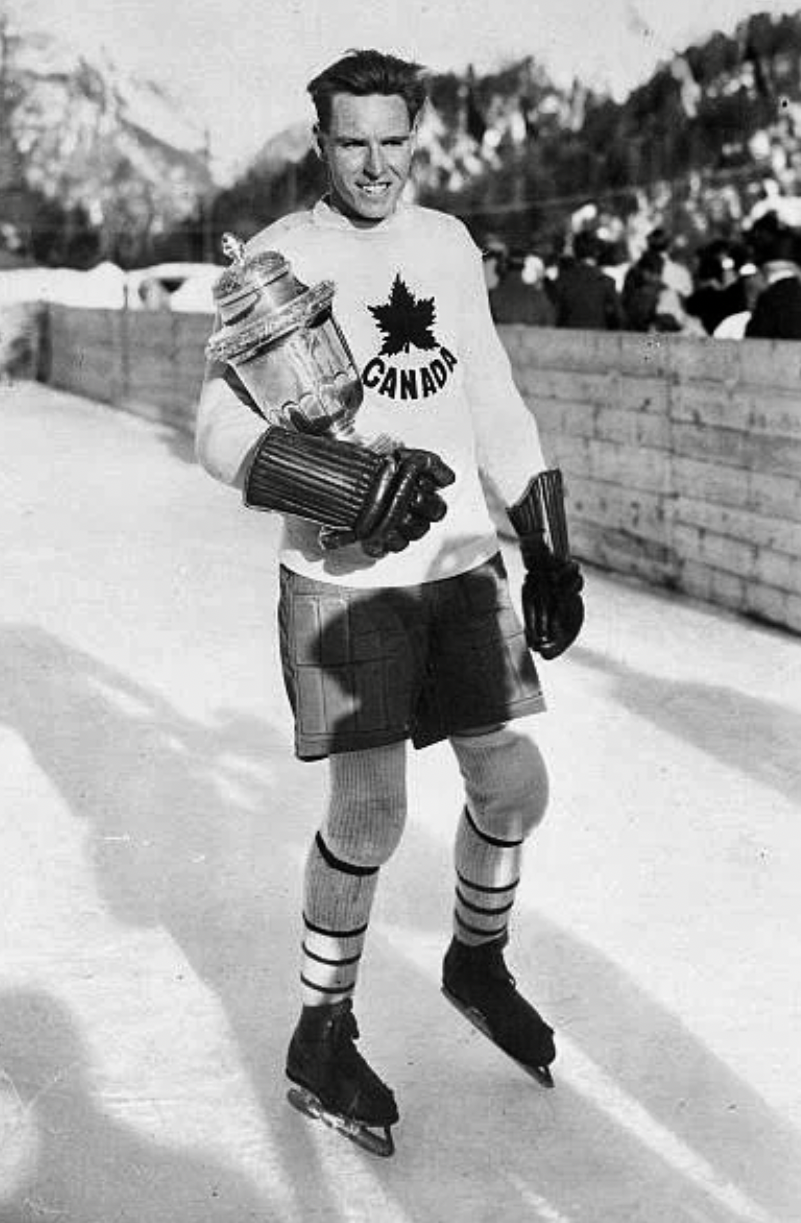
- Porter in 1928

Personal information
- Full name: John Chester Porter
- Born: January 21, 1904 Toronto, Ontario, Canada
- Died: August 6, 1997 (aged 93) Toronto, Ontario, Canada

Sport
- Country: Canada
- Sport: Ice hockey
Medal record
Men's ice hockey
Representing Canada
Gold medal – first place	1928 St. Moritz	Team competition

John Chester "Red" Porter (January 21, 1904 – August 6, 1997) was a Canadian ice hockey player who competed in the 1928 Winter Olympics. He captained the University of Toronto Grads, the Canadian 1927 Allan Cup champions that won the gold medal in 1928, where Porter was Canada's opening-ceremonies flagbearer.

Porter would go on to coach the University of Toronto hockey team from 1928 to 1931. He was inducted into the University of Toronto Hall of Fame in 2004 and the University of Toronto Schools Hall of Fame in 2021.
