= Ernst Feuz =

Swiss ski jumper

Ernst Feuz (7 September 1909 – February 1988) was a Swiss ski jumper. He participated at the 1928 Winter Olympics in St. Moritz, where he placed eighth, with a first jump of 52.5 metres and a second jump of 58.5 metres. He initiated the Schilthorn Cableway in 1959.
