= Mezzi Andreossi =

Swiss ice hockey player (1897–1958)

Olympic medal record

Men's Ice hockey
Bronze medal – third place	1928 St. Moritz	Team competition

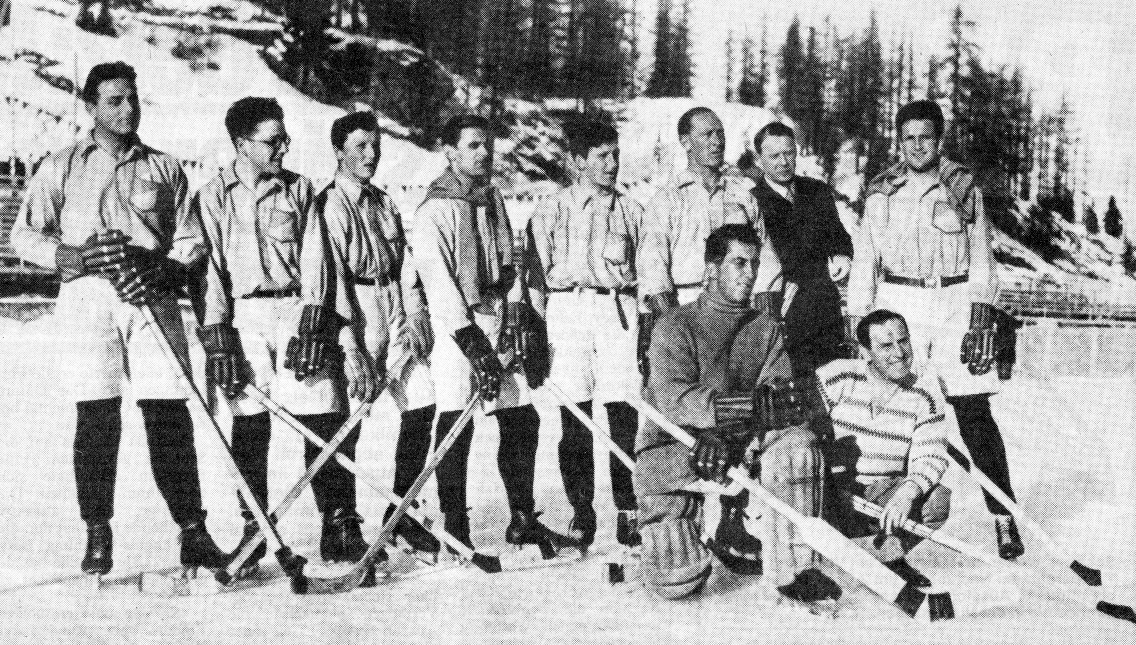

Murezzan Andreossi (30 June 1897 – 28 September 1958) was a Swiss ice hockey player who competed in the 1928 Winter Olympics in St. Moritz, Switzerland. He was a member of the Switzerland national men's ice hockey team that won the bronze medal.
