= Andrew Podnieks =

Canadian author and ice hockey historian

Andrew Podnieks is a Canadian author and ice hockey historian. He has written more than 45 books about hockey. He also has contributed extensively to international hockey research at the International Ice Hockey Federation, the Hockey Hall of Fame, Hockey Canada, and Canada's Sports Hall of Fame. Some of his books have been translated into French and Swedish. He is also a frequent contributor to www.IIHF.com, the official website of international hockey.

== Select bibliography ==
Podnieks books can be divided into six distinct categories: pictorial, historical, statistical, biographical, trivia-based, and commercial.

=== Pictorial ===
- World of Hockey: Celebrating a Century of the IIHF (Fenn Publishing, 2007)
- Celebrating the Game (Fenn Publishing, 2006)
- Silverware (Fenn Publishing, 2005)
- Lord Stanley's Cup (Fenn Publishing, 2004)
- The Goal: Bobby Orr and the Most Famous Goal in Stanley Cup History (Triumph, 2003)
- A Day in the Life of the Maple Leafs (HarperCollins, 2002)
- Canadian Gold 2002: Making Hockey History (Fenn Publishing, 2002)
- Kings of the Ice: A History of World Hockey (NDE Publishing, 2002)
- Shooting Stars: Photographs from the Portnoy Collection at the Hockey Hall of Fame (Doubleday Canada, 1998)
- Honoured Members of the Hockey Hall of Fame (Fenn Publishing, 2003)
- Portraits of the Game: Classic Photographs from the Turofsky Collection at the Hockey Hall of Fame (Doubleday Canada, 1997)

=== Historical ===
- The Complete Hockey Dictionary (Key Porter, 2007)
- A Canadian Saturday Night (Douglas & McIntyre, 2006)
- The Lost Season (Fenn Publishing, 2005)
- Hockey's Greatest Teams: Teams, Players, and Plays that Changed the Game (Penguin Canada, 2000)
- The NHL All-Star Game: Fifty Years of the Great Tradition (HarperCollins, 2000)
- Return to Glory: The Leafs From Imlach to Fletcher (ECW Press, 1995)
- Canada's Olympic Hockey Teams: The Complete History 1920-1998 (Doubleday Canada, 1997)
- Red, White, and Gold: Canada at the World Junior Championships 1974-1999 (ECW Press, 1998).

=== Biographical ===
- The Ultimate A-Z Guide of Everyone Who Has Ever Played in the NHL (Doubleday Canada, 2003
- Messier: Dominance On Ice (Key Porter Books, 2005)
- The Great One: The Life and Times of Wayne Gretzky (Doubleday Canada, 1999)
- The Spectacular Sidney Crosby (Fenn Publishing, 2005)
- Hockey Heroes: Paul Kariya (Greystone Press, 2000, Red Cedar Award nominee in 2000)
- Hockey Heroes: Patrick Roy (Greystone Press, 1998)
- Sid vs Ovi: Natural Born Rivals (McClelland & Stewart)

=== Statistical ===
- GEM Hockey 2007-08 (HarperCollins, 2007)
- The Blue and White Book 1997: The Most Complete Toronto Maple Leafs Fact Book Ever Published (ECW Press, 1996)
- The Red Wings Fact Book 1997: The Most Complete Detroit Red Wings Fact Book Ever Published (ECW Press, 1996)

=== Trivia-based ===
- The Little Book of Hockey Sweaters (Key Porter, 2005)
- The Three Stars and Other Selections: Hockey Lists For Trivia Lovers II (ECW Press, 2000)
- Hello Hockey Fans From Coast to Coast: Amazing Lists for Trivia Lovers (ECW Press, 1999)
- The Little Book of Hockey Sweaters 2 (Key Porter, 2008).

The first was co-authored with Rob Hynes, the second and third with Jeff Davis and the last with Anthony Jenkins.

=== Commercial ===
- The Senators: Celebrating Ottawa's Quest for Lord Stanley's Cup (Fenn Publishing, 2007)
- Gold and Heartbreak (Fenn Publishing, 2006)
- The Oilers: Celebrating Edmonton's Quest for Lord Stanley's Cup (published under Peter Bailey, Fenn Publishing, 2006)
- The Flames: Celebrating Calgary's Dream Season, 2003-04 (Fenn Publishing, 2004)

== International Hockey ==
Podnieks has published several books on international hockey, starting with Canada's Olympic Hockey Teams: The Complete History, 1920-1998. Additionally, he has produced detailed historical and statistical information for Hockey Canada for Canada's history at the World Championships, World Women's Championships, World Junior Championships, and Olympics. He has also created media guides for the IIHF for the World Women's Championship, the World Junior Championship, and the senior men's World Championship.

== Hockey Hall of Fame ==
Podnieks has been the author of many official coffee-table books produced by the Hockey Hall of Fame, starting with Portraits of the Game and continuing with Shooting Stars, Lord Stanley's Cup, Canadian Gold 2002, Honoured Members, Silverware, Celebrating the Game, and World of Hockey: Celebrating a Century of the IIHF.

== Hockey Canada ==
Podnieks has provided Hockey Canada with all statistics and historical information for Canada's participation at the Olympics, World Championships, World Women's Championships, and World Junior Championships, from the start of these tournaments to 2003.

== Video ==
Podnieks has been featured prominently on three programs. First, as a featured interview for The Olympians—Hockey (one-hour CBC documentary produced for 2002 Olympic Winter Games). Second, for "The Making of 'A Day in the Life of the Maple Leafs'" produced by Leafs TV in conjunction with the publication of A Day in the Life of the Maple Leafs (HarperCollins) in 2002. Third, as a featured interview subject for The Tradition of the Toronto Maple Leafs (75th anniversary Toronto Maple Leafs NHL video, 2001).

== See also ==
- Ice hockey at the Olympic Games
