= André Moillen =

Swiss bobsledder (1906–1952)

Personal information
- Nationality: Swiss
- Born: 1906
- Died: 14 February 1952 (aged 45–46); Corseaux, Switzerland

Sport
- Sport: Bobsleigh

André Moillen
Medal record

Bobsleigh

World Championships
Silver medal – second place	1930 Caux-sur-Montreux	Four-man

André Moillen (1906 – 14 February 1952) was a Swiss bobsledder who competed in the late 1920s and early 1930s. He competed in the five-man event at the 1928 Winter Olympics. He won a silver medal in the four-man event at the first FIBT World Championships in Montreux, Switzerland at the Caux-sur-Montreux hotel in 1930.

He and his cousin Jean Moillen, also a bobsledder whom Moillen competed alongside, were later killed in a car accident, in 1952.
