= 1927 Allan Cup =

Canadian senior ice hockey championship

The Allan Cup was the championship trophy for amateur senior ice hockey in Canada.

The 1927 Allan Cup was the senior ice hockey championship for the Canadian Amateur Hockey Association for the 1926–27 season. According to CAHA president Frank Sandercock, the profit of C$16,000 from the 1927 Allan Cup exceeded the combined profits from 1923 to 1926.

== Final ==
Best-of-three format:

- Fort William 2 Toronto 2
- Fort William 3 Toronto 2
- Toronto 4 Fort William 1
- Toronto 2 Fort William 1

Toronto Varsity Grads beat Fort William Thundering Herd 2–1, 1 tie on series.
