= John Røen =

Norwegian cross-country skier

John Røen (22 April 1903 – 18 March 1979) was a Norwegian cross-country skier. He competed in the 50 km at the 1928 Winter Olympics in St. Moritz.

He grew up in Rindal Municipality, Norway, as a brother of Sigurd Røen. His skiing club was SK Troll. In 1925 he made his national breakthrough with silver medals in the Hovedlandsrennet (the national championship), both in the 17 and 30 kilometre races. In 1926 he finished ninth in the 50 kilometre race at the Holmenkollen ski festival, followed by a tenth place in 1927. At the 1927 Holmenkollen ski festival he also finished 12th in Nordic combined. He also finished second in the Gråkallen race the same year.

John Røen's training improved when his farm had electric light installed. He was able to ski in slopes around the farmhouse, studying his own technique by looking at his own shadow. After his tenth place at Holmenkollen in 1927, Røen was a candidate for the Norwegian squad at the 1928 Winter Olympics one year later. The weather conditions in Nordmøre in the winter of 1927–28 featured little snow, however, so Røen's exercise consisted mainly of running. By Christmas of 1927, he had not worn his skis a single time yet. Therefore, Røen ruled that he should not attend the Olympic prospects' training camp in Lillehammer with such scant training. When the Olympic trials neared, Røen travelled by skis to Svorkmo to catch the Thamshavn Line to Trondhjem, further connecting to Oslo.

The Olympic trials were held on 15 January, with Ole Hegge and Olav Kjelbotn being outstanding. Røen finished third ahead of Ole Stenen. The Norwegian Skiing Federation then took into consideration, wrote P. Chr. Andersen, that "Røen is from Nordmøre, having grown up in Rindalen, and is a better skier than the impression given by the prize lists. Often, Røen has not had the opportunity to participate in the big races here in Southern Norway".

The Norwegian Olympic squad assembled in Oslo to travel by train to Trelleborg, then by boat to Germany and train from Hamburg to Basel. Instead of continuing straight to St. Moritz, the Norwegian leader Olaf Helset rented a private car to take a small party including Røen to Chamonix in order to gain experience from the Coupe de France event. Here, John Røen won the 50 kilometres ahead of compatriot Johan Støa and the three Frenchmen Évariste Prat, Camille Tournier and Henri Millan. He then finished second in the 18 kilometres race. The experience was deemed a success, but the Olympic 50 kilometre race was a failure. Røen forfeited the race, having struggled with bad equipment (as did several other racers) and "stomach cramps", perhaps from food poisoning.

Røen's journey home from the Olympics was also remembered for posterity. As the Olympic squad returned to Oslo, Røen boarded the train to Trondhjem, then boat to Orkanger and train to Løkken. From there, he would travel home by skis. He saddled up with a backpack containing several weeks worth of luggage, and the first prize trophy he won at Chamonix under one arm. Adresseavisen described the cup as 40 by 20 centimetres and made of porcelain. Before the train departed, Røen remarked to the station clerk: "Do you have more [goods] that need transporting to Rindal?". By now, however, he was too exhausted to contend the Hovedlandsrennet in 1928.

In January 1979, Røen was proclaimed honorary member of his sports club Troll, being among the first honorary members except for the club founders. He died in March 1979, aged 76.

== Cross-country skiing results ==
=== Olympic Games ===
Year	Age	18 km	50 km
1928	24	—	DNF
