= 1928 in sports =

1928 in sports describes the year's events in world sport.

== American football ==
- NFL championship – Providence Steam Roller (8–1–2)
- USC Trojans – college football national championship shared with Georgia Tech Yellow Jackets

== Association football ==
England

- The Football League – Everton 53 points, Huddersfield Town 51, Leicester City 48, Derby County 44, Bury 44, Cardiff City 44
- FA Cup final – Blackburn Rovers 3–1 Huddersfield Town at Empire Stadium, Wembley, London

Germany

- National Championship – Hamburger SV 5–2 Hertha BSC at Hamburg-Altona

Spain

- La Liga (Primera División del España), a professional top football league of Spain, was officially founded on February 10.

== Australian rules football ==
VFL Premiership

- Collingwood wins the 32nd VFL Premiership: Collingwood 13.18 (96) d Richmond 9.9 (63) at Melbourne Cricket Ground (MCG)

Brownlow Medal

- The annual Brownlow Medal is awarded to Ivor Warne-Smith (Melbourne)

== Bandy ==
Sweden

- Championship final – IF Göta 5-3 IK Sirius

== Baseball ==
World Series

- 4–9 October — New York Yankees (AL) defeats St. Louis Cardinals (NL) to win the 1928 World Series by 4 games to 0

== Basketball ==
ABL Championship

- New York Celtics over Fort Wayne Hoosiers (3–1)

== Bobsleigh ==
Olympic Games (Men's Competition)

- A 5-man bob event is held at the 1928 Winter Olympics in St Moritz.
- The gold medal is won by USA II ahead of USA I (silver) and Germany II (bronze).

== Boxing ==
Events

- 26 July — Gene Tunney's final fight is a 12th-round technical knockout of Tom Heeney in the Bronx; the World Heavyweight Championship becomes vacant until 1930

Lineal world champions

- World Heavyweight Championship – Gene Tunney → vacant
- World Light Heavyweight Championship – Tommy Loughran
- World Middleweight Championship – Mickey Walker
- World Welterweight Championship – Joe Dundee
- World Lightweight Championship – Sammy Mandell
- World Featherweight Championship – vacant → Tony Canzoneri → Andre Routis
- World Bantamweight Championship – vacant
- World Flyweight Championship – vacant

== Canadian football ==
Grey Cup

- 16th Grey Cup – Hamilton Tigers 30–0 Regina Roughriders

== Cricket ==
Events

- The Board of Control for Cricket in India (BCCI) is inaugurated.
- The West Indian team touring England in the 1928 season is the first to play Test cricket but is not very successful, losing all three Tests by an innings and winning only five out of 30 first-class matches.

England

- County Championship – Lancashire
- Minor Counties Championship – Berkshire
- Most runs – Frank Woolley 3352 @ 60.94 (HS 198)
- Most wickets – Tich Freeman 304 @ 18.05 (BB 9–104)
- Wisden Cricketers of the Year – Leslie Ames, George Duckworth, Maurice Leyland, Sam Staples, Jack White

Australia

- Sheffield Shield – Victoria
- Most runs – Bill Ponsford 1217 @ 152.12 (HS 437)
- Most wickets – Clarrie Grimmett 42 @ 27.40 (BB 8–57)

India

- Bombay Quadrangular – Europeans

New Zealand

- Plunket Shield – Wellington

South Africa

- Currie Cup – not contested

West Indies

- Inter-Colonial Tournament – Trinidad and Tobago

== Cycling ==
Tour de France

- Nicolas Frantz (Luxembourg) wins the 22nd Tour de France

== Field hockey ==
Olympic Games (Men's Competition)

- Gold Medal – India
- Silver Medal – Netherlands
- Bronze Medal – Germany

== Figure skating ==
World Figure Skating Championships

- World Women's Champion – Sonja Henie (Norway)
- World Men's Champion – Willi Böckel (Austria)
- World Pairs Champions – Andreé Joly-Brunet and Pierre Brunet (France)

== Golf ==
Major tournaments

- British Open – Walter Hagen
- US Open – Johnny Farrell
- USPGA Championship – Leo Diegel

Other tournaments

- British Amateur – Philip Perkins
- US Amateur – Bobby Jones

== Horse racing ==
England

- Champion Hurdle –Brown Jack
- Cheltenham Gold Cup – Patron Saint
- Grand National – Tipperary Tim
- 1,000 Guineas Stakes – Scuttle
- 2,000 Guineas Stakes – Flamingo
- The Derby – Felstead
- The Oaks – Toboggan
- St. Leger Stakes – Fairway

Australia

- Melbourne Cup – Statesman

Canada

- King's Plate – Young Kitty

France

- Prix de l'Arc de Triomphe – Kantar

Ireland

- Irish Grand National – Don Sancho
- Irish Derby Stakes – Baytown

USA

- Kentucky Derby – Reigh Count
- Preakness Stakes – Victorian
- Belmont Stakes – Vito

== Ice hockey ==
Stanley Cup

- 5–14 April — New York Rangers defeats Montreal Maroons in the 1928 Stanley Cup Finals by 3 games to 2

== Nordic skiing ==
Olympic Games (Men's Competition)

- Cross-country skiing (18 km) – gold medal: Johan Grøttumsbråten (Norway)
- Cross-country skiing (50 km) – gold medal: Per-Erik Hedlund (Sweden)
- Ski jumping – gold medal: Alf Andersen (Norway)
- Nordic combined – gold medal: Johan Grøttumsbråten (Norway)

== Olympic Games ==
1928 Winter Olympics

- The 1928 Winter Olympics takes place at St Moritz in Switzerland (February 11 - February 19)
- Norway wins the most medals (15) and the most gold medals (6)

1928 Summer Olympics

- The 1928 Summer Olympics takes place at Amsterdam (July 28 - August 12)
- United States wins the most medals (56) and the most gold medals (22)

== Radiosport ==
Events

- First ever organised radio contest is held: the ARRL International Relay Party, sponsored by the American Radio Relay League

== Rowing ==
The Boat Race

- 28 March — Cambridge wins the 80th Oxford and Cambridge Boat Race

== Rugby league ==
- 1928 Great Britain Lions tour

England

- Championship – Swinton
- Challenge Cup final – Swinton 5–3 Warrington at Central Park, Wigan
- Lancashire League Championship – Swinton
- Yorkshire League Championship – Leeds
- Lancashire County Cup – Swinton 5–2 Wigan
- Yorkshire County Cup – Dewsbury 8–2 Hull

Australia

- NSW Premiership – South Sydney 26–5 Eastern Suburbs (grand final)

== Rugby union ==
Five Nations Championship

- 41st Five Nations Championship series is won by England who complete the Grand Slam

== Snooker ==
World Championship

- 2nd World Snooker Championship is won by Joe Davis who defeats Fred Lawrence 16–13

== Speed skating ==
Speed Skating World Championships

- Men's All-round Champion – Clas Thunberg (Finland)

1928 Winter Olympics

- 500m – gold medal: Bernt Evensen (Norway)
- 1500m – gold medal: Clas Thunberg (Finland)
- 5000m – gold medal: Ivar Ballangrud (Norway)
- 10000m – cancelled due to thawing ice
- All-round – removed from program

== Tennis ==
Australia

- Australian Men's Singles Championship – Jean Borotra (France) defeats Jack Cummings (Australia) 6–4 6–1 4–6 5–7 6–3
- Australian Women's Singles Championship – Daphne Akhurst Cozens (Australia) defeats Esna Boyd Robertson (Australia) 7–5 6–2

England

- Wimbledon Men's Singles Championship – René Lacoste (France) defeats Henri Cochet (France) 6–1 4–6 6–4 6–2
- Wimbledon Women's Singles Championship – Helen Wills Moody (USA) defeats Lilí de Álvarez (Spain) 6–2 6–3

France

- French Men's Singles Championship – Henri Cochet (France) defeats René Lacoste (France) 5–7 6–3 6–1 6–3
- French Women's Singles Championship – Helen Wills Moody (USA) defeats Eileen Bennett Whittingstall (Great Britain) 6–1 6–2

USA

- American Men's Singles Championship – Henri Cochet (France) defeats Francis Hunter (USA) 4–6 6–4 3–6 7–5 6–3
- American Women's Singles Championship – Helen Wills Moody (USA) defeats Helen Jacobs (USA) 6–2 6–1

Davis Cup

- 1928 International Lawn Tennis Challenge – France 4–1 United States at Stade Roland Garros (clay) Paris, France
