= Sweden at the 1928 Winter Olympics =

- IOC code: SWE
- NOC: Swedish Olympic Committee
- Website: www.sok.se (in Swedish and English)

in St. Moritz
- Competitors: 24 (men) in 6 sports
- Flag bearers: Viking Harbom, ice hockey (official)
- Medals Ranked 3rd: Gold 2 Silver 2 Bronze 1 Total 5

Winter Olympics appearances (overview)
- 1924; 1928; 1932; 1936; 1948; 1952; 1956; 1960; 1964; 1968; 1972; 1976; 1980; 1984; 1988; 1992; 1994; 1998; 2002; 2006; 2010; 2014; 2018; 2022; 2026

Athletes from Sweden competed in the 1928 Winter Olympics in St. Moritz, Switzerland.

== Medalists ==
| Medal | Name | Sport | Event |
|---|---|---|---|
| Gold | Per-Erik Hedlund | Cross-country skiing | Men's 50 km |
| Gold | Gillis Grafström | Figure skating | Men's singles |
| Silver | Gustaf Jonsson | Cross-country skiing | Men's 50 km |
| Silver | Sweden men's national ice hockey team: Carl Abrahamsson; Emil Bergman; Birger Holmqvist; Gustaf Johansson; Henry Johansson; Nils Johansson; Ernst Karlberg; Erik Larsson; Bertil Linde; Sigfrid Öberg; Wilhelm Petersén; Kurt Sucksdorff | Ice hockey | Men's competition |
| Bronze | Volger Andersson | Cross-country skiing | Men's 50 km |

== Cross-country skiing ==
Men

| Event | Athlete | Race | |
| Event | Athlete | Time | Rank |
|---|---|---|---|
| 18 km | Volger Andersson | DNF | – |
| 18 km | Sven Utterström | 1'42:04 | 9 |
| 18 km | Lars-Theodor Jonsson | 1'41:59 | 7 |
| 18 km | Per-Erik Hedlund | 1'41:51 | 6 |
| 50 km | Anders Ström | 5'21:54 | 7 |
| 50 km | Volger Andersson | 5'05:46 | 3rd place, bronze medalist(s) |
| 50 km | Gustaf Jonsson | 5'05:30 | 2nd place, silver medalist(s) |
| 50 km | Per-Erik Hedlund | 4'52:03 | 1st place, gold medalist(s) |

== Figure skating ==
Men

| Athlete | Event | CF | FS | Places | Points | Final rank |
|---|---|---|---|---|---|---|
| Gillis Grafström | Men's singles | 1 | 1 | 12 | 1630.75 | 1st place, gold medalist(s) |

== Ice hockey ==
Summary

| Team | Event | First round | | | | Medal round | | | |
| Team | Event | Opposition Score | Opposition Score | Opposition Score | Rank | Opposition Score | Opposition Score | Opposition Score | Rank |
|---|---|---|---|---|---|---|---|---|---|
| Sweden men's | Men's tournament | Czechoslovakia; W 3–0 | Poland; T 2–2 | —N/a | 1 Q | Canada; L 0–11 | Switzerland; W 4–0 | Great Britain; W 3–1 | 2nd place, silver medalist(s) |

=== Group B ===
The top team (highlighted) advanced to the medal round.

| Team | GP | W | L | T | GF | GA |
|---|---|---|---|---|---|---|
| Sweden | 2 | 1 | 0 | 1 | 5 | 2 |
| Czechoslovakia | 2 | 1 | 1 | 0 | 3 | 5 |
| Poland | 2 | 0 | 1 | 1 | 4 | 5 |

| February 11 | Sweden | 3:0 (1:0,1:0,1:0) | Czechoslovakia |
| February 12 | Sweden | 2:2 (1:0,1:2,0:0) | Poland |

=== Medal round ===
The top teams from each of the three groups, plus Canada, which had received a bye into the medal round, played a 3-game round-robin to determine the medal winners.

| Team | GP | W | L | GF | GA |
|---|---|---|---|---|---|
| Canada | 3 | 3 | 0 | 38 | 0 |
| Sweden (silver) | 3 | 2 | 1 | 7 | 12 |
| Switzerland | 3 | 1 | 2 | 4 | 17 |
| Great Britain | 3 | 0 | 3 | 1 | 21 |

| February 17 | Canada | 11:0 (4:0,5:0,2:0) | Sweden |
| February 18 | Switzerland | 0:4 (0:1,0:0,0:3) | Sweden |
| February 19 | Sweden | 3:1 (2:1,0:0,1:0) | Great Britain |

| 2 | Sweden |
| | Carl Abrahamsson (Södertälje SK); Emil Bergman (Nacka SK); Birger Holmqvist (IK Göta); Gustaf Johansson (IK Göta); Henry Johansson (Södertälje SK); Nils Johansson (Djurgårdens IF); Ernst Karlberg (Djurgårdens IF); Erik Larsson (Hammarby IF); Bertil Linde (Karlbergs BK); Sigfrid Öberg (Hammarby IF); Wilhelm Petersén (Södertälje SK); Kurt Sucksdorff (IK Göta) |

== Nordic combined ==
Events:

- 18 km cross-country skiing
- normal hill ski jumping

The cross-country skiing part of this event was combined with the main medal event of cross-country skiing. Those results can be found above in this article in the cross-country skiing section. Some athletes (but not all) entered in both the cross-country skiing and Nordic combined event, their time on the 18 km was used for both events. One would expect that athletes competing at the Nordic combined event, would participate in the cross-country skiing event as well, as they would have the opportunity to win more than one medal. This was not always the case due to the maximum number of athletes that could represent a country per event.

The ski jumping (normal hill) event was held separate from the main medal event of ski jumping, results can be found in the table below.

| Athlete | Event | Cross-country | | | Ski Jumping | | | | Total | |
| Athlete | Event | Time | Points | Rank | Distance 1 | Distance 2 | Total points | Rank | Points | Rank |
|---|---|---|---|---|---|---|---|---|---|---|
| Sven Eriksson | Individual | 1'52:20 | 12.375 | 11 | 51.5 | 57.5 | 16.312 | 5 | 14.593 | 6 |

== Ski jumping ==
| Athlete | Event | Jump 1 (Dist.) | Jump 2 (Dist.) | Total | |
| Athlete | Event | Jump 1 (Dist.) | Jump 2 (Dist.) | Points | Rank |
|---|---|---|---|---|---|
| Sven-Olof Lundgren | Normal hill | 48.0 | 59.0 | 16.708 | 5 |
| Bertil Carlsson | Normal hill | 51.5 | 61.0 | 16.187 | 10 |
| Sven Eriksson | Normal hill | 52.0 | 62.5 (fall) | 11.500 | 31 |
| Axel-Herman Nilsson | Normal hill | 53.5 | 60.0 | 16.937 | 4 |

== Speed skating ==
Men

| Athlete | Event | Race | |
| Athlete | Event | Time | Rank |
|---|---|---|---|
| Gustaf Andersson | 500 m | 47.9 | 23 |
| Gustaf Andersson | 1500 m | 2:27.5 | 9 |
| Gustaf Andersson | 5000 m | 9:09.7 | 9 |
