= Nordic combined at the 1928 Winter Olympics =

Nordic combined at the II Olympic Winter Games
- Venue: Olympiaschanze St. Moritz (ski jumping); Around the hills of St. Moritz (cross-country skiing)
- Dates: 17–18 February 1928
- Competitors: 35 from 14 nations
- Winning Score: 17.833

Medalists
1st place, gold medalist(s)		Johan Grøttumsbraaten	Norway
2nd place, silver medalist(s)		Hans Vinjarengen	Norway
3rd place, bronze medalist(s)		Jon Snersrud	Norway

At the 1928 Winter Olympics one individual Nordic combined event was contested. It was held on Friday, February 17, 1928 (cross-country skiing) and on Saturday, February 18, 1928 (ski jumping). Unlike today the ski jump was the last event held. Both events were also individual medal events.

== Medalists ==
Gold	Silver	Bronze
Johan Grøttumsbråten; Norway	Hans Vinjarengen; Norway	Jon Snersrud; Norway

== Results ==
=== Final standings ===
Place	Competitor	Total
1	Johan Grøttumsbråten (NOR)	17.833
2	Hans Vinjarengen (NOR)	15.303
3	Jon Snersrud (NOR)	15.021
4	Paavo Nuotio (FIN)	14.927
5	Esko Järvinen (FIN)	14.810
6	Sven Eriksson (SWE)	14.593
7	Ludwig Böck (GER)	13.260
8	Ole Kolterud (NOR)	13.146
9	Otakar Německý (TCH)	12.990
10	Bronisław Czech (POL)	12.645
11	Adolf Rubi (SUI)	12.625
12	Rudolf Burkert (TCH)	12.604
13	Stephan Lauener (SUI)	12.333
14	Max Kröckel (GER)	11.968
15	Walter Glaß (GER)	11.927
16	David Zogg (SUI)	11.906
17	Harald Paumgarten (AUT)	11.854
18	Walter Buchberger (TCH)	10.906
19	Hans Eidenbenz (SUI)	10.551
20	Vitale Venzi (ITA)	10.416
21	Gustl Müller (GER)	10.114
22	Aleksander Rozmus (POL)	8.781
23	Martial Payot (FRA)	7.896
24	Stanisław Motyka (POL)	7.531
25	Anders Haugen (USA)	7.447
26	Charles Proctor (USA)	7.208
27	Merritt Putman (CAN)	4.853
28	Klébert Balmat (FRA)	4.291
—	Marcel Beraud (FRA)	DNF
—	Sakuta Takefushi (JPN)	DNF
—	William Thompson (CAN)	DNF
—	Franz Wende (TCH)	DNF
—	Karl Neuner (GER)	DNF
—	Gyula Szepes (HUN)	DNF
—	Rolf Monsen (USA)	DNF

== Participating nations ==
A total of 35 Nordic combined skiers from 14 nations competed at the St. Moritz Games:

- Austria (1)
- Canada (2)
- Czechoslovakia (4)
- Finland (2)
- France (3)
- Germany (5)
- Hungary (1)
- Italy (1)
- Japan (1)
- Norway (4)
- Poland (3)
- Sweden (1)
- Switzerland (4)
- United States (3)
