= Norway at the 1928 Winter Olympics =

- IOC code: NOR
- NOC: Norwegian National Federation of Sports

in St. Moritz
- Competitors: 26 (23 men, 3 women) in 5 sports
- Flag bearer: Ole Reistad (Military patrol)
- Medals Ranked 1st: Gold 6 Silver 4 Bronze 5 Total 15

Winter Olympics appearances (overview)
- 1924; 1928; 1932; 1936; 1948; 1952; 1956; 1960; 1964; 1968; 1972; 1976; 1980; 1984; 1988; 1992; 1994; 1998; 2002; 2006; 2010; 2014; 2018; 2022; 2026

Norway was represented at the 1928 Winter Olympics in St. Moritz, Switzerland by the Norwegian Olympic Committee and Confederation of Sports.

The Games marked the second Winter Olympics since their inception in 1924. In total, 26 athletes including 23 men and three women represented Norway in five different sports including cross-country skiing, figure skating, Nordic combined, ski jumping and speed skating.

Norway again ranked first in the medal count after winning six gold, four silver and five bronze medals.

== Competitors ==
In total, 26 athletes including 23 men and three women represented Norway at the 1928 Winter Olympics in St. Moritz, Switzerland.

Sport	Men	Women	Total
Cross-country skiing	7	0	7
Figure skating	0	3	3
Nordic combined	4	0	4
Ski jumping	4	0	4
Speed skating	8	0	8
Total	23	3	26

== Medalists ==
During the course of the games, Norway won six gold, four silver and five bronze medals. Norway came top of the medal table having won four more golds than any other country. Their total of 15 medals was also nine more than any other country.

Along with Finland's Clas Thunberg, Johan Grøttumsbraaten was the joint most successful athlete at the games after winning two gold medals. Bernt Evensen won three medals in total, the most of any athlete, after earning a gold, a silver and a bronze.

Medal	Name	Sport	Event
Gold	Johan Grøttumsbraaten	Cross-country skiing	Men's 18 km
Gold	Sonja Henie	Figure skating	Women's singles
Gold	Johan Grøttumsbraaten	Nordic combined	Men's individual
Gold	Alf Andersen	Ski jumping	Men's normal hill
Gold	Bernt Evensen	Speed skating	Men's 500m
Gold	Ivar Ballangrud	Speed skating	Men's 5000m
Silver	Ole Hegge	Cross-country skiing	Men's 18 km
Silver	Hans Vinjarengen	Nordic combined	Men's individual
Silver	Sigmund Ruud	Ski jumping	Men's normal hill
Silver	Bernt Evensen	Speed skating	Men's 1500m
Bronze	Reidar Ødegaard	Cross-country skiing	Men's 18 km
Bronze	Jon Snersrud	Nordic combined	Men's individual
Bronze	Roald Larsen	Speed skating	Men's 500m
Bronze	Ivar Ballangrud	Speed skating	Men's 1500m
Bronze	Bernt Evensen	Speed skating	Men's 5000m

== Cross-country skiing ==
Men's cross-country skiing
Event	Athlete	Race	
Event	Athlete	Time	Rank
18 km	Hagbart Haakonsen	1'41:29	5
18 km	Reidar Ødegaard	1'40:11	3rd place, bronze medalist(s)
18 km	Ole Hegge	1'39:01	2nd place, silver medalist(s)
18 km	Johan Grøttumsbraaten	1'37:01	1st place, gold medalist(s)
50 km	John Røen	DNF	–
50 km	Johan Støa	5'25:30	8
50 km	Ole Hegge	5'17:58	5
50 km	Olav Kjelbotn	5'14:22	4

== Figure skating ==
Women's figure skating
Athlete	Event	CF	FS	Places	Points	Final rank
Karen Simensen	Women's singles	12	18	103	1811.75	16
Edel Randem	Women's singles	13	15	94	1880.75	13
Sonja Henie	Women's singles	1	1	8	2452.25	1st place, gold medalist(s)

== Nordic combined ==
Events:

- 18 km cross-country skiing
- normal hill ski jumping

The cross-country skiing part of this event was combined with the main medal event of cross-country skiing. Those results can be found above in this article in the cross-country skiing section. Some athletes (but not all) entered in both the cross-country skiing and Nordic combined event, their time on the 18 km was used for both events. One would expect that athletes competing at the Nordic combined event, would participate in the cross-country skiing event as well, as they would have the opportunity to win more than one medal. This was not always the case due to the maximum number of athletes that could represent a country per event.

The ski jumping (normal hill) event was held separate from the main medal event of ski jumping, results can be found in the table below.

Athlete	Event	Cross-country			Ski Jumping				Total	
Athlete	Event	Time	Points	Rank	Distance 1	Distance 2	Total points	Rank	Points	Rank
Jon Snersrud	Individual	1'50:51	13.125	9	60.5	52.0	16.917	3	15.021	3rd place, bronze medalist(s)
Ole Kolterud	Individual	1'50:17	13.375	7	59.0	65.5 (fall)	12.917	18	13.146	8
Hans Vinjarengen	Individual	1'41:44	17.750	2	59.5 (fall)	61.0	12.854	19	15.302	2nd place, silver medalist(s)
Johan Grøttumsbraaten	Individual	1'37:01	20.000	1	49.5	56.0	15.667	8	17.833	1st place, gold medalist(s)

== Ski jumping ==
Ski jumping
Athlete	Event	Jump 1 (Dist.)	Jump 2 (Dist.)	Total	
Athlete	Event	Jump 1 (Dist.)	Jump 2 (Dist.)	Points	Rank
Hans Kleppen	Normal hill	56.5 (fall)	64.5 (fall)	6.500	36
Jacob Tullin Thams	Normal hill	56.5	73.0 (fall)	12.562	28
Sigmund Ruud	Normal hill	57.5	62.5	18.542	2nd place, silver medalist(s)
Alf Andersen	Normal hill	60.0	64.0	19.208	1st place, gold medalist(s)

== Speed skating ==
Men's speedskating
Event	Athlete	Race	
Event	Athlete	Time	Rank
500 m	Oskar Olsen	44.7	9
500 m	Haakon Pedersen	43.8	6
500 m	Roald Larsen	43.6	3rd place, bronze medalist(s)
500 m	Bernt Evensen	43.4 OR	1st place, gold medalist(s)
1500 m	Wollert Nygren	2:28.7	13
1500 m	Roald Larsen	2:25.3	4
1500 m	Ivar Ballangrud	2:22.6	3rd place, bronze medalist(s)
1500 m	Bernt Evensen	2:21.9	2nd place, silver medalist(s)
5000 m	Michael Staksrud	9:07.3	7
5000 m	Armand Carlsen	9:01.5	5
5000 m	Bernt Evensen	9:01.1	3rd place, bronze medalist(s)
5000 m	Ivar Ballangrud	8:50.5	1st place, gold medalist(s)
