= Ville Mattila =

Finnish cross-country skier

Herman Vilhelm "Ville" Mattila (March 9, 1903 – July 11, 1987) was a Finnish cross-country skier who competed in the 1928 Winter Olympics.

He was born and died in Haapavesi.

In 1928 he finished tenth in the 18 kilometre competition.

== Cross-country skiing results ==
=== Olympic Games ===
Year	Age	18 km	50 km
1928	24	10	—
