= Einar Mässeli =

Finnish cross-country skier

Einar Mässeli (4 January 1898 – 4 December 1966) was a Finnish cross-country skier who competed in the 1928 Winter Olympics.

He was born in Säkäjärvi, Virolahti and died in Virolahti.

In 1928 he finished 13th in the 18 km competition.

== Cross-country skiing results ==
=== Olympic Games ===
| Year | Age | 18 km | 50 km |
|---|---|---|---|
| 1928 | 30 | 13 | — |
