= Nordic skiing at the 1928 Winter Olympics =

At the 1928 Winter Olympics, four Nordic skiing events were contested – two cross-country skiing events, one ski jumping event, and one Nordic combined event, all for men only.

Johan Grøttumsbråten of Norway won both the 18 km in cross-country skiing and the Nordic combined. Per-Erik Hedlund of Sweden won the 50 km in cross-country skiing. Alf Andersen of Sweden won the large hill in ski jumping.

Nordic skiing discipline	Men's events
Cross-country skiing	• 18 km
Cross-country skiing	• 50 km
Ski jumping	• Large hill
Nordic combined	• Individual
