= Anders Ström =

Swedish cross-country skier

Personal information
- Born: 21 August 1901 Östnor, Sweden
- Died: 20 September 1986 (aged 85) Östnor, Sweden

Sport
- Country: Sweden
- Sport: cross-country skiing

Anders Ström (21 August 1901, Östnor, Sweden – 20 September 1986 in Östnor, Sweden) was a Swedish cross-country skier who competed in the 1928 Winter Olympics, where he finished seventh in the 50 km event. In 1931, he won Vasaloppet.

== Cross-country skiing results ==
=== Olympic Games ===
Year	Age	18 km	50 km
1928	26	—	7
