= Cross-country skiing at the 1928 Winter Olympics – Men's 50 kilometre =

Men's 50 kilometres at the II Olympic Winter Games
- Date: 14 February 1928
- Competitors: 41 from 11 nations
- Winning time: 4:52:03

Medalists
| 1st place, gold medalist(s) | | Per-Erik Hedlund | Sweden |
| 2nd place, silver medalist(s) | | Gustaf Jonsson | Sweden |
| 3rd place, bronze medalist(s) | | Volger Andersson | Sweden |

The 50 kilometre cross-country skiing event was part of the cross-country skiing at the 1928 Winter Olympics programme. It was the second appearance of the event. The competition was held on Tuesday, 14 February 1928. Forty-one cross-country skiers from eleven nations competed.

== Medalists ==
| Gold | Silver | Bronze |
|---|---|---|
| Per-Erik Hedlund; Sweden | Gustaf Jonsson; Sweden | Volger Andersson; Sweden |

== Results ==
Hedlund's margin of victory is the largest in Olympic history (13 minutes, 27 seconds).

| Place | Competitor | Time |
|---|---|---|
| 1 | Per-Erik Hedlund (SWE) | 4'52:03 |
| 2 | Gustaf Jonsson (SWE) | 5'05:30 |
| 3 | Volger Andersson (SWE) | 5'05:46 |
| 4 | Olav Kjelbotn (NOR) | 5'14:22 |
| 5 | Ole Hegge (NOR) | 5'17:58 |
| 6 | Tauno Lappalainen (FIN) | 5'18:33 |
| 7 | Anders Ström (SWE) | 5'21:54 |
| 8 | Johan Støa (NOR) | 5'25:30 |
| 9 | Martti Lappalainen (FIN) | 5'30:09 |
| 10 | Otto Wahl (GER) | 5'34:02 |
| 11 | Josef Německý (TCH) | 5'35:46 |
| 12 | Hans Bauer (GER) | 5'36:21 |
| 13 | Andrzej Krzeptowski (POL) | 5'36:55 |
| 14 | Franz Donth (TCH) | 5'37:36 |
| 15 | Walter Bussmann (SUI) | 5'38:49 |
| 16 | Fritz Pellkofer (GER) | 5'41:00 |
| 17 | Robert Wampfler (SUI) | 5'42:40 |
| 18 | Václav Fišera (TCH) | 5'42:55 |
| 19 | Józef Bujak (POL) | 5'44:19 |
| 20 | Matteo Demetz (ITA) | 5'47:47 |
| 21 | Ferdinando Glück (ITA) | 5'49:52 |
| 22 | Carlo Gourlaouen (SUI) | 5'55:09 |
| 23 | Joško Janša (YUG) | 5'58:09 |
| 24 | Minoru Nagata (JPN) | 6'02:24 |
| 25 | Akira Takahashi (JPN) | 6'05:25 |
| 26 | Sakuta Takebushi (JPN) | 6'05:50 |
| 27 | Franciszek Kawa (POL) | 6'11:08 |
| 28 | Stane Kmet (YUG) | 6'32:07 |
| 29 | Janko Janša (YUG) | 6'34:59 |
| 30 | Stane Bervar (YUG) | 6'46:48 |
| – | Adiel Paananen (FIN) | DNF |
| – | Matti Raivio (FIN) | DNF |
| – | André Médy (FRA) | DNF |
| – | Henri Millan (FRA) | DNF |
| – | Évariste Prat (FRA) | DNF |
| – | Camille Tournier (FRA) | DNF |
| – | Takeharu Aso (JPN) | DNF |
| – | John Røen (NOR) | DNF |
| – | Stanisław Wilczyński (POL) | DNF |
| – | Hans Zeier (SUI) | DNF |
| – | Josef Feistauer (TCH) | DNF |
