= Yugoslavia at the 1928 Winter Olympics =

- Flag of the Kingdom of Serbs, Croats and Slovenes
- IOC code: YUG
- NOC: Yugoslav Olympic Committee

in St. Moritz
- Competitors: 6 in 1 sport
- Medals: Gold 0 Silver 0 Bronze 0 Total 0

Winter Olympics appearances (overview)
- 1924; 1928; 1932; 1936; 1948; 1952; 1956; 1960; 1964; 1968; 1972; 1976; 1980; 1984; 1988; 1992; 1994; 1998; 2002

Other related appearances
- Croatia (1992–); Slovenia (1992–); Bosnia and Herzegovina (1994–); North Macedonia (1998–); Serbia and Montenegro (1998–2006); Montenegro (2010–); Serbia (2010–); Kosovo (2018–)

The Kingdom of Serbs, Croats and Slovenes was represented at the 1928 Winter Olympics in St. Moritz, Switzerland with a delegation of six competitors.

== Cross-country skiing ==
Men

| Event | Athlete | Race | |
| Event | Athlete | Time | Rank |
|---|---|---|---|
| 18 km | Boris Režek | 2'28:44 | 42 |
| 18 km | Janko Janša | 2'19:54 | 40 |
| 18 km | Petar Klofutar | 2'14:08 | 39 |
| 18 km | Joško Janša | 2'01:14 | 26 |
| 50 km | Stane Bervar | 6'46:48 | 30 |
| 50 km | Janko Janša | 6'34:59 | 29 |
| 50 km | Stane Kmet | 6'32:07 | 28 |
| 50 km | Joško Janša | 5'58:09 | 23 |
