= Hagbart Haakonsen =

Norwegian cross-country skier

Hagbart Haakonsen (born 15 November 1895; died 20 January 1984) was a Norwegian cross-country skier.

He was born in Grue, Norway.

Haakonsen shared the Holmenkollen medal with Einar Lindboe in 1927. Haakonsen finished fifth in 18 km cross country event at the 1928 Winter Olympics as well as at the 1929 FIS Nordic World Ski Championships. He was the first true cross-country skier to win the Holmenkollen medal.

== Cross-country skiing results ==
All results are sourced from the International Ski Federation (FIS).

=== Olympic Games ===
Year	Age	18 km	50 km
1928	32	5	—

=== World Championships ===
Year	Age	17 km	50 km
1929	33	5	17
1930	34	20	—
