= Japan at the 1928 Winter Olympics =

- IOC code: JPN
- NOC: Japanese Olympic Committee
- Website: www.joc.or.jp (in Japanese and English)

in St. Moritz
- Competitors: 6 (men) in 3 sports
- Flag bearer: Subaru Takahashi
- Medals: Gold 0 Silver 0 Bronze 0 Total 0

Winter Olympics appearances (overview)
- 1928; 1932; 1936; 1948; 1952; 1956; 1960; 1964; 1968; 1972; 1976; 1980; 1984; 1988; 1992; 1994; 1998; 2002; 2006; 2010; 2014; 2018; 2022; 2026

Japan competed at the Winter Olympic Games for the first time at the 1928 Winter Olympics in St. Moritz, Switzerland.

== Cross-country skiing ==
Men

Event	Athlete	Race	
Event	Athlete	Time	Rank
18 km	Subaru Takahashi	2'10:57	37
18 km	Minoru Nagata	2'04:23	32
18 km	Sakuta Takefushi	2'04:20	31
18 km	Takeo Yazawa	2'02:29	27
50 km	Takeji Aso	DNF	–
50 km	Sakuta Takefushi	6'08:50	26
50 km	Subaru Takahashi	6'05:25	25
50 km	Minoru Nagata	6'02:24	24

== Nordic combined ==
Events:

- 18 km cross-country skiing
- normal hill ski jumping

The cross-country skiing part of this event was combined with the main medal event of cross-country skiing. Those results can be found above in this article in the cross-country skiing section. Some athletes (but not all) entered in both the cross-country skiing and Nordic combined event, their time on the 18 km was used for both events. One would expect that athletes competing at the Nordic combined event, would participate in the cross-country skiing event as well, as they would have the opportunity to win more than one medal. This was not always the case due to the maximum number of athletes that could represent a country per event.

The ski jumping (normal hill) event was held separate from the main medal event of ski jumping, results can be found in the table below.

Athlete	Event	Cross-country			Ski Jumping				Total	
Athlete	Event	Time	Points	Rank	Distance 1	Distance 2	Total points	Rank	Points	Rank
Sakuta Takefushi	Individual	DNF	–	–	–	–	–	–	DNF	–

== Ski jumping ==
Athlete	Event	Jump 1 (Dist.)	Jump 2 (Dist.)	Total	
Athlete	Event	Jump 1 (Dist.)	Jump 2 (Dist.)	Points	Rank
Motohiko Ban	Normal hill	34.0 (fall)	39.0	4.000	38
