= Italy at the 1928 Winter Olympics =

- IOC code: ITA
- NOC: Italian National Olympic Committee
- Website: www.coni.it (in Italian)

in St. Moritz
- Competitors: 13 (men) in 5 sports
- Flag bearer: Ferdinando Glück
- Medals: Gold 0 Silver 0 Bronze 0 Total 0

Winter Olympics appearances (overview)
- 1924; 1928; 1932; 1936; 1948; 1952; 1956; 1960; 1964; 1968; 1972; 1976; 1980; 1984; 1988; 1992; 1994; 1998; 2002; 2006; 2010; 2014; 2018; 2022; 2026

Italy competed at the 1928 Winter Olympics in St. Moritz, Switzerland.

== Bobsleigh ==
Sled	Athletes	Event	Run 1		Run 2		Total	
Sled	Athletes	Event	Time	Rank	Time	Rank	Time	Rank
ITA	Giancarlo Murpugo; Carlo Sem; Luigi Cerutti; Giuseppe Crivelli; Piero Marchetti	Five-man	1:45.0	17	1:49.6	21	3:34.6	21

== Cross-country skiing ==
Men

Event	Athlete	Race	
Event	Athlete	Time	Rank
18 km	Vitale Venzi	2'09:38	35
18 km	Giovanni Testa	2'08:49	34
18 km	Matthäus Demetz	1'57:08	22
50 km	Ferdinando Glück	5'49:52	21
50 km	Matthäus Demetz	5'47:47	20

== Nordic combined ==
Events:

- 18 km cross-country skiing
- normal hill ski jumping

The cross-country skiing part of this event was combined with the main medal event of cross-country skiing. Those results can be found above in this article in the cross-country skiing section. Some athletes (but not all) entered in both the cross-country skiing and Nordic combined event, their time on the 18 km was used for both events. One would expect that athletes competing at the Nordic combined event, would participate in the cross-country skiing event as well, as they would have the opportunity to win more than one medal. This was not always the case due to the maximum number of athletes that could represent a country per event.

The ski jumping (normal hill) event was held separate from the main medal event of ski jumping, results can be found in the table below.

Athlete	Event	Cross-country			Ski Jumping				Total	
Athlete	Event	Time	Points	Rank	Distance 1	Distance 2	Total points	Rank	Points	Rank
Vitale Venzi	Individual	2'09:28	3.875	22	52.0	60.5	16.958	2	10.416	20

== Skeleton ==
Athlete	Run 1		Run 2		Run 3		Total	
Athlete	Time	Rank	Time	Rank	Time	Rank	Time	Rank
Alessandro del Torso	1:05.6	7	1:04.7	7	1:04.6	7	3:14.9	7
Agostino Lanfranchi	1:02.1	3	1:02.4	4	1:04.2	5	3:08.7	4

== Ski jumping ==
Athlete	Event	Jump 1 (Dist.)	Jump 2 (Dist.)	Total	
Athlete	Event	Jump 1 (Dist.)	Jump 2 (Dist.)	Points	Rank
Luigi Bernasconi	Normal hill	46.5	59.0 (fall)	10.020	33
Luciano Zampatti	Normal hill	48.0 (fall)	49.5	9.687	34
Vitale Venzi	Normal hill	50.0	59.0	15.750	13
