= Josef Feistauer =

Czech cross-country skier

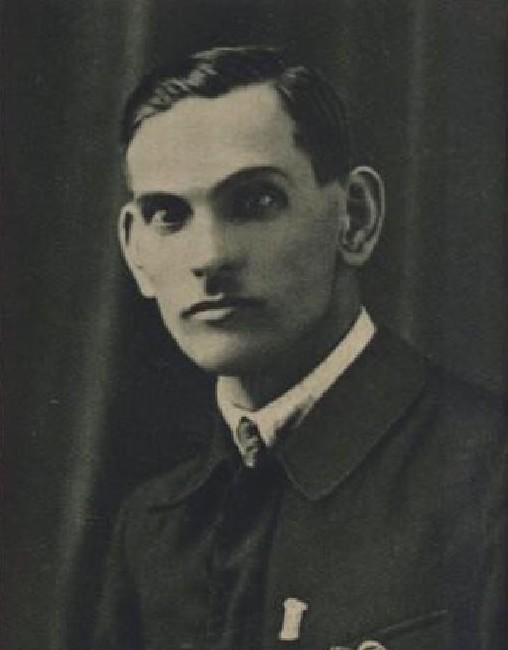

Personal information
- Nationality: Czech
- Born: 6 August 1893; Benecko, Austria-Hungary
- Died: 1972 (aged 78–79)

Sport
- Sport: Cross-country skiing

Josef Feistauer (6 August 1893 – 1972) was a Czechoslovak cross-country skier. He competed in the men's 50 kilometre event at the 1928 Winter Olympics.
