= Paul Simond =

French cross-country skier

Personal information
- Nationality: French

Sport
- Sport: Cross-country skiing

Paul Simond was a French cross-country skier. He competed in the men's 18 kilometre event at the 1928 Winter Olympics.
