= Janko Janša =

Slovenian cross-country skier

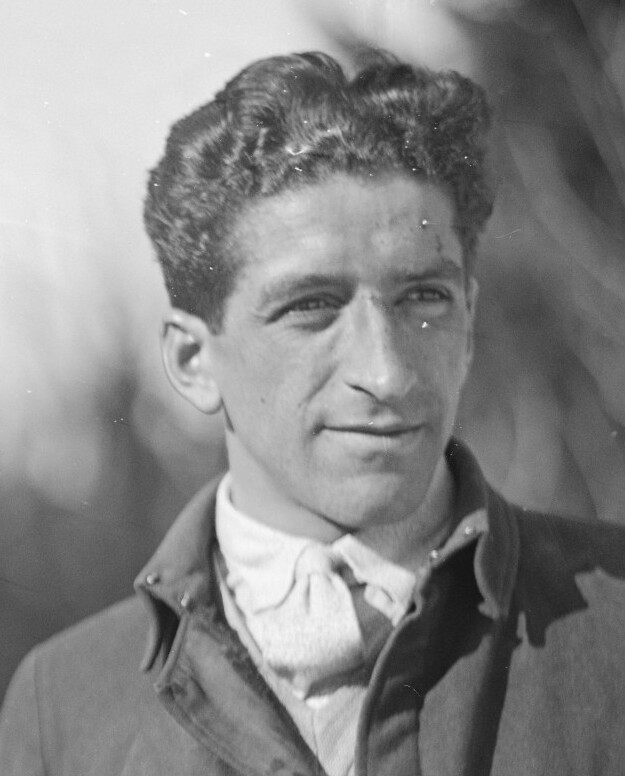

Personal information
- Nationality: Slovenian
- Born: 19 July 1900 Mojstrana, Austria-Hungary

Sport
- Sport: Cross-country skiing

Janko Janša (born 1900, date of death unknown) was a Slovenian cross-country skier.

He was born in the village of Dovje near Kranjska Gora. He competed in cross-country skiing in the 1928 Winter Olympics and reached the 40th position in the men's 18 kilometre event and the 29th position in the men's 50 kilometre event.

Janša was coaching the Slovenian cross-country skiing team in preparation for the 1948 Winter Olympics.

His brother Joško Janša was also an Olympic cross-country skier.
