= Max Kröckel =

German skier

Max Kröckel (1901–1986) was a German skier. He was born in Neuhaus am Rennweg. He competed at the 1928 Winter Olympics in St. Moritz, where he placed 14th in Nordic combined.
