= KMET =

KMET may refer to:

- KMET (AM), a radio station (1490 AM) licensed to Banning, California, United States
- KMET (FM), a defunct FM radio station located in Los Angeles, California, United States
- "KMET", fictional call sign of Met Radio, an online station based at Metropolitan State University of Denver
- Konferenz des Mitteleuropaeischen Turfs, a horse racing conference in Central Europe

== See also ==
- Kmet, a surname
