= Józef Bujak =

Polish cross-country skier

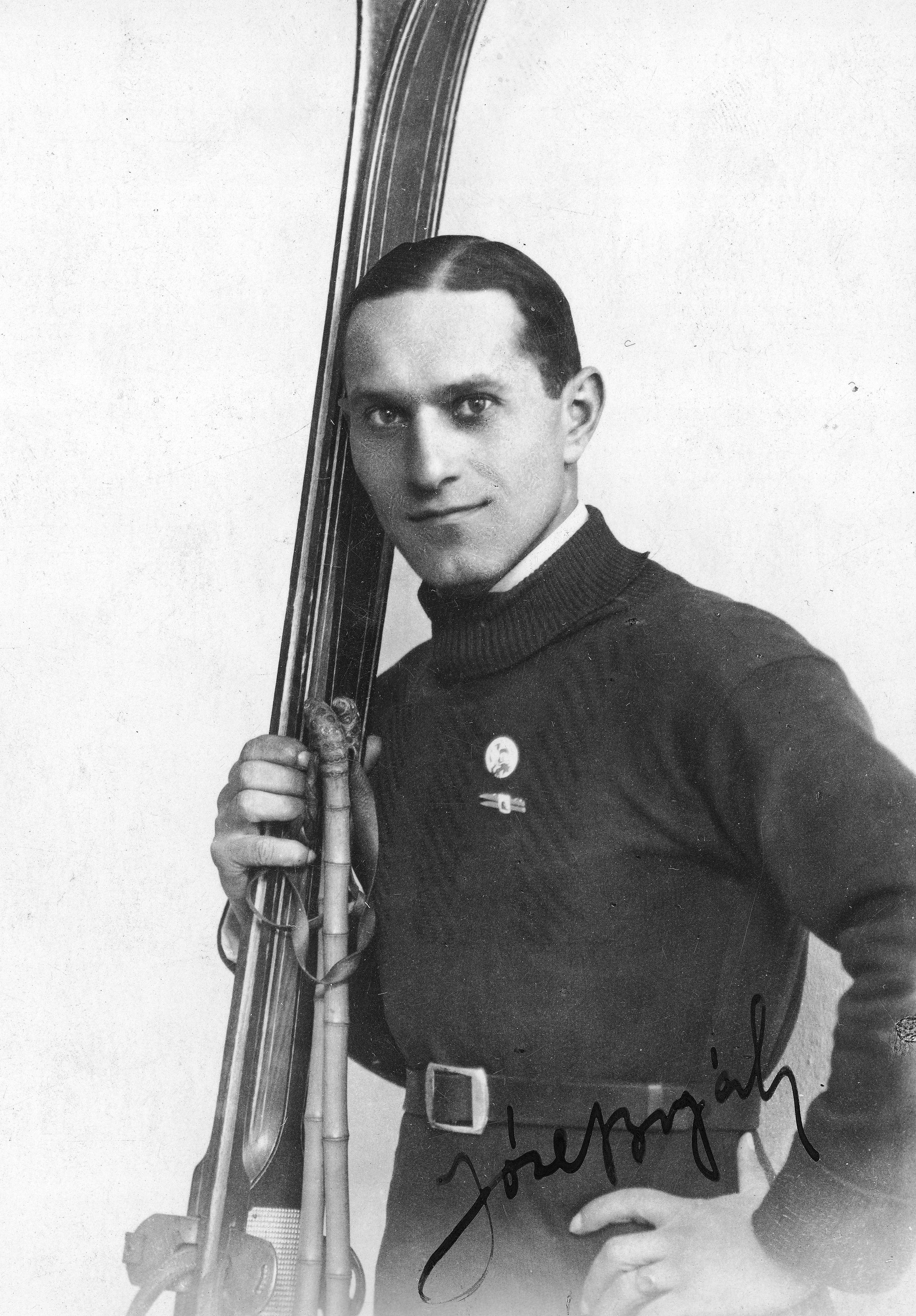

Józef Bujak (31 October 1898 – 22 April 1949) was a Polish cross-country skier who competed in the 1928 Winter Olympics.

He was born and died in Zakopane.

In 1928 he finished 18th in the 18 kilometre event and 19th in the 50 kilometre competition.
