= Carlo Gourlaouen =

Swiss cross-country skier

Personal information
- Nationality: Swiss
- Born: 27 July 1899
- Died: September 1946 (aged 47)

Sport
- Sport: Cross-country skiing

Carlo Gourlaouen (27 July 1899 – September 1946) was a Swiss cross-country skier. He competed in the men's 50 kilometre event at the 1928 Winter Olympics.
