= Hans Zeier =

Swiss cross-country skier

Personal information
- Nationality: Swiss
- Born: 24 April 1899; Lucerne, Switzerland
- Died: 11 August 1989 (aged 90); Lucerne, Switzerland

Sport
- Sport: Cross-country skiing

Hans Zeier (24 April 1899 – 11 August 1989) was a Swiss cross-country skier. He competed in the men's 50 kilometre event at the 1928 Winter Olympics.
