= Johan Støa (sportsperson) =

Norwegian multi-sportsman (1900 – 1991)

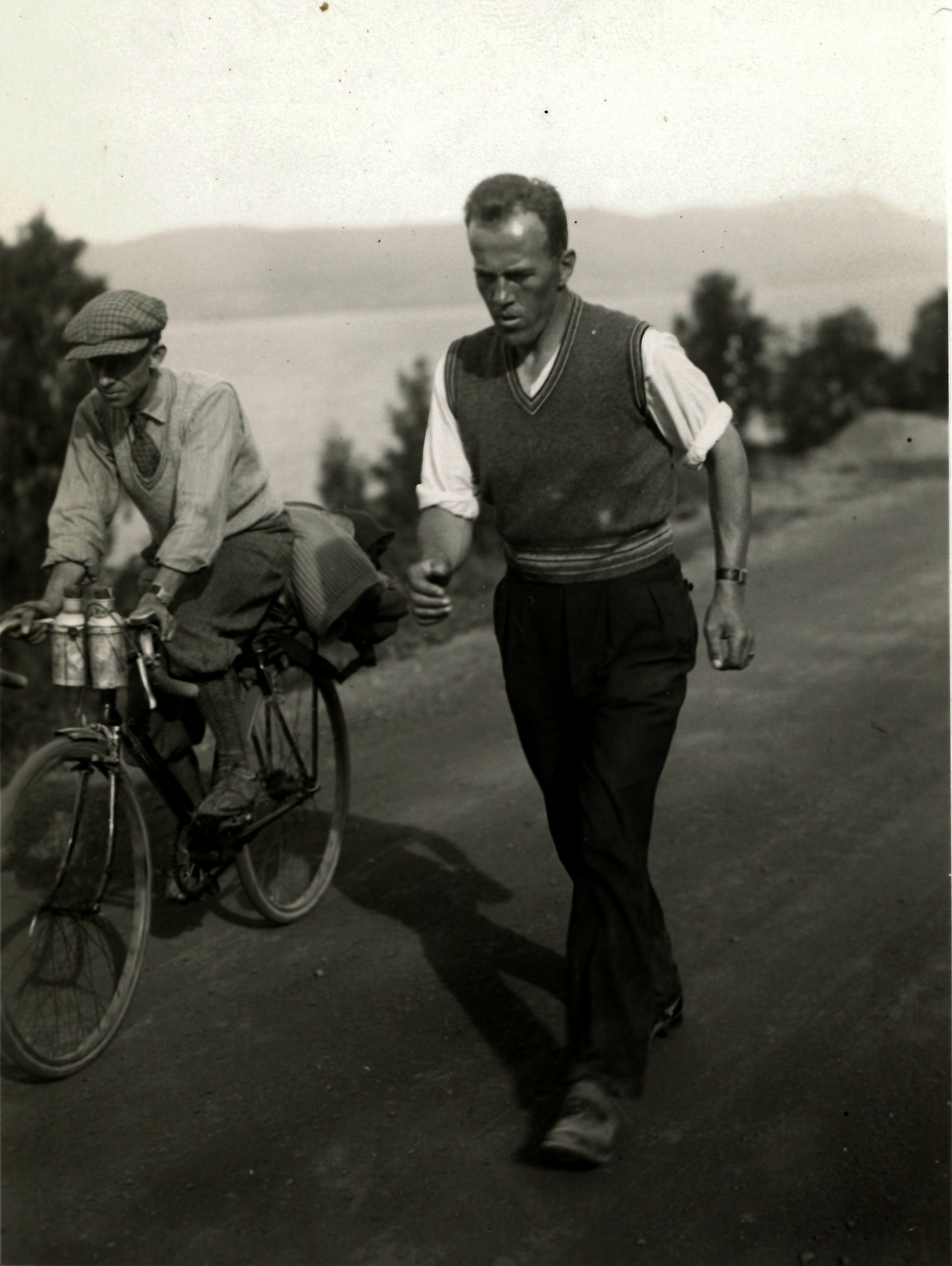
Johan Støa walking from Trondheim to Oslo in 1933

Johan Støa (13 June 1900 – 29 October 1991) was a Norwegian multi-sportsman. He competed as athlete (marathon runner), cross-country skier, ski jumper, cyclist, swimmer, footballer, and boxer.

He was born in Råstad and died in Drammen.

In February 1928 he finished eighth in the 50 kilometre cross-country skiing event at the Winter Olympics at St. Moritz.

Then in August 1928 he finished 36th in the Olympic marathon at the Summer Olympics at Amsterdam.

== Cross-country skiing results ==
=== Olympic Games ===
Year	Age	18 km	50 km
1928	27	—	8
