= Buchberger =

Buchberger may refer to:

== People ==
- Bruno Buchberger (born 1942), professor of computer mathematics at Johannes Kepler University
- Hubert Buchberger (born 1951), German violinist, conductor and music university teacher
- Kelly Buchberger (born 1966), Canadian professional ice hockey coach and former player
- Kerri Buchberger (born 1970), retired female volleyball player from Canada
- Michael Buchberger (1874–1961), Roman Catholic priest
- Walter Buchberger (1895–1970), Czechoslovak skier of German ethnicity

== Other ==
- Buchberger Leite, a gorge near Hohenau in the Lower Bavarian county of Freyung-Grafenau in Bavaria
- Buchberger's algorithm, a method of transforming a given set of generators for a polynomial ideal into a Gröbner basis with respect to some monomial order
