= Walter Glaß =

German skier

Walter Glaß (1905–1981) was a German skier. He was born in Klingenthal. He competed at the 1928 Winter Olympics in St. Moritz, where he placed 15th in Nordic combined.
