= Sucksdorff =

Sucksdorff is a surname. Notable people with the surname include:

- Arne Sucksdorff (1917–2001), Swedish film director
- Kurt Sucksdorff (1904–1960), Swedish ice hockey goaltender
