= Fritz Pellkofer =

German cross-country skier (1902–1943)

Personal information
- Nationality: German
- Born: 3 August 1902; Bayrischzell, German Empire
- Died: 23 January 1943 (aged 40); Rossosh, Soviet Union

Sport
- Sport: Cross-country skiing

Fritz Pellkofer (3 August 1902 – 23 January 1943) was a German cross-country skier. He competed in the men's 50 kilometre event at the 1928 Winter Olympics. He was declared missing in action during World War II.
