= František Fišera =

Czech cross-country skier

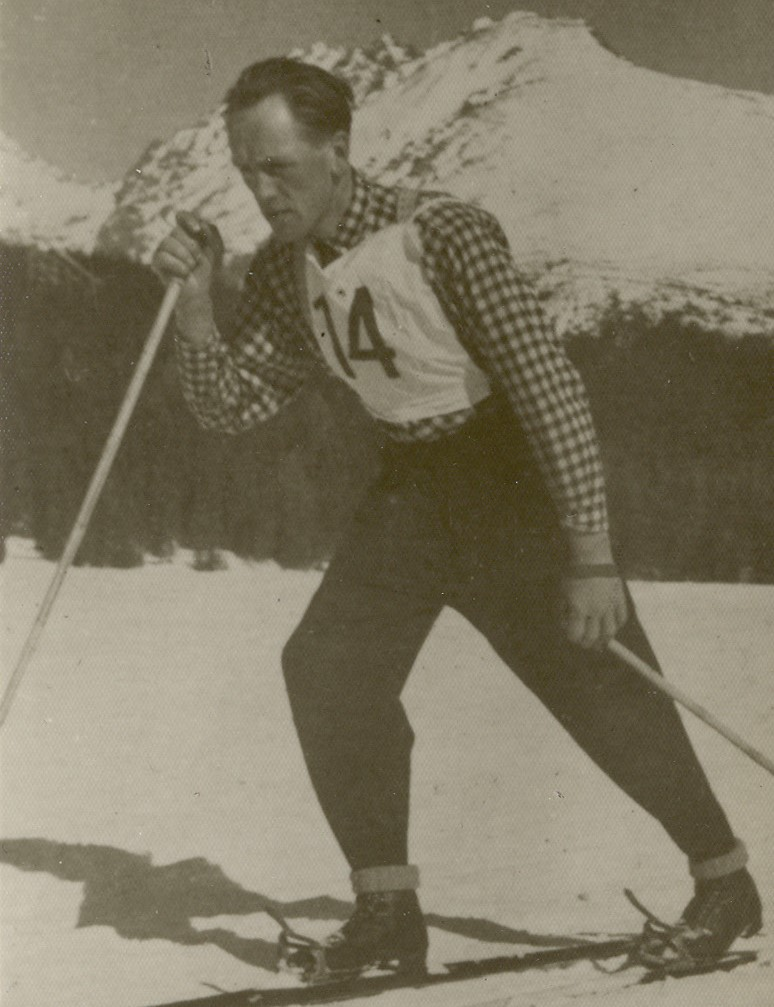
- František Fišera in 1929

Personal information
- Nationality: Czech
- Born: 22 February 1900; Víchová nad Jizerou, Austria-Hungary
- Died: 3 February 1982 (aged 81); Víchová nad Jizerou, Czechoslovakia

Sport
- Sport: Cross-country skiing

František Fišera (22 February 1900 – 3 February 1982) was a Czech cross-country skier. He competed in the men's 50 kilometre event at the 1928 Winter Olympics.
