= Louis Beraud =

French Nordic combined skier

Personal information
- Nationality: French

Sport
- Sport: Nordic combined

Louis Beraud was a French skier who competed in the Nordic combined event at the 1928 Winter Olympics.
