= Stanisław Wilczyński =

Polish cross-country skier

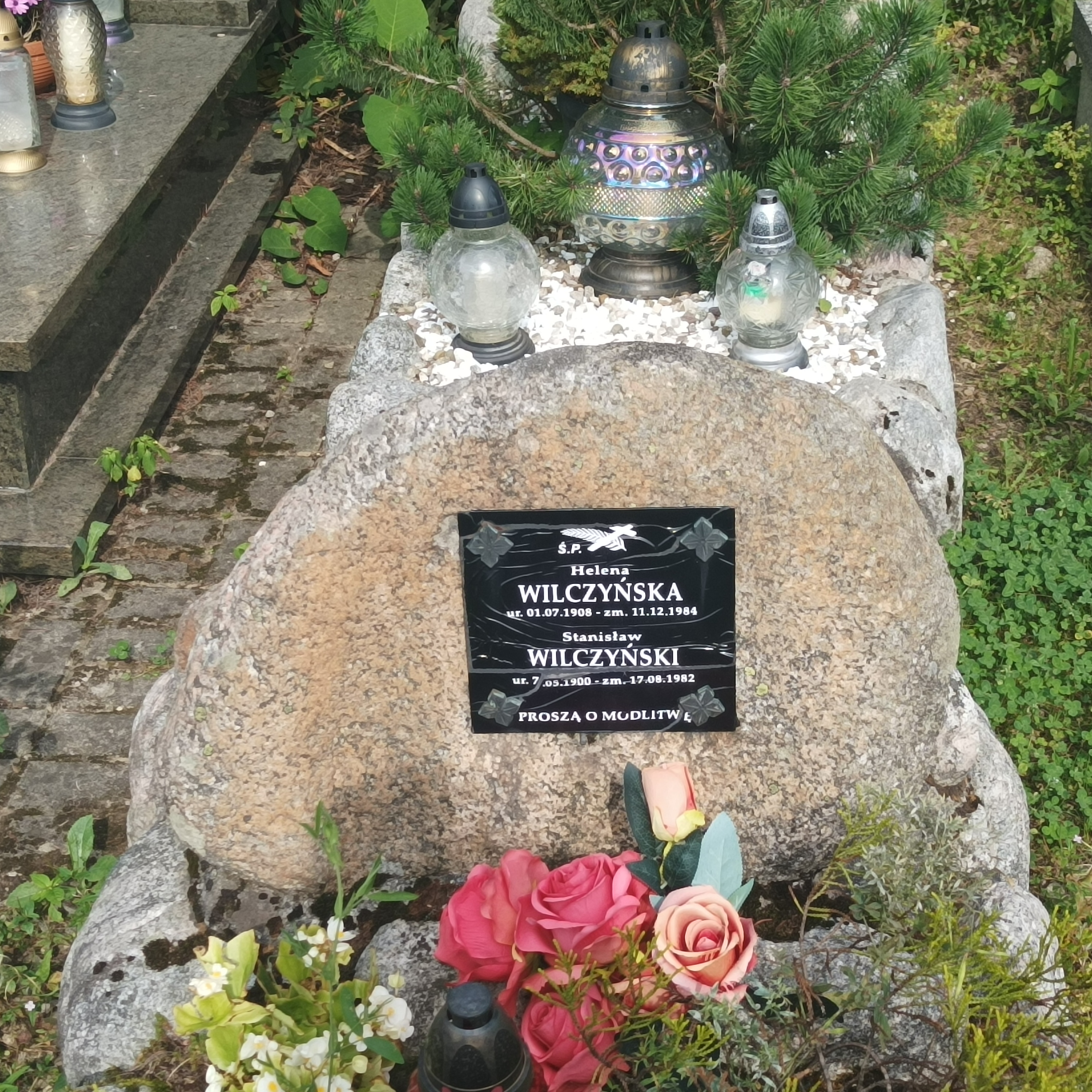
- The grave of Stanisław Wilczyński in Zakopane

Personal information
- Nationality: Polish
- Born: 7 May 1900; Muszyna, Austria-Hungary
- Died: 17 August 1982 (aged 82); Białka Tatrzańska, Poland

Sport
- Sport: Cross-country skiing

Stanisław Wilczyński (7 May 1900 – 17 August 1982) was a Polish cross-country skier. He competed in the men's 50 kilometre event at the 1928 Winter Olympics.
