= Stanisław Motyka =

Polish Nordic combined skier

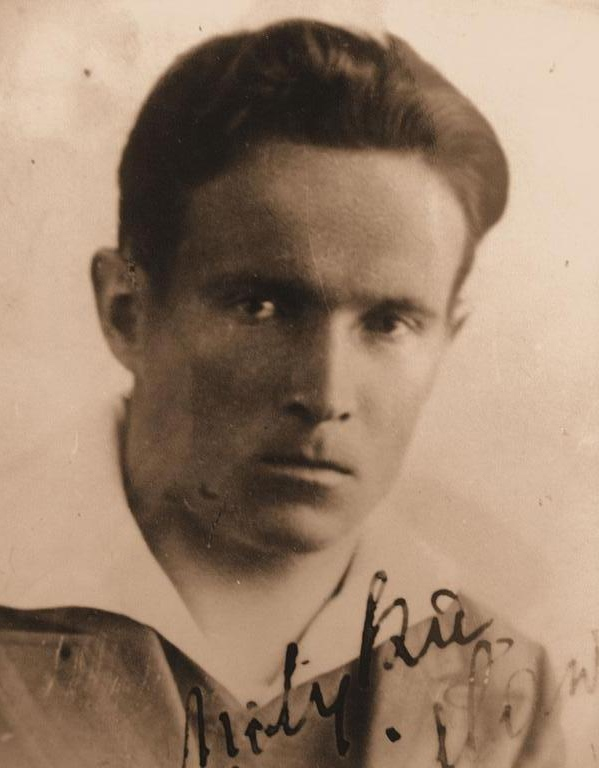

Personal information
- Nationality: Polish
- Born: 6 May 1906 Zakopane, Austria-Hungary
- Died: 7 July 1941 (aged 35) River Danube, Hungary

Sport
- Sport: Nordic combined

Stanisław Motyka (6 May 1906 – 7 July 1941) was a Polish skier. He competed in the Nordic combined event at the 1928 Winter Olympics. He was killed during World War II.
