= Robert Wampfler =

Swiss cross-country skier

Personal information
- Full name: Robert Wampfler
- Nationality: Swiss
- Born: 10 January 1896

Sport
- Sport: Cross-country skiing

Robert Wampfler (born 10 January 1896) was a cross-country skier for Switzerland. He competed in the men's 50 kilometre event at the 1928 Winter Olympics.
