= Zogg =

Zogg is a surname. Notable people with the surname include:

- David Zogg (1902–1977), Swiss alpine and Nordic combined skier
- Florian Zogg (1900–1993), Swiss cross-country skier
- Julie Zogg (born 1992), Swiss snowboarder
- Jon Zogg (born 1960), American football player
- Onyinyechi Zogg (born 1997), Swiss-born Nigerian footballer
