= Joško Janša =

Slovenian cross-country skier

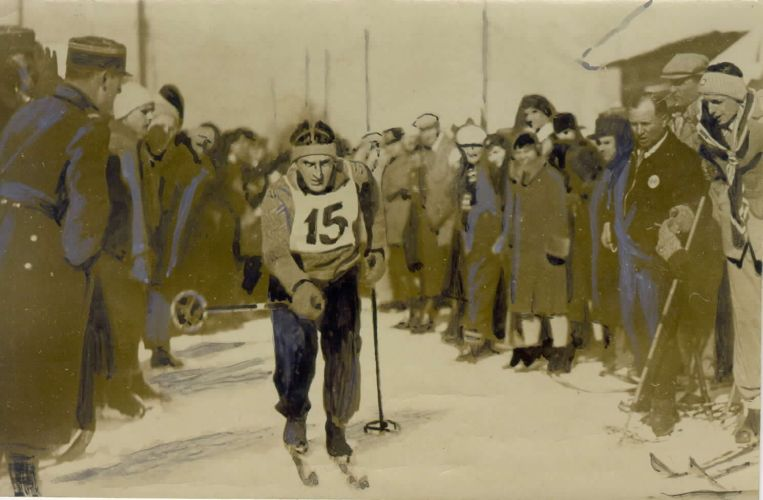
- Joško Janša in 1929

Personal information
- Nationality: Slovenian
- Born: 16 December 1900 Mojstrana, Austria-Hungary

Sport
- Sport: Cross-country skiing

Joško Janša (16 December 1900 – 1960) was a Slovenian cross-country skier.

He was born in the village of Dovje near Kranjska Gora and was a farmer by profession. He started his sports career by playing football for a club from Jesenice, but later switched to cross-country skiing and ski jumping. He competed in cross-country skiing in the 1928 Winter Olympics and reached the 26th position in the men's 18 kilometre event and the 23rd position in the men's 50 kilometre event.

He is buried in the cemetery in Dovje.

His brother Janko Janša was also an Olympic cross-country skier.
