= Wilhelm Braun =

German cross-country skier (1897–1969)

Personal information
- Nationality: German
- Born: 13 July 1897; Baiersbronn, German Empire
- Died: 15 November 1969 (aged 72); Baiersbronn, West Germany

Sport
- Sport: Cross-country skiing

Wilhelm Braun (13 July 1897 – 15 November 1969) was a German cross-country skier. He competed in the men's 18 kilometre event at the 1928 Winter Olympics.
