= Olav Kjelbotn =

Norwegian cross-country skier

Medal record

Representing Norway

Men's cross-country skiing

World Championships
Bronze medal – third place	1926 Lahti	50 km

Olav Kjelbotn (5 October 1898, Fosnes Municipality – 17 May 1966, Namsos Municipality) was a Norwegian cross-country skier who competed in the late 1920s. He won a bronze medal at the 1926 FIS Nordic World Ski Championships in the 50 km event.

Kjelbotn also finished fourth in the 50 km event at the 1928 Winter Olympics in St. Moritz.

== Cross-country skiing results ==
All results are sourced from the International Ski Federation (FIS).

=== Olympic Games ===
Year	Age	18 km	50 km
1928	29	—	4

=== World Championships ===
- 1 medal – (1 bronze)

Year	Age	30 km	50 km
1926	27	7	Bronze
