= François Vallier =

French cross-country skier (1900–1992)

Personal information
- Nationality: French
- Born: 4 November 1900; Névache, France
- Died: 24 March 1992 (aged 91); Embrun, France

Sport
- Sport: Cross-country skiing

François Vallier (4 November 1900 – 24 March 1992) was a French cross-country skier. He competed in the men's 18 kilometre event at the 1928 Winter Olympics.
