= Stane Bervar =

Slovenian cross-country skier (1905–1987)

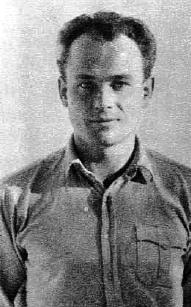

Personal information
- Full name: Stanislav Bervar-Nani
- Nationality: Slovenian
- Born: 30 December 1905; Ljubljana, Austria-Hungary
- Died: October 1987; Ljubljana, SR Slovenia, Yugoslavia

Sport
- Sport: Cross-country skiing

Stane Bervar (30 December 1905 – October 1987) was a Slovenian cross-country skier. He competed in the men's 50 kilometre event at the 1928 Winter Olympics.
