= Camille Tournier =

French cross-country skier (1900–1974)

Personal information
- Full name: Jean Camille Claret-Tournier
- Nationality: French
- Born: 25 December 1900; Chamonix-Mont-Blanc, France
- Died: 25 September 1974 (aged 73); Chamonix-Mont-Blanc, France

Sport
- Sport: Cross-country skiing

Camille Tournier (25 December 1900 – 25 September 1974) was a French cross-country skier. He competed in the men's 50 kilometre event at the 1928 Winter Olympics.
