= Petar Klofutar =

Slovenian cross-country skier (1893–1958)

Personal information
- Nationality: Slovenian
- Born: 29 July 1893; Kranjska Gora, Austria-Hungary
- Died: 21 December 1958 (aged 65); Kranjska Gora, SR Slovenia, Yugoslavia

Sport
- Sport: Cross-country skiing

Petar Klofutar (29 July 1893 – 21 December 1958) was a Slovenian cross-country skier. He competed in the men's 18 kilometre event at the 1928 Winter Olympics.
