= Józef Gąsienica Daniel =

Polish Nordic combined skier

Personal information
- Nationality: Polish
- Born: 15 June 1945; Zakopane, Poland
- Died: 6 February 2008 (aged 62); Zakopane, Poland

Sport
- Sport: Nordic combined

Józef Gąsienica Daniel (15 June 1945 – 6 February 2008) was a Polish skier. He competed in the Nordic combined event at the 1968 Winter Olympics. He was also the brother of three fellow Winter Olympians: cross-country skier Helena Gąsienica Daniel, alpine skier Maria Gąsienica Daniel-Szatkowska and ski jumper Andrzej Gąsienica Daniel. In addition, he was the great-uncle of Olympic alpine skiers Agnieszka and Maryna Gąsienica-Daniel.
