= Maria Gąsienica Daniel-Szatkowska =

Polish alpine skier (1936–2016)

Personal information
- Nationality: Polish
- Born: 5 February 1936; Zakopane, Poland
- Died: 1 January 2016 (aged 79); Zakopane, Poland

Sport
- Sport: Alpine skiing

Maria Gąsienica Daniel-Szatkowska (5 February 1936 – 1 January 2016) was a Polish alpine skier. She competed at the 1956 Winter Olympics and the 1964 Winter Olympics. She was the sister of fellow Olympians Helena Gąsienica Daniel, Andrzej Gąsienica Daniel and Józef Gąsienica Daniel, as well as fellow competitive skier Franciszek Gąsienica Daniel. She was also the great-aunt of alpine skiers Agnieszka and Maryna Gąsienica-Daniel.
