= Maryna Gąsienica-Daniel =

Polish alpine skier (born 1994)

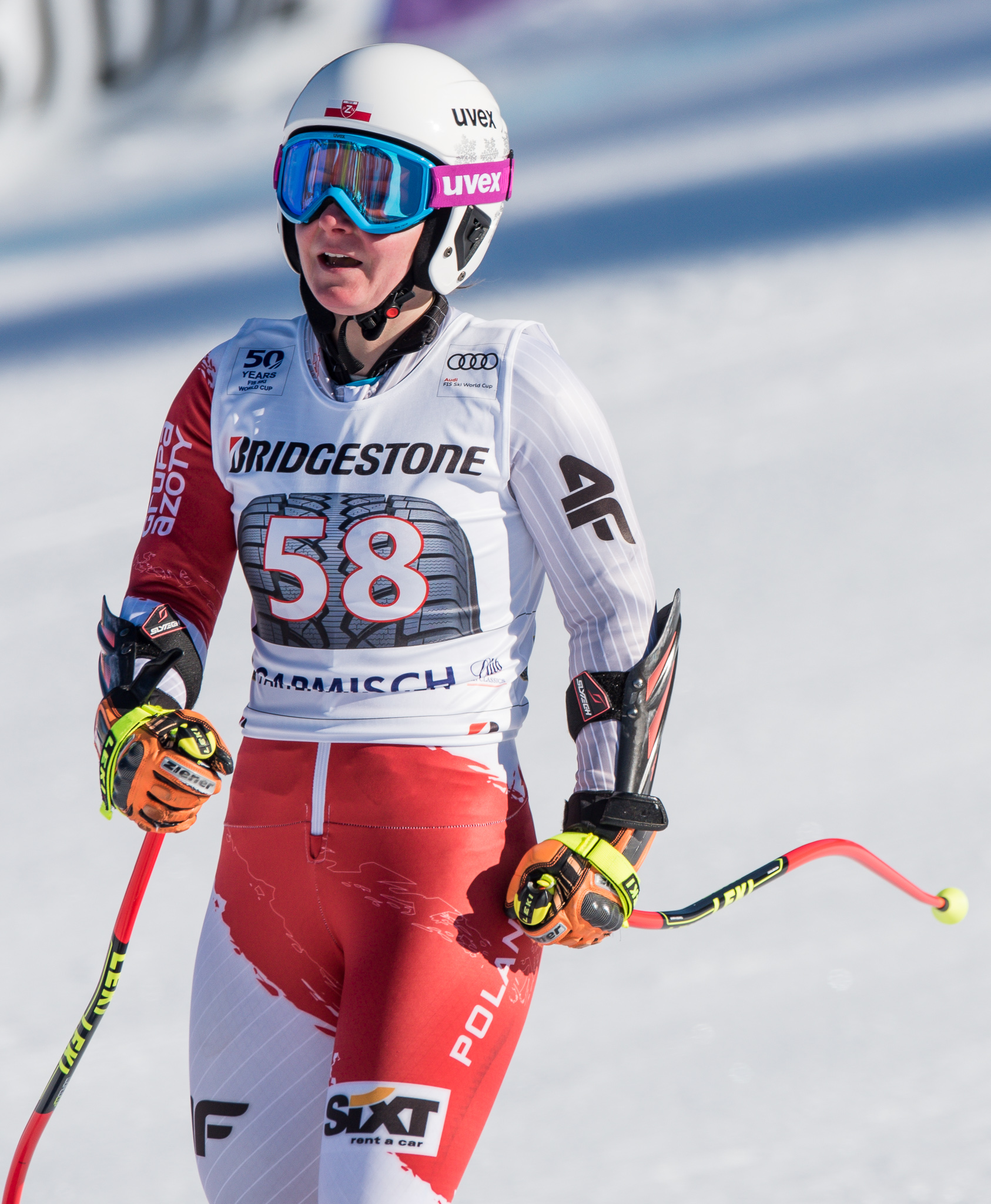
- Gąsienica-Daniel in January 2017

Personal information
- Born: 19 February 1994 (age 32) Zakopane, Poland
- Height: 1.60 m (5 ft 3 in)
- Family: Agnieszka Gąsienica-Daniel (sister)

Skiing career
- Country: Poland
- Sport: Alpine skiing
- Disciplines: Giant slalom
- World Cup debut: 28 December 2011 (age 17)

Olympics
- Teams: 4 – (2014, 2018, 2022, 2026)
- Medals: 0

World Championships
- Teams: 7 − (2013–2025)
- Medals: 0

World Cup
- Seasons: 14 − (2012–2019, 2021–2026)
- Podiums: 0
- Overall titles: 0 − (33rd in 2022)
- Discipline titles: 0 – (9th in PAR, 2021 & GS, 2022)
Medal record
Women's alpine skiing
Representing Poland
Winter Universiade
Gold medal – first place	2013 Trentino	Giant slalom

Maryna Gąsienica-Daniel (born 19 February 1994) is a World Cup alpine ski racer from Poland. She has represented her country at four Winter Olympics and seven World Championships.

== Career ==
She competed for Poland at the 2014 Winter Olympics in the alpine skiing events, and was 32nd in the giant slalom. She finished 34th in the giant slalom at the World Championships in 2013, and won a gold medal in giant slalom at the 2013 Winter Universiade. She was also fifth in the giant slalom at the 2013 World Junior Championships in Quebec. At the 2021 World Championships in Cortina d'Ampezzo, she placed joint fifth in the parallel giant slalom and sixth in the giant slalom. She injured her knee during a race at Soldeu in March 2025 and missed the rest of the season.

== Family ==
She is from a winter sports family: her grandfather Franciszek Gąsienica Daniel was a competitive skier. Although he did not compete at the Winter Olympics, Maryna is the seventh member of her family to represent Poland at the Winter Games: the others include Franciszek's siblings Helena Gąsienica Daniel (cross-country skiing), Andrzej Gąsienica Daniel (ski jumping), Maria Gąsienica Daniel-Szatkowska (alpine skiing) and Józef Gąsienica Daniel (Nordic combined), as well as one of her maternal great-grandfathers, cross-country skier Andrzej Krzeptowski, and Maryna's sister, alpine racer Agnieszka Gąsienica-Daniel.

Her parents run a hostel in the Tatra Mountains. She is god-daughter of Sebastian Karpiel-Bułecka, frontman of the folk group Zakopower.

== World Cup results ==
=== Season standings ===
Season
Season	Age	Overall	Slalom	Giant slalom	Super-G	Downhill	Combined	Parallel
2017	22	122	—	—	—	—	50	—N/a
2018	23	110	47	—	—	—	42	—N/a
2019	24	95	57	35	—	—	—	—N/a
2020	25	did not compete						
2021	26	39	—	14	51	—	—N/a	9
2022	27	33	—	9	42	—	—N/a	11
2023	28	43	—	13	50	—	—N/a	—N/a
2024	29	58	—	23	36	—	—N/a	—N/a
2025	30	53	—	18	46	—	—N/a	—N/a
2026	31	38	—	13	53	—	—N/a	—N/a
2027	32	9	—	9	—	—	—N/a	—N/a

Standings through 26 October 2026

=== Top-ten results ===
- 0 podiums; 18 top tens (17 GS, 1 PG)

Season
Season	Date	Location	Discipline	Place
2021	26 November 2020	Lech/Zürs, Austria	Parallel-G	9th
2021	16 January 2021	Kranjska Gora, Slovenia	Giant slalom	10th
2021	21 March 2021	Lenzerheide, Switzerland	Giant slalom	10th
2022	21 December 2021	Courchevel, France	Giant slalom	6th
2022	22 December 2021	Courchevel, France	Giant slalom	6th
2022	8 January 2022	Kranjska Gora, Slovenia	Giant slalom	6th
2022	25 January 2022	Kronplatz, Italy	Giant slalom	10th
2022	11 March 2022	Åre, Sweden	Giant slalom	10th
2022	20 March 2022	Méribel, France	Giant slalom	8th
2023	26 November 2022	Killington, United States	Giant slalom	8th
2023	28 December 2022	Semmering, Austria	Giant slalom	6th
2023	24 January 2023	Kronplatz, Italy	Giant slalom	7th
2023	10 March 2023	Åre, Sweden	Giant slalom	9th
2023	19 March 2023	Soldeu, Andorra	Giant slalom	8th
2026	27 December 2025	Semmering, Austria	Giant slalom	5th
2026	3 January 2026	Kranjska Gora, Slovenia	Giant slalom	7th
2026	20 January 2026	Kronplatz, Italy	Giant slalom	5th
2027	24 October 2026	Sölden, Austria	Giant slalom	9th

== World Championship results ==
Year
Year	Age	Slalom	Giant slalom	Super-G	Downhill	Combined	Team combined	Parallel	Team event
2013	18	DNF1	34	DNS1	—	—	—N/a	—N/a	—
2015	20	35	38	34	—	—	—N/a	—N/a	—
2017	22	DNF2	32	32	—	23	—N/a	—N/a	—
2019	24	—	32	DNF	—	21	—N/a	—N/a	—
2021	26	—	6	27	—	12	—N/a	8	—
2023	28	—	10	DNF	—	11	—N/a	5	9
2025	30	—	15	DNF	—	—N/a	—	—N/a	10

== Olympic results ==
Year
Year	Age	Slalom	Giant slalom	Super-G	Downhill	Combined	Team combined	Team event
2014	19	DNF1	32	DNF	—	—	—N/a	—N/a
2018	23	—	27	26	24	16	—N/a	—
2022	27	—	8	26	—	—	—N/a	10
2026	31	—	7	18	—	—N/a	—	—N/a

== Europa Cup results ==
=== Race victories ===
Season
Season	Date	Location	Discipline
2019	13 December 2018	Andalo Paganella, Italy	Giant slalom
2019	14 December 2018	Andalo Paganella, Italy	Giant slalom
2021	16 December 2020	Hippach, Austria	Giant slalom
2021	17 December 2020	Hippach, Austria	Giant slalom
