= Henri Millan =

French cross-country skier (1903–1982)

Personal information
- Nationality: French
- Born: 10 December 1903
- Died: 8 October 1982 (aged 78)

Sport
- Sport: Cross-country skiing

Henri Millan (10 December 1903 – 8 October 1982) was a French cross-country skier. He competed in the men's 50 kilometre event at the 1928 Winter Olympics.
