= Helena Gąsienica Daniel =

Polish cross-country skier

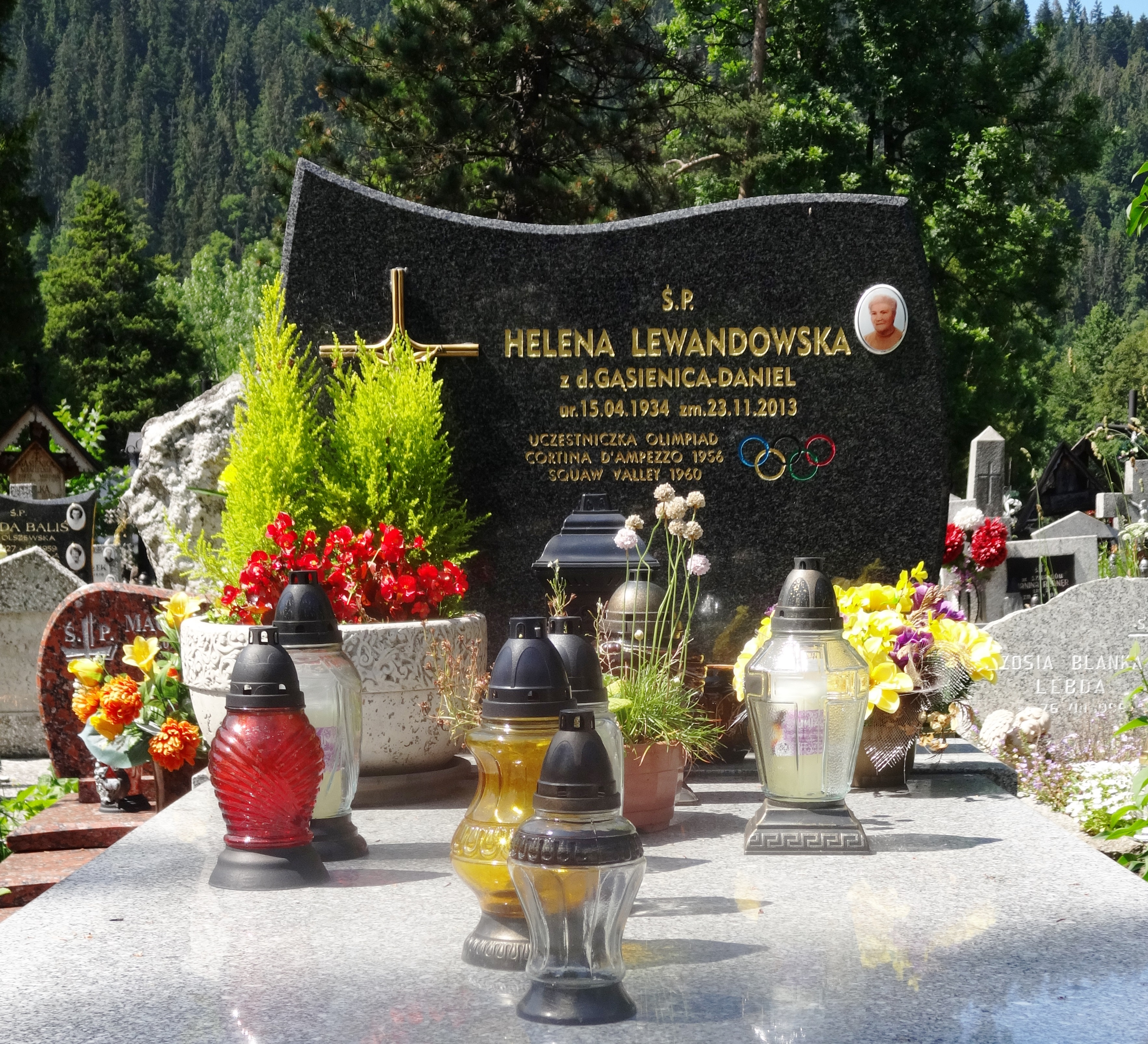
- Her grave

Personal information
- Born: 15 April 1934 Zakopane, Poland
- Died: 23 November 2013 (aged 79) Zakopane, Poland
- Height: 1.60 m (5 ft 3 in)

Sport
- Country: Polish
- Sport: Skiing

Helena Gąsienica Daniel (15 April 1934 – 23 November 2013) was a Polish cross-country skier. She enjoyed success from a young age, winning two gold medals at the Polish national championships by the age of 16: she went on to win a total of ten golds and four silver medals at the national championships. She competed at the 1956 Winter Olympics and the 1960 Winter Olympics. At the 1956 Games she finished in 24th place in the 10 km, whilst at the 1960 Games she finished 21st in the 10 km and, alongside Stefania Biegun and Józefa Czerniawska-Pęksa, was part of the Polish team that finished fourth in the 3 x 5 km relay.

She was awarded the Silver Cross of Merit. She was the sister of fellow Olympians Maria Gąsienica Daniel-Szatkowska, Andrzej Gąsienica Daniel and Józef Gąsienica Daniel, as well as fellow competitive skier Franciszek Gąsienica Daniel. She was also the great-aunt of alpine skiers Agnieszka and Maryna Gąsienica-Daniel.

== Cross-country skiing results ==
=== Olympic Games ===
Year	Age	10 km	3 × 5 km relay
1956	21	24	—
1960	25	21	4
