= Andrzej Gąsienica Daniel =

Polish ski jumper

Personal information
- Nationality: Polish
- Born: 13 March 1932; Zakopane, Poland
- Died: 31 August 1991 (aged 59); Zakopane, Poland

Sport
- Sport: Ski jumping

Andrzej Gąsienica Daniel (13 March 1932 – 31 August 1991) was a Polish ski jumper. He competed in the individual event at the 1956 Winter Olympics and at one time held the Polish national ski flying record. He was also the brother of three fellow Winter Olympians: cross-country skier Helena Gąsienica Daniel, alpine skier Maria Gąsienica Daniel-Szatkowska and Nordic combined skier Józef Gąsienica Daniel. In addition, he was the great-uncle of Olympic alpine skiers Agnieszka and Maryna Gąsienica-Daniel.
