= Florian Zogg =

Swiss cross-country skier (1900–1993)

Personal information
- Nationality: Swiss
- Born: 26 September 1900; Azmoos, Switzerland
- Died: 5 January 1993 (aged 92)

Sport
- Sport: Cross-country skiing

Florian Zogg (26 September 1900 – 5 January 1993) was a Swiss cross-country skier. He competed in the men's 18 kilometre event at the 1928 Winter Olympics.
