= Kmet =

Kmet or Kmeť is a surname. It literally means "peasant", "serf", or "farmer" in several Slavic languages and "village mayor" in Bulgarian and Macedonian. Notable people with the surname include:

- Andrej Kmeť (1841–1908), Slovak botanist, ethnographer, archaeologist, and geologist
- Cole Kmet (born 1999), American football player
- Frank Kmet (born 1970), American football player
- Julián Kmet (born 1977), Argentine footballer
- Matúš Kmeť (born 2000), Slovak footballer
- Stane Kmet (1893–1968), Slovenian cross-country skier
