= Einar Fr. Lindboe =

Norwegian skier (1876–1953)

Einar Fredrik Lindboe (2 June 1876 – 26 June 1953) was a Norwegian Nordic skier, skiing official and surgeon.

He was born in Vestre Aker as a son of chief physician Axel Hagbarth Lindboe (1846–1911) and Jørgine Margarethe Hagerup Angell (1853–96), and a nephew of Jacob Lindboe. He grew up at Gaustad, where his father was the chief of Gaustad Asylum. In October 1904 in Kristiania he married Hildur Dorothea Schibsted (1879–1944), a daughter of Thrine and Amandus Schibsted. He was the maternal grandfather of Tinius Nagell-Erichsen.

As an active Nordic combined skier, Lindboe's highest achievement was fifth place in the Holmenkollen ski festival of 1900. He was a member of SK Skuld, later Medicinernes SK Svartor. He became a board member of the Association for the Promotion of Skiing. He served as its chairman from 1917 to 1921, then as chairman of the Norwegian Ski Federation from 1922 to 1927. He was also a board member of the Norges Landsforbund for Idrett and the Norwegian Olympic Committee, albeit as a skeptic towards the introduction of Winter Olympics. Lindboe chaired the building committee of the Ski Museum, and was in charge of selecting the 50-kilometre cross-country skiing course for the Holmenkollen ski festival for many years. He shared the Holmenkollen medal with Hagbart Haakonsen in 1927, and was also given the King's Medal of Merit in gold.

Lindboe finished secondary school at Gjertsen School in 1895 and graduated from the Royal Frederick University with a cand.med. degree in 1903. He served in Kristiania for one year and in Toten for two years before opening a doctor's office in Kristiania in 1906. Until 1911 he was also a secretary for the Norwegian Red Cross and teacher at the Red Cross nurse's college, and until 1916 he was also a reserve physician at Diakonhjemmet Hospital. In 1909 he became a qualified surgeon. From 1917 to 1928 Lindboe ran a private clinic in Josefines gate 30. He sold it to Oslo Municipality in 1929 and worked the next ten years as chief physician and surgeon at Diakonhjemmet Hospital. In 1935 he became the probably first surgeon of a Nordic country to document a surgery by filming.

He chaired the Oslo Surgical Association and was a board member of the Norwegian Medical Society and the Nordic Surgical Society and was a member of the Oslo city council from 1926 to 1928. In March 1940 he served on a Red Cross ambulance during the Winter War. One month later, during the Norwegian Campaign, he led a Norwegian ambulance in Northern Gudbrandsdalen. He died in June 1953 in Oslo.

Sporting positions
Preceded by Rolf Prydz	Chairman of the Association for the Promotion of Skiing; 1917–1921	Succeeded by S. Chr. Sommerfelt
