= Henry Johansson =

Swedish ice hockey player (1897–1979)

- Born: September 23, 1897 Södertälje, SWE
- Died: May 28, 1979 (aged 81)
- Position: Defence
- Played for: Södertälje SK
- National team: Sweden
- Playing career: 1924–1932

Olympic medal record

Men's Ice hockey
Silver medal – second place	1928 St. Moritz	Team competition

Henry Johan Johansson (September 23, 1897 – May 28, 1979) was a Swedish ice hockey player who competed in the 1928 Winter Olympics. He was a member of the Swedish ice hockey team, which won the silver medal.
