= Andrzej Krzeptowski (born 1902) =

Polish cross-country skier

Personal information
- Nationality: Polish
- Born: 3 August 1902; Kościelisko
- Died: 12 April 1981 (aged 78); Zakopane
- Height: 170 cm (5 ft 7 in)
- Weight: 68 kg (150 lb)

Sport
- Sport: Skiing
- Event: Cross-country

Andrzej Krzeptowski (3 August 1902 – 12 April 1981) was a Polish cross-country skier who competed for Poland at the 1928 Winter Olympics, finishing 13th in the 50 kilometre event and 25th in the 18 kilometre competition.

He had a cousin with the same name, Andrzej Krzeptowski (1903–1945), who competed at the 1924 Winter Olympics (Nordic combined, ski jumping, cross-country) and the 1928 Winter Olympics (ski jumping). He was also the maternal great-grandfather of Olympic alpine skiers Agnieszka and Maryna Gąsienica-Daniel.
