= Takeharu Aso =

Japanese cross-country skier (1899–1993)

Personal information
- Nationality: Japanese
- Born: 21 November 1899 Tokyo, Japan
- Died: 30 May 1993 (aged 93)

Sport
- Sport: Cross-country skiing

Takeharu Aso (21 November 1899 – 30 May 1993) was a Japanese cross-country skier. He competed in the men's 50 kilometre event at the 1928 Winter Olympics. He was also a middle-distance runner and shared in the 1500 metres national title with Eiichi Nagayama at the 1919 Japan Championships in Athletics.
