= Boris Režek =

Slovenian cross-country skier

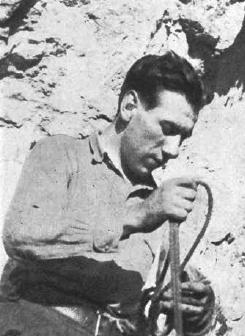

Personal information
- Nationality: Slovenian
- Born: 2 October 1908; Ljubljana, Austria-Hungary
- Died: 26 July 1986 (aged 77); Ljubljana, Yugoslavia

Sport
- Sport: Cross-country skiing

Boris Režek (2 October 1908 – 26 July 1986) was a Slovenian cross-country skier. He competed in the men's 18 kilometre event at the 1928 Winter Olympics.
