= Medicinernes SK Svartor =

Norwegian skiing club

Medicinernes Skiklub Svartor is one of Norway's oldest active skiing clubs, established by Bernhard Matheson, Brynjulf Stendahl, Carl Manthey and Ragnar Mørk in 1890 to "advance skiing and comradeship" among medical students in Oslo. The club annually hosts the world's oldest ski jumping contest still in existence (since 1891), and has fostered numerous famous athletes such as Einar Fredrik Lindboe, Johan Matheson, Peter S. Nicolaysen, Cato Aall and Ingemann Sverre.

The club has also given name to the Svartor mutation, which causes hereditary high cholesterol.
