= Agnieszka Gąsienica-Daniel =

Polish alpine skier (born 1987)

Personal information
- Full name: Agnieszka Anna Gąsienica-Daniel
- Nationality: Polish
- Born: 22 December 1987 (age 38) Zakopane, Poland
- Height: 159 cm (63 in)
- Weight: 58 kg (128 lb)

Sport
- Country: Poland
- Sport: Skiing
- Event: Alpine Skiing

Achievements and titles
- Olympic finals: 2010 Winter Olympics: Women's Downhill– 32; Women's Super Combined– 29; Women's Super-G– 23; Women's Slalom– 46 & 35; Women's Giant Slalom– DNF

Agnieszka Anna Gąsienica-Daniel (born 22 December 1987) is a female skier from Poland. She took part in the Alpine skiing events at the 2010 Winter Olympics, and at the FIS Alpine World Ski Championships in 2007.

She is from a winter sports family: her grandfather Franciszek Gąsienica Daniel was a competitive skier. Although she did not compete at the Winter Olympics, Agnieszka is one of seven members of her family to represent Poland at the Winter Games: the others include Franciszek's siblings Helena Gąsienica Daniel (cross-country skiing), Andrzej Gąsienica Daniel (ski jumping), Maria Gąsienica Daniel-Szatkowska (alpine skiing) and Józef Gąsienica Daniel (Nordic combined), as well as one of her maternal great-grandfathers, cross-country skier Andrzej Krzeptowski, and Agnieszka's sister, fellow alpine skier Maryna Gąsienica-Daniel.

Results

FIS Alpine World Ski Championships 2007:
Women's Slalom–DNF
Ladies Giant Slalom–DNF
2010 Winter Olympics:
Women's Downhill– 32
Women's Super Combined– 29
Women's Super-G– 23
Women's Slalom– 46 & 35
Women's Giant Slalom– DNF
