= Ferdinando Glück =

Italian cross-country skier

Personal information
- Nationality: Italian
- Born: 20 July 1901; Selva di Val Gardena, Italy
- Died: 2 December 1987 (aged 86)

Sport
- Sport: Cross-country skiing

Ferdinando Glück (20 July 1901 – 2 December 1987) was an Italian cross-country skier. He competed in the men's 50 kilometre event at the 1928 Winter Olympics.
