= Bertil Linde =

Swedish ice hockey player

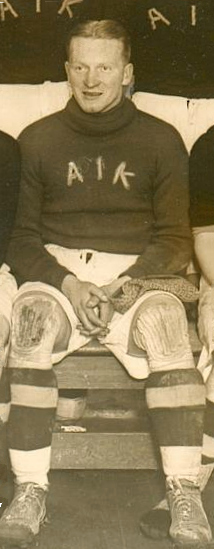
- Linde c. 1930

Personal information
- Born: 28 February 1907 Stockholm, Sweden
- Died: 25 March 1990 (aged 83) Stockholm, Sweden
- Height: 177 cm (5 ft 10 in)
- Weight: 80 kg (176 lb)

Sport
- Sport: Ice hockey
- Club: Karlbergs BK (1926–29, 1932–37); AIK (1929–32)
Medal record
Representing Sweden
Olympic Games
Silver medal – second place	1928 St. Moritz	Team

Bertil Knut Hilding Linde (28 February 1907 – 25 March 1990) was a Swedish ice hockey player who won a silver medal at the 1928 Winter Olympics.

Linde competed in ice hockey, bandy and football, but never won a national title. After retiring from competitions he worked as a machinist at Arenco AB, a leading manufacturer of packaging and fish processing machinery.
