= Kurt Sucksdorff =

Swedish ice hockey player

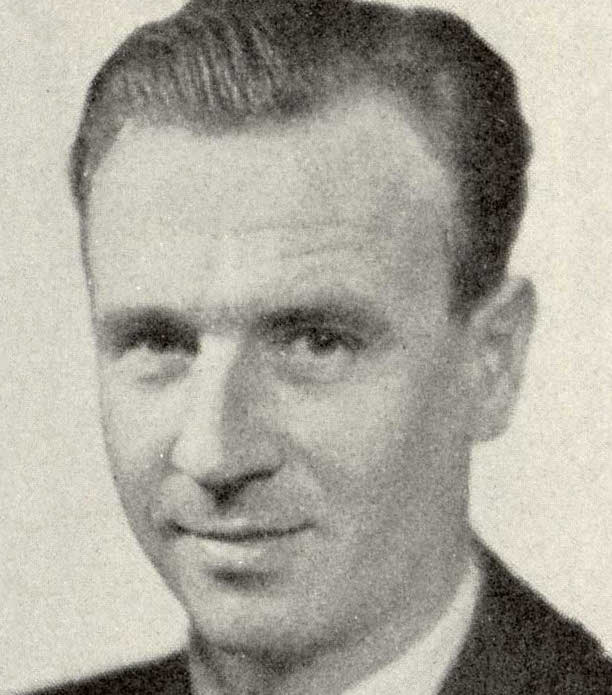

Personal information
- Born: 10 May 1904 Stockholm, Sweden
- Died: 1 January 1960 (aged 55) Stockholm, Sweden

Sport
- Sport: Ice hockey
- Club: IFK Stockholm (1922–27); IK Göta, Bromma (1927–34)
- Retired: 1934
Medal record
Representing Sweden
Olympic Games
Silver medal – second place	1928 St. Moritz	Team

Kurt Sucksdorff (10 May 1904 – 1 January 1960) was a Swedish ice hockey goaltender who won a silver medal at the 1928 Winter Olympics. He was a backup for Nils Johansson and therefore played only two matches. At the 1931 World Championships he played all six matches and achieved a scoreless draw against Canada, yet his team placed sixth.

Sucksdorff won Swedish titles with IK Göta in 1928-30.
