= Giovanni Testa =

Italian cross-country skier

Personal information
- Nationality: Italian
- Born: 31 July 1903 Bergün/Bravuogn, Switzerland
- Died: 18 October 1996 (aged 93) St. Moritz, Switzerland

Sport
- Sport: Cross-country skiing

Giovanni Testa (31 July 1903 – 18 October 1996) was an Italian cross-country skier. He competed in the men's 18 kilometre event at the 1928 Winter Olympics.
