= Alessandro del Torso =

Italian skeleton racer

Alessandro del Torso (10 September 1883 – 7 November 1967) was an Italian skeleton racer who competed in the late 1920s. He finished seventh in the men's skeleton event at the 1928 Winter Olympics in St. Moritz.
