= Reidar Ødegaard =

Norwegian cross-country skier

Medal record

Men's cross-country skiing

Representing Norway

Olympic Games
Bronze medal – third place	1928 St. Moritz	18 km

Reidar Ødegaard (24 November 1901 – 11 April 1972) was a Norwegian cross-country skier who competed in the 1920s. He won a bronze in the 18 km event at the 1928 Winter Olympics in St. Moritz.

He participated in the demonstration event, military patrol (precursor to biathlon), in the 1928 Winter Olympics.

== Cross-country skiing results ==
All results are sourced from the International Ski Federation (FIS).

=== Olympic Games ===
- 1 medal – (1 bronze)

Year	Age	18 km	50 km
1928	26	Bronze	—

=== World Championships ===
Year	Age	17 km	50 km
1930	28	21	13
