= Emil Bergman =

Swedish ice hockey player

- Born: July 28, 1908 Hille, SWE
- Died: April 13, 1975 (aged 66)
- Position: Right wing
- Played for: Nacka HK
- National team: Sweden
- Playing career: 1926–1934
Medal record
Men's ice hockey
Representing Sweden
Olympic Games
Silver medal – second place	1928 St. Moritz	Team competition

Emil "Nacka" Bergman (July 28, 1908 – April 13, 1975) was a Swedish ice hockey player who competed in the 1928 Winter Olympics.

He was a member of the Swedish ice hockey team, which won the silver medal.
