= Évariste Prat =

French cross-country skier (1904–1970)

Personal information
- Nationality: French
- Born: 7 January 1904; Val-des-Prés, France
- Died: 10 October 1970 (aged 66)

Sport
- Sport: Cross-country skiing

Évariste Prat (7 January 1904 – 10 October 1970) was a French cross-country skier. He competed in the men's 50 kilometre event at the 1928 Winter Olympics in Switzerland.
