= Cross-country skiing at the 1928 Winter Olympics – Men's 18 kilometre =

18 kilometres at the II Olympic Winter Games
- Date: February 17, 1928
- Competitors: 49 from 15 nations
- Winning time: 1:37:01

Medalists
1st place, gold medalist(s)		Johan Grøttumsbråten	Norway
2nd place, silver medalist(s)		Ole Hegge	Norway
3rd place, bronze medalist(s)		Reidar Ødegaard	Norway

The 18-kilometre cross-country skiing event was part of the cross-country skiing at the 1928 Winter Olympics programme. It was the second appearance of the event. The competition was held on Friday, 17 February 1928. Forty-nine cross-country skiers from 15 nations competed.

== Medalists ==
Gold	Silver	Bronze
Johan Grøttumsbråten; Norway	Ole Hegge; Norway	Reidar Ødegaard; Norway

== Results ==
Place	Competitor	Time
1	Johan Grøttumsbråten (NOR)	1'37:01
2	Ole Hegge (NOR)	1'39:01
3	Reidar Ødegaard (NOR)	1'40:11
4	Veli Saarinen (FIN)	1'40:57
5	Hagbart Haakonsen (NOR)	1'41:29
6	Per-Erik Hedlund (SWE)	1'41:51
7	Lars Theodor Jonsson (SWE)	1'41:59
7	Martti Lappalainen (FIN)	1'41:59
9	Sven Utterström (SWE)	1'42:04
10	Ville Mattila (FIN)	1'44:37
11	Franz Donth (TCH)	1'47:14
12	Vladimír Novák (TCH)	1'47:53
13	Einar Mässeli (FIN)	1'47:55
14	Ludwig Böck (GER)	1'48:56
15	Walter Bussmann (SUI)	1'49:46
16	Otakar Německý (TCH)	1'51:20
17	Harald Paumgarten (AUT)	1'51:20
18	Józef Bujak (POL)	1'54:38
19	Otto Wahl (GER)	1'55:00
20	Hans Bauer (GER)	1'57:03
21	Otto Furrer (SUI)	1'57:03
22	Matthäus Demetz (ITA)	1'57:08
23	Zdzisław Motyka (POL)	1'58:10
24	Florian Zogg (SUI)	1'58:52
25	Andrzej Krzeptowski (POL)	1'59:02
26	Joško Janša (YUG)	2'01:14
27	Takeo Yazawa-Hoshina (JPN)	2'02:29
28	François Vallier (FRA)	2'03:27
29	Wilhelm Braun (GER)	2'03:52
30	Paul Simond (FRA)	2'03:54
31	Sakuta Takebushi (JPN)	2'04:20
32	Minoru Nagata (JPN)	2'04:23
33	Maurice Mandrillon (FRA)	2'04:39
34	Giovanni Testa (ITA)	2'08:49
35	Vitale Venzi (ITA)	2'09:28
36	Martial Payot (FRA)	2'09:42
37	Subaru Takahashi (JPN)	2'10:57
38	William Thompson (CAN)	2'12:24
39	Petar Klofutar (YUG)	2'14:08
40	Janko Janša (YUG)	2'19:54
41	Merritt Putman (CAN)	2'22:40
42	Boris Režek (YUG)	2'28:44
43	Anders Haugen (USA)	2'30:30
44	Charles Proctor (USA)	2'35:00
45	Rolf Monsen (USA)	2'48:00
–	Volger Andersson (SWE)	DNF
–	Gyula Szepes (HUN)	DNF
–	Ferenc Németh (HUN)	DNF
–	Alphonse Julén (SUI)	DNF
