= Vitale Venzi =

Italian cross-country skier

Personal information
- Full name: Vitale Emilio Venzi
- Nationality: Italian
- Born: 14 December 1903; Ponte in Valtellina, Kingdom of Italy
- Died: 16 July 1944 (aged 40); Treviglio, Italy

Sport
- Sport: Cross-country skiing

Vitale Venzi (14 December 1903 – 16 July 1944) was an Italian cross-country skier. He competed in the men's 18 kilometre event at the 1928 Winter Olympics.
