= Nils Johansson (ice hockey, born 1904) =

Swedish sportsperson (1904–1936)

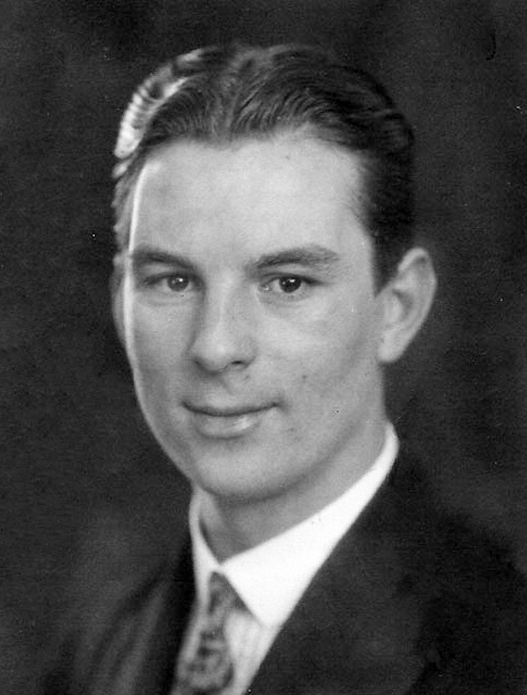
- Born: 3 October 1904 Stockholm, Sweden
- Died: 8 December 1936 (aged 32) Stockholm, Sweden
- Played for: Djurgården
Medal record
Representing Sweden
Olympic Games
Silver medal – second place	1928 St. Moritz	Team

Nils Åke Torsten "Björnungen" Johansson (3 October 1904 – 8 December 1936) was a Swedish ice hockey goaltender, bandy goalkeeper, and football goalkeeper.

As an ice hockey player, he who won a silver medal at the 1928 Winter Olympics. Domestically he played with Djurgårdens IF Hockey from 1921 to 1930. He won a Swedish title with Djurgårdens IF in 1926.

As a bandy player, he played with Djurgårdens IF Bandy and played the 1930 Swedish championship final against SK Tirfing, which his team lost 0–1. As a footballer, he played matches with Djurgårdens IF Fotboll.

His sister Märta was an Olympic diver.
