= Minoru Nagata =

Japanese cross-country skier

Personal information
- Nationality: Japanese
- Born: 1906 Niigata, Japan

Sport
- Sport: Cross-country skiing

Minoru Nagata (born 1906, date of death unknown) was a Japanese cross-country skier. He competed in the men's 18 kilometre event at the 1928 Winter Olympics.
