= Walter Buchberger =

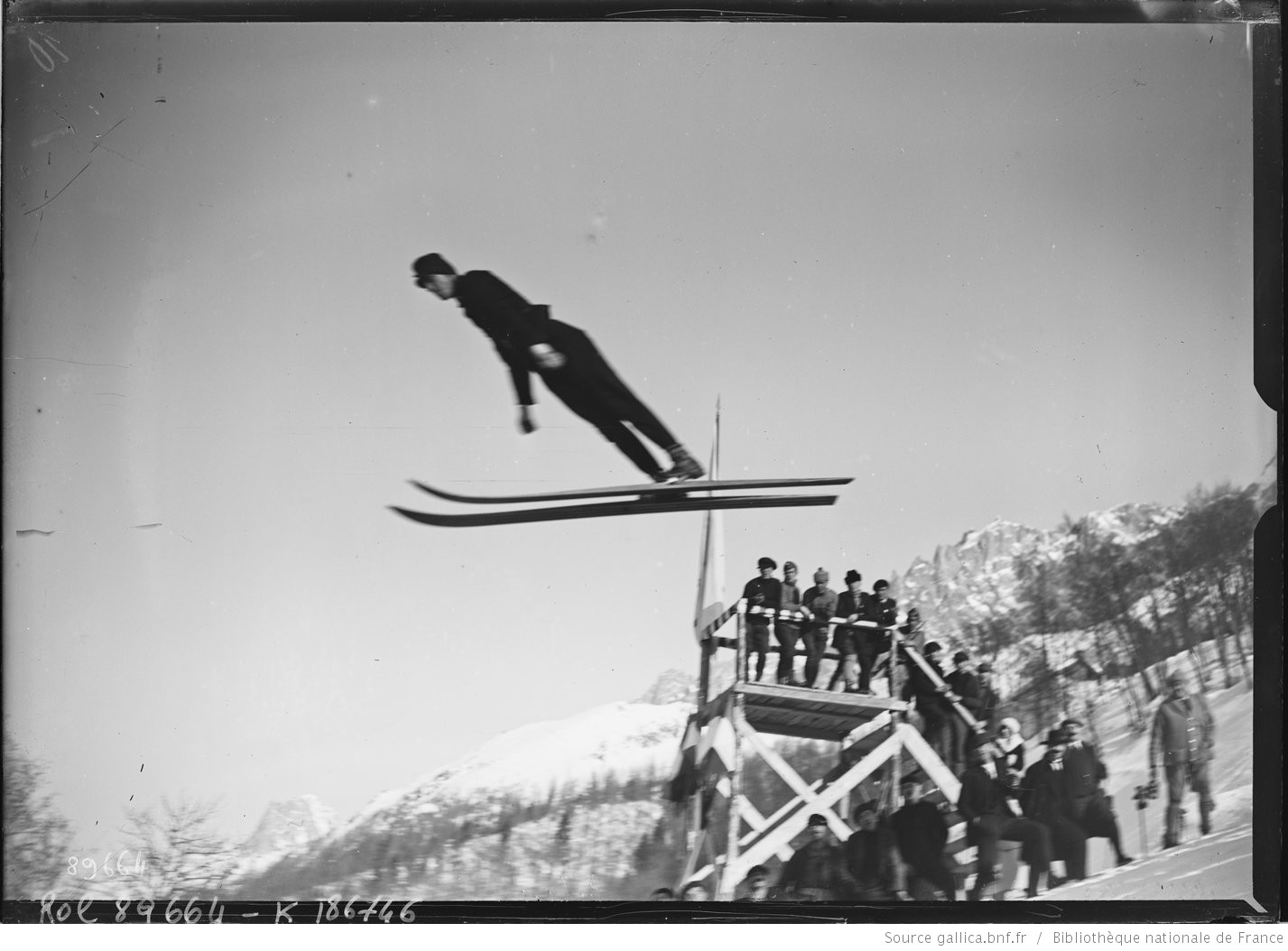
Buchberger at the 1924 Winter Olympics in Chamonix.

Walter Buchberger (24 March 1895 in Bohemia, Austria-Hungary – 1 September 1970 in Marktoberdorf, Germany) was a Czechoslovak skier of German ethnicity. He competed in Nordic combined at the 1924 Winter Olympics in Chamonix, where he placed seventh. He also competed at the 1928 Winter Olympics.
