= Jon Snersrud =

Norwegian Nordic combined skier

Medal record

Men's Nordic combined

Representing Norway

Olympic Games
Bronze medal – third place	1928 St. Moritz	Nordic combined

John Andersen Snersrud (October 1, 1902 - August 10, 1986) was a Norwegian skier who competed in Nordic combined in the 1920s. He won a Nordic combined bronze medal at the 1928 Winter Olympics in St. Moritz.
