= Takeo Yazawa-Hoshina =

Japanese cross-country skier (1906–1983)

Personal information
- Nationality: Japanese
- Born: 12 October 1906; Niigata, Japan
- Died: 7 October 1983 (aged 76)

Sport
- Sport: Cross-country skiing

Takeo Yazawa-Hoshina (12 October 1906 – 7 October 1983) was a Japanese cross-country skier. He competed at the 1928 Winter Olympics and the 1932 Winter Olympics.
