= Volger Andersson =

Swedish cross-country skier

Medal record

Men's cross-country skiing

Representing Sweden

Olympic Games
Bronze medal – third place	1928 St. Moritz	50 km

Volger Andersson (January 19, 1896, Njurunda – October 6, 1969) was a former Swedish cross-country skier who competed in the 1920s.

He won a bronze in the 50 km event at the 1928 Winter Olympics in St. Moritz. He also competed in the 18 km event but did not finish.

== Cross-country skiing results ==
All results are sourced from the International Ski Federation (FIS).

=== Olympic Games ===
- 1 medal – (1 bronze)

Year	Age	18 km	50 km
1928	32	DNF	Bronze
