= Matthäus Demetz =

Italian cross-country skier

Personal information
- Nationality: Italian
- Born: 7 May 1902
- Died: 27 June 1941 (aged 39)

Sport
- Sport: Cross-country skiing

Matthäus Demetz (7 May 1902 – 27 June 1941) was an Italian cross-country skier. He competed in the men's 18 kilometre event at the 1928 Winter Olympics.
