= Gustaf Jonsson =

Swedish cross-country skier

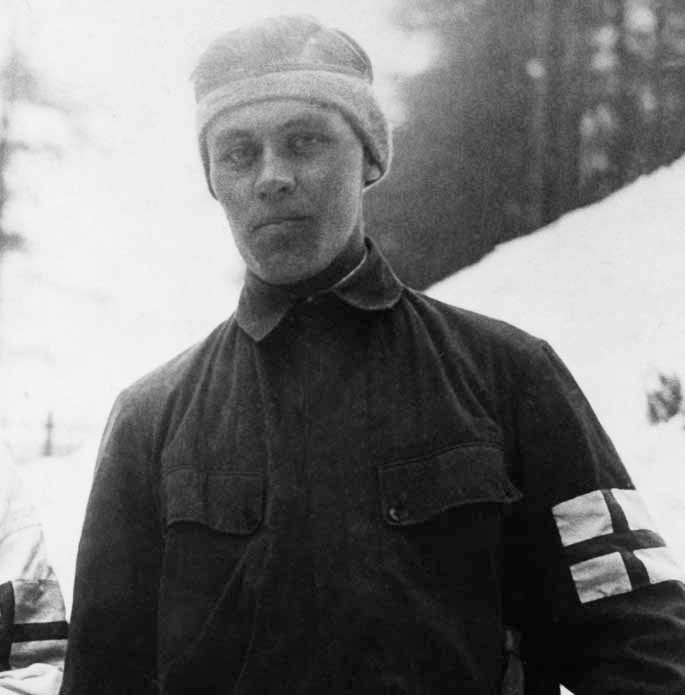
- Jonsson at the 1928 Olympics

Personal information
- Born: 7 July 1903 Lycksele, Sweden
- Died: 30 July 1990 (aged 87) Bromma, Stockholm, Sweden
- Height: 165 cm (5 ft 5 in)

Sport
- Sport: Cross-country skiing
- Club: Lycksele IF (−1927); Husum IF (1927–)
Medal record
Men's cross-country skiing
Representing Sweden
Olympic Games
Silver medal – second place	1928 St. Moritz	50 km

Karl Gustaf Jonsson (7 July 1903 – 30 July 1990) was a Swedish cross-country skier. He competed in the 50 km event at the 1928 and 1932 Olympics and won a silver medal in 1928, finishing ninth four years later.

At the Nordic World Ski Championships he placed fourth-fifth in the 30 km and 50 km events in 1926 and 1929. In 1930 he finished second in the Vasa run, and in 1925 won the national 30 km title.

During his career Jonsson was considered a waxing expert, and later became a ski wax producer. He was featured in the 1988 documentary film De sista skidåkarna (The Last Skiers).

== Cross-country skiing results ==
All results are sourced from the International Ski Federation (FIS).

=== Olympic Games ===
- 1 medal – (1 silver)

Year	Age	18 km	50 km
1928	24	—	Silver
1932	28	—	9

=== World Championships ===
Year	Age	17 km	18 km	30 km	50 km	4 × 10 km relay
1926	22	—N/a	—N/a	4	5	—N/a
1929	25	5	—N/a	—N/a	5	—N/a
1938	34	—N/a	11	—N/a	—	—
