= Stane Kmet =

Slovenian cross-country skier

Personal information
- Nationality: Slovenian
- Born: 10 November 1893; Ljubljana, Austria-Hungary
- Died: 20 December 1968 (aged 75)

Sport
- Sport: Cross-country skiing

Stane Kmet (10 November 1893 – 20 December 1968) was a Slovenian cross-country skier. He competed in the men's 50 kilometre event at the 1928 Winter Olympics.
