= Subaru Takahashi =

Japanese cross-country skier (1902–1992)

Personal information
- Nationality: Japanese
- Born: 31 August 1902; Hokkaido, Japan
- Died: 4 July 1992 (aged 89)

Sport
- Sport: Cross-country skiing

Subaru Takahashi (高橋 昴, Takahashi Subaru, 31 August 1902 – 4 July 1992) was a Japanese cross-country skier. He competed in the men's 18 kilometre event at the 1928 Winter Olympics.
