= Östnor =

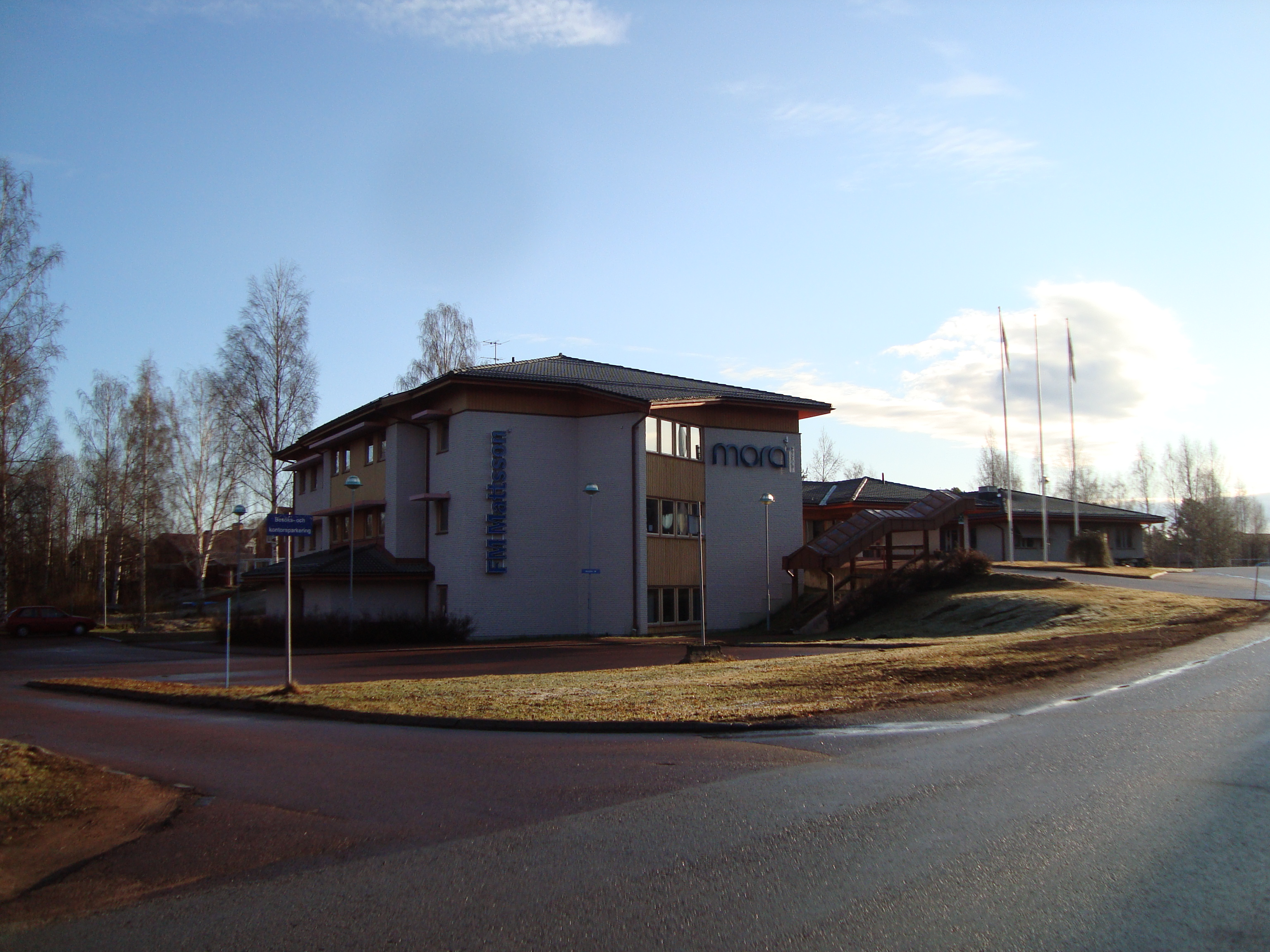

- Location within Dalarna Location within Sweden
- Coordinates: 61°01′40″N 14°29′19″E
- Country: Sweden
- Province: Dalarna
- County: Dalarna County
- Municipality: Mora Municipality

Area
  - Total: 1.25 km^{2} (0.48 sq mi)

Population (31 December 2010)
  - Total: 534
  - Density: 427/km^{2} (1,110/sq mi)
- Time zone: UTC+1 (CET)
  - Summer (DST): UTC+2 (CEST)

Östnor is a locality situated in Mora Municipality, Dalarna County, Sweden with 534 inhabitants in 2010.
