= Per-Erik Hedlund =

Swedish cross-country skier

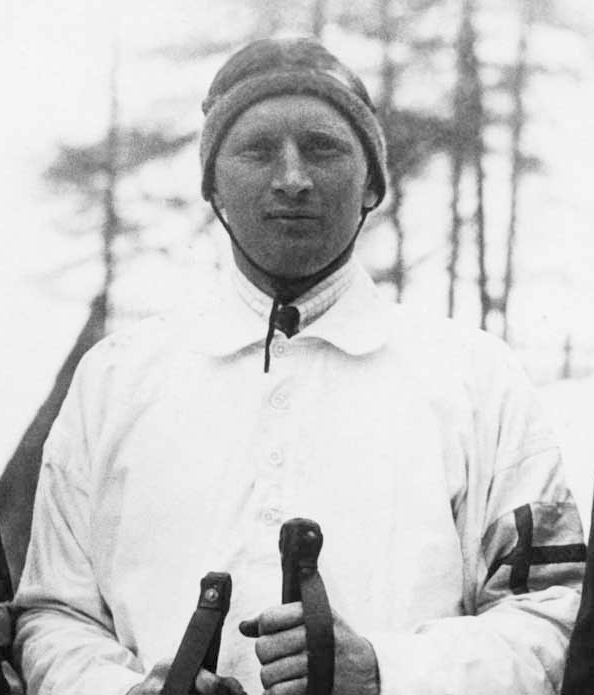
- Hedlund at the 1928 Olympics

Personal information
- Born: 18 April 1897 Särna, Sweden
- Died: 12 February 1975 (aged 77) Särna, Sweden

Sport
- Sport: Cross-country skiing
- Club: Särna SK
Medal record
Men's cross-country skiing
Representing Sweden
Olympic Games
Gold medal – first place	1928 St. Moritz	50 km
World Championships
Gold medal – first place	1933 Innsbruck	4 × 10 km relay

Per-Erik Hedlund (18 April 1897 – 12 February 1975) was a Swedish cross-country skier. He competed in the 18 and 50 km events at the 1924 and 1928 Olympics and won the gold medal over 50 km in 1928, more than 13 minutes ahead of fellow Swede Gustaf Jonsson. While competing, he wore a show-white outfit, which was later considered as lucky, and was worn by Swedish Nordic skiers at every Winter Olympics for the next 48 years.

Hedlund finished sixth in the 50 km event, but won the 4 × 10 km relay at the 1933 FIS Nordic World Ski Championships. He won the Vasa run in 1926 and 1928. In 1928 Hedlund wanted to share the victory with his best friend Sven Utterström. They crossed the finish line simultaneously, but gave up their medals after the jury decided to award gold to Hedlund. Hedlund won nine individual Swedish Championships over various distances. He received the Svenska Dagbladet Gold Medal in 1928.

In his prime Hedlund worked six days a week in the woods and skied on the seventh.

== Cross-country skiing results ==
All results are sourced from the International Ski Federation (FIS).

=== Olympic Games ===
- 1 medal – (1 gold)

Year	Age	18 km	50 km
1924	26	6	DNF
1928	30	6	Gold

=== World Championships ===
- 1 medal – (1 gold)

Year	Age	17 km	18 km	50 km	4 × 10 km relay
1930	32	24	—N/a	11	—N/a
1933	35	—N/a	9	6	Gold

Preceded by Sven Salén	Svenska Dagbladet Gold Medal; 1928	Succeeded by Gillis Grafström and Sven Utterström
