= Sakuta Takefushi =

Japanese cross-country skier (1906–1988)

Personal information
- Nationality: Japanese
- Born: 17 April 1906; Nagano, Japan
- Died: 12 August 1988 (aged 82)

Sport
- Sport: Cross-country skiing

Sakuta Takefushi (17 April 1906 – 12 August 1988) was a Japanese cross-country skier. He competed in the men's 18 kilometre event at the 1928 Winter Olympics.
