= Johan Grøttumsbråten =

Norwegian skier (1899–1983)

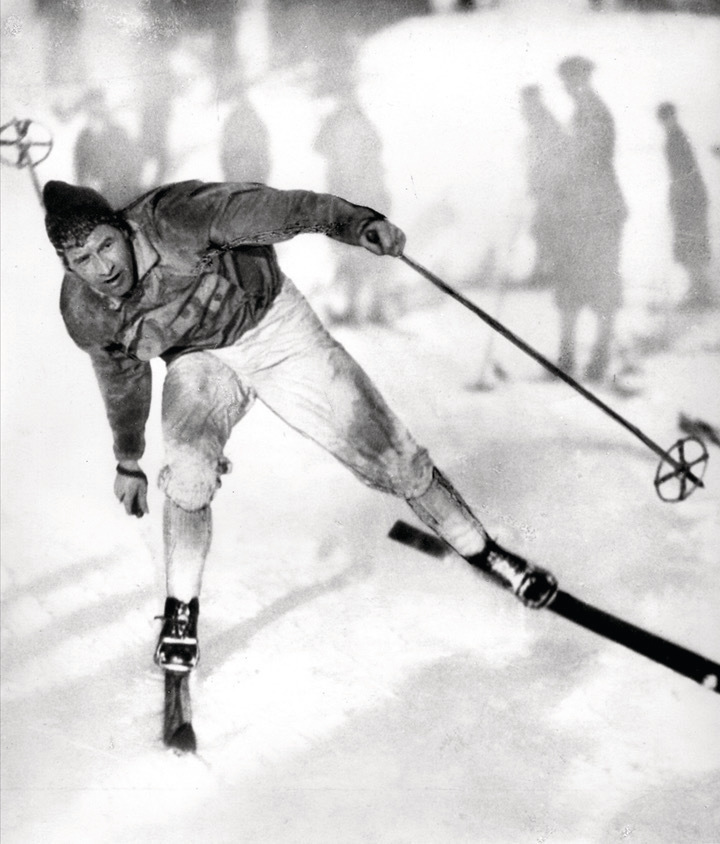
- Grøttumsbråten at the 1931 World Championships

Personal information
- Born: 24 February 1899 Sørkedalen, Norway
- Died: 24 January 1983 (aged 83) Vestre Aker, Norway
- Height: 180 cm (5 ft 11 in)

Sport
- Sport: Nordic skiing
- Club: IL i BUL
Medal record
Representing Norway
Men's cross-country skiing
Olympic Games
Gold medal – first place	1928 St. Moritz	18 km
Silver medal – second place	1924 Chamonix	18 km
Bronze medal – third place	1924 Chamonix	50 km
World Championships
Gold medal – first place	1931 Oberhof	18 km
Men's Nordic combined
Olympic Games
Gold medal – first place	1932 Lake Placid	Individual
Gold medal – first place	1928 St. Moritz	Individual
Bronze medal – third place	1924 Chamonix	Individual
World Championships
Gold medal – first place	1926 Lahti	Individual
Gold medal – first place	1931 Oberhof	Individual

Johan Hagbart Pedersen Grøttumsbraaten (24 February 1899 – 24 January 1983) was a Norwegian skier who competed in Nordic combined and cross-country. Dominating both events in the 1920s and early 1930s, he won several medals in the early Winter Olympics. Most notably, he won two gold medals at the 1928 Winter Olympics, and as one of the only two entrants to win two gold medalists from St. Moritz, was the most successful athlete there, along with Clas Thunberg of Finland. He previously won three medals (one silver, two bronzes) at the inaugural Winter Olympics held in Chamonix in 1924, and went on to defend his Olympic title in Nordic Combined Skiing at the 1932 Winter Olympics.

In addition, he won three gold medals at the FIS Nordic World Ski Championships: In 1931 he won both the cross-country 18 km and Nordic combined, after winning the Nordic combined event earlier in 1926.

Grøttumsbråten is one of only four people to ever win the Holmenkollen ski festival's Nordic combined event five times (1923, 1926, 1928, 1929 and 1931). In 1924, he shared the Holmenkollen medal with fellow Norwegian Nordic combined athlete Harald Økern.

== Cross-country skiing results ==
All results are sourced from the International Ski Federation (FIS).

=== Olympic Games ===
- 6 medals – (3 gold, 1 silver, 2 bronze)

Year	Age	18 km	50 km	Nordic combined (individual)
1924	25	Silver	Bronze	Bronze
1928	29	Gold	—	Gold
1932	33	6	—	Gold

=== World Championships ===
- 1 medal – (1 gold)

Year	Age	18 km	50 km
1931	32	Gold	—
