= Ole Hegge =

Norwegian skier (1898–1994)

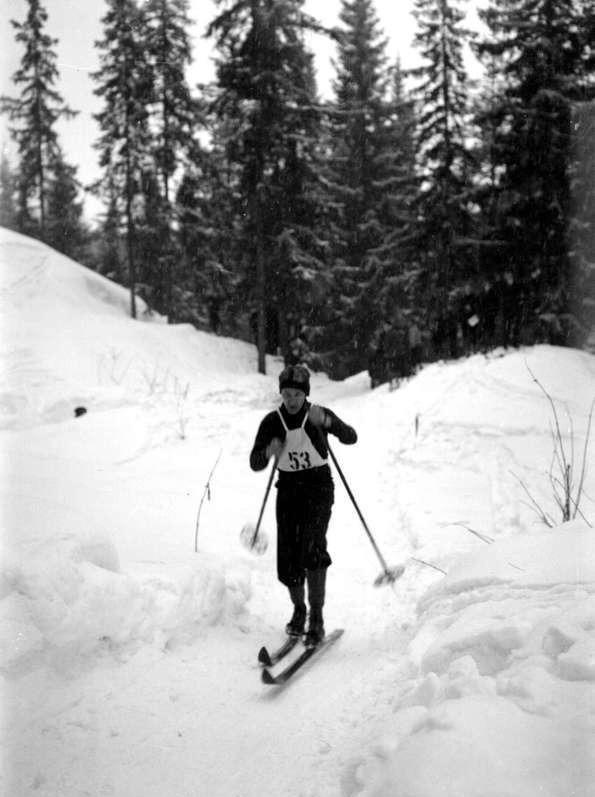

Medal record

Men's cross-country skiing

Representing Norway

Olympic Games
Silver medal – second place	1928 St. Moritz	18 km

Ole Hegge (September 3, 1898 – June 2, 1994) was a Norwegian cross-country skier and ski jumper who competed in the late 1920s and early 1930s.

Hegge was born in Bardu Municipality. His best-known finish was a silver medal in the 18 km event at the 1928 Winter Olympics in St. Moritz. Hegge also finished fifth in the 50 km event in 1928, fourth in the 50 km event at the 1932 Winter Olympics in Lake Placid, New York, and fourth in the 50 km event at the 1926 Nordic skiing World Championships. He died in Livingston, New York.

== Cross-country skiing results ==
All results are sourced from the International Ski Federation (FIS).

=== Olympic Games ===
- 1 medal – (1 silver)

Year	Age	18 km	50 km
1928	29	Silver	5
1932	33	—	4

=== World Championships ===
Year	Age	30 km	50 km
1926	27	10	4
