= Cross-country skiing at the 1928 Winter Olympics =

Cross-country skiing at the II Olympic Winter Games
- Dates: 14–17 February 1928
- No. of events: 2
- Competitors: 74 from 15 nations

At the 1928 Winter Olympics, two cross-country skiing events were contested. The 50 km competition was held on Tuesday, 14 February 1928 while the 18 km event was held on Friday, 17 February 1928.

== Medal summary ==
=== Medal table ===
Rank	Nation	Gold	Silver	Bronze	Total
1	Norway	1	1	1	3
1	Sweden	1	1	1	3
Totals (2 entries)		2	2	2	6

=== Events ===
Event	Gold		Silver		Bronze	
18 km	Johan Grøttumsbråten; Norway	1:37:01	Ole Hegge; Norway	1:39:01	Reidar Ødegaard; Norway	1:40:11
50 km	Per-Erik Hedlund; Sweden	4:52:03	Gustaf Jonsson; Sweden	5:05:30	Volger Andersson; Sweden	5:05:46

Hedlund's margin of victory is the largest in Olympic history (13 minutes, 27 seconds).

== Participating nations ==
Cross-country skiers from Austria, Canada, Hungary, and the United States only competed in the 18 km event. Nineteen cross-country skiers competed in both events.

A total of 74 cross-country skiers from 15 nations competed at the St. Moritz Games:

- Austria (1)
- Canada (2)
- Czechoslovakia (6)
- Finland (7)
- France (8)
- Germany (5)
- Hungary (1)
- Italy (4)
- Japan (5)
- Norway (7)
- Poland (4)
- Sweden (6)
- Switzerland (6)
- United States (3)
- Yugoslavia (6)
