= 1928 Winter Olympics =

Multi-sport event in Sankt Moritz, Switzerland

II Olympic Winter Games
- Hugo Laubi's poster for the 1928 Winter Olympics
- Location: St. Moritz, Switzerland
- Nations: 25
- Athletes: 467 (441 men, 26 women)
- Events: 14 (Note: Only 13 sets of medals were awarded, as the 10,000 metres speed skating competition was abandoned due to thawing ice.) in 4 sports (8 disciplines)
- Opening: 11 February 1928
- Closing: 19 February 1928
- Opened by: President Edmund Schulthess
- Stadium: St. Moritz Olympic Ice Rink

The 1928 Winter Olympics, officially known as the II Olympic Winter Games (French: II^{es} Jeux olympiques d'hiver; German: II. Olympische Winterspiele; Italian: II Giochi olimpici invernali; Romansh: II Gieus olimpics d'enviern) and commonly known as St. Moritz 1928 (French: Saint-Moritz 1928; Romansh: San Murezzan 1928), were an international winter multi-sport event that was celebrated from 11 to 19 February 1928 in St. Moritz, Switzerland.

The 1928 Games were the first true Winter Olympics to be held as a stand-alone event, not in conjunction with a Summer Olympics. The preceding 1924 Winter Games were retroactively renamed the inaugural Winter Olympics, although they had in fact been organised alongside the 1924 Summer Olympics in France. Before 1924, the winter events were included in the schedule of the Summer Games and there were no separate Winter Games. The 1928 Winter Games also replaced the now redundant Nordic Games, which had been held at varying intervals since early in the 20th century.

The hosts were challenged by fluctuating weather conditions; the opening ceremony was held in a blizzard, while warm weather conditions plagued sporting events throughout the rest of the Games. The 10,000 metre speed-skating event was controversially abandoned and officially cancelled. Filmed footage of the games exists in a silent, feature-length documentary, The White Stadium.

== Highlights ==
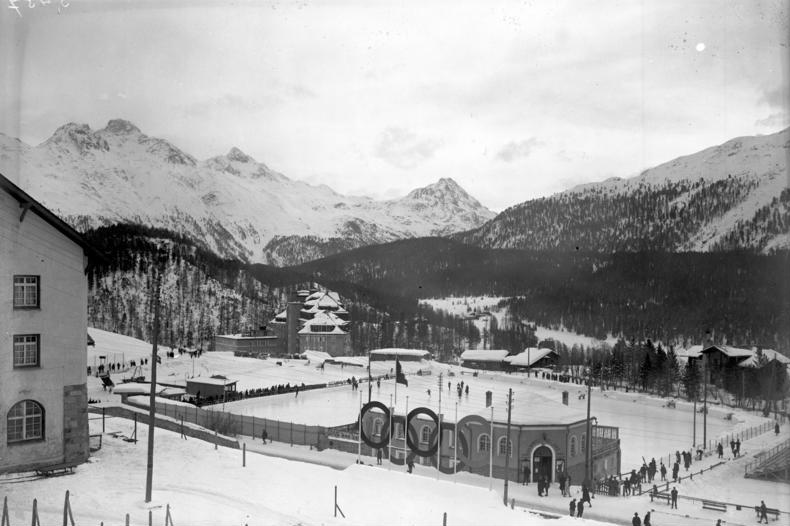
1928 St. Moritz venue

- Sonja Henie of Norway returned to the Winter Olympics, having taken part in 1924 at the age of 11, and made history by winning the ladies' figure skating aged 15. She became the youngest Olympic champion in history (a distinction she held for 70 years), and went on to defend her title at the next two Winter Olympics.
- Norway's Ivar Ballangrud won the Olympic title in the 5,000-metre speed skating event, and Clas Thunberg of Finland won both the 500 m and the 1,500 m.
- Norway finished at the top of the medal table with a total of six gold medals, four silver, and five bronze, totalling 15 medals. The United States finished second in the table with six medals overall.
- Switzerland won a single bronze medal, the lowest medal haul by a host nation at any Olympic Games.
- American Irving Jaffee was leading the 10,000-metre speed skating race, having outskated Norwegian defending world champion Bernt Evensen in their heat, when rising temperatures thawed the ice. In a controversial ruling, the Norwegian referee cancelled the entire competition; the International Olympic Committee stepped in to reverse the referee's decision and awarded Jaffee the gold medal, but the International Skating Union later overruled the IOC and restored the ruling. Evensen, for his part, stated publicly that Jaffee should be awarded the gold medal, but that did not happen.

== Events ==
Medals were awarded in 14 events contested in 4 sports (8 disciplines).

- Bobsleigh
  - Bobsleigh (1) ()
  - Skeleton (1) ()
- Ice hockey (1) ()
- Ice skating
  - Figure skating (3) ()
  - Speed skating (4) ()
- Nordic skiing ()
  - Cross-country skiing (2) ()
  - Nordic combined (1) ()
  - Ski jumping (1) ()

=== Demonstration sports ===
- Military patrol
- Skijoring

== Venues ==
- St. Moritz Olympic Ice Rink – Figure skating, Ice hockey, Speed skating
- Around the hills of St. Moritz – Cross-country skiing, Nordic combined (cross-country skiing)
- Olympiaschanze St. Moritz – Nordic combined (ski jumping), Ski jumping
- St. Moritz-Celerina Olympic Bobrun – Bobsleigh
- Cresta Run – Skeleton

== Participating nations ==
Athletes from 25 nations competed at these Games, up from 16 in 1924. Nations making their first appearance at the Winter Olympic Games were Argentina (first participation of a delegation coming from a country belonging to the Southern Hemisphere), Estonia, Germany, Japan, Lithuania, Luxembourg, Mexico, the Netherlands, and Romania.

Participating National Olympic Committees
- Argentina (10)
- Austria (39)
- Belgium (25)
- Canada (23)
- Czechoslovakia (29)
- Estonia (2)
- Finland (18)
- France (38)
- Germany (44)
- Great Britain (32)
- Hungary (13)
- Italy (13)
- Japan (6)
- Latvia (1)
- Lithuania (1)
- Luxembourg (5)
- Mexico (5)
- Netherlands (7)
- Norway (25)
- Poland (26)
- Romania (10)
- Sweden (24)
- Switzerland (41) (host)
- United States (24)
- Yugoslavia (6)

=== Number of athletes by National Olympic Committees ===
IOC Letter Code	Country	Athletes
GER	Germany	44
SUI	Switzerland	41
AUT	Austria	39
FRA	France	38
GBR	Great Britain	32
TCH	Czechoslovakia	29
POL	Poland	26
BEL	Belgium	25
NOR	Norway	25
SWE	Sweden	24
USA	United States	24
CAN	Canada	23
FIN	Finland	18
HUN	Hungary	13
ITA	Italy	13
ARG	Argentina	10
ROM	Romania	10
NED	Netherlands	7
JPN	Japan	6
YUG	Yugoslavia	6
LUX	Luxembourg	5
MEX	Mexico	5
EST	Estonia	2
LAT	Latvia	1
LTU	Lithuania	1
Total		464

== Medal count ==
* Host nation (Switzerland)

Rank	Nation	Gold	Silver	Bronze	Total
1	Norway	6	4	5	15
2	United States	2	2	2	6
3	Sweden	2	2	1	5
4	Finland	2	1	1	4
5	Canada	1	0	0	1
5	France	1	0	0	1
7	Austria	0	3	1	4
8	Belgium	0	0	1	1
8	Czechoslovakia	0	0	1	1
8	Germany	0	0	1	1
8	Great Britain	0	0	1	1
8	Switzerland*	0	0	1	1
Totals (12 entries)		14	12	15	41

=== Podium sweeps ===
Date	Sport	Event	NOC	Gold	Silver	Bronze
14 February	Cross-country skiing	Men's 50 kilometre	Sweden	Per-Erik Hedlund	Gustaf Jonsson	Volger Andersson
17 February	Cross-country skiing	Men's 18 kilometre	Norway	Johan Grøttumsbråten	Ole Hegge	Reidar Ødegaard
18 February	Nordic combined	Individual	Norway	Johan Grøttumsbråten	Hans Vinjarengen	Jon Snersrud

== See also ==
- List of 1928 Winter Olympics medal winners
- 1928 Summer Olympics
- Olympic Games held in Switzerland
  - 1928 Winter Olympics – St. Moritz
  - 1948 Winter Olympics – St. Moritz
- List of IOC country codes

== Notes ==
Winter Olympics
Preceded by Chamonix	II Olympic Winter Games; St. Moritz; 1928	Succeeded by Lake Placid
