= Woodstock Country School =

Co-educational college preparatory school in Vermont

Location
- 106108 South Rd. South Woodstock, Vermont 05071; United States
- Coordinates: 43°33′22.5″N 72°32′32.3″W

Information
- Type: Private, Co-ed
- Founded: 1945
- Closed: 1980
- Enrollment: ~100

Woodstock Country School (WCS), founded in 1945, was a small, progressive, co-educational preparatory boarding school (grades 9–12) initially located in the village of Woodstock, Vermont, and later on a 400-acre farm campus in the nearby hamlet of South Woodstock. WCS was "acknowledged as a leader in the progressive education movement" and in the 1960s "gained national recognition for its open curriculum."

Having been co-founded by an alumnus of the highly experimental Black Mountain College, and with a former Black Mountain professor (the co-founder's wife) on the founding faculty, the initial vision of the school might be interpreted as attempting to bring a version of the Black Mountain experience to the secondary education realm.

In the mid-1960s the school introduced North America's first-ever four-term 12-month academic year, known as the Woodstock Plan.

WCS closed after graduating its final class in August, 1980.

== History ==
=== Founding ===
Three people played key roles in the founding of Woodstock Country School.

- Kenneth Webb, a Quaker and Harvard-trained teacher with experience at preparatory schools such as Peddie School, who with his wife Susan founded Quaker-based summer camps in and around Plymouth, Vermont, that came to be known as Farm & Wilderness camps. The Webbs shared a dream of someday starting a progressive school, and in 1944, after moving his family to Woodstock, Vermont, Ken Webb began drafting a prospectus for the school they envisioned.
- Elizabeth Forrest Johnson, a Vassar-trained teacher and school administrator who came to live full time in Woodstock after retiring as Headmistress of The Baldwin School. Johnson took an interest in Webb's proposal for a school and became a mentor to him. Johnson evangelized prominent Woodstock residents to provide startup funding for the school, and became a founding trustee.
- David Welles Bailey, an alumnus of the very progressive Black Mountain College and teacher at Lawrenceville School. At the relatively young age of 32, Bailey was also nurturing dreams of founding a progressive preparatory school "with the spirit of Black Mountain". Johnson encouraged Bailey and Webb to join forces in founding the school they separately were envisioning.

A 19-room former inn known as "Greenhithe," near the center of Woodstock, with a barn that could be adapted into an additional dormitory, was acquired as the initial campus for the school, which took in its first class in September, 1945.

Soon after the launch of WCS, tensions began to appear between David Bailey and Ken Webb over how the school should operate. These continued to escalate, and by 1947 Webb tendered his resignation as co-director and trustee, leaving Bailey as the sole leader and visionary of the school until his retirement, for health reasons, in 1967.

In November 1954, the school's principal classroom building burned to the ground. This triggered the trustees and faculty to begin exploring options including new construction at the current site or moving the school to a new location. During this process, David Bailey learned that Upwey Farms, a horse-breeding farm of about 400 acres in the hamlet of South Woodstock, about 5 miles south of Woodstock's central Village Green, might be for sale. While another alternative was preferred by the faculty, Bailey continued to press for the Upwey choice, while simultaneously negotiating with its owners. He ultimately prevailed. By the start of the fall term in 1955, the school had moved into the Upwey property, even though construction was still underway. (The Upwey property had once belonged to Owen Moon, who had been instrumental in getting WCS launched. Moon's house on the property, which for many years served WCS as a girls dorm, has since been registered on the National Register of Historic Places.)

=== Later headmasters ===
Following David Bailey's stepping down, WCS had 6 subsequent headmasters prior to its closing in 1980.

- John Holden - 1967-1968 - The co-founder of the Colorado Rocky Mountain School served as interim headmaster in the school year following David Bailey's retirement. (Holden's son, Ben, had previously taught at WCS.)
- William "Tawny" Kilborne - 1968–1970
- Phil Hansen - 1970–1974
- Walter Hill - 1975-1976
- Robert 'Robin' Leaver - 1976–1980
- John Chater - 1980 - had a very brief tenure in the final days of the school.

== "The Woodstock Plan" ==
In the mid-1960s David Bailey and others began thinking seriously of adding a fourth academic term in the summer, becoming a year-round school. Explorations of the idea were funded in part by a grant from the Fund for the Advancement of Education. While this concept had long been under discussion by educators, it was said that Woodstock Country School "introduced North America’s first-ever four-semester, 12-month academic year, ... known as the Woodstock Plan." In a letter appealing to a potential funder, trustee (and alumnus) Gerry Freund described the approach:

"Henceforth the Woodstock Country School will make full use of its human and physical resources the year round with a full complement of students and faculty on campus in each quarter of the 12-months academic year. ... It is typical of [the school] to attempt a pilot project effort which may be of significance to the nation."

The Plan was launched with the 1966–1967 school year and was continued in some form until the late 1970s, when it was abandoned as "an expensive and destructive failed experiment". The year round concept it envisioned did not catch on widely and remains fairly rare in the United States.

== Academics ==
A 1973 advertisement for the school in The New York Times Magazine described its offerings as "a full elective academic curriculum with special strengths in the humanities, arts, music, drama, the environmental and natural sciences, as well as opportunities for independent study." In addition to typical college prep courses, more unusual classes were offered from time to time, such as Arabic and Mandarin Chinese, often as the result of a particular expertise found among a given year's faculty. When Afro-American History was available as an elective it became the most fully-enrolled course WCS ever offered.

Learning opportunities often veered well off the path of classic curricula. For example, a "Sheep to Shawl" class explored the continuum from caring for and shearing sheep to the wool then spun and woven into wearables, and in "Wild Plants" students scoured the nearby woods to learn about plants growing there. Work on the school's farm also provided learning opportunities for some; one student shared a recollection about the farm manager's lessons on the right way to plow sideways furrows on a hillside.

== Culture ==
The school "allowed adolescents great freedom to experiment with adult behaviors of all sorts, without significant restriction or confinement except at the extremes; with positive reinforcement and expectations, personally and academically; but without confusing the students with actual adults."

Students, faculty and staff called each other by their first names.

Students were required to participate in significant ways in the daily operations of the school, including janitorial and food service functions. A student "work job" committee assigned each student a daily task, such as sweeping and general upkeep of a pair of classrooms, or waiting table, or working on the dish washing crew or as cook's assistant. The duration of these assignments varied—two weeks in some eras of the school, a full term in others—after which a new set of assignments was posted. In addition, there were weekly assignments for more intensive tasks, such as floor mopping, which were performed during after-class afternoons, with half the students doing these early in the week and the remaining half later in the week. Some tasks could be in the school's farm operations, such as in the horse barn and chicken coop. Boarding students would also have upkeep tasks assigned in their dormitories.

In earlier years the school operated with a calendar of 10-week trimesters in Fall, Winter and Spring. After implementation of the four-term Woodstock Plan, a fourth 10-week term as added for Summer. Monday through Saturday the class schedule was four periods between 8am and 1pm, followed by lunch and afternoon activities.

Interscholastic athletic opportunities were available for both male and female students. For boys there was soccer in fall, ice hockey in winter, and baseball in spring. Girls had field hockey in fall and softball in the spring. In Vermont ski country, many students chose to participate in skiing during snow season. There were two rope tows on modest hills on the campus that operated occasionally, as well as access to local ski areas such as Suicide Six.

== Final years ==
As suggested by the multiple headmasters in the school's last dozen years, WCS was in flux and some turmoil after David Bailey's retirement. The school was often in financial straits, especially as the 1970s were ending. To keep the school going, appeals to prior financial supporters, including Woodstock resident Laurance Rockefeller, were not successful.

On December 5, 1981, the nine remaining trustees voted to dissolve Woodstock Country School, Inc. In the following years, what had been the school's main "Upwey" building with classrooms, dining facilities, offices and a theater was reconverted to its original existence as horse barns. These are now occupied by the adjacent Green Mountain Horse Association. Much of the school's former land is now in a conservation trust.

== Notable faculty ==
- Elizabeth Dennison "Buffy" Dunker - taught music and managed school business affairs, in later years moved to Cambridge, Massachusetts, trained as a nationally recognized feminist therapist, came out as a lesbian at age 70 and became an advocate for the "older LGBTQ community."
- Richard Farrar - head of science department, an ornithologist who was executive director of the Vermont Institute of Natural Science.
- E. Lovett Garceau - co-inventor at Harvard of the electro-encephalograph, in his retirement taught geometry at WCS.
- Rus Mead - later headmaster at Concord Academy, taught English.
- Lowell Naeve - artist, author, WWII conscientious objector - taught art for several years
- Mounir Sa'adah - joined the founding faculty in 1946 and taught history for 18 years. An ordained minister in the Unitarian Universalist Church, Mounir also led WCS's Sunday vespers services.
- Peter Sauer - later a science teacher at Bank Street School, author of science books for children, and executive director of Wave Hill, taught science and English and was head of a boys dormitory.
- Mary Louise Shoolery - later became co-director of Six Rivers Ranch and School in California and author of "The Wisdom of Loving", taught Eastern religion and led "Celebration of Life" weekends.
- Isabella McLaughlin Stephens - a second generation historian (her father was Pulitzer Prize winning president of the American Historical Association, Andrew McLaughlin, and her sister Constance McLaughlin Green was also a Pulitzer-winning historian), taught history.
- Rockwell Stephens - previously a journalist and ski entrepreneur, taught mechanical drawing and coached the ski team.

== Notable alumni ==
- Susan Bottomly - (aka "International Velvet") model and actress
- Phil Bronstein - journalist and editor
- Sandy Bull - folk musician and composer
- Susan Cheever - author
- Kathy Cronkite - actress, mental health professional
- Severn Darden - comedian and actor
- Thomas Edsall - journalist and academic
- Deborah Eisenberg - short story writer, actress, teacher
- Amy Ephron - novelist, screenwriter, journalist, film producer
- Larry Hagman - actor, director, producer
- Jameson Parker - actor
- Joe Schenkman - cartoonist, publisher
- Mika Seeger - ceramic artist
- Mike Seeger - folk musician and folklorist
- Peggy Seeger - folk singer, songwriter
- Helen Shiller - Chicago politician, author
- Amy Wallace - writer
- David Sloan Wilson - evolutionary biologist
