= Champions: A Love Story =

1979 television film by John A. Alonzo

- Genre: Drama; Sport
- Screenplay by: John Sacret Young
- Directed by: John A. Alonzo
- Starring: Jimmy McNichol; Shirley Knight; Tony Lo Bianco; Anne Schedeen
- Theme music composer: John Rubinstein
- Country of origin: United States
- Original language: English

Production
- Executive producer: Philip Mandelker
- Producer: John Sacret Young
- Cinematography: John A. Alonzo
- Editor: Bernard J. Small
- Running time: 100 minutes
- Production company: Warner Bros. Television

Original release
- Network: CBS
- Release: January 13, 1979

Champions: A Love Story is a 1979 American made-for-television drama sport film directed by John A. Alonzo and starring Shirley Knight, Tony Lo Bianco, Jimmy McNichol, Joy LeDuc, and Anne Schedeen.

== Plot ==
Peter is a teenage ex-hockey player who falls in love with Carrie, a figure skater.

== Cast ==
- Shirley Knight as Barbara Harlich
- Tony Lo Bianco as Damschroeder
- Jimmy McNichol as Peter Scoggin III
- Joy LeDuc as Carrie Harlich
- Anne Schedeen as Diane Kachatorian
- Jennifer Warren as Camille Scoggin
- Richard Jaeckel as Peter Scoggin Jr.
- Philip Brown as Ernie Perella
- Elizabeth Cheshire as Lisa
- Tiffany Ann Francis as Laura
- Missy Francis as Sally
- Eddie Deezen as Eric Philpot

== Production ==
The film's screenplay was written by television writer and producer John Sacret Young, who himself was a former hockey player. Prior to writing the screenplay, Young had been unsuccessfully working as a novelist in Vermont. Commenting on the setting, Young said: "Skating is filled with stories that are very intense - the romances, the hatreds. I don't think that story's ever been told. Skating is a loose fraternity. They share something, the early morning practice, the rigorous training. It's like war veterans without the pall of death."

Young spent six months frequenting ice skating rinks in Colorado, and based many of the characters in the film real people he met there: "You go to any rink and 6 a.m. and here are these burly women in overcoats. They give their lives to this." Young was partly inspired to write the film after the 1961 Sabena Flight 548 plane crash that killed the entire U.S. Figure Skating team.

== Reception ==
People magazine deemed the film a "surprisingly compelling 1979 TV movie." Jerry Buck of the Associated Press praised the film as "a warm story that bursts at the seams with vitality and life."
