= A Constitutional History of the United States =

History book by Andrew C. McLaughlin

- Author: Andrew C. McLaughlin
- Language: English
- Genre: Non-fiction
- Publication date: 1936
- Publication place: United States

A Constitutional History of the United States is a nonfiction history book by Andrew C. McLaughlin. It won the 1936 Pulitzer Prize for History.
