= John A. Alonzo =

American cinematographer (1934–2001)

- Born: John Ayala Alonzo; June 12, 1934; Dallas, Texas, U.S.
- Died: March 13, 2001 (aged 66); Brentwood, California, U.S.
- Occupations: Cinematographer; actor; director
- Years active: 1967–2001
- Spouse(s): Suzanne Heltzel (1954–1966); Jan Murray (?–2001; his death)
- Children: Gorgiana Alonzo; Angela Argenzia; Cristiana Murray

John Ayala Alonzo, ASC (June 12, 1934 – March 13, 2001) was an American cinematographer, television director, and actor.

He was known for his naturalistic, Cinéma vérité-inspired photography featured in several works during the New Hollywood movement, being nominated for the Academy Award for Best Cinematography on Roman Polanski's film Chinatown (1974).

In addition to films, Alonzo also innovated the use of high-definition video in television production.

Alonzo was also the first American cinematographer of Mexican descent to become a member of the Cinematographer's Union in Los Angeles, as well as the first to be inducted into the ASC.

== Early life ==
Alonzo was born in Dallas, Texas, as the son of Mexican immigrants Román Palomo Alonzo and María Alonzo, and was raised both in Dallas and in Guadalajara, Mexico.

He graduated from North Dallas High School in 1953.

== Career ==
Alonzo's career began as part of the clean-up crew at television station WFAA in Dallas, but within a short time, he had made himself indispensable, not only building sets, hanging lights and moving cameras, but also directing cooking and children's shows.

Eventually, he and actor Hank Williamson created a popular comedy duo: Alonzo became the voice and puppeteer of the irreverent "Señor Turtle", introduced movies and cartoons, with Williamson as his sidekick. In 1956, the show was picked up by station KHJ in Hollywood, where it lasted only 26 weeks. During this time, Alonzo worked as a still photographer and as an actor, with appearances in several well-known shows like The Twilight Zone, Combat!, 77 Sunset Strip, and The Alfred Hitchcock Hour.

A seminal moment came during the shooting of The Magnificent Seven, in which Alonzo had a small role, but had the chance to meet cinematographer Charles Lang. This encounter, as well as the chance to briefly collaborate with James Wong Howe a few years later, gave Alonzo the input to make a career around cinematography. This included having director Martin Ritt as a mentor before collaborating with him in his movies

By the mid-1960s, he was working on many documentaries for National Geographic and David L. Wolper's company. His work greatly influenced the innovative "look" of the New Hollywood era.

His uncomplicated and minimalistic style, combined with his first-hand knowledge of acting, made him one of the most in-demand cinematographers in Hollywood.

In addition to films, Alonzo was also a pioneer of high-def digital cinematography, with NBC's World War II: When Lions Roared being the first HD movie in the history of American television.

== Death and legacy ==
Alonzo died in 2001 after a long illness, at home in Brentwood, California.

In 2007, director Axel Schill helmed a feature documentary about Alonzo, The Man Who Shot Chinatown – The Life & Work of John A. Alonzo.

Two-time Oscar winner John Toll, began his career as Alonzo's assistant, working on films like Black Sunday, Norma Rae, Tom Horn and Scarface.

== Filmography ==
=== Short film ===
Year	Title	Director
1965	The Legend of Jimmy Blue Eyes	Robert Clouse
2000	The Dancing Cow	Taz Goldstein

=== Feature film ===
Director

- FM (1978)

Cinematographer

Year	Title	Director
1970	Bloody Mama	Roger Corman
1971	Vanishing Point	Richard C. Sarafian
1971	Harold and Maude	Hal Ashby
1972	Get to Know Your Rabbit	Brian De Palma
1972	Sounder	Martin Ritt
1972	Another Nice Mess	Bob Einstein
1972	Lady Sings the Blues	Sidney J. Furie
1972	Pete 'n' Tillie	Martin Ritt
1973	The Naked Ape	Donald Driver
1973	Hit!	Sidney J. Furie
1974	Conrack	Martin Ritt
1974	Chinatown	Roman Polanski
1975	The Fortune	Mike Nichols
1975	Once Is Not Enough	Guy Green
1975	Farewell, My Lovely	Dick Richards
1976	I Will, I Will... for Now	Norman Panama
1976	The Bad News Bears	Michael Ritchie
1977	Black Sunday	John Frankenheimer
1977	Which Way Is Up?	Michael Schultz
1977	Beyond Reason	Telly Savalas
1978	Casey's Shadow	Martin Ritt
1978	The Cheap Detective	Robert Moore
1979	Norma Rae	Martin Ritt
1980	Tom Horn	William Wiard
1981	Back Roads	Martin Ritt
1981	Zorro, The Gay Blade	Peter Medak
1983	Blue Thunder	John Badham
1983	Cross Creek	Martin Ritt
1983	Scarface	Brian De Palma
1984	Out of Control	Allan Holzman
1984	Runaway	Michael Crichton
1986	Jo Jo Dancer, Your Life Is Calling	Richard Pryor
1986	Nothing in Common	Garry Marshall
1987	Real Men	Dennis Feldman
1987	Overboard	Garry Marshall
1989	Physical Evidence	Michael Crichton
1989	Steel Magnolias	Herbert Ross
1990	Internal Affairs	Mike Figgis
1990	The Guardian	William Friedkin
1990	Navy SEALs	Lewis Teague
1992	Housesitter	Frank Oz
1992	Cool World	Ralph Bakshi
1993	The Meteor Man	Robert Townsend
1994	Clifford	Paul Flaherty
1994	Star Trek: Generations	David Carson
1995	The Grass Harp	Charles Matthau
1998	Letters from a Killer	David Carson
2000	The Prime Gig	Gregory Mosher
2002	Deuces Wild *	Scott Kalvert

* Posthumous release

Acting roles

Year	Title	Role	Notes
1958	The Gun Runners	Soldier in Car	Uncredited
1960	The Crowded Sky	Young Repairman	Uncredited
1960	The Magnificent Seven	Miguel	
1961	The Long Rope	Manuel Alvarez	
1961	Susan Slade	Engineer	Uncredited
1962	Hand of Death	Carlos, lab assistant	
1962	Terror at Black Falls	Carlos Avila	
1964	Invitation to a Gunfighter	Manuel	

=== Television ===
TV movies

Year	Title	Director
1969	The World of Peggy Lee	Nick Cominos
1971	Cannon	George McCowan
1971	Revenge!	Jud Taylor
1972	Visions...	Lee H. Katzin
1973	Voyage of the Yes	Lee H. Katzin
1973	Guess Who's Sleeping in My Bed?	Theodore J. Flicker
1976	Look What's Happened to Rosemary's Baby	Sam O'Steen
1979	Champions: A Love Story	Himself
1979	Portrait of a Stripper	Himself
1980	Belle Starr	Himself
1980	Blinded by the Light	Himself
1982	The Kid From Nowhere	Beau Bridges
1988	Roots: The Gift	Kevin Hooks
1999	Lansky	John McNaughton
2000	Fail Safe	Stephen Frears

TV series

Year	Title	Director	Notes
1988	Knightwatch	Farhad Mann	Episode "Knights of the City"
1994	World War II: When Lions Roared	Joseph Sargent	Miniseries

Acting credits

Year	Title	Role	Notes
1958	Dragnet		Episode "The Big Border"
1959	Westinghouse Desilu Playhouse		Episode "Ballad for a Bad Man"
1959	Border Patrol	Pete	Episode "A Bundle of Dope"
1959	The Thin Man	Bellboy	Episode "Cold Cargo"
1960	Perry Mason	Pedro Guitterez	Episode "The Case of the Prudent Prosecutor"
1961	The Twilight Zone	Luis Gallegos	Episode "Dust"
1961	Route 66	Juan Domingo	Episode "Most Vanquished, Most Victorious"
1961	Bronco	Tony Gomez	Episode "Guns of the Lawless"
1961	Cheyenne	Rico	Episode "Winchester Quarantine"
1961	Ripcord	Amendarez	Episode "Top Secret"
1962	Combat!	Bialos	Episodes "Cat and Mouse" and "The Prisoner"
1962–63	The Gallant Men	Cpl. Marsh / Sgt. Morales	Episodes "And Cain Cried Out" and "The Crucible"
1963	77 Sunset Strip	Carlos Escheveria	Episode "The Man Who Wasn't There"
1963–64	Kraft Suspense Theatre	Officer Miller / Cpl. Jack Osante	Episodes "The Long, Lost Life of Edward Smalley" and "Once Upon a Savage Night"
1964	Temple Houston	Long Maned Pony	Episode "Last Full Moon"
1964	Nightmare in Chicago	Officer Miller	TV movie
1964	Alfred Hitchcock Presents	The Intern	Episode "The Gentleman from America"
1964	Destry	Jose	Episode "Ride to Rio Verde"
1966–67	The Wild Wild West	Lightnin' McCoy / Sarrkan	Episodes "The Night of the Golden Cobra" and "The Night of the Surreal McCoy"
1967	Bewitched	Guard	Episode "Art for Sam's Sake"
1969	Bracken's World	Cameraman	Episode "The Chase Sequence"

=== Documentary works ===
TV movies

Year	Title	Director	Notes
1966	The World of Animals: It's a Dog's World	Alan Landsburg; Joseph L. Scanlan	With Vilis Lapenieks
1967	Do Blonds Have More Fun?	Mel Ferber	With Vilis Lapenieks, Stan Lazan and Kenneth Van Sickle
1967	A Nation of Immigrants	Robert Abel; Aram Boyajian; Mel Stuart	With Les Blank, Adam Giffard and Vilis Lapenieks
1967	The Big Land	David H. Vowell	With Vilis Lapenieks and Stan Lazan
1968	The World of Animals: The World of Horses	Joseph L. Scanlan	With David Blewitt and Dieter Perschke
1968	Sophia: A Self-Portrait	Robert Abel; Mel Stuart	With Roberto Gerardi
1968	The World of Animals: Big Cats, Little Cats	Bud Wiser	With David Blewitt, Robert Grant, J. Barry Herron, Fred Kaplan and Vilmos Zsigmond
1972	Hollywood: The Dream Factory		With Jim Wilson

TV series

Year	Title	Director	Notes
1967–69	National Geographic Specials	Irwin Rosten; Jeff Myrow; Walon Green; Heinz Sielmann; Himself	4 episodes
1968	The Undersea World of Jacques Cousteau	Patrick Watson	Episode "Search in the Deep"

Short film

Year	Title	Director
1968	San Sebastian 1746 in 1968	Floyd L. Peterson
1969	The Moviemakers	Jay Anson

Film

Year	Title	Director	Notes
1973	Wattstax	Mel Stuart	Concert film
1984	Terror in the Aisles	Andrew J. Kuehn	
1986	50 Years of Action!	Douglass M. Stewart Jr.	With Charlie Clifton and Caleb Deschanel

== Awards and nominations ==
Year	Award	Category	Title	Result
1974	Academy Awards	Best Cinematography	Chinatown	Nominated
1974	BAFTA Awards	Best Cinematography	Chinatown	Nominated
1994	Primetime Emmy Awards	Outstanding Cinematography for a Limited Series or Movie	World War II: When Lions Roared	Nominated
1999	Primetime Emmy Awards	Outstanding Cinematography for a Limited Series or Movie	Lansky	Won
2000	Primetime Emmy Awards	Primetime Emmy Award for Outstanding Light Direction	Fail Safe	Won
