= Aligned Archetype =

Studio album by Kellee Maize
- Released: January 10, 2010
- Recorded: 2009–2010
- Genre: Hip hop/rap
- Length: 76:42
- Label: Independent
- Producers: DJ Huggy, King Tut, Scottie B

Kellee Maize chronology
Age of Feminine (2007)	Aligned Archetype (2010)	Integration (2011)

Aligned Archetype is the second studio album by American rapper Kellee Maize. It was released for free download on January 29, 2010. The album features the sounds of dubstep, hip hop, and Baltimore club. The sound has been compared to a mix between Lady Gaga, M.I.A. and Uffie. Local producers including King Tut and Scottie B worked with Kellee during the recording process. The first single was “Third Eye,” which received positive feedback and remains one of Kellee’s most popular songs to date. The album was the most downloaded hip-hop album on Amazon.com for several weeks after its release and debuted at number 12 on Amazon's Top 100. Aligned Archetype has been downloaded over 150,000 on Frostclick alone Across all sites, Aligned Archetype has been downloaded over 300,000 times.

At the album release party at the FATE Lounge in Pittsburgh, Maize performed and switched wardrobes throughout the set to represent each of the five archetypes featured on the album. A review on FrostClick classified the album as "...bursting at the seams with originality. Aside from her mind-blowing rapping, Kellee has a singing voice to rival even the most talented pop stars, and she shows it off in just the right amounts."

== Track listing ==
No.	Title	Writer(s)	Length
1.	"Open Minded Medal (Intro)"	Kellee Maize	0:26
2.	"Future (Remix)"	Maize	4:20
3.	"Start None"	Maize	4:59
4.	"Signs"	Maize	4:37
5.	"Mothership"	Maize	3:38
6.	"Goddette"	Maize	3:56
7.	"Say Watcha Want"	Maize	4:31
8.	"City of Champions"	Maize	4:17
9.	"Big Plans"	Maize	3:09
10.	"Friday Night Flu (Remix)"	Maize	4:30
11.	"Third Eye"	Maize	4:38
12.	"Thought to Thing"	Maize	5:12
13.	"Freakuency"	Maize	3:45
14.	"Struggle (Remix)"	Maize	4:15
15.	"Something Sacred"	Maize	4:20
16.	"Evolution (Remix)"	Maize	3:59
17.	"Pulse"	Maize	4:17
18.	"Eleven 11"	Maize	3:44
19.	"Thx Bobos"	Maize	0:30
20.	"Big Plans (Remix)"	Maize	3:23
21.	"Dedication"	Maize	0:16
