= Charles Proctor =

American skier (1906–1996)

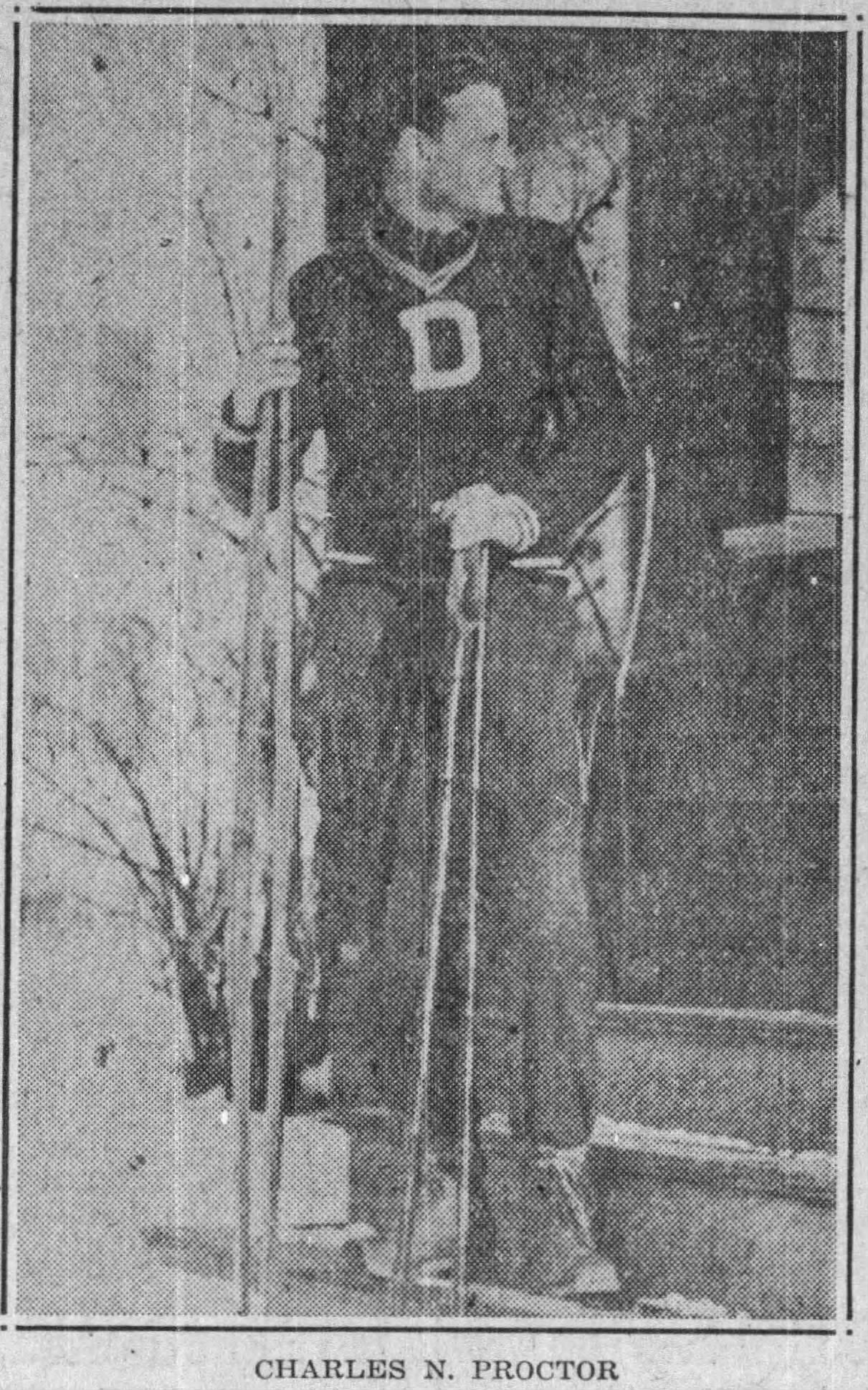

Personal information
- Born: January 4, 1906 Columbia, Missouri, United States
- Died: February 1, 1996 (aged 90) Scotts Valley, California, United States

Sport
- Sport: Skiing

Charles Nancrede Proctor (January 4, 1906 – February 1, 1996) was an American skier. He competed at the 1928 Winter Olympics.

Proctor attended Dartmouth College and was the son of a Dartmouth professor, Charles A. Proctor. Charles Proctor senior was a physics professor who advised the Dartmouth Ski Team and pioneered alpine skiing, establishing one of the first slalom races in 1925.

His son Charles Nancrede Proctor was captain of the 1927 Dartmouth ski team and the following year he competed in the 1928 Winter Olympics in Sankt Moritz, Switzerland. He became a proficient slalom skier, and with John Carleton was the first to climb and ski the headwall at Tuckerman’s Ravine in New Hampshire.

Proctor worked with the U.S. National Forest Service designing ski trails, and later coached the Harvard Ski Team. From 1938 he relocated to California as director of ski operations at Yosemite National Park. In 1936 Averell Harriman asked him to design many of the trails and lifts at Sun Valley in Idaho. He was elected to the U.S. Ski and Snowboard Hall of Fame in 1959.

== Books ==
- The Art of Skiing (with Rockwell R. Stephens), Harcourt, Brace & Co (1933)
- Skiing: Fundamentals, Equipment and Advanced Technique, Harcourt, Brace & Co (1936)
