= Integration (album) =

Studio album by Kellee Maize
- Released: November 11, 2011
- Recorded: 2011
- Genre: Hip hop/Rap
- Length: 70:35
- Label: Independent
- Producer: DJ Huggy

Kellee Maize chronology
Aligned Archetype (2010)	Integration (2011)	Owl Time (2012)

Integration is the third studio album by American rapper Kellee Maize. It was released on November 11, 2011, and was recorded primarily in her home studio, Nakturnal Studio. Musical styles present on the album include reggae, dubstep and electropop. The album's theme revolves around the idea of having a good balance between the opposites in human nature.

== Release and reception ==
The album received generally positive reviews, reaching the top on both Amazon and Frostwire. It was also downloaded over 160,000 times within its first month of release. The first single from the album, "Hasta Abajo," peaked at number 7 on Jamendo. Maize performed multiple tracks from the LP at the album's release party in Pittsburgh at a local Middle-Eastern inspired performance venue.

== Track listing ==
No.	Title	Writer(s)	Length
1.	"Healing Tones"	Kellee Maize	1:49
2.	"Mad Humans"	Maize	3:05
3.	"Hasta Abajo"	Maize	4:33
4.	"Takeover"	Maize	3:58
5.	"The Fact Is"	Maize	5:03
6.	"Trapped"	Maize	3:31
7.	"Don't Stop"	Maize	3:28
8.	"I Insist"	Maize	3:56
9.	"La La Love"	Maize	4:25
10.	"Catch Me"	Maize	3:44
11.	"Divine"	Maize	3:43
12.	"Shadows"	Maize	4:12
13.	"Notice the End"	Maize	4:40
14.	"Revival"	Maize	3:36
15.	"Eleven 11 (Remix)"	Maize	3:58
16.	"L'Outro"	Maize	3:36
17.	"Gratitude"	Maize	7:54
18.	"Buffalo Mediation"	Maize	1:44
