= The 5th Element (Kellee Maize album) =

Studio album by Kellee Maize
- Released: February 14, 2014
- Genre: Hip hop/rap
- Label: Independent
- Producer: Nice Nate, Headphone Activist, J.Glaze, Golden Day

Kellee Maize chronology
Owl Time (2010)	The 5th Element (2014)	The Remixes (2015)

The 5th Element is the sixth studio album by American rapper Kellee Maize. The album was distributed by Maize's marketing company Nakturnal and revolves around the theme of love.

== Production ==
The album was produced by Pittsburgh-based producers Nice Nate and Headphone Activist. It was mixed and mastered by producer J. Glaze.

== Track listing ==
No.	Title	Writer(s)	Length
1.	"Dancing With Lightning"	Kellee Maize	3:42
2.	"Anyway"	Maize	3:34
3.	"Gotta Love Me"	Maize	4:18
4.	"Indo Amnesia"	Maize	3:07
5.	"Vision"	Maize	2:57
6.	"Fast Track"	Maize	5:30
7.	"The 5th Element"	Maize	3:41
8.	"Today"	Maize	3:25
9.	"I Know You"	Maize	4:43
10.	"Rise"	Maize	5:30
11.	"Belong"	Maize	5:06
Total length:			45:33
