= Blinded by the Light (1980 film) =

1980 television film directed by John A. Alonzo

- Genre: Drama
- Based on: Blinded by the Light by Robin F. Brancato
- Written by: Stephen Black; Henry Stern; Robin Vote
- Directed by: John A. Alonzo
- Starring: Kristy McNichol; Jimmy McNichol; Grace Zabriskie; Jenny O'Hara
- Music by: Jonathan Tunick
- Country of origin: United States
- Original language: English

Production
- Executive producer: Philip Mandelker
- Producer: Rodrick Paul
- Cinematography: John A. Alonzo
- Editors: John C. Horger; Bernard J. Small
- Running time: 90 minutes
- Production company: Time-Life Television Productions

Original release
- Network: CBS
- Release: December 16, 1980

Blinded by the Light is a 1980 American made-for-television drama film directed by John A. Alonzo and starring Kristy and Jimmy McNichol. The film is based upon a Robin F. Brancato novel.

== Premise ==
David Bowers is a teenager who runs away from home to join a quasi-religious cult. His sister Janet is determined to find him, but almost winds up getting brainwashed by the cult herself.

== Cast ==
- Kristy McNichol as Janet Bowers
- Jimmy McNichol as David Bowers
- Anne Jackson as Frances Bowers
- Michael McGuire as Ed Bowers
- Jenny O'Hara as Rose
- Phillip R. Allen as Dr. Brockton
- Ben Bottoms as Scott
- Sandy McPeak as Max
- Keith Andes as Father Adam
- Gail Edwards as Zora
- Grace Zabriskie
