= Deuces Wild =

2002 film directed by Scott Kalvert

- Theatrical release poster
- Directed by: Scott Kalvert
- Written by: Paul Kimatian; Christopher Gambale
- Produced by: Michael Cerenzie; Willi Baer; Fred Caruso; Paul Kimatian
- Starring: Stephen Dorff; Brad Renfro; Fairuza Balk; Vincent Pastore; Frankie Muniz; Balthazar Getty; Matt Dillon; Norman Reedus
- Cinematography: John A. Alonzo
- Edited by: Michael R. Miller
- Music by: Stewart Copeland
- Production companies: United Artists; Unity Productions; Presto Productions
- Distributed by: MGM Distribution Co.
- Release date: May 3, 2002
- Running time: 98 minutes
- Country: United States
- Language: English
- Budget: $10 million
- Box office: $6.3 million

Deuces Wild is a 2002 American crime drama film directed by Scott Kalvert and written by Paul Kimatian and Christopher Gambale. The film stars Stephen Dorff, Brad Renfro, James Franco, Matt Dillon, and Fairuza Balk.

Martin Scorsese was originally the executive producer (as a favor to Kimatian), but he eventually removed his name from this film. It was the final film of cinematographer John A. Alonzo before his death in 2001.

== Plot ==
Leon and Bobby Anthony are brothers and members of the Deuces, a street gang who protect their neighborhood of Sunset Park, Brooklyn. Ever since the death of their youngest brother Alphonse "Allie Boy" from a heroin overdose at the hands of Marco, the leader of the Vipers, a neighboring rival street gang, they fiercely keep drugs off their turf. This puts them in strong opposition to the Vipers, who want to continue to sell drugs in the neighborhood. On the eve of Marco's return from a three-year stint in prison, a gang war seems imminent, as the Deuces violently retaliate with suspicion against Vipers muscleman and bookie Philly, who ekes out a vacant nightclub to establish business down the block. Marco, along with hoping to re-establish his drug-pushing enterprise, plans revenge against Leon, whom he believes ratted him out to the police for selling the killing "hot shot" to Alphonse.

Bobby falls for a new girl who moves in across the street, Annie, the uninvolved younger sister of Jimmy "Pockets", a Vipers member and heroin dealer, who takes care of their elderly dementia-ailing mother. Their attraction to each other complicates the gang rivalry, especially with Leon, who mistakenly fears and feels that Annie may be using Bobby. After jumping Deuces member Jackie in kind for the earlier attack, causing more gang fights in the neighborhood, Marco begins his activities again and allows the Vipers to rampage and terrorize residents across the block to establish his return for good. Later, Marco and the Vipers intimidate Bobby while on a date at the beach with Annie, before beating and raping Betsy (Leon's girlfriend) to push him over the edge.

After Leon runs a car through the Vipers' main hangout, neighborhood Mafioso Fritzy orders Leon and Marco to make amends; unopposed to Marco's drug dealing, knowing he can profit off of his racket and without appeal to Leon's cause to keep the neighborhood safe, Leon and Marco agree to a gang war, much to Fritzy's disappointment. Annie defends her mother from another one of Jimmy's outbursts with a kitchen knife and having enough of their troubled life in Brooklyn, wishes to run away with Bobby and her mother. As the Deuces and the Vipers meet at the docks for their confrontation, a battle ensues. Marco is killed by Leon in a duel, being saved by tag-along kid Scooch, while Jimmy Pockets is shot and killed by Philly, who accuses him of stealing the gang's stash of money. Leon is shot and killed by one of Fritzy's men in retaliation for ignoring his orders.

At Leon's funeral, Bobby and the gang, along with his and Annie's mother, pay their last respects to Leon. In a small epilogue, Bobby explains that his mother will go to live with their uncle in Long Island, he and Annie are free to take her mother to Los Angeles to start anew, gives Scooch and Father Aldo of the nearby Catholic church part of the stolen stash of money to invest, and that after the funeral, this would be the last time he would see the Deuces again, as gangs throughout Brooklyn would eventually disappear. Before leaving, Bobby drops a wheelbarrow full of cinder blocks on Fritzy's car, presumably killing him, to uphold Leon's word that "there would be no more junk on the streets".

== Cast ==
- Stephen Dorff as Leon Anthony, the eldest Anthony Brother and leader of the Deuces
- Brad Renfro as Bobby Anthony, the middle child of the Anthony boys
- Fairuza Balk as Annie "The Ice Cube", Jimmy Pockets' sister who catches Bobby's eyes
- Vincent Pastore as Father Aldo, Priest of the local Catholic church
- Frankie Muniz as "Scooch", a youngster who wanted to join the Deuces
- Balthazar Getty as Jimmy "Pockets", a Viper drug dealer who was secretly a snitch
- Matt Dillon as "Fritzy", a mobster and drug dealer who practically ran the streets
- Norman Reedus as Marco Vendetti, leader of the Vipers
- Max Perlich as Freddie
- Drea de Matteo as Betsy, Leon's girlfriend and Marco's ex
- Louis Lombardi as Philly "Babe", the muscle and bookkeeper of the Vipers
- Deborah Harry as Wendy
- James Franco as Tino Verona, a foot soldier for the Deuces
- Josh Leonard as "Punchy"
- Johnny Knoxville as Vinnie "Fish", a foot soldier for the Vipers
- George Georgiadis as Willie
- Jackie Tohn as Mary Ann

== Production ==
The film was shot in Los Angeles, California and New York City, New York during 2000. Originally the film would be released in September 2001, but due to the September 11 attacks, it was pushed back to 2002.

== Reception ==
The film received negative reviews. A scathing write-up of the film was written by Stephen Holden of The New York Times, who wrote:

Deuces Wild is a film that desperately wants to be a music video circa 1983. All that's missing from its absurdly stagy scenes of gang warfare on the streets of Brooklyn in 1958 is the pounding screech of Michael Jackson's Beat It. The music we get instead is a tepid rock score by Stewart Copeland spiced with mostly obscure grade-B oldies-but-goodies.

This is a movie so insecure about its capacity to excite that it churns up not one but two flagrantly fake thunderstorms to underscore the action. Its loony excesses are exemplified by the casting of poor Deborah Harry as a gang member's dazed mother who has retreated into a fantasy world where it's always Christmas. As she wobbles around her dingy, tree-decorated apartment mumbling Jingle Bells in the middle of summer, the scene seems like a Saturday Night Live spoof of kitchen-sink realism.

Matters are not helped by the appearances of two prominent cast members of The Sopranos. Here, Vincent Pastore, whose Sopranos character Big Pussy went to sleep with the fishes a while ago, is Father Aldo, a kindly but ineffectual priest whose peacemaking efforts on the mean streets of Sunset Park come to naught. Drea DeMatteo (Adriana on The Sopranos) has altered her hair color (to brilliant blond) but not her alley-cat body language for the role of Betsy, the girlfriend of Leon (Stephen Dorff), leader of the gang known as the Deuces. In both instances, the overlay of associations from the television series to the film produces an uneasy double vision.

Robert Koehler of Variety wrote that "in its overwhelmingly artificial depiction of the street gangs that ruled Brooklyn’s mean streets in the 1950s, 'Deuces Wild' draws from a phony deck. The most antiquated aspects of 'West Side Story'—minus the music and the Puerto Rican-Anglo conflict—are seen here, from the faux street-tough attitude of several attractive but dull Hollywood hunks to the unmistakable backstage look of the entire project. This is a movie that can’t say no to a melodramatic opportunity, and whatever verisimilitude inspired Paul Kimatian and Christopher Gambale to write a script based on Kimatian’s memories of the gangs has been utterly lost along the way. UA’s much-delayed pic, first set for spring 2001 release, will deal and fold with hardly a trace." Glenn Whipp of the Los Angeles Daily News said that "director Scott Kalvert shoots the fight scenes as if he were staging a literal head-bangers ball, with lots of loud music, fog machines, thunder and lightning. The only thing missing in all of the choppy slow-motion shots and quick edits is a sense of competence, which would at least have kept "Deuces" from plumbing the depths of unintentional comedy." Mick LaSalle of the San Francisco Chronicle wrote:

A movie this bad doesn't need criticism; it needs an autopsy. We could talk about the ridiculous story, the '50s-movie cliches and some acting that's amazing in the worst way. We could even indulge in a little 20-20 hindsight and talk about the dubious wisdom of making a gangland movie set in 1958, about a bunch of neighborhood guys wearing cuffed jeans and white T-shirts. They have no guns in those leather jackets, so how tense are we supposed to get when they all start punching each other?

But look, bad movies happen all the time. The thing that's interesting about "Deuces Wild" is how soon we know. After all, when the lights go down there's always hope. Even with the Britney Spears movie, there's hope. Then usually comes the tip-off, the uh-oh moment, and we catch on. The rest of the movie is like getting the election returns after the exit polls are in.

In "Deuces Wild" the uh-oh moment comes a few minutes in, as the scene is being set. It's subtle: Matt Dillon is introduced as the mafia king of the neighborhood. He sits in his red luxury car, waves a kid over to the window and hands him two or three dollars. "Here, kid. Buy yourself some ice cream." In 1958? Fifty cents would be more like it, maybe even a quarter. Two or three dollars in 1958 would have had that kid dancing in the streets.

That may be a minor thing, but it indicates that director Scott Kalvert and his crew were not really thinking about 1958 when they made the movie. They weren't paying attention to details. The result of carelessness is a sloppy movie, and that's what "Deuces Wild" is. It's sloppy not only in its evocation of the era but also in its writing, acting and storytelling.

Just one example. Here's a movie set 45 years ago, in which people talk about giving each other "space." In 1958, the only time people talked about space is when they referred to Sputnik.

[...]

This movie was better when it was called "West Side Story. " It was pretty good as "Romeo and Juliet," too.

As Bobby, Brad Renfro does his best to act like a dumb guy, with a clouded look in his eyes and his mouth set in a kind of "duh" expression. He's not good at it. Then again, maybe he's lucky.

Marjorie Baumgarten of The Austin Chronicle said the following about the film:

Like most of the rest of the participants in American culture, I get a thrill from the sight of a phalanx of Fifties rebel boys dressed in tight white T-shirts and worn-just-right dungarees. Whether prepped for a gang fight, marking their turf, or kicking their legs in the air with the flash of a West Side Story switchblade, these cadres of midcentury boys-into-men borough teens are a staple of American iconography. In these times, especially, they represent a kinder, gentler gangbanger of yore -- ducktailed rebels without causes, defenders of ethnic divisions and the sanctity of womanhood instead of the soulless late-century drive-by shooters and lethal errand boys of South American drug kingpins. That said, the new Fifties gang picture Deuces Wild gets the look and the period trappings right, but it otherwise drowns in a sea of visual and verbal clichés. These clichés may not be more abundant than in other movies of the genre, it's just that they seem more noticeable in Deuces Wild because there is little else here propping them up. The storyline is minimal, the action sequences are poorly staged, and the characters and performances are all blandly interchangeable. Likely to receive some initial notice due to the film's bevy of talent, viewers will be hard pressed to distinguish one gangbanger from another. [...] The women all have thankless accessory roles, especially Harry, who gets to play a mentally unbalanced mom. The script by Paul Kimatian and Christopher Gambale is a flatline pastiche of familiar dialogue and plot points. Reportedly, these writers were not collaborators: Former Scorsese still photographer Kimatian turned in a script that was later revamped by Gambale. Though no matter how it was achieved, there is no excuse for lines such as this: “Of course there is a Santa Claus. He just doesn't come to Brooklyn.” Director Kalvert, whose only other feature film is the period NYC gutter story Basketball Diaries, is unable to salvage anything out of this pile-up, and, in fact, adds his own inadequacies in shooting the action sequences to the mess. Esteemed cinematographer John Alonzo (Chinatown, Scarface) is also on hand but unable to redeem anything from these filmed-in-L.A. New York City streets. Deuces Wild would have been smart to fold before it let its hand go this far.

On the review aggregator website Rotten Tomatoes, 3% of 74 critics' reviews are positive, with an average rating of 3.2/10. The website's consensus reads: "Melodramatic and weighed down with silly dialogue, Deuces Wild is a forgettable, overheated thriller that leaves no cliche unturned." Metacritic, which uses a weighted average, assigned the film a score of 16 out of 100, based on 21 critics, indicating "overwhelming dislike". Audiences polled by CinemaScore gave the film an average grade of "C" on an A+ to F scale.

=== Box office ===
Opening against a record-breaking $114 million opening weekend of Spider-Man on May 3, 2002, the film underperformed, grossing $2,7040,682 in its opening weekend from 1,480 theaters in the United States and Canada and debuting at number 7 at the box office. Deuces Wild eventually grossed $6,080,065 in the United States and Canada and $202,381 internationally for a worldwide total of $6,282,446.

=== Accolades ===
Award	Category	Nominee(s)	Result
American Choreography Awards	Outstanding Achievement in Fight Choreography	Todd Bryant, Pete Antico	Nominated
Stinkers Bad Movie Awards	Worst Supporting Actress	Debbie Harry	Nominated

== Home media ==
The film was released on DVD on August 6, 2002, and also on Blu-Ray on September 22, 2015.
