= Age of Feminine =

Studio album by Kellee Maize
- Released: June 29, 2007
- Recorded: 2007
- Genre: Hip Hop/Rap
- Length: 35:48
- Label: Independent
- Producer: DJ Huggy

Kellee Maize chronology
Age of Feminine (2007)	Aligned Archetype (2010)

Age of Feminine is the first album released by American rapper, Kellee Maize. It was recorded and released independently. The leading sound engineer was DJ Huggy, who was involved with the mixing and recording of each track for the album. To date, it has been downloaded over one hundred times.

== Track listing ==
No.	Title	Writer(s)	Length
1.	"Winding Road"	Kellee Maize	2:26
2.	"Age of Feminine"	Maize	4:25
3.	"Story of Me"	Maize	4:54
4.	"Raja"	Maize	2:59
5.	"Yesterday"	Maize	3:23
6.	"Struggle"	Maize	4:12
7.	"Please Remember"	Maize	1:06
8.	"Hawk"	Maize	5:59
9.	"Internal Trouble"	Maize	0:48
10.	"Marchin"	Maize	4:34
11.	"412"	Maize	1:08
