= Larry Hagman =

American actor (1931–2012)

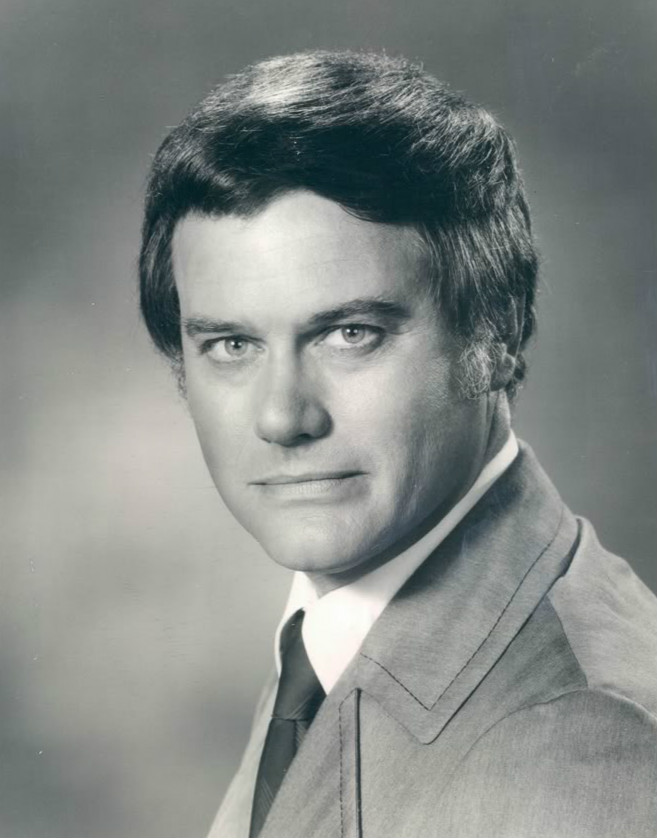
- Hagman in 1973
- Born: Larry Martin Hagman; September 21, 1931; Fort Worth, Texas, U.S.
- Died: November 23, 2012 (aged 81); Dallas, Texas, U.S.
- Education: Bard College (withdrawn)
- Occupations: Actor; director; producer
- Years active: 1950–2012
- Known for: I Dream of Jeannie (1965–1970); Dallas (1978–1991); Dallas (2012–2013)
- Political party: Democratic; Peace and Freedom
- Spouse: Maj Axelsson (m. 1954)
- Children: 2
- Mother: Mary Martin
- Military career
- Allegiance: United States
- Branch: United States Air Force
- Service years: 1952–1956
- Rank: Airman 1st Class
- Unit: Allied Forces Central Europe (AFCENT)
- Website: larryhagman.com

Larry Martin Hagman (September 21, 1931 – November 23, 2012) was an American actor, best known for playing ruthless oil baron J. R. Ewing in the 1978–1991 primetime television soap opera Dallas, and the astronaut Major Anthony Nelson in the 1965–1970 sitcom I Dream of Jeannie. Hagman had supporting roles in numerous films, including Fail-Safe, Harry and Tonto, S.O.B., Nixon, and Primary Colors. His television appearances also included guest roles on dozens of shows spanning from the late 1950s until his death, and a reprise of his signature role on the 2012 revival of Dallas. Hagman also worked as a television producer and director. He was the son of actress Mary Martin. Hagman underwent a life-saving liver transplant in 1995. He died in 2012 from complications of acute myeloid leukemia.

== Early life ==
Larry Martin Hagman was born on September 21, 1931, in Fort Worth, Texas. His mother, Mary Martin, became a Broadway actress and musical comedy star after his birth. His father, Benjamin Jackson Hagman, who was of Swedish descent, was an accountant and lawyer who worked as a district attorney. Hagman's parents divorced in 1936 when he was five years old. He lived with his maternal grandmother, Juanita Presley Martin, in Texas and California, while his mother became a contract player with Paramount in 1938. In 1940, Hagman's mother met and married Richard Halliday before giving birth to a daughter, Heller, the following year. Hagman attended a strict academy, Black-Foxe Military Institute, and briefly Woodstock Country School, a boarding school in Vermont.

When his mother moved to New York City to resume her Broadway career, Hagman again lived with his grandmother in California. A few years later, his grandmother died, so Hagman joined his mother in New York City. In 1946, Hagman moved back to his hometown of Weatherford, and attended Weatherford High School, from which he graduated. One summer, he worked for oilfield-equipment maker Antelope Tool Company. Although his father wanted Hagman to become a lawyer and join his practice, he was drawn to drama classes and reportedly fell in love with the stage. He graduated from high school in 1949, and decided to pursue acting. He attended Bard College, New York, majoring in dance and drama, but dropped out after one year.

== Career ==
Hagman began his career in 1950 acting in productions at Margaret Webster's school at the Woodstock Playhouse in Woodstock, New York. That summer, during a break from his one year at Bard College, he worked in Dallas as a production assistant and acting in small roles in Margo Jones's theater company. He appeared in The Taming of the Shrew in New York City, followed by numerous tent show musicals with St. John Terrell's Music Circus in St. Petersburg, Florida and Lambertville, New Jersey. In 1951, Hagman appeared in the London production of South Pacific with his mother and stayed in the show for nearly a year. In 1952, Hagman received his draft notice and enlisted in the United States Air Force.

Stationed in London, he spent the majority of his military service entertaining U.S. troops in the United Kingdom and at bases in Europe. After leaving the Air Force in 1956, Hagman returned to New York City, where he appeared in the off-Broadway play Once Around the Block, by William Saroyan. That was followed by nearly a year in another off-Broadway play, James Lee's Career. His Broadway debut occurred in 1958 in Comes a Day. Hagman appeared in four other Broadway plays, God and Kate Murphy, The Nervous Set, The Warm Peninsula and The Beauty Part. During this period, he also appeared in numerous, mostly live, television programs.

Hagman's first television role was as Kenneth Davidson in the 1957 episode "Saturday Lost" of the syndicated crime drama, Decoy, starring Beverly Garland as the first female police officer in a television lead. In 1958, he joined Barbara Bain as a guest star in the short-lived adventure-drama series Harbourmaster and appeared three times on Lloyd Bridges' syndicated adventure series, Sea Hunt. In 1960, he was cast in the CBS summer medical series Diagnosis: Unknown in the role of Don Harding in the episode, "The Case of the Radiant Wine". In 1961, Hagman joined the cast of daytime soap opera The Edge of Night as Ed Gibson and stayed in that role for two years. In 1963 and 1964, he appeared twice in segments of the CBS legal drama, The Defenders

In 1964, he made his film debut in Ensign Pulver, the sequel to 1955's Mister Roberts. That same year, he also appeared in the Cold War thriller Fail Safe.

== I Dream of Jeannie ==
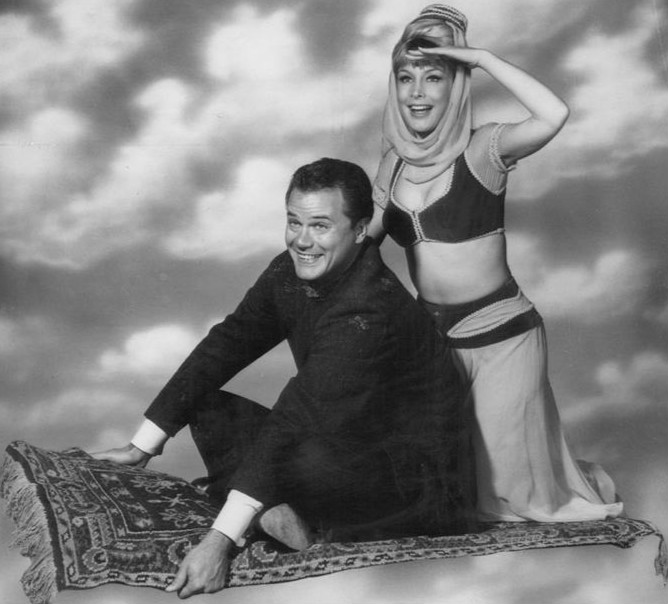
Hagman and Barbara Eden on I Dream of Jeannie (1965)

In 1965, Hagman was cast as "genie" Barbara Eden's master and eventual love interest, Air Force Captain (later Major) Anthony Nelson, in the NBC situation comedy I Dream of Jeannie, which ran for five seasons from 1965 to 1970. The show entered the top 30 in its first year and was NBC's answer to the successful 1960s magical comedies, Bewitched on ABC and My Favorite Martian on CBS. Two reunion movies were later made, both televised on NBC: I Dream of Jeannie... Fifteen Years Later (1985) and I Still Dream of Jeannie (1991), but Hagman did not appear in either of them. At Dragon Con, in 2010, Hagman said he was never approached about it.

In 1999, after 29 years, Hagman agreed to reunite with Jeannie co-stars Barbara Eden and Bill Daily and creator/producer Sidney Sheldon on The Donny and Marie Show. In 2002, when I Dream of Jeannie was set to join the cable channel TV Land, Hagman once again took part in a reunion with Eden and Daily, this time on Larry King Live. On the TV Land Awards in March 2004, Hagman and Eden were the first presenters to reunite on stage. The following October, Hagman and Daily appeared at the Ray Courts Hollywood Autograph Show. And the following year, 2005, brought all three surviving stars from I Dream of Jeannie to the first cast reunion at the Chiller Expo Show.

Hagman and Eden reunited in March 2006 for a publicity tour in New York City to promote the first-season DVD of I Dream of Jeannie. He reunited once again with Eden on stage in the play Love Letters at the College of Staten Island in New York and the United States Military Academy, West Point, New York. The appearance marked the first time the two performers had acted together since Eden appeared with Hagman in a five-episode arc on Dallas in 1990.

== Dallas ==
In 1978, Hagman was offered two roles on two television series that were debuting. One was for The Waverly Wonders and the other for Dallas, in the role of conniving elder son and businessman J.R. Ewing. When Hagman read the Dallas script at his wife's suggestion, they both concluded it was perfect for him. Hagman based his portrayal in part on Jess Hall Jr., the owner of Antelope Tool and Supply Company, where Hagman had worked as a young man.

Dallas became a worldwide success, airing in 90 countries, most notably the United Kingdom, where it was even enjoyed by members of that country's royal family, and led to several successful primetime spin-offs. Hagman became one of the best-known television stars of the era. Producers were keen to capitalize on that love/hate family relationship of J.R., building anticipation to a fever pitch in "A House Divided", the 1980 cliffhanger season finale in which J.R. is shot by an unknown assailant, leading to the world-wide "Who shot J.R.?" phenomenon.

At the beginning of the fourth season later that year, audience and actors were trying to guess "Who shot J.R.?", now one of fictional TV's most famous questions. During the media buildup, Hagman was involved in contract negotiations, delaying his return in the fourth season. Hagman held out for a higher salary. Producers were faced with a dilemma of whether to pay the greatly increased salary or to write J.R. out of the program. Lorimar Productions, the makers of the series, began shooting different scenes of Dallas that did not include Hagman. In the midst of negotiations, Hagman took his family to London for their July vacation. He continued to fight for his demands and network executives conceded that they wanted J.R. to remain on Dallas. Hagman did not appear in the first episode of the new season until the final few minutes. From then on, Hagman became one of the highest-paid stars in television. At the beginning of the 1980–81 season, writers were told to keep the storylines away from the actors until they really found out who actually shot J.R. and three weeks passed until the culprit was revealed on November 21, 1980, in a ratings record-breaking episode.

For his performance as J.R. Ewing, Hagman was nominated for two Emmy Awards for Outstanding Lead Actor in a Drama Series in 1980 and 1981, but did not win. He was also nominated for four Golden Globe Awards, between 1981 and 1985. He was nominated for a Soap Opera Digest award seven times for Outstanding Villain on a Prime Time Serial, Outstanding Actor in a Leading Role on a Prime Time Serial, Favorite Super Couple: Prime Time and Outstanding Actor in a Comic Relief Role on a Prime Time Serial and won five times. Hagman received the Golden Plate Award of the American Academy of Achievement from Academy member Ray Lee Hunt at the 1981 Achievement Summit in Dallas. In 1984, co-star Barbara Bel Geddes left Dallas, following a contract dispute that had resulted from her March 1983 quadruple heart bypass surgery. At one point, Hagman suggested to his real-life mother Mary Martin that she play Miss Ellie, but she rejected the suggestion and Bel Geddes was briefly replaced by Donna Reed for the 1984–1985 season, before Bel Geddes returned in better health for the 1985–1986 season. By the end of its 14th season in 1991, ratings had slipped to the extent that CBS decided to end Dallas. Hagman was the only actor to appear in all 357 episodes. He had also made five guest appearances on the Dallas spin-off series Knots Landing in the early 1980s. Some years after Dallas ended, Hagman appeared in two subsequent Dallas television movies: J.R. Returns in 1996 and War of the Ewings in 1998.

Hagman reprised his role as J.R. Ewing in TNT's continuation of Dallas, which began in 2012. In 2011, while filming the new series, Hagman said, "Of course it's fun to play the villain." As a result of Hagman's death in 2012, his character J.R. was killed off in season two of Dallas. Unused footage of Hagman was used in season three as part of that season's story arc, which aired in 2014.

== Other work ==
=== Television ===
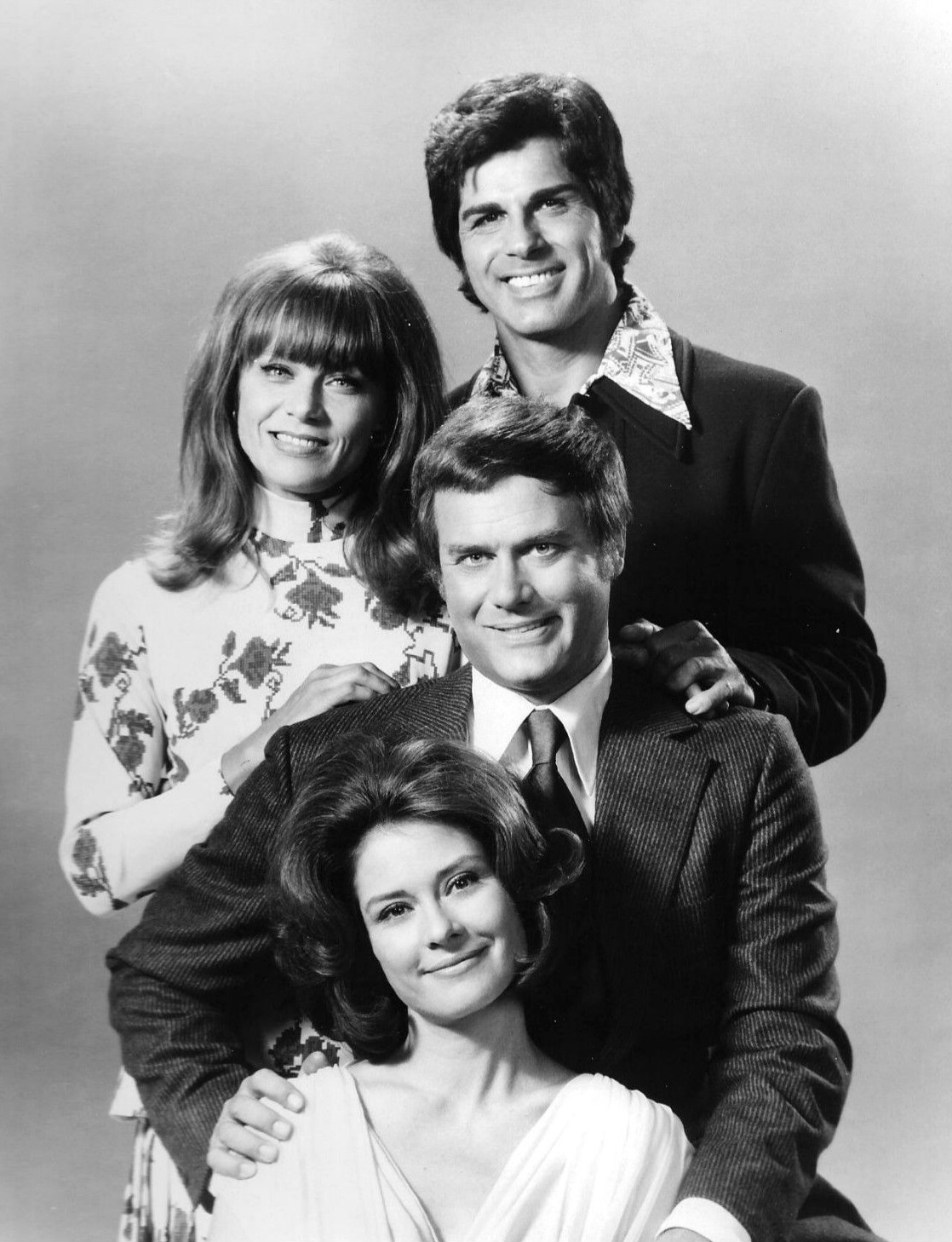
TV series Here We Go Again (1973): From top: Dick Gautier, Nita Talbot, Hagman and Diane Baker

Hagman starred in two short-lived series in the 1970s, The Good Life (1971–1972) and Here We Go Again (1973). In 1993, Hagman starred in Staying Afloat as a down-on-his-luck former millionaire who agrees to work undercover with the FBI to maintain his playboy lifestyle. Originally ordered for two TV movies and a weekly series by NBC, the pilot movie aired in November 1993 to critical drubbing and low ratings, ending production.

In January 1997, Hagman starred in a short-lived television series titled Orleans as Judge Luther Charbonnet, which lasted only eight episodes. In 2002, he made an appearance in the fourth series of Vic Reeves and Bob Mortimer's British comedy panel game, Shooting Stars, often appearing bewildered at the nonsensical questions and the antics of the hosts – during the show Hagman even stated that he would fire his agent as a result. In January 2011, Hagman made a guest appearance in the seventh season of Desperate Housewives as a new husband for Lynette Scavo's mother, Stella (played by Polly Bergen).

=== Film ===
Hagman appeared in such feature films as The Group; Fail-Safe; Harry and Tonto; Mother, Jugs & Speed; In Harm's Way; The Eagle Has Landed; Superman; S.O.B.; Nixon; and Primary Colors. His television work included Getting Away from It All, Sidekicks, The Return of the World's Greatest Detective, Intimate Strangers, Checkered Flag or Crash and A Howling in the Woods

Hagman directed (and appeared briefly in) the 1972 comedy horror film Beware! The Blob, also called Son of Blob, a sequel to the 1958 horror film The Blob. It was the only feature film he directed.

=== Music ===
The release of a Columbia single performed with his mother Mary Martin, Get Out Those Old Records, in 1950, was credited to Mary Martin and her Son Larry, with orchestration by Mitch Miller. It was released in Australia as a-78 rpm single, catalogue number DO-3409.

In 1980, Hagman recorded a single called "Ballad of the Good Luck Charm".

=== Product spokesman ===
During the 1980s, Hagman was featured in a national televised Schlitz beer campaign, playing on, but not explicitly featuring, the J.R. character. He wore the same kind of Western business outfit – complete with cowboy hat – that he wore in his role. The end of each 30-second spot featured a male voice-over saying, "Refreshing Schlitz beer...the gusto's back..." Hagman, grinning into the camera, added: "...and I'm gonna get it!" He also made commercials for BVD brand underwear.

In 2010, Hagman was hired as a spokesman for SolarWorld, a German solar energy commercial enterprise. While the SolarWorld commercials specifically mention neither Dallas nor J. R. Ewing, Hagman essentially revisits the character (complete with a picture of Hagman as J. R. Ewing from the original series on the mantle), stating that his oil company days are long over, "though still in the energy business", meaning solar energy, instead, which alternative energy now plays a major part of the next-generation Ewing family war between Christopher and John Ross III.

== Personal life ==
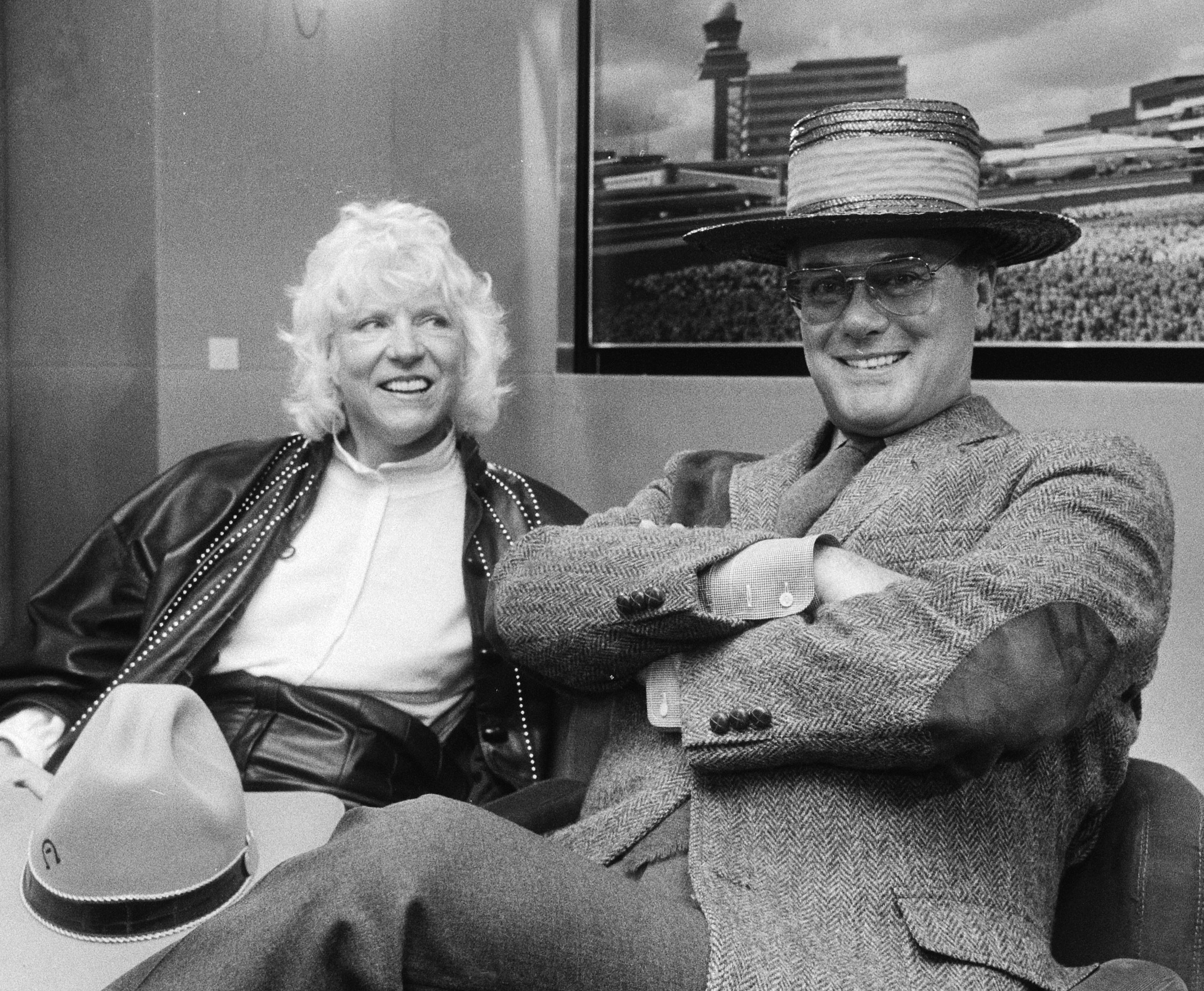
Hagman with Maj Axelsson in 1983

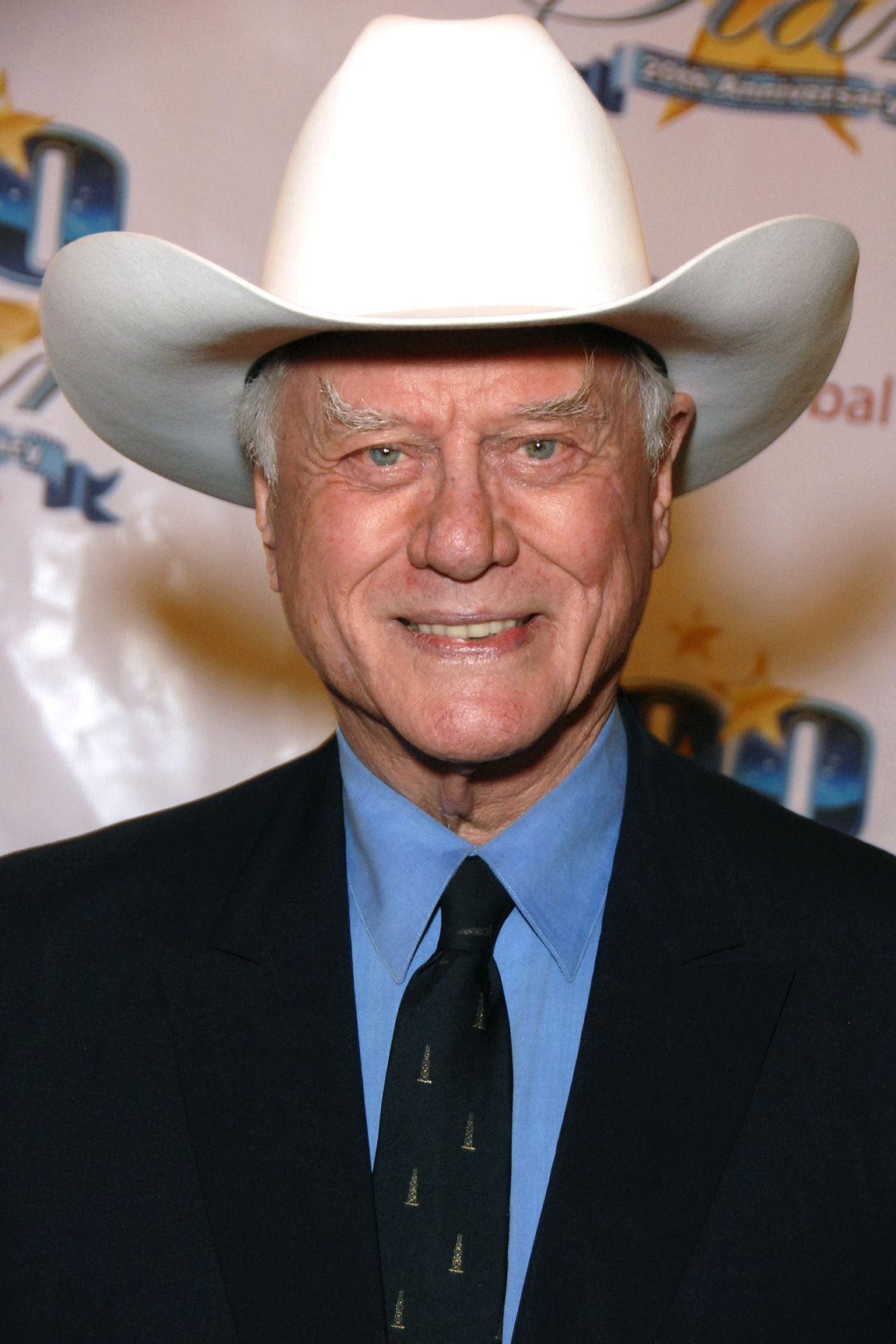
Hagman in 2010

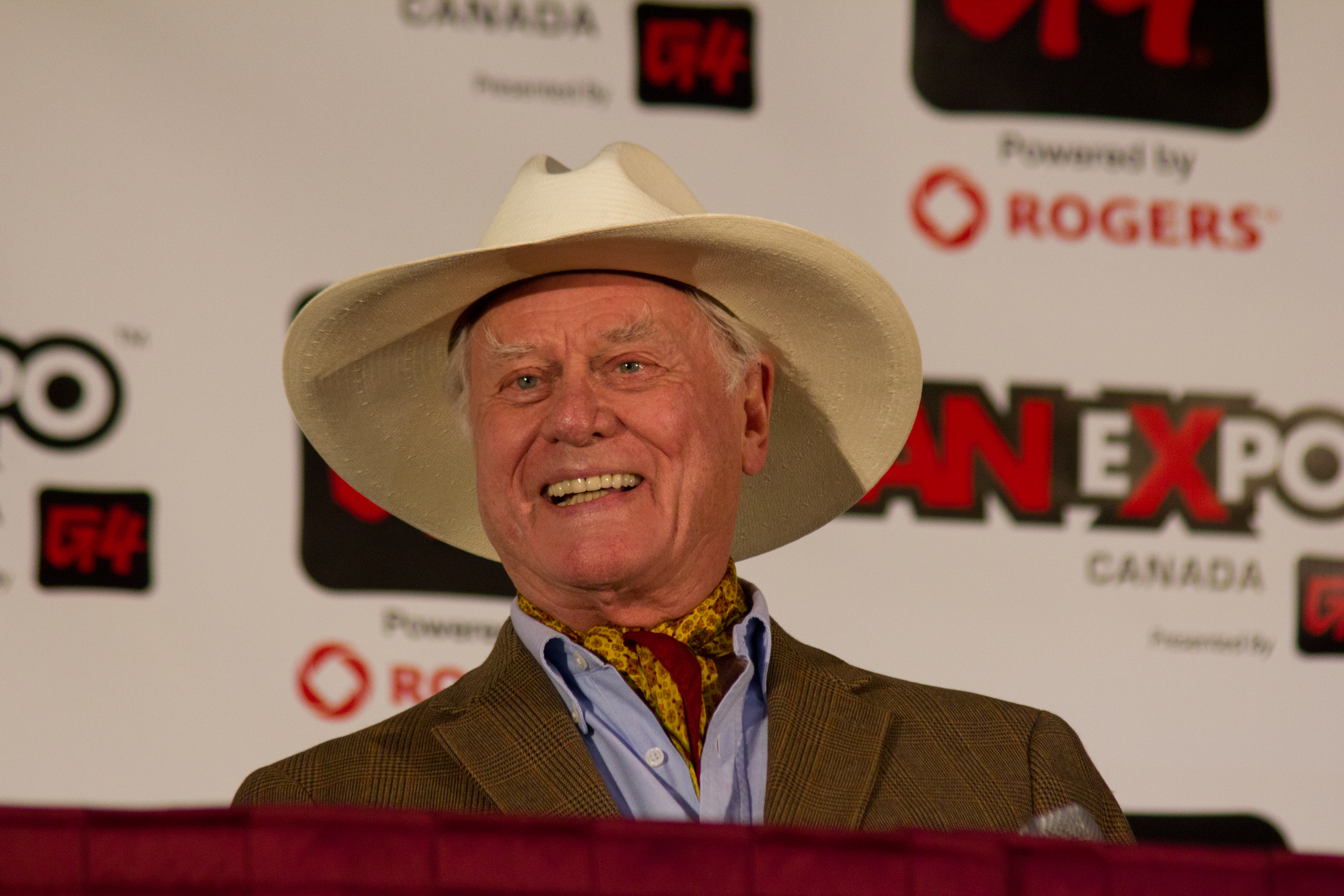
Hagman in August 2011

In 1973, his stepfather Richard Halliday died and Hagman reconciled with his mother, Mary Martin, soon after. The two were close until her death from colon cancer in 1990.

In 1954, Hagman married Swedish-born Maj Axelsson (born May 13, 1928, in Eskilstuna, Södermanlands län, Sweden – died May 31, 2016, in Los Angeles, California); they had two children, Heidi Kristina (born 1958) and Preston (born 1962). Longtime residents of Malibu, California, they then moved to Ojai. Hagman was a member of the Peace and Freedom Party from the 1960s. Hagman derided U.S. President George W. Bush prior to the Iraq War.

In 1969, Hagman's friend, musician David Crosby, supplied him with LSD after a concert: "LSD was such a profound experience in my life that it changed my pattern of life and my way of thinking and I could not exclude it [from my autobiography]." Hagman was introduced to marijuana by Jack Nicholson as a safer alternative to Hagman's heavy drinking. "I liked it because it was fun, it made me feel good and I never had a hangover." Although Hagman was a member of a 12-step program, he publicly advocated marijuana as a better alternative to alcohol.

In 1995, Hagman underwent a life-saving liver transplant after he was diagnosed with liver cancer, which was most likely brought on by roughly 40 years of heavy drinking. His clinical picture was further complicated by cirrhosis of the liver, which had been diagnosed three years earlier in 1992. Hagman did not receive preferential treatment as a celebrity, with a 1995 UPI article stating that the donor liver "matched Hagman's anonymous physical profile listed with the United Network for Organ Sharing."

He was also a heavy smoker as a young man before quitting at age 34. He was the chairman of the American Cancer Society's annual Great American Smokeout for many years and also worked on behalf of the National Kidney Foundation.

After attending a soccer game in Bucharest between Steaua Bucharest and West Ham United, he became a well-known fan of the Romanian team.

In 2001, Hagman wrote his autobiography titled Hello Darlin': Tall (and Absolutely True) Tales About My Life. In a 2007 interview, Hagman discussed his support for alternative energy. On a 2008 episode of Living with Ed, Hagman and his wife showed actor Ed Begley Jr. their solar-powered, super-energy efficient home named "Heaven" and talked about their green lifestyle. Maj Hagman was diagnosed with Alzheimer's disease in 2008 and Hagman at first took the lead in caring for her, but her condition deteriorated. By 2010, she required 24-hour nursing care. As a result, Hagman put their 43 acres (17 ha) estate in Ojai up for sale listing it at $11 million.

== Friendship with Carroll O'Connor ==
Hagman had a long friendship with actor Carroll O'Connor, beginning in 1959 when Hagman was starring in the Broadway play God and Kate Murphy and O'Connor was working as an assistant stage manager. Later, as the two struggled as young actors, they rented apartments near each other in New York. Hagman's daughter Heidi, whom O'Connor had known since her childhood, joined the cast for one season of Archie Bunker's Place. Hagman directed several episodes of O'Connor's later series In the Heat of the Night.

== Illness and death ==
In June 2011, Hagman said he had stage 2 throat cancer. He commented, "As J. R. I could get away with anything — bribery, blackmail and adultery, but I got caught by cancer. I do want everyone to know that it is a very common and treatable form of cancer. I will be receiving treatment while working on the new Dallas series. I could not think of a better place to be than working on a show I love, with people I love." Hagman had an acorn-sized tumor removed from his tongue in 2011. In June 2012, the cancer was said to be in remission. Then, in July 2012, doctors diagnosed Hagman with myelodysplastic syndrome (formerly known as preleukemia).

Hagman died on November 23, 2012, at Medical City Dallas Hospital in Dallas following complications from acute myeloid leukemia, after being interviewed for the National Geographic documentary The '80s: The Decade that Made Us, which aired in April 2013. In a statement to the Dallas Morning News, Hagman's family said: "Larry's family and close friends had joined him in Dallas for the Thanksgiving holiday. He died surrounded by loved ones. It was a peaceful passing, just as he had wished for." The New York Times described him as "one of television's most beloved villains".

== Tributes ==
Actress Barbara Eden, a longtime friend of Hagman's, who played Jeannie on I Dream of Jeannie and Lee Ann de la Vega on Dallas, said: "Larry was one of the most intelligent actors I ever worked with. He more than hit his marks. And when you're working with another actor, you know immediately if the ball isn't tossed back. Plus, Larry was savvy about the business, which I wasn't." In an interview with Australia's News 10, she commented that their on-screen chemistry on the set of Jeannie "was not work" and "our timing was right. I can't even explain it. It was wonderful."

Actress Linda Gray, who played Sue Ellen Ewing on Dallas, called Hagman her "best friend for 35 years" and was at his bedside when he died, her agent told the BBC. In a statement, she said: "He was the Pied Piper of life and brought joy to everyone he knew. He was creative, generous, funny, loving and talented and I will miss him enormously. He was an original and lived life to the fullest."

Actor Patrick Duffy, who played Bobby Ewing on Dallas, was also at his bedside when he died. In a statement, he said: "Friday, I lost one of the greatest friends ever to grace my life. The loneliness is only what is difficult, as Larry's peace and comfort is always what is important to me, now as when he was here. He was a fighter in the gentlest way, against his obstacles and for his friends. I wear his friendship with honor."

== Filmography ==
=== Features ===
Year	Title	Role	Notes
1964	The Cavern	Capt. Wilson	
1964	Ensign Pulver	Billings	
1964	Fail Safe	Buck	
1965	In Harm's Way	Lieutenant Cline	
1966	The Group	Harald Peterson	
1970	Up in the Cellar	Maurice Camber	
1972	Beware! The Blob	Young Hobo	Directorial debut
1973	The Toy Game	Major	
1973	Antonio	Mark Hunter	
1974	Harry and Tonto	Eddie	
1974	Stardust	Porter Lee Austin	
1976	Mother, Jugs & Speed	Murdoch	
1976	The Big Bus	Parking Lot Doctor	
1976	The Eagle Has Landed	Col. Clarence E. Pitts	
1977	Checkered Flag or Crash	Bo Cochran	
1978	Superman	Major	
1981	S.O.B.	Dick Benson	
1981	I Am Blushing	Larry Hagman	
1986	The Richest Cat in the World	Leo Kohlmeyer	Voice, uncredited
1995	Nixon	Jack Jones	
1998	Primary Colors	Gov. Fred Picker	
2008	Fuel	Himself	
2011	The Flight of the Swan	Corporate President	Last film role

=== Television films ===
Year	Title	Role	Notes
1958	The Outcasts of Poker Flat		
1963	The Silver Burro		
1969	Three's a Crowd	Jim Carson	
1971	Vanished	Jerry Freytag	
1971	The Hired Hand	Sheriff	Uncredited
1971	A Howling in the Woods	Eddie Crocker	
1972	Getting Away from It All	Fred Clark	
1972	No Place to Run	Jay Fox	
1973	What Are Best Friends For?	Frank Ross	
1974	Hurricane	Paul Damon	
1974	Sidekicks	Quince Drew	
1975	Sarah T. – Portrait of a Teenage Alcoholic	Jerry Travis	
1975	The Big Rip-Off	Frank Darnell	
1976	The Return of the World's Greatest Detective	Sherman Holmes	
1977	Intimate Strangers	Mort Burns	
1978	The President's Mistress	Ed Murphy	
1978	Last of the Good Guys	Sergeant Frank O'Malley	
1978	A Double Life	Doyle Rettig	
1982	Deadly Encounter	Sam	
1986	Dallas: The Early Years	J.R. Ewing	
1993	Staying Afloat	Alexander Hollingsworth III	
1996	Dallas: J.R. Returns	J.R. Ewing	
1997	The Third Twin	Berrington Jones	
1998	Dallas: War of the Ewings	J.R. Ewing	

=== Television ===
Year	Title	Role	Notes
1956	The West Point Story		Miscredited
1957	Search for Tomorrow	Curt Williams	
1957	Decoy	Kenneth Davidson	
1958	Sea Hunt	Alex Kouras/Elliot Conway/Johnny Greco	3 episodes
1960	The Play of the Week	Officer Joe Smith	Episode: "Once Around the Block"
1961	The Edge of Night	Ed Gibson	7 episodes
1964	The Rogues		
1965–1970	I Dream of Jeannie	Major Anthony Nelson / Various characters	139 episodes
1970	Love American Style	1 episode	
1970	Night Gallery	Cedric Acton	Episode: "The Housekeeper"
1971	The Good Life	Albert Miller	
1973	Applause	Bill Sampson	
1973	Here We Go Again	Richard Evans	
1973	The Alpha Caper	Tudor	
1973	Blood Sport	Coach Marshall	
1974	Police Woman	Tony Bonner	
1975	Ellery Queen	Paul Gardner	Episode: "The Adventure of the Mad Tea Party"
1975	The Streets of San Francisco	Terry Wine (radio host)	Episode: "Dead Air"
1977	The Rhinemann Exchange	Col. Edmund Pace	
1977	The Rockford Files	Richard Lessing	
1978–1991	Dallas	J.R. Ewing	356 episodes
1980–1982	Knots Landing	J.R. Ewing	5 episodes
1986	Lone Star		TV documentary
1991	Ein Schloß am Wörthersee	Himself	Episode: "Saisonbeginn mit Hindernissen"
1997	Orleans	Judge Luther Charbonnet	8 episodes
2004	Dallas Reunion: The Return to Southfork	Himself / J.R. Ewing	TV special
2006	Nip/Tuck	Burt Landau	5 episodes
2006	Lindenstraße	Himself	
2006	The Simpsons	Wallace Brady	Episode: The Monkey Suit; Voice
2009	Somos cómplices	Richard Slater	Spanish soap opera
2010	Desperate Housewives	Frank Kaminsky	2 episodes
2010	Das Traumschiff	Larry Hagman	Episode: "Indian Summer"
2011	Ushi and the Family	Hairy Legman	
2012–2013	Dallas	J.R. Ewing	17 episodes

== Stage ==
- South Pacific (1950) London
- The Taming of the Shrew (1951) Broadway
- Comes a Day (1958) Broadway
- God and Kate Murphy (1958) Broadway
- The Nervous Set (1959) Broadway
- The Warm Peninsula (1959) Broadway
- The Beauty Part (1962) Broadway
- Love Letters (2005–2006) tour
