= Nick Ullett =

British-born American actor (born 1941)

Nicholas Metson Ullett (born 5 March 1941) is a British-born American actor. For a number of years, he was part of a comedy duo with Tony Hendra.

== Filmography ==
- Call of Duty: Finest Hour (2004) (VG) (voice) (as Nick Ullet)
- Yes, Dear (1 episode, 2003)
- When Billie Beat Bobby (2001) (TV movie)
- The Practice (2 episodes, 2000)
- Home Improvement (1 episode, 1999)
- As the World Turns (1956) TV series .... Graham Hawkins (unknown episodes, 1992–1994)
- Hook (1991)
- The Golden Girls (1 episode, 1991)
- Blossom (2 episodes, 1991)
- Night Court (2 episodes, 1990–1991)
- Murphy Brown (1 episode, 1991)
- Down and Out in Beverly Hills (1986)
- Three's a Crowd (1 episode, 1985)
- Down on Us (a.k.a. Beyond the Doors (video title)) (1984)

== Personal life ==
Ullett has been married to American film, stage and television actress Jenny O'Hara since 20 July 1986; they had three children. She is his fourth wife. He was previously married to Catherine Blum (1967–1970; divorced); Marcia Greene (1970–1976; divorced, with whom Ullett also had one child), and Joan Agda Wood Schneider (1980– divorced).
