= Jimmy McNichol =

American actor, singer (born 1961)

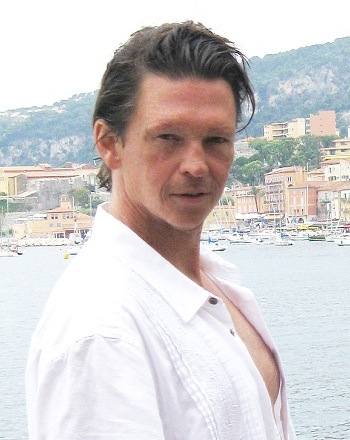
- McNichol in France, 2011
- Born: July 2, 1961 (age 65); Los Angeles, California, U.S.
- Occupations: Actor; singer; talk show host; real estate investor
- Years active: 1974–present
- Children: 3, including Kellee Maize
- Relatives: Kristy McNichol (sister)

James Vincent McNichol III (born July 2, 1961), known professionally as Jimmy McNichol, is an American actor and singer who first gained fame as a teen idol in the late 1970s. At the beginning of his career his popularity quickly grew, causing networks including CBS to create multiple television series specifically for him to be in leading roles or other parts. After making a record number of appearances on talk shows he was viewed by many as "the face you see everywhere".

In 1978, McNichol recorded an album with his sister, Kristy, who was also in acting. Next, they hosted a youth-oriented variety show for ABC and Jimmy had lead roles in Smokey Bites the Dust (1981), and opposite Susan Tyrrell in the horror film Butcher, Baker, Nightmare Maker (1981). After leaving acting in the 1990s, Jimmy McNichol moved with his family to Colorado and became active in environmentalist causes working as a real estate investor and home renovator.

== Biography ==
=== 1961–1966: Early life ===
James Vincent McNichol III was born July 2, 1961 in Los Angeles, to James and Carolyn McNichol. He is of Lebanese and Irish descent. He is the oldest of three siblings, with a sister Kristy (b. 1962) and brother Tommy (b. 1965). He grew up with a single mother after his father, a carpenter, abandoned the family shortly after Tommy's birth. Their mother worked as a registered nurse to support her family. Tommy grew up separately from Jimmy and Kristy, with their grandparents in Burbank, California.

=== 1967–1991: Acting and music career ===
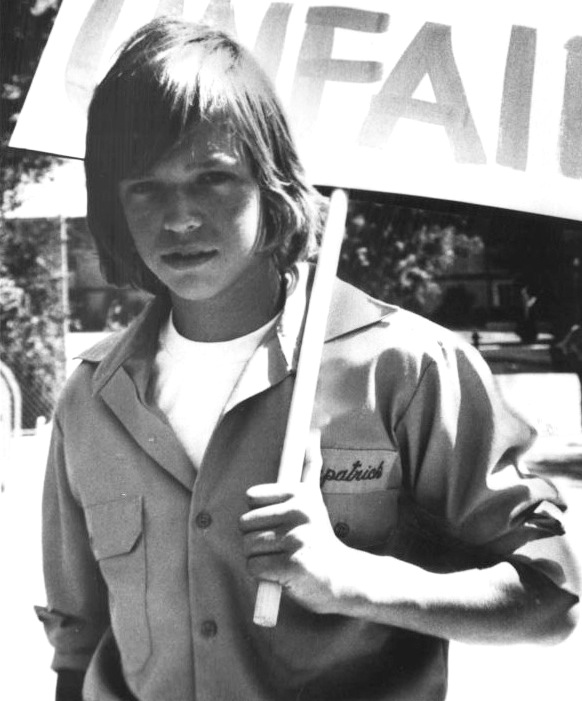
McNichol on The Fitzpatricks, 1977

Jimmy McNichol began his career at age 7, acting in a Band-Aid commercial. He appeared in about 80 commercials from 1967 to 1973, including spots for Kool-Aid and Crest. He landed minor roles on shows including Little House on the Prairie (1974) and S.W.A.T. (1975).

His first film appearance was an uncredited role in Sunshine (1973) at 12. His first regular starring role was as younger brother Jack on the network series The Fitzpatricks. Michele Tobin played his sister, Mo, on the show, and they later worked together on California Fever. McNichol sang the show's theme song and in 1978 recorded an album with his sister, Kristy and Jimmy McNichol, produced by Phil & Mitch Margo. The album spawned a hit single, a cover of The Chiffons' "He's So Fine", which charted at No. 70 on the Billboard Hot 100 in August 1978. The siblings also appeared as co-hosts of the fall 1978 ABC All-Star Saturday Preview Special, a youth-oriented sketch comedy show featuring Bee Gees, Donny Osmond, and other musical guests. Jimmy and his sister, however, ceased performing together after Kristy had a manic breakdown while the two were in France; she was diagnosed with bipolar disorder. Afterward, he stepped away from the music industry, later commenting: "I know the outcome—it's a real big high one year, and the next year, nobody knows who you are. All that singing and touring and the guys behind you doing drugs. Eventually it's gonna get to you."

When California Fever ended, Jimmy McNichol won the role as host of a weekly talk show, Hollywood Teen, as well as the Jimmy McNichol Special, which first aired in April 1980. He starred in the television film Champions: A Love Story (1979), a teen drama about an ex-hockey player and figure skater who fall in love. He subsequently appeared in several other successful made-for-TV movies, including the thriller Blinded by the Light (1980), starring opposite his sister Kristy as a gay teenager who escapes a religious cult. He made several low budget feature films including Smokey Bites the Dust (1981) and the horror film Butcher, Baker, Nightmare Maker (1982), co-starring with Susan Tyrrell and Bill Paxton.

In 1984, McNichol accepted the role of Josh Clayton on General Hospital. He performed in a band throughout the 1980s under the name "Jimmy James". His last major acting role was as Jill Ireland's son Valentine McCallum in the 1991 television film Reason for Living, co-starring Jill Clayburgh. After completing Reason for Living, at 30, McNichol decided to retire from acting.

=== 1992–present: Post-acting career ===
McNichol and Renée married in 1997. Their son, Nash, was born in late 1997 and daughter, Ellis, in late 1998. Jimmy McNichol is an avid environmentalist and in 1998 had a web site called ECOTV. After leaving acting, he began a career in residential construction and home renovation. He also collaborated with Playground Television and Pet Power Kids on Animal Rescue The Rockies (ARTR), a TV series documenting animal rescues.

In 2006, McNichol and his family moved from Santa Barbara, California, to Durango, Colorado, where as of 2016, he still lives. In 2010, he discovered he had a daughter Kellee Maize, a rapper, songwriter, and entrepreneur from Pittsburgh whose adoptive parents live in Pennsylvania. Kellee Maize's and his story was featured on the Oprah Winfrey Show in 2014.

== Filmography ==
=== Film ===
Year	Title	Role	Notes	Ref.
1973	Sunshine		Uncredited	
1976	Stranded	Tim Blake	Television film	
1979	Champions: A Love Story	Peter Scoggin III	Television film	
1980	Blinded by the Light	David Bowers	Television film	
1981	Smokey Bites the Dust	Roscoe Wilton		
1981	Butcher, Baker, Nightmare Maker	Billy Lynch	Also known as Night Warning	
1984	Escape from El Diablo	Daniel	Also known as California Cowboys	
1991	Reason for Living: The Jill Ireland Story	Valentine McCallum	Television film	
2012	Call to Action to Mayor Bloomberg: Sodas & Soap Operas	Himself	Short film	
2019	Mister America	Himself	Archive footage	

=== Television ===
Year	Title	Role	Notes	Ref.
1974	Run, Joe, Run	Robbie	Episode: "False Alarm"	
1974	Gunsmoke	Willie	Episode: "The Tarnished Badge"	
1974	Little House on the Prairie	Harry Baker	3 episodes	
1975	Shazam!	Kelly Martin	Episode: "Double Trouble"	
1975	S.W.A.T.	Youth	Episode: "Vigilante"	
1976	ABC After School Special: Me and Dad's New Wife			
1977–1978	The Fitzpatricks	Jack Fitzpatrick	13 episodes	
1979	California Fever	Vince Butler	10 episodes	
1983	The Love Boat	Charles Davidson	2 episodes	
1984–1985	General Hospital	Josh Clayton	Recurring role	
1985	ABC After School Special: First the Egg	David Hanna		
1995	V.R. Troopers	Brandon Sands	Episode: "A Hard Day's Mutant"	
2013–2014	On Cinema	Himself	2 episodes	
2017	Decker	Son of Dracula	5 episodes	

== Discography ==
- Kristy and Jimmy McNichol (RCA, 1978)

== Sources ==
- Dennis, Jeffery P. (2006). Queering Teen Culture: All-American Boys and Same-sex Desire in Film and Television. New York: Psychology Press. ISBN 978-1-560-23349-7.
