= The Return of the World's Greatest Detective =

1976 television film directed by Dean Hargrove

- Genre: Comedy; Mystery; Crime
- Written by: Dean Hargrove; Roland Kibbee
- Directed by: Dean Hargrove
- Starring: Larry Hagman; Jenny O'Hara; Nicholas Colasanto
- Music by: Dick DeBenedictis
- Country of origin: United States
- Original language: English

Production
- Producers: Dean Hargrove; Roland Kibbee
- Cinematography: William Mendenhall
- Editor: John Kaufman
- Production company: Universal Television

Original release
- Network: NBC
- Release: June 16, 1976

The Return of the World's Greatest Detective is a 1976 American made-for-television mystery comedy film starring Larry Hagman. Hagman plays a motorcycle cop named Sherman Holmes, who, after sustaining a head injury, becomes convinced that he is actually Sherlock Holmes and partners with his psychiatrist named Dr. Watson to solve crimes.

Dean Hargrove and Roland Kibbee wrote the film's story directly for television, intending it to be a pilot for a series that would have been titled Alias Sherlock Holmes. The film originally aired on NBC on June 16, 1976.

The genres into which The Return of the World's Greatest Detective fits are comedy-drama and mystery-suspense.

== Synopsis ==
Los Angeles Police Department officer Sherman Holmes (Hagman) is an inept motorcycle cop who cannot keep his police motorcycle from falling over on its side. He is lying on the ground, reading a copy of The Complete Sherlock Holmes, when his motorcycle again falls over on its side—but this time on his head, causing a cranial injury that leaves him comatose.

When he regains consciousness, Sherman Holmes has come to believe that he is actually Sherlock Holmes, the civilian consulting detective of literary renown. He also has acquired formidable powers of observation and deduction that he did not possess as a motorcycle officer. Holmes adopts the habits and mode of dress (houndtooth-gray Inverness cape, and "full-bent" meerschaum smoking pipe) of the literary detective, along with a stylized UK English dialect.

The social worker and psychiatrist assigned to work with Holmes is Dr. Joan Watson (Jenny O'Hara), the psychiatrist who had actually given Holmes the copy of the Sherlock Holmes "canon" in the first place. Her superior (Ivor Francis) warns that her job is at risk because of the situation. LAPD Detective Lt. Nicholas "Nick" Tinker (Nicholas Colasanto) is somewhat skeptical of what has happened to Holmes, but Watson points out that this Holmes wants anonymity as much as the literary Holmes did. She likewise arranges for him to move into Apartment 221B in an apartment complex located on Baker Street.

These strange occurrences take place at the same time of a case that has been baffling the LAPD: scandals that appear to involve a judge, the Honorable Clement Harley (Charles Macauley). Among these are the murder of an embezzler and a series of smoke-bombings. Holmes manages to solve both these cases—and expose an instance of judicial corruption in the process.

== Partial production history ==
Dean Hargrove, who directed the film and jointly wrote and produced it with Roland Kibbee, loosely re-made the 1971 feature film They Might Be Giants in producing it. He and Kibbee both hoped it would become the pilot of a series titled Alias Sherlock Holmes, but NBC-TV declined to pick up that option.

== Cast ==
- Sherman Holmes: Larry Hagman
- Dr. Joan Watson: Jenny O'Hara
- Lieutenant Nick Tinker: Nicholas Colasanto
- Himmel: Woodrow Parfrey
- The Landlady: Helen Verbit
- Spiner: Ivor Francis
- Judge Clement Harley: Charles Macauley
- Dr. Collins: Ron Silver
- Vince Cooley: Sid Haig
- The Psychiatrist: Booth Colman
- Mrs. Slater: Lieux Dressler
- The Detective: Fuddle Bagley
- Klinger: Benny Rubin
- The Manager: Robert Snively
- The Caretaker: Jude Farese
- The Sergeant: George Brenlin
- The Bailiff: Al Dunlap
- The Delivery Man: Jefferson Kibbee

== See also ==
- Sherlock Holmes pastiches
