= Jenny O'Hara =

American actress

- Born: February 24, 1942 (age 84); Sonora, California, U.S.
- Occupation: Actress
- Years active: 1964–present
- Spouses: August Dorr Watkins (m. 1968; div. 1974) Nick Ullett (m. 1986)
- Children: 2

Jenny O'Hara (born February 24, 1942) is an American film, television, and stage actress. She is best known for Dixie in My Sister Sam (1986–1988), Janet Heffernan in The King of Queens (2001–2007), and Nita in Big Love (2006–2009).

== Early life ==
O'Hara was born in Sonora, California. Her father, John B. O'Hara, was a salesman, and her mother, Edith (Hopkins) O'Hara, was a journalist and drama teacher, who founded and continued to run the 13th Street Repertory Company in New York City for many years before her death at age 103 in 2020. Jenny, her singer/actress younger sister Jill O'Hara, and her singer/guitarist brother Jack O'Hara, grew up amid their mother's pursuit of a theatrical career. John and Edith O'Hara eventually divorced. Jenny O'Hara debuted on stage at age 5 at the Bushkill Playhouse in the Poconos.

== Career ==
In 1964 O'Hara appeared on Broadway in the dramatic play Dylan. In 1969 she appeared in the musical The Fig Leaves Are Falling. Her other Broadway credits include Promises, Promises, The Iceman Cometh, and The Odd Couple.

In 1970, O'Hara succeeded her younger sister, Jill (who had been nominated for a Tony Award) in the musical Promises, Promises. She graduated to television, both in series and made-for-TV features, including starring roles in: Brinks: The Great Robbery, The Return of the World's Greatest Detective, Blind Ambition and Blinded by the Light with Kristy McNichol.

She later worked in movies such as Career Opportunities, A Mother's Prayer, Mystic River, Matchstick Men, Extract and Devil; was part of the ensemble cast for the first season of The Facts of Life and the entire run of My Sister Sam; and had guest roles on television series such as Kojak, Charlie's Angels, Quinn Martin's Tales of the Unexpected (also known in the United Kingdom as Twist in the Tale), Barnaby Jones, Barney Miller, Law & Order, The X-Files, Beverly Hills, 90210, NYPD Blue, ER, CHiPs, House M.D., Boston Legal, Reba, Six Feet Under, and Big Love. She has also made appearances over the years on various TV game shows.

On TV, O'Hara portrayed Ruth Manly on Black Beauty, Lottie Murphy in Costello, Rebecca in Highcliffe Manor, Janet Heffernan in The King of Queens, Muriel Spiegleman in Live In, Dixie Randazzo in My Sister Sam, and Lucy Dexter on Secrets of Midland Heights. She also had roles in the 2009 film, Extract, and the 2010 horror film, Devil.

O'Hara directed the off-Broadway play The Women Are No Different, which was about abuse of wives. In 1973, she owned and operated Jacob O'Hara Inc., a plant business in New York. She auctioned off plants and provided advice to people about caring for their plants.

== Personal life ==
O'Hara was married to August Dorr Watkins, an interior designer and former actor, from 1968 until their 1974 divorce. Since 1986, she has been married to British-born American actor Nick Ullett. Together they have two daughters.

== Filmography ==
=== Film ===
Year	Title	Role	Notes
1980	The Last Married Couple in America	Dancing Lady at First Party	
1980	Heart Beat	Betty Bendix	
1991	Career Opportunities	Dotty Dodge	
1994	Angie	Kathy	
1997	Wishmaster	Wendy Derleth	
1999	Love Happens	Gwen	
2003	Mystic River	Esther Harris	
2003	My Name is Yu Ming	Extra	Short
2003	Matchstick Men	Mrs. Schaffer	
2004	Mommy	Mommy	Short
2005	Forty Shades of Blue	Celia	
2006	Right at Your Door	Lexi's Mom	
2006	Two Weeks	Julia	
2007	The Christmas Miracle of Jonathan Toomey	Mrs. Hickey	
2009	Extract	Joel's Secretary	
2010	How to Make Love to a Woman	Mrs. Conners	
2010	Devil	Jane Kowski, Old Woman, The Devil	
2010	Heavy Lifting	Alice	Short
2011	'Hit List	Phil's Mother	
2012	As High as the Sky	Aunt Barbara (voice)	
2012	Sassy Pants	Grandma Pruitt	
2012	The Sacred	Ms. Jenson	
2014	BFFs	Suzie	
2014	In the Privacy of Your Own Home	Peg	Short
2015	Martha	Martha	Short
2015	A Kind of Magic	Great Grandmother	
2017	Who Decides	Women	Short film
2018	30 Nights	Dorothy	
2018	Duck Butter	Nathalie	
2018	Poor Greg Downing	Patricia	
2022	We Are Gathered Here Today	Faye Stone	
2026	The Remedy	Maria	

=== Television ===
Year	Title	Role	Notes
1975	The Wide World of Mystery	Shelley	Episode: "Rock-a-Die Baby"
1975	The Streets of San Francisco	Angela Atkinson	Episode: "Dead Air"
1975	The Rockford Files	Operator	Episode: "The Reincarnation of Angie"
1976	Brink's: The Great Robbery	Maggie Hefner	Television film
1976	The Return of the World's Greatest Detective	Dr. Joan Watson	Television film
1976	Charlie's Angels	Bloody Mary Barrows	Episode: "Hellride"
1976	Police Story	Joyce Triplett	2 episodes
1976–1979	Barnaby Jones	Dororthy Warner / Katherine Tyler / Angie Harding / Joanie Enders	5 episodes
1977	Westside Medical	Georgia	Episode: "King Solomon's Kid"
1977	Good Against Evil	The Woman	Television film
1977	Kojak	Ann Murray	Episode: "Laid Off"
1977	The Hunted Lady	Carol Arizzio	Television film
1977–1984	Tales of the Unexpected	Mary Ann / Pearson's Wife	2 episodes
1978	Black Beauty	Ruth Manly	Television mini-series
1978	A Fire in the Sky	Ann Webster	Television film
1978–1979	Barney Miller	Sgt. Holly Scofield / Teresa Schnable	2 episodes
1978–1980	Family	Miss Chase / Miss Montebello	2 episodes
1979	Highcliffe Manor	Rebecca	6 episodes
1979	David Cassidy: Man Undercover	Vickie	Episode: "Teammates"
1979	Starsky & Hutch	Marianne Owens	Episode: "Ballad for a Blue Lady"
1979	Blind Ambition	Liz Garfield	Television mini-series Part 1, 2, 3, & 4
1979	The Facts of Life	Miss Emily Mahoney	4 episodes
1979	Letters from Frank	Patty Miller	Television film
1979	The Edge of Night	Lilac	Episode: "#1.6144" Uncredited
1979–1981	CHiPs	Lina Beck / Cora Gilford	2 episodes
1980	Mrs. Columbo	Karen Winston	Episode: "Love, on Instant Replay"
1980	The Women's Room	Mrs. Martinelli	Television film
1980	The Last Song	Deb Pierce	Television film
1980	Blinded by the Light	Rose	Television film
1980–1981	Secrets of Midland Heights	Lucy Dexter	9 episodes
1981	Simon & Simon	Ann McDaniels	Episode: "Trapdoors"
1981	McClain's Law	Christine Simmons	Episode: "Let the Victims Beware"
1982	Bret Maverick	Samantha Dunne	Episode: "The Mayflower's Women Historical Society"
1982	Quincy, M.E.	Jane Snyder	Episode: "Deadly Protection"
1983	Another Woman's Child	Peggy	Television film
1983	Remington Steele	Amy Fogelson / Agnes Fowley	Episode: "Steele in the News"
1983	The Mississippi	Miranda Adams	Episode: "The Trial of Ben Walker"
1983	For Love and Honor	Mrs. Hagedorn	Episode: "N.O.K. Hagedorn"
1983–1984	Trapper John, M.D.	Emily McCall / Christina Kulyn	2 episodes
1984	St. Elsewhere	Sue Follett	Episode: "Drama Center"
1984	V: The Final Battle	Jenny	Television mini-series
	Tales of the Unexpected	Ruth Pearson	Episode "The Dirty Detail"
1985	Our Family Honor	Jo	Episode: "Lone Justice"
1986	Scarecrow and Mrs. King	Millicent McDonald	Episode: "Dead Men Leave No Trails"
1986–1988	My Sister Sam	Dixie Randazzo	44 episodes
1988	The Secret Life of Kathy McCormick	Lisa	Television film
1988	Winnie	Miriam	Television film
1988	Murphy Brown	Lisa	Episode: "Baby Love"
1989	Live-In	Muriel Spiegelman	9 episodes
1990	The Young Riders	Sally Tompkins / Shining Eyes	Episode: "Pride and Prejudice"
1990	L.A. Law	Dr. Sarah Evans	Episode: "Lie Harder"
1990	Married People	Delia	Episode: "Partners"
1991	ABC Afterschool Special	Irene Harmon	Episode: "The Less Than Perfect Daughter"
1991	Empty Nest	Mrs. Kravitz	Episode: "Lonely Are the Brave"
1991–1992	Beverly Hills, 90210	Pam Scanlon	2 episodes
1993	Law & Order	Carol Janssen	Episode: "Promises to Keep"
1993	At Home with the Webbers	Mrs. Nelson	Television film
1995	A Mother's Prayer	Val	Television film
1995	The Drew Carey Show	Judge White	Episode: "Drew in Court"
1996	Terminal	Margaret Desmond	Television film
1996	A Case for Life		Television film
1996	ER	Nurse Rhonda Sterling	2 episodes
1996	An Unexpected Family	Harriet Rothman	Television film
1996–1997	Dangerous Minds	Jean Warner	4 episodes
1996–1997	Life's Work	Constance 'Connie' Minardi	6 episodes
1997	Smart Guy	Principal Whitfield	Episode: "Trial and Error"
1998	Costello	Lottie Murphy	5 episodes
1998	Pumpkin Man	Mrs. Shadboldt	Television short
1998	Michael Hayes	Phyllis Burdick	Episode: "Under Color of Law"
1998	Chicago Hope	Dorothy Carlson	Episode: "Objects Are Closer Than They Appear"
1998	An Unexpected Life	Harriet Rothman	Television film
1998	The Color of Courage	Dorothy Renfrew	Television film
1999	Party of Five	Sylvia Wringler	2 episodes
1999	The Practice	Louise Morgan	Episode: "Bay of Pigs"
2000	Norm	Mrs. Ford	Episode: "Norm vs. the Wedding"
2000	If These Walls Could Talk 2	Marge Carpenter	Segment 1961
2000	The Truth About Jane	Beth	Television film
2000	Roswell	Ida Crawford	2 episodes
2001	Strong Medicine	Nancy	Episode: "Child Care"
2001	NYPD Blue	Mrs. Follender	Episode: "Hit the Road, Clark"
2001–2007	The King of Queens	Janet Heffernan	15 episodes
2002	Philly	Nora Temple	Episode: "Brotherly Love"
2002	The Court	Eleanor	Episode: "Snakes in the Grass"
2002	Nancy Drew	Hannah Green	Television film
2003	Reba	Grammy Elizabeth Hart	Episode: "And the Grammy Goes To..."
2003	Judging Amy	Mrs. Costin – Grandmother	Episode: "Tricks of the Trade"
2004	Nip/Tuck	Rachel Rosenberg	Episode: "Rose and Raven Rosenberg"
2005	Inconceivable	Lucy	Episode: "Sex, Lies and Sonograms"
2005	Six Feet Under	Garland Duncan	Episode: "Static"
2005	Twins	Ms. Rowan	Episode: "Model Student"
2005	CSI: Crime Scene Investigation	Sandra Walkey	Episode: "Secrets & Flies"
2005	Ghost Whisperer	Margaret Devine	Episode: "Hope and Mercy"
2005	Grey's Anatomy	Nadia's Mother	Episode: "Grandma Got Run Over by a Reindeer"
2006	Boston Legal	Judge Kimberly Ohlund	Episode: "Squid Pro Quo"
2006	Cold Case	Frances Campbell	Episode: "Fireflies"
2006–2009	Big Love	Nita	5 episodes
2007	House	Fran	Episode: "Airborne"
2008	The Closer	Karen Silva	Episode: "Speed Bump"
2008	NCIS	Alice Brodie	Episode: "Last Man Standing"
2009	Drop Dead Diva	Carla Shane	Episode: "What If?"
2010	Childrens Hospital	Georgene Lefkowits	Episode: "The End of the Middle"
2011–2014	Franklin & Bash	Nanette	3 episodes
2012	Unfair and Imbalanced	Cleo	Television film
2012	Rizzoli & Isles	Sister Winifred Callahan	2 episodes
2013	Emily Owens, M.D.	Julia	Episode: "Emily and... The Leap"
2013–2015	Newsreaders	Grandma Jordan / Mrs. Van Cleef	2 episodes
2014	Meme Weavers	Fern	Television film
2014	Supernatural	Julia Wilkinson	Episode: "Mother's Little Helper"
2014–2017	The Mindy Project	Dot	17 episodes
2015	Mike & Molly	Mickey	Episode: "Molly's Neverending Story"
2015	The McCarthys	Elaine	Episode: "Hall of Fame"
2015	Hot in Cleveland	Helen	Episode: "Cleveland Calendar Girls"
2015–2017	Transparent	Bryna	12 episodes
2016	Recovery Road		Episode: "My Loose Thread"
2016	Son of Zorn	Roberta	Episode: "The Battle of Thanksgiving"
2017	The Fosters	Woman at Hospital	Episode: "Dream a Little Dream"
2017	American Housewife	Mrs. Smith	Episode: "Then and Now"
2017	Chicago Fire	Ellie	Episode: "Carry Me"
2018	The Resident	Shirley Harris	Episode: "Identity Crisis"
2018	9-1-1	Nora	Episode: "Full Moon (Creepy AF)"
2019	Atypical	Elsa's mother	2 episodes
2020	Perry Mason	June Pitlick	2 episodes
2023	Never Have I Ever	Dr. Keyes	Episode: "...Lost My Virginity"
2025	Good American Family	Almeda	Recurring
2026	The Pitt	Candace O'Grady	Episode: "7:00 A.M." (season 2)

=== Video games ===
Year	Title	Role	Notes
2009	Bayonetta	Umbran Elder / Additional Voices	English version, voice
2012	The Secret World	Eleanor Franklin	
2014	Bayonetta 2	Umbran Elder	English version, voice
