= Kellee Maize =

American rapper

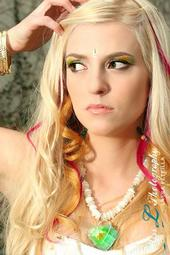
- Born: New Berlin, Pennsylvania, U.S.
- Occupations: Rapper; singer; songwriter; entrepreneur; actress; doula
- Years active: 2007–present
- Children: 1
- Relatives: Jimmy McNichol (biological father); Kristy McNichol (aunt)
- Musical career
- Origin: Pittsburgh, Pennsylvania, U.S.
- Genres: Hip hop; Baltimore club
- Instrument: Vocals
- Label: Independent Artist
- Website: www.kelleemaize.com

Kellee Maize (born January 18, 1980) is an American rapper, singer, and songwriter. Her first album, Age of Feminine, was released in 2007. Maize has recorded and released six full albums and several singles.

== Early life ==
Maize was born in Reading, Pennsylvania, and was adopted by Terry and Christine Maize, who lived in New Berlin, a small town in Central Pennsylvania. At 9 years old, she started her first rap group, Thunder and Lightning. Maize graduated from Mifflinburg Area High School. In her teens, she moved to Pittsburgh and in 2000 began rapping and singing on stage, but financial needs led her to the workforce. At 18 years old, Maize began studying at the University of Pittsburgh as a drama major and later switched her major to communications.

Maize worked at the Pittsburgh City Paper and began promoting events around the city. She was soon promoted to the position of events and promotions director. After experiencing her mother going through cancer and the sudden death of her father, Maize again turned to music as a way to cope.

== Career ==
=== Early career ===
In 2006 Maize founded Näkturnal, a Pittsburgh-based guerrilla marketing firm. Maize remains the owner and CEO of the company and uses the company to promote her own music.

Maize released her first rap album, Age of Feminine, independently on July 10, 2007. The album features traditional hip hop beats. The 11-song album received positive reviews with over two million listens and over one hundred thousand downloads. Her second album, Aligned Archetype, was released on January 20, 2010. The album features the sounds of dubstep, hip hop, and Baltimore club. The album became the featured album for FrostWire, where she became the Most Downloaded Artist on FrostWire, with over 135,000 full album downloads in one month.

=== Integration to present ===
Maize's third album, Integration, was released on November 11, 2011. The album received immediate attention as it was downloaded over 100,000 times within its first month of being released on FrostWire. At the time, the success of this album helped her become the most-downloaded artist on Amazon. In June 2011, she performed at Bonnaroo in Tennessee. She performed a 45-minute setlist along with long-time collaborator DJ Huggy. Maize then began work on her fourth studio album and released the single "Google Female Rapper", a freestyle over Twista’s popular song, "Overnight Celebrity".

During an interview in 2012 with XXL, Maize said she would like to change hip hop by "rapping and singing about things that aren’t found in mainstream hip-hop like yoga, environmentalism, oneness, spirituality, beings from other dimensions, and indigenous wisdom."

Maize's fourth album, Owl Time, was released on December 12, 2012.

Her fifth album, The 5th Element, was officially released on Valentine's Day 2014. The album had been available exclusively to the Jamendo community 10 days prior. By February 15, The 5th Element had gathered over 90,000 plays and over 6,000 downloads on Jamendo. The main theme of The 5th Element has been cited as love. The album design features over 1,000 fans that sent pictures of themselves displaying love in whatever way they saw fit.

Her sixth album, The Remixes, was released in 2015 and released nine remixes of Maize's songs.

She launched her acting career in June 2017, appearing as the character Popp in the Adult Swim show Decker.

== Personal life ==
Maize reconnected with her biological family at 22 years old. Her biological father is actor Jimmy McNichol, who fathered her at age 18, and her biological aunt is former actress Kristy McNichol. Maize and McNichol unsuccessfully pitched a television special, which they hoped could tell their story of reconnecting. Through McNichol, Maize has two siblings. Maize is married to Joey Rahimi and has three children, one son and two daughters.

As of 2016, Maize lives in the Shadyside neighborhood of Pittsburgh, Pennsylvania.

=== Activism and spirituality ===
Maize is an activist on women's rights, environmentalism, and issues relating to poverty and racism. Her spiritual side is reflected in her music. She studies world and environmental issues, the power of intention, meditation, quantum physics, astrology, Tarot and indigenous wisdom. In 2012, of her meditation practice, Maize said, "I learned Transcendental Meditation many years ago and found it to be life changing."

In 2013 Maize performed at Zeitgeist Media festivals in Los Angeles and New York City supporting The Zeitgeist Movement. Maize also appeared in TZM founder Peter Joseph's short documentary Culture in Decline 6: Take of Two Worlds. In 2020 she appeared in Peter Joseph's movie InterReflections singing "Welcome to the Freak Show" song.

Maize has said that she "has issues with politics" but supported Hillary Clinton in the 2016 Presidential Election. She released a single, "#MakeLoveNotTrump" online on October 19, 2016, in opposition to candidate Donald Trump.

== Awards and nominations ==
In polls taken by the Pittsburgh City Paper, Maize was voted in the "Top 3 Best Hip Hop Performers" three years in a row (2008–2010). In 2010, Maize was nominated as "Best Female Artist at the Pittsburgh Hip Hop Awards".

Maize's single "City of Champions", which was on her album Aligned Archetype, competed against Wiz Khalifa's "Black and Yellow" as the Pittsburgh Steelers' favorite "Road to the Super Bowl" song.

In 2011, Maize was nominated as one of Pittsburgh Magazine's and PUMP's 40 Under 40. The award recognizes individuals that are committed to shaping Western Pennsylvania.

== Discography ==
Discography:

- Age of Feminine (2007)
- Aligned Archetype (2010)
- Integration (2011)
- Owl Time (2012)
- The 5th Element (2014)
- The Remixes (2015)
- "#MakeLoveNotTrump" - single (2016)
- Crown (2017)

== Filmography ==
Film
| Year | Title | Role | Ref. |
|---|---|---|---|
| 2017 | Decker | Popp | Episode: "Private Sector" |
| 2020 | InterReflections | Freak Show Human Resources | |
