= Scott Kalvert =

American film director (1964–2014)

- Born: August 15, 1964; New York City, New York, U.S.
- Died: March 5, 2014 (aged 49); Woodland Hills, California, U.S.
- Occupation: Film director
- Years active: 1988–2014

Scott Kalvert (August 15, 1964 – March 5, 2014) was an American film director, known mainly for his 1995 film The Basketball Diaries, starring Leonardo DiCaprio and Mark Wahlberg, and 2002's Deuces Wild, starring Stephen Dorff and Brad Renfro.

He was also a successful music video director, collaborating with artists such as Cyndi Lauper, Jetboy, Snoop Dogg, DJ Jazzy Jeff and The Fresh Prince, Bobby Brown, Taylor Dayne, Deep Blue Something, Billy Ocean, Marky Mark and the Funky Bunch, LL Cool J, Samantha Fox, Eric B. & Rakim and Salt 'n' Pepa.

Kalvert was found dead in his home in Woodland Hills, Los Angeles, on March 5, 2014, from an apparent suicide. He was 49 years old, and left behind a wife and two daughters.

== Selected filmography ==
- The Basketball Diaries (1995)
- Deuces Wild (2002)
