= Rockwell Stephens =

Rockwell Rittenhouse Stephens (born February 16, 1900, Portland, Oregon; d. October, 1982, in South Woodstock, Vermont) was a journalist, author and ski instructor. He was an early member of the National Ski Patrol, joining in 1938, receiving member No. 74.

== Early life and family ==
Rockwell Rittenhouse Stephens was born February 16, 1900, the son of John Rittenhouse Stephens and his wife Cornelia Rockwell. Rockwell was the paternal grandson of William and Susanna (Rittenhouse) Stephens, of Germantown, Pennsylvania. Susanna was descended from a first cousin of David Rittenhouse, after whom Rittenhouse Square is named. Rockwell's maternal grandparents were Cleveland S. and Cornelia Rockwell. Cleveland S. Rockwell was an engineer for the U. S. Navy and a United States Coast Surveyor. In 1910, ten-year-old Rockwell Stephens was living with his mother Cornelia in a Philadelphia Ward 22 hotel. By 1920, Rockwell and his mother Cornelia had moved to Chicago. In 1918 his draft registration card, which was signed "Rockwell Rittenhouse Rockwell", indicated that he lived on University Avenue in Chicago, was a student attending University High School, and his nearest relative was "Mrs. Cornelia R. Rockwell" of the same address.

Rockwell was married to Isabella McLaughlin, daughter of Andrew C. McLaughlin, a Pulitzer Prize winning historian and past President of the American Historical Association. She survived him and continued to live at their house in Vermont until her own death in 1988.

== Career ==
From 1921 to 1926 he worked at the Chicago Daily News, writing about sport, autos and travel. In 1930, Rockwell R. Stephens, occupation "College Secretary", was living in Cambridge, Massachusetts with his wife Isabella and their eight-month-old daughter Susanna R. Stephens. He was president of Ski Sport Inc. of Boston from 1933 to 1943. He joined the faculty of the Putney School, Putney, Vermont, in 1952, and Woodstock Country School, Woodstock, Vermont, from 1953 to 1962. After moving to Vermont, he became a frequent contributor to the magazine Vermont Life.

Retiring to South Woodstock, Vermont, he became a tree harvester on his property there. His book on the subject "One Man's Forest" is still available, though there have been no recent printings.

One of his assignments at the Chicago Daily News was to report on routes for long-distance travel. Before the U.S. Route system and the Interstate Highway System, long distance automobile travel was dependent on a knowledge of State, County and Local highways, many not well signposted. Rockwell Stephens travelled these highways and reported routes based on landmarks. He died October 18, 1982, at Woodstock, Vermont. He was survived by his wife Isabella, their two daughters and a son.

== Bibliography ==
- (With Charles N. Proctor) "The Art of Skiing", Harcourt, 1933.
- (With Proctor) "Skiing", Harcourt, 1936.
- "One Man's Forest: Pleasure and Profit from Your Own Woods" — Stephen Greene Press (1974) 159 pages ISBN 0-8289-0224-0 Hardback. ISBN 0-8289-0225-9 Paperback.
