= Andrew C. McLaughlin =

American historian (1861–1947)

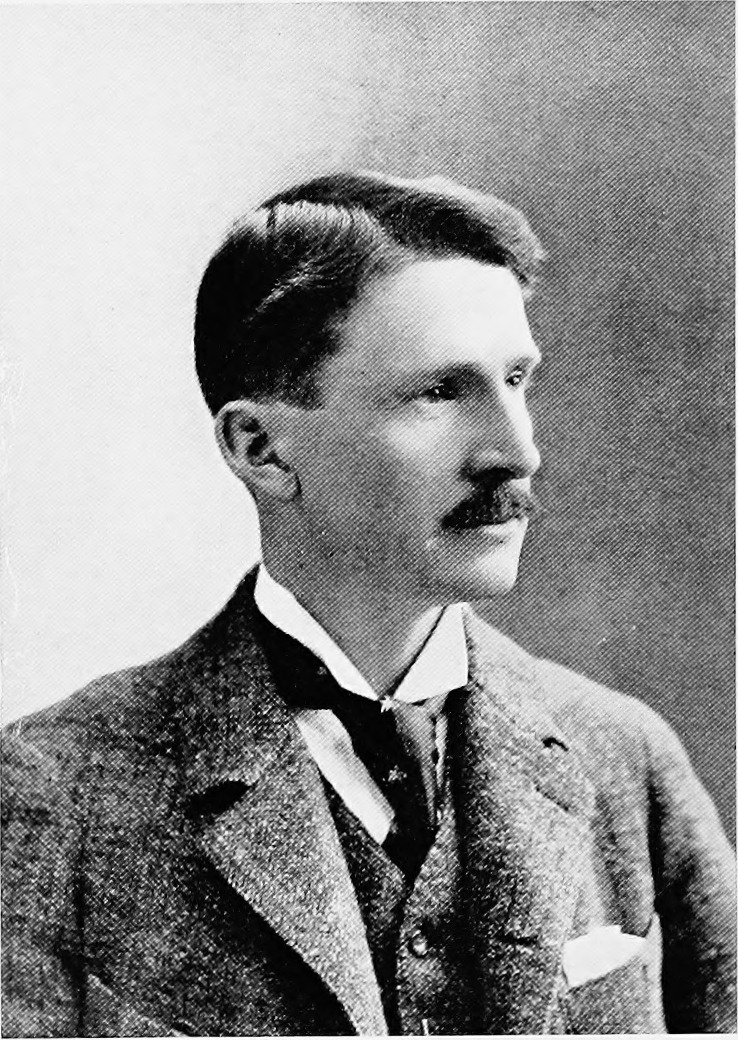
- Born: February 14, 1861; Beardstown, Illinois, U.S.
- Died: September 24, 1947 (aged 86)
- Education: University of Michigan (BA, LLB)
- Known for: American constitutional history
- Spouse: Lois Angell
- Scientific career
- Fields: History
- Workplaces: University of Michigan, University of Chicago

Andrew Cunningham McLaughlin (February 14, 1861 – September 24, 1947) was an American historian known as an authority on U.S. Constitutional history.

== Background ==
McLaughlin was born in Illinois and received his bachelor's and law degrees from the University of Michigan. His father was David McLaughlin, born in Dalkeith, Scotland in 1830. His mother was Isabella Campbell, born in Edinburgh, Scotland in 1819. His parents met on board ship when emigrating to the United States, settling in Beardstown, Illinois. David McLaughlin was a merchant and civic leader in Muskegon, MI, where a school and street are named for him.

== Career ==
Following his graduation, McLaughlin taught Latin at the University of Michigan, then transferred to the history department, where he taught American history until he was recruited in 1906 by University of Chicago president William Rainey Harper, teaching there until 1929.

By 1903 McLaughlin was a respected historian. He was selected to be the first director of the Department of Historical Research at the newly created Carnegie Institution in Washington, D.C., a post he held for two years. In 1914 he was named president of the American Historical Association, becoming an advocate for historians giving guidance on world events, touring the United Kingdom in 1918 to support its efforts in World War I, lecturing on the causes that had led the United States into the war. His book America and Britain (1919) was a compilation of these lectures.

== Works ==
McLaughlin's first major book Confederation and Constitution, 1783–1789 (1907) was a volume in the American Nation series, planned and edited by Albert Bushnell Hart of Harvard University. His other major works include The Courts, the Constitution, and Parties: Studiers in Constitutional History and Politics (1912) and The Foundations of American Constitutionalism (1932), based on the Anson G. Phelps Lectures delivered at New York University.

McLaughlin's magnum opus A Constitutional History of the United States (1935) won the 1936 Pulitzer Prize for History. Written for the average reader, the purpose is "to present briefly and clearly the constitutional history of the United States during nearly two centuries", not giving a history of constitutional law as announced by the courts, but of the development of constitutional principles in relation to political and social conditions and forces outside of the courtroom. "The most significant and conclusive constitutional decision was not rendered by a court of law but delivered at the famous meeting of General Grant and General Lee at Appomattox."

He left his papers at the University of Michigan.

Among the many students whom he mentored at the University of Chicago was the historian Henry Steele Commager.

== Personal life ==
In 1890 McLaughlin married Lois Thompson Angell, daughter of longtime University of Michigan president James B. Angell.

McLaughlin's brother James Campbell McLaughlin was a U.S. Representative from Michigan in 1907–1932. Other brothers include John Russell McLaughlin and David Chase McLaughlin.

=== Children ===
- Constance McLaughlin Green was also a Pulitzer Prize-winning historian who specialized in the history of Washington, D.C.
- James Angell MacLachlan was a Harvard Law School professor and co-founder of the National Bankruptcy Conference.
- Isabella Campbell McLaughlin married journalist and author Rockwell Stephens.
- Rowland Hazard McLaughlin (Cpt. U.S. Army), died in France in 1918.
- David Blair McLaughlin, died accidentally in 1914. The David Blair McLaughlin Prize for undergraduate non-fiction writing was established in his memory.
- Esther Lois McLaughlin (1900–1969)

== Works ==
- McLaughlin, Andrew C., History of Higher Education in Michigan (Government Printing Office, Washington, D.C., 1891)
- McLaughlin, Andrew C., Lewis Cass (Boston: Houghton, Mifflin and Co., 1891, 1899)
- McLaughlin, Andrew C., Elements of Civil Government of the State of Michigan (New York, Boston : Silver, Burdett and Co., 1892)
- McLaughlin, Andrew C., The Western Posts and the British Debts (Yale Review, 1895)
- McLaughlin, Andrew C., James Wilson in the Philadelphia Convention (Boston: Ginn and Co., The Athenaeum Press, 1897)
- McLaughlin, Andrew C., A History of the American Nation (New York: D. Appleton and Co., 1899, and later reprint editions)
- McLaughlin, Andrew C., The Teaching of American History: with Selected References Designed to Accompany A History of the American Nation (New York: D. Appleton and Co., 1899)
- McLaughlin, Andrew C., Sketch of Charles Pinckney's Plan for a Constitution, 1787 (American Historical Review, 1904)
- McLaughlin, Andrew C., Confederation and Constitution, 1783–1789 (New York: Harper, 1905, and later reprint editions) (American Nation Series)
- McLaughlin, Andrew C. and Claude H. Van Tyne, A History of the United States for Schools (New York: D. Appleton and Co., 1911, 1915)
- McLaughlin, Andrew C., The Courts, the Constitution, and Parties: Studies in Constitutional History and Politics (Chicago: University of Chicago Press, 1912).
- McLaughlin, Andrew C. and Albert Bushnell Hart (eds.), Cyclopedia of American Government (3 vols.) (1914)
- McLaughlin, Andrew C., The Great War: From Spectator to Participant (Government Printing Office, Washington, D.C., 1917)
- McLaughlin, Andrew C., America and Britain (1919)
- McLaughlin, Andrew C., Steps in the Development of American Democracy (New York: Abingdon Press, 1920)
- McLaughlin, Andrew C., The Foundations of American Constitutionalism (New York: New York University Press, 1932, and later reprint editions) (Anson G,. Phelps Lectures at New York University)
- McLaughlin, Andrew C., A Constitutional History of the United States (New York: D. Appleton Century Com., 1935) ISBN 978-1-931313-31-5

== Sources ==
- Waldo Gifford Leland, ""Recollections (1951)" and "The Reminiscences of Wald Gifford Leland" (1955 oral history) in Peter J. Wosh, ed., Waldo Gifford Leland and the Origins of the American Archival Profession (Chicago: Society of American Archivists, 2011).
  - Procter, Margaret (2012). "Waldo Gifford Leland and the Origins of the American Archival Profession". Journal of the Society of Archivists. 33 (2): 212–214. doi:10.1080/00379816.2012.722531. S2CID 109275140.
