= List of FIS Nordic World Ski Championships medalists in men's cross-country skiing =

This is a list of medalists from the FIS Nordic World Ski Championships in men's cross-country skiing. Numbers in brackets denotes number of victories in corresponding disciplines. Boldface denotes record number of victories.

== 18 km, 17 km and 15 km (discontinued) ==
Debuted: 1925. Not held: 1926. Resumed: 1927. Not held: 1993–1999. Resumed: 2001. Discontinued: 2023.
Classic style: 1925, 1927–1987, 1989, 2001, 2003, 2009, 2011, 2017, 2019. Free style: 1989, 1991, 2005, 2007, 2013, 2015, 2021, 2023.
Interval start: 1925, 1927–1991, 2001–2023.

| Championships | Gold | Silver | Bronze |
|---|---|---|---|
**18 km**
| 1925 Johannisbad | Otakar Německý; Czechoslovakia | František Donth; Czechoslovakia | Josef Erleback; Czechoslovakia |
| 1926 | Not included in the World Championships program | | |
| 1927 Cortina d'Ampezzo | John Lindgren; Sweden | František Donth; Czechoslovakia | Viktor Schneider; Germany |
| 1929 Zakopane | Veli Saarinen; Finland | Anselm Knuuttila; Finland | Hjalmar Bergström; Sweden |
**17 km**
| 1930 Oslo | Arne Rustadstuen; Norway | Trygve Brodahl; Norway | Tauno Lappalainen; Finland |
**18 km**
| 1931 Oberhof | Johan Grøttumsbråten; Norway | Kristian Hovde; Norway | Nils Svärd; Sweden |
| 1933 Innsbruck | Nils-Joel Englund; Sweden | Hjalmar Bergström; Sweden | Väinö Liikkanen; Finland |
| 1934 Sollefteå | Sulo Nurmela; Finland | Veli Saarinen; Finland | Martti Lappalainen; Finland |
| 1935 Vysoké Tatry | Klaes Karppinen; Finland | Oddbjørn Hagen; Norway | Olaf Hoffsbakken; Norway |
| 1937 Chamonix | Lars Bergendahl; Norway | Kalle Jalkanen; Finland | Pekka Niemi; Finland |
| 1938 Lahti | Pauli Pitkänen; Finland | Alfred Dahlqvist; Sweden | Kalle Jalkanen; Finland |
| 1939 Zakopane | Juho 'Jussi' Kurikkala; Finland | Klaes Karppinen; Finland | Carl Pahlin; Sweden |
| 1950 Lake Placid | Karl-Erik Åström; Sweden | Enar Josefsson; Sweden | Arnljot Nyaas; Norway |
**15 km**
| 1954 Falun | Veikko Hakulinen; Finland | Arvo Viitanen; Finland | August Kiuru; Finland |
| 1958 Lahti | Veikko Hakulinen **(2)**; Finland | Pavel Kolchin; Soviet Union | Anatoly Shelyukhin; Soviet Union |
| 1962 Zakopane | Assar Rönnlund; Sweden | Harald Grønningen; Norway | Einar Østby; Norway |
| 1966 Oslo | Gjermund Eggen; Norway | Ole Ellefsæter; Norway | Odd Martinsen; Norway |
| 1970 Vysoké Tatry | Lars-Göran Åslund; Sweden | Odd Martinsen; Norway | Fyodor Simashev; Soviet Union |
| 1974 Falun | Magne Myrmo; Norway | Gerhard Grimmer; East Germany | Vasily Rochev; Soviet Union |
| 1978 Lahti | Józef Łuszczek; Poland | Yevgeny Belyaev; Soviet Union | Juha Mieto; Finland |
| 1982 Oslo | Oddvar Brå; Norway | Alexander Zavyalov; Soviet Union | Harri Kirvesniemi; Finland |
| 1985 Seefeld | Kari Härkönen; Finland | Thomas Wassberg; Sweden | Maurilio De Zolt; Italy |
| 1987 Oberstdorf | Marco Albarello; Italy | Thomas Wassberg; Sweden | Mikhail Devyatyarov; Soviet Union |
| 1989 Lahti (freestyle) | Gunde Svan; Sweden | Torgny Mogren; Sweden | Lars Håland; Sweden |
| 1989 Lahti (classic) | Harri Kirvesniemi; Finland | Pål Gunnar Mikkelsplass; Norway | Vegard Ulvang; Norway |
| 1991 Val di Fiemme | Bjørn Dæhlie; Norway | Gunde Svan; Sweden | Vladimir Smirnov; Soviet Union |
| 1993–1999 | Not included in the World Championships program | | |
| 2001 Lahti | Per Elofsson; Sweden | Mathias Fredriksson; Sweden | Odd-Bjørn Hjelmeset; Norway |
| 2003 Val di Fiemme | Axel Teichmann; Germany | Jaak Mae; Estonia | Frode Estil; Norway |
| 2005 Oberstdorf | Pietro Piller Cottrer; Italy | Fulvio Valbusa; Italy | Tore Ruud Hofstad; Norway |
| 2007 Sapporo | Lars Berger; Norway | Leanid Karneyenka; Belarus | Tobias Angerer; Germany |
| 2009 Liberec | Andrus Veerpalu; Estonia | Lukáš Bauer; Czech Republic | Matti Heikkinen; Finland |
| 2011 Oslo | Matti Heikkinen; Finland | Eldar Rønning; Norway | Martin Johnsrud Sundby; Norway |
| 2013 Val di Fiemme | Petter Northug; Norway | Johan Olsson; Sweden | Tord Asle Gjerdalen; Norway |
| 2015 Falun | Johan Olsson; Sweden | Maurice Manificat; France | Anders Gløersen; Norway |
| 2017 Lahti | Iivo Niskanen; Finland | Martin Johnsrud Sundby; Norway | Niklas Dyrhaug; Norway |
| 2019 Seefeld | Martin Johnsrud Sundby; Norway | Alexander Bessmertnykh; Russia | Iivo Niskanen; Finland |
| 2021 Oberstdorf | Hans Christer Holund; Norway | Simen Hegstad Krüger; Norway | Harald Østberg Amundsen; Norway |
| 2023 Planica | Simen Hegstad Krüger; Norway | Harald Østberg Amundsen; Norway | Hans Christer Holund; Norway |

Medal table

| Rank | Nation | Gold | Silver | Bronze | Total |
|---|---|---|---|---|---|
| 1 | Norway | 12 | 11 | 14 | 37 |
| 2 | Finland | 11 | 5 | 10 | 26 |
| 3 | Sweden | 8 | 9 | 4 | 21 |
| 4 | Italy | 2 | 1 | 1 | 4 |
| 5 | Czechoslovakia | 1 | 2 | 1 | 4 |
| 6 | Estonia | 1 | 1 | 0 | 2 |
| 7 | Germany | 1 | 0 | 2 | 3 |
| 8 | Poland | 1 | 0 | 0 | 1 |
| 9 | Soviet Union | 0 | 3 | 5 | 8 |
| 10 | Belarus | 0 | 1 | 0 | 1 |
| 10 | Czech Republic | 0 | 1 | 0 | 1 |
| 10 | East Germany | 0 | 1 | 0 | 1 |
| 10 | France | 0 | 1 | 0 | 1 |
| 10 | Russia | 0 | 1 | 0 | 1 |
| Totals (14 entries) | | **37** | **37** | **37** | **111** |

== 50 km ==
Debuted: 1925. 50 km is one of only three events that has been contested at every FIS Nordic World Ski Championships.
Classic style: 1925–1985, 1997, 1999, 2005, 2007, 2013, 2015, 2021, 2023. Free style: 1987–1995, 2001, 2003, 2009, 2011, 2017, 2019, 2025.
Interval start: 1925–2003. Mass start: 2005–2025.

| Championships | Gold | Silver | Bronze |
|---|---|---|---|
| 1925 Johannisbad | František Donth; Czechoslovakia | František Häckel; Czechoslovakia | Antonín Ettrich; Czechoslovakia |
| 1926 Lahti | Matti Raivio; Finland | Tauno Lappalainen; Finland | Olav Kjelbotn; Norway |
| 1927 Cortina d'Ampezzo | John Lindgren; Sweden | John Wikström; Sweden | František Donth; Czechoslovakia |
| 1929 Zakopane | Anselm Knuuttila; Finland | Veli Saarinen; Finland | Olle Hansson; Sweden |
| 1930 Oslo | Sven Utterström; Sweden | Arne Rustadstuen; Norway | Adiel Paananen; Finland |
| 1931 Oberhof | Ole Stenen; Norway | Martin Peder Vangli; Norway | Karl Lindberg; Sweden |
| 1933 Innsbruck | Veli Saarinen; Finland | Sven Utterström; Sweden | Hjalmar Bergström; Sweden |
| 1934 Sollefteå | Elis Wiklund; Sweden | Nils-Joel Englund; Sweden | Olli Remes; Finland |
| 1935 Vysoké Tatry | Nils-Joel Englund; Sweden | Klaes Karppinen; Finland | Trygve Brodahl; Norway |
| 1937 Chamonix | Pekka Niemi; Finland | Klaes Karppinen; Finland | Vincenzo Demetz; Italy |
| 1938 Lahti | Kalle Jalkanen; Finland | Alvar Rantalahti; Finland | Lars Bergendahl; Norway |
| 1939 Zakopane | Lars Bergendahl; Norway | Klaes Karppinen; Finland | Oscar Gjøslien; Norway |
| 1950 Lake Placid | Gunnar Eriksson; Sweden | Enar Josefsson; Sweden | Nils Karlsson; Sweden |
| 1954 Falun | Vladimir Kuzin; Soviet Union | Veikko Hakulinen; Finland | Arvo Viitanen; Finland |
| 1958 Lahti | Sixten Jernberg; Sweden | Veikko Hakulinen; Finland | Arvo Viitanen; Finland |
| 1962 Zakopane | Sixten Jernberg (2); Sweden | Assar Rönnlund; Sweden | Kalevi Hämäläinen; Finland |
| 1966 Oslo | Gjermund Eggen; Norway | Arto Tiainen; Finland | Eero Mäntyranta; Finland |
| 1970 Vysoké Tatry | Kalevi Oikarainen; Finland | Vyacheslav Vedenin; Soviet Union | Gerhard Grimmer; East Germany |
| 1974 Falun | Gerhard Grimmer; East Germany | Stanislav Henych; Czechoslovakia | Thomas Magnuson; Sweden |
| 1978 Lahti | Sven-Åke Lundbäck; Sweden | Yevgeny Belyayev; Soviet Union | Jean-Paul Pierrat; France |
| 1982 Oslo | Thomas Wassberg; Sweden | Yuriy Burlakov; Soviet Union | Lars-Erik Eriksen; Norway |
| 1985 Seefeld | Gunde Svan; Sweden | Maurilio De Zolt; Italy | Ove Aunli; Norway |
| 1987 Oberstdorf | Maurilio De Zolt; Italy | Thomas Wassberg; Sweden | Torgny Mogren; Sweden |
| 1989 Lahti | Gunde Svan (2); Sweden | Torgny Mogren; Sweden | Alexey Prokurorov; Soviet Union |
| 1991 Val di Fiemme | Torgny Mogren; Sweden | Gunde Svan; Sweden | Maurilio De Zolt; Italy |
| 1993 Falun | Torgny Mogren (2); Sweden | Hervé Balland; France | Bjørn Dæhlie; Norway |
| 1995 Thunder Bay | Silvio Fauner; Italy | Bjørn Dæhlie; Norway | Vladimir Smirnov; Kazakhstan |
| 1997 Trondheim | Mika Myllylä; Finland | Erling Jevne; Norway | Bjørn Dæhlie; Norway |
| 1999 Ramsau | Mika Myllylä (2); Finland | Andrus Veerpalu; Estonia | Mikhail Botvinov; Austria |
| 2001 Lahti | Johann Mühlegg; Spain | René Sommerfeldt; Germany | Sergey Kriyanin; Russia |
| 2003 Val di Fiemme | Martin Koukal; Czech Republic | Anders Södergren; Sweden | Jörgen Brink; Sweden |
| 2005 Oberstdorf | Frode Estil; Norway | Anders Aukland; Norway | Odd-Bjørn Hjelmeset; Norway |
| 2007 Sapporo | Odd-Bjørn Hjelmeset; Norway | Frode Estil; Norway | Jens Filbrich; Germany |
| 2009 Liberec | Petter Northug; Norway | Maxim Vylegzhanin; Russia | Tobias Angerer; Germany |
| 2011 Oslo | Petter Northug; Norway | Maxim Vylegzhanin; Russia | Tord Asle Gjerdalen; Norway |
| 2013 Val di Fiemme | Johan Olsson; Sweden | Dario Cologna; Switzerland | Alexey Poltoranin; Kazakhstan |
| 2015 Falun | Petter Northug **(3)**; Norway | Lukáš Bauer; Czech Republic | Johan Olsson; Sweden |
| 2017 Lahti | Alex Harvey; Canada | Sergey Ustiugov; Russia | Matti Heikkinen; Finland |
| 2019 Seefeld | Hans Christer Holund; Norway | Alexander Bolshunov; Russia | Sjur Røthe; Norway |
| 2021 Oberstdorf | Emil Iversen; Norway | Alexander Bolshunov (Russia) Russian Ski Federation | Simen Hegstad Krüger; Norway |
| 2023 Planica | Pål Golberg; Norway | Johannes Høsflot Klæbo; Norway | William Poromaa; Sweden |
| 2025 Trondheim | Johannes Høsflot Klæbo; Norway | William Poromaa; Sweden | Simen Hegstad Krüger; Norway |

Medal table

| Rank | Nation | Gold | Silver | Bronze | Total |
|---|---|---|---|---|---|
| 1 | Sweden | 14 | 10 | 9 | 33 |
| 2 | Norway | 12 | 7 | 13 | 32 |
| 3 | Finland | 8 | 9 | 7 | 24 |
| 4 | Italy | 2 | 1 | 2 | 5 |
| 5 | Soviet Union | 1 | 3 | 1 | 5 |
| 6 | Czechoslovakia | 1 | 2 | 2 | 5 |
| 7 | Czech Republic | 1 | 1 | 0 | 2 |
| 8 | East Germany | 1 | 0 | 1 | 2 |
| 9 | Canada | 1 | 0 | 0 | 1 |
| 9 | Spain | 1 | 0 | 0 | 1 |
| 11 | Russia | 0 | 4 | 1 | 5 |
| 12 | Germany | 0 | 1 | 2 | 3 |
| 13 | France | 0 | 1 | 1 | 2 |
| 14 | Estonia | 0 | 1 | 0 | 1 |
| 14 | (Russia) Russian Ski Federation | 0 | 1 | 0 | 1 |
| 14 | Switzerland | 0 | 1 | 0 | 1 |
| 17 | Kazakhstan | 0 | 0 | 2 | 2 |
| 18 | Austria | 0 | 0 | 1 | 1 |
| Totals (18 entries) | | **42** | **42** | **42** | **126** |

== 30 km (discontinued) ==
Debuted: 1926. Not held: 1927–1950. Resumed: 1954. Discontinued: 2003.
Classic style: 1926, 1954–1995, 2001, 2003. Free style: 1997, 1999.
Interval start: 1926, 1954–2001. Mass start: 2003.

| Championships | Gold | Silver | Bronze |
|---|---|---|---|
| 1926 Lahti | Matti Raivio; Finland | Tauno Lappalainen; Finland | Veli Saarinen; Finland |
| 1927–1950 | Not included in the World Championships program | | |
| 1954 Falun | Vladimir Kuzin; Soviet Union | Veikko Hakulinen; Finland | Martti Lautala; Finland |
| 1958 Lahti | Kalevi Hämäläinen; Finland | Pavel Kolchin; Soviet Union | Sixten Jernberg; Sweden |
| 1962 Zakopane | Eero Mäntyranta; Finland | Janne Stefansson; Sweden | Giulio de Florian; Italy |
| 1966 Oslo | Eero Mäntyranta **(2)**; Finland | Kalevi Laurila; Finland | Walter Demel; West Germany |
| 1970 Vysoké Tatry | Vyacheslav Vedenin; Soviet Union | Gerhard Grimmer; East Germany | Odd Martinsen; Norway |
| 1974 Falun | Thomas Magnuson; Sweden | Juha Mieto; Finland | Jan Staszel; Poland |
| 1978 Lahti | Sergey Savelyev; Soviet Union | Nikolay Zimyatov; Soviet Union | Józef Łuszczek; Poland |
| 1982 Oslo | Thomas Eriksson; Sweden | Lars-Erik Eriksen; Norway | Bill Koch; United States |
| 1985 Seefeld | Gunde Svan; Sweden | Ove Aunli; Norway | Harri Kirvesniemi; Finland |
| 1987 Oberstdorf | Thomas Wassberg; Sweden | Aki Karvonen; Finland | Christer Majbäck; Sweden |
| 1989 Lahti | Vladimir Smirnov; Soviet Union | Vegard Ulvang; Norway | Christer Majbäck; Sweden |
| 1991 Val di Fiemme | Gunde Svan **(2)**; Sweden | Vladimir Smirnov; Soviet Union | Vegard Ulvang; Norway |
| 1993 Falun | Bjørn Dæhlie; Norway | Vegard Ulvang; Norway | Vladimir Smirnov; Kazakhstan |
| 1995 Thunder Bay | Vladimir Smirnov **(2)**; Kazakhstan | Bjørn Dæhlie; Norway | Alexey Prokurorov; Russia |
| 1997 Trondheim | Alexey Prokourorov; Russia | Bjørn Dæhlie; Norway | Thomas Alsgaard; Norway |
| 1999 Ramsau | Mika Myllylä; Finland | Thomas Alsgaard; Norway | Bjørn Dæhlie; Norway |
| 2001 Lahti | Andrus Veerpalu; Estonia | Frode Estil; Norway | Mikhail Ivanov; Russia |
| 2003 Val di Fiemme | Thomas Alsgaard; Norway | Anders Aukland; Norway | Frode Estil; Norway |

Medal table

| Rank | Nation | Gold | Silver | Bronze | Total |
|---|---|---|---|---|---|
| 1 | Finland | 5 | 5 | 3 | 13 |
| 2 | Sweden | 5 | 1 | 3 | 9 |
| 3 | Soviet Union | 4 | 3 | 0 | 7 |
| 4 | Norway | 2 | 9 | 5 | 16 |
| 5 | Russia | 1 | 0 | 2 | 3 |
| 6 | Kazakhstan | 1 | 0 | 1 | 2 |
| 7 | Estonia | 1 | 0 | 0 | 1 |
| 8 | East Germany | 0 | 1 | 0 | 1 |
| 9 | Poland | 0 | 0 | 2 | 2 |
| 10 | Italy | 0 | 0 | 1 | 1 |
| 10 | United States | 0 | 0 | 1 | 1 |
| 10 | West Germany | 0 | 0 | 1 | 1 |
| Totals (12 entries) | | **19** | **19** | **19** | **57** |

== 4 × 10/7.5 km relay ==
Debuted: 1933.
4×10 km classic style: 1933–1985. 4×10 km free style: 1987. 2×10 km classic style + 2×10 km free style: 1989–2023.
2×7.5 km classic style + 2×7.5 km free style: 2025.

| Championships | Gold | Silver | Bronze |
|---|---|---|---|
**4 × 10 km relay**
| 1933 Innsbruck | Per-Erik Hedlund; Sven Utterström; Nils-Joel Englund; Hjalmar Bergström; Sweden | František Šimůnek; Vladimír Novák; Antonín Bartoň; Cyril Musil; Czechoslovakia | Hugo Gstrein; Hermann Gadner; Balthasar Niederkofler; Harald Paumgarten; Austria |
| 1934 Sollefteå | Sulo Nurmela; Klaes Karppinen; Martti Lappalainen; Veli Saarinen; Finland | Walter Motz; Josef Schreiner; Willy Bogner; Herbert Leupold; Germany | Allan Karlsson; Lars Theodor Jonsson; Nils-Joel Englund; Arthur Häggblad; Sweden |
| 1935 Vysoké Tatry | Mikko Husu; Klaes Karppinen; Väinö Liikkanen; Sulo Nurmela (2); Finland | Trygve Brodahl; Bjarne Iversen; Olaf Hoffsbakken; Oddbjørn Hagen; Norway | Halvar Moritz; Erik August Larsson; Martin Matsbo; Nils-Joel Englund; Sweden |
| 1937 Chamonix | Annar Ryen; Oskar Fredriksen; Sigurd Røen; Lars Bergendahl; Norway | Pekka Niemi; Klaes Karppinen; Juho 'Jussi' Kurikkala; Kalle Jalkanen; Finland | Giulio Gerardi; Aristide Compagnoni; Silvio Confortola; Vincenzo Demetz; Italy |
| 1938 Lahti | Juho 'Jussi' Kurikkala; Martti Lauronen; Pauli Pitkänen; Klaes Karppinen; Finland | Ragnar Ringstad; Olav Økern; Arne Larsen; Lars Bergendahl; Norway | Sven Hansson; Donald Johansson; Sigurd Nilsson; Martin Matsbo; Sweden |
| 1939 Zakopane | Pauli Pitkänen (2); Olavi Alakulppi; Eino Olkinuora; Klaes Karppinen (4); Finland | Alvar Hägglund; Selm Stenvall; John Westbergh; Carl Pahlin; Sweden | Aristide Compagnoni; Severino Compagnoni; Goffredo Baur; Alberto Jammaron; Italy |
| 1950 Lake Placid | Nils Täpp; Karl-Erik Åström; Martin Lundström; Enar Josefsson; Sweden | Heikki Hasu; Viljo Vellonen; Paavo Lonkila; August Kiuru; Finland | Martin Stokken; Eilert Dahl; Kristian Bjørn; Henry Hermansen; Norway |
| 1954 Falun | August Kiuru; Tapio Mäkelä; Arvo Viitanen; Veikko Hakulinen; Finland | Nikolay Kozlov; Fyodor Terentyev; Aleksey Kuznetsov; Vladimir Kuzin; Soviet Union | Sune Larsson; Sixten Jernberg; Arthur Olsson; Per-Erik Larsson; Sweden |
| 1958 Lahti | Sixten Jernberg; Lennart Larsson; Sture Grahn; Per-Erik Larsson; Sweden | Fyodor Terentyev; Nikolay Anikin; Anatoly Shelyukhin; Pavel Kolchin; Soviet Union | Kalevi Hämäläinen; Arto Tiainen; Arvo Viitanen; Veikko Hakulinen; Finland |
| 1962 Zakopane | Lars Olsson; Sture Grahn (2); Sixten Jernberg (2); Assar Rönnlund; Sweden | Väinö Huhtala; Kalevi Laurila; Pentti Pesonen; Eero Mäntyranta; Finland | Ivan Utrobin; Pavel Kolchin; Aleksey Kuznetsov; Gennady Vaganov; Soviet Union |
| 1966 Oslo | Odd Martinsen; Harald Grønningen; Ole Ellefsæter; Gjermund Eggen; Norway | Kalevi Oikarainen; Hannu Taipale; Kalevi Laurila; Eero Mäntyranta; Finland | Giulio de Florian; Franco Nones; Gianfranco Stella; Franco Manfroi; Italy |
| 1970 Vysoké Tatry | Vladimir Voronkov; Valery Tarakanov; Fyodor Simashev; Vyacheslav Vedenin; Soviet Union | Gerd Hessler; Axel Lesser; Gerhard Grimmer; Gert-Dietmar Klause; East Germany | Ove Lestander; Jan Halvarsson; Ingvar Sandström; Lars-Göran Åslund; Sweden |
| 1974 Falun | Gerd Hessler; Dieter Meinel; Gerhard Grimmer; Gert-Dietmar Klause; East Germany | Ivan Garanin; Fyodor Simashev; Vasily Rochev; Yuri Skobov; Soviet Union | Magne Myrmo; Odd Martinsen; Ivar Formo; Oddvar Brå; Norway |
| 1978 Lahti | Sven-Åke Lundbäck; Christer Johansson; Tommy Limby; Thomas Magnuson; Sweden | Esko Lähtevänoja; Juha Mieto; Pertti Teurajärvi; Matti Pitkänen; Finland | Lars-Erik Eriksen; Ove Aunli; Ivar Formo; Oddvar Brå; Norway |
| 1982 Oslo | Lars-Erik Eriksen; Ove Aunli; Pål Gunnar Mikkelsplass; Oddvar Brå; Norway shared with Vladimir Nikitin; Oleksandr Batyuk; Yuriy Burlakov; Alexander Zavyalov; Soviet Union | (None) | Uwe Bellmann; Uwe Wünsch; Stefan Schicker; Frank Schröder; East Germany shared with Kari Härkönen; Aki Karvonen; Harri Kirvesniemi; Juha Mieto; Finland |
| 1985 Seefeld | Arild Monsen; Pål Gunnar Mikkelsplass (2); Tor Håkon Holte; Ove Aunli (2); Norway | Marco Albarello; Giorgio Vanzetta; Maurilio De Zolt; Giuseppe Ploner; Italy | Erik Östlund; Thomas Wassberg; Thomas Eriksson; Gunde Svan; Sweden |
| 1987 Oberstdorf | Erik Östlund; Gunde Svan; Thomas Wassberg; Torgny Mogren; Sweden | Oleksandr Batyuk; Vladimir Smirnov; Mikhail Devyatyarov; Vladimir Sakhnov; Soviet Union | Ove Aunli; Vegard Ulvang; Pål Gunnar Mikkelsplass; Terje Langli; Norway |
| 1989 Lahti | Christer Majbäck; Gunde Svan (2); Lars Håland; Torgny Mogren (2); Sweden | Aki Karvonen; Harri Kirvesniemi; Kari Ristanen; Jari Räsänen; Finland | Ladislav Švanda; Martin Petrášek; Radim Nyč; Václav Korunka; Czechoslovakia |
| 1991 Val di Fiemme | Øyvind Skaanes; Terje Langli; Vegard Ulvang; Bjørn Dæhlie; Norway | Thomas Eriksson; Christer Majbäck; Gunde Svan; Torgny Mogren; Sweden | Mika Kuusisto; Harri Kirvesniemi; Jari Isometsä; Jari Räsänen; Finland |
| 1993 Falun | Sture Sivertsen; Vegard Ulvang (2); Terje Langli (2); Bjørn Dæhlie; Norway | Maurilio De Zolt; Marco Albarello; Giorgio Vanzetta; Silvio Fauner; Italy | Andrey Kirillov; Igor Badamchin; Alexey Prokurorov; Mikhail Botvinov; Russia |
| 1995 Thunder Bay | Sture Sivertsen; Erling Jevne; Bjørn Dæhlie; Thomas Alsgaard; Norway | Karri Hietamäki; Harri Kirvesniemi; Jari Räsänen; Jari Isometsä; Finland | Fulvio Valbusa; Marco Albarello; Fabio Maj; Silvio Fauner; Italy |
| 1997 Trondheim | Sture Sivertsen (3); Erling Jevne (2); Bjørn Dæhlie (4); Thomas Alsgaard; Norway | Harri Kirvesniemi; Mika Myllylä; Jari Räsänen; Jari Isometsä; Finland | Giorgio Di Centa; Silvio Fauner; Pietro Piller Cottrer; Fulvio Valbusa; Italy |
| 1999 Ramsau | Markus Gandler; Alois Stadlober; Mikhail Botvinov; Christian Hoffmann; Austria | Espen Bjervig; Erling Jevne; Bjørn Dæhlie; Thomas Alsgaard; Norway | Giorgio Di Centa; Fabio Maj; Fulvio Valbusa; Silvio Fauner; Italy |
| 2001 Lahti | Frode Estil; Odd-Bjørn Hjelmeset; Thomas Alsgaard; Tor Arne Hetland; Norway | Urban Lindgren; Mathias Fredriksson; Magnus Ingesson; Per Elofsson; Sweden | Jens Filbrich; Andreas Schlütter; Ron Spanuth; René Sommerfeldt; Germany |
| 2003 Val di Fiemme | Anders Aukland; Frode Estil; Tore Ruud Hofstad; Thomas Alsgaard (4); Norway | Jens Filbrich; Andreas Schlütter; René Sommerfeldt; Axel Teichmann; Germany | Anders Södergren; Per Elofsson; Mathias Fredriksson; Jörgen Brink; Sweden |
| 2005 Oberstdorf | Odd-Bjørn Hjelmeset; Frode Estil (3); Lars Berger; Tore Ruud Hofstad; Norway | Jens Filbrich; Andreas Schlütter; Tobias Angerer; Axel Teichmann; Germany | Nikolay Pankratov; Vasily Rochev; Yevgeny Dementyev; Nikolay Bolschakov; Russia |
| 2007 Sapporo | Eldar Rønning; Odd-Bjørn Hjelmeset; Lars Berger (2); Petter Northug; Norway | Nikolai Pankratov; Vasily Rochev; Alexander Legkov; Evgeni Dementiev; Russia | Martin Larsson; Mathias Fredriksson; Marcus Hellner; Anders Södergren; Sweden |
| 2009 Liberec | Eldar Rønning; Odd-Bjørn Hjelmeset (4); Tore Ruud Hofstad (3); Petter Northug; Norway | Jens Filbrich; Tobias Angerer; Franz Göring; Axel Teichmann; Germany | Matti Heikkinen; Sami Jauhojärvi; Teemu Kattilakoski; Ville Nousiainen; Finland |
| 2011 Oslo | Martin Johnsrud Sundby; Eldar Rønning; Tord Asle Gjerdalen; Petter Northug; Norway | Daniel Rickardsson; Johan Olsson; Anders Södergren; Marcus Hellner; Sweden | Jens Filbrich; Axel Teichmann; Franz Göring; Tobias Angerer; Germany |
| 2013 Val di Fiemme | Tord Asle Gjerdalen (2); Eldar Rønning (4); Sjur Røthe; Petter Northug; Norway | Daniel Richardsson; Johan Olsson; Marcus Hellner; Calle Halfvarsson; Sweden | Evgeniy Belov; Maxim Vylegzhanin; Alexander Legkov; Sergey Ustiugov; Russia |
| 2015 Falun | Niklas Dyrhaug; Didrik Tønseth; Anders Gloeersen; Petter Northug **(5)**; Norway | Daniel Richardsson; Johan Olsson; Marcus Hellner; Calle Halfvarsson; Sweden | Jean-Marc Gaillard; Maurice Manificat; Robin Duvillard; Adrien Backscheider; France |
| 2017 Lahti | Didrik Tønseth (2); Niklas Dyrhaug (2); Martin Johnsrud Sundby; Finn Hågen Krogh; Norway | Andrey Larkov; Alexander Bessmertnykh; Aleksey Chervotkin; Sergey Ustiugov; Russia | Daniel Richardsson; Johan Olsson; Marcus Hellner; Calle Halfvarsson; Sweden |
| 2019 Seefeld | Emil Iversen; Martin Johnsrud Sundby (3); Sjur Røthe (2); Johannes Høsflot Klæbo; Norway | Andrey Larkov; Alexander Bessmertnykh; Alexander Bolshunov; Sergey Ustiugov; Russia | Adrien Backscheider; Maurice Manificat; Clément Parisse; Richard Jouve; France |
| 2021 Oberstdorf | Pål Golberg; Emil Iversen; Hans Christer Holund; Johannes Høsflot Klæbo; Norway | Aleksey Chervotkin; Ivan Yakimushkin; Artem Maltsev; Alexander Bolshunov (Russia) Russian Ski Federation | Hugo Lapalus; Maurice Manificat; Clément Parisse; Jules Lapierre; France |
| 2023 Planica | Hans Christer Holund (2); Pål Golberg (2); Simen Hegstad Krüger; Johannes Høsflot Klæbo; Norway | Ristomatti Hakola; Iivo Niskanen; Perttu Hyvärinen; Niko Anttola; Finland | Albert Kuchler; Janosch Brugger; Jonas Dobler; Friedrich Moch; Germany |
**4 × 7.5 km relay**
| 2025 Trondheim | Erik Valnes; Martin Løwstrøm Nyenget; Harald Østberg Amundsen; Johannes Høsflot Klæbo (4); Norway | Cyril Fähndrich; Jonas Baumann; Jason Rüesch; Valerio Grond; Switzerland | Truls Gisselman; William Poromaa; Jens Burman; Edvin Anger; Sweden |

Medal table

| Rank | Nation | Gold | Silver | Bronze | Total |
|---|---|---|---|---|---|
| 1 | Norway | 21 | 3 | 4 | 28 |
| 2 | Sweden | 7 | 6 | 10 | 23 |
| 3 | Finland | 5 | 9 | 4 | 18 |
| 4 | Soviet Union | 2 | 4 | 1 | 7 |
| 5 | East Germany | 1 | 1 | 1 | 3 |
| 6 | Austria | 1 | 0 | 1 | 2 |
| 7 | Germany | 0 | 4 | 3 | 7 |
| 8 | Russia | 0 | 3 | 3 | 6 |
| 9 | Italy | 0 | 2 | 6 | 8 |
| 10 | Czechoslovakia | 0 | 1 | 1 | 2 |
| 11 | (Russia) Russian Ski Federation | 0 | 1 | 0 | 1 |
| 11 | Switzerland | 0 | 1 | 0 | 1 |
| 13 | France | 0 | 0 | 3 | 3 |
| Totals (13 entries) | | **37** | **35** | **37** | **109** |

== 10 km ==
Debuted: 1991. Not held: 2001–2023. Resumed: 2025.
Classic style: 1991–1999, 2025. Interval start: 1991–1999, 2025.

| Championships | Gold | Silver | Bronze |
|---|---|---|---|
| 1991 Val di Fiemme | Terje Langli; Norway | Christer Majbäck; Sweden | Torgny Mogren; Sweden |
| 1993 Falun | Sture Sivertsen; Norway | Vladimir Smirnov; Kazakhstan | Vegard Ulvang; Norway |
| 1995 Thunder Bay | Vladimir Smirnov; Kazakhstan | Bjørn Dæhlie; Norway | Mika Myllylä; Finland |
| 1997 Trondheim | Bjørn Dæhlie; Norway | Alexey Prokurorov; Russia | Mika Myllylä; Finland |
| 1999 Ramsau | Mika Myllylä; Finland | Alois Stadlober; Austria | Odd-Bjørn Hjelmeset; Norway |
| 2001–2023 | Not included in the World Championships program | | |
| 2025 Trondheim | Johannes Høsflot Klæbo; Norway | Erik Valnes; Norway | Harald Østberg Amundsen; Norway |

Medal table

| Rank | Nation | Gold | Silver | Bronze | Total |
|---|---|---|---|---|---|
| 1 | Norway | 4 | 2 | 3 | 9 |
| 2 | Kazakhstan | 1 | 1 | 0 | 2 |
| 3 | Finland | 1 | 0 | 2 | 3 |
| 4 | Sweden | 0 | 1 | 1 | 2 |
| 5 | Austria | 0 | 1 | 0 | 1 |
| 5 | Russia | 0 | 1 | 0 | 1 |
| Totals (6 entries) | | **6** | **6** | **6** | **18** |

== Combined/double pursuit/Skiathlon ==
Debuted: 1993.

| Championships | Gold | Silver | Bronze |
|---|---|---|---|
**10 km classic interval start + 15 km freestyle pursuit. Separate days.**
| 1993 Falun | Bjørn Dæhlie; Norway | Vladimir Smirnov; Kazakhstan | Silvio Fauner; Italy |
| 1995 Thunder Bay | Vladimir Smirnov; Kazakhstan | Silvio Fauner; Italy | Jari Isometsä; Finland |
| 1997 Trondheim | Bjørn Dæhlie **(2)**; Norway | Mika Myllylä; Finland | Alexey Prokurorov; Russia |
| 1999 Ramsau | Thomas Alsgaard; Norway | Mika Myllylä; Finland | Fulvio Valbusa; Italy |
**10 km classic interval start + 10 km freestyle pursuit. Same day.**
| 2001 Lahti | Per Elofsson; Sweden | Johann Mühlegg; Spain | Vitaly Denisov; Russia |
**10 km classic mass start; then 10 km freestyle pursuit**
| 2003 Val di Fiemme | Per Elofsson **(2)**; Sweden | Tore Ruud Hofstad; Norway | Jörgen Brink; Sweden |
**15 km classic mass start; then 15 km freestyle pursuit**
| 2005 Oberstdorf | Vincent Vittoz; France | Giorgio Di Centa; Italy | Frode Estil; Norway |
| 2007 Sapporo | Axel Teichmann; Germany | Tobias Angerer; Germany | Pietro Piller Cottrer; Italy |
| 2009 Liberec | Petter Northug; Norway | Anders Södergren; Sweden | Giorgio Di Centa; Italy |
| 2011 Oslo | Petter Northug **(2)**; Norway | Maxim Vylegzhanin; Russia | Ilia Chernousov; Russia |
| 2013 Val di Flemme | Dario Cologna; Switzerland | Martin Johnsrud Sundby; Norway | Sjur Røthe; Norway |
| 2015 Falun | Maxim Vylegzhanin; Russia | Dario Cologna; Switzerland | Alex Harvey; Canada |
| 2017 Lahti | Sergey Ustiugov; Russia | Martin Johnsrud Sundby; Norway | Finn Hågen Krogh; Norway |
| 2019 Seefeld | Sjur Røthe; Norway | Alexander Bolshunov; Russia | Martin Johnsrud Sundby; Norway |
| 2021 Oberstdorf | Alexander Bolshunov (Russia) Russian Ski Federation | Simen Hegstad Krüger; Norway | Hans Christer Holund; Norway |
| 2023 Planica | Simen Hegstad Krüger; Norway | Johannes Høsflot Klæbo; Norway | Sjur Røthe; Norway |
**10 km classic mass start; then 10 km freestyle pursuit**
| 2025 Trondheim | Johannes Høsflot Klæbo; Norway | Martin Løwstrøm Nyenget; Norway | Harald Østberg Amundsen; Norway |

Medal table

| Rank | Nation | Gold | Silver | Bronze | Total |
|---|---|---|---|---|---|
| 1 | Norway | 8 | 6 | 7 | 21 |
| 2 | Russia | 2 | 2 | 3 | 7 |
| 3 | Sweden | 2 | 1 | 1 | 4 |
| 4 | Germany | 1 | 1 | 0 | 2 |
| 4 | Kazakhstan | 1 | 1 | 0 | 2 |
| 4 | Switzerland | 1 | 1 | 0 | 2 |
| 7 | France | 1 | 0 | 0 | 1 |
| 7 | (Russia) Russian Ski Federation | 1 | 0 | 0 | 1 |
| 9 | Italy | 0 | 2 | 4 | 6 |
| 10 | Finland | 0 | 2 | 1 | 3 |
| 11 | Spain | 0 | 1 | 0 | 1 |
| 12 | Canada | 0 | 0 | 1 | 1 |
| Totals (12 entries) | | **17** | **17** | **17** | **51** |

== Individual sprint ==
Debuted: 2001.
Classic style: 2005, 2007, 2013, 2015, 2021, 2023. Free style: 2001, 2003, 2009, 2011, 2017, 2019, 2025.

| Championships | Gold | Silver | Bronze |
|---|---|---|---|
| 2001 Lahti | Tor Arne Hetland; Norway | Cristian Zorzi; Italy | Håvard Solbakken; Norway |
| 2003 Val di Fiemme | Thobias Fredriksson; Sweden | Håvard Bjerkeli; Norway | Tor Arne Hetland; Norway |
| 2005 Oberstdorf | Vasily Rochev; Russia | Tor Arne Hetland; Norway | Thobias Fredriksson; Sweden |
| 2007 Sapporo | Jens Arne Svartedal; Norway | Mats Larsson; Sweden | Eldar Rønning; Norway |
| 2009 Liberec | Ola Vigen Hattestad; Norway | Johan Kjølstad; Norway | Nikolay Morilov; Russia |
| 2011 Oslo | Marcus Hellner; Sweden | Petter Northug; Norway | Emil Jönsson; Sweden |
| 2013 Val di Fiemme | Nikita Kryukov; Russia | Petter Northug; Norway | Alex Harvey; Canada |
| 2015 Falun | Petter Northug; Norway | Alex Harvey; Canada | Ola Vigen Hattestad; Norway |
| 2017 Lahti | Federico Pellegrino; Italy | Sergey Ustiugov; Russia | Johannes Høsflot Klæbo; Norway |
| 2019 Seefeld | Johannes Høsflot Klæbo; Norway | Federico Pellegrino; Italy | Gleb Retivykh; Russia |
| 2021 Oberstdorf | Johannes Høsflot Klæbo; Norway | Erik Valnes; Norway | Håvard Solås Taugbøl; Norway |
| 2023 Planica | Johannes Høsflot Klæbo; Norway | Pål Golberg; Norway | Jules Chappaz; France |
| 2025 Trondheim | Johannes Høsflot Klæbo **(4)**; Norway | Federico Pellegrino; Italy | Lauri Vuorinen; Finland |

Medal table

| Rank | Nation | Gold | Silver | Bronze | Total |
|---|---|---|---|---|---|
| 1 | Norway | 8 | 7 | 6 | 21 |
| 2 | Russia | 2 | 1 | 2 | 5 |
| 2 | Sweden | 2 | 1 | 2 | 5 |
| 4 | Italy | 1 | 3 | 0 | 4 |
| 5 | Canada | 0 | 1 | 1 | 2 |
| 6 | Finland | 0 | 0 | 1 | 1 |
| 6 | France | 0 | 0 | 1 | 1 |
| Totals (7 entries) | | **13** | **13** | **13** | **39** |

== Team sprint ==
Debuted: 2005.
Classic style: 2009, 2011, 2017, 2019, 2025. Free style: 2005, 2007, 2013, 2015, 2021, 2023.

| Championships | Gold | Silver | Bronze |
|---|---|---|---|
| 2005 Oberstdorf | Tore Ruud Hofstad; Tor Arne Hetland; Norway | Jens Filbrich; Axel Teichmann; Germany | Dušan Kožíšek; Martin Koukal; Czech Republic |
| 2007 Sapporo | Renato Pasini; Cristian Zorzi; Italy | Nikolay Morilov; Vasily Rochev; Russia | Milan Šperl; Dušan Kožíšek; Czech Republic |
| 2009 Liberec | Johan Kjølstad; Ola Vigen Hattestad; Norway | Tobias Angerer; Axel Teichmann; Germany | Ville Nousiainen; Sami Jauhojärvi; Finland |
| 2011 Oslo | Devon Kershaw; Alex Harvey; Canada | Petter Northug; Ola Vigen Hattestad; Norway | Alexander Panzhinskiy; Nikita Kryukov; Russia |
| 2013 Val di Flemme | Alexey Petukhov; Nikita Kryukov; Russia | Marcus Hellner; Emil Jönsson; Sweden | Nikolay Chebotko; Alexey Poltoranin; Kazakhstan |
| 2015 Falun | Finn Hågen Krogh; Petter Northug; Norway | Alexey Petukhov; Nikita Kryukov; Russia | Dietmar Nöckler; Federico Pellegrino; Italy |
| 2017 Lahti | Nikita Kryukov (2); Sergey Ustiugov; Russia | Dietmar Nöckler; Federico Pellegrino; Italy | Sami Jauhojärvi; Iivo Niskanen; Finland |
| 2019 Seefeld | Emil Iversen; Johannes Høsflot Klæbo; Norway | Gleb Retivykh; Alexander Bolshunov; Russia | Francesco De Fabiani; Federico Pellegrino; Italy |
| 2021 Oberstdorf | Erik Valnes; Johannes Høsflot Klæbo; Norway | Ristomatti Hakola; Joni Mäki; Finland | Alexander Bolshunov; Gleb Retivykh (Russia) Russian Ski Federation |
| 2023 Planica | Pål Golberg; Johannes Høsflot Klæbo; Norway | Francesco De Fabiani; Federico Pellegrino; Italy | Renaud Jay; Richard Jouve; France |
| 2025 Trondheim | Erik Valnes (2); Johannes Høsflot Klæbo **(4)**; Norway | Ristomatti Hakola; Lauri Vuorinen; Finland | Oskar Svensson; Edvin Anger; Sweden |

Medal table

| Rank | Nation | Gold | Silver | Bronze | Total |
|---|---|---|---|---|---|
| 1 | Norway | 7 | 1 | 0 | 8 |
| 2 | Russia | 2 | 3 | 1 | 6 |
| 3 | Italy | 1 | 2 | 2 | 5 |
| 4 | Canada | 1 | 0 | 0 | 1 |
| 5 | Finland | 0 | 2 | 2 | 4 |
| 6 | Germany | 0 | 2 | 0 | 2 |
| 7 | Sweden | 0 | 1 | 1 | 2 |
| 8 | Czech Republic | 0 | 0 | 2 | 2 |
| 9 | France | 0 | 0 | 1 | 1 |
| 9 | Kazakhstan | 0 | 0 | 1 | 1 |
| 9 | (Russia) Russian Ski Federation | 0 | 0 | 1 | 1 |
| Totals (11 entries) | | **11** | **11** | **11** | **33** |

== Medal table ==
Table updated after the 2025 Championships.

| Rank | Nation | Gold | Silver | Bronze | Total |
|---|---|---|---|---|---|
| 1 | Norway | 74 | 46 | 52 | 172 |
| 2 | Sweden | 38 | 30 | 31 | 99 |
| 3 | Finland | 30 | 32 | 30 | 92 |
| 4 | Russia | 7 | 15 | 12 | 34 |
| 5 | Soviet Union | 7 | 13 | 7 | 27 |
| 6 | Italy | 6 | 11 | 16 | 33 |
| 7 | Kazakhstan | 3 | 2 | 4 | 9 |
| 8 | Germany | 2 | 8 | 7 | 17 |
| 9 | Czechoslovakia | 2 | 5 | 4 | 11 |
| 10 | East Germany | 2 | 3 | 2 | 7 |
| 11 | Estonia | 2 | 2 | 0 | 4 |
| 12 | Canada | 2 | 1 | 2 | 5 |
| 13 | Switzerland | 1 | 3 | 0 | 4 |
| 14 | France | 1 | 2 | 6 | 9 |
| 15 | Czech Republic | 1 | 2 | 2 | 5 |
| 16 | (Russia) Russian Ski Federation | 1 | 2 | 1 | 4 |
| 17 | Austria | 1 | 1 | 2 | 4 |
| 18 | Spain | 1 | 1 | 0 | 2 |
| 19 | Poland | 1 | 0 | 2 | 3 |
| 20 | Belarus | 0 | 1 | 0 | 1 |
| 21 | United States | 0 | 0 | 1 | 1 |
| 21 | West Germany | 0 | 0 | 1 | 1 |
| Totals (22 entries) | | **182** | **180** | **182** | **544** |

== Multiple medalists ==
Boldface denotes active cross-country skiers and highest medal count among all cross-country skiers (including these who not included in these tables) per type.

=== All events ===
| Rank | Cross-country skier | Country | From | To | Gold | Silver | Bronze | Total |
|---|---|---|---|---|---|---|---|---|
| 1 | **Johannes Høsflot Klæbo** | Norway | 2017 | 2025 | **15** | 2 | 1 | **18** |
| 2 | Petter Northug | Norway | 2007 | 2015 | 13 | 3 | – | 16 |
| 3 | Bjørn Dæhlie | Norway | 1991 | 1999 | 9 | 5 | 3 | 17 |
| 4 | Gunde Svan | Sweden | 1985 | 1991 | 7 | 3 | 1 | 11 |
| 5 | Thomas Alsgaard | Norway | 1995 | 2003 | 6 | 2 | 1 | 9 |
| 6 | Klaes Karppinen | Finland | 1934 | 1939 | 5 | 5 | – | 10 |
| 7 | Odd-Bjørn Hjelmeset | Norway | 1999 | 2009 | 5 | – | 3 | 8 |
| 8 | Vladimir Smirnov | Soviet Union; Kazakhstan | 1987 | 1995 | 4 | 4 | 3 | 11 |
| 9 | Torgny Mogren | Sweden | 1987 | 1993 | 4 | 3 | 2 | 9 |
| 9 | Mika Myllylä | Finland | 1995 | 1999 | 4 | 3 | 2 | 9 |
| 9 | Martin Johnsrud Sundby | Norway | 2011 | 2019 | 4 | 3 | 2 | 9 |

=== Individual events ===
| Rank | Cross-country skier | Country | From | To | Gold | Silver | Bronze | Total |
|---|---|---|---|---|---|---|---|---|
| 1 | **Johannes Høsflot Klæbo** | Norway | 2017 | 2025 | **7** | 2 | 1 | 10 |
| 2 | Petter Northug | Norway | 2009 | 2015 | **7** | 2 | – | 9 |
| 3 | Bjørn Dæhlie | Norway | 1991 | 1999 | 5 | **4** | **3** | **12** |
| 4 | Gunde Svan | Sweden | 1985 | 1991 | 5 | 2 | – | 7 |
| 5 | Vladimir Smirnov | Soviet Union; Kazakhstan | 1989 | 1995 | 4 | 3 | **3** | 10 |
| 6 | Mika Myllylä | Finland | 1995 | 1999 | 4 | 2 | 2 | 8 |
| 7 | Per Elofsson | Sweden | 2001 | 2003 | 3 | – | – | 3 |
| 8 | Veikko Hakulinen | Finland | 1954 | 1958 | 2 | 3 | – | 5 |
| 8 | Thomas Wassberg | Sweden | 1982 | 1987 | 2 | 3 | – | 5 |
| 10 | **Simen Hegstad Krüger** | Norway | 2021 | 2025 | 2 | 2 | 2 | 6 |
| 10 | Torgny Mogren | Sweden | 1987 | 1993 | 2 | 2 | 2 | 6 |

== Best performers by country ==
Here are listed most successful cross-country skiers in the history of each medal-winning national team – according to the gold-first ranking system and by total number of World Championships medals (one skier if he holds national records in both categories or few skiers if these national records belongs to different persons). If the total number of medals is identical, the gold, silver and bronze medals are used as tie-breakers (in that order). If all numbers are the same, the skiers get the same placement and are sorted by the alphabetic order.

| Country | Cross-country skier | From | To | Gold | Silver | Bronze | Total |
|---|---|---|---|---|---|---|---|
| Norway | **Johannes Høsflot Klæbo** | 2017 | 2025 | **15** | 2 | 1 | **18** |
| Sweden | Gunde Svan | 1985 | 1991 | 7 | 3 | 1 | 11 |
| Finland | Klaes Karppinen | 1934 | 1939 | 5 | 5 | – | 10 |
| Soviet Union; Kazakhstan | Vladimir Smirnov | 1987 | 1995 | 4 | 4 | 3 | 11 |
| Kazakhstan (as such only) | Vladimir Smirnov | 1993 | 1995 | 3 | 2 | 2 | 7 |
| Russia (as such only) | Nikita Kryukov (by the gold first ranking system) | 2011 | 2017 | 3 | 1 | 1 | 5 |
| Russia (as such only) | Sergey Ustiugov (by total number of medals) | 2013 | 2019 | 2 | 4 | 1 | 7 |
| Russia; Russian Ski Federation | Nikita Kryukov (by the gold first ranking system) | 2011 | 2017 | 3 | 1 | 1 | 5 |
| Russia; Russian Ski Federation | **Alexander Bolshunov** (by total number of medals) | 2019 | 2021 | 1 | **6** | 1 | 8 |
| Germany | Axel Teichmann | 2003 | 2011 | 2 | 5 | 1 | 8 |
| East Germany | Gerhard Grimmer | 1970 | 1974 | 2 | 3 | 1 | 6 |
| Canada | Alex Harvey | 2011 | 2017 | 2 | 1 | 2 | 5 |
| Estonia | Andrus Veerpalu | 1999 | 2009 | 2 | 1 | – | 3 |
| Soviet Union (as such only) | Vladimir Kuzin & Vyacheslav Vedenin (by the gold first ranking system) | 1954; 1970 | 1954; 1970 | 2; 2 | 1; 1 | – – | 3; 3 |
| Soviet Union (as such only) | Vladimir Smirnov (by total number of medals) | 1987 | 1991 | 1 | 2 | 1 | 4 |
| Italy | Federico Pellegrino | 2015 | 2025 | 1 | 4 | 2 | 7 |
| Czechoslovakia | František Donth | 1925 | 1927 | 1 | 2 | 1 | 4 |
| (Russia) Russian Ski Federation (as such only) | **Alexander Bolshunov** | 2021 | 2021 | 1 | 2 | 1 | 4 |
| Switzerland | Dario Cologna* | 2013 | 2015 | 1 | 2 | – | 3 |
| Austria | Alois Stadlober (by the gold first ranking system) | 1999 | 1999 | 1 | 1 | – | 2 |
| Austria | Mikhail Botvinov (by total number of medals, including 1 bronze medal won for Russia) | 1993 | 1999 | 1 | – | 2 | 3 |
| Spain | Johann Mühlegg* | 2001 | 2001 | 1 | 1 | – | 2 |
| Czech Republic | Martin Koukal | 2003 | 2005 | 1 | – | 1 | 2 |
| Poland | Józef Łuszczek | 1978 | 1978 | 1 | – | 1 | 2 |
| France | Vincent Vittoz (by the gold first ranking system) | 2005 | 2005 | 1 | – | – | 1 |
| France | Maurice Manificat (by total number of medals) | 2015 | 2021 | – | 1 | 3 | 4 |
| Belarus | Leanid Karneyenka* | 2007 | 2007 | – | 1 | – | 1 |
| United States | Bill Koch* | 1982 | 1982 | – | – | 1 | 1 |
| West Germany | Walter Demel* | 1966 | 1966 | – | – | 1 | 1 |

An asterisk (*) marks athletes who are the only representatives of their respective countries to win a medal.

== Multiple medals at one championship ==
- 6 medals:
  - out of 6 possible:
    - 2025 Johannes Høsflot Klæbo (Norway)
- 5 medals:
  - out of 5 possible:
    - 1997 Bjørn Dæhlie (Norway)
  - out of 6 possible:
    - 2011 Petter Northug (Norway)
    - 2023 Johannes Høsflot Klæbo (Norway)
    - 2017 Sergey Ustiugov (Russia)
- 4 medals:
  - out of 4 possible:
    - 1954 Veikko Hakulinen (Finland)
    - 1987 Thomas Wassberg (Sweden)
  - out of 5 possible:
    - 1999 Mika Myllylä (Finland)
    - 1993 Bjørn Dæhlie (Norway)
    - 1995 Vladimir Smirnov (Kazakhstan) (all four individual)
    - 1991 Gunde Svan (Sweden)
    - 1995 Bjørn Dæhlie (Norway)
    - 1997 Mika Myllylä (Finland)
  - out of 6 possible:
    - 2015 Petter Northug (Norway)
    - 2023 Pål Golberg (Norway)
    - 2021 Alexander Bolshunov (Russia)
    - 2019 Alexander Bolshunov (Russia)
- 3 medals:
  - out of 3 possible:
    - 1935 Klaes Karppinen (Finland)
    - 1941 Jussi Kurikkala (Finland) (1941 Championship subsequently cancelled)
    - 1933 Hjalmar Bergström (Sweden)
    - 1939 Klaes Karppinen (Finland)
    - 1950 Enar Josefsson (Sweden)
    - 1937 Pekka Niemi (Finland)
    - 1941 Alfred Dahlqvist (Sweden) (1941 Championship subsequently cancelled)
  - out of 4 possible:
    - 1966 Gjermund Eggen (Norway)
    - 1954 Vladimir Kuzin (Soviet Union)
    - 1962 Assar Rönnlund (Sweden)
    - 1970 Vyacheslav Vedenin (Soviet Union)
    - 1974 Gerhard Grimmer (East Germany)
    - 1958 Sixten Jernberg (Sweden)
    - 1985 Gunde Svan (Sweden)
    - 1935 Oddbjørn Hagen (Norway) (2 of 3 medals in cross country + one in Nordic Combined)
    - 1954 Arvo Viitanen (Finland)
    - 1958 Veikko Hakulinen (Finland)
    - 1966 Eero Mäntyranta (Finland)
    - 1982 Lars Erik Eriksen (Norway)
    - 1985 Ove Aunli (Norway)
    - 1958 Pavel Kolchin (Soviet Union)
    - 1970 Gerhard Grimmer (East Germany)
    - 1985 Maurilio De Zolt (Italy)
- 2 medals out of 2 possible:
    - 1925 Otakar Německý (Czech Republic) (one medal of two possible in cross country + one in Nordic Combined)
    - 1926 Matti Raivio (Finland)
    - 1927 John Lindgren (Sweden)
    - 1931 Johan Grøttumsbråten (Norway) (one medal of two possible in cross country + one in Nordic Combined)
    - 1925 František Donth (Czech Republic)
    - 1929 Veli Saarinen (Finland)
    - 1929 Anselm Knuuttila (Finland)
    - 1930 Arne Rustadstuen (Norway)
    - 1926 Tauno Lappalainen (Finland)
    - 1927 František Donth (Czech Republic)

== See also ==
- Cross-country skiing at the Winter Olympics
- Cross-country skiing World Cup medalists
- List of Olympic medalists in cross-country skiing (men)
- List of Olympic medalists in cross-country skiing (women)

== External links and references ==
- https://web.archive.org/web/20050305075135/http://www.sports123.com/cco/index.html
