= Compagnoni =

Compagnoni is an Italian surname. Notable people with the surname include:

- Achille Compagnoni (1914–2009), Italian mountain climber and skier
- Angelo Compagnoni (1921–2018), an Italian politician
- Aristide Compagnoni (b. 1910), Italian cross-country skier
- Deborah Compagnoni (b. 1970), Italian alpine skier
- Matteo Compagnoni (b. 1991), Italian short track speed skater
- Ottavio Compagnoni (b. 1926), Italian cross-country skier
- Giuseppe Compagnoni (1754–1833), Italian constitutionalist, writer and journalist
- Severino Compagnoni (b. 1917), Italian cross-country skier
- Sforza Compagnoni (1584–1640), Italian author and painter
