= Brännström =

Brännström is a Swedish surname that may refer to:

- Anders Brännström (born 1957), Swedish Army major general
- Brasse Brännström (real name Lars Erik Brännström; 1945–2014), Swedish actor
- Erik Brännström, Swedish ice hockey defenceman
- Gösta Brännström (1926–1997), Swedish sprinter
- Julia Brännström Nordtug (born 1991), Norwegian politician
- Katarina Brännström (born 1950), Swedish politician
- Mauritz Brännström (1918–2006), Swedish cross-country skier
- Moni Nilsson-Brännström (born 1955), Swedish author
