= Alberto Jammaron =

Italian cross-country skier

Medal record

Men's cross-country skiing

World Championships
Bronze medal – third place	1939 Zakopane	4 x 10 km
Bronze medal – third place	1941 Cortina d'Ampezzo	4 x 10 km

Alberto Jammaron (April 25, 1915 – November 4, 2016) was an Italian cross-country skier who competed in the 1930s. From 1945 to 1947 he was also president of the Sci Club La Thuile-Rutor.

== Selected results ==
- 1937: 3rd, member of the Bronze team at the 5th Trofeo Mezzalama
- 1938: 6th, FIS Nordic World Ski Championships 4 x 10 km relay, together with Giulio Gerardi, Goffredo Baur and Vincenzo Demez
- 1939: 3rd, FIS Nordic World Ski Championships 4 x 10 km relay, together with Aristide Compagnoni, Severino Compagnoni and Goffredo Baur
- 1940: 1st, Italian men's championships of cross-country skiing, 18 km
- 1941:
  - 3rd, FIS Nordic World Ski Championships 4 x 10 km relay, together with Aristide Compagnoni, Severino Compagnoni and Giulio Gherardi
  - 2nd, Italian men's championships of cross-country skiing, 18 km
