= Donth =

Donth is a surname. Notable people with the surname include:

- František Donth (or Franz Donth) (1896–1976), Czech Ethnic German Nordic skier
- Michael Donth (born 1967), German politician
