= Hovde =

Hovde is a surname. Notable people with the surname include:

- Arne Hovde (1914–1935), Norwegian ski jumper
- Carl Hovde (1926–2009), American educator
- Dag Ivar Hovde (b. 1973), Norwegian biathlete
- Frederick L. Hovde (1908–1983), American university president
- Jonny Hovde, Norwegian handball player
- Kristian Hovde (1903–1969), Norwegian cross-country skier
- Liv Hovde (b. 2005), American tennis player
- William J. Hovde (1917–1996), United States Air Force colonel
