= Confortola =

Confortola is an Italian surname and may refer to:

- Antonella Confortola (born 1975), Italian cross-country skier
- Erminio Confortola (1901–1934), Italian skier and mountain guide, competitor in the 1928 Winter Olympics (military ski patrol)
- Silvio Confortola (1910–2003), Italian cross-country skier and competitor in the 1948 Winter Olympics
- Yuri Confortola (born 1986), Italian speed skater and competitor at the Winter Olympics 2006, 2010, 2014, 2018 and 2022
