= Palazzo Bonelli (Barletta) =

Medieval palace in Barletta, Italy

Coordinates: 41.3201°N 16.2832°E

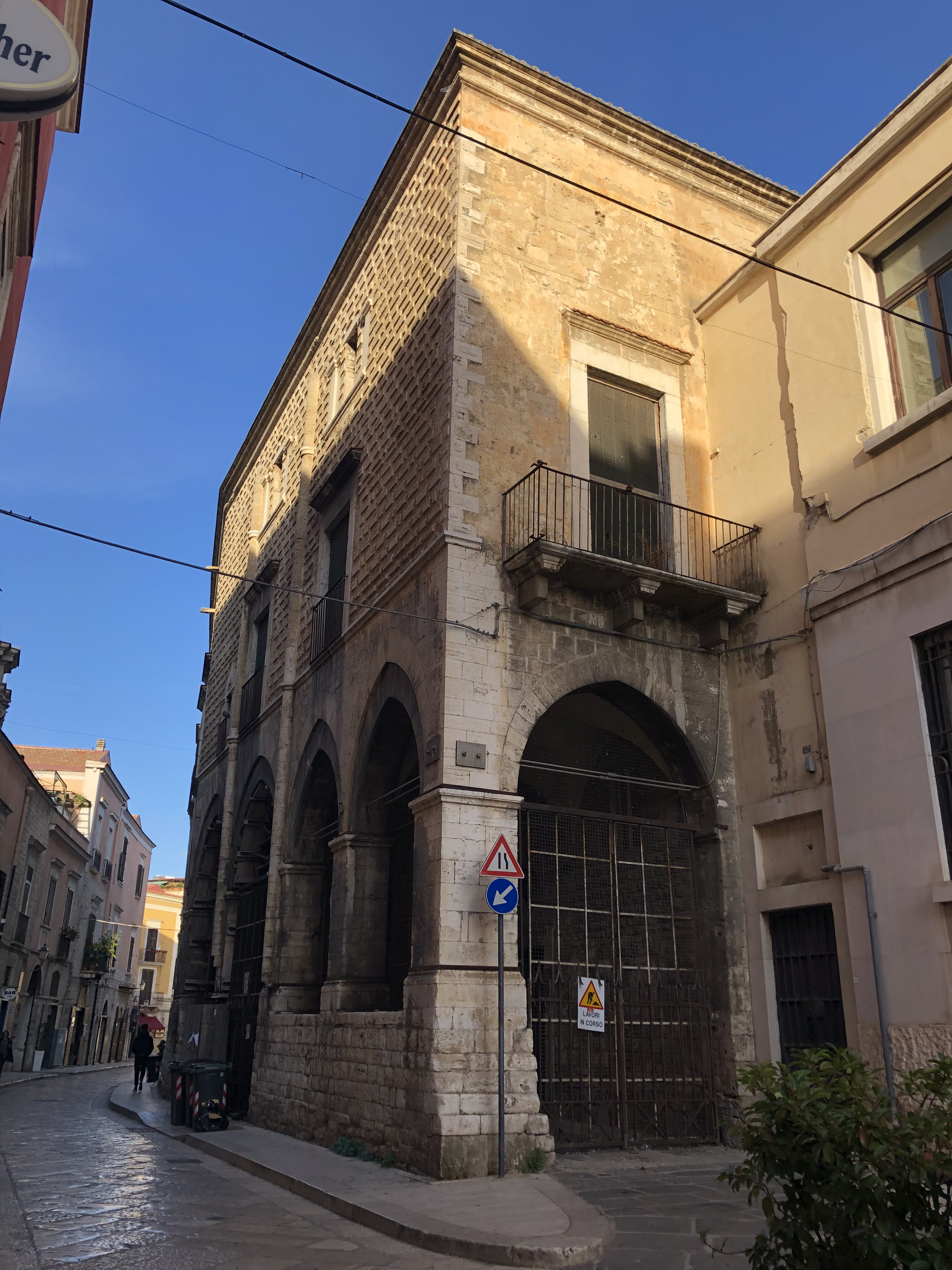
- Interactive map of the Palazzo Bonelli area

General information
- Status: Not in use
- Architectural style: Gothic
- Location: Barletta, Corso Giuseppe Garibaldi, 220, Italy
- Construction started: 1324

Palazzo Bonelli is a medieval palace in Barletta, Italy, located at the junction of important urban thoroughfares and representing a significant example of medieval civil architecture. It is one of the very rare surviving examples of private medieval civil architecture in Apulia and in southern Italy that has reached the present day in almost intact condition.

== History ==
Deliberately located in a transit area of the ancient city, the palace was built in 1324 by Guala d'Yserio. After d'Yserio's death, the building became the property of the Della Marra family, who remained its owners until the seventeenth century. In 1326 d'Yserio had married Adolisia Della Marra; since the couple had no children, Adolisia was designated as heir upon his death.

Studies on this influential and numerous family provide the limited historical information known about the building. Palazzo Bonelli appears to have been the first residence of the Della Marra family. Around 1633 they moved to Via Cialdini, into the Renaissance palace that still bears their name and that today houses the Pinacoteca De Nittis.

The Della Marra family, among the oldest in Barletta, reached the height of its power between the fourteenth and sixteenth centuries. Their influence was such that the district where the palace stood was called "Marrensium", meaning "of the Della Marra". At their request, near the residence and on the site where a small square stands today, a church dedicated to Saint Ruggero, bishop of Canne, was built (later destroyed in subsequent centuries).

There is no information about the events affecting the building between 1362 and 1582. Documentary evidence reappears in 1583, when the palace was recorded as belonging to the Visco family. From that moment onward, the property underwent several rapid changes of ownership. In 1608 it was confiscated from Alessandro Visco and pledged to Vincenzo Gentile, who in April 1616 transferred it to the spouses Antonio De Paredes and Camilla Marulli. In 1685 it was purchased by the brothers Cesare and Filippo Bonelli, members of a family of Norman origin that had settled in Barletta in the twelfth century.

The Bonelli family retained ownership of the palace until the 1980s, when the entire complex was sold to the Cassa di Risparmio di Puglia, which initiated an initial restoration project that was never completed due to the subsequent sale of the building to the Municipality of Barletta. After a period of complete abandonment, the structure underwent significant structural works aimed at reinforcing and stabilizing the building. At present, it still has no designated use and is not open to visitors.

== Description ==
=== Exterior ===
An analysis of the structures, which have undergone numerous architectural transformations over the centuries, shows that the palace is currently the result of the aggregation of several building sections, the oldest of which probably date back to the 13th century. The most significant construction phase, characterized by works commissioned by the Della Marra family, can be dated between the 14th and 15th centuries. Later, between the 17th and 19th centuries, the Bonelli family enlarged the palace, adapting it to the architectural styles and tastes of the time.

The façade consists of two distinct parts. The lower section features a long portico, now closed by gates but once open and accessible. It is composed of ten arches along the façade facing Corso Garibaldi and one arch on each of the sides projecting toward the street. The north-eastern side is completely closed and displays two late single-light windows. The remaining openings are partially walled up to a height of about one and a half meters, with the exception of the large arches corresponding to the two entrance portals located at street numbers 216 and 218.

Although it appears relatively uniform—also due to the narrowness of the street that prevents a full view—the portico actually presents arches of different heights and widths, all constructed with a double archivolt, the outer one slightly projecting. The pillars supporting them also vary in size, particularly the fifth and sixth from the north-east, which are thinner and lack the internal projection found in the other pillars.

The main façade opens onto Corso Garibaldi and features a Gothic-style portico articulated by twelve bays with pointed arches and double archivolts resting on square pillars. Access to the palace is provided through two portals: the first adjacent to the initial bays and the second positioned further to the right. The upper floor, attributable to interventions carried out in the modern period, displays a series of lintelled windows and preserves traces of the medieval structure, visible in a small single-light window with a lunette arch and in an opening framed by an aedicule-like profile.

=== Interior ===
The interior is composed of numerous rooms arranged around courtyards, some of which preserve visible remains of the refined medieval decoration. Among the sculptural elements are the carved lunette of the portal on the piano nobile, depicting a lush plant with leaves and fruits, several capitals comparable to the crochet type with hooked foliage, and elegant mullioned windows with trefoil arches and delicate vegetal carvings.
