= Macerata Cathedral =

Cathedral in Macerata, Marche, Italy

Coordinates: 43°18′03″N 13°27′23″E

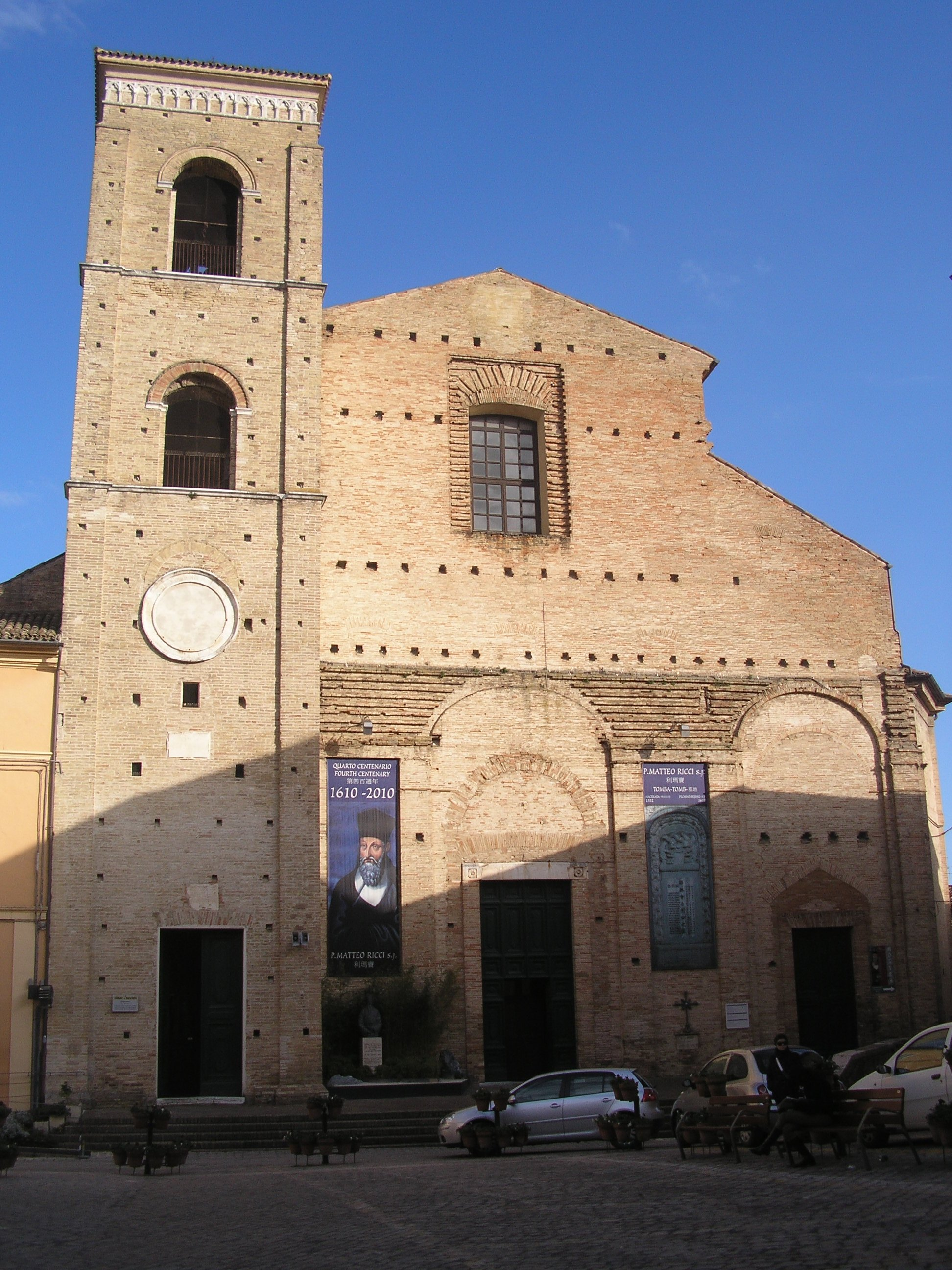
Façade.

Macerata Cathedral (Italian: Cattedrale di Macerata; Duomo di Macerata; Cattedrale di San Giuliano) is a Renaissance-style, Roman Catholic cathedral dedicated to the St Julian in the town of Macerata, province of Macerata, region of Marche, Italy.

== History ==
The Cathedral was built in 1459-1464 to designs by Cosimo Morelli; it underwent reconstruction in 1771. The façade and the adjacent square bell tower (1478), which projects forward into the piazza, remain unfinished in brick. The tower's design is attributed to Marino di Marco Cedrino.

The interior was decorated in 1771 in neoclassical style. It is characterized by large twin columns, which divide the three naves and the cupola. The main altarpiece depicts St Julian intercedes with the Madonna and Child to ease the plague(1786) by Cristoforo Unterberger. Below the second story choir loft are canvases (1602) by Filippo Bellini. The spandrels of the apse were painted with the Religion and the Theologic virtues (1938) by Silvio Galimberti.

On the first altar on the right (erected by the Ferri family) houses a canvas depicting the Transfer of the Keys to St Peter by an anonymous Bolognese artist. The second chapel on the right has a depiction of the Madonna between Saints Sebastian and Andrea (1600) by Andrea Boscoli. In the right transept there is a mosaic depicting St Michael the Archangel (1628) made by Giambattista Calandra, originally for the St Peter's Basilica in the Vtican. Along the left transept is the Chapel of the Holy Sacrament (1932) in a neo-rococo style by Giuseppe Rossi with the dome frescoed by Pavisa. The third altar on the right (dei Compagnoni) has a canvas with a depiction of San Carlo Borromeo (1790) by Vincenzo Martini.

In the first chapel on the left there is the baptismal font, and a fragment of a large wooden model (17th century) which reproduced the project of Michelangelo for the Vatican Basilica.

The sacristy conserves a triptych of the Madonna and Child with Saints Anthony Abbot and Giuliano (1369) by Allegretto Nuzi; a Madonna in Glory between Saints Giuliano and Anthony of Padua by Vincenzo Pagani; a Madonna and Child with Saints John the Baptist, Sebastian, James the Major (1574) by Gaspare Gasparini; a Birth of Mary by Sforza Compagnoni; a Pietà by Filippo Bellini; a Miracle of St Gregory by Andrea Sacchi designed for the Gregorian chapel in St Peter's Basilica in the Vatican. On the altar of the chapel of San Giuliano is a canvas depicting Julian before an angel who announces his coming death (1738) by Francesco Mancini.

The organ in the right choir was built by Gaetano Callido in 1790. Below the church is a crypt with three altars. The church is custodian of the relics of St Julian.
