= Lars Jonsson =

Lars Jonsson or Jönsson may refer to:

- Lars Jonsson (illustrator) (born 1952), ornithological illustrator
- Lars Jonsson (ice hockey) (born 1982), Swedish ice hockey player
- Lars Theodor Jonsson (1903–1998), Swedish cross country skier
- Lars Jönsson (tennis) (born 1970), Swedish tennis player
- Lars Jönsson (film producer), Swedish film producer
