= FIS Nordic World Ski Championships 1941 =

International Nordic skiing competition

- Host city: Cortina d'Ampezzo
- Country: Italy
- Events: 5
- Opening: 1 February 1941
- Closing: 10 February 1941

The FIS Nordic World Ski Championships 1941 took place February 1–10, 1941 in Cortina d'Ampezzo, Italy. The previous championships of 1940 were scheduled for Norway, but were cancelled in the wake of Germany's invasion of Norway during World War II. At the 1946 meeting in Pau, France, the FIS declared this a non-event because of the limited number of competitors. Medals were awarded in this event, but not counted in the overall FIS Nordic World Ski Championships as a result.

== Men's cross country ==
=== 18 km ===
Position	Athlete	Time
1	Alfred Dahlqvist (SWE)	1:05:25
2	Juho 'Jussi' Kurikkala (FIN)	1:07:35
3	Lauri Silvennoinen (FIN)	1:08:13

=== 50 km ===
Position	Athlete	Time
1	Juho 'Jussi' Kurikkala (FIN)	3:36:35
2	Mauritz Brännström (SWE)	3:38:17
3	Alfred Dahlqvist (SWE)	3:41:41

=== 4 × 10 km relay ===
Position	Team	Time
1	Finland (Martti Lauronen, Juho 'Jussi' Kurikkala, Lauri Silvennoinen, Eino Olkinuora)	2:31:07
2	Sweden (Carl Pahlin, Donald Johansson, Nils Östensson, Alfred Dahlqvist)	2:32:15
3	Italy (Aristide Compagnoni, Severino Compagnoni, Alberto Jammaron, Giulio Gerardi)	2:33:50

== Men's Nordic combined ==
=== Individual ===
Position	Athlete	Points
1	Gustav 'Gustl' Berauer (GER)	431.8
2	Pauli Salonen (FIN)	414.8
3	Josef Gstrein (GER)	406.2

Berauer was from Czechoslovakia while Gstrein was from Austria, but both competed for Germany after the Nazis occupied their respective countries in 1938.

== Men's ski jumping ==
=== Individual large hill ===
Position	Athlete	Points
1	Paavo Vierto (FIN)	221.5
2	Leo Laakso (FIN)	220.5
3	Sven Selånger (SWE)	218.3

== Military patrol competition ==
A military patrol competition, 25 km cross-country skiing and rifle shooting, was also held outside of the official FIS Nordic World Ski Championships.

Position	Team	Time
1	Sweden (Wilhelm Hjukström, Martin Matsbo, Nils Östensson, Gösta Andersson)	2:13:21
2	Germany (?, ?, ?, ?)	2:20:17
3	Italy (?, ?, ?, ?)	2:23:55

== Medal table ==
Rank	Nation	Gold	Silver	Bronze	Total
1	Finland (FIN)	3	3	1	7
2	Sweden (SWE)	1	2	2	5
3	Germany (GER)	1	0	1	2
4	Italy (ITA)	0	0	1	1
Totals (4 entries)		5	5	5	15
