= Severino Compagnoni =

Italian cross-country skier

Medal record

Men's cross country skiing

World Championships
Bronze medal – third place	1939 Zakopane	4 x 10 km
Bronze medal – third place	1941 Cortina d'Ampezzo	4 x 10 km

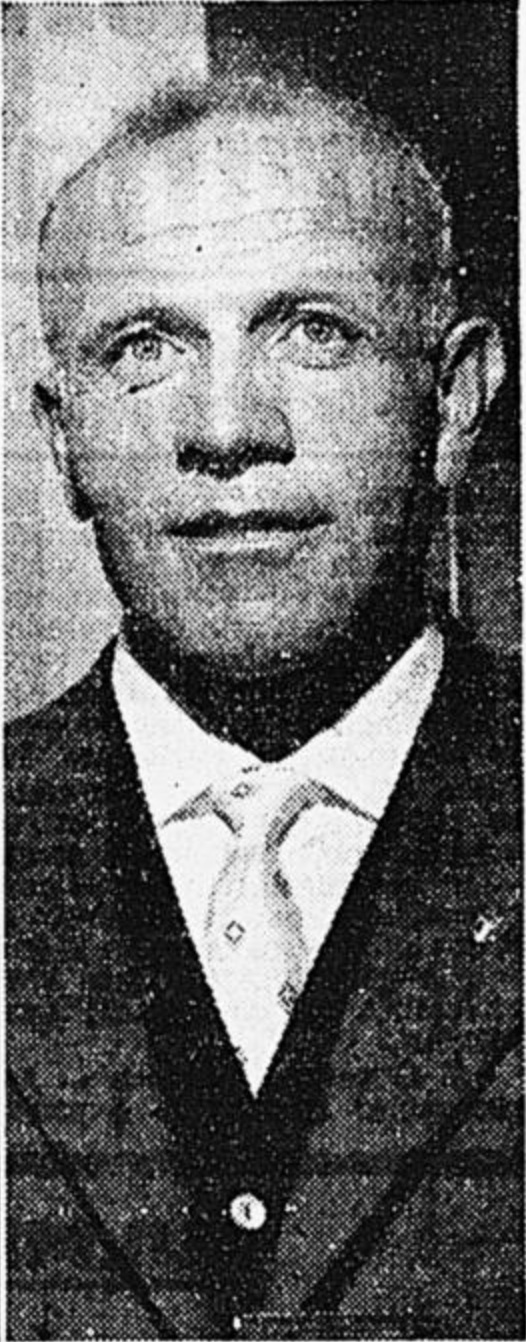
Severino Compagnoni

Severino Compagnoni (4 February 1914 – 1 September 2006) was an Italian cross-country skier who competed from the 1930s to the 1950s. Compagnoni was the brother of the skiers Aristide and Ottavio Compagnoni.

== Selected results ==
Severino won two bronze medals in the 4 x 10 km at the FIS Nordic World Ski Championships, in 1939 together with his brother Aristide, Gottfried Baur and Alberto Jammeron, and in 1941 with Giulio Gerardi instead of Baur.

At the 1948 Winter Olympics he was a member of the Italian relay team (together with Vincenzo Perruchon, Silvio Confortola and Rizzieri Rodeghiero) which finished sixth in the 4x10 km relay competition. In the 18 km event he finished 22nd. He also competed in the 1952 Winter Olympics in Oslo, finishing 18th in the 50 km event.

Further notable results were:

- 1937: 3rd, Italian men's championships of cross-country skiing, 18 km
- 1941: 1st, Italian men's championships of cross-country skiing, 18 km
- 1942: 1st, Italian men's championships of cross-country skiing, 18 km
- 1943: 2nd, Italian men's championships of cross-country skiing, 18 km
- 1946: 1st, Italian men's championships of cross-country skiing, 18 km
- 1946: 1st, Italian men's championships of cross-country skiing, 50 km
- 1947: 3rd, Italian men's championships of cross-country skiing, 18 km
- 1950: 3rd, Italian men's championships of cross-country skiing, 18 km
- 1952: 3rd, Italian men's championships of cross-country skiing, 18 km
