= Allan Karlsson =

Allan Karlsson or Carlsson may refer to:

- Allan Karlsson (skier) (1911–1991), Swedish cross country skier
- Allan Karlsson (footballer), Swedish former footballer
- Allan Karlsson, fictitional character in the comic novel The Accidental Further Adventures of the Hundred-Year-Old Man
- Allan Carlsson (boxer)
- Allan Carlsson (cyclist)

== See also ==
- Allan C. Carlson, historian
