= Josef Německý =

Czechoslovak cross-country skier (1900–1943)

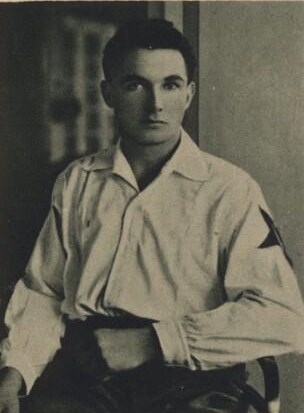
- Německý in 1928

Personal information
- Born: 6 December 1900 Nové Město na Moravě, Bohemia Austria-Hungary
- Died: 10 June 1943 (aged 42) Nové Město na Moravě, Protectorate of Bohemia and Moravia

Sport
- Sport: Skiing

Josef Německý (6 December 1900 – 10 June 1943) was a Czech cross-country skier who competed for Czechoslovakia in the 1924 Winter Olympics and in the 1928 Winter Olympics.

He was born in Nové Město na Moravě. He was the older brother of Otakar Německý.

In 1924, he finished 17th in the 50 kilometre event at the Chamonix Olympics. Four years later he finished eleventh in the 50 kilometre competition at the St. Moritz Games.
