= Franz Wende =

German Czechoslovak ski jumper

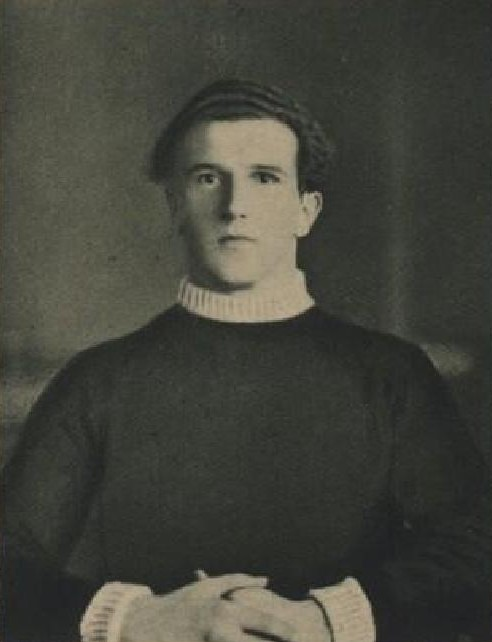
- Franz Wende in 1928

Medal record

Men's Nordic skiing

Representing Czechoslovakia

World Championships
| Bronze medal – third place | 1925 Johannisbad | Individual large hill |
| Bronze medal – third place | 1927 Cortina d'Ampezzo | Nordic combined |

Franz Wende, also in Czech František Wende (3 June 1904 in Svoboda nad Úpou - 1968 in Bad Harzburg) was an ethnic German Czechoslovak ski jumper and Nordic combined skier who has competed in the 1920s. He won two bronze medals at the FIS Nordic World Ski Championships in ski jumping (1925) and Nordic combined (1927). He also competed in the individual event at the 1924 Winter Olympics.

Wende and other three Ethnic German sportspeople, members of the Hauptverband Deutscher Wintersportvereine in der ČSR, represented Czechoslovakia at the first Winter Olympics in Chamonix.
