= Bertil Carlsson (skier) =

Swedish ski jumper

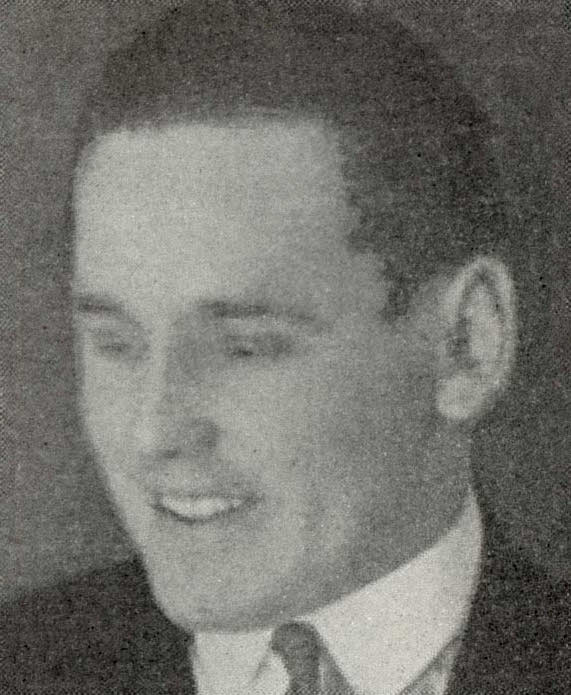
- Bertil Carlsson by the late 1920's

Personal information
- Born: 25 August 1903 Hägernäs, Stockholm, Sweden
- Died: 26 November 1953 (aged 50) Stockholm, Sweden

Sport
- Sport: Ski jumping
- Club: Djurgårdens IF, Stockholm
Medal record
Representing Sweden
World Championships
Bronze medal – third place	1927 Cortina d'Ampezzo	Large hill

Ragnar Alfred Bertil Carlsson (25 August 1903 – 26 November 1953) was a Swedish ski jumper who won a bronze medal in the individual large hill at the 1927 World Championships. Next year he finished tenth in the normal hill at the 1928 Winter Olympics. The 1928 Olympics was his first.

He won the Swedish Championship four times in the ski jumping team events (1926, 1927, 1930).

Carlsson represented Djurgårdens IF.
