= Wilhelm Dick =

German-Czech ski jumper (1897–1980)

Personal information
- Born: 10 September 1897 Vejprty, Bohemia, Austria-Hungary
- Died: 1980 (aged 82–83) Wermelskirchen, West Germany
Medal record
Men's ski jumping
Representing Czechoslovakia
World Championships
Gold medal – first place	1925 Johannisbad	Individual large hill
Silver medal – second place	1927 Cortina d'Ampezzo	Individual large hill

Wilhelm Josef Dick (10 September 1897 – 1980) was a German-Czech ski jumper who competed for Czechoslovakia and later Germany in the 1920s. He won two ski jumping medals at the FIS Nordic World Ski Championships with a gold in 1925 and a silver in 1927.

At the 1926 FIS Nordic World Ski Championships he competed for Germany under the name Willy Dick.

He was a Sudeten German. After the expulsion of Germans from Czechoslovakia after World War II he lived in Garmisch-Partenkirchen and in 1952 he moved to Wermelskirchen in North Rhine-Westphalia, where he died in 1980.
