= Andreas Brännström (politician) =

Norwegian politician (born 1994)

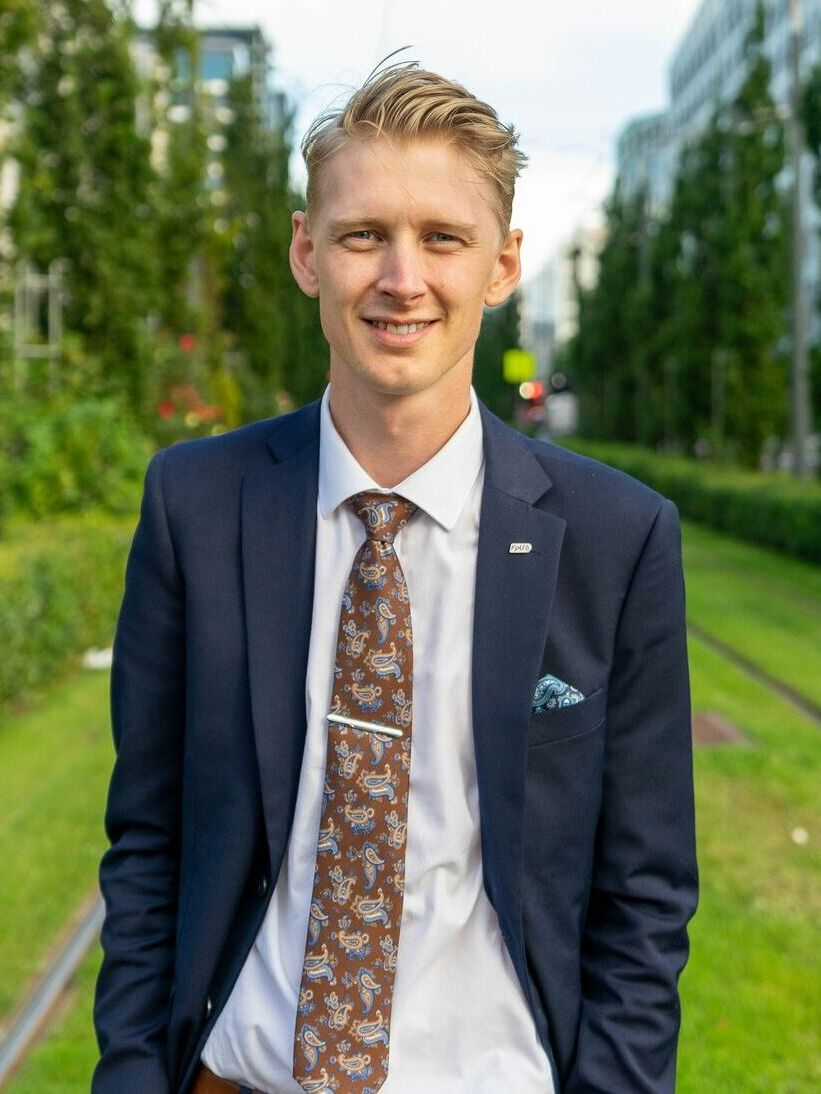
- Brännström in 2020

Chairman of the Progress Party's Youth
- In office 22 August 2020 – 10 April 2022
- Preceded by: Bjørn-Kristian Svendsrud
- Succeeded by: Simen Velle

Personal details
- Born: 9 February 1994 (age 32)
- Party: Progress Party (since 2010)
- Relatives: Julia Brännström Nordtug (sister)

Andreas Simon Brännström (born 9 February 1994) is a Swedish-born Norwegian politician serving as deputy mayor of Sarpsborg since 2023. From 2020 to 2022, he served as chairman of the Progress Party's Youth. From 2018 to 2020, he served as deputy chairman of the Progress Party's Youth. He is the brother of Julia Brännström Nordtug.
