= John Wikström =

Swedish cross-country skier

Medal record

Men's cross-country skiing

Representing Sweden

World Championships
Silver medal – second place	1927 Cortina d'Ampezzo	50 km

John Wikström (May 21, 1903 – February 5, 1991) was a Swedish cross-country skier who competed in the 1920s. He won a silver medal at the 1927 FIS Nordic World Ski Championships in the 50 km event.

== Cross-country skiing results ==
All results are sourced from the International Ski Federation (FIS).

=== World Championships ===
- 1 medal – (1 silver)

Year	Age	18 km	50 km	4 × 10 km relay
1927	23	4	Silver	—N/a
1934	30	—	5	—
