= Henry Ljungmann =

Norwegian ski jumper

Medal record

Men's ski jumping

World Championships
| Silver medal – second place | 1925 Johannisbad | Individual large hill |

Henry Ljungmann (born 3 December 1897, date of death unknown) was a Norwegian ski jumper who has competed in the 1920s. He won a silver medal in the individual large hill at the 1925 FIS Nordic World Ski Championships in Johannisbad.
