= Herbert Leupold =

German cross-country skier and biathlete

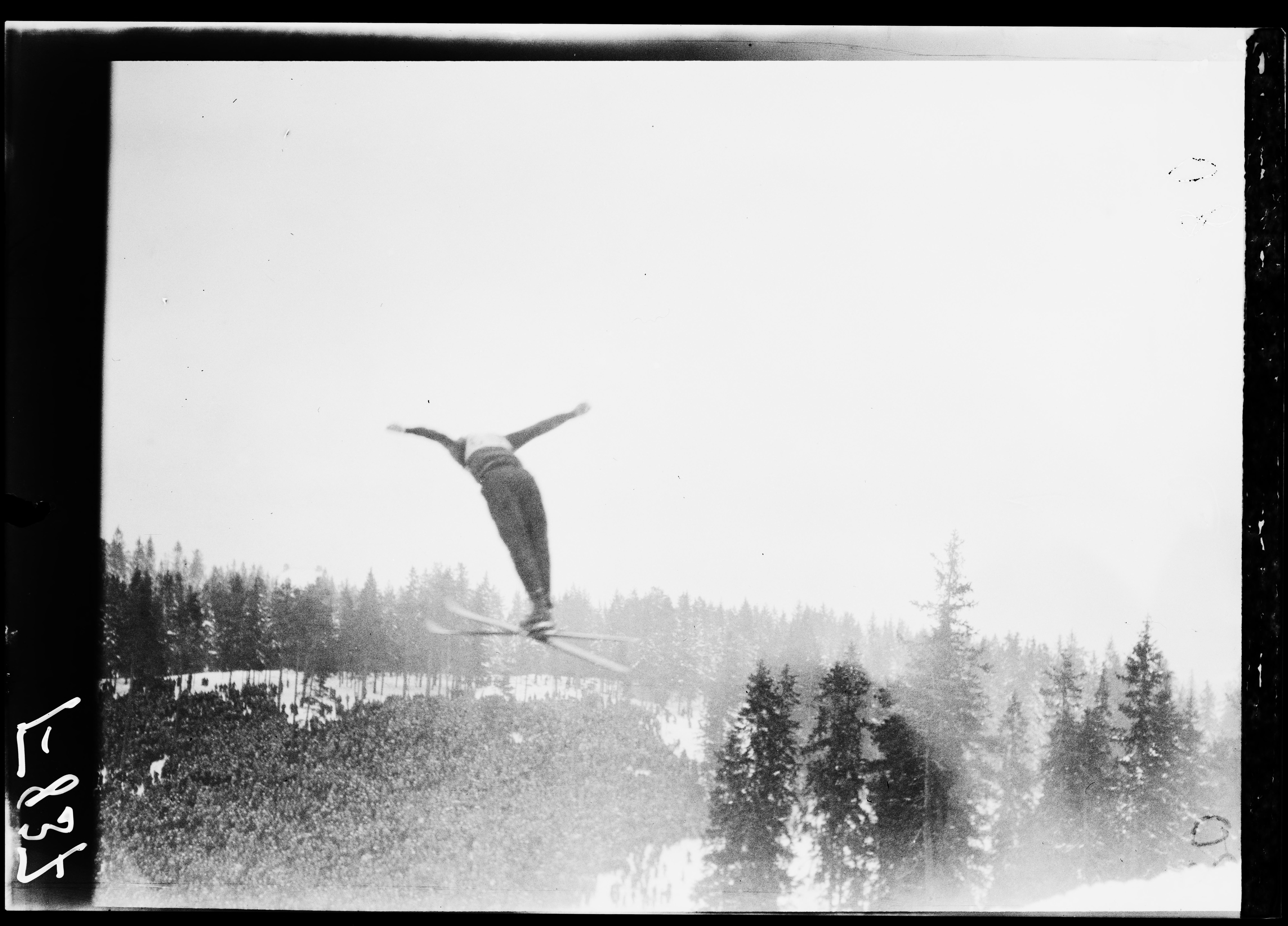

Personal information
- Born: 20 June 1908 Wüstewaltersdorf, German Empire
- Died: 22 December 1942 (aged 34) Navaginskaya, Krasnodar Krai, Soviet Union

Sport
- Sport: Skiing
Medal record
Men's cross country skiing
World Championships
Silver medal – second place	1934 Sollefteå	4 x 10 km

Herbert Leupold (20 June 1908 – 22 December 1942) was a German cross country skier and biathlete who competed in the 1930s.

Leupold was born in Wüstewaltersdorf. He was killed during World War II in Navaginskaya, Krasnodar Krai.

Leupold won a silver medal in the 4 x 10 km at the 1934 FIS Nordic World Ski Championships in Sollefteå.

At the 1936 Winter Olympics, in the rank of a Leutnant, he was a member of the German relay team which finished sixth in the 4x10 km relay competition. He also participated in the demonstration event, military patrol (precursor to biathlon). His German team finished fifth in the military patrol event. Furthermore Leupold was German 50 km cross-country skiing champion in 1936, 1937 and 1939.
