= František Häckel =

Czech cross-country skier

Medal record

Men's cross-country skiing

World Championships
Silver medal – second place	1925 Johannisbad	50km

František Häckel was a Czech cross-country skier who represented Czechoslovakia in the 1920s. He won a silver medal at the 1925 FIS Nordic World Ski Championships in the 50 km event.
