= Antonín Ettrich =

Czech cross-country skier

Medal record

Men's cross-country skiing

World Championships
Bronze medal – third place	1925 Johannisbad	50 km

Antonín Ettrich was a Czech cross-country skier who competed for Czechoslovakia in the 1920s. He won a bronze medal at the 1925 FIS Nordic World Ski Championships in the 50 km event.
