= Josef Erleback =

Medal record

Men's Cross country skiing

World Championships
Bronze medal – third place	1925 Johannisbad	18km

Josef Erleback was a Czechoslovak Nordic skier who competed in cross-country skiing in the 1920s; he won a bronze medal in the 18 km event at the 1925 FIS Nordic World Ski Championships.
