= FIS Nordic World Ski Championships 1927 =

- Host city: Cortina d'Ampezzo
- Country: Italy
- Events: 4
- Opening: 2 February 1927
- Closing: 5 February 1927

The FIS Nordic World Ski Championships 1927 took place between February 2 and February 5, 1927 in Cortina d'Ampezzo, Italy. Neither Finland nor Norway took part in these championships.

== Men's cross country ==
=== 18 km ===
February 3, 1927

Medal	Athlete	Time
Gold	John Lindgren (SWE)	1:23:55
Silver	František Donth (TCH)	1:29:42
Bronze	Viktor Schneider (GER)	1:30:47

The 18 km event returned after not being held at the FIS Nordic World Ski Championships 1926.

=== 50 km ===
February 5, 1927

Medal	Athlete	Time
Gold	John Lindgren (SWE)	4:11:52
Silver	John Wikström (SWE)	4:29:57
Bronze	František Donth (TCH)	4:34:54

Lindgren's victory margin of 18 minutes is the biggest in the history of the FIS Nordic World Ski Championships

== Men's Nordic combined ==
=== Individual ===
February 2, 1927

Medal	Athlete	Points
Gold	Rudolf Burkert (TCH)	17.947
Silver	Otakar Německý (TCH)	17.645
Bronze	František Wende (TCH)	17.489

== Men's ski jumping ==
=== Individual large hill ===
February 2, 1927

Medal	Athlete	Points
Gold	Tore Edman (SWE)	18.420
Silver	Willen Dick (TCH)	17.562
Bronze	Bertil Carlsson (SWE)	17.433

== Medal table ==
Rank	Nation	Gold	Silver	Bronze	Total
1	Sweden (SWE)	3	1	1	5
2	Czechoslovakia (TCH)	1	3	2	6
3	Germany (GER)	0	0	1	1
Totals (3 entries)		4	4	4	12
