= FIS Nordic World Ski Championships 1925 =

International Nordic skiing competition

- Host city: Janské Lázně
- Country: Czechoslovakia
- Events: 4
- Opening: 4 February 1925
- Closing: 14 February 1925

The FIS Nordic World Ski Championships 1925 took place between 4 and 14 February 1925 in Johannisbad (Janské Lázně), Czechoslovakia.

The event was originally a Rendezvous race organised by the International Ski Federation (FIS), but were given official World Championship status at FIS' 25th congress in 1965.

== Men's cross country ==
=== 18 km ===
12 February 1925

Medal	Athlete	Time
Gold	Otakar Německý (TCH)	1:43:38
Silver	František Donth (TCH)	1:43:54
Bronze	Josef Erleback (TCH)	1:45:40

=== 50 km ===
14 February 1925

Medal	Athlete	Time
Gold	František Donth (TCH)	5:09:56
Silver	František Häckel (TCH)	5:11:20
Bronze	Antonín Ettrich (TCH)	5:15:12

== Men's Nordic combined ==
=== Individual ===
4 February 1925

Medal	Athlete	Points
Gold	Otakar Německý (TCH)	35.816
Silver	Josef Adolf (TCH)	32.874
Bronze	Xaver Affentranger (SUI)	31.403

== Men's ski jumping ==
=== Individual large hill ===
12 February 1925

Medal	Athlete	Points
Gold	Willen Dick (TCH)	18.985
Silver	Henry Ljungmann (NOR)	18.444
Bronze	František Wende (TCH)	18.111

== Medal table ==
Rank	Nation	Gold	Silver	Bronze	Total
1	Czechoslovakia (TCH)	4	3	3	10
2	Norway (NOR)	0	1	0	1
3	Switzerland (SUI)	0	0	1	1
Totals (3 entries)		4	4	4	12
