= Olli Remes =

Finish cross-country skier and military officer

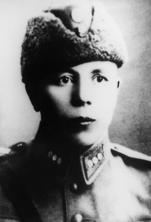

Personal information
- Full name: Olavi Remes
- Born: 8 September 1909 Iisalmi, Finland
- Died: 31 December 1942 (aged 33) Krivi, East Karelia

Sport
- Sport: Skiing
Medal record
Men's cross-country skiing
Representing Finland
World Championships
Bronze medal – third place	1934 Sollefteå	50 km

Olavi „Olli“ Remes (8 September 1909 – 31 December 1942) was a Finnish cross-country skier and military officer who competed in the 1930s.

Remes was born in Iisalmi and died in Krivi, East Karelia.

He won a bronze medal in 50 km at the 1934 FIS Nordic World Ski Championships. In the 1936 Winter Olympics he participated in the demonstration event, military patrol (precursor to biathlon), and finished second in the team event.

== Cross-country skiing results ==
All results are sourced from the International Ski Federation (FIS).

=== World Championships ===
- 1 medal – (1 bronze)

Year	Age	18 km	50 km	4 × 10 km relay
1934	24	—	Bronze	—
