= Josef Schreiner =

German cross-country skier

Medal record

Men's cross-country skiing

World Championships
Silver medal – second place	1934 Sollefteå	4 x 10 km

Josef Schreiner was a German cross-country skier who competed in the 1930s. He won a silver medal in the 4 x 10 km at the 1934 FIS Nordic World Ski Championships in Sollefteå.
