= Matteo Compagnoni =

Italian former short track speed skater

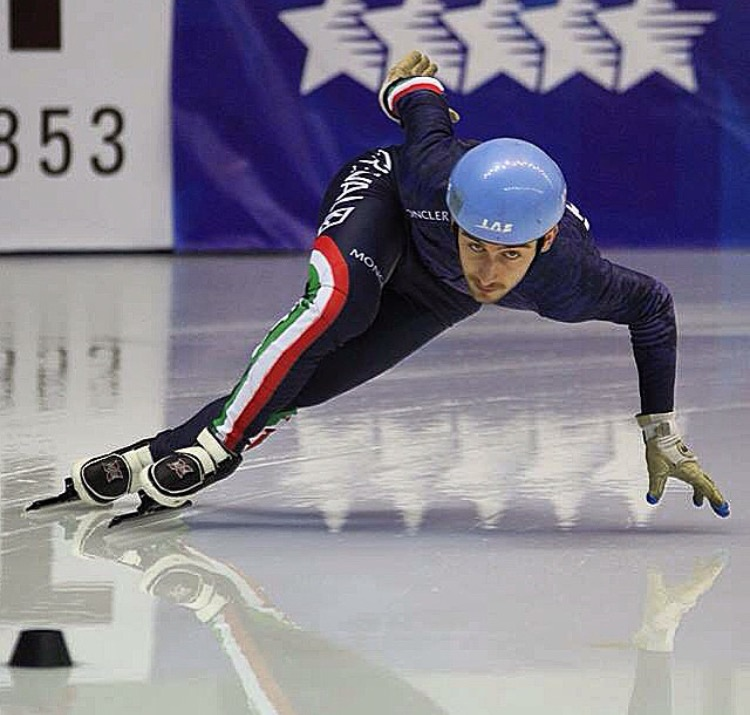
Winter Universiade Games, Granada 2015.

Matteo Compagnoni (born 1 June 1991, in Bormio) is an Italian former short track speed skater. He was a member of the Italian national team and competed for Italy at 2015 Winter Universiade, a multi sport winter event held in Granada, Spain.

Recently, he started to race on zwift with pro esports team DPAC-ELITE.
