= Sforza Compagnoni =

Italian author and painter

Sforza Compagnoni (7 April 1584 – 1640) was an Italian writer and painter.

== Biography ==
He was born in Macerata, where his father was a judge and intellectual, born in to a prominent local family. It is unclear with whom he had training as a painter, the sources disagree. Luigi Lanzi identified Guido Reni, Malvasia, Francesco Albani, and the historian Pagnanelli, Guercino. All however developed from the Bolognese-Roman circle of painters emerging from the studio or followers of Annibale and Ludovico Carracci.

Compagnoni moved to Rome where he became a professor (academic) of the Accademia di San Luca. He was also named Knight or Cavaliere of the Order of Santo Stefano d’Ungheria in 1629. In 1628 he was admitted into the Order of the Knights of Malta.

Most of his paintings, except for a few religious subjects in churches, have been lost or destroyed. He is mainly identified as the author of the heraldic shield for the Accademia dei Catenati in Macerata.

Others attribute other engravings of the same format, for example, he may have provided some of the engravings for the book by Amico Ricci for his biography of artists in the area of the Marca di Ancona. He also contributed to the decoration of the church of San Giovanni in Macerata. He painted a Birth of Mary for the Macerata Cathedral.
