= John Lindgren =

Swedish cross-country skier

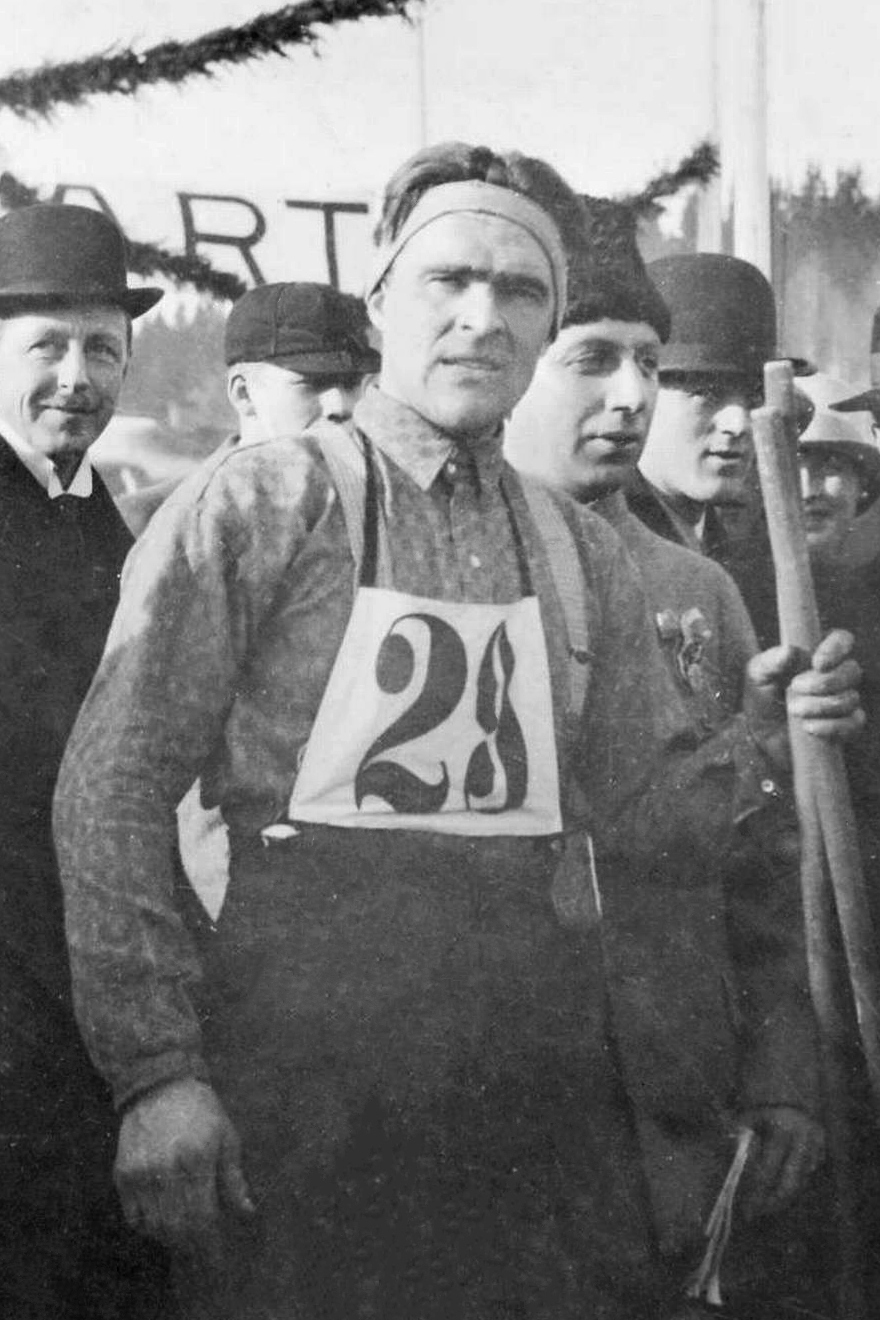
- John Lindgren during the 1920s

Personal information
- Born: 8 November 1899 Hedlunda, Sweden
- Died: 30 January 1990 (aged 90) Lycksele, Sweden
- Height: 170 cm (5 ft 7 in)

Sport
- Sport: Cross-country skiing
- Club: Lycksele IF
Medal record
Men's cross-country skiing
Representing Sweden
World Championships
Gold medal – first place	1927 Cortina d'Ampezzo	18 km
Gold medal – first place	1927 Cortina d'Ampezzo	50 km

John Halvar Theofron Lindgren (8 November 1899 – 30 January 1990) was a Swedish cross-country skier who won the 1927 world titles in the 18 km and 50 km events. He finished eighth in the 50 km race at the 1932 Winter Olympics. His younger brother Ivan was also an Olympic cross-country skier.

== Cross-country skiing results ==
All results are sourced from the International Ski Federation (FIS).

=== Olympic Games ===
Year	Age	18 km	50 km
1932	32	—	8

=== World Championships ===
- 2 medals – (2 gold)

Year	Age	17 km	18 km	50 km
1927	27	—N/a	Gold	Gold
1930	29	—	—N/a	7
