= Viktor Schneider =

German cross-country skier

Medal record

Men's Cross country skiing

World Championships
Bronze medal – third place	1927 Cortina d'Ampezzo	18 km

Viktor Schnieder was a German cross-country skier who competed in the 1920s. He won a bronze medal in the 18 km event at the 1927 FIS Nordic World Ski Championships.
