= Silvio Confortola =

Italian cross-country skier (1910–2003)

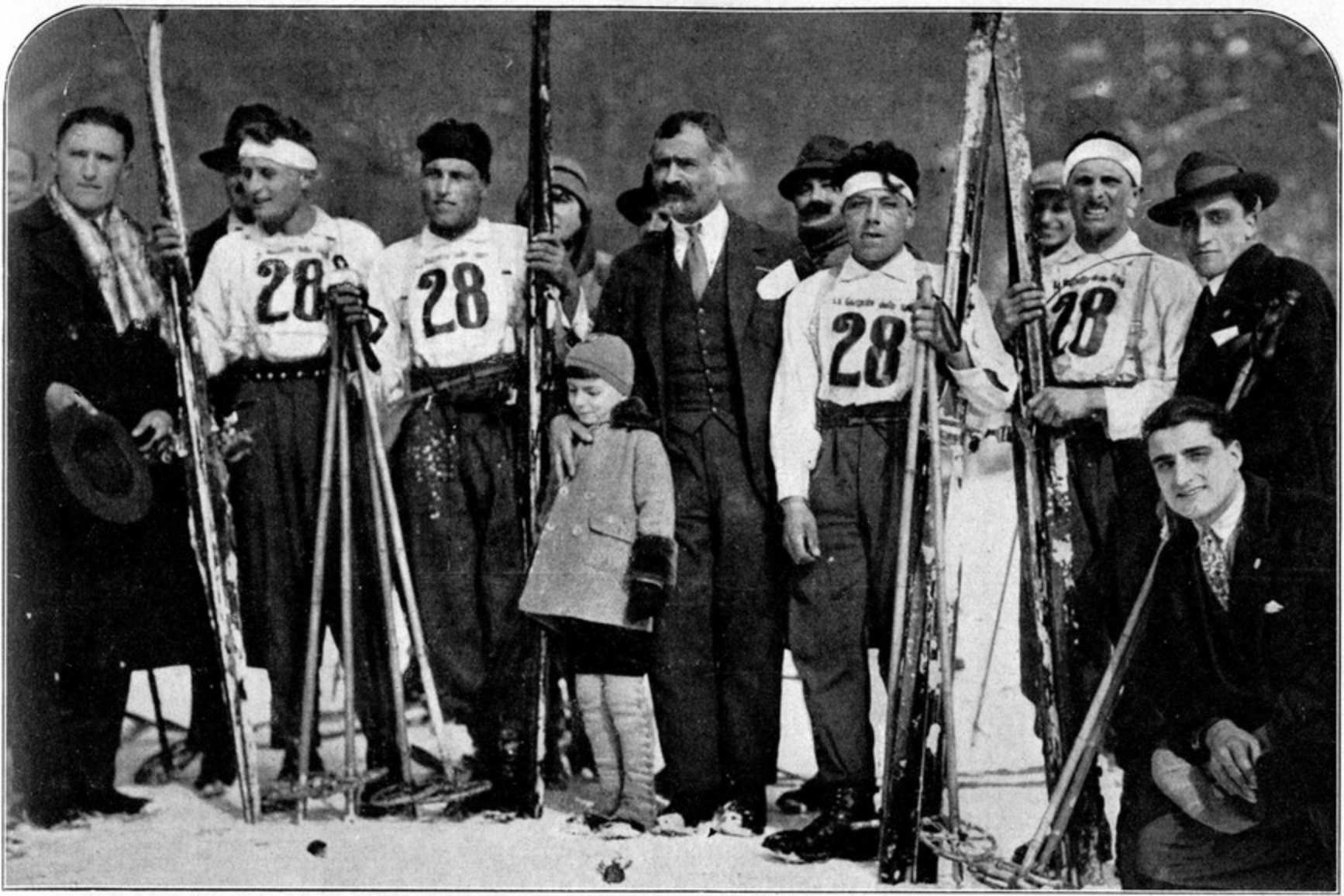

Personal information
- Born: 13 January 1910
- Died: 29 January 2003 (aged 93)

Sport
- Sport: Skiing
Medal record
Men's cross-country skiing
World Championships
Bronze medal – third place	1937 Chamonix	4 x 10 km

Silvio Confortola (13 January 1910 – 29 January 2003) was an Italian cross-country skier who competed in the 1930s.

== Biography ==
He won a bronze medal in the 4 x 10 km at the 1937 FIS Nordic World Ski Championships. He also participated in the 1948 Winter Olympics, where he placed sixth in the 4 x 10 km relay competition and eighteenth in the 50 km event.

At the 1935 Trofeo Mezzalama, together with Aristide Compagnoni and Mario Compagnoni, he finished third. The 1938 Trofeo Mezzalama he won together with brothers Severino and Aristide Compagnoni.

== Further notable results ==
- 1938: 3rd, Italian men's championships of cross-country skiing, 50 km
- 1939: 2nd, Italian men's championships of cross-country skiing, 18 km
- 1943: 3rd, Italian men's championships of cross-country skiing, 18 km
- 1946: 3rd, Italian men's championships of cross-country skiing, 50 km
- 1947: 2nd, Italian men's championships of cross-country skiing, 45 km

== See also ==
- Antonella Confortola
