= Alfred Dahlqvist =

Swedish cross-country skier (1914–1983)

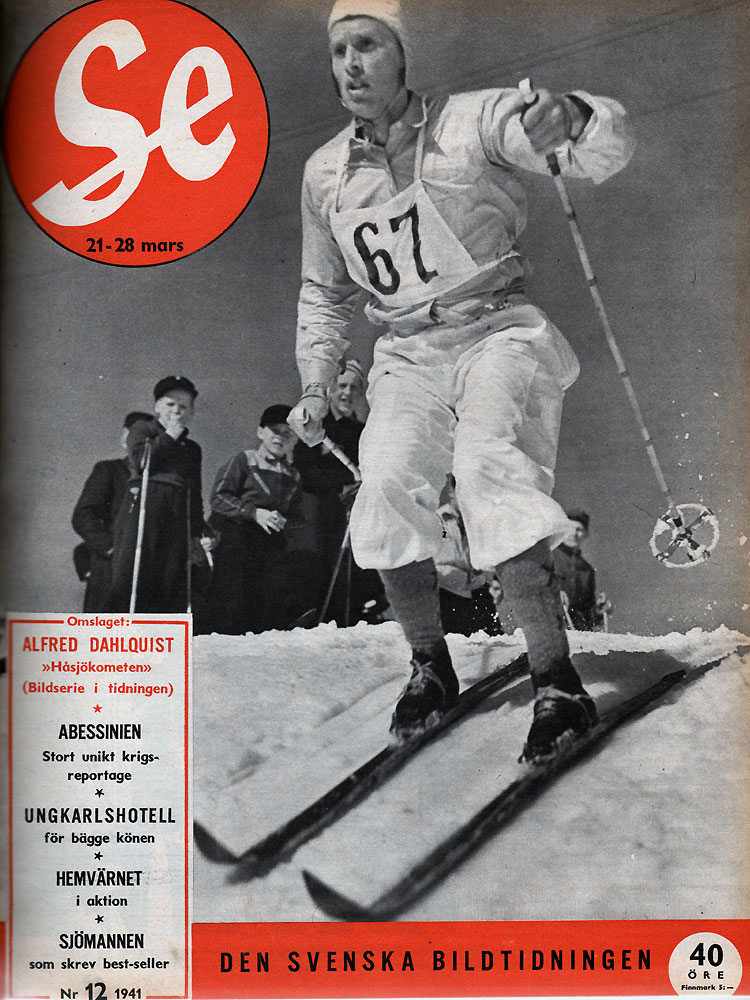
- Alfred Dahlquist in 1941

Personal information
- Born: 13 May 1914 Håsjö, Sweden
- Died: 21 October 1983 (aged 69)

Sport
- Sport: Cross-country skiing
Medal record
Men's cross-country skiing
Representing Sweden
World Championships
Silver medal – second place	1938 Lahti	18 km

Alfred Dahlqvist (13 May 1914 – 21 October 1983) was a Swedish cross-country skier who won a silver medal in the 18 km event at the 1938 World Championships. He won three more medals in 1941, but these are not considered official because of the limited number of competitors. The same year he was awarded the Svenska Dagbladet Gold Medal.

== Cross-country skiing results ==
All results are sourced from the International Ski Federation (FIS).

=== World Championships ===
- 1 medal – (1 silver)

Year	Age	18 km	50 km	4 × 10 km relay
1937	22	6	DNS	4
1938	23	Silver	DNF	—

Preceded by Henry Kälarne & Håkan Lidman	Svenska Dagbladet Gold Medal; 1941	Succeeded by Gunder Hägg
