= Arne Hovde =

Norwegian ski jumper

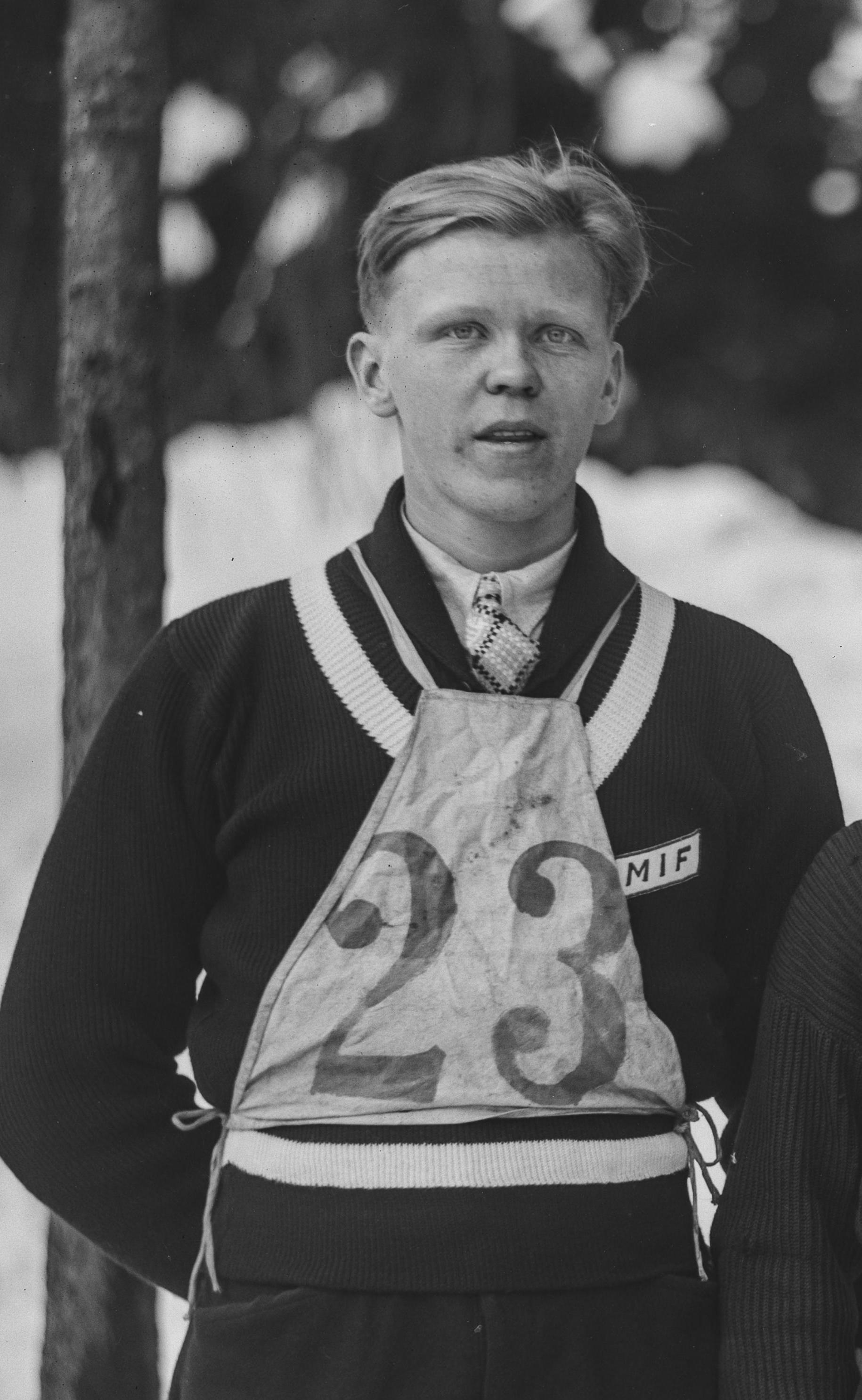
- Hovde in 1934

Medal record

Men's ski jumping

Representing Norway

World Championships
Silver medal – second place	1934 Sollefteå	Individual large hill

Arne Hovde (28 September 1914 – 12 December 1935) was a Norwegian ski jumper who competed in the early 1930s. He won a silver medal in the ski jumping individual large hill at the 1934 FIS Nordic World Ski Championships in Sollefteå.
