= Ottavio Compagnoni =

Italian cross-country skier (1926–2021)

Ottavio Compagnoni (11 September 1926 – 29 September 2021) was an Italian cross-country skier who competed in the 1950s. Compagnoni finished 36th in the 18 km event at the 1952 Winter Olympics in Oslo. He was the brother of the skiers Aristide and Severino Compagnoni. He died in Moena in September 2021, at the age of 95.

== Select results ==
- 1950: 1st, Italian men's championships of cross-country skiing, 18 km
- 1953: 2nd, Italian men's championships of cross-country skiing, 15 km
- 1955: 2nd, Italian men's championships of cross-country skiing, 15 km
- 1956: 2nd, Italian men's championships of cross-country skiing, 15 km
- 1957: 3rd, Italian men's championships of cross-country skiing, 15 km
- 1958: 2nd, Italian men's championships of cross-country skiing, 15 km
- 1959: 2nd, Italian men's championships of cross-country skiing, 30 km
