= František Donth =

German Czechoslovak skier

Medal record

Men's cross country skiing

World Championships
Gold medal – first place	1925 Johannisbad	50 km
Silver medal – second place	1925 Johannisbad	18 km
Silver medal – second place	1927 Cortina d'Ampezzo	18 km
Bronze medal – third place	1927 Cortina d'Ampezzo	50 km

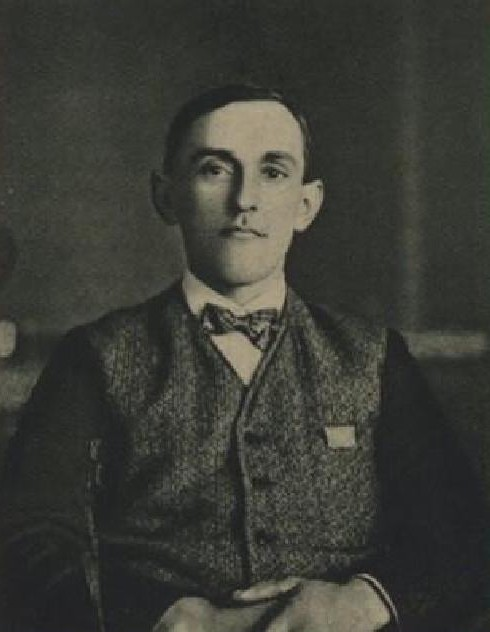
Franz Donth's Portrait

František Donth, or Franz Donth in German (1896 in Rokytnice nad Jizerou - 11 July 1976 in Ilsenburg) was an Ethnic German Nordic skier who competed for Czechoslovakia in cross-country skiing in the 1920s. He won four medals at the FIS Nordic World Ski Championships with a gold in the 50 km (1925), two silvers in the 18 km (1925, 1927), and bronze in the 50 km (1927).

At the 1928 Winter Olympics he finished eleventh in the 18 km competition and 14th in the 50 km event.

Franz Donth was an ethnic German, who competed for the Hauptverband Deutscher Wintersportvereine der Tschechoslowakischen Republik (Central Federation of German Winter Sports Associations of the Czechoslovak Republic).
