= Otakar Německý =

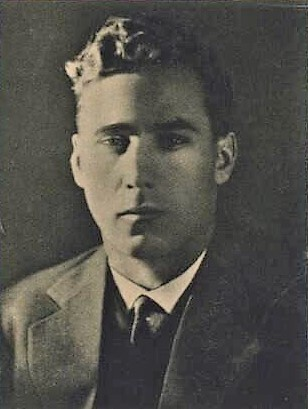
- Německý in 1925

Personal information
- Born: 2 March 1902 Nové Město na Moravě, Bohemia, Austria-Hungary
- Died: 18 March 1967 (aged 65) Brno, Czechoslovakia

Sport
- Sport: Skiing
Medal record
Representing Czechoslovakia
Men's Nordic skiing
World Championships
Gold medal – first place	1925 Johannisbad	Cross country 18km
Gold medal – first place	1925 Johannisbad	Nordic combined
Silver medal – second place	1927 Cortina d'Ampezzo	Nordic combined

Otakar Německý (2 March 1902 – 18 March 1967) was a Czech Nordic skier. He competed for Czechoslovakia in Nordic combined and cross-country skiing in the 1920s.

He was born in Nové Město na Moravě. He was the younger brother of Josef Německý.

Německý won three medals at the FIS Nordic World Ski Championships with golds in the 18 km and Nordic combined (1925) and a silver in the Nordic combined (1927).

At the 1928 Winter Olympics he finished 16th in the 18 kilometre cross-country skiing event and ninth in the Nordic combined competition.
