= Walter Motz =

German cross-country skier

Medal record

Men's cross-country skiing

World Championships
Silver medal – second place	1934 Sollefteå	4 x 10 km

Walter Motz (22 March 1909 – 5 March 1999) was a German cross-country skier who competed in the 1930s. He won a silver medal in the 4 x 10 km at the 1934 FIS Nordic World Ski Championships in Sollefteå. He also competed in the Men's 18 km event at the 1936 Winter Olympics, finishing 18th in a field of 75 competitors.
