= Mauritz Brännström =

Swedish cross-country skier

Personal information
- Born: 4 January 1918 Sweden
- Died: 14 December 1974 (aged 56) Sweden

Sport
- Sport: Skiing

Mauritz Brännström (4 January 1918 – 14 December 1974) was a Swedish cross-country skier who competed in the late 1930s through the 1950s.

== Skiing career ==
Brännström won the Vasaloppet event in 1941.

He was a podium contender in the Vasaloppet, even after his World Championships years. In 1945, four years after his controversial silver medal, Brännström finished the 90 km race in third place with a time of 6 hours, 35 minutes, and 5 seconds.

Brännström also finished second in the 50 km at the 1941 FIS Nordic World Ski Championships, which had taken place in Cortina d'Ampezzo, Italy. The event was later declared a "non-event" by the International Ski Federation (FIS) in 1946 due to the small number of skiers who had competed. Due to this decision, the medals were not counted in the overall FIS Nordic World Ski Championships.

In 1957, he won the Malmfältsloppet Race.

== Cross-country skiing results ==
=== World Championships ===
Year	Age	18 km	50 km	4 × 10 km relay
1938	20	—	22	—
