= Julia Brännström Nordtug =

Norwegian politician (born 1991)

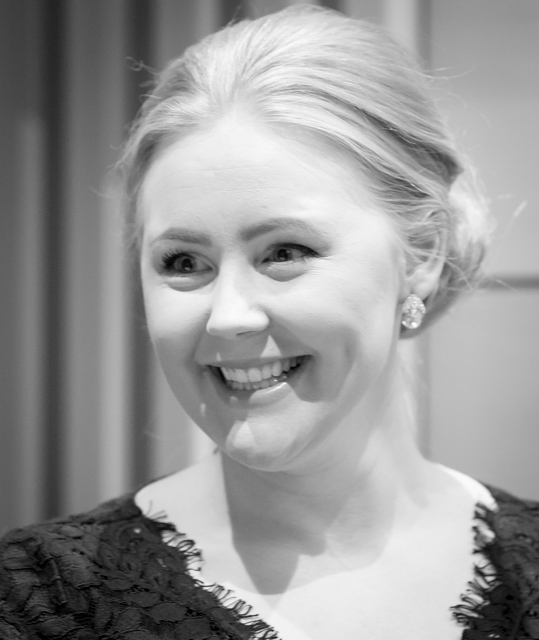
- Brännström Nordtug in 2017

Member of the Storting
- Incumbent
- Assumed office 1 October 2025
- Constituency: Østfold

Personal details
- Born: 28 September 1991 (age 34)
- Party: Progress Party
- Relatives: Andreas Brännström (brother)

Julia Brännström Nordtug (born 28 September 1991) is a Swedish-born Norwegian politician who was elected member of the Storting in 2025. From 2013 to 2025, she was a deputy member of the Storting. She is the sister of Andreas Brännström.
