= Lars Theodor Jonsson =

Swedish cross-country skier

Lars-Theodor Jonsson
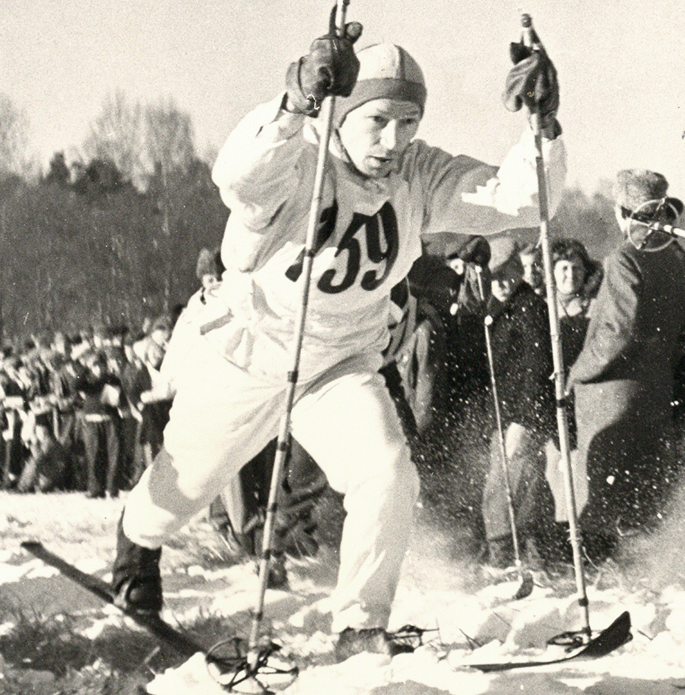
- Lars-Theodor Jonsson by the 1930's

Personal information
- Born: 10 November 1903 Frostviken, Strömsund Municipality, Sweden
- Died: 11 October 1998 (aged 94) Strömsund, Sweden

Sport
- Sport: Cross-country skiing
- Club: Östersunds SK
Medal record
Men's cross-country skiing
Representing Sweden
World Championships
Bronze medal – third place	1934 Sollefteå	4 × 10 km relay

Lars Theodor Jonsson (10 November 1903 – 11 October 1998) was a Swedish cross-country skier. He was two-times Swedish champion, in the 15 km in 1933 and the 30 km in 1935. He finished seventh in the 18 km event at the 1928 Winter Olympics and won a bronze medal in the 4 × 10 km relay at the 1934 FIS Nordic World Ski Championships.

== Cross-country skiing results ==
=== Olympic Games ===
Year	Age	18 km	50 km
1928	24	7	—

=== World Championships ===
- 1 medal – (1 bronze)

Year	Age	17 km	18 km	50 km	4 × 10 km relay
1930	26	—	—N/a	19	—N/a
1934	30	—N/a	—	—	Bronze

== Personal life ==
Starting with the late 1940s, Jonsson moved to a forest hut near the city of Stromsund, living in isolation for over 40 years. Towards the end of his life, he moved to a retirement home. His hut has been preserved and moved to city's local museum where it can still be visited.
