= Filippo Bellini =

Italian painter

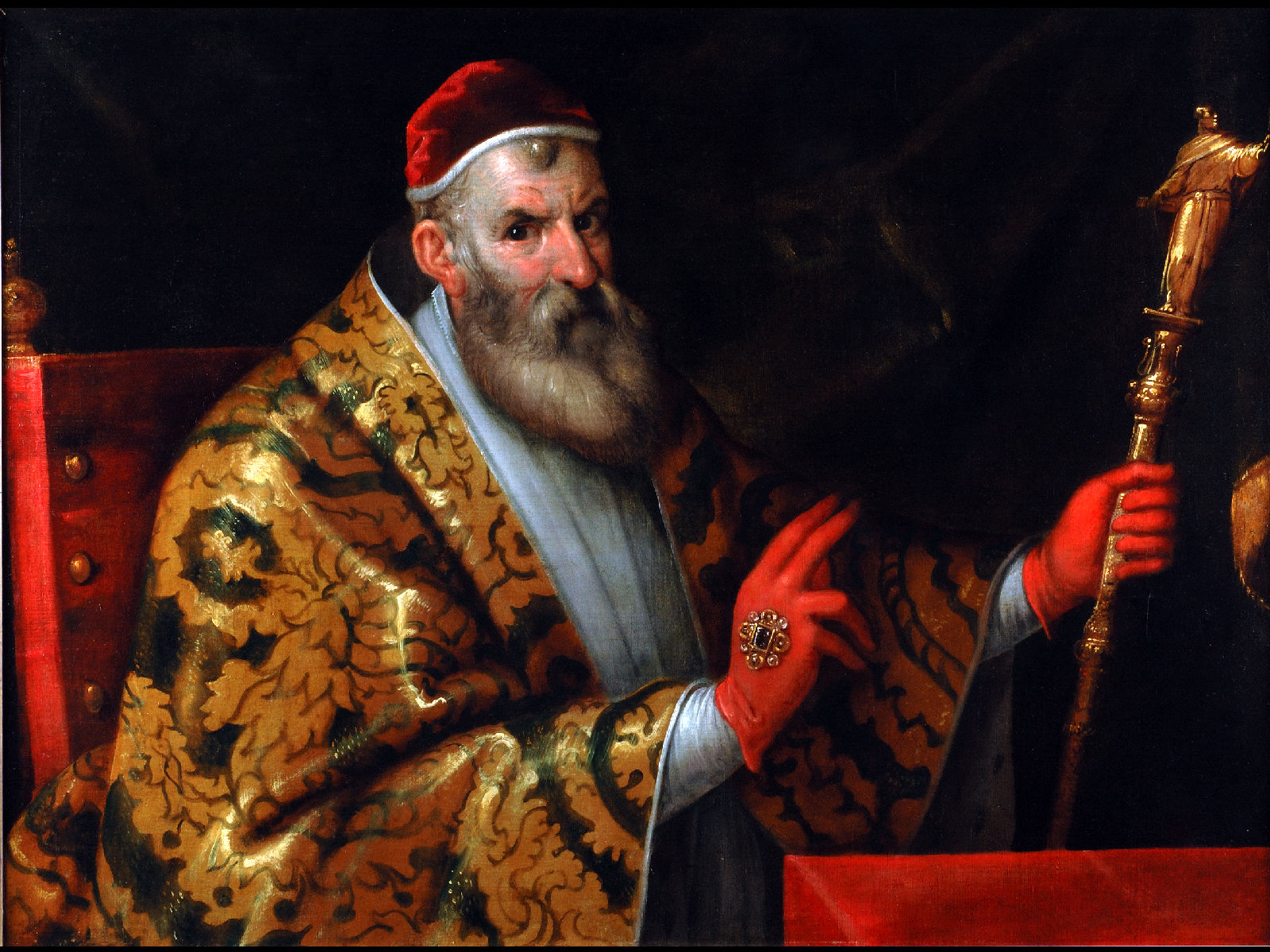
Bellini's portrait of Pope Sixtus

Filippo Bellini (c. 1550/1555 – 1604) was an Italian painter from Urbino who was strongly influenced by artist Federico Barocci. He is known for his painting of Pope Sixtus V. Bellini worked mostly in the Marche and in Romagne regions of Italy. His paintings are mostly located in churches and museums in the province of Ancona and in Macerata.
