= Allan Karlsson (skier) =

Swedish cross-country skier

Medal record

Men's cross-country skiing

Representing Sweden

World Championships
Bronze medal – third place	1934 Sollefteå	4 × 10 km relay

Allan Karlsson (January 23, 1911 – April 6, 1991) was a Swedish cross-country skier who competed in the 1930s. He won a bronze medal in the 4 × 10 km relay at the 1934 FIS Nordic World Ski Championships in Sollefteå.

== Cross-country skiing results ==
=== World Championships ===
Year	Age	18 km	50 km	4 × 10 km relay
1934	23	—	—	Bronze
