= Giulio Gerardi =

Italian cross-country skier

Medal record

Men's cross-country skiing

World Championships
Bronze medal – third place	1937 Chamonix	4 x 10 km
Bronze medal – third place	1941 Cortina d'Ampezzo	4 x 10 km

Giulio Gerardi (30 November 1912 – 10 July 2001) was an Italian cross-country skier who competed in the 1930s.

At the 1936 Winter Olympics he was a member of the Italian relay team which finished fourth in the 4x10 km relay competition. In the 18 km event he finished 19th.

He won Bronze medals in the 4 x 10 km events of the FIS Nordic World Ski Championships 1937 and 1941.

Further notable results were:

- 1934: 1st, Italian men's championships of cross-country skiing, 18 km
- 1935: 2nd, Italian men's championships of cross-country skiing, 18 km
- 1936: 1st, Italian men's championships of cross-country skiing, 18 km
- 1940: 2nd, Italian men's championships of cross-country skiing, 18 km
