= FIS Nordic World Ski Championships 1934 =

International Nordic skiing competition

- Host city: Sollefteå
- Country: Sweden
- Events: 5
- Opening: 20 February 1934
- Closing: 25 February 1934

The FIS Nordic World Ski Championships 1934 took place on February 20–25, 1934 in Sollefteå, Sweden.

== Men's cross country ==
=== 18 km ===
February 22, 1934

Medal	Athlete	Time
Gold	Sulo Nurmela (FIN)	1:04:29
Silver	Veli Saarinen (FIN)	1:05:35
Bronze	Martti Lappalainen (FIN)	1:06:08

=== 50 km ===
February 24, 1934

Medal	Athlete	Time
Gold	Elis Wiklund (SWE)	4:06:43
Silver	Nils-Joel Englund (SWE)	4:07:41
Bronze	Olli Remes (FIN)	4:08:05

=== 4 × 10 km relay ===
February 25, 1934

Medal	Team	Time
Gold	Finland (Sulo Nurmela, Klaes Karppinen, Martti Lappalainen, Veli Saarinen)	2:40:28
Silver	Germany (Walter Motz, Josef Schreiner, Willy Bogner, Herbert Leupold)	2:51:23
Bronze	Sweden (Allan Karlsson, Lars Theodor Jonsson, Nils-Joel Englund, Arthur Häggblad)	2:53:07

Germany's silver was the first for the nation at the FIS Nordic World Ski Championships. While battling for the silver medal, Sweden's Arthur Häggblad and Norway's Oddbjørn Hagen got off course during their final leg and lost about 10 minutes. They were both passed by Germany, and Häggblad beat Hagen at the finish line for the bronze medal.

== Men's Nordic combined ==
=== Individual ===
February 20, 1934

Medal	Athlete	Points
Gold	Oddbjørn Hagen (NOR)	441.90
Silver	Sverre Kolterud (NOR)	427.50
Bronze	Hans Vinjarengen (NOR)	416.70

== Men's ski jumping ==
=== Individual large hill ===
February 20, 1934

Medal	Athlete	Points
Gold	Kristian Johansson (NOR)	228.5
Silver	Arne Hovde (NOR)	225.0
Bronze	Sven Eriksson (SWE)	223.1

== Medal table ==
Rank	Nation	Gold	Silver	Bronze	Total
1	Norway (NOR)	2	2	1	5
2	Finland (FIN)	2	1	2	5
3	Sweden (SWE)	1	1	2	4
4	Germany (GER)	0	1	0	1
Totals (4 entries)		5	5	5	15
