= Jussi Kurikkala =

Finnish cross-country skier (1912–1951)

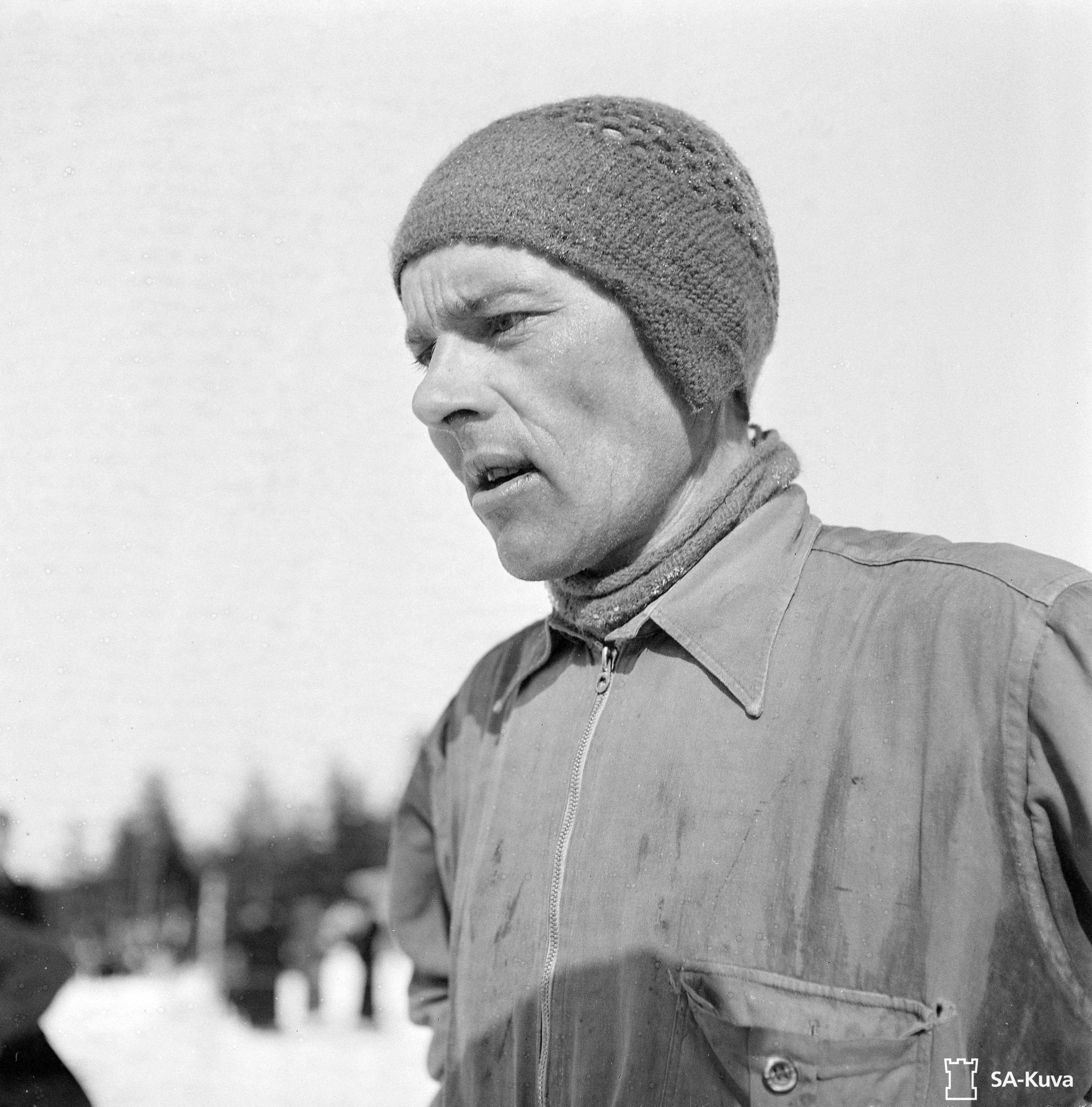
- Jussi Kurikkala in 1944

Medal record

Men's cross-country skiing

Representing Finland

World Championships
| Gold medal – first place | 1938 Lahti | 4 × 10 km relay |
| Gold medal – first place | 1939 Zakopane | 18 km |
| Silver medal – second place | 1937 Chamonix | 4 × 10 km relay |

Juho "Jussi" Kurikkala (12 August 1912 – 10 March 1951) was a Finnish cross-country skier who competed in the 1930s. He was born in Kalajoki, and won three medals at the FIS Nordic World Ski Championships with a silver in the 4 × 10 km relay in 1937, a gold in the same event in 1938, and a gold in the 18 km in 1939. He was also a long-distance runner and competed in the marathon at the 1948 Summer Olympics.

== Cross-country skiing results ==
All results are sourced from the International Ski Federation (FIS).

=== World Championships ===
- 3 medals – (2 gold, 1 silver)

| Year | Age | 18 km | 50 km | 4 × 10 km relay |
|---|---|---|---|---|
| 1937 | 24 | 5 | — | Silver |
| 1938 | 25 | 6 | 7 | Gold |
| 1939 | 26 | Gold | — | — |
