= Goffredo Baur =

Italian cross-country skier

Medal record

Men's cross-country skiing

World Championships
Bronze medal – third place	1939 Zakopane	4 x 10 km

Goffredo, also called Gottfried Baur, was an Italian cross-country skier who competed in the 1930s.

In 1937, he placed second, and in 1939 third at the 18 km race of the Italian men's championships of cross-country skiing, 18 km. He won a bronze medal in the 4 x 10 km at the 1939 FIS Nordic World Ski Championships.
