= Aristide Compagnoni =

Italian cross-country skier

Personal information
- Born: 26 July 1910 Santa Caterina di Valfurva, Italy
- Died: 13 April 1995 (aged 84)

Sport
- Sport: Skiing
Medal record
World Championships
Bronze medal – third place	1937 Chamonix	4 x 10 km
Bronze medal – third place	1939 Zakopane	4 x 10 km

Aristide Compagnoni (26 July 1910 – 13 April 1995) was an Italian cross-country skier who competed in the 1930s.

Compagnoni, born in Santa Caterina Valfurva was the brother of the skiers Severino and Ottavio Compagnoni. He won two bronze medals in the 4 x 10 km at the FIS Nordic World Ski Championships (1937 and 1939).

At the 1935 Trofeo Mezzalama, together with Mario Compagnoni and Silvio Confortola, he finished third. The 1938 Trofeo Mezzalama he won together with the brothers Severino and Silvio Confortola. He participated in the demonstration event, military patrol (precursor to biathlon), in the 1948 Winter Olympics, when he had the military rank Sergente.

Further notable results were:

- 1939: 1st, Italian men's championships of cross-country skiing, 18 km
- 1940: 3rd, Italian men's championships of cross-country skiing, 18 km
- 1941: 1st, Italian men's championships of cross-country skiing, 50 km
- 1943: 2nd, Italian men's championships of cross-country skiing, 50 km
- 1946: 3rd, Italian men's championships of cross-country skiing, 18 km
