= Deaths in September 2000 =

The following is a list of notable deaths in September 2000.

Entries for each day are listed alphabetically by surname. A typical entry lists information in the following sequence:

- Name, age, country of citizenship at birth, subsequent country of citizenship (if applicable), reason for notability, cause of death (if known), and reference.

== September 2000 ==
=== 1 ===
- Olavi Ahonen, 77, Finnish film actor and comedian.
- Barbara Brooke, Baroness Brooke of Ystradfellte, 92, British politician.
- Dee Kessel Caperton, 57, American politician, cancer.
- P. P. Ummer Koya, 78, Indian politician, Gandhian, freedom fighter and educationist.
- Franklin P. Peterson, 70, American mathematician, stroke.
- Gerry Sullivan, 57, Australian politician.

=== 2 ===
- Vicente Asensi, 81, Spanish football player.
- Ishaq Bux, 83, Indian actor.
- Heinz Harmel, 94, German SS general during World War II.
- Jean Speegle Howard, 73, American actress (Apollo 13, Scrooged, Matilda), respiratory disease and cardiomyopathy.
- Elvera Sanchez, 95, American dancer.
- Bianca Schenk, 82, Austrian Olympic figure skater (1936).
- Curt Siodmak, 98, German-American novelist and screenwriter (The Wolf Man, Donovan's Brain), cancer.
- Gennady Smirnov, 45, Russian footballer, stabbed.
- Audrey Wise, 68, British politician, brain tumour.

=== 3 ===
- Asaf Abdrakhmanov, 81, Soviet naval officer and war hero during World War II.
- Edward Anhalt, 86, American screenwriter (Panic in the Streets), Oscar winner (1951), cancer.
- Gordon Burgess, 81, New Zealand cricket player and administrator.
- Adrian P. Burke, 95, American lawyer and politician.
- Clodomiro Cortoni, 77, Argentine Olympic cyclist (1948, 1952).
- Oldřich Daněk, 73, Czech dramatist, writer, director and screenwriter.
- R. H. Harris, 84, American gospel singer (Soul Stirrers).
- Carlos Isaack, 76, Argentine Olympic sprinter (1948).
- Elvera Sanchez, 95, Puerto Rican dancer.
- Jack Simmons, 85, British transport historian.
- Clyde Sukeforth, 98, American baseball player (Cincinnati Reds, Brooklyn Dodgers).
- Indriði Guðmundur Þorsteinsson, 74, Icelandic writer.
- Walt Stanchfield, 81, American animator (The Jungle Book, The Fox and the Hound, The Great Mouse Detective).

=== 4 ===
- Augusto Vargas Alzamora, 77, Peruvian prelate in the Roman Catholic Church.
- James Atuti, 46, Kenyan Olympic sprinter (1984).
- Sir John Beith, 86, British diplomat.
- David Brown, 53, American bass guitarist (Santana), liver and kidney failure.
- Jack Fjeldstad, 85, Norwegian actor and stage producer.
- Pinky May, 89, American baseball player (Philadelphia Phillies).
- Mihály Mayer, 66, Hungarian water polo player, Olympic champion (1956, 1960, 1964, 1968).
- Mukri, 78, Indian film actor, heart attack.
- Gilles Potvin, 76, Canadian music critic and music historian.
- Antonio Ruberti, 73, Italian politician and engineer.
- Mary Shepard, 90, English illustrator of children's books.

=== 5 ===
- Margaret Andrew, 92, American experimental engineer.
- John Bishop, 69, British poet and publisher.
- Desmond Bristow, 83, British intelligence officer.
- Carlo M. Cipolla, 78, Italian economic historian.
- Vernon Dancer, 77, American harness racing driver and horse trainer.
- Mary DeDecker, 90, American botanist.
- Roy Fredericks, 57, West Indian cricketer, cancer.
- George Musso, 90, American football player (Chicago Bears) and member of the Pro Football Hall of Fame.
- Palle Nielsen, 80, Danish illustrator and graphic artist.

=== 6 ===
- David E. Bell, 81, American public servant, director of the U.S. Office of Management and Budget (1961–1962), leukemia.
- Marion T. Bennett, 86, American politician and judge.
- Rudy Fernández, 89, Cuban baseball player.
- Robert Lindsay, 95, English-born Australian politician.
- Abdul Haris Nasution, 81, Indonesian general and politician, cerebrovascular disease.
- Nino Ramishvili, 90, Soviet and Georgian ballet dancer and choreographer.
- Fritz Ruchay, 90, German football player and manager.
- Jürgen Schütze, 49, East German racing cyclist and Olympian (1972).
- Aleksander Skiba, 55, Polish volleyball player and Olympian (1968).
- Jiří Sovák, 79, Czech actor.
- Kees van Aelst, 83, Dutch water polo player and Olympian (1936).
- Roger Verey, 88, Polish rower and Olympian (1936).
- Desmond Wilcox, 69, British journalist and television producer, heart attack.

=== 7 ===
- Hyginus Anugo, 22, Nigerian sprinter, car accident.
- Bruce Gyngell, 71, Australian television executive, cancer-related illness.
- Eigil Nielsen, 81, Danish amateur football goalkeeper and Olympic medalist (1948).
- Gian Luigi Polidoro, 73, Italian film director and screenwriter.
- Vitaliy Popovich, 37, Ukrainian racewalker and Olympian (1988, 1996), suicide.
- Aleksander Skiba, 55, Polish volleyball player and coach.
- Nick Tremark, 87, American baseball player (Brooklyn Dodgers).

=== 8 ===
- Enrique Alessio, 82, Argentine musician.
- Silvia Bravo, 55, Mexican physicist.
- Nick De Morgoli, 83, French photojournalist.
- Yves Gaucher, 66, Canadian abstract painter and printmaker.
- Otto Katharus Lind, 79, Danish resistance fighter and general.
- August Lütke-Westhüs, 74, German equestrian and Olympian (1956).
- Carlos Castillo Peraza, 53, Mexican politician, heart attack.
- Raul Roulien, 94, Brazilian actor, singer, and film director.

=== 9 ===
- Edgar Andrew Collard, 89, Canadian journalist and historian.
- Julian Critchley, 69, British politician.
- Florence Dillsworth, 62, Sierra Leonean educator.
- Herbert Friedman, 84, American physicist and astronomer, cancer.
- Chuck Holmes, 55, American adult film producer, businessman and philanthropist, AIDS-related complications.
- Chuck Leonowicz, 42, American Olympic bobsledder (1992).
- Branko Mataja, 76, Yugoslav–American folk and blues musician, heart attack.
- Veerasamy Ringadoo, 79, Mauritian politician, minister and Governor-General of Mauritius.
- Peter Robinson, 78, English football player.
- Robert S. Stevens, American politician and jurist.
- Bill Waddington, 84, English music hall performer, actor, and comedian, Parkinson's disease.

=== 10 ===
- Jakie Astor, 82, English politician and sportsman.
- Viv Cooper, 91, Australian politician.
- Zaib-un-Nissa Hamidullah, 81, Pakistani writer and journalist.
- Chandra Khonnokyoong, 91, Thai Maechi.
- Seybourn Harris Lynne, 93, American district judge (United States District Court for the Northern District of Alabama).
- Émilien Méresse, 85, French footballer.
- William Nierenberg, 81, American physicist and member of the Manhattan Project, cancer.
- Lester Novros, 91, American artist and animator.
- José Gil Solé, 71, Spanish cyclist.
- Cesare Valle, 98, Italian architect.
- Ben Wicks, 73, British-Canadian cartoonist, illustrator, and author, cancer.

=== 11 ===
- Herbert H. Bateman, 72, American politician, member of the U.S. House of Representatives (since 1983), cancer.
- Peter Browne, 76, Australian politician.
- Joe Dale, 79, English footballer.
- Philipp Fehl, 80, Austrian artist and art historian.
- Ham Heung-chul, 69, South Korean football player, manager and Olympian (1964).
- Martin James Monti, 78, US Army Air Force pilot.
- William Wilson Quinn, 92, US Army officer.
- Joe Skubitz, 94, American politician, member of the U.S. House Of Representatives (1963-1978).
- Bob Thurbon, 82, American football player (Steagles, Card-Pitt, Buffalo Bisons).

=== 12 ===
- Leonard Alufurai, 74-75, Solomon Island bishop.
- Juan Ibáñez Díez-Gutiérrez, 62, Mexican actor, film director, producer and writer.
- Konrad Kujau, 62, German illustrator and forger, stomach cancer.
- Gary Olsen, 42, English actor (2point4 Children, The Cook, the Thief, His Wife & Her Lover, The Bill), colorectal cancer.
- Alfredo Pasotti, 75, Italian road bicycle racer.
- Hubert Shurtz, 77, American football player (Pittsburgh Steelers).
- Stanley Turrentine, 66, American jazz tenor saxophonist, stroke.

=== 13 ===
- Lloyd Anderson, 98, American business executive.
- J. Stewart Brooks, 90, Canadian engineer and political figure.
- Robert Craigie Cross, 89, Scottish philosopher.
- Jānis Gilis, 57, Soviet and Latvian football player.
- Betty Jeffrey, 92, Australian writer.
- Howard Johnson, 89, British politician.
- Rolf Kauka, 83, German comic artist.
- Jerzy Lipiński, 91, Polish racing cyclist.
- Thurman "Fum" McGraw, 73, American football player (Detroit Lions).
- Ian Stephen, 83, South African rower and Olympian (1948, 1952).
- Duane Swanson, 87, American basketball player and Olympian (1936).
- Pedro Morales Torres, 68, Chilean football manager.

=== 14 ===
- Peter Barker, 45, British Virgin Islander Olympic sailor (1984).
- Lazăr Baroga, 63, Romanian Olympic weightlifter (1960, 1964).
- Françoise Brauner, 89, Austrian-born French pediatrician and child psychiatrist.
- George Christopher, 92, Greek-American politician.
- J. C. Coffee, 94, American football coach and player.
- William Perry Copple, 83, American district judge (United States District Court for the District of Arizona).
- Leroy Cromartie, 77, American baseball player.
- Jerzy Giedroyc, 94, Polish writer and political activist, heart attack.
- Jean Halain, 80, French film screenwriter.
- Frederick Erroll, 1st Baron Erroll of Hale, 86, British politician.
- Cheng Kejie, 66, Chinese government official, execution by lethal injection.
- Gyula Lengyel, 68, Hungarian Olympic rower (1960).
- Igor Luzhkovsky, 62, Russian swimmer and Olympian (1960).
- George Myatt, 86, American baseball player (New York Giants, Washington Senators).
- Beah Richards, 80, American actress (Guess Who's Coming to Dinner, In the Heat of the Night, ER), Emmy winner (1988, 2000), pulmonary emphysema.
- Hwang Sun-won, 85, Korean short story writer, novelist, and poet.

=== 15 ===
- Burhan Dajani, 78-79, Palestinian academic, jurist and economist.
- Ron Dixon, Canadian businessman.
- David Flusser, 83, Israeli professor of Early Christianity.
- Jennifer Gan, 62, American actress.
- George Kanahele, 70, American native Hawaiian activist, historian and author, heart attack.
- Frank John Kerr, 82, Australian astronomer and physicist, cancer.
- Harmar Nicholls, 87, British politician.
- Jean Yancey, 86, American entrepreneur and motivational speaker, heart failure.

=== 16 ===
- Nadina Abarth-Žerjav, 88, Slovene-Italian businesswoman.
- Ioan Alexandru, 58, Romanian poet, essayist and politician.
- M. H. M. Ashraff, 51, Sri Lankan lawyer and politician, helicopter crash.
- Maurice Black, 84, American politician,complications of Parkinson's disease.
- Hans Brems, 84, Danish American economist.
- Dori Brenner, 53, American actress (Altered States, The Charmings, Ned and Stacey), complications from cancer.
- Şükriye Dikmen, 81-82, Turkish painter.
- Joseph C. Howard Sr., 77, American judge, multiple system atrophy.
- Jeffrey Dillingham, 27, American murderer, lethal injection.
- John Perkovich, 76, American baseball player (Chicago White Sox).
- Alexandra Petrova, 19, Russian model and beauty pageant contestant, shot.
- Dharma Vira, 94, Indian politician.

=== 17 ===
- Hester Burton, 86, English children's writer, stroke.
- Alejandro Cervantes Delgado, 74, Mexican economist and politician.
- Ralph Corsel, Italian-American novelist.
- Cruz Martínez Esteruelas, 68, Spanish politician.
- Georgiy Gongadze, 31, Georgian-Ukrainian journalist and film director, strangled.
- Armand Mestral, 82, French actor and singer.
- Nicole Reinhart, 24, American cyclist, cycling accident.
- Dem Rădulescu, 68, Romanian actor, heart attack.
- Chico Salmon, 59, Panamanian baseball player (Cleveland Indians, Baltimore Orioles), heart attack.
- Bakht Singh, 97, Indian evangelist, Bible teacher and preacher
- Henry T. Weinstein, 76, American film producer.
- Paula Yates, 41, British television presenter and journalist, heroin overdose.

=== 18 ===
- Branko Becić, 76, Croatian Olympic rower (1948).
- Glyde Butler, 68, Australian politician.
- Gilbert Carpentier, 80, French television show producer.
- Tony Graboski, 84, Canadian ice hockey player (Montreal Canadiens).
- Dawn Langley Simmons, 77, English author and biographer, Parkinson's disease.
- Chen Yuefang, 37, Chinese basketball player and Olympic medalist (1984).

=== 19 ===
- John Beaumont, 76, American Olympic sports shooter (1956).
- William E. Bradley Jr., 87, American engineer and businessman.
- Joseph Epes Brown, 80, American scholar of Native American traditions.
- Pastor Coronel, 81, Paraguayan politician.
- Ann Doran, 89, American character actress.
- Fulvio Mingozzi, 74, Italian actor.
- Karl Robatsch, 70, Austrian chess player and botanist, throat and stomach cancer.
- Gloria Talbott, 69, American actress, kidney failure.

=== 20 ===
- Theresa Ahearn, 49, Irish politician, cancer.
- Willard Bascom, 83, American engineer, adventurer and scientist.
- Helmut Berthold, 89, German Olympic handball player (1936).
- Robert Craig, 78, American politician.
- Dorothy Emmet, 95, British philosopher and academic.
- Earnest Long, 72, American baseball player.
- Mona Moore, 83, British painter and illustrator.
- Jeanloup Sieff, 66, French photographer, cancer.
- Stanislav Stratiev, 59, Bulgarian playwright.
- Gherman Titov, 65, Soviet cosmonaut, heart failure (Vostok 2).

=== 21 ===
- Robert Wright Campbell, 73, American author and scriptwriter.
- Paul Cerutti, 89, Monegasque Olympic sports shooter (1972, 1976).
- Jacques Flynn, 85, Canadian lawyer and politician.
- Bengt Hambraeus, 72, Swedish-Canadian organist, composer and musicologist.
- Iskandar Khatloni, 45, Tajikistani writer and journalist, struck with an axe.
- Ognjen Petrović, 52, Serbian goalkeeper.
- Frederic Seaman, 94, Indian field hockey player and Olympic champion (1928).
- John Egerton, 6th Duke of Sutherland, 85, British aristocrat.

=== 22 ===
- Yehuda Amichai, 76, Israeli poet, cancer.
- Chris Bruusgaard, 90, Norwegian midwife.
- Dayanidhi Choudhury, 84, Indian conservationist.
- Willie Cook, 76, American jazz trumpeter, heart failure.
- Ian Cordial, 73, Scottish rugby union player.
- Vincenzo Fagiolo, 82, Italian Roman Catholic cardinal.
- Dov Feigin, 93, Israeli sculptor.
- Alexei Kostrikin, 71, Russian mathematician.
- Mike Nixon, 88, American football player, coach and scout.
- Anthony Read, 87, British Army general.
- Saburō Sakai, 84, Japanese flying ace during World War II, heart attack.
- Bill Sommers, 77, American baseball player (St. Louis Browns).
- Otto Walzhofer, 74, Austrian football player and coach.
- Johan Wiksten, 86, Swedish skier.

=== 23 ===
- Raoul Berger, 99, American legal scholar.
- Artur Burger, 57, Austrian pharmacist and pharmacognosist.
- Hanson Taylor Dowell, 94, Canadian ice hockey administrator and politician.
- Eiichi Kudo, 71, Japanese film director, cerebral hemorrhage.
- Václav Migas, 56, Czech international footballer.
- Aurelio Rodríguez, 52, Mexican Major League Baseball player, struck by a car.
- Carl Rowan, 75, American government official, journalist and author, heart and kidney ailments.
- Kenny Smith, 76, Canadian ice hockey player (Boston Bruins).

=== 24 ===
- Ken Barfield, 71, American football player (Washington Redskins).
- Basil Bernstein, 75, British sociologist.
- Janice Biala, 97, Polish-American artist.
- Dorr Bothwell, 98, American artist and designer.
- Jerry Claiborne, 72, American college football coach and player.
- Antony Darnborough, 86, British film producer and director.
- Marcel Lambert, 81, Canadian politician and Speaker of the House of Commons (1962-1963).
- Jean Malléjac, 71, French bicycle racer.
- Stephen McKeag, 30, Northern Irish loyalist paramilitary, drug overdose.
- Horacio Rivero, Jr., 90, Puerto Rican four-star admiral.

=== 25 ===
- Tom Baker, 79, British Anglican priest.
- Michael Dallat, 75, Irish bishop.
- Buster Matheney, 44, American basketball player, shot.
- Heberto Padilla, 68, Cuban poet, heart attack.
- Wilbur Frank Pell Jr., 84, American circuit judge (United States Court of Appeals for the Seventh Circuit).
- Tommy Reilly, 81, English musician.
- Edy Schmid, 89, Swiss field handball player and Olympic medalist (1936).
- R. S. Thomas, 87, Welsh poet.

=== 26 ===
- Neva Abelson, 89, American research physician (co-discovered the blood test for the Rh blood factor).
- Rowland Byers, 95, Irish rugby union player.
- Jaroslav Cháňa, 100, Czechoslovak football player.
- Philip Cheng, 20, Hong Kong jockey, head trauma from a fall during a race.
- Nick Fatool, 85, American jazz drummer.
- Paul Gouyon, 89, French cardinal of the Roman Catholic Church.
- Mohamed Suffian Mohamed Hashim, 82, Malaysian judge.
- Robert Lax, 84, American poet.
- Aleksandras Lileikis, 93, Lithuanian-American Holocaust perpetrator during World War II, heart attack.
- Richard Mulligan, 67, American actor (Soap, Empty Nest, Little Big Man), Emmy winner (1980, 1989), colorectal cancer.
- Baden Powell, 63, Brazilian guitarist, bacterial pneumonia.
- Carl Sigman, 91, American songwriter.

=== 27 ===
- Mario Arillo, 88, Italian naval officer.
- Joshua Russell Chandran, 82, Indian Christian theologian.
- Robert Chapman, 81, American playwright.
- Pablo Cuneta, 90, Filipino politician, cardiac arrest.
- David Jennens, 71, English rower and Olympian (1952).
- Sammy Luftspring, 84, Canadian boxer.
- Mickey Masini, 77, American football player (San Francisco 49ers, Los Angeles Dons).
- Isaac Oceja, 85, Spanish football player and coach.
- Frank Wills, 52, American security guard, discovered Watergate break-in, brain cancer.
- Oh Yun-kyo, 40, South Korean football player.

=== 28 ===
- Barbara Curthoys, 76, Australian feminist and communist activist.
- Phil Dougherty, 88, American football player (Chicago Cardinals).
- Ted Gehring, 71, American actor.
- Peter Gennaro, 80, American dancer and choreographer (Annie).
- V. E. Howard, 88, American minister and radio evangelist.
- Bob Layden, 80, American football player (Detroit Lions).
- Mike McKevitt, 71, American politician, member of the U.S. House of Representatives (1971-1973).
- Roger Nott, 91, Australian politician.
- Carlos Revilla, 67, Spanish voice actor, heart attack.
- Phot Sarasin, 95, Thai diplomat and politician.
- Pierre Trudeau, 80, Prime Minister of Canada, prostate cancer and Parkinson's disease.
- Gerd Vogeley, 75, German Olympic rower (1952).

=== 29 ===
- Alf Burrell, 77, Australian rules footballer.
- Walter Dieminger, 93, German space scientist.
- Myles Ferguson, 19, Canadian actor, traffic collision.
- Sir William Fry, 91, Australian politician.
- John Grant, 67, British politician, prostate cancer.
- Lynn Lovenguth, 77, American baseball player (Philadelphia Phillies, St. Louis Cardinals).
- Maningning Miclat, 28, Filipino poet and painter, suicide by jumping.
- Roger Régimbal, 78, Canadian politician, member of the House of Commons of Canada (1965-1968).
- Carlos Savage, 81, Mexican film editor and actor.
- Vidoje Žarković, 73, Yoguslav-Montenegrin communist politician.

=== 30 ===
- Sisir Kumar Bose, 80, Indian freedom fighter and writer.
- Besmilr Brigham, 87, American poet and writer, complications from Alzheimer's disease.
- Lina Bryans, 91, Australian modernist painter.
- Roger Bush, 82, British-born Australian Methodist minister and media personality.
- Victor Dauer, 91, American football and baseball coach.
- Rich Dimler, 44, American football player (Cleveland Browns, Green Bay Packers), pancreatitis.
- Iván Esperón, 88, Argentine football player and coach.
- Heikki Flöjt, 56, Finnish Olympic biathlete (1968).
- Zoran Gopčević, 45, Yugoslav water polo player and Olympian (1980).
- Ragnhild Michelsen, 89, Norwegian actress.
- Erno Paasilinna, 65, Finnish writer and journalist, cancer.
- Sir Fred Pontin, 93, English businessman.
- Luis Rubén di Palma, 55, Argentine racing driver, helicopter crash.
- Dennis Sandole, 87, American jazz guitarist, composer, and music educator.
- Joe Schmidt, 73, Canadian ice hockey player (Boston Bruins).
- Joe Sheridan, 85, Irish politician.
- Mario Valota, 82, Swiss fencer and Olympic medalist (1952).
- Palle Virtanen, 90, Finnish Olympic sprinter (1936).
- Joe Watson, 48, Australian football player, liver cancer.
- Joseph Weber, 81, American physicist, lymphoma.
- Howard Winstone, 61, Welsh boxer, kidney disease.
