= Pellissier =

Pellissier is a surname. Notable people with the surname include:

- Christophe Pélissier (businessman), or Pellissier, (1728–1779), French merchant
- Daniele Pellissier (1904–1972), French-Italian cross-country skier
- Gloriana Pellissier (born 1976), Italian ski mountaineer
- Guillaume Pellicier, or Pellissier, (c.1490–1568), French prelate and diplomat
- Jean Pierre Pellissier (1808–1867), missionary from the Paris Mission Society to Southern Africa
- Jean Pellissier (shepherd) (fl. 1308), shepherd in the Comté de Foix
- Jean Pellissier (ski mountaineer) (1972–2023), Italian ski mountaineer
- Sergio Pellissier (born 1979), Italian footballer
