= Jean Pellissier =

Jean Pellissier may refer to:

- Jean Pierre Pellissier (1808–1867), missionary from the Paris Mission Society to Southern Africa
- Jean Pellissier (shepherd) (fl. 1308), shepherd in the Comté de Foix
- Jean Pellissier (ski mountaineer) (1972–2023), Italian ski mountaineer
