= Ludwig Mayer =

Ludwig Mayer may refer to:

- Ludwig Mayer (bookseller)
- Ludwig Mayer (skier)

== See also ==
- Ludwig & Mayer, German type foundry
- Ludwig Meyer, psychiatrist
