= Władysław Żytkowicz =

Polish soldier and skier (1907–1977)

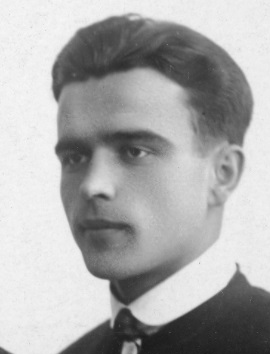

Personal information
- Born: January 15, 1907 Kościelisko, Poland
- Died: April 22, 1977 (aged 70) Hartford, Connecticut, United States

Sport
- Sport: Skiing
- Club: SN PTT-1907 Klub Sportowy Kemping Zakopane

Władysław Żytkowicz (January 15, 1907 – April 22, 1977) was a Polish soldier and skier.

== Biography ==
Żytkowicz was born in Zakopane. He was member of the SN PTT-1907 Klub Sportowy Kemping Zakopane, and primarily competed in the B-Class in 1923. As a soldier he took part at the military patrol demonstration events of the 1928 and 1936 Winter Olympics. The team of 1928 placed seventh and the team of 1936 placed ninth.

He placed third at the Polish national championship of ski jumping from 1927 to 1930 in a row and participated in the FIS Nordic World Ski Championships 1929. In 1931 he was national champion of Nordic combined.

Żytkowicz was an officer in the Polish Army active in the defense of Poland against the Nazi German invasion of September 1939, and retreated with the army across the border to neighboring Romania after the Soviet Union also invaded Poland on 17 September as an ally of Germany. He made his way to French-administered Syria, where the Polish forces regrouped as the Independent Carpathian Brigade, later crossing into British-administered Palestine when France capitulated to Germany. He saw action at Tobruk, Libya, and served in the Italian campaign against Germany as part of the Polish Second Corps under General Władysław Anders.

After the end of hostilities, he managed to smuggle his young family out of Soviet-occupied Poland to Italy, and together they were transferred with the Polish Army to England, where he was demobilized. He emigrated with his wife, Stanislawa, and daughters Anna, Maria and Kinga, to Hartford, Connecticut.
