= Zubek =

Zubek is a Polish surname. Notable people with the surname include:

- John Zubek (1925–1974), Canadian psychologist
- Józef Zubek (1914–1988), Polish soldier
- Marek Zúbek (born 1975), Czech footballer
- Mark Zubek (born 1974), Canadian record producer
