= Kuvaja =

Kuvaja is a Finnish-language surname. Notable people with the surname include:

- Eino Kuvaja (1906–1975), Finnish Major and skier
- Jukka Kuvaja (born 1953), Finnish skier
- Pekka Kuvaja (1921–2003), Finnish cross country skier
- Chloe Kuvaja (born 2002), American Aquaculturist
- Jason Kuvaja (born 1975) American Maine Blueberry cannabis breeder and artist. Landshark Genetics owner
