= Bajart =

Bajart is a French surname. Notable people with the surname include:

- Léonce Bajart (1888–1983), French sportsman, writer, resistance fighter
- Lionel Bajart (born 1979), Flemish Belgian politician
- Pierre Bajart (1914–unknown), Belgian long-distance runner
