= Duncan MacPherson =

Canadian ice hockey player (1966–1989)

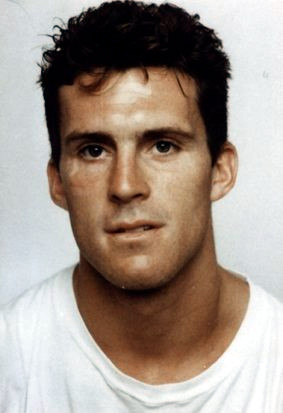
- A passport photograph of MacPherson, taken a few weeks before his death
- Born: February 3, 1966 Saskatoon, Saskatchewan, Canada
- Died: August 9, 1989 (aged 23) Stubai Glacier Resort, Austria
- Height: 6 ft 1 in (185 cm)
- Weight: 195 lb (88 kg; 13 st 13 lb)
- Position: Defenceman
- Shot: Left
- Played for: Springfield Indians; Indianapolis Ice
- NHL draft: 20th overall, 1984; New York Islanders
- Playing career: 1986–1989

Duncan Alvin MacPherson (February 3, 1966 – August 9, 1989) was a Canadian professional ice hockey player. In 1989, he went on a trip to Austria, and then disappeared. Searches proved fruitless, until 2003 when his body was found in a melting glacier. His death remains officially unsolved.

== Early life and career ==
MacPherson was born in Saskatoon, Saskatchewan. A standout defenceman for the Saskatoon Blades of the Western Hockey League, he was drafted in the first round, 20th overall, of the 1984 NHL entry draft by the New York Islanders. He played minor league hockey for the Springfield Indians of the American Hockey League and the Indianapolis Ice of the International Hockey League.

== Disappearance ==
In the summer of 1989, MacPherson went to Europe. The New York Islanders had bought out and released the often injured MacPherson. MacPherson had intentions of taking a job as a player-coach for a semi-pro hockey team in Dundee, Scotland, commencing in August 1989. Despite having a bad feeling about the entrepreneur Ron Dixon who was backing the Scottish team, he travelled to central Europe alone in early August 1989. The plan was to visit old friends and see the sights before going on to Scotland.

He was scheduled to arrive in Dundee on August 12. When he did not show up, his family went to look for him. A car he had borrowed from a friend was discovered six weeks later in the parking lot of the Stubaital ski-region resort at the foot of the Stubai Glaciers in the Stubai Alps in Austria, where he had rented a snowboard. His last known contact was with an employee of the ski resort on August 9, who reported that he spoke with MacPherson, and last saw MacPherson departing alone to perhaps squeeze in some final snowboarding and hiking before nightfall.

In 2003, 14 years after MacPherson disappeared, an employee of the Stubai Glacier Resort discovered a glove sticking out of the ice of the melting Schaufelferner Glacier (one of the Stubai Glaciers' arms), in the middle of the ski run, where MacPherson's body had lain frozen.

== Theories ==
According to John Leake, author of Cold a Long Time: An Alpine Mystery, MacPherson's body was found to have suffered significant trauma, including amputation of arms, hands and legs. Leake believed the damage was consistent with rotating machinery; his snowboard also had a uniform pattern of damage and was cut apart, and Leake took this to indicate that it too had gone through a machine. Leake's conclusion was that MacPherson had a snowboard accident and injured his leg, and was lying on the slope waiting for rescue. During that very foggy day, a snowcat driver did not see MacPherson and ran him over by accident, killing him. Leake surmised that instead of reporting it, the snowcat driver (or his supervisor) buried MacPherson in the shallow crevasse. His body stayed hidden there for fourteen years, until the glacier melted enough for it to be seen.

== Career statistics ==
			Regular season					Playoffs
Season	Team	League	GP	G	A	Pts	PIM	GP	G	A	Pts	PIM
1982–83	Battleford Barons	SJHL	59	6	11	17	215	—	—	—	—	—
1982–83	Saskatoon Blades	WHL	5	2	4	6	16	2	0	0	0	0
1983–84	Saskatoon Blades	WHL	45	0	14	14	74	—	—	—	—	—
1984–85	Saskatoon Blades	WHL	69	9	26	35	116	3	0	0	0	4
1985–86	Saskatoon Blades	WHL	70	10	54	64	147	13	3	8	11	38
1986–87	Springfield Indians	AHL	26	1	0	1	86	—	—	—	—	—
1987–88	Springfield Indians	AHL	74	5	14	19	213	—	—	—	—	—
1988–89	Springfield Indians	AHL	24	1	5	6	69	—	—	—	—	—
1988–89	Indianapolis Ice	IHL	33	1	4	5	23	—	—	—	—	—
WHL totals			189	21	98	119	353	18	3	8	11	42
AHL totals			124	7	19	26	368	—	—	—	—	—

== See also ==
- List of ice hockey players who died during their careers
- List of solved missing person cases: 1950–1999
- List of unsolved deaths

Preceded by Gerald Diduck	New York Islanders first-round draft pick 1984	Succeeded by Brad Dalgarno
