= Tschurtschenthaler =

Tschurtschenthaler is a surname. Notable people with the surname include:

- Agnes Tschurtschenthaler (born 1982), Italian runner
- Eugen Tschurtschenthaler (1912–1974), Austrian skier
