= Dens Park =

Football stadium in Dundee, Scotland

- Dens
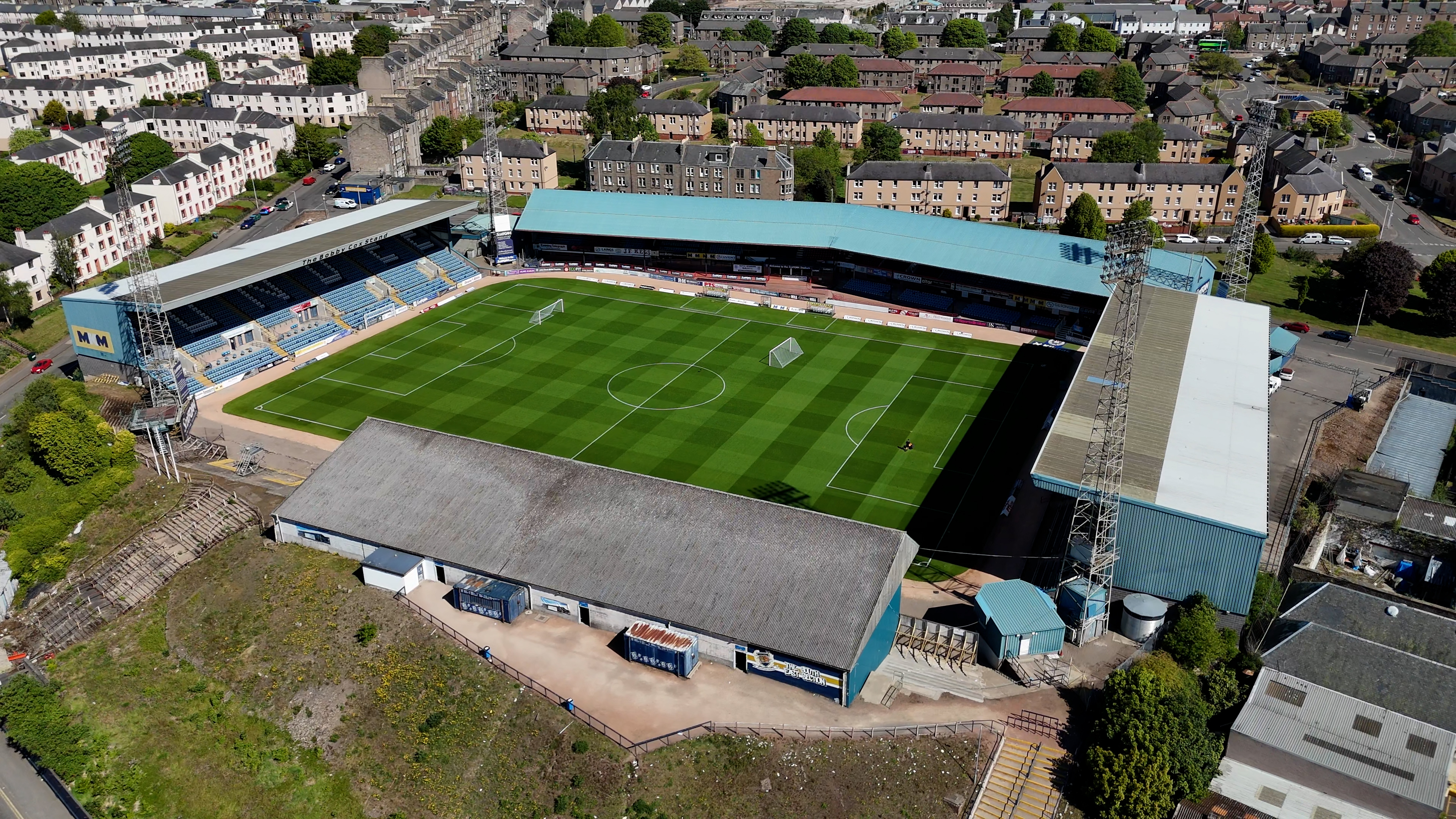
- Dens Park in 2025

- Location in Dundee
- Location: Sandeman Street, Dundee
- Coordinates: 56°28′29″N 2°58′25″W
- Capacity: 11,775
- Surface: Grass pitch
- Record attendance: 43,024 v Rangers; 7 February 1953
- Field size: 109 × 69 yards (100 × 64 metres)

Construction
- Groundbreaking: 1899
- Opened: 1899
- Renovated: 1998–1999
- Architect: James Paul Associates (1998–99)

Tenant
- Dundee F.C.: 1899–present

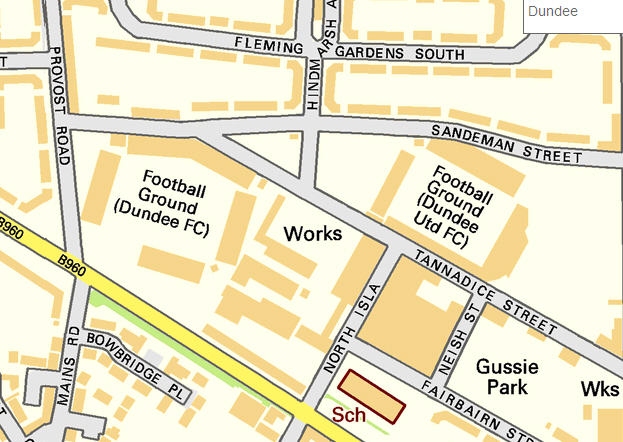
Map showing the proximity of Dens Park (left) and Dundee United FC's stadium Tannadice Park (right)

Dens Park is a football stadium in Dundee, Scotland, which is the home of Scottish Premiership club Dundee F.C. and has a capacity of 11,775. Tannadice Park, the home of rivals Dundee United, is just 200 yards (183 metres) away.

== History ==
Dundee moved to "Dens" from their first stadium at Carolina Port in 1899. Dens Park hosted three full international matches involving the Scotland men's team, in March 1904, March 1908, and December 1936. All three games were Home Internationals against Wales. The record attendance at Dens Park is 43,024, which was set in 1953 when Dundee played host to Rangers in the Scottish Cup.

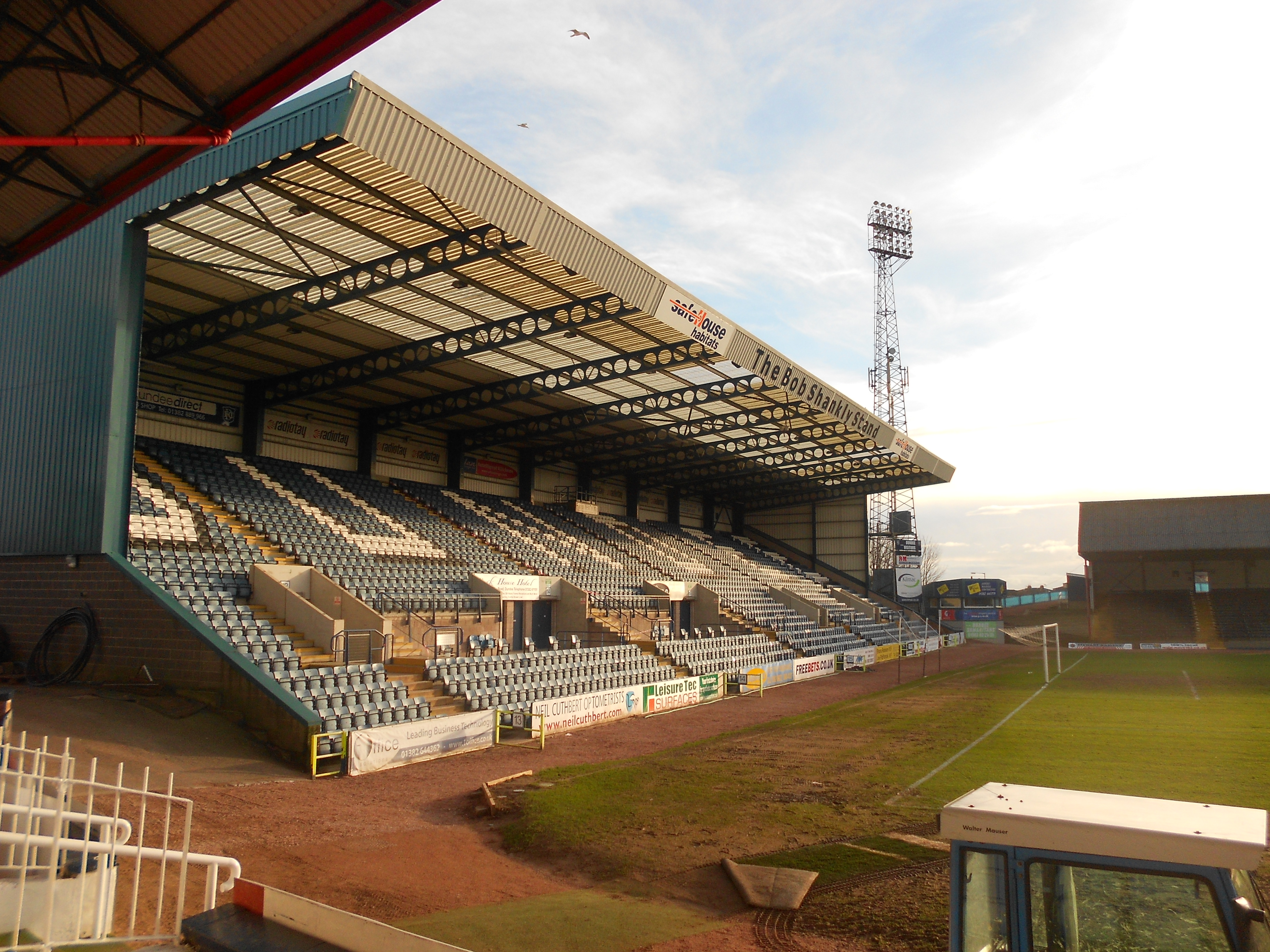
View of the 'Bob Shankly Stand'

Following Dundee's promotion to the newly-founded Scottish Premier League in 1998, Dens Park had to be redeveloped to meet SPL seating capacity rules. Existing concrete terraces on the eastern and western ends of the ground were removed and two 3,000-seat stands were built in a record time of 82 days for the start of the 1998–99 season. The near-identical single-tier stands were named to honour Bobby Cox and Bob Shankly; the former usually houses home supporters while the latter houses the away fans. A new club shop and ticket office were also built. Undersoil heating was installed in 2005. Dens Park was named best pitch in the First Division in 2008.

Dens Park has also hosted Scottish League Cup finals, in 1979–80 and 1980–81, and the Scottish Challenge Cup final in 2007–08. Also in 2007, Dens Park (along with McDiarmid Park in Perth) hosted European Under-19 elite round qualifying games between Scotland, Portugal, Turkey and Georgia.

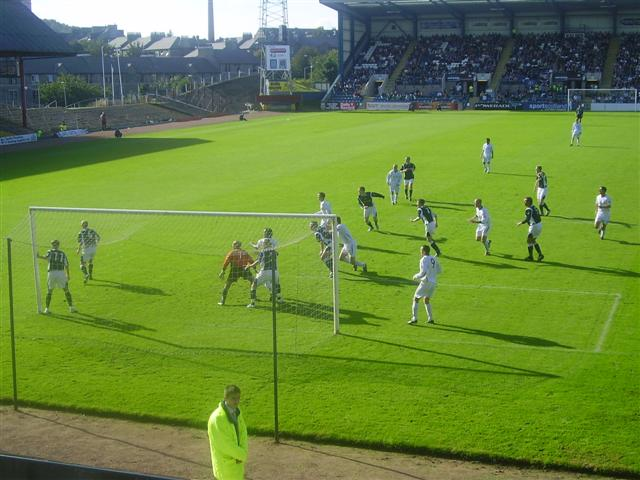
Dundee F.C. playing St Johnstone F.C. at Dens Park during the 2006–07 season

The ground hosted its first Scotland women match in July 2023, a friendly against Northern Ireland.

In October 2023, Dundee announced that the stadium would be sponsored by insulation company Scot Foam, with the stadium being officially renamed to The Scot Foam Stadium at Dens Park. This sponsorship ended in June 2025, when the stadium returned to the name Dens Park.

== Potential development / relocation ==
In 2002, plans were drawn up for a new stadium to be built in the city as part of Scotland's bid to host UEFA Euro 2008. This stadium would have been shared by Dundee and near-neighbours Dundee United, which would have required the two to leave their historic grounds at Dens Park and Tannadice Park respectively. The stadium was planned for construction on a new site at Caird Park in the north-east of the city. Scotland was not successful in their bid, however, and so these plans were postponed, but could have been resurrected had Scotland launched a successful bid for another tournament in that period. Both clubs strongly oppose a ground-sharing agreement but were interested in a new arrangement that would have taken place if Ukraine and Poland had failed to meet UEFA's expectations for hosting UEFA Euro 2012.

In May 2009, it was reported that the stadium is owned by local businessman John Bennett. In October 2014, Dundee Supporter's Society announced they have put forward plans to then club chairman Bill Colvin which may allow the club to buy back the stadium from Bennett. They also expressed, this was not a plan to enable the Supporter's Society to own the Stadium but for the club themselves, they said they will "simply administer the scheme". In April 2015, Colvin announced that negotiations were taking place to buy back the Stadium from current owner John Bennett and his company Sandeman Holdings. Dundee FC completed the purchase of the stadium from John Bennett in October 2023.

In August 2016, club owners John Nelms and Tim Keyes were reported to have bought land in the Camperdown area on the north-western periphery of the city, next to the Dundee Ice Arena. It was then made clear in February 2017 that the plan for this land was to develop a new stadium for the club due to the increasing maintenance costs of Dens Park, although plans for a move were described by Nelms as being "early doors" in a video interview published on the club's website. Documents related to the proposed new stadium were submitted in August 2017, ahead of a formal planning application.

In June 2022, Dundee moved their day-to-day operations away from Dens Park and into Dundee and Angus College's Gardyne Campus located in the east of the city with the intent to improve the sports facilities there, although revised plans for the Camperdown stadium were released both around the same time and at the end of 2023.

== Other uses ==
=== Greyhound racing ===
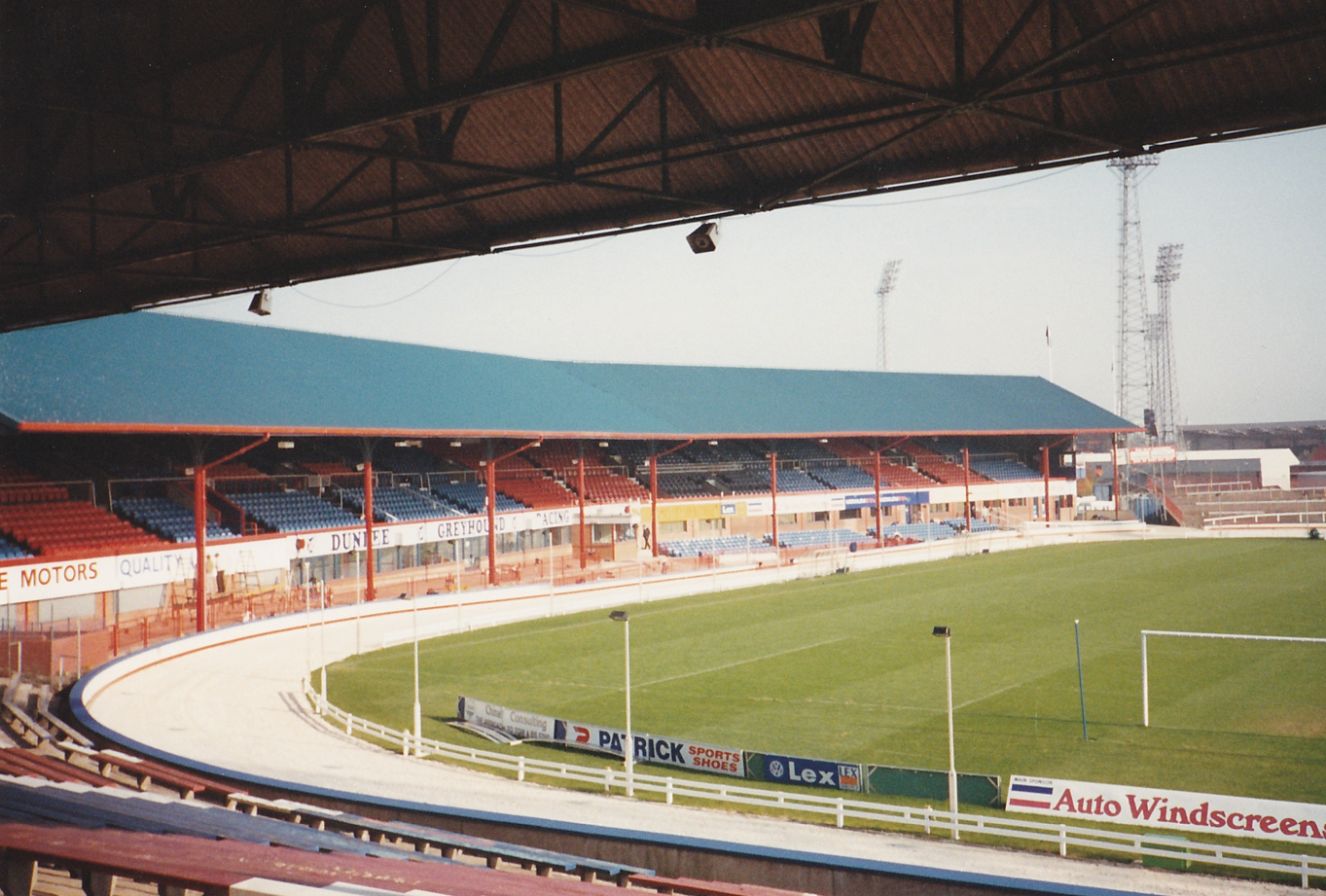
Greyhound racing track, c. 1995

In 1932 Dundee FC agreed a lease with the Dundee Greyhound Racing Company Ltd for a period of ten years for a nominal capital of £25,000. The first night of greyhound racing took place on 9 November 1932 with grass having replaced the existing cinder running track and the main grandstand was fitted out with a glass front to allow patrons the ability to watch racing in all weathers. This new facility also contained a refreshment counter and a totalisator booth. A large totalisator board was erected on the Dens Road side of the ground.

John Jolliffe a private trainer moved to Scotland in 1932 and took over as General and Racing Manager at Dens Park for a period of three years before moving onto the larger Holburn Stadium in Aberdeen in 1935. He introduced selling races at the track and the racing took place under National Greyhound Racing Club (NGRC) rules. Distances raced over were 260, 450, 460 and 650 yards. Greyhound racing ended at the end of May 1936 due to the liabilities of the company resulting in a winding up order. In 1937 an attempt to start racing nearby at the East Craigie F.C. ground failed due to local protests.

The second period of racing came over fifty years later in 1992 when Ron Dixon arrived at the football club. The Canadian businessman owned a company called Dundee Leisure and was the new chairman of the football club. He secured planning permission for a greyhound track and new car parking facilities with further plans to build a new stand, a conference centre and an ice rink on site. The 400-metre circumference sand greyhound track was constructed and a Bramwich Hare was installed in addition to a Datatote totalisator system. Racing started on 21 October 1994 under the management of Eddie Ramsay but Dixon's vision never materialised with the greyhound racing ending on 11 December 1996; the ground was soon redeveloped with its new stands positioned parallel to the football pitch, ending the curved design.

== See also ==
- Scotland national football team home stadium
