= Tuppurainen =

Tuppurainen is a Finnish surname.

== Notable people ==
- Allu Tuppurainen (born 1951), Finnish actor and screenwriter
- Jani Tuppurainen (born 1980), Finnish ice hockey player
- Kalle Tuppurainen (1904–1954), Finnish skier
- Timo Tuppurainen (1973-), Finnish musician
- Ville Tuppurainen (born 1988), Finnish Nordic combined skier
