= Josef Rehm =

German skier

- Born: 1902
- Died: 1 July 1944 (aged 41–42)

Josef Rehm (1902 – 1 July 1944) was a German skier. He competed in the military patrol at the 1928 Summer Olympics. He was killed in action during World War II.
