= Witów, Tatra County =

Witów
- Village
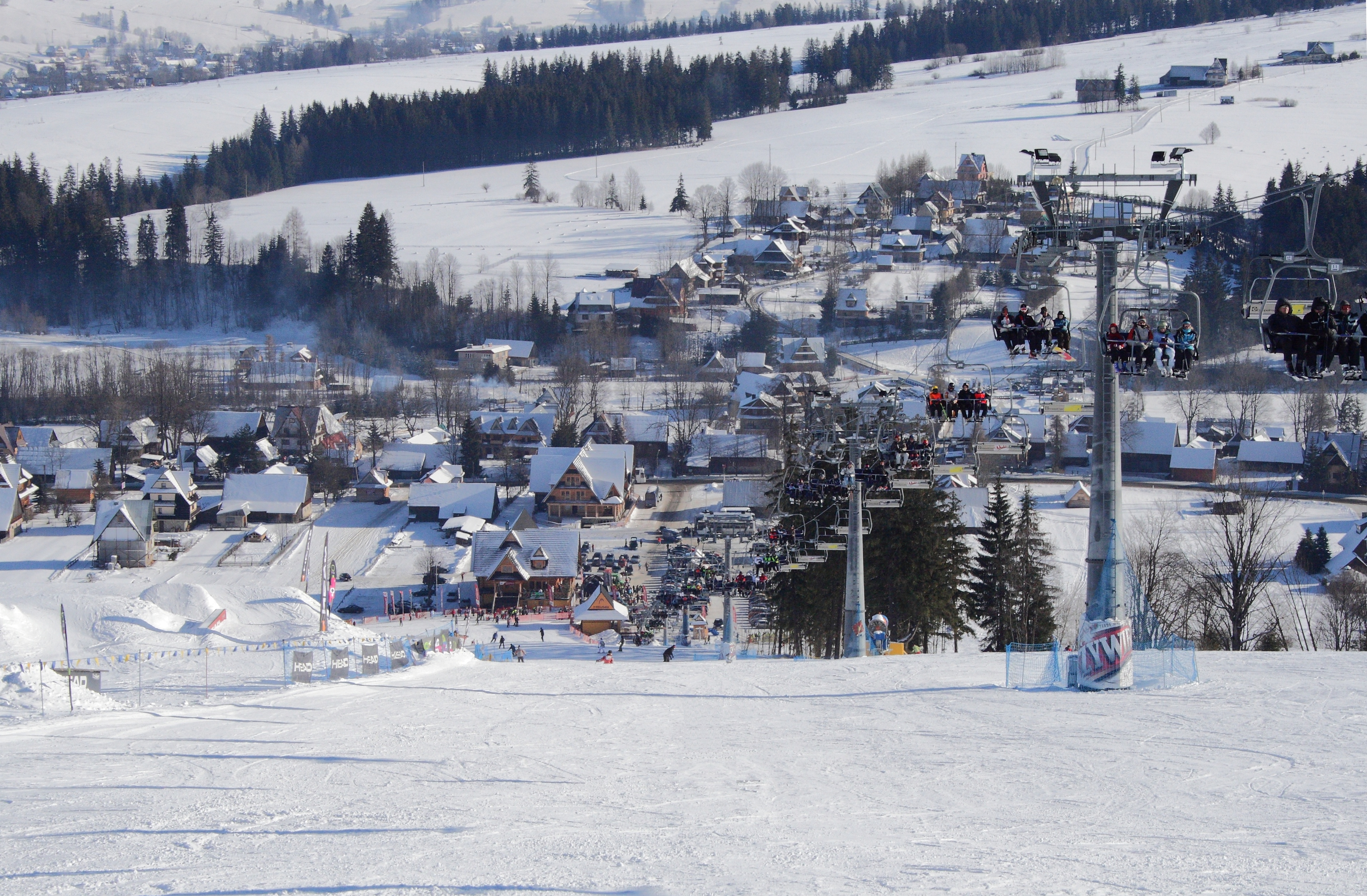
- General view of the village in winter

- Location within Poland
- Coordinates: 49°19′35″N 19°49′26″E
- Country: Poland
- Voivodeship: Lesser Poland
- County: Tatra
- Gmina: Kościelisko
- Population: 1,500

Witów [ˈvituf] is a village in the administrative district of Gmina Kościelisko, within Tatra County, Lesser Poland Voivodeship, in southern Poland, close to the border with Slovakia.

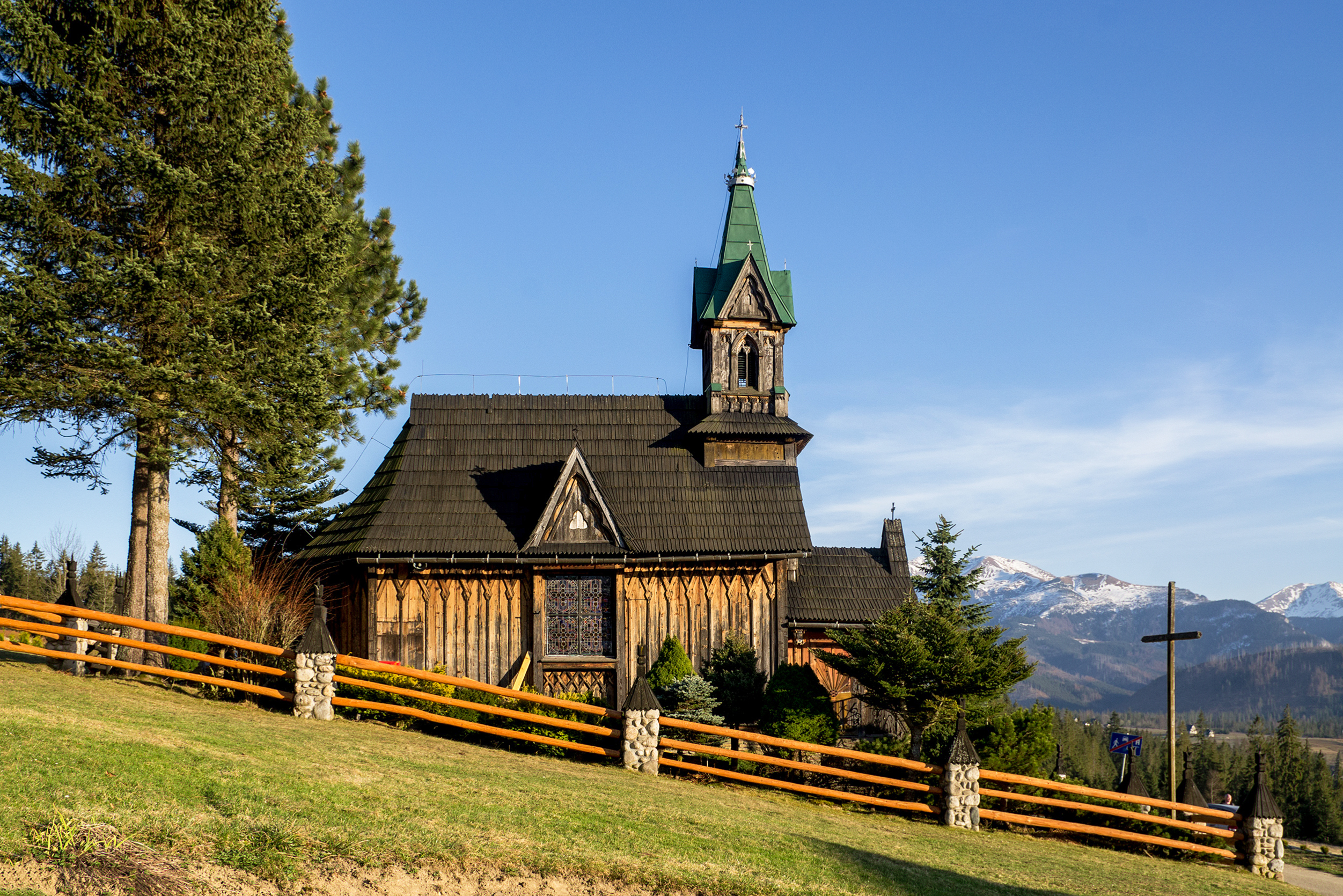
Chapel of Saint Anne in Płazówka
