= Michael Kirchmann =

German skier

- Born: 14 August 1914; Oberstaufen, German Empire
- Died: 15 November 1942 (aged 28) near Volkhov, Russian SFSR, Soviet Union

Michael Kirchmann (14 August 1914 – 15 November 1942) was a German skier. He competed in the military patrol at the 1936 Summer Olympics. He was killed in action during the Siege of Leningrad.
