= Arnold Käch =

Swiss military officer, skier, and writer

Personal information
- Born: 4 February 1914 Bern, Switzerland
- Died: 24 November 1998 (aged 84) Calgary, Alberta, Canada

Sport
- Sport: Skiing

Arnold Käch (4 February 1914 – 24 November 1998) was a Swiss military officer, skier, ski official and writer.

== Biography ==
Käch was born in Bern. His father was the engineer Arnold Otto Käch, and his mother was Berta Käch, née Scholl. He studied jurisprudence at the universities of Lausanne, Bern, Paris, in the United States and Canada after 1933, and got his license to practice law in 1939. During his years of studies, he was a leader in the rank of a Leutnant of the national Olympic military patrol team in 1936 which placed seventh. On 9 January 1937 he won the first Citadin race in Mürren From 1939 to 1940, he worked as a lawyer at the Federal Department of Economic Affairs, afterward as an assistant of the Swiss military and air attaché in Berlin, and after 1943 as military and air attaché in Stockholm, Oslo, and Copenhagen. Meanwhile, he married Louisa Hendrika Jeannette Wagemans in 1941. From 1 July 1947 to 1957 he was the first director of the Eidgenössische Turn- und Sportschule (ETS) Magglingen as an officer, General Staff, and was engaged in its increasing to today's federal office of sports BASPO. From 1951 to the middle of 1961 he was secretary general of the International Ski Federation. For his publishing work he was awarded with the Sports Award for artists in 1957. From 1957 to 1979, he was director of the Federal Military Administration, was advanced to the rank of Brigadier in 1957, and served additionally as the commander of Border Brigade 11 from 1967 to 1972.

Käch was a member of the Swiss Olympic Association and of the Commission for Assignments of Tasks between Federation and Cantons. After 1983 he was guest of honor at the yearly international SAS competitions of pentathlon. He died in Calgary.

== Publications ==
- Weisse Abenteuer. Heitere Erlebnisse eines Ski-Vagabunden in Europa und Amerika. Amstutz & Herdeg, Zürich 1939
