= Gmina Kościelisko =

Gmina Kościelisko Kościelisko Commune
- Gmina
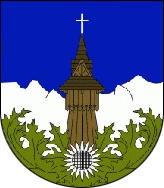
- Coat of arms
- Interactive map of Gmina Kościelisko
- Coordinates (Kościelisko): 49°17′27″N 19°53′18″E
- Country: Poland
- Voivodeship: Lesser Poland
- County: Tatra
- Seat: Kościelisko

Area
  - Total: 136.37 km^{2} (52.65 sq mi)

Population (2006)
  - Total: 8,035
  - Density: 58.92/km^{2} (152.6/sq mi)
- Website: http://www.koscielisko.com.pl

Gmina Kościelisko is a rural gmina (administrative district) in Tatra County, Lesser Poland Voivodeship, in southern Poland, on the Slovak border. Its seat is the village of Kościelisko, which lies approximately 5 kilometres (3 mi) west of Zakopane and 86 km (53 mi) south of the regional capital Kraków.

The gmina covers an area of 136.37 square kilometres (52.7 sq mi), and as of 2006 its total population is 8,035.

On February 17th, 2025, the lowest temperature recorded in Poland, being −41.1 °C (−42.0 °F), was recorded in Litworowy Kocioł, which is part of the gmina.

== Villages ==
The gmina contains the villages of Dzianisz, Kościelisko and Witów.

== Neighbouring gminas ==
Gmina Kościelisko is bordered by the town of Zakopane and by the gminas of Czarny Dunajec and Poronin. It also borders Slovakia.
