= Herman Klynveld =

South African politician (1833–1907)

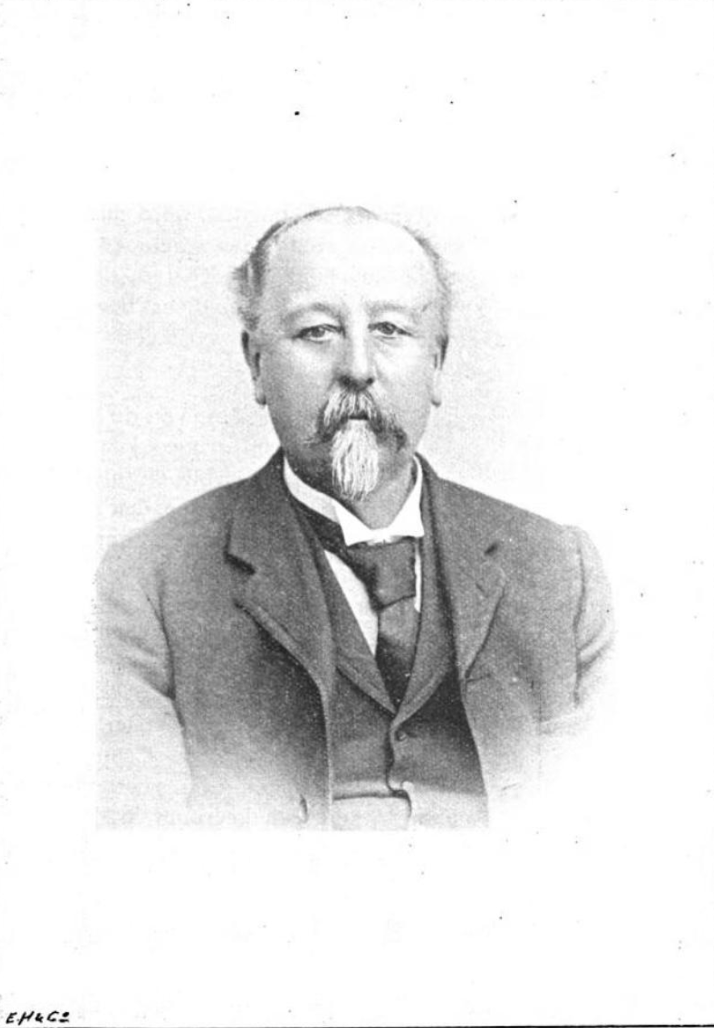

Member of the Volksraad of the Orange Free State
- In office 1871–1907

Personal details
- Born: 8 July 1833 Amsterdam, The Netherlands
- Died: 21 June 1907 (aged 73) Bethulie, Orange Free State Province
- Resting place: Bethulie Main Cemetery, Orange Free State Province
- Spouse: Charlotte Caroline Pellissier
- Occupation: Attorney, politician

Hermanus Klijnveld (8 July 1833 – 21 June 1907), commonly known as Herman Klynveld, was a Dutch-born South African advocate notable for his significant contributions as a member of the Volksraad in the Orange Free State (Oranje Vrijstaat), a Boer republic in Southern Africa.

His diplomatic efforts shaped the political landscape of the region during a pivotal era. Initially opposed to the construction of the railway between Bloemfontein and Cape Town, Klynveld nevertheless played a significant role in its eventual development. Klynveld also played a role in the protest against the annexation of diamond fields by the Cape Colony, and was involved in efforts to strengthen ties with the neighbouring Transvaal. His diplomatic acumen was particularly highlighted during his appointment to advise the Transvaal government in response to the Jameson Raid, demonstrating his importance in the political and legal spheres of the Boer republics.

== Early life and education ==
Herman Klynveld was born in Amsterdam, Netherlands. He spent his early years receiving education in his hometown. From the age of nine to sixteen, he attended a boarding school in Beverwijk. Initially intended for theological studies, Klynveld showed no interest in the field and instead was employed in a trading office. He was fluent in English, Dutch, and French.

== Emigration to South Africa ==
In October 1859, Klynveld emigrated to South Africa, arriving in Cape Town in January 1860. After a brief stay, he traveled to Colesberg where he worked at the law firm of Dirk Sluiter, a fellow countryman, for eighteen months. During his time in Colesberg, he passed the Free State attorneys' exam.

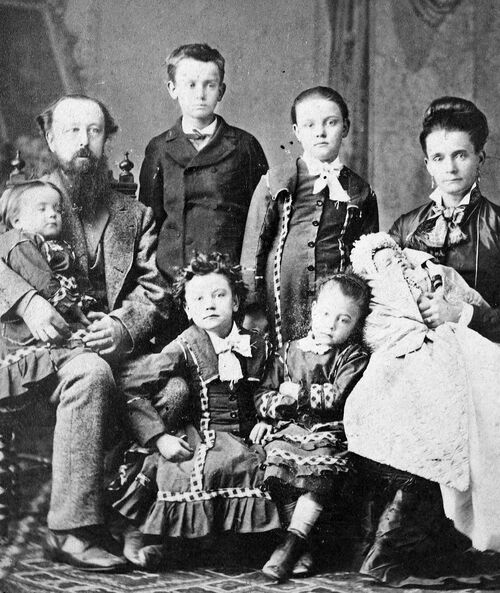

On 1 September 1861, Klynveld settled in Bethulie, a small farming town in the Orange Free State where he practiced as an attorney. In April of the same year, he married Charlotte Caroline Pellissier, daughter of missionary Jean Pierre Pellissier. They had a large family, including eight children.

== Professional and public life ==
He opened a successful law firm in Bethulie and participated actively in matters that had an impact on the community. He also worked as a clerk of the magistrate's court, public prosecutor, mayor, translator, and acting magistrate. From 1879, he served as the chairman of the Bethulie Town Council.

== Political career ==
Klynveld's political career began in earnest in 1871 when he was elected to the Volksraad, the legislative assembly of the Orange Free State. He served on various committees tasked with the protest against the Cape Colony's annexation of diamond fields, toll associations, railways, and union with the Transvaal. He was known for his clear and eloquent speaking, common sense, and independent mindset, which made him influential in the Volksraad. He was a strong supporter of President Reitz, and later President Marthinus Theunis Steyn. In 1896, under Steyn's administration, he was appointed with Abraham Fischer to advise the Transvaal government regarding the Jameson Raid, an event that heightened regional tensions.

In 1887, during a period of public unrest triggered by President Johannes Brand's resignation – a result of misunderstandings and disputes within the Volksraad – Klynveld encountered a notable situation. He was erroneously associated with the crisis, leading to a symbolic protest in which his effigy was burned in a coffin during a mock funeral at Bloemfontein's Market Square. Despite the dramatic nature of the event, it was reportedly conducted in good spirits.

As a member of the Executive Council of the Free State, he decided, along with the president, to declare war against the British Empire, which ushered in the Anglo-Boer War.

== Later years and legacy ==
In 1897, Klynveld celebrated his 25th anniversary as a member of the Volksraad and was honored with a gold snuff box by his colleagues. By 1900, his health had declined, limiting his participation in council actions. Nevertheless, during crucial decisions regarding the Free State's alliance with the Transvaal during the Boer War, Klynveld remained an active and vital figure until his death in 1907 in Bethulie. Following the war, Klynveld returned to Bethulie and resumed his legal practice.

Throughout his life, Klynveld's actions and decisions had a profound impact on the Orange Free State and its residents, demonstrating a steadfast commitment to his adopted country through both peaceful legislative contributions and during times of conflict.
