= Enrico Silvestri =

Italian Alpini officer and skier (1896–1977)

Personal information
- Born: 12 May 1896 Turin, Italy
- Died: 24 June 1977 (aged 81) Rome, Italy

Sport
- Sport: Skiing

Enrico Silvestri (12 May 1896 – 24 June 1977) was an Italian Alpini officer and skier.

Silvestri, born in Turin, was the leader of the military patrol team, which placed 4th at the 1928 Winter Olympics. In 1934 he was transferred to the new founded mountain warfare school of the Italian Army called Scuola Militare di Alpinismo (today: Centro Addestramento Alpino). At the Trofeo Mezzalama in 1935 he and his team colleagues Carlo Ronc and Attilio Chenoz finished first. In the rank of a capitano he led again the military patrol team at the 1936 Winter Olympics, which won the gold medal.

In the end of World War II, tenente colonnello Silvestri joined the Italian resistance movement and served in the partisan Division Garibaldi, from the middle of January 1944 to the end of 1944 in the 6th S.A.P. brigade, and from January until 7 July 1945 in the 19th Garibaldi brigade "Eusebio Giambone".

== Publications ==
- "Lo sci agonistico: allenamento e gare", Milano, 1943
