= Albert Bach =

- Born: November 29, 1910; Treffen
- Died: July 11, 2003 (aged 92); Graz
- Military career
- Allegiance: First Republic of Austria; Nazi Germany; Second Republic of Austria
- Branch: Bundesheer (1931–1938); Heer (1938–1945); Bundesheer (1956–1972)
- Rank: Leutnant (Bundesheer); Oberstleutnant (Heer); General der Infanterie (Bundesheer)
- Units: Infanterieregiment Nr. 7 Gebirgsjäger regiment 139; 3rd Mountain Division; 30th Infanterie-Division
- Conflicts: Austrian Civil War; World War II
- Awards: Iron Cross; Gold Decoration

Albert Bach (November 29, 1910 – July 22, 2003) was an Austrian Nazi, soldier, at last in the rank of a Generalmajor, and skier. In 1936 he was also leader of the national Olympic military patrol team, which finished fourth at the 1936 Winter Olympics.

== Biography ==
Bach was born in Treffen, a son of a farmer. After visiting the Realgymnasium in Villach, he joined the former Bundesheer on September 1, 1931. On October 26, 1931, he became a member of the NSDAP (No. 612,639). He also was a member of the NS-Soldatenring. On September 30, 1932, he passed his officer training in Enns and at the Theresian Military Academy in Wiener Neustadt. For his deployment during the Austrian Civil War he was awarded with the Bronze Medal for Service to the Republic of Austria. On September 1, 1935, he was advanced to the rank of a Leutnant, and transferred to the Infanterieregiment Nr. 7 (infantry regiment) in Klagenfurt.

=== Service in the German Wehrmacht during World War II ===
On March 13, 1938, he was assumed by the German Wehrmacht, got the rank of an Oberleutnant and was company commander in the Gebirgsjäger regiment 139 in Villach. In the beginning of 1939 he was chosen for the general staff officer training at the Kriegsakademie, but he could not take part because of the beginning of World War II. During the Invasion of Poland he served as an ordnance officer in the Gebirgsjägerregiment 139. In January 1940 he was transferred to the staff of the 3rd Mountain Division for the general staff officer pre-training. For his engagement during the Battles of Narvik he was awarded with the Iron Cross, both classes. From autumn of 1940 to 1941 in the rank of a Hauptmann he visited the general staff officer training at the Kriegsakademie in Berlin. During the Balkans Campaign he served as liaison officer of the 12th Army, and took part in the preparation for the Battle of Crete, which he later observed in order of Generalfeldmarschall Wilhelm List. During the campaign against the Soviet Union in 1941 he was 2nd general staff officer of the 30th Infanteriedivision. He held this position until August 1942, and was involved in the Demyansk Pocket, although he became 1st general staff officer of an army corps in spring of 1942 formally, he was made Major i. G. in November of the same year, and took part in the defence battles in Demyansk. In May 1943 he became 1st general staff officer of the 30th Infanterie-Division, was advanced to the rank of an Oberstleutnant i. G. and also awarded with the Golden German Cross, and was deployed in separate battles in north-western Russia. After September 1944 he served as 1st general staff officer of the 16th Army in the battles of Riga and in Courland, before he was captured by the Soviets on May 9, 1945. Shortly before and after the declaration of German independence of the provisional Austrian government (April 27, 1945), he became Oberst and Commander in Chief of the 16th Army.

=== Service in the Bundesheer of the second Austrian Republic ===
In the end of July 1948 he was released and worked at his brother-in-law's firm in Sankt Johann im Pongau. He joined today's Bundesheer on July 26, 1956, where he served primarily as leader of the organization department of the BMLV (Federal Ministry of Defence) in the rank of Oberstleutnant (VB), after March 14, 1957 Oberstleutnant (dhmD). On May 1, 1958, he became deputy leader of the Section II under General Erwin Fussenegger, and was advanced to the rank of Oberst (dhmD) on January 1, 1959. On July 1, 1961, he became commander of the new Staff Academy (today Landesverteidigungsakademie) in Vienna. On July 15, 1963, he was made Commander in Chief of the Group II (Styria and Carinthia), became Generalmajor on January 1, 1964, and General der Infanterie on January 1, 1969.

Bach could not agree with the planned 1970 Federal Army Reform and asked for his retirement in 1972. He was awarded for his services with the Gold Decoration for Service to the Republic of Austria, and was retired on January 1, 1973. He died in Graz.

The concerns of the Austrians about the constitution of their future security policy is the consequence of deficiency in information about the real requirements of Austria's security for decades.

— A. Bach

== Awards ==
- Bronze Medal for Services to the Republic of Austria
- Iron Cross, 1st and 2nd classes
- German Cross in Gold on 29 October 1943 as Major im Generalstab in the General Staff of the 30. Infanterie-Division
- Honour Ring of Styria (No. 048)
- Decoration in Gold for Services to the Republic of Austria
