= Gerald Diduck =

Canadian ice hockey player (born 1965)

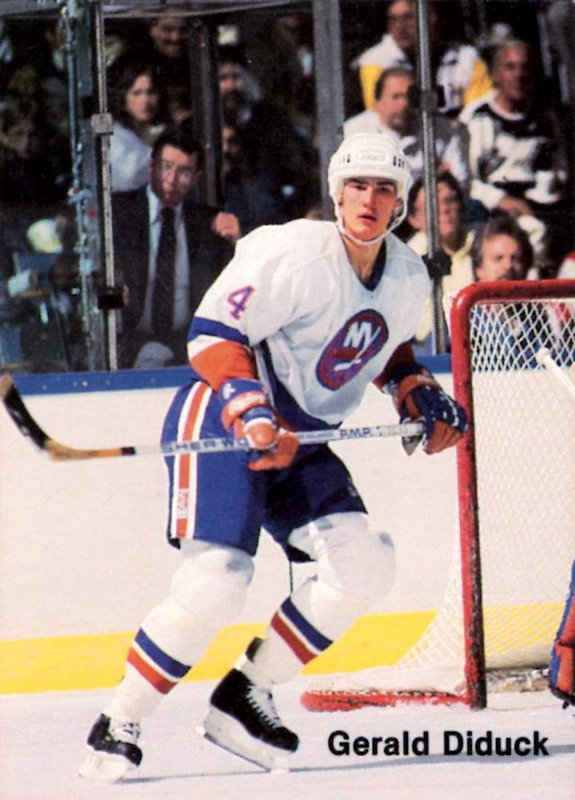
- Born: April 6, 1965 (age 61) Edmonton, Alberta, Canada
- Height: 6 ft 1 in (185 cm)
- Weight: 225 lb (102 kg; 16 st 1 lb)
- Position: Defence
- Shot: Right
- Played for: New York Islanders; Montreal Canadiens; Vancouver Canucks; Chicago Blackhawks; Hartford Whalers; Phoenix Coyotes; Toronto Maple Leafs; Dallas Stars
- NHL draft: 16th overall, 1983; New York Islanders
- Playing career: 1984–2001

Gerald Mark Diduck (/ˈdɪdək/ DID-ək; born April 4, 1965) is a Canadian former professional ice hockey defenceman. He was drafted in the first round, 16th overall, by the Islanders in the 1983 NHL entry draft. Diduck played 932 games in an NHL career that spanned eight different teams from 1984 to 2001. He played for the New York Islanders, Montreal Canadiens, Vancouver Canucks, Chicago Blackhawks, Hartford Whalers, Phoenix Coyotes, Toronto Maple Leafs and Dallas Stars. He is part of hockey lore as the man who ended the career of Islanders legend and teammate Bob Nystrom with an accidental high stick that almost cost Nystrom his eye. Diduck was born in Edmonton, Alberta and now resides in Texas. He is the brother-in-law of professional musician and CKY bassist Matt Deis. Diduck is of Ukrainian ancestry.

== Career statistics ==
=== Regular season and playoffs ===
			Regular season					Playoffs
Season	Team	League	GP	G	A	Pts	PIM	GP	G	A	Pts	PIM
1981–82	Lethbridge Broncos	WHL	71	1	15	16	81	12	0	3	3	27
1982–83	Lethbridge Broncos	WHL	67	8	16	24	151	20	3	12	15	49
1982–83	Lethbridge Broncos	MC	—	—	—	—	—	3	0	1	1	2
1983–84	Lethbridge Broncos	WHL	65	10	24	34	133	5	1	4	5	27
1983–84	Indianapolis Checkers	CHL	—	—	—	—	—	10	1	6	7	19
1984–85	New York Islanders	NHL	65	2	8	10	80	—	—	—	—	—
1985–86	New York Islanders	NHL	10	1	2	3	2	—	—	—	—	—
1985–86	Springfield Indians	AHL	61	6	14	20	173	—	—	—	—	—
1986–87	New York Islanders	NHL	30	2	3	5	67	14	0	1	1	35
1986–87	Springfield Indians	AHL	45	6	8	14	120	—	—	—	—	—
1987–88	New York Islanders	NHL	68	7	12	19	113	6	1	0	1	42
1988–89	New York Islanders	NHL	65	11	21	32	155	—	—	—	—	—
1989–90	New York Islanders	NHL	76	3	17	20	163	5	0	0	0	12
1990–91	Montreal Canadiens	NHL	32	1	2	3	39	—	—	—	—	—
1990–91	Vancouver Canucks	NHL	31	3	7	10	66	6	1	0	1	11
1991–92	Vancouver Canucks	NHL	77	6	21	27	229	5	0	0	0	10
1992–93	Vancouver Canucks	NHL	80	6	14	20	171	12	4	2	6	12
1993–94	Vancouver Canucks	NHL	55	1	10	11	72	24	1	7	8	22
1994–95	Vancouver Canucks	NHL	22	1	3	4	15	—	—	—	—	—
1994–95	Chicago Blackhawks	NHL	13	1	0	1	48	16	1	3	4	22
1995–96	Hartford Whalers	NHL	79	1	9	10	88	—	—	—	—	—
1996–97	Hartford Whalers	NHL	56	1	10	11	40	—	—	—	—	—
1996–97	Phoenix Coyotes	NHL	11	1	2	3	23	7	0	0	0	10
1997–98	Phoenix Coyotes	NHL	78	8	10	18	118	6	0	2	2	20
1998–99	Phoenix Coyotes	NHL	44	0	2	2	72	3	0	0	0	2
1999–2000	Toronto Maple Leafs	NHL	26	0	3	3	33	10	0	1	1	14
2000–01	Dallas Stars	NHL	14	0	0	0	18	—	—	—	—	—
NHL totals			932	56	156	212	1612	114	8	16	24	212

=== International ===
Year	Team	Event	GP	G	A	Pts	PIM
1984	Canada	WJC	7	0	0	0	4

Preceded by Pat LaFontaine	New York Islanders first-round draft pick 1983	Succeeded by Duncan MacPherson
