= Military patrol at the 1928 Winter Olympics =

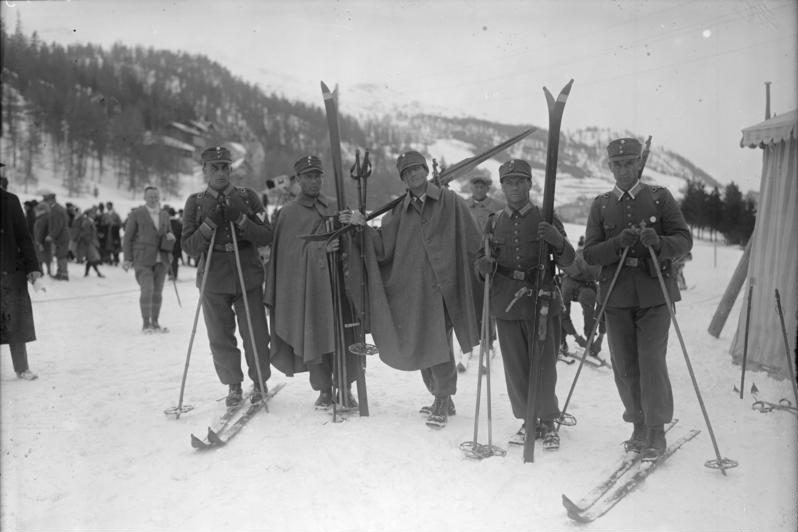
The German team.

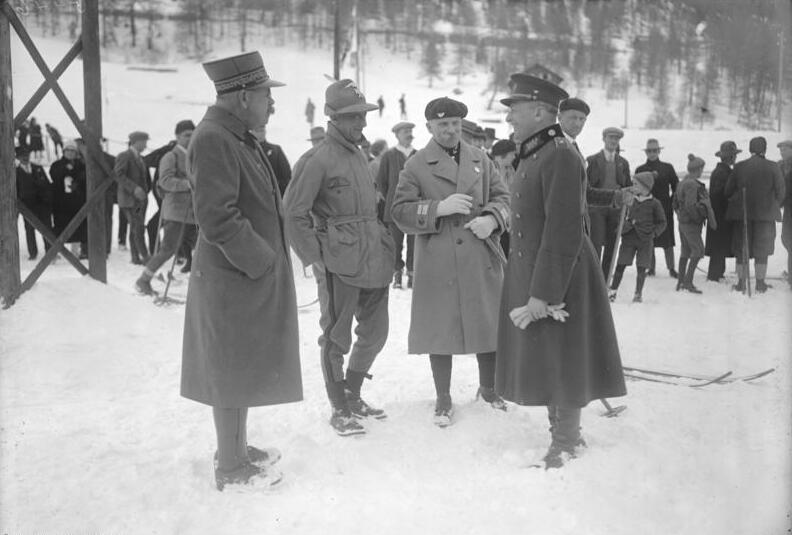
Referees from France, Italy, Switzerland and Poland

At the 1928 Winter Olympics, in St. Moritz, Switzerland, a military patrol competition was held. Because of a snowstorm the night before the competition, the start of the event was delayed 45 minutes to the cleaning up of the track. The competition was contested over a 30 km (19 mi) distance with an elevation difference of 1,100 m (3,600 ft). The starting point was on a height of 2,108 m (6,916 ft), the highest point at 2,877 m (9,439 ft), and the goal in the valley at 1,850 m (6,070 ft). Nine countries with 36 military patrol runners participated in this event.

The event was held on Sunday, February 12, 1928. It was originally to be a full Olympic event, but its status was downgraded to that of demonstration sport.

Place	Team	Time
1	Norway (Ole Reistad, Leif Skagnæs, Ole Stenen, Reidar Ødegaard)	3:50:47
2	Finland (Eino Hjalmar Kuvaja, Kalle Tuppurainen, Esko Järvinen, Veikko Hannes Ruotsalainen	3:54:37
3	Switzerland (Franz Kunz, Hugo Lehner, Otto Furrer, Anton Julen)	3:55:04
4	Italy (Enrico Silvestri, Daniele Pellissier, Erminio Confortola, Piero Maquignaz)	4:07:30
5	Germany (Franz Raithel, Stefan Kistler, Josef Rehm, Ludwig Mayer)	4:15:02 ½
6	Czechoslovakia (Otakar Německý, Josef Klouček, Jan Bedřich, Robert Möhwald)	4:15:07 ½
7	Poland (Zbigniew Wóycicki, Władysław Żytkowicz, Władysław Czech, Tadeusz Zaydel)	4:39:45
8	Romania (Toma Calista, Constantin Pascu, Ioan Rucăreanu, Ion Zăgănescu)	5:00:16
9	France (Marcel Pourchier, R. Mandrillon, R. Gindre, M. Perrier)	5:20:26
