= Sisto Scilligo =

Italian Alpini soldier and skier

Sisto Michele Scilligo (21 November 1911 – 16 April 1992) was an Italian Alpini soldier and skier.

Scilligo was born in the Val Formazza. In 1931 he placed second in the 18 km cross-country skiing event of the Italian mastership. Two years afterwards he finished fifth together with his team colleges Frederico De Zulian, Andrea Veurich and Severino Menardi at the 4x10 km relay event of the FIS Nordic World Ski Championships 1933, and was a member of the national Olympic military patrol team, which placed first at the 1936 Winter Olympics.

Scilligo served at the mountain warfare school of the Italian Army called Scuola Militare di Alpinismo (today: Centro Addestramento Alpino), which was founded in 1934.

Further notable results were:

- 1931: 2nd, Italian men's championships of cross-country skiing, 18 km
- 1935: 2nd, Italian men's championships of cross-country skiing, 46 km
