= Dzianisz =

- Village
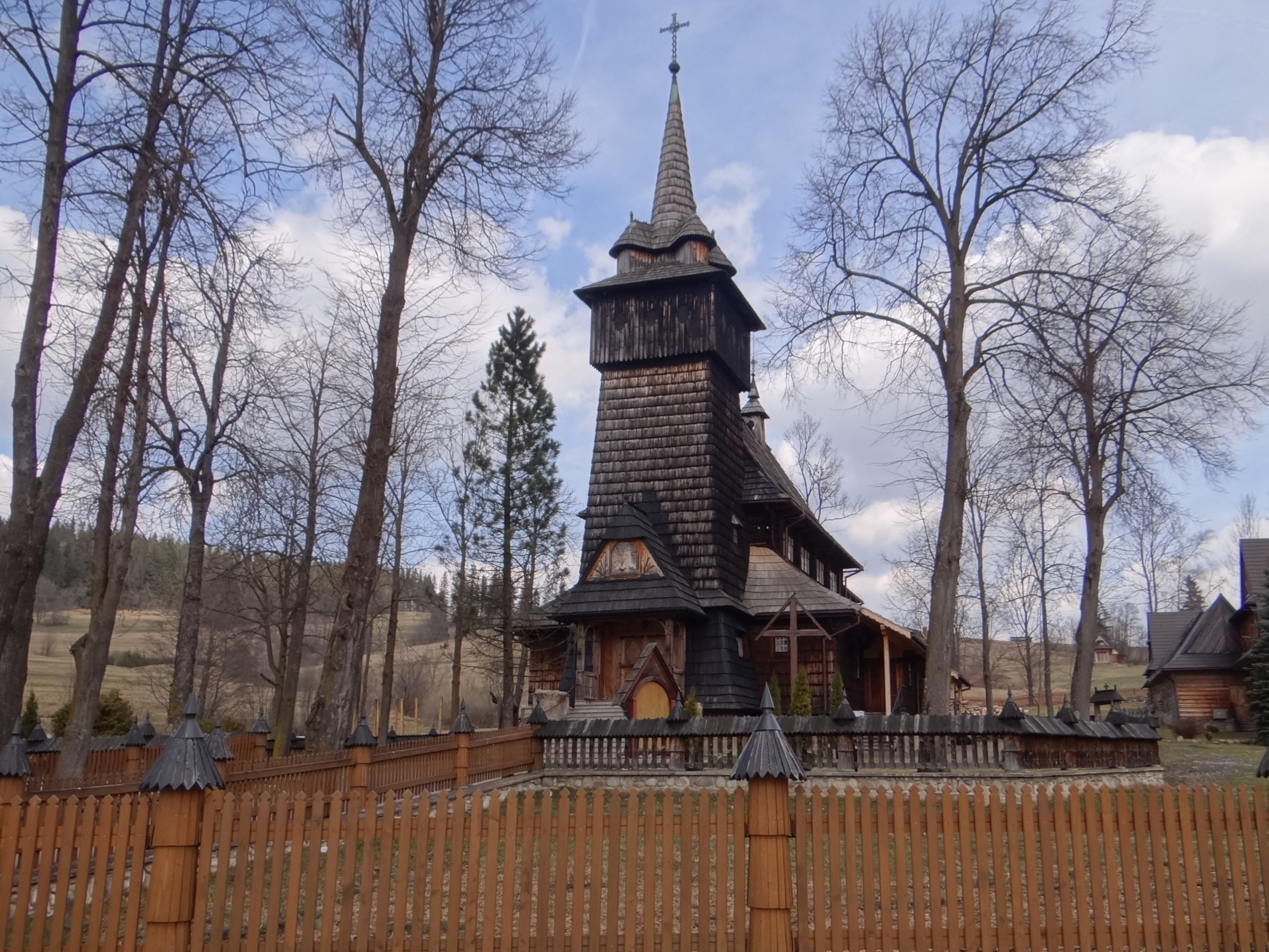
- Church of Our Lady of Częstochowa

- Location within Poland
- Coordinates: 49°19′53″N 19°52′2″E
- Country: Poland
- Voivodeship: Lesser Poland
- County: Tatra
- Gmina: Kościelisko
- Population: 1,800
- Website: http://www.koscieliska.pl/odzian.html

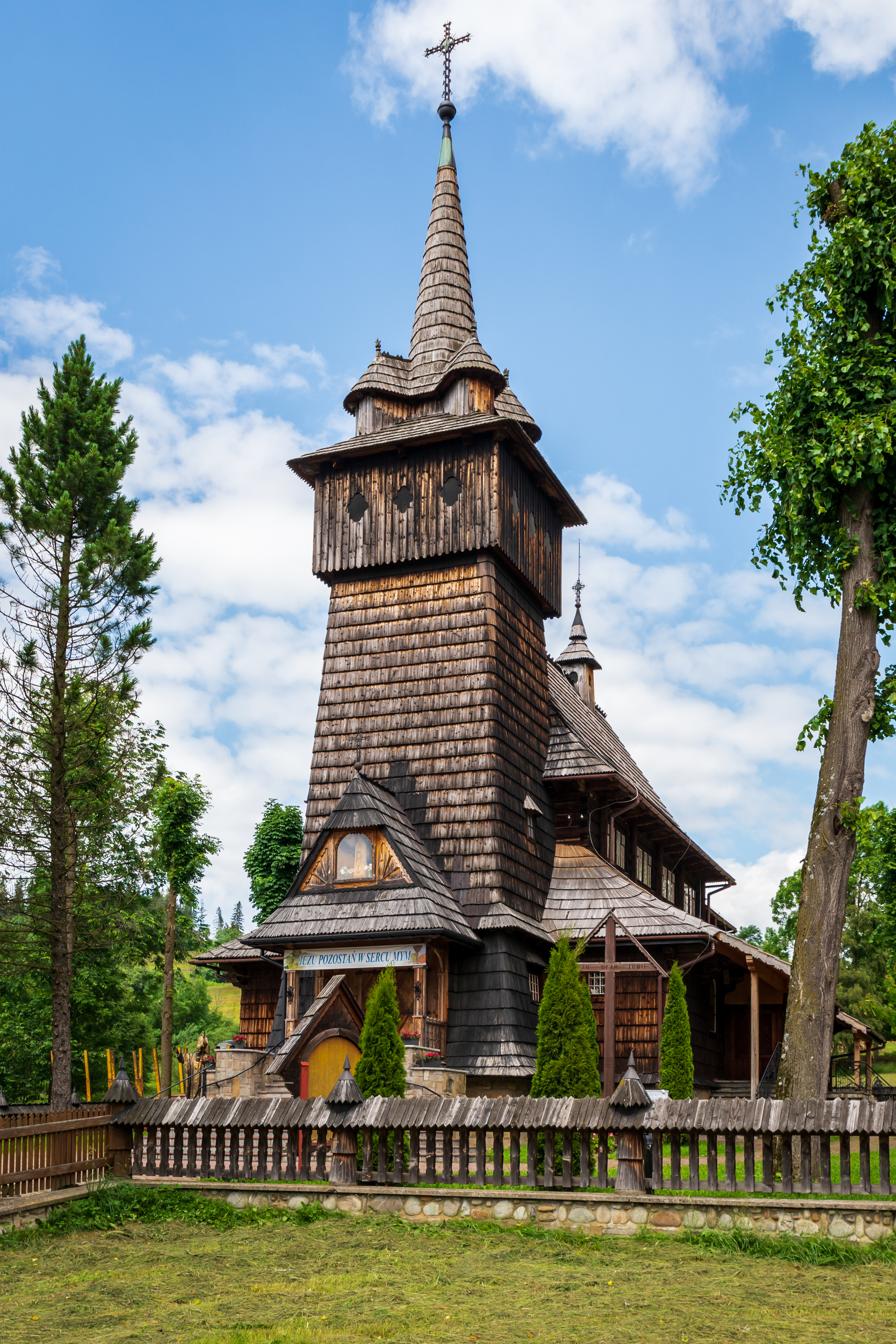
Church of Our Lady of Częstochowa on a summer day

Dzianisz [ˈd͡ʑaniʂ] is a village in the administrative district of Gmina Kościelisko, within Tatra County, Lesser Poland Voivodeship, in southern Poland, close to the border with Slovakia.
