= Military patrol at the 1936 Winter Olympics =

At the 1936 Winter Olympics, in Garmisch-Partenkirchen, Germany, in 1936, a military patrol competition was held. The International Olympic Committee refused admission of this sport into the Olympic Program, but the expressed desires of Adolf Hitler forced the IOC to make this program a demonstration sport. Military patrol is considered the precursor to biathlon.

The success of the Italian team was honored by Benito Mussolini with 30,000 lira per participant, because it was the first time that the Italians placed first in Nordic skiing at the Olympics.

Event held on February 14, 1936

Place	Team	Time
1	Italy (Enrico Silvestri, Luigi Perenni, Stefano Sertorelli, Sisto Scilligo)	2:28:35.0
2	Finland (Eino Kuvaja, Olli Remes, Kalle Arantola, Olli Huttunen)	2:28:49.0
3	Sweden (Gunnar Wåhlberg, Seth Olofsson, Johan Wiksten, Johan Westberg)	2:35:24.0
4	Austria (Albert Bach, Edwin Hartmann, Franz Hiermann, Eugen Tschurtschenthaler)	2:36:19.0
5	Germany (Herbert Leupold, Hans Hieble, Hermann Lochbühler, Michael Kirchmann)	2:36:24.0
6	France (Jacques Faure, Marcel Cohendoz, Eugène Sibué, Jean Morand)	2:40:55.0
7	Switzerland (Arnold Käch, Josef Jauch, Eduard Waser, Josef Lindauer)	2:43:39.0
8	Czechoslovakia (Karel Šteiner, Josef Matěásko, Bohuslav Musil, Bohumil Kosour)	2:50:08.8
9	Poland (Władysław Żytkowicz, Jan Pydych, Józef Zubek, Adam Rzepka)	2:52:27.0
