= Star Club de Caudry =

Football club in France

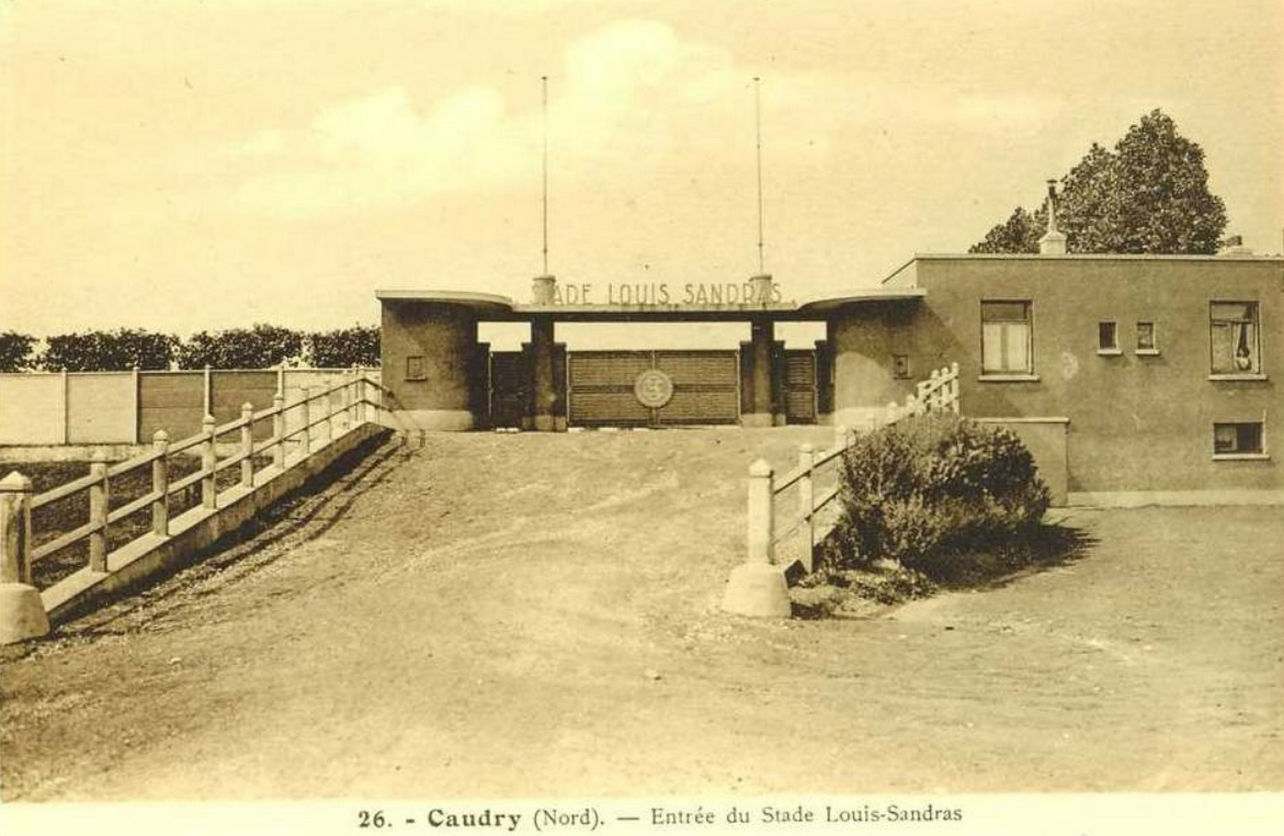
- Entrance to the Louis-Sandras Stadium
- Full name: Star Club caudrésien
- Short name: SC Caudry
- Founded: 1903
- Dissolved: 1967
- Ground: Stade Louis-Sandras
- League: FCAF Football Championship

The Star Club caudrésien, better known as Star Club de Caudry, was a football team based in Caudry that existed between 1903 and 1967. It disappeared in 1967 by merging with US Viesly to give birth to Star Union.

== History ==
=== Early history ===
In 1903, several residents of Caudry, including the 15-year-old Léonce Bajart, founded the Star Club de Caudry, which was exclusively dedicated to football. The club colors were sky and dark blue, and its coat of arms featured a six-pointed star. During the first thirty years, the Star Club teams played on a fenced field (at first little more than a pasture) next to the local water reservoir.

The club initially joined the French Amateur Cycling Federation (Fédération Cycliste des Amateurs de France, FCAF), one of the national football associations that co-existed with others at the time. On 16 May 1909, SC Caudry won the final of the FCAF Football Championship after defeating the Association sportive d'Alfortville, the champions of the Paris region, by a score of 4–2. This victory allowed the club to qualify for the Trophée de France in 1909, which pitted the champions of the different federations against each other, and the Caudry club had to face AS Bons Gars de Bordeaux, champion of the FGSPF, but the match did not take place because the travel costs were too high for Caudry, so the FCAF then decides to register JA Saint-Ouen in its place, although the club had not yet played a match under its new federation.

In 1913, the Star Club joined the Union des Sociétés Françaises de Sports Athlétiques (USFSA), a much larger federation than the FCAF, and in the following year, the club won its Division Nord B. After the First World War, the football section of the USFSA joined the French Football Federation (1919), founded in April 1919.

=== 1930s ===
In 1935, thanks mainly to the patronage of its club president Louis Sandras, the club received a stadium that was, for the time, extremely modern with a covered seating area and grass drainage, which was named after him and was called Stade Louis-Sandras until the 21st century. It was inaugurated with a women's international match between France and Belgium, and half a century later, on 23 March 1987, it was again the scene of an international match, when the French women defeated their Northern Irish opponents 2–0.

In the Coupe de France, Star Club reached the round of 32 of the competition three times, being eliminated in 1922–23 by Racing Calais (0–2), then in 1933–34 and 1935–36 by two professional clubs, respectively Le Havre AC (1–5), and SC Fives, a resident of the First Division, shockingly holding them to a 0–0 draw, but then losing in the replay by a score of 0–6 at the Stade Félix Virnot in Mons-en-Barœul. Despite its low attendance for a town of 13,000 inhabitants, the Star Club was able to apply for the 1936–37 Third Division, thanks to "the massive aid of the municipality, which financed more than half of the budget". SC Caudry was chosen along with nine other clubs from the north of France, including US Tourcoing, Racing Arras, and SC Abbeville, finishing in seventh place. His players received a fixed salary of 200 Francs per month, a tenth of the maximum that the FFFA allowed at the time, plus a bonus of 25 for a draw or 30 Francs for a victory; this level of salary meant that all the players had to work outside of football. The following year, however, the federation decided to suspend this D3, thus bringing Caudry back to the amateur ranks and to its place in the regional championships. Except for this brief experience of professionalism in 1936–37, the Caudry club remained an amateur club playing at a regional level.

=== Decline and collapse ===
In 1967, SC Caudry merged with US Viesly, a modest club from a neighboring village, in order to form "Star Union", which failed to rise to the French Amateur Championship, and following the team's relegation to the 1st departmental division in 1972, the club was dissolved, with US Viesly regaining its independence. In 2012 and 2013, the town's historical museum organized an exhibition on the Star Club.

Two years after the merger with Viesly, the town of Caudry saw the founding of a new football club: Entente sportive de Caudry, which considers itself the successor to Star Club. The club still exists in the 21st century, and as of 2017–18, it plays in Regional 4, and its reserve team in D2.

== Notable players ==
The club's most renowned footballer was Émilien Méresse, who went on to play professionally for Fives and Lille, with whom he won the 1945–46 French Division 1, and even earning an international cap for the French national team in a friendly match against Yugoslavia at Parc des Princes, which ended in a 1–0 loss.

== Honours ==
- Champion of FCAF: 1909
- North Division B Champion (USFSA): 1914
- Champion of the Division of Honor North B (FFFA): 1923, 1924, 1925, and 1926

== Biography ==
- Berthou, Thierry (1999). Dictionnaire historique des clubs de football français [Historical dictionary of French football clubs] (in French). Créteil: Pages de Foot. ISBN 2-913146-01-5.
