= Marcel Pourchier =

French military officer and member of the French Resistance (1897–1944)

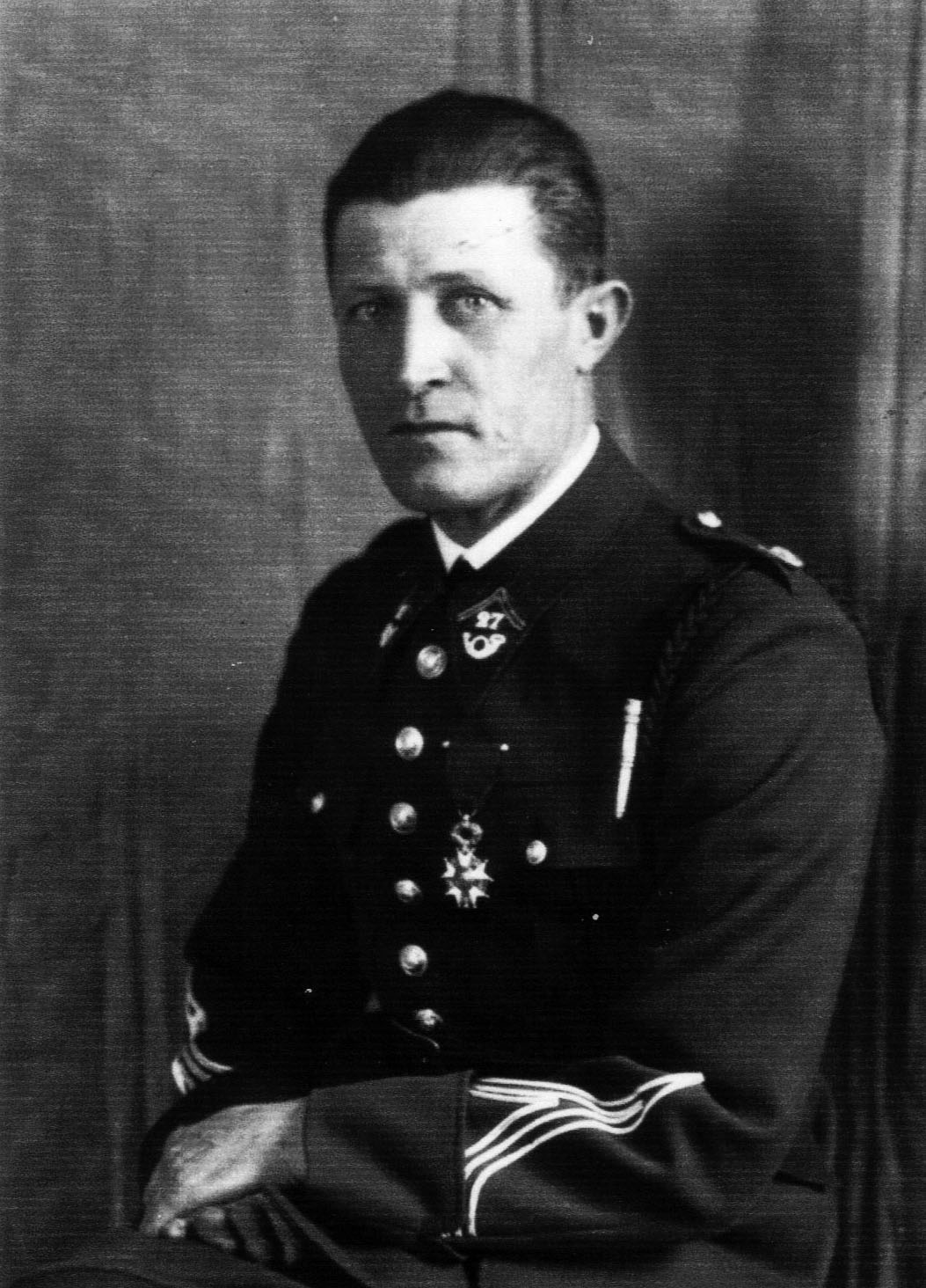
- Portrait, 1935
- Born: André Eugène Marcel Pourchier; 1 June 1897; Beuil, France
- Died: 1 September 1944 (aged 47); Natzweiler-Struthof, Germany
- Military career
- Allegiance: France
- Branch: French Army
- Service years: 1916–1944
- Rank: Lieutenant-colonel (posthumously)
- Commands: École de Haute Montagne
- Conflicts: World War I World War II
- Awards: Officer of the Legion of Honour; Croix de guerre 1914–1918; Croix de guerre des TOE; Croix de guerre 1939–1945; Médaille de la Résistance

André Eugène Marcel Pourchier (French pronunciation: [maʁsɛl puʁʃje]; 1 June 1897 – 1 September 1944) was a French military officer whose last rank was lieutenant-colonel. In World War II, he was a member of the French Resistance. Captured by German occupying forces, he was killed in Germany.

== Biography ==
Pourchier was born in Beuil, Alpes-Maritimes. He was a Chasseurs Alpins soldier and a member of his hometown's winter sports club, which was founded in 1924. As a Lieutenant, he was the leader of the national military patrol team at the 1928 Winter Olympics (demonstration event), which finished last.

In 1930 he designed the first ski jumping hill in Beuil. Because of his expertise, he was made the first commander and captain of the newly founded French mountain warfare school École de Haute Montagne (EHM) in Chamonix in 1932. The school was founded for the special training of the ski reconnaissance platoons, which were founded in 1930. During his time at the EHM, he created new techniques of ski warfare, methods of training, and clothing for mountain warfare. He recruited Pierre Dalloz, an engineer who supported his drawings of detailed alpine maps after 1941. During World War II while active with the French Resistance he was captured in Nice by the German Gestapo. He was transferred to the concentration camp Natzweiler-Struthof where he was killed.

In his hometown, his name is listed on a war memorial and a boulevard is named after him: Boulevard Marcel-Pourchier.

== Bibliography ==
- Marcel Pourchier, Edouard Frendo: La Technique de l'Alpinisme, Arthaud, 1943.
- J.-P. Martin: Jusqu’au bout du devoir . Le Lieutenant-Colonel Marcel POURCHIER, in Les Cahiers des Troupes de Montagne, No. 17, June 1999, pp. 30–38.
- Pierre Dalloz: Vérités sur le drame du Vercors, Paris, 1979, Chap. 3.
