= Edwin Hartmann =

Austrian soldier and skier

Personal information
- Born: October 3, 1910
- Died: March 9, 1996 (aged 85)

Sport
- Sport: Skiing
- Club: Garnisonssportvereinigung
Medal record
Representing Austria

Edwin Hartmann (October 3, 1910 – March 9, 1996) was a former Austrian soldier and skier.

Hartmann served at the Garnisonssportvereinigung Innsbruck (garrison's sports union). He and his comrades Haslwanter, Schuler, Kleißl, Niederkofler and Hartmann were state champion in 1933, and won the championships of Tyrol in 1935 and 1937. In 1934, Hartmann was champion of Kärnten and East Tyrol. He was also a member of the national Olympic military patrol team, which finished fourth at the 1936 Winter Olympics.
