= Veikko Ruotsalainen =

Finnish skier (1908–1986)

Personal information
- Full name: Veikko Hannes Ruotsalainen
- Born: 12 May 1908
- Died: 5 March 1986 (aged 77)

Sport
- Sport: Skiing
Medal record
Representing Finland

Veikko Hannes Ruotsalainen (12 May 1908 – 5 March 1986) was a Finnish skier.

Ruotsalainen was a member of the national Olympic military patrol team in 1928 which placed second.
