= Ludwig Mayer (bookseller) =

Israeli bookseller

- Born: 1879; Prenzlau, Kingdom of Prussia, German Empire
- Died: 1978 (aged 98–99); Jerusalem, Israel
- Occupation: Merchant
- Years active: 1908–1978
- Known for: Opening the first modern bookstore in Palestine
- Notable work: Founder of the L. Mayer Bookstore in Jerusalem

Ludwig Mayer (1879 Prenzlau - 1978 Jerusalem) was an Israeli merchant who opened the first modern book store in Palestine.

Mayer was born in Germany to a family of Jewish wool merchants. After apprenticing as a bookseller, he moved to Ottoman Palestine in 1908 to open a book store in Jerusalem. He returned to Germany in 1914 to fight for "Kaiser und Vaterland". After the war he stayed in Berlin and opened book-mail-order company, supplying the Technion and the Hebrew University with books from Europe and America. Following the boycott of Jewish businesses in 1933, he returned to Jerusalem and re-opened his bookstore in what is now Koresh Street. Since 1935 it is situated in the "New Armenian Building" on Queen Shlomtsion Street (formerly Princess Mary Street). Mayer's clientele included Eliezer Ben-Yehuda and David Ben Gurion.

Mayer died in Jerusalem in 1978.
