= Ludwig Mayer (skier) =

German skier

- Born: 16 February 1902
- Died: 1 January 1945 (aged 42); Poznań, German-occupied Poland

Ludwig Mayer (16 February 1902 – 1 January 1945) was a German skier. He competed in the military patrol at the 1928 Summer Olympics. He was killed in action during World War II.
