= Eino Kuvaja =

Finnish Major and skier (1906–1975)

Eino Hjalmar Kuvaja
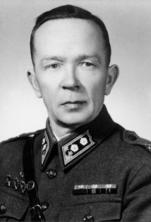
- Born: 17 June 1906; Kuopio, Finland
- Died: 11 December 1975 (aged 69)
- Military career
- Allegiance: Finland
- Branch: Finnish Army
- Rank: Major
- Awards: Mannerheim Cross (4 July 1944)

Eino Hjalmar Kuvaja (17 June 1906 – 11 December 1975) was a Finnish Major and skier.

Kuvaja was born in Kuopio. He was the leader of the national Olympic military patrol teams in 1928 and in 1936 which reached second places.
