= Daniele Pellissier =

Italian cross-country skier (1904–1972)

Daniele Pellissier (9 February 1904 – 8 November 1972) was an Italian cross-country skier.

Pellissier was born in the Aosta Valley. He finished 15th at the 1924 Winter Olympics in Chamonix at the competition of 18-km-cross-country skiing and took part as a soldier at the Italian military patrol team at the 1928 Winter Olympics in St. Moritz (demonstration). The team finished fourth. Also in 1928, he won the third place in the 35 kilometres event of the Italian men's championships of cross-country skiing.
