= Rowland Byers =

Rugby union player from Northern Ireland

- Full name: Rowland Morrow Byers
- Born: 18 June 1905 Belfast, Ireland
- Died: 26 September 2000 (aged 95) Birchwood

Rugby union career
- Position: Three-quarter
International career
Years	Team	Apps	(Points)
1928–29	Ireland	5	(0)

Rowland Morrow Byers (18 June 1905 — 26 September 2000) was an Irish international rugby union player.

Byers was the second-born son of academic and physician Professor Sir John Byers. He grew up in Belfast, attending Campbell College, then pursued further studies at the University of Oxford.

A three-quarter, Byers won Oxford blues as a centre in 1926, but his five Ireland caps came on the wing, across the 1928 and 1929 Five Nations Championships. He also played for Belfast club North of Ireland.

Byers was steward of the Turf Club in Dublin.

== See also ==
- List of Ireland national rugby union players
