= Kalle Tuppurainen =

Finnish skier (1904–1954)

Personal information
- Born: 28 November 1904
- Died: 1 January 1954 (aged 49)

Sport
- Sport: Skiing

Kalle Tuppurainen (28 November 1904 – 1 January 1954) was a Finnish skier.

He was member of the Finnish military patrol team (demonstration event) at the 1928 Winter Olympics which placed second.

At the Nordic World Ski Championships 1938 he finished 51st at the cross-country skiing competition.

== Cross-country skiing results ==
=== World Championships ===
Year	Age	18 km	50 km	4 × 10 km relay
1938	33	—	51	—
