= Józef Zubek =

Polish soldier and skier (1914–1988)

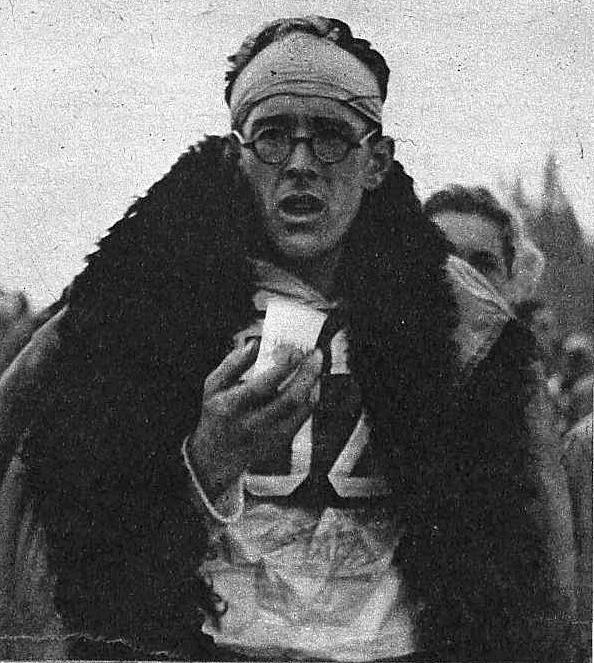
- Józef Zubek at WC in Zakopane (1939)

Personal information
- Born: March 4, 1914 Koscielisko, Congress Poland
- Died: November 6, 1988 (aged 74) Zakopane, Polish People's Republic

Sport
- Sport: Skiing
- Club: SN PTT-1907 Klub Sportowy Kemping Zakopane

Józef Zubek (March 4, 1914 – November 6, 1988) was a Polish soldier and skier.

Zubek was born in Kościelisko and was the son of a family of skiers. He was an alpine skier and ski jumper in the SN PTT-1907 Klub Sportowy Kemping Zakopane. He took part at the military patrol demonstration event of the 1936 Winter Olympics. The Polish team placed 8th. At the 1960 Winter Olympics he coached the cross-country skiing team and at the FIS Nordic World Ski Championships 1939. He also worked as a mountain guide for the Club Wysokogórskiego, later as a ski instructor, and cross-country coach of the SN and the KS Kolejarz PTT.

In 1969, he was awarded as Master of Sport, and became honorary member of the SN PTT Zakopane in 1980. He died in Zakopane.
