= Émilien Méresse =

French footballer and manager (1915–2000)

Personal information
- Full name: Émilien Paul Alfred Méresse
- Date of birth: 12 January 1915
- Place of birth: Beaumont-en-Cambrésis, France
- Date of death: 10 September 2000 (aged 85)
- Place of death: Cambrai, France
- Position: Midfielder

Senior career*
Years	Team	Apps	(Gls)
1933–1935	Star Club de Caudry		
1935–1939	SC Fives		
1944–1946	Lille OSC		

International career
1936	France	2	(0)

Managerial career
- 1950–?: Dunkerque
- ?–1968: Amiens
- * Club domestic league appearances and goals

Émilien Paul Alfred Méresse (12 January 1915 – 10 September 2000) was a French footballer who played as a midfielder for Lille OSC and the French national team in the 1930s and 1940s.

== Playing career ==
Born on 12 January 1915 in the Nord town in Beaumont-en-Cambrésis, Méresse began his football career at Star Club de Caudry in 1933, aged 18, from which he joined SC Fives in 1935, with whom he played for four years, until 1939, when the Second World War broke out. On 13 December 1936, the 21-year-old Méresse earned his first (and only) international cap in a 1–0 friendly win against Yugoslavia at Parc des Princes. The following day, the journalists of the French newspaper L'Auto (currently known as L'Équipe) stated that he had "made a few clumsy mistakes and was only average".

Méresse also played for the France B Military team in a friendly against Great Britain Military on 18 February 1940, which ended in a 1–2 loss. Once the War ended in 1945, he joined Lille OSC, being a member of the team that won the 1945–46 French Division 1.

== Managerial career ==
In 1950, Méresse took over Dunkerque, which marked the end of the club's troubled times. At some point in the 1960, he became the coach of Amiens, where he oversaw the likes of André Legrand and Robert Buchot. He held this position until 1968, when he was replaced by André Grillon.

== Death ==
Méresse died in Cambrai on 10 September 2000, at the age of 85.

== Honours ==
Lille OSC

- Ligue 1:
  - Champions (1): 1945–46
