= Léonce Bajart =

French sportsman and writer

- Born: 21 April 1888; Maubray, Belgium
- Died: 27 March 1983 (aged 94); Caudry, France
- Citizenship: French
- Occupations: Sportsman; Writer; Resistance fighter

Léonce Bajart (21 April 1888 – 27 March 1983) was a French sportsman, writer, resistance fighter, and one of the most notable citizens of Caudry.

== Notable citizen of Caudry ==
Léonce Bajart was born in Maubray, Belgium, on 21 April 1888, but moved to Caudry as a young boy, and in 1903, the 15-year-old Bajart founded the Star Club de Caudry, the first multi-sport society in the region. In the early 1920s, he promoted and presided over the organizing committee of the famous lace festivals of Caudry, which is known as the capital of French lace. For 45 years, from 1925 to 1970, he acted as a cantonal delegate, including 16 years as president of the cantonal delegates in the Arrondissement of Cambrai, and in a similar timespan, between 1929 and 1971, he was an administrator at the Caudry hospice, which later became a rural hospital.

Bajart was also noted for his humanitarian work; for instance, between 1932 and 1934, he served as the treasurer for a public fundraising effort aimed at supporting 2,000 unemployed residents of Caudry, and from 1936 to 1945, he held the position of vice-president, later becoming president, of the relief work for unfortunate children and the Milk Cup initiative, which provided nursery school children with milk, distributing a total of 25,480 liters during the Second World War.

== Resistance fighter ==
From the first days of the German Occupation, Bajart played an active role in the OMC Resistance Committee, where he worked alongside Lucien Janssoone, Victor Cordonnier, Marcel Drombry, and Auguste Lemaire. Within the OCM, led by Gaston Dassonville, he assisted in sheltering and transporting Allied airmen who had been shot down, organized fairs to support prisoners of war, gathered and transmitted military intelligence, and helped those who refused to comply with forced labor requirements.

== Writing career ==
In 1953, Bajart published a book called L'industrie des tulles et dentelles en France: son établissement dans le Cambrésis, l'essor de Caudry ("The tulle and lace industry in France: its establishment in Cambrésis, the rise of Caudry").

== Death and legacy ==
For all of his noble efforts throughout his life, Bajart was made a knight of the Legion of Honour in 1937, the highest French order of merit, and later he was awarded the Ordre des Palmes académiques in 1959.

Bajart died in Caudry on 27 March 1983, at the age of 94. Four years after his death, in 1987, his work Caudry was published posthumously by the Amis du Caudrésis.

== Work ==
L'industrie des tulles et dentelles en France : son établissement dans le Cambrésis, l'essor de Caudry (1953)
