= Peter Robinson (footballer, born 1922) =

English footballer

Personal information
- Full name: Peter Robinson
- Date of birth: 29 January 1922
- Place of birth: Manchester, England
- Date of death: 9 September 2000 (aged 78)
- Place of death: Manchester, England
- Position: Wing half

Youth career
- –1940: Urmston

Senior career*
| Years | Team | Apps | (Gls) |
| 1940–1947 | Manchester City | 1 | (0) |
| 1947–1949 | Chesterfield | 60 | (0) |
| 1949–1950 | Buxton | | |
| 1950–1955 | Notts County | 82 | (1) |
| 1955–1958 | King's Lynn | | |
| 1958–1960 | Macclesfield Town | | |

Managerial career
- 1958–1959: Macclesfield Town (player-manager)
- 1960–1961: Hyde United
- * Club domestic league appearances and goals

Peter Robinson (29 January 1922 – 9 September 2000) was an English professional footballer who played in the Football League for Notts County, Chesterfield and Manchester City as a wing half. After retiring from football, he managed Macclesfield Town and Hyde United in non-League football and later served in backroom roles at Manchester City and Preston North End.

== Career statistics ==
Appearances and goals by club, season and competition
| Club | Season | League | | | FA Cup | | Other | | Total | |
| Club | Season | Division | Apps | Goals | Apps | Goals | Apps | Goals | Apps | Goals |
|---|---|---|---|---|---|---|---|---|---|---|
| Manchester City | 1945–46 | ― | | | 1 | 0 | ― | | 1 | 0 |
| Manchester City | 1946–47 | Second Division | 1 | 0 | 0 | 0 | ― | | 1 | 0 |
| Manchester City | Total | | 1 | 0 | 1 | 0 | ― | | 2 | 0 |
| Chesterfield | 1947–48 | Second Division | 28 | 0 | 1 | 0 | ― | | 29 | 0 |
| Chesterfield | 1948–49 | Second Division | 32 | 0 | 1 | 0 | ― | | 33 | 0 |
| Chesterfield | Total | | 50 | 0 | 2 | 0 | ― | | 52 | 0 |
| Notts County | 1949–50 | Third Division South | 2 | 0 | 0 | 0 | ― | | 2 | 0 |
| Notts County | 1950–51 | Second Division | 38 | 0 | 0 | 0 | ― | | 38 | 0 |
| Notts County | 1951–52 | Second Division | 38 | 1 | 0 | 0 | ― | | 38 | 1 |
| Notts County | 1952–53 | Second Division | 4 | 0 | 0 | 0 | ― | | 4 | 0 |
| Notts County | Total | | 82 | 1 | 0 | 0 | ― | | 82 | 1 |
| Macclesfield Town | 1958–59 | Cheshire County League | 14 | 0 | 0 | 0 | 2 (Note: Appearances in Cheshire Challenge Cup) | 1 | 16 | 1 |
| Career total | | | 147 | 1 | 3 | 0 | 2 | 1 | 152 | 2 |
