= William E. Bradley Jr. =

American engineer and businessman

- Born: January 7, 1913; Lansdowne, Pennsylvania, US
- Died: September 19, 2000 (aged 87); New Hope, Pennsylvania, US
- Education: University of Pennsylvania
- Scientific career
- Fields: Electrical engineering
- Workplaces: Philco

William Earle Bradley Jr. (January 7, 1913 – September 19, 2000) was an American engineer and businessman who was the first president of the Society for Industrial and Applied Mathematics. He spent much of his career in research at Philco. He also spent 10 years doing government work and founded a water-purification business.

== Personal life ==
Bradley was born January 7, 1913, in Lansdowne, Pennsylvania. For 41 years he was married to Virginia Althea Meyer, also an employee of Philco. When he died on September 19, 2000, he was survived by two children. He was a member of Wrightstown Friends Meeting.

== Career ==
Bradley earned a degree in electrical engineering from the University of Pennsylvania in 1936, although the university counted him in the Class of 1935. He was a member of Tau Beta Pi and Sigma Xi. In June 1936 he joined Philco as a factory test engineer working on radio receivers. The next year he began working on wide-band amplifiers for television receivers, then in the experimental stage. During World War II he participated in Philco's collaboration with the Radiation Laboratory of the Massachusetts Institute of Technology, a collaboration that led to the invention of radar. He was promoted to assistant director of Philco's research division in 1945, director of the research division in 1946, and technical director in 1952. In addition to his research on television and radar, he also worked in physical optics, solid-state physics, and transistor manufacturing at Philco.

In 1957 Bradley went on leave from Philco and spent the next 10 years doing scientific work for the federal government. He began on President Dwight D. Eisenhower's Science Advisory Panel, chairing a subcommittee on missile defense as part of an arrangement with MIT Lincoln Laboratory. He later moved to the Institute for Defense Analyses. In 1970 Bradley moved to New Hope, Pennsylvania, where he founded Puredesal Corp., which researched energy-efficient water purification. The business failed, and Bradley became a consultant. He was involved in work on Marambio Base in Antarctica.

== Society for Industrial and Applied Mathematics ==
Bradley played a prominent role in the early life of the Society for Industrial and Applied Mathematics (SIAM). He delivered the lecture at the third meeting of SIAM in May 1952, the first since the organization was incorporated. In October of that year Bradley became the organization's first president at the urging of Ed Block, who worked under him at Philco and who spearheaded SIAM's creation. Bradley resigned shortly after, however, citing conflicts with his other activities. In May 1953 he was replaced by Donald B. Houghton.
