= Jaroslav Cháňa =

Czech footballer

Jaroslav Chana
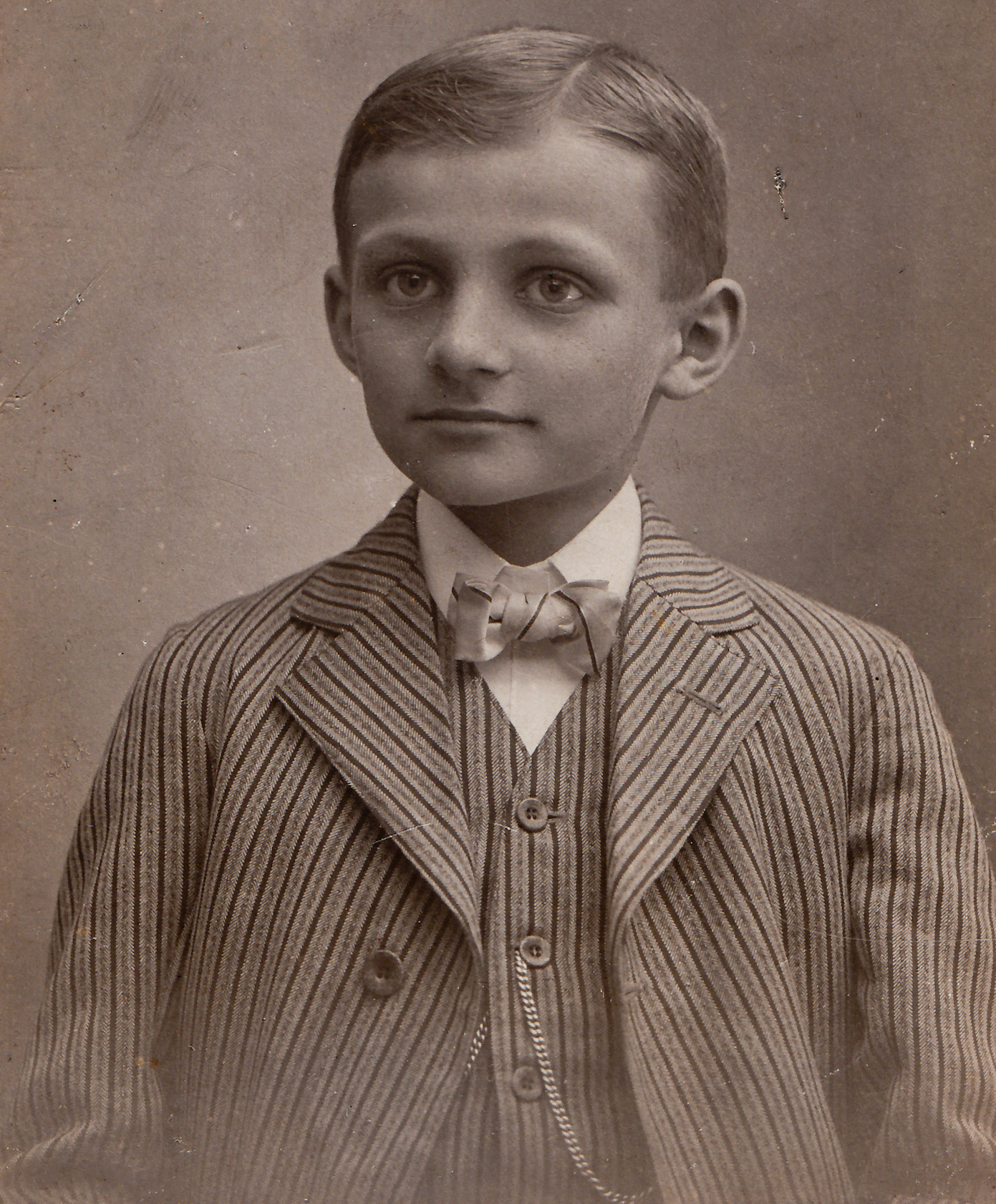

Personal information
- Date of birth: 19 December 1899
- Place of birth: Vršovice, Prague, Austria-Hungary
- Date of death: 26 September 2000 (aged 100)
- Position: Goalkeeper

Senior career*
Years	Team	Apps	(Gls)
1917–1923	SK Slavia Prague		

International career
1921	Czechoslovakia	2	(0)
- * Club domestic league appearances and goals

Jaroslav Chana (19 December 1899 – 26 September 2000) was a Czechoslovak football goalkeeper who played six seasons for SK Slavia Prague, earning nearly 200 caps with the team. He also had two international caps for the Czechoslovakia national football team in 1921. He was born in Vršovice, Prague. He later ran a car repair shop and, after the 1948 Czechoslovak coup d'état, worked with a state insurance company as a liquidator. He died in September 2000, at the age of 100.
