= Alf Burrell =

Australian rules footballer

Personal information
- Full name: Alfred Collins Burrell
- Born: 8 October 1922; Geelong West, Victoria
- Died: 29 September 2000 (aged 77); Torquay, Victoria
- Original team: West Geelong
- Height: 174 cm (5 ft 9 in)
- Weight: 83 kg (183 lb)

Playing career^{1}
Years	Club	Games (Goals)
1947–1948	Geelong	5 (0)
- ^{1} Playing statistics correct to the end of 1948.

Alfred Collins Burrell (8 October 1922 – 29 September 2000) was an Australian rules footballer who played for the Geelong Football Club in the Victorian Football League (VFL).

Prior playing with Geelong, Burrell served in the Royal Australian Air Force during World War II as a radio assistant stationed in the South West Pacific.
