= Eugen Tschurtschenthaler =

Austrian skier (1912–1974)

- Born: 21 November 1912
- Died: 2 January 1974 (aged 61); Kitzbühel, Austria

Eugen Tschurtschenthaler (21 November 1912 – 2 January 1974) was an Austrian skier. He competed in the military patrol at the 1936 Summer Olympics.
