= Johan Wiksten =

Swedish skier

Personal information
- Born: Johan Ragnar Wiksten; 26 February 1914 Piteå, Sweden
- Died: 22 September 2000 (aged 86) Piteå, Sweden

Sport
- Sport: Skiing

Johan Ragnar Wiksten (26 February 1914 – 22 September 2000) was a Swedish skier. He competed in the military patrol at the 1936 Summer Olympics.
