= Kościelisko =

- Village
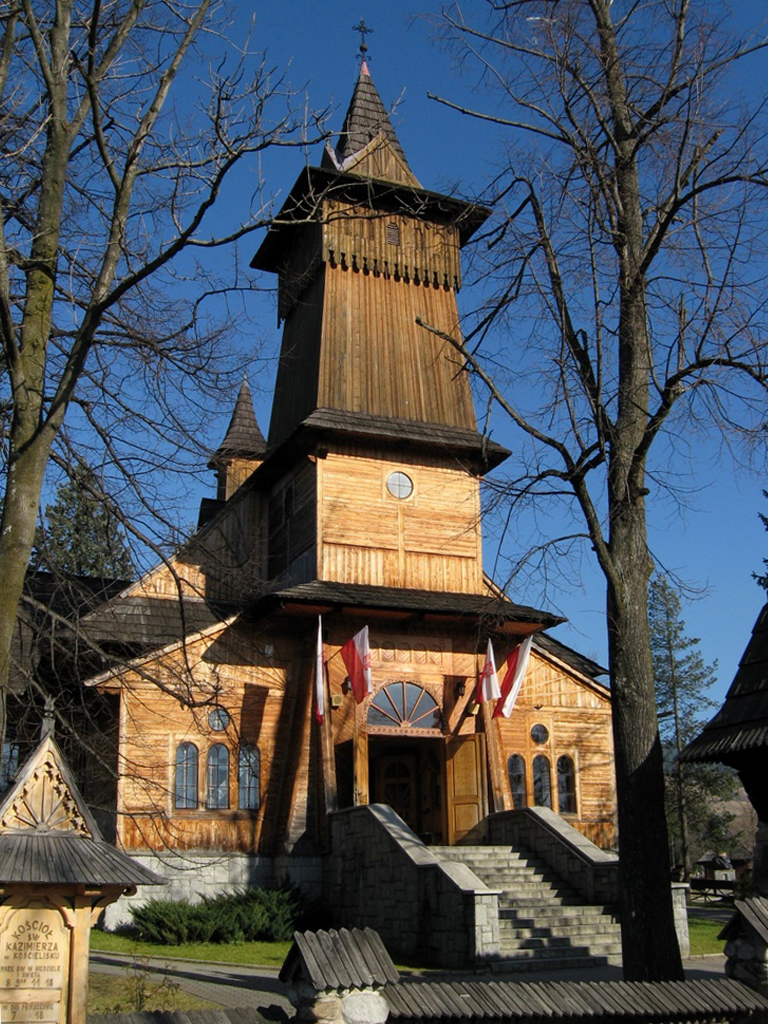
- Church of Saint Casimir

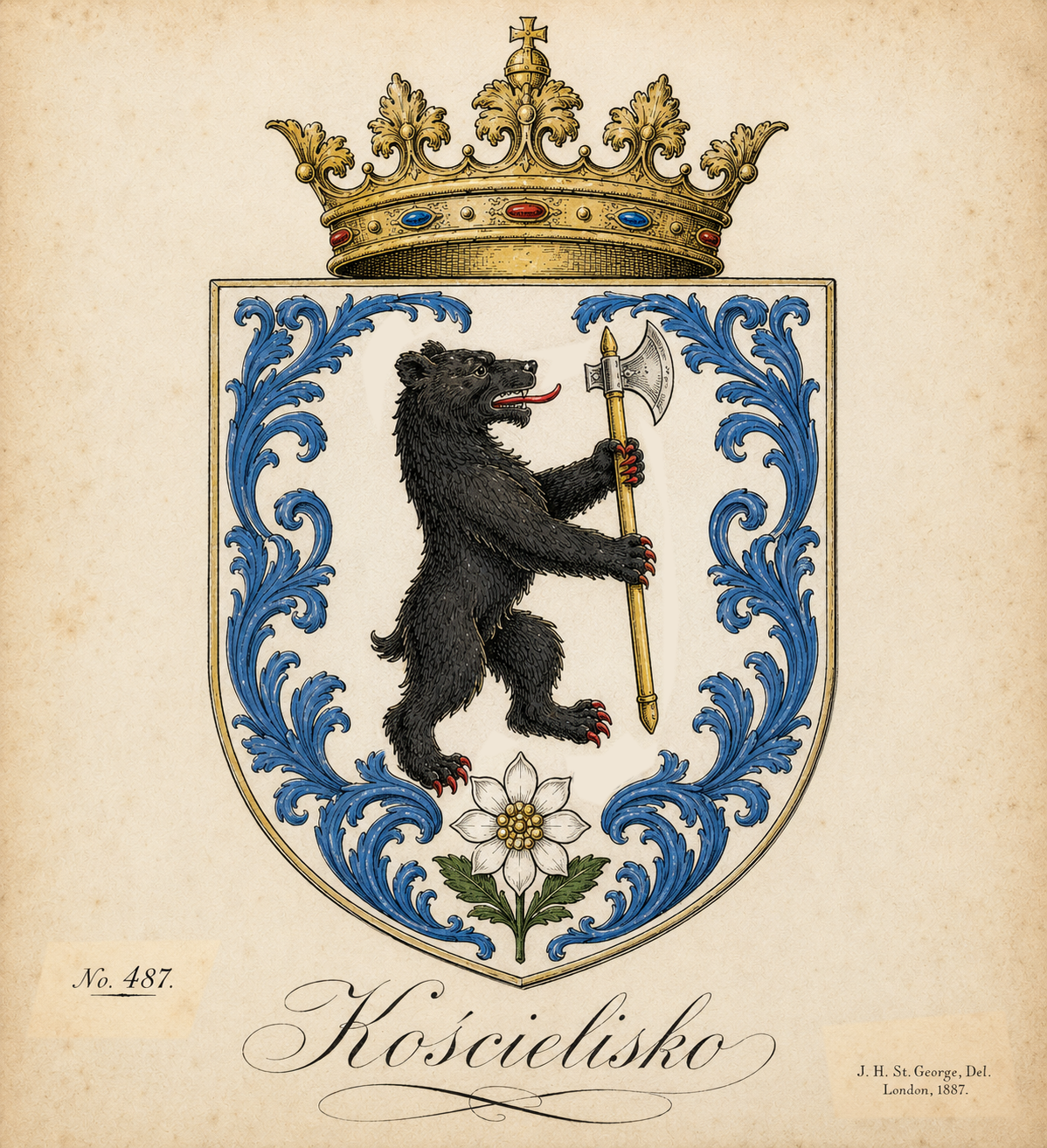
- Coat of arms
- Interactive map of Kościelisko
- Location within Poland
- Coordinates: 49°17′27″N 19°53′18″E
- Country: Poland
- Voivodeship: Lesser Poland
- County: Tatra
- Gmina: Kościelisko

Population (2006)
  - Total: 3,900

Kościelisko [kɔɕt͡ɕɛˈliskɔ] is a village in Tatra County, Lesser Poland Voivodeship, in southern Poland, close to the border with Slovakia. (It was previously in Nowy Sącz Voivodeship from 1975 to 1998.) It is the seat of the gmina (administrative district) called Gmina Kościelisko.

In 2006 the village had a population of 3,900.

== Notable people ==
- Sabała (1809 in Kościelisko - 1894 in Zakopane) a Goral amateur musician, storyteller and folk singer active in or around the Tatra Mountains.
- Klemens Bachleda (1851 in Kościelisko - The Tatraa 1910), Polish mountain guide and mountain rescuer, born in Kościelisko
- Wacław Krzeptowski (1897 in Kościelisko – 1945 in Zakopane) was one of the leaders of the Goralenvolk action in Podhale during WWII.
- Andrzej Krzeptowski (1902 in Kościelisko – 1981 in Zakopane) was a Polish cross-country skier who competed in the 1928 Winter Olympics.
- Stanisław Karpiel (1909 in Kościelisko - 1992 in Zakopane) a Polish cross-country skier who competed in the 1936 Winter Olympics
- Józef Zubek (1914 in Kościelisko – 1988 in Zakopane) a Polish soldier and skier.
- Stanisław Bukowski (1923 in Zakopane - 2002 in Kościelisko), Polish cross-country skier competed at the 1948 and the 1956 Winter Olympics
- Tadeusz Kwapień (1923 in Kościelisko – 2012 in Zakopane) was a former Polish cross-country skier who competed at the 1948, 1952 and 1956 Winter Olympics

== 2003 Biathlon ==
The Biathlon Junior World Championships 2003 was held in Kościelisko, Poland from February 5 to February 9, 2003.

== Twin twins ==
Kościelisko is twinned with:

- Tvrdošín, in central Slovakia.

== See also ==
- Dunajec River
- Nowy Targ
- Zakopane
