= Ralph Corsel =

American novelist

- Born: Raffaelo Corsalini
- Died: September 17, 2000
- Education: Columbia University
- Occupations: Salesman, writer
- Writing career
- Language: English
- Years active: 1968–1993
- Period: Modernism
- Notable work: Up There The Stars (1968)

Ralph Corsel (died 2000) was an Italian-American novelist whose work dramatized the experience of Italian immigrants in New York City.

== Biography ==
Ralph "Corseli" Corsel was born Raffaelo Corsalini to Neapolitan immigrants in Morris Avenue's Little Italy section of the South Bronx.

Corsel had a troubled childhood, coming of age during the Great Depression. By the age of nine he had become a petty thief, and was sent to juvenile reformatory as a teenager. He went on to become "a gun moll's boyfriend who worked in a bootlegging plant, and a Depression-era hobo and panhandler who trekked cross-country to California, where he tried to become a professional singer and became instead a pickpocket and confidence man." He served in the Army during World War II, and worked as a bartender before establishing his own business as a manufacturer's agent.

After a decade of owning his own business, he was able to step back from the day-to-day operations and pursue his dream of writing. Corsel's formal education had ended in the eight grade, and yet he enrolled in writing courses at Columbia University's School of General Studies. A teacher there encouraged him to turn his stories into a novel, which became his debut Up There the Stars (1968) published by The Citadel Press. The novel details Corsel's "colorful youth" and has been described as a classic "hardboiled novel of Great Depression-era life in the Bronx." Alberto Traldi, in a review of Italian-American fiction, describes Up There The Stars as "a touching novel with a refreshing hint of self-rehabilitation and with accurate information about crime and its psychological, social conditioning."

Following the publication of his debut, Corsel went on from to write columns for Italian-American publications including the Italo-American Times and The Challenge.

He teamed up with the famous boxer Rocky Graziano to write Somebody Down Here Likes Me, Too, based on the boxer's turbulent and violent life story. The book's title is after Graziano's 1955 autobiography, Somebody Up There Likes Me, which was the basis of the 1956 Oscar-winning drama film of the same name.

At its publication, The New York Times wrote:

To compose the biography - which recapitulates the fighter's troubled youth, including reformatory and prison terms, and takes him through his championship and beyond, into the realm of show business and marriage and celebrity friends and the counselling of delinquent youngsters and jail inmates - Mr. Corsel followed Mr. Graziano around with a tape recorder, interviewed his friends and conducted research in files of old newspapers.

Corsel was twice married.

Corsel died on September 17, 2000. He was survived by his daughter Candy and his grandchildren Elise and Paul.

== Published works ==
- Up There The Stars (1968)
- Somebody Down Here Likes Me, Too, with Rocky Graziano (1982)
- The Con Man: A Novel of the Game of Confidence(1993)
