= Jean Pierre Pellissier =

French missionary (1808–1867)

- Born: 28 September 1808; St. Arey, France
- Died: 11 June 1867 (aged 58); Bethulie, Orange Free State

Jean Pierre Pellissier (28 September 1808 in St. Arey, France – 11 June 1867 in Bethulie, Orange Free State) was a missionary from the Paris Evangelical Missionary Society to Southern Africa.

== Career ==
Pellissier arrived in Cape Town, South Africa on 5 September 1831, where he stayed at Wamakersvallei (Wellington, South Africa) for two months, to learn Dutch.

Perllissier departed from Wamakersvallei to Kuruman, South Africa to do mission work among the Tswana people (Zeerust). Local infighting between rival tribes caused him to move to the area north of the Orange River in 1833, to a site where the London Missionary Society had an unsuccessful attempt to start a mission station among the Khoi people. He later named the mission station Bethulie (meaning Eloah – house of God). The land of the mission station was transferred to the Paris Mission Society in 1836. Besides his mission work, Pellissier made a great contribution towards practical education and medicine among the local people. This resulted in one of the best-developed mission stations in southern Africa beyond the Orange River for that period.

== Family life ==
Pellissier married Martha Thorpe Murray (b.23 February 1814, d.17 October 1887) a 1820 Settlers child. He had six daughters and 1 son: Henriette (b.1835), Amelie (b.1838), Louise (b. 1841), Marie (b.1843), Charlotte Caroline Klynveld (b.1846), Emilie (b.1848), Samuel Henri (b.1850).

Notably, their daughter Charlotte, married Herman Klynveld, a Dutch-born legal professional who would become a member of the Volksraad and notable political figure in the Orange Free State. This links the Pellissier family to significant political events and figures in South African history.

== Acknowledgement ==
In 1861 he was officially acknowledged as a medical practitioner by the local government of the Orange Free State.
