= Jean Pellissier (shepherd) =

14th-century French shepherd

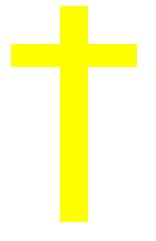
A Cathar Cross

Jean Pellissier was a 14th-century shepherd in the Comté de Foix, made notable by appearing in Emmanuel Le Roy Ladurie's Montaillou. Pellissier was born in Montaillou to a family of poor peasants. One of a number of sons, he became a shepherd as the family land would not sustain all of them. At the age of twelve, as was the custom, he began tending his family's flock of sheep. Soon he was apprenticed in Tournon to a woman named Thomassia, likely a widow. He worked there for five or six years before returning home and living with his widowed mother and his four brothers, Raymond, Guillaume, Bernard, and Pierre.

Some years later he again left home to become a shepherd in Niort. Staying there two years, he went to Mompret for a year before again returning to Montaillou. He then moved in with Bernard and Guillemette Maurs and worked tending their flock, the couple's children being too young for the job. His brother Bernard also resided there working as a ploughboy for the couple. The Maurs were Cathars and Jean was briefly converted to the movement.

In 1308, however, the town of Montaillou was raided by the local inquisition and the Maurs arrested. Pellissier left for the neighbouring town of Prades d'Aillon where he was hired by Bernard Malet; two months later Malet was also imprisoned by the inquisition. Pellissier remained in the employ of Malet's sons Bernard, Raymond, and André.

Eventually Pellissier left to resume travelling through the region for several years before accumulating enough money to settle in Montaillou with his own flock.
