= Ron Dixon (businessman) =

Canadian businessman

Ron Dixon (died 15 September 2000) was a Canadian businessman who was the majority owner of Dundee.

== Career ==
In 1992, Dixon became the owner of Scottish side Dundee.
