= List of Olympic medalists in curling =

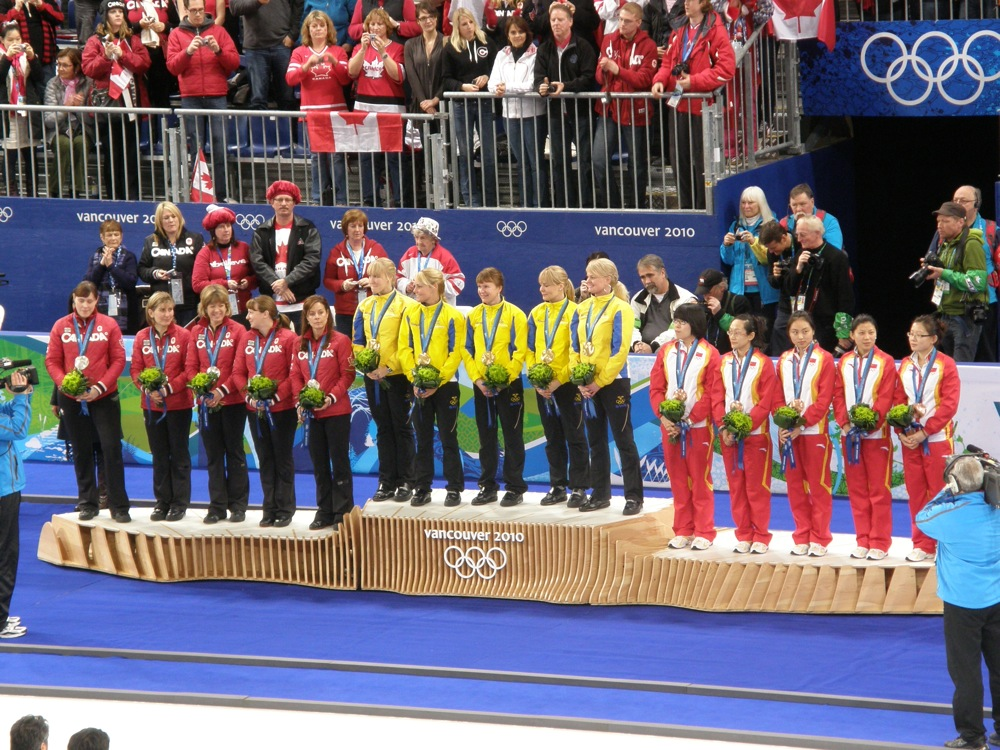
The medalists in the women's tournament at the 2010 Winter Olympics. Left to right: Canada (silver), Sweden (gold) and China (bronze).

Curling is a team sport that is contested at the Winter Olympic Games. A men's tournament was held at the 1924 Winter Olympics before the sport was removed from the official programme until the 1998 Games. For 82 years, the 1924 tournament was considered a demonstration sport, so the medals were not officially counted by the International Olympic Committee (IOC). The tournament was won by a team from the Royal Caledonian Curling Club in Scotland, who represented Great Britain. In 2006, Scottish newspaper The Herald conducted an investigation that found evidence that curling had been part of the official programme. The IOC subsequently recognized the top three teams as full medal winners.

Although not part of the official programme, curling was contested as a demonstration sport in 1932, 1988 and 1992. Curling was re-added as a demonstration event in 1988 because the Olympics were being held in Calgary, Alberta, Canada, where the sport has a strong following. In November 1992, the Nagano Winter Olympic Organizing Committee and IOC Coordination Committee reached an agreement to include curling in the official programme of the 1998 Games in Nagano, Japan. Both the men's and women's tournaments have been held at every Winter Olympics since.

In total, 224 athletes have won a medal in curling, and 2 have won four. In 2010, Anette Norberg, Eva Lund, Cathrine Lindahl and Anna Le Moine of Sweden won the gold medal in the women's tournament, becoming the first curlers to win consecutive gold medals. Norberg also won a silver in 1988 when curling was a demonstration sport. Agnes Knochenhauer (two gold, one silver, one bronze) and Oskar Eriksson of Sweden (one gold, one silver, two bronze) have won four medals. According to the IOC, Carl August Kronlund of Sweden was the oldest Winter Olympics medallist, winning silver in 1924 at the age of 59. Robin Welsh of Great Britain was the oldest Winter Olympics gold medallist, winning in 1924 when he was 54. Silvana Tirinzoni of Switzerland was the oldest woman medalist at the Winter Olympics, winning the silver medal in 2026 when she was 46.

Teams from Canada have been successful in the sport since its return to the programme, winning at least a medal at each Olympics for a total of seven gold, three silver and four bronze. Teams from Great Britain, Switzerland, Norway, Sweden, United States and Italy have also won gold medals in the sport. A total of 60 medals (20 of each color) have been awarded since 1924 and have been won by teams from 13 National Olympic Committees (NOC).

== Medalists ==
=== Men ===
Games	Gold	Silver	Bronze
1924 Chamonix	Great Britain^{1} William Jackson; Robin Welsh; Thomas Murray; Laurence Jackson; D. G. Astley	Sweden; Johan Petter Åhlén; Carl August Kronlund; Ture Ödlund; Carl Wilhelm Petersén; Carl Axel Pettersson; Erik Severin; Karl Wahlberg; Victor Wetterström	France; Henri Cournollet; Georges André; Armand Bénédic; Pierre Canivet; Robert Planque; Henri Aldebert
1928–1994	not included in the Olympic programme		
1998 Nagano	Switzerland; Patrick Hürlimann; Patrik Lörtscher; Daniel Müller; Diego Perren; Dominic Andres	Canada; Mike Harris; Richard Hart; Collin Mitchell; George Karrys; Paul Savage	Norway; Eigil Ramsfjell; Jan Thoresen; Stig-Arne Gunnestad; Tore Torvbråten; Anthon Grimsmo
2002 Salt Lake City	Norway; Pål Trulsen; Lars Vågberg; Flemming Davanger; Bent Ånund Ramsfjell; Torger Nergård	Canada; Kevin Martin; Don Walchuk; Carter Rycroft; Don Bartlett; Ken Tralnberg	Switzerland; Andreas Schwaller; Christof Schwaller; Markus Eggler; Damian Grichting; Marco Ramstein
2006 Turin	Canada; Brad Gushue; Mark Nichols; Russ Howard; Jamie Korab; Mike Adam	Finland; Markku Uusipaavalniemi; Wille Mäkelä; Kalle Kiiskinen; Teemu Salo; Jani Sullanmaa	United States; Pete Fenson; Shawn Rojeski; Joe Polo; John Shuster; Scott Baird
2010 Vancouver	Canada; Kevin Martin; John Morris; Marc Kennedy; Ben Hebert; Adam Enright	Norway; Thomas Ulsrud; Torger Nergård; Christoffer Svae; Håvard Vad Petersson; Thomas Løvold	Switzerland; Ralph Stöckli; Jan Hauser; Markus Eggler; Simon Strübin; Toni Müller
2014 Sochi	Canada; Brad Jacobs; Ryan Fry; E. J. Harnden; Ryan Harnden; Caleb Flaxey	Great Britain; David Murdoch; Greg Drummond; Scott Andrews; Michael Goodfellow; Tom Brewster	Sweden; Niklas Edin; Sebastian Kraupp; Fredrik Lindberg; Viktor Kjäll; Oskar Eriksson
2018 Pyeongchang	United States; John Shuster; Tyler George; Matt Hamilton; John Landsteiner; Joe Polo	Sweden; Niklas Edin; Oskar Eriksson; Rasmus Wranå; Christoffer Sundgren; Henrik Leek	Switzerland; Benoît Schwarz; Claudio Pätz; Peter de Cruz; Valentin Tanner; Dominik Märki
2022 Beijing	Sweden; Niklas Edin; Oskar Eriksson; Rasmus Wranå; Christoffer Sundgren; Daniel Magnusson	Great Britain; Bruce Mouat; Grant Hardie; Bobby Lammie; Hammy McMillan Jr. Ross Whyte	Canada; Brad Gushue; Mark Nichols; Brett Gallant; Geoff Walker; Marc Kennedy
2026 Milano Cortina	Canada; Brad Jacobs; Marc Kennedy; Brett Gallant; Ben Hebert; Tyler Tardi	Great Britain; Bruce Mouat; Grant Hardie; Bobby Lammie; Hammy McMillan Jr. Kyle Waddell	Switzerland; Benoît Schwarz-van Berkel; Yannick Schwaller; Sven Michel; Pablo Lachat-Couchepin; Kim Schwaller

- Medals:

Rank	Nation	Gold	Silver	Bronze	Total
1	Canada	4	2	1	7
2	Sweden	1	2	1	4
3	Great Britain	1	3	0	4
3	Norway	1	1	1	3
5	Switzerland	1	0	4	5
6	United States	1	0	1	2
7	Finland	0	1	0	1
8	France	0	0	1	1
Total		9	9	9	27

=== Women ===
Games	Gold	Silver	Bronze
1998 Nagano	Canada; Sandra Schmirler; Jan Betker; Joan McCusker; Marcia Gudereit; Atina Ford	Denmark; Helena Blach Lavrsen; Margit Pörtner; Dorthe Holm; Trine Qvist; Jane Bidstrup	Sweden; Elisabet Gustafson; Katarina Nyberg; Louise Marmont; Elisabeth Persson; Margaretha Lindahl
2002 Salt Lake City	Great Britain; Rhona Martin; Deborah Knox; Fiona MacDonald; Janice Rankin; Margaret Morton	Switzerland; Luzia Ebnöther; Mirjam Ott; Tanya Frei; Laurence Bidaud; Nadia Röthlisberger	Canada; Kelley Law; Julie Skinner; Georgina Wheatcroft; Diane Nelson; Cheryl Noble
2006 Turin	Sweden; Anette Norberg; Eva Lund; Cathrine Lindahl; Anna Svärd; Ulrika Bergman	Switzerland; Mirjam Ott; Binia Beeli; Valeria Spälty; Michèle Moser; Manuela Kormann	Canada; Shannon Kleibrink; Amy Nixon; Glenys Bakker; Christine Keshen; Sandra Jenkins
2010 Vancouver	Sweden; Anette Norberg; Eva Lund; Cathrine Lindahl; Anna Le Moine; Kajsa Bergström	Canada; Cheryl Bernard; Susan O'Connor; Carolyn Darbyshire; Cori Bartel; Kristie Moore	China; Wang Bingyu; Liu Yin; Yue Qingshuang; Zhou Yan; Liu Jinli
2014 Sochi	Canada; Jennifer Jones; Kaitlyn Lawes; Jill Officer; Dawn McEwen; Kirsten Wall	Sweden; Maria Prytz; Christina Bertrup; Maria Wennerström; Margaretha Sigfridsson; Agnes Knochenhauer	Great Britain; Eve Muirhead; Anna Sloan; Vicki Adams; Claire Hamilton; Lauren Gray
2018 Pyeongchang	Sweden; Anna Hasselborg; Sara McManus; Agnes Knochenhauer; Sofia Mabergs; Jennie Wåhlin	South Korea; Kim Eun-jung; Kim Kyeong-ae; Kim Seon-yeong; Kim Yeong-mi; Kim Cho-hi	Japan; Satsuki Fujisawa; Chinami Yoshida; Yumi Suzuki; Yurika Yoshida; Mari Motohashi
2022 Beijing	Great Britain; Eve Muirhead; Vicky Wright; Jennifer Dodds; Hailey Duff; Mili Smith	Japan; Satsuki Fujisawa; Chinami Yoshida; Yumi Suzuki; Yurika Yoshida; Kotomi Ishizaki	Sweden; Anna Hasselborg; Sara McManus; Agnes Knochenhauer; Sofia Mabergs; Johanna Heldin
2026 Milano Cortina	Sweden; Anna Hasselborg; Sara McManus; Agnes Knochenhauer; Sofia Scharback; Johanna Heldin	Switzerland; Alina Pätz; Silvana Tirinzoni; Carole Howald; Selina Witschonke; Stefanie Berset	Canada; Rachel Homan; Tracy Fleury; Emma Miskew; Sarah Wilkes; Rachelle Brown

- Medals:

Rank	Nation	Gold	Silver	Bronze	Total
1	Sweden	4	1	2	7
2	Canada	2	1	3	6
3	Great Britain	2	0	1	3
4	Switzerland	0	3	0	3
5	Japan	0	1	1	2
6	Denmark	0	1	0	1
6	South Korea	0	1	0	1
8	China	0	0	1	1
Total		8	8	8	24

=== Mixed doubles ===
Games	Gold	Silver	Bronze
2018 Pyeongchang	Canada; Kaitlyn Lawes; John Morris	Switzerland; Jenny Perret; Martin Rios	Norway; Kristin Skaslien; Magnus Nedregotten
2022 Beijing	Italy; Stefania Constantini; Amos Mosaner	Norway; Kristin Skaslien; Magnus Nedregotten	Sweden; Almida de Val; Oskar Eriksson
2026 Milano Cortina	Sweden; Isabella Wranå; Rasmus Wranå	United States; Cory Thiesse; Korey Dropkin	Italy; Stefania Constantini; Amos Mosaner

- Medals:

Rank	Nation	Gold	Silver	Bronze	Total
1	Italy	1	0	1	2
1	Sweden	1	0	1	2
3	Canada	1	0	0	1
4	Norway	0	1	1	2
5	Switzerland	0	1	0	1
5	United States	0	1	0	1
Total		3	3	3	9

=== Notes ===
1. The members of the 1924 British team vary depending on the source. William Jackson, Robin Welsh, Thomas Murray and Laurence Jackson are listed as the medallists by the British Olympic Association and International Society of Olympic Historians. The Herald reports that those four are the only British curlers that played, and they received gold medals and certificates. However, the IOC database omits Laurence Jackson and includes T. Aikman, D. G. Astley, W. Brown, R. Cousin and J. McLeod. According to The Herald, the IOC believes that those five also received medals. The World Curling Federation's list agrees with the BOA, but also lists John T. Robertson Aikman [incorrectly] as an alternate.

== Athlete medal leaders ==
Athlete	Nation	Olympics	Gold	Silver	Bronze	Total
Agnes Knochenhauer	Sweden	2014, 2018, 2022, 2026	2	1	1	4
Rasmus Wranå	Sweden	2018, 2022, 2026	2	1	0	3
Anna Hasselborg	Sweden	2018, 2022, 2026	2	0	1	3
Sara McManus	Sweden	2018, 2022, 2026	2	0	1	3
Sofia Scharback	Sweden	2018, 2022, 2026	2	0	1	3
Marc Kennedy	Canada	2010, 2022, 2026	2	0	1	3
Brad Jacobs	Canada	2014, 2026	2	0	0	2
Ben Hebert	Canada	2010, 2026	2	0	0	2
Kaitlyn Lawes	Canada	2014, 2018	2	0	0	2
John Morris	Canada	2010, 2018	2	0	0	2
Anette Norberg	Sweden	2006, 2010	2	0	0	2
Eva Lund	Sweden	2006, 2010	2	0	0	2
Cathrine Lindahl	Sweden	2006, 2010	2	0	0	2
Anna Le Moine	Sweden	2006, 2010	2	0	0	2
Oskar Eriksson	Sweden	2014, 2018, 2022	1	1	2	4
Niklas Edin	Sweden	2014, 2018, 2022	1	1	1	3
Christoffer Sundgren	Sweden	2018, 2022	1	1	0	2
Kevin Martin	Canada	2002, 2010	1	1	0	2
Torger Nergård	Norway	2002, 2010	1	1	0	2
Stefania Constantini	Italy	2022, 2026	1	0	1	2
Amos Mosaner	Italy	2022, 2026	1	0	1	2
Johanna Heldin	Sweden	2022, 2026	1	0	1	2
Brett Gallant	Canada	2022, 2026	1	0	1	2
Eve Muirhead	Great Britain	2014, 2022	1	0	1	2
Brad Gushue	Canada	2006, 2022	1	0	1	2
Mark Nichols	Canada	2006, 2022	1	0	1	2
John Shuster	United States	2006, 2018	1	0	1	2
Joe Polo	United States	2006, 2018	1	0	1	2
Bruce Mouat	Great Britain	2022, 2026	0	2	0	2
Grant Hardie	Great Britain	2022, 2026	0	2	0	2
Bobby Lammie	Great Britain	2022, 2026	0	2	0	2
Hammy McMillan Jr.	Great Britain	2022, 2026	0	2	0	2
Mirjam Ott	Switzerland	2002, 2006	0	2	0	2
Kristin Skaslien	Norway	2018, 2022	0	1	1	2
Magnus Nedregotten	Norway	2018, 2022	0	1	1	2
Satsuki Fujisawa	Japan	2018, 2022	0	1	1	2
Chinami Yoshida	Japan	2018, 2022	0	1	1	2
Yumi Suzuki	Japan	2018, 2022	0	1	1	2
Yurika Yoshida	Japan	2018, 2022	0	1	1	2
Benoît Schwarz-van Berkel	Switzerland	2018, 2026	0	0	2	2
Markus Eggler	Switzerland	2002, 2010	0	0	2	2

== See also ==
- List of Paralympic medalists in wheelchair curling
- List of World Men's Curling Champions
- List of World Women's Curling Champions
- World Mixed Doubles Curling Championship
