= List of first Olympic medalists by National Olympic Committee =

An Olympic medal is awarded to successful competitors at one of the Olympic Games. There are three classes of medal to be won: gold, silver, and bronze, awarded to first, second, and third place, respectively. Athletes competing at the Olympics do so representing National Olympic Committees (NOCs) and cannot enter the Olympic Games as individual competitors or without the authority of an NOC. NOCs must be recognized by the International Olympic Committee, the sole authority capable of doing so, in order to compete. Following the 2023 suspension of the Russian Olympic Committee and Belarus Olympic Committee, (Note: The Russian Olympic Committee (ROC) was suspended due to breach of the Olympic Charter. The ROC claimed authority over regional sports organizations which fall under the IOC recognized purview of the National Olympic Committee of Ukraine, violating the territorial integrity of Ukraine's NOC.) an exception to this general rule was made which allowed select athletes to compete at the 2024 Summer Games as part of the Individual Neutral Athletes team. (Note: The delegation was banned from using the Olympic flag and Olympic anthem, which was the usual custom for neutral designated athletes in previous games. They instead used a teal flag depicting a circular AIN emblem and a one-off instrumental anthem, both assigned by the IOC. Individual neutral athletes had to be first background checked and then approved by each sport's international federation, and then by a special panel created by the IOC. Due to the AIN participating as a neutral team under certain conditions, the delegation did not march the parade of nations during the opening ceremony and did not receive an official ranking in the medal tables. Medals won under this designation were not added to the countries' overall totals.)

In some cases, a NOC may garner multiple medals in the same edition where it won its first ever Olympic medal. Scheduling of events is a factor that plays a part in who is considered the first Olympic medalist for a NOC.

Scope: This article considers only medals awarded in sports competitions; medals from the art competitions are therefore excluded. (Note: If the medals awarded in the art competitions are included, the list below would change only for two countries: Monaco and Ireland at the 1924 Summer Olympics. At those Games, Julien Médecin won the only medal in Monaco's Olympic history, a bronze medal in the architecture competition. At those same games, Jack B. Yeats has won a silver medal in the painting competition for Ireland, four years before his compatriot Pat O'Callaghan won Ireland's first medal in a sports competition, in the men's hammer throw at the 1928 Summer Olympics.)

== Summer Olympics ==
Key
| ^{*} | Entities that no longer exist |

First medalists by NOC at the Summer Olympic Games
| Edition | NOC | Medal | Medalist(s) | Sport | Event | Refs |
|---|---|---|---|---|---|---|
| 1896 Athens | Australia | Gold | Edwin Flack | Athletics | Men's 1500 metres | |
| 1896 Athens | Austria | Silver | Otto Herschmann | Swimming | Men's 100 metre freestyle | |
| 1896 Athens | Denmark | Gold | Viggo Jensen | Weightlifting | Men's two hand lift | |
| 1896 Athens | France | Silver | Alexandre Tuffèri | Athletics | Men's triple jump | |
| 1896 Athens | Germany | Gold | Conrad Böcker | Gymnastics | Men's team parallel bars | |
| 1896 Athens | Germany | Gold | Alfred Flatow | Gymnastics | Men's team parallel bars | |
| 1896 Athens | Germany | Gold | Gustav Flatow | Gymnastics | Men's team parallel bars | |
| 1896 Athens | Germany | Gold | Georg Hillmar | Gymnastics | Men's team parallel bars | |
| 1896 Athens | Germany | Gold | Fritz Manteuffel | Gymnastics | Men's team parallel bars | |
| 1896 Athens | Germany | Gold | Karl Neukirch | Gymnastics | Men's team parallel bars | |
| 1896 Athens | Germany | Gold | Richard Röstel | Gymnastics | Men's team parallel bars | |
| 1896 Athens | Germany | Gold | Gustav Schuft | Gymnastics | Men's team parallel bars | |
| 1896 Athens | Germany | Gold | Carl Schuhmann | Gymnastics | Men's team parallel bars | |
| 1896 Athens | Germany | Gold | Hermann Weingärtner | Gymnastics | Men's team parallel bars | |
| 1896 Athens | Great Britain | Gold | Launceston Elliot | Weightlifting | Men's one hand lift | |
| 1896 Athens | Greece | Bronze | Ioannis Persakis | Athletics | Men's triple jump | |
| 1896 Athens | Hungary | Silver | Nándor Dáni | Athletics | Men's 800 metres | |
| 1896 Athens | Switzerland | Silver | Louis Zutter | Gymnastics | Men's vault | |
| 1896 Athens | United States | Gold | James Connolly | Athletics | Men's triple jump | |
| 1896 Athens | Mixed team * | | | | | |
| 1900 Paris | Belgium | Gold | Aimé Haegeman | Equestrian | Individual jumping | |
| 1900 Paris | Bohemia * | Bronze | Hedwig Rosenbaum | Tennis | Women's singles (Note: Hedwig Rosenbaum won bronze in both the women's tennis singles and tennis mixed doubles events. However, medals awarded to mixed teams were not split between NOCs, but were instead attributed to a mixed team. As such, the women's tennis singles event is credited as Bohemia's first Olympic medal.) | |
| 1900 Paris | Cuba | Gold | Ramón Fonst | Fencing | Men's épée | |
| 1900 Paris | India | Silver | Norman Pritchard | Athletics | Men's 200 metres hurdles | |
| 1900 Paris | Italy | Gold | Gian Giorgio Trissino | Equestrian | High jump | |
| 1900 Paris | Netherlands | Silver | Chris Hooijkaas | Sailing | 3 to 10 ton | |
| 1900 Paris | Netherlands | Silver | Henri Smulders | Sailing | 3 to 10 ton | |
| 1900 Paris | Netherlands | Silver | Arie van der Velden | Sailing | 3 to 10 ton | |
| 1900 Paris | Norway | Bronze | Carl Albert Andersen | Athletics | Men's pole vault | |
| 1900 Paris | Spain | Gold | José Aspizúa | Basque pelota | Cesta punta | |
| 1900 Paris | Spain | Gold | Francisco Villota | Basque pelota | Cesta punta | |
| 1900 Paris | Sweden | Bronze | Ernst Fast | Athletics | Men's marathon | |
| 1904 St. Louis | Canada | Gold | Winnipeg Shamrocks | Lacrosse | | (Note: Canadian George Orton won two medals at the 1900 Summer Olympics, but did not do so as part of the national team as Canada did not send a delegation.) |
| 1908 London | Australasia (Note: Australia and New Zealand competed as a united team called Australasia for the 1908 and 1912 Summer Games.) * | Bronze | Harry Kerr | Athletics | Men's 3500 metres walk | |
| 1908 London | Finland | Bronze | Finland men's national gymnastics team | Gymnastics | Men's team | |
| 1908 London | Russian Empire* | Silver | Aleksandr Petrov | Wrestling | Men's Greco-Roman heavyweight | |
| 1908 London | South Africa | Gold | Reggie Walker | Athletics | Men's 100 metres | |
| 1920 Antwerp | Brazil | Silver | Afrânio da Costa | Shooting | Men's 50 metre pistol | |
| 1920 Antwerp | Czechoslovakia * | Bronze | Czechoslovakia men's national ice hockey team | Ice hockey | Men's tournament | |
| 1920 Antwerp | Estonia | Silver | Jüri Lossmann | Athletics | Men's marathon | |
| 1920 Antwerp | Japan | Silver | Ichiya Kumagae | Tennis | Men's singles | |
| 1920 Antwerp | Luxembourg | Silver | Joseph Alzin | Weightlifting | Men's +82.5 kg | (Note: An athlete from Luxembourg competed as a member of the French team, though his nationality is disputed.) |
| 1920 Antwerp | New Zealand | Bronze | Darcy Hadfield | Rowing | Men's single sculls | |
| 1924 Paris | Argentina | Silver | Luis Brunetto | Athletics | Men's triple jump | |
| 1924 Paris | Haiti | Bronze | Ludovic Augustin | Shooting | Men's team free rifle | |
| 1924 Paris | Haiti | Bronze | Destin Destine | Shooting | Men's team free rifle | |
| 1924 Paris | Haiti | Bronze | Eloi Metullus | Shooting | Men's team free rifle | |
| 1924 Paris | Haiti | Bronze | Astrel Rolland | Shooting | Men's team free rifle | |
| 1924 Paris | Haiti | Bronze | Ludovic Valborge | Shooting | Men's team free rifle | |
| 1924 Paris | Poland | Silver | Józef Lange | Cycling | Men's team pursuit | |
| 1924 Paris | Poland | Silver | Jan Łazarski | Cycling | Men's team pursuit | |
| 1924 Paris | Poland | Silver | Tomasz Stankiewicz | Cycling | Men's team pursuit | |
| 1924 Paris | Poland | Silver | Franciszek Szymczyk | Cycling | Men's team pursuit | |
| 1924 Paris | Portugal | Bronze | António Borges | Equestrian | Team jumping | |
| 1924 Paris | Portugal | Bronze | Luís de Meneses | Equestrian | Team jumping | |
| 1924 Paris | Portugal | Bronze | Hélder de Souza | Equestrian | Team jumping | |
| 1924 Paris | Portugal | Bronze | José Mouzinho | Equestrian | Team jumping | |
| 1924 Paris | Romania | Bronze | Romania national rugby union team | Rugby union | | |
| 1924 Paris | Uruguay | Gold | Uruguay national football team | Football | Men's tournament | |
| 1924 Paris | Yugoslavia * | | | | | |
| 1928 Amsterdam | Chile | Silver | Manuel Plaza | Athletics | Men's marathon | |
| 1928 Amsterdam | Egypt | Gold | El-Sayed Nosseir | Weightlifting | Men's 82.5 kg | |
| 1928 Amsterdam | Ireland | Gold | Pat O'Callaghan | Athletics | Men's hammer throw | |
| 1928 Amsterdam | Philippines | Bronze | Teófilo Yldefonso | Swimming | Men's 200 metre breaststroke | |
| 1932 Los Angeles | Latvia | Silver | Jānis Daliņš | Athletics | Men's 50 kilometres walk | |
| 1932 Los Angeles | Mexico | Silver | Gustavo Huet | Shooting | Men's 50 metre rifle prone | |
| 1936 Berlin | Turkey | Bronze | Ahmet Kireççi | Wrestling | Men's freestyle middleweight | |
| 1948 London | Iran | Bronze | Jafar Salmasi | Weightlifting | Men's 60 kg | |
| 1948 London | Jamaica | Gold | Arthur Wint | Athletics | Men's 400 metres | |
| 1948 London | Panama | Bronze | Lloyd LaBeach | Athletics | Men's 100 metres | |
| 1948 London | Peru | Gold | Edwin Vásquez | Shooting | Men's 50 metre pistol | |
| 1948 London | Puerto Rico | Bronze | Juan Evangelista Venegas | Boxing | Men's bantamweight | |
| 1948 London | South Korea | Bronze | Sung-jip Kim | Weightlifting | Men's 75 kg | |
| 1948 London | Sri Lanka | Silver | Duncan White | Athletics | Men's 400 metres hurdles | |
| 1948 London | Trinidad and Tobago | Silver | Rodney Wilkes | Weightlifting | Men's 60 kg | |
| 1952 Helsinki | Bulgaria | Bronze | Boris Nikolov | Boxing | Men's middleweight | |
| 1952 Helsinki | Lebanon | | | | | |
| 1952 Helsinki | Soviet Union * | | | | | |
| 1952 Helsinki | Venezuela | Bronze | Asnoldo Devonish | Athletics | Men's triple jump | |
| 1956 Melbourne | Bahamas | Bronze | Sloane Farrington | Sailing | Star | |
| 1956 Melbourne | Bahamas | Bronze | Durward Knowles | Sailing | Star | |
| 1956 Melbourne | Iceland | Silver | Vilhjálmur Einarsson | Athletics | Men's triple jump | |
| 1956 Melbourne | Pakistan | Silver | Pakistan men's national field hockey team | Field hockey | Men's tournament | |
| 1956 Melbourne | United Team of Germany (Note: From 1956 to 1964, athletes from East Germany and West Germany competed together as the United Team of Germany.) * | | | | | |
| 1960 Rome | British West Indies * | Bronze | George Kerr | Athletics | Men's 800 metres | |
| 1960 Rome | Chinese Taipei | Silver | Chuan-kwang Yang | Athletics | Men's decathlon | |
| 1960 Rome | Ethiopia | Gold | Abebe Bikila | Athletics | Men's marathon | |
| 1960 Rome | Ghana | Silver | Clement Quartey | Boxing | Men's light welterweight | |
| 1960 Rome | Iraq | Bronze | Abdul-Wahid Aziz | Weightlifting | Men's 67.5 kg | |
| 1960 Rome | Morocco | Silver | Rhadi Ben Abdesselam | Athletics | Men's marathon | |
| 1960 Rome | Singapore | Silver | Howe Liang Tan | Weightlifting | Men's 67.5 kg | |
| 1964 Tokyo | Kenya | Bronze | Wilson Kiprugut | Athletics | Men's 800 metres | |
| 1964 Tokyo | Nigeria | Bronze | Nojim Maiyegun | Boxing | Men's light middleweight | |
| 1964 Tokyo | Tunisia | Silver | Mohammed Gammoudi | Athletics | Men's 10,000 metres | |
| 1968 Mexico City | Cameroon | Silver | Joseph Bessala | Boxing | Men's welterweight | |
| 1968 Mexico City | East Germany * | | | | | |
| 1968 Mexico City | Mongolia | | | | | |
| 1968 Mexico City | Uganda | Bronze | Leo Rwabwogo | Boxing | Men's flyweight | |
| 1968 Mexico City | West Germany * | | | | | |
| 1972 Munich | Colombia | Silver | Helmut Bellingrodt | Shooting | Mixed 50 metre running target | |
| 1972 Munich | Niger | Bronze | Issake Dabore | Boxing | Men's light welterweight | |
| 1972 Munich | North Korea | Gold | Ho-jun Ri | Shooting | Mixed 50 metre rifle prone | |
| 1976 Montreal | Bermuda | Bronze | Clarence Hill | Boxing | Men's heavyweight | |
| 1976 Montreal | Thailand | Bronze | Payao Poontarat | Boxing | Men's light flyweight | |
| 1980 Moscow | Guyana | Bronze | Michael Anthony | Boxing | Men's bantamweight | |
| 1980 Moscow | Tanzania | Silver | Filbert Bayi | Athletics | Men's 3000 metres steeplechase | |
| 1980 Moscow | Zimbabwe | Gold | Zimbabwe women's national field hockey team | Field hockey | Women's tournament | |
| 1984 Los Angeles | Algeria | Bronze | Mustapha Moussa | Boxing | Men's light heavyweight | |
| 1984 Los Angeles | China | Gold | Xu Haifeng | Shooting | Men's 50 metre pistol | |
| 1984 Los Angeles | Dominican Republic | Bronze | Pedro Nolasco | Boxing | Men's bantamweight | |
| 1984 Los Angeles | Ivory Coast | Silver | Gabriel Tiacoh | Athletics | Men's 400 metres | |
| 1984 Los Angeles | Syria | Silver | Joseph Atiyeh | Wrestling | Men's freestyle 100 kg | |
| 1984 Los Angeles | Zambia | Bronze | Keith Mwila | Boxing | Men's light flyweight | |
| 1988 Seoul | Costa Rica | Silver | Silvia Poll | Swimming | Women's 200 metre freestyle | |
| 1988 Seoul | Djibouti | Bronze | Hussein Ahmed Salah | Athletics | Men's marathon | |
| 1988 Seoul | Indonesia | Silver | Lilies Handayani | Archery | Women's team | |
| 1988 Seoul | Indonesia | Silver | Nurfitriyana Saiman | Archery | Women's team | |
| 1988 Seoul | Indonesia | Silver | Kusuma Wardhani | Archery | Women's team | |
| 1988 Seoul | Netherlands Antilles * | Silver | Jan Boersma | Sailing | Men's Division II | |
| 1988 Seoul | Senegal | Silver | Amadou Dia Ba | Athletics | Men's 400 metres hurdles | |
| 1988 Seoul | Suriname | Gold | Anthony Nesty | Swimming | Men's 100 metre butterfly | |
| 1988 Seoul | Virgin Islands | Silver | Peter Holmberg | Sailing | Finn | |
| 1992 Barcelona | Croatia | Bronze | Goran Ivanišević | Tennis | Men's doubles | |
| 1992 Barcelona | Croatia | Bronze | Goran Prpić | Tennis | Men's doubles | |
| 1992 Barcelona | Israel | Silver | Yael Arad | Judo | Women's 61 kg | |
| 1992 Barcelona | Lithuania | Gold | Romas Ubartas | Athletics | Men's discus throw | |
| 1992 Barcelona | Malaysia | Bronze | Jalani Sidek | Badminton | Men's doubles | |
| 1992 Barcelona | Malaysia | Bronze | Razif Sidek | Badminton | Men's doubles | |
| 1992 Barcelona | Namibia | Silver | Frankie Fredericks | Athletics | Men's 100 metres | |
| 1992 Barcelona | Qatar | Bronze | Mohamed Suleiman | Athletics | Men's 1500 metres | |
| 1992 Barcelona | Slovenia | Bronze | Iztok Čop | Rowing | Men's coxless pair | |
| 1992 Barcelona | Slovenia | Bronze | Denis Žvegelj | Rowing | Men's coxless pair | |
| 1996 Atlanta | Armenia | Gold | Armen Nazaryan | Wrestling | Men's Greco-Roman 52 kg | |
| 1996 Atlanta | Azerbaijan | Silver | Namig Abdullayev | Wrestling | Men's freestyle 52 kg | |
| 1996 Atlanta | Belarus | | | | | |
| 1996 Atlanta | Burundi | Gold | Vénuste Niyongabo | Athletics | Men's 5000 metres | |
| 1996 Atlanta | Czech Republic | Bronze | Miroslav Januš | Shooting | Men's 10 metre running target | |
| 1996 Atlanta | Ecuador | Gold | Jefferson Pérez | Athletics | Men's 20 kilometres walk | |
| 1996 Atlanta | Georgia | Bronze | Soso Liparteliani | Judo | Men's 78 kg | |
| 1996 Atlanta | Hong Kong | Gold | Lai Shan Lee | Sailing | Women's Mistral One Design | |
| 1996 Atlanta | Kazakhstan | Gold | Yuriy Melnichenko | Wrestling | Men's Greco-Roman 57 kg | |
| 1996 Atlanta | Moldova | Bronze | Sergei Mureiko | Wrestling | Men's Greco-Roman 130 kg | |
| 1996 Atlanta | Mozambique | Bronze | Maria Mutola | Athletics | Women's 800 metres | |
| 1996 Atlanta | Russia (Note: Despite previously competing at the Olympics since 1900, Russia previously competed as the Russian Empire and Soviet Union, and their medal totals are treated entirely separately.) | | | | | |
| 1996 Atlanta | Slovakia | Bronze | Jozef Gönci | Shooting | Men's 50 metre rifle prone | |
| 1996 Atlanta | Tonga | Silver | Paea Wolfgramm | Boxing | Men's super heavyweight | |
| 1996 Atlanta | Ukraine | Bronze | Andriy Kalashnikov | Wrestling | Men's Greco-Roman 52 kg | |
| 1996 Atlanta | Uzbekistan | Silver | Armen Bagdasarov | Judo | Men's 86 kg | |
| 2000 Sydney | Barbados | Bronze | Obadele Thompson | Athletics | Men's 100 metres | |
| 2000 Sydney | Kuwait | Bronze | Fehaid Al-Deehani | Shooting | Men's double trap | |
| 2000 Sydney | Kyrgyzstan | Bronze | Aidyn Smagulov | Judo | Men's 60 kg | |
| 2000 Sydney | North Macedonia | Bronze | Mogamed Ibragimov | Wrestling | Men's freestyle 85 kg | |
| 2000 Sydney | Saudi Arabia | Silver | Hadi Soua'an Al-Somaily | Athletics | Men's 400 metres hurdles | |
| 2000 Sydney | Vietnam | Silver | Trần Hiếu Ngân | Taekwondo | Women's 57 kg | |
| 2004 Athens | Eritrea | Bronze | Zersenay Tadese | Athletics | Men's 10,000 metres | |
| 2004 Athens | Paraguay | Silver | Paraguay national football team | Football | Men's tournament | |
| 2004 Athens | United Arab Emirates | Gold | Ahmed Al-Maktoum | Shooting | Men's double trap | |
| 2008 Beijing | Afghanistan | Bronze | Rohullah Nikpai | Taekwondo | Men's 58 kg | |
| 2008 Beijing | Mauritius | Bronze | Bruno Julie | Boxing | Men's bantamweight | |
| 2008 Beijing | Samoa | Silver | Ele Opeloge | Weightlifting | Women's +75 kg | |
| 2008 Beijing | Serbia | Silver | Milorad Čavić | Swimming | Men's 100 metre butterfly | |
| 2008 Beijing | Sudan | Silver | Ismail Ahmed Ismail | Athletics | Men's 800 metres | |
| 2008 Beijing | Tajikistan | Bronze | Rasul Boqiev | Judo | Men's 73 kg | |
| 2008 Beijing | Togo | Bronze | Benjamin Boukpeti | Canoeing | Men's slalom K-1 | |
| 2012 London | Bahrain | Gold | Maryam Yusuf Jamal | Athletics | Women's 1500 metres | |
| 2012 London | Botswana | Silver | Nijel Amos | Athletics | Men's 800 metres | |
| 2012 London | Cyprus | Silver | Pavlos Kontides | Sailing | Laser | |
| 2012 London | Gabon | Silver | Anthony Obame | Taekwondo | Men's +80 kg | |
| 2012 London | Grenada | Gold | Kirani James | Athletics | Men's 400 metres | |
| 2012 London | Guatemala | Silver | Érick Barrondo | Athletics | Men's 20 kilometres walk | |
| 2012 London | Montenegro | Silver | Montenegro women's national handball team | Handball | Women's tournament | |
| 2016 Rio de Janeiro | Fiji | Gold | Fiji national rugby sevens team | Rugby sevens | Men's tournament | |
| 2016 Rio de Janeiro | Jordan | Gold | Ahmad Abughaush | Taekwondo | Men's 68 kg | |
| 2016 Rio de Janeiro | Kosovo | Gold | Majlinda Kelmendi | Judo | Women's 52 kg | |
| 2020 Tokyo | Burkina Faso | Bronze | Hugues Fabrice Zango | Athletics | Men's triple jump | |
| 2020 Tokyo | ROC (Note: On February 19, 2021, the IOC announced that Russian athletes would compete at the 2020 Summer Olympics (which was postponed to 2021 due to the COVID-19 pandemic in Russia) and 2022 Winter Olympics under the acronym "ROC", which was the IOC designation of Russian athletes permitted to participate. The designation was instigated following the suspension of the Russian Olympic Committee after the Russian state-sponsored doping scandal. The name of the committee itself in full could not be used to refer to the delegation.) * | Silver | Anastasiia Galashina | Shooting | Women's 10 metre air rifle | |
| 2020 Tokyo | San Marino | Bronze | Alessandra Perilli | Shooting | Women's trap | |
| 2020 Tokyo | Turkmenistan | Silver | Polina Guryeva | Weightlifting | Women's 59 kg | |
| 2024 Paris | Albania | Bronze | Chermen Valiev | Wrestling | Men's freestyle 74 kg | |
| 2024 Paris | Cape Verde | Bronze | Daniel Varela de Pina | Boxing | Men's 51 kg | |
| 2024 Paris | Dominica | Gold | Thea LaFond | Athletics | Women's triple jump | |
| 2024 Paris | Saint Lucia | Gold | Julien Alfred | Athletics | Women's 100 metres | |

== Winter Olympics ==
Key
| ^{*} | Entities that no longer exist |

First time medalists by NOC at the Winter Olympic Games
| Edition | NOC | Medal | Medalist(s) | Sport | Event | Refs |
|---|---|---|---|---|---|---|
| 1924 Chamonix | Austria | Gold | Herma Szabo | Figure skating | Ladies' singles | |
| 1924 Chamonix | Belgium | Bronze | Charles Mulder | Bobsleigh | Four-man | (Note: The rules at the time allowed teams to participate with either four or five man teams in the Bobsleigh event at the 1924 Winter Games.) |
| 1924 Chamonix | Belgium | Bronze | René Mortiaux | Bobsleigh | Four-man | (Note: The rules at the time allowed teams to participate with either four or five man teams in the Bobsleigh event at the 1924 Winter Games.) |
| 1924 Chamonix | Belgium | Bronze | Paul Van den Broeck | Bobsleigh | Four-man | (Note: The rules at the time allowed teams to participate with either four or five man teams in the Bobsleigh event at the 1924 Winter Games.) |
| 1924 Chamonix | Belgium | Bronze | Victor Verschueren | Bobsleigh | Four-man | (Note: The rules at the time allowed teams to participate with either four or five man teams in the Bobsleigh event at the 1924 Winter Games.) |
| 1924 Chamonix | Belgium | Bronze | Henri Willems | Bobsleigh | Four-man | (Note: The rules at the time allowed teams to participate with either four or five man teams in the Bobsleigh event at the 1924 Winter Games.) |
| 1924 Chamonix | Canada | Gold | Canada men's national ice hockey team | Ice hockey | Men's tournament | |
| 1924 Chamonix | Finland | Bronze | Clas Thunberg | Speed skating | Men's 500 metres | |
| 1924 Chamonix | France | Bronze | Georges Berthet | Military patrol | Men's event | |
| 1924 Chamonix | France | Bronze | Camille Mandrillon | Military patrol | Men's event | |
| 1924 Chamonix | France | Bronze | Maurice Mandrillon | Military patrol | Men's event | |
| 1924 Chamonix | France | Bronze | Adrien Vandelle | Military patrol | Men's event | |
| 1924 Chamonix | Great Britain | Bronze | Ethel Muckelt | Figure skating | Ladies' singles | |
| 1924 Chamonix | Norway | Silver | Oskar Olsen | Speed skating | Men's 500 metres | |
| 1924 Chamonix | Norway | Bronze | Roald Larsen | Speed skating | Men's 500 metres | |
| 1924 Chamonix | Sweden | Silver | Johan Petter Åhlén | Curling | Men's event | |
| 1924 Chamonix | Sweden | Silver | Carl August Kronlund | Curling | Men's event | |
| 1924 Chamonix | Sweden | Silver | Ture Ödlund | Curling | Men's event | |
| 1924 Chamonix | Sweden | Silver | Carl Wilhelm Petersén | Curling | Men's event | |
| 1924 Chamonix | Sweden | Silver | Carl Axel Pettersson | Curling | Men's event | |
| 1924 Chamonix | Sweden | Silver | Erik Severin | Curling | Men's event | |
| 1924 Chamonix | Sweden | Silver | Karl Wahlberg | Curling | Men's event | |
| 1924 Chamonix | Sweden | Silver | Victor Wetterström | Curling | Men's event | |
| 1924 Chamonix | Switzerland | Gold | Alfred Aufdenblatten | Military patrol | Men's event | |
| 1924 Chamonix | Switzerland | Gold | Alfons Julen | Military patrol | Men's event | |
| 1924 Chamonix | Switzerland | Gold | Anton Julen | Military patrol | Men's event | |
| 1924 Chamonix | Switzerland | Gold | Denis Vaucher | Military patrol | Men's event | |
| 1924 Chamonix | United States | Gold | Charles Jewtraw | Speed skating | Men's 500 meters | |
| 1924 Chamonix | Mixed team * | | | | | |
| 1928 St. Moritz | Czechoslovakia * | Bronze | Rudolf Burkert | Ski jumping | Men's individual | |
| 1928 St. Moritz | Germany | Bronze | Hans Hess | Bobsleigh | Five-man | |
| 1928 St. Moritz | Germany | Bronze | Sebastian Huber | Bobsleigh | Five-man | |
| 1928 St. Moritz | Germany | Bronze | Hanns Kilian | Bobsleigh | Five-man | |
| 1928 St. Moritz | Germany | Bronze | Valentin Krempl | Bobsleigh | Five-man | |
| 1928 St. Moritz | Germany | Bronze | Hanns Nägle | Bobsleigh | Five-man | |
| 1932 Lake Placid | Hungary | Bronze | Emília Rotter | Figure skating | Pairs | |
| 1932 Lake Placid | Hungary | Bronze | László Szollás | Figure skating | Pairs | |
| 1948 St. Moritz | Italy | Gold | Nino Bibbia | Skeleton | Men's individual | |
| 1952 Oslo | Netherlands | Silver | Kees Broekman | Speed Skating | Men's 5000 metres | |
| 1956 Cortina d'Ampezzo | Japan | Silver | Chiharu Igaya | Alpine skiing | Men's slalom | |
| 1956 Cortina d'Ampezzo | Poland | Bronze | Franciszek Gąsienica Groń | Nordic combined | Men's individual | |
| 1956 Cortina d'Ampezzo | Soviet Union * | Bronze | Pavel Kolchin | Cross-country | Men's 30 kilometre | |
| 1956 Cortina d'Ampezzo | United Team of Germany * | Gold | Ossi Reichert | Alpine skiing | Women's giant slalom | |
| 1964 Innsbruck | North Korea | Silver | Han Pil-hwa | Speed skating | Women's 3000 metres | |
| 1968 Grenoble | East Germany * | Silver | Gabriele Seyfert | Figure skating | Ladies' singles | |
| 1968 Grenoble | Romania | Bronze | Nicolae Neagoe | Bobsleigh | Two-man | |
| 1968 Grenoble | Romania | Bronze | Ion Panțuru | Bobsleigh | Two-man | |
| 1968 Grenoble | West Germany * | Silver | Pepi Bader | Bobsleigh | Two-man | |
| 1968 Grenoble | West Germany * | Silver | Horst Floth | Bobsleigh | Two-man | |
| 1972 Sapporo | Spain | Gold | Francisco Fernández Ochoa | Alpine skiing | Men's slalom | |
| 1976 Innsbruck | Liechtenstein | Bronze | Hanni Wenzel | Alpine skiing | Women's slalom | |
| 1980 Lake Placid | Bulgaria | Bronze | Ivan Lebanov | Cross-country skiing | Men's 30 kilometre | |
| 1984 Sarajevo | Yugoslavia * | Silver | Jure Franko | Alpine Skiing | Men's giant slalom | |
| 1992 Albertville | China | Silver | Ye Qiaobo | Speed skating | Women's 500 metres | |
| 1992 Albertville | Luxembourg | Silver | Marc Girardelli | Alpine skiing | Men's super-G | |
| 1992 Albertville | New Zealand | Silver | Annelise Coberger | Alpine skiing | Women's slalom | |
| 1992 Albertville | South Korea | Silver | Kim Yoon-man | Speed skating | Men's 1000 metres | |
| 1994 Lillehammer | Australia | Bronze | Steven Bradbury | Short-track speed skating | Men's 5000 metre relay | (Note: John Kah, who was a reserve member of the team, did not receive a medal.) |
| 1994 Lillehammer | Australia | Bronze | Kieran Hansen | Short-track speed skating | Men's 5000 metre relay | (Note: John Kah, who was a reserve member of the team, did not receive a medal.) |
| 1994 Lillehammer | Australia | Bronze | Andrew Murtha | Short-track speed skating | Men's 5000 metre relay | (Note: John Kah, who was a reserve member of the team, did not receive a medal.) |
| 1994 Lillehammer | Australia | Bronze | Richard Nizielski | Short-track speed skating | Men's 5000 metre relay | (Note: John Kah, who was a reserve member of the team, did not receive a medal.) |
| 1994 Lillehammer | Belarus | Silver | Igor Zhelezovski | Speed skating | Men's 1000 metres | |
| 1994 Lillehammer | Kazakhstan | Silver | Vladimir Smirnov | Cross-country skiing | Men's 10 kilometre classical | |
| 1994 Lillehammer | Russia | | | | | |
| 1994 Lillehammer | Slovenia | Bronze | Alenka Dovžan | Alpine skiing | Women's combined | |
| 1994 Lillehammer | Ukraine | Bronze | Valentina Tserbe-Nessina | Biathlon | Women's sprint | |
| 1994 Lillehammer | Uzbekistan | Gold | Lina Cheryazova | Freestyle skiing | Women's aerials | |
| 1998 Nagano | Denmark | Silver | Jane Bidstrup | Curling | Women's tournament | |
| 1998 Nagano | Denmark | Silver | Dorthe Holm | Curling | Women's tournament | |
| 1998 Nagano | Denmark | Silver | Helena Blach Lavrsen | Curling | Women's tournament | |
| 1998 Nagano | Denmark | Silver | Margit Pörtner | Curling | Women's tournament | |
| 1998 Nagano | Denmark | Silver | Trine Qvist | Curling | Women's tournament | |
| 1998 Nagano | Czech Republic | Silver | Kateřina Neumannová | Cross-country skiing | Women's 5 kilometre classical | |
| 2002 Salt Lake | Croatia | Gold | Janica Kostelić | Alpine skiing | Women's combined | |
| 2002 Salt Lake | Estonia | Gold | Andrus Veerpalu | Cross-country skiing | Men's 15 kilometre classical | |
| 2006 Turin | Latvia | Bronze | Mārtiņš Rubenis | Luge | Men's singles | |
| 2006 Turin | Slovakia | Silver | Radoslav Židek | Snowboarding | Men's snowboard cross | |
| 2022 Beijing | ROC * | Silver | Natalya Nepryayeva | Cross-country skiing | Women's 15 km skiathlon | |
| 2026 Milan–Cortina d'Ampezzo | Brazil | Gold | Lucas Pinheiro Braathen | Alpine skiing | Men's giant slalom | |
| 2026 Milan–Cortina d'Ampezzo | Georgia | Silver | Luka Berulava | Figure skating | Pairs | |
| 2026 Milan–Cortina d'Ampezzo | Georgia | Silver | Anastasiia Metelkina | Figure skating | Pairs | |

== See also ==
- List of first Olympic gold medalists by country
- All-time Olympic Games medal table
- Olympic sports
