= Sweden at the 1924 Winter Olympics =

- IOC code: SWE
- NOC: Swedish Olympic Committee
- Website: www.sok.se (in Swedish and English)

in Chamonix
- Competitors: 31 (men) in 7 sports
- Flag bearers: Ruben Rundquist, ice hockey (official)
- Medals Ranked 7th: Gold 1 Silver 1 Bronze 0 Total 2

Winter Olympics appearances (overview)
- 1924; 1928; 1932; 1936; 1948; 1952; 1956; 1960; 1964; 1968; 1972; 1976; 1980; 1984; 1988; 1992; 1994; 1998; 2002; 2006; 2010; 2014; 2018; 2022; 2026

Athletes from Sweden competed in the 1924 Winter Olympics in Chamonix, France.

== Medalists ==
Medal	Name	Sport	Event
Gold	Gillis Grafström	Figure skating	Men's singles
Silver	Carl Wilhelm Petersén; Carl August Kronlund; Johan Petter Åhlén; Ture Ödlund; Carl Axel Pettersson; Erik Severin; Karl Wahlberg; Victor Wetterström	Curling	Men's event

== Cross-country skiing ==
Men

Event	Athlete	Race	
Event	Athlete	Time	Rank
18 km	Erik Winnberg	1'20:29.4	10
18 km	Torkel Persson	1'19:29.8	9
18 km	Elis Sandin	1'19:24.0	8
18 km	Per-Erik Hedlund	1'17:49.0	6
50 km	Per-Erik Hedlund	DNF	–
50 km	Oskar Lindberg	4'07:44	8
50 km	Ernst Alm	4'06:31	6
50 km	Torkel Persson	4'05:59	5

== Curling ==
Summary

Team	Event	Group stage		
Team	Event	Opposition Score	Opposition Score	Rank
Carl August Kronlund; Carl Wilhelm Petersén; Carl Axel Pettersson; Erik Severin; Karl Wahlberg; Victor Wetterström; Johan Petter Åhlén; Ture Ödlund	Men's tournament	(France) FRA; W 18–10	(United Kingdom) GBR; L 7–38	2nd place, silver medalist(s)

Note: Two separate Swedish teams competed at the curling event.

Team	GP	W	L	PF	PA	PTS
Great Britain	2	2	0	84	11	4
Sweden (silver)	2	1	1	25	48	2
France	2	0	2	14	64	0

Team 1	Score	Team 2
Sweden (I)	18-10	France
Great Britain	38-7	Sweden (II)

Pos.	Player
skip	Carl Wilhelm Petersén
	Carl August Kronlund
skip	Johan Petter Åhlén
	Ture Ödlund
	Carl Axel Pettersson
	Erik Severin
	Karl Wahlberg
	Victor Wetterström

== Figure skating ==
Men

Athlete	Event	CF	FS	Points	Places	Final rank
Gillis Grafström	Men's singles	1	2	367.89	10	1st place, gold medalist(s)

== Ice hockey ==
Summary

Team	Event	First round				Medal round		
Team	Event	Opposition Score	Opposition Score	Opposition Score	Rank	Opposition Score	Opposition Score	Rank
Sweden men's	Men's tournament	Switzerland; W 9–0	Canada; L 0–22	Czechoslovakia; W 9–3	2 Q	United States; L 0–20	Great Britain; L 3–4	4

=== Group A ===
The top two teams (highlighted) advanced to the medal round.

Team	GP	W	L	GF	GA
Canada	3	3	0	85	0
Sweden	3	2	1	18	25
Czechoslovakia	3	1	2	14	41
Switzerland	3	0	3	2	53

28 Jan	Sweden	9:0 (3:0,3:0,3:0)	Switzerland
29 Jan	Canada	22:0 (5:0,7:0,10:0)	Sweden
31 Jan	Sweden	9:3 (5:1,1:1,3:1)	Czechoslovakia

=== Medal round ===
Results from the group round (Canada-Sweden and United States-Great Britain) carried forward to the medal round.

Team	GP	W	L	GF	GA
Canada	3	3	0	47	3
United States	3	2	1	32	6
Great Britain	3	1	2	6	33
Sweden (4th)	3	0	3	3	46

1 Feb	United States	20:0 (5:0,7:0,8:0)	Sweden
2 Feb	Great Britain	4:3 (0:1,2:2,2:0)	Sweden

4th	Sweden
	Ruben Allinger (Djurgårdens IF); Wilhelm Arwe (Djurgårdens IF); Eric Burman (IK Göta); Birger Holmqvist (IK Göta); Gustaf Johansson (IK Göta); Helge Johansson (Djurgårdens IF); Carl Josefsson (Nacka SK); Ernst Karlberg (Djurgårdens IF); Nils Molander (Berliner SC); Ejnar Olsson (IK Göta)

== Nordic combined ==
Events:

- 18 km cross-country skiing
- normal hill ski jumping

The cross-country skiing part of this event was combined with the main medal event of cross-country skiing. Those results can be found above in this article in the cross-country skiing section. Some athletes (but not all) entered in both the cross-country skiing and Nordic combined event, their time on the 18 km was used for both events. One would expect that athletes competing at the Nordic combined event, would participate in the cross-country skiing event as well, as they would have the opportunity to win more than one medal. This was not always the case due to the maximum number of athletes (here: 4) could represent a country per event.

The ski jumping (normal hill) event was held separate from the main medal event of ski jumping, results can be found in the table below.

Athlete	Event	Ski Jumping				Cross-country			Total	
Athlete	Event	Distance 1	Distance 2	Total points	Rank	Time	Points	Rank	Points	Rank
Axel-Herman Nilsson	Individual	42.5	40.5	16.500	7	1'31:17	11.625	6	14.063	5
Menotti Jakobsson	Individual	42.5	41.0	16.895	4	1'37:10	8.750	15	12.823	8
Nils Lindh	Individual	–	–	–	–	1'43:58	5.375	21	DNF	–

== Ski jumping ==
Athlete	Event	Jump 1			Jump 2			
Athlete	Event	Distance	Points	Rank	Distance	Points	Total	Rank
Nils Sundh	Normal hill	41.5	16.293	12	41.0	16.500	16.397	12
Nils Lindh	Normal hill	41.0	16.667	9	41.5	16.808	16.738	9
Axel-Herman Nilsson	Normal hill	42.5	16.960	7	44.0	17.333	17.147	6
Menotti Jakobsson	Normal hill	43.0	17.167	5	42.0	17.000	17.083	7

== Speed skating ==
Men

Event	Athlete	Race	
Event	Athlete	Time	Rank
500 m	Axel Blomqvist	45.2	6
500 m	Eric Blomgren	46.6	11
1500 m	Axel Blomqvist	2:36.4	13
5000 m	Eric Blomgren	9:41.6	12
5000 m	Axel Blomqvist	9:48.8	15

All-round
Distances: 500m; 5000m; 1500m & 10,000m.

Athlete	Until distance 1			Until distance 2			Until distance 3			Total		
Athlete	Points	Score	rank	Points	Score	rank	Points	Score	rank	Points	Score	rank
Axel Blomqvist	4	45.20	4	14	104.08	7	18	156.21	6	DNF		
Eric Blomgren	8	46.60	8	16	102.06	9	DNF					
