= T. S. Robertson-Aikman =

Scottish soldier and curler

- Curler
- Born: Thomas Stokes George Hughes Robertson-Aikman; 25 February 1860; New Parks, England
- Died: 18 April 1948 (aged 88); Hamilton, Scotland
Medal record
Men's curling
Representing Great Britain
Olympic Games
Gold medal – first place	1924 Chamonix	Team

Lt.-Col. Thomas Stokes George Hughes Robertson-Aikman CB (25 February 1860 – 18 April 1948) was a Scottish soldier and curler.

== Early life ==
Robertson-Aikman was educated at the Eton College and the Brasenose College, Oxford.

== Soldier ==
Robertson-Aikman joined the 1st battalion, Royal Lanark Militia, in 1880. The following year the militia regiment was merged with the Highland Light Infantry (HLI). He commanded the 4th battalion HLI 1900–12, and during World War I, he commanded a district of the Royal Defence Corps. He was appointed a Companion of the [[Order of the Bath}} (CB) in the 1923 Birthday Honours.

== Curler ==
Robertson-Aikman was non-playing captain of the British curling team which won the gold medal at the 1924 Winter Olympics in Chamonix (France). Other team members were Laurence Jackson, Robin Welsh, William K. Jackson, Thomas Murray, John McLeod, William Brown and D. G. Astley. Sweden and France won the silver and bronze medals respectively.

== See also ==
- Curling at the 1924 Winter Olympics
