= Curling at the Winter Olympics =

- IOC Code: CUR
- Governing body: WCF
- Events: 3 (men: 1; women: 1; mixed: 1)

Winter Olympics
- 1924; 1928; 1932; 1936; 1948; 1952; 1956; 1960; 1964; 1968; 1972; 1976; 1980; 1984; 1988; 1992; 1994; 1998; 2002; 2006; 2010; 2014; 2018; 2022; 2026; Note: demonstration or exhibition sport years indicated in italics
- Medalists

Curling was included in the program of the inaugural Winter Olympic Games in 1924 in Chamonix although the results of that competition were not considered official by the International Olympic Committee until 2006. Curling was a demonstration sport at the 1932 Games, and then again after a lengthy absence in 1988 and 1992. The sport was finally added to the official program for the 1998 Games in Nagano.

Until 2018, only men's and women's events were contested. An additional event, mixed doubles, was rejected for 2010 because the Olympic Programme Commission felt it had not developed enough, but was approved for the 2018 Winter Olympics at an IOC Executive Board meeting in June 2015.

The related ice stock sport (Eisstockschießen in German) was a demonstration event in 1936 and 1964. These events are not considered additional demonstrations of curling.

== Events ==
• = official event, (d) = demonstration event

Event	24	28	32	36	48	52	56	60	64	68	72	76	80	84	88	92	94	98	02	06	10	14	18	22	26	Years
Men's tournament	•		(d)												(d)	(d)		•	•	•	•	•	•	•	•	12
Women's tournament															(d)	(d)		•	•	•	•	•	•	•	•	10
Mixed doubles																							•	•	•	3
Total events	1		1												2	2		2	2	2	2	2	3	3	3	

== Participating nations ==
The final placement for each team in each tournament is shown in the following tables.

Men's tournament

Nation	24	98	02	06	10	14	18	22	26	Years
Canada	–	2nd place, silver medalist(s)	2nd place, silver medalist(s)	1st place, gold medalist(s)	1st place, gold medalist(s)	1st place, gold medalist(s)	4	3rd place, bronze medalist(s)	1st place, gold medalist(s)	8
China	–	–	–	–	8	4	–	5	10	4
Czech Republic	–	–	–	–	–	–	–	–	8	1
Denmark	–	–	7	–	9	6	10	10	–	5
Finland	–	–	5	2nd place, silver medalist(s)	–	–	–	–	–	2
France	3rd place, bronze medalist(s)	–	10	–	7	–	–	–	–	3
Germany	–	8	6	8	6	10	–	–	7	6
Great Britain	1st place, gold medalist(s)	7	8	4	5	2nd place, silver medalist(s)	5	2nd place, silver medalist(s)	2nd place, silver medalist(s)	9
Italy	–	–	–	7	–	–	9	9	6	4
Japan	–	6	–	–	–	–	8	–	–	2
New Zealand	–	–	–	10	–	–	–	–	–	1
Norway	–	3rd place, bronze medalist(s)	1st place, gold medalist(s)	5	2nd place, silver medalist(s)	5	6	6	4	8
ROC	–	–	–	–	–	–	–	8	–	1
Russia	–	–	–	–	–	7	–	–	–	1
South Korea	–	–	–	–	–	–	7	–	–	1
Sweden	2nd place, silver medalist(s)	5	4	9	4	3rd place, bronze medalist(s)	2nd place, silver medalist(s)	1st place, gold medalist(s)	9	9
Switzerland	–	1st place, gold medalist(s)	3rd place, bronze medalist(s)	6	3rd place, bronze medalist(s)	8	3rd place, bronze medalist(s)	7	3rd place, bronze medalist(s)	8
United States	–	4	9	3rd place, bronze medalist(s)	10	9	1st place, gold medalist(s)	4	5	8

Note: The three medal winners in 1924 were the only teams entered that year.

Women's tournament

Nation	98	02	06	10	14	18	22	26	Years
Canada	1st place, gold medalist(s)	3rd place, bronze medalist(s)	3rd place, bronze medalist(s)	2nd place, silver medalist(s)	1st place, gold medalist(s)	6	5	3rd place, bronze medalist(s)	8
China	–	–	–	3rd place, bronze medalist(s)	7	5	7	10	5
Denmark	2nd place, silver medalist(s)	9	9	5	6	10	9	7	8
Germany	8	5	–	6	–	–	–	–	3
Great Britain	4	1st place, gold medalist(s)	5	7	3rd place, bronze medalist(s)	4	1st place, gold medalist(s)	6	8
Italy	–	–	10	–	–	–	–	9	2
Japan	6	8	7	8	5	3rd place, bronze medalist(s)	2nd place, silver medalist(s)	8	8
Norway	5	7	4	–	–	–	–	–	3
Olympic Athletes from Russia	–	–	–	–	–	9	–	–	1
ROC	–	–	–	–	–	–	10	–	1
Russia	–	10	6	9	9	–	–	–	4
South Korea	–	–	–	–	8	2nd place, silver medalist(s)	8	5	4
Sweden	3rd place, bronze medalist(s)	6	1st place, gold medalist(s)	1st place, gold medalist(s)	2nd place, silver medalist(s)	1st place, gold medalist(s)	3rd place, bronze medalist(s)	1st place, gold medalist(s)	8
Switzerland	–	2nd place, silver medalist(s)	2nd place, silver medalist(s)	4	4	7	4	2nd place, silver medalist(s)	7
United States	7	4	8	10	10	8	6	4	8

Mixed doubles tournament

Nation	18	22	26	Years
Australia	–	10	–	1
Canada	1st place, gold medalist(s)	5	5	3
China	4	9	–	2
Czech Republic	–	6	8	2
Estonia	–	–	10	1
Finland	7	–	–	1
Great Britain	–	4	4	2
Italy	–	1st place, gold medalist(s)	3rd place, bronze medalist(s)	2
Norway	3rd place, bronze medalist(s)	2nd place, silver medalist(s)	6	3
Olympic Athletes from Russia	DQB	–	–	1
South Korea	5	–	9	2
Sweden	–	3rd place, bronze medalist(s)	1st place, gold medalist(s)	2
Switzerland	2nd place, silver medalist(s)	7	7	3
United States	6	8	2nd place, silver medalist(s)	3

== Medal table ==
Sources (after the 2026 Winter Olympics):
Accurate as of 2026 Winter Olympics

Rank	Nation	Gold	Silver	Bronze	Total
1	Canada	7	3	4	14
2	Sweden	6	3	4	13
3	Great Britain	3	3	1	7
4	Switzerland	1	4	4	9
5	Norway	1	2	2	5
6	United States	1	1	1	3
7	Italy	1	0	1	2
8	Japan	0	1	1	2
9	Denmark	0	1	0	1
9	Finland	0	1	0	1
9	South Korea	0	1	0	1
12	China	0	0	1	1
12	France	0	0	1	1
Totals (13 entries)		20	20	20	60

== Medal summary ==
=== Men ===
Games	Gold	Silver	Bronze
1924 Chamonix	Great Britain	Sweden	France
1928 → 1994	Not included in the Olympic programme		
1998 Nagano	Switzerland	Canada	Norway
2002 Salt Lake City	Norway	Canada	Switzerland
2006 Turin	Canada	Finland	United States
2010 Vancouver	Canada	Norway	Switzerland
2014 Sochi	Canada	Great Britain	Sweden
2018 Pyeongchang	United States	Sweden	Switzerland
2022 Beijing	Sweden	Great Britain	Canada
2026 Milano Cortina	Canada	Great Britain	Switzerland

=== Women ===
Games	Gold	Silver	Bronze
1998 Nagano	Canada	Denmark	Sweden
2002 Salt Lake City	Great Britain	Switzerland	Canada
2006 Turin	Sweden	Switzerland	Canada
2010 Vancouver	Sweden	Canada	China
2014 Sochi	Canada	Sweden	Great Britain
2018 Pyeongchang	Sweden	South Korea	Japan
2022 Beijing	Great Britain	Japan	Sweden
2026 Milano Cortina	Sweden	Switzerland	Canada

=== Mixed doubles ===
Games	Gold	Silver	Bronze
2018 Pyeongchang	Canada	Switzerland	Norway
2022 Beijing	Italy	Norway	Sweden
2026 Milano Cortina	Sweden	United States	Italy

== See also ==
- List of Olympic venues in curling
- Wheelchair curling at the Winter Paralympics
- Ice stock sport at the Winter Olympics, a similar sport
- Curling at the Youth Olympic Games
