= Gufflet =

Gufflet is a surname. Notable people with the surname include:

- Maurice Gufflet (1863–1915), French sailor and Olympian, brother of Robert
- Robert Gufflet (1883–1933), French sailor and Olympian, brother of Maurice
