= Carl Petersen =

Carl Petersen may refer to:

- Carl Wilhelm Petersen (1868–1933), German politician and first mayor of Hamburg
- Carl Petersen (runner) (1902–1983), Danish Olympic athlete
- Carl Emil Petersen (1875–1971), American Medal of Honor recipient
- Carl Petersén (army officer) (1883–1963), Swedish military officer
- Carl Wilhelm Petersén (1884–1973), Swedish curler
- Carl Petersen (Danish politician) (1894–1984), Danish politician of the Social Democratic Party
- Carl Petersen (neuroscientist), Denmark-born Swiss neuroscientist at EPFL
- Carl Friedrich Petersen (1809–1892), Hamburg lawyer and politician
- Carl Petersen (architect) (1874–1923), Danish architect of the Nordic Classicism movement
- Sandy Petersen (born 1955), American programmer

== See also ==
- Johan Carl Christian Petersen (1813–1880), Danish seaman and interpreter
- Carl Peterson (disambiguation)
- Carl Pettersson (disambiguation)
