= Ödlund =

Ödlund is a surname, commonly used in Sweden. Notable people with the surname include:

- Karin Ödlund (1959–2005), Swedish footballer
- Ture Ödlund (1894–1942), Swedish curler
