= Carl Pettersson (disambiguation) =

Carl Pettersson (born 1977) is a Swedish golfer.

Carl Pettersson may also refer to:

- Carl Emil Pettersson (1875–1937), Swedish sailor and inspiration for Ephraim Longstocking
- Carl Axel Pettersson (1874–1962), Swedish curler

== See also ==
- Carl Peterson (disambiguation)
- Carl Petersen (disambiguation)
