= Harry Jefferson =

Harry Jefferson may refer to:

- Harry Jefferson (racing driver) (born 1946), American NASCAR driver
- Harry Jefferson (sailor) (1849–1918), British sailor
- Harry R. Jefferson, (1899–1966) American football, basketball, and baseball coach and college athletics administrator
