= Henri Gilardoni =

French sailor

Personal information
- Full name: Henri Joseph Marcel Gilardoni
- Born: 28 January 1876 Paris, France
- Died: 21 May 1937 (aged 61) Pargny-sur-Saulx, France

Sport

Sailing career
- Class(es): 3 to 10 ton Open class
Medal record
Sailing
Representing France
Olympic Games
Gold medal – first place	1900 Paris	3 to 10 ton 1st race

Henri Joseph Marcel Gilardoni (28 January 1876 – 21 May 1937) was a French sailor who competed in the 1900 Summer Olympics in Paris, France. Gilardoni took the gold in the 1st race of the 3 to 10 ton.
