= Pierre Moussette =

French sailor

Personal information
- Full name: Pierre Constantin Moussette
- Born: 8 September 1861 Paris, Second French Empire
- Died: 7 February 1932 (aged 70) Paris, France

Sailing career
- Sport: Sailing
- Club: CVP; Yacht Club de France
- Class(es): 3 to 10 ton Open class

Pierre Constantin Moussette (8 September 1861 – 7 February 1932) was a French sailor who competed in the 1900 Summer Olympics in Paris. Moussette took the 6th in the 2nd race of the 3 to 10 ton.
