= Carl Peterson (disambiguation) =

Carl Peterson (born 1943) is a National Football League team president.

Carl Peterson may also refer to:

- Carl Peterson (Australian footballer) (born 1987), Australian rules footballer
- Carl Peterson (One Life to Live), character on the soap opera One Life to Live
- Carl H. Peterson (1895–1979), American politician from Nebraska
- Carl Jerrold Peterson (1936–1969), U.S. Navy officer
- Carl Peterson (American football) (1897–1964), American football player
- C. Donald Peterson (1918–1987), American politician and jurist from Minnesota

== See also ==
- Carl Petersen (disambiguation)
- Carl Pettersson (disambiguation)
