= John Howard Taylor =

Australian politician and sailor

Howard Taylor
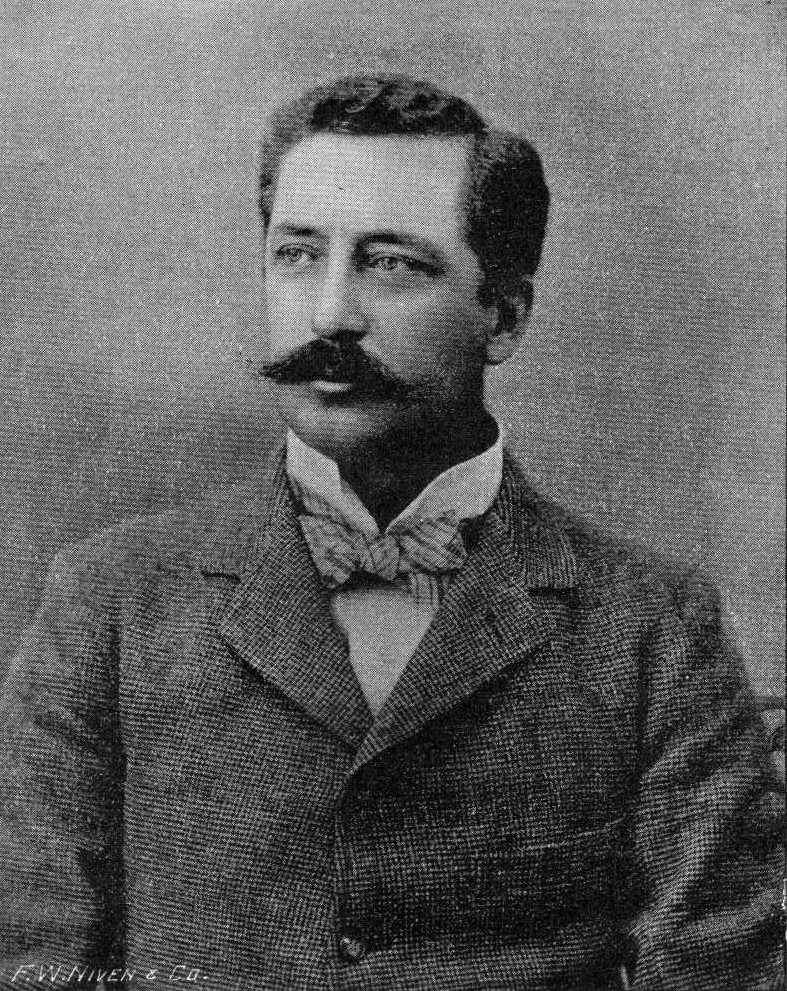
- John Howard Taylor as pictured in the History of West Australia

Personal information
- Full name: John Howard Taylor
- Nationality: British
- Born: 30 June 1861 Peckham, England
- Died: 1 October 1925 (aged 64) Melbourne, Australia

Sport

Sailing career
- Class: 3 to 10 ton
Medal record
Sailing
Representing Mixed team
Olympic Games
Bronze medal – third place	1900 Paris	3 to 10 ton 2nd race

John Howard Taylor (30 June 1861, Peckham - 1 October 1925, Melbourne) also known as J. Howard Taylor and Howard Taylor, was a Western Australian stockbroker, politician and Olympic sailor.

== Life ==
Taylor was born in 1861 in Peckham, to John and Mary Jane Cash. He worked in stockbroker's office in London and in 1880s he emigrated to South Africa and then to Western Australia in early 1890 following the Ashburton rush. In January 1891, he settled in Southern Cross, where he worked as a merchant and stockbroker. Three years later, he moved his operations at Coolgardie, where a promising gold field had been just discovered. Sitting at the town council, he was elected on 3 August 1896 one of the three members of the Western Australian Legislative Council for the East Province. He was one of the ten Western Australia representatives at the 1897-1898 Australasian Federal Convention, which prepared the federation. He left the council in 1899 to focus on speculative developments. He made estimated 250,000 pounds in speculating in Australia, before moving back to Europe to speculate on London Stock Exchange.

In late 1890s, Taylor bought from Prince Luigi Amedeo, Duke of the Abruzzi a racing cutter Bona Fide (or just Bona), build for the duke in 1897. Taylor began competing in sailing races in Mediterranean winning Queen's Cup at Royal Cork Regatta in 1899 and 16 races in 25 starts in 1900 season. That year he also participated in 1900 Summer Olympics sailing competitions in Paris, France. Taylor missed the first race of the Olympic regattas, as he was delayed obtaining clearance by French Customs, but he arrived at Meulan in time for the second race which he won by a margin of more than five minutes, taking the gold in the 3 to 10 ton class. After the Olympic, Taylor sold his winning yacht.

Taylor's speculations on London Stock Exchange were initially successful, but in few years left him broke. He returned to Australia and lived until death in Melbourne where he regularly played bridge. He was one-time member Coolgardie Masonic Lodge and Royal Yacht Club. He gave name to Howard Street in Perth.

== Death ==
Taylor died in 1925 in Melbourne and was buried in Fawkner Cemetery, Melbourne.
