= Edward Hore =

British sailor

Personal information
- Full name: Edward Hore
- Nationality: British
- Born: 17 November 1849 Knightsbridge, England
- Died: unknown

Sport

Sailing career
- Class(es): 3 to 10 ton 10 to 20 ton
- Club: Royal London Yacht Club, Cowes
Medal record
Sailing
Representing Great Britain
Olympic Games
| Gold medal – first place | 1900 Paris | 3 to 10 ton 2nd race |
| Bronze medal – third place | 1900 Paris | 10 to 20 ton 2nd race |

Edward Hore (born 17 November 1849, date of death unknown) was a British sailor who competed in the 1900 Summer Olympics in Meulan, France. Hore took the gold in the second race of the 3 to 10 ton and a bronze in the 10 to 20 ton.
