= Robert Gufflet =

French sailor

Personal information
- Born: 5 June 1883 Bordeaux, France
- Died: 2 January 1933 (aged 49) Casablanca, French Tunisia

Sailing career
- Sport: Sailing
- Club: Cercle de la Voile d'Arcachon
- Class(es): 3 to 10 ton Open class
Medal record
Sailing
Representing France
Olympic Games
Bronze medal – third place	1900 Paris	3 to 10 ton 1st race
Silver medal – second place	1900 Paris	3 to 10 ton 2nd race

Robert Gufflet (5 June 1883 in Bordeaux – 2 January 1933 in Casablanca) was a French sailor who competed at the 1900 Summer Olympics. Gufflet took the gold in the first race of the 3 to 10 ton and the silver medal in the second race of that class. He also competed in the 1928 Summer Olympics.
