= Nils Lindh =

Swedish ski jumper (1889–1957)

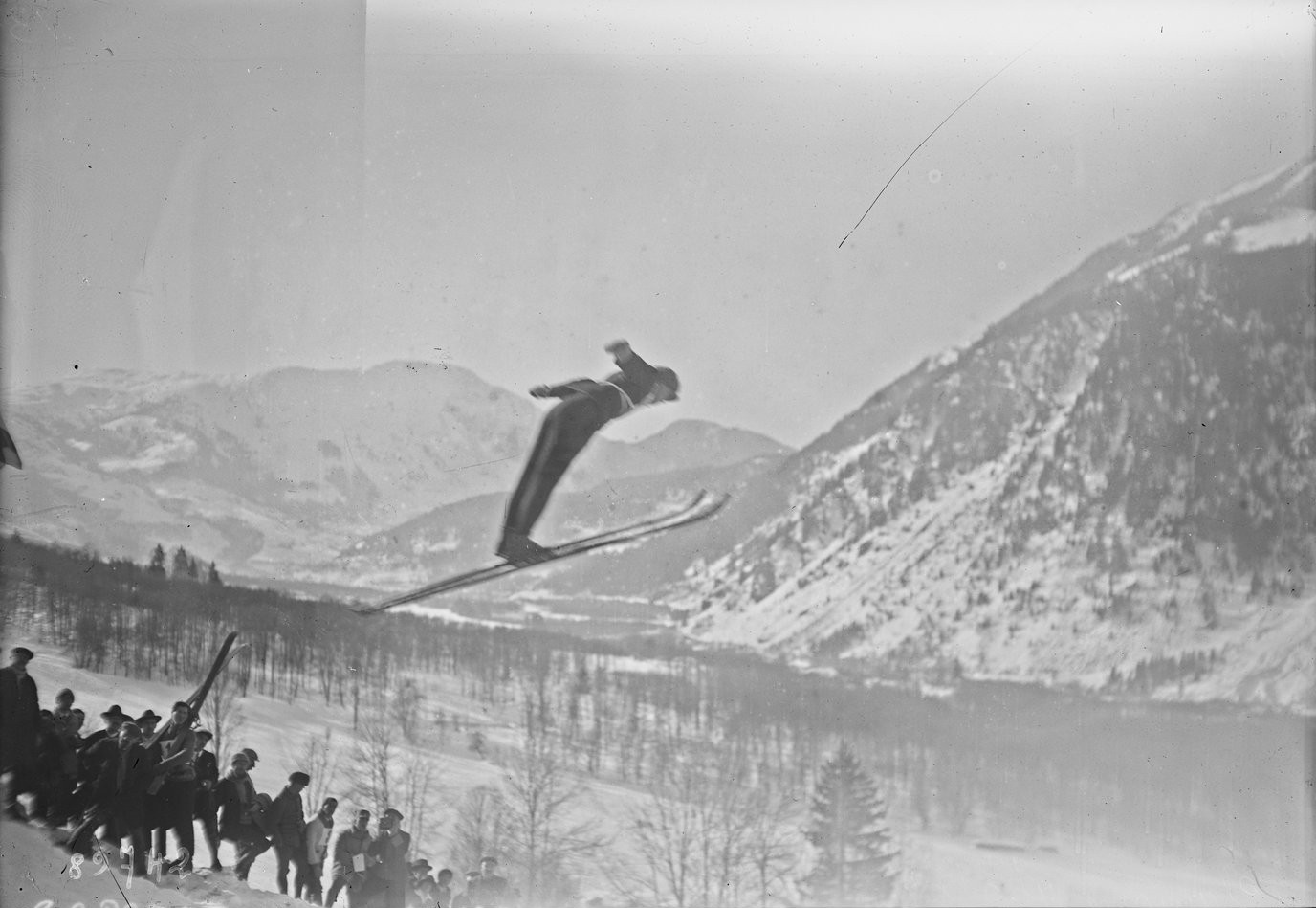
- Nils Lindh in 1924

Personal information
- Full name: Nils Erik Lindh
- Nationality: Swedish
- Born: 23 October 1889; Stockholm, Sweden-Norway
- Died: 6 February 1957 (aged 67); Stockholm, Sweden

Sport
- Sport: Ski jumping

Nils Erik Lindh (23 October 1889 – 6 February 1957) was a Swedish ski jumper. He competed in the individual event at the 1924 Winter Olympics.

Lindh represented Djurgårdens IF. He won three Swedish championship titles in ski jumping in the 1910s.
