= Sailing at the 1900 Summer Olympics – 3 to 10 ton =

3 to 10 Ton Sailing at the Games of the II Olympiad
- 3 - 10 Ton Class
- Venue: Meulan
- Date: First race: May 24, 1900; Second race: May 25, 1900
- Competitors: 20 (documented) from 3 nations
- Teams: 11

Medalists
1st place, gold medalist(s)		Henri Gilardoni	France
1st place, gold medalist(s)		Edward Hore, Harry Jefferson, Howard Taylor	Great Britain
2nd place, silver medalist(s)		Henri Smulders, Chris Hooijkaas, Arie van der Velden	Netherlands
2nd place, silver medalist(s)		Maurice Gufflet, A. Dubois, J. Dubois, Robert Gufflet, Charles Guiraist	France
3rd place, bronze medalist(s)		Maurice Gufflet, A. Dubois, J. Dubois, Robert Gufflet, Charles Guiraist	France
3rd place, bronze medalist(s)		H. MacHenry	United States

The 3 to 10 ton was a sailing event on the Sailing at the 1900 Summer Olympics program in Meulan. Eleven boats started during the two races in the 3 to 10 ton. Twenty sailors are documented, besides the France and Great Britain participants there was a Mixed country team from the US and Great Britain. The races were held on 24 and 25 May 1900 on the river Seine.

== Race schedule ==
●	Meulan competition	●	Le Havre competition

1900	May								August					
1900	20 Sun	21 Mon	22 Tue	23 Wed	24 Thu	25 Fri	26 Sat	27 Thu	1 Fri	2 Sat	3 Sun	4 Mon	5 Tue	6 Wed
3 to 10 ton					●	●								
Total gold medals					1	1								

== Course area and course configuration ==
For the 3 to 10 ton the 19 kilometres (10 nmi) course in the Meulan course area was used.

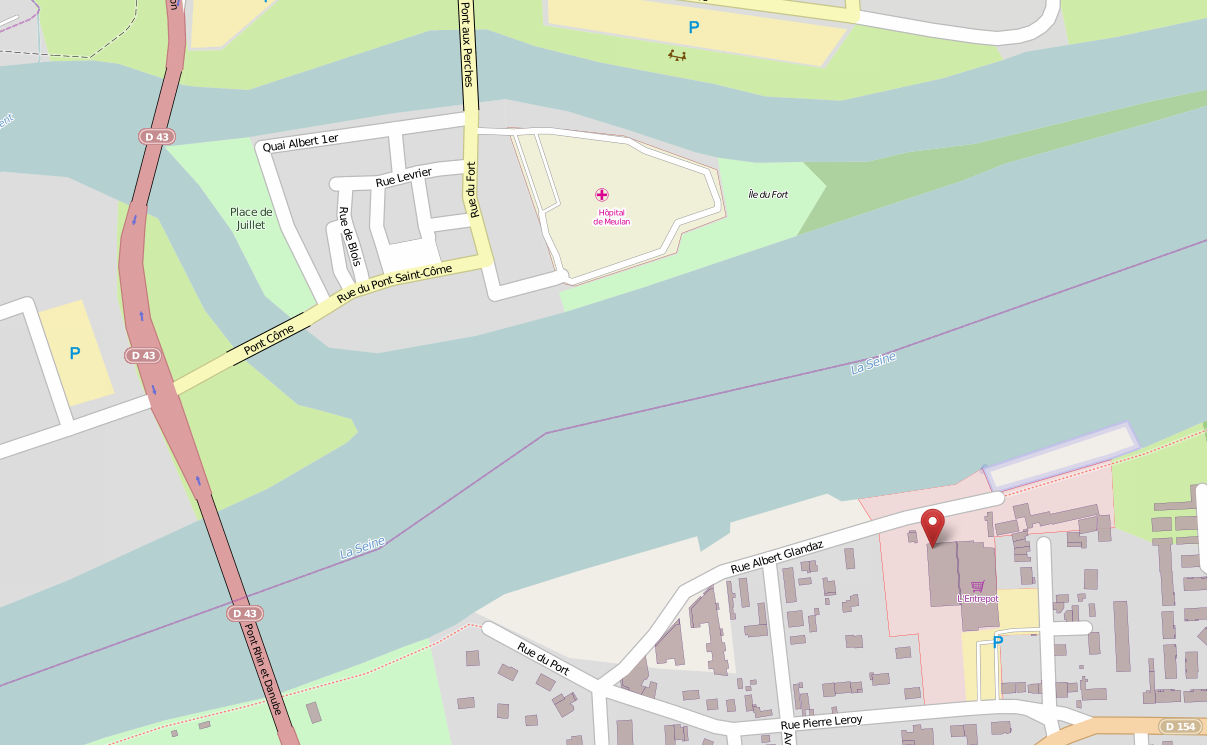
Course area Meulan

== Weather conditions ==
The race was troublesome due to an almost complete absence of any wind and the existing wind was perpendicular to the course (river Seine) and blocked or diverted by trees and buildings.

== Final results ==
Two separate races were sailed. No combined results were made.

=== Race of 24 May 1900 ===
Rank	Country	Helmsman	Crew	Boat	Medalrace	
Rank	Country	Helmsman	Crew	Boat	Pos.	Pts.
1st place, gold medalist(s)	France	Henri Gilardoni	Unknown	Fémur	1	03:45:02
2nd place, silver medalist(s)	Netherlands	Henri Smulders	Chris Hooijkaas; Arie van der Velden	Mascotte	2	03:46:52
3rd place, bronze medalist(s)	France	Maurice Gufflet	A. Dubois; J. Dubois; Robert Gufflet; Charles Guiraist	Gitana	3	03:52:02
4	France	Émile Michelet	Unknown	Turquoise	4	03:55:16
5	France	Leroy	Unknown	Mascaret	5	04:01:35
6	France	William Martin	Unknown	Pirouette	6	04:18:18
7	United States	H. MacHenry	Unknown (Howard Taylor Great Britain is sometimes mentioned as a crewman, but is only known to have designed Frimousse, not sailed it.)	Frimousse	7	Unknown
8	France	Henry Maingot	Unknown	Gyp	8	Unknown
9	France	François Texier	Auguste Texier	Singy	9	Unknown
DNF	United States	Daniel Ridgway Knight	Unknown	Sans-Gene	DNF	Unknown

Legend:
Gender: – male; – female;

=== Race of 25 May 1900 ===
Rank	Country	Helmsman	Crew	Boat	Medalrace	
Rank	Country	Helmsman	Crew	Boat	Pos.	Pts.
1st place, gold medalist(s)	Great Britain	Edward Hore	Harry Jefferson; Howard Taylor	Bona Fide	1	04:14:58
2nd place, silver medalist(s)	France	Maurice Gufflet	A. Dubois; J. Dubois; Robert Gufflet; Charles Guiraist	Gitana	2	04:35:44
3rd place, bronze medalist(s)	United States	H. MacHenry	Unknown	Frimousse	3	04:38:49
4	Netherlands	Henri Smulders	Chris Hooijkaas; Arie van der Velden	Mascotte	4	04:46:36
5	France	Leroy	Unknown	Mascaret	5	05:08:51
6	France	Pierre Moussette	Unknown	Marsouin	6	05:16:50
7	France	William Martin	Unknown	Pirouette	7	05:30:07
DSQ	France	Émile Michelet	Unknown	Turquoise	DSQ	

Legend: DNF – Did not finish;
Gender: – male; – female;

== Notes ==
Mixed country teams during the 1900 Olympics are grouped together under the ZZX IOC code.

== Other information ==
Initially only the race on 24 May 1900 was part of the Olympic program. However the race on the 25 May 1900, initially part of the Exposition Universelle program, was afterwards awarded with an Olympic status.
