= Axel-Herman Nilsson =

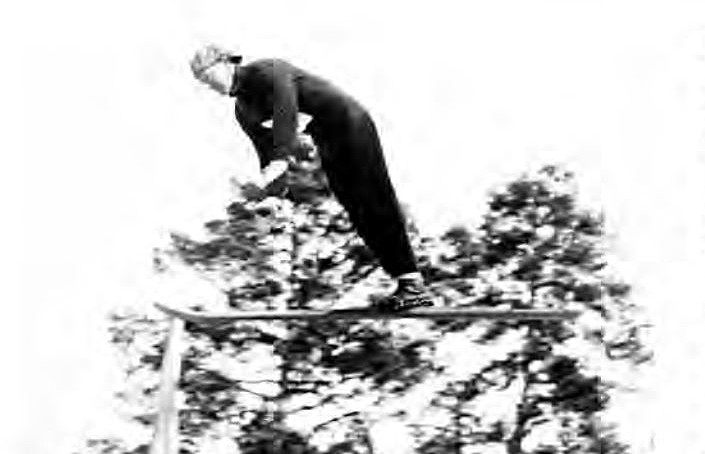
Nilsson making a record jump of 41,5 metres in Saltsjöbaden.

Axel-Herman Nilsson (31 December 1894 – 12 May 1969) was a Swedish Nordic skier who competed in the 1920s. He was born and died in Stockholm. Nilsson competed in the first two Winter Olympics in the individual large hill ski jumping, finishing sixth in the 1924 competition and fourth in 1928 event. He also finished fifth in the Nordic combined competition in 1924.

Nilsson represented Djurgårdens IF. He was three-time Swedish champion in ski jumping in 1922–1924 for Djurgårdens IF.
