= Carl Petersen (neuroscientist) =

Denmark-born Swiss neuroscientist

Carl Christian Holger Petersen
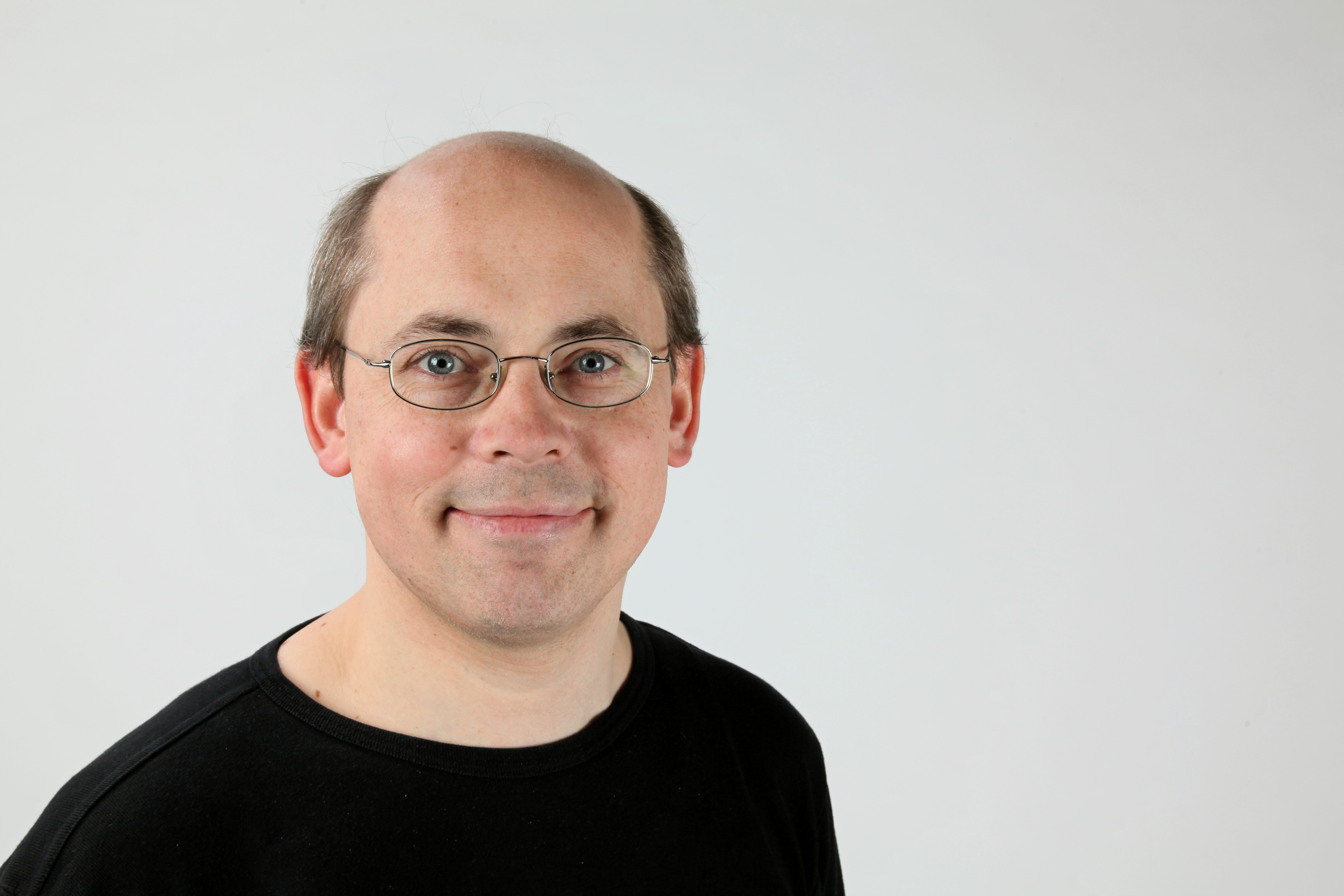
- Carl Petersen in 2009
- Born: Copenhagen, Denmark
- Education: University of Oxford (BSc); University of Cambridge (PhD)
- Scientific career
- Fields: Neuroscience
- Workplaces: École Polytechnique Fédérale de Lausanne
- Doctoral advisor: Michael Berridge
- Website: epfl.ch/labs/lsens/

Carl Christian Holger Petersen is a Professor of neuroscience at the École Polytechnique Fédérale de Lausanne (EPFL) in Switzerland.

== Professional Biography ==
Carl Petersen obtained a BSc in physics from the University of Oxford in 1992. During his PhD studies under the supervision of Prof. Sir Michael Berridge at the University of Cambridge (1992-1996), he investigated cellular and molecular mechanisms of calcium signalling. In his first postdoctoral period (1996-1998), he joined the laboratory of Prof. Roger Nicoll at the University of California San Francisco (UCSF) to investigate synaptic transmission and plasticity in the hippocampus. During a second postdoctoral period, in the laboratory of Prof. Bert Sakmann at the Max Planck Institute for Medical Research in Heidelberg (1999-2003), he began working on the primary somatosensory barrel cortex, investigating cortical circuits and sensory processing. Carl Petersen joined the Brain Mind Institute of the School of Life Sciences at the École Polytechnique Fédérale de Lausanne (EPFL) in 2003, setting up the Laboratory of Sensory Processing to investigate the functional operation of neural circuits in awake mice during quantified behavior. Carl Petersen served as the Director of the EPFL Brain Mind Institute from 2019 to 2022 promoting quantitative multidisciplinary research into neural structure, function, dysfunction, computation and therapy through technological advances.

== Personal life ==
Carl Petersen is the son of Ole Holger Petersen, a professor of physiology at Cardiff University.
