= Armand Bénédic =

French curler (1875–1960)

Personal information
- Nationality: French
- Born: 26 August 1875 Paris
- Died: 20 October 1962 (aged 87)

Sport
- Sport: Curling
Medal record
Representing France
Olympic Games
| Bronze medal – third place | 1924 Chamonix | Team |

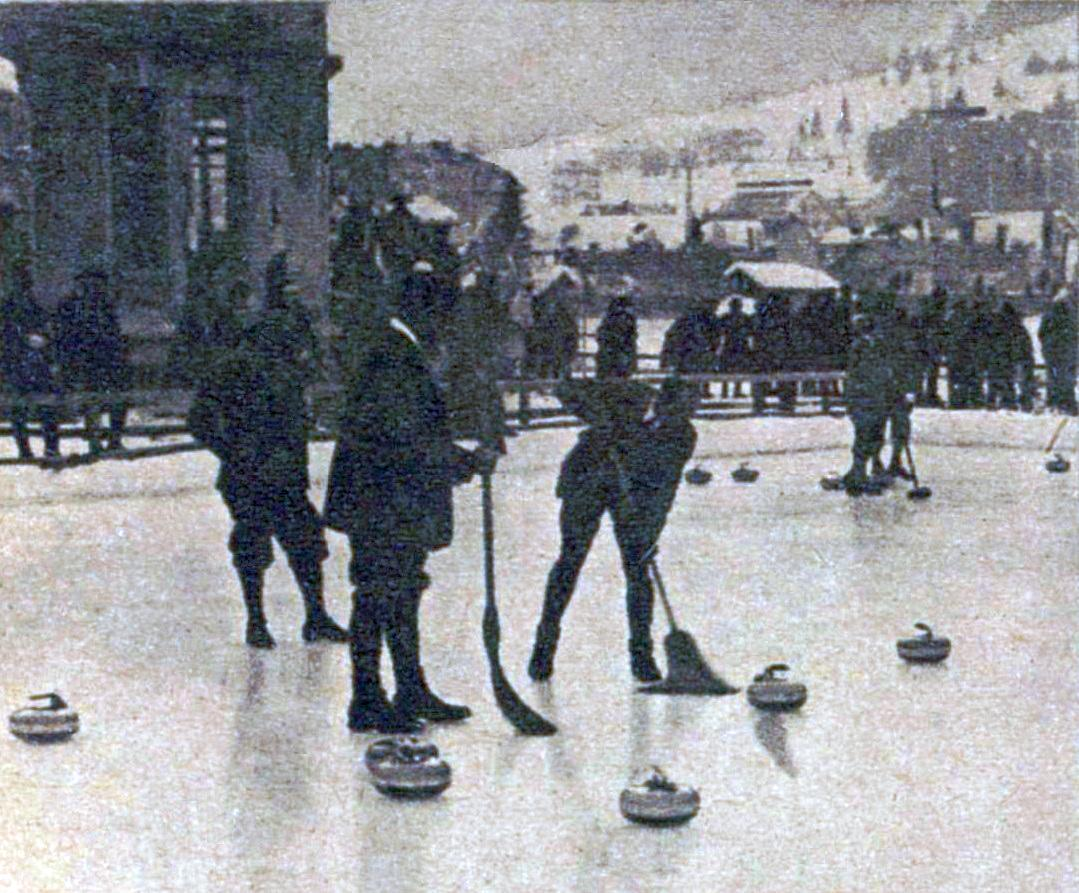
Sweden-France curling match (Chamonix Olympic Games 1924, 18–10 January 28).jpg

Armand Bénédic (26 August 1875 – 26 October 1960) was a French curler. He was born in Paris. He won a bronze medal at the 1924 Winter Olympics in Chamonix.
