= Henri Cournollet =

French curler and Olympian (1882–1971)

Personal information
- Nationality: French
- Born: 19 December 1882 Villers-sur-Mer
- Died: 10 August 1971 (aged 88)

Sport
- Sport: Curling
Medal record
Representing France
Olympic Games
Bronze medal – third place	1924 Chamonix	Team

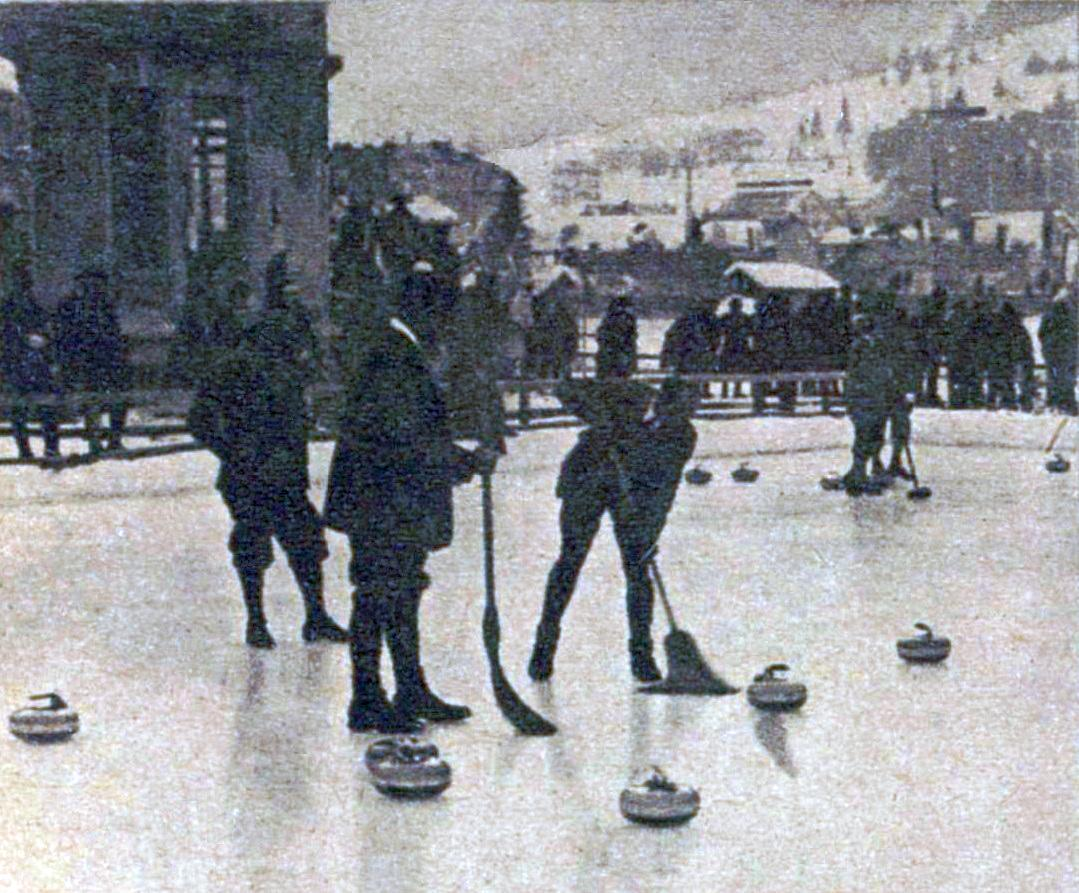
Henri Cournollet

Fernand Henri Jean Cournollet (19 December 1882 – 10 August 1971) was a French curler. He was born in Villers-sur-Mer. He won a bronze medal at the 1924 Winter Olympics in Chamonix.
