= Georges André =

French bobsledder and curler (1876–1945)

Personal information
- Nationality: French
- Born: 26 July 1876 Paris, France
- Died: 19 March 1945 (aged 68) Versailles, France

Sport
- Sport: Curling and bobsleigh
Medal record
Representing France
Men's curling
Olympic Games
Bronze medal – third place	1924 Chamonix	Team

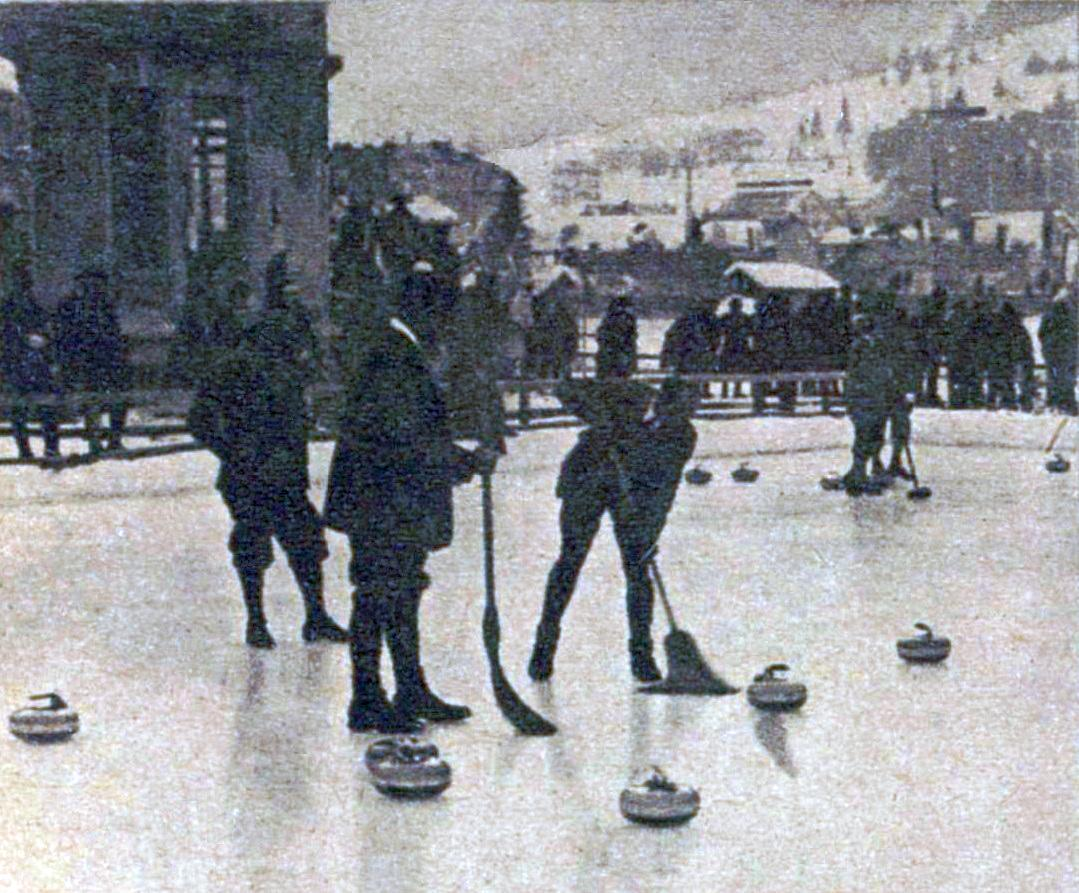
Sweden-France curling match (Chamonix Olympic Games 1924, 18–10 January 28).jpg

Georges Jules André (26 July 1876 – 19 March 1945) was a French curler who won bronze at the Winter Olympics 1924. In the four-man bobsleigh competition of the same Olympics, he was fourth.
