= Pierre Canivet =

French curler and Olympian

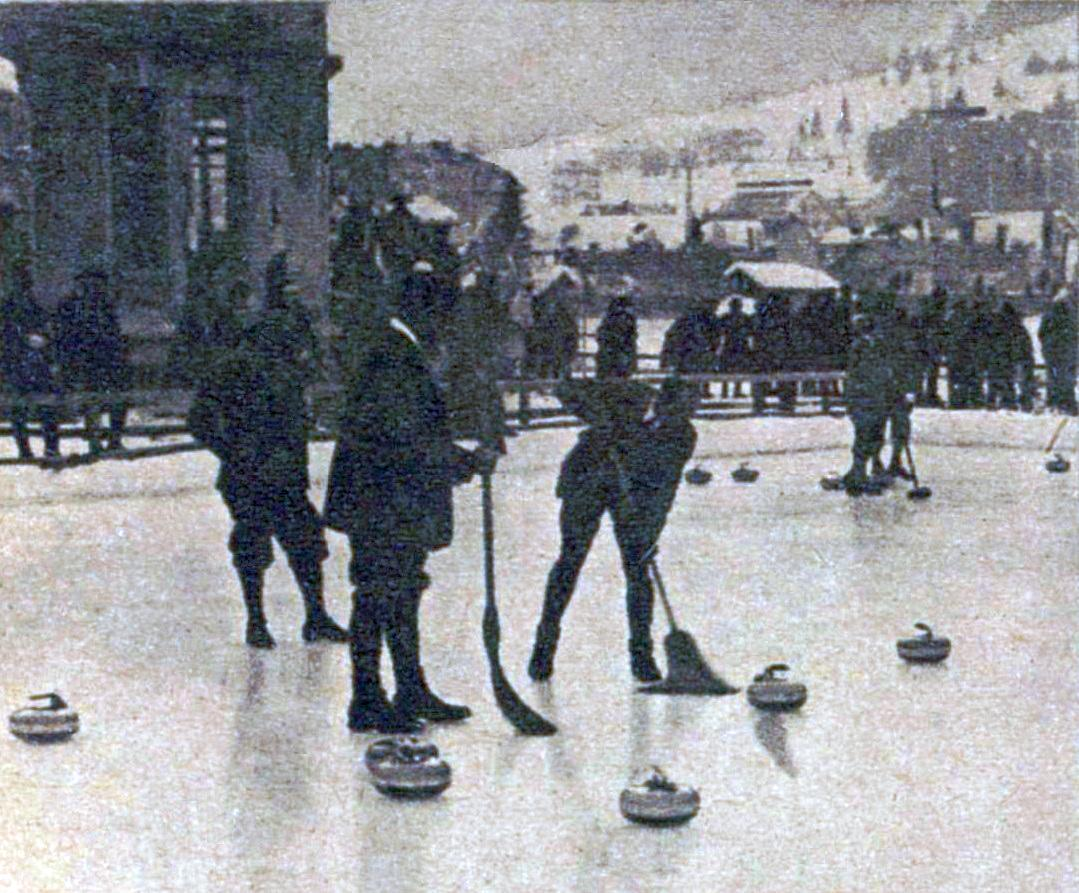
- The Curling meeting in Sweden-France (JO de Chamonix 1924, 18–10 January 28)

Personal information
- Nationality: French
- Born: 22 May 1890 Paris
- Died: 25 January 1982 (aged 91)

Sport
- Sport: Curling and tennis
Medal record
Representing France
Men's curling
Olympic Games
| Bronze medal – third place | 1924 Chamonix | Team |

Pierre Canivet (22 May 1890 – 25 January 1982) was a French curler and tennis player. He was born in Paris. He won a bronze medal with the French curling team at the 1924 Winter Olympics in Chamonix.
