= Henri Smulders =

Dutch sailor (1863–1933)

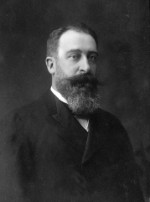

Personal information
- Full name: Henricus Petrus Augustinus Johannes Smulders
- Born: 9 August 1863 's-Hertogenbosch, Netherlands
- Died: 8 November 1933 (aged 70) Paris, France

Sport

Sailing career
- Class(es): 3 to 10 ton Open class
- Club: KNZ&RV
Medal record
Sailing
Representing Netherlands
Olympic Games
Silver medal – second place	1900 Paris	3 to 10 ton 1st race

Henricus Petrus Augustinus Johannes "Henri" Smulders (9 August 1863 – 8 November 1933) was a Dutch sailor who competed in the 1900 Summer Olympics in Paris, France. With crew Chris Hooykaas and Arie van der Velden Smulders took the silver in the 1st race and the 4th place in the second race of the 3 to 10 ton.
