= Arie van der Velden =

Dutch sailor (1881–1967)

Personal information
- Full name: Arie van der Velden
- Born: 12 December 1881 Rotterdam, Netherlands
- Died: 6 December 1967 (aged 85) Rotterdam, Netherlands
- Height: 173 cm (5 ft 8 in)

Sport

Sailing career
- Class(es): 3 to 10 ton Open class
Medal record
Sailing
Representing Netherlands
Olympic Games
Silver medal – second place	1900 Paris	3 to 10 ton 1st race

Arie van der Velden (12 December 1881 – 6 December 1967) was a Dutch sailor who competed in the 1900 Summer Olympics in Paris, France. With helmsman Henri Smulders and fellow crew Chris Hooykaas, Van der Velde took the silver in the 1st race and the 4th place in the second race of the 3 to 10 ton.
