= Menotti Jakobsson =

Swedish skier (1892–1970)

Personal information
- Nationality: Swedish
- Born: 7 July 1892 Stockholm, Sweden-Norway
- Died: 26 December 1970 (aged 78)

Sport
- Sport: Ski jumping Nordic combined skiing

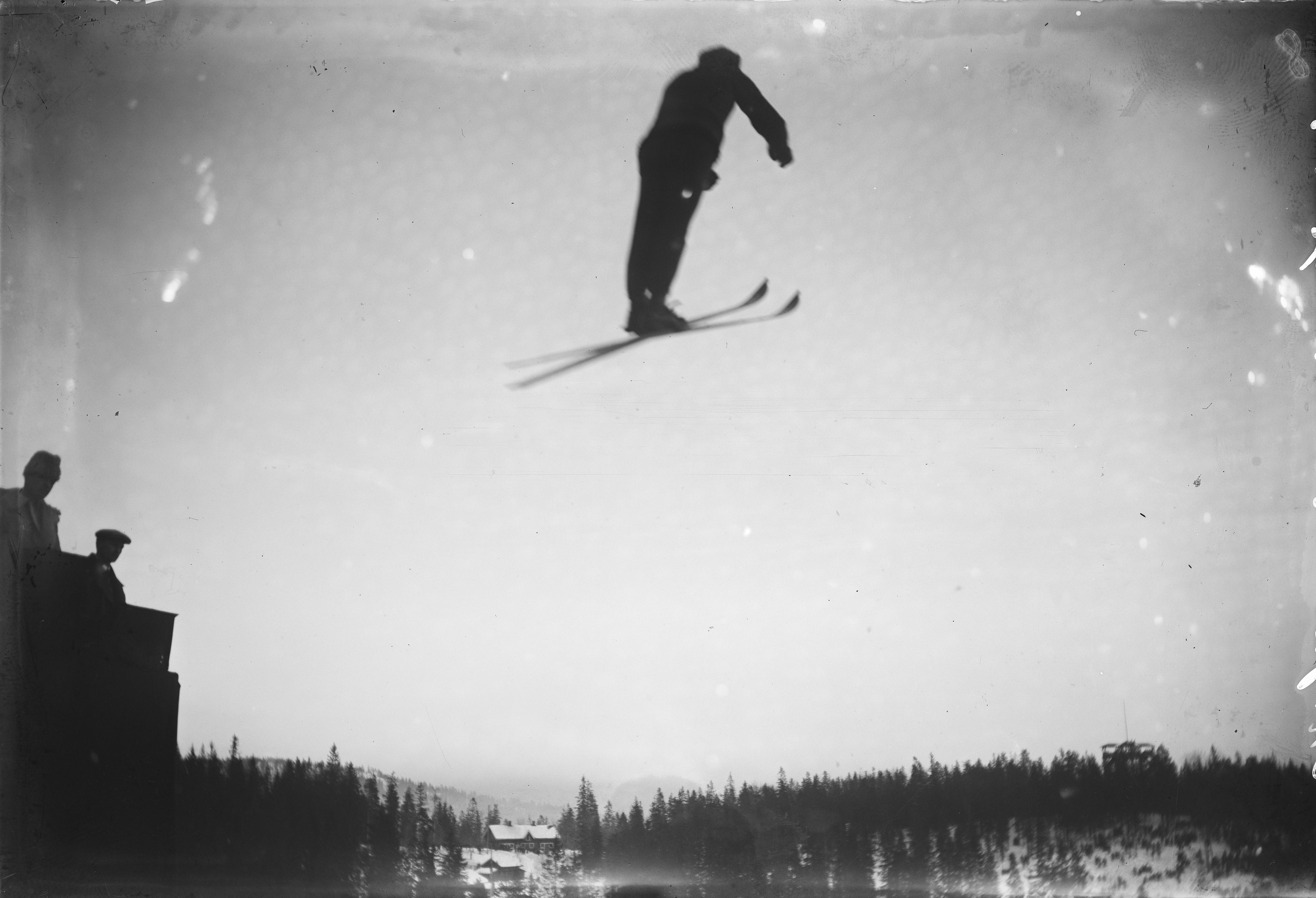
Skiplater 1917 - no-nb digifoto 20140612 00004 NB NS NM 02804.jpg

Menotti Jakobsson (7 July 1892 – 26 December 1970) was a Swedish skier. He was born in Stockholm. He competed in ski jumping and Nordic combined at the 1924 Winter Olympics in Chamonix.

Menotti Jakobsson represented Djurgårdens IF.
