= Chris Hooijkaas =

Dutch sailor (1861–1926)

Personal information
- Full name: Christoffel Hooijkaas
- Born: 6 January 1861 Rotterdam, Netherlands
- Died: 15 October 1926 (aged 65) Rotterdam, Netherlands
- Height: 169 cm (5 ft 7 in)

Sport

Sailing career
- Class(es): 3 to 10 ton Open class
- Club: De Maas; KNZ&RV
Medal record
Sailing
Representing Netherlands
Olympic Games
Silver medal – second place	1900 Paris	3 to 10 ton 1st race

Christoffel Hooijkaas (6 January 1861 – 15 October 1926) was a Dutch sailor who competed in the 1900 Summer Olympics in Meulan, France. With helmsman Henri Smulders and fellow crew Arie van der Velden, Hooijkaas took the silver in the 1st race and the 4th place in the second race of the 3 to 10 ton.
