= Maurice Gufflet =

French sailor

Personal information
- Full name: Henri Napoléon Marie Maurice Gufflet
- Nationality: French
- Born: 15 August 1863 Port Louis, British Mauritius
- Died: 22 April 1915 (aged 51) Bordeaux, France

Sailing career
- Sport: Sailing
- Class(es): 3 to 10 ton Open class
Medal record
Sailing
Representing France
Olympic Games
Bronze medal – third place	1900 Paris	3 to 10 ton 1st race
Silver medal – second place	1900 Paris	3 to 10 ton 2nd race

Henri Napoléon Marie Maurice Gufflet (15 August 1863 – 22 April 1915) was a French sailor who competed in the 1900 Summer Olympics in Meulan, France. Gufflet took the gold in the first race of the 3 to 10 ton and the silver medal in the second race of that class.
