= Harry Jefferson (sailor) =

British sailor

Personal information
- Full name: Harry Wyndham Jefferson
- Nationality: British
- Born: 9 March 1849 Mumbai, Company Raj
- Died: 23 June 1918 (aged 69) Alcombe, Somerset, England

Sport

Sailing career
- Class: 3 to 10 ton
Medal record
Sailing
Representing United Kingdom
Olympic Games
Gold medal – first place	1900 Paris	3 to 10 ton 2nd race

Harry Jefferson (9 March 1849 – 23 June 1918) was a British sailor who competed in the 1900 Summer Olympics in Paris, France. Jefferson took the gold in the second race of the 3 to 10 ton.

In 1885, Jefferson set up the stock-jobbing firm Wedd Jefferson in partnership with George Wedd.
