= Curling at the 1924 Winter Olympics =

Curling at the I Olympic Winter Games
- Dates: 28−30 January 1924

Medalists
1st place, gold medalist(s)		Great Britain
2nd place, silver medalist(s)		Sweden
3rd place, bronze medalist(s)		France

The curling event at the 1924 Winter Olympics was contested only by men. It was the first curling event in Olympic history.

In February 2006, a few days before the start of the 2006 Winter Olympics, the International Olympic Committee ruled that the curling medals were part of the official Olympic programme in 1924, and not a demonstration event as many authoritative sources had previously claimed - the IOC itself had never done so.

This official confirmation was the culmination of an investigative campaign begun by the Glasgow-based newspaper The Herald, on behalf of the families of the eight British contestants who won the first curling gold medals. The winning team had been selected by the Royal Caledonian Curling Club, Perth.

== Medals ==
Games	Gold	Silver	Bronze
Men's	Great Britain; William K. Jackson (skip); Robin Welsh; Thomas Murray; Laurence Jackson; T. S. Robertson-Aikman (non-playing captain) (alt.); John McLeod (alt.); William Brown (alt.); D. G. Astley (alt.)	Sweden; Johan Petter Åhlén (skip); Carl Axel Pettersson; Karl Wahlberg; Carl August Kronlund; Carl Wilhelm Petersén (skip); Ture Ödlund; Victor Wetterström; Erik Severin	France; Henri Cournollet (skip); Pierre Canivet; Armand Bénédic; Georges André; Henri Aldebert (alt.); Robert Planque (alt.)

Note: R. Cousin of Great Britain is listed in the Official Report as a "Non-Participant" and it is not known if he received a medal; however, Skip William Jackson of Great Britain is also listed in the Official Report as a "Non-Participant"

== Round robin results ==
France, Great Britain and Sweden were the only countries to participate. A full Swiss team is listed as attending as "a Non-Participating team", indicating they withdrew before the draw.

All games were 18 ends in length.

=== Standings ===
Place	Team	Wins	Losses	Points
1	Great Britain	2	0	4
2	Sweden	1	1	2
3	France	0	2	0

=== Draw 1 ===
Monday 28 January 1924; 10:00 am

Team	Final
Sweden	18
France	10

=== Draw 2 ===
Tuesday 29 January 1924; 10:00 am

Team	Final
Great Britain	38
Sweden	7

=== Draw 3 ===
Wednesday 30 January 1924; 10:00 am

Team	Final
Great Britain	46
France	4
