= Thomas Murray (curler) =

Scottish curler (1877–1944)

- Curler
- Born: Thomas Blackwood Murray; 3 October 1877; Biggar, South Lanarkshire, Scotland
- Died: 3 June 1944 (aged 66); Biggar, South Lanarkshire, Scotland
Medal record
Men's curling
Representing Great Britain
Olympic Games
Gold medal – first place	1924 Chamonix	Team

Thomas Blackwood Murray (3 October 1877 in Biggar, South Lanarkshire – 3 June 1944) was a Scottish curler. He was part of the Royal Caledonian Curling Club team which won the first Olympic gold medal in curling at the inaugural Winter Olympics in Chamonix, France, in 1924.

== See also ==
- Curling at the 1924 Winter Olympics
