= Laurence Jackson =

Scottish curler (1900–1984)

- Curler
- Born: 16 September 1900; Carnwath, South Lanarkshire, Scotland
- Died: 27 July 1984 (aged 83); Biggar, South Lanarkshire, Scotland
Medal record
Men's curling
Representing Great Britain
Olympic Games
Gold medal – first place	1924 Chamonix	Team

Laurence Jackson (16 September 1900 in Carnwath, South Lanarkshire – 27 July 1984 in Biggar, South Lanarkshire) was a Scottish curler. He was part of the Royal Caledonian Curling Club team that won the first Olympic Gold medal in curling at the inaugural Winter Olympics in Chamonix, France, in 1924.

He was the son of fellow gold-medalist Willie Jackson.

== See also ==
- Curling at the 1924 Winter Olympics
