= William Jackson (curler) =

Scottish curler (1871–1955)

Willie Jackson
- Curler
- Born: William Kilgour Jackson; 14 March 1871; Lamington, South Lanarkshire, Scotland
- Died: 26 January 1955 (aged 83); Symington, South Lanarkshire, Scotland
Medal record
Men's curling
Representing Great Britain
Olympic Games
| Gold medal – first place | 1924 Chamonix | Team |

William Kilgour Jackson (14 March 1871 in Lamington, South Lanarkshire – 26 January 1955 in Symington) was a Scottish curler. He was the skip of the Royal Caledonian Curling Club team which won the first Olympic Gold medal in curling at the inaugural Winter Olympics in Chamonix, France, in 1924.

Jackson ran his family's farm in Symington. He was one of the top skips in Scotland at the time. He served as vice president of the Royal Club in 1922–23 and 1931–32 and served as president from 1933–34.

He was the father of fellow gold-medallist Laurence Jackson.

== See also ==
- Curling at the 1924 Winter Olympics
