= Robin Welsh =

Scottish sportsman (1869–1934)

- Born: 20 October 1869 Edinburgh, Scotland
- Died: 21 October 1934 (aged 65) Edinburgh, Scotland
- School: George Watson's College

Rugby union career
- Position: Wing
Amateur team(s)
Years	Team	Apps	(Points)
-	Watsonians		
Provincial / State sides
Years	Team	Apps	(Points)
-	Edinburgh District		
-	Cities District		
International career
Years	Team	Apps	(Points)
1895–96	Scotland	4	(3)
Refereeing career
Years	Competition		Apps
1901-05	Scottish Unofficial Championship		
1902-05	Home Nations		3

46th President of the Scottish Rugby Union
- In office 1925–1926
- Preceded by: Robert Campbell MacKenzie
- Succeeded by: James Aikman Smith
Medal record
Men's curling
Representing Great Britain
Olympic Games
Gold medal – first place	1924 Chamonix	Team

Robin Welsh (20 October 1869 – 21 October 1934) was a Scottish sportsman who represented the Royal Caledonian Curling Club as a curler in the Winter Olympics, represented Scotland in tennis and played international rugby union for Scotland.

== Rugby Union career ==
=== Amateur career ===
He played for Watsonians.

=== Provincial career ===
He played for Edinburgh District. He also played for Cities District.

=== International career ===
He was capped four times for Scotland between 1895 and 1896.

=== Referee career ===
He was an international referee. He refereed the England versus Ireland match in 1902; the Wales versus England match in 1903; and the Ireland versus England match in 1905.

He refereed in the Scottish Unofficial Championship.

=== Administrative career ===
He was President of the Scottish Rugby Union for the period 1925 to 1926.

== Curling career ==
He was part of the Royal Caledonian Curling Club team which won the first Olympic Gold medal in curling at the inaugural Winter Olympics in Chamonix, France, in 1924.

== See also ==
- Curling at the 1924 Winter Olympics
