= Delaval Astley =

British curler (1868–1951)

Major Delaval Astley CB DL
- Born: Delaval Graham L'Estrange Astley; 7 December 1868
- Died: 17 May 1951 (aged 82)
- Other names: D. G. Astley
- Spouse: Kate Clark (1897-1951)
- Children: Joan Doreen Astley; Betty L'Estrange Astley
- Parent(s): Frederic Astley; Emma Screiber

Major Delaval Graham L'Estrange Astley, CB, DL (7 December 1868 – 17 May 1951) was a Major in the British Army. He has been claimed to have won a medals at the 1924 Winter Olympics for both the British and Swedish Curling teams. Despite being on the reserve British team, he made no appearances for either team during the Olympics and therefore was not eligible for a medal.

== Early life ==
Delaval Astley was born in Aylsham, Norfolk, on 7 December 1868 to Frederic Astley and Emma Schreiber.

He was commissioned a lieutenant in the Welch Regiment, and after he retired from the regular army was appointed a captain in the North Somerset Yeomanry on 11 July 1895. He later served as aide-de-camp to Colonel Boyle, Commander of the West Counties Brigade Volunteer Infantry.

== Sporting career ==
=== Curling ===
Curling made its first appearance at an Olympic Games at the 1924 Winter Olympics in Chamonix, France. Four teams took part, one from Great Britain, one from France and two teams from Sweden. Astley appeared on the reserve team for the British. It was claimed that Astley had played at some point for the British team thus becoming eligible, and also playing for Sweden in a playoff match with the French team. This would have meant that Astley won both a gold and silver medal for different countries in the same sport - the only time this would have occurred. However, Astley actually made no appearances during the 1924 Winter Olympics for any teams and was not eligible for medals of any type.
