= Johan Petter Åhlén =

Swedish curler and businessman (1879–1939)

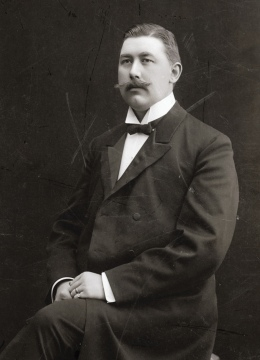
- Åhlén at the age of 25 (from the archive of Åhléns)
- Born: Johan Petter Andersson; 13 April 1879; Ål, Kopparberg County, Sweden
- Died: 31 March 1939 (aged 59); Atlantic Ocean
- Known for: Åhléns, Tempo, Åhlén & Åkerlund, Olympic curler

Notes
- Boxen mentions his Tempo stores.

Johan Petter Åhlén
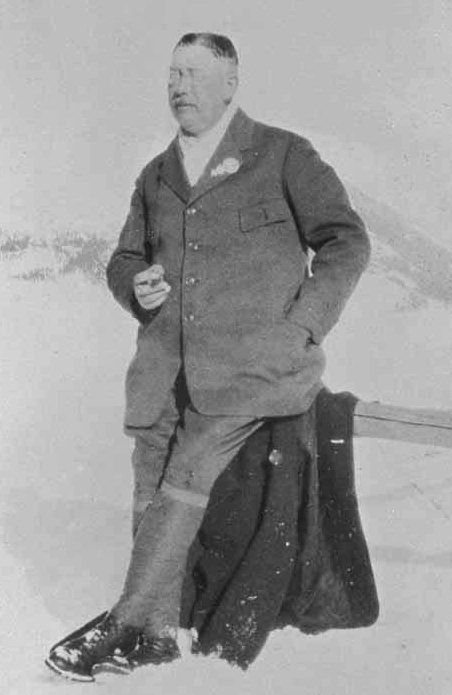
- Åhlén at the 1924 Olympics

Sport
- Sport: Curling
- Club: Åre Curlingklubb
Medal record
Representing Sweden
Olympic Games
Silver medal – second place	1924 Chamonix	Team

Johan Petter Åhlén (born Andersson; 13 April 1879 – 31 March 1939) was a Swedish businessperson who founded Åhléns. He was also a Swedish curling pioneer and winner of a silver medal in the 1924 Winter Olympics.

== Biography ==
Johan Petter Åhlén was the son of farmers Marits Anders Andersson and Brittas Karin Christoffersdotter. He was born Johan Petter Andersson, but changed his surname to Åhlén after his birthplace (which was called Åhl by the time of his name change) to avoid being confused with numerous namesakes. In 1903 he married Elin Maria Charlotta Brolin and had the sons Gösta Mauritz Åhlén and Anders Ragnar Åhlén, who both became managing directors of his companies. He also had two daughters, Gunvor and Hjördis. Åhlén died in 1939 while crossing the Atlantic Ocean on a boat trip from New York.

== Businessperson ==
In 1899, Johan Petter Åhlén founded the mail-order company Åhlén & Holm in his hometown, partnered with his uncle Erik Holm. It soon changed name to Insjön and became the leader in its field in Scandinavia. In 1902, Johan Petter Åhlén became the sole owner of the company. In 1906 he and Erik Åkerlund launched another company, the book publishing house Åhlén & Åkerlunds. In 1932, after a study tour to the US, he founded the first department store, at Östermalmstorg in Stockholm.

== Curling player ==
Johan Petter Åhlén was a Swedish curling pioneer, silver medalist at the 1924 Winter Olympics, three-time Swedish champion, and vice president of the Swedish Curling Association in 1935–38.
