= Erik Severin =

Swedish curler

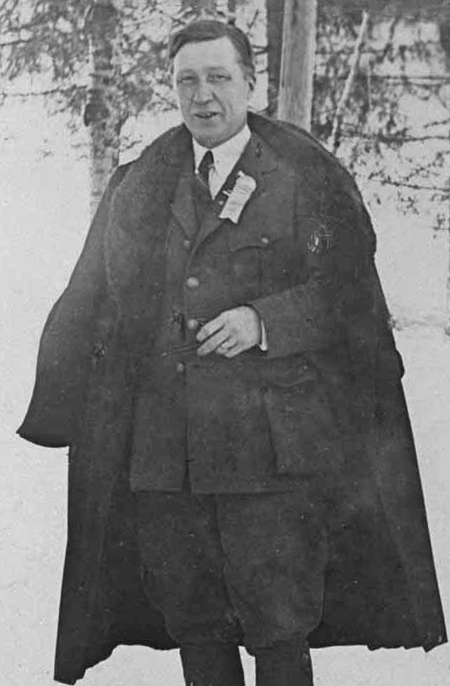
- Severin at the 1924 Olympics

Personal information
- Born: 18 July 1879 Stockholm, Sweden
- Died: 15 November 1942 (aged 63) Stockholm, Sweden

Sport
- Sport: Curling
- Club: Kronprinsens CK, Stockholm
Medal record
Representing Sweden
Olympic Games
Silver medal – second place	1924 Chamonix	Team

Erik Oskar Severin (18 July 1879 – 15 November 1942) was a Swedish curler who won a silver medal at the 1924 Winter Olympics in Chamonix. He was a banker by profession.
