= Victor Wetterström =

Personal information
- Born: 27 August 1884 Stockholm, Sweden
- Died: 11 May 1956 (aged 71) Stockholm, Sweden
- Height: 170 cm (5 ft 7 in)

Sport
- Sport: Curling
- Club: Amatörföreningens CK, Stockholm
Medal record
Representing Sweden
Olympic Games
Silver medal – second place	1924 Chamonix	Team

Victor Wetterström (27 August 1884 – 11 May 1956) was a Swedish curler who won a silver medal at the 1924 Winter Olympics in Chamonix. In 1944 he became the first recipient of the Medal of Merit of the Swedish Curling Association; he was also awarded the Polish Cross of Merit, the Austrian Red Cross Gold Medal and the Order of Vasa. Wetterström worked in the shoe trading business, and had four daughters with his wife Maria.
