= Karl Wahlberg =

Swedish curler (1874–1934)

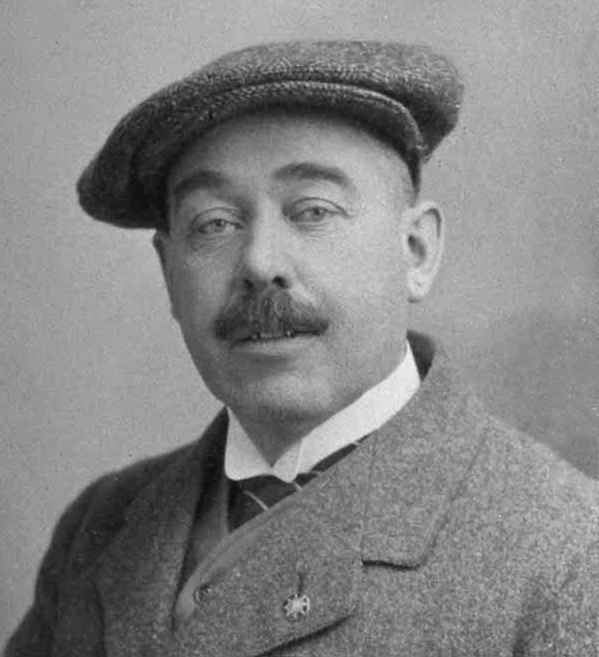
- Wahlberg at the 1924 Olympics

Personal information
- Born: 31 March 1874 Stockholm, Sweden
- Died: 1 August 1934 (aged 60) Stockholm, Sweden

Sport
- Sport: Curling
- Club: Stockholms Curlingklubb
Medal record
Representing Sweden
Olympic Games
Silver medal – second place	1924 Chamonix	Team

Karl Edvard Wahlberg (31 March 1874 – 1 August 1934) was a Swedish curler who won a silver medal at the 1924 Winter Olympics. He was a national champion in 1917 and 1934.
