= Carl August Kronlund =

Swedish curler and Olympic medalist

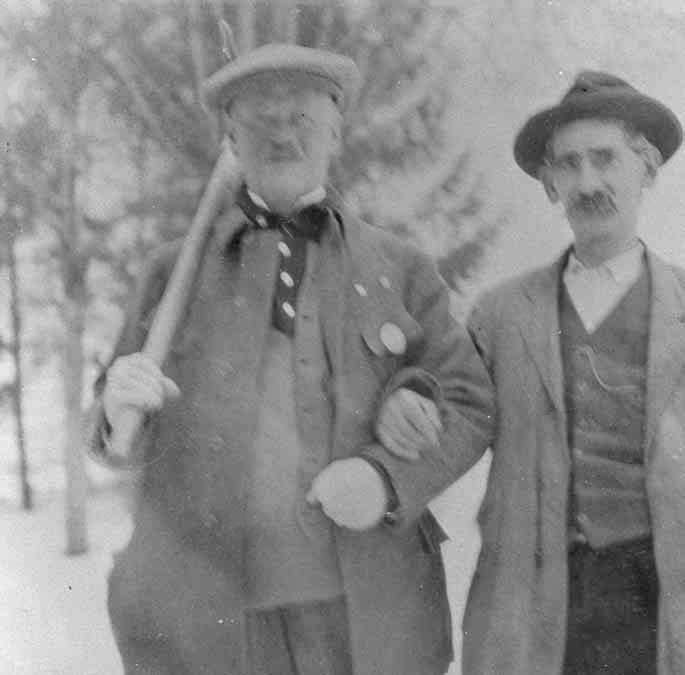
- Kronlund (left) at the 1924 Olympics

Personal information
- Born: 25 August 1865 Skövde, Västra Götaland County, Sweden–Norway
- Died: 15 August 1937 (aged 71) Stockholm, Stockholm County, Sweden

Sport
- Sport: Curling
- Club: Stockholms Curlingklubb
Medal record
Representing Sweden
Olympic Games
Silver medal – second place	1924 Chamonix	Team

Carl August Verner Kronlund (25 August 1865 – 15 August 1937) was a Swedish curler who won a silver medal at the 1924 Winter Olympics. Aged 58, he was the oldest competitor at those games and the oldest in the modern era of Winter Olympics. In the 1924 games, he played lead right-handed for the second Swedish team. He lived most of his life in Stockholm with his wife Elin, cleaning chimneys for work and dying of a stroke, aged 71.
