= Ture Ödlund =

Swedish curler (1894–1942)

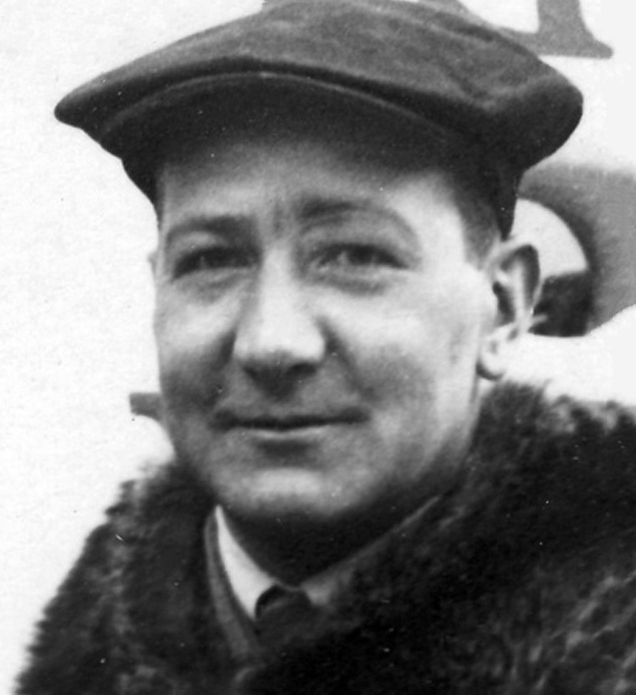

Personal information
- Born: 15 May 1894 Njurunda, Sweden
- Died: 15 August 1937 (aged 48) Stockholm, Sweden

Sport
- Sport: Curling
- Club: Kronprinsens CK, Stockholm
Medal record
Representing Sweden
Olympic Games
| Silver medal – second place | 1924 Chamonix | Team |

Ture Michael Ödlund (15 May 1894 – 14 December 1942) was a Swedish curler who won a silver medal at the 1924 Winter Olympics in Chamonix.
