= Carl Wilhelm Petersén =

Swedish curler and Olympic medalist (1884–1973)

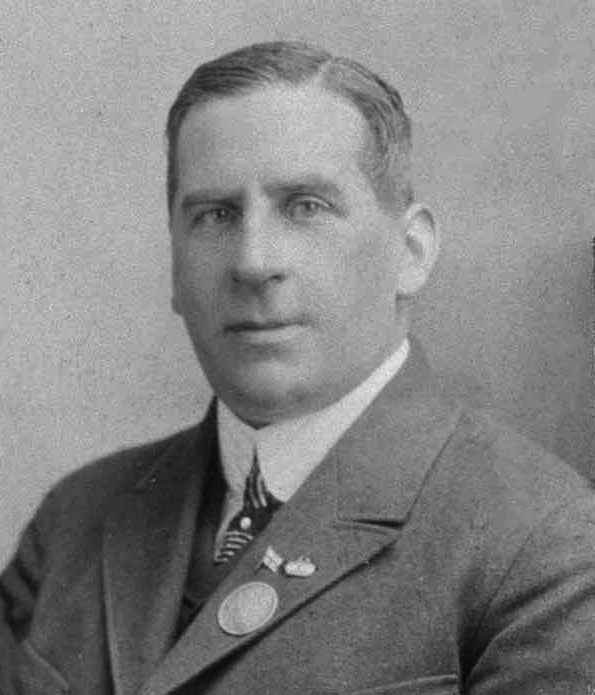
- Petersén at the 1924 Olympics

Personal information
- Born: 28 March 1884 Stockholm, Sweden
- Died: 3 October 1973 (aged 89) San Diego, California, United States
- Height: 152 cm (5 ft 0 in)

Sport
- Sport: Curling
- Club: Amatörföreningens CK, Stockholm
Medal record
Representing Sweden
Olympic Games
Silver medal – second place	1924 Chamonix	Team

Carl Wilhelm Malkus Petersén (28 March 1884 – 3 October 1973) was a Swedish curler who won a silver medal at the 1924 Winter Olympics. He later moved to the United States and died in San Diego, California.
