= Carl Axel Pettersson =

Swedish curler and Olympic medalist

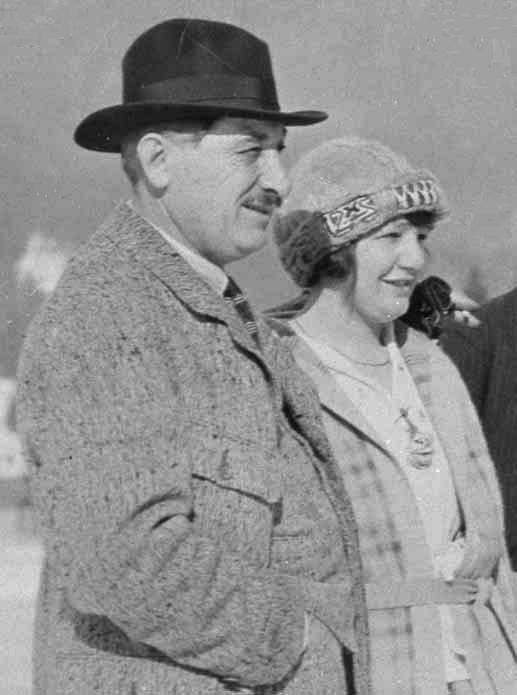
- Pettersson at the 1924 Olympics

Personal information
- Born: 13 April 1874 in Mönsterås, Kalmar, Sweden Mönsterås, Sweden
- Died: 31 May 1962 (aged 88) Stockholm, Sweden

Sport
- Sport: Curling
- Club: Åre Curlingklubb
Medal record
Representing Sweden
Olympic Games
| Silver medal – second place | 1924 Chamonix | Team |

Carl Axel Fredrik Pettersson (13 April 1874 – 31 May 1962) was a Swedish curler who won a silver medal at the 1924 Winter Olympics.

Pettersson was a manager of a clothing company and chairman of the Swedish association of the clothing industry. He was also Consul General for Hungary in Sweden and member of the Stockholm's Council of the 50 Elders. He was awarded the Order of the Polar Star, the Order of Vasa and the Royal Hungarian Order of Merit, among other decorations. He was married to Kerstin, who died 17 years before him; they had three children.
