= Ski jumping at the FIS Nordic World Ski Championships 1929 =

Ski jumping event at the FIS Nordic World Ski Championships 1929 in Zakopane

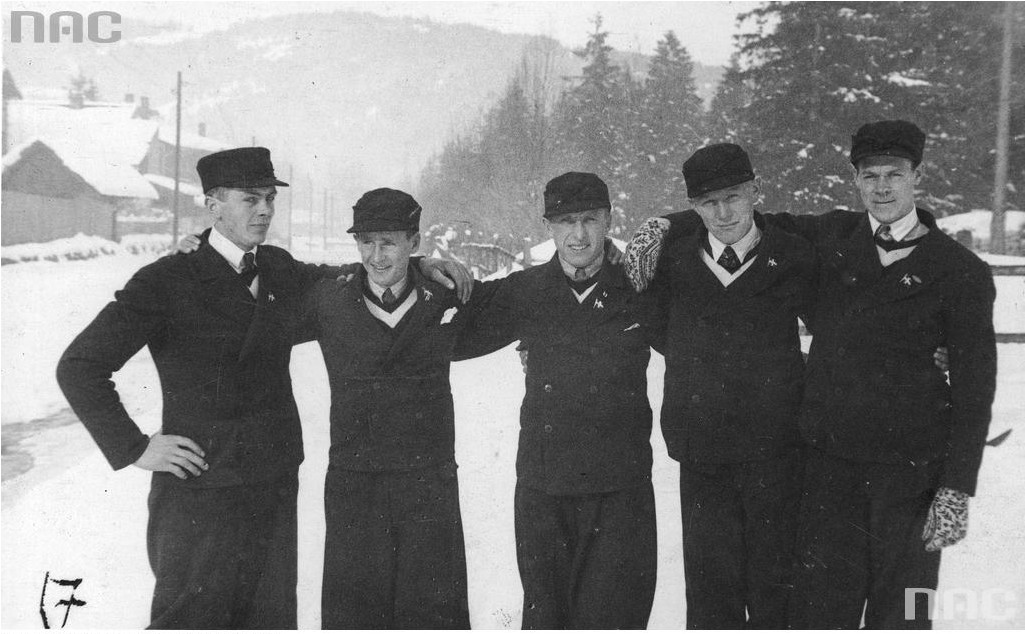
Norwegian athletes at the 1929 FIS Nordic World Ski Championships in Zakopane. From left: Arne Busterud, Kristian Johansson, Christian Holmen, Hans Kleppen, Hans Vinjarengen

Ski jumping at the FIS Nordic World Ski Championships 1929 was a ski jumping competition held as part of the FIS Nordic World Ski Championships 1929 on 10 February 1929 at Wielka Krokiew in Zakopane, Poland, to determine the fourth world champion in ski jumping.

A total of 57 athletes from 11 countries were registered for the competition, with 49 ultimately participating and 41 being classified. The top three places were secured by Norwegian athletes: Sigmund Ruud won gold, Kristian Johansson took silver, and Hans Kleppen earned bronze. Six of the top seven positions were occupied by Norwegians. The highest-placed non-Norwegian was Germany's Alois Kratzer, who finished fourth. The longest jump of the competition, 58.5 meters in the second round, was achieved by Hans Kleppen.

Formally, the event was considered the European Championships, but since the 1965 FIS Congress, its results have been recognized as those of the fourth FIS Nordic World Ski Championships. This was the first international championship-level ski jumping event held in Poland.

In an exhibition round held after the official competition, Sigmund Ruud achieved the longest jump ever recorded at Wielka Krokiew at the time, reaching 71.5 meters, though he fell. The longest valid jump, setting a new Polish national record, was 66 meters by Stanisław Gąsienica Sieczka.

== Event background ==
=== Ski jumping in the late 1920s ===
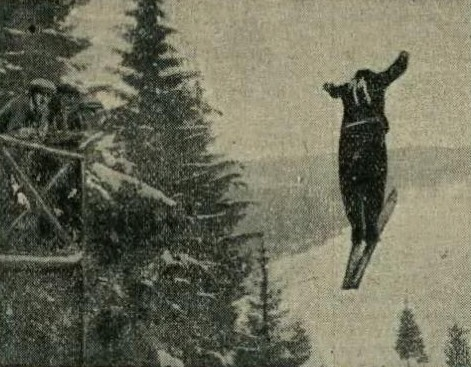
Ski jump by Zygmunt Rajski in 1929

The previous world championships were held in 1927 in Cortina d'Ampezzo, where Tore Edman won, followed by Wilhelm Dick and Bertil Carlsson in second and third. A year before the Zakopane event, the 1928 Winter Olympics took place in St. Moritz, with Alf Andersen winning gold, Sigmund Ruud taking silver, and Rudolf Burkert earning bronze. 38 athletes from 13 countries competed.

The world record for the longest ski jump at the time was held by Nels Nelsen, who jumped 73 meters in February 1925 at the Nels Nelsen Hill in Revelstoke. The European record, set by Bruno Trojani at Bernina-Roseg-Schanze in Pontresina, was 72 meters.

=== Event organization ===
Zakopane was awarded the right to host the championships during the 1928 FIS Congress in St. Moritz. Officially, the event was the European Ski Championships, including classical disciplines (cross-country skiing, ski jumping, and Nordic combined) and exhibition events like downhill skiing and a military patrol race (a precursor to biathlon). The downhill event laid the groundwork for future FIS Alpine World Ski Championships. Only European athletes were allowed to compete.

At that time, there was no event officially called the World Ski Championships, and only athletes from the European continent were allowed to compete in all disciplines. Such events officially began to be referred to as World Championships starting with the 1937 championships in Chamonix. Nevertheless, at its 1965 congress, the International Ski Federation recognized all editions from 1925 to 1935, including the championships in Zakopane, as official editions of the FIS Nordic World Ski Championships.

=== Ski jumping venue ===
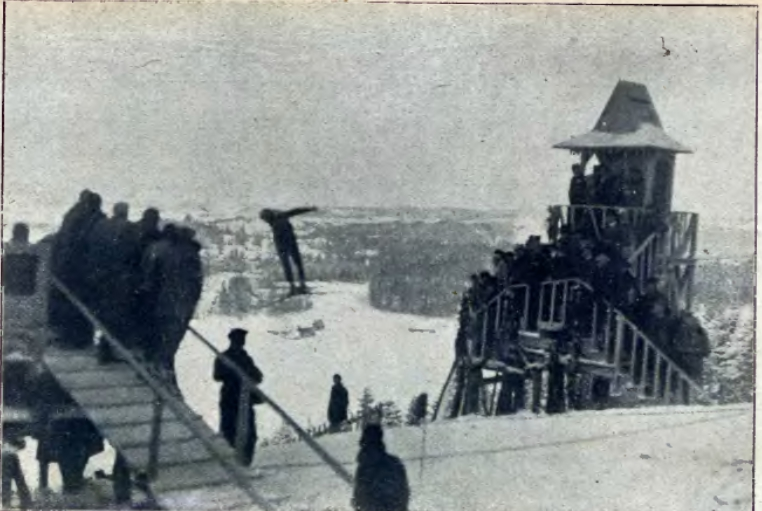
Wielka Krokiew during the 1929 championships in Zakopane

The ski jumping events, including those for Nordic combined, were held at Wielka Krokiew, constructed in 1925. For the championships, the venue underwent upgrades, including adjustments to the inrun and hill profile, and the construction of fan-shaped spectator stands, a VIP tribune, a military tribune, a press tribune, and a new judges' tower with a lodge.

Wielka Krokiew was a large hill with a construction point at 60 meters. The inrun was 94 meters long with a 30-degree incline, the landing slope was 114 meters long with a 38-degree incline, and the elevation difference was 91 meters. The venue record before the event, set by Bronisław Czech in 1928, was 61 meters.

=== Official delegation ===
The competition was attended by Poland's President Ignacy Mościcki. The official delegation included Ivar Holmquist, President of the International Ski Federation (FIS), Aleksander Bobkowski, President of the Polish Ski Association, and representatives from the national federations of England, Finland, Italy, Norway, Romania, Switzerland, and Czechoslovakia.

=== Spectator attendance ===
Approximately 10,000 spectators gathered at Wielka Krokiew to watch the ski jumping competition. Around 11:00 AM, an hour before the event, crowds moved toward the venue from the Market Square, Wilcznik, and along Piłsudski and Zamoyski streets. Many fans came from Kraków and Silesia.

== Competition overview ==
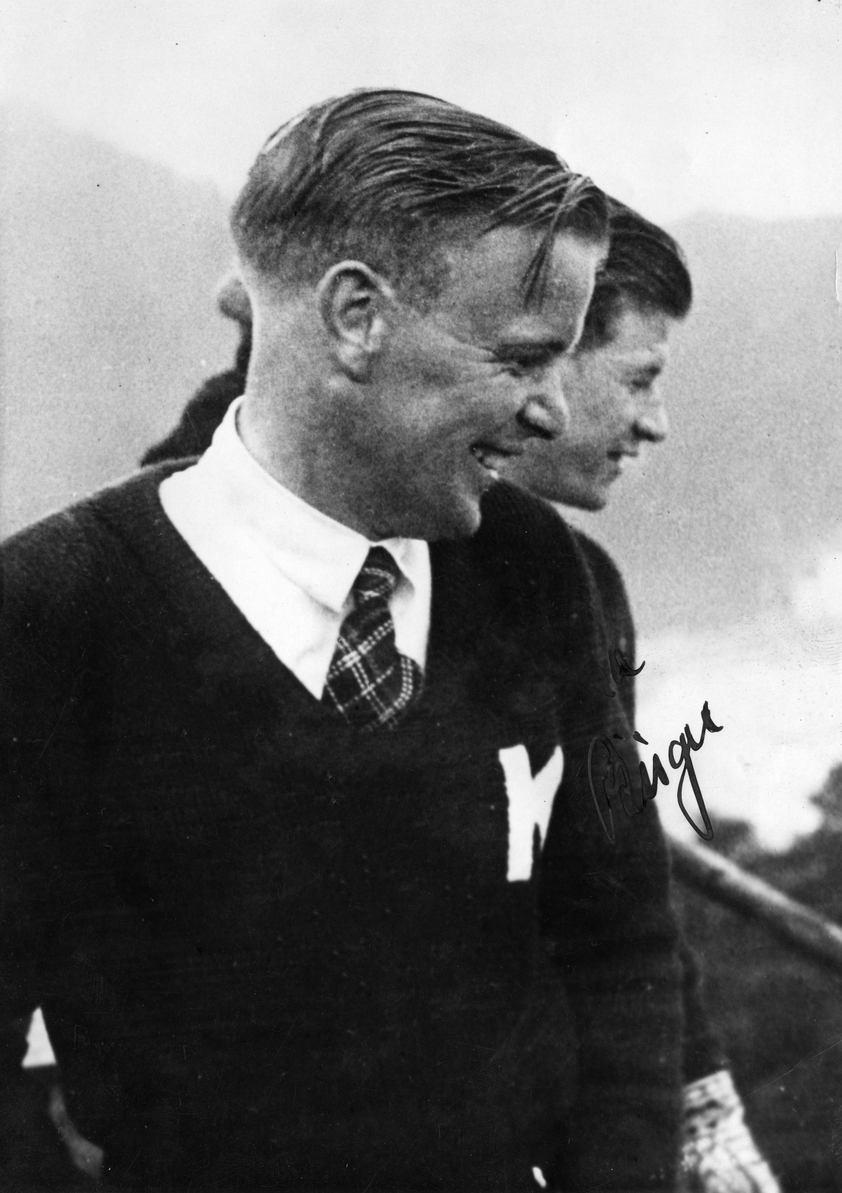
Sigmund Ruud, gold medalist in ski jumping at the 1929 Zakopane championships (photo from 1934)

=== Weather conditions ===
In February 1929, Poland experienced record-low temperatures. The night before the competition, temperatures in Zakopane dropped to near -40°C with heavy snowfall. On the competition day, the temperature was -25°C at noon, but the weather was sunny.

=== Registered athletes ===
57 athletes from 11 countries – Austria, Czechoslovakia, Finland, Norway, Poland, Germany, Switzerland, Sweden, Hungary, United Kingdom, and Italy – were registered. Czechoslovakia had the largest team with 18 athletes, competing under two federations: the Czechoslovak Ski Association (SL RČS) and the German Winter Sports Association (HDW). Poland entered 14 athletes, Norway nine, Germany and Switzerland four each, Sweden two, and the remaining countries one each.

The starting order was determined by a draw on 9 February 1929. Ultimately, 49 athletes competed, with 41 classified. Eight registered athletes – five Czechoslovaks (Franz Banyasz, Franz Bujak, Albert Ettrich, Meergans, Paul Novak) and three Poles (Józef Lankosz, Antoni Szostak, Tadeusz Zaydel) – did not start.

=== Competition progression ===
The competition began at 12:00 PM. Each athlete's name, surname, and country were announced via megaphone before their jump. Two white boards displayed the start number (in red) and jump distance (in blue). The event was judged by a three-person panel: Nikolai Ramm Østgaard (Norway), Władysław Ziętkiewicz (Poland), and Karel Jarolímek (Czechoslovakia).

The first jumper, Peder Belgum, landed at 40.5 meters. The next, Fritz Kaufmann, jumped 50.5 meters, one of 15 athletes reaching at least 50 meters in the first round. The longest jump of the first round, 57 meters, was by Sigmund Ruud. Kristian Johansson and Tore Edman jumped 56 meters, though Edman fell. Other notable first-round jumps included Hans Vinjarengen (55 m), Hans Kleppen (54 m), Alois Kratzer, Arne Busterud, and Franciszek Cukier (53 m each), Christian Holmen (52 m), Wolfgang Glaser (51.5 m), and Bruno Trojani (51 m). The round ended with Ole Stenen at 45 meters. Ten falls were recorded. Three athletes who fell – Walter Hain, Josef Německý, and Guy Nixon – did not compete in the second round.

In the second round, 20 athletes jumped at least 50 meters, five more than in the first. The longest jump, 58.5 meters, was by Hans Kleppen. Tore Edman jumped 57 meters but fell again. Other notable jumps included Hans Vinjarengen (56.5 m), Kristian Johansson and Alois Kratzer (56 m each), Christian Holmen (55.5 m), and Sigmund Ruud and Arne Busterud (55 m each). Athletes improving to 50+ meters included Paavo Nuotio and Ole Stenen (53 m each), Gérard Vuilleumier (52 m), Sven Eriksson (51.5 m), and Rudolf Burkert (50 m).

The judging panel declared Sigmund Ruud the winner with 227.2 points, beating Kristian Johansson (225.2 points) by 2 points and Hans Kleppen (223.8 points) by 3.4 points.

In the overall tally, the Norwegians performed the best among all national teams, earning 120 points in the ski jumping competition for the team ranking, finishing 27 points ahead of the second-place Germans. They achieved this despite most of their team struggling with colds. The Norwegians secured six of the top seven positions in the event, meeting the expectations placed on them by Norwegian fans. These fans, disappointed with the results of their athletes in the cross-country skiing events – the weakest performances by the Norwegians since the start of FIS competitions – were hoping for a better showing from the jumpers, especially since they had not participated in the previous championships in Cortina d'Ampezzo. In the Zakopane competition, the weakest of the nine Norwegian competitors who started was ranked 22nd.

=== Competition results ===
| Rank | Start number | Athlete | Country | Jump 1 (m) | Jump 2 (m) | Points |
|---|---|---|---|---|---|---|
| 1. | 30 | Sigmund Ruud | Norway | 57.0 | 55.0 | 227.2 |
| 2. | 22 | Kristian Johansson | Norway | 56.0 | 56.0 | 225.2 |
| 3. | 45 | Hans Kleppen | Norway | 54.0 | 58.5 | 223.8 |
| 4. | 31 | Alois Kratzer | Germany | 53.0 | 56.0 | 220.0 |
| 4. | 20 | Hans Vinjarengen | Norway | 55.0 | 56.5 | 220.0 |
| 6. | 16 | Arne Busterud | Norway | 53.0 | 55.0 | 218.1 |
| 7. | 39 | Christian Holmen | Norway | 52.0 | 55.5 | 215.3 |
| 8. | 56 | Paavo Nuotio | Finland | 48.0 | 53.0 | 210.3 |
| 9. | 9 | Erich Recknagel | Germany | 50.0 | 53.5 | 209.2 |
| 10. | 38 | Bronisław Czech | Poland | 50.0 | 53.5 | 208.7 |
| 11. | 8 | Rudolf Burkert | Czechoslovakia (HDW) | 48.0 | 50.0 | 208.1 |
| 12. | 19 | Bruno Trojani | Switzerland | 51.0 | 51.5 | 207.8 |
| 13. | 10 | Sven Eriksson | Sweden | 47.0 | 51.5 | 207.7 |
| 14. | 2 | Fritz Kaufmann | Switzerland | 50.5 | 53.0 | 206.7 |
| 15. | 24 | Wolfgang Glaser | Czechoslovakia (HDW) | 51.5 | 53.0 | 205.1 |
| 16. | 14 | Gérard Vuilleumier | Switzerland | 49.5 | 52.0 | 203.1 |
| 17. | 48 | Franciszek Cukier | Poland | 53.0 | 51.5 | 202.1 |
| 18. | 37 | Leif Skagnæs | Norway | 50.0 | 54.5 | 200.1 |
| 19. | 57 | Ole Stenen | Norway | 45.0 | 53.0 | 199.6 |
| 20. | 12 | Franz Thannheimer | Germany | 48.0 | 48.5 | 196.4 |
| 21. | 36 | Stephan Lauener | Switzerland | 48.0 | 48.5 | 191.4 |
| 22. | 1 | Peder Belgum | Norway | 40.5 | 47.5 | 190.1 |
| 23. | 51 | Władysław Mietelski | Poland | 42.0 | 49.0 | 185.3 |
| 24. | 23 | Vitale Venzi | Italy | 47.5 | 45.5 | 185.1 |
| 25. | 27 | Karol Gąsienica Szostak | Poland | 47.5 | 46.0 | 183.2 |
| 26. | 44 | Vítězslav Pech | Czechoslovakia (SL RČS) | 43.0 | 47.0 | 181.4 |
| 27. | 41 | Andrzej Krzeptowski I | Poland | 42.0 | 41.0 | 177.6 |
| 28. | 5 | Gustl Müller | Germany | 42.0 | 49.0 | 175.8 |
| 29. | 6 | Zygmunt Rajski | Poland | 43.0 | 42.0 | 171.9 |
| 30. | 46 | Piotr Kolesar | Poland | 39.0 | 41.0 | 170.4 |
| 30. | 55 | Béla Szepes | Hungary | 41.0 | 44.0 | 170.4 |
| 32. | 53 | K. Aichinger | Czechoslovakia (HDW) | 40.0 | 41.0 | 166.8 |
| 33. | 4 | Bohuslav Kadavý | Czechoslovakia (SL RČS) | 37.0 | 39.0 | 162.8 |
| 34. | 35 | Władysław Żytkowicz | Poland | 39.0 | 38.0 | 150.7 |
| 35. | 21 | Esko Järvinen | Finland | 46.0 | 48.0 (u) | 133.1 |
| 36. | 50 | Alexander Civrný | Czechoslovakia (SL RČS) | 45.0 | 48.0 | 130.7 |
| 37. | 49 | Stanisław Gąsienica Sieczka | Poland | 49.0 | 45.5 (u) | 122.8 |
| 37. | 26 | Aleksander Rozmus | Poland | 48.0 (u) | 49.0 | 122.8 |
| 39. | 7 | Adolf Hnyk | Czechoslovakia (SL RČS) | 39.0 | 43.0 (u) | 113.8 |
| 40. | 29 | Franciszek Graca | Poland | 37.0 (u) | 37.0 (u) | 95.5 |
| 41. | 28 | Erwin Priebsch | Czechoslovakia (HDW) | 47.5 (u) | 28.0 | 87.1 |
| – | 3 | Walter Hain | Czechoslovakia (HDW) | 41.0 (u) | DNS | – |
| – | 11 | F. Kolářík | Czechoslovakia (SL RČS) | 44.0 (u) | 42.0 (u) | – |
| – | 13 | Karl Wondrak | Czechoslovakia (SL RČS) | 47.0 (u) | 46.5 (u) | – |
| – | 18 | Guy Nixon | Great Britain | 36.0 (u) | DNS | – |
| – | 33 | Tore Edman | Sweden | 56.0 (u) | 57.0 (u) | – |
| – | 42 | Josef Německý | Czechoslovakia (SL RČS) | 40.0 (u) | DNS | – |
| – | 47 | Kutcera | Austria | 48.0 (u) | 49.0 (u) | – |
| – | 52 | Rudolf Vrána | Czechoslovakia (SL RČS) | 48.0 (u) | 46.5 (u) | – |
| – | 15 | Józef Lankosz | Poland | DNS | DNS | – |
| – | 17 | Franz Bujak | Czechoslovakia (HDW) | DNS | DNS | – |
| – | 25 | Meergans | Czechoslovakia (HDW) | DNS | DNS | – |
| – | 32 | Tadeusz Zaydel | Poland | DNS | DNS | – |
| – | 34 | Paul Novak | Czechoslovakia (HDW) | DNS | DNS | – |
| – | 40 | Antoni Szostak | Poland | DNS | DNS | – |
| – | 43 | Albert Ettrich | Czechoslovakia (HDW) | DNS | DNS | – |
| – | 54 | Franz Banyasz | Czechoslovakia (HDW) | DNS | DNS | – |

== Post-competition developments ==
=== Polish championships ===
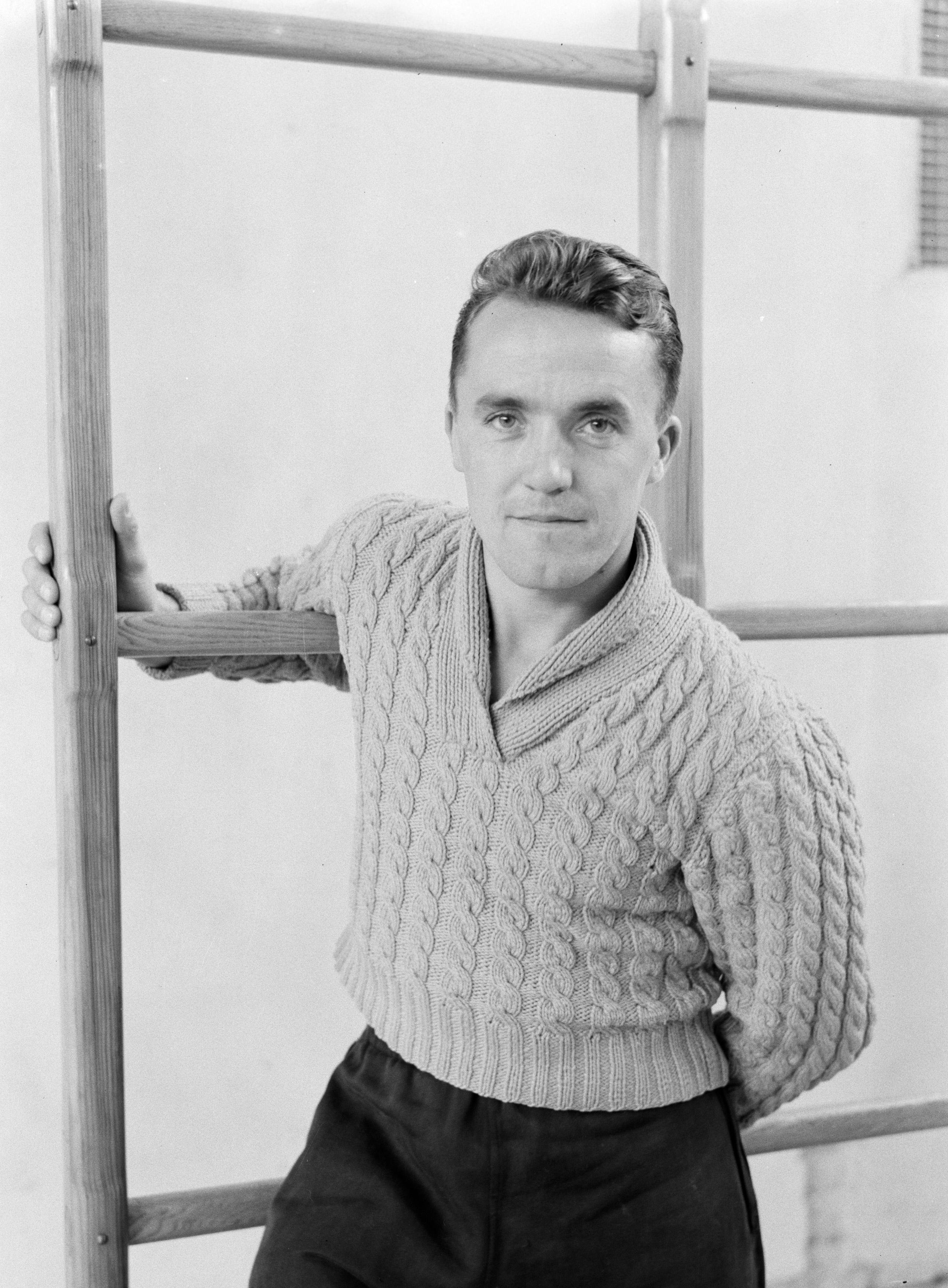
Bronisław Czech, Polish champion and 10th in the world championships (photo from 1934)

The Zakopane competition doubled as the international Polish Ski Jumping Championships. Sigmund Ruud was declared the international champion. However, official Polish championship standings excluded foreign athletes. Bronisław Czech, 10th overall, was named Polish champion, followed by Franciszek Cukier (17th) and Władysław Mietelski (23rd).

=== Venue record attempts ===
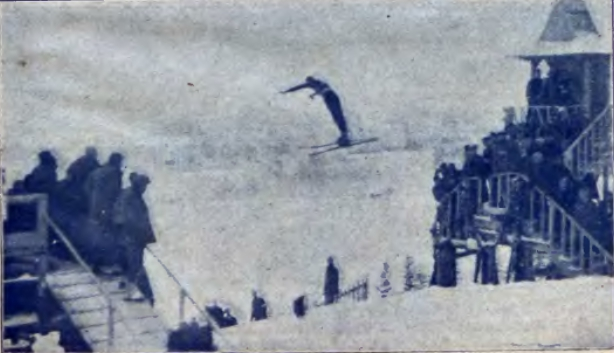
Sigmund Ruud during his non-landed 71.5-meter jump

After the competition, eight athletes participated in an exhibition round to attempt to break the venue record. The inrun was extended from 80 meters to the full 94 meters.

Sigmund Ruud jumped 71.5 meters, the longest ever at Wielka Krokiew, but fell, so the jump was not officially recognized. Stanisław Gąsienica Sieczka set a new Polish national record with a valid 66-meter jump. Although the athlete, like Ruud, fell after landing, the landing itself was deemed correct, and thus the record was officially recognized. Distances exceeding the previous hill record were also achieved by Bronisław Czech and Franciszek Cukier, both of whom jumped 63 meters.

| Athlete | Country | Distance |
|---|---|---|
| Józef Lankosz | Poland | 53.0 |
| Vitale Venzi | Italy | 57.0 |
| Aleksander Rozmus | Poland | 59.0 |
| Bronisław Czech | Poland | 63.0 |
| Sigmund Ruud | Norway | 71.5 (u) |
| Franciszek Cukier | Poland | 63.0 |
| Stanisław Gąsienica Sieczka | Poland | 66.0 |
| Franciszek Graca | Poland | 46.0 |

=== Medal ceremony ===
The top three athletes received trophies: gold for the winner, silver for second, and bronze for third. The trophies were engraved with "FIS COMPETITION – Zakopane – February 1929" on the front and "Award of the City of Zakopane – jumping" on the back.

The awards ceremony took place on the evening of the competition at 9:00 PM in the Red Cross Sanatorium in Zakopane, followed by a banquet at 11:00 PM. FIS President Ivar Holmquist presented the awards for all championship events, and national anthems of the winners' countries were played.

=== Media reception ===
Before the event, Polish media expressed doubts about Zakopane's ability to host such a major competition, citing Poland's lack of experience and the lower skill level of Polish athletes compared to foreign competitors. Contrary to earlier concerns, the preparation and execution of the World Championships in Zakopane were highly praised by athletes, officials, as well as Polish and foreign journalists. The Polish press reported that the city authorities and the ski association met the organizational expectations placed upon them. It was also noted that the event was better organized than the competitions of the 1928 Winter Olympics held in St. Moritz, a view echoed by foreign competitors. The German magazine Der Winter described Wielka Krokiew as the finest ski jumping venue in Central Europe, comparing it to Fiskartorpet in Stockholm and Holmenkollbakken in Oslo.

FIS President Ivar Holmquist praised the Tatra scenery, Polish hospitality, and the impressive size and location of Wielka Krokiew near the city center.
