= Czechoslovakia at the 1928 Winter Olympics =

- IOC code: TCH
- NOC: Czechoslovak Olympic Committee

in St. Moritz
- Competitors: 29 in 6 sports
- Medals Ranked 8th: Gold 0 Silver 0 Bronze 1 Total 1

Winter Olympics appearances (overview)
- 1924; 1928; 1932; 1936; 1948; 1952; 1956; 1960; 1964; 1968; 1972; 1976; 1980; 1984; 1988; 1992

Other related appearances
- Czech Republic (1994–pres.); Slovakia (1994–pres.)

Czechoslovakia competed at the 1928 Winter Olympics in St. Moritz, Switzerland. Rudolf Burkert won the first Czechoslovak medal from the Winter Olympics. Libuše Veselá was the first Czechoslovak woman to take part in the Winter Olympics.

== Medalists ==
Medal	Name	Sport	Event	Date
Bronze	Rudolf Burkert	Ski jumping	Men's individual	18 February

== Cross-country skiing ==
Athlete	Event	Race	
Time	Rank		
Franz Donth	18 km	1:47:14	11
Franz Donth	50 km	5:37:36	14
Otakar Německý	18 km	1:50:20	16
Vladimír Novák	18 km	1:47:53	12
Josef Feistauer	50 km	Did not finish	
Václav Fišera	50 km	5:42:55	18
Josef Německý	50 km	5:35:46	11

== Figure skating ==
Athlete(s)	Event	CF	FS	TO	Points	Rank
Josef Slíva	Men's	5	6	36	2442.00	5
Libuše Veselá & Vojtěch Veselý	Pairs	—N/a		102	60.00	12

== Ice hockey ==
7	Czechoslovakia
	Wolfgang Dorasil; Karel Hromádka; Jan Krásl; Erwin Lichnofsky (Johann Lichnowski); Josef Maleček; Jan Peka; Jaroslav Pušbauer; Jaroslav Řezáč; Josef Šroubek; Miroslav Steigenhöfer; Jiří Tožička

The top team (highlighted) advanced to the medal round.

Team	GP	W	T	L	GF	GA
Sweden	2	1	1	0	5	2
Czechoslovakia	2	1	0	1	3	5
Poland	2	0	1	1	4	5

February 11	Sweden	3:0 (1:0,1:0,1:0)	Czechoslovakia
February 12	Sweden	2:2 (1:0,1:2,0:0)	Poland
February 13	Czechoslovakia	3:2 (1:1,1:1,1:0)	Poland

== Nordic combined ==
Athlete	Event	Cross-country			Ski jumping		Total	
Athlete	Event	Time	Rank	Points	Points	Rank	Points	Rank
Walter Buchberger	Individual	2:02:36	7.250	19	14.562	14	10.906	18
Rudolf Burkert	Individual	2:04:24	6.375	21	18.833	1	12.604	12
Otakar Německý	Individual	1:50:20	13.375	8	12.616	20	12.990	9
Franz Wende	Individual	2:00:50	8.125	16	Did not finish			

== Ski jumping ==
Athlete	Event	Jump 1		Jump 2		Total	
Athlete	Event	Distance	Rank	Distance	Rank	Points	Rank
Josef Bím	Normal hill	49.5	19	51.0	31	14.728	20
Rudolf Burkert	Normal hill	57.0	4	59.5	12	17.937	3rd place, bronze medalist(s)
Willy Möhwald	Normal hill	46.0	30	59.0	16	15.500	15
Karl Wondrak	Normal hill	48.5	23	49.0	33	14.478	21

== Military patrol (demonstration event) ==
Team Race

- Czechoslovakia - 4:15:07 (6th place)
  - Otakar Německý
  - Jan Bedřich
  - Josef Klouček
  - Robert Möhwald
