= List of FIS Nordic World Ski Championships medalists in ski jumping =

This is a list of medalists from the FIS Nordic World Ski Championships in ski jumping. Numbers in brackets denotes number of victories in corresponding disciplines. Boldface denotes record number of victories.

The Winter Olympics from 1924 to 1980 were also the Nordic World Ski Championships. This meant that the Olympic champions were also World champions and received an additional medal from the International Ski Federation (FIS). This list does not take into account the Olympic champions from 1924 to 1980.

== Men ==
=== Large hill individual ===
Debuted: 1925. Unofficial event: 1941.

Edition	Place	Date	Hill	Gold	Silver	Bronze
1925	(Czechoslovakia) Johannisbad	12 February	K45	(Czechoslovakia) Willen Dick	(Norway) Henry Ljungmann	(Czechoslovakia) František Wende
1926	(Finland) Lahti	4 February	K40	(Norway) Jacob Tullin Thams	(Norway) Otto Aasen	(Norway) Georg Østerholt
1927	(Italy) Cortina d'Ampezzo	2 February	K50	(Sweden) Tore Edman	(Czechoslovakia) Willen Dick	(Sweden) Bertil Carlsson
1929	(Poland) Zakopane	5 February	K60	(Norway) Sigmund Ruud	(Norway) Kristian Johansson	(Norway) Hans Kleppen
1930	(Norway) Oslo	27 February	K50	(Norway) Gunnar Andersen	(Norway) Reidar Andersen	(Norway) Sigmund Ruud
1931	(Germany) Oberhof	13 February	K55	(Norway) Birger Ruud	(Switzerland) Fritz Kaufmann	(Sweden) Sven Eriksson
1933	(Austria) Innsbruck	8 February	K70	(Switzerland) Marcel Reymond	(Czechoslovakia) Rudolf Burkert	(Sweden) Sven Eriksson
1934	(Sweden) Sollefteå	20 February	K60	(Norway) Kristian Johansson	(Norway) Arne Hovde	(Sweden) Sven Eriksson
1935	(Czechoslovakia) Vysoké Tatry	13 February	K55	(Norway) Birger Ruud	(Norway) Reidar Andersen	(Norway) Alf Andersen
1937	(France) Chamonix	12 February	K60	(Norway) Birger Ruud **(3)**	(Norway) Reidar Andersen	(Norway) Sigurd Solid
1938	(Finland) Lahti	27 February	K65	(Norway) Asbjørn Ruud	(Poland) Stanisław Marusarz	(Norway) Hilmar Myhra
1939	(Poland) Zakopane	11 February	K75	(Nazi Germany) Sepp Bradl	(Norway) Birger Ruud	(Norway) Arnholdt Kongsgaard
1950	(United States) Lake Placid	1 February	K80	(Norway) Hans Bjørnstad	(Sweden) Thure Lindgren	(Norway) Arnfinn Bergmann
1954	(Sweden) Falun	15 February	K80	(Finland) Matti Pietikäinen	(Finland) Veikko Heinonen	(Sweden) Bror Östman
1958	(Finland) Lahti	1 March	K70	(Finland) Juhani Kärkinen	(Finland) Ensio Hyytiä	(East Germany) Helmut Recknagel
1962	(Poland) Zakopane	25 February	K90	(East Germany) Helmut Recknagel	(Soviet Union) Nikolay Kamenskiy	(Finland) Niilo Halonen
1966	(Norway) Oslo	17 February	K85	(Norway) Bjørn Wirkola	(Japan) Takashi Fujisawa	(Sweden) Kjell Sjöberg
1970	(Czechoslovakia) Vysoké Tatry	21 February	K100	(Soviet Union) Gariy Napalkov	(Czechoslovakia) Jiří Raška	(Poland) Stanisław Gąsienica
1974	(Sweden) Falun	23 February	K100	(East Germany) Hans-Georg Aschenbach	(East Germany) Heinz Wossipiwo	(Czechoslovakia) Rudolf Höhnl
1978	(Finland) Lahti	25 February	K110	(Finland) Tapio Räisänen	(Austria) Alois Lipburger	(East Germany) Falko Weißpflog
1982	(Norway) Oslo	28 February	K105	(Finland) Matti Nykänen	(Norway) Olav Hansson	(Austria) Armin Kogler
1985	(Austria) Seefeld	20 January	K109	(Norway) Per Bergerud	(Finland) Jari Puikkonen	(Finland) Matti Nykänen
1987	(West Germany) Oberstdorf	15 February	K115	(Austria) Andreas Felder	(Norway) Vegard Opaas	(Austria) Ernst Vettori
1989	(Finland) Lahti	20 February	K114	(Finland) Jari Puikkonen	(East Germany) Jens Weißflog	(Finland) Matti Nykänen
1991	(Italy) Val di Fiemme	10 February	K115	(Socialist Federal Republic of Yugoslavia) Franci Petek	(Norway) Rune Olijnyk	(Germany) Jens Weißflog
1993	(Sweden) Falun	21 February	K115	(Norway) Espen Bredesen	(Czech Republic) Jaroslav Sakala	(Austria) Andreas Goldberger
1995	(Canada) Thunder Bay	18 March	K120	(Norway) Tommy Ingebrigtsen	(Austria) Andreas Goldberger	(Germany) Jens Weißflog
1997	(Norway) Trondheim	1 March	K120	(Japan) Masahiko Harada	(Germany) Dieter Thoma	(Switzerland) Sylvain Freiholz
1999	(Austria) Ramsau	21 February	K120	(Germany) Martin Schmitt	(Germany) Sven Hannawald	(Japan) Hideharu Miyahira
2001	(Finland) Lahti	19 February	K116	(Germany) Martin Schmitt (2)	(Poland) Adam Małysz	(Finland) Janne Ahonen
2003	(Italy) Val di Fiemme	22 February	K120	(Poland) Adam Małysz	(Finland) Matti Hautamäki	(Japan) Noriaki Kasai
2005	(Germany) Oberstdorf	25 February	HS137	(Finland) Janne Ahonen	(Norway) Roar Ljøkelsøy	(Czech Republic) Jakub Janda
2007	(Japan) Sapporo	24 February	HS134	(Switzerland) Simon Ammann	(Finland) Harri Olli	(Norway) Roar Ljøkelsøy
2009	(Czech Republic) Liberec	27 February	HS134	(Switzerland) Andreas Küttel	(Germany) Martin Schmitt	(Norway) Anders Jacobsen
2011	(Norway) Oslo	3 March	HS134	(Austria) Gregor Schlierenzauer	(Austria) Thomas Morgenstern	(Switzerland) Simon Ammann
2013	(Italy) Val di Fiemme	27 February	HS134	(Poland) Kamil Stoch	(Slovenia) Peter Prevc	(Norway) Anders Jacobsen
2015	(Sweden) Falun	26 February	HS134	(Germany) Severin Freund	(Austria) Gregor Schlierenzauer	(Norway) Rune Velta
2017	(Finland) Lahti	2 March	HS130	(Austria) Stefan Kraft	(Germany) Andreas Wellinger	(Poland) Piotr Żyła
2019	(Austria) Seefeld	23 February	HS130	(Germany) Markus Eisenbichler	(Germany) Karl Geiger	(Switzerland) Killian Peier
2021	(Germany) Oberstdorf	5 March	HS137	(Austria) Stefan Kraft (2)	(Norway) Robert Johansson	(Germany) Karl Geiger
2023	(Slovenia) Planica	3 March	HS138	(Slovenia) Timi Zajc	(Japan) Ryōyū Kobayashi	(Poland) Dawid Kubacki
2025	(Norway) Trondheim	8 March	HS138	(Slovenia) Domen Prevc	(Austria) Jan Hörl	(Japan) Ryōyū Kobayashi

The individual large hill is one of only three events that has been contested at every FIS Nordic World Ski Championships.

Medal table

Rank	Nation	Gold	Silver	Bronze	Total
1	Norway	13	13	12	38
2	Finland	6	5	4	15
3	Germany	5	5	3	13
4	Austria	4	5	3	12
5	Switzerland	3	1	3	7
6	Poland	2	2	3	7
7	East Germany	2	2	2	6
8	Slovenia	2	1	0	3
9	Czechoslovakia	1	3	2	6
10	Japan	1	2	3	6
11	Sweden	1	1	6	8
12	Soviet Union	1	1	0	2
13	Yugoslavia	1	0	0	1
14	Czech Republic	0	1	1	2
Totals (14 entries)		**42**	**42**	**42**	**126**

=== Normal hill individual ===
Debuted: 1962.

Edition	Place	Date	Hill	Gold	Silver	Bronze
1962	(Poland) Zakopane	21 February	K65	(Norway) Toralf Engan	(Poland) Antoni Łaciak	(East Germany) Helmut Recknagel
1966	(Norway) Oslo	23 February	K75	(Norway) Bjørn Wirkola	(East Germany) Dieter Neuendorf	(Finland) Paavo Lukkariniemi
1970	(Czechoslovakia) Vysoké Tatry	14 February	K80	(Soviet Union) Gariy Napalkov	(Japan) Yukio Kasaya	(Norway) Lars Grini
1974	(Sweden) Falun	16 February	K85	(East Germany) Hans-Georg Aschenbach	(East Germany) Dietrich Kampf	(Soviet Union) Aleksey Borovitin
1978	(Finland) Lahti	18 February	K85	(East Germany) Matthias Buse	(East Germany) Henry Glaß	(Soviet Union) Aleksey Borovitin
1982	(Norway) Oslo	21 February	K85	(Austria) Armin Kogler	(Finland) Jari Puikkonen	(Norway) Ole Bremseth
1985	(Austria) Seefeld	26 January	K90	(East Germany) Jens Weißflog	(Austria) Andreas Felder	(Norway) Per Bergerud
1987	(West Germany) Oberstdorf	20 February	K90	(Czechoslovakia) Jiří Parma	(Finland) Matti Nykänen	(Norway) Vegard Opaas
1989	(Finland) Lahti	26 February	K90	(East Germany) Jens Weißflog (2)	(Finland) Ari-Pekka Nikkola	(Austria) Heinz Kuttin
1991	(Italy) Val di Fiemme	16 February	K90	(Austria) Heinz Kuttin	(Norway) Kent Johanssen	(Finland) Ari-Pekka Nikkola
1993	(Sweden) Falun	27 February	K90	(Japan) Masahiko Harada	(Austria) Andreas Goldberger	(Czech Republic) Jaroslav Sakala
1995	(Canada) Thunder Bay	12 March	K90	(Japan) Takanobu Okabe	(Japan) Hiroya Saitō	(Finland) Mika Laitinen
1997	(Norway) Trondheim	22 February	K90	(Finland) Janne Ahonen	(Japan) Masahiko Harada	(Austria) Andreas Goldberger
1999	(Austria) Ramsau	26 February	K90	(Japan) Kazuyoshi Funaki	(Japan) Hideharu Miyahira	(Japan) Masahiko Harada
2001	(Finland) Lahti	23 February	K90	(Poland) Adam Małysz	(Germany) Martin Schmitt	(Austria) Martin Höllwarth
2003	(Italy) Val di Fiemme	28 February	K95	(Poland) Adam Małysz	(Norway) Tommy Ingebrigtsen	(Japan) Noriaki Kasai
2005	(Germany) Oberstdorf	19 February	HS100	(Slovenia) Rok Benkovič	(Czech Republic) Jakub Janda	(Finland) Janne Ahonen
2007	(Japan) Sapporo	3 March	HS100	(Poland) Adam Małysz **(3)**	(Switzerland) Simon Ammann	(Austria) Thomas Morgenstern
2009	(Czech Republic) Liberec	21 February	HS100	(Austria) Wolfgang Loitzl	(Austria) Gregor Schlierenzauer	(Switzerland) Simon Ammann
2011	(Norway) Oslo	26 February	HS106	(Austria) Thomas Morgenstern	(Austria) Andreas Kofler	(Poland) Adam Malysz
2013	(Italy) Val di Fiemme	23 February	HS106	(Norway) Anders Bardal	(Austria) Gregor Schlierenzauer	(Slovenia) Peter Prevc
2015	(Sweden) Falun	21 February	HS100	(Norway) Rune Velta	(Germany) Severin Freund	(Austria) Stefan Kraft
2017	(Finland) Lahti	25 February	HS100	(Austria) Stefan Kraft	(Germany) Andreas Wellinger	(Germany) Markus Eisenbichler
2019	(Austria) Seefeld	1 March	HS109	(Poland) Dawid Kubacki	(Poland) Kamil Stoch	(Austria) Stefan Kraft
2021	(Germany) Oberstdorf	27 February	HS106	(Poland) Piotr Żyła	(Germany) Karl Geiger	(Slovenia) Anže Lanišek
2023	(Slovenia) Planica	25 February	HS102	(Poland) Piotr Żyła (2)	(Germany) Andreas Wellinger	(Germany) Karl Geiger
2025	(Norway) Trondheim	2 March	HS102	(Norway) Marius Lindvik	(Germany) Andreas Wellinger	(Austria) Jan Hörl

Medal table

Rank	Nation	Gold	Silver	Bronze	Total
1	Poland	6	2	1	9
2	Austria	5	5	7	17
3	Norway	5	2	4	11
4	East Germany	4	3	1	8
5	Japan	3	4	2	9
6	Finland	1	3	4	8
7	Slovenia	1	0	2	3
7	Soviet Union	1	0	2	3
9	Czechoslovakia	1	0	0	1
10	Germany	0	6	2	8
11	Czech Republic	0	1	1	2
11	Switzerland	0	1	1	2
Totals (12 entries)		**27**	**27**	**27**	**81**

=== Large hill team ===
Unofficial first ever demonstration team event: 1978. Officially debuted: 1982.

Edition	Place	Date	Hill	Gold	Silver	Bronze
1982	(Norway) Oslo	26 February	K105	Norway Johan Sætre; Per Bergerud; Ole Bremseth; Olav Hansson	Austria Hans Wallner; Hubert Neuper; Armin Kogler; Andreas Felder	Finland Keijo Korhonen; Jari Puikkonen; Pentti Kokkonen; Matti Nykänen
1984	(Switzerland) Engelberg	26 February	K120	Finland Markku Pusenius; Pentti Kokkonen; Jari Puikkonen; Matti Nykänen	East Germany Ulf Findeisen; Matthias Buse; Klaus Ostwald; Jens Weißflog	Czechoslovakia Ladislav Dluhoš; Vladimír Podzimek; Jiří Parma; Pavel Ploc
1985	(Austria) Seefeld	22 January	K109	Finland Tuomo Ylipulli; Pentti Kokkonen (2); Matti Nykänen; Jari Puikkonen	Austria Andreas Felder; Armin Kogler; Günther Stranner; Ernst Vettori	East Germany Frank Sauerbrey; Manfred Deckert; Klaus Ostwald; Jens Weißflog
1987	(West Germany) Oberstdorf	17 February	K115	Finland Matti Nykänen; Ari-Pekka Nikkola; Tuomo Ylipulli (2); Pekka Suorsa	Norway Ole Christian Eidhammer; Hroar Stjernen; Ole Gunnar Fidjestøl; Vegard Opaas	Austria Ernst Vettori; Richard Schallert; Franz Neuländtner; Andreas Felder
1989	(Finland) Lahti	22 February	K114	Finland Ari-Pekka Nikkola; Jari Puikkonen (3); Matti Nykänen (4); Risto Laakkonen	Norway Magne Johansen; Clas-Brede Bråthen; Ole Gunnar Fidjestøl; Jon Inge Kjørum	Czechoslovakia Jiří Parma; Martin Švagerko; Ladislav Dluhoš; Pavel Ploc
1991	(Italy) Val di Fiemme	8 February	K115	Austria Heinz Kuttin; Ernst Vettori; Stefan Horngacher; Andreas Felder	Finland Ari-Pekka Nikkola; Raimo Ylipulli; Vesa Hakala; Risto Laakonen	Germany Heiko Hunger; André Kiesewetter; Dieter Thoma; Jens Weißflog
1993	(Sweden) Falun	23 February	K115	Norway Bjørn Myrbakken; Helge Brendryen; Øyvind Berg; Espen Bredesen	Czech Republic František Jež; Jiří Parma; Jaroslav Sakala and Slovakia Martin Švagerko	Austria Ernst Vettori; Heinz Kuttin; Stefan Horngacher; Andreas Goldberger
1995	(Canada) Thunder Bay	16 March	K120	Finland Jani Soininen; Janne Ahonen; Mika Laitinen; Ari-Pekka Nikkola	Germany Jens Weißflog; Gerd Siegmund; Hansjörg Jäkle; Dieter Thoma	Japan Takanobu Okabe; Jinya Nishikata; Hiroya Saitō; Naoki Yasuzaki
1997	(Norway) Trondheim	27 February	K120	Finland Ari-Pekka Nikkola (4); Jani Soininen (2); Mika Laitinen (2); Janne Ahonen	Japan Kazuyoshi Funaki; Takanobu Okabe; Masahiko Harada; Hiroya Saitō	Germany Christof Duffner; Martin Schmitt; Hansjörg Jäkle; Dieter Thoma
1999	(Austria) Ramsau	20 February	K120	Germany Sven Hannawald; Christof Duffner; Dieter Thoma; Martin Schmitt	Japan Noriaki Kasai; Hideharu Miyahira; Masahiko Harada; Kazuyoshi Funaki	Austria Andreas Widhölzl; Martin Höllwarth; Reinhard Schwarzenberger; Stefan Horngacher
2001	(Finland) Lahti	21 February	K116	Germany Sven Hannawald (2); Michael Uhrmann; Alexander Herr; Martin Schmitt (2)	Finland Risto Jussilainen; Jani Soininen; Ville Kantee; Janne Ahonen	Austria Andreas Goldberger; Wolfgang Loitzl; Martin Höllwarth; Stefan Horngacher
2003	(Italy) Val di Fiemme	23 February	K120	Finland Janne Ahonen (3); Tami Kiuru; Arttu Lappi; Matti Hautamäki	Japan Kazuyoshi Funaki; Akira Higashi; Hideharu Miyahira; Noriaki Kasai	Norway Tommy Ingebrigtsen; Lars Bystøl; Sigurd Pettersen; Bjørn Einar Romøren
2005	(Germany) Oberstdorf	26 February	HS137	Austria Wolfgang Loitzl; Andreas Widhölzl; Thomas Morgenstern; Martin Höllwarth	Finland Risto Jussilainen; Tami Kiuru; Matti Hautamäki; Janne Ahonen	Norway Bjørn Einar Romøren; Sigurd Pettersen; Lars Bystøl; Roar Ljøkelsøy
2007	(Japan) Sapporo	25 February	HS134	Austria Wolfgang Loitzl; Gregor Schlierenzauer; Andreas Kofler; Thomas Morgenstern	Norway Tom Hilde; Anders Bardal; Anders Jacobsen; Roar Ljøkelsøy	Japan Shōhei Tochimoto; Takanobu Okabe; Daiki Itō; Noriaki Kasai
2009	(Czech Republic) Liberec	28 February	HS134	Austria Wolfgang Loitzl; Martin Koch; Thomas Morgenstern; Gregor Schlierenzauer	Norway Anders Bardal; Tom Hilde; Johan Remen Evensen; Anders Jacobsen	Japan Shōhei Tochimoto; Takanobu Okabe; Daiki Itō; Noriaki Kasai
2011	(Norway) Oslo	5 March	HS134	Austria Gregor Schlierenzauer; Martin Koch (2); Andreas Kofler (2); Thomas Morgenstern	Norway Anders Jacobsen; Bjoern Einar Romoeren; Anders Bardal; Tom Hilde	Slovenia Peter Prevc; Jurij Tepeš; Jernej Damjan; Robert Kranjec
2013	(Italy) Val di Fiemme	2 March	HS134	Austria Wolfgang Loitzl (4); Manuel Fettner; Thomas Morgenstern **(5)**; Gregor Schlierenzauer (4)	Germany Andreas Wank; Severin Freund; Michael Neumayer; Richard Freitag	Poland Maciej Kot; Piotr Żyła; Dawid Kubacki; Kamil Stoch
2015	(Sweden) Falun	28 February	HS134	Norway Anders Bardal; Anders Jacobsen; Anders Fannemel; Rune Velta	Austria Stefan Kraft; Michael Hayböck; Manuel Poppinger; Gregor Schlierenzauer	Poland Piotr Żyła; Klemens Murańka; Jan Ziobro; Kamil Stoch
2017	(Finland) Lahti	4 March	HS130	Poland Piotr Żyła; Dawid Kubacki; Maciej Kot; Kamil Stoch	Norway Anders Fannemel; Johann André Forfang; Daniel-André Tande; Andreas Stjernen	Austria Michael Hayböck; Manuel Fettner; Gregor Schlierenzauer; Stefan Kraft
2019	(Austria) Seefeld	24 February	HS130	Germany Karl Geiger; Richard Freitag; Stephan Leyhe; Markus Eisenbichler	Austria Philipp Aschenwald; Michael Hayböck; Daniel Huber; Stefan Kraft	Japan Yukiya Satō; Daiki Itō; Junshirō Kobayashi; Ryōyū Kobayashi
2021	(Germany) Oberstdorf	6 March	HS137	Germany Pius Paschke; Severin Freund; Markus Eisenbichler (2); Karl Geiger (2)	Austria Philipp Aschenwald; Jan Hörl; Daniel Huber; Stefan Kraft	Poland Piotr Żyła; Andrzej Stękała; Kamil Stoch; Dawid Kubacki
2023	(Slovenia) Planica	4 March	HS138	Slovenia Lovro Kos; Žiga Jelar; Timi Zajc; Anže Lanišek	Norway Johann André Forfang; Kristoffer Eriksen Sundal; Marius Lindvik; Halvor Egner Granerud	Austria Daniel Tschofenig; Michael Hayböck; Jan Hörl; Stefan Kraft
2025	(Norway) Trondheim	6 March	HS138	Slovenia Lovro Kos (2); Domen Prevc; Timi Zajc (2); Anže Lanišek (2)	Austria Daniel Tschofenig; Maximilian Ortner; Stefan Kraft; Jan Hörl	Norway Johann André Forfang; Robin Pedersen; Kristoffer Eriksen Sundal; Marius Lindvik

1984 Extra World Championships in Engelberg, Switzerland as the team event was not on the program for the 1984 Winter Olympics in Sarajevo.
In 2013 Norway initially took the silver medal but were moved down to fourth place when it was discovered that Anders Bardal got too many points after his first jump.

Medal table

Rank	Nation	Gold	Silver	Bronze	Total
1	Finland	7	3	1	11
2	Austria	6	6	6	18
3	Germany	4	2	2	8
4	Norway	3	7	3	13
5	Slovenia	2	0	1	3
6	Poland	1	0	3	4
7	Japan	0	3	4	7
8	East Germany	0	1	1	2
9	Czech Republic	0	1	0	1
9	Slovakia	0	1	0	1
11	Czechoslovakia	0	0	2	2
Totals (11 entries)		**23**	**24**	**23**	**70**

=== Normal hill team (discontinued) ===
Debuted: 2001. Not held: 2003. Resumed: 2005. Not held: 2007–2009. Resumed: 2011. Discontinued: 2011.

Edition	Place	Date	Hill	Gold	Silver	Bronze
2001	(Finland) Lahti	25 February	K90	Austria Wolfgang Loitzl; Andreas Goldberger; Stefan Horngacher; Martin Höllwarth	Finland Matti Hautamäki; Risto Jussilainen; Ville Kantee; Janne Ahonen	Germany Sven Hannawald; Michael Uhrmann; Alexander Herr; Martin Schmitt
2005	(Germany) Oberstdorf	20 February	HS100	Austria Wolfgang Loitzl **(2)**; Andreas Widhölzl; Thomas Morgenstern; Martin Höllwarth **(2)**	Germany Michael Neumayer; Martin Schmitt; Michael Uhrmann; Georg Späth	Slovenia Primož Peterka; Jure Bogataj; Rok Benkovič; Jernej Damjan
2011	(Norway) Oslo	27 February	HS106	Austria Gregor Schlierenzauer; Martin Koch; Andreas Kofler; Thomas Morgenstern **(2)**	Norway Anders Jacobsen; Bjørn Einar Romøren; Anders Bardal; Tom Hilde	Germany Martin Schmitt; Michael Neumayer; Michael Uhrmann; Severin Freund

Medal table

Rank	Nation	Gold	Silver	Bronze	Total
1	Austria	3	0	0	3
2	Germany	0	1	2	3
3	Finland	0	1	0	1
3	Norway	0	1	0	1
5	Slovenia	0	0	1	1
Totals (5 entries)		**3**	**3**	**3**	**9**

== Women ==
=== Normal hill individual ===
Debuted: 2009.

Edition	Place	Date	Hill	Gold	Silver	Bronze
2009	(Czech Republic) Liberec	20 February	HS100	(United States) Lindsey Van	(Germany) Ulrike Gräßler	(Norway) Anette Sagen
2011	(Norway) Oslo	25 February	HS106	(Austria) Daniela Iraschko	(Italy) Elena Runggaldier	(France) Coline Mattel
2013	(Italy) Val di Fiemme	22 February	HS106	(United States) Sarah Hendrickson	(Japan) Sara Takanashi	(Austria) Jacqueline Seifriedsberger
2015	(Sweden) Falun	20 February	HS100	(Germany) Carina Vogt	(Japan) Yūki Itō	(Austria) Daniela Iraschko-Stolz
2017	(Finland) Lahti	24 February	HS100	(Germany) Carina Vogt **(2)**	(Japan) Yūki Itō	(Japan) Sara Takanashi
2019	(Austria) Seefeld	27 February	HS109	(Norway) Maren Lundby	(Germany) Katharina Althaus	(Austria) Daniela Iraschko-Stolz
2021	(Germany) Oberstdorf	25 February	HS106	(Slovenia) Ema Klinec	(Norway) Maren Lundby	(Japan) Sara Takanashi
2023	(Slovenia) Planica	23 February	HS102	(Germany) Katharina Althaus	(Austria) Eva Pinkelnig	(Norway) Anna Odine Strøm
2025	(Norway) Trondheim	28 February	HS102	(Slovenia) Nika Prevc	(Germany) Selina Freitag	(Norway) Anna Odine Strøm

Medal table

Rank	Nation	Gold	Silver	Bronze	Total
1	Germany	3	3	0	6
2	Slovenia	2	0	0	2
2	United States	2	0	0	2
4	Austria	1	1	3	5
4	Norway	1	1	3	5
6	Japan	0	3	2	5
7	Italy	0	1	0	1
8	France	0	0	1	1
Totals (8 entries)		**9**	**9**	**9**	**27**

=== Large hill individual ===
Debuted: 2021

Edition	Place	Date	Hill	Gold	Silver	Bronze
2021	(Germany) Oberstdorf	3 March	HS137	(Norway) Maren Lundby	(Japan) Sara Takanashi	(Slovenia) Nika Križnar
2023	(Slovenia) Planica	1 March	HS138	(Canada) Alexandria Loutitt	(Norway) Maren Lundby	(Germany) Katharina Althaus
2025	(Norway) Trondheim	7 March	HS138	(Slovenia) Nika Prevc	(Germany) Selina Freitag	(Norway) Eirin Maria Kvandal

Medal table

Rank	Nation	Gold	Silver	Bronze	Total
1	Norway	1	1	1	3
2	Slovenia	1	0	1	2
3	Canada	1	0	0	1
4	Germany	0	1	1	2
5	Japan	0	1	0	1
Totals (5 entries)		**3**	**3**	**3**	**9**

=== Normal hill team ===
Debuted: 2019.

Edition	Place	Date	Hill	Gold	Silver	Bronze
2019	(Austria) Seefeld	26 February	HS109	Germany Juliane Seyfarth; Ramona Straub; Carina Vogt; Katharina Althaus	Austria Eva Pinkelnig; Jacqueline Seifriedsberger; Chiara Hölzl; Daniela Iraschko-Stolz	Norway Anna Odine Strøm; Ingebjørg Saglien Bråten; Silje Opseth; Maren Lundby
2021	(Germany) Oberstdorf	26 February	HS106	Austria Daniela Iraschko-Stolz; Sophie Sorschag; Chiara Hölzl; Marita Kramer	Slovenia Nika Križnar; Špela Rogelj; Urša Bogataj; Ema Klinec	Norway Silje Opseth; Anna Odine Strøm; Thea Minyan Bjørseth; Maren Lundby
2023	(Slovenia) Planica	25 February	HS102	Germany Anna Rupprecht; Luisa Görlich; Selina Freitag; Katharina Althaus **(2)**	Austria Chiara Kreuzer; Julia Mühlbacher; Jacqueline Seifriedsberger; Eva Pinkelnig	Norway Maren Lundby; Eirin Maria Kvandal; Thea Minyan Bjørseth; Anna Odine Strøm
2025	(Norway) Trondheim	1 March	HS102	Norway Anna Odine Strøm; Ingvild Synnøve Midtskogen; Heidi Dyhre Tråserud; Eirin Maria Kvandal	Austria Lisa Eder; Julia Mühlbacher; Jacqueline Seifriedsberger; Eva Pinkelnig	Germany Juliane Seyfarth; Katharina Schmid; Agnes Reisch; Selina Freitag

Medal table

Rank	Nation	Gold	Silver	Bronze	Total
1	Germany	2	0	1	3
2	Austria	1	3	0	4
3	Norway	1	0	3	4
4	Slovenia	0	1	0	1
Totals (4 entries)		**4**	**4**	**4**	**12**

== Mixed ==
=== Mixed team normal hill (discontinued) ===
Debuted: 2013. Discontinued: 2023.

Edition	Place	Date	Hill	Gold	Silver	Bronze
2013	(Italy) Val di Fiemme	24 February	HS106	Japan Yūki Itō; Daiki Itō; Sara Takanashi; Taku Takeuchi	Austria Chiara Hölzl; Thomas Morgenstern; Jacqueline Seifriedsberger; Gregor Schlierenzauer	Germany Ulrike Gräßler; Richard Freitag; Carina Vogt; Severin Freund
2015	(Sweden) Falun	22 February	HS100	Germany Carina Vogt; Richard Freitag; Katharina Althaus; Severin Freund	Norway Line Jahr; Anders Bardal; Maren Lundby; Rune Velta	Japan Sara Takanashi; Noriaki Kasai; Yūki Itō; Taku Takeuchi
2017	(Finland) Lahti	26 February	HS100	Germany Carina Vogt (2); Markus Eisenbichler; Svenja Würth; Andreas Wellinger	Austria Daniela Iraschko-Stolz; Michael Hayböck; Jacqueline Seifriedsberger; Stefan Kraft	Japan Sara Takanashi; Taku Takeuchi; Yūki Itō; Daiki Itō
2019	(Austria) Seefeld	2 March	HS109	Germany Katharina Althaus; Markus Eisenbichler; Juliane Seyfarth; Karl Geiger	Austria Eva Pinkelnig; Philipp Aschenwald; Daniela Iraschko-Stolz; Stefan Kraft	Norway Anna Odine Strøm; Robert Johansson; Maren Lundby; Andreas Stjernen
2021	(Germany) Oberstdorf	28 February	HS106	Germany Katharina Althaus; Markus Eisenbichler (3); Anna Rupprecht; Karl Geiger	Norway Silje Opseth; Robert Johansson; Maren Lundby; Halvor Egner Granerud	Austria Marita Kramer; Michael Hayböck; Daniela Iraschko-Stolz; Stefan Kraft
2023	(Slovenia) Planica	26 February	HS102	Germany Selina Freitag; Karl Geiger (3); Katharina Althaus **(4)**; Andreas Wellinger (2)	Norway Anna Odine Strøm; Johann André Forfang; Thea Minyan Bjørseth; Halvor Egner Granerud	Slovenia Nika Križnar; Timi Zajc; Ema Klinec; Anže Lanišek

Medal table

Rank	Nation	Gold	Silver	Bronze	Total
1	Germany	5	0	1	6
2	Japan	1	0	2	3
3	Austria	0	3	1	4
3	Norway	0	3	1	4
5	Slovenia	0	0	1	1
Totals (5 entries)		**6**	**6**	**6**	**18**

=== Mixed team large hill ===
Debuted: 2025.

Edition	Place	Date	Hill	Gold	Silver	Bronze
2025	(Norway) Trondheim	5 March	HS138	Norway Anna Odine Strøm; Marius Lindvik; Eirin Maria Kvandal; Johann André Forfang	Slovenia Ema Klinec; Domen Prevc; Nika Prevc; Anže Lanišek	Austria Eva Pinkelnig; Stefan Kraft; Jacqueline Seifriedsberger; Jan Hörl

Medal table

Rank	Nation	Gold	Silver	Bronze	Total
1	Norway	1	0	0	1
2	Slovenia	0	1	0	1
3	Austria	0	0	1	1
Totals (3 entries)		**1**	**1**	**1**	**3**

== Medal table ==
Table updated after the 2025 Championships.

Rank	Nation	Gold	Silver	Bronze	Total
1	Norway	25	28	27	80
2	Austria	20	23	21	64
3	Germany	19	18	12	49
4	Finland	14	12	9	35
5	Poland	9	4	7	20
6	Slovenia	8	3	6	17
7	East Germany	6	6	4	16
8	Japan	5	13	13	31
9	Switzerland	3	2	4	9
10	Czechoslovakia	2	3	4	9
11	Soviet Union	2	1	2	5
12	United States	2	0	0	2
13	Sweden	1	1	6	8
14	Canada	1	0	0	1
14	Yugoslavia	1	0	0	1
16	Czech Republic	0	3	2	5
17	Italy	0	1	0	1
17	Slovakia	0	1	0	1
19	France	0	0	1	1
Totals (19 entries)		**118**	**119**	**118**	**355**

== Most successful athletes (by number of victories) ==
Boldface denotes active ski jumpers and highest medal count among all ski jumpers (including these who not included in these tables) per type.

=== Men ===
==== All events ====
Rank	Ski jumper	Country	From	To	Gold	Silver	Bronze	Total
1	Thomas Morgenstern	Austria	2005	2013	**8**	2	1	11
2	Wolfgang Loitzl	Austria	2001	2013	7	–	1	8
3	Gregor Schlierenzauer	Austria	2007	2017	6	5	1	12
4	Markus Eisenbichler	Germany	2017	2021	6	–	1	7
5	Janne Ahonen	Finland	1995	2005	5	3	2	10
6	**Karl Geiger**	Germany	2019	2023	5	2	2	9
7	Matti Nykänen	Finland	1982	1989	5	1	3	9
8	Martin Schmitt	Germany	1997	2011	4	3	3	10
9	Ari-Pekka Nikkola	Finland	1987	1997	4	2	1	7
9	Jari Puikkonen	Finland	1982	1989	4	2	1	7

==== Individual events ====
Rank	Ski jumper	Country	From	To	Gold	Silver	Bronze	Total
1	Adam Małysz	Poland	2001	2011	**4**	1	1	**6**
2	Birger Ruud	Norway	1931	1939	3	1	–	4
3	**Stefan Kraft**	Austria	2015	2021	3	–	2	5
4	Martin Schmitt	Germany	1999	2009	2	2	–	4
5	Jens Weißflog	East Germany; Germany	1985	1993	2	1	2	5
6	Masahiko Harada	Japan	1993	1999	2	1	1	4
7	Janne Ahonen	Finland	1997	2005	2	–	2	4
8	**Piotr Żyła**	Poland	2017	2023	2	–	1	3
9	Hans-Georg Aschenbach	East Germany	1974	1974	2	–	–	2
9	Gariy Napalkov	Soviet Union	1970	1970	2	–	–	2
9	Bjørn Wirkola	Norway	1966	1966	2	–	–	2

=== Women ===
==== All events ====
Rank	Ski jumper	Country	From	To	Gold	Silver	Bronze	Total
1	**Katharina Schmid (Althaus)**	Germany	2015	2025	**7**	1	2	**10**
2	Carina Vogt	Germany	2013	2019	5	–	1	6
3	Maren Lundby	Norway	2015	2023	2	4	4	**10**
4	Daniela Iraschko-Stolz	Austria	2011	2021	2	3	3	8
5	**Selina Freitag**	Germany	2023	2025	2	2	1	5
6	**Anna Odine Strøm**	Norway	2019	2025	2	1	**6**	9
7	**Nika Prevc**	Slovenia	2025	2025	2	1	–	3
8	**Eirin Maria Kvandal**	Norway	2023	2025	2	–	2	4
9	**Juliane Seyfarth**	Germany	2019	2025	2	–	1	3
10	**Anna Rupprecht**	Germany	2021	2023	2	–	–	2

==== Individual events ====
Rank	Ski jumper	Country	From	To	Gold	Silver	Bronze	Total
1	Maren Lundby	Norway	2019	2023	**2**	**2**	–	**4**
2	**Nika Prevc**	Slovenia	2025	2025	**2**	–	–	2
2	Carina Vogt	Germany	2015	2017	**2**	–	–	2
4	**Katharina Althaus**	Germany	2019	2023	1	1	1	3
5	Daniela Iraschko-Stolz	Austria	2011	2019	1	–	**2**	3
6	Sarah Hendrickson	United States	2013	2013	1	–	–	1
6	**Ema Klinec**	Slovenia	2021	2021	1	–	–	1
6	**Alexandria Loutitt**	Canada	2023	2023	1	–	–	1
6	Lindsey Van	United States	2009	2009	1	–	–	1
10	**Sara Takanashi**	Japan	2013	2021	–	**2**	**2**	**4**

== Best performers by country ==
Here are listed most successful ski jumpers in the history of each medal-winning national team – according to the gold-first ranking system and by total number of World Championships medals (one jumper if he holds national records in both categories or few jumpers if these national records belongs to different persons). If the total number of medals is identical, the gold, silver and bronze medals are used as tie-breakers (in that order). If all numbers are the same, the jumpers get the same placement and are sorted by the alphabetic order.

Country	Ski jumper	From	To	Gold	Silver	Bronze	Total
Austria	Thomas Morgenstern (by the gold first ranking system)	2005	2013	**8**	2	1	11
Austria	**Stefan Kraft** (by total number of medals)	2015	2025	3	**6**	**6**	**15**
Germany	**Katharina Schmid (Althaus)**	2015	2025	7	1	2	10
Finland	Janne Ahonen	1995	2005	5	3	2	10
Poland	Adam Małysz (by the gold first ranking system)	2001	2011	4	1	1	6
Poland	**Piotr Żyła** (by total number of medals)	2013	2023	3	–	4	7
Norway	Birger Ruud (by the gold first ranking system)	1931	1939	3	1	–	4
Norway	Maren Lundby (by total number of medals)	2015	2023	2	4	4	10
Slovenia	**Timi Zajc** (by the gold first ranking system)	2023	2025	3	–	1	4
Slovenia	**Anže Lanišek** (by total number of medals)	2021	2025	2	1	2	5
East Germany; Germany	Jens Weißflog	1984	1995	2	3	4	9
Japan	Masahiko Harada (by the gold first ranking system)	1993	1999	2	3	1	6
Japan	**Sara Takanashi** (by total number of medals)	2013	2021	1	2	4	7
East Germany (as such only)	Jens Weißflog	1984	1989	2	2	1	5
Soviet Union	Gariy Napalkov	1970	1970	2	–	–	2
Switzerland	**Simon Ammann**	2007	2011	1	1	2	4
Czechoslovakia	Jiří Parma (including 1 silver medal won for combined team of the Czech Republic and Slovakia)	1987	1993	1	1	2	4
Czechoslovakia	Willen Dick	1925	1927	1	1	–	2
Canada	**Alexandria Loutitt***	2023	2023	1	–	–	1
Sweden	Tore Edman (by the gold first ranking system)	1927	1927	1	–	–	1
Sweden	Sven Eriksson (by total number of medals)	1931	1934	–	–	3	3
United States	Sarah Hendrickson	2013	2013	1	–	–	1
United States	Lindsey Van	2009	2009	1	–	–	1
Yugoslavia	Franci Petek*	1991	1991	1	–	–	1
Czech Republic	Jaroslav Sakala (including 1 silver medal won for combined team of the Czech Republic and Slovakia)	1993	1993	–	2	1	3
Czech Republic	Jakub Janda	2005	2005	–	1	1	2
Slovakia	Martin Švagerko* (including 1 bronze medal won for Czechoslovakia and 1 silver medal won for combined team of the Czech Republic and Slovakia)	1989	1993	–	1	1	2
Italy	Elena Runggaldier*	2011	2011	–	1	–	1
France	Coline Mattel*	2011	2011	–	–	1	1

An asterisk (*) marks athletes who are the only representatives of their respective countries to win a medal.

== See also ==
- Ski jumping at the Winter Olympics
- List of Olympic medalists in ski jumping
- Ski jumping World Cup
