= Ski jumping at the 1928 Winter Olympics =

Men's ski jumping at the II Olympic Winter Games
- Venue: Olympiaschanze
- Dates: 18 February 1928
- Competitors: 38 from 13 nations
- Winning points: 19.208

Medalists
1st place, gold medalist(s)		Alf Andersen	Norway
2nd place, silver medalist(s)		Sigmund Ruud	Norway
3rd place, bronze medalist(s)		Rudolf Burkert	Czechoslovakia

The men's ski jumping at the 1928 Winter Olympics took place at the 70-meter (230 ft) Olympiaschanze in St. Moritz, Switzerland, on 18 February. Thirty-eight competitors from thirteen nations competed, with the event being won by Norway's Alf Andersen ahead of countryman Sigmund Ruud and Czechoslovakia's Rudolf Burkert.

Norway sent a strong contingent with four jumpers able to win the event, including reigning Olympic and world champion Jacob Tullin Thams. Andersen had won all eight Norwegian qualification events. World record holder Nels Nelsen from Canada was not permitted to participate due to financial problems. Japan participated in an international ski jumping competition for the first time, also becoming the first Asian country to do so. After the first jump, three Norwegians were in the lead. A 40-minute discussion erupted regarding the speed, with Central European jumpers wanting it increased. This was complied with by the jury, resulting in falls by several favorites, including the most vocal speed increase proponents, Gérard Vuilleumier and Bruno Trojani. Andersen and Ruud won by reducing their speed on the in-run.

== Venue ==
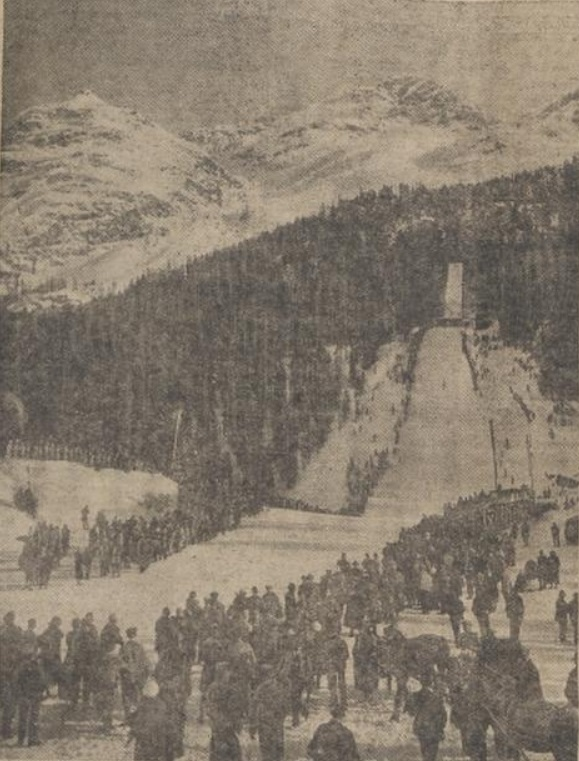
Olympiaschanze during the 1928 Winter Olympics

The event took place at Olympiaschanze, located in the neighborhood of St. Moritz Bad. The town's first ski jumping hill, Julierschanze, opened in 1895. However, it was not large enough for the Olympic tournaments, forcing the town to build a larger venue. Construction started in 1926 and the venue in inaugurated on 20 January 1927. Olympiaschanze had a size of 70 meters (230 ft) and a crowd of 8,000 people attended the event. The venue had also hosted the Nordic combined event and would later be used for the 1948 Winter Olympics.

== Background ==
Norway sent a strong delegation with four participants able to win the event. Jacob Tullin Thams had won the 1924 Winter Olympics event and has also won the 1926 World Championships, making him reigning Olympic and world champion. The rest of the delegation consisted Alf Andersen, Sigmund Ruud—the oldest of the Ruud brothers—and Hans Kleppen. Andersen had won all eight Norwegian qualifications for the Olympics. Other favorites were Rudolf Burkert, who had won and the ski jumping part of the Nordic combined event, and the host nation's Gérard Vuilleumier. Asia participated for the first time in an international tournament, represented by Japan's Motohiko Ban.

Canada had originally planned to send two ski jumpers, Nels Nelsen and Melbourne McKenzie. Nelsen held world record for the longest ski jump. However, lack of funding meant that they planned for work for their fare on a freighter. These plans were stopped by officials from the British delegation, who organized the Canadian team and who felt working for their fare was inappropriate and not fitting for the team, and Nelsen never competed in any Winter Olympics.

== Race ==
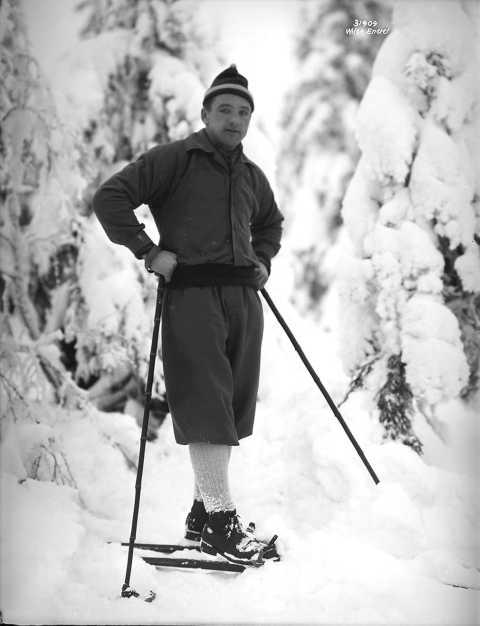
Reigning Olympic and world champion Jacob Tullin Thams

The jury consisted of Østgaard of Norway, Jilek of Czechoslovakia and Straumann of Switzerland. Because of ice on the in-run, a reduced speed was used during the first round. Andersen jumped 60.0 meters, by far the longest jump. Lengthwise, Ruud and Vuilleumier were in joint second place with 57.5 meters, while Burket was in fourth with 57.0 meters. Thams, Kleppen and Poland's Bronisław Czech all jumped 56.5 meters, but both Kleppen and Czech fell. In terms of points, the three Norwegians Andersen, Ruud and Thams were in the lead, ahead of Burket and Vuilleumier.

In the break, a number of Central Europeans, including Vuilleumier and Bruno Trojani, asked for top speed. This was protested by the Scandinavian and United States jumpers, and a 40-minute discussion broke out. At one point, one of the facilitators at the in-run received a telephone call confirming top speed. The facilitator was skeptical, and chose to call back to the judges, who could confirm that they had not given such a go-ahead. In the end, the judges chose to allow higher speeds, with a compromise of 5.0 meters more distance. However, the facilitator only moved the rope 4.5 meters. This made the Swiss furious, and they used their knives to cut the rope. They then accused the participants who were opposed to full speed of being cowards.

Andersen and Ruud skied down the in-run in a standing position to reduce their speed, and had the two longest standing jumps. The event is regarded as the international break-through for Ruud. Thams gave full speed and landed at 73.0 meters, but fell and ended on a 28th place. Had he stood, it would have been a new world record. The wounds were serious enough that he had to be taken to hospital. Afterwards he stated: "I at least showed those guys that we are not cowards". Also Vuillemiuer and Trojani became subject to the higher speeds, both falling and ending with a 30th and 32nd place, respectively. Ban had the shortest jump in both rounds, fell in the first round, and ended last.

== Results ==
The following is a list of all participants, noting their rank, country, the length in the first and second round, and the judge score for each of the three judges, as well as the final score. (F) denotes a fall.

Results
Rank	Ski jumper	Length 1	Length 2	Judge 1	Judge 2	Judge 3	Score
1	Alf Andersen (NOR)	60.0	64.0	19.250	19.375	19.000	19.208
2	Sigmund Ruud (NOR)	57.5	62.5	18.125	18.875	18.625	18.542
3	Rudolf Burkert (TCH)	57.0	59.5	17.562	18.312	17.937	17.937
4	Axel-Herman Nilsson (SWE)	53.5	60.0	16.937	16.875	16.937	16.937
5	Sven-Olof Lundgren (SWE)	48.0	59.0	16.750	16.875	16.500	16.708
6	Rolf Monsen (USA)	53.0	59.5	16.437	16.937	16.687	16.687
7	Sepp Mühlbauer (SUI)	52.0	58.0	16.500	16.375	16.750	16.541
8	Ernst Feuz (SUI)	52.5	58.5	16.500	16.250	16.625	16.458
9	Martin Neuner (GER)	50.0	57.0	16.500	16.375	16.000	16.291
10	Bertil Carlsson (SWE)	51.5	61.0	16.062	16.437	16.062	16.187
11	Erich Recknagel (GER)	48.5	62.0	15.812	15.687	16.562	16.020
12	Paavo Nuotio (FIN)	50.0	56.0	15.625	15.750	16.125	15.833
13	Vitale Venzi (ITA)	50.0	59.0	15.750	15.375	16.125	15.750
14	Charles Proctor (USA)	49.0	56.0	15.125	16.125	15.500	15.583
15	Willy Möhwald (TCH)	46.0	59.0	15.250	15.750	15.500	15.500
16	Gerald Dupuis (CAN)	49.0	51.0	15.375	15.500	15.625	15.500
17	Franz Thannheimer (GER)	46.5	53.5	15.250	15.375	15.375	15.333
18	Anders Haugen (USA)	51.0	53.0	14.875	15.500	15.500	15.291
19	Alois Kratzer (GER)	49.5	54.0	14.437	14.687	14.437	14.853
20	Josef Bím (TCH)	49.5	51.0	14.687	14.812	14.437	14.728
21	Karl Wondrak (TCH)	48.5	49.0	14.312	14.687	14.437	14.478
22	Esko Järvinen (FIN)	45.0	47.5	13.937	14.437	13.562	13.978
23	Stanisław Gąsienica Sieczka (POL)	41.0	58.0	14.000	13.375	14.374	13.917
24	Klébert Balmat (FRA)	44.0	54.0	13.375	14.750	13.375	13.833
25	Aleksander Rozmus (POL)	41.0	53.0	12.875	13.375	13.250	13.166
26	Martial Payot (FRA)	40.5	47.0	12.562	13.062	12.437	12.678
27	Andrzej Krzeptowski (POL)	41.5	46.5	12.437	12.937	12.437	12.604
28	Jacob Tullin Thams (NOR)	56.5	(F) 73.0	11.187	13.687	12.812	12.562
29	Harald Bosio (AUT)	36.5	52.0	12.312	11.812	12.062	12.062
30	Gérard Vuilleumier (SUI)	57.5	(F) 62.0	11.687	11.562	12.812	12.020
31	Sven Eriksson (SWE)	52.0	(F) 62.5	11.125	12.000	11.375	11.500
32	Bruno Trojani (SUI)	48.5	(F) 63.0	9.562	11.385	11.437	10.782
33	Luigi Bernasconi (ITA)	46.5	(F) 59.0	10.312	10.312	9.437	10.020
34	Luciano Zampatti (ITA)	(F) 48.0	49.5	10.687	8.187	10.187	9.687
35	Joseph Maffioli (FRA)	35.0	40.0	8.125	7.875	8.375	8.125
36	Hans Kleppen (NOR)	(F) 56.5	(F) 64.5	4.500	4.500	7.500	6.500
37	Bronisław Czech (POL)	(F) 56.5	(F) 62.5	5.000	7.000	7.000	6.333
38	Motohiko Ban (JPN)	(F) 34.0	39.0	4.000	3.750	4.250	4.000

== Participating nations ==
A total of 38 ski jumpers from 13 nations competed in the event:

- Austria (1)
- Canada (1)
- Czechoslovakia (4)
- Finland (2)
- France (3)
- Germany (4)
- Italy (3)
- Japan (1)
- Norway (4)
- Poland (4)
- Sweden (4)
- Switzerland (4)
- United States (3)
