= Karel Koldovský =

Czech ski jumper

Personal information
- Nationality: Czech
- Born: 10 June 1898; Vysoké nad Jizerou, Austria-Hungary
- Died: 29 April 1943 (aged 44)

Sport
- Sport: Ski jumping

Karel Koldovský (10 June 1898 – 29 April 1943) was a Czech ski jumper. He competed in the individual event at the 1924 Winter Olympics.
