= Thannheimer =

Thannheimer is a surname. Notable people with the surname include:

- Franz Thannheimer (1904–1971), German ski jumper
- Wendelin Thannheimer (born 1999), German Nordic combined skier
