= Knuuttila =

Knuuttila is a Finnish surname. Notable people with this surname include:

- Anselm Knuuttila (1903–1968), Finnish cross-country skier
- Petra Knuuttila and Tarja Knuuttila (badminton), 1982 winners of women's doubles at Finnish National Badminton Championships
- Sakari Knuuttila (1930–2023), Finnish engineer and politician
- Tarja Knuuttila, Finnish philosopher
- Ykä Knuuttila (born 1963), Finnish musician, drummer for Musta Paraati
