= Vuilleumier =

Vuilleumier may refer to:

== People ==
- Georges Vuilleumier (1944-1988), Swiss football striker
- Gérard Vuilleumier (1905-1984), Swiss ski jumper and cyclist

== Others ==
- Vuilleumier cycle, a thermodynamic cycle patented by a Swiss-American engineer named Rudolph Vuilleumier
