= Zampatti =

Zampatti is a surname. Notable people with the surname include:

- Carla Zampatti (1938–2021), Australian fashion designer
- Luciano Zampatti (1903–1957), Italian ski jumper
