= Möhwald =

Möhwald is a German-language surname. Notable people with this surname include:

- Kevin Möhwald (born 1993), German footballer
- Horst Möhwald (born 1938), German skier, competitor in the 1964 Winter Olympics
- Robert Möhwald (1906–1978), Czech skier, competitor in the 1928 Winter Olympics (military patrol)
- Willy Möhwald (1908–1975), Czech ski jumper, competitor in the 1928 Winter Olympics
