= Nils Sundh =

Swedish ski jumper

Personal information
- Full name: Nils Gustaf Sundh
- Nationality: Swedish
- Born: 16 October 1898 Stockholm, Sweden-Norway
- Died: 25 October 1969 (aged 71) Stockholm, Sweden

Sport
- Sport: Ski jumping

Nils Gustaf Sundh (16 October 1898 – 25 October 1969) was a Swedish ski jumper. He competed in the individual event at the 1924 Winter Olympics.

Sundh represented Djurgårdens IF.
