= Louis Albert =

French ski jumper

Personal information
- Nationality: French
- Born: 25 May 1898; Fresse-sur-Moselle, Vosges, France
- Died: 30 January 1951 (aged 52); Saint-Maurice-sur-Moselle, Vosges, France

Sport
- Sport: Ski jumping

Louis Albert (28 May 1898 – 30 January 1951) was a French ski jumper. He competed in the individual event at the 1924 Winter Olympics.
