= Motohiko Ban =

Japanese ski jumper

Personal information
- Nationality: Japanese
- Born: 1 January 1905; Kyoto, Japan
- Died: 3 September 1998 (aged 93)

Sport
- Sport: Ski jumping

Motohiko Ban (1 January 1905 – 3 September 1998) was a Japanese ski jumper. He competed in the individual event at the 1928 Winter Olympics.
