= Narve Bonna =

Norwegian ski jumper

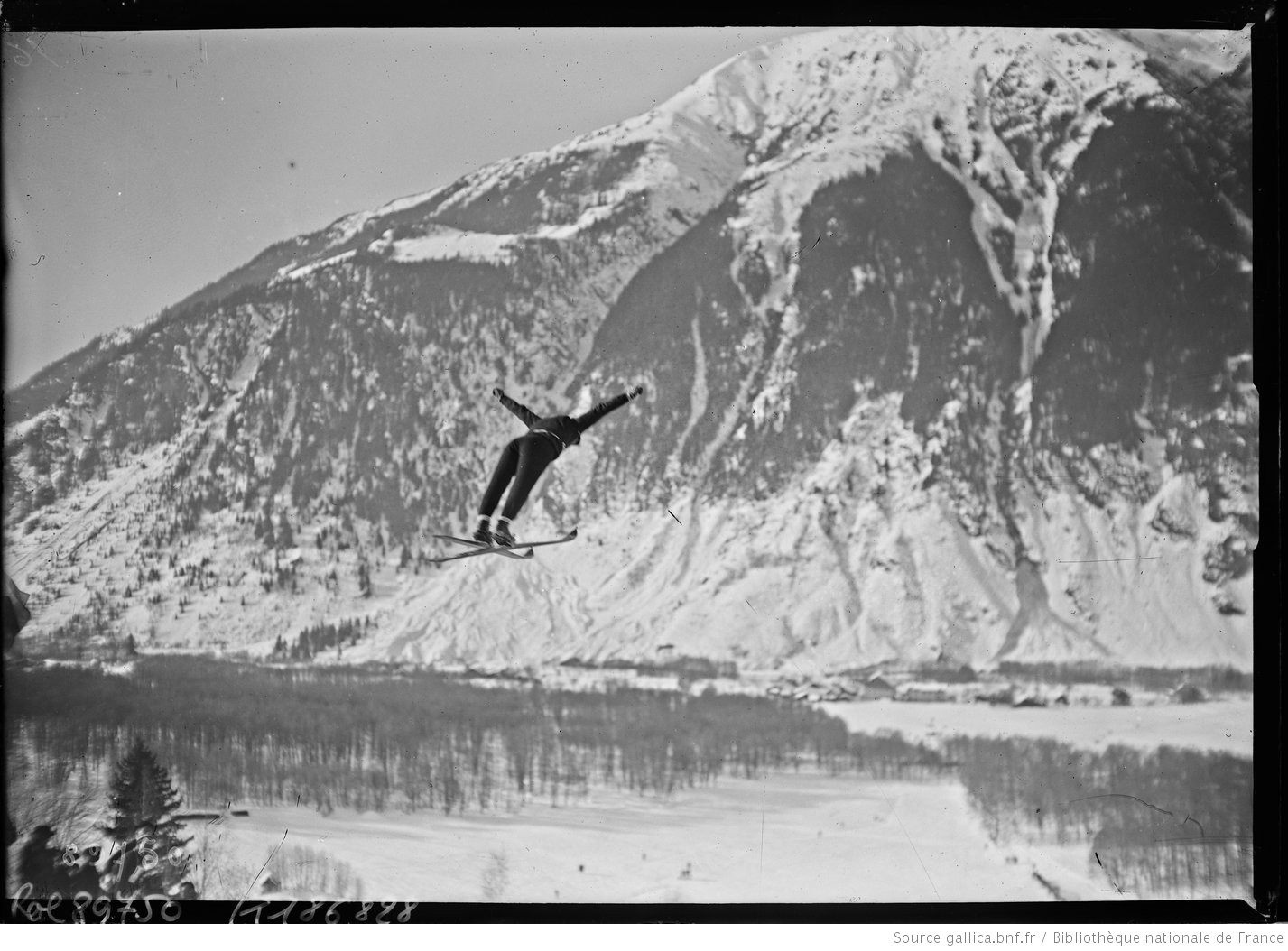

Medal record

Men's ski jumping

Representing Norway

Olympic Games
Silver medal – second place	1924 Chamonix	Individual Large Hill

World Championships
Silver medal – second place	1924 Chamonix	Individual Large Hill

Narve Bonna (16 January 1901 – 2 March 1976) was a Norwegian ski jumper.

Born in Bærum and representing Lommedalens IL, Bonna won the first Olympic ski jumping silver medal at the 1924 Winter Olympics in Chamonix.
