= Luigi Bernasconi =

Italian ski jumper

Personal information
- Nationality: Italian
- Born: 3 May 1909 Sils im Engadin/Segl, Switzerland
- Died: 2 April 1970 (aged 60) St. Moritz, Switzerland

Sport
- Sport: Ski jumping

Luigi Bernasconi (3 May 1909 – 2 April 1970) was an Italian ski jumper. He competed in the individual event at the 1928 Winter Olympics.
