= Mario Cavalla =

Italian ski jumper

Personal information
- Nationality: Italian
- Born: 22 March 1902
- Died: 1 January 1962 (aged 59)

Sport
- Sport: Ski jumping

Mario Cavalla (22 March 1902 – 1 January 1962) was an Italian ski jumper. He competed in the individual event at the 1924 Winter Olympics.
