= Joseph Maffioli =

French ski jumper

Personal information
- Nationality: French
- Born: 18 February 1904 Chamonix, France
- Died: 10 July 1965 (aged 61) Chamonix, France

Sport
- Sport: Ski jumping

Joseph Maffioli (18 February 1904 – 10 July 1965) was a French ski jumper. He competed in the individual event at the 1928 Winter Olympics.
