= Olle Hansson =

Medal record

Men's cross-country skiing

Representing Sweden

World Championships
Bronze medal – third place	1929 Zakopane	50 km

Olle Hansson (April 22, 1904 – January 22, 1991) was a Swedish cross-country skier who competed in the 1920s. He won a bronze medal at the 1929 FIS Nordic World Ski Championships in the 50 km event.

== Cross-country skiing results ==
All results are sourced from the International Ski Federation (FIS).

=== World Championships ===
- 1 medal – (1 bronze)

Year	Age	17 km	50 km
1929	24	4	Bronze
