= Luigi Faure =

Italian cross-country skier, Nordic combined skier and ski jumper

Luigi Faure (December 15, 1898 in Sauze d'Oulx – April 8, 1946) was an Italian cross-country skier, Nordic combined skier, and ski jumper who competed in the 1924 Winter Olympics in Chamonix, where he finished 17th in the total ranking of the men's normal hill event.

In the 1940s, he founded Faure sport in his home town.

== Further notable results ==
=== Ski jumping ===
- 1924: 1st, Italian ski jumping championships
- 1925: 1st, Italian ski jumping championships
- 1926: 1st, Italian ski jumping championships
- 1927: 2nd, Italian ski jumping championships

=== Nordic combined ===
- 1924: 1st, Italian championships of Nordic combined skiing
- 1925: 1st, Italian championships of Nordic combined skiing
- 1926: 1st, Italian championships of Nordic combined skiing
- 1927: 1st, Italian championships of Nordic combined skiing
- 1928: 1st, Italian championships of Nordic combined skiing
- 1929: 1st, Italian championships of Nordic combined skiing

=== Cross-country skiing ===
- 1924: 2nd, Italian men's championships of cross-country skiing, 18 km
- 1926: 2nd, Italian men's championships of cross-country skiing, 18 km
