= Gerald Dupuis =

Canadian ski jumper

Personal information
- Born: 10 August 1904; Montreal, Quebec, Canada
- Died: 8 August 1960 (aged 55); Quebec City, Quebec, Canada

Sport
- Sport: Ski jumping

Gerald Dupuis (10 August 1904 – 8 August 1960) was a Canadian ski jumper. He competed in the individual event at the 1928 Winter Olympics.
