= Josef Bím =

Czechoslovak soldier and skier (1901–1934)

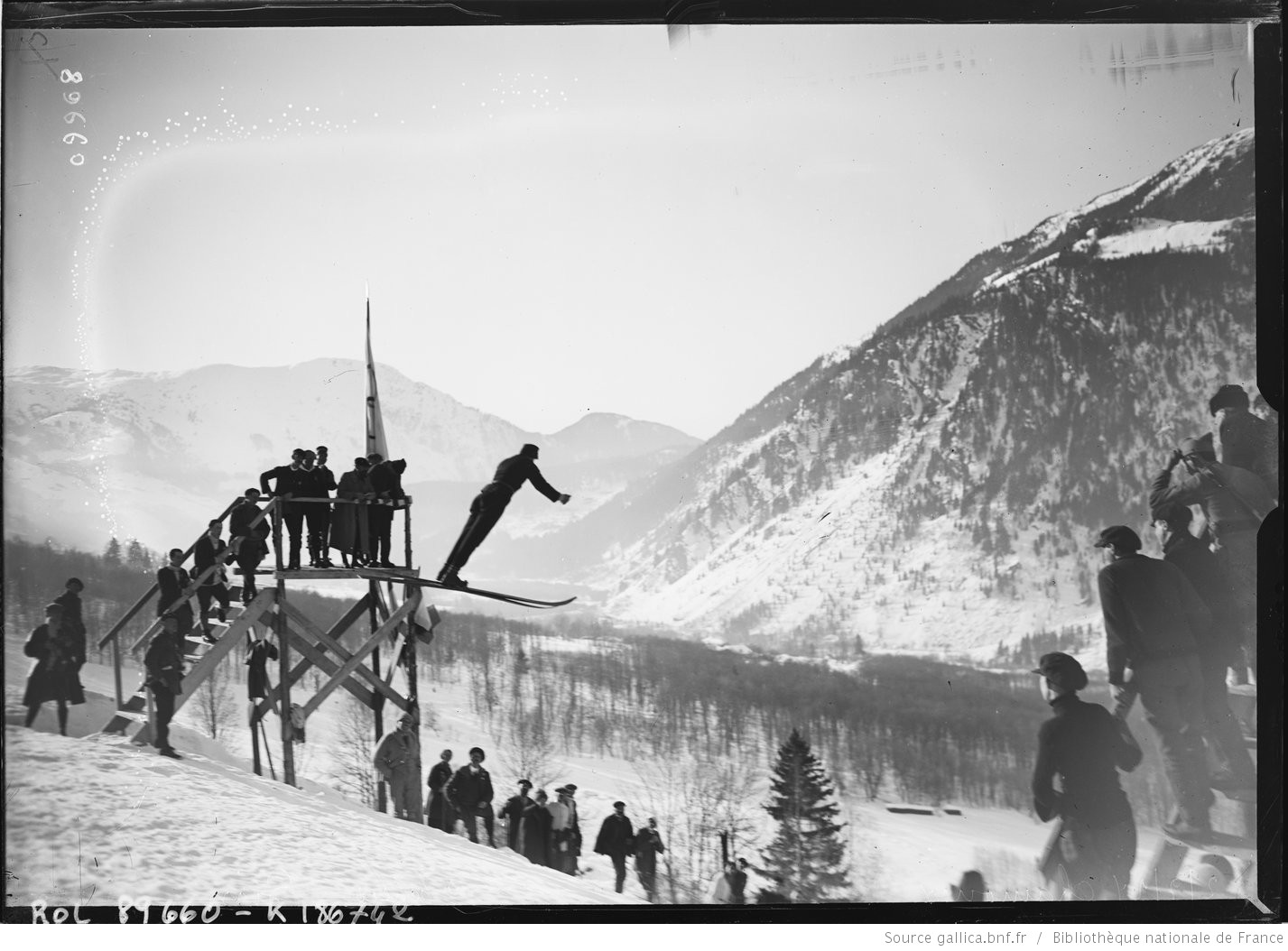

Personal information
- Born: 24 January 1901 Vysoké nad Jizerou, Austria-Hungary
- Died: 5 September 1934 (aged 33)

Sport
- Sport: Skiing
Medal record
Representing Czechoslovakia

Josef Bím (24 January 1901 – 5 September 1934) was a Czechoslovak soldier and skier.

== Early life ==
Bím was born in Vysoké nad Jizerou.

== Career ==
He was a member of the national Olympic military patrol team in 1924 which placed fourth. Furthermore he finished 13th at the Nordic combined event and 26th at the ski jumping competition.

He also took part at the FIS Nordic World Ski Championships 1925 and 1926, where he finished 5th at the Nordic combined event in 1925 and 23rd in 1926. At ski jumping he failed in 1926.

In 1928 he placed 20th at the ski jumping event of the Winter Olympics.
