= Stanisław Gąsienica Sieczka =

Polish ski jumper

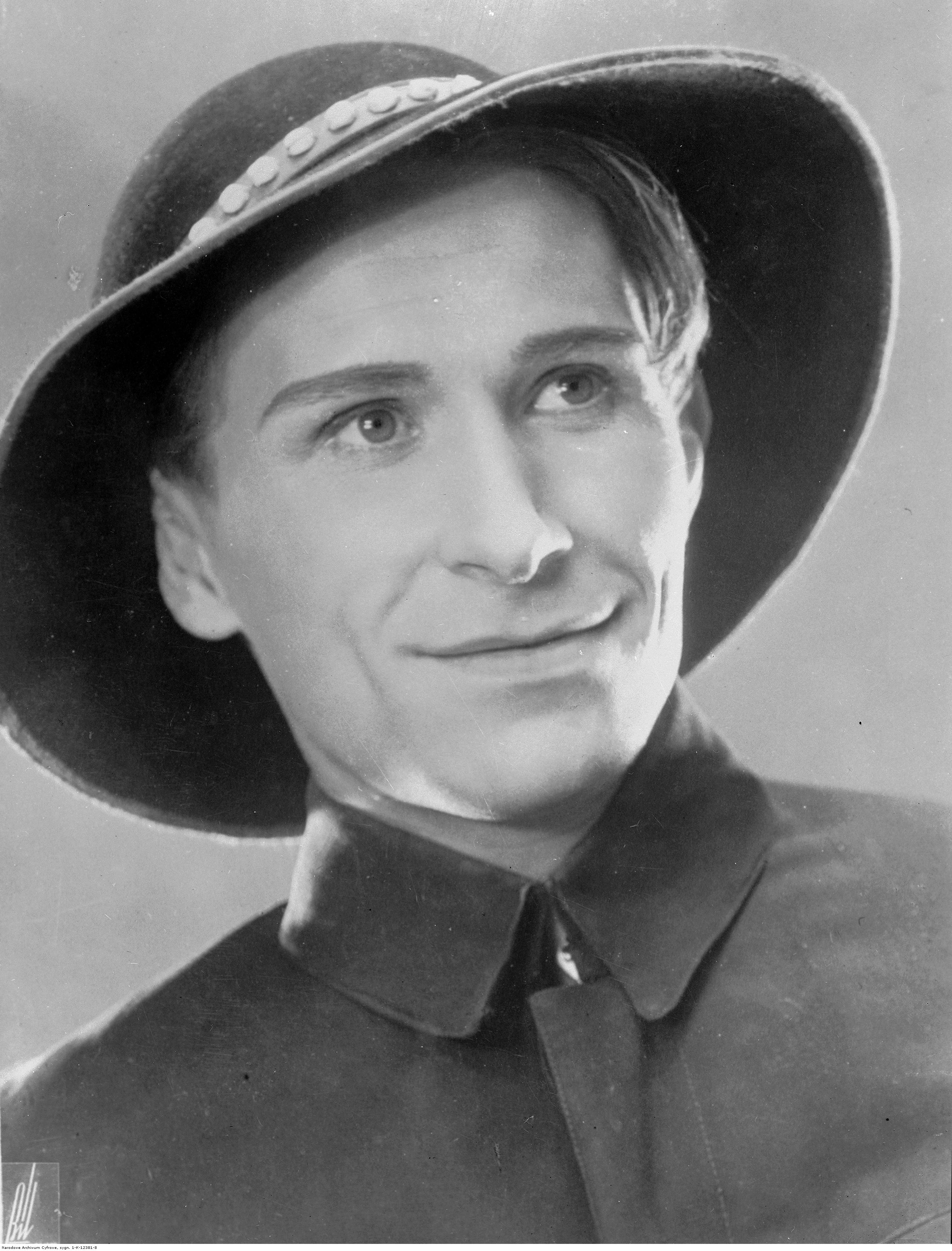

Personal information
- Nationality: Polish
- Born: 24 October 1904; Zakopane, Poland
- Died: 10 October 1975 (aged 70); Zakopane, Poland

Sport
- Sport: Ski jumping

Stanisław Gąsienica Sieczka (24 October 1904 – 10 October 1975) was a Polish ski jumper. He competed in the individual event at the 1928 Winter Olympics.
