= Karl Wondrak (ski jumper) =

Czech ski jumper

Personal information
- Nationality: Czech

Sport
- Sport: Ski jumping

Karl Wondrak was a Czech ski jumper. He competed in the individual event at the 1928 Winter Olympics.
