= Alois Kratzer =

German ski jumper

Alois Kratzer (27 May 1907 – 11 September 1990) was a German ski jumper who competed in the 1928 Winter Olympics at St. Moritz. He was born in Rottach-Egern, Germany.

== Titles ==
- FIS Nordic World Ski Championships 1929 – 4th place on normal hill
- 1928 Winter Olympics – 19th place
