= Wolfgang Dorasil =

Czech ice hockey player

Personal information
- Nationality: Czech
- Born: 7 September 1903; Opava, Austria-Hungary
- Died: 21 March 1964 (aged 60); West Berlin, West Germany

Sport
- Sport: Ice hockey

Wolfgang Robert Karl Adolf Ludwig Ferdinand Maria Dorasil (7 September 1903 – 21 March 1964) was an ethnic German ice hockey player originating from Czechoslovakia. He played domestically for Troppauer EV, a German club based in Opava. Internationally, Dorasil represented Czechoslovakia in both the World and European Championships and also took part in the men's ice hockey tournament at the 1928 Winter Olympics.

Dorasil completed his secondary education at a gymnasium in Opava, demonstrating academic dedication before deciding to further his studies in economics at the polytechnic institute in Munich. However, his time there was cut short after just three semesters when he was expelled due to his participation in Hitler's Beer Hall Putsch in 1923. Following this significant event, Dorasil returned to his hometown of Opava, where he shifted his focus entirely to his passion for ice hockey. Between 1927 and 1932, he became a prominent player on the Czechoslovak national team, earning 38 caps and scoring 10 goals in international competition.

In 1933, he married Erika Reineck, and together they had two sons. Even before the outbreak of World War II, Dorasil was involved with German nationalist groups, first joining the DNSAP and later becoming a member of the NSKK and NSDAP. After the war ended, he was arrested and placed in an internment camp for ethnic Germans, and eventually expelled to Germany. Following his death, by his wishes, his remains were later transferred from Germany back to Opava, where he was laid to rest.
