= Luciano Zampatti =

Italian ski jumper

Personal information
- Nationality: Italian
- Born: 12 May 1903; St. Moritz, Switzerland
- Died: 1 December 1957 (aged 54); Ponte di Legno, Italy

Sport
- Sport: Ski jumping

Luciano Zampatti (12 May 1903 – 1 December 1957) was an Italian ski jumper. He competed in the individual event at the 1928 Winter Olympics. He also finished second in the 1934 Italian ski jumping championships.
