= Jan Krásl =

Czech ice hockey player

- Born: 10 August 1899; Chlumec nad Cidlinou, Austria-Hungary
- Died: 17 March 1980 (aged 80); Prague, Czechoslovakia
- Position: Left wing
- National team: Czechoslovakia
- Playing career: 1923–1933

Johan Josef Krásl (10 August 1899 – 17 March 1980) was a Czech ice hockey player. He competed in the men's tournaments at the 1924 Winter Olympics and the 1928 Winter Olympics.
