= Anselm Knuuttila =

Finnish cross-country skier (1903–1968)

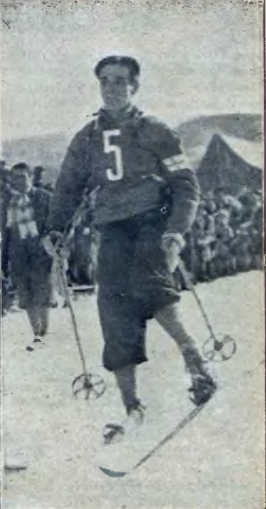

Medal record

Men's cross-country skiing

Representing Finland

World Championships
Gold medal – first place	1929 Zakopane	50 km
Silver medal – second place	1929 Zakopane	17 km

Anselm Knuuttila (February 1, 1903 – June 29, 1968) was a Finnish cross-country skier who competed in the late 1920s. He won a pair of medals at the 1929 FIS Nordic World Ski Championships in Zakopane, earning a gold in the 50 km and a silver in the 17 km event.

== Cross-country skiing results ==
All results are sourced from the International Ski Federation (FIS).

=== World Championships ===
- 2 medals – (1 gold, 1 silver)

Year	Age	17 km	50 km
1929	26	Silver	Gold
