= Ski jumping at the 1924 Winter Olympics =

Ski jumping at the I Olympic Winter Games
- Venue: Le Tremplin Olympique du Mont
- Dates: 4 February 1924
- Competitors: 27 from 9 nations
- Winning Score: 18.960

Medalists
| 1st place, gold medalist(s) | | Jacob Tullin Thams | Norway |
| 2nd place, silver medalist(s) | | Narve Bonna | Norway |
| 3rd place, bronze medalist(s) | | Anders Haugen | United States |

At the 1924 Winter Olympics, one individual ski jumping event was contested. It was held on Monday 4 February 1924.

The event was unusual in that the bronze medalist was not determined for fifty years. Thorleif Haug of Norway was awarded third place at the event's conclusion, but a clerical error in calculating Haug's score was discovered in 1974 by Jacob Vaage, who further determined Anders Haugen of the United States, who had finished fourth, had actually scored 0.095 points more than Haug. The International Olympic Committee verified this, and in Oslo in September 1974, Haug's daughter presented the medal to the 85-year-old Haugen.

== Medalists ==
| Event | Gold | Silver | Bronze |
|---|---|---|---|
| lndividual | Jacob Tullin Thams; Norway | Narve Bonna; Norway | Anders Haugen; United States |

== Results ==
This competition took place at Le Mont with a K-point of 71 meters. The winner of the competition Jacob Tullin Thams also won a silver medal in sailing at the 1936 Summer Olympics; he is among very few athletes to win both Winter and Summer Olympic medals.

| Place | Ski jumper | Total |
|---|---|---|
| 1 | Jacob Tullin Thams (NOR) | 18.960 |
| 2 | Narve Bonna (NOR) | 18.688 |
| 3 | Anders Haugen (USA) | 17.917 |
| 4 | Thorleif Haug (NOR) | 17.819 |
| 5 | Einar Landvik (NOR) | 17.521 |
| 6 | Axel-Herman Nilsson (SWE) | 17.146 |
| 7 | Menotti Jakobsson (SWE) | 17.083 |
| 8 | Alexandre Girard-Bille (SUI) | 16.793 |
| 9 | Nils Lindh (SWE) | 16.737 |
| 10 | Franz Wende (TCH) | 16.480 |
| 11 | Sulo Jääskeläinen (FIN) | 16.418 |
| 12 | Nils Sundh (SWE) | 16.397 |
| 13 | Tuure Nieminen (FIN) | 16.262 |
| 14 | Lemoine Batson (USA) | 16.200 |
| 15 | Klébert Balmat (FRA) | 15.500 |
| 16 | Harry Lien (USA) | 14.917 |
| 17 | Luigi Faure (ITA) | 14.010 |
| 18 | Peter Schmid (SUI) | 13.437 |
| 19 | Mario Cavalla (ITA) | 12.605 |
| 20 | Karel Koldovský (TCH) | 12.501 |
| 21 | Andrzej Krzeptowski (POL) | 12.458 |
| 22 | Gilbert Ravanel (FRA) | 12.397 |
| 23 | Hans Eidenbenz (SUI) | 10.313 |
| 24 | Xaver Affentranger (SUI) | 7.813 |
| 25 | Martial Payot (FRA) | 7.355 |
| 26 | Josef Bím (TCH) | 2.333 |
| — | Louis Albert (FRA) | DNF |

== Participating nations ==
A total of 27 ski jumpers from nine nations competed at the Chamonix Games:

- Czechoslovakia (3)
- Finland (2)
- France (4)
- Italy (2)
- Norway (4)
- Poland (1)
- Sweden (4)
- Switzerland (4)
- United States (3)
