= Erwin Lichnofsky =

Czech ice hockey player

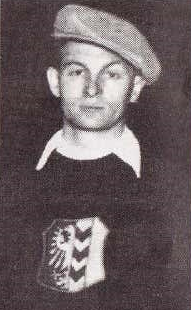

Personal information
- Full name: Erwin Wilhelm Maria Lichnofsky
- Nationality: Czech
- Born: 6 August 1903 Opava, Austria-Hungary
- Died: 25 February 1974 (aged 70) Munich, West Germany

Sport
- Country: Czechoslovakia
- Sport: Ice hockey

Erwin Wilhelm Maria Lichnofsky (6 August 1903 – 25 February 1974), sometimes referred to as Johann Lichnovsky or Johann Lichnowski, was a Czech ice hockey player. He competed for Czechoslovakia in the men's tournament at the 1928 Winter Olympics.
