= Vysoké nad Jizerou =

- Town
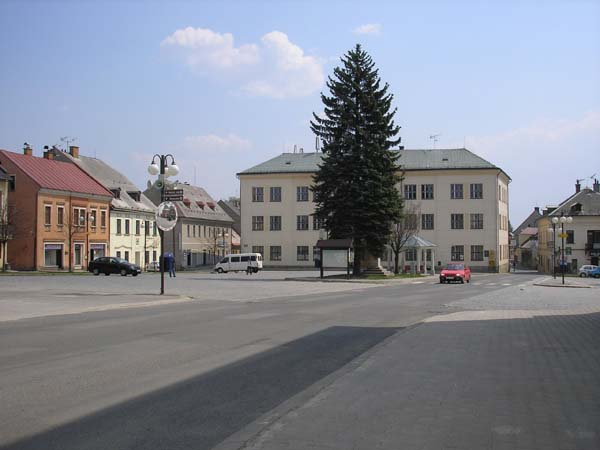
- Town square

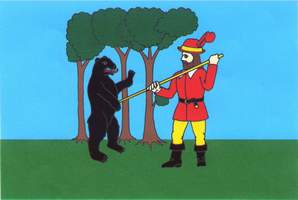
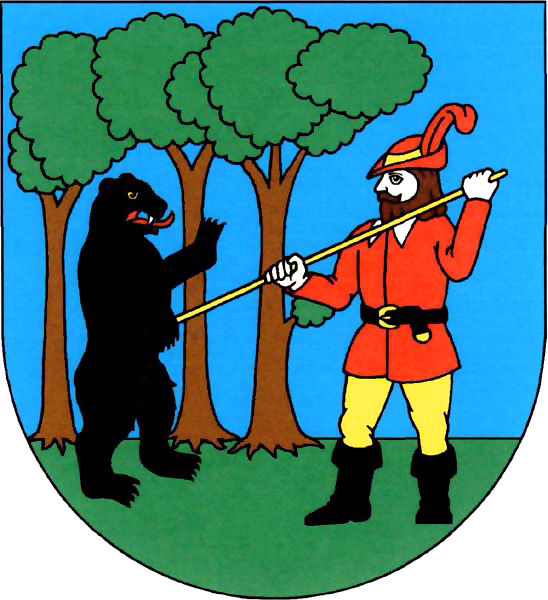
- Flag Coat of arms

- Location in the Czech Republic
- Coordinates: 50°41′8″N 15°24′6″E
- Country: Czech Republic
- Region: Liberec
- District: Semily
- First mentioned: 1352

Government
  - Mayor: Lucie Strnádková

Area
  - Total: 20.67 km^{2} (7.98 sq mi)
- Elevation: 692 m (2,270 ft)

Population (2026-01-01)
  - Total: 1,263
  - Density: 61.10/km^{2} (158.3/sq mi)
- Time zone: UTC+1 (CET)
  - Summer (DST): UTC+2 (CEST)
- Postal codes: 512 11, 512 43, 513 01
- Website: www.vysokenadjizerou.cz

Vysoké nad Jizerou (Czech pronunciation: [ˈvɪsokɛː ˈnad jɪzɛrou]; German: Hochstadt an der Iser) is a town in Semily District in the Liberec Region of the Czech Republic. It has about 1,300 inhabitants.

== Administrative division ==
Vysoké nad Jizerou consists of five municipal parts (in brackets population according to the 2021 census):

- Vysoké nad Jizerou (819)
- Helkovice (36)
- Horní Tříč (131)
- Sklenařice (178)
- Stará Ves (56)

== Etymology ==
The Czech word vysoké means 'high'. The settlement was named after its location.

== Geography ==
Vysoké nad Jizerou is located about 16 kilometres (10 mi) southeast of Jablonec nad Nisou. It lies in a hilly landscape of the Giant Mountains Foothills. The highest point is the hill Petruškovy vrchy at 720 m (2,362 ft) above sea level.

== History ==
Vysoké was founded in the 14th century. The first written mention of Vysoké is from 1352, and on 4 August 1354 it officially became a town under the Latin name Alta Ciuitas. Glassworks in the town was mentioned in 1377.

The town was conveniently located on the trade routes that gave it importance. The development of Vysoké was hampered by Thirty Years' War, the famine of 1771–1772 and a large fire in 1834 that destroyed almost all wooden buildings.

== Demographics ==
Historical population

| Year | Pop. | ±% |
|---|---|---|
| 1869 | 3,838 | — |
| 1880 | 3,878 | +1.0% |
| 1890 | 3,993 | +3.0% |
| 1900 | 3,744 | −6.2% |
| 1910 | 3,661 | −2.2% |

| Year | Pop. | ±% |
|---|---|---|
| 1921 | 3,193 | −12.8% |
| 1930 | 3,099 | −2.9% |
| 1950 | 2,328 | −24.9% |
| 1961 | 1,734 | −25.5% |
| 1970 | 1,676 | −3.3% |

| Year | Pop. | ±% |
|---|---|---|
| 1980 | 1,508 | −10.0% |
| 1991 | 1,417 | −6.0% |
| 2001 | 1,353 | −4.5% |
| 2011 | 1,292 | −4.5% |
| 2021 | 1,220 | −5.6% |

Source: Censuses

== Transport ==
There are no railways or major roads passing through the municipal territory.

== Sport ==
Vysoké nad Jizerou is known as a ski resort. There are two ski areas called Větrov and Šachty.

== Sights ==
The main landmark of Vysoké nad Jizerou is the Church of Saint Catherine of Alexandria. It was built in the Baroque style in 1725–1734.

Vysoké nad Jizerou is home to the Krakonoš Museum, which deals with the mythology surrounding Krakonoš.

=== Nístějka Castle ===
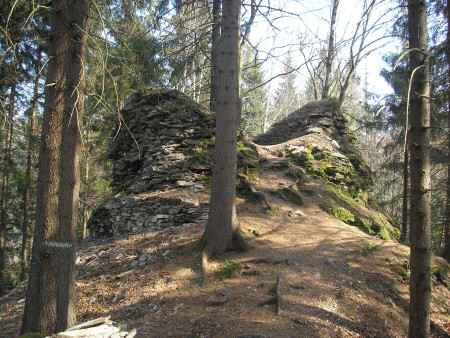
One of the remaining parts of Nístějka

Nístějka is a ruin of a castle in Vysoké nad Jizerou founded probably in the 14th century by the Waldstein family. In 1390, it was acquired together with the settlement of Vysoké by the Vartemberk family and in 1422 by the Jenštejn family. Around 1460, the castle was briefly held by King George of Poděbrady and his goods were attached to Návarov. Since 1519, the castle has been declared desolate, probably after a previous fire.

The ruins consists of remnants of towers, walls and cellars on a narrow, long promontory over the Jizera river near Hradsko. The castle consisted of an elongated barracks protected by a moat and a cylindrical tower at its head, and a small inner castle where only a backyard with a tank and a rectangular palace was on the rocks.

The castle is declared a nature monument for the occurrence of the herb Hackelia deflexa. In 1954, 1958 and 1972, archaeological research of the castle was carried out.

== Notable people ==
- Karel Kramář (1867–1930), politician
- Josef Bím (1901–1934), soldier and skier
- Dalibor Motejlek (born 1942), ski jumper
