= Jaroslav Pušbauer =

Czech ice hockey player

Jaroslav Pušbauer (31 July 1901 – 6 June 1974) was a Czechoslovak ice hockey player who competed in the 1928 Winter Olympics and in the 1936 Winter Olympics. In 1928, he participated with the Czechoslovak team in the Olympic tournament. Eight years later, he was also a member of the Czechoslovak team which finished fourth in the 1936 Olympic tournament. He was born and died in Prague.
