= Bruno Trojani =

Swiss ski jumper

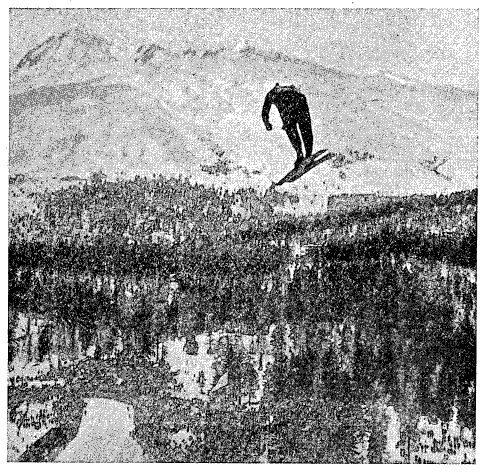
- Bruno Trojani in 1928

Personal information
- Nationality: Swiss
- Born: 29 August 1907
- Died: 14 January 1966 (aged 58)

Sport
- Sport: Ski jumping

Bruno Trojani (29 August 1907 – 14 January 1966) was a Swiss ski jumper. He competed in the individual event at the 1928 Winter Olympics.
