= Jacob Tullin Thams =

Norwegian sportsman

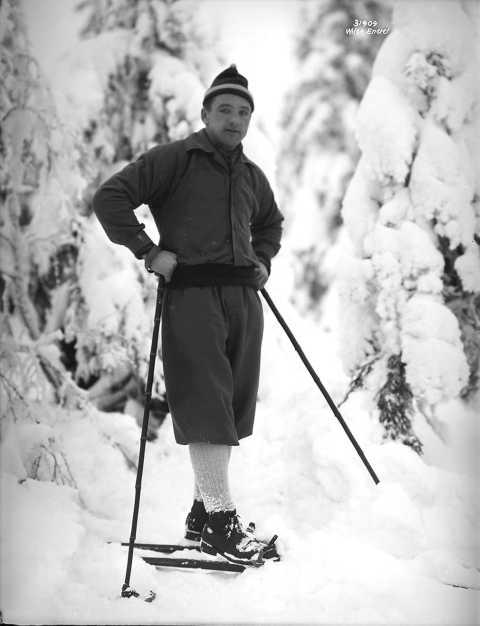
- Jacob Tullin Thams in 1928

Personal information
- Nationality: Norway
- Born: 7 April 1898 Krisitiania, Sweden-Norway
- Died: 27 July 1954 (aged 56) Oslo, Norway
- Height: 178 cm (5 ft 10 in)

Sport
- Sport: Ski jumping, Sailing
- Club: IF Ready
Medal record
Men's ski jumping
Representing Norway
Winter Olympic Games
Gold medal – first place	1924 Chamonix	Individual LH
World Championships
Gold medal – first place	1924 Chamonix	Individual LH
Gold medal – first place	1926 Lahti	Individual large hill
Men's sailing
Summer Olympic Games
Silver medal – second place	1936 Berlin	8-metre

Jacob Tullin "Tulla" Thams (7 April 1898 – 27 July 1954) was a Norwegian Olympian, who competed in ski jumping and sailing.

== Career ==
He won the first Olympic ski jumping gold medal in 1924, and became the third person (after Gillis Grafström who competed in one sport only and boxer/bobsleigh crew member Eddie Eagan) to medal in both the Winter and Summer Olympics in 1936 as a member of the silver medal-winning Norwegian 8-metre sailing team.

Thams also won the individual large hill at the 1926 FIS Nordic World Ski Championships in Lahti, earned the Holmenkollen medal in 1926 (the first true ski jumper to do so), and would develop the Kongsberger technique in ski jumping (along with fellow Norwegian Sigmund Ruud) that would be the standard until it was superseded by the Daescher technique in the 1950s. Thams is one of the few athletes who have competed in both the Summer and Winter Olympic games.

== Ski jumping world records ==
Date	Hill	Location	Metres	Feet
18 February 1928	Olympiaschanze	St. Moritz, Switzerland	73	240

Not recognized! Crash at world record distance.
