= Gérard Vuilleumier =

Swiss ski jumper

Personal information
- Nationality: Swiss
- Born: 5 December 1905; La Chaux-de-Fonds, Switzerland
- Died: 17 April 1984 (aged 78); Genève, Switzerland

Sport
- Sport: Ski jumping

Gérard Vuilleumier (5 December 1905 – 17 April 1984) was a Swiss ski jumper and cyclist. He competed in the individual event at the 1928 Winter Olympics.

== Ski jumping ==
Vuilleumier was part of the national team at the 1928 Winter Olympics in St. Moritz. When jumping from the normal hill, he landed in the first round at 57.5 meters (189 ft). In the second round he improved to 62 meters (203 ft), but fell and therefore did not get past 30th place.

== Cycling ==
In addition to his winter sports career, Vuilleumier was a successful cyclist in summer. For the 1928 Summer Olympics, he was registered as a participant in the road bike race, but did not take part. In the same year he won the Bern-Genève road race as an amateur. A little later, in 1929, after a third place in the amateur class at the Swiss road championships, he turned professional. A year later he secured a bronze medal in the professional championship. In 1931 he won Bern-Genève in the Pro category. At the Tour de Suisse in 1933, he finished 34th.
