= FIS Nordic World Ski Championships 1929 =

International Nordic skiing competition

- Host city: Zakopane
- Country: Poland
- Events: 4
- Opening: 5 February 1929
- Closing: 9 February 1929

The FIS Nordic World Ski Championships 1929 took place February 5–9, 1929 in Zakopane, Poland.

== Men's cross country ==
=== 17 km ===
February 7, 1929

Medal	Athlete	Time
Gold	Veli Saarinen (FIN)	1:20:03
Silver	Anselm Knuuttila (FIN)	1:20:40
Bronze	Hjalmar Bergström (SWE)	1:21:28

=== 50 km ===
February 9, 1929

Medal	Athlete	Time
Gold	Anselm Knuuttila (FIN)	3:50:01
Silver	Veli Saarinen (FIN)	3:53:23
Bronze	Olle Hansson (SWE)	3:53:30

== Men's Nordic combined ==
=== Individual ===
February 5, 1929

Medal	Athlete	Points
Gold	Hans Vinjarengen (NOR)	452.10
Silver	Ole Stenen (NOR)	432.65
Bronze	Esko Järvinen (FIN)	431.70

== Men's ski jumping ==
=== Individual large hill ===
February 5, 1929

Medal	Athlete	Points
Gold	Sigmund Ruud (NOR)	227.2
Silver	Kristian Johansson (NOR)	225.2
Bronze	Hans Kleppen (NOR)	223.8

== Medal table ==
Rank	Nation	Gold	Silver	Bronze	Total
1	Finland (FIN)	2	2	1	5
1	Norway (NOR)	2	2	1	5
3	Sweden (SWE)	0	0	2	2
Totals (3 entries)		4	4	4	12

== See also ==
- Ski jumping at the FIS Nordic World Ski Championships 1929
