= Kristian Johansson =

Norwegian ski jumper

Medal record

Men's ski jumping

Representing Norway

World Championships
Gold medal – first place	1934 Sollefteå	Individual large hill
Silver medal – second place	1929 Zakopane	Individual large hill

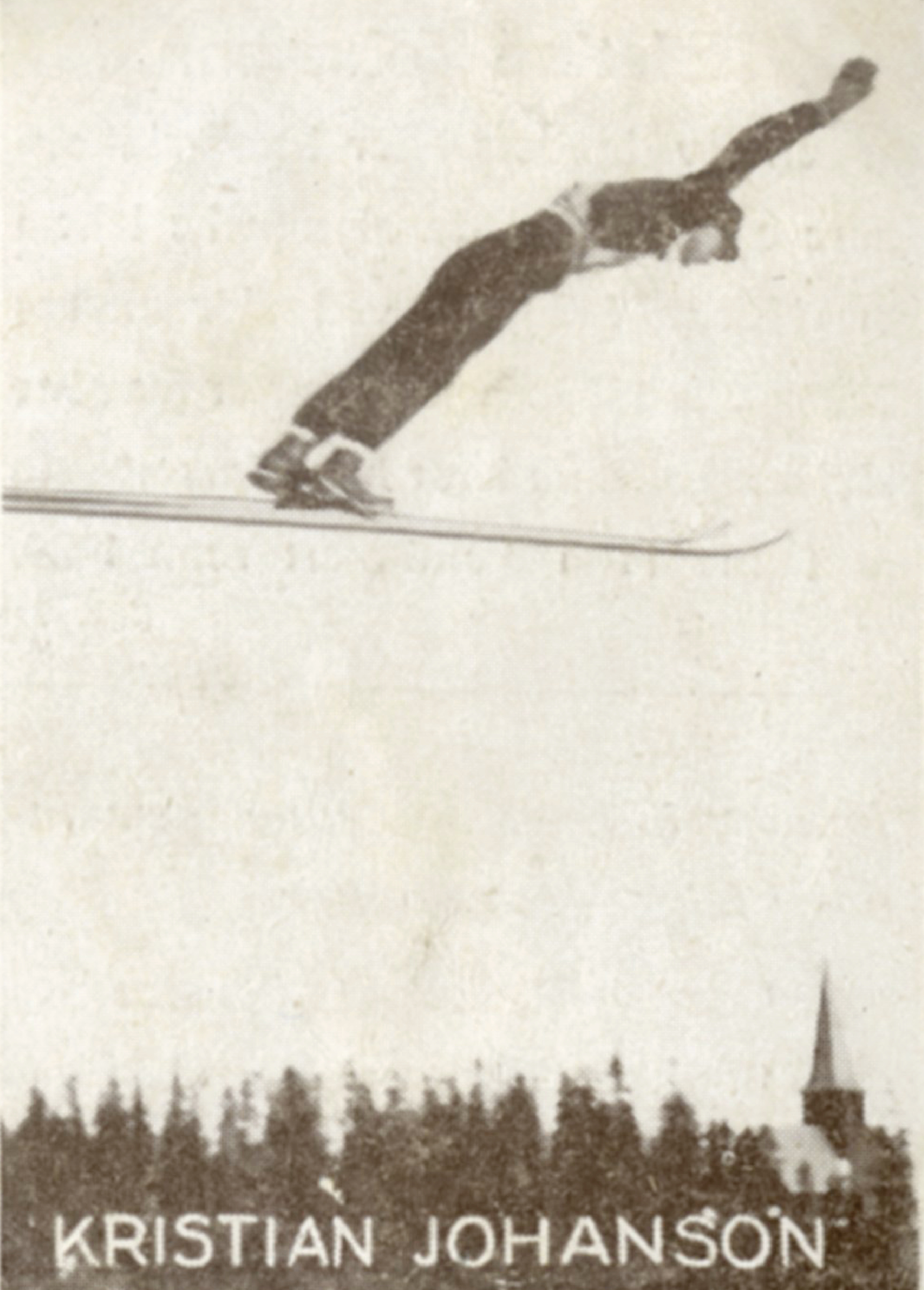

Kristian Johannson (25 December 1907 – 9 March 1984) was a Norwegian ski jumper who competed in the late 1920s and early 1930s. He won two ski jumping medals at the FIS Nordic World Ski Championships with one gold (1934) and one silver 1929.
