= Alf Andersen (ski jumper) =

Norwegian ski jumper (1906–1975)

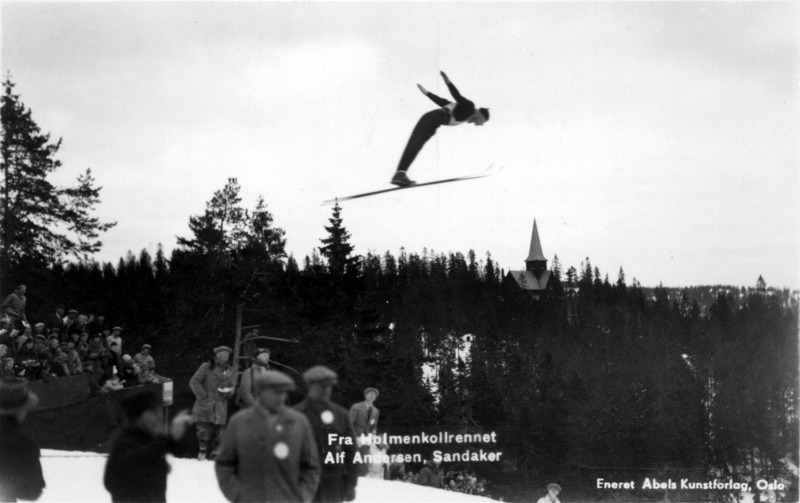

Medal record

Men's ski jumping

Representing Norway

Olympic Games
Gold medal – first place	1928 St. Moritz	Individual large hill

World Championships
Gold medal – first place	1928 St. Moritz	Individual large hill
Bronze medal – third place	1935 Vysoké Tatry	Individual large hill

Alf Steen Andersen (15 May 1906 – 12 April 1975) was a Norwegian ski jumper. He was born in Drammen, but represented the Oslo clubs Sandaker, Skeid and Lyn. He won the gold medal in the individual large hill at the 1928 Winter Olympics in St. Moritz. He also won a bronze medal in the individual large hill at the 1935 FIS Nordic World Ski Championships in Vysoké Tatry.

He died in 1975 in Frogn.
