= Tore Edman =

Swedish ski jumper

Medal record

Men's ski jumping

Representing Sweden

World Championships
Gold medal – first place	1927 Cortina d'Ampezzo	Individual large hill

Tore Edman (July 25, 1904 – June 16, 1995) was a Swedish ski jumper who competed in the 1920s. He won a gold medal in the individual large hill at the 1927 FIS Nordic World Ski Championships in Cortina d'Ampezzo. He was born in Arvika.
