= Willy Möhwald =

Czech ski jumper

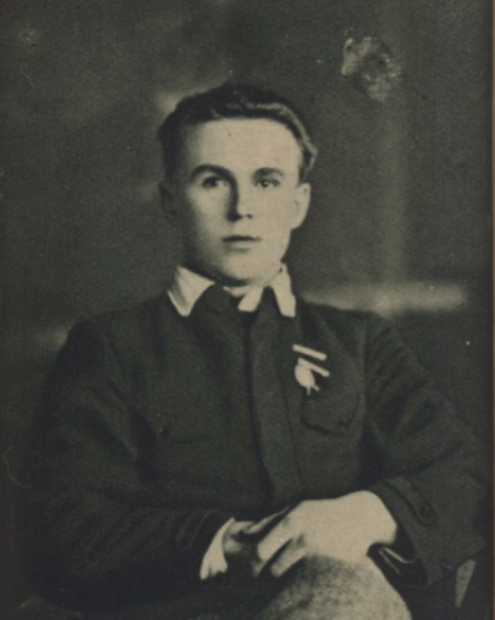

Personal information
- Nationality: Czech
- Born: 1 September 1908; Herlikovice, Austria-Hungary
- Died: 15 May 1975 (aged 66); Gauting, West Germany

Sport
- Sport: Ski jumping

Willy Möhwald (1 September 1908 – 15 May 1975) was a Czech ski jumper. He competed in the individual event at the 1928 Winter Olympics.
