= Franz Thannheimer =

German ski jumper

Franz Thannheimer (7 April 1904 – 27 June 1971) was a German ski jumper who competed in the 1928 Winter Olympics.
