= Rudolf Burkert =

Czechoslovak skier

Medal record

Representing Czechoslovakia

Men's Nordic combined

World Championships
Gold medal – first place	1927 Cortina d'Ampezzo	Individual

Men's ski jumping

Olympic Games
Bronze medal – third place	1928 St. Moritz	Individual large hill

World Championships
Silver medal – second place	1933 Innsbruck	Individual large hill
Bronze medal – third place	1928 St. Moritz	Individual large hill

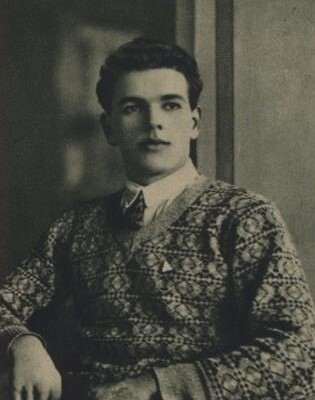
Burkert

Rudolf Burkert (31 October 1904 – 7 June 1985) was an ethnic German Czechoslovak Nordic skier who competed in the 1920s and 1930s. He won a bronze medal in the ski jumping individual large hill competition at the 1928 Winter Olympics in St. Moritz, the first Winter Olympics medal in Czechoslovak history. He also finished 12th in the Nordic combined event at those Olympics.

Burkert won two medals in the FIS Nordic World Ski Championships, earning a Nordic combined gold in 1927 and a ski jumping silver in 1933.

He was born in Polubný, Kořenov, Bohemia. In 1968 he emigrated to West Germany, where he died in 1985.
