= Hans Kleppen =

Norwegian ski jumper (1907–2009)

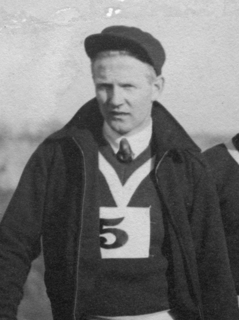

Medal record

Men's ski jumping

Representing Norway

World Championships
Bronze medal – third place	1929 Zakopane	Individual large hill

Hans Kleppen (16 March 1907 – 12 April 2009) was a Norwegian ski jumper who competed in the late 1920s. He won a bronze medal on the individual large hill competition at the 1929 FIS Nordic World Ski Championships in Zakopane.

Kleppen was born in Bø Municipality in March 1907. He turned 100 in March 2007 and, having participated in the 1928 Winter Olympics, was Norway's oldest living Olympian.
