= Renfroe =

Surname

Renfroe is a surname of Scottish origin, and a variant of Renfrew. Notable people with the surname include:

- Anita Renfroe (born 1962), American Christian comedian from Atlanta, Georgia, the wife of a Baptist pastor
- Earl W. Renfroe (1907–2000), innovator in the field of orthodontics and in breaking down the barriers of racism
- Gilbert Renfroe (born 1963), former professional football quarterback
- Hunter Renfroe (born 1992), baseball player
- Laddie Renfroe, former Major League Baseball pitcher
- Marshall Renfroe (1936–1970), Major League Baseball pitcher
- Moses Renfroe, one of a group of settlers who arrived in middle Tennessee in 1780 with James Robertson, the founder of Nashville
- Owen Renfroe, American television soap opera director and former editor
- Scott Renfroe (born 1966), legislator in the U.S. state of Colorado

== See also ==
- Renfro (disambiguation)
  - Renfro (surname)
- Renfrow (disambiguation)
  - Renfrow (surname)
- Renfrew (disambiguation)
