= Renfrew (disambiguation) =

Renfrew is a town in Scotland.

Renfrew may also refer to:

== Places ==
=== Canada ===
- Renfrew, Calgary, a neighbourhood in Alberta
- Renfrew, Nova Scotia
- Renfrew, Ontario
- Renfrew County, Ontario
- Renfrew station, a Skytrain station in Vancouver
- Renfrew-Collingwood, a neighborhood in Vancouver, British Columbia
- Port Renfrew, British Columbia, Vancouver Island

=== Scotland ===
- Renfrew (district), a former district of Strathclyde
- Renfrew (Parliament of Scotland constituency), pre-1707
- Renfrewshire, the council area in which Renfrew is situated
- Renfrewshire (historic), an historic county of Scotland

=== United States ===
- Renfrew, Pennsylvania

== People with the surname ==
- Catherine Easton Renfrew (died 2002), British speech therapist
- Charles Byron Renfrew (1928–2017), American judge
- Colin Renfrew (born 1937), Baron Renfrew of Kaimsthorn, British archeologist
- Malcolm Renfrew (1910–2013), American polymer chemist, inventor, and professor
- Mary Renfrew (born 1955), British professor of midwifery
- Stewart Renfrew, Scottish footballer

== Other uses ==
- Renfrew of the Royal Mounted, a fictional Canadian law-enforcement officer in radio and print stories
- Holt Renfrew, a Canadian luxury goods retailer

== See also ==
- Baron Renfrew (disambiguation)
