= 2022 Birthday Honours =

British government recognitions

The 2022 Queen's Birthday Honours are appointments by some of the 15 Commonwealth realms of Queen Elizabeth II to various orders and honours to reward and highlight good works by citizens of those countries. The Birthday Honours are awarded as part of the Queen's Official Birthday celebrations during the month of June. They were announced on 1 June 2022, in anticipation of the Queen's Platinum Jubilee. They were the last honours granted by the Queen before her death on 8 September 2022.

== United Kingdom ==
Below are the individuals appointed by Elizabeth II in her right as Queen of the United Kingdom with honours within her own gift, and with the advice of the Government for other honours.

=== Order of the Companions of Honour ===
==== Member of the Order of Companions of Honour (CH) ====
- Sir Quentin Blake, CBE. Illustrator and Writer. For services to Illustration.
- Sir Salman Rushdie. Author. For services to Literature.
- Dame Marina Warner, DBE. Professor of English and Creative Writing, Birkbeck College, University of London and Distinguished Fellow, All Souls College, University of Oxford. For services to the Humanities.

=== Knight Bachelor ===
Knight Bachelor ribbon

- Professor Michael James Paul Arthur. Lately Provost and President, University College London. For services to Higher Education.
- Nigel Patrick Gray Boardman. Lately Partner, Slaughter and May. For services to the Legal Profession.
- Professor Peter George Bruce, FRS FRSE. Wolfson Chair, Professor of Materials, University of Oxford. For services to Science and Innovation.
- Nicholas David Coleridge, CBE. Chairman, Victoria and Albert Museum. For services to Museums, to Publishing and to the Creative Industries.
- Bradley Fried. Chair, Court of the Bank of England. For Public Service.
- Dr. Andrew Francis Goddard. President, Royal College of Physicians. For services to Health and Social Care.
- Julian Matthew Frederick Hartley. Chief Executive, Leeds Teaching Hospitals NHS Trust. For services to Healthcare.
- Stephen Andrew Gill Hough, CBE. Pianist. For services to Music.
- Isaac Julien, CBE. Artist and Film Maker. For services to Diversity and Inclusion in Art.
- Rohinton Minoo Kalifa, OBE. Chair, Network International. For services to Financial Services, to Technology and to Public Service.
- Iain Thomas Livingstone, QPM. Chief Constable, Police Service of Scotland. For services to Policing and the Public.
- Dr. James Smith Milne, CBE, DL. Chairman and managing director, Balmoral Group. For services to Business and to Charity.
- Martyn Ellis Oliver. Chief Executive Officer, Outwood Grange Academies Trust. For services to Education.
- Dr. Paul Lasseter Phillips, CBE. Principal and Chief Executive, Weston College, North Somerset. For services to Further Education.
- Professor Stephen Huw Powis. National Medical Director, NHS England and NHS Improvement. For services to the NHS, particularly during COVID-19.
- Ian Rankin, OBE, DL. Author. For services to Literature and to Charity.
- Professor Aziz Sheikh, OBE, FRSE. Chair, Primary Care Research and Development, University of Edinburgh. For services to COVID-19 Research and Policy.
- Pascal Claude Roland Soriot. Chief Executive Officer, AstraZeneca plc. For services to UK Life Sciences and the Response to COVID-19.
- The Right Honourable Stephen Creswell Timms, MP. Member of Parliament for East Ham. For Political and Public Service.
- James Nicol Walker, CBE. Joint Managing Director, Walkers Shortbread Limited. For services to the Food Industry.
- The Right Honourable Jeremy Paul Wright, QC, MP. Member of Parliament for Kenilworth and Southam. For Political and Public Service.

Overseas and International List

- Professor David William Cross MacMillan, FRS FRSE, Professor of Chemistry, Princeton University, USA. For services to Chemistry and Science.

Crown Dependencies
Jersey

- Timothy John Le Cocq. For services to the Community as Bailiff of the Bailiwick of Jersey.

=== Order of the Bath ===
Order of the Bath ribbon

==== Knight/Dame Commander of the Order of the Bath (KCB/DCB) ====
Military

- Lieutenant General Ralph Wooddisse, CBE, MC
- Air Marshal Richard Knighton, CB

Civil

- Bernadette Mary Kelly, CB. Permanent Secretary, Department for Transport. For services to Government.
- Charles Fergusson Roxburgh. Second Permanent Secretary, H.M. Treasury. For services to Government.

==== Companion of the Order of the Bath (CB) ====
Military

- Rear Admiral Simon Phillip Asquith, OBE
- Rear Admiral Iain Stuart Lower
- Major General Andrew Michael Roe
- Major General Alexander Taylor
- Air Vice-Marshal (The Venerable) John Raymond Ellis, QHC
- Air Vice-Marshal Lincoln Scott Taylor, OBE
- Air Vice-Marshal Garry Tunnicliffe, CVO

Civil

- Stephen Thomas Braviner Roman. Director General Legal, Government Legal Department. For services to the Law.
- Penelope Kamilla Ciniewicz. Director General, Customer Compliance, H. M. Revenue and Customs. For services to Public Administration.
- Stephen Brian Field. Director, Climate, Environment and Energy, H. M. Treasury. For services to Climate Finance.
- Edward Allen Humpherson. Director General for Regulation, UK Statistics Authority. For Public Service.
- Clare Lombardelli. Chief Economic Adviser, H.M. Treasury. For Public Service.
- Tracy Meharg. Lately Permanent Secretary, Department for Communities, Northern Ireland Executive. For Public Service.
- Jonathan Mills. Director General, Labour Market Policy and Implementation, Department for Work and Pensions. For services to Labour Market Policy and Strategy.

=== Order of St Michael and St George ===
Order of St Michael and St George ribbon

==== Knight Grand Cross of the Order of St Michael and St George (GCMG) ====
- Sir Iain MacLeod, KCMG. Lately Legal Adviser, Foreign, Commonwealth and Development Office. For services to the International Rule of Law and to Legal Services across HM Government.

==== Knight Commander of the Order of St Michael and St George (KCMG) ====
- Dr. Robin Niblett, CMG. Director, Chatham House, the Royal Institute of International Affairs. For services to International Relations and to British Foreign Policy.
- The Honourable Anthony Smellie, QC. Chief Justice, the Cayman Islands. For services to Law and Justice in the Cayman Islands and the Caribbean.
- Professor David Warrell. Emeritus Professor of Tropical Medicine, University of Oxford. For services to global Health Research and Clinical Practice.

==== Companion of the Order of St Michael and St George (CMG) ====
- Nicholas Bridge. Foreign Secretary's Special Representative for Climate Change, Foreign Commonwealth and Development Office. For services to tackling global Climate Change.
- Velavan Gnanendran. Director, Climate, Energy and Environment, Foreign, Commonwealth and Development Office. For services to UK Climate, Development and Environmental policy.
- Adrian Jowett. Director, Foreign, Commonwealth and Development Office. For services to British Foreign Policy.
- Dr. Martin Longden, OBE. Lately Chargé d'Affaires ad Interim, UK Mission to Afghanistan, Doha. For services to British Foreign Policy.
- Nicholas O’Donohoe. Chief Executive, British International Investment. For services to global Impact Investment.
- Jonathan Powell. Director, Foreign, Commonwealth and Development Office. For services to British Foreign Policy.
- Paul Symington. Lately Chairman of Symington Family Estates and John E Fells & Sons. For services to UK/Portugal relations and Social and Environmental Sustainability in the Douro region of Portugal.
- Nigel Topping. UK High-Level Climate Action Champion for the United Nations Climate Change Conference of the Parties (COP26). For services to tackling global Climate Change and supporting the UK Presidency of the 2021 UN Climate Change Conference.
- Archibald Young. Lead Negotiator for the UK Presidency of the United Nations Climate Change Conference of the Parties (COP26), The Cabinet Office. For services to tackling global Climate Change and supporting the UK Presidency of the 2021 UN Climate Change Conference.

=== Royal Victorian Order ===
Royal Victorian Order ribbon

==== Knight Grand Cross of the Royal Victorian Order (GCVO) ====
- Edward Fitzalan-Howard, 18th Duke of Norfolk, DL. Earl Marshal.

==== Knight/Dame Commander of the Royal Victorian Order (KCVO / DCVO) ====
- Susan Elizabeth Pyper. Lord-Lieutenant of West Sussex.
- Clive Alderton, CVO. Principal Private Secretary to The Prince of Wales and The Duchess of Cornwall.
- Ashok Jivraj Rabheru, CVO, DL. Chair, Joint Funding Board, The Duke of Edinburgh's Award.

==== Commander of the Royal Victorian Order (CVO) ====
- Sir Lloyd Dorfman, CBE. Lately Chair, The Prince's Trust International.
- Diane Angela Duke, LVO, DL. Private Secretary and Comptroller to Princess Alexandra, the Honourable Lady Ogilvy.
- Dame Jayne-Anne Gadhia, DBE. Lately Chair, The Prince's Foundation.
- Guy Henderson. Chief Executive, Ascot Racecourse.
- Lieutenant Colonel Patrick Roy Holcroft, LVO, OBE. Lord-Lieutenant of Worcestershire.
- Elizabeth Harriet Bowes-Lyon, LVO. Lady-in-Waiting to The Princess Royal.
- Anne Caroline Maw. Lord-Lieutenant of Somerset.
- Helen Gwenllian Nellis. Lord-Lieutenant of Bedfordshire.
- John Frederick Rufus Warren. Bloodstock and Racing Advisor to The Queen.

==== Lieutenant of the Royal Victorian Order (LVO) ====
- Eric Kenneth James Crawford, MVO. Building Supervisor, Property Section, Royal Household.
- Colonel Duncan Andrew Dewar, OBE. Superintendent, Windsor Castle.
- Paul Colin Duffree. Director of Property, Royal Household.
- Keith Anthony Harrison. Finance Director, Royal Collection.
- Air Vice-Marshal David Anthony Hobart, CB. Lately Gentleman Usher to The Queen.
- Anthony Eugene George Hylton. Lately Chief of Staff and Private Secretary to the Lieutenant-Governor of Ontario, Canada.
- Captain Nigel Lamplough Williams, RN. Lately Secretary, Royal Commission for the Exhibition of 1851.

==== Member of the Royal Victorian Order (MVO) ====
- Paul William Duckett, RVM. Senior Estate Worker, Highgrove.
- Karen Janet Emmerson. Executive Assistant to the Private Secretary to The Earl and Countess of Wessex.
- Christopher Gay, RVM. Senior Palace Attendant, Palace of Holyroodhouse.
- Benjamin Charles Goss, OBE. For services to The Princess Royal.
- Edward Ernest Green, MBE. For services to Nature Conservation, Crown Estate, Windsor.
- Dr. Matthew Simon Evans Hardy. Senior Lecturer in Architecture and Urbanism, The Prince's Foundation for Building Community.
- Michael Graham Hunter. Lately Curator, Osborne House.
- Saranne Elizabeth Malone. Lately Operations Officer, Royal Travel.
- Peter McGowran. Chief Yeoman Warder, H.M. Tower of London.
- Jane McKeown. Head of Finance, Privy Purse & Treasurer's Office, Royal Household.
- Marc O’Shea. Detective Sergeant, Metropolitan Police Service. For services to Royalty and Specialist Protection.
- Tina Marie Pipet. Lately Personal Assistant/Engagements Secretary to the Lieutenant-Governor, Guernsey.
- Michelle Marie Redpath, RVM. Telephone Operator Supervisor, Royal Household.
- Carys Angharad Rees, JP. Senior Research and Project Officer, Household of The Prince of Wales and The Duchess of Cornwall.
- Anna Louise Reynolds. Deputy Surveyor of The Queen's Pictures, Royal Collection.
- Lorraine Rogers. Lately Director, Royal and Diplomatic Affairs, Jaguar Land Rover.
- Carly Anne Rose. Finance Manager, Privy Purse & Treasurer's Office, Royal Household.
- Amy Victoria Stocker. Access and Inclusion Manager, Royal Collection.
- Henrietta Matilda Woodford. Personal Secretary to The Prince of Wales.

Honorary

Jason Clancy. Senior Historic Interiors Conservator, Master of the Household's Department, Royal Household.

=== Royal Victorian Medal (RVM) ===
Royal Victorian Medal ribbon

Gold

- Alan Melton, RVM. Country Park Foreman, Sandringham Estate.

Silver – Bar

- John Paul Fallis, RVM. Warden, Crown Estate, Windsor.
- Bruce David Kearsey, RVM. Tractor Driver, Royal Farms, Windsor

Silver

- James Adam Banham. Carpenter and Joiner, Sandringham Estate.
- Marie Ann Barenskie. Warden, Buckingham Palace, Royal Collection.
- Jean Margaret Calder. Housekeeping Assistant, Birkhall.
- Kenneth Francis Comley. Fencer and Landscape Operative, Crown Estate, Windsor.
- Colin Bryson Coull. Divisional Sergeant Major, The Queen's Body Guard of the Yeomen of the Guard.
- James Ekow Eshun. Palace Attendant, Master of the Household's Department, Royal Household.
- Gary David Flynn. Lately Gamekeeper/Stalker, Balmoral Estate.
- Anne Taylor McCarthy. Housekeeper and Guide, Castle of Mey.
- Malcolm Roberts. Castle Attendant, Master of the Household's Department, Windsor Castle.
- Steven Paul Spong. Team Leader, Machinery and Recycling, Crown Estate, Windsor.
- Andrew Jay Stubbs. Gamekeeper, Crown Estate, Windsor.
- Christopher Phillip Thomas. Staff Co-ordinator, Royal Collection.
- Ross Frederick Wheatley. Ranger, Government House, Perth, Western Australia.

=== Order of the British Empire ===
Civil division ribbon

Military division ribbon

==== Dame Grand Cross of the Order of the British Empire (GBE) ====
Civil

- Dame Susan Elizabeth Ion, DBE. Lately Chair, Nuclear Innovation Research Advisory Board, and Honorary President, National Skills Academy for Nuclear. For services to Engineering.

==== Knight/Dame Commander of the Order of the British Empire (KBE/DBE) ====
Civil

- Dr. Ruth Rosemarie Beverley. Chief Nursing Officer for England, NHS England and NHS Improvement. For services to Nursing, Midwifery, and the NHS.
- The Right Honourable Arlene Foster. Lately First Minister of Northern Ireland. For Political and Public Service.
- Christine Gilbert, CBE. Visiting professor, UCL Institute of Education, chair, Future First and Camden Learning. For services to Young People and to Charity.
- Professor Clare Philomena Grey, FRS. Geoffrey Moorhouse-Gibson and Royal Society Professor of Chemistry, University of Cambridge. For services to Science.
- Nia Rhiannon Griffith, MP. Member of Parliament for Llanelli. For Political and Public Service.
- Fionnuala Mary Jay-O'Boyle, CBE. H.M. Lord-Lieutenant, County Borough of Belfast. For services to the community in Northern Ireland.
- Karen Elisabeth Dind Jones, CBE. For services to Business and to the Hospitality Industry.
- Dr. Ann Geraldine Limb, CBE. Lately Chair, The Scout Association. For services to Young People and to Philanthropy.
- Professor Sally Mapstone, FRSE. Principal and Vice-chancellor, University of St Andrews. For services to Higher Education.
- The Right Honourable Maria Miller, MP. Member of Parliament for Basingstoke. For Parliamentary and Public Service.
- Professor Fiona Magaret Powrie, FRS. Director, Kennedy Institute of Rheumatology. For services to Medical Science.
- Professor Louise Mary Richardson. Vice-chancellor, Oxford University. For services to Higher Education.
- Susan Carroll, The Lady Sainsbury of Turville, CBE. Philanthropist. For services to the Arts, particularly during COVID-19.

==== Commander of the Order of the British Empire (CBE) ====
Military

- Commodore Melanie Robinson, ADC, Royal Naval Reserve
- Brigadier Nigel Christopher Allison
- Brigadier Jonathan Edward Alexander Chestnutt
- Brigadier Angus George Costeker Fair, DSO and Bar, OBE
- Colonel (now Acting Brigadier) Karl Ryan Harris
- Brigadier John Robin Greenwell Stephenson, OBE
- Colonel Nigel Richard Mason Tai
- Air Vice-Marshal Suraya Antonia Marshall
- Air Commodore David Cyril McLoughlin, OBE
- Air Commodore Patrick Keiran O’Donnell, OBE

Civil

- Chief Constable Simon Bailey, QPM, DL. Lately Chief Constable, Norfolk Constabulary. For services to Policing and to Child Protection.
- Sally Jane Balcombe. Chief Executive, VisitBritain. For services to Tourism.
- Clare Victoria Balding, OBE. Broadcaster. For services to Sport and to Charity.
- Richard Michael Barker. Regional Director, NHS England and NHS Improvement, North East and Yorkshire. For services to Healthcare in the North of England.
- Rodney Berkeley. Director, Manufacturing Energy and Infrastructure, Department for International Trade. For services to International Trade and to Diversity and Inclusion.
- Alison Mary Bertlin. Director, Office of the Parliamentary Counsel, Cabinet Office. For Public Service.
- Zoë Ann Billingham. Lately H.M. Inspector, H.M. Inspectorate of Constabulary and Fire and Rescue Services. For Public Service.
- David Wayland Blood. Senior Partner, Generation Investment Management. For services to Climate Finance.
- James Rhys Bowen. Director, International and Economic Security, Department for Digital, Culture, Media and Sport. For Public Service.
- Martin Eugene Joseph Bradley, OBE. For services to Defence Medicine.
- Michael Keith Brodie. Chief Executive, NHS Business Services Authority. For services to Health, particularly during the response to COVID-19.
- Aisling Burnand, MBE. Lately Chief Executive, Association of Medical Research Charities. For services to the Charitable Sector.
- Dr. Thomas Canning, OBE. Chief Executive Officer, The Boleyn Trust and Co-opted Member, East of England and North East London Advisory Board. For services to Education.
- Melissa Case. Lately Director, Family and Criminal Justice Policy, Ministry of Justice, and chair, The Laura Case Trust. For Public and Voluntary Service.
- Una Cleminson, BEM, TD. National Chair, Royal British Legion. For voluntary services to the Royal British Legion and to Veterans.
- Dr. Timothy Coulson. Chief Executive Officer, Unity Schools Partnership and Independent Chair, Norwich Opportunity Area. For services to Education.
- Janet Coyle. Managing Director Business, London and Partners. For services to the Economy.
- Tracey Elizabeth Anne Crouch, MP. Member of Parliament for Chatham and Aylesford. For Parliamentary and Public Service.
- Achilles James Daunt. Founder, Daunt Books and managing director, Waterstones. For services to Publishing.
- Katherine Janet Davies. Chief Executive Officer, Notting Hill Genesis. For services to Housing.
- Geoffrey Nicholas de Bois. Chair, VisitEngland Advisory Board. For services to Tourism and to the Economy.
- Professor James Robert Durrant, FRS. Professor of Photochemistry, Imperial College London and Swansea University. For services to Photochemistry and Solar Energy Research.
- Gwyn Owen Evans. Lately Chief Executive, S4C. For services to Broadcasting in Wales and to the Welsh Language.
- Timothy John Foy, OBE. Lately Director, Home Office and Governor of Anguilla. For Public Service.
- Avnish Mitter Goyal. Chair, Care England. For services to Social Care and to Philanthropy.
- Dr. Julian Francis Grenier. Headteacher, Sheringham Nursery School and Children's Centre. For services to Early Years Education.
- Alun Griffiths, OBE. For services to the Construction Industry and to the community in Wales.
- Nicholas Stewart Lester Hamer, MBE. Director, Coronavirus Response, Department for Work and Pensions. For Public Service.
- Matthew David Hamlyn. Strategic Director, Chamber Business Team, House of Commons. For services to Parliament.
- Jane Carolyn Hanson, JP. Chair, Reclaim Fund Limited. For services to the Charity Sector.
- Lawrence John Haynes. Lately Chairman, Royal Air Force Benevolent Fund. For voluntary service to RAF Personnel and Veterans.
- Dr. Darren Richard Henley, OBE. Chief Executive, Arts Council England. For services to the Arts.
- Professor Robert Glyn Hewinson. Lately Lead Scientist, Bovine Tuberculosis, Animal and Plant Health Agency. For services to Animal Health and Welfare.
- David Hughes. Chief Executive Officer, Association of Colleges. For services to Further Education, particularly during the COVID-19 Response.
- Katherine Hannah Hughes. Director, International Climate Change, Department for Business, Energy and Industrial Strategy. For services to Tackling Climate Change.
- Stephen John Ingham. Chief Executive, PageGroup. For services to Business and to People with Disabilities.
- Professor Timothy Ingold, FBA, FRSE. Emeritus Professor of Social Anthropology, University of Aberdeen. For services to Anthropology.
- Professor Uzoamaka Linda Iwobi, OBE. For services to Racial Equality and to Championing Diversity and Inclusion.
- Professor Paul John Layzell, DL. Principal, Royal Holloway, University of London. For services to Higher Education and Technology.
- Dr. Penelope Leach. Child Wellbeing Campaigner and Researcher, Association for Infant Mental Health, East Sussex. For services to Education.
- Damian Watcyn Lewis, OBE. Actor and co-founder, Feed NHS. For services to Drama and Charity.
- Miranda Constance Lowe. Principal Curator of Crustacea, Natural History Museum. For services to Science Communication and to Diversity in Natural History.
- Vanessa Ann MacDougall. Lately Director, International Economics Unit and the G7 Taskforce, Cabinet Office. For Public Service.
- Catherine Rowena Mallyon. Executive Director, Royal Shakespeare Company. For services to Theatre and to the Arts.
- Professor Gillian Teresa Manthorpe (Jill Manthorpe). Director, Health and Social Care Workforce Research Unit and associate director, National Institute for Health and Care Research School for Social Care Research. For services to Social Work and Social Care Research.
- Nicholas Francis Markham. Chair, London and Continental Railways. For services to the Economy and to Government.
- Professor Joanne Elizabeth Martin. Director, Blizard Institute, Queen Mary University of London and lately President, Royal College of Pathologists. For services to the NHS and to Medical Education.
- Anthony Victor Martin. Philanthropist and Founder, Anthony V Martin Foundation. For Charitable Services.
- Stella Nina McCartney, OBE. Designer. For services to Fashion and to Sustainability.
- Claire McColgan, MBE. Director, Culture Liverpool. For services to Arts and Culture.
- Dr. Tony McGleenan, QC. Senior Crown Counsel, Northern Ireland. For services to Justice.
- Professor James Andrew McLaughlin, OBE. Head, School of Engineering and Director, Nanotechnology and Integrated Bioengineering Centre. For services to Higher Education and Research.
- Fitzroy Robert Charles Eric McLean Bt. OBE. Philanthropist. For services to Arts and Culture.
- Julia Evelyn Morley. Founder, Beauty With A Purpose. For charitable and voluntary services to Disadvantaged People in the UK and Abroad.
- Elisabeth Murdoch. Council Member, Arts Council England. For services to Diversity in the Arts and to Charity.
- Sarah-Jane Nicholson (Sarah-Jane Marsh). Chief Executive, Birmingham Women's and Children's NHS Foundation Trust. For services to Leadership in the NHS.
- David Anthony Nixon, OBE. Lately Artistic Director, Northern Ballet. For services to Dance.
- Chinyere Adah Nwanoku (Chi-Chi Nwanoku), OBE. Founder, Chineke! Foundation. For services to Music and to Diversity.
- Cornelia Parker, OBE. Artist. For services to the Arts.
- Gemma Elizabeth Pearce. Lately Non-Executive Director, Coal Authority. For services to Innovation and Diversity.
- Professor Aled Owain Phillips. Professor of Nephrology, Cardiff University and Cardiff and Vale University Health Board. For services to Renal Medicine.
- Helen Jane Pickles. Director, Service Delivery Partnering and Resourcing, People, Capability and Place, Department for Work and Pensions. For Public Service.
- Professor Jacqueline Samantha Reilly. Professor of Infection Prevention and Control, Glasgow Caledonian University. For services to Healthcare and Public Health.
- Henry Thomas Ripley. Deputy Legal Director, Department of Health and Social Care Legal Advisers, Government Legal Department. For services to the Law.
- Deborah Elizabeth Rogers. Lately Deputy Chief Crown Prosecutor, Crown Prosecution Service, Cy u-Wales. For services to Law and Order.
- Professor Mary Patricia Ryan, FREng. Armourers and Brasiers' Chair in Materials Science, Department of Materials, Imperial College London. For services to Education and to Materials Science and Engineering.
- Professor Julian Roy Sampson. For services to Medical Genetics.
- Polly Anna Scully. Head, Defence Strategy and Priorities, Ministry of Defence. For services to Defence.
- Michael Thomas Seals, MBE. Chair, Animal Health and Welfare Board for England. For services to the Animal Health and Welfare Sectors.
- Navin Fakirchand Shah. Lately London Assembly Member for Brent and Harrow. For Political and Public Service.
- Sandra Sheard (Sandy Sheard). Deputy Director, HM Treasury. For services to the Economics of Biodiversity.
- Professor Stephen Smartt. Professor of Astrophysics, School of Mathematics and Physics, Queen's University Belfast. For services to Science.
- Professor Renee Elizabeth Sockett, FRS (Liz Fielding). Professor, School of Life Sciences, Medical School, University of Nottingham. For services to Microbiology.
- Professor Fiona Alison Steele, OBE, FBA. Professor of Statistics, London School of Economics. For services to Statistics in the Social Sciences.
- Paul Jonathan Stein. Chairman, Rolls-Royce Small Modular Reactor Consortium. For services to the Economy.
- Arlene Sugden, OBE. Director, Child Maintenance Service, Department for Work and Pensions. For Public Service.
- Dr. David Gordon Sweeney. Executive Chair, Research England. For services to Higher Education.
- Matthew William Livingston Toombs. Director of Campaigns and Engagement, COP26, Cabinet Office. For Public Service.
- Ian George Masson Urquhart, DL. Director, Gordon and MacPhail Scotch Whisky Distillers and Distributors, and President, Johnstons of Elgin. For services to the Scotch Whisky and Textile Industries and to Charity in Moray.
- Michael Gordon Clark Urquhart. Lately Director, Gordon and MacPhail Scotch Whisky Distillers and Distributors. For services to the Scotch Whisky Industry and to Charitable Work in Moray.
- Ramesh Kanji Vala, OBE. Consultant, Ince Group plc. For services to the community and to the COVID-19 Response.
- Frances Ismay Wadsworth. Deputy Further Education Commissioner. For services to Education.
- Vincent Walsh. Deputy Director, Ministry of Defence. For services to Defence.
- Gillian Debra Walton. Chief Executive and General Secretary, Royal College of Midwives. For services to Midwifery.
- Keith Williams. Independent Chair, Williams Rail Review. For services to the Railway Industry.
- Professor Stephen John Young, FREng. Professor of Information Engineering, Information Engineering Division, Emmanuel College, University of Cambridge. For services to Software Engineering.

==== Officer of the Order of the British Empire (OBE) ====
Military

- Colonel Alistair Scott Carns, MC
- Commander Simon James Cox
- Commander Paul Andrew Jamieson
- Captain Graham John Lovatt
- Commodore Andrew Donald Rose
- Lieutenant Colonel Niall Adrian Edward Aye Maung, Royal Army Medical Corps
- Brigadier Matthew Timothy George Bazeley
- Colonel Robert Matthew William Burley (deceased)
- Lieutenant Colonel Jonathan Hugh Buxton, Royal Regiment of Artillery
- Lieutenant Colonel Rachel Anne Emmerson, MBE, The Royal Logistic Corps
- Colonel Paul Geoffrey Gilby
- Colonel Damian Russel Griffin, TD, VR, Army Reserve
- Lieutenant Colonel James Andrew Hadfield, MBE, The Rifles
- Lieutenant Colonel Nicola Jane MacLeod, MBE, Royal Army Medical Corps
- Colonel Sandra Annette Nicholson, Army Cadet Force
- Captain (now Major) Gavin Henderson Paton, The Rifles
- Group Captain Mark Robert Baker
- Group Captain John Desmond Curnow
- Wing Commander Manjeet Singh Ghataora
- Group Captain James Jonathan Hanson
- Wing Commander James Patrick Lennie, MBE

Civil

- Miranda Mary Abrey. Domestic Abuse Policy Lead, Department for Levelling Up, Housing and Communities. For services to Victims of Domestic Abuse.
- Shahina Ahmad. Principal, Eden Girls’ School, London Borough of Waltham Forest. For services to Education.
- Osman Ahmed. Senior Officer, National Crime Agency. For services to Law Enforcement.
- Professor Babak Akhgar. Director, Centre for Excellence in Terrorism, Resilience, Intelligence and Organised Crime Research, Sheffield Hallam University. For services to Security Research.
- Moeen Ali. For services to Cricket.
- Dr. Raghib Ali. Consultant in Acute Medicine, Oxford University Hospitals NHS Trust and Senior Clinical Research Associate, Epidemiology, University of Cambridge. For services to the NHS and to the Covid-19 response.
- Dr. Elaine Allen. Executive Headteacher, St John Vianney School and English Hub, Blackpool. For services to Education.
- Wesley Auvache. Parliamentary Logistics Manager, House of Commons. For services to Parliament.
- Claire Ball. Deputy Director of Operations, G7 Taskforce, Cabinet Office. For Public Service.
- Miranda Rosemary Barker. Chief Executive Officer, East Lancashire Chamber of Commerce. For services to Business and to the community in Lancashire.
- Professor John Richard Barrett. Professor of Energy and Climate Policy, University of Leeds. For services to Climate Change Assessment.
- Jane Michelle Barton. Department for Environment, Food and Rural Affairs. For services to EU Exit Negotiations.
- Professor Rachel Louise Batterham. Professor of Obesity, Diabetes and Endocrinology, University College London. For services to People Affected by Obesity.
- Antonia Denise Belcher. For services to Equality in Business.
- Virginia Caroline Bennett. Senior Lawyer, Department for Business, Energy and Industrial Strategy Legal Advisers, Government Legal Department. For services to Climate Change Law.
- Lisa Bennett-Dietrich. Chief Executive Officer, Community Relations In Schools. For services to Peace Education and Community Reconciliation in Northern Ireland.
- Coral Benstead. Team Leader, Ministry of Defence. For services to Defence.
- Karen Elizabeth Betts. Chief Executive, Scotch Whisky Association. For services to International Trade.
- Richard Harrison Bevan. Chief Executive, League Managers Association. For services to Association Football.
- Kishorkant Bhattessa (Vinu Bhattessa). Managing Director, Mandeville Hotel Group and Trustee, Bochasanwasi Shri Akshar Purushottam Swaminarayan Temple. For charitable and voluntary services, particularly during Covid-19.
- Harry Alexander Clarence Bicket. Conductor. For services to Music.
- Luther Loide Blissett, DL. Patron, Sporting Memories. For services to Association Football and to Charity.
- Alexis Bowater. For services to the Safety and Equality of Women.
- Katrina Bowes. Chief Executive Officer, Tapestry Partnership, For services to Teachers and Educators in Scotland.
- Terence Hugh Brannigan. Chairman, Tourism Northern Ireland. For services to Tourism and to the Business Community in Northern Ireland.
- Lisa Bryer. Founder, London Screen Academy. For services to Culture.
- Dr. Alice Bunn. Lately Director, UK Space Agency. For services to the UK Space Sector and to Charity.
- Prudence Margaret Burch (Vidyamala Burch). Co-founder, Breathworks. For services to Wellbeing and Pain Management.
- Simon Wallis Irwin Burrowes. Editor of Debates, Hansard, and Head of Public Engagement, Northern Ireland Assembly. For services to Parliament and to Sport in Northern Ireland.
- Martyn Butler (David Hewett). Co-founder, Terrence Higgins Trust. For services to Charity and to Public Health.
- Jane Byam Shaw. Co-Founder, The Felix Project. For services to the community in London.
- Dr. Fiona Mary Campbell. Consultant Paediatrician, Leeds Teaching Hospitals NHS Trust. For services to Children and Young People with Diabetes.
- Nicholas Capaldi. Chief Executive, Arts Council of Wales. For services to the Arts.
- Nicholas Robert Carver. Chief Executive, East and North Hertfordshire NHS Trust. For services to the NHS.
- Ruth Mary Chambers. Senior Fellow, Greener UK and Green Alliance. For services to the Environment.
- Dr. Shamil Chandaria. For services to Science and Technology, to Finance and to Philanthropy.
- Simon Paul Chesterman, QPM. Chief Constable and Chief Executive Officer, Civil Nuclear Constabulary. For services to Policing.
- Afia Choudhury. Foster Carer, London Borough of Tower Hamlets. For services to Children.
- Diana Chrouch. Special Adviser, All Party Parliamentary Group for Ethnic Minority Business Owners and Diversity Chair, Worshipful Company of Constructors. For services to Diversity and Inclusion and to Business Growth and Marketing Strategy.
- Nicola Clark. Chief Executive, UMi and Chair of Governors, Sedgefield Hardwick Primary School, County Durham. For services to Business and Social Enterprise in North East England.
- His Honour Anthony Simon Lissant Cleary. Founding Editor, The Family Court Practice. For services to the Family Justice System.
- Jill Patricia Colbert. Director of Children's Services and Chief Executive, Together for Children. For services to Children’s Social Care.
- Robert Colbourne. Chief Executive Officer, Performance Through People. For services to Skills and Apprenticeships.
- Dr. Stephen James Cole. Intensive Care Doctor, NHS Tayside and President, Scottish Intensive Care Society. For services to the NHS and to the Covid-19 Response.
- Frank Thomas Collins. Chairman, The Robert Jones and Agnes Hunt Orthopaedic Hospital NHS Foundation Trust. For services to the NHS.
- Karen Lyn Cook. Lately Head of Social Work and Social Care, Central and North West London NHS Foundation Trust. For services to the Social Work Profession.
- Edward David Cornmell. Deputy Director, Prison Covid Gold Command, HM Prison and Probation Service. For Public Service.
- Professor Constantin Coussios, FREng. Director, Institute of Biomedical Engineering, University of Oxford. For services to Biomedical Engineering.
- Zoe Maxine Couzens. Principal in Public Health, Public Health Wales NHS Trust. For services to Public Health during Covid-19.
- Graham Cowley. Independent Chair, Blackpool Opportunity Area. For services to Children, Young People and to the Community in Blackpool.
- David John Crossan. For services to Exports and Inward Investment in Scotland.
- Dyan Crowther. Chief Executive Officer, HS1 Ltd. For services to Rail Transport.
- John Cecil Dauth, LVO, AO. Vice Chair, Board of Trustees, British Red Cross. For voluntary service to the British Red Cross.
- Huw John David. Councillor and Leader, Bridgend County Borough Council. For Public Service.
- Stephen Davies. Director of Education, Welsh Government. For services to Education in Wales.
- Professor Jon Davis. Author, Professor of Government Education and Director, The Strand Group, King's College London. For services to Education and History.
- Dr. Anne Mary De Bono. Consultant Occupational Physician, University Hospitals of Leicester NHS Trust and President, Faculty of Occupational Medicine, Royal College of Physicians. For services to Occupational Medicine.
- Jasbir Singh Dhesi. Principal and Chief Executive Officer, Cheshire College South and West. For services to Education.
- Alan Dinsmore. Principal Scientific Officer, Forensic Science Northern Ireland. For services to Justice and Forensic Science.
- Patricia Donnelly. Head, Covid-19 Vaccination Programme in Northern Ireland. For services to the Covid-19 Response.
- Bernard Michael Donoghue. Chief Executive Officer, Association of Leading Visitor Attractions. For services to Tourism and to Culture.
- Marc Grenville Donovan. Chief Pharmacist, Boots UK Limited. For services to Pharmacy.
- Claire Elizabeth Dorer. Chief Executive Officer, The National Association of Independent Schools and Non-Maintained Special Schools. For services to Children and Young People with Special Educational Needs and Disabilities.
- Professor Sean Duggan. Chief Executive, Mental Health Network, NHS Confederation. For services to Public Health.
- Sharon Elizabeth Durant. For services to Music and to the community in Newcastle upon Tyne.
- Professor Janet Caroline Dwyer. Lately, director, Countryside and Community Research Institute, University of Gloucestershire. For services to Rural Research.
- Margaret Elizabeth Edwards. Independent Chair, Civil Service Pension Board. For Public Service.
- Mark Ryall Edwards. For services to Photography and to the Environment.
- Michael Andrew Edwards, VR, DL. For Public and Charitable service in Scotland.
- Professor Henry Irvine Ellington. For services to Education and Staff Development.
- Dr. Noha ElSakka. Consultant, Medical Microbiology and Virology and Service Clinical Director, NHS Grampian. For services to the NHS and the Covid-19 Response.
- Matthew English. Team Leader, Ministry of Defence. For services to Defence.
- Esi Addae Eshun. Director, Legal and Compliance, UK Export Finance. For services to Corporate Law and Compliance.
- Andrew Mark Evans. Chief Pharmaceutical Officer, Welsh Government. For services to the Covid-19 Response.
- Sarah Jane Ewart. For services to Abortion Legal Reform in Northern Ireland.
- Lora Marie Fachie, MBE. For services to Cycling.
- Neil Michael Fachie, MBE. For services to Cycling.
- Anne Marie Farrelly. Senior Officer, National Crime Agency. For services to Law Enforcement.
- Paula Ann Farrow. Chief Executive Officer, Nexus Education Schools Trust. For services to Education.
- Professor Saul Nicholas Faust. Professor of Paediatric Immunology and Infectious Diseases and Director, National Institute for Health and Care Research Southampton Clinical Research Facility, University of Southampton and University Hospital Southampton NHS Foundation Trust. For services to the Covid-19 Response.
- Jane Katrina Fearnley. Chief Executive Officer and Executive Headteacher, Willow Tree Academy Trust. For services to Education.
- Elizabeth Jane Fenton. Deputy Chief Nurse, Health Education England. For services to the Nursing Profession.
- Rio Gavin Ferdinand. For services to Association Football and to Charity.
- Professor Rebecca Fitzgerald. Director, Early Cancer Institute, University of Cambridge. For services to Cancer Research.
- Dr. Liam Vincent Fleming. Co-Leader of International Advice, Joint Nature Conservation Committee. For services to the Environment.
- Michael Foreman. Illustrator and Author. For services to Literature.
- William Richard Mervyn Christopher Foyle, DL. For services to Publishing, to Aviation and to Charity.
- Joyce Fraser. Founder, Black Heroes Foundation. For services to the Promotion of Black History and Heritage.
- Dr. Andrew Simon Furber. Regional Director, North West and NHS Regional Director of Public Health, North West, Department for Health and Social Care. For services to Public Health.
- Professor Carol Lynnette Gabriel. Professor, Higher Education Academy, York St John University. For services to Higher Education.
- Lindsay Graham. Deputy Chair, Poverty and Inequality Commission Scotland. For services to Tackling Children's Food Insecurity.
- Professor Caroline Gray. Professor, Enterprise, Engagement and Knowledge Transfer, Wrexham Glyndŵr University. For services to the Optical Industry and to Business in Wales.
- Edward Richard Green. Deputy Director, Commercial Policy – International and Reform, Cabinet Office. For Public Service.
- Catherine Elizabeth Gulliver. Senior Lawyer, Department for Business, Energy, and Industrial Strategy Legal Advisers, Government Legal Department. For services to Climate Change Law.
- Dr. David Rhys Gwyn. For services to Archaeology and History in Wales.
- Dr. Graham Haddock. Chief Commissioner of Scotland and National Awards Assessor, Scout Association. For services to Young People.
- David Peter Hadfield. President, Boccia International Sports Federation. For services to Sport.
- Lance Victor George Haggith. Founder, Sports Traider. For charitable and voluntary services to Vulnerable People, particularly during Covid-19.
- Abdul Hai. Lately Cabinet Member for Young People, Equalities and Cohesion, London Borough of Camden. For services to Young People and to the community in Camden and London.
- Corrine Claire Hall, MBE. For services to Cycling.
- Andrew Mark Harmer. Managing Director, Cruise Lines International Association UK and Ireland. For services to the Maritime Sector.
- Hifsa Haroon-Iqbal, MBE, DL. Regional Prevent Co-ordinator, Department for Education. For services to Social Cohesion.
- David Anthony Harris. For Political and Public Service.
- Joanne Michèle Sylvie Harris, MBE. Author. For services to Literature.
- Derek Robert Harrison. Lately Governor, HM Prison Kirkham, HM Prison and Probation Service. For services to Prison Education.
- Justin David Hayward. Musician and Songwriter. For services to Music.
- Dr. Helene Theresa Hewitt. Science Fellow Ocean Modelling, Meteorological Office. For services to Climate Science.
- Professor Karen Joy Heywood, FRS. Professor of Physical Oceanography, University of East Anglia. For services to Oceanography.
- Linda Susan Hindle. Lead Allied Health Professional and National Engagement Lead for Police, Fire, and Ambulance Services, Office for Health Improvement and Disparities, Department for Health and Social Care, and Deputy Chief Allied Health Professions Officer (England). For services to Public Health.
- Sean Terence Hogan. Chair, TB Eradication Partnership. For services to the Agricultural Industry in Northern Ireland.
- Gillian Ann Holmes. Deputy Director, Department for Work and Pensions. For services to Public Service.
- Catherine Alice Howarth. Chief Executive Officer, ShareAction. For services to Sustainability.
- Brian Hughes. Lately Deputy Principal, Glasgow Clyde College. For services to Further Education in Glasgow.
- Lyndon Robert Campbell Hughes-Jennett. Northern Ireland Attaché, British Embassy, Washington. For services to the community in Northern Ireland.
- Philip Husband. Governing Governor, HM Prison Durham. For Public Service.
- Dr. Azeem Ibrahim. Director, New Lines Institute for Strategy and Policy. For services to the Union, to Diversity and to Foreign Policy.
- Christian Kyle Irwin. Industry Programme Director, Network Rail. For services to the Rail Industry.
- David Macfarlane Jackson. Artistic Director, BBC Cardiff Singer of the World, and lately Head of Music, BBC Wales. For services to Music.
- Dr. David Lawson Jacques. For services to Garden History and Conservation.
- Kurt William Janson. Director, Tourism Alliance. For services to the Tourism Industry.
- Dr. Lisa Jayne Jardine-Wright. Co-Founder, Isaac Physics. For services to Education.
- Wayne Johns. Senior Investigating Officer, National Crime Agency. For services to Law Enforcement.
- Professor Margaret Anne Johnson. Professor of Medicine, University College London. For services to the NHS and People with HIV.
- Jonathan Paul Johnson. Chief Executive Officer, West Lakes Multi Academy Trust. For services to Education.
- Professor Paul James Johnson. Professor of Sociology and Executive Dean, University of Leeds. For services to Equality, to Diversity and to Human Rights.
- Tom Simon Lee Joule. Founder and Chief Brand Officer, Joules Group plc. For services to Business and to the community in Leicestershire.
- Haroon Karim. Chair, Balham and Tooting Mosque and Trustee, World Memon Organisation. For services to Philanthropy and to the community in South London and Pakistan.
- Nigel James Keery. Head of Estates Operations, Belfast Health and Social Care Trust. For services to Public Health.
- Sally Ann Kelly. Chief Executive Officer, Aberlour Child Care Trust. For services to Families in Scotland.
- Professor Jean Scott Ker (Jean Scott Cachia). Lately Associate Postgraduate Dean, NHS Education for Scotland. For services to Medical Education.
- Ian Deans Kernohan. Manager, Review Secretariat, Scottish Government. For Public Service.
- Mordechai Kessler, MBE. Chairman and Chief Executive Officer, 2M Group. For services to Industry and Exporting in North West England.
- Dr. Margalith Kessler. Co-owner and Export Director, 2M Group. For services to Industry in North West England.
- Jemima Kirwan. Team Leader, Ministry of Defence. For services to Defence.
- Professor David Charles Kluth. For services to Medical Education during the Covid-19 response.
- Kamruddin Kothia. Chair of Trustees, Star Academies. For services to Education.
- Ioannis Kerestentzopoulos Koursis. Principal and Chief Executive Officer, Barnsley College, South Yorkshire. For services to Further Education.
- Jane Alison Lady Gibson. Chair, Spirit of 2012. For services to Volunteering, to Heritage and to the Arts.
- Shivani Lakhani. Society Team Lead, Covid-19 Taskforce, Cabinet Office. For services to Vulnerable Communities during the Covid-19 Response.
- Christopher James Laurence, MBE, QVRM, TD. Chair, Canine and Feline Sector Group. For services to Animal Welfare.
- Rosemary Lee. Choreographer. For services to Dance.
- Kevin Leggett. Senior Operational Manager, Public Service Prisons South, HM Prison and Probation Service. For Public Service, particularly during Covid 19.
- Mary Elizabeth Lemon. Principal Officer, Department of Justice, Northern Ireland Executive. For services to the Justice System and to Vulnerable People.
- Neville Lewis. Officer, National Crime Agency. For services to Law Enforcement.
- Helen Frances Lilley. Assistant Head, Afghanistan Security Policy. For services to Defence.
- Jane Kathleen Longhurst. Lately Chief Executive Officer, Meetings Industry Association. For services to the Business Events Sector.
- Eleanor Patricia MacKewn (Eleanor O’Riordan). Deputy Director, Events, COP26 Unit, Cabinet Office. For Public Service.
- Professor Jose Alejandro Madrigal Fernandez. Professor of Haematology, Royal Free London NHS Foundation Trust and Scientific Director, Anthony Nolan. For services to Haematology.
- Louise Catherine Magee. Lately General Secretary, Welsh Labour Party. For Political Service.
- Professor Kathryn Maitland. Professor of Tropical Paediatric Infectious Disease, Imperial College London. For services to Medical Science.
- Warren Marks. Senior Principal Scientist, Applied Data Science, Defence Science and Technology Laboratory. For services to Defence and Security.
- John George Marnock. Police Staff and Chair, National Surveillance User Group, Thames Valley Police. For services to Policing.
- Sandra Carmen Stella Martin. For services to International Trade.
- Lee Mason-Ellis. Chief Executive Officer, The Pioneer Academy Trust. For services to Education.
- Sumeet Kaur Matharu. Chief Pharmacist, Defence Primary Healthcare, Ministry of Defence. For services to Armed Forces Healthcare.
- Elizabeth Maudslay. Lately SEND Policy Manager, Association of Colleges. For services to Children and Young People with Special Educational Needs and Disabilities.
- Alistair Charles McAuley. For services to Business, the Construction Industry and to Charity.
- Veronica McCaulsky (Veronica Martin). Founder, Beyond Our Youth and Chief Operating Officer, Aleto Foundation. For services to Young People.
- Emma McClarkin. Chief Executive Officer, British Beer and Pub Association. For services to the Hospitality Sector, particularly during Covid-19.
- Robin Andrew McCleary, MBE. Storage, Distribution and Freight Lead, Logistics, Commodities and Services, Defence Equipment and Support, Ministry of Defence. For services to Defence.
- Noel William McKee, MBE. For services to Charity in Northern Ireland.
- John Alphonsus Paul McLaughlin. Director, HM Prison Oakwood, G4S Care and Justice Services Limited. For services to HM Prison and Probation Service.
- Professor Trevor John McMillan. Vice-chancellor, Keele University. For services to Higher Education.
- Andrew Mill. Chair, European Marine Energy Centre. For services to the Environment and to the community in Orkney.
- Yasmine Joun Moezinia. Deputy Director, COP26 Private Finance Hub, HM Treasury. For services to Climate Finance.
- Andrew Gerald Moll. Chief Inspector, Marine Accident Investigation Branch. For services to Maritime Safety.
- Andrew Morgan. Councillor and Leader, Rhondda Cynon Taff County Borough Council. For Public Service.
- Charlotte Morton. Chief Executive, Anaerobic Digestion and Bioresources Association. For services to the Development of the Biogas Industry.
- Professor Paul Moss. Professor of Haematology, University of Birmingham. For services to Immunotherapy and to Covid-19 Research.
- David John Moutrey. Director and Chief Executive, HOME Manchester. For services to the Arts, particularly during Covid-19.
- Eve Muirhead, MBE. Skip, British Olympic Curling Team. For services to Curling.
- Donna Louise Mulhern. Lately Head, Covid Response Team HM Courts and Tribunals Service. For Public Service, particularly during Covid-19.
- Mohammed Abdul Munim. For services to the British Bangladeshi Catering Industry.
- Christine Maria Murray. Delivery Director, South West Region, HM Courts and Tribunal Service. For Public Service.
- Rohit Naik. Headteacher, Hope School, Liverpool. For services to Education.
- Professor Samia Nefti-Meziani. Professor of Artificial Intelligence and Robotics, and Head, Centre for Autonomous Systems and Advanced Robotics. For services to Robotics.
- Professor Sze May Ng. Chair, Association of Children's Diabetes Clinicians and Consultant Paediatric Endocrinologist, Southport and Ormskirk Hospital NHS Trust. For services to People with Diabetes and People with Autism and Disabilities.
- Robert Frederick Strang Noble. Senior Executive, New Adventures and Cameron Mackintosh Limited. For services to the Performing Arts.
- Caroline Anne Rose Norbury, MBE. Chief Executive, Creative UK. For services to the Creative Sector.
- Annemarie O'Donnell. Chief Executive, Glasgow City Council and Chair, COP26 Programme Board. For services to Local Government.
- Sean O'Loughlin. For services to Rugby League Football.
- Dr. Charles Ogilvie. Strategy Director, COP26 Unit, Cabinet Office. For Public Service.
- Lisa Pascoe. Deputy Director, Social Care Policy, Ofsted. For services to Children's Services.
- Professor Simon Peyton Jones. Chair, Computing At School and National Centre for Computing Education. For services to Education and to Computer Science.
- Stephanie Isabelle Pfeifer. Chief Executive, Institutional Investors Group on Climate Change. For services to Climate Finance.
- Stephanie Phair. Chair, British Fashion Council, and Chief Customer Officer, Farfetch. For services to Fashion and to Technology.
- Wendy Price. Manager, University of Sunderland. For services to Higher Education.
- Professor Sarah Purdy. Pro Vice-chancellor, University of Bristol and General Practitioner, Sea Mills Surgery, Bristol. For services to General Practice.
- Charles Stuart Rangeley-Wilson. Chair, The Chalk Rivers Restoration Group. For services to Chalk Stream Conservation.
- Dr. Eileen Catherine Rees. Species Science Manager, Wildfowl and Wetlands Trust. For services to International Research and the Conservation of Swans and Other Waterbirds.
- Professor Mary Josephine Renfrew. Professor Emeritus of Mother and Infant Health, University of Dundee. For services to Midwifery.
- Andrew Rhodes, QPM. Lately Chief Constable, Lancashire Constabulary. For services to Emergency Responder Wellbeing and Mental Health.
- Dr. Gillian Richardson. Lately Executive Director of Public Health, Aneurin Bevan University Health Board, Deputy Chief Medical Officer (Vaccines), Wales, and Clinical Director and initiating Chair, Covid-19 Vaccine Programme Board, Wales. For services to Public Health and to the Covid-19 Response in Wales.
- Thomas Charles Rivett-Carnac. Founding Partner, Global Optimism. For services to Tackling Climate Change.
- Clare Bernadette Roberts. Chief Executive Officer, Kids Planet Day Nurseries, Manchester. For services to Education.
- Colonel John William Rollins, MBE. For services to the Armed Forces in Northern Ireland.
- Dr. Jenna Louise Ross. For services to Agriculture and to Science.
- Vippen Paul Sagoo. Founder, Global Asian Awards. For services to the Asian community, and to Diversity and Inclusion.
- Dr. Ingrid Helene Samuel. Historic Environment Director, National Trust, and lately Acting Chair, The Heritage Alliance. For services to Heritage.
- Bruce Andrew Scammell. Team Leader, Ministry of Defence. For services to Defence.
- Jennifer Sealey, MBE. Artistic Director and Chief Executive Officer, Graeae Theatre. For services to Disability Arts.
- Tariq Navid Shah. Philanthropist. For services to Charity.
- Dawn Cynthia Shaw. Chief Executive, NI Guardian Ad Litem Agency. For services to Social Work in the Voluntary and Community Sector.
- Simon John Shepherd. Director, The Butler Trust. For services to HM Prison and Probation Service.
- Paul Simpson. Chief Executive Officer, CDP. For services to Tackling Climate Change.
- The Right Honourable Christopher James Skidmore, MP. Member of Parliament for Kingswood. For Parliamentary and Public Service.
- Professor Sarah Smith. Professor of Economics, University of Bristol. For services to Economics and to Education.
- Jonathan Winston Sparkes. For services to Homeless People.
- Robert Vincent Stephenson-Padron. Managing Director, Penrose Care. For services to Social Care.
- Amanda Stewart. Lately Chief Executive, Northern Ireland Policing Board. For Public Service.
- Michael George Summerbee. For services to Association Football and to Charity.
- Martin Sutherland. Chief Executive, Coventry City of Culture Trust. For services to Culture and to Economic and Social Regeneration in Coventry.
- Theocharis Panayiotou Theochari. Chair, Maritime UK. For services to the Maritime Sector.
- Heidi Louise Thomas McGann. Screenwriter and Playwright. For services to Drama.
- Ian Thornton. Chief Executive, Norwich City Community Sports Foundation. For services to communities in East Anglia.
- David Henry Tomback. Development Economics Director, Historic England. For services to Heritage.
- Karen Margaret Tonge, MBE. Chair, Para Table Tennis. For services to Table Tennis.
- David Andrew Tosh, JP. Director of Resources, Welsh Parliament Commission. For Parliamentary and Public Service.
- Isobel Townsley. Explosives Policy Lead, Home Office. For Public Service.
- James Trout. Manager, Environment Agency. For services to the Support of Young Scientists with Disabilities and to the Covid-19 Response.
- Victoria Jane Turton. Chief Executive Officer, All3Media. For services to the Television Production Industry.
- Russell Tyner. Specialist Prosecutor, International Justice and Organised Crime Division, Crown Prosecution Service. For services to Law and Order.
- Professor John Unsworth. Chair, The Queen’s Nursing Institute. For services to Community Nursing and Community Nurse Education.
- Richard Malcolm Walker. Managing Director, Iceland Frozen Foods. For services to Business and to the Environment.
- Samantha Jane Ward. Deputy Chief Executive and Director of Services, Royal Voluntary Service. For Charitable Services.
- Linda Jayne Waters. Assistant Chief Officer and Director of Finance Thames Valley Police. For services to Policing.
- Doreen Emelda Watkins (Dotty Watkins). Head of Quality and Governance Maternity, Rotherham NHS Foundation Trust. For services to Midwifery.
- Iain Ashton Watson. Visiting Professor, Newcastle University and lately Director, Tyne and Wear Archives and Museums. For services to Culture and to the community in North East England.
- Ian Watson. Founder, Hadrian Healthcare Group and Founder, Watson Family Charitable Trust. For services to Philanthropy and to Charity.
- Scott Peter Weavers-Wright. For services to Technology and to Retail E-commerce Entrepreneurship.
- Paula Webb. Trustee, The Pathological Demand Avoidance Society. For services to Children and Young People with Special Educational Needs and Disabilities.
- Dr. Rupert Edward David Whitaker. Co-founder, Terrence Higgins Trust. For services to Charity and to Public Health.
- Jill Marie Whittaker. Managing Director, HIT Training. For services to Training and Apprenticeships in Hospitality, Care and Management.
- Donna Lynne Williams. Director of Supplies and Services Division, Construction and Procurement Delivery, Northern Ireland Civil Service. For Public and Charitable Service.
- Deborah Amanda Williams. Executive Director, Creative Diversity Network. For services to Diversity in the Arts and Creative Industries.
- Alan James Woods. Deputy Director, Further Education and Apprenticeships Division, Welsh Government. For services to Education.
- Professor David Anthony Worsley. Professor of Engineering, Swansea University. For services to Advanced Materials and Solar Energy Research for Low Carbon Technology.
- Suzanne Kathryn Wylie. Lately Chief Executive, Belfast City Council. For services to Local Government in Northern Ireland.
- Professor Parveen Yaqoob. Deputy Vice-chancellor, University of Reading. For services to Higher Education.
- Joanne Youle. Chief Executive Officer, Missing People. For services to the Families of Missing People.
- Dr. Peter Jeffrey Young. Consultant, Anaesthesia and Critical Care, The Queen Elizabeth Hospital King's Lynn NHS Foundation Trust. For services to Innovation and the Prevention of Never Events in the NHS.
- Charlotte Elizabeth Young. Chair and Trustee, School for Social Entrepreneurs. For services to Social Enterprise.
- Dr. Asim Yusuf. Consultant Psychiatrist and Islamic Scholar. For services to the Muslim Community.
- Melissa Zanocco. Head of Programmes, Infrastructure Client Group. For services to the Built Environment.
- Dr. Sabir Zazai, FRSE. Chief Executive, Scottish Refugee Council. For services to Refugees.

==== Member of the Order of the British Empire (MBE) ====
Military

- Warrant Officer 1 Logistician (Catering Services) Jason Anthony Bignell
- Lieutenant Commander Richard Burns
- Lieutenant Commander Jonathan Henry Gibbin Fletcher
- Commander Michael Forrester
- Lieutenant Commander Nathaniel Charles Shane Geddes
- Lieutenant Commander Amy Francesca Gilmore
- Lieutenant Commander Simon Henderson
- Lieutenant Thomas Robert Horton
- Warrant Officer 1 Amanda Knight
- Lieutenant Commander Steven Lovatt
- Lieutenant Colonel Jon Ridley
- Lieutenant Commander Nicholas Charles Stratton
- Commander Nicola Wallace
- Warrant Officer Class 2 Barry Appleton, VR, The Royal Dragoon Guards, Army Reserve
- Lieutenant Colonel (now Acting Colonel) Sally Yvonne Arthurton, Royal Corps of Signals
- Second Lieutenant (now Lieutenant) Joshua Jamal Bell, Intelligence Corps, Army Reserve
- Lieutenant Colonel (now Colonel) Darren Michael Bishop, VR, Royal Regiment of Artillery, Army Reserve
- Major Thomas Henry Blair, The Ranger Regiment
- Captain Harpreet Kaur Chandi, Royal Army Medical Corps
- Warrant Officer Class 1 James Ashley Cooper, Corps of Royal Electrical and Mechanical Engineers
- Major Daniel Peter Cornwell, The Royal Logistic Corps
- Corporal (now Sergeant) Ross William Daniels, Corps of Royal Electrical and Mechanical Engineers
- Corporal Aristotle Kwaasi Djin, Corps of Royal Engineers
- Captain Lorraine Anne Dotchin, VR, Corps of Royal Engineers, Army Reserve
- Major Simon Aubrey Farmer, Corps of Royal Engineers
- Lieutenant Colonel Nigel Simon Francis, Intelligence Corps
- Lieutenant Colonel Maximillian John Cameron Garrety, VR, The Royal Wessex Yeomanry, Army Reserve
- Lieutenant Colonel Matthew Goodchild, The Parachute Regiment
- Captain Robert David Goodman, Royal Regiment of Artillery
- Captain Kevin Edward Haley, Royal Army Physical Training Corps
- Corporal Christopher Charles Hammond, Army Air Corps
- Major Joshua Mark Head, Royal Regiment of Artillery
- Captain Daniel James Herbert, Corps of Royal Electrical and Mechanical Engineers
- Captain Philip Michael High, The Royal Logistic Corps
- Warrant Officer Class 1 Jamie Robert Hutch, The Royal Logistic Corps
- Major Matthew Stephen Johns, Royal Corps of Signals, Army Reserve
- Major Matthew James Keogh, Corps of Royal Electrical and Mechanical Engineers
- Major (now Lieutenant Colonel) Edward Alexander Rhodes Lyons, The Yorkshire Regiment
- Warrant Officer Class 1 James MacRae, Royal Corps of Signals
- Major (now Lieutenant Colonel) Matthew Royston Mallett, Royal Corps of Signals
- Acting Major (now Major) Jack Andrew Millar, The Royal Gurkha Rifles
- Staff Sergeant (now Warrant Officer Class 2) Richard David Moody, Royal Army Physical Training Corps
- Lieutenant Liam Gregory Morrissey, General Service Corps, Army Reserve
- Captain Imogen Louise Mould, Intelligence Corps, Army Reserve
- Lieutenant Colonel Karl Douglas Parfitt, Corps of Royal Engineers, Army Reserve
- Warrant Officer Class 2 Anthony John Parker, Adjutant General's Corps (Staff and Personnel Support Branch)
- Major Frederick John Pitto, The Royal Gibraltar Regiment
- Warrant Officer Class 2 Christopher Renshaw, Royal Corps of Signals, Army Reserve
- Warrant Officer Class 1 Alan John Robertson, VR, Adjutant General's Corps (Royal Military Police), Army Reserve
- Major Nicholas Brian Rogerson, The Parachute Regiment
- Major Gordon Macdonald Rowan, The Royal Regiment of Scotland
- Major James Allan Spelling, Royal Regiment of Artillery
- Major (now Lieutenant Colonel) Michael John Stewart, Corps of Royal Engineers
- Major Nathan Giles Tyler, Royal Regiment of Artillery
- Major (now Lieutenant Colonel) Elaine Susan Walker, Royal Army Medical Corps
- Sergeant (now Staff Sergeant) Felicia Marcellas Watkinson, Adjutant General's Corps (Staff and Personnel Support Branch)
- Major Christine Jean Woods, Corps of Royal Electrical and Mechanical Engineers
- Acting Flight Sergeant Christopher Francis Bell
- Squadron Leader Adele Ebbs-Brown
- Wing Commander Paul Charles Cox
- Flight Lieutenant Owen Davies
- Squadron Leader William Richmond Gibson
- Sergeant David Andrew Gittins
- Flight Sergeant Adele Good
- Warrant Officer Brian Hagan
- Squadron Leader Carl Matthew Hamilton-Reed
- Acting Corporal Lucy Jane Housego
- Squadron Leader Matthew Martin Lee
- Warrant Officer Charles McKnight
- Wing Commander James Roycroft
- Warrant Officer Robert Andrew Williams

Civil

- Jennifer Adamson. Headteacher, Saffron Valley Collegiate School. For services to the Education of Disadvantaged and Vulnerable Children.
- Guy William Addington. Water Safety Lead, South East and Volunteer Helm, Margate Lifeboat Station, Royal National Lifeboat Institution. For services to Maritime Safety.
- Dr. Olukayode Adetokun Adegbembo. Chair of Governors, Scarborough TEC. For services to Education.
- Rozina Ahmed. Principal Policy Officer, Mayor of London's Office. For services to Equality, Diversity and Inclusion in Education, Culture and Sport.
- Dr. Rizwan Yahya Ahmed. Consultant Respiratory Physician, Bolton NHS Foundation Trust. For services to Public Health during Covid-19.
- Sharon Marcia Aldridge-Bent. Director of Nursing Programmes – Leadership, The Queen's Nursing Institute. For services to Community Nursing.
- Tariq Ali. For services to the community in Wolverhampton during Covid-19.
- Vicki Dela Amedume. Artistic Director, Upswing. For services to Circus Performance.
- Bridgette Mary Angell. Head of Recreation and Visitor Experience, Forestry England and CoChair, Outdoor Recreation Network. For services to Forestry and to Outdoor Recreation.
- John Anthony. Race Lead, Home Office. For services to Diversity and Inclusion.
- Emily Jane Arbuthnot. Peritoneal Malignancy Institute Manager, Hampshire Hospitals NHS Foundation Trust. For services to the NHS.
- Professor Gillian Alexandra Armstrong. Professor of Business Education and Director, Business Engagement Unit, Ulster University. For services to Higher Education and Business.
- Mohammad Asad. Imam and Muslim Chaplain. For services to Charitable Fundraising and to the NHS during Covid-19.
- Bradley Graham Aspess. Founder, Rarewaves. For services to International Trade and Exports.
- Claire Margaret Aston. Head of Long-Term Complex Care for Aneurin Bevan University Health Board, Gwent. For services to the Covid-19 Response in Wales.
- Jane Katharine Atkins. Water Resource Specialist, Environment Agency. For services to Water Resources and the Natural Environment in North West England.
- Hugh George Atkins (Tim Blacksmith). Co-founder, Tim and Danny Music. For services to Music.
- Lydia Charlotte Austen. Head of Border Industry Engagement and Programme Delivery, Department for Transport. For services to Transport during Covid-19.
- Mohammed Sadiq Badat. For voluntary and charitable services in the community of Leicester and Abroad.
- Andrew Robert Baird. Chair of the Corporation, East Surrey College. For services to Further Education.
- Corinne Belinda Baisden. Registered Care Manager, Managing Care Limited. For services to Social Care and the community in London, particularly during Covid-19.
- Gareth Frank Bale. For services to Association Football and to Charity.
- James Joseph Banks. Chief Executive, London Funders. For services to Charitable Funding in London, particularly during Covid-19.
- Susan Barnes. Manager, Mais House Royal British Legion Care Home. For services to Veterans.
- Peter John Bason. For services to Education and to Sport in Northampton.
- Stuart Conrad Bates. Co-Founder, Spennylympics. For services to the Motor Neurone Disease Association.
- Kelly Beaver. Chief Executive Officer, Ipsos MORI. For services to Academia, to Research and the Covid-19 Response.
- John Edward Bedlington. Chair, LIVErNORTH. For services to Patients with Liver Disease.
- Joan Bedlington. Honorary Treasurer, LIVErNORTH. For services to Patients with Liver Disease.
- Jordan Beecher. Officer, National Crime Agency. For services to Law Enforcement.
- Nicola Ann Bell. South East Regional Director, National Highways. For services to Transport and to the Covid-19 Response.
- Samuel Bell. For voluntary services to People with Disabilities and their Carers in Northern Ireland.
- Janet Ann Bell. Director, Glastonbury Abbey. For services to Heritage.
- Nicola Justine Benyahia. Founder, Families for Life. For services to Education.
- Etta Jane Bertschinger (Etta Murfitt). Dance Artist. For services to Dance.
- Pranav Bhanot. Councillor, Chigwell Parish Council. For services to the Community in Chigwell, Essex.
- Chenine Bhathena. Creative Director, Coventry City of Culture Trust. For services to Culture and to the community in Coventry.
- Christine Mary Blackmore. Foster Carer, Hampshire County Council. For services to Fostering.
- Lesley Isobel Blair. For services to the Beauty Industry during Covid-19.
- Euan Anthony Blair. Founder and Chief Executive, Multiverse. For services to Education.
- Stephen Lawrence Blunden. Chief Executive, Childhood First. For services to Children and Young People.
- Barry Adam Boffy. Head of Inclusion and Diversity, British Transport Police. For services to Policing.
- Camilla Ann Born. Policy Adviser to the COP26 President, Cabinet Office. For Public Service.
- Pamela Ann Bostock. Consultant Occupational Therapist, Midlands Partnership NHS Foundation Trust. For services to Adults with Progressive Neurological Conditions.
- Dr. Nicola Joan Bradbear. For services to Biodiversity.
- Sarah Maria Bradbury. Lately Officer, Department for Environment, Food and Rural Affairs. For services to Farming and to the Administration of Justice.
- Julie Brandreth. Lately Headteacher, The County High School, Leftwich, Cheshire. For services to Education.
- Jamie Brenchley. Housing Needs Manager, Isle of Wight Council. For services to Homeless People, particularly during Covid-19.
- Robert Christopher Brewer, DL. Chair, YMCA East Surrey. For charitable services to Young People.
- Dr. David Malcolm Brohn. Founder, E-Training Systems Ltd. For services to Structural Engineering.
- Clifford James Brooks. For services to Visual Arts in Northern Ireland.
- Julia Margaret Brothwell. Global Surge – Programme Management, British Red Cross. For services to International Aid.
- Kevin John Brown. Scientist and Research Leader, Elekta Ltd. For services to Radiotherapy.
- Margaret Anne Brown. Solicitor. For services to Legal Education and to Charity in Northern Ireland.
- Diane Marie Buggy. Midwife, Newcastle upon Tyne Hospitals NHS Foundation Trust. For services to Midwifery and to the community in North East England.
- Dr. Deborah Anne Bullivant. Founder and Chief Executive Officer, Grimm and Co. For services to Children and Young People’s Literacy in Rotherham, South Yorkshire.
- Dr. Chila Kumari Singh Burman. Artist. For services to Visual Art, particularly during Covid-19.
- John Burns. Founder, Burns Pet Nutrition. For services to Business and to the community in West Wales.
- Angela Jane Burns. For Political and Public Service.
- Sandra Burns. Chief Executive, Disability Peterborough. For services to People with Disabilities in Peterborough.
- Camilla Byk. Founder, Podium.me. For services to Young People and to Broadcast Journalism.
- June Eleanor Ann Cairns. Ward Manager, Acute Frailty and Rehabilitation Ward, Lagan Valley Hospital, South Eastern Health and Social Care Trust. For services to Health and Social Care in Northern Ireland.
- Gordon David Cairns. For voluntary services to the community in West Cheshire.
- Mark Caldon. Secretary, UK Spoliation Advisory Panel. For services to Cultural Restoration.
- Patrick Cameron. Hair Stylist. For services to the Hairdressing Industry, particularly during Covid-19.
- Professor Harry Campbell. Professor of Genetic Epidemiology and Public Health, University of Edinburgh. For services to International Child Health and Global Public Health.
- Elizabeth Lorraine Campbell. Interim Chair, Supporting Communities. For services to the community in Northern Ireland.
- David Charles Cane. Governor, Robert Clack School, London Borough of Barking and Dagenham. For services to Education.
- Rachel Carrington. Work Coach Team Leader, Department for Work and Pensions. For services to Unemployed People, particularly during Covid-19.
- George Carr-Williamson. Head of Regional Governance and Local Government (Central Hub), Labour Party. For Political Service.
- Susan Jill Carter. Founder and Chief Executive Officer, Pulp Friction. For services to People with Learning Disabilities.
- Dr. Brian Patrick Caul. For voluntary service to the Royal National Institute for Deaf People in Northern Ireland.
- Angela Chada. Executive Director, Springboard Opportunities Limited. For services to Children and Young People in Northern Ireland.
- Gosbert Chagula. Co-founder, Start-up Discovery School. For services to Business.
- Professor Indranil Chakravorty. Chair, British Association of Physicians of Indian Origin, Institute for Health Research and Consultant Physician, St George’s University Hospitals NHS Foundation Trust. For services to the Healthcare Sector.
- Denise Chevin. For services to the Built Environment.
- Dr. Hse-Hsien Chew. Founder, Proud Voices. For voluntary and charitable services to the LGBTQ+ community.
- Ghazain Choudhry. For services to Wheelchair Basketball.
- Rocio Cifuentes. Chief Executive Officer, Ethnic Minorities and Youth Support Team Wales. For services to the community in Wales.
- Michael James Clark. Head of International Engagement Strategy, COP26 Unit, Cabinet Office. For Public Service.
- Deborah Patricia Clark. Founder and Chief Executive Officer, Community Solutions North West Limited. For services to the community in Lancashire.
- Gillian Anne Sinclair Clarke. Captain, 1st Amesbury Girls’ Brigade Company. For services to Young People and to the community in Amesbury, Wiltshire.
- Dr. Kirsteen Ann Scott Cole. General Practitioner, Skerryvore Medical Practice, Orkney. For services to General Practice and to the community in Orkney during Covid-19.
- Michael Coleman. For services to Ballet.
- Sandra Colston. Musical Director, Funky Voices. For services to Music, to Charity and to the community in East Anglia.
- Graeme Arnold Conley. Manager, Monument View Children’s Home, Sunderland. For services to Children and Young People.
- Catherine Myra Connolly. Headteacher, Brownhill Learning Community. For services to the Education of Disadvantaged and Vulnerable Children and Young People.
- Aodhán Connolly. Lately Director, Northern Ireland Retail Consortium. For services to the Economy.
- Paul Matthew Cook. Principal and Chief Executive, Herewood College. For services to Young People with Special Educational Needs and Disabilities.
- Patricia Sarah Corbett, DL. For services to the community in Belfast.
- Deborah Jessica Corry. For services to Civil Contingency.
- Antony Cotton. For services to the British Army, Personnel and Veterans.
- Benjamin Alex Cowley. Music Therapist. For services to Health and Social Care during the Covid-19.
- Emma Cox. Social Worker, Bedfordshire Council. For services to Child and Family Social Work and to Voluntary Work Overseas.
- Helen Clare Crampton. Head of Safety and Risk Management, Derbyshire Fire and Rescue Service. For services to Safety.
- Barbara Anne Crellin. For services to the community in Rutland.
- Paul Charles Crossman. Lead Staff Officer, Headquarters Regional Command, Combined Cadet Force. For services to Young People.
- Marc Leslie De Cogan Crothall. For services to the Tourism Industry in Scotland.
- Heather Mary Cruickshanks. Leader, Trefoil Guild, Stourbridge. For services to Girlguiding and to Young People.
- Simon Essex Cubitt. Cybercrime Specialist, HM Revenue and Customs. For services to Cyber Security.
- Sheena Hope Cumiskey. Lately Chief Executive, Cheshire and Wirral Partnership NHS Foundation Trust. For services to Mental Health.
- Albert Gordon Cunningham. Chairman, Cunningham Covers Ltd. For services to Economic Development in Northern Ireland.
- Prudence Mary Prior Dailey. Vice-President and lately Chair, Prayer Book Society and Member, General Synod. For services to the Book of Common Prayer.
- Melissa Dark. Casualty Bureau Manager and Disaster Victim Identification Coordinator, City of London Police. For services to Policing.
- Dr. Umakant Ramchandra Dave. Consultant Physician, Swansea Bay University Health Board. For service to the NHS.
- Dr. Nicholas Gregory Davies. Assistant Professor of Mathematical Modelling, London School of Hygiene and Tropical Medicine. For services to the Covid-19 Response.
- Yvonne Jacqueline Davis. Lately Headteacher, Oak View Primary and Nursery School, Hatfield, Hertfordshire. For services to Education.
- Professor Charlotte Mary Deane. Deputy Executive Chair, UK Research and Innovation. For services to Covid-19 Research.
- Francis Ephraim Dempsey. Volunteer, Royal Ulster Constabulary GC. For voluntary and charitable services to Policing and to the community in Northern Ireland.
- Freya Jane Derrick (Freya Dingwall). Founder, Hopscotch Day Nurseries, Hampshire. For services to Early Years Education.
- Julia Margaret Mary Desbruslais. Executive Director, London Mozart Players. For services to Music.
- Alexander Colin Dickson. Owner, Dicksons Roses. For services to Horticulture in Northern Ireland.
- Mark Diplock. Team Leader, Ministry of Defence. For services to Defence.
- Councillor Samantha Kate Dixon. Councillor, Cheshire West and Chester Council. For Political Service.
- Jennifer Carmichael Dodds. Member, British Olympic Curling Team. For services to Curling.
- Susan Doheny. Regional Chief Nurse for South West, NHS England and NHS Improvement. For services to Nursing.
- Annabelle Jean Doherty. Lately Head, Strategy and Policy, Home Office and HM Prison and Probation Service. For services to Law and Order.
- Ian James Donohue. Assistive Technology Subject Matter Expert, Digital and Technology, Ministry of Justice. For services to Inclusion.
- Stephen Frank Drinkwater. Volunteer and Assessor, Duke of Edinburgh’s Award. For services to Young People.
- Mark Frederick Grayson Drummond-Brady. Chairman, Lloyds and City Branch, Royal British Legion. For services to Charitable Fundraising.
- Hailey Caitlin Rose Duff. Member, British Olympic Curling Team. For services to Curling.
- William Robert Leckie Duncan. For services to Curling and to Charity in Perth.
- Sanjeevini Dutta. Director, Kadam Dance. For services to Dance.
- Thomas Scott Dyson. Chief Coach, Paralympic Pathway, British Rowing. For services to Paralympic Rowing.
- David Adam Eastwood. Rough Sleeping Lead, Greater London Authority. For services to Homeless People.
- Colin Best Edgar. Senior Responsible Officer, COP26, Glasgow City Council. For services to Local Government in Glasgow.
- Sarah Louise Edwards. Legal Adviser, National Compliance and Enforcement Service, HM Courts and Tribunals Service. For services to Health and Wellbeing during Covid-19.
- Norman Edwards. Founder, Trustee and Chair, Care Home Volunteers. For services to Care Home Residents during Covid-19.
- Robert Leslie Eggelton. National Chair, Royal Military Police Association. For voluntary services to Army Veterans.
- Sebastian David Elsworth. Chief Executive Officer, Access – The Foundation for Social Investment. For services to Social Investment.
- Charlotte Jane Every. Assistant to the Clerk Assistant, House of Commons. For services to Parliament.
- Peter Martin Fahy. Director of Adult Social Care and Support, Coventry City Council. For services to Local Government and to Vulnerable People.
- Reverend James Bell Falconer. Healthcare Chaplin, NHS Grampian. For services to Parent and Child Bereavement and to the community in Aberdeen, Aberdeenshire and Moray.
- Dr. Isobel Jessie Falconer. Reader of Mathematics, School of Mathematics and Statistics, University of St Andrews. For services to the History of Mathematics and Science.
- Devika Mihiri Anoja Fernando. Research Library Manager, Department for Work and Pensions. For services to International Librarianship.
- John Drummond Frace. For services to Public Health Communication during Covid-19.
- Amerigo Domenico Fragale. Governor, Spalding High School, Lincolnshire. For services to Education.
- Lesley Garven. Centre Manager, Blind Veterans UK, Brighton. For services to Veterans.
- Elizabeth Margaret Gibson. For Political Service.
- Reverend Mervyn Gibson. For services to the community in Northern Ireland.
- Catherine Anne Giel. Lately Director, Communications and Stakeholder Relations, LLWR Ltd. For services to the Nuclear Industry and to the community in West Cumbria.
- Zoe Lesley Golding. Artistic Director, ZoieLogic Dance Theatre. For services to Dance.
- Professor Rachel Louise Gomes. Professor of Water and Resource Processing, Faculty of Engineering, University of Nottingham. For services to Research and to Education.
- Benjamin Neil Good. Customer Charter Business Partner, HM Revenue and Customs. For services to People with Visual Impairments.
- Rebecca Goodrich (Rebecca Friel). Chief Executive Officer, Odd Arts. For services to Education and the community in Manchester.
- Thomas Goodwin. Assistant Director, World Trade Organization Governance and Engagement, Department for International Trade. For services to Trade and to the Guide Dogs for the Blind Association.
- Craig Green. Designer. For services to Fashion.
- Pamela Anne Greig. Headteacher, Pinewood School, West Lothian. For services to Children and Adults with Additional Support Needs.
- Sara Griffiths. For services to Education.
- Paul Trevor Grimwood. Principal Fire Safety Engineer, Kent Fire and Rescue Service. For services to Fire Safety.
- Nicholas Robert Pellew Groves-Raines. Director, Groves-Raines Architects. For services to Architecture, Heritage and Conservation.
- Alexander John Hack. Bioprocess Engineer, Sartorius. For services to the Vaccine and Biopharmaceutical Manufacturing Industry.
- Razia Tariq Hadait. Founder and Chief Executive Officer, Himaya Haven CIC. For services to the community in Birmingham.
- Marilyn Patricia Hahn. Senior Psychosocial Practitioner, British Red Cross. For services to Mental Health and Wellbeing.
- Gary Kenneth Hall. Performance Director, GB Taekwondo. For services to Taekwondo.
- Denise Hamilton. Head, City Services and COP26, Glasgow City Council. For services to Local Government in Glasgow.
- Jane Hamlyn. Potter. For services to Pottery and Ceramics.
- Christina Victoria Handasyde Dick. Chief Executive Officer, Guardian Angel Carers Ltd. For services to Home Care and to Charity, particularly during Covid-19.
- Humera Haqqani. Managing Director, Let’s Talk. For services to Business and to the community in Rochdale.
- Daniel James Hardiman-McCartney. Clinical Adviser, The College of Optometrists. For services to Optometry.
- Dr. Margaret Elizabeth Hardy. For services to the Poultry Industry in Northern Ireland.
- Dr. Clea Elizabeth Harmer. Chief Executive, Sands. For services to Baby Loss Awareness and to Supporting Bereaved Parents.
- Brigadier David Ainsworth Harrison. For services to the community in Hampshire.
- Darren Lee Hart. Head, Data Acquisition and Industry Liaison, Home Office. For services to Trade and Border Security.
- Michael Wilberforce Harvey. Fleet Manager, Abellio London Bus. For services to the Bus Industry.
- Benjamin Robert Hawes. Chair, Athletes Commission, British Olympic Association. For services to Sport.
- Lt Cdr (Retd) Martyn Robert Hawthorn. Chairman, Royal British Legion Scotland. For voluntary service to Veterans and to the community in Scotland.
- Colin Hayburn. Executive Director, Almac. For services to Economic Development and Philanthropy in Northern Ireland.
- Janis Heaney. For services to Public Health in Scotland during Covid-19.
- William Ernest Heap. For voluntary service to the community in Oldham, Greater Manchester.
- Janet Audrey Heap. For voluntary service to the community in Oldham, Greater Manchester.
- Connie Henry. Founder, Track Academy. For charitable services to Young People through Sports and Education.
- Dolores Letitia Henry-Jenkins (Dollie Henry). For services to Dance.
- Brenda Herron. Lately Chief Commissioner, Girlguiding Ulster. For services to Young People.
- Leah Dorothy Higginbottom. Local Ward and Parish Councillor, Barnsley Metropolitan Borough Council and Great Houghton Parish Council. For public and voluntary service in Barnsley, South Yorkshire.
- Marcia-Yvette Hinkson-Gittens. Police Staff, South Wales Police. For services to Diversity in Policing.
- Siân Holleran. Project Manager (International), Colleges Wales. For services to Education.
- Irene Holmes. Volunteer and Group Organiser, Riding for the Disabled. For services to People with Disabilities in Arundel, West Sussex.
- Lyn Dyer Hopkins. Trustee and Chair, Board of Trustees, The Victoria League for Commonwealth Friendship. For services to Commonwealth Students in the UK.
- Nicholas Adrian Horst. Helicopter Aircrew, Her Majesty's Coastguard. For services to Search and Rescue.
- Charlotte Sara Hosker. Prison Education Manager, HM Prison and Young Offender Institution Askham Grange. For services to Prison Education and Reducing Re-Offending.
- Andrew Rhys Howell. For services to Frontline Workers during Covid-19.
- Caroline Howell. Director, Foundling Museum. For services to Museums.
- Professor Joanne Elizabeth Hughes. Director, Centre for Shared Education, Queen’s University Belfast. For services to Education and to the community in Northern Ireland.
- Elizabeth Ellen Hughes. Director of Special Projects, Sport England. For services to Sport during Covid-19.
- Elizabeth Janice Hulme. University Secretary and Vice Principal, Glasgow Caledonian University. For services to Higher Education in Scotland.
- Kevin Hunt. Head of Business Engagement, Department for Business, Energy and Industrial Strategy. For services to Tackling Climate Change.
- Susan Hunter. Foster Carer, City of Edinburgh Council. For services to Children.
- Zdenka Husserl. Volunteer, Holocaust Memorial Day Trust. For services to Holocaust Education.
- Timothy Philip Maxwell Irwin. Director, Northern Ireland Environment Agency, Department of Agriculture, Environment and Rural Affairs, Northern Ireland Executive. For Public Service.
- Lorna Petrova Jackson. Headteacher, Maryland Primary School, London Borough of Newham. For services to Education.
- Safia Jama. Chief Executive Officer, Women’s Inclusive Team. For services to the Voluntary and Charitable Sector.
- Roy Anthony Jarratt, JP. District Manager, Warwickshire and Coventry, St John Ambulance. For voluntary services to St John Ambulance in the West Midlands.
- Keith Jarrett. Police Staff, British Transport Police. For services to Policing and to Diversity.
- Chrisann Suzanne Jarrett. Chief Executive Officer, We Belong. For services to Children and Young Adults.
- Jeanefer Jean-Charles. Choreographer. For services to Dance.
- Tinuade Jegede (Tina Jegede). Lead Nurse for Care Home Quality, Standards and Assurance, London Borough of Islington. For services to Social Care.
- Ameet Jogia. Councillor, London Borough of Harrow and Co-chair, Conservative Friends of India. For Political and Public Service.
- Shaun Philip Johnson. Lately Arson Taskforce Coordinator, Northamptonshire Police. For services to Policing.
- Rebecca Jones. Volunteers and Access Lead, Cotswolds National Landscape. For services to Volunteering and to the Environment.
- Jane Margaret Jones. Head of Public Affairs, Great Western Railway. For services to the Railway Industry.
- Michelle Susan Jones. Headteacher, Landsdowne Primary School, Canton, Cardiff. For services to Education, particularly during Covid-19.
- Elizabeth Jones. Chair of Governors, St Damian's Science College, Ashton-under-Lyne, Tameside, Greater Manchester. For services to Education.
- Mary Paula Jordan. Principal, Sperrinview Special School, Dungannon, County Tyrone. For services to Education in Northern Ireland.
- Dr. Manojkumar Narottam Liladhar Joshi, DL. Volunteer. For voluntary services to the community in Bradford during Covid-19.
- Chunilal Odhavji Kakad. For services to the community in the London Borough of Brent.
- Dr. Andrew Miles Kaye. Head of Covid-19 Advice, Government Office for Science. For services to Global Resilience and Crisis Management.
- Ann Tavener Keable. Patron, Home-Start Norfolk. For services to Children in Norfolk.
- Eileen Kelly-McGregor. Chair, Board of Trustees, Army Widows Association. For voluntary service to Bereaved Families.
- Najma Khalid. Founder, Women's CHAI Project and Lead Organiser, Parent Power Oldham. For services to the community in Oldham.
- Zamir Khan. Community Volunteer. For services to the Blackburn Muslim Burial Society and to the community in Blackburn, Lancashire, particularly during Covid-19.
- Elizabeth Nicol King. Principal Educational Psychologist, South Lanarkshire Council. For services to Children and Families.
- Philip John King. Founder, South Derbyshire Music Centre. For voluntary services to the community in Derbyshire.
- Samantha May Kinghorn. Para Athlete. For services to Disability Sport.
- Linda Christine Kirby. Councillor, London Borough of Merton. For services to the community in South London.
- Richard David John Kirkpatrick. For services to the Equine Sector in Northern Ireland.
- Dr. Barry Klaassen. Team Leader, Scotland Emergency Medicine – Malawi Project and Chief Medical Adviser, British Red Cross. For services to Overseas Healthcare.
- Charlotte Kneer, DL. Chief Executive Officer, Reigate and Banstead Women’s Aid. For services to Victims of Domestic Abuse in Surrey.
- Angela Eugenie Knight Jackson. Deputy Director for Nursing Professional Development, NHS England and NHS Improvement. For services to the NHS, specifically to the Nursing and Midwifery Workforce.
- Sevcan Dudu. Diversity and Inclusion Lead, HMP and YOI Bedford. For services to Prisoners and to Refugees.
- Dr. Mick John Kumwenda. For services to Medicine.
- Barjinderpall Lall. Head of Skills, JGA Group, London. For services to Apprenticeships and Skills Training.
- Tiffany Marie Langford. Deployed Caseworker, Ministry of Defence. For Public Service.
- Claire Lavelle. Founder, Hive of Wellbeing. For services to the Wellbeing of Students, Teachers and Staff in Education.
- Stephen Nicholas Lawlor. Foster Carer, West Sussex County Council. For services to Children.
- Deborah Ann Lawlor. Foster Carer, West Sussex County Council. For services to Children.
- Andrew John Lawrence. Teacher, Hampton School, Hampton, London Borough of Richmond. For services to Holocaust and Genocide Education.
- Stephanie Lawrence. Executive Director, Nursing and Allied Health Professionals, Leeds Community Healthcare NHS Trust. For services to District Nursing.
- Chloe Lawson. Member, Scottish Sports Futures. For services to Vulnerable and Disadvantaged Young People in West Scotland.
- Bettina Leslie. Founder and Operational Manager, Freedom4Girls. For services to Tackling Period Poverty.
- Dr. Gwyneth Lewis. Poet. For services to Literature.
- Barbara Hilary Lewis. For services to the Royal National Institute for Deaf People and the Health and Social Care Sector in Northern Ireland.
- Emma Jayne Lewis. Chair, The Roots Foundation Wales. For voluntary services to Young People in Swansea.
- Margaret Ann Paterson Lewisohn. Founder, Marryat Players. For services to Young People.
- Kevan John Liles. Chief Executive, Voluntary Action Leicestershire. For services to the Voluntary Sector.
- James Lindsay. For voluntary service to Education in Killyleagh, County Down.
- Christine Joan Lindsay. Community Champion. For voluntary and charitable services to the community in the London Borough of Sutton, particularly with Older People.
- Matthew David Littleford. Chair, The Reading Agency. For services to Literature.
- Elizabeth Lorraine Llewellyn. Classical Musician. For services to Music.
- Robert Joseph Lodge. Vice Chair and Trustee, Red Cypher Charity. For services to Veterans and their Families.
- Michael Matthew Loomes. Founder and Curator, The Story of Scouting Museum. For voluntary services to Young People and to the community in Lancashire.
- June Love. Community Relations Manager, Dounreay Site Restoration Limited. For services to the Nuclear Industry and to the community in Caithness and North Sutherland.
- Dr. Angus George Lunn. Vice President, Northumberland Wildlife Trust. For services to Education and to Peatland Conservation.
- John Jamieson MacLennan. Chair, Lifeboat Management Group, Stornoway Lifeboat Station. For voluntary services to the Royal National Lifeboat Institution.
- Nitin Natwarlal Madhavji (Nick Madhavji). Founder and Chief Executive, Joskos Solutions Ltd. For services to Education, to Business and to Charity.
- Sandeep Mahal. Lately Director, Nottingham UNESCO City of Literature. For services to Literature, the Arts and Culture in Nottingham.
- Mark Alexander Malone. Event Manager, Cabinet Office. For services to the Delivery of COP26.
- John Neil Maltby. Lately Trust Board Volunteer, National Citizen Service. For services to Young People.
- Maxwell Christopher Graham Manley. Head of Dental Department, Royal Hospital for Neuro-Disability. For services to Dentistry.
- Timothy Mann. National Volunteer Police Cadets Coordinator. For services to Young People.
- Catherine Mann. Head of Libraries and Arts, Staffordshire County Council. For services to Public Libraries.
- Jonathan Manns. Lately Executive Director, Rockwell. For services to Planning, Real Estate and to Built Environments.
- Ella Elizabeth Marks. For services to the community in the London Borough of Ealing.
- Sue Marooney. Chief Executive Officer, Durrington Multi Academy Trust, and Headteacher, Durrington High School, West Sussex. For services to Education.
- Austin Philip Marsden. Lately Founder and Executive Chair, Ridgeway Partners. For services to Business and to Charity.
- Kay Martin. Principal, Cardiff and Vale College. For services to Education in Wales.
- Clare Rosemary Martin. Chief Executive Officer, Pompey in Community. For services to the community in Portsmouth.
- Lissa Kate Matthews. Lately Principal Private Secretary and Head of Private Office, Crown Prosecution Service. For services to Law and Order.
- Thomas Hugh Maxwell. For services to Floristry and to Charity in Edinburgh.
- Christine May. Head, Libraries at Bradford. For services to Public Libraries.
- Shirley McCay. For services to Hockey and to the community in Northern Ireland.
- James McClean. Chair, Ballymena and District Branch, Parkinson’s UK. For services to People with Parkinson’s in County Antrim.
- Josephine Anne McConaghy. For services to Vulnerable Families in the Lisburn Area.
- Professor Robert Lee McGreevy. Chairman, League of Advanced European Neutron Sources. For services to Science.
- Samuel Thomas McGregor. Member, Governing Body, North West Regional College. For services to Further Education and to the community in Northern Ireland.
- John Andrew McIlmoyle. Vice-Principal, Longstone Special School, Dundonald, Belfast. For services to Education and to Children with Special Educational Needs.
- Cherry Lucy McKean. For services to the community in Earls Colne, Essex during Covid-19.
- Dr. Moira Fay McKenna, DL. Chief Commissioner, Girlguiding Scotland. For services to Young People.
- Stuart McLellan. Co-founder, Neilston and Uplawmoor First Responders. For voluntary and charitable services in Renfrewshire.
- Lynn Elizabeth McManus. Founder, Pathways4All and The Tim Lamb Children's Centre. For services to Children with Disabilities.
- Laura Elizabeth Rose McMillan. Director of Audience Strategy, Coventry City of Culture Trust. For services to Culture and to the community in Coventry.
- Dr. Elaine McNaughton (Elaine Campbell). Lately Senior Partner, Carnoustie Medical Group. For services to General Practice and GP Training in Scotland.
- Dr. Mary Ruth McQuillan. Senior Lecturer, Usher Institute, University of Edinburgh. For services to Science during Covid-19.
- Ian Richard Mean. For services to the community in Gloucestershire.
- Patricia Anne Mensforth. Clinical Dietetic Manager, Leicestershire Home Enteral Nutrition Service, Leicestershire Partnership NHS Trust. For services to Dietetics.
- Leslie Micklethwaite. For voluntary and charitable services to the community in North Lancashire and South Cumbria.
- Hannah Louise Miley. For services to Swimming and to Women in Sport.
- Julia Ingrid Millard. Chair of Governors, Langley Moor Nursery, Langley Moor Primary School and Durham Community Business College. For services to Education.
- Dr. Ian Stuart Miller. Lately Chief Medical Officer, British Paralympic Association. For services to Paralympic Sport.
- James Philip Milner. For services to Association Football and to Charity.
- Elaine Samantha Mitchener. Musician. For services to Music.
- Kiritkumar Jamnadas Modi (Kirit Modi). Honorary President, National Kidney Federation and the National Black Asian and Minority Ethnic Transplant Alliance. For services to Organ Donation particularly in Ethnic Minority Communities.
- David Trevor Molyneux. Councillor and Leader, Wigan Metropolitan Borough Council. For services to Local Government and to the community in Wigan.
- Gillian Elizabeth Montgomery. Speech and Language Therapist, Northern Health and Social Care Trust. For services to Healthcare in Northern Ireland.
- Francesca Moody. Co-Founder, Fleabag for Charity, Fleabag Support Fund and Shedinburgh Fringe Festival. For services to Charitable Fundraising for the Arts during Covid-19.
- Stanley Watt Morrice. For services to the Food and Drink Sector in Scotland.
- Captain Michael Morris. Chairman, United Kingdom Maritime Pilots Association. For services to Maritime Industry.
- Hugh Morris. Chief Executive, Glamorgan County Cricket Club. For services to Cricket and to Charity.
- Ann-Maree Morrison. For services to Women in Business and to the Economy.
- Odette Michelle Mould. Founder, Harry’s Rainbow. For services to Bereaved Children and Families in Milton Keynes, Buckinghamshire.
- Sean Daniel Mullan. For services to the Northern Ireland Ambulance Service.
- Sarah Mullin. For services to Education.
- Professor Srimathi Rajagopalan Murali. Consultant Orthopaedic Surgeon, Wrightington, Wigan and Leigh Teaching Hospitals NHS Foundation Trust. For services to International Doctors working in the NHS.
- David Matthew Murdoch. Head Coach, British Curling Team. For services to Curling.
- Adam Dominic Murphy. Co-founder and Chief Executive Officer, Shnuggle. For services to the Economy in Northern Ireland.
- Professor Daljit Nagra. Chair, Royal Society of Literature. For services to Literature.
- Dawn Christina Nanton. Operational Business Manager, Crown Prosecution Service, London. For services to Law and Order.
- Dr. Claudia Natanson. Chair, UK Cyber Security Council. For services to Cyber Security.
- Verity Leigh Naylor. Director of Operations, British Paralympic Association. For services to Paralympic Sport.
- Donna Patricia Neely-Hayes. Headteacher, Denbigh High School, Luton, Bedfordshire. For services to Education.
- Ross Nelson. Co-Founder, Neilston and Uplawmoor First Responders. For voluntary and charitable services in Renfrewshire.
- Philip Brian Newman. Lately Senior Marine Environmental Assessment Officer, Natural Resources Wales. For services to Marine Conservation.
- Charlotte Julia Nichols. Co-Founder, Spennylmypics. For services to the Motor Neurone Disease Association.
- Margaret Erskine Nicoll. Lately Resilience Learning Programme Manager, Scottish Government. For Public Service.
- Mandy Nyarko. Co-Founder, Start-up Discovery School. For services to Business.
- Nancy O'Neill. Deputy Chief Officer and Strategic Director of Transformation and Change, Bradford District and Craven Clinical Commissioning Group. For services to the NHS, particularly during Covid-19.
- Philip Alexander O'Neill. Chief Operating Officer, Translink. For services to Sustainable and Accessible Transport in Northern Ireland.
- Isabel Oakley-Chapman. For services to the community in the London Borough of Wandsworth, during Covid-19.
- Andrew Onwubolu. Actor and Director. For services to Drama and Music.
- Edward Orr. Officer, National Crime Agency. For services to Law Enforcement.
- Prudencia Paul Orridge. Threat Lead, Fraud Investigation Service, HM Revenue and Customs. For services to Diversity.
- Helen Joy Osborn. Lately Director of Library Services, Libraries NI. For services to Public Libraries.
- Yemisi Osho. For services to the NHS and to the community in the London Borough of Waltham Forest, particularly during Covid-19.
- Claire Angela Osment. Chair, Ongoing Women's Local Support. For services to Victims of Domestic Abuse in Stockport.
- Dr. Marion Oswald. For services to Digital Innovation.
- Rebecca Owen. Customer Service Leader, Department for Work and Pensions. For Public Service.
- Elizabeth Ekeleoseye Owolabi. For voluntary and charitable services in Manchester.
- Kenneth George Pacey. Councillor, Syston Town Council and Charnwood Borough Council, Leicestershire. For services to Local Government.
- Tracy Lynne Paine. Lately Deputy Chief Executive, Belong. For services to Dementia Care.
- Stuart Parker. Councillor, Cheshire West and Chester Council. For services to Local Government.
- Glenn Gerald Parkes. For services to Homeless People and to the community in Fenton, Stoke on-Trent.
- Badrun Nesa Pasha. Co-founder, Bangladeshi Women’s Association. For services to the Bangladeshi community in the West Midlands.
- Sharan Pasricha. Founder, Ennismore. For services to the Hotel Industry.
- Kawan Deepakchandra Patel. Lately Deputy Director, Head of Social Contact, Cabinet Office and Covid-19 Directorate Lead, Home Office. For services to the Covid-19 Response.
- Bhawana Ramanbhai Patel. Human Resources Consultant, Defence Business Services, Ministry of Defence. For services to Defence.
- Bharat Patel. For services to the community in Greater London, particularly during Covid-19.
- Patrick Geoffrey Peal, DL. Lately Chief Executive, East Anglian Air Ambulance. For services to Emergency Care in the East of England.
- Professor Nicholas Sheridan Peirce. Chief Medical Officer, England and Wales Cricket Board. For services to Sport during Covid-19.
- Howard Stephen Perlin. Trustee, British Forces Broadcasting Service. For voluntary service to Broadcasting.
- Philip William Phillips. New Media Development Manager, National Museums Liverpool. For services to Museums and Science.
- Professor Elizabeth Ruth Plummer. Professor of Experimental Cancer Medicine, Translational and Clinical Research Institute, Newcastle University. For services to Medicine.
- Alexandra Ella Podmore. Materials Engineer, McLaren Automotive Ltd. For services to Engineering, to Innovation and to Diversity.
- Daniel Kwadwo Poku. Co-founder, Tim and Danny Music. For services to Music.
- Lieutenant Colonel Glyn Richard Potts, DL. For services to Education and to the Army Cadet Force.
- Russell Powell. Classical Cellist. For services to music.
- Natalie Queiroz. Director, Inspire 2 Quit Blades. For services to Young People and the Prevention of Knife Crime.
- Robert Crispin George Quest. Head of Animal Reception Centre, London Heathrow Airport. For services to Animal Health and Welfare.
- Pauline Perpetua Quirke. Actor, Founder and Head Principal, The Pauline Quirke Academy. For services to Young People, to the Entertainment Industry and to Charity.
- Dr. Chithra Ramakrishnan. South Indian Classical Vocalist and Dancer, and Founder Director, British Carnatic Choir. For services to the Promotion of South Indian Classical Music and Dance.
- Suleman Raza. Founder and Chief Executive Officer, Spice Village. For services to Business and Philanthropy, particularly during Covid-19.
- Jane Ann Redrup (Jayne Redrup). Head of Office for Nuclear Regulation Sponsorship Team, Department for Business, Energy and Industrial Strategy. For services to Diversity and Inclusion.
- Dr. Keith Reid. Director of Public Health, Swansea Bay University Health Board. For services to the NHS during Covid-19.
- Ailsa Rhodes. Chief Executive Officer, Older People's Action in the Locality. For services to Older People in Leeds, particularly during Covid-19.
- Gabrielle Jill Richards. Professional Head of Occupational Therapy and Allied Health Professionals, South London and Maudsley NHS Foundation Trust. For services to Mental Health.
- Marcia Richards. Case Lead, Local Authority Analysis and Engagement, Education and Skills Funding Agency. For services to Education.
- Joanna Richardson. For services to Affordable Rural Housing.
- Brian John Roberts. Work Group Leader, Child Maintenance Group, Department for Work and Pensions. For voluntary and charitable service.
- Brigid Robinson. Managing Director, Coram Voice and Young People’s Programmes. For services to Children and Young People.
- Colin William Rodham. Senior Officer, Environment Agency. For services to Flood Risk Management in the Yorkshire Region.
- Adam Rogers. Team Leader, Ministry of Defence. For services to Defence.
- Alan Roderick Rough. For services to Association Football and to Charity in Scotland.
- Gregory Michael Rowland. Master Wheelwright. For services to Heritage Crafts.
- Eilish Rutherford. For services to Sport and to Charity in Northern Ireland.
- Faith Anne Rutterford. Secretary to the Commander, 100th Civil Engineer Squadron, US Air Force, RAF Mildenhall. For Public Service.
- Andrew Peter Ryan. Executive Director, Association of Summer Olympic International Federations. For services to Sport.
- Douglas Gordon Samuel. Lately Chief Executive Officer, Spartans Community Football Academy. For services to Association Football and to the community in North Edinburgh.
- Lynnette Margaret Sanders. Chief Executive, Swansea Women's Aid. For services to Victims of Domestic Abuse in Swansea.
- Gurvinder Singh Sandher. Chief Executive Officer, Cohesion Plus. For services to the Arts and to the community in Kent.
- Harshad Purshottam Saujani, JP. Community Safety Educator, Leicestershire Fire and Rescue Service. For services to Fire Safety.
- Pamela Jean Scarry. Head of Development, Continuous Improvement Service, HM Revenue and Customs. For Public Service.
- Valerie Patricia Ellen Scott. Debt Recovery Officer, Defence Business Services, Ministry of Defence. For services to Defence.
- Georgina Claire Seccombe (Georgina Harland). Chef de Mission, Team GB, Olympic Games 2022. For services to Olympic Sport.
- Mark Anthony Selby. For services to Snooker and to Charity.
- Christopher Edward Self. For services to Agriculture and to the community in Norfolk.
- Caroline Alexandra Patricia Seligman, DL. For services to the Arts and to the community in Banffshire.
- Eleanor Rachel Semlyen. Founding Trustee, Yorkshire Air Museum and Allied Air Forces Memorial, Elvington, York. For services to Heritage.
- Virginia Sentance. Senior Policy Adviser, Cabinet Office. For services to the Delivery of COP26.
- Helen Mary Setterfield. Chair, OGCancerNI. For services to Patients and Families affected by Oesophago-Gastric Cancer.
- Angela Shiel. Foster Carer, Salford City Council. For services to Fostering.
- Julie Shield. Registered Manager, Abbeyvale Care Centre. For services to Nursing in Social Care.
- Suman Raj Shrestha. Professional Lead, Royal College of Nursing and Nurse Consultant in Critical Care, Frimley Health NHS Foundation Trust. For services to Critical Care Nursing.
- Dr. Kenneth Montgomery Simpson. Chief Executive, Voluntary Services Aberdeen. For services to People with Disabilities in North East Scotland.
- Neil Douglas Hamilton Simpson. Para Alpine Skier. For services to Skiing.
- Andrew William Ramsay Simpson. Para Alpine Skier. For services to Skiing.
- Stephanie Ann Sirr. Chief Executive Officer, Nottingham Playhouse. For services to the Arts.
- Christopher John Slater. Associate Director of Commercial and Procurement, Leeds Teaching Hospitals NHS Trust. For services to NHS Procurement during Covid-19.
- Michael Harold Speed Sly. Chairman, English Mustard Growers. For services to Agriculture in East Anglia.
- Walter Cunningham Peyton Smith. Lately Chair, Prince’s Trust Ayrshire. For services to Youth Enterprise and Education in Ayrshire.
- Roy Duncan Smith. Lately Fisheries Policy Adviser, Department for Environment, Food and Rural Affairs. For services to Conservation.
- Mili Smith. Member, British Olympic Curling Team. For services to Curling.
- His Honour David William Smyth, QC. For services to the community in Northern Ireland.
- Lynn Patricia Spillett. Chair, Torbay Lifeboat Fundraisers. For voluntary services to the Royal National Lifeboat Institution.
- Hugo Ronald Allan Spowers. Founder, Riversimple. For services to Technology.
- Diane Elizabeth Steel. Executive Assistant, Prime Minister’s Office. For Public Service.
- Stephen Connell Stewart. Director of Sport and Exercise, University of St Andrews. For services to Sport.
- David Arthur Stewart. Chief Operating Officer, Wood plc. For services to British Industry.
- John Henry Stracey. For services to Charitable Fundraising.
- Richard Michael Stroud. For services to the Interfaith Community in West Yorkshire.
- Dr. Rupert John Suckling. Director of Public Health, Doncaster Council. For services to Public Health during Covid-19.
- Gaynor Sullivan (Bonnie Tyler). For services to Music.
- Iris Muriel Sumption. Work Coach, Department for Work and Pensions. For services to Vulnerable People.
- Adam Douglas Percy Sutherland. Director, Grizedale Arts. For services to Art.
- Jacqueline Helen Sutton. Lately Chief Customer Officer, Civil Aerospace, Rolls-Royce. For services to the Economy.
- Samantha Tatlow. Creative Diversity Partner, ITV. For services to People with Disabilities.
- Maura Rose Teager. Lead Governor, University Hospitals of Derby and Burton NHS Foundation Trust. For services to the Nursing Profession and to the community in Derby.
- Rhys David Thomas. Deployed Caseworker, Ministry of Defence. For Public Service.
- Catherine Thomas. Teacher, Sidney Stringer Academy, Coventry. For services to Education and to the community in Coventry.
- Aisha Simone Lolita Thomas. Founder, Representation Matters. For services to Education.
- Kate Thompson. Head of Extra Care Services, Joseph Rowntree Housing Trust. For services to Social Care.
- Dr. Erin Hope Thompson. Founder and Director, The Loss Foundation. For services to Bereaved Families.
- Janet Mary Thornton. For services to Rural Communities in Yorkshire.
- Dr. Richard Michael Tipper. Lead Author, Report of the Intergovernmental Panel on Climate Change. For services to Science and to the Environment.
- John Douglas Torode. Chef and Broadcaster. For services to Food and to Charity.
- Karen Trainer. Volunteer Centre Manager, Big Venture Centre. For services to the community in Wolverhampton, particularly during Covid-19.
- Russell Tripp. Team Leader, Ministry of Defence. For services to Defence.
- Sujitha Trowsdale. Senior Officer, National Crime Agency. For services to Law Enforcement.
- Judd Trump. For services to Snooker and to Charity.
- Professor Cherry Jane Tweed. Chief Scientific Adviser for Radioactive Waste Management Ltd. For services to the Nuclear Industry.
- Judith Anne Twigg. Lately Councillor, Derbyshire County Council. For services to Local Government.
- Anwar Uddin. Fans For Diversity Campaign Manager, The Football Supporters' Association. For services to Association Football.
- Melanie Helen Susan Unwin. Deputy Curator of Works of Art and Head of Interpretation, House of Commons. For services to Parliament.
- Angela Usher. For voluntary services to Disadvantaged Young People through Music.
- Georgina Astrid Usher. Chief Executive, British Fencing. For services to Fencing.
- Sanjaykumar Jayantilal Vadera. Chief Executive Officer, The Fragrance Shop and Per-Scent. For services to International Trade.
- Jasmin Vardimon. Choreographer. For services to Dance.
- Judith Penelope Vaughan (Jay Vaughan). Co-founder and Chief Executive Officer, Family Futures CIC. For services to Children and Young People.
- Dr. Valerie Lemorn Vaughan-Dick. Chief Operating Officer, Royal College of General Practitioners. For services to General Practice and to Ethnic Minority Communities.
- Dr. Nikita Kirit Ved. Research Fellow and Lecturer in Medicine, University of Oxford. For services to the Covid-19 Response.
- Diane Vernon. Founder and Chief Executive Officer, EmployabilityUK. For services to Disadvantaged Young People.
- Ameeta Virk. Markets Leader, Department for International Trade. For services to the Economy.
- David Wakelin. Lately Director, Nottingham and Nottinghamshire Violence Reduction Unit. For services to Young People in Nottinghamshire.
- Grace Patricia Wales Bonner. Designer. For services to Fashion.
- Edward Walker. Founder and Chief Executive, Hope into Action. For services to Tackling Homelessness.
- Gregg Wallace. Writer and Broadcaster. For services to Food and to Charity.
- Robert Paul Warman. Senior Anchorman, ITV. For services to Broadcasting and Journalism in the West Midlands.
- Angus Roderick Watson. Director of Engineering and Supply, Royal National Lifeboat Institution. For services to Marine Safety and to Charity.
- Linda Elizabeth Watson. Founder and Director, Youth Connection Theatre Company. For services to the community in Chester-le-Street, County Durham.
- Valerie Mary Watson. Welfare Office Manager, The Queen’s Own Gurkha Logistic Regiment. For services to Soldiers and their Families.
- Dr. Adrian Vivian Weller. Board Member, Centre for Data Ethics and Innovation. For services to Digital Innovation.
- John Douglas Wellingham. Founder, The John Loosemore Centre. For services to Early Music Education.
- Angela Whelan. Assistant Director, International Engagement and Protocol, Department for International Trade. For services to Trade and Investment.
- Tracy Whittaker-Smith. Head National Coach, Trampoline, British Gymnastics. For services to Trampolining.
- Fiona Whyte. For voluntary service to the Public and Commercial Services Union in Wales.
- Elizabeth Wilkinson. Founder, Dyslexic Dyslexia Consultant. For services to People with Dyslexia.
- Nigel Wilkinson. Managing Director, Windermere Lake Cruises Ltd. For services to Tourism and to the Economy in Cumbria.
- David Brynmor Williams. For services to Sport and to Charity in Wales.
- Janet Williams. Co-founder, Independent Fetal Anti-Convulsant Trust. For services to People with Disabilities.
- Virginia Jill Williams-Ellis. Founder, Read Easy UK. For services to Education.
- Susan Lesley Williamson. National Director, Libraries, Arts Council England. For services to the Library Sector.
- Susan Elizabeth Wills. Assistant Director, Lifelong Learning and Culture, Surrey County Council. For services to Public Libraries.
- Paul Martin Wilson. Executive Director, TIN Arts. For services to Dance and to Inclusion in the Performing Arts Sector.
- Gail Jacqueline Winter. For Public Service and services to the community in the London Borough of Croydon.
- Peter David Woods, DL. For charitable and voluntary services to the community in Liverpool.
- Timothy Philip Woodward. Founder and Chief Executive Officer, The Country Food Trust and Trustee, The Spinal Muscular Atrophy Trust. For services to Charity, particularly during Covid-19.
- Helen Worth (Helen Dawson). Actress. For services to Drama.
- Dr. Peter John Wright. Leader, Ecology and Conservation Group, Marine Scotland Science. For services to Science.
- Douglas Robertson Wright, DL. For services to the Economy and to Charity in the West Midlands.
- Paul Anthony Wright. Station Manager, British Forces Broadcasting Service. For services to the Armed Forces.
- Victoria Wright. Vice Skip, British Olympic Curling Team. For services to Curling.
- Rukhsana Yaqoob. Education Consultant. For services to Education.
- Richard James Gregg Yarr. For services to Music in Northern Ireland.
- Sally Anne Yeoman. Chief Executive Officer, Halton and St Helens Voluntary and Community Action. For services to the community in Halton, Cheshire.
- Julie McDonald Young. For services to Dance and to Young People in Perth.

=== British Empire Medal (BEM) ===
British Empire Medal ribbon

=== Royal Red Cross ===
Royal Red Cross ribbon

==== Members of the Royal Red Cross (RRC) ====
- Lieutenant Colonel Lynn Strachan Adam, ARRC, Queen Alexandra's Royal Army Nursing Corps, Army Reserve
- Lieutenant Colonel Margaret Rose Kathleen Durrant, TD VR, Queen Alexandra's Royal Army Nursing Corps, Army Reserve
- Group Captain Diane Wendy Lamb
- Wing Commander Nina Louise Rose

==== Associates of the Royal Red Cross (ARRC) ====
- Lieutenant Frederick Joseph Miller, Queen Alexandra's Royal Naval Nursing Service
- Wing Commander Eleanor Catherine Hereford

=== Queen's Police Medal (QPM) ===
Queen's Police Medal ribbon

England and Wales

- Antony Ashton. Sergeant, West Midlands Police.
- Rachel Alison Barber. Deputy Chief Constable, Nottinghamshire Police.
- Sarah Jane Crew. Chief Constable, Avon and Somerset Police.
- Matthew Howard Evans. Constable, West Midlands Police.
- Karen Marie Geddes. Lately, Superintendent, West Midlands Police.
- Timothy James Gray. Lately, Detective Superintendent, Metropolitan Police Service.
- Catherine Hankinson. Assistant Chief Constable, West Yorkshire Police.
- William Alexander Jephson. Deputy Chief Constable, Hertfordshire Constabulary.
- Pamela Charlotte Kelly. Chief Constable, Gwent Police.
- Glen Mayhew. Assistant Chief Constable, Devon and Cornwall Police.
- James McAllister. Constable, Metropolitan Police Service.
- Ian McDonald. Constable, Northamptonshire Police.
- Timothy James Needham. Superintendent, Civil Nuclear Constabulary.
- Simon Samuel Nelson. Superintendent, Sussex Police.
- Michael Anthony Wallace. Constable, Metropolitan Police Service.
- Victoria Rose Washington. Lately, Detective Superintendent, Metropolitan Police Service.
- Clifton John Williams. Lately, Detective Chief Inspector, Merseyside Police.
- Lisa Jayne Winward. Chief Constable, North Yorkshire Police.

Northern Ireland

- Grahame Wilson Sillery. Detective Constable, Police Service of Northern Ireland.
- Richard Samuel Taylor. Constable, Police Service of Northern Ireland.
- Darren Welsh. Sergeant, Police Service of Northern Ireland.

=== Queen's Fire Service Medal (QFSM) ===
Queen's Fire Service Medal ribbon

England and Wales

- Michael David Crennell. Lately, Chief Fire Officer and Chief Executive, Avon Fire and Rescue Service.
- Stephen Owen-Hughes, MBE. Chief Fire Officer, Surrey Fire and Rescue Service.
- Timothy John Murrell. Drone Manager, Lancashire Fire and Rescue Service.
- Neil Ian Odin. Chief Fire Officer, Hampshire and Isle of Wight Fire and Rescue Service.

=== Queen's Ambulance Medal (QAM) ===
Queen's Ambulance Medal ribbon

England and Wales

- Cherylene Teresa Camps. Paramedic, East Midlands Ambulance Service.
- Jeffrey Robert Price. Learning and Development Manager, Welsh Ambulance Service.
- Richard Andrew Webb-Stevens. Clinical Team Manager, Motorcycle Response Unit, London Ambulance Service.

Northern Ireland

- Alwyn Craig Wilson. Emergency Medical Technician and Hospital Ambulance Liaison Officer, Northern Ireland Ambulance Service

=== Queen's Volunteer Reserves Medal (QVRM) ===
Queen's Volunteer Reserves Medal ribbon

- Warrant Officer 1 Andrew Walker, VR, Royal Naval Reserve
- Lieutenant Colonel Kathleen Ann Higgins, VR, Queen Alexandra's Royal Army Nursing Corps, Army Reserve
- Lieutenant Colonel Simon Charles Hunt, VR, Royal Corps of Signals, Army Reserve
- Major Lee Paul Patchell, VR, Royal Regiment of Artillery, Army Reserve
- Warrant Officer Class 2 Paul Stevens, VR, The Parachute Regiment, Army Reserve
- Squadron Leader Michael James Cairns
- Wing Commander Howard Stanley Leader

== Crown Dependencies ==
Guernsey

- Peter Harwood OBE
- Jack Honeybill MBE
- Marlene Place BEM
- Tina Pipet MVO

Jersey

- Timothy Le Cocq, Bailiff of Jersey, Knight Bachelor
- Anthony Olsen, Jurat, MBE
- Vic Tanner Davy MBE
- Toni Roberts MBE
- Michael Van Neste MBE
- Barbara Ball BEM
- Joan Tapley BEM

Isle of Man

- Pamela Crowe MBE
- Frank Horne MBE
- Paul Healey BEM

== Australia ==
The 2022 Queen's Birthday Honours for Australia were announced on 13 June 2022 by the Governor-General, David Hurley.

== New Zealand ==
The 2022 Queen's Birthday Honours for New Zealand were announced on 6 June 2022 by the Governor-General, Dame Cindy Kiro.

== Cook Islands ==
Below are the individuals appointed by Elizabeth II in her right as Queen of the Cook Islands, on the recommendation of the Ministers of the Cook Islands.

=== Order of the British Empire ===
==== Officer of the Order of the British Empire (OBE) ====
- Tekaotiki Matapo. For services to the Community and to Public Service.

==== Member of the Order of the British Empire (MBE) ====
- Bishop Tutai O Marama Maao-Tino Pere. For services to the Church and to the Community.

=== British Empire Medal (BEM) ===
- Mitaera Ngatae Teatuakaro Michael Tavioni. For services to the Pacific Arts and to the Community.

== The Bahamas ==
Below are the individuals appointed by Elizabeth II in her right as Queen of the Commonwealth of The Bahamas, on the advice of Her Majesty's Bahamas Ministers.

=== Order of St Michael and St George ===
==== Companion of St Michael and St George (CMG) ====
- Bishop Dr. Delton Dewitt Fernander. For services to Religion.
- Churchill Tener Knowles. For services to Sport and to the Community.
- Leo Marvin Blaine Pinder. For services to Politics and to Business.

=== Order of the British Empire ===
==== Officer of the Order of the British Empire (OBE) ====
- Pastor Francis Moon Carey. For services to the Community.
- Steven Trevor Wright. For services to Business and to the Community.

==== Member of the Order of the British Empire (MBE) ====
- The Reverend Samuel Maxwell Boodle. For services to Religion.
- Bishop Walter Stafford Hanchell. For services to Religion and to the Community.
- Norward Rudolph Rahming. For services to Business and to Religion.
- Ann Elizabeth Percentie Russell. For services to Politics.

=== British Empire Medal (BEM) ===
- The Reverend Hencil Kenneth Bassinio Adderley. For services to Religion.
- Patricia Eva Pennerman-Bell. For services to Education and to the Community.
- Juletta Joan Lloyd-Charlton. For services to Education.
- Carriemae Agatha Hunt. For services to Politics.
- The Reverend Basil Johnson. For services to Religion.
- Bishop Lawrence Rolle. For services to Religion and to the Community.
- Kyron Elizabeth Strachan. For services to Business and to the Community.
- Paula Patricia Sweeting. For services to Education.

=== Queen's Police Medal (QPM) ===
- Clayton Leroy Fernander, Deputy Commissioner, The Royal Bahamas Police Force.

== Grenada ==
Below are the individuals appointed by Elizabeth II in her right as Queen of Grenada, on the advice of Her Majesty's Grenada Ministers.

=== Order of the British Empire ===
==== Officer of the Order of the British Empire (OBE) ====
- Richard Duncan. For services to the Banking Sector.

==== Member of the Order of the British Empire (MBE) ====
- Dr. Valma Jessamy. For services to the Environment, to Manufacturing and to Eco-Tourism.
- Anderson Peters. For services to Sport.

=== British Empire Medal (BEM) ===
- Allyson Clouden. For services to Nursing.
- Desmond Gill. For services to Fishing.
- John Wells. For services to Farming.

== Saint Lucia ==
Below are the individuals appointed by Elizabeth II in her right as Queen of Saint Lucia, on the advice of Her Majesty's Saint Lucia Ministers.

=== Order of the British Empire ===
==== Commander of the Order of the British Empire (CBE) ====
- Francis Percival MacDonald. For his contribution to Community Services, Development and Outreach Programmes towards alleviating Poverty.

==== Officer of the Order of the British Empire (OBE) ====
- Anthony Theodore Gobat. For services to Business and to Tourism.

==== Member of the Order of the British Empire (MBE) ====
- Peterson Jn. Charles. For services to the Community.
- Dr Hilda Rosemarie Husbands Mathurin. For National, Public and Community Service.
- Sister Marie Bridget St Croix. For services to the Community.
- Jacqueline Louise Vite. For her contribution to Community Services, Development and Outreach Programmes towards alleviating Poverty.

=== British Empire Medal (BEM) ===
- Marie Zita Celise. For services to the Community.
- Louis De Leon. For his contribution to Community Infrastructural Services and Development.
- John Ince. For services to the Community

== Antigua and Barbuda ==
Below are the individuals appointed by Elizabeth II in her right as Queen of Antigua and Barbuda, on the advice of Her Majesty's Antigua and Barbuda Ministers.

=== Order of the British Empire ===
==== Officer of the Order of the British Empire (OBE) ====
- Lorraine Cecilia Perry MBE. For public service to Antigua and Barbuda.

==== Member of the Order of the British Empire (MBE) ====
- Debra Gaye Hechme. For services to Business and Community Development.

=== Queen's Police Medal (QPM) ===
- Cosmos Layne Marcelle, lately Superintendent, the Royal Police Force of Antigua and Barbuda.

== See also ==
- Australian honours system
- New Zealand royal honours system
- Orders, decorations, and medals of the United Kingdom
- 2022 Canadian honours
