= Reshma Sharma =

Solicitor General of the Cayman Islands

Reshma Sharma is a Trinidad and Tobago lawyer and judge. She is currently serving as the Solicitor General of the Cayman Islands, a position that she has held since 1 August 2019.

== Early life ==
Sharma has a bachelor of laws degree from the University of the West Indies, a masters of law degree in commercial law from the University of Aberdeen, and a Legal Education Certificate from the Hugh Wooding Law School. She was called to the bar in Trinidad and Tobago in October 1997.

== Legal career ==
Sharma began working as an attorney in the High Court of Trinidad and Tobago, before being appointed as State Counsel and later acting Senior State Counsel for the Solicitor General's Chambers in the office of the Attorney General of Trinidad and Tobago. She was responsible for acting for the State regarding public, administrative and constitutional law cases being heard in the High Court and Court of Appeal of Trinidad and Tobago. She moved to the Cayman Islands, where she was appointed Crown Counsel in May 2005, and promoted to Senior Crown Counsel in June 2007, with responsibility for Treaties and Conventions. In this role, she was in charge of coordinating treaties involving the Cayman Islands, including the International Covenant on Civil and Political Rights and the Convention on the Elimination of All Forms of Discrimination against Women. She also was counsel for the Central Authority under the mutual legal assistance treaty between the United States and the United Kingdom, where she was responsible for receiving and reviewing letters of request under the Hague Convention on the Taking of Evidence Abroad in Civil or Commercial Matters.

Sharma became Deputy Solicitor General in June 2016 and served as the acting Solicitor General from 1 June 2017 until 31 July 2019. She has also worked as the acting Attorney General at various times. She is the chief officer in the Portfolio of Legal Affairs. She was previously a member of the Cayman Islands Water Authority, as well as serving on the Anti-Money Laundering Steering Group, the Law Reform Commission and the Cayman Islands Child Safeguarding Board. She became the Deputy Solicitor General in 2017, after which she served on occasion as the acting Attorney General and acting Solicitor General of the territory.

Sharma was appointed as the Solicitor General of the Cayman Islands with effect from 1 August 2019. She was involved in several notable cases, including the first constitutional challenge under the Cayman Islands Constitution Order, 2009 involving the right to same-sex marriage and age/nationality discrimination, the first judicial review involving the UK Colonial Prisoners Removal Act, 1984, a challenge under the UK Extradition Act (Overseas Territories) Order, and applications under the Elections Act for declarations of eligibility to run for office.

Sharma was appointed as a Queen's Counsel on 5 August 2021, by Governor Martyn Roper after being recommended by the Chief Justice Anthony Smellie. She was admitted to the Inner Bar of the Grand Court of the Cayman Islands at a ceremony on 3 September 2021. She was nominated by Tom Lowe QC, who noted that she was "destined for silk" as the name Reshma means silk in Hindi.
