= Burnand (surname) =

Burnand is a surname. Notable people include:

- Aisling Burnand (born 1964), British businesswoman
- Alphonse Burnand (1896–1981), American sailor
- Eugène Burnand (1850–1921), Swiss painter and illustrator
- F. C. Burnand (1836–1917), English comic writer and playwright
- Geoffrey Burnand (1912–1997), English painter, theatrical designer and mural artist
- Harry Burnand (1850–1919), English-born New Zealand engineer and sawmiller
- Hugo Burnand, British photographer
