= Peter Harwood =

Guernsey lawyer and politician

Peter Harwood OBE

Chief Minister of Guernsey
- In office 1 May 2012 – 12 March 2014
- Monarch: Elizabeth II
- Preceded by: Lyndon Trott
- Succeeded by: Jonathan Le Tocq

Personal details
- Born: 1947 (age 77–78); Guernsey
- Political party: Independent

Peter Andrew Harwood OBE (born 1947) is a Guernsey lawyer and politician who was the Chief Minister of Guernsey from 1 May 2012 until 25 February 2014.

Harwood was born in Guernsey and educated at Elizabeth College, Guernsey and University of Southampton. He was admitted as an English Solicitor in 1972 and continued in employment in London as a Solicitor and latterly as a Corporate Finance Executive before returning to Guernsey. Called to the Guernsey Bar as an Advocate in 1982, Deputy Harwood served as a partner of law firm Ozannes until the end of 2009 and as a consultant until retirement in December 2011.

Harwood was appointed a commissioner of the Guernsey Financial Services Commission in 2004 and served as chairman from 2006 until retirement in January 2012. He was chairman of the panel to review Guernsey's Machinery of Government from 1998 to 2000. He is also a founder trustee of the Help a Guernsey Child charity.

Harwood was elected to the States of Deliberation in April 2012 and elected Chief Minister of Guernsey in May 2012. According to BBC News, he won a vote of 27-20 against the only other candidate Deputy Jonathan Le Tocq. He resigned as Chief Minister on 25 February 2014.

Harwood was appointed Officer of the Order of the British Empire (OBE) in the 2022 Birthday Honours for services to Guernsey.

Political offices
Preceded by Lyndon Trott	Chief Minister of Guernsey; 2012–2014	Succeeded by Jonathan Le Tocq
