= Kath Maitland =

Professor of Paediatric Tropical Diseases

Kathryn Maitland OBE FRCPCH FMedSci
- Education: St Bartholomew's Medical School; University of London
- Scientific career
- Workplaces: Imperial College, London; KEMRI-Wellcome Trust Research Programme, Kenya

Kathryn Maitland is a British paediatrician who is professor of infectious diseases at Imperial College London, director of the ICCARE Centre at the Institute of Global Health Innovation and an Honorary Fellow at Medical Research Council Clinical Trials Unit, University College, London. Since 2000 she has been based at the KEMRI-Wellcome Trust Research Programme, in Kilifi, Kenya.

== Early life and education ==
Maitland attended school in Appleton, Cheshire. Maitland completed her undergraduate degree in medicine at the St Bartholomew's Medical School in 1986. She specialises in paediatrics, global health and clinical trials.

== Research and career ==
Maitland worked as a clinician scientist co-managing a project of field-based longitudinal epidemiology studies on the Pacific islands of Vanuatu, working with Professor Sir David Weatherall. The work investigated malaria parasite species interactions and host protection by alpha thalassaemia. Since 2000, Maitland has been based full-time in East Africa, leading a research group studying the impact of effective emergency care on childhood mortality.

Maitland was the principal investigator on the FEAST trial. The trial demonstrated that fluid boluses resulted in increased mortality in African children with severe febrile illness and excess mortality was largely a result of cardio-vascular collapse. The paper reporting the FEAST trial won the 2012 BMJ Research Paper of the Year. Her group completed the multicentre TRACT trial which tested two transfusion and treatment strategies in nearly 4000 children in Africa that aimed to reduce deaths and illness those hospitalised with severe anaemia, providing randomised evidence for transfusion management. Other aspects of her research portfolio include clinical studies and trials in severe malaria, severe malnutrition and oxygen and respiratory support trial in children hospitalised with severe pneumonia.

Maitland was elected to the Academy of Medical Sciences (United Kingdom) in 2016. She was appointed Officer of the Order of the British Empire (OBE) in the 2022 Birthday Honours for services to medical science.

== Selected publications ==
- Williams, T. N.; Maitland, K.; Bennett, S.; Ganczakowski, M.; Peto, T. E. A.; Newbold, C. I.; Bowden, D. K.; Weatherall, D. J.; Clegg, J. B. (October 1996). "High incidence of malaria in α-thalassaemic children". Nature. 383 (6600): 522–525. Bibcode:1996Natur.383..522W. doi:10.1038/383522a0. PMID 8849722. S2CID 4369124.
- Maitland, Kathryn; Berkley, James A; Shebbe, Mohammed; Peshu, Norbert; English, Michael; Newton, Charles R. J. C; Molyneux, Elizabeth (26 December 2006). "Children with Severe Malnutrition: Can Those at Highest Risk of Death Be Identified with the WHO Protocol?". PLOS Medicine. 3 (12) e500. doi:10.1371/journal.pmed.0030500. PMC 1716191. PMID 17194194.
- Maitland, Kathryn; Kiguli, Sarah; Opoka, Robert O.; Engoru, Charles; Olupot-Olupot, Peter; Akech, Samuel O.; Nyeko, Richard; Mtove, George; Reyburn, Hugh; Lang, Trudie; Brent, Bernadette; Evans, Jennifer A.; Tibenderana, James K.; Crawley, Jane; Russell, Elizabeth C.; Levin, Michael; Babiker, Abdel G.; Gibb, Diana M. (30 June 2011). "Mortality after Fluid Bolus in African Children with Severe Infection". New England Journal of Medicine. 364 (26): 2483–2495. doi:10.1056/NEJMoa1101549. hdl:10044/1/20023. PMID 21615299.
- Maitland, Kathryn (22 December 2016). "Severe Malaria in African Children — The Need for Continuing Investment". New England Journal of Medicine. 375 (25): 2416–2417. doi:10.1056/NEJMp1613528. PMC 6858851. PMID 28002698.
- Maitland, Kathryn; Kiguli, Sarah; Opoka, Robert O.; Olupot-Olupot, Peter; Engoru, Charles; Njuguna, Patricia; Bandika, Victor; Mpoya, Ayub; Bush, Andrew; Williams, Thomas N.; Grieve, Richard; Sadique, Zia; Fraser, John; Harrison, David; Rowan, Kathy (9 January 2018). "Children's Oxygen Administration Strategies Trial (COAST): A randomised controlled trial of high flow versus oxygen versus control in African children with severe pneumonia". Wellcome Open Research. 2: 100. doi:10.12688/wellcomeopenres.12747.2. PMC 5771148. PMID 29383331.
- Maitland, Kathryn; Kiguli, Sarah; Olupot-Olupot, Peter; Engoru, Charles; Mallewa, Macpherson; Saramago Goncalves, Pedro; Opoka, Robert O.; Mpoya, Ayub; Alaroker, Florence; Nteziyaremye, Julius; Chagaluka, George; Kennedy, Neil; Nabawanuka, Eva; Nakuya, Margaret; Namayanja, Cate; Uyoga, Sophie; Kyeyune Byabazaire, Dorothy; M'baya, Bridon; Wabwire, Benjamin; Frost, Gary; Bates, Imelda; Evans, Jennifer A.; Williams, Thomas N.; George, Elizabeth C.; Gibb, Diana M.; Walker, A. Sarah (1 August 2019). "Immediate Transfusion in African Children with Uncomplicated Severe Anemia". New England Journal of Medicine. 381 (5): 407–419. doi:10.1056/NEJMoa1900105. PMC 7611152. PMID 31365799.
- Maitland, Kathryn; Olupot-Olupot, Peter; Kiguli, Sarah; Chagaluka, George; Alaroker, Florence; Opoka, Robert O.; Mpoya, Ayub; Engoru, Charles; Nteziyaremye, Julius; Mallewa, Macpherson; Kennedy, Neil; Nakuya, Margaret; Namayanja, Cate; Kayaga, Julianna; Uyoga, Sophie; Kyeyune Byabazaire, Dorothy; M'baya, Bridon; Wabwire, Benjamin; Frost, Gary; Bates, Imelda; Evans, Jennifer A.; Williams, Thomas N.; Saramago Goncalves, Pedro; George, Elizabeth C.; Gibb, Diana M.; Walker, A. Sarah (1 August 2019). "Transfusion Volume for Children with Severe Anemia in Africa". New England Journal of Medicine. 381 (5): 420–431. doi:10.1056/NEJMoa1900100. PMC 7610610. PMID 31365800.
- Maitland, Kathryn; Olupot-Olupot, Peter; Kiguli, Sarah; Chagaluka, George; Alaroker, Florence; Opoka, Robert O; Mpoya, Ayub; Walsh, Kevin; Engoru, Charles; Nteziyaremye, Julius; Mallewa, Machpherson; Kennedy, Neil; Nakuya, Margaret; Namayanja, Cate; Kayaga, Julianne; Nabawanuka, Eva; Sennyondo, Tonny; Aromut, Denis; Kumwenda, Felistas; Musika, Cynthia Williams; Thomason, Margaret J; Bates, Imelda; von Hensbroek, Michael Boele; Evans, Jennifer A; Uyoga, Sophie; Williams, Thomas N; Frost, Gary; George, Elizabeth C; Gibb, Diana M; Walker, A Sarah (October 2019). "Co-trimoxazole or multivitamin multimineral supplement for post-discharge outcomes after severe anaemia in African children: a randomised controlled trial". The Lancet Global Health. 7 (10): e1435–e1447. doi:10.1016/S2214-109X(19)30345-6. PMC 7024999. PMID 31537373.
- Hakim, James; Musiime, Victor; Szubert, Alex J.; Mallewa, Jane; Siika, Abraham; Agutu, Clara; Walker, Simon; Pett, Sarah L.; Bwakura-Dangarembizi, Mutsa; Lugemwa, Abbas; Kaunda, Symon; Karoney, Mercy; Musoro, Godfrey; Kabahenda, Sheila; Nathoo, Kusum; Maitland, Kathryn; Griffiths, Anna; Thomason, Margaret J.; Kityo, Cissy; Mugyenyi, Peter; Prendergast, Andrew J.; Walker, A. Sarah; Gibb, Diana M. (20 July 2017). "Enhanced Prophylaxis plus Antiretroviral Therapy for Advanced HIV Infection in Africa". New England Journal of Medicine. 377 (3): 233–245. doi:10.1056/NEJMoa1615822. PMC 5603269. PMID 28723333.
