= Baron Renfrew =

Baron Renfrew or Baron of Renfrew may refer to:

- Baron of Renfrew (ship), a wooden ship
- Baron of Renfrew (title), a subsidiary title of the Scottish and British heir apparent
- Colin Renfrew, Baron Renfrew of Kaimsthorn (1937–2024), British archaeologist

== See also ==
- Renfrew (disambiguation)
