= Parveen Yaqoob =

British professor (born 1968)

Professor Parveen Yaqoob OBE MA DPhil RNutr FAfN FHEA
- Yaqoob in 2024
- Born: 1 October 1968 (age 57); Croydon, England
- Education: Selhurst High School for Girls; The Old Palace School
- Alma mater: St Hilda's College, Oxford; Wolfson College, Oxford
- Board member of: Royal Berkshire NHS Foundation Trust; Advance HE

Parveen Yaqoob is a professor of Nutritional Physiology at the University of Reading. She is currently the Pro-Vice-Chancellor for Research & Innovation and is serving as Deputy Vice-Chancellor. She has made significant contributions to the science of diet, health, ageing and immune function/inflammation, as well as to higher education in the UK. She also acts as non-executive director for the Royal Berkshire NHS Foundation Trust.

== Education and career ==
Yaqoob is of Pakistani descent. She graduated with a BA in Physiological Sciences and subsequently a DPhil in Biochemistry from the University of Oxford.

Following post-doctoral positions at both University of Oxford and University of Southampton, she was appointed to a Lectureship in Human Nutrition at the University of Reading in 1998 and awarded the title of Professor of Nutritional Physiology in 2010. She was appointed head of the School of Chemistry, Food & Pharmacy in 2015 and Pro-Vice-Chancellor Research and Innovation in 2018, taking on the additional role of Deputy Vice-Chancellor in 2020.

Yaqoob was chair of the Athena SWAN Governance Committee, from 2020 to 2023, responsible for overseeing the transformation of the Athena Swan Charter following an independent review in 2020 and raising the profile of gender equality in higher education. She was appointed to the board of directors of Advance HE and chair of its Equality, Diversity and Inclusion Committee in 2023.

== Research interests ==
Yaqoob's research investigates the influence of nutrition on immunity, inflammation and vascular function, particularly with respect to cardiovascular disease. Yaqoob played a key role in the development of an MSc (launched 2000) and a BSc (launched 2005) in Nutrition and Food Science at the University of Reading.

== Awards and honours ==
- Awarded Order of British Empire (OBE) for services to higher education in the 2022 Queens' Birthday Honours List
- The Nutrition Society Silver Medal (2003)
- Fellow of the Association for Nutrition (FAfN)
- Fellow of the Higher Education Academy (FHEA)
- Member of the Steering Group of the BBSRC Diet and Health Research Industry Club
