= Renfrow =

Renfrow may refer to:

- Renfrow, Oklahoma, U.S. town
- Renfrow (surname)

== See also ==
- Renfro (disambiguation)
