= Suleman Raza =

British-Pakistani restaurateur and activist

Suleman Raza MBE
- Born: August 1980 (age 45–46); Rawalpindi, Pakistan
- Occupations: Restaurateur, chef and activist
- Known for: Founder of One Million Meals; Owner of Spice Village
- Style: Pakistani cuisine
- Honours: Member of the Order of the British Empire; Points of Light

Suleman Raza MBE (born August 1980) is a British Pakistani restaurateur and activist. He is the founder of One Million Meals, a charitable campaign started in March 2020 from his own restaurant chain using GoFundMe in the UK. He owned the cricket franchise Mirpur Royals in the Kashmir Premier League. The prime minister of the United Kingdom, Boris Johnson, awarded Raza the Points of Light award in 2021 for the One Million Meals campaign. The House of Lords awarded Raza with the Local Community Hero for his humanitarian services in London. He has also been working as the co-chairperson of the UK Pakistan Business Council (UKPBC) to discuss the Pakistani business community concerns with the British prime minister Boris Johnson.

== Personal life ==
Raza was born in Rawalpindi, Pakistan. He moved to London with his family during the year 2000. Since 2004, Raza has been living in London, running his family business in the restaurant industry. He is married and has five children.

== Career ==
In 2000, Nasir and his brother Raza began their career as a chef in a restaurant in Brixton, London. Four years later, they started a restaurant called Spice Village in Tooting, south London. By 2021, Raza owned multiple branches of his restaurants and served Pakistani cuisine in south and west London. He also entered into the event business and owned a banquet, Grand Sapphire Hotels.

In March 2021, Raza initiated a drive-through in-car dining trend to revive the restaurant and venue business.

In August 2021, he entered into Pakistani sports as an owner of the Mirpur Royals squad for the KPL. At the end of the series, Raza celebrated the success of the tournament with his team and congratulated the Kashmiris. Raza left Mirpur Royals after the first season.

== Philanthropy ==
Raza has been running the campaign "No One Eats Alone on Christmas Day" annually since 2015 to serve homeless people in Croydon, South London. On 23 November 2019, Raza signed an agreement with the Armed Forces Covenant with Rear Admiral Mike Bath from the Royal Navy to support the British armed forces community through his restaurant business. On 1 April 2020, the One Million Meals campaign was launched to serve National Health Service key workers and other vulnerable people in London. By May 2021, the One Million Meals managed to serve more than 200 locations and 47 hospitals across UK.

== Honours and awards ==
In 2021, he received the Points of Light award by British Prime Minister Boris Johnson and the GG2 Spirit in the Community Award by the Royal Navy for running 'One Million Meals' campaign through his restaurant. On 7 September 2021, he was recognized as the Local Community Hero by the House of Lords for his charity work in London. By coincidence, Raza was appointed a Member of the Order of the British Empire (MBE) for services to business and philanthropy at the same time that his voluntary organisation, Spice Village Uplyft, was awarded the Queen's Award for Voluntary Service (which is equivalent to an MBE) in the 2022 Birthday Honours.

== See also ==
- The British Curry Awards
- Mirpur Royals
- Member of the Order of the British Empire
- Points of Light
