= Renfro =

Renfro may refer to:

- Renfro (surname)
- Renfro, Missouri, a community in the United States
- Renfro Foods, an American salsa, sauce, and relish producer
- Renfro Hotel, Park City, Kentucky, US
- Renfro Brands, an American sock and legwear company, a subsidiary of Renco Group
- Renfro Valley, Kentucky, US

== See also ==
- Renfrow (disambiguation)
