= Rachel Batterham =

British physician and academic

Rachel L. Batterham
- Education: Imperial College London
- Scientific career
- Workplaces: University College London Hospitals NHS Foundation Trust; University College London
- Thesis: The role of peptide YY in the regulation of food intake (2004)

Rachel Louise Batterham OBE is a British physician who is a professor of Obesity, Diabetes and Endocrinology at University College London. She established the University College London Hospitals NHS Foundation Trust Bariatric Centre for Weight Management and Metabolic Surgery. She has extensively studied obesity, and has contributed to clinical management and the understanding of obesity-related diseases.

== Early life and education ==
Batterham was an undergraduate medical student at Imperial College London, where she was based at St Mary's Hospital. She completed her speciality training in diabetes and endocrinology. As part of her training, she became particularly interested in obesity. After her residency, she worked toward a master's degree in biochemistry. She eventually completed a doctorate in the regulation of body weight.

== Research and career ==
In 2005, Batterham was appointed a consultant at the University College London Hospitals NHS Foundation Trust, where she set up a service for the management of obesity. She was eventually promoted to Professor of Obesity, Diabetes and Endocrinology, and appointed Obesity theme lead for the UCL National Institute for Health and Care Research Biomedical Research Centre.

Batterham identified that a genetic variation in the FTO gene can make people more likely to become obese. People with the obesity-risk variant have higher circulating levels of ghrelin in their blood, which means that they feel hungry even after having a meal.

In 2016, Batterham was awarded a Research Professorship by the National Institute for Health and Care Research (NIHR). She looked to improve the health of people with obesity. Whilst bariatric surgery can cause long-term weight loss, it can be difficult to access and does not always improve human health. Batterham sought to understand whether genotypes could be used to determine whether or not someone respond well to bariatric surgery. She investigated whether exercise or pharmaceutical interventions could improve weight loss and health outcomes. Batterhman believes that health inequalities perpetuate obesity amongst people from lower socio-economic backgrounds.

Batterham founded the Obesity Empowerment Network in 2019. The charity looks to empower and engage people of all ages who have obesity. In 2022, she created a documentary on obesity and how the phenomenon can be addressed.

== Awards and honours ==
- 2015 Diabetes UK Rank Fund Nutrition Prize
- 2016 Appointed to the Council of the British Obesity and Metabolic Surgery Society
- 2016 Andre Mayer award from the World Obesity Federation
- 2018 Royal Society of Medicine's Steven's Lecture
- 2017 Sir Jules Thorn Award for Biomedical Award
- 2018 Crick Lecture
- 2022 Appointed Order of the British Empire in the Platinum Jubilee Civic Honours

== Selected publications ==
- Rachel L Batterham; Michael A Cowley; Caroline J Small; et al. (1 August 2002). "Gut hormone PYY(3-36) physiologically inhibits food intake". Nature. 418 (6898): 650–654. doi:10.1038/nature00887. ISSN 1476-4687. PMID 12167864. Wikidata Q34143493.
- A M Wren; C J Small; C R Abbott; et al. (1 November 2001). "Ghrelin causes hyperphagia and obesity in rats". Diabetes. 50 (11): 2540–2547. doi:10.2337/diabetes.50.11.2540. ISSN 0012-1797. PMID 11679432. Wikidata Q48731123.
- Carel le Roux; Simon J B Aylwin; Rachel L Batterham; et al. (1 January 2006). "Gut hormone profiles following bariatric surgery favor an anorectic state, facilitate weight loss, and improve metabolic parameters". Annals of Surgery. 243 (1): 108–114. doi:10.1097/01.sla.0000183349.16877.84. ISSN 0003-4932. PMC 1449984. PMID 16371744. Wikidata Q47356520.
