= Stewart Renfrew =

Scottish footballer

Personal information
- Place of birth: Scotland
- Position: Centre forward

Senior career*
Years	Team	Apps	(Gls)
–1931	Dunblane Rovers		
1931–1932	Sheffield Wednesday	0	(0)
1932	Dunblane Rovers		
1932–1934	Cowdenbeath	45	(27)
1934–1937	Queen of the South	11	(5)
1935–1936	→ Derry City (loan)		

International career
1931	Scotland Juniors	2	(0)
- * Club domestic league appearances and goals

Stewart M. Renfrew was a Scottish football centre forward who played in the Scottish League for Cowdenbeath and Queen of the South. He was capped by Scotland at junior level.

== Career statistics ==
Appearances and goals by club, season and competition
Club	Season	League			Scottish Cup		Total	
Club	Season	Division	Apps	Goals	Apps	Goals	Apps	Goals
Cowdenbeath	1932–33	Scottish First Division	15	12	0	0	15	12
Cowdenbeath	1933–34	Scottish First Division	30	15	3	0	33	15
Cowdenbeath	Total		45	17	3	0	48	17
Queen of the South	1934–35	Scottish First Division	11	5	1	0	12	5
Career total			56	22	4	0	60	22

== Honours ==
- Cowdenbeath Hall of Fame
