= Anthony Smellie =

Chief judge of the Cayman Islands

The Right Honourable Sir Anthony Stafford Smellie KCMG KC is the former Chief Justice of the Cayman Islands.

== Career ==
Smellie received his LLB from the University of the West Indies in 1975. He was called to the bar in Jamaica, where he served as Clerk of the Courts in Westmoreland from 1976 to 1977. He then worked as Crown Counsel and Assistant Director of Public Prosecution from 1977 to 1983. He was an assistant lecturer at the Norman Manley Law School in Jamaica from 1980 to 1983.

He moved to the Cayman Islands in 1983, where he served as Principal Crown Counsel and Solicitor General from 1983 to 1992. Justice Smellie was appointed a Queen's Counsel in 1991. He was acting Attorney General from January to November 1992. In January 1993, he was appointed judge of the Grand Court. He then became the Chief Justice in June 1998.

He is a founding member of the Caribbean Financial Action Task Force, representing the Cayman Islands, and he serves as the Mutual Legal Assistance Authority under the United States/Cayman Mutual Legal Assistance Treaty.

In 2018, he was appointed to Bermuda's Court of Appeal.

Smellie was appointed Knight Commander of the Order of Saint Michael and Saint George (KCMG) in the 2022 Birthday Honours for services to law and justice in the Cayman Islands and the Caribbean.

On 5 February 2025, it was announced he was appointed a Privy Counsellor, and can therefore sit on the Judicial Committee of the Privy Council and hear final appeals from various Caribbean jurisdictions.
