= Aisling Burnand =

British businesswoman (1964 - 2022)

- Born: 22 December 1964
- Died: 19 September 2022 (aged 57)
- Occupation: businesswoman

Aisling Maria Burnand CBE (born 22 December 1964; died 19 September 2022) was a British business executive and consultant. In 2009, she joined Cancer Research UK as Executive Director of Policy & Public Affairs. In 2014, she became chief executive of the Association of Medical Research Charities.

== Career ==
Burnand worked as head of international media relations for Rhône-Poulenc in Paris, then as a director at the Rowland Company, a London-based public affairs consultancy.

She joined the UK BioIndustry Association (BIA) UK BioIndustry Association (BIA) as its first director of Public Affairs in 1998, when the UK biotechnology industry was in its infancy. The association now represents more than three hundred UK biotech companies. In 2001, Burnand became Deputy Chief Executive, and from 2003 until December 2009, she was Chief Executive. She was succeeded by Nigel Gaymond.

At the BIA, Burnand lobbied on behalf of stem cell research, and supported the passage of the Serious Organised Crime and Police Act 2005, which gives greater protection for medical researchers from animal rights extremists and other threats. She also had to reassure the public about medicines based on monoclonal antibodies when six volunteers suffered severe adverse reactions during a clinical trial at Northwick Park Hospital in 2006.

She was appointed Member of the Order of the British Empire (MBE) in 2007 for services to science.

She joined Cancer Research UK in 2009. As Executive Director of Policy & Public Affairs, she has responsibility for the charity's policies on cancer, science and charity issues, seeking along with others to influence politicians and civil servants on issues of importance to cancer patients.

In 2020, Burnand warned during the COVID-19 pandemic that medical research could suffer for years due to the drop in revenue from donations and fund-raising.

Burnand was appointed Commander of the Order of the British Empire (CBE) in the 2022 Birthday Honours for services to the charitable sector.
