= Mary Renfrew =

Professor of midwifery

Mary Renfrew OBE FRSE
- Occupations: Midwife, Professor
- Employer: University of Dundee
- Awards: OBE for services to midwifery

Mary Josephine Renfrew OBE FRSE (born 1955) is a British midwife and academic.

== Education ==
Renfrew graduated in nursing from the University of Edinburgh in 1975, and in midwifery from the same institution in 1978. She obtained a PhD on breastfeeding in 1982, while at the Medical Research Council's reproductive biology unit in Edinburgh.

== Career ==
She was at the national perinatal epidemiology unit of the University of Oxford from 1988 to 1994, where she set up National Midwifery Research Initiative. Following that, she was professor of midwifery at the University of Leeds until 2003, then professor of mother and infant health at the University of York from 2003. As of 2017, she is professor of mother and Infant health and an associate dean of research, at Dundee University.

She has also worked in Canada.

She has written reviews of breastfeeding for the Cochrane Library, the World Health Organization's Reproductive Health Library, the Human Tissue Authority, the UK government's Department of Health, and the National Institute for Health and Care Excellence.

She has served as chair of the World Health Organization's maternal and newborn health strategic committee.

== Honours ==
In 2014 she was elected as a Fellow of the Royal Society of Edinburgh (FRSE) - the first midwife or nurse to receive that honour.

Renfrew was appointed Officer of the Order of the British Empire (OBE) in the 2022 Birthday Honours for services to midwifery. She was elected a Fellow of the Academy of Medical Sciences in 2022.
