= Renfro (surname) =

Renfro is a surname of Scottish origin, and a variant of Renfrew. Notable people with the surname include:

- Alfred T. Renfro (1877–1964), American artist
- Brad Renfro (1982–2008), American actor
- Elza T. Renfro (1902–1935), American football, basketball, and baseball player and coach
- Julia Renfro, Aruban journalist
- Leonard Renfro (born 1970), American football player
- Marli Renfro (born 1938), American model and actress
- Mel Renfro (born 1941), American football player
- Mike Renfro (born 1955), American football player
- Ray Renfro (1929–1997), American football player
- Raye Renfro (1940–1978), American football player and athlete
- Will Renfro (1932–2010), American football player

== See also ==
- Renfroe, surname
- Renfrow (surname)
