= Renfrow (surname) =

Renfrow is a surname of Scottish origin, and a variant of Renfrew. Notable people with the surname include:

- Hunter Renfrow (born 1995), American football player
- Justin Renfrow (born 1989), American football player
- MaeMae Renfrow (born 1997), American actress and model
- Randy Renfrow (born 1958), American racecar driver
- William Cary Renfrow (1845–1922), American soldier

== See also ==
- Renfro (surname)
- Renfroe, surname
