= Colonial =

Colonial or The Colonial may refer to:

- Colonial, of, relating to, or characteristic of a colony or colony (biology)

== Architecture ==
- American colonial architecture
- French colonial architecture
- Spanish colonial architecture

== Automobiles ==
- Colonial (1920 automobile), the first American automobile with four-wheel brakes
- Colonial (Shaw automobile), a rebranded Shaw sold from 1921 until 1922
- Colonial (1921 automobile), a car from Boston which was sold from 1921 until 1922

== Commerce ==
- Colonial Pipeline, the largest oil pipeline network in the U.S.
- Inmobiliaria Colonial, a Spanish corporation, which includes companies in the domains of real estate

== Places ==
- The Colonial (Indianapolis, Indiana)
- The Colonial (Mansfield, Ohio), a National Register of Historic Places listing in Richland County, Ohio
- Ciudad Colonial (Santo Domingo), a historic central neighborhood of Santo Domingo
- Colonial Country Club (Memphis), a golf course in Tennessee
- Colonial Country Club (Fort Worth), a golf course in Texas
  - Fort Worth Invitational or The Colonial, a PGA golf tournament

== Trains ==
- Colonial (PRR train), a Pennsylvania Railroad run between Washington, DC and New York City, last operated in 1973 by Amtrak
- Colonial (Amtrak train), an Amtrak train that ran between Newport News, Virginia and Boston from 1976 to 1992, and between Richmond, Virginia and New York City from 1997 to 1999

== See also ==
- Colonial history of the United States, the period of American history from the 17th century to 1776, under the rule of Great Britain, France and Spain
- Colonial Hotel (disambiguation)
- Colonial Revival architecture
- Colonial Theatre (disambiguation)
- Colonial troops, any of various military units recruited from, or used as garrison troops in, colonial territories
- Colonialism, the extension of political control to new areas
- Colonials (disambiguation)
- Colonist, a person who has migrated to an area and established a permanent residence there to colonize the area
- History of Australia
- Spanish colonization of the Americas, the period of history of Spanish rule over most of the Americas, from the 15th century through the late 19th century
