= Colonials =

Colonials may refer to:

- Colonisers, implementers of colonization or colonialism
- Citizens of the colonies of British America

== Sports ==
=== Amateur and college ===
- Colonials (synchronized skating team), from West Acton, Massachusetts
- George Washington Colonials, the former nickname of George Washington University athletic teams, now known as "Revolutionaries"
- Luray Colonials, the former name of a collegiate summer baseball team now known as the Purcellville Cannons
- Robert Morris Colonials, the athletic teams of Robert Morris University

=== Professional ===
- Hartford Colonials, a UFL American football team 2009–2010
- Morris County Colonials, a National Premier Soccer League team
- Kingston Colonials, an American Basketball League team 1935–1940
- Kingston Colonials (baseball), an American minor-league team 1885–1951
- Morris County Colonials, the former name of the National Premier Soccer League team now known as Jersey Blues FC
- Pittsfield Colonials, a Can-Am League baseball team 1997-2011

== See also ==
- Colonial (disambiguation), including uses of The Colonial
