= Ambassador (automobile company) =

American automobile company

The Ambassador automobile company of Chicago, Illinois was founded in 1921 by John Hertz.

== History ==
In the late 1910s Hertz took control of the Walden W. Shaw Livery Corporation. The company had already been producing a car of their own, called the Weidely. He took the rest of the stock bodies and put 6-cylinder Continental engines in them, then sold them. The cars had full-leather trunks. In February 1921, the cars made their debut at the Drake Hotel in Chicago, Illinois during the Chicago Automobile Show. A 4-cylinder car costing $700 was announced in October of that year, but it was never made. After the original Weidely stock was used up, a smaller car was designed. After 1925, Hertz named it after himself.

=== Models ===
Model	Engine	HP	Wheelbase
Model R(1921–1923)	Inline 6-cylinder	75	136"
Model D-1(1924–1925)	Inline 6-cylinder	25	114"
