= Neuchâtel Trophy =

Synchronized skating competition

Neuchâtel Trophy is an international, multi-level synchronized skating competition, held in Neuchâtel, Switzerland. Held for the first time in 1999, the competition is organized by Swiss Ice Skating and sanctioned by the International Skating Union.

== Medalists ==
=== Senior teams ===
Year	Gold	Total	SP	FS	Silver	Total	SP	FS	Bronze	Total	SP	FS	Source(s)
1999	(Canada) L'Élite Rive Sud	1.5			(Canada) Les Étincelles	3.0			(Switzerland) Cool Dreams	5.0			
2000	(Germany) Team Berlin 1	1.5			(United States) Team Elan	3.0			(Canada) Les Étincelles	4.5			
2001	(Germany) Team Berlin 1				(Canada) Gold Ice				(Switzerland) Cool Dreams				
2002	(Sweden) Team Surprise	1.5	0.5	1.0	(Germany) Team Berlin 1	3.0	1.0	2.0	(Switzerland) Cool Dreams	4.5	1.5	3.0	
2003	(Sweden) Team Surprise	1.5	0.5	1.0	(Germany) Team Berlin 1	3.0	1.0	2.0	(United States) Miami University	4.5	1.5	3.0	
2004	(Sweden) Team Surprise	247.44	87.84	159.60	(United States) Haydenettes	217.51	74.57	142.94	(Finland) Rockettes	216.36	72.14	144.22	
2005	(no competition held)												
2006	(no competition held)												
2007	(Russia) Paradise	201.72	71.20	130.52	(Sweden) Team Boomerang	145.44	51.92	93.52	(Switzerland) Starlight Team	144.36	72.14	91.30	
2008	(Sweden) Team Surprise	196.24	71.36	124.88	(Sweden) Team Boomerang	155.83	54.80	101.03	(Switzerland) Starlight Team	147.04	52.76	94.28	
2009	(no competition held)												
2010	(Sweden) Team Surprise	194.22	71.58	122.64	(United States) Miami University	177.18	63.66	113.52	(Sweden) Team Boomerang	172.12	57.92	114.20	
2011	(no competition held)												
2012	(United States) Crystallettes	156.94	58.86	98.08	(United States) Haydenettes	151.76	49.68	102.08	(Germany) United Angels	114.32	39.30	75.02	
2013	(France) Ex'L Ice	103.52	33.16	70.36	(Switzerland) Starlight Team	88.77	27.84	60.93	(no other competitors)				
2014	(Russia) Paradise	210.48	71.27	139.21	(Sweden) Team Surprise	194.77	67.73	127.04	(Germany) Team Berlin 1	158.59	51.71	106.88	
2015	(no competition held)												
2016	(Russia) Paradise	213.50	73.53	139.97	(Canada) Les Suprêmes	198.06	66.88	131.18	(Finland) Team Unique	198.04	69.33	128.71	

=== Junior teams ===
Year	Gold	Total	SP	FS	Silver	Total	SP	FS	Bronze	Total	SP	FS	Source(s)
1999	(Canada) Ice Infinity	1.5	1	1	(United States) Colonials	3.5	3	2	(Sweden) Seaside	5.0	4	3	
2000	(Sweden) Seaside	1.5	1	1	(Finland) Reflections	3.0	2	2	(United States) Chicago Jazz	4.5	3	3	
2001	(no competition held for juniors)												
2002	(United States) Colonials	2.0	1.0	1.0	(Switzerland) Dolder Dancers	2.5	0.5	2	(Switzerland) Gipsies	4.5	1.5	3	
2003	(Switzerland) Hot Dreams	1.5	1	1	(Switzerland) Starlight	3.0	2	2	(United Kingdom) Ice Illusion	4.5	3	3	
2004	(Sweden) Team Convivium	163.79	59.71	104.08	(United States) Hockettes	159.35	58.79	100.56	(Germany) Silver Shadows	144.05	53.61	90.44	
2005	(no competition held)												
2006	(no competition held)												
2007	(Sweden) Team Convivium	144.60	53.82	90.78	(Germany) Team Berlin Juniors	125.04	49.44	75.60	(Finland) GoldenBlades	124.90	46.82	78.08	
2008	(Sweden) Team Convivium	163.33	62.44	100.89	(Germany) Skating Graces	107.56	37.85	69.71	(Switzerland) Starlight Juniors	103.62	38.48	65.14	
2009	(no competition held)												
2010	(Sweden) Team Convivium	163.48	60.12	103.36	(United States) Miami University	156.52	59.34	97.18	(Canada) Gold Ice	154.88	58.84	96.04	
2011	(no competition held)												
2012	(United States) Chicago Jazz	125.46	40.24	85.22	(United States) Lexettes	120.44	41.92	78.52	(Finland) Valley Bay Synchro	107.30	37.76	69.54	
2013	(Finland) Chrystal Dreams	105.92	37.29	68.63	(France) Black Diam's	98.55	34.76	63.79	(Switzerland) Cool Dreams	90.66	28.46	62.20	
2014	(no competition held for juniors)												
2015	(no competition held)												
2016	(United States) Chicago Jazz	148.07	54.40	93.67	(Canada) NEXXICE	138.86	46.33	92.53	(United States) Fond du Lac Blades	136.24	50.48	85.76	
