= Monroe (automobile) =

Defunct American motor vehicle manufacturer

Monroe Motor Company Monroe Motor Car Company William Small Company
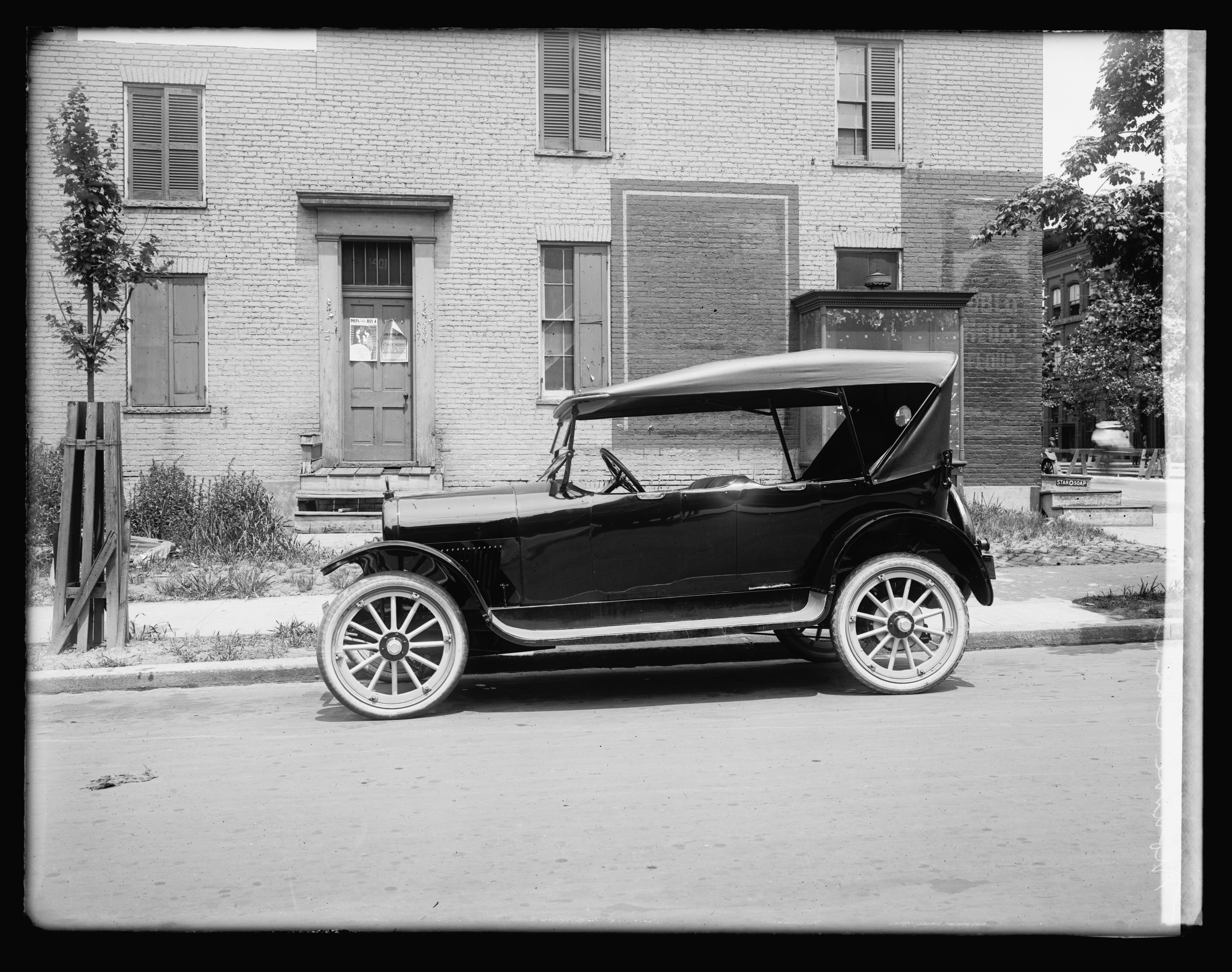
- 1920 Monroe Model S Touring Car
- Type: Automobile manufacturer
- Industry: Automotive
- Founded: 1914; 112 years ago
- Founder: R. H. Moore
- Defunct: 1923; 103 years ago
- Fate: Bankrupt
- Successor: Premier Motor Manufacturing Company
- Headquarters: Flint, Michigan, Pontiac, Michigan, Indianapolis, Indiana, United States
- Key people: R.F. Moore, Billy Durant, William Small, Louis Chevrolet
- Products: Automobiles
- Production output: 14,344 (1915-1923)

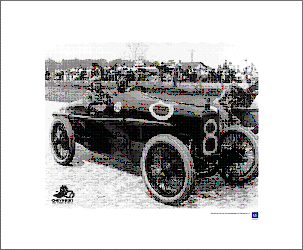
Gaston Chevrolet posing in a Monroe after a victory (1921)

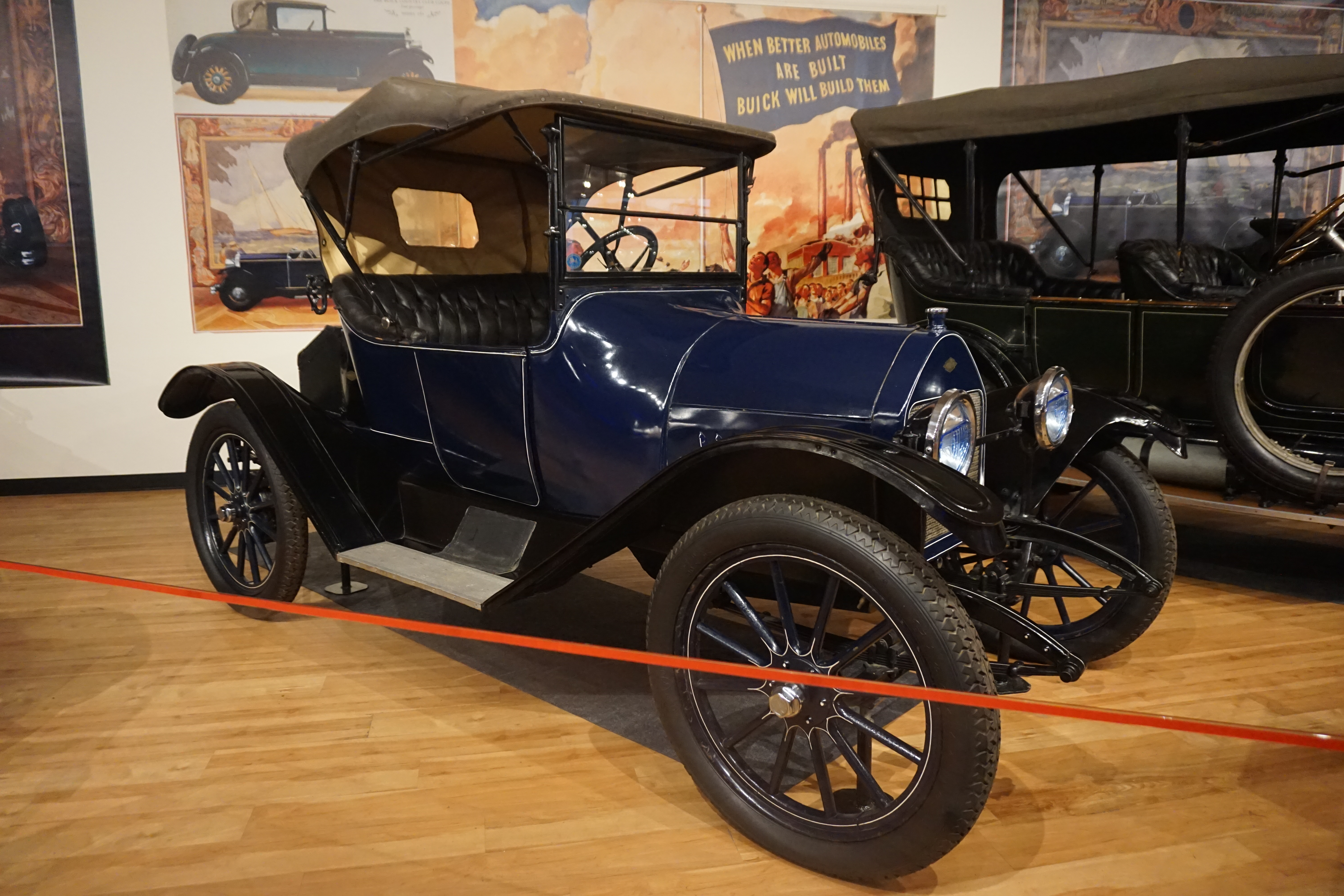
1914 Monroe Model 165 at the Sloan Museum

The Monroe was a Brass Era and vintage car built in Flint, Michigan (1914–1916), Pontiac, Michigan (1916–1918), and Indianapolis, Indiana (1918–1923).

== History ==
In the mid-teens, R. F. Monroe was head of the Monroe Body Company in Pontiac, while William C. Durant headed Chevrolet in Flint. These two worked together to form Monroe Motor Company in Flint in August 1914. Monroe was president, while Durant was vice-president. There was a cross-stockholding arrangement between the Monroe and Chevrolet companies. Construction of the Monroe cars occurred in a plant formerly used by Chevrolet in Flint, and the Chevrolet company undertook to distribute the new Monroe automobile. In April 1916, Durant resigned his vice-presidency, and the Monroe company moved into the former Welch factory in Pontiac.

The company was now reorganized as the Monroe Motor Car Company, with a capitalization increase to $1,000,000. This company went bankrupt in 1918. In the fall of the same year, the William Small Company of Indianapolis bought the assets of the Monroe company. The Small company had previously distributed Monroe in Indianapolis. The Pontiac factory was now leased to the United States Motor Company for production of the Sampson truck. Monroe production was then carried out in Indianapolis only. The showroom was located at 602 N. Capitol Street in Indianapolis and the building still stands today.

The Monroe had started as a light, small car, with only open cars on offer. By 1918 they came equipped with an engine of the company's own design, and a sedan was included in the price lists by 1918. At this time, Louis Chevrolet was brought in by William Small as a consulting engineer to "work out design problems for the Monroe car." Chevrolet had little impact on the production Monroe car, but he did assemble seven race cars with Cornelius Van Ranst. Three of these were raced as Frontenacs, while the other four used the Monroe name. Louis Chevrolet's brother, Gaston, won the 1920 Indianapolis 500 in a Monroe. This was the first time an American car won at the Speedway since 1912. The Monroe team was the first to use radio communication to the driver in 1922. A car driven by Wilbur D'Alene with mechanic Worth Schloeman was fitted with the radio equipment.

Later the same summer, the William Small Company went into receivership. After various refinancings, the American Fletcher National Bank of Indianapolis purchased the Monroe assets in January 1922. In March of the next year, Strattan Motors Corporation bought the Monroe company. Frank E Strattan, the owner of Strattan Motors, was rumored to be also considering purchasing the Premier factory, also in Indianapolis. Strattan declared that the Monroe would continue to be built, but be joined by a lower-priced car called the Strattan. Just a few months later, in order to concentrate on his Strattan car, Frank Strattan sold the Monroe company to Frederick Barrows of Premier. After this latest purchase, the company was organized as Monroe Motors, Inc., but soon it was absorbed by the Premier company. The last Monroes transformed into the Premier Model B.
