= Colonial Inn =

Colonial Inn may refer to:

- Colonial Inn (Ogunquit, Maine)
- Concord's Colonial Inn, Concord, Massachusetts

== See also ==
- Colonial Hotel (disambiguation)
