= Colonial (Shaw automobile) =

Defunct American motor vehicle manufacturer

The Shaw renamed the Colonial for 1921, was an American luxury automobile that was manufactured in Chicago, Illinois from 1920 until 1921. At the end of 1921 the Colonial was rebranded the Ambassador.

== History ==
Walden W. Shaw and John D. Hertz, owners of the Walden W. Shaw Livery Corporation, decided they wanted to expand into the production car market with a luxury car. Walden W. Shaw Livery Corporation owned the Yellow Cab Manufacturing Company. The new luxury automobile was introduced as a Shaw at the Hotel Congress during Chicago Automobile Show week in February 1920.

With Shaw taxicabs being so well known, using the Shaw name for a luxury car would not help sales so the name was changed to Colonial. This may have been no improvement, as several car makes had already been called Colonial. The Colonial was built on a 136-inch wheelbase and was offered as a 2, 4 or 7 passenger touring car priced at $5,000, equivalent to $80,357 in 2025.

Shaw and Hertz also change their mind about the engine. Initially it was a four-cylinder Rochester-Duesenberg. By July 1920, that unit was replaced by a Weidely twelve-cylinder to boost sales using the cachet of more cylinders. By the time of the Chicago Automobile Show of 1921, John Hertz was in complete charge of the company and he reintroduced the same car with a new Continental engine and a new name, the Ambassador.
