= Kia Ray (concept car) =

Kia Ray PHEV
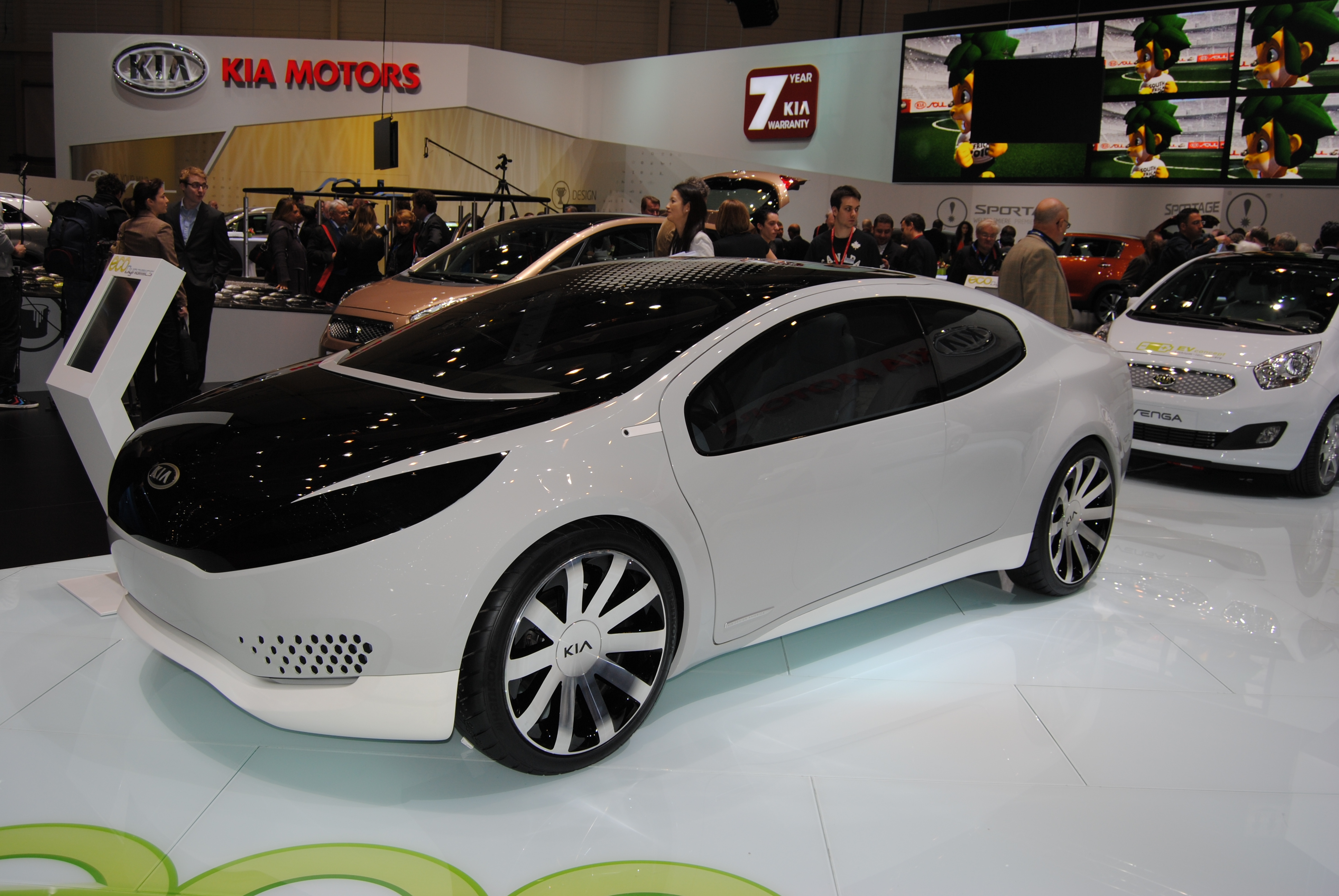

Overview
- Manufacturer: Kia
- Production: 2010 (Concept car)

Body and chassis
- Class: Mid-size car
- Body style: 4-door sedan
- Layout: Front-engine, all-wheel-drive
- Related: Kia Optima; Hyundai Sonata

Powertrain
- Engine: 78kW electric motor
- Transmission: CVT

Dimensions
- Wheelbase: 106.3 in (2,700 mm)
- Length: 173.2 in (4,399 mm)
- Width: 72.8 in (1,849 mm)
- Height: 53.5 in (1,359 mm)

The Kia Ray concept car is a prototype of a car that is designed to be a fuel-efficient, environmentally conscious vehicle. At the 2010 Chicago Auto Show, Kia Motors entered the green car competition with the Kia Ray, unveiling this plug-in hybrid prototype that can be electrically recharged through a standard electrical outlet.

== Overview ==
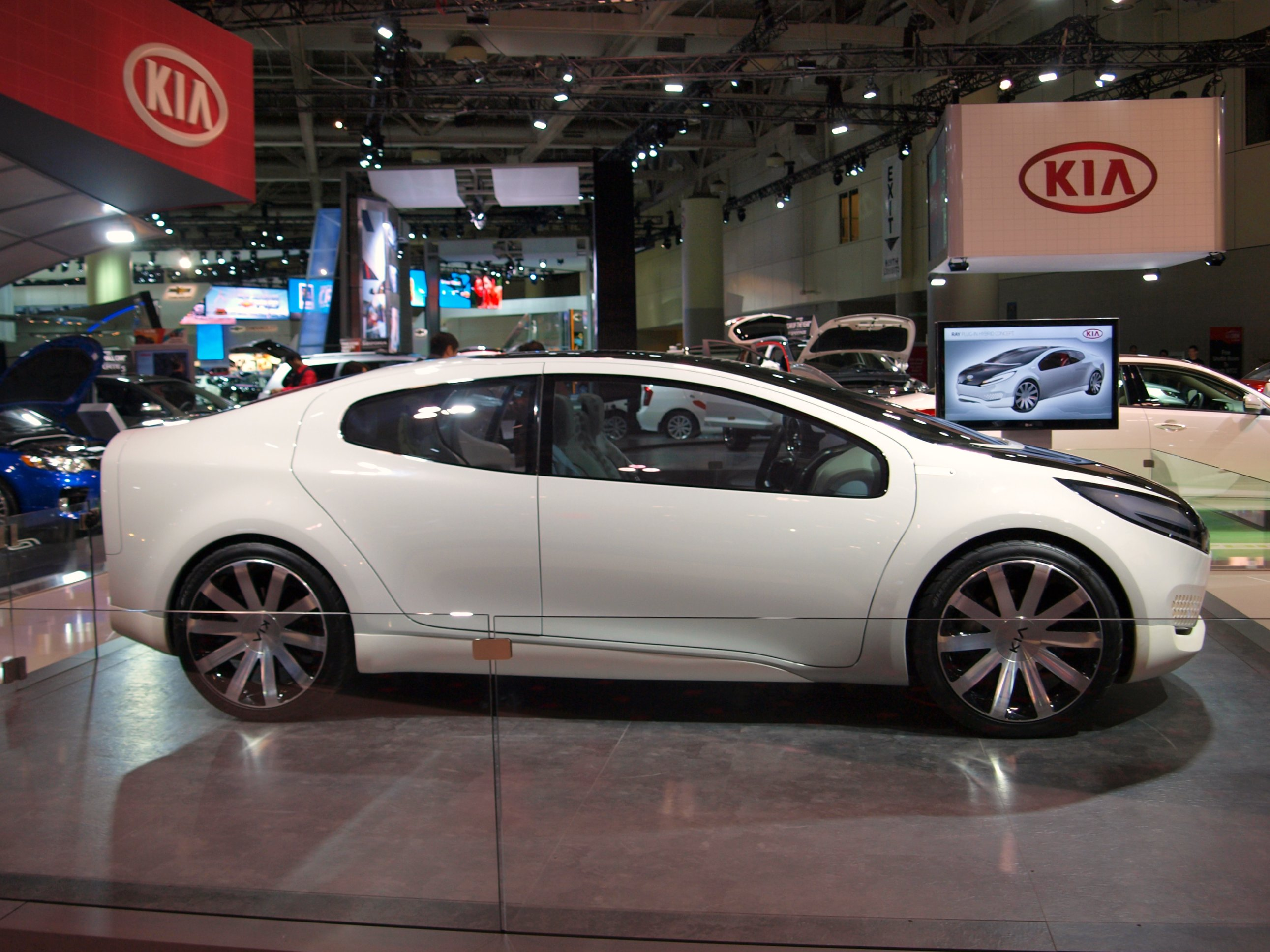
Side view

It has a 106.3 inch wheelbase and an aerodynamic design. The company claims the Kia Ray can cover as many as 50 mi (80 km) without a battery charge. In its bid to be more eco-friendly, the tires are skinny and even the audio system has been designed to use less electricity. According to Car and Driver, the Kia Ray's debut at the 2010 Chicago Auto Show, "represents an ambitious confluence of style and technology, and was arguably one of the strongest traffic-stoppers at the show."

The vehicle is part of the EcoDynamics sub-brand of Kia Motors and is designed to get the gasoline energy equivalent of 202 miles per gallon running on battery power and a range of 746 miles operating as a gasoline hybrid at 74 miles per gallon. The company says the prototype was designed "with lightweight and recycled materials, as well as with hexagonal roof-top solar cells embedded in the glass roof panel that power extra lighting or climate control systems".

If produced, the Kia Ray is in the same class as the Kia Optima and the Hyundai Sonata as a mid-size car and it would have conventional rear doors.

== See also ==
- Kia Ray
- Government incentives for plug-in electric vehicles
- List of battery electric vehicles
- List of modern production plug-in electric vehicles
