= Colonial Theatre =

Colonial Theatre or Colonial Theater may refer to:

in the United States (listed by state)

- Colonial Theatre (Idaho Falls, Idaho), in Bonneville County and opened in 1919
- Colonial Theater (Augusta, Maine), listed on the National Register of Historic Places (NRHP) in Kennebec County
- Colonial Theatre (Hagerstown, Maryland), NRHP-listed in Washington County
- Colonial Theatre (Boston), a Massachusetts theatre that opened in 1900
- Colonial Theatre (Pittsfield, Massachusetts), in Berkshire County and opened in 1903
- Colonial Theatre (Bethlehem, New Hampshire), in Grafton County and opened in 1915
- Colonial Theatre (New York City), opened in 1905
- Colonial Theater (Canton, North Carolina), NRHP-listed in Howard County
- Colonial Theater (Allentown, Pennsylvania), in Lehigh County and opened in 1920
- Colonial Theatre (Harrisburg, Pennsylvania), NRHP-listed in Dauphin County
- Colonial Theatre (Phoenixville, Pennsylvania), in Chester County and opened in 1903
- Colonial Theatre (South Hill, Virginia), NRHP-listed in Mecklenburg County

See also

- Colonial Theatre Complex, NRHP-listed in Laconia, Belknap County, New Hampshire
