= Premier Motor Manufacturing Company =

Defunct American motor vehicle manufacturer

Premier Motor Manufacturing Co. Premier Motor Car Company
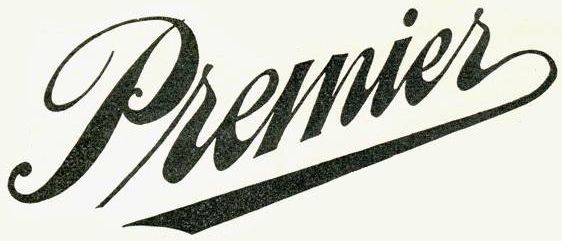
- Industry: Automotive
- Founded: 1903; 123 years ago
- Founder: George A. Weidely and Harold O. Smith
- Defunct: 1926; 100 years ago
- Fate: Sold
- Successor: National Cab & Truck Company
- Headquarters: Indianapolis, Indiana, United States
- Key people: George B. Weidely, Harold O. Smith, F. W. Woodruff, L. S. Skelton, Frederick L. Barrows
- Products: Automobiles
- Production output: 13,971 (1903-1924)

The Premier Motor Manufacturing Company built the brass era and vintage Premier luxury automobile in Indianapolis, Indiana, from 1903 to 1925.

== History ==
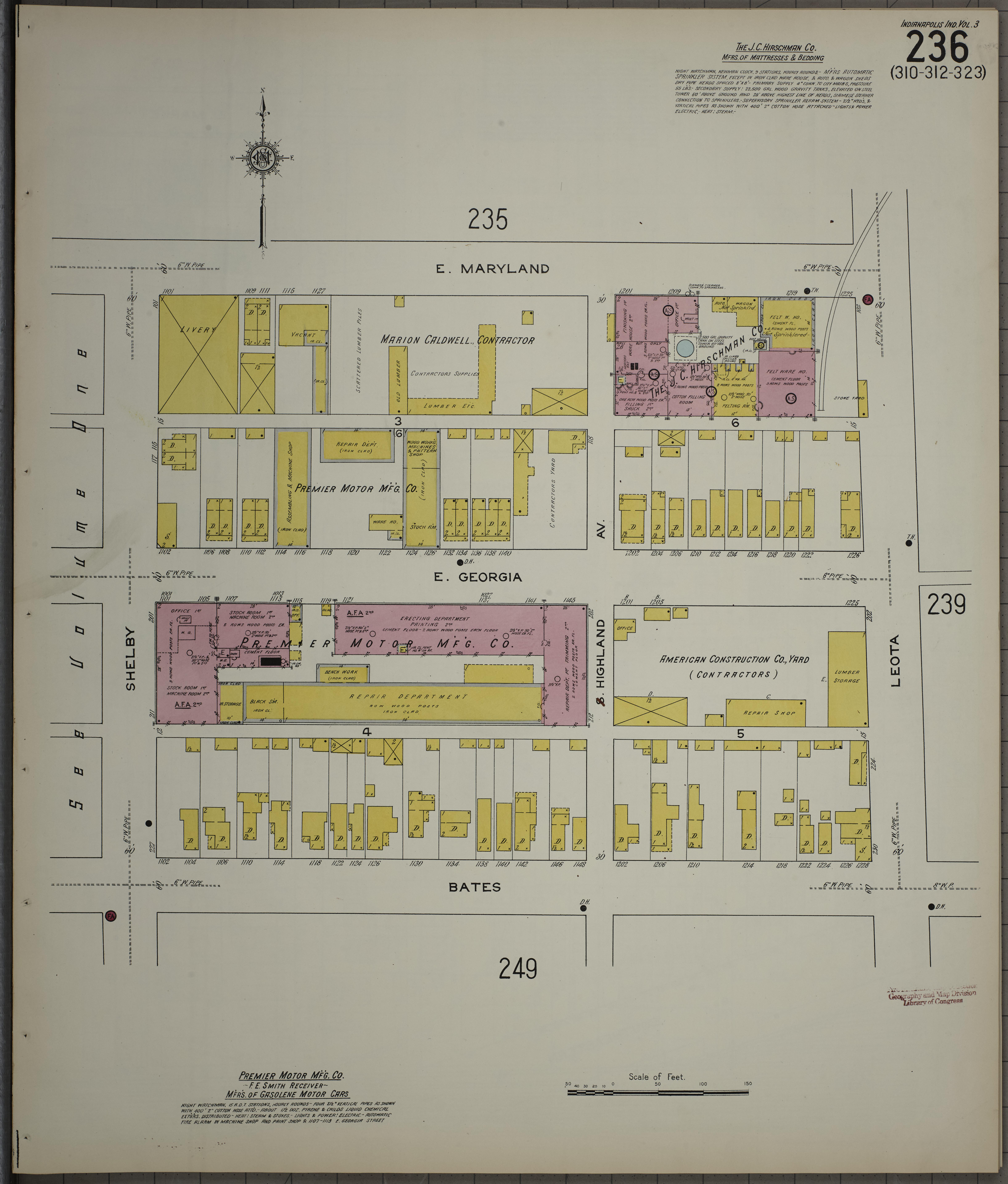
Premier Motor Manufacturing Company plant (1915)

The Premier Motor Manufacturing Company was organized in 1903 by George A. Weidely and Harold O. Smith in Indianapolis, Indiana. The company began automobile production with an advanced design air-cooled engine designed by Weidely.

=== Early models ===
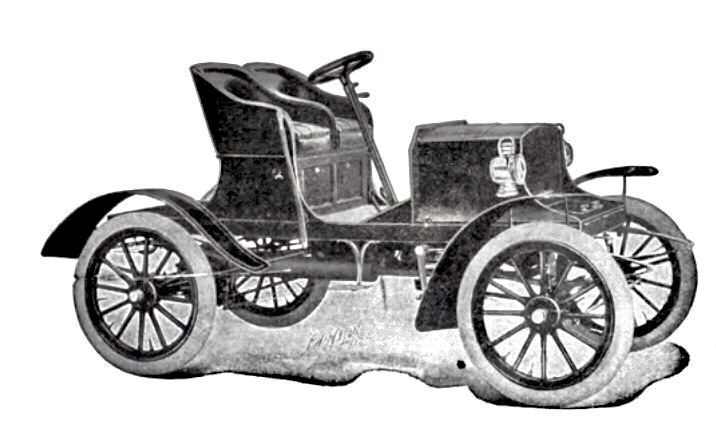
Premier Model A (1903–1904)

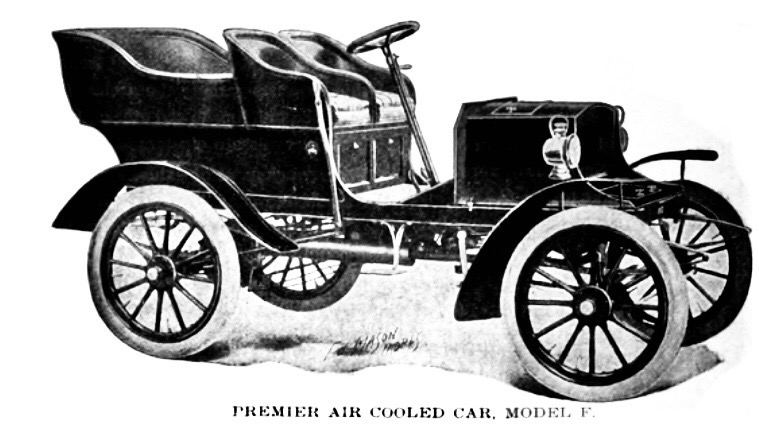
Premier Model F (1904–1906)

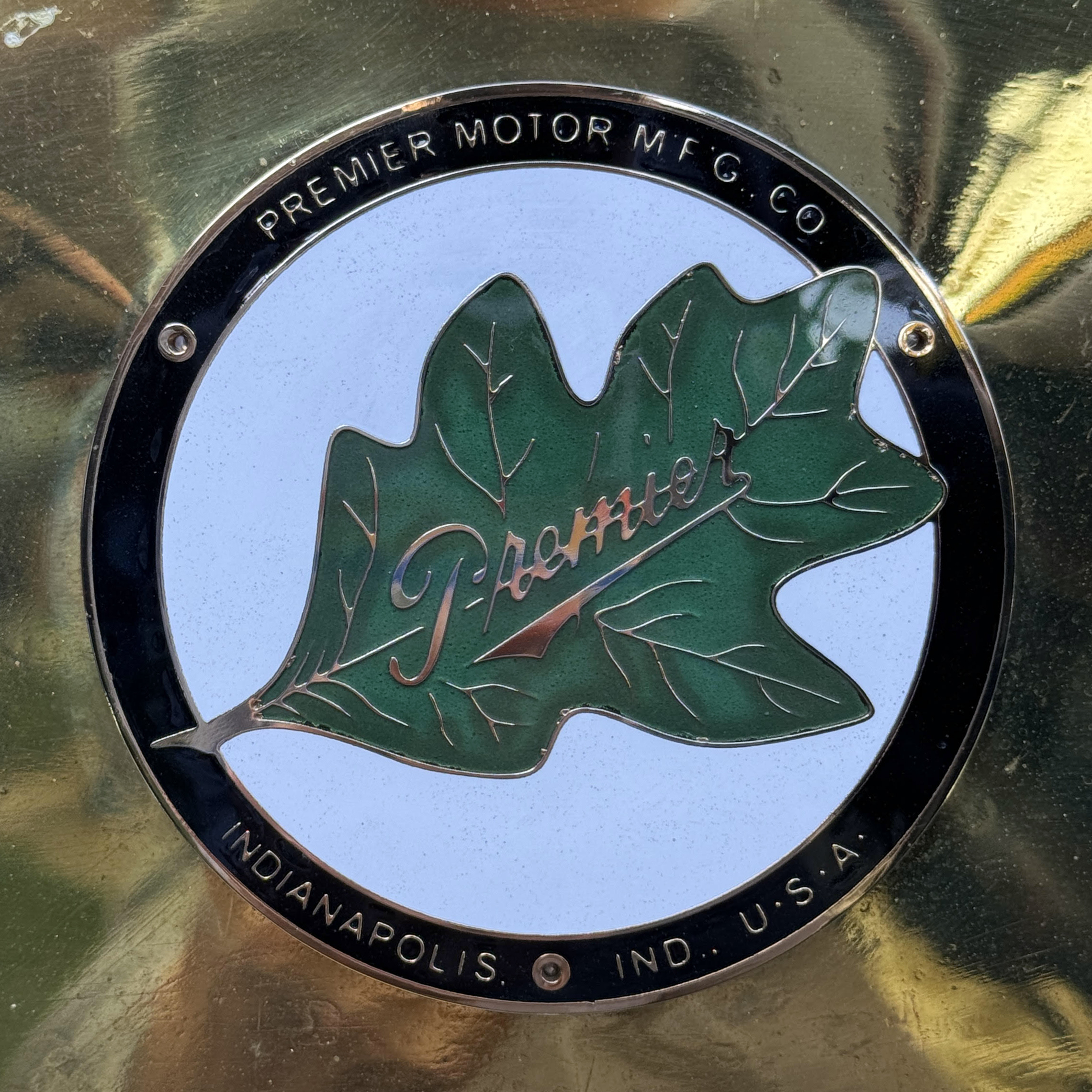
The Oak Leaf logo introduced around 1907

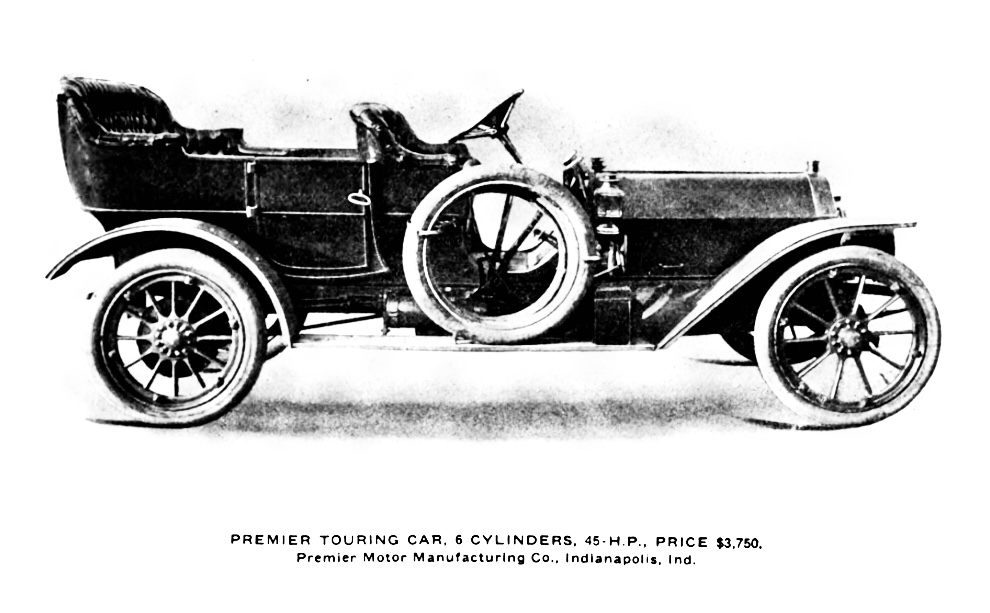
Premier Model 45 (1908)

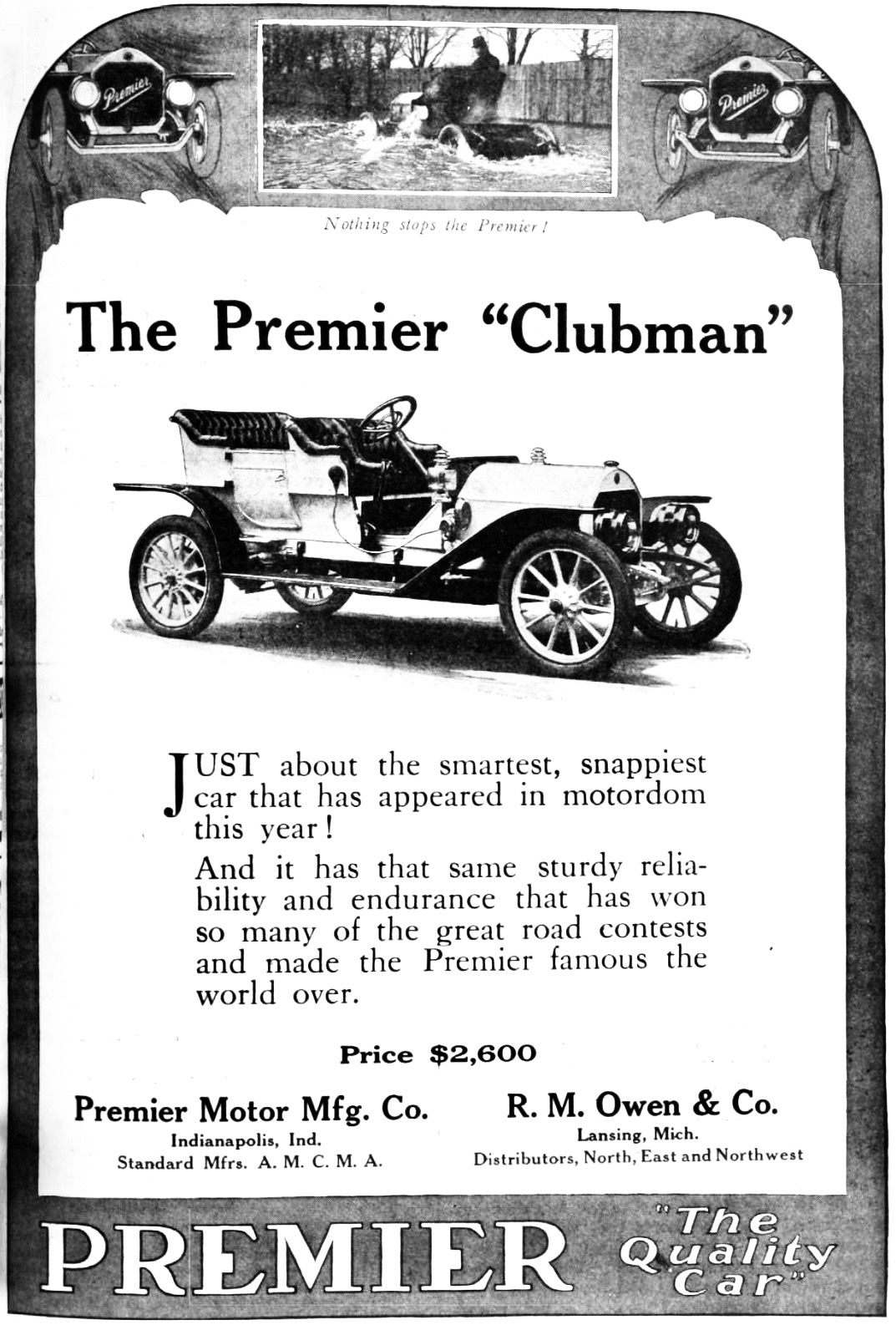
Premier "Clubman" (1909)

The 1904 four-cylinder Premier was a touring car model. Equipped with a tonneau, it could seat six passengers and sold for $1,400, equivalent to $50,167 in 2025. The vertically mounted water-cooled straight-4, situated at the front of the car, produced 40 hp (30 kW). A three-speed sliding transmission was fitted as on Système Panhard cars from Europe. The pressed steel-framed car weighed 2250 lb (1021 kg) and used semi-elliptic springs. A two-cylinder Premier model sold for $2,500. It had a 2-stroke straight-twin engine producing 20 hp (15 kW).

Carl G. Fisher, who later founded the Indianapolis Motor Speedway, had ambitions of contesting the Vanderbilt Cup, and in 1905 George Weidely built an 923 cu in (15.1 L) air-cooled prototype Premier race car for him. The car was disqualified for being 60 pounds overweight, but had tested at doing a quarter mile in 10 seconds.

During 1906, the Model F and Model L were on the market with prices that ranged from $1,250 to $2,250, equivalent to $80,625 in 2025. The cars were advertised as summer and winter vehicles that had a "powerful motor, easy but substantial clutch, buoyant springs and luxurious upholstering."

For 1907, Premier rationalized to one Model 24 with a 24-hp four-cylinder engine and premium pricing from $2,250 to $3,250. Engines and wheelbase sized increased annually and in 1908 a 55-hp six-cylinder Model 45 was introduced on a 124-inch wheelbase priced at $3,750, equivalent to $134,375 in 2025. Weidely developed a water-cooled engine in 1907 and from 1908 all Premiers were water-cooled.

=== Major production ===
From producing 25 cars in 1903, production doubled annually until 250 cars were produced in 1907. The Premier cars, with their large green oak leaf on the radiator badge (often cited as the first use of an emblem as an automotive trademark), built a reputation as builders of superb touring cars. By 1910, they had completed three Glidden tours with a perfect score and reached 1,000 annual production.

By 1913, all Premiers were six-cylinder cars with prices ranging from $2,735 for a roadster to $6,000 for a Deluxe Touring model. In 1914 the company went into receivership and George Weidely and Harold Smith left the company. In the reorganization that followed, Weidely and Smith purchased the Premier engine factory and established Weidely Motors Company for the manufacturing of automobile engines. An Illinois banker named F. W. Woodruff, headed a syndicate that arranged to pay the Premier company's debts and set-up the Premier Motor Car Company.

During the First World War demand for the FWD Model B all wheel drive truck was too great for the Four Wheel Drive Auto Company to meet, so Premier was engaged along with the Peerless Motor Company, Kissel Motor Car Company and Mitchell Motor Car Company to build the Model B under license. One Model B was assembled by Premier in Indianapolis using parts from all four manufacturers to demonstrate that all parts were truly interchangeable. Premier also built 500 FWDs for the British Army in 1916.

In 1916, the Indianapolis Motor Speedway, due to the war in Europe, asked Premier to enter racers for the Indianapolis 500. Three factory prepared cars were entered, one finished seventh, the second crashed, the third went out with a broken oil line.

For 1918 Premier introduced a new car with the tag line "The Aluminum Six with Magnetic Gear Shift". The 65-hp aluminum block engine was designed by Weidely Motors and the electric transmission was made by Cutler-Hammer. The Model 6C was priced from $2,285 to $3,285, equivalent to $70,315 in 2025.

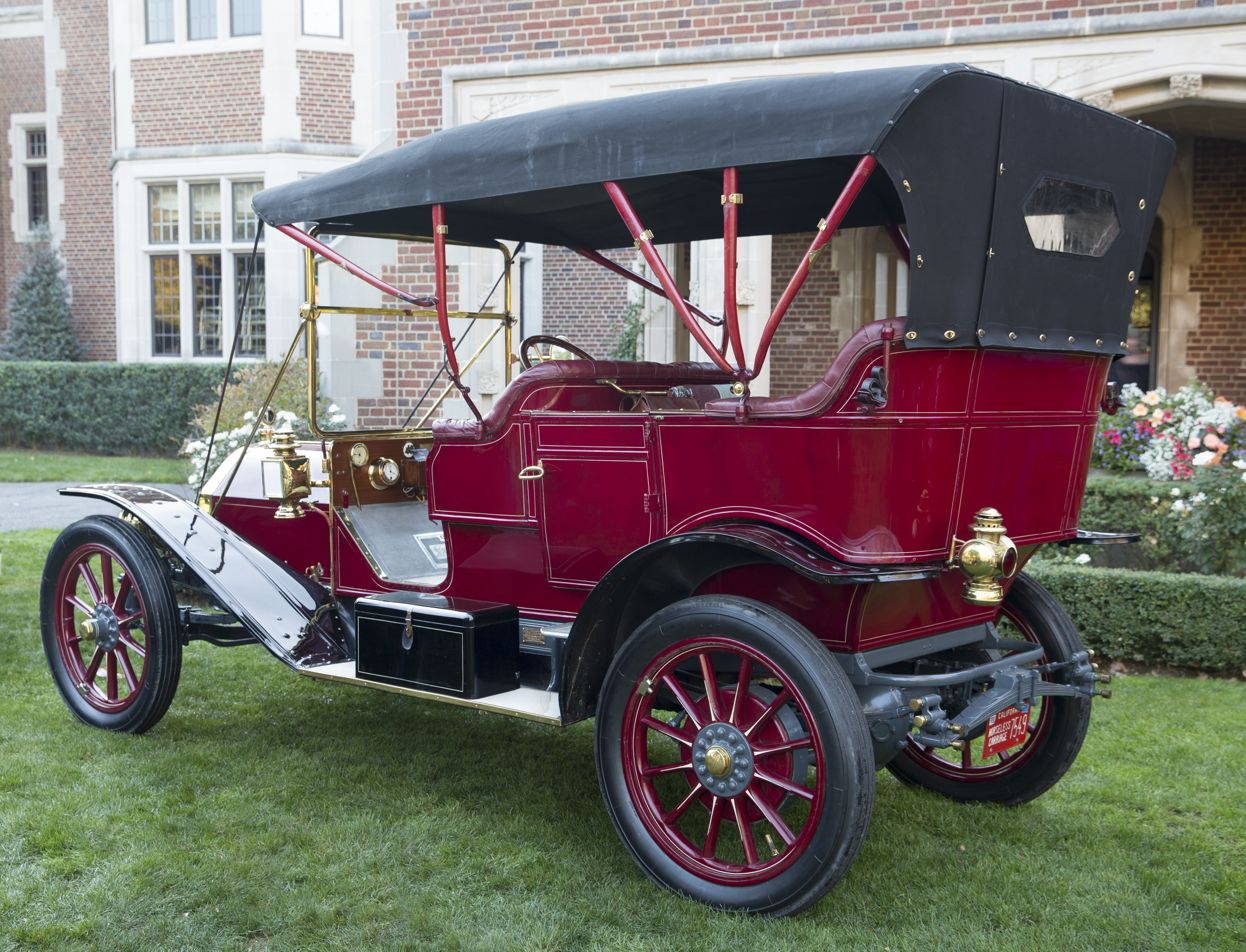
1909 Premier Model 4-40 Touring

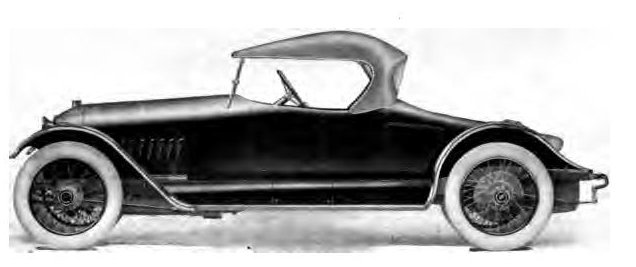
1916 Premier Roadster 6-56

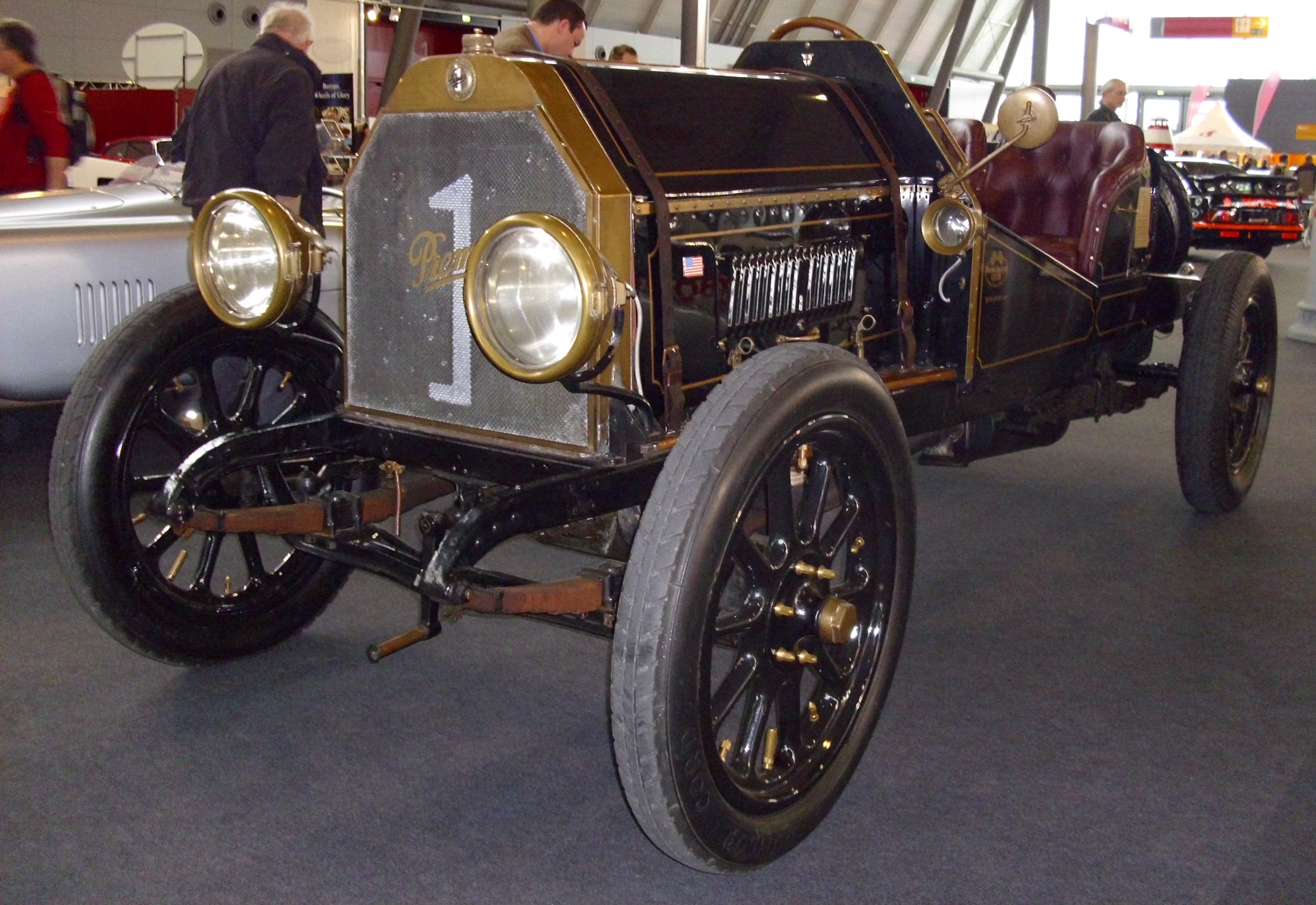
1914 Premier Weidely Model Speedster

=== Decline ===
Prices would climb back to the $4,000 range but production slowed and never recovered to their earlier levels. L. S. Skelton, an Oklahoma physician who had made a fortune in oil, paid off the latest Premier indebtedness and reorganized as the Premier Motor Corporation in 1920. Skelton died in January 1921. After the 1920–21 Depression, the company emerged from a friendly receivership in 1923, when Frederick L. Barrows of Connersville, Indiana, took over and reorganized as Premier Motors, Inc. In 1923 Frederick Barrows of Premier purchased the Monroe automobile company and Monroes became the Premier Model B for 1923.

In 1923, Frederick Barrows received a contract for the building of 1,000 Premier taxicabs, and from 1924 this would be Premier's only product. In October 1926 Premier Motors, Inc. sold out to the National Cab & Truck Company of Indianapolis, which very quickly went out of business.

== Advertisements ==
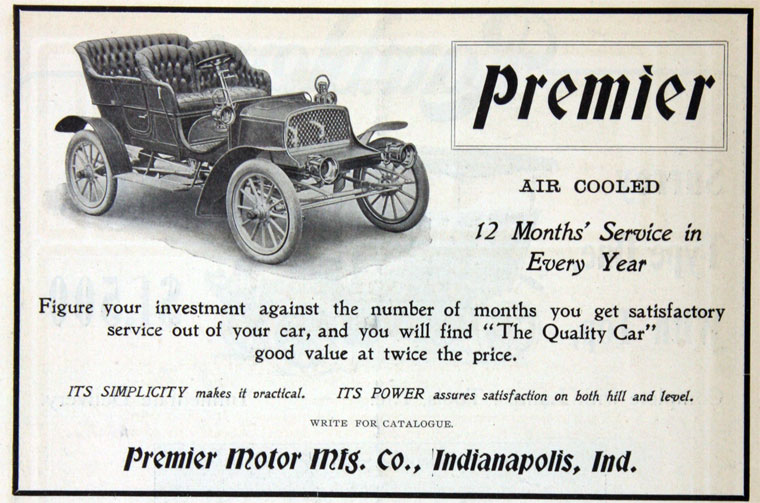
1905 Premier - Air Cooled advertisement

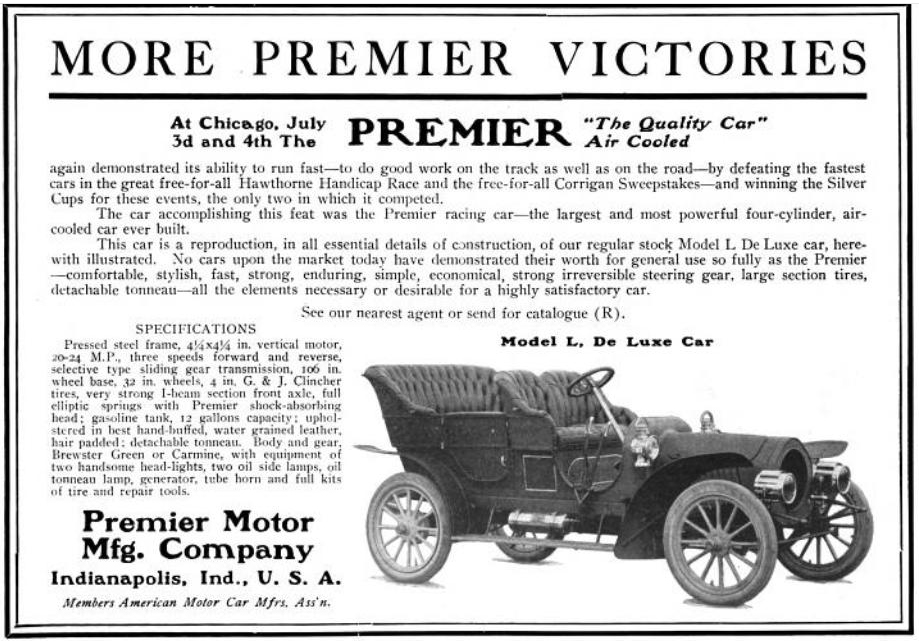
1906 Premier Victories Advertisement

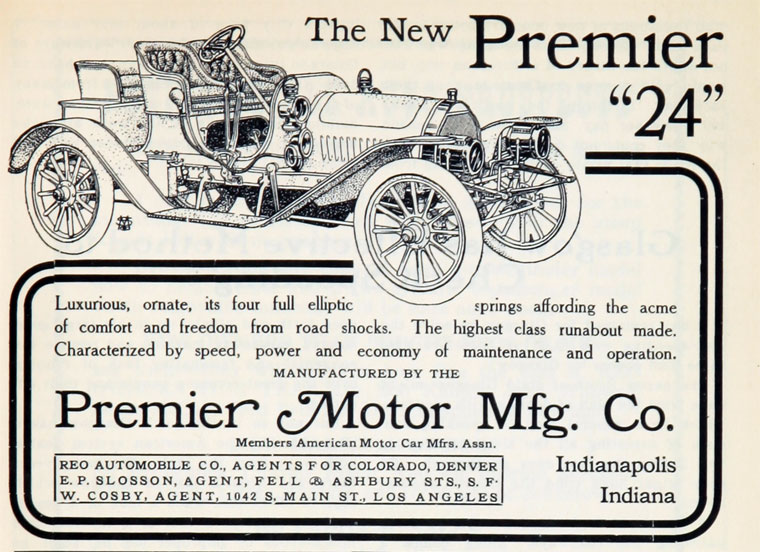
1907 Premier Model 24 advertisement

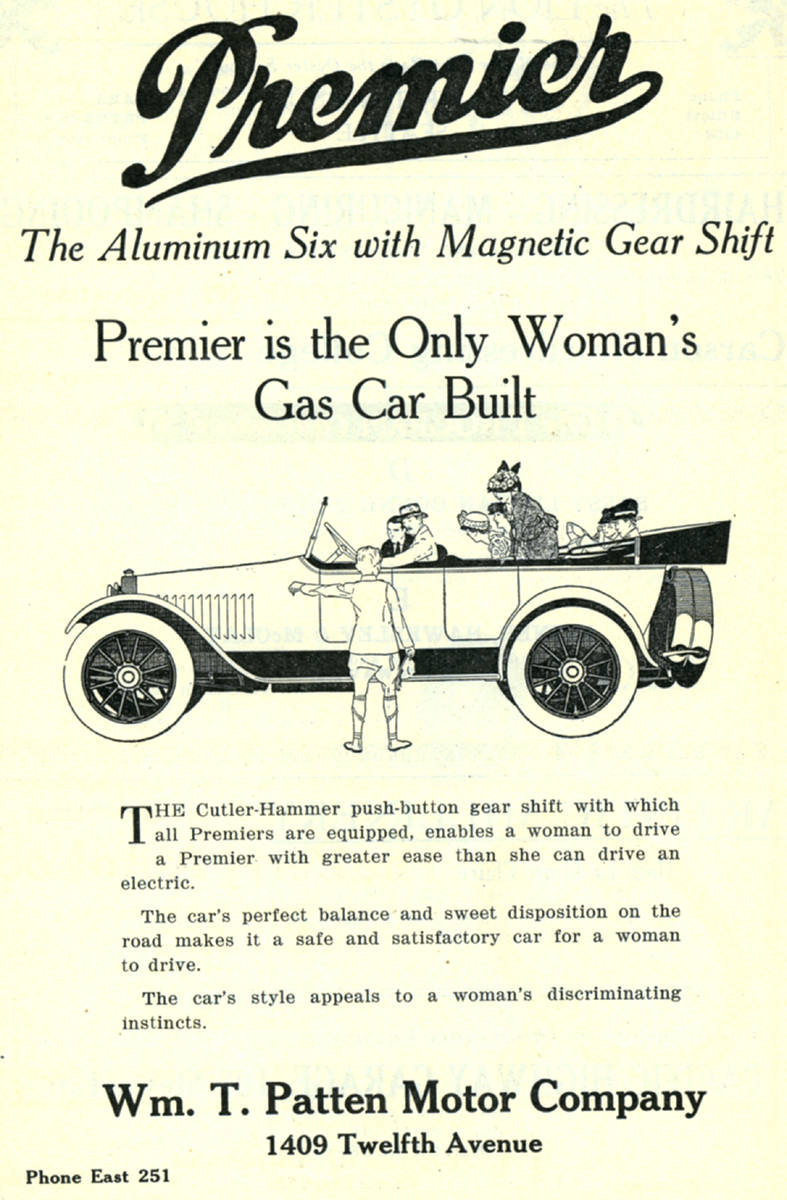
1917 Premier Aluminum Six advertisement

== See also ==
Remaining examples of Premier automobiles are rather rare. A 1905 Premier race car is on display in the Speedway Museum in Indianapolis and a 1918 Premier is on display at Space Farms Zoo and Museum in Sussex, New Jersey. A 1916 Premier is on display at the Auburn Cord Duesenberg Automobile Museum in Auburn, Indiana.

- Premier Automobiles at ConceptCarz
- Carl Fishers World Beater at TheOldMotor
- For Sale: One Slightly Used Racing Car- TheOldMotor
- Frank Leslie's Popular Monthly (January, 1904)
