= Subaru SRD-1 =

Overview
- Production: 1989 (concept)

Body and chassis
- Class: Concept car
- Body style: 5-door station wagon
- Layout: F4

Powertrain
- Engine: 3.3 L EG flat-6

Dimensions
- Wheelbase: 114.4 in (2,906 mm)
- Length: 177.6 in (4,511 mm)
- Width: 78.2 in (1,986 mm)
- Height: 51.6 in (1,311 mm)
- Curb weight: 3,300 lb (1,500 kg)

The Subaru SRD-1 (Subaru Research and Design) was a luxury sports wagon concept car that was never put into production.

== Design ==
SRD-1 was the first concept car from Subaru Research and Design in Cypress, California.

The styling was described as having "a very short nose and long passenger compartment designed to provide plenty of room for people and cargo" at the 1990 Chicago Auto Show. According to the double-sided color placard, the SRD-1 was "an innovative dream wagon concept for the '90s and beyond". The same placard stated that Subaru developed the car because the company "has long been recognized as having the most popular line of import station wagons in the US" and that "to strengthen this leadership position, Subaru Research & Design developed the SRD-1, a family station wagon concept car, with characteristic attention to the future needs of the mature wagon users in the latter half of [the] 1990s".

== Technical ==
It was supplied with a 3.3-liter DOHC 24-valve horizontally opposed 6-cylinder engine and full-time 4-wheel drive with electronically controlled center differential.

== Subaru Research and Development, Inc. ==
Subaru Research and Design (SRD) was founded in California in 1986. The headquarters were moved to Ann Arbor, Michigan in 1998, and the company was renamed Subaru Research and Development, Inc. later that year. The move facilitated SRD's primary mission of supporting emission testing and certification of Subaru vehicles at the EPA National Vehicle and Fuel Emissions Laboratory in Ann Arbor. Other concepts proposed by SRD included:

- SRD-II, a one-seat lightweight vehicle designed to ease gridlock by catering to the single-driver market in southern California which would win a 1994 Discover magazine award.
- SHARC, the "Subaru Highway Automated Response Concept" electric autonomous police vehicle, which won the 2012 Los Angeles Auto Show Design Challenge.

== In popular media ==
- The SRD-1 appeared in the 1991 film Bis ans Ende der Welt.
