= Dodge Rampage Concept =

Overview
- Manufacturer: Dodge (Chrysler)
- Production: 2006
- Designer: Scott Krugger

Body and chassis
- Class: Concept vehicle
- Body style: 4-door pickup truck
- Layout: FF
- Doors: Conventional (front); Sliding (rear)

Powertrain
- Engine: 5.7 L (348 cu in) Hemi V8
- Transmission: 5-speed automatic

The Dodge Rampage was a concept pickup truck created by Dodge that shared a name with a previous production vehicle that was marketed in the early 1980s. The Rampage Concept was first introduced at the 2006 Chicago Auto Show. The Rampage was as wide as the then-current model Dodge Ram and was larger than its 1980s predecessor. "The Rampage was designed as a truck for people who aren't into trucks. More of a nontraditional truck buyer," stated exterior designer Scott Krugger upon its introduction.

== Design ==
The Rampage Concept could accommodate a 5.7 L Hemi engine with Chrysler's Multi-Displacement System; this engine was used in contemporary production vehicles such as the Dodge Ram and Dodge Charger. Like its namesake, the Rampage Concept used front-wheel drive, unusual for a pickup truck. The Rampage also had flared fenders and 22-inch aluminum wheels.

== Features ==
The Rampage Concept featured "Stow 'n Go" seating used in Chrysler minivans of the time, where the seats folded down flush with the cabin floor; this feature was a first for any Chrysler truck. It was also the first Chrysler vehicle to apply this feature on the front passenger seat in addition to the rear seats. Combined with a retractable rear window and midgate, this allowed the bed space to expand into the cabin, at the expense of passenger space. Other distinguishing features of the Rampage Concept were a wide, flat, weatherproof cargo area beneath the bed and an integrated loading ramp.
