= GMC concept vehicles (2000–2019) =

GMC concept vehicles produced between 2000 and 2019 include:

== Terradyne ==
Terradyne
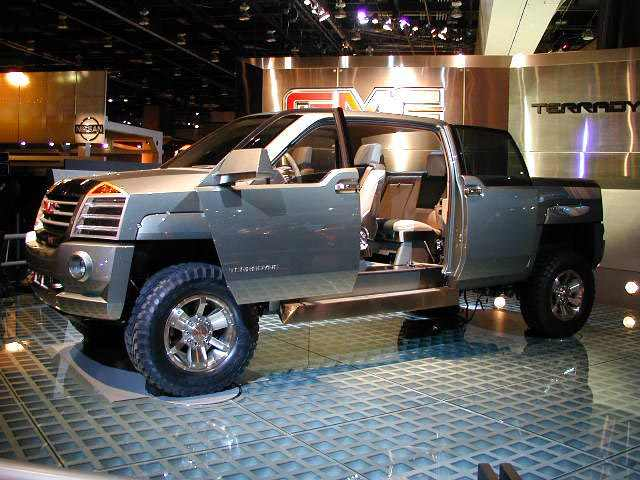

Overview
- Manufacturer: GMC (General Motors)
- Designer: Carl Zipfel

Body and chassis
- Body style: 4-door pickup truck

Powertrain
- Engine: 6.6 L (404 cu in) Duramax V8
- Transmission: 5-speed Allison 1000 automatic

The GMC Terradyne pickup truck was the first concept car produced by GMC and was first displayed to the public at the 2000 North American International Auto Show. It featured a 6.6 L Duramax diesel V8 engine and GMC's Quadrasteer four-wheel steering, which later became a production option on full-size pickups for the 2002 model year. All four doors were designed to part in the middle, sliding toward the front and rear (similarly to minivan doors) rather than swinging outwards. It also featured an extended cab pushed forward to create more room for passengers, and a cargo bed that could be expanded from six feet to eight by means of an extending tailgate and was equipped with 110 and 220 volt power outlets, fed by an onboard engine-driven 5000 watt generator.

== Terracross ==
Terracross

Overview
- Manufacturer: GMC
- Designer: Carl Zipfel

Body and chassis
- Body style: Sport utility vehicle

Powertrain
- Engine: 3.4 L V6
- Transmission: 4-speed automatic

The GMC Terracross was an all-wheel-drive concept SUV unveiled in 2001. It followed a design language similar to that of the preceding Terradyne concept and shared similar sliding rear doors.

Notable features included a three-panel sliding glass roof, and a reconfigurable mid-gate and window that could create a rear cargo compartment separate from the passenger area. This idea was later used on vehicles like the GMC Envoy XUV and Chevrolet Avalanche. Similar to the rear doors of a minivan, the rear doors opened by sliding toward the rear of the vehicle parallel to its sides. There were no B-pillars, and the front passenger seat could swivel to face the rear seating area. The interior of the vehicle was surrounded by translucent green lighting, and it included sophisticated electronics such as a laptop computer integrated into the dashboard and an OnStar system.

== Denali XT ==
Denali XT
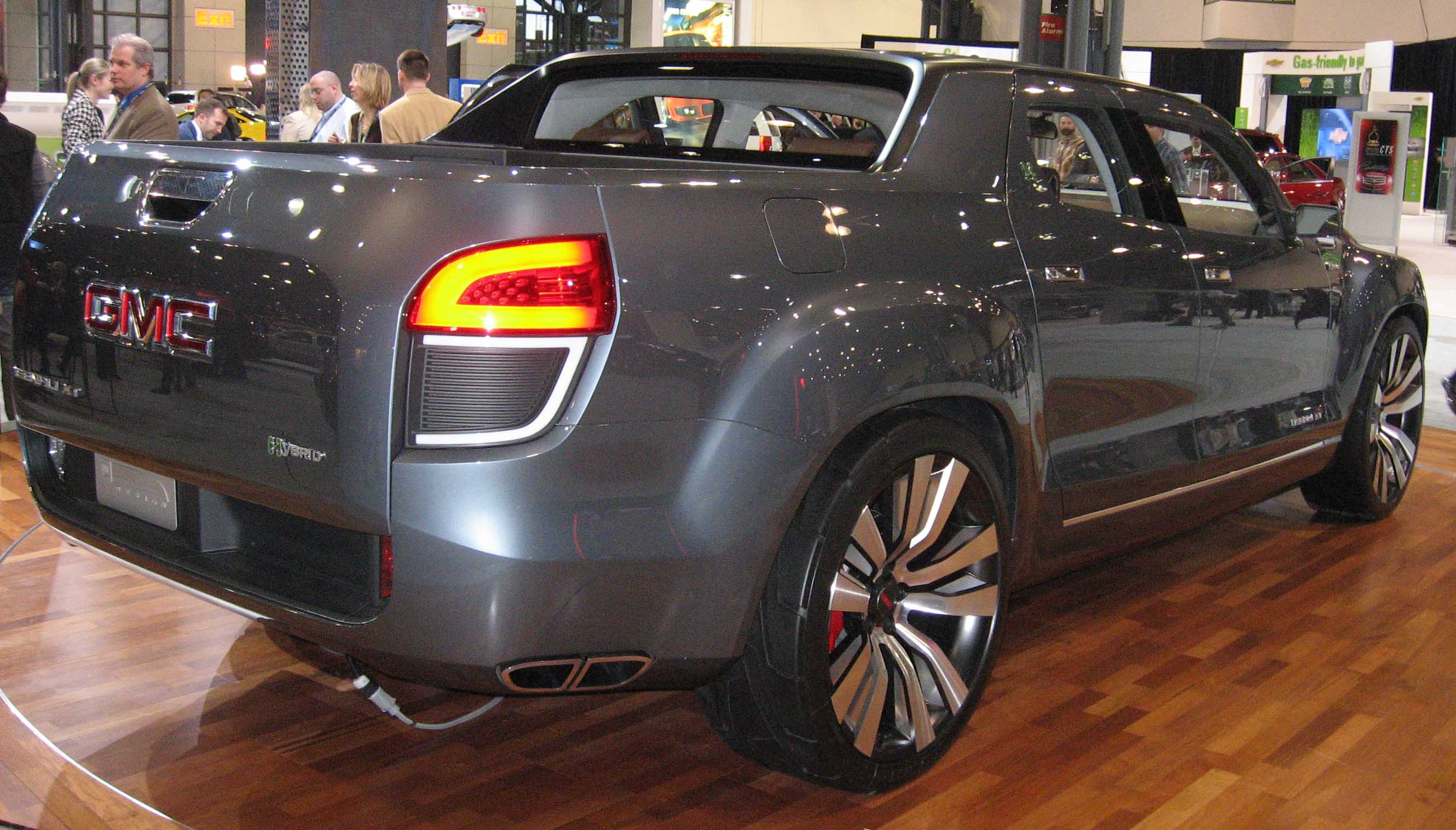

Overview
- Manufacturer: GMC
- Production: 2008

Body and chassis
- Body style: 4-door coupe utility
- Layout: Front engine, rear-wheel drive
- Platform: General Motors Zeta platform

Powertrain
- Engine: 4.9 L V8

Dimensions
- Wheelbase: 125.4 in (3,185 mm)
- Length: 205.0 in (5,207 mm)
- Width: 76.3 in (1,938 mm)
- Height: 62.5 in (1,588 mm)

The GMC Denali XT was a concept coupe utility revealed in February 2008 at the Chicago Auto Show. It was based on the Zeta platform. Its two-mode hybrid powertrain featured a flex-fuel direct-injected 326 horsepower (243 kW) 4.9 L V8 engine with cylinder deactivation. Behind the four-door cab was a 4.5-foot cargo bed, extendable to 6 feet with the mid gate lowered.

== Granite ==
Granite
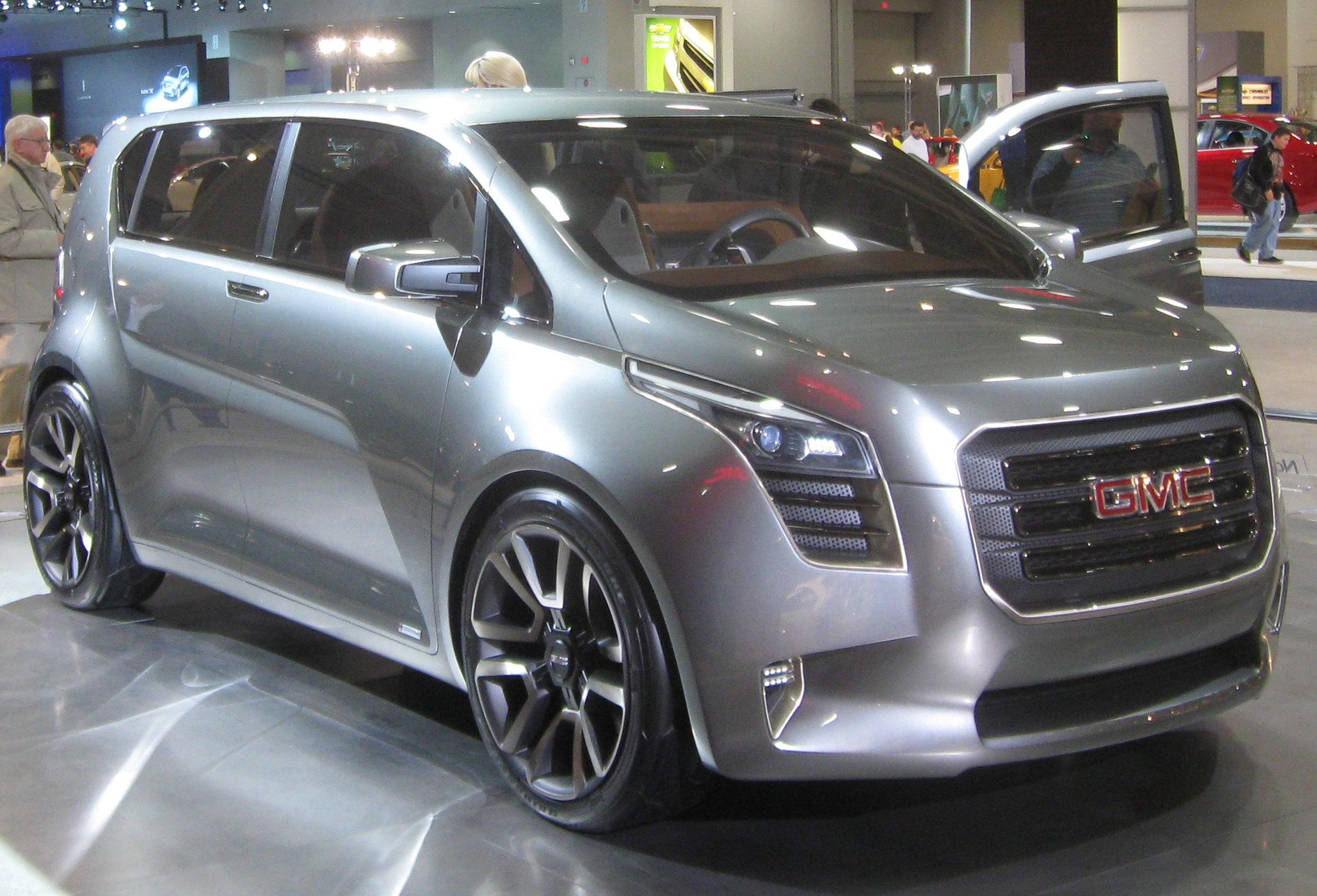

Overview
- Manufacturer: GMC
- Production: 2010
- Designer: Dave Lyon

Body and chassis
- Class: Compact crossover SUV
- Body style: 5-door SUV
- Layout: FF layout

Powertrain
- Engine: 1.4 L Ecotec turbocharged I4
- Transmission: 6-speed automatic

Dimensions
- Wheelbase: 103.6 in (2,630 mm)
- Length: 161.3 in (4,100 mm)
- Width: 70.3 in (1,790 mm)
- Height: 60.5 in (1,540 mm)
- Curb weight: 1,458 kg (3,214 lb)

The GMC Granite was a compact crossover SUV introduced at the 2010 North American International Auto Show in Detroit, Michigan. If produced, the Granite would have been GMC's smallest crossover SUV.

It was powered by a 1.4 L EcoTec turbocharged I4 that produced 138 hp (103 kW) and 148 lb⋅ft (201 N⋅m) of torque, matched to a six-speed automatic transmission.

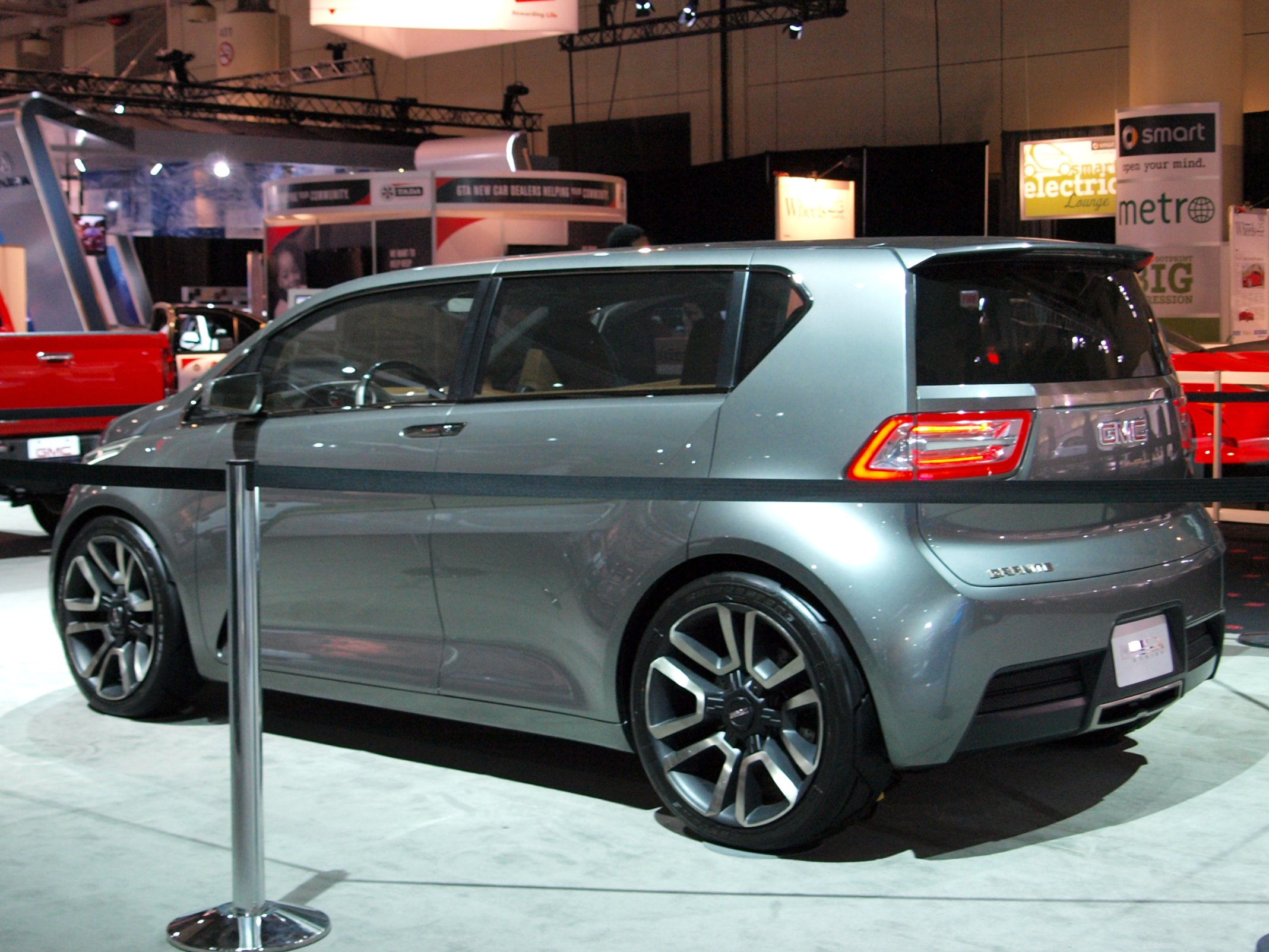
GMC Granite rear view

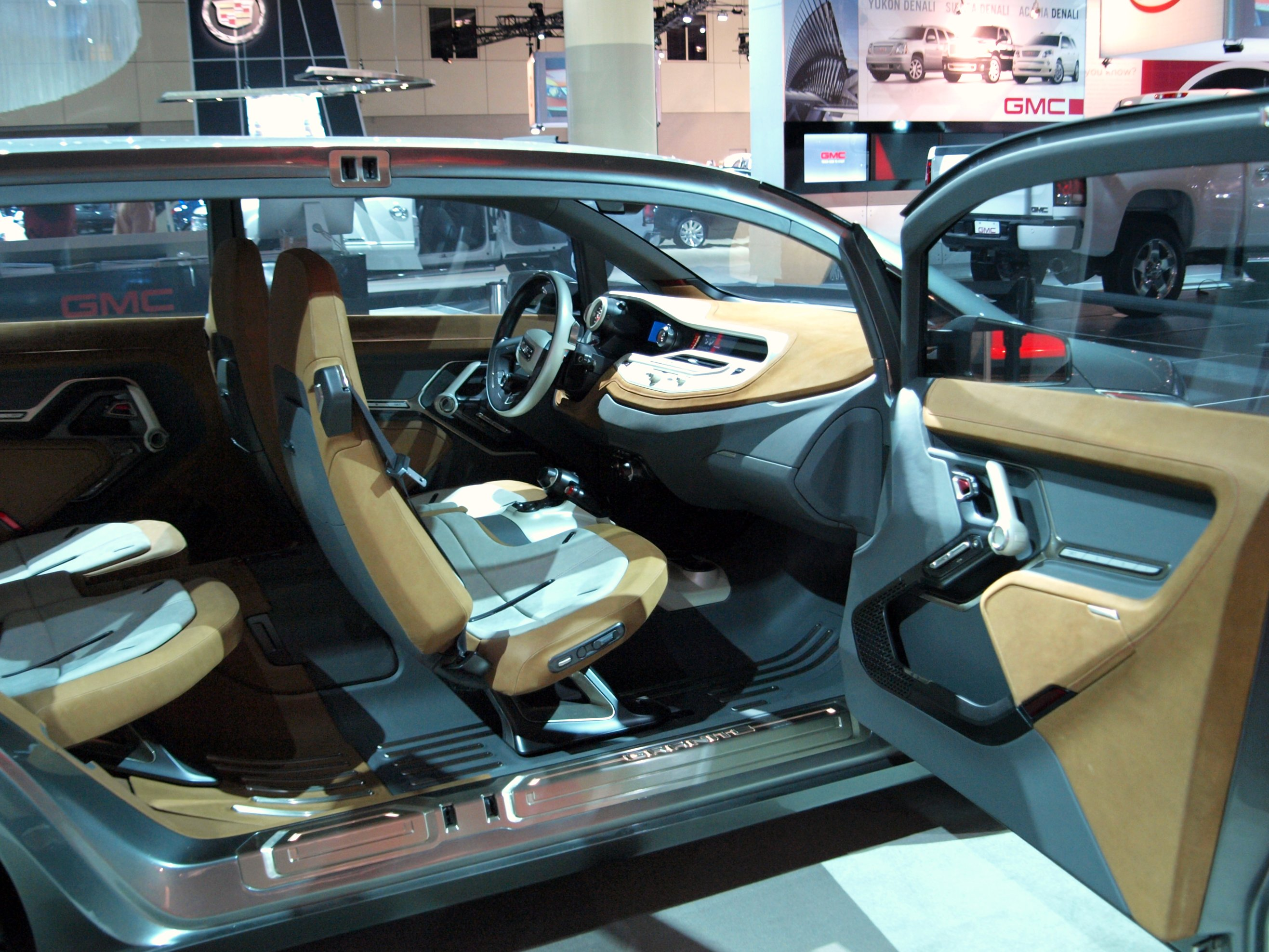
View of the interior
