= Colonial (1921 automobile) =

Defunct American motor vehicle manufacturer

The Colonial was an American automobile manufactured in Boston by the Colonial Motors Corporation from 1921 until 1922.

Although the company pledged to produce "in excess of 100 cars" during its first year in business no more than a dozen are believed to have left the factory. Each car had a 130-inch wheelbase and a six-cylinder Beaver engine. A complete line of open and closed body styles was advertised, but the few completed models all appear to have been open. Disc wheels were a feature of all models, and prices were approximately $5,000 for all body styles.

== See also ==
- Colonial (1920 automobile)
- Colonial (Shaw automobile)
