= HAL (automobile) =

1916 automobile

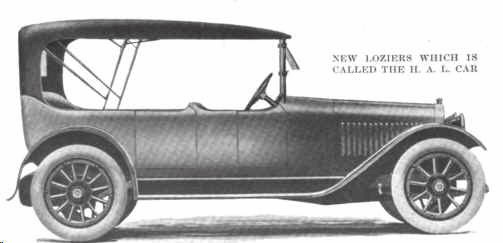
H.A.L. Twelve Touring (1915)

The HAL (or sometimes HAL-Twelve/HAL-12) was a Brass Era car made in Cleveland, Ohio from 1916 to 1918. HAL stands for the initials of the founder—Harry A. Lozier.

Harry Lozier stated in June 1915 that "only an accident... prevented the formation of my company last summer." Harry Lozier was upset that Lozier Motor Company stockholders had taken his decidedly luxury self-named car downmarket. So he did what Ransom E. Olds and Harry C. Stutz did before him—create a new car company using his initials as the name of the car. Thus was the H.A. Lozier Company formed. A prototype using a Weidely V-12 engine was displayed at the New York Automobile Show in January 1916. Production of the $2100 car commenced in Cleveland that summer, though the price would rise as time went on. The former Royal Tourist factory was used, which had been leased from the F.B. Stearns Company. Harry Lozier left the company in September 1916 for health reasons. The company was now renamed the Hal Motor Car Company, with A. Ward Foote of the Foote-Burt Machine Company as president.

Company brochures stated that even though the engines of the HAL-Twelve were rated at 40 hp, they actually developed over 70 at 2000 RPM, and 100 at 3000 RPM. Among the prominent owners of HALs during this period was none other than Warren G. Harding, though he would switch to Locomobiles by the time he became president. The continuing war resulted in materials shortages. There was a rumor in October 1917 that HAL would merge with the Abbott Corporation, recently moved to Cleveland from Detroit. Unfortunately, Abbott declared bankruptcy in January 1918, while the Hal Motor Company was petitioned into involuntary bankruptcy the next month, on creditors' claims of only $1500. The Hal assets were auctioned off in April, thus ending Harry Lozier's 2nd automotive venture named after himself.
