= Colonial (1920 automobile) =

Defunct American motor vehicle manufacturer

The Colonial was an American automobile manufactured in 1920 by the Mechanical Development Corporation of San Francisco.

The car came with a straight-eight engine; it also featured disc wheels, with an extra pair mounted at the side as spares. The body was a hardtop, calibrated so that the driver could turn it into either a sedan or a touring car simply by rearranging the windows. Production models were to sell for $1800, but only the prototype was completed.

The Colonial is chiefly remembered today because it was the first American car to feature four-wheel hydraulic brakes. The Mechanical Development Corporation announced in 1924 that the 1921 prototype would be put into production in a new $2.5 million factory which could build 12,000 cars a year, but these plans never eventualized. The prototype Colonial still survives.

== See also ==
- Colonial (1921 automobile)
- Colonial (Shaw automobile)
