= Chicago Auto Show =

Annual US auto show

- Genre: Auto show
- Dates: Every February; July (2021 show only)
- Frequency: Annually
- Venue: McCormick Place
- Locations: Chicago, Illinois
- Country: United States
- Years active: 1901–1940, 1950–
- Inaugurated: March 23, 1901; 125 years ago
- Organizer: Chicago Automobile Trade Association
- Website: www.chicagoautoshow.com

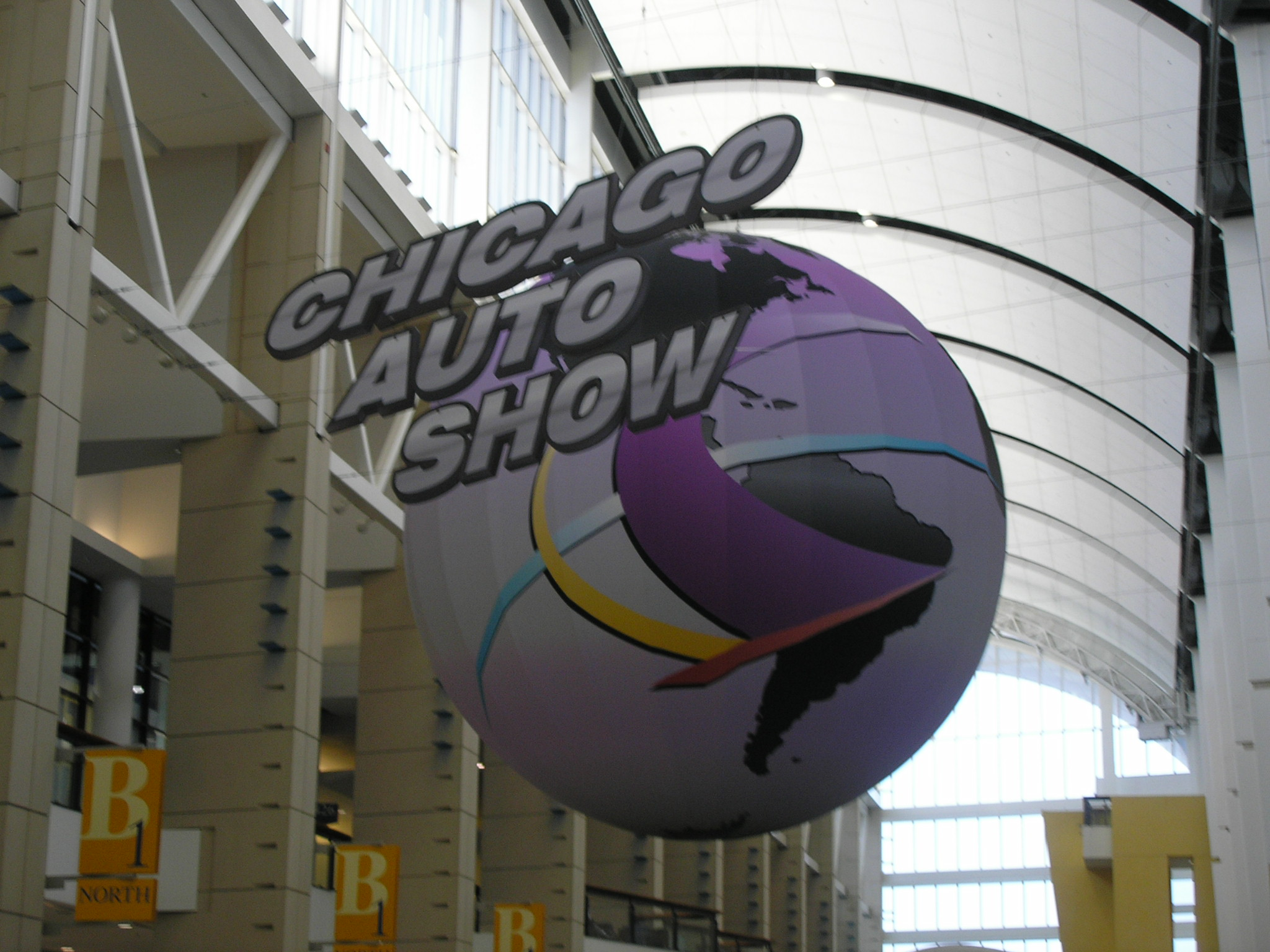
The title for the 2007 Chicago Auto Show.

The Chicago Auto Show is held annually in February at Chicago's McCormick Place convention center. It is the largest auto show in North America.

== Event History ==
Samuel Miles, formerly a promoter of bicycle shows, produced the first "official" Chicago Automobile Show in 1901. The event was staged in March of that year at the third Chicago Coliseum. The 1901 show featured an indoor track for attendees to test drive the ten vehicles exhibited: five electric powered, three steam powered, and two with gasoline engines. The 1902 show saw 100 cars on display; the indoor track was discontinued after the first year to accommodate space requirements for the exhibitors.

By the late 1920s, the automotive industry's maturation resulted in many smaller automobile manufacturers being acquired or replaced by larger ones. The Chicago Auto Show continued to gain prominence during this era and was often regarded as the "National Auto Show". Samuel Miles retired as the Chicago Auto Show's general manager in 1931 after three decades of service.

1935 was characterized by three major changes to the Chicago Auto Show: The Chicago Automobile Trade Association (CATA), the United States' oldest and largest metropolitan automobile dealership organization, became the event's producer and organizer. Also, the show was held twice in calendar year 1935—once in January for the 1935 models, and once in November for the 1936 models. This arrangement was a result of automakers shifting the start of the model year to the fall, based on a recommendation by President Franklin Delano Roosevelt to advance the introduction of new automobile models by two months. Finally, the November 1935 show moved to a much larger venue, the International Amphitheatre.

World War II curtailed production of motor vehicles for consumers in the United States, with the domestic automotive industry retooling to manufacture defense and military equipment. As a result, the Chicago Auto Show was not held between 1941 and 1949.

In 1961, the Chicago Auto Show moved from the International Amphitheatre to the original McCormick Place. The latter facility was destroyed by fire just a month prior to the 1967 show, so the International Amphitheatre resumed its role as the Chicago Auto Show's venue between 1967 and 1970. The show returned to McCormick Place in 1971, when a replacement building was constructed at the site. Additional expansions to McCormick Place toward the end of the 20th century allowed the Chicago Auto Show to become the largest auto show in the United States. The event currently encompasses more than 800,000 square feet in Hall A of McCormick Place's South Building.

== 2026 ==
No newly introduced vehicles were presented at the 2026 show.

== 2025 ==
=== Production car introductions ===
- 2025 Jeep Wagoneer S Limited
- 2025 Subaru Forester Hybrid
- 2026 Subaru Forester Wilderness

== 2024 ==
=== Production car introductions ===
- 2025 Kia Carnival (refresh) (North American debut)
- 2025 Kia K5 (refresh) (North American debut)
- 2024 Nissan Frontier Forsberg Edition

== 2023 ==
=== Production car introductions ===
- 2024 Chevrolet Corvette E-Ray*
- 2024 Chevrolet Trailblazer (refresh)
- 2023 Jeep Wrangler Rubicon 20th Anniversary Edition
- 2024 Subaru Crosstrek (US debut)
- 2024 Toyota Grand Highlander
- 2024 Volkswagen Atlas/Atlas Cross Sport (refresh)

=== Concept car introductions ===
- Ram 1500 Revolution BEV concept*

* auto show debut

== 2022 ==
=== Production car introductions ===
- 2023 BMW iX M60*
- 2023 Chevrolet Blazer (refresh)
- 2022 Ford Bronco Everglades
- 2022 Ford Bronco Raptor*
- 2022 Ford GT Alan Mann Heritage Edition
- 2022 Jeep Grand Cherokee L Limited Black Package
- 2023 Kia Sportage PHEV
- 2022 Ram 1500 "Built to Serve" Firefighter edition
- 2023 Toyota Sequoia*
- 2022 Toyota Tundra Capstone*

* auto show debut

=== Concept car introductions ===
- Nissan Frontier Project 72X, Project Hardbody, and Project Adventure

== 2021 ==
=== Production car introductions ===
- 2022 BMW iX (North American debut)
- 2022 Chevrolet Traverse (refresh)*
- 2022 Ford F-150 Lightning*
- 2022 Ford Maverick*
- 2022 Jeep Compass (refresh)
- 2021 Jeep Wrangler Xtreme Recon Package
- 2022 Kia EV6*
- 2022 Lexus IS 500 Performance Launch Edition*
- 2022 Lexus NX*
- 2022 Nissan Frontier*
- 2022 Nissan Pathfinder*
- 2022 Ram 1500 BackCountry Edition
- 2022 Ram 1500 Laramie G/T & Rebel G/T
- 2022 Ram 1500 Limited 10th Anniversary Edition
- 2022 Toyota 4Runner TRD Sport*
- 2022 Toyota Corolla Cross (North American debut)*
- 2022 Toyota GR 86*
- 2022 Toyota Tacoma TRD Pro 3.0, Trail Edition*
- 2022 Volkswagen Golf GTI, Golf R (North American debut)

=== Concept car introductions ===
- Nissan Z Proto*

* auto show debut

== 2020 ==
=== Production car introductions ===
- 2022 Chevrolet Equinox (refresh)
- 2021 Chrysler Pacifica (refresh)
- 2020 Dodge Durango SRT Black appearance package, redline stripe
- 2020 Ford GT (refresh)
- 2021 Genesis GV80 (auto show debut)
- 2020 Honda Civic Type R (refresh) (US debut)
- 2020 Hyundai Sonata Hybrid (North American debut)
- 2020 Jaguar F-Type (refresh) (North American debut)
- 2020 Jeep Gladiator Mojave, High Altitude
- 2020 Jeep Wrangler Mopar JPP edition
- 2020 Jeep Wrangler High Altitude, Rubicon Recon
- 2020 Kia Cadenza (refresh) (North American debut)
- 2020 Mercedes-Benz Metris Weekender camper van
- 2020 Nissan Frontier (refresh)
- 2021 Toyota Highlander XSE
- 2021 Toyota Tacoma, Tundra, Sequoia Nightshade
- 2021 Toyota Tacoma, Tundra, 4Runner Trail
- 2021 Volkswagen Atlas (refresh)

== 2019 ==
=== Production car introductions ===
- 2020 Alfa Romeo 4C Spider Italia
- 2019 Cadillac XT5 Sport package
- 2020 Chevrolet Silverado HD
- 2019 Chrysler Pacifica, Dodge Grand Caravan 35th Anniversary Edition
- 2020 Ford F-Series Super Duty (refresh)
- 2020 Kia Forte GT-Line
- 2020 Kia Sportage (refresh)
- 2019 Lexus LC 500 Inspiration Series
- 2019 Lexus NX F Sport Black Line Edition
- 2019 Mazda MX-5 Miata 30th Anniversary Edition
- 2019 Nissan Pathfinder Rock Creek Edition
- 2020 Nissan Rogue Sport (refresh)
- 2019 Ram 1500 with multifunction tailgate
- 2019 Ram 4500/5500 HD Chassis Cab
- 2020 Range Rover Evoque (North American debut)
- 2020 Subaru Legacy
- 2020 Toyota Land Cruiser Heritage Edition
- 2020 Toyota RAV4 TRD Off-Road
- 2020 Toyota Sequoia TRD Pro
- 2020 Toyota Tacoma (refresh)
- 2019 Volkswagen Jetta GLI

== 2018 ==
=== Production car introductions ===
- 2018 Chevrolet Traverse RS
- 2018 Dodge Durango SRT with Mopar performance parts
- 2018 Fiat 500 (U.S. spec refresh)
- 2019 Ford Edge Titanium Elite
- 2019 Ford Transit Connect Wagon (refresh)
- 2018 Hyundai Sonata Hybrid & PlugIn Hybrid (refresh)
- 2018 Lexus RC F, GS F 10th Anniversary Editions
- 2018 Mazda MX-5 RF (minor refresh)
- 2018 Nissan Titan/Titan XD with ICON Vehicle Dynamics lift kit
- 2019 Ram 1500 with Mopar accessories
- 2018 Subaru 50th Anniversary Editions (BRZ, Forester, Impreza, Legacy, Outback, WRX STI, XV)
- 2019 Toyota Tacoma, Tundra, 4Runner TRD Pro
- 2019 Volkswagen Arteon (North American debut)

=== Concept car introductions ===
- Nissan 370Zki
- Nissan Armada Snow Patrol

=== Race car introductions ===
- Hyundai i30 N TCR (North American debut)

== 2017 ==
=== Production car introductions ===
- 2017/2018 Chevrolet Redline Series special editions (Cruze, Malibu, Camaro, Trax, Equinox, Traverse, Colorado, Silverado)
- 2017 Chrysler Pacifica BraunAbility wheelchair accessible van
- 2018 Dodge Durango SRT
- 2017 Mopar Dodge Challenger
- 2018 Ford Expedition
- 2018 Hyundai Elantra GT (North American debut)
- 2017 Infiniti Q50 3.0t, QX80 Signature Edition
- 2017 Jeep Wrangler Rubicon Recon
- 2017 Mitsubishi Outlander Sport Limited Edition
- 2017 Nissan Altima, Murano, Pathfinder, Rogue, Sentra Midnight Edition
- 2017 Nissan Titan King Cab
- 2017 Ram 1500 Copper Sport
- 2017 Ram 2500/3500 HD Night package
- 2018 Subaru Legacy (refresh)
- 2018 Toyota RAV4 Adventure
- 2018 Toyota Sequoia, Tundra TRD Sport

=== Concept car introductions ===
- Mercedes-Benz Metris MasterSolutions Toolbox concept van
- Nissan NV Cargo X
- 2017 Nissan Titan Pro-4X Project Truck
- 2018 Volkswagen Atlas Weekend Edition

== 2016 ==
=== Production car introductions ===
- 2017 Chevrolet Camaro 1LE
- 2016 Chevrolet Silverado/Chevrolet Colorado Midnight Editions
- 2017 Chevrolet Trax (refresh)
- 2016 Chrysler 200S/300S Alloy Edition
- 2017 Ford Escape Sport Appearance Package
- 2017 Ford Explorer BraunAbility MXV
- 2017 Ford Explorer XLT Sport
- 2017 Honda Ridgeline (Shown with newly released optional accessories)
- 2017 Hyundai Santa Fe (refresh)
- 2017 Kia Niro
- 2017 Kia Optima Hybrid, Kia Optima PHEV
- 2016 Mercedes-Benz Sprinter Worker
- 2017 Nissan Armada
- 2017 Ram Power Wagon (refresh)
- 2017 Ram 2500 4x4 Off Road Package
- 2016 Subaru XV Crosstrek Special Edition
- 2017 Toyota Tacoma TRD Pro

=== Concept car introductions ===
- Mercedes-Benz Sprinter Extreme Concept
- Nissan Winter Warriors Concepts

== 2015 ==
=== Production car introductions ===
- 2016 Acura RDX (refresh)
- 2015 Chevrolet Colorado GearOn Edition
- 2016 Chevrolet Equinox (refresh)
- 2015 Chevrolet Silverado Custom
- 2015 Chevrolet Silverado Midnight Edition
- 2016 Ford Police Interceptor Utility (refresh)
- 2016 Honda Pilot
- 2016 Hyundai Elantra GT (refresh)
- 2016 Hyundai Veloster Rally Edition
- 2016 Kia Rio (refresh)
- 2015 Ram 1500 Laramie Limited
- 2016 Toyota Avalon (refresh)
- 2016 Toyota Camry Special Edition
- 2016 Toyota Corolla Special Edition

=== Concept car introductions ===
- Kia Trail'ster (e-AWD)
- 2016 Mazda MX-5 accessories concept
- Mitsubishi Concept GC-PHEV (North American debut)
- Nissan 370Z NISMO Roadster

=== Race car introductions ===
- Nissan GT-R LM NISMO

== 2014 ==
=== Production car introductions ===
- 2014 BMW 740Ld XDrive (U.S. introduction)
- 2015 Chevrolet City Express
- 2015 Chevrolet Tahoe PPV
- 2014 Dodge Journey Crossroad
- 2014 Hyundai Veloster RE:FLEX Edition
- 2014 Kia Optima Hybrid (facelift)
- 2015 Kia Soul EV
- 2015 Lincoln Navigator (facelift)
- 2015 Nissan Versa Note SR
- 2014 SRT Satin Vapor Editions (Challenger, Charger, 300)
- 2015 Subaru Legacy
- 2015 TRD Pro Series (Tundra, Tacoma, 4Runner)
- Volvo S60/V60 Polestar (U.S. debut)

=== Concept car introductions ===
- Kia Niro (U.S. debut)
- Nissan Frontier Diesel Runner

=== Race car introductions ===
- Volkswagen GRC Beetle

== 2013 ==
=== Production car introductions ===
- Chevrolet Cruze Diesel
- Chrysler 300 SRT8 "Core"
- Dodge Challenger R/T Redline,
- Dodge Challenger SRT8 "Core"
- Dodge Charger SRT8 Super Bee
- Kia Forte 5-door
- Mopar '13 Dodge Dart
- Nissan 370Z NISMO
- Nissan GT-R Track Edition
- Nissan Juke NISMO
- Nissan NV200 Cargo Van
- Ram ProMaster 3500 Cargo Van
- Ram ProMaster 3500 Chassis Cab Cutaway
- Scion FR-S Pro/Celebrity Race
- Toyota Tundra Crew Cab 1794 Edition
- Toyota Tundra CrewMax Platinum Package
- TRD Toyota Tundra CrewMax Limited
- Volkswagen Beetle GSR
- Volkswagen Beetle Turbo Convertible R-Line
- Volkswagen GTI Driver's Edition
- Volkswagen GTI Wolfsburg Edition

=== Concept car introductions ===
- Chevrolet "Turbo" Camaro Coupe Concept
- Dodge Charger Defiance Show Car
- Kia Cross GT Concept
- Kia Optima Hybrid "Inspired by Superman" Concept
- Ford Fiesta ST GRC Concept
- Ford Focus TrackSTer Concept

== 2012 ==
Introductions and concepts:

- 2013 Acura ILX (production vehicle)
- 2013 Acura RDX (production vehicle)
- 2013 Chevrolet Corvette 427 Covertible
- 2013 Ford Shelby GT500 Convertible
- 2013 GMC Acadia
- 2013 Hyundai Elantra Coupe
- 2013 Hyundai Elantra GT (North American debut)
- Kia Track'ster concept
- 2012 Mazda MX-5 Miata Special Edition
- 2012 Mopar '12 Chrysler 300
- 2013 Nissan 370Z
- 2013 Nissan NV200 (North American debut)
- 2012 Ram 1500 Laramie Limited
- 2013 Toyota Land Cruiser (North American debut)
- 2013 Volkswagen Beetle TDI

In addition to the factory-built Chrysler 300, Mopar also showed three 75th anniversary accessory kits: the Dodge Dart "GTS 210 Tribute", Fiat 500 "Stinger", and Mopar Jeep Compass "True North".

== 2011 ==
Introductions and concepts:

- 2012 Acura TL
- 2012 Buick Regal with eAssist
- 2012 Chevrolet Camaro ZL1
- 2011 Chrysler 200 Convertible
- 2012 Dodge Charger SRT8
- 2011 Dodge Durango Heat
- 2012 Hyundai Genesis (including 5.0 R-Spec)
- Hyundai Veloster rally car
- 2011 Mazda MX-5 Miata Special Edition
- 2011 Ram 1500 Tradesman
- 2011 Ram 3500 HD
- 2012 Shelby GT350 Convertible
- 2011 Toyota Matrix
- 2012 Volkswagen Jetta GLI

== 2010 ==
Introductions and concepts:

- 2011 BMW Alpina B7 (F01)
- 2011 Chevrolet Silverado 2500 & 3500 HD
- DeltaWing
- 2011 Ford Edge
- 2011 Ford Shelby GT 500
- 2011 Ford Transit Connect Electric
- 2011 Ford Transit Connect Taxi
- 2011 Honda Odyssey (concept)
- 2011 Hyundai Azera
- Kia Ray plug-in hybrid concept
- 2010 Nissan 370Z 40th Anniversary Edition
- 2010 Scion tC RS 6.0 ("Speedway Blue")
- 2011 Toyota Avalon

== 2009 ==
Introductions and concepts:

- 2010 Acura TSX V6
- Chevrolet Corvette Stingray concept
- 2010 Dodge Ram Heavy Duty
- 2010 Ford Harley-Davidson F-150
- 2010 Ford Taurus SHO
- 2010 Hyundai Genesis Coupe R-Spec
- 2010 Kia Forte
- 2009 Mazda MX-5 (North American introduction)
- 2010 Mitsubishi Lancer Sportback (U.S. introduction)
- 2009 Nissan Cube Krom
- 2009 Scion tC RS 5.0 ("Gloss Black")
- 2010 Toyota Tundra

Also, the Ford Transit Connect was re-introduced as an official 2010 model, after pre-production units were displayed for the first time in the U.S. at the previous year's show.

== 2008 ==
Introductions:

- 2009 Acura RL
- 2009 Chevrolet HHR Flexfuel
- 2009 Chevrolet Traverse
- 2008 Dodge Challenger SRT-8
- 2009 Ford Edge Sport
- 2010 Ford Transit Connect (North American debut)
- GMC Denali XT concept
- 2009 GMC Sierra Hybrid
- 2009 Hummer H3T
- 2009 Hyundai Elantra Touring (U.S. debut)
- 2009 Hyundai Sonata
- 2009 Mitsubishi Eclipse
- 2009 Mitsubishi Galant
- 2009 Porsche Cayenne GTS (North American debut)
- 2008 Scion tC RS 4.0 ("Galactic Gray Mica")
- 2009 Suzuki Equator
- 2009 Volkswagen Routan
- 2009 International LoneStar

The show also had a special U.S. Army area, open to the public, which displayed military vehicles and featured Army-related activities and video games.

== 2007 ==
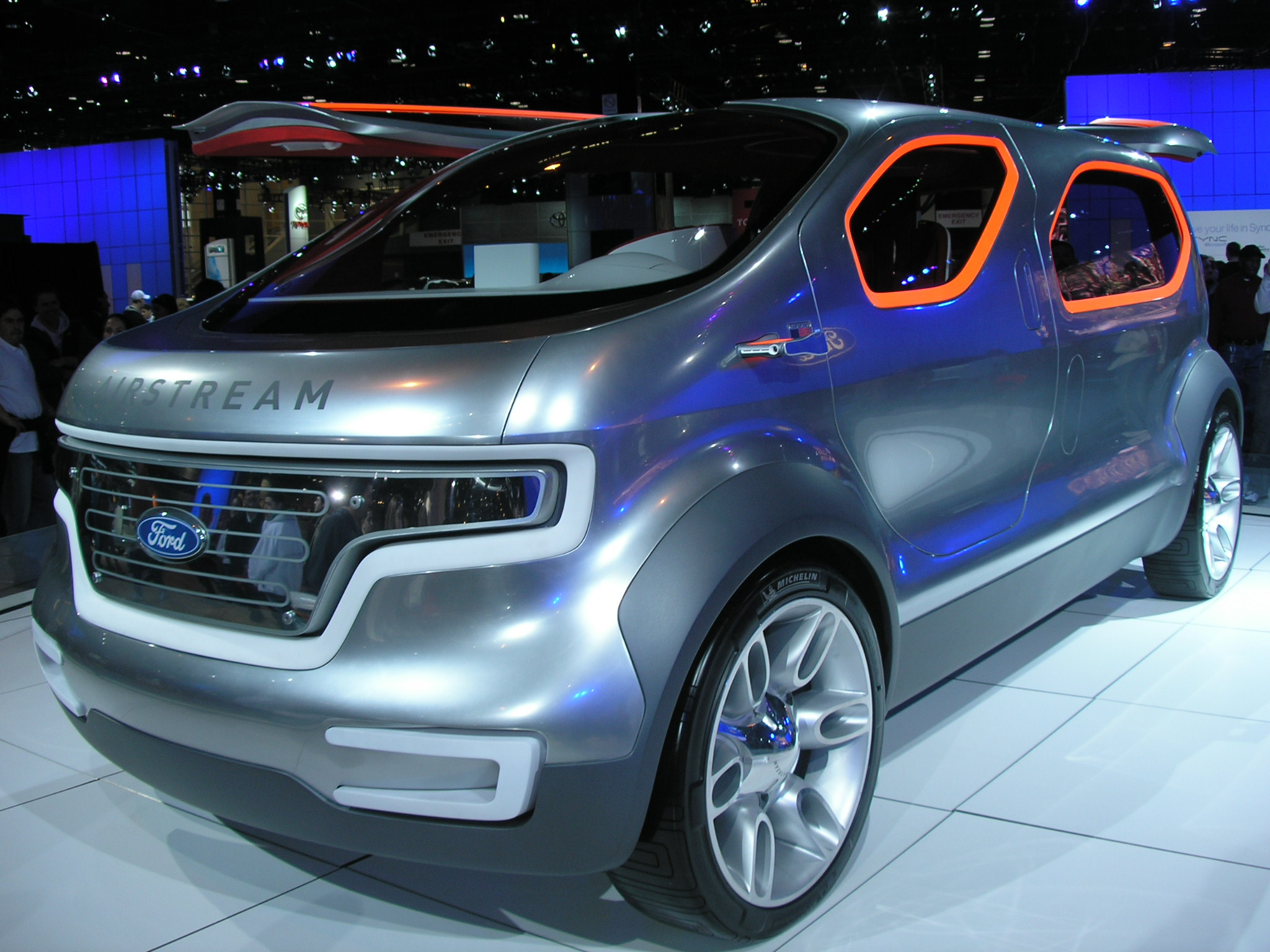
The Ford "Airstream" Concept car.

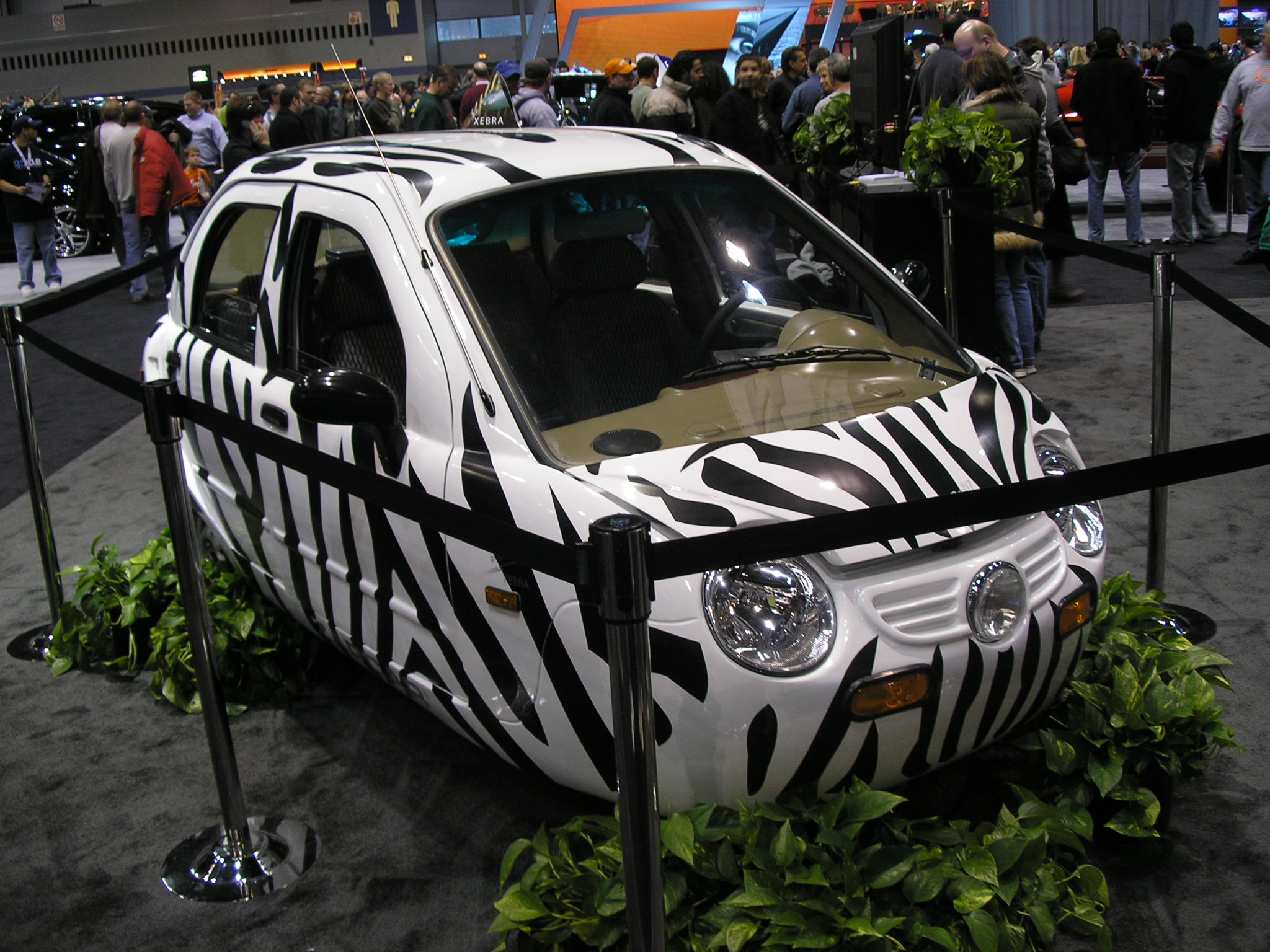
The "Zap" Concept car.

Introductions:

- 2008 BMW 5 Series (North American introduction)
- 2008 Dodge Dakota
- 2008 Ford Taurus (renamed from Ford Five Hundred)
- 2008 Ford Taurus X (renamed from Ford Freestyle)
- Kia Rondo SX concept
- 2008 Mercury Sable (renamed from Mercury Montego)
- 2008 Nissan Armada
- 2008 Nissan Pathfinder
- 2008 Nissan Titan
- 2008 Pontiac G8
- 2007 Porsche 911 GT3 RS (North American introduction)
- 2008 Saturn Astra
- 2008 Saturn Vue Green Line
- 2008 Saturn Vue Red Line
- 2008 Scion xB
- 2008 Scion xD
- 2008 Toyota Highlander
- 2008 Volkswagen R32 (North American introduction)

== 2006 ==
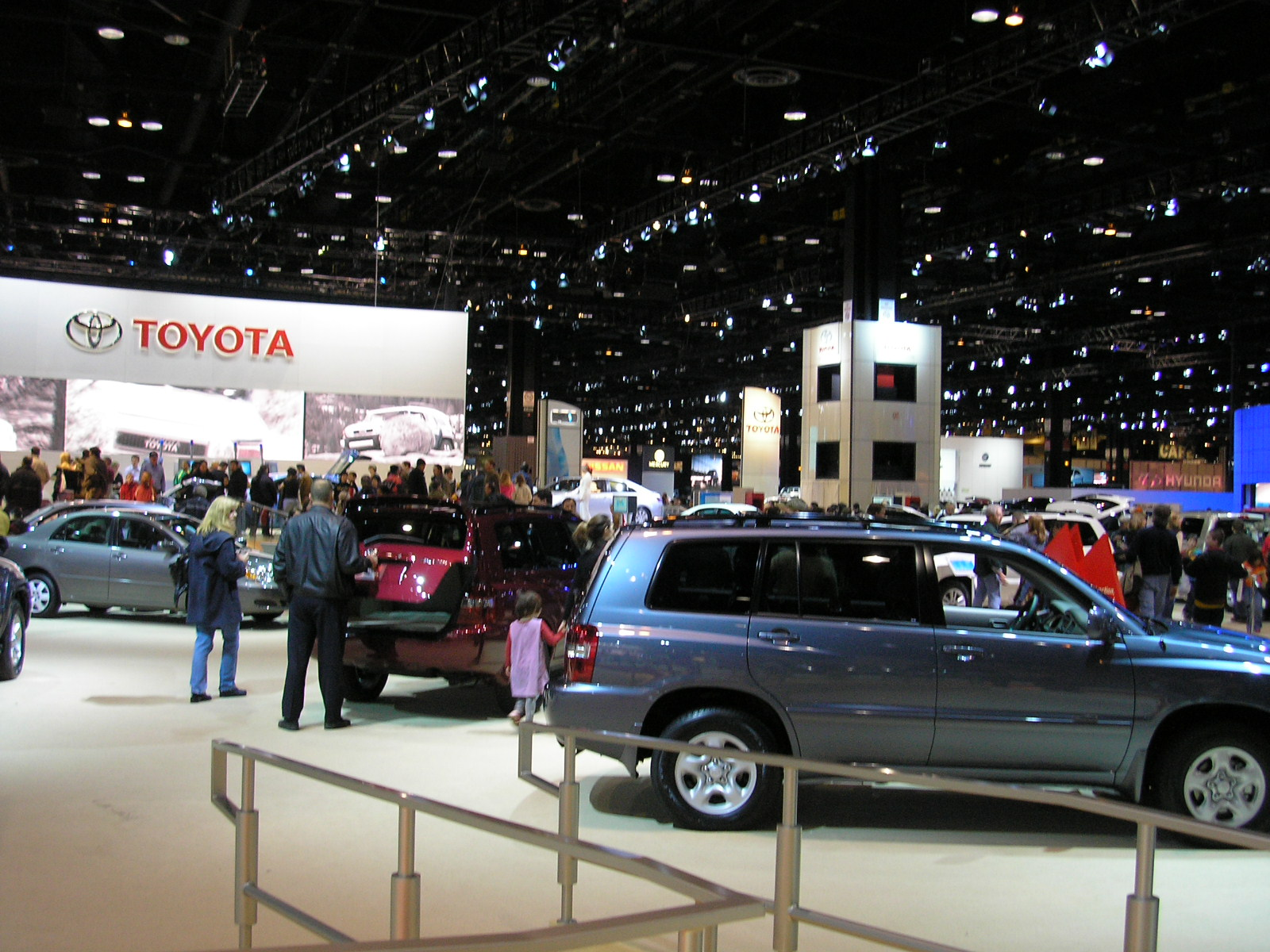
The 2006 Chicago Auto Show.

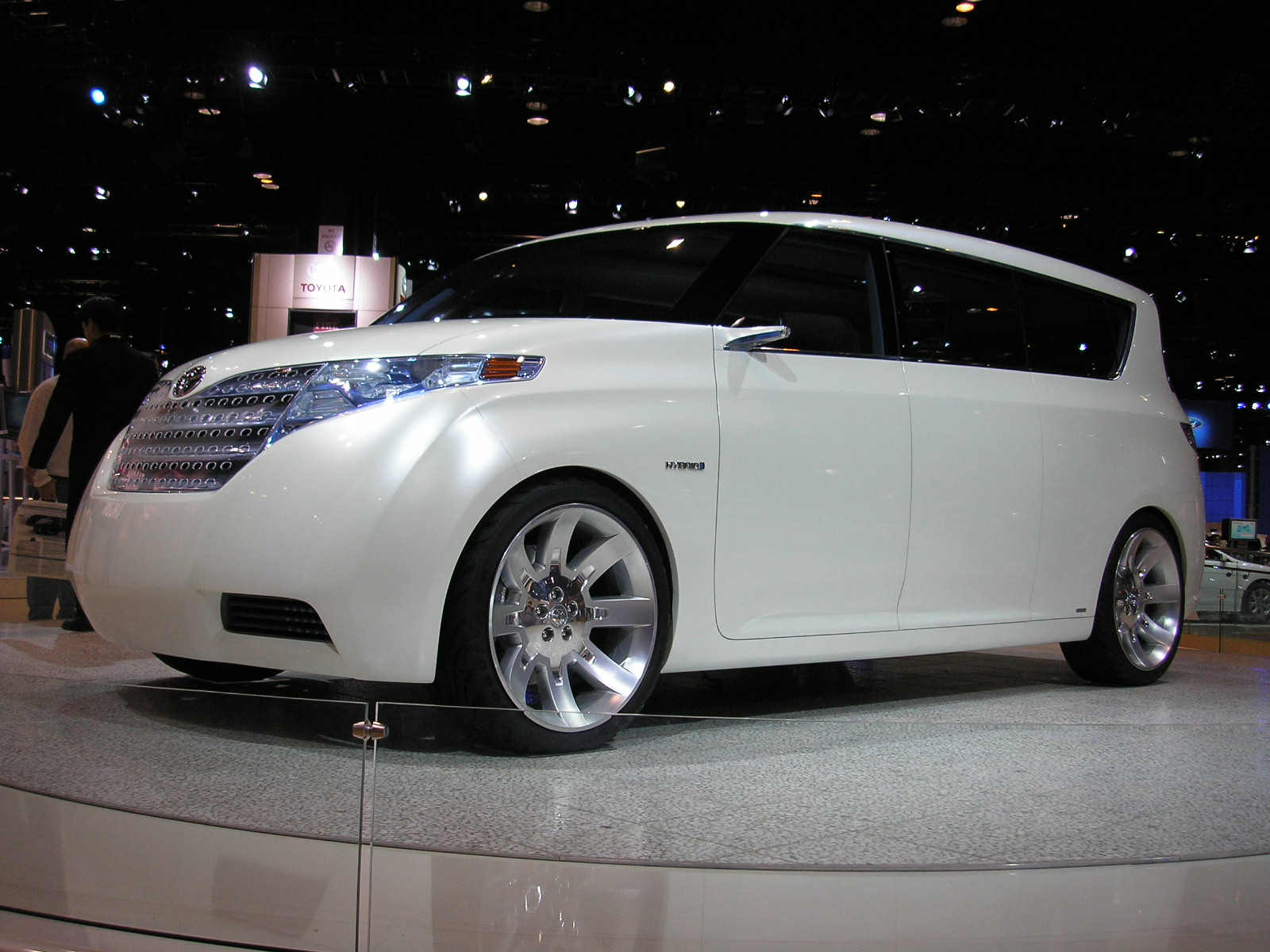
A Toyota concept car shown at the 2006 Chicago Auto Show.

Introductions:

- 2007 Bentley Continental GTC convertible
- 2007 Chevrolet Avalanche
- 2006 Chevrolet Kodiak C4500 (Special Modification)
- 2007 Dodge Caliber SRT-4
- 2007 Dodge Charger Super Bee
- 2007 Dodge Nitro
- Dodge Rampage Concept (front wheel drive pickup)
- 2007 Ford Expedition
- 2007 Hyundai Entourage
- 2006 Hyundai Accent 3-door
- 2007 International MXT
- 2007 International RXT
- 2007 Lexus ES 350
- 2007 Lincoln Navigator/Navigator L
- 2007 Lincoln MKZ (formerly the Lincoln Zephyr)
- 2007 Mercedes-Benz R63 AMG
- 2007 Mitsubishi Galant Ralliart
- 2007 Nissan Quest
- 2007 Subaru B9 Tribeca
- 2007 Toyota Tundra
- 2007 Volkswagen Rabbit

== 2005 ==
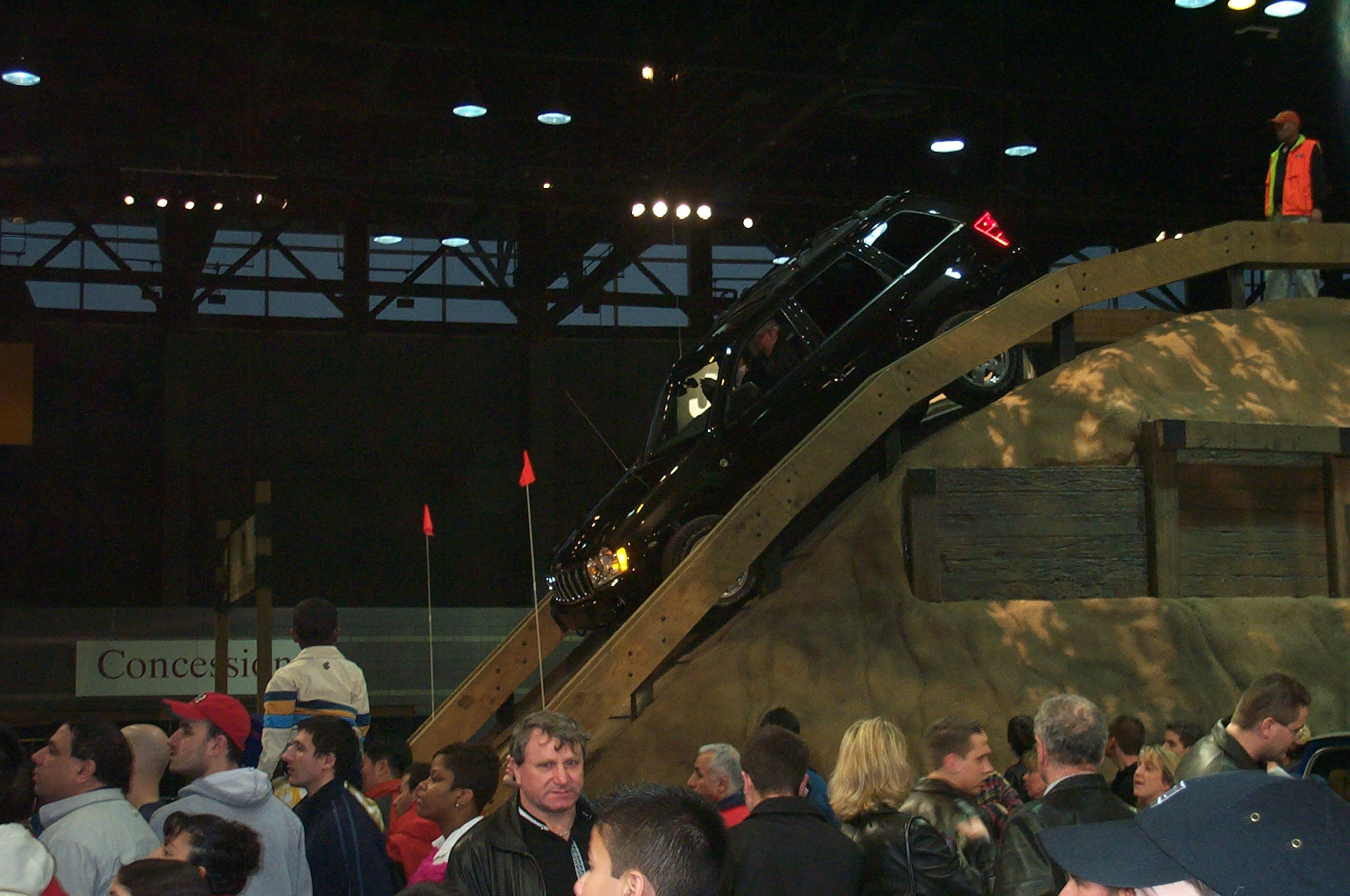
The Jeep testdrive "hill" at the 2005 Chicago Auto Show.

=== Production car introductions ===
- 2006 Buick Lucerne
- 2006 Cadillac DTS
- 2006 Dodge Ram Mega Cab
- 2006 Hummer H3
- 2006 Kia Sedona
- 2006 Mercedes-Benz S65 AMG
- 2006 Mercury Milan
- 2006 Mercury Mountaineer
- 2006 Mercury Mariner Hybrid
- 2006 Suzuki Grand Vitara
- 2007 Toyota FJ Cruiser

=== Concept car introductions ===
- Dodge Nitro (concept)
- Honda Civic Si coupe (pre-production concept)
- Hyundai Portico

== 2004 ==
The 2004 Chicago Auto Show was held from February 6 through February 15.

- 2005 Chevrolet Cobalt Sedan
- 2005 Chevrolet Corvette C6 Convertible
- 2005 Chevrolet Uplander
- 2005 Dodge Dakota
- 2005 Ford Freestyle
- 2005 GMC Envoy XL
- 2005 Hyundai Tucson
- 2005 Nissan Altima Facelift
- 2005 Nissan Frontier Crew Cab
- 2005 Subaru Outback
- 2005 Toyota Tacoma
- 2005 Toyota Highlander Hybrid

== 2003 ==
The 2003 Chicago Auto Show was held from February 14 through February 23.

Introductions:

- 2004 Chevrolet Aveo
- 2004 Ford Freestar
- 2004 Mercury Monterey
- 2004 Suzuki Forenza
- 2004 Suzuki Verona

== 2002 ==
The 2002 Chicago Auto Show was held from February 8 through February 17.

Introductions:

- 2003 Kia Sorento
- 2003 Mercury Marauder

== 2001 ==
Introductions:

- 2002 Nissan Xterra
- 2002 Subaru Impreza Outback Sport
- Hyundai HCD6 Roadster Concept Car
- Toyota RSC concept

== 1998 ==
=== Production car introductions ===
- Acura 3.5 RL Special Edition
- Acura Integra Type-R SCCA Race Car
- Acura NSX SCCA Race Car
- Cadillac Seville
- Chevrolet Corvette Convertible
- Chevrolet Tahoe Z71
- Chevrolet TrailBlazer
- Chrysler Town & Country Limited
- Dodge Viper GTS-R GT2 Championship Edition
- Jeep Grand Cherokee 5.9 Limited
- Jeep Cherokee Classic
- Mitsubishi Galant
- Nissan Quest
- Kia Sportage Convertible
- Ford SVT F-150 Lightning
- Ford F-150 NASCAR Special Edition
- Ford SVT Mustang Cobra Bondurant
- Ford Ranger XLT 4x4 Supercab
- Toyota Corolla Sedan
- Toyota Land Cruiser
- Toyota Tacoma Xtracab
- Subaru Legacy 2.5GT Limited

=== Concept car introductions ===
- Pontiac Grand Prix Concept:Cure by Cynthia Rowley
- Cadillac DeVille Concours Concept:Cure by Michael Kors
- Chevrolet Venture Concept:Cure by Joe Boxer's Nicholas Graham
- GMC Jimmy Concept:Cure by Tommy Hilfiger
- GMC Sierra DEUCE
- Ford Libre
- Nissan Frontier 4-door Concept
- Infiniti Q29 Roadster
- Kia Minivan Concept
- Toyota T150 Concept

== 1997 ==
=== Production car introductions ===
- 1998 Chevrolet Camaro (refresh)
- 1998 Dodge Dakota R/T
- 1998 Dodge Ram Quad Cab
- 1998 Ford Ranger
- 1998 Ford SVT Contour
- 1998 GMC Envoy
- 1998 Subaru Legacy Outback Limited (dual moonroof)

=== Concept car introductions ===
- Dodge Sidewinder
- Ford Powerforce
- Range Rover Autobiography concept
- Lexus SLV
- Mercedes-Benz F200 (North American debut)
- Mitsubishi Eclipse Spyder Speedster concept
- Toyota Solara concept

== 1995 ==
- Buick XP2000

== 1992 ==
More than 1,000 vehicles were on display, from the automotive manufacturers and other groups.

=== Production car introductions ===
- Audi 90
- Buick Skylark Sedan
- Ford Escort GT
- Ford SVT Mustang Cobra
- Ford SVT F-150 Lightning
- Infiniti J30
- Mazda 626
- Mercury Tracer
- Subaru Legacy Touring Sports LE Wagon
- Toyota Camry Wagon

=== Concept car introductions ===
- Geo Tracker concepts (Back Packer, Beach Low-Rider, Baja Race, Biker, Snow)
- Ford Explorer Drifter
- Ford Boss Bronco
- Saab 9000CD Turbo Flex Fuel Concept
- Toyota Avalon 4-door convertible concept

== 1991 ==
- GMC Rio Grande All-Wheel-Drive Concept

== 1990 ==
=== Production car introductions ===
- Vector W8

=== Concept cars ===
- Cadillac Aurora
- Dodge Daytona R/T concept
- Dodge Viper RT/10 concept
- Eagle Optima
- Geo "California Concept" Storm
- GMC Mahalo
- Geo Tracker "Hugger"
- GMC Transcend
- Plymouth Voyager III
- Subaru SRD-1
- Subaru SV/X concept

== 1989 ==
=== Production car introductions ===
- Mazda MX-5 Miata (NA)
- Nissan 300ZX (Z32)

=== Concept car introductions ===
- GMC Syclone concept
- Acura NS-X

== 1968 ==
=== Production car introductions ===
- AMC AMX

== 1923 ==
=== Production car introductions ===
- Crossland Steam Car
