= Colonial Hotel =

Colonial Hotel may refer to:

- Colonial Hotel (Excelsior Springs, Missouri), listed on the National Register of Historic Places (NRHP) in Clay County, Missouri
- Colonial Hotel (Wise, Virginia), listed on the NRHP in Wise County, Virginia
- Colonial Hotel (Seattle, Washington), listed on the NRHP in King County, Washington

== See also ==
- Colonial Inn (disambiguation)
