= Colonial Theatre (Hagerstown, Maryland) =

- U.S. National Register of Historic Places
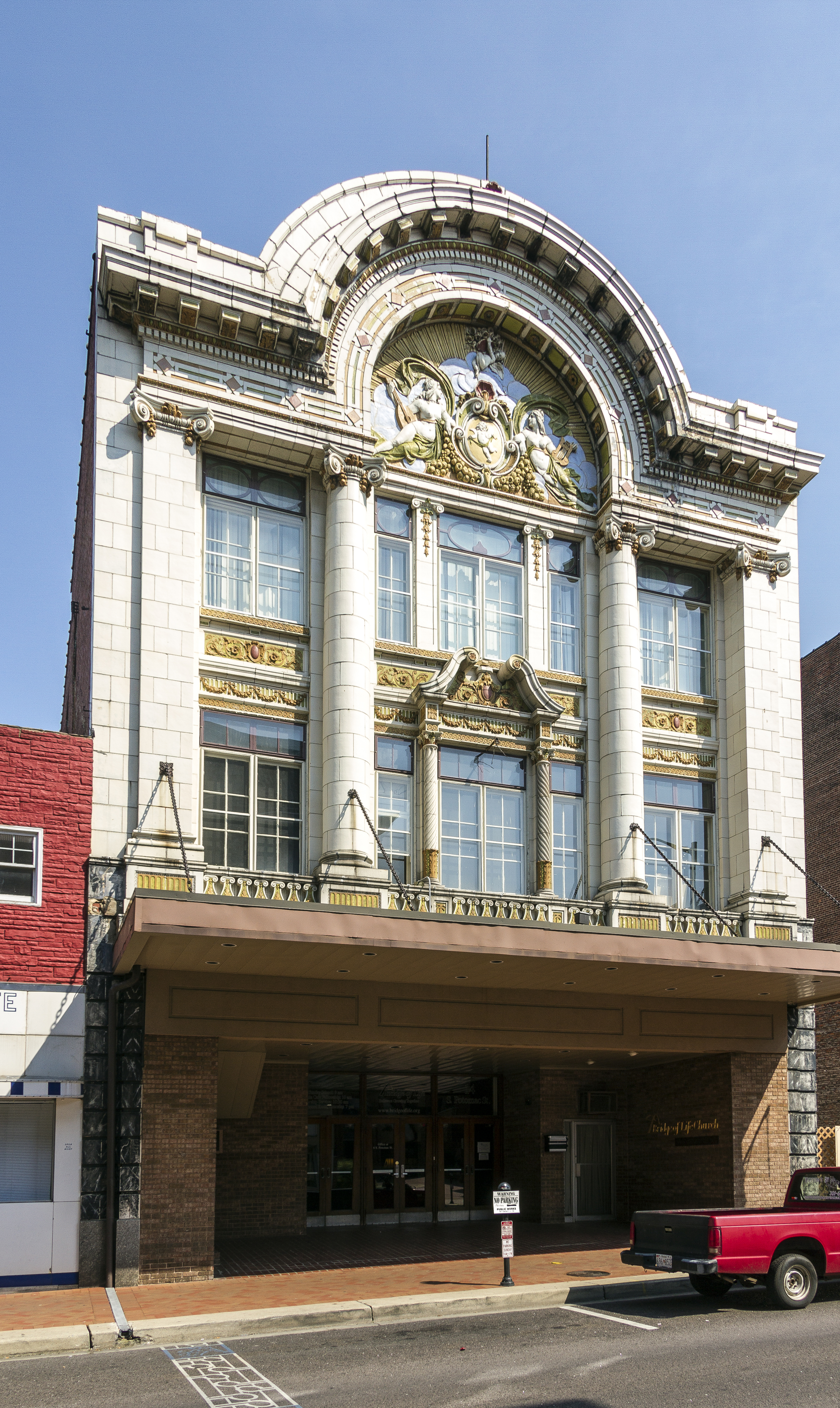

- Location within Maryland Location within the United States
- Location: 12--14 S. Potomac St., Hagerstown, Maryland
- Coordinates: 39°38′28″N 77°43′13″W
- Area: less than one acre
- Built: 1914
- Architect: Yessler, Harry E.
- Architectural style: Baroque
- NRHP reference No.: 78001478
- Added to NRHP: August 2, 1978

Colonial Theatre is a historic theater located at 12-14 S. Potomac Street in Hagerstown, Washington County, Maryland, United States. It is a 1914 commercial structure designed by Harry E. Yessler, a Hagerstown architect. It is three stories high, with a heavily ornamented, Baroque influenced terra cotta façade, created by terra cotta artist Henri Plasschaert.

The terra cotta frieze was carved by the artist Henry Plasschaert (1861–1940), a sculptor from Ghent, Belgium who emigrated to the United States in 1881. He was a very talented and highly regarded sculptor who resided primarily in the Philadelphia area. He taught modeling at UPenn from 1892 to 1897, was the head of the Decorative Sculpture Department run at the school by the Philadelphia Museum of Art during that same time. He was also listed as a professor of sculpture at the Pennsylvania Museum of Arts and School of Industrial Arts in 1894. Later in life he worked for the Boston Terra Cotta Company and then for Stephen, Leach and Conklin Company of Philadelphia.

His work is known throughout the Northeast, including the UPenn gargoyles which are vivid, including an animal biting the stone, mythical creatures, and even a monkey holding a diploma, the Barnum Museum in Bridgeport, CT, various banks, community buildings, and even a vaudeville venue, the Colonial Theater in Hagerstown, MD, which he signed his work. According to members of the NYC-based Friends of Terra Cotta Society, he is the only terra cotta artists that is known to have signed his work on the facade of a NYC building, which was the German American Shooting Club building in the St. Mark's district of NY.

A large marquee bearing the name of the original theater projects over the sidewalk. The upper levels of the façade are constructed of glazed white blocks with gold decorative detailing, in a Palladian window shape, flanked by flat Ionic pilasters. The theatre showed films until 1973, and is now owned by a church.

It was listed on the National Register of Historic Places in 1978.
