= Plymouth Voyager 3 =

Chrysler concept car of 1989

1989 Plymouth Voyager 3 concept vehicle

1989 Plymouth Voyager 3 with detached cab

The Plymouth Voyager 3 was a minivan concept car revealed by Plymouth in 1989. Part of the car's aerodynamic design featured a glass roof. One thing that was unique about this car was that in a sense it was a miniature tractor-trailer; the cab separated from the back of the car and could be driven by itself. The rear wheels of the cab were hidden (notice on image) when it was all in one piece.

Each segment of the vehicle contains its own four-cylinder engine, which are electronically-coordinated to deliver power independently or in concert.

The Voyager 3 was credited to Chrysler Designer Tom Gale (who also penned the Dodge Viper and Plymouth Prowler) by one source that also called it "the worst concept car of all time".

This concept car debuted at the 1990 Chicago Auto Show walkaround video in 1990.
