= Colonials (synchronized skating team) =

The Colonials is a synchronized ice skating team from West Acton, Massachusetts. The Colonial's junior team received second place at the junior world qualifier in 2007, allowing the team to be a part of the world junior team.
