= Weidely Motors Company =

Early motor company based in Indianapolis, IN

- Industry: Automotive
- Founded: 1914; 112 years ago
- Founder: George Weidely and H.O. Smith
- Headquarters: Indianapolis, IN, United States

The Weidely Motors Company was an early automobile company based in Indianapolis, IN. Weidely started in 1915. It made engines for Premier, Chalmers, Cletrac crawlers and Owen Magnetic cars. They also made a V-12 engine for the 1917 Pathfinder and 1920 Heine-Velox, as well as the 1916-1918 Austin, Hal and Kissel cars.

George Weidely and H.O. Smith, started the Premier Motor Manufacturing Company on December 24, 1902. Weidely was an innovative engine designer and created an early overhead valve V-12. Premier went into receivership in 1914 so they took the rights and development of the Premier engine and formed the Weidely Engine Company in partnership with R.M. Owen who was president of the Entz Motor Corporation. Research has not revealed when the company closed but it made engines for Cletrac up to 1932.

When comparing later OHC Chalmers power plants to the T head or L head engines of the pre-World War I period, their specifications cannot be ignored. The Chalmers' two-roller-bearing-crankshaft F-head engine of 1910 had been a surprising performer, with a streamlined intake manifold feeding the cylinders via extremely large intake valves located in the head. The exhaust side valves were in a pocket, leaving a lot of room in the cylinder head for the inlets.

In 1915, Chalmers made a great step forward with the incorporation of a full-overhead-camshaft Weidley engine, which pioneered the idea of driving the overhead-camshaft from the middle of the crankshaft instead of from the front or the rear. The model 6-40 had a bore and stroke of 3.125 and 5 inches, respectively, and camshaft rigidity was obtained by using a 2.25-inch diameter. The location of the camshaft drive in the center made it necessary to have four main bearings instead of the usual three. Tubular connecting rods were also used, which was a very advanced idea for its day.

Weidely produced a three main bearing pushrod ohv six that powered the Auburn 6-63 models of 1923 and 1924. Unlike most pushrod designs of the day its valvetrain was fully enclosed.
