= United States home front during World War I =

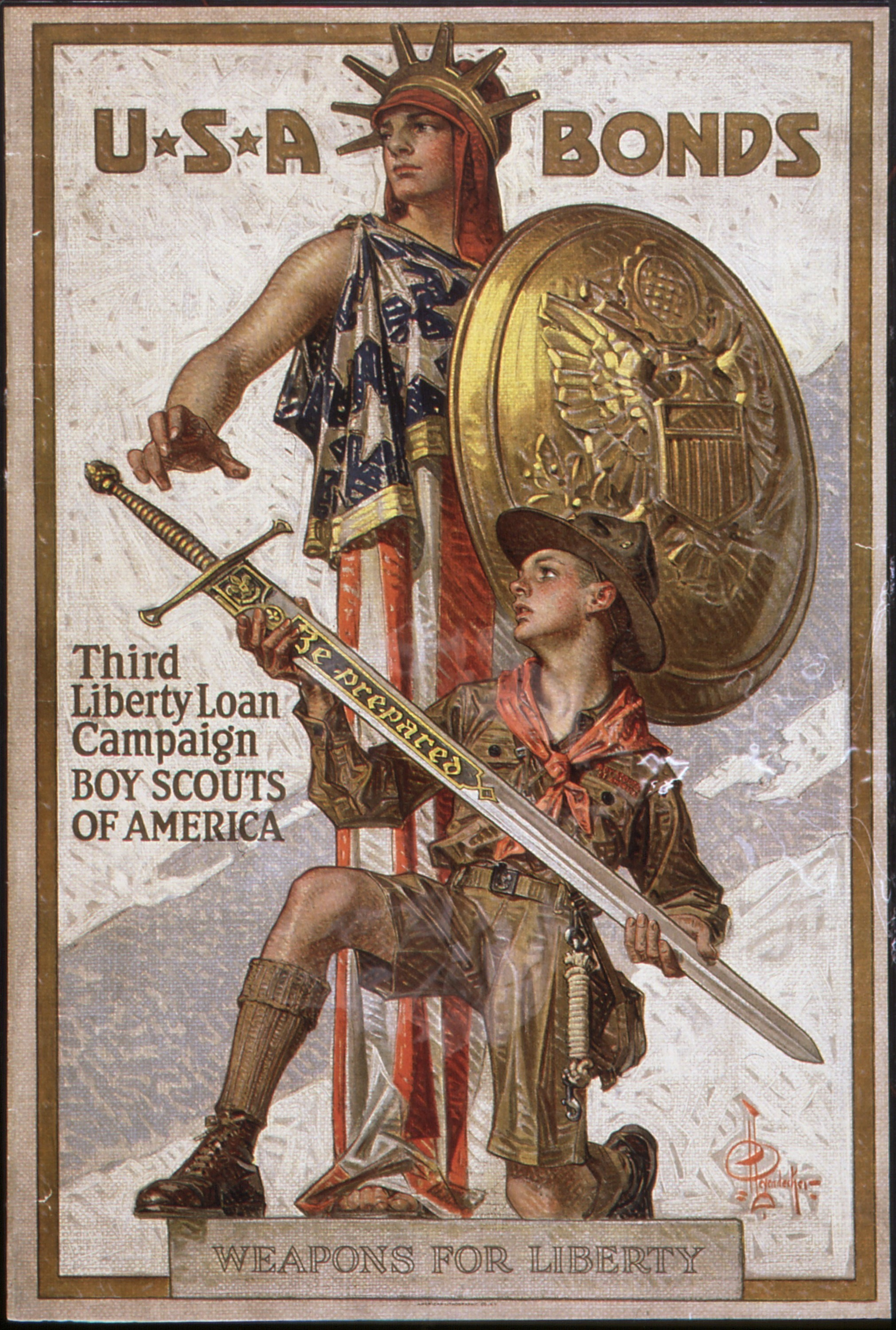
Weapons for Liberty – U.S.A. Bonds, Liberty bond poster by J. C. Leyendecker (1918)

During World War I, the United States saw a systematic mobilization of the country's entire population and economy to produce the soldiers, food supplies, ammunitions and money necessary to win the war. Although the United States entered the war in April 1917, there had been very little planning, or even recognition of the problems that Great Britain and the other Allies had to solve on their own home fronts. As a result, the level of confusion was high in the first 12 months.

The war came in the midst of the Progressive Era, when efficiency and expertise were highly valued. Therefore, both individual states and the federal government established a multitude of temporary agencies to bring together the expertise necessary to redirect the economy and society into the production of munitions and food needed for the war, as well as the circulation of beliefs and ideals in order to motivate the people.

== American entry into the war ==
Firmly maintaining neutrality when World War I began in Europe in 1914, the United States helped supply the Allies, but could not ship anything to Germany because of the British blockade. Sympathies among many politically and culturally influential Americans had favored the British cause from the start of the war, as typified by industrialist Samuel Insull, born in London, who helped young Americans enlist in British or Canadian forces. On the other hand, especially in the Midwest, many Irish Americans and German Americans opposed any American involvement and were anti-British. The suffragist movement included many pacifists, and most churches opposed the war.

German efforts to use its U-boats to blockade Britain resulted in the deaths of American travelers and sailors, and attacks on passenger liners caused public outrage. Most notable was the torpedoing without warning the passenger liner Lusitania in 1915. Germany promised not to repeat, but it reversed its position in early 1917, believing that unrestricted U-boat warfare against all ships headed to Britain would win the war even at the cost of American entry. Americans public opinion was inflamed by the German offer to Mexico, in the Zimmermann telegram: an invitation for Mexico to go to war with Germany against the United States, with German funding, with the promise of the return of the lost territories of Arizona, New Mexico, and Texas. On April 1, 1917, Wilson called for war, emphasizing that the U.S. had to fight to maintain its honor and to have a decisive voice in shaping the new postwar world. Congress voted on April 6, 1917, to declare war, 82 to 6 in the Senate, and 373 to 50 in the House of Representatives.

== US government ==
=== Temporary agencies ===
Congress authorized President Woodrow Wilson to create a bureaucracy of 500,000 to 1 million new jobs in five thousand new federal agencies. To solve the labor crisis, the Employment Service of the Department of Labor attracted workers from the South and Midwest to war industries in the East.

=== Government propaganda ===
In April 1917, the Wilson Administration created the Committee on Public Information (CPI), known as the Creel Committee, to control war information and provide pro-war propaganda. Employing talented writers and scholars, it issued anti-German pamphlets and films. It organized thousands of "Four-Minute Men" to deliver brief speeches at movie theaters, schools and churches to promote patriotism and participation in the war effort.

== Military draft ==
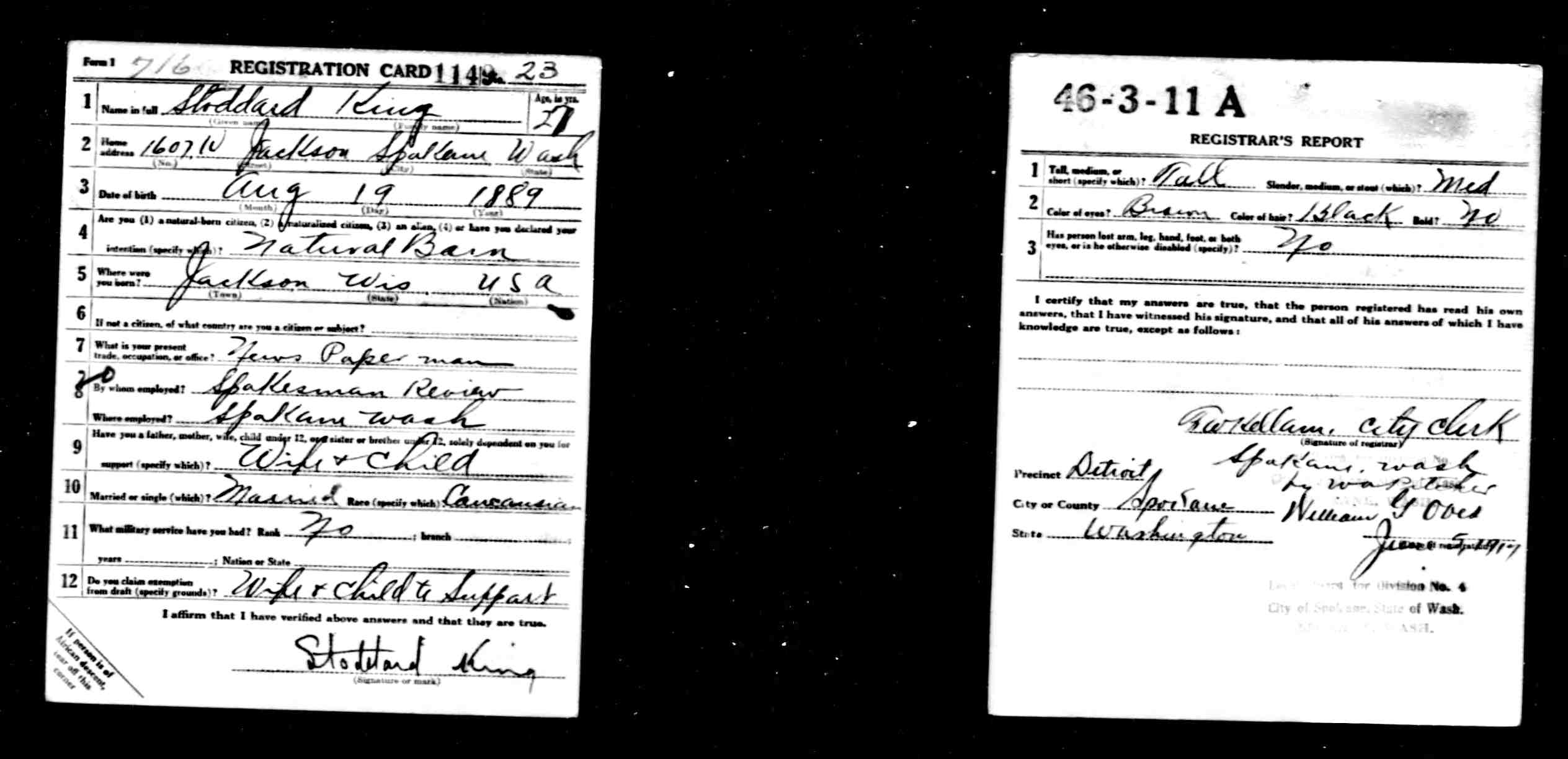
A World War I era draft card.

In 1917 the administration decided to rely primarily on conscription, rather than voluntary enlistment, to raise military manpower for World War I. The Selective Service Act of 1917 was carefully drawn to remedy the defects in the Civil War system and—by allowing exemptions for dependency, essential occupations, and religious scruples—to place each man in his proper niche in a national war effort. The act established a "liability for military service of all male citizens"; authorized a selective draft of all those between twenty-one and thirty-one years of age (later from eighteen to forty-five); and prohibited all forms of bounties, substitutions, or purchase of exemptions. Administration was entrusted to local boards composed of leading civilians in each community. These boards issued draft calls in order of numbers drawn in a national lottery and determined exemptions. In 1917 and 1918 some 24 million men were registered and nearly 3 million inducted into the military services, with little of the resistance that characterized the Civil War.

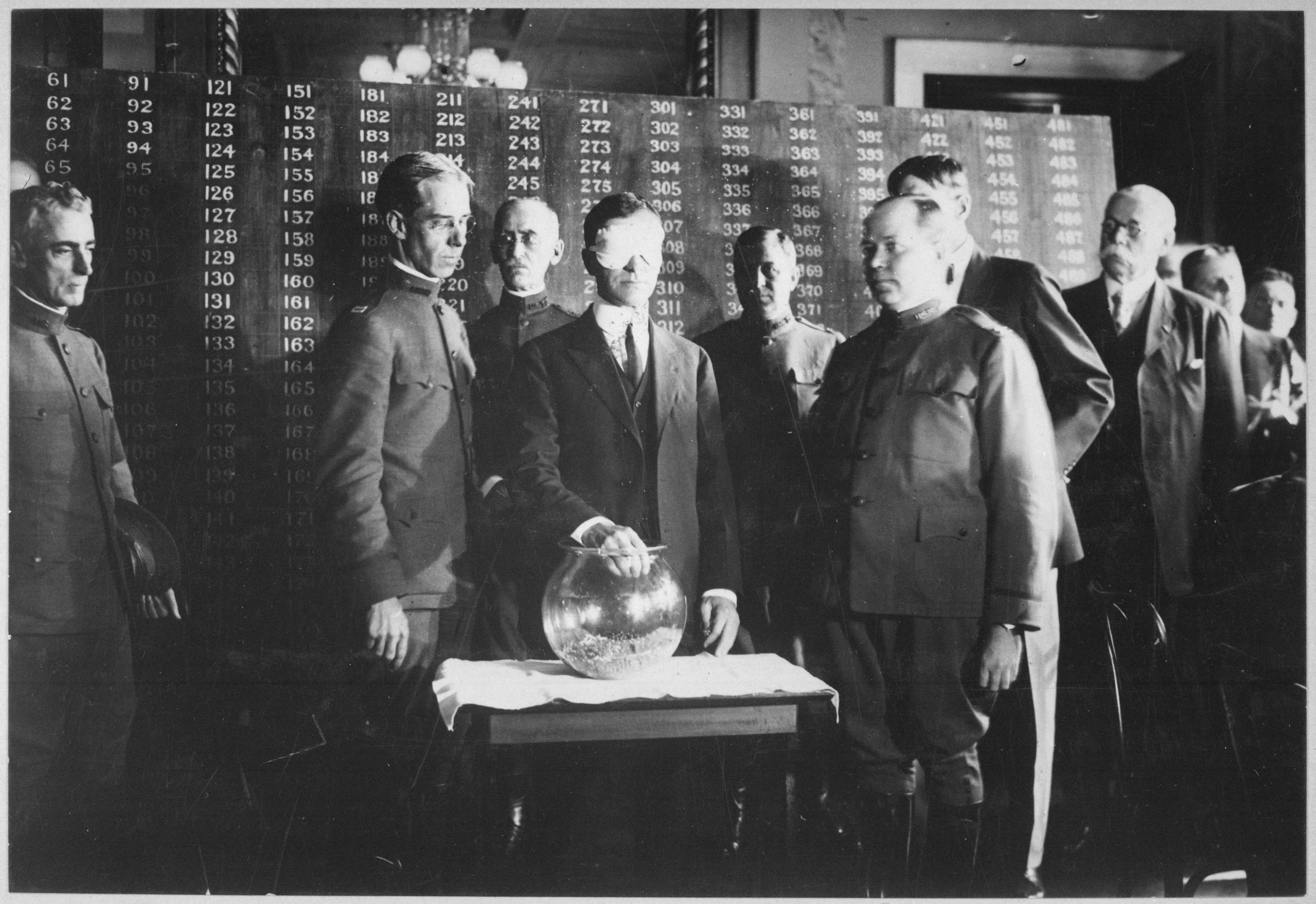
Secretary of War Newton Baker draws the first draft number on 20 July 1917.

Using questionnaires filled out by doughboys as they left the Army, Gutièrrez reports that they were not cynical or disillusioned. They fought "for honor, manhood, comrades, and adventure, but especially for duty."

== Civil liberties ==
The Espionage Act of 1917 and the Sedition Act of 1918 attempted to punish enemy activity and extended to the punishment expressions of doubt about America's role in the war. The Sedition Act criminalized any expression of opinion that used "disloyal, profane, scurrilous or abusive language" about the U.S. government, flag or armed forces. Government police action, private vigilante groups, and public war hysteria compromised the civil liberties of many Americans who disagreed with Wilson's policies.

The private American Protective League, working with the Federal Bureau of Investigation, was one of many private patriotic associations that sprang up to support the war and at the same time identify slackers, spies, draft dodgers and anti-war organizations.

In a July 1917 speech, Max Eastman complained that the government's aggressive prosecutions of dissent meant that "You can't even collect your thoughts without getting arrested for unlawful assemblage."

== Motion pictures ==
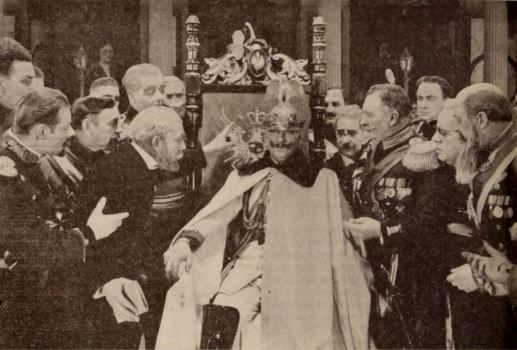
Still from the American propaganda war film The Kaiser, the Beast of Berlin (1918) with Rupert Julian as the Kaiser.

The young film industry produced a wide variety of propaganda films. The most successful was The Kaiser, the Beast of Berlin, a "sensational creation" designed to rouse the audience against the German ruler. Comedies included Mutt and Jeff at the Front. The greatest artistic success, considered by many a landmark of film history, was Charlie Chaplin's Shoulder Arms, which followed the star from his induction into the military, his accidental penetration of the German lines, and his eventual return having captured the Kaiser and Crown Prince and won himself a pretty French girl. Other activities included film shorts supporting the sale of war bonds or for war relief such as Tom's Little Star.

Documentary on the official American film cameramen in World War I

Once America entered the war in 1917 Hollywood filmmakers had no more use for popular prewar ideological themes of neutrality, cynicism or pacifism. At first they focused their attention on making heroes out of Wilson and Pershing. Soon they turned the cameras toward portrayals of average Americans facing typical situations; this approach resonated better with audiences. The films attacked cowards, and snooty elites who disdained any dangerous combat roles in a war to purify the world. They reinforced American democracy and attacked hierarchical class structures. By the 1920s and 1930s, however, the mood had reversed and pacifism was shown as the antidote to the horrors of the World War. The smash hit Marx brothers comedy Duck Soup made it clear that stupidity caused the war. The cycle turned around once again by 1941, when Gary Cooper emerged from a religious pacifism to a militant heroism in Sergeant York. Single-handedly he used his backwoods hunting skills to capture an entire unit of the highly professional German army.

== Economics ==
=== Munitions production before U.S. entry ===
By 1916, Britain was funding most of the Empire's war expenditures, all of Italy's and two thirds of the war costs of France and Russia, plus smaller nations as well. The gold reserves, overseas investments and private credit then ran out, forcing Britain to borrow $4 billion from the U.S. Treasury in 1917–18. Much of this money was spent paying United States industries to manufacture ammunition. United States Cartridge Company expanded its work force ten-fold in response to September 1914 contracts with British purchasing agents; and ultimately manufactured over two billion rifle and machine gun cartridges. Baldwin Locomotive Works expanded their Eddystone, Pennsylvania, manufacturing facilities in 1915 to manufacture Russian artillery shells and British rifles. The United States production of smokeless powder was equal to the combined production of the European Allies during the last 19 months of the war; and by the end of the war United States factories were producing smokeless powder at a rate 45 percent higher than the European Allies' combined production. Production rate of explosives by the United States was similarly 40 percent higher than Britain and nearly twice that of France. Shipments of American raw materials and food allowed Britain to feed itself and its army while maintaining her productivity. The financing was generally successful. Heavy investment in ammunition manufacturing machinery did not bring long term prosperity to some major American companies. The United States Cartridge Company Lowell, Massachusetts, factory which manufactured nearly two-thirds of the small arms cartridges produced in the United States during the war, closed eight years later. After Baldwin manufactured over six million artillery shells, nearly two million rifles, and 5,551 military locomotives for Russia, France, Britain and the United States, postwar production never used more than one-third the capacity of the Eddystone factory; and Baldwin declared bankruptcy in 1935.

=== Munitions production after U.S. entry ===
The US effort to produce and ship war material to France was characterized by several factors. The US declared war on Germany on 6 April 1917 with only a small munitions industry, very few medium and heavy artillery pieces, and few machine guns. By June 1917 the US had decided that their forces would primarily operate alongside the French, and would acquire their artillery and machine guns by purchasing mostly French weapons in theater, along with some British weapons in the case of heavy artillery. Shipments from the US to France would primarily be of soldiers and ammunition; artillery equipment in particular occupied too much space and weight to be economical. These priorities combined with the short 19-month US participation in the war meant that few US-made weapons arrived in France, and the need for extensive training of artillery units once in France meant that fewer still saw action before the Armistice. A comparison with World War II would be that the US started preparing for that war in earnest shortly after the Germans invaded Poland in September 1939; by the time the US entered the war following the attack on Pearl Harbor in December 1941 there had already been 27 months of mobilization.

Artillery

It was envisioned that US artillery production of French- and British-designed weapons, and a few US-designed weapons chambered for French ammunition, would be ramped up and that US-made artillery would eventually be delivered to the battlefields in quantity. However, major production snarls occurred with most of the artillery programs, and as mentioned artillery shipments had a lower priority than many other types of shipments overseas.

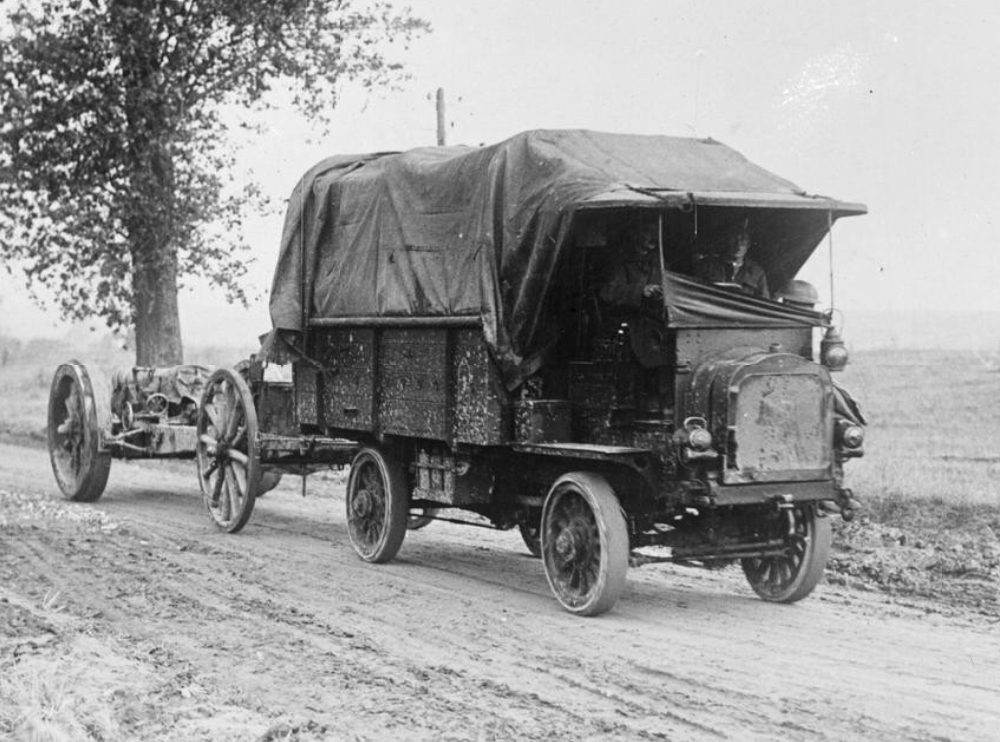
FWD 'Model B', 3-ton, 4x4 truck

=== Motor vehicles ===
Before U.S. entry in WW I, many American-made heavy four-wheel drive trucks, notably made by Four Wheel Drive (4WD) Auto Company, and Jeffery / Nash Quads, were already serving in foreign militaries, bought by Great Britain, France and Russia. When WW I started, motor vehicles had begun to replace horses and pulled wagons, but on the European muddy roads and battlefields, two-wheel drive trucks got stuck all the time, and the leading allied countries could not produce 4WD trucks in the numbers they needed. The U.S. Army wanted to replace four-mule teams used for hauling standard 1 1/2 U.S. ton (3000 lb / 1.36 metric ton) loads with trucks, and requested proposals from companies in late 1912. This led the Thomas B. Jeffery Company to develop a competent four-wheel drive, 1 1/2 short ton capacity truck by July 1913: the "Quad".

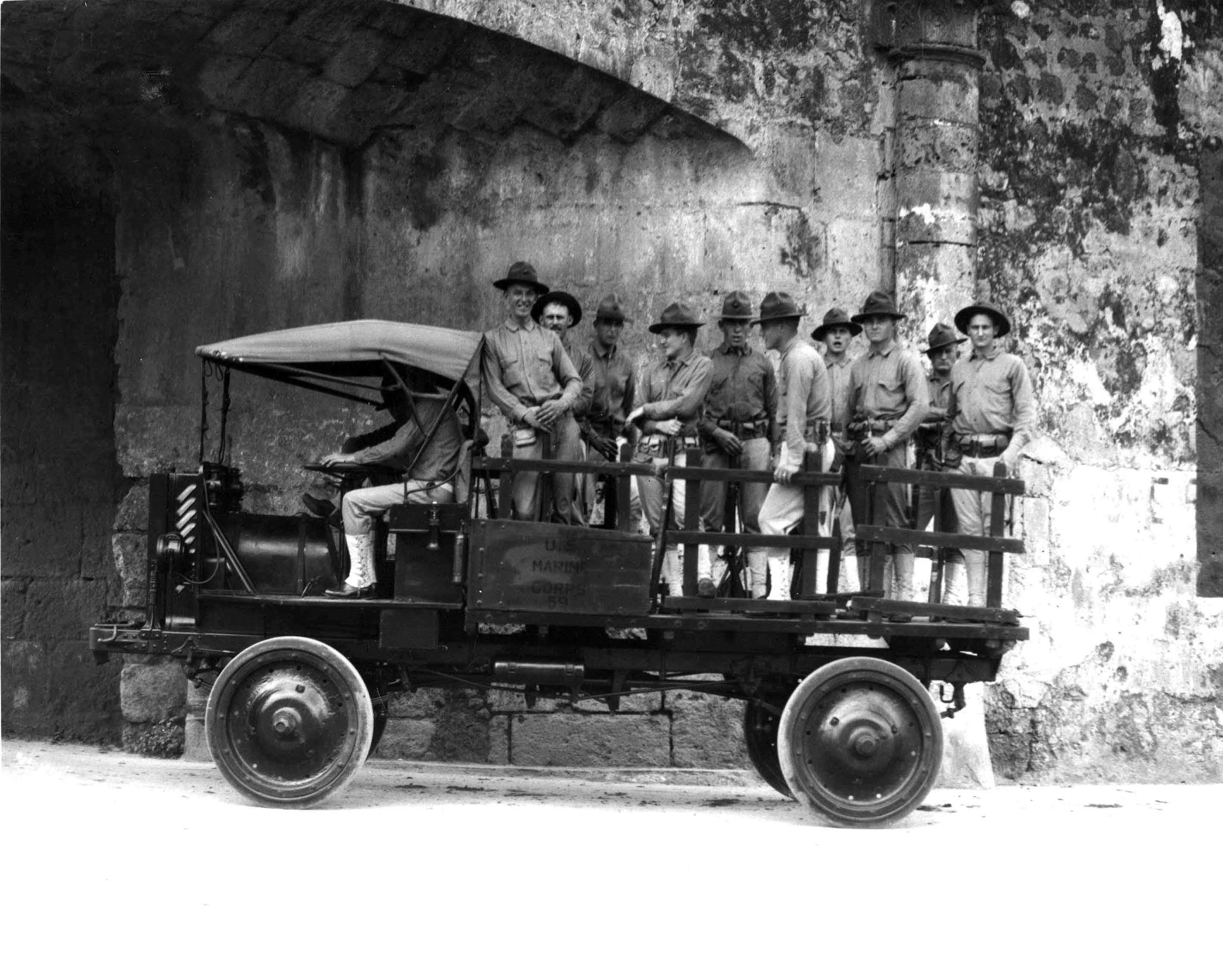
U.S. Marines riding in a Jeffery Quad, Fort Santo Domingo, c. 1916

The Jeffery Quad, and from the company's take-over by Nash Motors after 1916, the Nash Quad truck, greatly assisted the World War I efforts of several Allied nations, particularly the French. The United States Marine Corps first adopted Quads in anger in the U.S. occupation of Haiti, and of the Dominican Republic, from 1915 through 1917. The U.S. Army's first heavy usage of Quads was under general John "Blackjack" Pershing in the 1916 Pancho Villa Expedition in Mexico — both as regular transport trucks, and in the form of the Jeffery armored car. Once the U.S. entered World War I, Nash Quads were used heavily in Pershing's subsequent campaigns in Europe, and they became the workhorse of the Allied Expeditionary Force there. Some 11,500 Jeffery or Nash Quads were built between 1913 and 1919.

Luella Bates driving a Model B, FWD truck – promotional photo.

The success of the Four Wheel Drive cars in early military tests had prompted the company to switch from cars to truck manufacturing. In 1916 the U.S. Army ordered 147 FWD Model B, three-ton (6000 lb / 2700 kg) capacity trucks for the Mexico border Expedition, and subsequently ordered an amount of 15,000 FWD Model B 3-ton trucks as the "Truck, 3 ton, Model 1917" during World War I, with over 14,000 actually delivered. Additional orders came from the United Kingdom and Russia. Once the FWD and Jeffery / Nash four-wheel drive trucks were required in large numbers in World War I, both models were built under license by several additional companies to meet demand. The FWD Model B was produced under license by four additional manufacturers.

The Quad and the FWD trucks were made in five-figure numbers, and they incorporated technological innovations, that enabled the decisive U.S. and Allied usage of 4x4 and 6x6 trucks in World War II. The Quad's production continued for 15 years with a total of 41,674 units made.

Socially, it was the FWD company that employed Luella Bates, believed to be the first female truck driver, chosen to work as test and demonstration driver for FWD, from 1918 to 1922. During World War I, she was a test driver traveling throughout the state of Wisconsin in an FWD Model B truck. After the war, when the majority of the women working at Four Wheel Drive were let go, she remained as a demonstrator and driver.

=== Farming and food ===
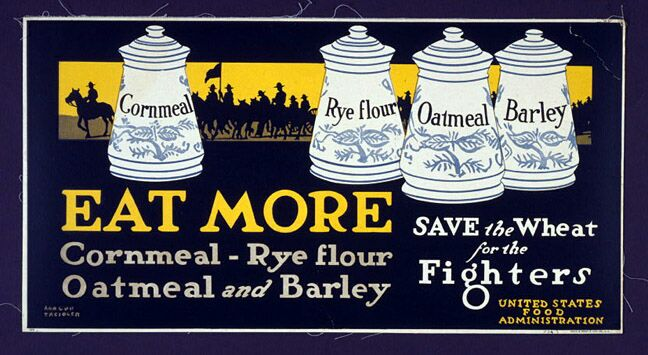
Food Administration poster 1917

The food program was a major success, as output expanded, waste was reduced, and both the home front and the Allies received more food. The U.S. Food Administration under Herbert Hoover launched a massive campaign to teach Americans to economize on their food budgets and grow victory gardens in their backyards. It managed the nation's food distribution and prices.

Gross farm income increased more than 230% from 1914 to 1919. Apart from "wheatless Wednesdays" and "meatless Tuesdays" due to poor harvests in 1916 and 1917, there were "fuelless Mondays" and "gasless Sundays" to preserve coal and gasoline.

=== Economic crisis in 1917 ===
In terms of munitions production, the first 15 months involved an amazing parade of mistakes and confusion. Washington was unable to figure out what to do when, or even to decide who was in charge. Typical of the confusion was the coal shortage that hit in December 1917. Because coal was by far the major source of energy and heat, a grave crisis ensued. There was in fact plenty of coal being mined, but 44,000 loaded freight and coal cars were tied up in horrendous traffic jams in the rail yards of the East Coast. Two hundred ships were waiting in New York Harbor for cargo that was delayed by the mess. The solution included nationalizing the coal mines and the railroads for the duration, shutting down factories one day a week to save fuel, and enforcing a strict system of priorities. Only in March 1918 did Washington finally take control of the crisis. Following the startup of the United States Railroad Administration in early 1918, the transportation system began to work smoothly.

=== Shipments to Europe ===
Shipbuilding became a major wartime industry, focused on merchant ships and tankers. Merchant ships were often sunk until the convoy system was adopted using British and Canadian naval escorts. Convoys were slow but effective in stopping u-boat attacks. The troops were shipped over on fast passenger liners that could easily outrun submarines.

An oil crisis occurred in Britain due to the 1917 German submarine campaign. Standard Oil of NJ, for example, lost 6 tankers (including the brand new "John D. Archbold") between May and September. The solution was expanded oil shipments from America in convoys. The Allies formed the Inter-Allied Petroleum Conference with USA, Britain, France, and Italy as the members. Standard and Royal Dutch/Shell ran it and made it work. The introduction of convoys as an antidote to the German U-boats and the joint management system by Standard Oil and Royal Dutch/Shell helped to solve the Allies' supply problems. The close working relationship that evolved was in marked contrast to the feud between the government and Standard Oil years earlier. In 1917 and 1918, there was increased domestic demand for oil partly due to the cold winter that created a shortage of coal. Inventories and imported oil from Mexico were used to close the gap. In January 1918, the U.S. Fuel Administrator ordered industrial plants east of Mississippi to close for a week to free up oil for Europe.

The coal shortage caused sharp increases in the demand and prices of oil and industry called for voluntary price control from the oil industry. While Standard Oil was agreeable, the independent oil companies were not. Demand continued to outpace supply because of the war and the growth in automobiles in America. An appeal for "Gasolineless Sundays" in US was made with exceptions for freight, doctors, police, emergency vehicles, and funeral cars.

=== Labor ===
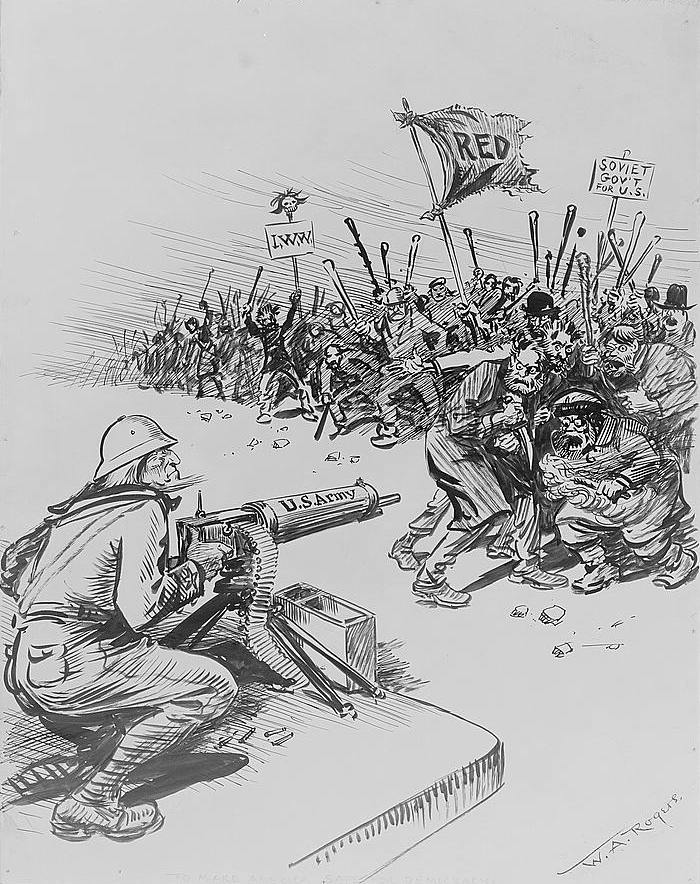
1919 New York Herald cartoon portraying "reds" and "Wobblies" (IWW members) as a violent mob held back by threat of a US Army machine gun

The American Federation of Labor (AFL) and affiliated trade unions were strong supporters of the war effort. Fear of disruptions to war production by labor radicals provided the AFL political leverage to gain recognition and mediation of labor disputes, often in favor of improvements for workers. They resisted strikes in favor of arbitration and wartime policy, and wages soared as near-full employment was reached at the height of the war. The AFL unions strongly encouraged young men to enlist in the military, and fiercely opposed efforts to reduce recruiting and slow war production by pacifists, the anti-war Industrial Workers of the World (IWW) and radical socialists. To keep factories running smoothly, Wilson established the National War Labor Board in 1918, which forced management to negotiate with existing unions. Wilson also appointed AFL president Samuel Gompers to the powerful Council of National Defense, where he set up the War Committee on Labor.

After initially resisting taking a stance, the IWW became actively anti-war, engaging in strikes and speeches and suffering both legal and illegal suppression by federal and local governments as well as pro-war vigilantes. The IWW was branded as anarchic, socialist, unpatriotic, alien and funded by German gold, and violent attacks on members and offices would continue into the 1920s.

The AFL membership soared to 2.4 million in 1917. In 1919, the AFL tried to make their gains permanent and called a series of major strikes in meat, steel and other industries. The strikes ultimately failed, forcing unions back to membership and power similar to those around 1910.

== Social history ==
=== African-Americans ===
With an enormous demand for expansion of the defense industries, the new draft law in effect, and the cut off of immigration from Europe, demand was very high for underemployed farmers from the South. Hundreds of thousands of African-Americans took the trains to Northern industrial centers. Migrants going to Pittsburgh and surrounding mill towns in western Pennsylvania between 1890 and 1930 faced racial discrimination and limited economic opportunities. The black population in Pittsburgh jumped from 6,000 in 1880 to 27,000 in 1910. Many took highly paid, skilled jobs in the steel mills. Pittsburgh's black population increased to 37,700 in 1920 (6.4% of the total) while the black element in Homestead, Rankin, Braddock, and others nearly doubled. They succeeded in building effective community responses that enabled the survival of new communities. Historian Joe Trotter explains the decision process:

Although African-Americans often expressed their views of the Great Migration in biblical terms and received encouragement from northern black newspapers, railroad companies, and industrial labor agents, they also drew upon family and friendship networks to help in the move to Western Pennsylvania. They formed migration clubs, pooled their money, bought tickets at reduced rates, and often moved ingroups. Before they made the decision to move, they gathered information and debated the pros and cons of the process....In barbershops, poolrooms, and grocery stores, in churches, lodge halls, and clubhouses, and in private homes, southern blacks discussed, debated, and decided what was good and what was bad about moving to the urban North.

After the war ended and the soldiers returned home, tensions were very high, with serious labor union strikes involving black strikebreakers and inter-racial riots in major cities. The summer of 1919 was the Red Summer with outbreaks of racial violence killing about 1,000 people across the nation, most of whom were black.

=== Women ===
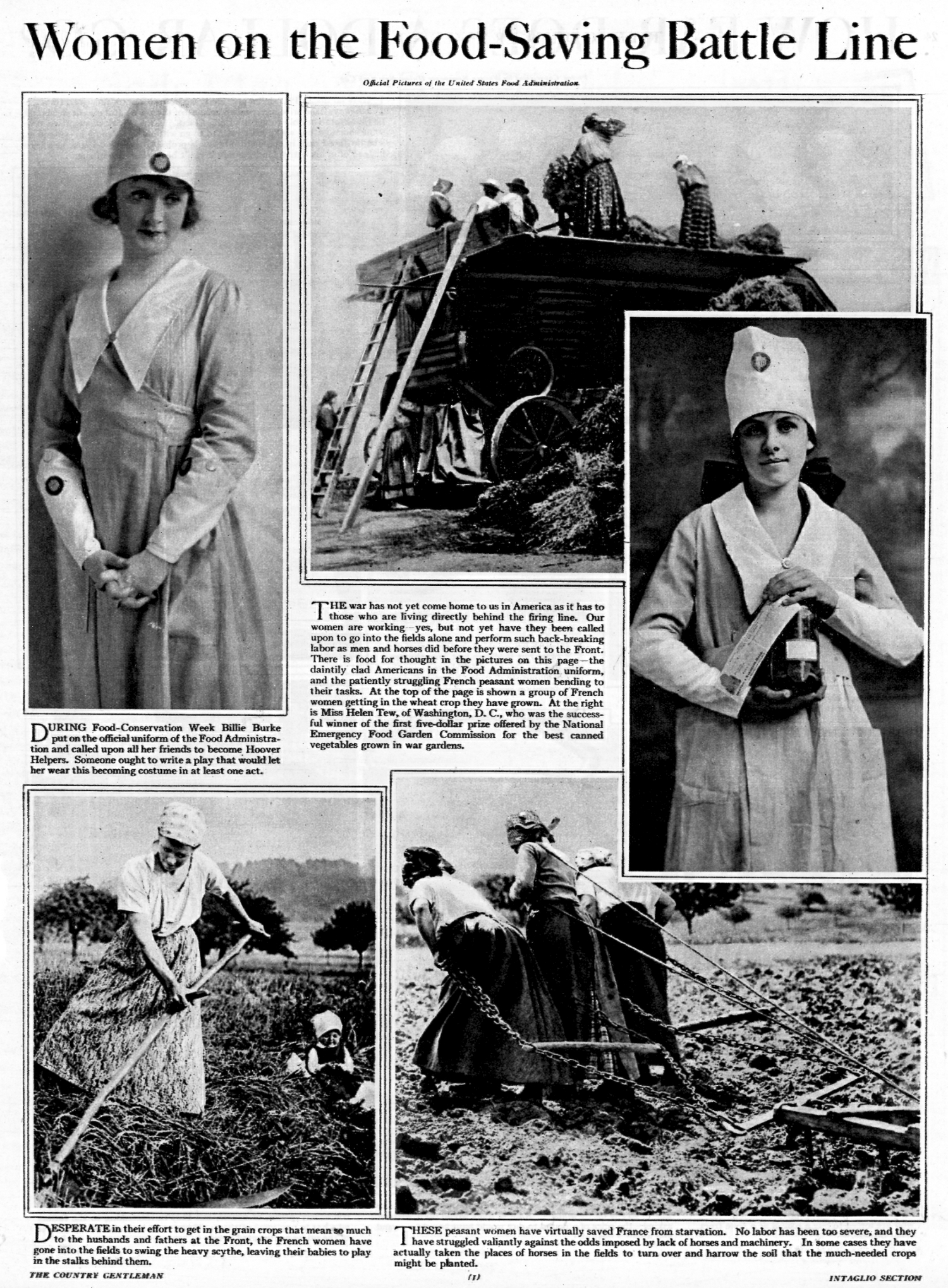
Women in America during, World War I, performing farm labor to address the food shortages.

During WWI (1914-1918), large numbers of women were recruited into jobs that had either been vacated by men who had gone to fight in the war, or had been created as part of the war effort. The high demand for weapons and the overall wartime situation resulted in munitions factories collectively becoming the largest employer of American women by 1918. While there was initial resistance to hiring women for jobs traditionally held by men, the war made the need for labor so urgent that women were hired in large numbers and the government even actively promoted the employment of women in war-related industries through recruitment drives. As a result, women not only began working in heavy industry, but also took other jobs traditionally reserved solely for men, such as railway guards, ticket collectors, bus and tram conductors, postal workers, police officers, firefighters, and clerks.

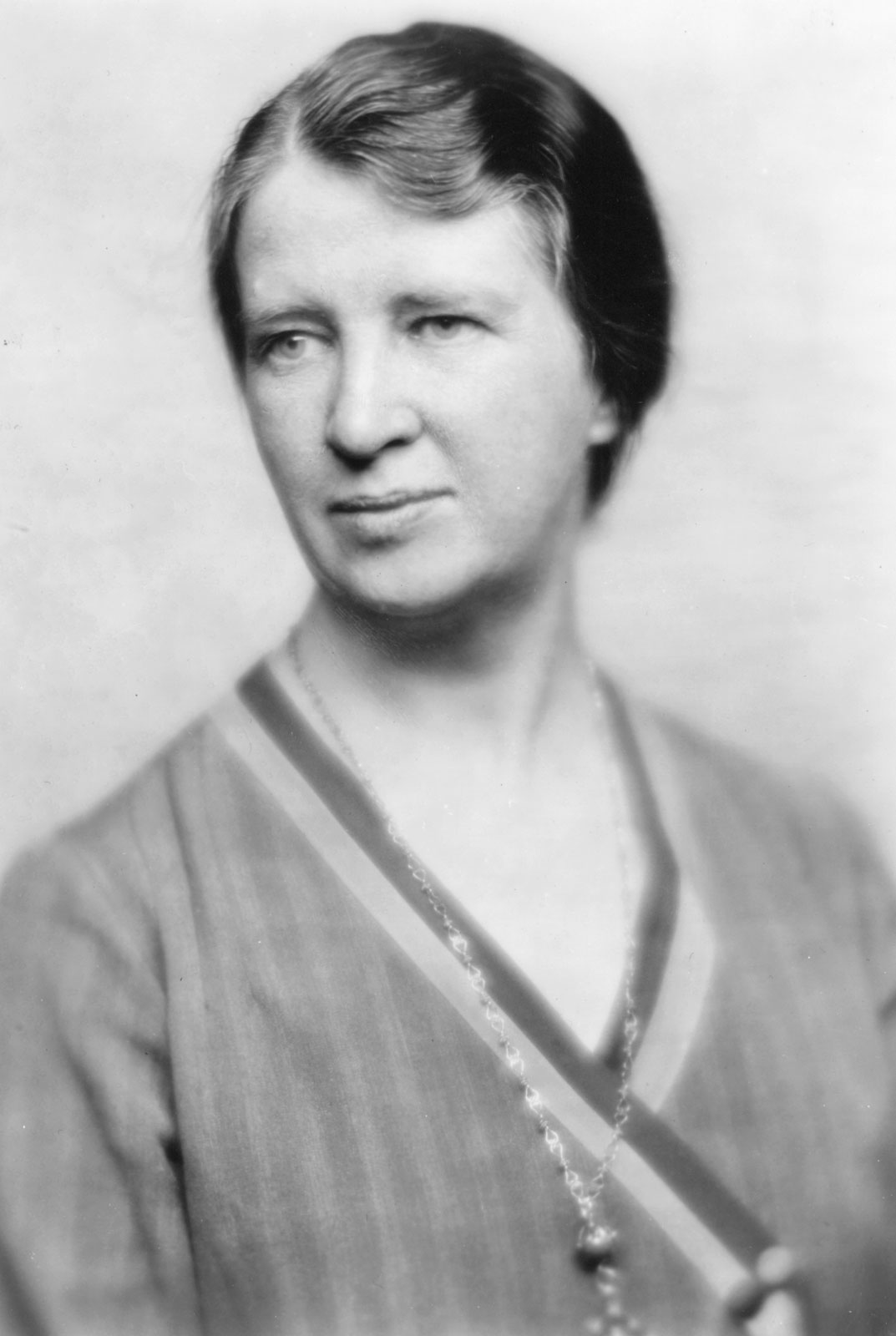
Mary Van Kleeck led the Department of Labor effort to set employment standards for working women during the war

World War I saw women taking traditionally men's jobs in large numbers for the first time in American history. Many women worked on the assembly lines of factories, producing trucks and munitions, while department stores employed African American women as elevator operators and cafeteria waitresses for the first time. The Food Administration helped housewives prepare more nutritious meals with less waste and with optimum use of the foods available. Most important, the morale of the women remained high, as millions joined the Red Cross as volunteers to help soldiers and their families, and with rare exceptions, the women did not protest the draft.

The Department of Labor created a Women in Industry group, headed by prominent labor researcher and social scientist Mary van Kleeck. This group helped develop standards for women who were working in industries connected to the war alongside the War Labor Policies Board, of which van Kleeck was also a member. After the war, the Women in Industry Service group developed into the U.S. Women's Bureau, headed by Mary Anderson.

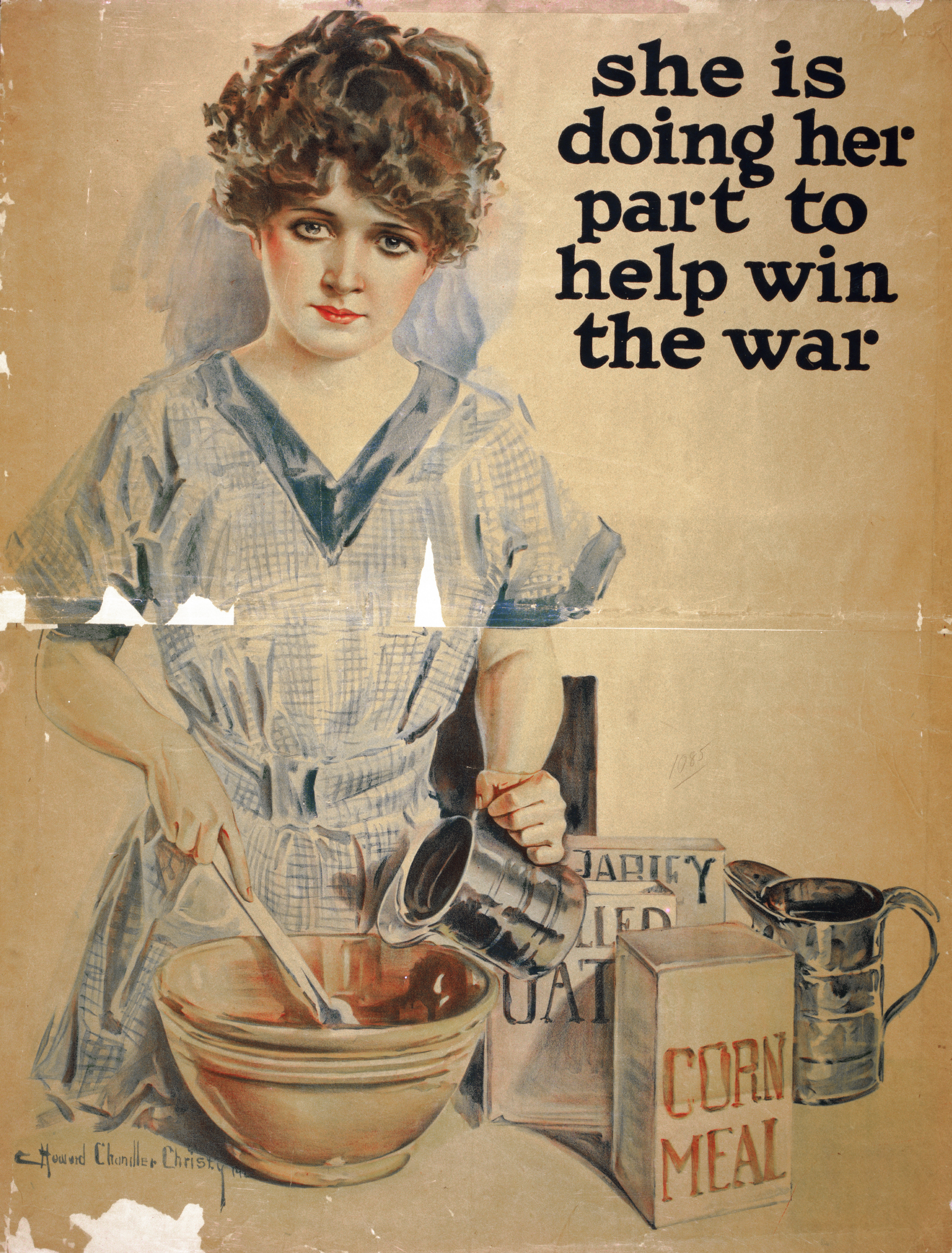
Girls too young for paid jobs learned how they could help the war effort.

=== Children ===
World War I affected children in the United States through several social and economic changes in the school curriculum and through shifts in parental relationships. For example, a number of fathers and brothers entered the war, and many were subsequently maimed in action or killed, causing many children to be brought up by single mothers. Additionally, as the male workforce left for battle, mothers and sisters began working in factories to take their positions, and the family dynamic began to change; this affected children as they had less time to spend with family members and were expected to grow up faster and help with the war effort. Similarly, Woodrow Wilson called on children involved in youth organizations to help collect money for war bonds and stamps in order to raise money for the war effort. This was very important because the children were having a direct effect on the financial state of the United States government during World War I. As children were collecting large amounts of money outside of school, within the classroom, curriculum also began to change as a result of the war. Woodrow Wilson again became involved with these children as he implemented government pamphlets and programs to encourage war support through things like mandatory patriotism and nationalism classes multiple times a week. Even though war was not being fought on United States soil, children's lives were greatly affected as all of these changes were made to their daily lives as a result of the conflict.

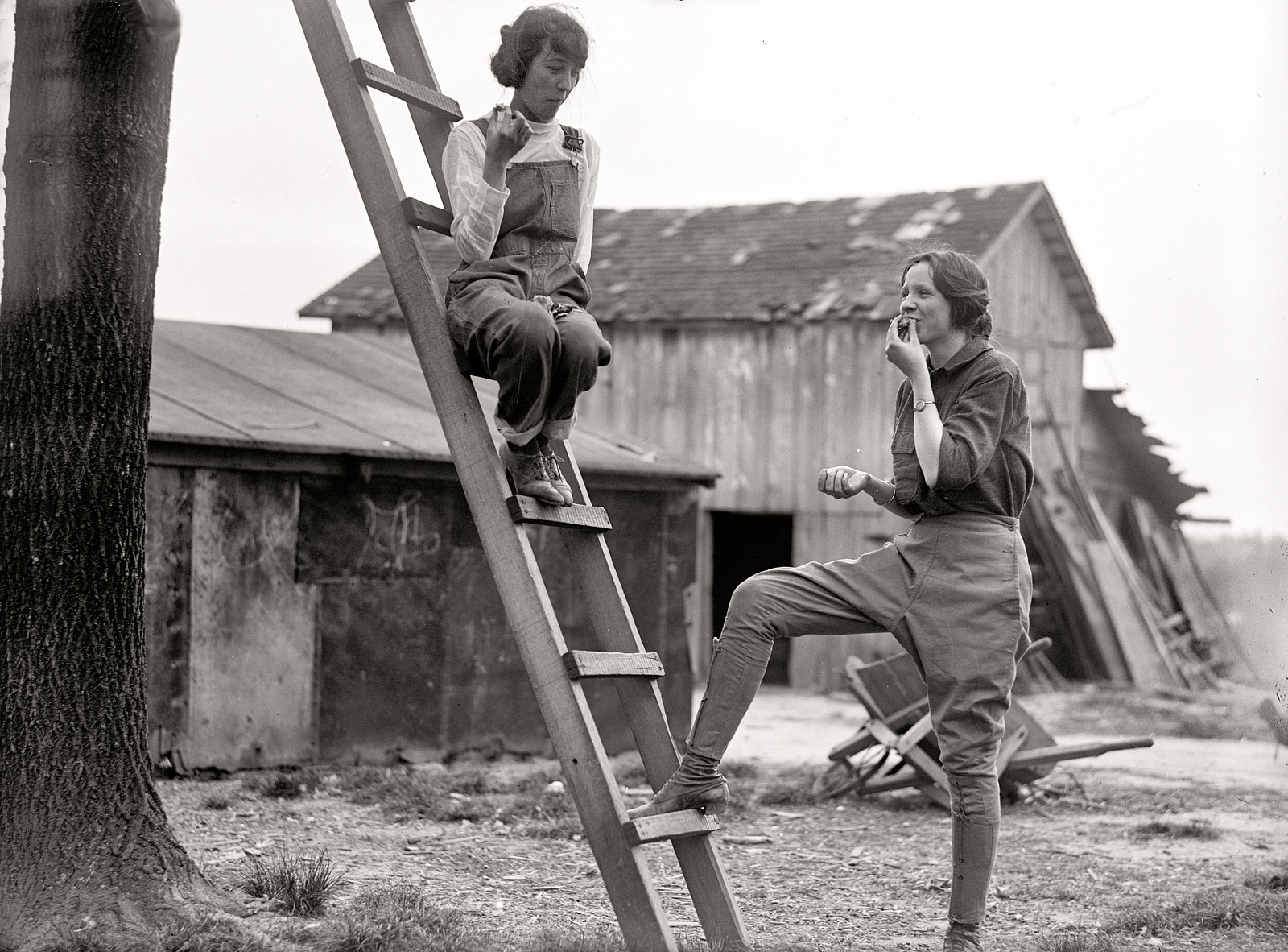
Victory gardeners, 1918

== Americanization of people with different ethnicities ==
The outbreak of war in 1914 increased concern about the millions of foreign born in the United States. The short-term concern was their loyalty to their native countries and the long-term was their assimilation into American society. Numerous agencies became active in promoting "Americanization" so that people of differing ethnicities would be psychologically and politically loyal to the U.S. The states set up programs through their Councils of National Defense; numerous federal agencies were involved, including the Bureau of Education, the United States Department of the Interior and the Food Administration. The most important private organization was the National Americanization Committee (NAC) directed by Frances Kellor. Second in importance was the Committee for Immigrants in America, which helped fund the Division of Immigrant Education in the federal Bureau of Education.

The war prevented millions of recently arrived immigrants from returning to Europe as they originally intended. The great majority decided to stay in America. Foreign language use declined dramatically. They welcomed Americanization, often signing up for English classes and using their savings to buy homes and bring over other family members.

Kellor, speaking for the NAC in 1916, proposed to combine efficiency and patriotism in her Americanization programs. It would be more efficient, she argued, once the factory workers could all understand English and therefore better understand orders and avoid accidents. Once Americanized, they would grasp American industrial ideals and be open to American influences and not subject only to strike agitators or foreign propagandists. The result, she argued would transform indifferent and ignorant residents into understanding voters, to make their homes into American homes, and to establish American standards of living throughout communities of various ethnicities. Ultimately, she argued it would "unite foreign-born and native alike in enthusiastic loyalty to our national ideals of liberty and justice.

== Alien internments ==
German citizens were required to register with the federal government and carry their registration cards at all times. 2,048 German citizens were imprisoned beginning in 1917, and all were released by spring 1920. Allegations against them included spying for Germany or endorsing the German war effort. They ranged from immigrants suspected of sympathy for their native land, civilian German sailors on merchant ships in U.S. ports when war was declared, and Germans who worked part of the year in the United States, including 29 players from the Boston Symphony Orchestra and other prominent musicians.

== Anti-German activity ==
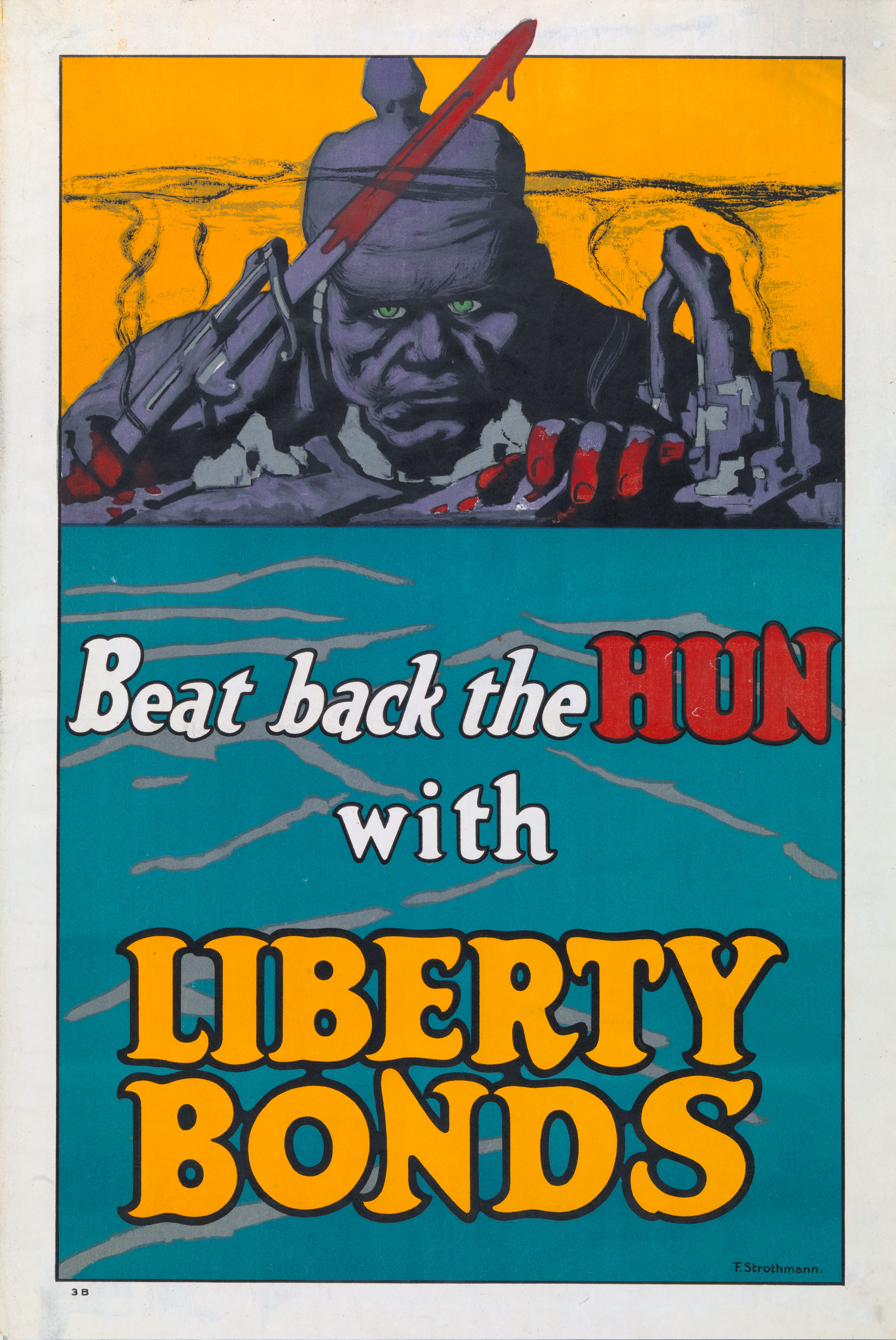
1918 bond posters with germanophobic slogans

German Americans by this time usually had only weak ties to Germany; however, they were fearful of negative treatment they might receive if the United States entered the war (such mistreatment was already happening to German-descent citizens in Canada and Australia). Almost none called for intervening on Germany's side, instead calling for neutrality and speaking of the superiority of German culture. They were increasingly marginalized, however, and by 1917 had been excluded almost entirely from national discourse on the subject. Voluntary vigilance committees such as the American Protective League, Boy Spies of America, and Knights of Liberty worked in an effort to root out potential disloyalty – often through hearsay – and often responding with intimidation and violence, including tarring and feathering attacks.

When the war began, overt examples of German culture came under attack. Many churches cut back or ended their German-language services. German parochial schools switched to the use of English in the classroom. Courses in German were dropped from public high school curricula. Some street names were changed. One person was killed by a mob at a tavern in a southern Illinois mining town.

== War bonds ==
Elaborate propaganda campaigns were launched to encourage Americans to buy Liberty bonds. In ethnic centers, ethnic groups were pitted against each other so that groups were encouraged to purchase more bonds compared to their historic rivals in order to demonstrate superior patriotism.

== Attacks on the U.S. ==
The Central Powers carried out a number of acts of sabotage and a single submarine attack against the U.S. while being neutral and belligerent with the country during the war, but never staged an invasion, although there were rumors that German advisers were present at the Battle of Ambos Nogales.

=== Sabotage ===
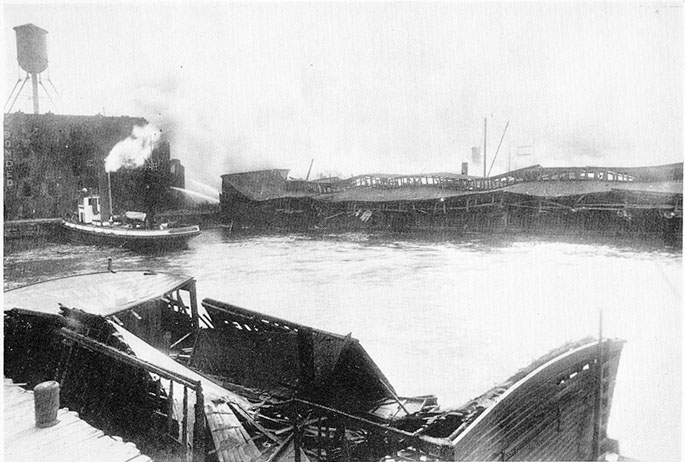
Black Tom Pier shortly after the explosion.

Numerous rumors of German plans for sabotage alarmed Americans. After midnight on July 30, 1916, a series of small fires were found on a pier in Jersey City, New Jersey. Sabotage was suspected and some guards fled, fearing an explosion; others attempted to fight the fires. Eventually, they called the Jersey City Fire Department. An explosion occurred at 2:08 a.m., the first and biggest of the explosions. Shrapnel from the explosion traveled long distances, some lodging in the Statue of Liberty and other places. Six months later, on 11 January 1917, German agents set fire at an ammunition assembly plant near Lyndhurst, New Jersey, causing a four-hour fire that destroyed half a million 3-inch explosive shells and destroyed the plant for an estimated at $17 million in damages.

On July 21, 1918, a German U-boat, SM U-156, positioned itself off of Orleans, Massachusetts and opened fire and sank a tugboat and some barges until it was driven off by American warplanes.

== See also ==
- American entry into World War I
- Victory garden
- Woman's Land Army of America
- Effect of World War I on Children in the United States
- 1917 New York City mayoral election
- United States home front during World War II
- German prisoners of war in the United States
- Home front during World War I, covering all major countries involved
  - Women's roles in the World Wars#World War I
  - British home front during the First World War
  - History of Germany during World War I
  - History of France during World War I
  - Belgium in World War I
