= Grizzly APC =

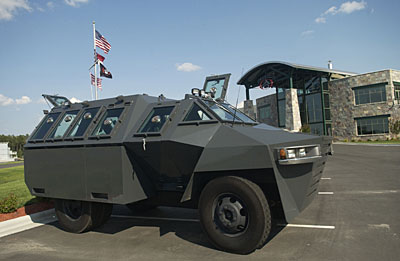
- Type: Armored personnel carrier
- Place of origin: United States

Specifications
- Mass: <30,000 pounds (14 t; 13 LT; 15 ST)
- Length: 263.75 in (6.70 m)
- Width: 102.25 in (2.60 m)
- Height: 105.25 in (2.67 m)
- Crew: 2+8
- Armor: AR500 Steel
- Main armament: Roof ringmount
- Engine: Diesel; 300 HP
- Suspension: 4×4 or 4x2 wheeled
- Operational range: 350 mi (560 km)
- Maximum speed: 105 km/h (65 mph)

The Grizzly APC is a 22-ton infantry mobility vehicle designed and manufactured by Academi for urban combat.

== Design ==
4x2, 4x4, and 6x6 versions with three different Caterpillar diesel engines are available.

Its armor, called the "Blackwater High Threat Armor Protection System" is claimed to defeat 12.7 mm .50 caliber heavy machine gun rounds as well as IEDs. It is constructed of AR500 steel, and incorporates angled walls and a v-hull chassis to deflect the blast waves produced by explosives. It uses Fiber-Tek armor reinforced belly and lowers, with a fully enclosed drive train. ArmorThane tactical coating on the interior and exterior reduces spall probability.

There are two top-side egress hatches, five gun ports (two on each side and one in rear), and bullet resistant glass windows, capable of NIJ level 3 protection. The Grizzly makes use of forward and rear 400,000+ candle power halogen searchlights, which can be operated remotely. It also has a ringmount roof turret, capable of mounting a 12.7mm heavy machine gun, which may be operated from a remote weapon station.

Blackwater USA submitted two Grizzly APC vehicles to the U.S. military, with EXO Scale anti-EFP appliqué armor from ARES Systems Group, for the MRAP II competition at the Aberdeen Proving Ground. According to the Army Times, the armor passed the testing, but the vehicle failed due to limited armor on the forward area of the vehicle (pictures on ARES' website shows less armor was used over the frontal area of the cab.) Blackwater had been hoping to discuss adding more armor to the forward area and threatened an automatic protest but it was disregarded, according to an Army Times source.

== Production ==
The Grizzly is manufactured by Blackwater Armored Vehicle, a division of Academi (formerly known as Blackwater Worldwide and Xe Services LLC), in a 70,000-square-foot (6,500 m^{2}) factory in Camden, North Carolina. It was scheduled to begin production in April 2007 and Blackwater predicted production of at least a vehicle a day to meet demand. However, the Grizzly was not selected by the US Army in 2008 and lack of projected non-US-military sales have forced cutbacks in staff at the plant.

The first Grizzly was built on a commercial GMC (automobile) chassis. The current versions are built on a custom chassis supplied by Seagrave Fire Apparatus, Clintonville, Wisconsin.

As the Grizzly never got adopted by the US Army, its remaining vehicles eventually became available in the civilian market. In April 2024, the family of a fallen Ukrainian soldier, Andrii Seniv, bought and donated one to the 10th Mountain Assault Brigade.

== See also ==
- List of AFVs
- MRAP (armored vehicle)
