= Seagrave Fire Apparatus =

Firefighting apparatus manufacturer

- Industry: Trucks and other vehicles
- Founded: 1881; 145 years ago
- Founder: Fredric Seagrave
- Headquarters: Clintonville, Wisconsin, USA
- Products: Emergency services vehicles
- Parent: ELB Capital Management, LLC
- Website: http://www.seagrave.com/

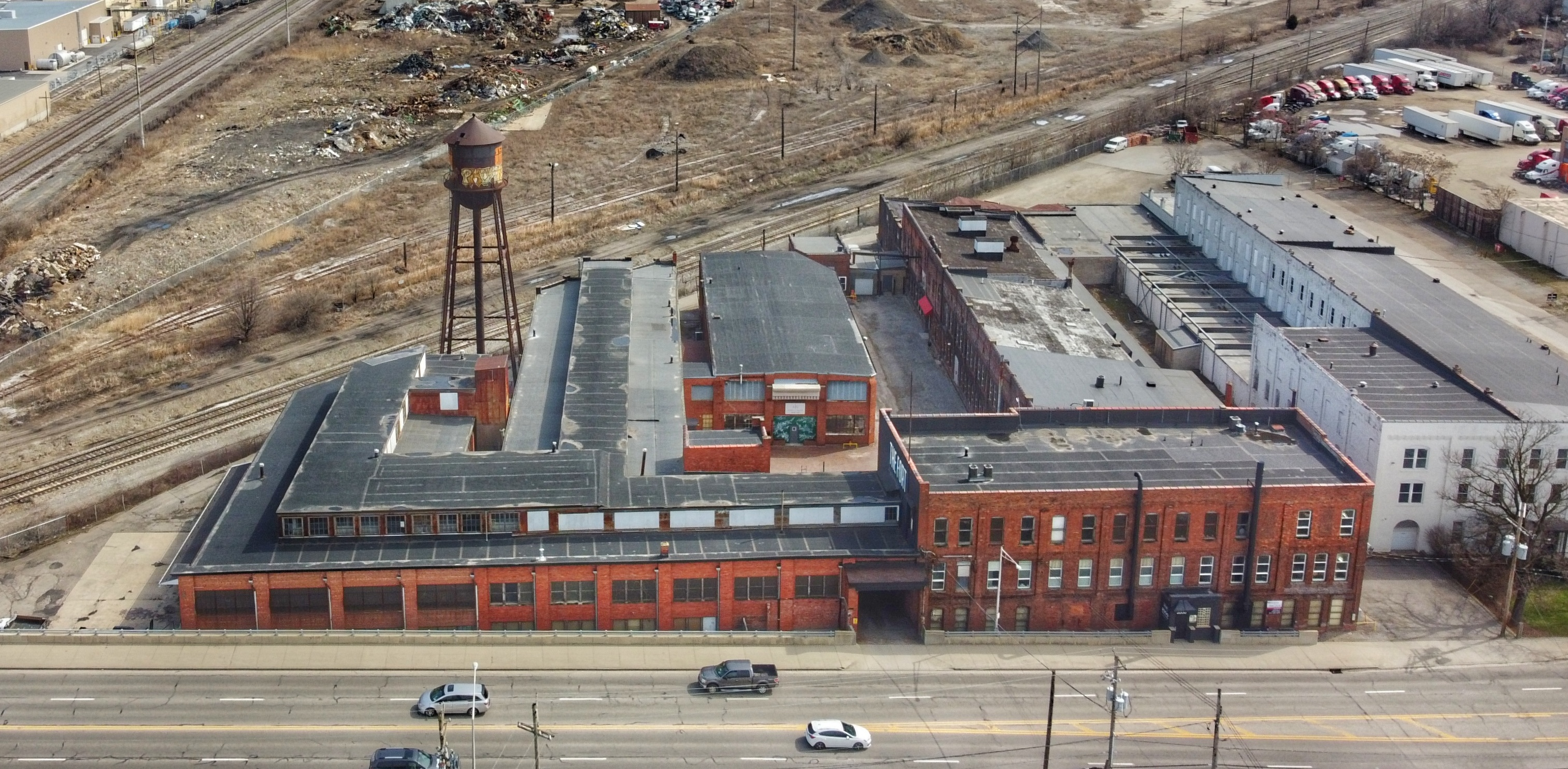
The manufacturer's former factory in Columbus, Ohio

Seagrave on Frayer-Miller Chassis (1908)

Seagrave ladder truck (1908)

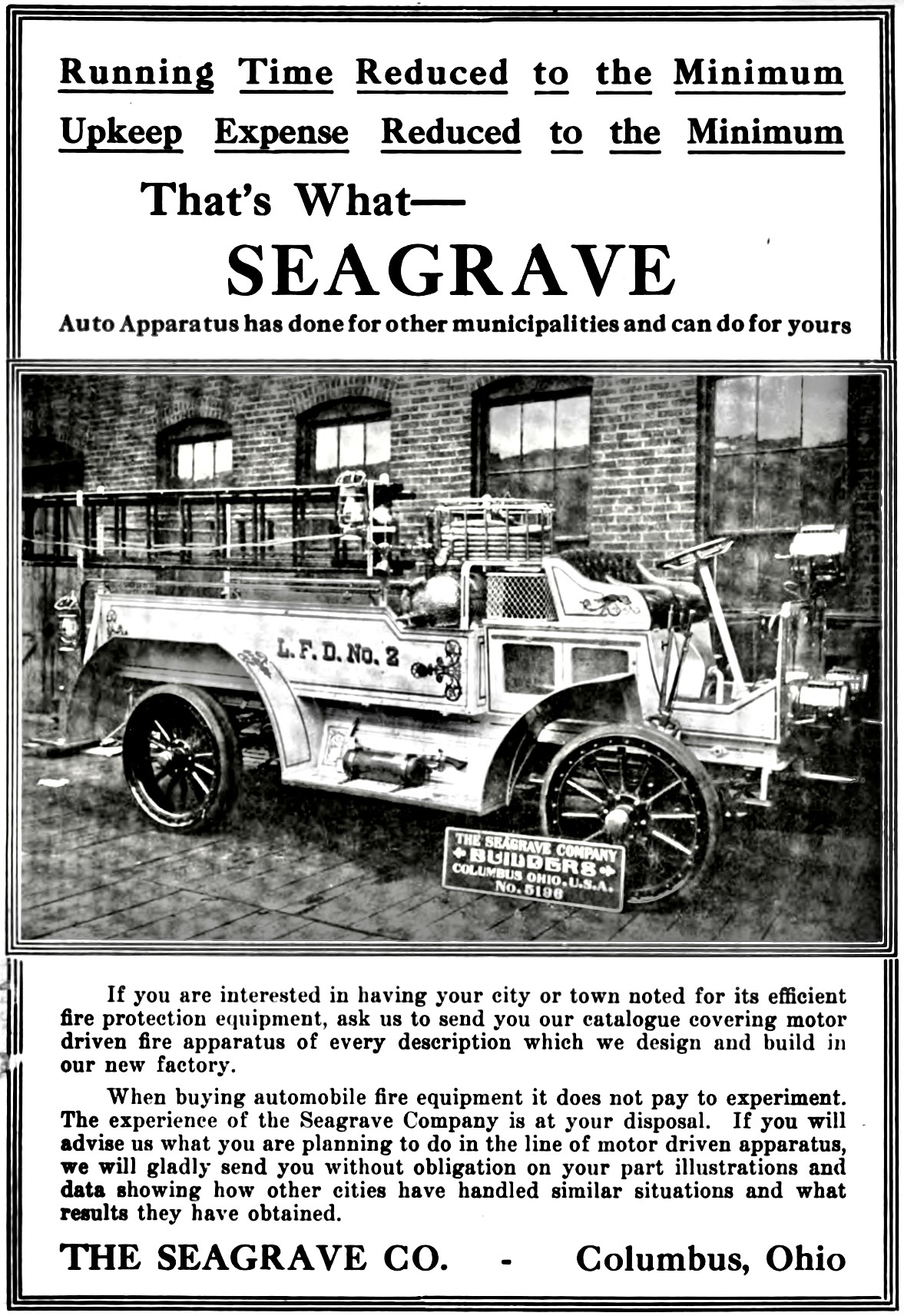
Seagrave advertisement (1911)

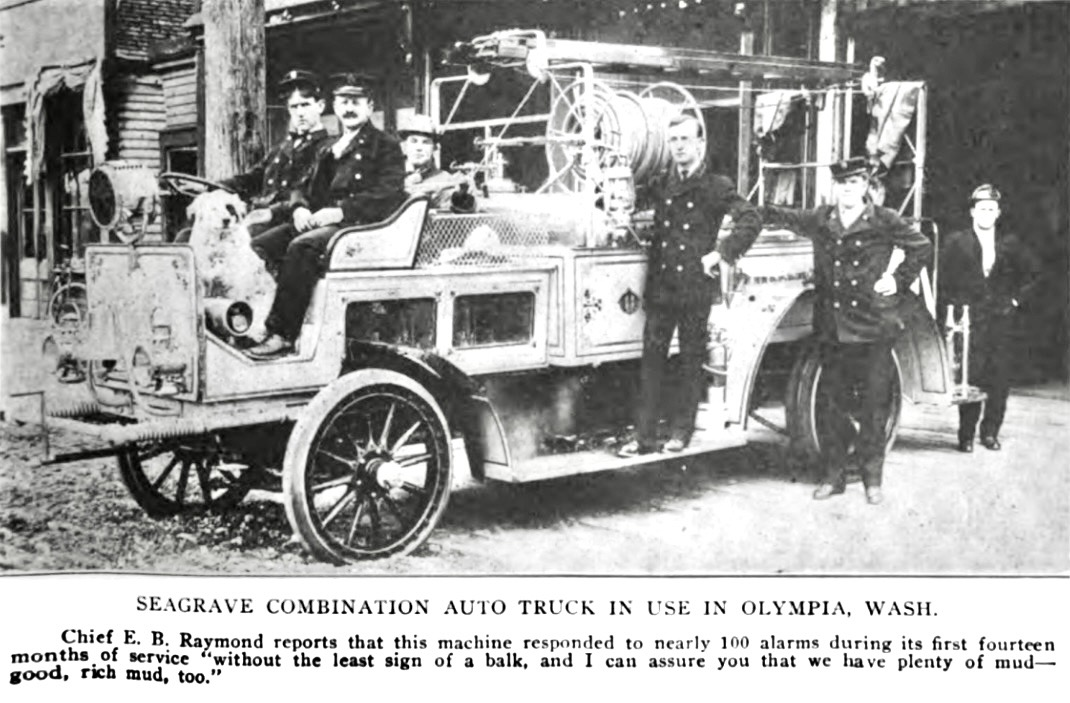
Seagrave Fire Engine (1912)

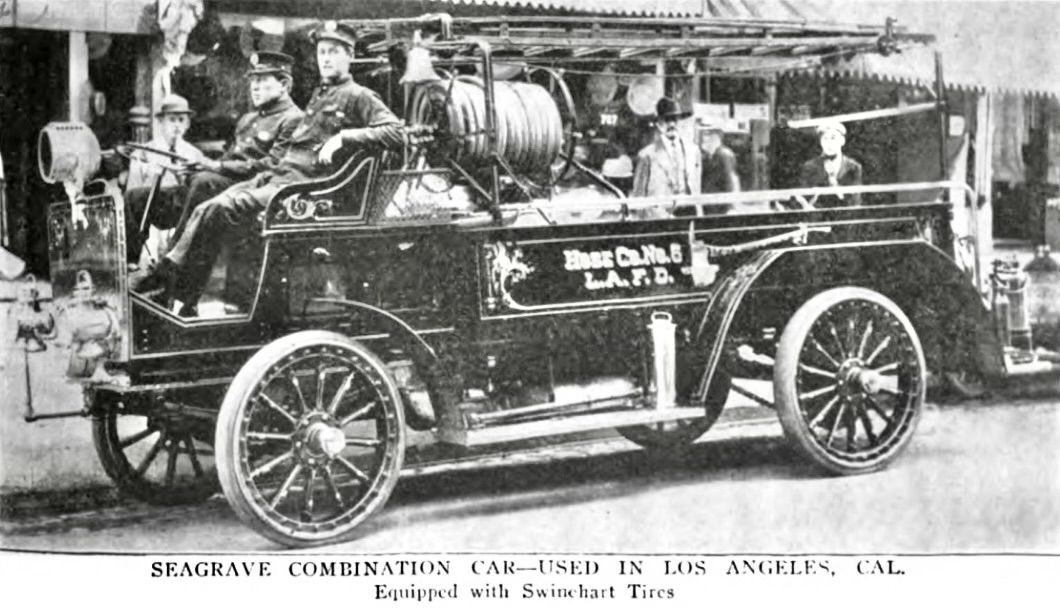
Seagrave Combination Car (1912)

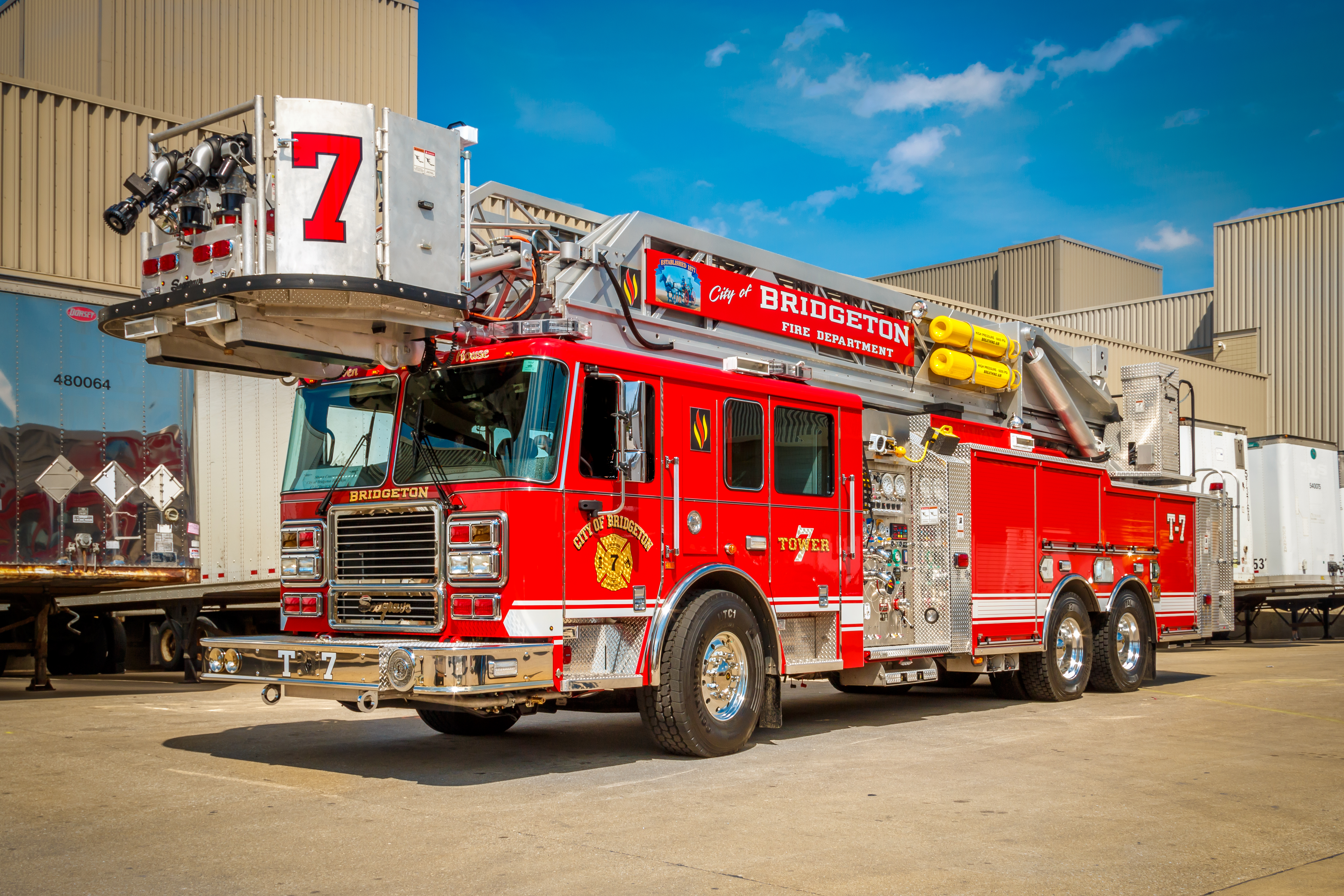
Seagrave Marauder II with Apollo II 105' Tower

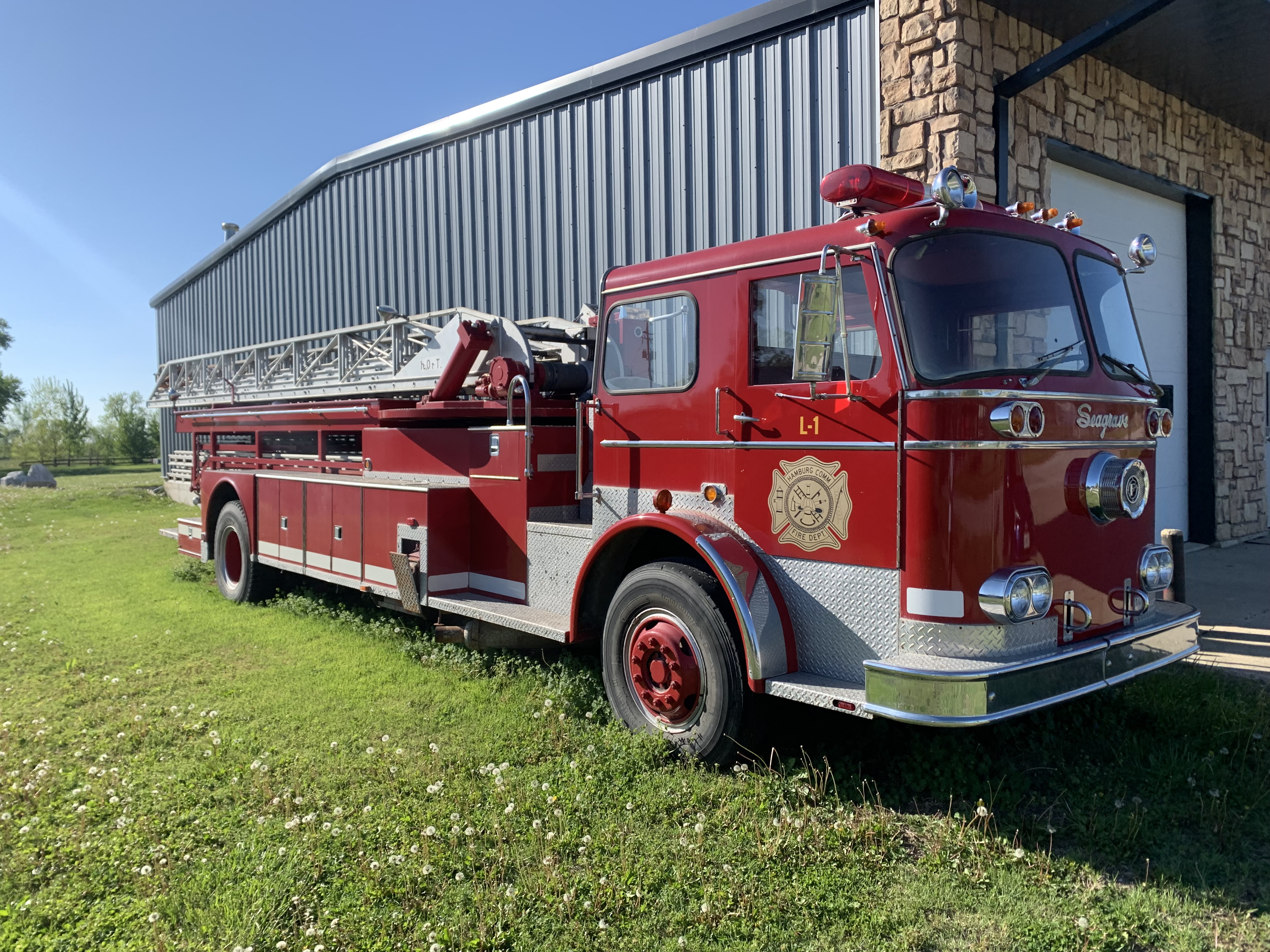
1969 Seagrave KA20756 100’ RM aerial from the Hamburg VFD in Hamburg, IA

Seagrave Fire Apparatus LLC is an American fire apparatus manufacturer that specializes in pumper and rescue units, as well as aerial towers. In addition to manufacturing new equipment, they refurbish, repair and upgrade older Seagrave apparatus, including National Fire Protection Association updates to equipment. Seagrave operates manufacturing facilities in Clintonville, Wisconsin, and Rock Hill, South Carolina, and is an authorized General Services Administration vendor and supplies the federal government of the United States with firefighting equipment.

== History ==
Seagrave was founded in Detroit, Michigan, in 1881 by Fredric Seagrave and moved to Columbus, Ohio, in 1891. Seagrave was acquired by the FWD Corporation in 1963 and moved their corporate headquarters and manufacturing plant to Clintonville, Wisconsin.

Randolph Lenz, Chair of FWD's parent company, Corsta Corp., became embroiled in a Federal Deposit Insurance Corporation suit and in 2003 all assets of FWD, including FWD Corporation, Seagrave, Baker Aerialscope and Almonte Fire Trucks, were sold to an investment group headed by former American LaFrance executive James Hebe.

Today, the Seagrave group is a flagship company of ELB Capital Management.

=== Canadian operations ===
Around 1900, Seagrave opened a Canadian plant and subsequently sold a full range of apparatus until 1936. Entering into an alliance with well-known Canadian fire engine builder R. S. Bickle Co "Canadianized" versions of standard Seagrave rigs were assembled at Bickle's Woodstock, Ontario, plant, and sold under the Bickle-Seagrave banner. After several ownership changes, and closure in 1956, Bickle's successor King-Seagrave Ltd. continued to assemble Seagrave fire apparatus until 1973, when FWD Corp opted not to renew its agreement. King continued to produce fire apparatus on commercial chassises until its closure in 1985.

Seagrave purchased Canadian apparatus builder Almonte Fire Trucks of Carleton Place, Ontario, in 1999. The Carleton Place plant built commercial chassis apparatus and served the Canadian market. Production ceased in 2010, and the building was sold to Eastway Emergency Vehicles.

== Products ==
1920

- Model 240
- Model 260
- Model 760
- Model 856

1921

- Model 240
- Model 260
- Model 760
- Model 856

=== Chassis ===
- Capitol Full-tilt cab - Current Chassis Design
- Marauder II Full-tilt cab - Current Chassis Design
- Attacker HD Split-tilt cab - Current Chassis Design
- Commercial - Current Chassis Design
- Grizzly APC - Current Chassis Design
- Marauder - Out of Production
- Concorde - Out of Production
- Commander II - Out of Production
- Commander - Out of Production
- Flame - Out of Production

=== Fire apparatus ===
- Fire Engines
  - Custom Pumper
  - Commercial Pumper
  - Commercial Quick Attack Pumper
  - Custom Pumper Tanker
  - Commercial Pumper Tanker
  - Custom Rescue Pumper
  - Commercial Rescue Pumper
- Fire Trucks
  - Apollo II 105' Rear-Mount Platform Tower Ladder
  - Aerialscope II 75' Mid Mount Tower Ladder
  - Aerialscope II 95' Mid Mount Tower Ladder
  - Force Aerial Ladder
  - Meanstick Quint 500lb tip load
  - Tractor Drawn Aerial Ladder
  - Patriot ladder 100' 250lb tip load
  - TowerMax Rear Mount Platform Tower Ladder (Out of Production)
  - TowerMax Mid Mount Platform Tower Ladder (Out of Production)
  - Apollo Rear Mount Platform Tower Ladder (Out of Production)
- Tankers
  - Custom Tanker
  - Commercial Tanker
- Rescues
  - Specialist Rescue/HazMat
