= Luella Bates =

American woman truck driver (1897–1985)

Promotional photo of Luella Bates driving a FWD Model B truck, 1922

Luella Bates (b. Luella Born, October 17, 1897 – d. Luella Coates, November 25, 1985) is believed to be the first licensed woman truck driver.

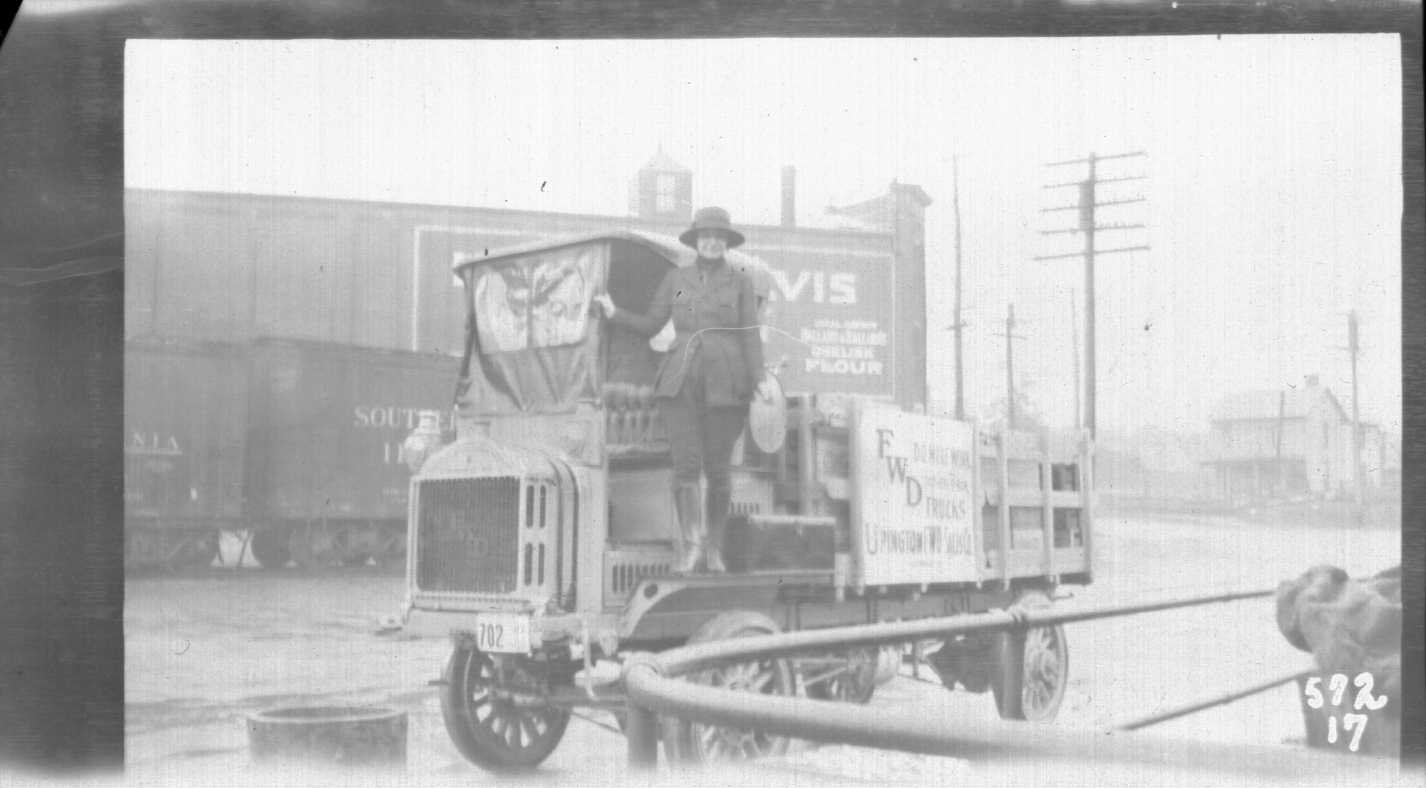
Bates standing next to her FWD model B truck circa 1919.

Luella Bates was the first of six female employees of the Four Wheel Drive Auto Co. chosen as test and demonstration drivers and worked as an FWD truck driver from 1918 to 1922. During World War I she was a test driver traveling throughout the state of Wisconsin in a Model B truck. After the war, when the majority of the women working at Four Wheel Drive were let go, she remained as a demonstrator and driver.

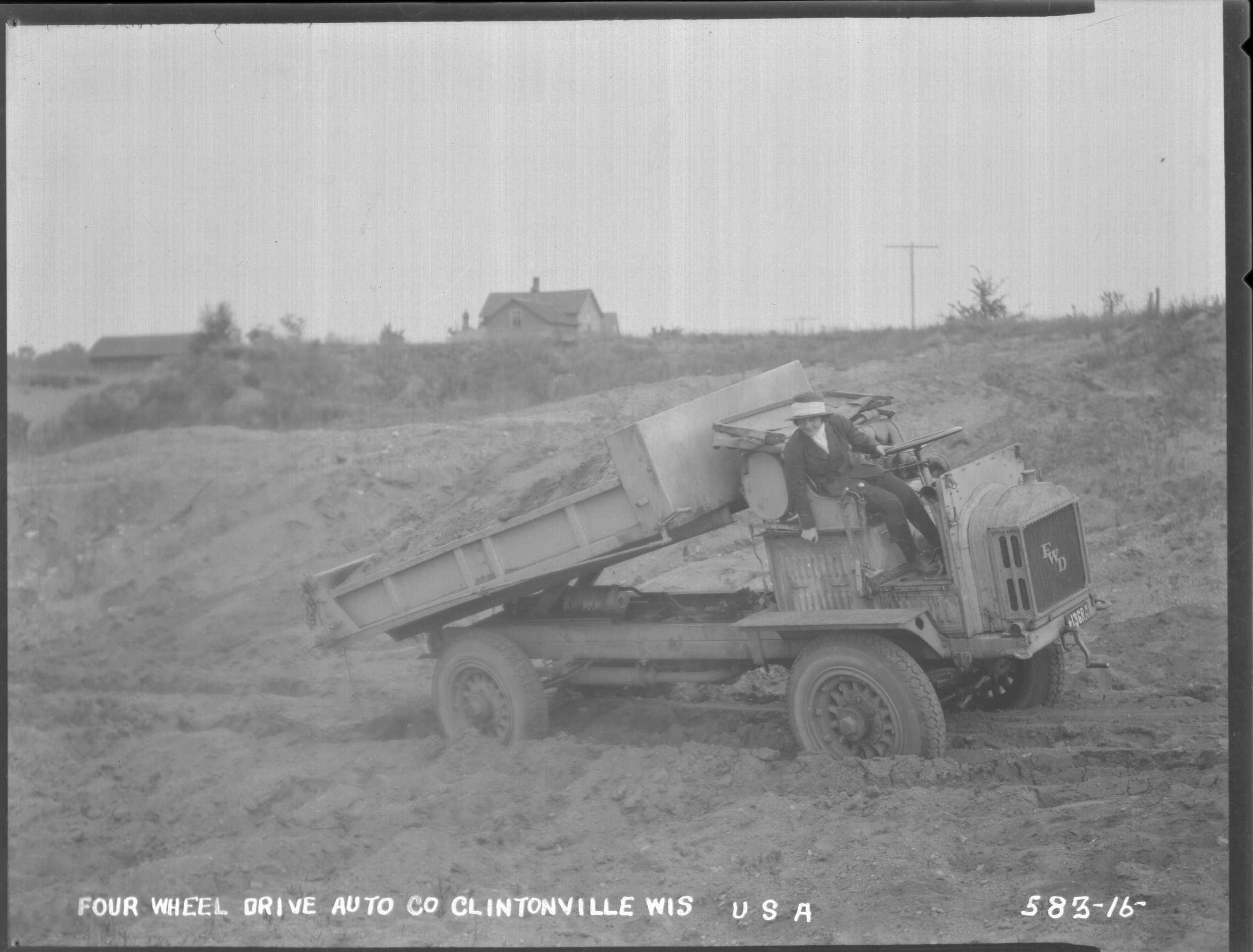
Bates unloading sand from a FWD Model B truck.

In January 1920, Bates drove a Model B to New York City, where she attended the New York Auto Show. During her stay, she met with Secretary of State of New York Francis Hugo and became the first woman truck driver to receive a driver's license in New York.

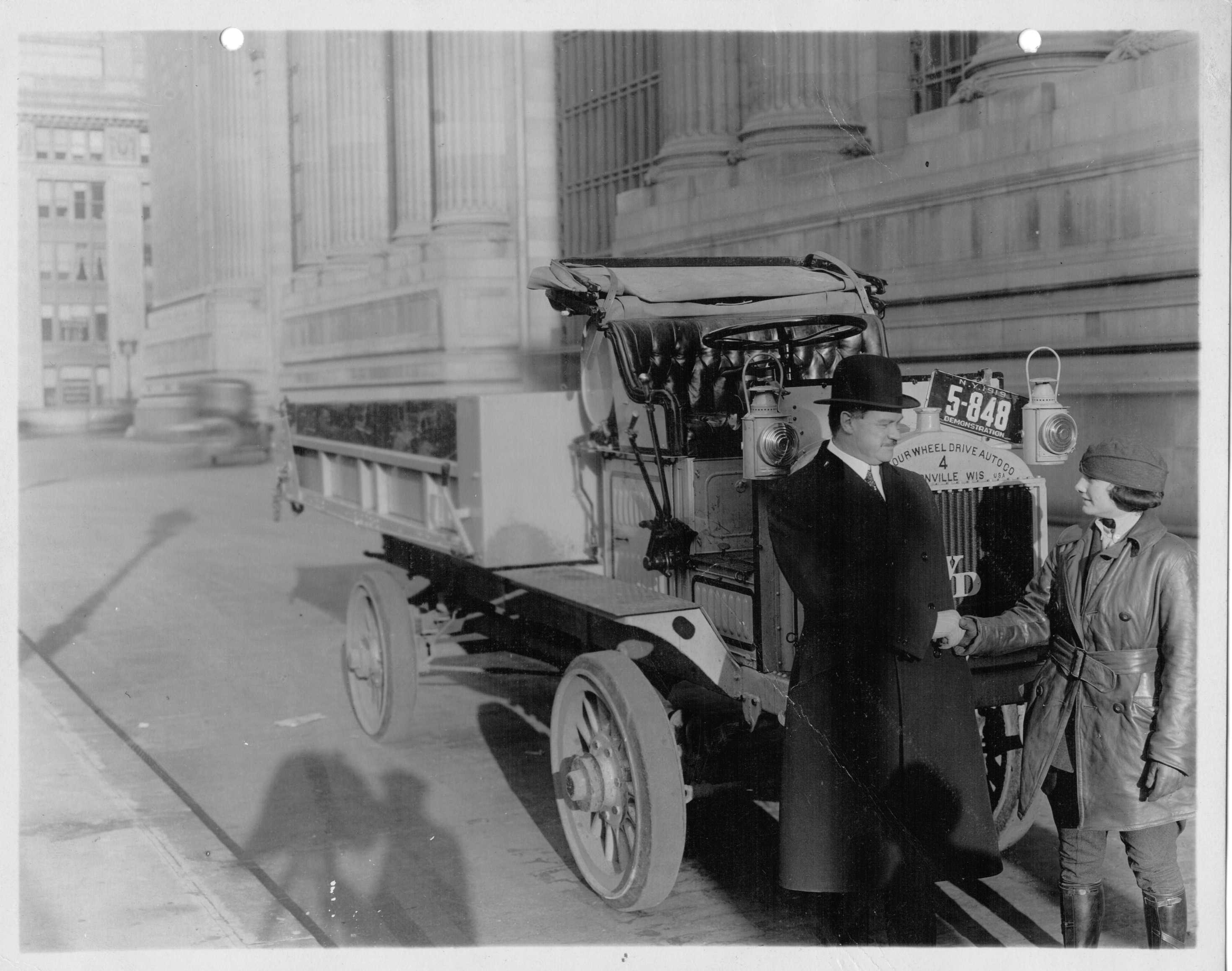
Bates shaking hands with New York Secretary of State Francis Hugo, January 1920.

Bates was such a hit in New York that Four Wheel Drive decided to utilize her skills even further. In 1920, they sent her on three transcontinental tours throughout the United States. The advertising scheme introduced the idea that the FWD truck was easy to steer, as evidenced by a woman driver. During her first tour, she represented Francis Hugo's Safety First Campaign.

She toured approximately 25 towns, beginning in Kansas City, Missouri, and finishing in Belefontaine, Ohio. While in Erie, Pennsylvania, she flew over the city in an "earoplane" and saturated Erie with information about the Four Wheel Drive Company and its vehicles. In May 1920, Popular Science magazine referred to her as "exhibit A for feminine efficiency."

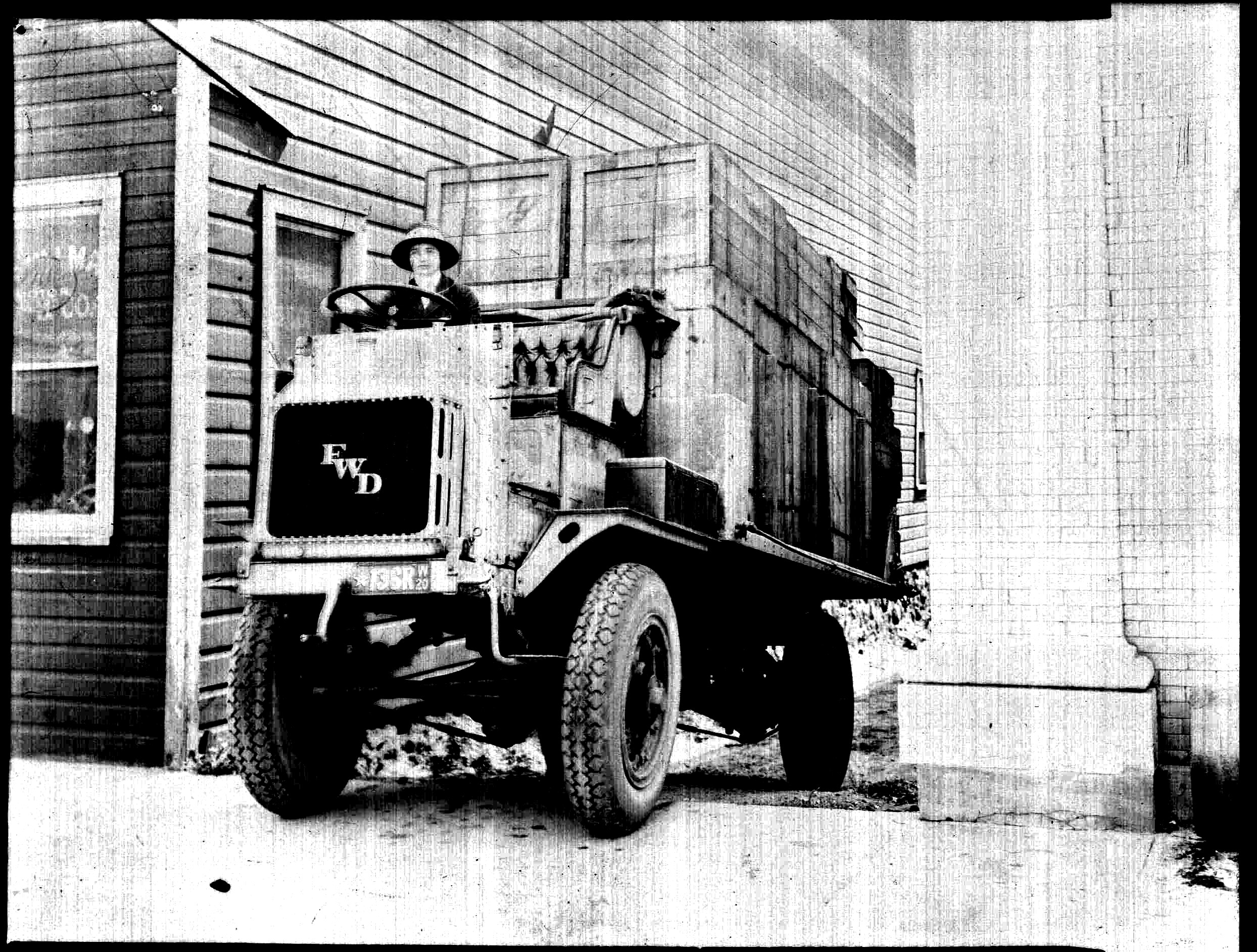
Bates driving a truck in Clintonville, Wisconsin.

She returned to Clintonville, Wisconsin, in late July 1920. She began her next tour within the month, traveling to state fairs throughout the eastern United States. In September, she drove her truck loaded with coal through the streets of Utica, New York. Both an expert driver and a mechanic, Bates was more than capable of completing all maintenance on her truck.

Bates doing maintenance on a FWD Model B truck.

During her final tour of 1920, Bates took the southern states by storm. She was now known as "our girl driver." In Oklahoma, she defied the police and took her truck across a flooded road, hauling meat for a packaging plant. This courageous venture led to the sale of ten trucks for Four Wheel Drive and much admiration for Bates. For the next two years, Bates traveled as a demonstrator, both locally and throughout the United States, demonstrating the Model B truck and the newly developed fire trucks.

Bates driving a FWD fire truck in Clintonville, Wisconsin, 1922

In early December 1922, Bates moved to Milwaukee, later marrying Howard Coates and having two sons. Her descendants include one granddaughter and three great-grandchildren, one of whom is actress Ashley Hinshaw.

Luella Bates has been included in several books about the Four Wheel Drive company, the history of trucking and the history of Clintonville, Wisconsin. During the infancy of the trucking industry, she played an important role in the history of women in trucking.
