= Four Wheel Drive =

American auto manufacturer, division of ELB Capital

Four Wheel Drive Auto Company
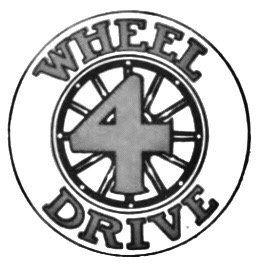
- FWD logo
- Industry: Automotive
- Founded: 1909 in Clintonville, Wisconsin
- Founders: Otto Zachow, William Besserdich
- Defunct: 2003

The Four Wheel Drive Auto Company, more often known as Four Wheel Drive (FWD), was a pioneering American company that developed and produced all-wheel drive vehicles. It was founded in 1909 in Clintonville, Wisconsin, as the Badger Four-Wheel Drive Auto Company by Otto Zachow and William Besserdich. The first production facility was built in 1911 and was designed by architect Wallace W. DeLong of Appleton, Wisconsin.

FWD renamed FWD Corporation and its associates Seagrave, Baker Aerialscope, and Almonte Fire Trucks were sold in 2003 to an investment group headed by former American LaFrance executive James Hebe. Today, the Seagrave Fire Apparatus group is a flagship company of ELB Capital Management.

== History ==
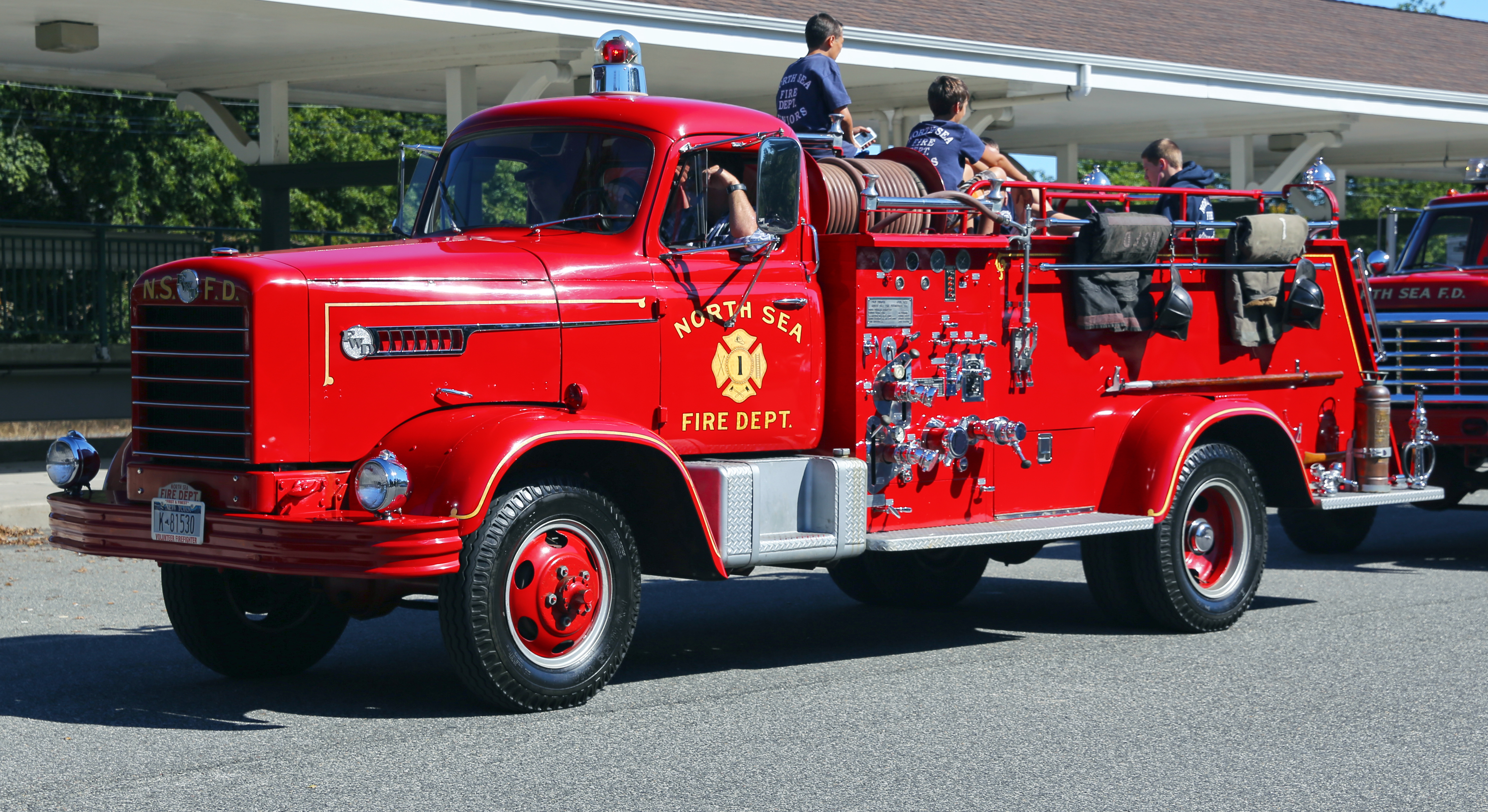
1958 FWD fire engine, North Sea FD

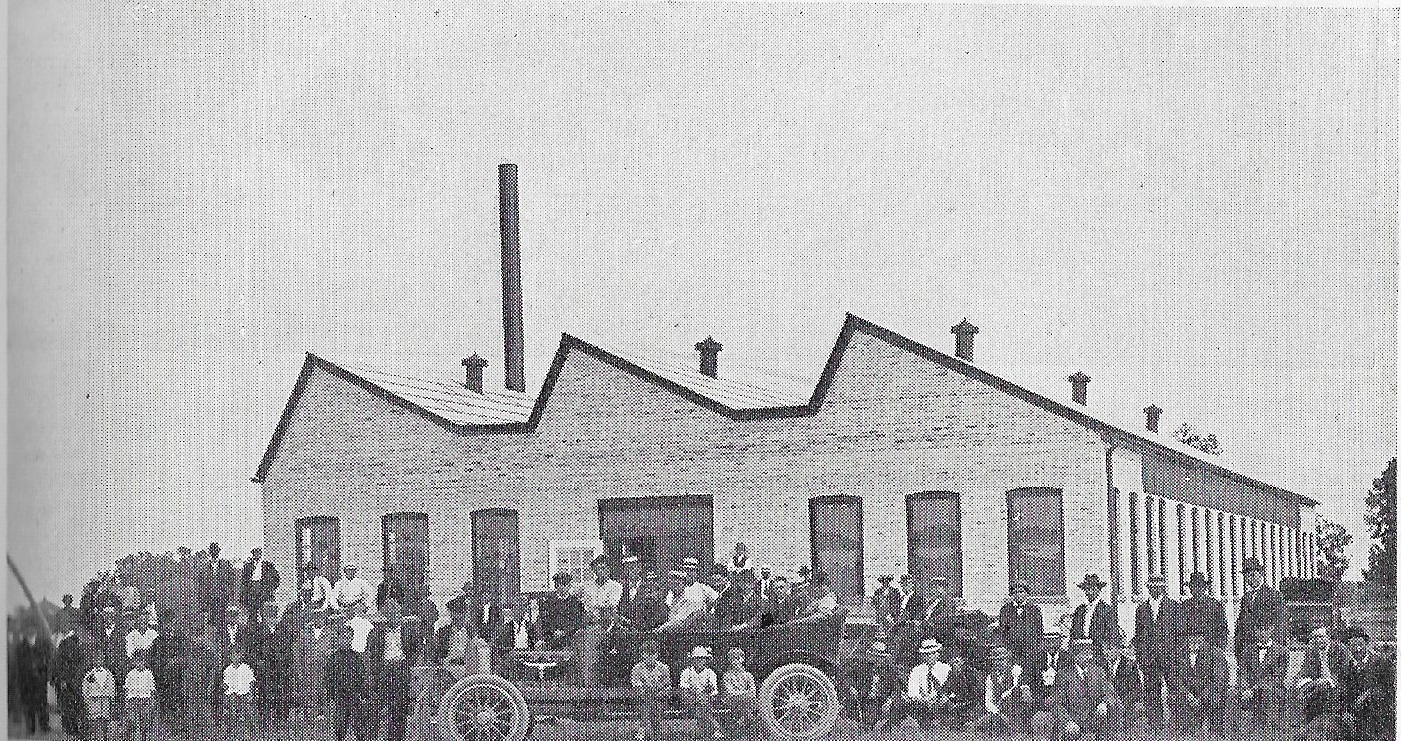
The Original Four Wheel Drive Auto Company building

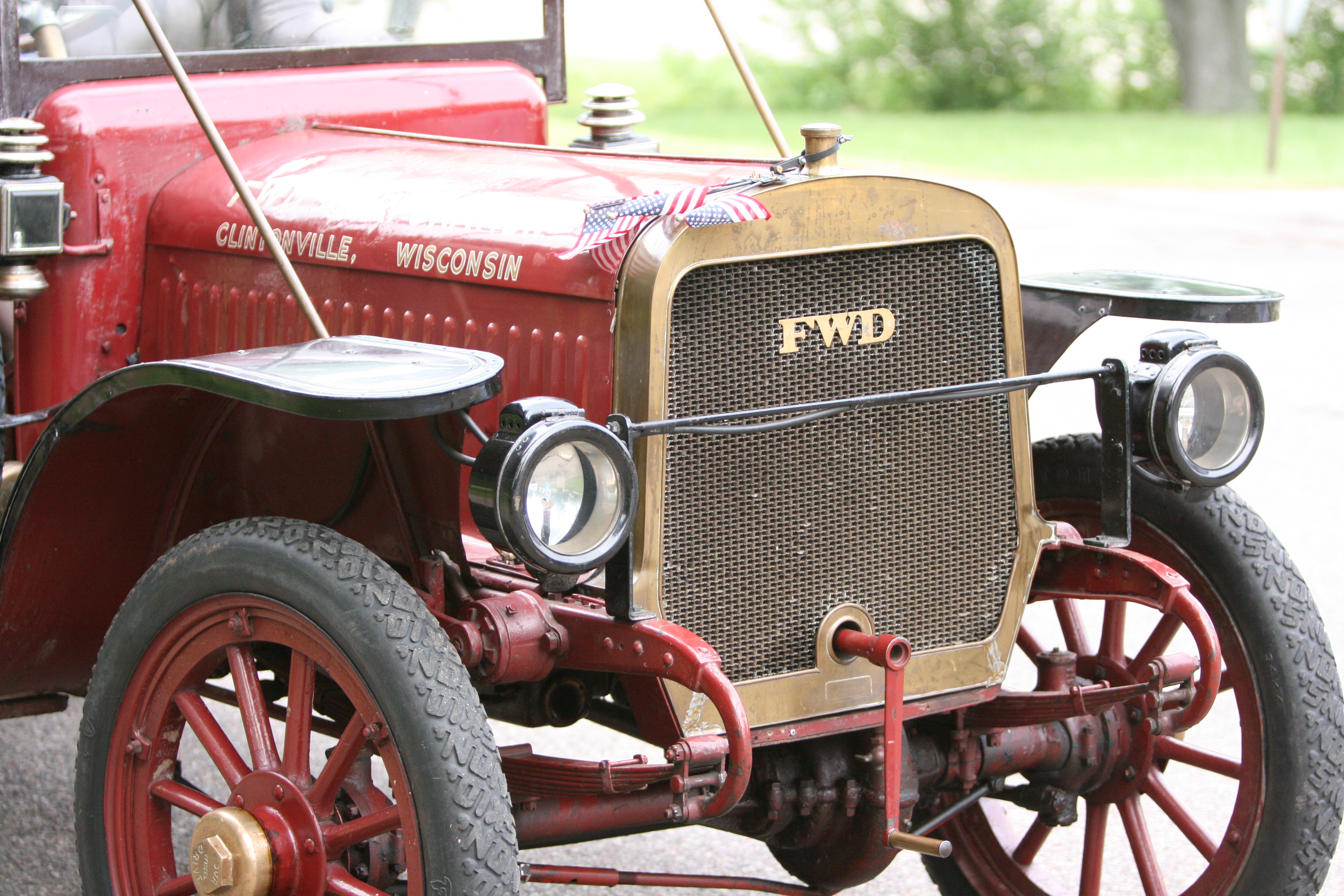
1909 Badger-FWD The Battleship

Four Wheel Drive advertisement (1913)

FWD war trucks (1916) over 1,000

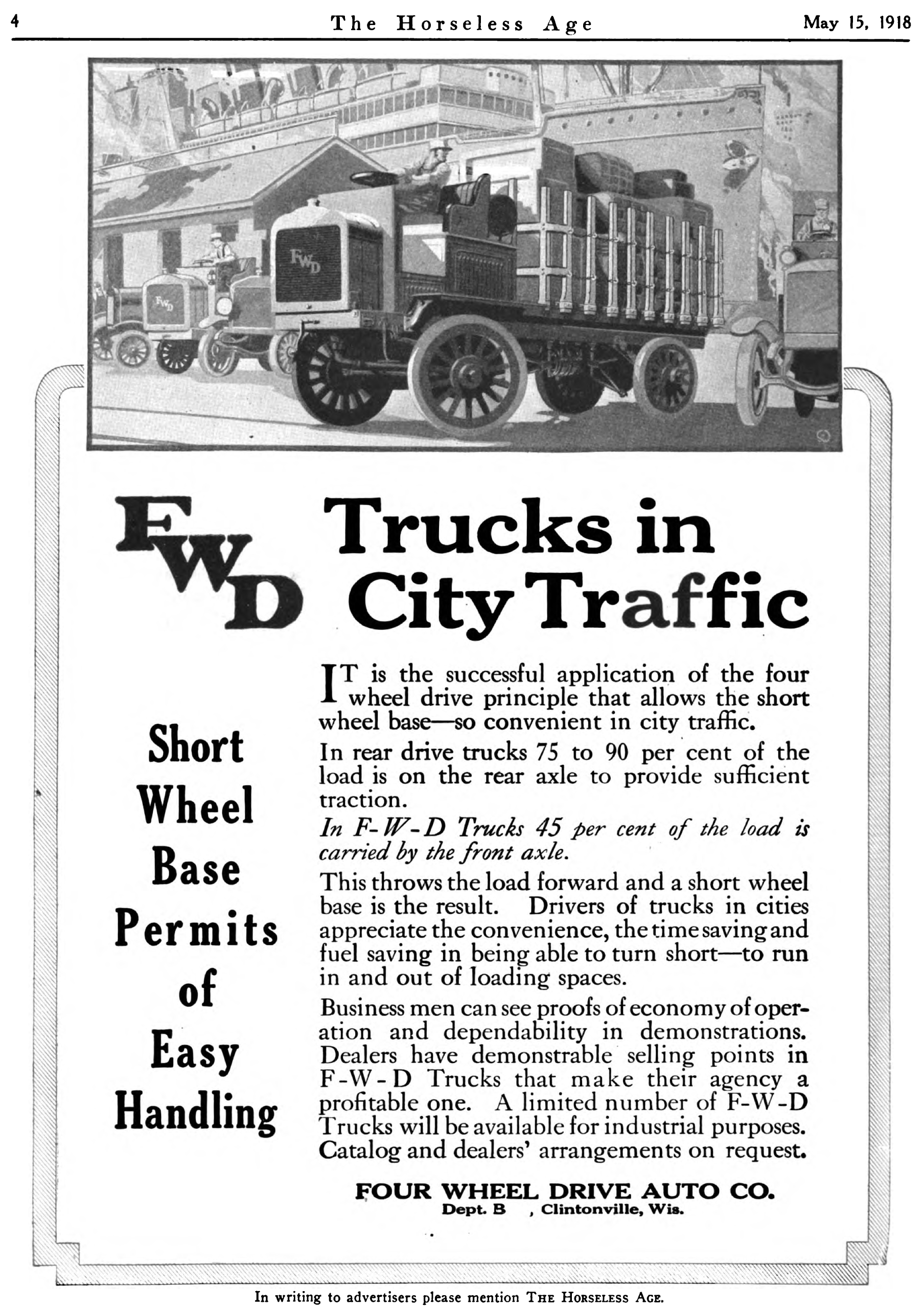
1918 ad in The Horseless Age

Zachow and Besserdich developed and built their first successful four-wheel drive (4x4) car, the "Battleship", in 1908. Its success led to the founding of the company. "Badger" was dropped from the name in 1910. Besserdich and Zachow's patented full time four wheel drive system combined a lockable center differential with double-Y constant velocity universal joints for steering. In modern terms the "Battleship" would be considered all wheel drive, as all FWD products featured full-time four wheel drive with a lockable center differential.

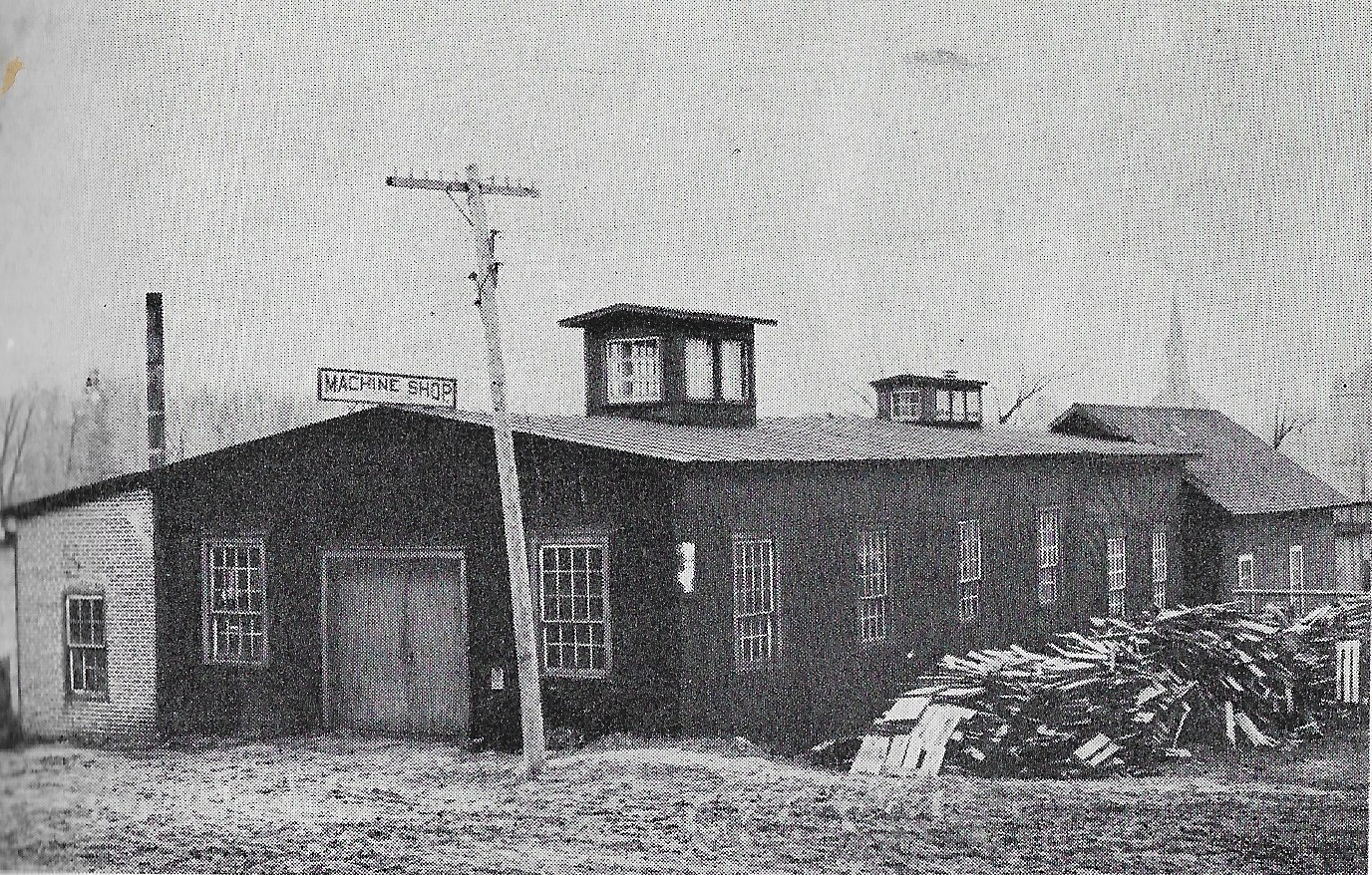
The Zachow and Besserdich Machine Shop, where they built their original four-wheel-drive vehicle

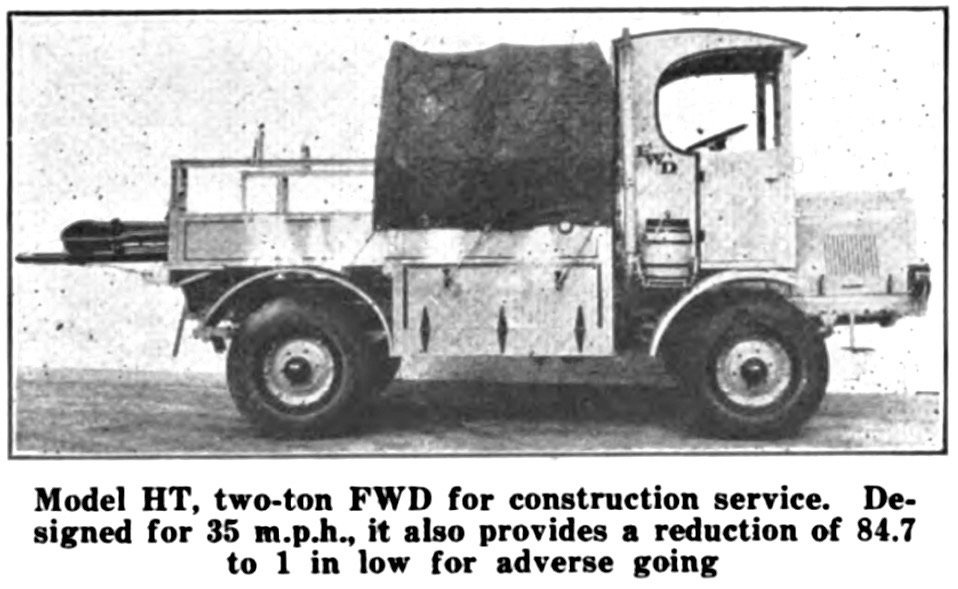
FWD Model HT (1927-1929)

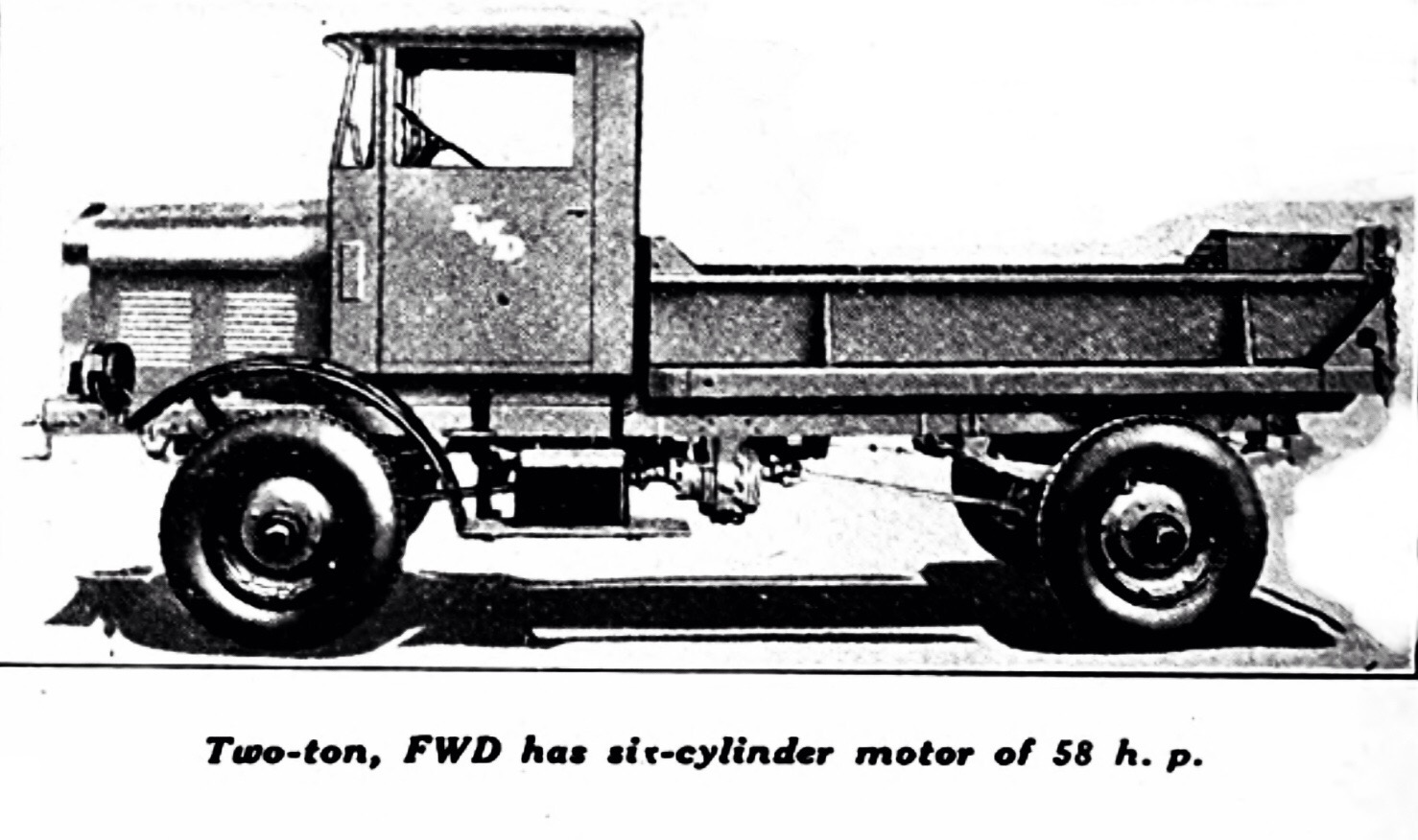
FWD Model H-6 (1929-1930) 58 HP Six-cylinder engine with 4257 cc displacement with a bore of 88.9 mm and a stroke of 114.3 mm

The success of the four-wheel drive in early military tests prompted the company to switch from cars to trucks. In 1916 the U.S. Army ordered 147 Model B three ton trucks for the Pancho Villa Expedition. The U.S. Army ordered 15,000 FWD Model B three ton trucks as the "Truck, 3 ton, Model 1917" during World War I with over 14,000 actually delivered; additional orders came from the United Kingdom and Russia. In two world wars, U.S. and allied armies depended on such four-wheel drive vehicles. Numerous FWD model B trucks, both military and civilian, survive in working condition; a Model 1917 U.S. Army truck in working condition is on display at the Fort MacArthur Military Museum, San Pedro, Los Angeles, California.

Early FWD vehicles were made with a track width of 4 feet 8 1/2 inches (1.435 m) so they could quickly be used on a standard gauge railway line merely by changing the wheels.

The FWD Model B was produced under license by four additional manufacturers during World War I: Peerless Motor Company, Cleveland, Ohio; Kissel Motor Car Company, Hartford, Wisconsin; Premier Motor Corporation, Indianapolis, Indiana; and Mitchell Motor Car Company, Racine, Wisconsin.

Three FWD Model B trucks were included in the 1919 Motor Transport Corps convoy. According to 1st Lt. E. R. Jackson, the official Ordnance Department observer: "The three (3) Four Wheel Drive Trucks were, in general, the most satisfactory in the Convoy and of all of the various makes represented, the F.W.D.'s alone were able to pull through all of the bad, muddy, and sandy stretches of road in Nebraska, Wyoming, Utah and Nevada absolutely unaided." (emphasis in the original.)

A Canadian subsidiary was set up in conjunction with Dominion Truck of Kitchener, Ontario by 1919.

A British subsidiary was set up at Slough in 1921. In 1926, the British FWD, also known as the Jeffery Quad, was produced with a larger 70 bhp engine.

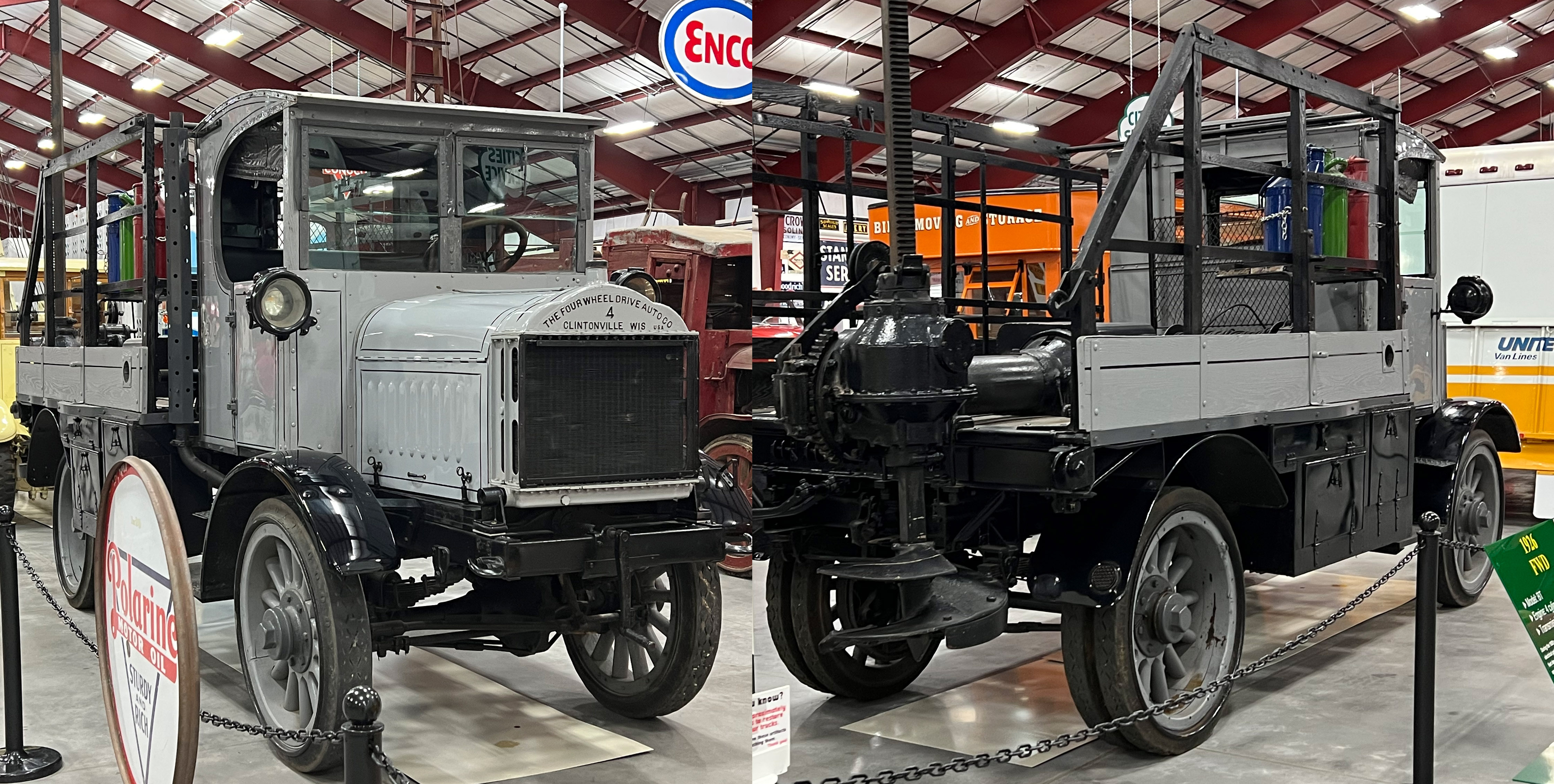
1926 FWD Model BT on display at the Iowa 80 Trucking Museum, Walcott, Iowa, seen from the front and back. This 13,400 pound truck was often used to drill holes for electrical poles.

A relationship with premier race car constructor Harry Miller resulted in the Four Wheel Drive Miller that competed successfully at the Indianapolis 500 in 1931 and later. This car was intended to demonstrate that the advantages FWD's lockable center differential were not limited to off-road driving. One example survives and has competed in premier vintage race car meets such as the Goodwood Festival of Speed. "The Last Great Miller" by Griffith Borgeson gives a complete history of this landmark car.

In 1932, AEC took a controlling interest in the British company and began to use more standard AEC components in the Slough-built vehicles. To distinguish these from imported U.S. FWD vehicles, they were marketed under the name Hardy. Production ceased about 1936, but AEC exploited its experience with all-wheel drive in its Second World War Matador (4x4) and Marshall (6x6) vehicles.

In 1939, the company formed a flight department. Their acquisition of a used Waco biplane would eventually evolve into North Central Airlines.

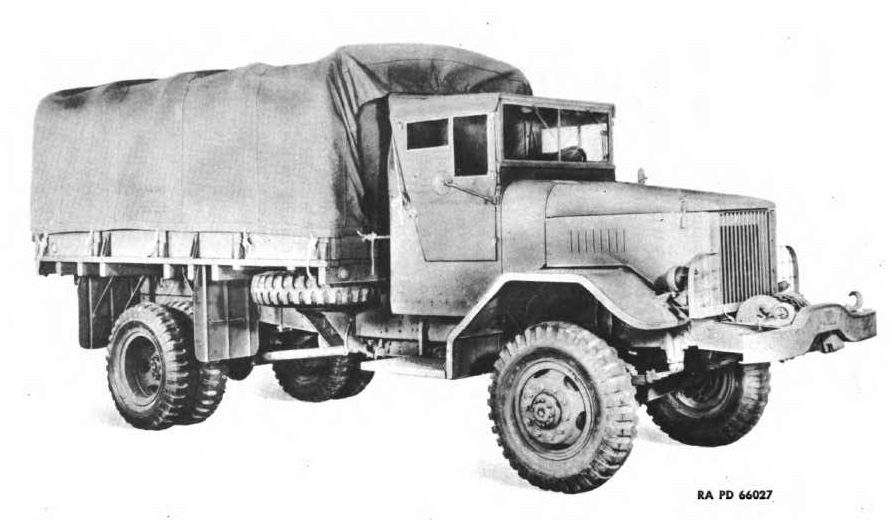
4-Ton Truck, 4x4 (Four Wheel Drive Model HAR-1)

During the Second World War the Four Wheel Drive Model HAR-1, a 4-Ton, 4x4 Truck, was produced and delivered to the US-Army. The US Army placed an order and between 7,000 and 9,000 were produced for them, although most of these were supplied to allies under Lend-Lease.

In 1958, the company's name was changed to FWD Corporation.

In 1963, FWD acquired Seagrave Fire Apparatus who then moved from their old location in Columbus, Ohio, to their current location at FWD in Clintonville, Wisconsin. Many tower ladders in the 1990s using Seagrave chassis were branded as FWD. They used Baker Aerialscopes for the boom which FWD had also acquired over the years along with Almonte Fire Trucks.

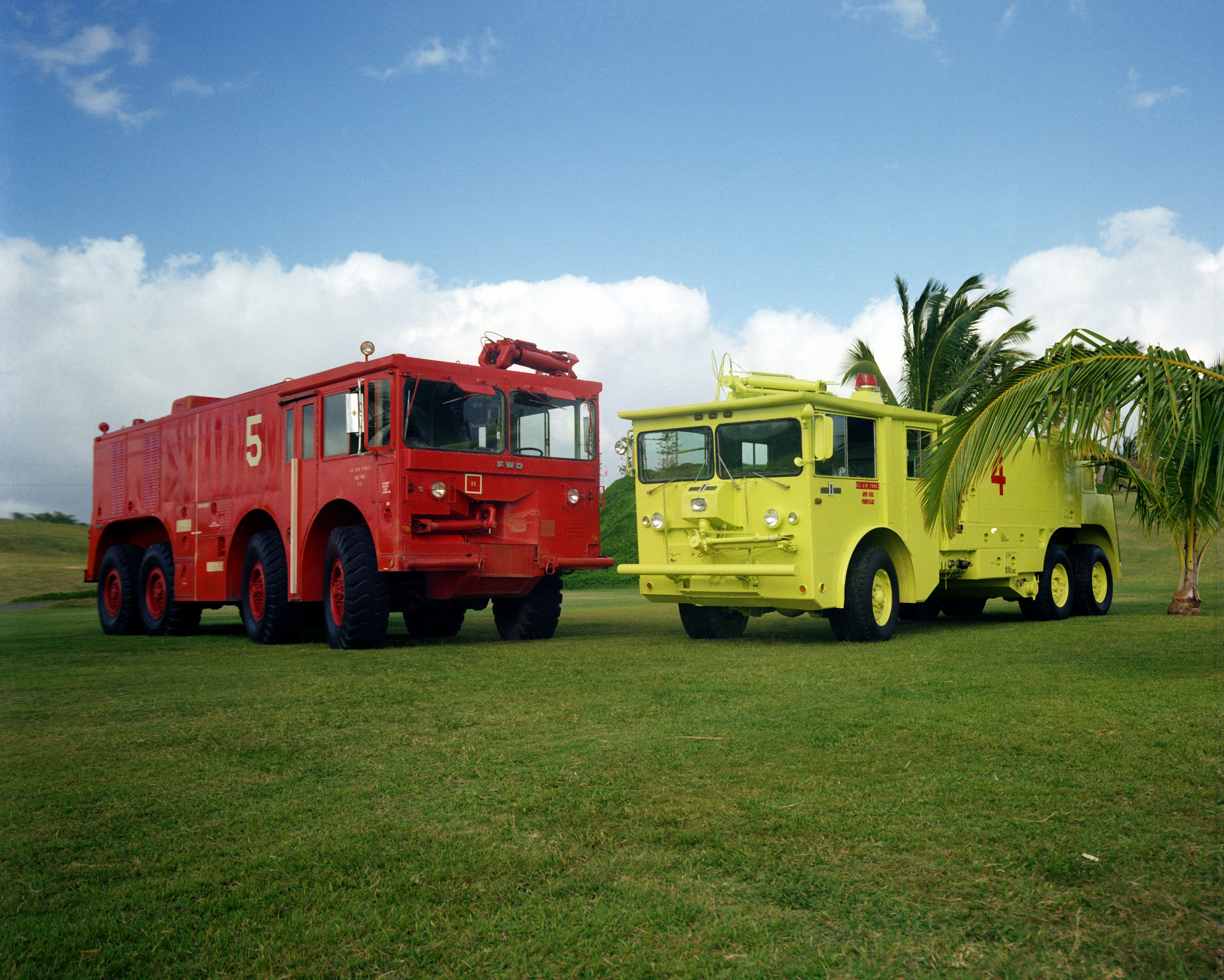
FWD Corp P-2 crash tender (left)

Randolph Lenz, chairman of FWD's parent company, Corsta Corp., became embroiled in a Federal Deposit Insurance Corporation suit, and in 2003 all assets of FWD, FWD Corporation, Seagrave, Baker Aerialscope, and Almonte Fire Trucks were sold to an investment group headed by former American LaFrance executive James Hebe. Today, the Seagrave Fire Apparatus group is a flagship company of ELB Capital Management.

Year	Production	Model
1911		A
1912		A
1913		
1914	26	G, B
1915	552	G, B, M
1916	978	B
1917	2,035	B
1918	12,185	B
1919	9,556	B
1920	350	B
1921	121	B
1922	62	B
1923	34	B, Road builder
1924	119	B, Rd. builder
1925	159	B, Rd. builder
1926		B, BF, BU, BD, BFU, BFD, M, MF, MFD, H
1927		B, BF, BU, BD, BFU, BFD, M, MF, MFD, H
1928		H, B, BF, Utility, BD, BFU, BFD, M, MF, MFD, MU, H
1929		
1930		
1931		
1932		
1933		
1934		
1935		
1939		
1941		
1945		
1946	1,644	
1947	2,103	
1948	1,009	
1949	505	
1950	713	
1951	2,197	
1952	2,902	
1953	2,425	
1954	857	
1955	1,011	
1956	1,645	
1957	1,073	
1958	1,227	
1959	1,067	
1960	881	
1967		
1968		
1970		
1985		
1986		

Data from List of American truck manufacturers

== See also ==
- G-numbers (SNL G174)
- Luella Bates (first licensed woman truck driver employed by the Four Wheel Drive Auto Co. 1918–1922)
