= AEC 850 =

R.6.T / R/6/T / AEC 850
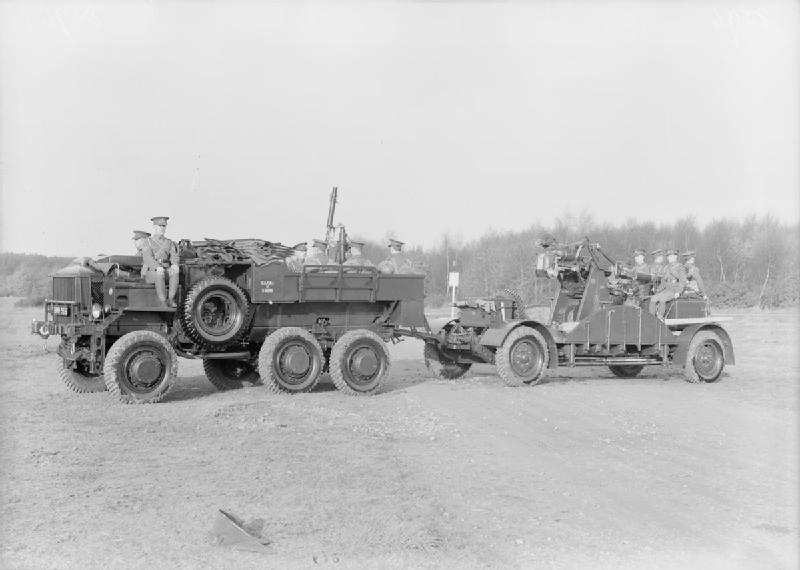
- AEC 850 with 3 inch anti-aircraft gun
- Type: Artillery tractor
- Place of origin: United Kingdom

Service history
- In service: 1932 - 1940
- Used by: British Army
- Wars: World War II

Production history
- Designer: FWD England
- Designed: 1927
- Manufacturer: FWD / AEC
- Unit cost: £2,443 15s
- Produced: 1927–1936
- No. built: 58
- Variants: Artillery tractor, Recovery vehicle

Specifications
- Mass: 8,840 kg (8.7 long tons)
- Length: 231.1 in (5.87 m)
- Width: 90.2 in (2.29 m)
- Height: 103.9 in (2.64 m)
- Crew: 2
- Passengers: 8
- Engine: AEC A136, six-cylinder petrol engine 95 brake horsepower (71 kW) at rpm
- Drive: 6×6
- Transmission: 4-speed constant-mesh gearbox, 2-speed transfer box
- Fuel capacity: 48 gallons
- Operational range: 164 miles
- Maximum speed: 30 miles per hour (48 km/h)

The FWD R.6.T, later and more widely known as the AEC 850, was a British 6×6 military vehicle of the interwar period that was used in the early part of World War Two.

== Development ==
=== FWD ===
The R.6.T began as an artillery tractor developed by the British Four Wheel Drive Lorry Company (FWD England) of Slough.

FWD began in 1921 as a British subsidiary of the US Four Wheel Drive Auto Company, refurbishing and reselling war-surplus FWD Model B trucks, nearly three thousand of which had been purchased by the British Army during the First World War. Thousands more had been purchased by the US Army, but these were mostly redistributed within the US. By 1926 the British operation was increasingly independent and began to produce new designs. The directors were Henry Nyberg, an American from FWD, and Charles Cleaver a pre-war designer of bus chassis with the London General Omnibus Company (LGOC), later AEC. The AEC connection would become an increasing aspect of the FWD company.

From 1924 FWD also traded as Hardy Rail Motors, seeking railway applications for the FWD chassis as a light shunting locomotive or railcar. In 1931, this would lead to Cleaver and AEC's involvement with the highly successful GWR diesel railcars. As Hardy Motors Ltd. from the end of 1930 to the absorption of FWD by AEC in 1932 this was also a brand used to sell a range of all-wheel-drive lorry chassis based on AEC parts and assembled by FWD in Slough.

=== Design ===
In 1927 the War Office issued Specification No. 30 for a 'Medium' subsidy-type lorry. The 'subsidy' scheme was to encourage the building of civilian vehicles that were built to be rugged enough to be useful in time of war. A subsidy was offered to offset their additional building cost and so that they could be commandeered if needed.

Six-wheel drive chassis would remain rare and were almost unknown at this time. FWD themselves had experience with four-wheel drive chassis during the First World War with their Model B chassis. A handful of all-wheel drive chassis were produced around this time, but they were often eight-wheel drive and extremely complicated, intended for ultimate wilderness performance, even at the cost of great complexity. The more popular route to off-road performance in a production lorry chassis was the 6×4, with two driven rear axles and an unpowered front steering axle. (Note: The Scammell Pioneer that superseded the R6T would be perhaps the best-known of these during WWII, but the Diamond T Model 980 and the Morris CDSW were also built in large numbers.) With six wheels, the off-road performance often relied on articulation between the axles, so as to keep all the wheels in contact with uneven ground. A standard lorry chassis with live axles suspended by semi-elliptic leaf springs was inadequate for military use, at least as a recovery vehicle.

==== The R.46 prototype ====
To encourage development, the 1927 War Office Specification offered free use of a patent suspension design developed by Lt Col H. Niblett (1882–1969), then the professor of mechanical engineering at the RASC training college, Aldershot. (Note: In 1929 Garner built a single 6×4 lorry, their WDL 6, using Niblett's suspension design. It is now part of the Science Museum collection.) This gave increased and independent articulation to the two rear axles. A pair of semi-elliptic leaf springs on each side were mounted lengthwise on the chassis, cambered downwards. The axles were attached to the ends of both of the paired springs, with each suspended by what were effectively two quarter-elliptic springs, in what was a relatively conventional design. However the paired springs were also allowed to pivot around their centres, allowing this to act as a bogie suspension. This suspension allowed each wheel up to 20" of suspension travel, independent of the other axle, and also the axles to pivot sideways by up to 18°. Despite this, it was a mechanically simple system and used standard live axles, with a rigid axle casing containing the half shafts, and required no additional universal joints.

The R.46 was FWD's first six-wheel drive vehicle. It used a simple ladder chassis similar to the Model B, with the same front end and front axle, but lengthened and fitted with the Nibblett rear axles. Two flat, straight chassis rails formed a simple flat platform. Unlike many contemporary chassis, these rails were neither tapered nor curved to improve clearances. The engine was a Wisconsin Model-A four-cylinder T-head of 389 cubic inches (6.4 l) producing 50 bhp. The wheels, once solid-tyred on the Model B, now benefitted from Goodyear low-pressure 'balloon' 40×8 inch pneumatic tyres, (Note: For pre-war crossply tyres, the size would be given as the overall diameter in inches and the sectional height of the tyre. The wheel rim for these would be $40 - (8 \times 2) \Rightarrow 24$ inches in diameter.) with a diamond tread pattern.

Before the R.46, FWD had also produced a half-track lorry, using a tracked rear bogie supplied by Roadless Traction of Hounslow. The R.46 may have been a derivative of this vehicle, with the tracked bogie replaced by the Niblett axles. This half-track was tested as an artillery tractor by MWEE at Farnborough between either 1927 or 1929, but its speed of 14 mph was considered to be too slow. The R.46, at the same engine speed, was capable of 25 mph. The R.46 prototype did well in War Office trials and FWD were encouraged enough to offer it for civilian sale. They offered it in three versions: the R.46 DH, as built, the DL with the engine offset to one side and the driver alongside, (Note: This layout was used by a number of manufacturers, in order to offer the longest possible loadbed for the same chassis.) and the DB, with the engine ahead of the driver and beneath a conventional bonnet. No R.46 of any type appear to have been sold.

==== The R.6.T prototype ====
In 1928 the War Office issued a contract, V.1806, for the supply of a prototype six-wheel drive artillery tractor. Those invited included other English companies such as Guy Motors, Leyland and Scammell.

This was to be a six-ton (Note: A nominal carrying capacity. Light military trucks of this period were 15 cwt (3/4 ton) and 30 cwt (1 1/2 tons), or 3 tons for a large lorry.) six-wheel drive artillery tractor as a more powerful replacement for the Thornycroft Hathi. The vehicles had to be able to pull a trailer load of approximately 6 tons. It was intended to haul the heavier artillery pieces, which still had wooden artillery wheels without rubber tyres, or even rigid steel wheels.

FWD produced the R.6.T. This was tested by MWEE in 1929 and found to be quite successful.

The first prototype of 1929 had a Dorman JUL side-valve petrol engine of 6.6 litres and 78 bhp. This engine was of quite modern design for its period, with a bore/stroke ratio of 100 / 140 mm. (Note: This would be considered an undersquare or long-stroke engine, in order to give good torque characteristics.) The crankcase was a light alloy casting with the cylinder block and cylinder head each cast as single iron castings. The recently developed Ricardo 'turbulent head' design was used. As was typical for its era, the engine, gearbox and transfer case were assembled on a subframe which was then carried on the chassis by a three-point suspension. This allowed a relatively flexible chassis to move without disturbing the alignment of the powertrain.

The chassis now used in-line portal axles with distinctive large hubs housing epicyclic reduction gears. These hubs required a specific design of wheel rim with a large central opening, which would have made the availability of spares difficult in wartime conditions. The transmission gearbox had four gears, with an additional high and low range transfer box, available to all gears, and which controlled the drive to the front axle. When in high ratio the transfer box worked as a 6×4 and selecting low ratio also engaged drive to the front axle. The Niblett rear suspension remained the same but the front axle was redesigned to give better articulation. The springs were still attached at the rear but at the front they were able to slide up and down in two prominent vertical girder guides. The two front ends were connected by a transverse compensating beam that could pivot on the chassis at the centre. Articulation of the rear axles was so great, and the propeller shafts of the short chassis so short, that the articulation angles of the shafts could become excessive. To avoid this, the shafts were lengthened by passing over the top of the axles and entering the axle case and final drive by a set of drop gears behind the axle line.

The brakes were typical for the 1920s but would be considered rudimentary today, especially for what was then a heavy chassis. The foot brake worked a single band brake on a drum in the transmission and the hand brake worked drums on the four rear wheels. Neither system had any servo assistance yet, although the first vacuum servo systems had just been produced by Clayton Dewandre that year.

For the first time a winch was fitted. This was regarded as essential for an artillery tractor and its powerful capabilities were often remarked upon through the AEC 850's career. The winch had a horizontal drum behind the driver, with 350 feet of wire rope and a pull varying between 7.3 and 9.5 tons. (Note: Because there are multiple wraps of cable on the drum, the pulling force exerted increases as the cable is paid out and the effective diameter of the drum reduces.)

The prototype body was wooden with two spare wheels carried transversely between the body and the driver. Before the trials took place, a steel body replaced this and the wheels were now carried longitudinally on the sides. The first body style can be seen in some early photos.

=== Trials ===
From April 1929, the MWEE tested the R.6.T at Farnborough and on manoeuvres at Bovington Camp in Dorset. Over nearly 1,800 miles of testing, both on-road and off-road, an average fuel consumption of 3.06 mpg was achieved. Average road speeds unladen were just over 30 mph and both off-road speeds and road speeds when towing an AA gun were half this.

The brakes fitted were the foot transmission brake and rear drum handbrake. Neither of these were capable of holding the loading vehicle on the 1 in 6 test hill, which was not unusual for lorry brakes of this era. The winch though was considered to be very effective; vehicles up to 9 tons were recovered from a bog and towed artillery loads such as a 60-pounder and limber could be winched up a 1 in 2.3 hill.

In the November of this year, comparative tests were made between the R.6.T, a Scammell Pioneer and a 4×4 Thornycroft Hathi. The Scammell and the R.6.T were of around the same weight, the older Hathi was lighter but all were given the same test loads of 1 ton on board and a towed 3 inch gun of 6 tons. The Hathi suffered an engine failure and was not tested. The Scammell had Goodyear tyres with a more pronounced tread pattern, the R.6.T's Dunlop tyres had a relatively smooth tread that required the use of tyre chains on soft ground. (Note: These were still early days for the development of tread patterns and pneumatic tyres, especially for heavy vehicles and for off-road use.)

At the end of that year, the vehicle came back to the factory. FWD was given an order for nine vehicles, but some changes were necessary.

=== R/6/T ===
Vehicle tests continued in May 1930 at Farnborough, although the Dorman engine had now been replaced by an AEC A136. This overhead camshaft engine was of more modern design than the Dorman and was in production for AEC's buses. As well as the better gasflow from having overhead valves, the cylinder head was designed so that it could be removed and refitted without disturbing the valvetrain, allowing easier servicing of the pistons and crankshaft bearings. It now had a smaller displacement of 6.1 liters, but with 95 hp it had more power. The gearbox was also exchanged for an AEC version. The brakes were reworked so that the handbrake was now the transmission brake and the footbrake the rear drum brakes, with the assistance of a vacuum servo. Adjustments to the driver's cab and superstructure were also made, the most notable being the position of two crew members next to the engine slightly ahead of the driver. The cabin and cargo hold were open, but could be covered with a canvas roof. It was also fitted with some of the first 42×10.5 bar grip tyres.

The purpose of these tests was to cover a cross-country circuit including steep hills of 1 in 5 and 1 in 10, and to repeat it with increasing loads until performance began to falter. It was found that while towing an anti-aircraft gun and carrying its crew of eleven and their equipment there was an additional margin of 3 tons that could be used for carrying additional armour. Engine performance was impressive, but braking was insufficient.

The first 17 production vehicles were delivered in 1930 and 6 more in 1931 & 1932, making a total of 24 including the prototype. A further chassis was built for potential commercial sale and exhibited at the Commercial Motor show in November 1931, at a list price of £2,950. It was never sold and was dismantled in 1935.

=== AEC and the move to Southall ===
In October 1929 FWD and AEC entered into a partnership as Four Wheel Drive Motors Ltd. and the earlier Four Wheel Drive Lorry Company Ltd. was wound up. 51% of the share capital, i.e. a controlling interest, was subscribed by AEC's parent, the Underground Electric Railways Company of London (UERL).

By the end of 1931, FWD had made a loss over the last 17 months and at the instigation of Charles Reeve, managing director of AEC, it was decided to close down manufacturing in Slough. The R/6/T was still considered viable and there was some thought of selling the UK rights to the FWD name back to the US company, so the company was not wound up. Instead AEC was to take over manufacture of the viable FWD products, at their plant in Southall. The Slough site and London offices were closed, some useful equipment moved to Southall and the remainder was sold off.

==== AEC 850 ====
The type designation of the vehicles changed from R/6/T to the AEC 850.

The chassis were built by AEC but bodies were now built by outside contractors, as was commonplace at the time. These included the coachbuilders Medley, Brooker & Smith of Acton and Duple. The chassis was priced separately from the body, at £2,135 for the six built in 1935 with bodies at £145 and £165 for breakdown and anti-aircraft tractors. By the final batch in 1936 this had risen to £2,283 15s and £160 for either body.

A total of one R.6.T, 23 R/6/T had been built by FWD in Slough and 33 AEC 850 were built at the AEC factory in Southall between 1932 and 1936. A further R/6/T was built as a chassis for the 1931 show, but later dismantled. This brought total production to 58. (Note: Ware gives a total production of 57, presumably excluding the show chassis) One of the Southall examples was built for the Royal Laval Transport Company, all the others are thought to have been for the War Office.

==== 1931 tests ====
In April 1931 MWEE carried out a further series of cross-manufacturer tests at Bala in North Wales, this time with the AEC-engined R/6/T. The tests over a 158-mile test route were repeated in July with a new A141 engine with its bore enlarged from the A136's 100 mm to 110 mm and increased power of 110 bhp. With a fuel consumption of 3.4 mpg, the 48 gallon petrol tank gave a range of 164 miles, barely sufficient for the test route.

Another R/6/T, HX 6114, was fitted with the new AEC A155 oil engine (diesel engine) instead of the petrol engine and tested over the same route. This can be identified in photographs by the large Autovac fuel lifter fastened to the front scuttle. The A155 was a new engine, as were all high-speed diesel engines at this time, and was under test in the Summer of 1930 in a number of AEC bus and coach chassis. Performance was slightly reduced, to the level of the earlier A136 and the all-up weight increased by half a ton, although this was mostly a reduction in the less-important maximum speed and the average speed over the course could still be maintained. Fuel economy improved from 3.4 to 5 mpg, and this was with a fuel which only cost a third of petrol.

In 1932, the same vehicle was used to test later oil engine models; the A161 and then in 1934 the A165. The main difference was that the A155 used the Bosch Acro air-cell system with a pre-combustion chamber in the piston crown and the A161 used early versions of the Ricardo Comet system in the cylinder head.

==== R.68 ====
The R.68 was a civilian commercial contemporary for the R.6.T and it too was developed from the R.46. It was a six-wheel drive lorry with a capacity of 8 tons, rather than being mostly intended as a tractor. The overall wheelbase was lengthed to 14 ft 9 in (4.50 m) from 12 ft (3.7 m) and the body's loadbed was now 18 ft (5.5 m) long inside. To control costs, more standard AEC parts were used and there was no winch. The AEC engine of the R/6/T was used together with AEC gearbox and axle final drives. The FWD transfer box was retained but the portal axles were replaced by conventional axles. The wheels were now smaller, not needing space for the hub reduction gears, and carried 38×9 tyres. The price in 1931 was reduced by nearly a third from the R/6/T to £1,885.

A single chassis was constructed and exhibited in Olympia at the end of 1929. It was tested by the Great Western Railway but eventually sold to the Griffin Engineering Company of Johannesburg. Griffin were well known in South Africa as importers and agents for a range of British engineering products, including Sentinel steam waggons, and may have been considering a similar import arrangement for FWD products.

== Adoption into service ==
=== British Expeditionary Force and the Fall of France ===
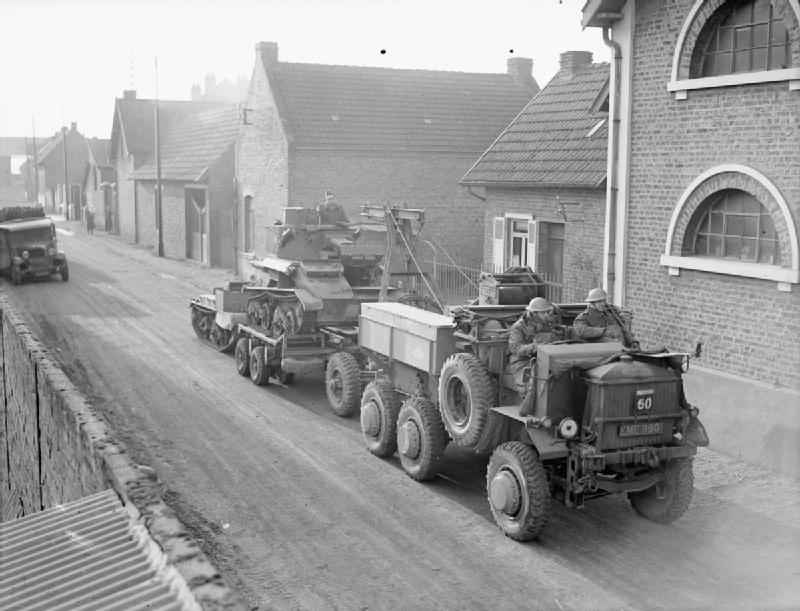
AEC 850 hauling a train of vehicles: a two-wheeled dolly, a Light Tank Mk VI on board a trailer, then a Bren Carrier, December 1939

At the outbreak of the Second World War in 1939, a number of vehicles were sent to France with the British Expeditionary Force (BEF).

The main version used in France was the recovery tractor, mostly being used as a tank transporter hauling a Tasker trailer. The trailer had eight wheels, grouped centrally in two pairs on each side. It was usually hauled by an AEC 850 and an intermediate two-wheeled dolly or limber, carrying the drawbar.

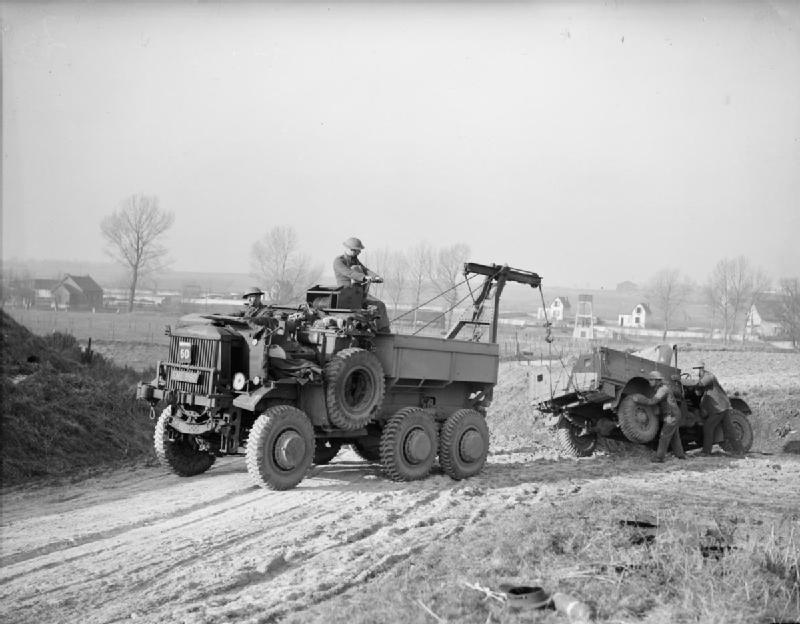
A Morris 15cwt truck being recovered by an AEC 850

Most examples were left behind during the evacuation of the BEF from Dunkirk at the end of May 1940.

=== Desert service ===
At least one of the early recovery tractors with the tubular jib was photographed on a dockside at Alexandria, Egypt in October 1940. It was engaged in unloading materiel from MV Denbighshire, which had arrived as part of a convoy as Operation Apology.

== Preservation ==
One artillery tractor, AMP 80, survives and has been preserved. It was on display at the Imperial War Museum in Duxford, but is now in a private collection. This is one of the AEC Southall-built examples of the last batch, and was fully restored in 1970.

Another example, BMM 590, survives with a post-war recovery conversion and new crane jib, a diesel engine and an enclosed cab.

Two other chassis survived unrestored and were at the REME museum until around 2013, but have since disappeared.

== See also ==
Artillery tractors carrying out the same role

- Scammell Pioneer
- AEC Matador

== Bibliography ==
- Baxter, Brian (1989). Breakdown : a history of recovery vehicles in the British Army. HMSO, for the REME Museum. pp. 16–17. ISBN 0112904564.
- Fletcher, David (1998). British Military Transport. HMSO, for The Tank Museum. ISBN 0-11-290570-6.
- Freathy, Les (2012). British Military Trucks of World War Two. Erlangen: Tankograd Publishing. pp. 167–168. ISBN 978-3-936519-29-7.
- Thackray, Brian (2012). "8 The FWD R6T and AEC Type 850". The AEC Story – From the Regent to the Monarch. Stroud: Amberley Publishing. pp. 83–94. ISBN 9781445603902.
- Ventham, Philip; Fletcher, David (1990). Moving the Guns. HMSO. ISBN 0-11-290477-7.
- Ware, Pat (2010). The Illustrated Guide to Military Vehicles. London: Hermes House. p. 204. ISBN 978-1846815850.
