= TACR2 (Range Rover) =

Rapid response vehicle used by the Royal Air Force and the Royal Navy

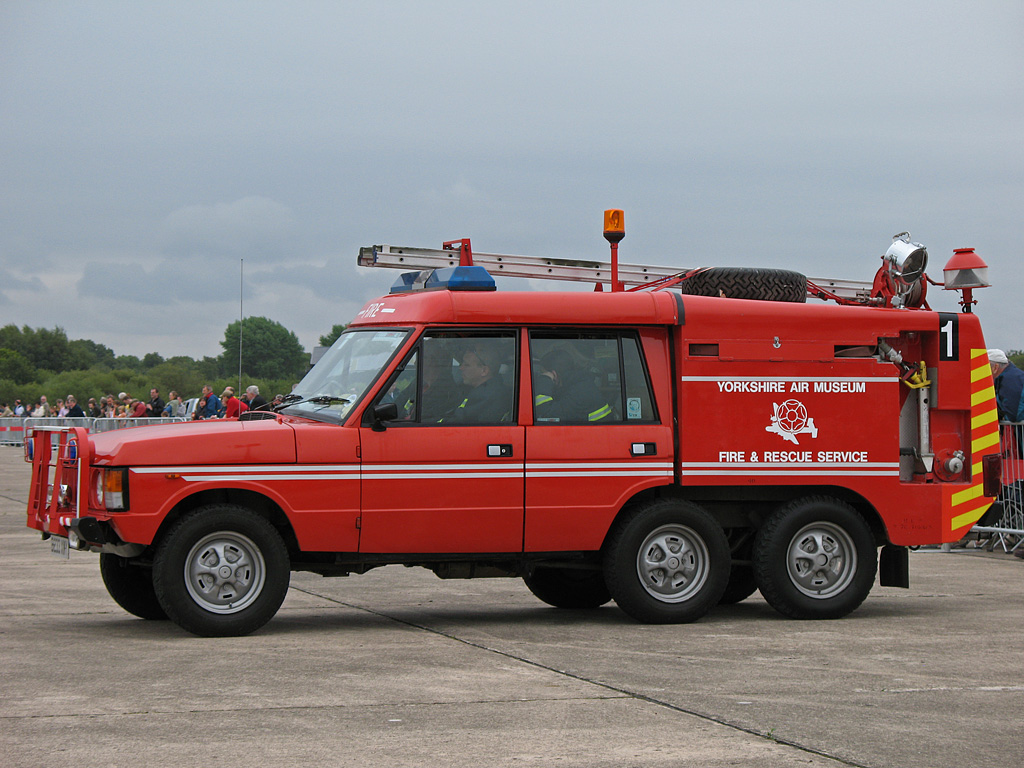
Yorkshire Air Museum TACR2 at RAF Elvington.

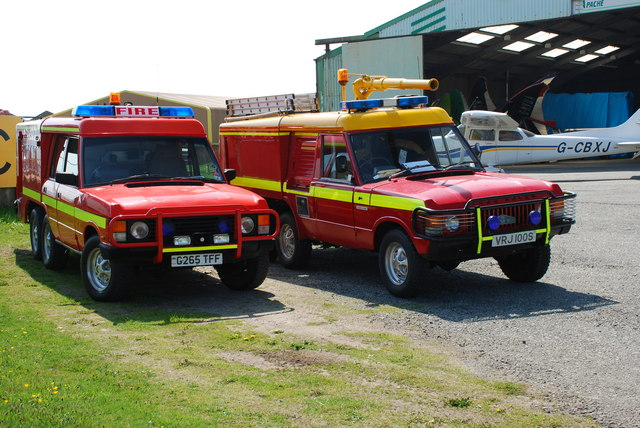
Two Range Rover-based fire tenders at Caernarfon Airport.

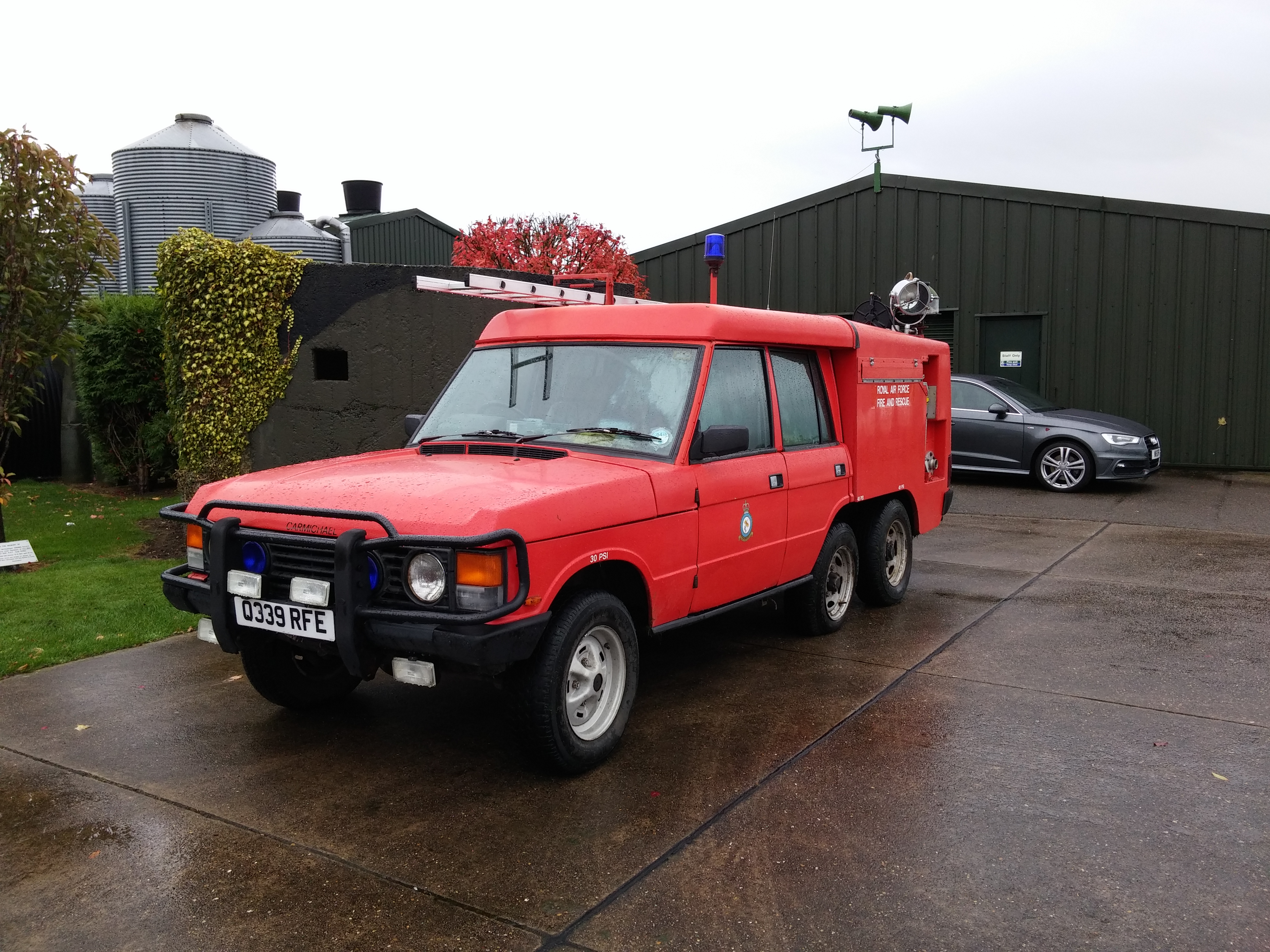
Lincolnshire Aviation Heritage Centre - fire tender.

The Truck Airfield Crash Rescue Mk.2, 6×4 2 tonne Range Rover, commonly abbreviated TACR2, is a military airfield fire-fighting rapid-response intervention vehicle (RRV), used at military airports and aerodromes of the Royal Air Force (RAF) and the Royal Navy (RN).

The TACR2 is a six-wheeled Range Rover-based successor to the earlier four-wheeled TACR1 (Truck Airfield Crash Rescue Mk.1) which was built on a Land Rover Series II.

The TACR2 was built on the Carmichael Commando chassis. This is a 775 millimetres (30.5 inches) third rear axle extension of the classic Range Rover. It uses the standard Range Rover powertrain; the original 3.5 litres (214 cubic inches) V8 petrol engine fuelled by two SU carburettors, five-speed manual transmission linked to a permanent four wheel drive transfer case (with a cabin-operated pneumatic centre differential lock), with torque output sent to the front axle and original rear axle via conventional Cardan propeller shafts. The rearmost additional third rear axle is unpowered, using identical coil spring suspension as the original live rear axle. Braking was provided by standard Range Rover disc brakes on all (six) wheels with AP dual-opposed piston calipers, fitted with updated brake pads. The chassis was converted by Carmichael from a standard Range Rover supplied directly from the Land Rover factory in the form of a drivable chassis cab, therefore most components were standard Range Rover. Later TACR2 versions (TACR2a) were supplied with an updated 3.9 litres (238 cubic inches) V8 petrol engine utilising mechanical multipoint fuel injection.

Following the retirement of the TACR2 from British military service, and their subsequent sale to private owners, some TACR2s have been converted to six wheel drive. This is usually achieved by welding an input cone mounting flange to the rear of the middle axle in place of the diff pan, attaching a second, rearward facing 'input' cone (as an output cone), linked by a short propeller shaft to the input cone of the rear axle, this and the diff and diff pan need to be turned over (so the crown wheel is on the opposite side to the middle axle's crown wheel) to maintain correct rotation. This should be used in conjunction with free wheeling hubs to prevent diff wind-up when driving on-road or tarmac.

TACR2 bodies and fire-fighting hardware were built by Carmichael, with others built by Gloster Saro (most), and a small number by HCB Angus.

TACR2 dimensions
length	5,245 metres	17 foot 2.5 inches
width	1,778 metres	5 foot 10 inches
height	2,324 metres	7 foot 7.5 inches
wheelbase	3,315 metres	10 foot 10.5 inches
wheelbase	^{+}0,775 metres	^{+}2 foot 6.5 inches
laden weight	4,090 kilograms (9,020 pounds)	

== See also ==
- Airport rescue and firefighting services in the United Kingdom
- Fire services in the United Kingdom
- Category:Aircraft fires
