= FWD Model B =

American 3-ton truck

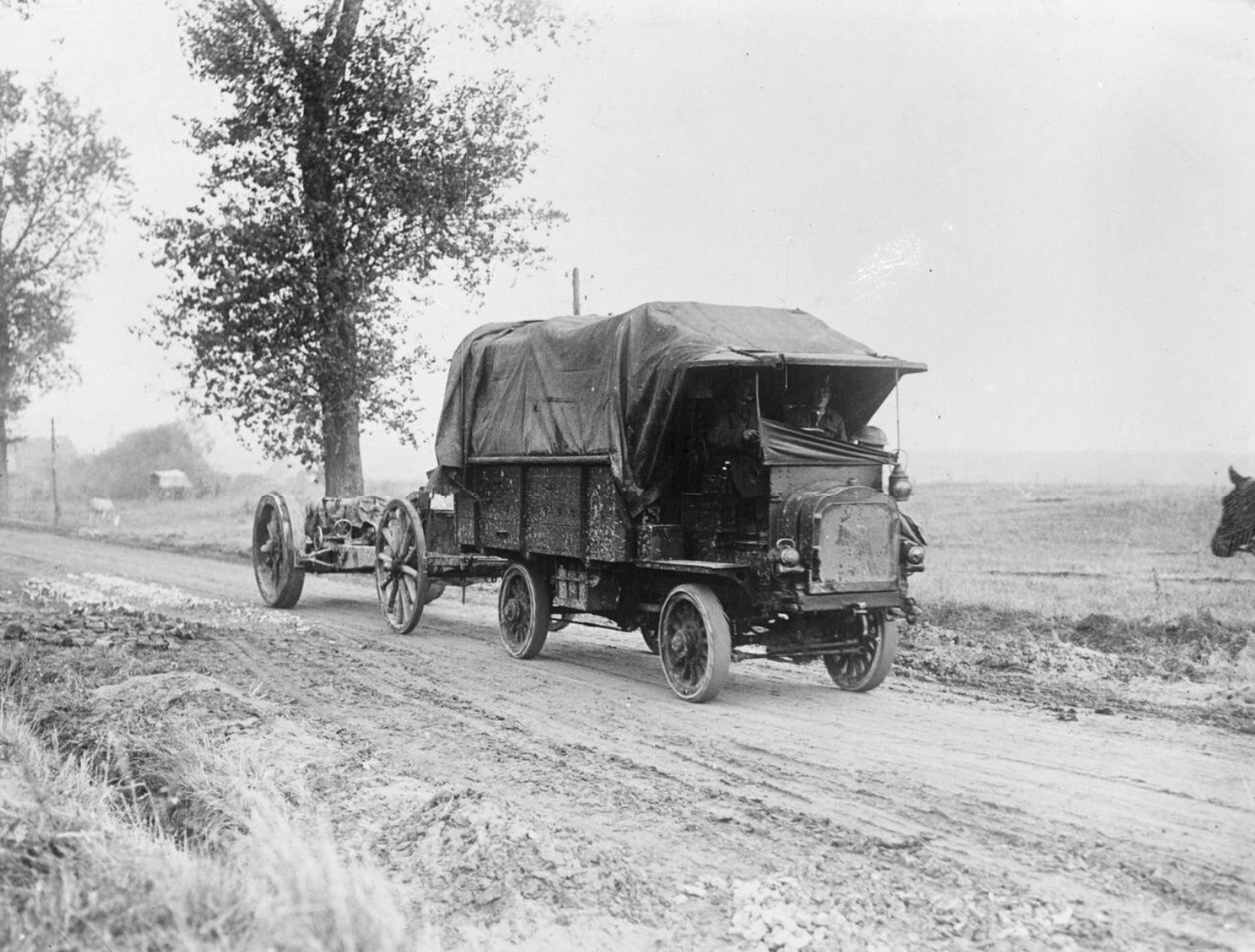
- British FWD lorry hauling a BL 6-inch 26 cwt howitzer
- Type: 3-ton truck
- Place of origin: United States

Service history
- Used by: United States; United Kingdom
- Wars: First World War; Pancho Villa Expedition

Production history
- Manufacturer: Four Wheel Drive Auto Company
- Produced: 1912–1919
- No. built: Over 16,000

Specifications
- Mass: 12,200 lb (5.5 t) unladen
- Length: 18 ft 6 in (5.64 m)
- Width: 6 ft 4 in (1.93 m)
- Height: 10 ft 6 in (3.20 m)
- Engine: 4-cylinder Wisconsin petrol 36 bhp (27 kW) at 1,800 rpm
- Payload capacity: 11,000 lb (5.0 t) on road 6,600 lb (3.0 t) cross county
- Drive: 4x4
- Transmission: 3F–1R
- Suspension: Live axles on semi-elliptic multi-leaf springs
- Maximum speed: 15 mph (24 km/h)
- References: Ware.

The FWD Model B was an American built four-wheel drive truck produced by the Four Wheel Drive Auto Company that saw widespread service with American and British forces during the First World War.

== Design ==
The FWD Model B was a cab over engine truck with full-time four wheel drive powered by a 389 cubic inch straight-four Wisconsin T-head engine that produced 36 bhp (27 kW) at 1,800 rpm. The chassis was constructed with a double ladder frame, with a short inner frame carrying the engine and driveline mounted within an outer frame that mounted the suspension and carried the cab and body. The drive was transmitted to each axle via a Cotta three-speed constant-mesh gearbox through a single speed silent chain transfer case with a lockable center differential. Braking was provided through all four wheels by an external contracting band operating on a flywheel on the back of the transmission. The transfer case was equipped with two differential locks to allow the vehicle to be driven in either front or rear drive mode in the event of a driveshaft failure.

Power was distributed by shafts to front and rear live axles. Steering was accomplished using FWD's patented double-Y constant velocity joints. The front wheels were mounted with significant camber to bring the tire contact patches as close as possible under the steering knuckle pivot point to reduce steering effort, resulting in a distinctive "pigeon toe" appearance. Another identifying feature was the two radius rods running from each differential to brackets on the frame near the transfer case to help keep the axles aligned. The Model B was originally provided with solid tyres on spoked or disk wheels. Many were converted to pneumatic tyres in the 1930s. Most were equipped with either a steel ammunition body or a wooden supply body, though some were fitted with a variety of specialty bodies including air compressor, artillery repair, artillery supply, baggage repair, spare parts, mobile office, power saw, balloon winch, water tanker, several types of machine shops and a searchlight.

== History ==
The Four Wheel Drive Auto Company of Clintonville, Wisconsin launched the Model B in 1912, initial production was very slow with only 18 produced in 1913. The US was the first nation to show interest in the military potential of the vehicle, with the US Army testing one of the earliest production vehicles.

The British Army became the first military customer on March 23, 1915, ordering 50 trucks to be delivered in only 40 days. An American export agency was set up with a reception base in Liverpool and a repair depot in Islington to check and service incoming vehicles before handing them over to the Ministry of Munitions. A total of 2,925 Model Bs were purchased by the British Army, 1,599 of these were used in France on the Western Front, predominantly for heavy haulage of artillery, ammunition, and pontoon bridge supplies.

The US Army first ordered the Model B in 1916, ordering 147 vehicles for the Pancho Villa Expedition into Mexico under the command of General John Pershing. Upon entry into the First World War in 1917, the US placed orders for 30,000 Model Bs as the "Truck, Three to Five Ton, M1917". 12,498 were delivered by the time of the Armistice, of which 9,420 went to France with the American Expeditionary Forces. Demand for the Model B was too great for the Four Wheel Drive Auto Company to meet, so the Peerless Motor Company, Kissel Motor Car Company, Premier Motor Corporation and Mitchell Motor Car Company were also engaged to build Model Bs. One Model B was assembled by Premier in Indianapolis using parts from all four manufacturers to demonstrate that all parts were truly interchangeable.

After the war the US government sold or distributed the majority of their Model Bs to local governments and municipalities. Three were included in the 1919 Motor Transport Corps convoy. According to 1st Lt. E. R. Jackson, the official Ordnance Department Observer: "The three (3) Four Wheel Drive Trucks were, in general, the most satisfactory in the Convoy and of all of the various makes represented, the F.W.D.'s alone were able to pull through all of the bad, muddy, and sandy stretches of road in Nebraska, Wyoming, Utah and Nevada absolutely unaided." (emphasis in the original.) He also noted that the Model B's were more reliable than the other vehicles and completed the entire trip on their original tires but they showed "a decided tendency to run into the bad spots" of uneven roads. British machines were returned to the UK from where some were shipped throughout British Empire.

Surplus Model Bs proved popular in the postwar Good Roads Movement as their all wheel drive made them ideal municipal and civilian construction vehicles, and FWD survived the postwar recession on the strength of Model B sales and parts. Popular sales tactics included demonstrating the benefits of all wheel drive by driving them up stairs. FWD also selected six woman demonstration drivers from their plant workforce to demonstrate the Model B's easy steering, the first of whom, Luella Bates, delivered a Model B from Clintonville to the 1919 New York Auto Show before barnstorming all around the U.S. on three transcontinental trips. Some Model B trucks were still being used as construction vehicles and snow ploughs as late as the 1940s.

== Gallery ==
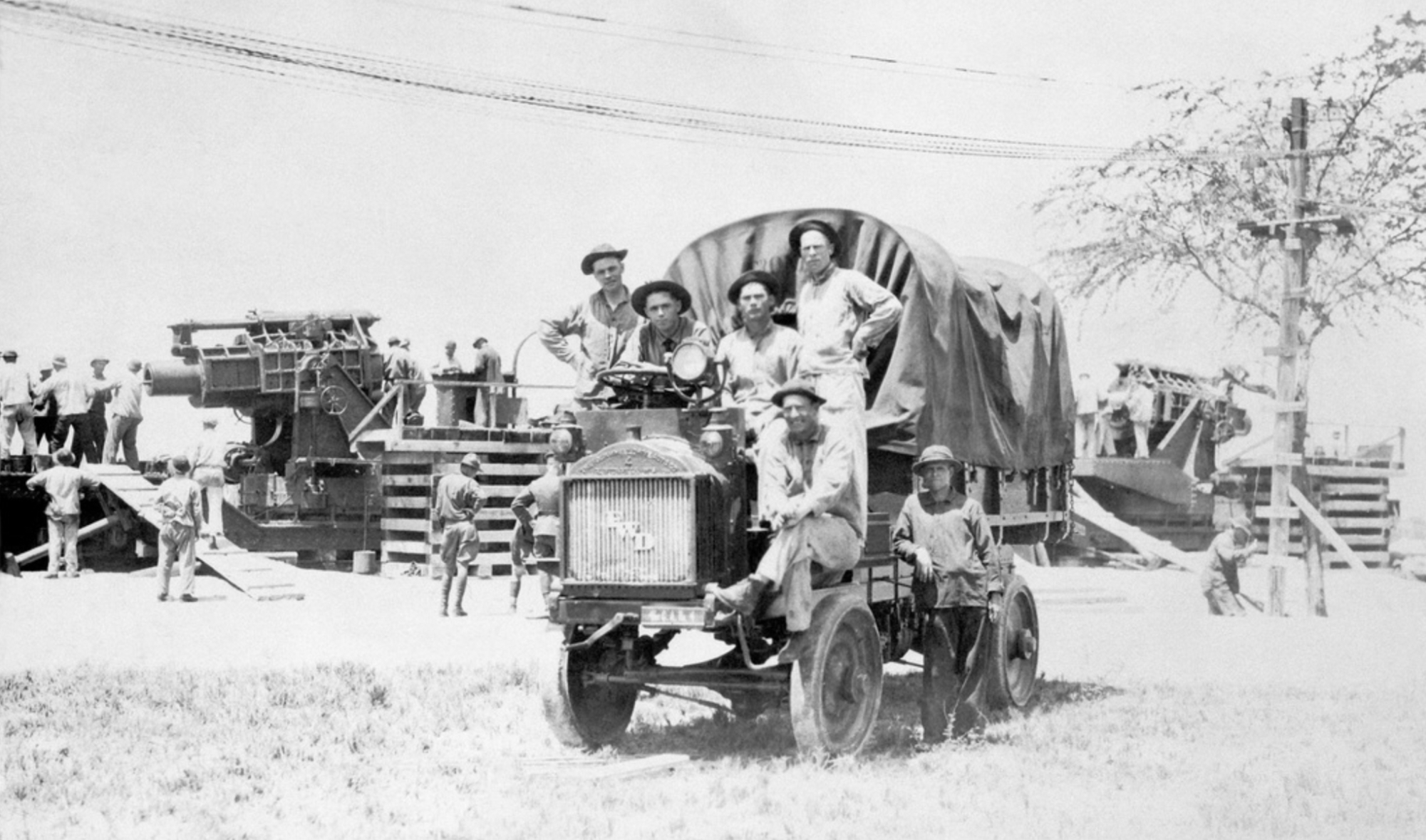

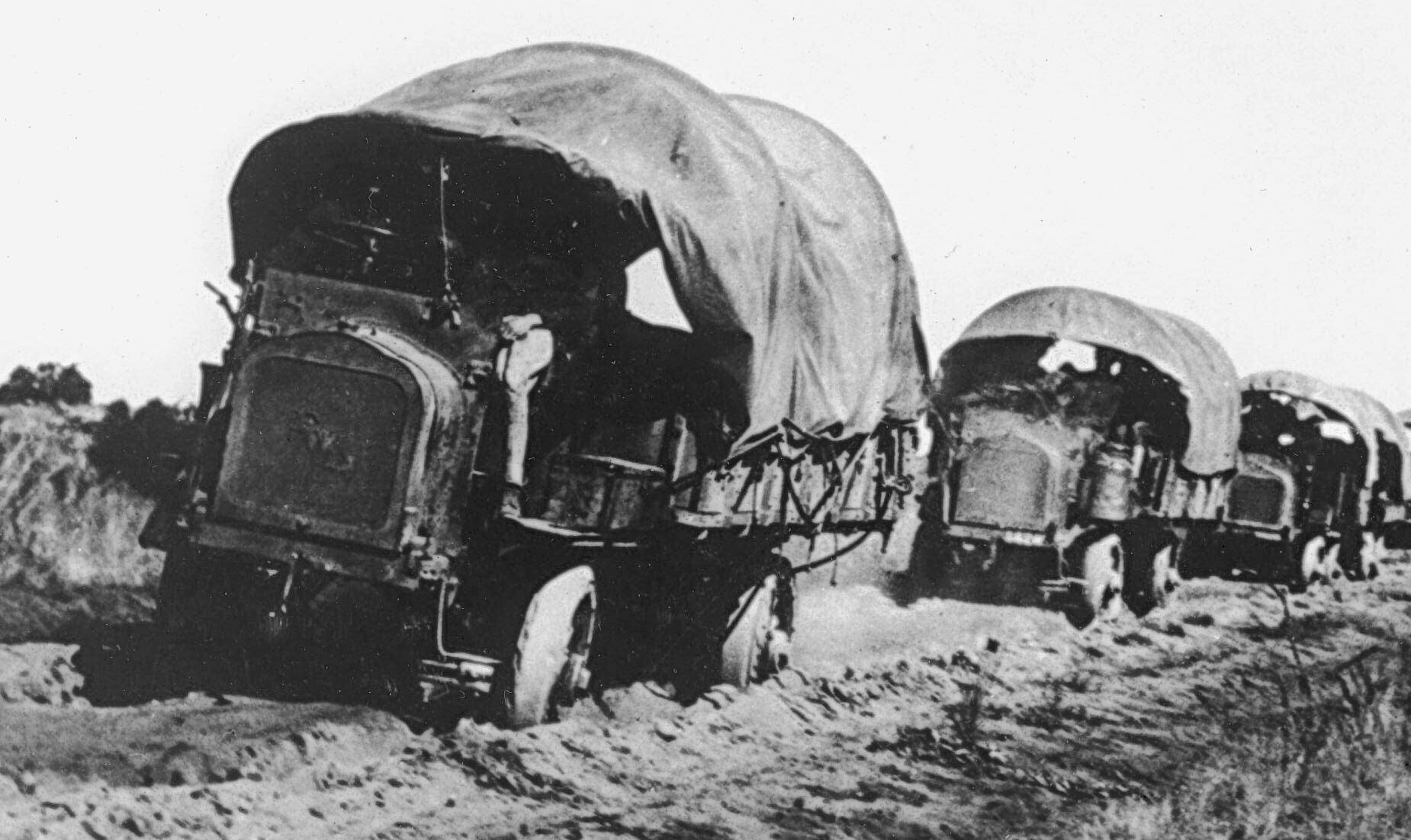

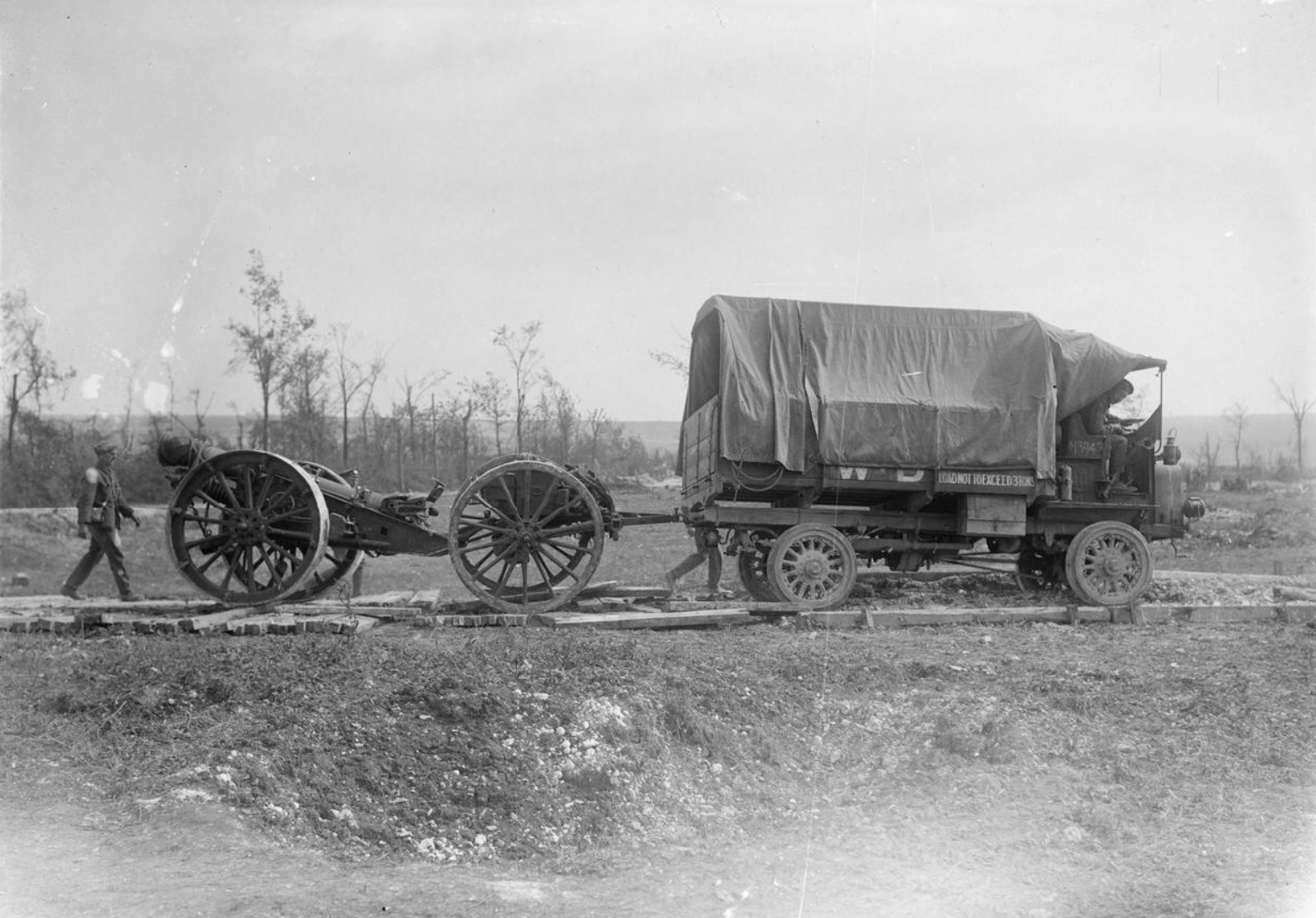

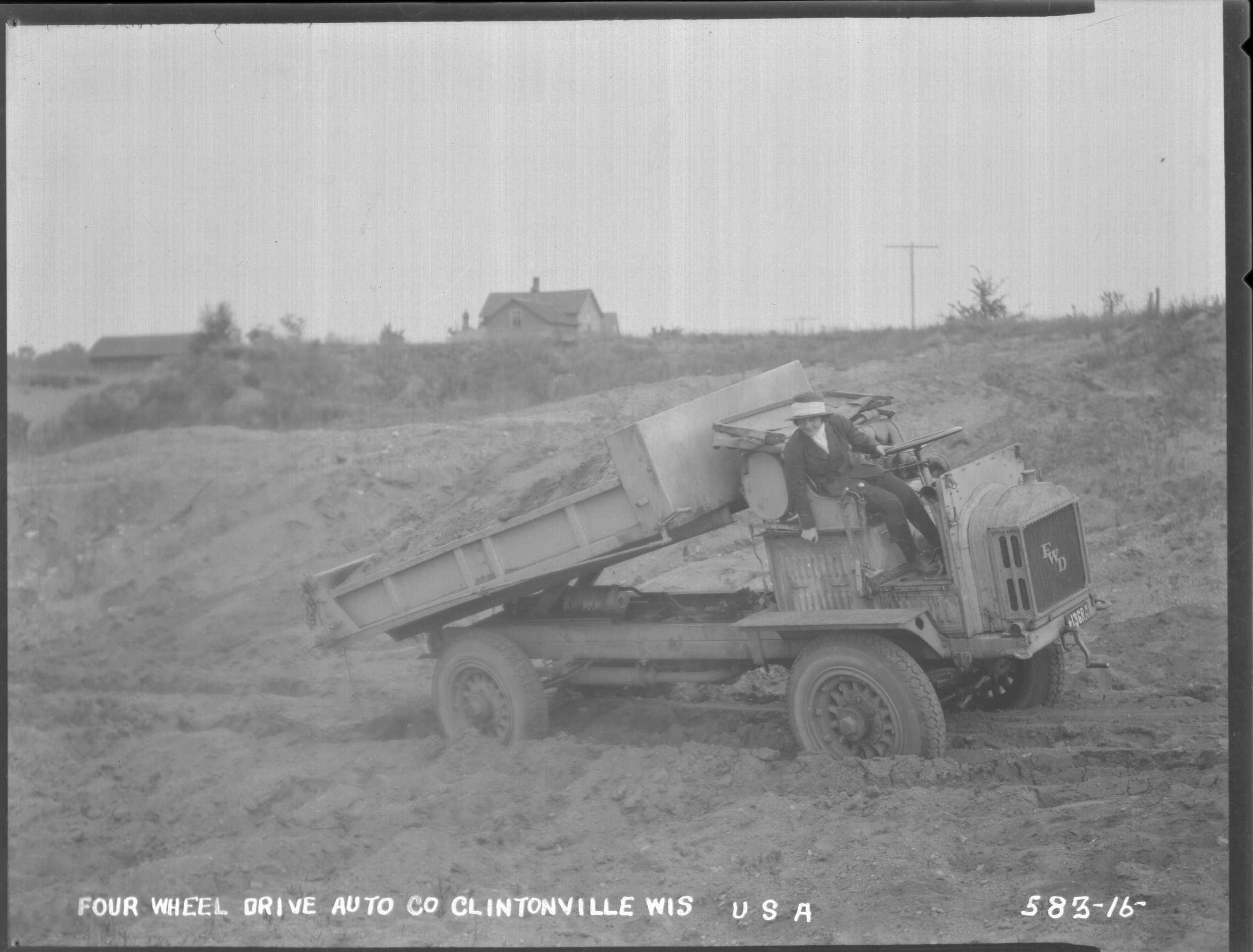

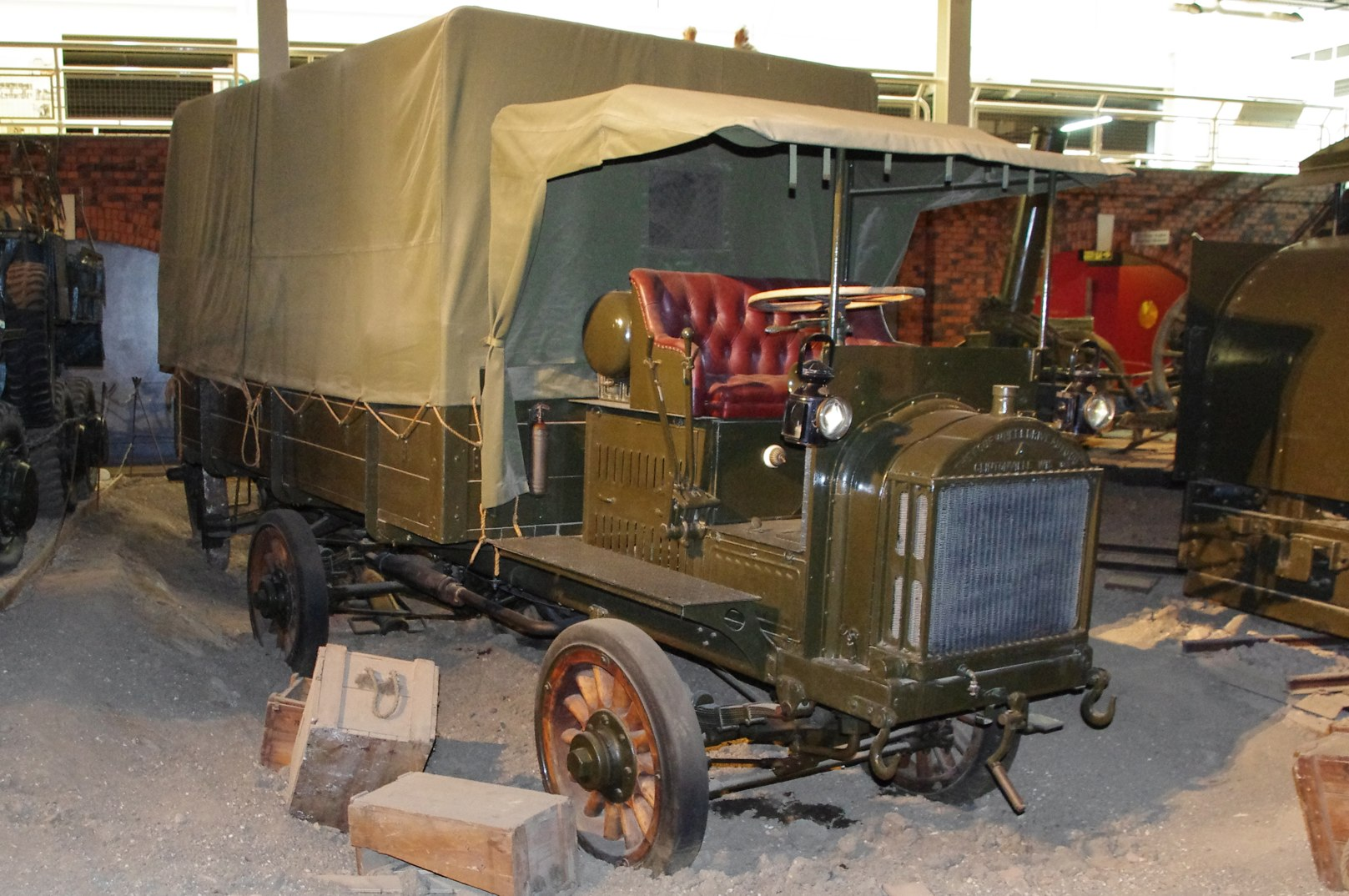
FWD Model ‘B’ 4x4 truck at the IWM Duxford

== See also ==
- AEC 850, a six wheel drive artillery tractor of the interwar period, developed by FWD UK Ltd.
