= Yorkshire Air Museum =

Yorkshire Air Museum & Allied Air Forces Memorial
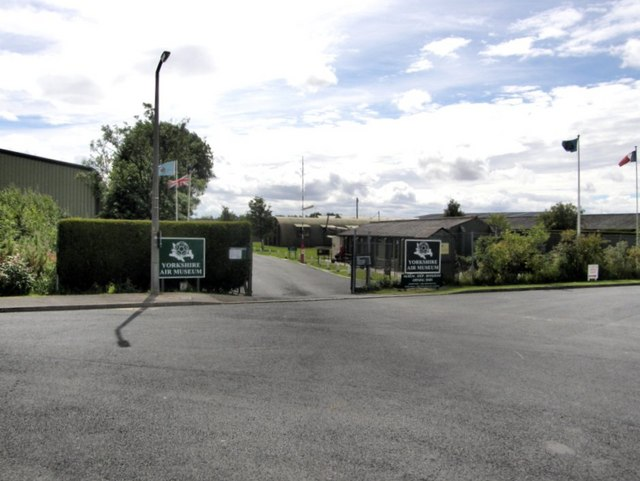
- Entrance to the Museum

- Location within North Yorkshire
- Established: 1986
- Location: Halifax Way, Elvington, York, YO41 4AU
- Coordinates: 53.9248°N 0.9653°W
- Type: Aviation museum
- Accreditation: Arts Council
- Founder: Rachel Semlyen
- Director: Jonathan Brewer
- Parking: On site
- Website: yorkshireairmuseum.org

The Yorkshire Air Museum & Allied Air Forces Memorial is an aviation museum in Elvington, York, England, on the site of the former RAF Elvington airfield, a Second World War RAF Bomber Command station. The museum was founded, and first opened to the public, in the mid 1980s.

The museum is one of the largest independent air museums in Britain. It is also the only Allied Air Forces Memorial in Europe. The museum is an accredited museum under Arts Council accreditation scheme. It is a member of Friends of the Few (Battle of Britain Memorial), the Royal Aeronautical Society, the Museums Association and the Association of Independent Museums.

The museum is a registered charity (No. 516766) dedicated to the history of aviation and was also set up as a memorial to all allied air forces personnel, particularly those who served in the Royal Air Force during the Second World War.

== Site ==
The 20-acre (81,000 m^{2}) parkland site includes buildings and hangars, some of which are listed. It incorporates a 7-acre (28,000 m^{2}) managed environment area and a DEFRA and Environment Agency supported self sustainability project called "Nature of Flight". The museum is situated next to a 10,000 ft (1.9 mi; 3.0 km) runway, which is privately owned.

=== History ===
While the Royal Air Force carried on using the runway for aircraft landing and take off training until 1992, the buildings and hangars had long been abandoned. In 1980, Rachel Semlyen approached the owners of "what was then an abandoned and derelict wartime site, with the idea of restoring the buildings and creating a museum". In 1983, a group started clearing the undergrowth and the site was ready to be unveiled as the Yorkshire Air Museum in 1986.

Jonathan Brewer became director in 2022.

The museum received a grant in 2026 from the National Lottery Heritage Fund to improve its collections management.

== Events ==
The museum undertakes several annual events each year within the general attraction / entertainment area as well as educational and academic events for specific audiences, plus several corporate events in association with companies such as Bentley, Porsche, banking, government agencies etc. The annual Allied Air Forces Memorial Day takes place in September.

== Exhibits ==
The museum has over 50 aircraft, which the development of aviation from 1853 up to the latest GR4 Tornado. Several aircraft including Victor, Nimrod, Buccaneer, Sea Devon, SE5a, Eastchurch Kitten, DC3 Dakota are kept live and operated on special "Thunder Days" during the year. Over 20 historic vehicles and a registered archive containing over 500,000 historic artefacts and documents are also preserved at the museum, which is also the official archive for the National Aircrew Association and National Air Gunners Association. It is nationally registered and accredited through DCMS/Arts Council England and is a registered charity.

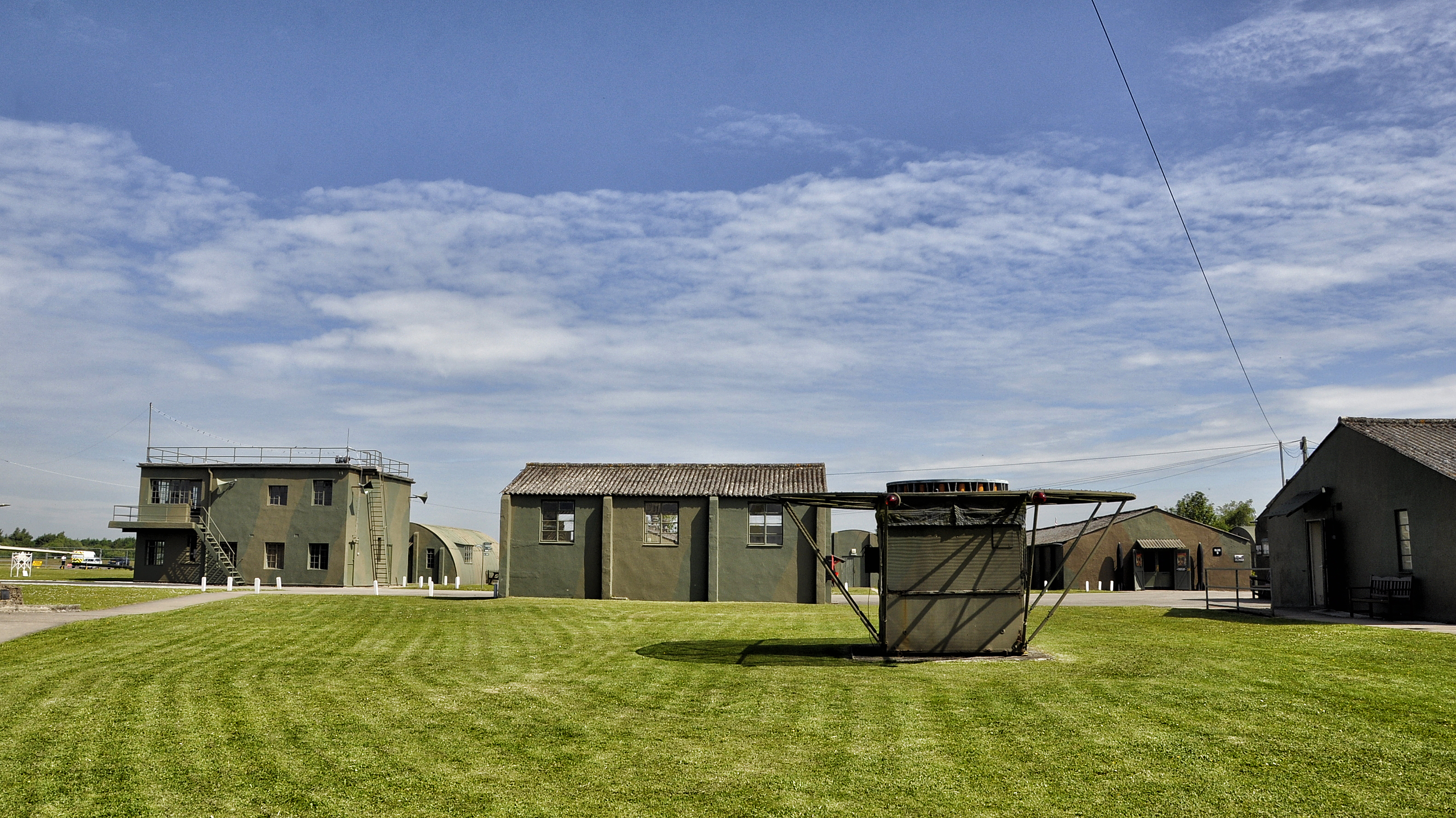
Buildings at the museum, the control tower is on the left

A permanent exhibition on RAF Bomber Command was opened at the museum by life member, Sir David Jason. In 2010, a new exhibition called "Pioneers of Aviation", and funded by the Heritage Lottery Fund, was opened featuring the lives and achievements of Sir George Cayley, Sir Barnes Wallis, Robert Blackburn, Nevil Shute and Amy Johnson.

Principal on-site businesses include: restaurant, retail shop, events, aircraft operation engineering workshops, archives and a corporate business suite. The museum is also a location for TV and film companies.

- Building 1 – Airborne Forces Display & No. 609 Squadron RAF Room
- Building 2 – Uniform Display
- Building 3 – Air Gunners' Exhibition
- Building 4 – Archives & Reference Library
- Building 5 – Museum Shop
- Building 7 – Memorial Garden
- Building 8 – Museum HQ, Main Entrance
- Building 9 – Against the Odds
- Building 10 – Elvington Corporate Room
- Building 11 – Museum NAAFI Restaurant
- Building 12 – Control Tower
- Building 13 – French Officers' Mess
- Building 14 – Airmens Billet and Station MT Display
- Building 15 – Royal Observer Corp
- Building 16 – Signal Square
- Building 17 – Hangar T2 Main Aircraft exhibition
- Building 18 – Archive & Collections Building
- Building 19 – Handley Page Aircraft Workshop
- Building 20 – Pioneer of Aviation Exhibition

== Collection ==
=== Aircraft on display ===
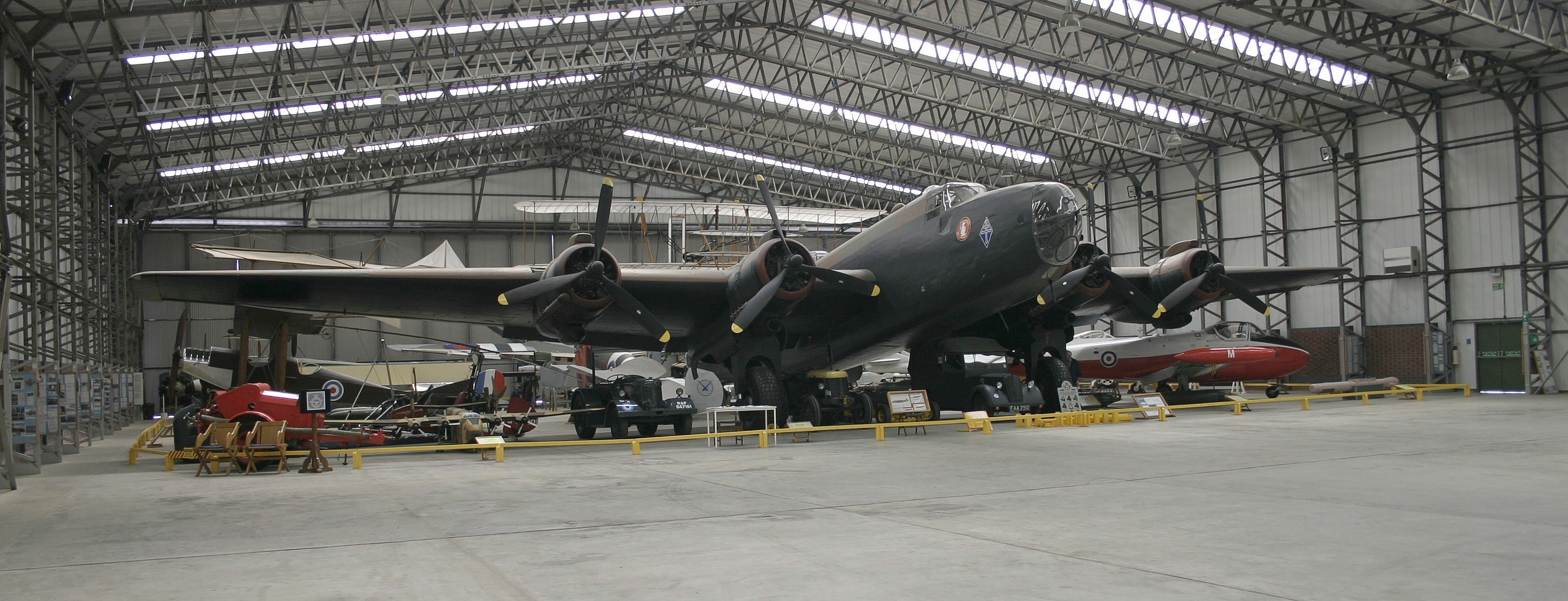
Handley Page Halifax painted as "Friday the 13th"

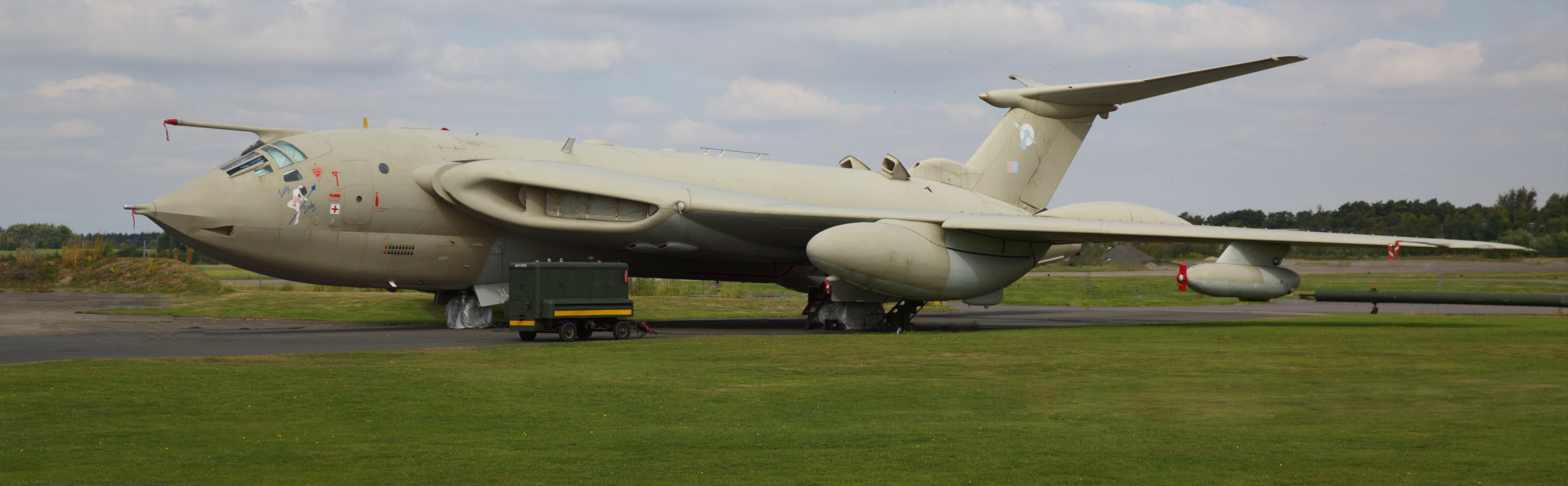
Handley Page Victor

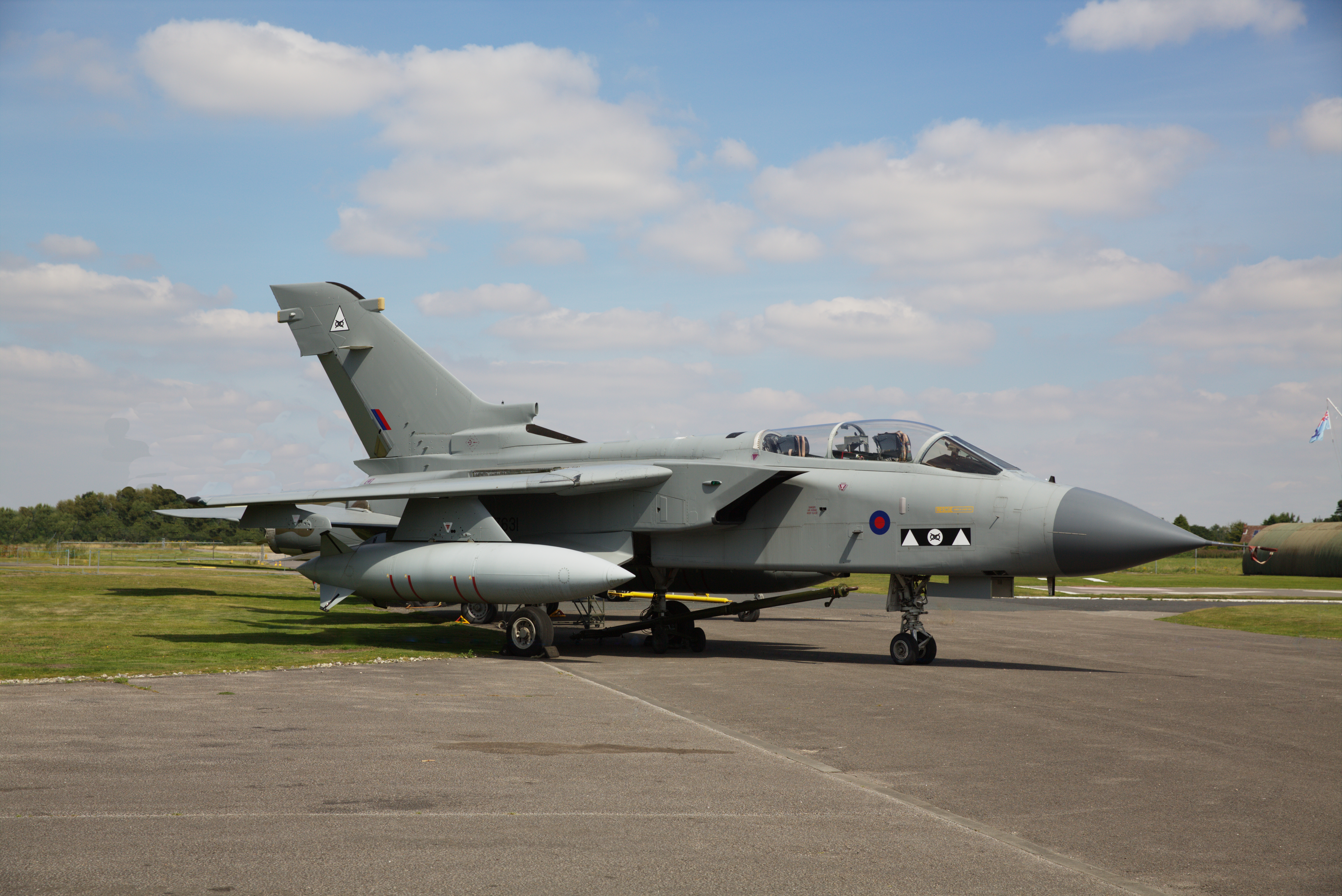
Panavia Tornado

Pre-World War II

- Avro 504K – Replica
- Blackburn Mercury – Replica
- Cayley Glider – Replica
- Mignet HM.14 Pou-du-Ciel
- Port Victoria P.V.8 Eastchurch Kitten Replica
- Royal Aircraft Factory BE.2c – Replica
- Royal Aircraft Factory SE.5a – Replica
- Wright Flyer – Replica

World War II

- Avro Anson T.21 VV901
- Douglas Dakota IV KN353
- Fairchild Argus II FK338
- Gloster Meteor F.8 WL168
- Gloster Meteor NF.14 WS788
- Handley Page Halifax III LV907
- Hawker Hurricane I – Replica
- Messerschmitt Bf 109 G-6 – Replica
- Slingsby T.7 Kirby Cadet RA854
- Supermarine Spitfire I – Replica
- Waco Hadrian 237123

Post World War II

- Air Command Commander Elite
- Beagle Terrier 2 TJ704
- Canadair CT-133 Silver Star 133417
- de Havilland Devon C.2 VP967
- de Havilland Vampire T.11 XH278
- Europa Prototype 001
- Mainair Demon
- Saunders-Roe Skeeter AOP.12 XM553
- Westland Dragonfly HR.5 WH991

Cold War

- BAC Jet Provost T.4 XP640
- Blackburn Buccaneer S.2 XN974
- Blackburn Buccaneer S.2B XX901
- British Aerospace Harrier GR.3 XV748
- British Aerospace Nimrod MR.2 XV250
- Dassault Mirage IIIE 538
- Dassault Mirage IVA 45/BR
- English Electric Canberra T.4 WH846
- English Electric Lightning F.6 XS903 which arrived during June 1988.
- Fairey Gannet AEW.3 XL502
- Gloster Javelin FAW.9 XH767
- Handley Page Victor K.2 XL231
- Hawker Hunter FGA.78 QA10
- Hawker Hunter T.7 XL572
- Panavia Tornado GR.1 ZA354
- Panavia Tornado GR.4 XZ631

=== Ground vehicles ===
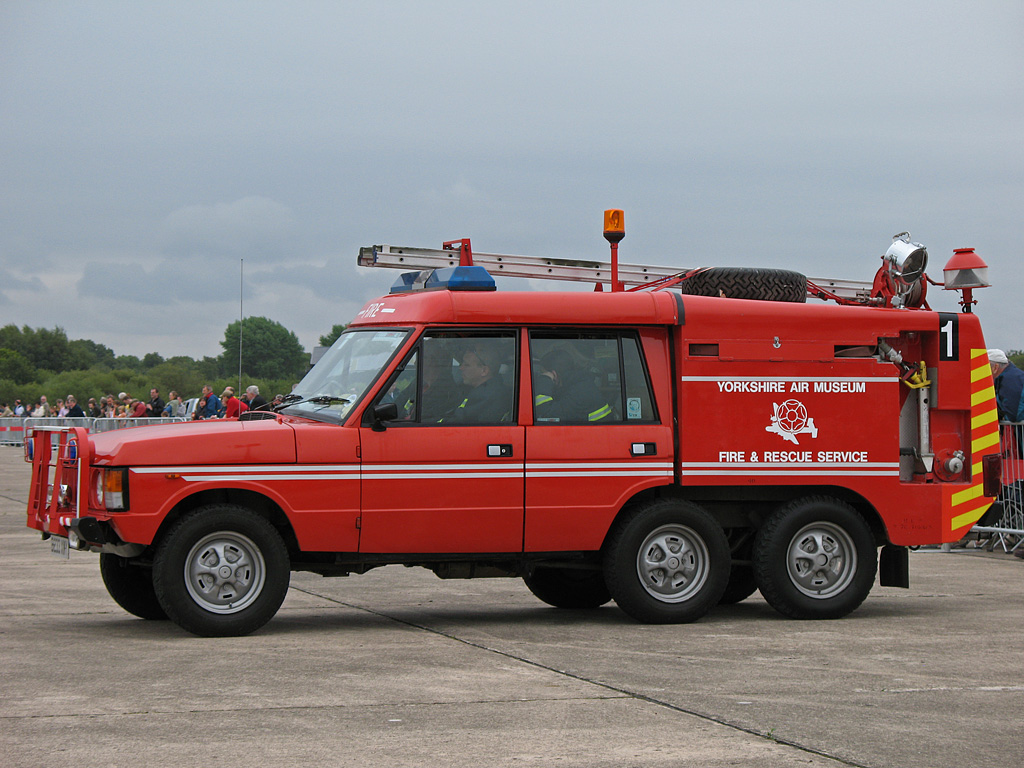
TACR2

Second World War

- Thompson Brothers Aircraft Refueller
- 1938 Ford Model E
- 1940 "Tilly" Standard 12 hp Mkl RAF Utility Vehicle
- 1941 Chevrolet 4x4 CMP
- 1942 Austin K2 NAAFI Wagon
- 1942 Thornycroft 'Amazon' Coles Crane

Cold War

- 1947 Commer one and a half deck airport coach
- 1949 Citroen 11BL
- 1948 David Brown VIG.2 Aircraft Tractor
- 1949 David Brown VIG.3 Aircraft Tractor
- 1951 David Brown GP Airfield Tractor
- 1953 Alvis Saracen 12ton APC
- 1953 Austin Champ Cargo 4x4 General Purpose Vehicle
- 1958 Commer Q4 Bikini Fire Pump Unit
- 1958 Lansing Aircraft Carrier Type Tug
- 1959 Daimler Ferret ASC MK.2/3/7
- 1966 Chieftain Main Battle Tank
- 1970 Douglas P3 nuclear aircraft 25 tonne tug
- 1971 Pathfinder Fire Engine 35ton (ex. Manchester Airport)
- 1972 TACR2 Range Rover - 6 wheeled fast response fire unit
- 1974 GMC 6 wheeled fast response airfield fire truck
- 1976 Dennis Mercury 17.5 tonne aircraft tug
- Pathfinder Fire Engine

== See also ==
- Listed buildings in Elvington, North Yorkshire
