= Rachel Semlyen =

British museum founder and director

Eleanor Rachel Semlyen MBE is a British museum founder and director.

== Biography ==
Semlyen has a degree in English and Philosophy from the University of Sussex. She worked for York City Council as a press officer publicising the National Railway Museum and other museum sites in the city. In the 1980s she approached the owners of "what was then an abandoned and derelict wartime site, with the idea of restoring the buildings and creating a museum" leading to the founding of the Yorkshire Air Museum.

In 1981 she co-authored, with Charles Kightly, a book on the Lord Mayors of York titled Lords of the City: The Lord Mayors of York and Their Mansion House.

In the 2022 Birthday Honours she was awarded an MBE for services to heritage.
