= 6×4 =

Type of drivetrain with 4 out of 6 driven wheels

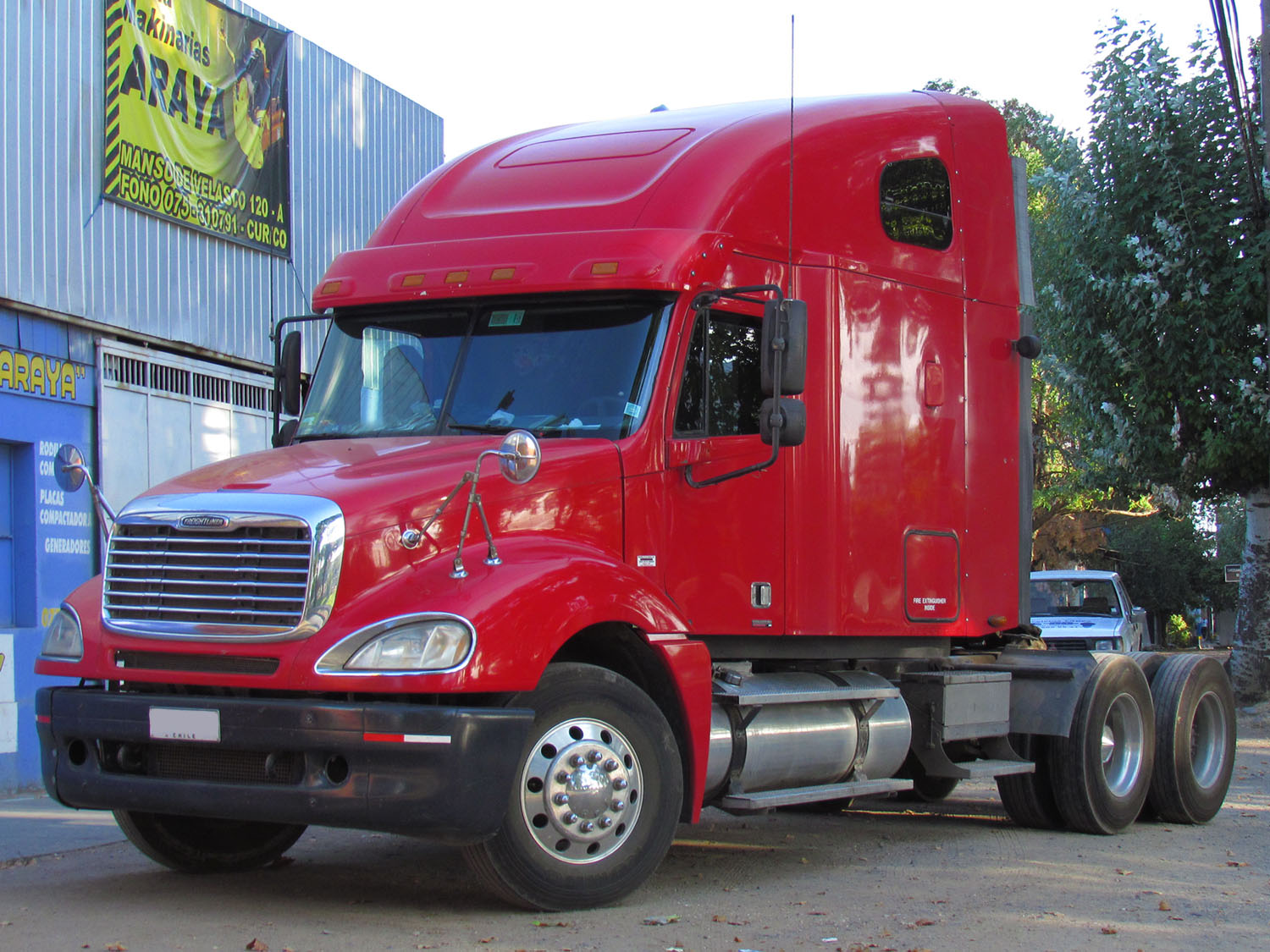
Typical American 6×4 tractor unit

A 6×4 or six-by-four is a vehicle with three axles, with a drivetrain delivering power to wheels at the ends of two of them. It is a form of four-wheel drive but not one of all-wheel drive.

It is the most common form of drivetrain of semi-tractors and heavy haul fixed-chassis cargo trucks in larger countries such as the United States and Australia; in Europe, 4×2 and 6×2 variants are more commonplace.

== Off-road vehicles ==
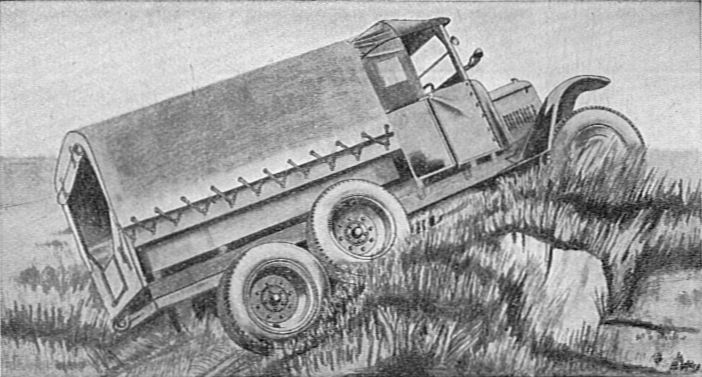
1937 military lorry off-road

The First World War saw a great adoption of petrol-engined lorries, beginning to replace horse transport. These were almost all simple 4×2 chassis, often based on commercial lorries or buses. Only a handful of 4×4 vehicles existed and these were slow and lumbering, with complicated servicing needed to their steering axle.

Between the wars there was a great interest in the development of vehicles with better off-road performance, both for the military and for the growing oil exploration industry. More driven axles were needed, for better grip, but also a heavier load capacity which itself required an additional axle. This led to designs favouring the 6×4 layout with only the non-steering rear axles driven. 4×4 was largely ignored at first, at least from the major truck makers. Military 6×4 chassis were also easier to produce for civilian manufacturers, as they were more similar to chassis for the larger civilian market, often just with uprated components. A few aberrations of 6×6, 8×8 and even half-tracks were produced, but these were mostly as gun tractors or recovery vehicles and were too complex and expensive for General Service trucks. The standard design became a 6×4 truck of 3 ton capacity, along with larger trucks of 10 tons.

=== Bogie suspension ===
With six wheels, the off-road performance often relied on articulation between the axles, so as to keep all the wheels in contact with uneven ground. A standard lorry chassis with live axles suspended by semi-elliptic leaf springs was inadequate for military use.

A solution to this was a bogie suspension. This coupled two rear wheels to a rigid frame or bogie but allowed this to tilt. The bogie pivoted freely for much of its range, allowing a greater movement than was possible with springs. (Note: Horstmann suspension did something similar for tracked vehicles and tanks, at around the same time.) One of the best-known heavy tractor units of World War II, the Scammell Pioneer, used this bogie system.

To encourage development, the War Office offered free use of a suspension design developed by Lt Col H. Niblett (1882–1969), then the professor of mechanical engineering at the RASC training college, Aldershot. This gave increased and independent articulation to the two rear axles. A pair of semi-elliptic leaf springs on each side were mounted lengthwise on the chassis, cambered downwards. The axles were attached to the ends of both of the paired springs, with each suspended by what was effectively two quarter-elliptic springs, in what was a relatively conventional design. This design also gave rise to the 6×6 AEC 850.

== Supplementary axles ==
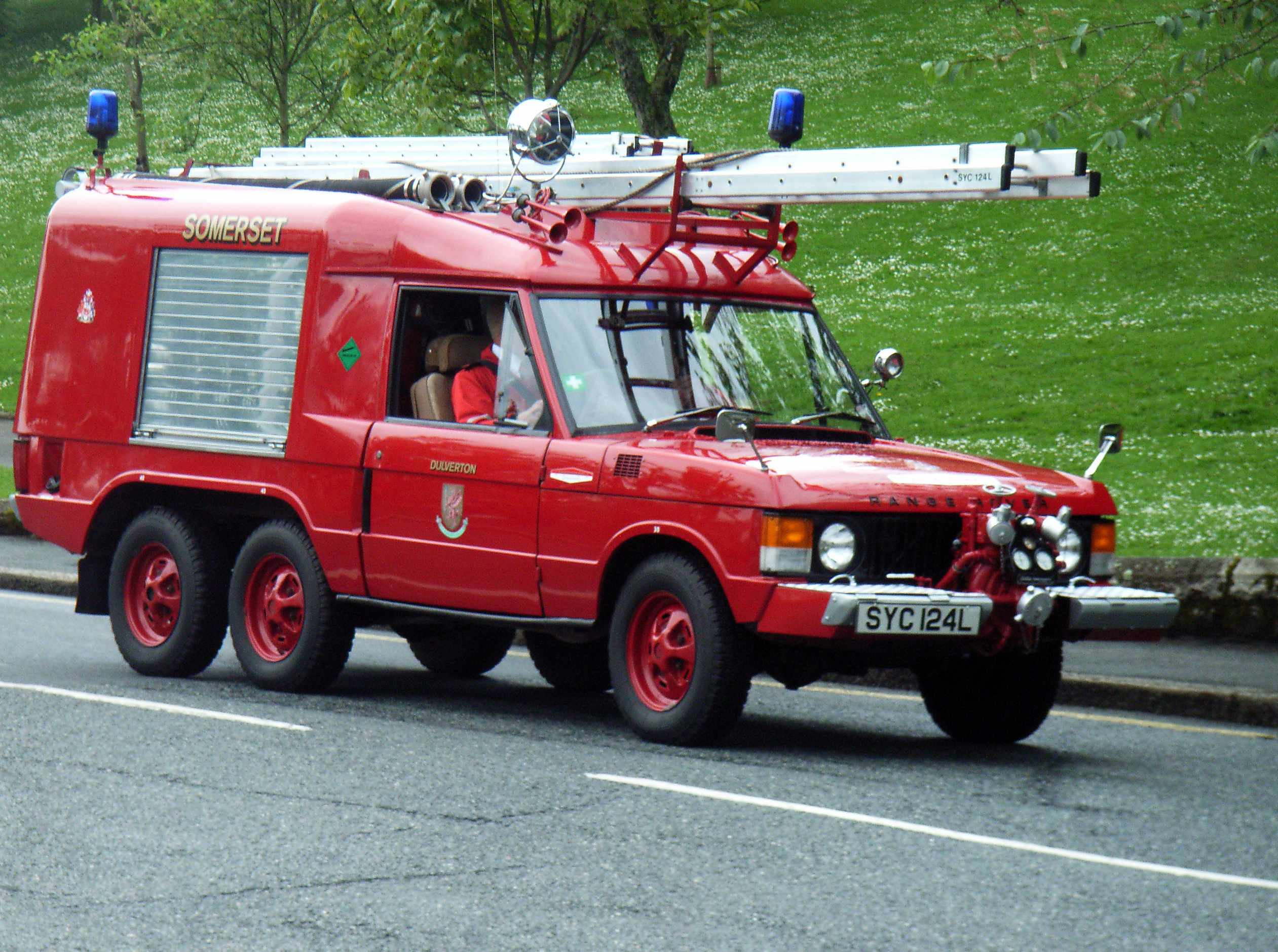
TACR2 airfield fire engine

Nearly all 6×4 have an unpowered leading steering axle, with two driven rear axles. However some mass-produced 4×4 (Note: These have been mostly AWD vehicles with permanent 4WD and good road performance rather than the selectable 4WD used more widely for earlier off-road vehicles.) vehicles have had their load-carrying capability increased by adding an additional, unpowered, rear axle.

The Carmichael Commando chassis, a stretched version of the Range Rover, was used for such extended 6×4 conversions in the 1970s and '80s. Some German conversions provided full 6×6 performance, but most were like the TACR2 and just 6×4. This gave a vehicle suitable for airfield emergency services; with fast performance on tarmac, useful off-road performance for crossing obstacles, increased load capacity and a much cheaper price than dedicated 6×6 vehicles.

== See also ==
- Four-wheel drive
- Six-wheel drive
