= Wisconsin Motor Manufacturing Company =

American engine manufacturer

The Wisconsin Motor Manufacturing Company of Milwaukee, Wisconsin, has been manufacturing internal combustion engines since 1909. In its early years Wisconsin made a full range of engines for automobiles, trucks, heavy construction machines, and maritime use. After 1930 it focused on small air-cooled engines widely used in agriculture and construction machines.

Wisconsin Engines (previously, Wisconsin Motors) continues to manufacture high quality engines.

== History ==
- March 12, 1909 Wisconsin Motor was incorporated by Charles H. John and Arthur F. Milbrath. By 1912 they employed about 300 people.
- 1937 Wisconsin Motor merged with Continental Motors Company but retained a separate identity.
- 1940 V series V4 engines introduced
- 1965 Ryan Aeronautical bought 50 per cent of Continental Motors Corporation
- 1969 Teledyne Technologies bought Continental Motors Corporation
- 1971 Fuji Heavy Industries, owner of Subaru, appointed Teledyne Wisconsin Motor US agents for their Robin engines
- 1992 Teledyne Total Power sold out to Nesco Incorporated
- 2010 Hydrogen Engine Center, Inc. and Wisconsin Motors Sign a Joint Venture
- September 30, 2017 Subaru Corporation ended production of small engines.

== Products ==
=== Small air-cooled engines ===
Wisconsin's fame came from its small air-cooled engines, such as AEH (used on generators, garden tractors, skidsteers tractors), AEN, and VF4. In the 1950s they were able to claim they were the world's largest manufacturer of heavy-duty air-cooled engines. All Wisconsin's products were 4-cycle and they had power outputs from 2.4 to 65.9 horsepower (2 to 49 kW). There were single, inline two, V-two, and V-four cylinder models. The engines were designed for outdoor field service in industries including agriculture, construction, marine, oil-field equipment and railway maintenance. There are a wide range of variations in each engine family, including displacement, vertical and horizontal crankshafts, power ratings, and fuel used. Fuels can be gasoline, heating oil, kerosene, LPG, and CNG.

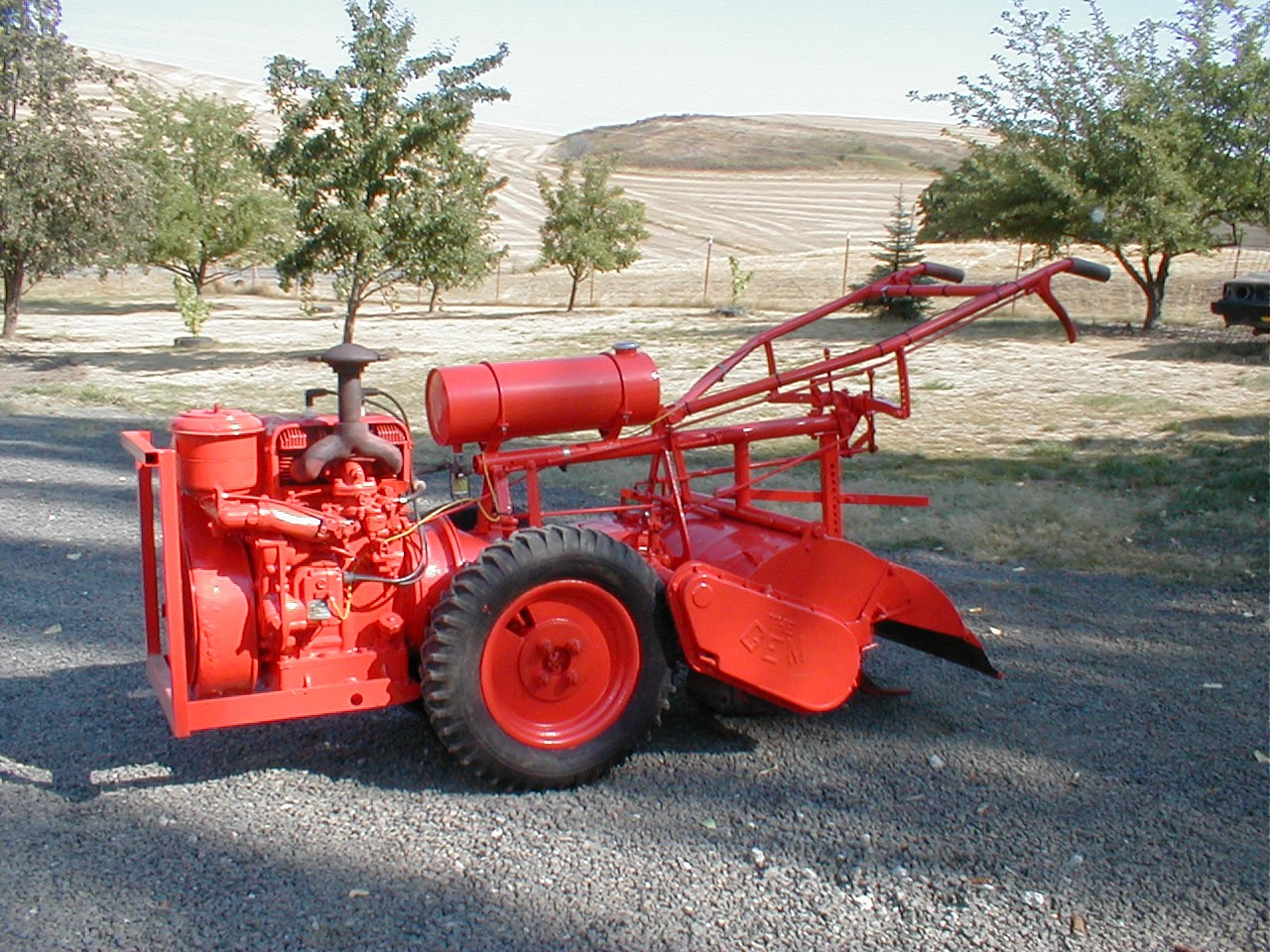
Howard Gem Rotavator with Wisconsin THD engine

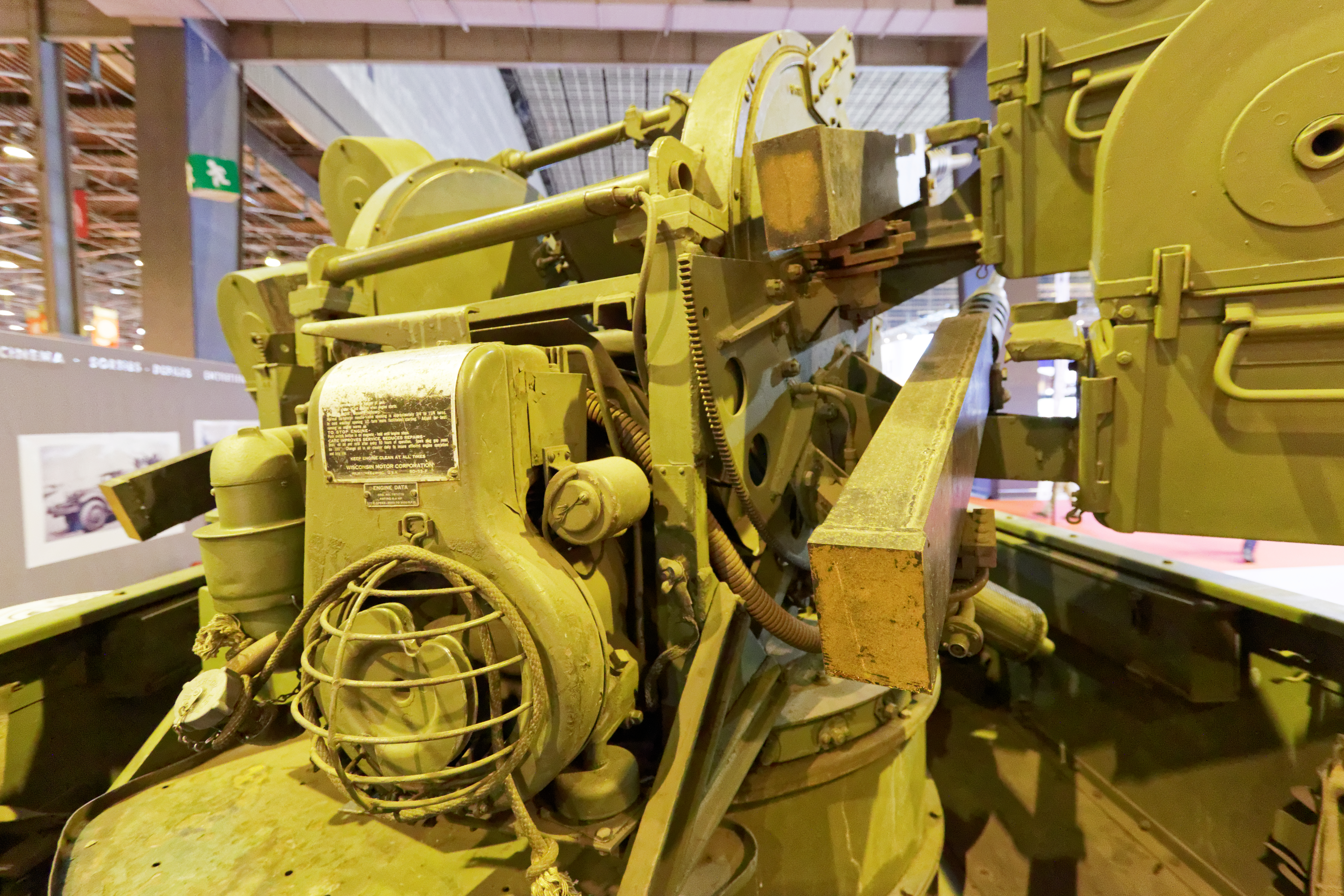
Wisconsin auxiliary on a White M16 Multiple Gun Motor Carriage

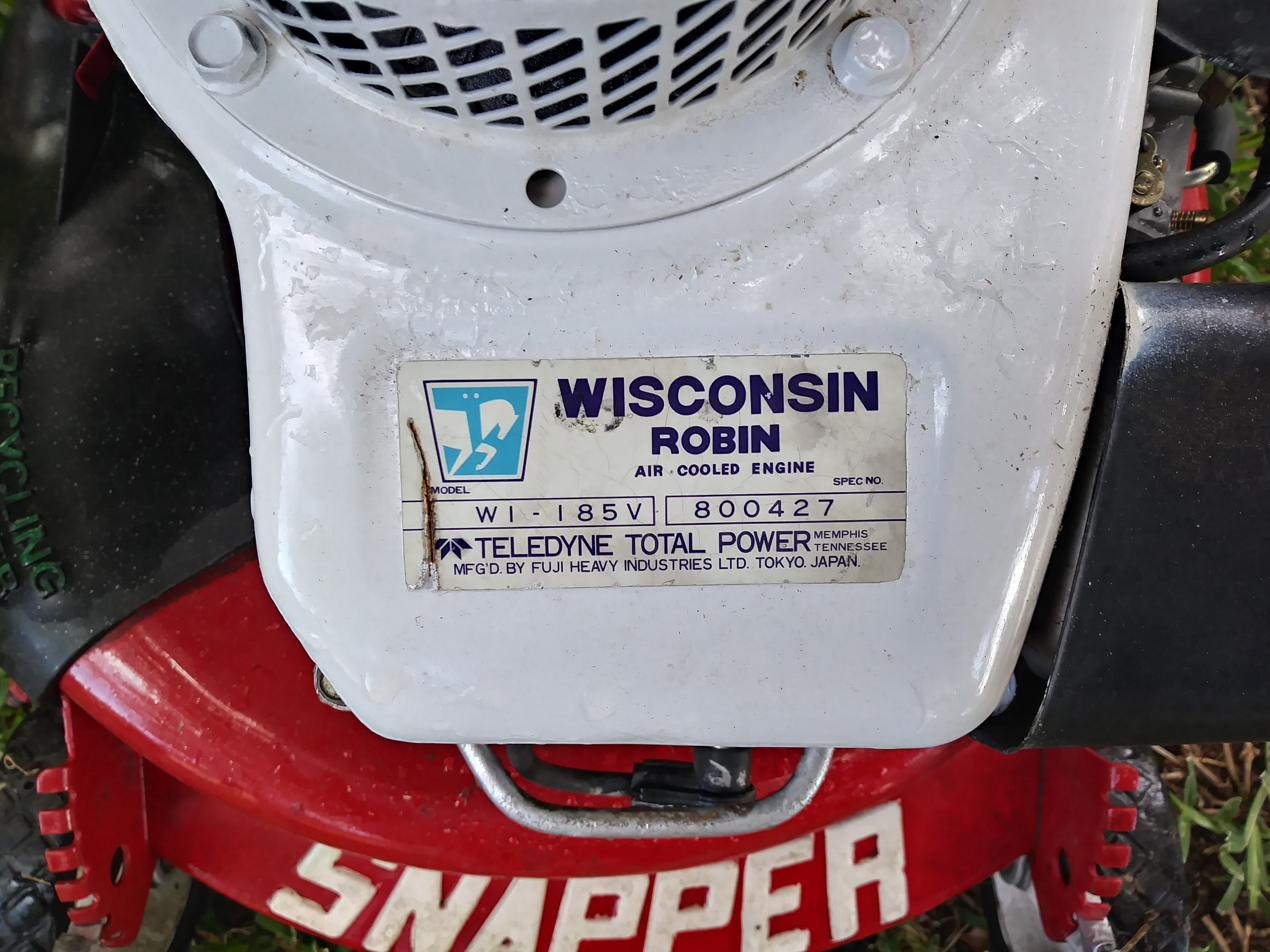
Snapper Mower with Wisconsin W1-185 engine

Model	Type	Power	Displacement	Years	Notes
A1 1/2	single	2.4 hp (2 kW)	28 cu in (0.5 L)	1930-1934	
AA	single	2.4 hp (2 kW)	10.9 cu in (0.2 L)		
AB	single		13.5 cu in (0.2 L)		
ABD	single				
ABS	single		13.5 cu in (0.2 L)		
ABSD	single				
ABN	single		13.5 cu in (0.2 L)		
ABND	single				
AK	single		17.8 cu in (0.3 L)		
AKD	single				
AKS	single		17.8 cu in (0.3 L)		
AKSD	single				
AKN	single		17.8 cu in (0.3 L)		
AKND	single				
A3	single	5 hp (4 kW)	40 cu in (0.7 L)	1930-1934	
A5	single	6 hp (4 kW)	44 cu in (0.7 L)	1930-1934	
AGND	single	12.5 hp (9 kW)	38.5 cu in (0.6 L)	1957-1991	
TE	I2	18 hp (13 kW)	45.9 cu in (0.8 L)		
TF	I2	18 hp (13 kW)	53.9 cu in (0.9 L)		
TH	I2	18 hp (13 kW)	53.9 cu in (0.9 L)		
THD	I2	18 hp (13 kW)	53.9 cu in (0.9 L)	1957-1976+	generator
TJD	I2	18 hp (13 kW)	53.9 cu in (0.9 L)		
VE4	V4	0 hp (0 kW)	91.9 cu in (1.5 L)		
VE4D (Military Version)	V4	0 hp (0 kW)	91.9 cu in (1.5 L)		
MVE4D (Military Version)	V4	0 hp (0 kW)	91.9 cu in (1.5 L)		
VF4	V4	0 hp (0 kW)	107.7 cu in (1.8 L)		
VF4D (Military Version)	V4	0 hp (0 kW)	107.7 cu in (1.8 L)		
MVF4D (Military Version)	V4	0 hp (0 kW)	107.7 cu in (1.8 L)		
MVG4D (Military Version)	V4	0 hp (0 kW)	148.5 cu in (2.4 L)		
VH4	V4	0 hp (0 kW)	107.7 cu in (1.8 L)		
VH4D	V4	30 hp (22 kW)	107.7 cu in (1.8 L)		70's Case\Bobcat skid-steer, pump
MVH4D (Military Version)	V4	0 hp (0 kW)	107.7 cu in (1.8 L)		
S-7D	Single	0 hp (0 kW)	18.6 cu in (0.3 L)		
S-8D	Single	0 hp (0 kW)	20.2 cu in (0.3 L)		
S-14D	single	14.1 hp (11 kW)	33.1 cu in (0.5 L)	1968-	yard tractor
W2-1250	V2	30 hp (22 kW)	75 cu in (1.2 L)		
V465D	V4	65.9 hp (49 kW)	177 cu in (2.9 L)		air comp., trencher, swather
W1-080	single				
W1-125	single				Vertical and Horizontal- mowers, generator, tiller, pump, etc.
W1-145	single	4 hp (3 kW)		197?-198?	Vertical and Horizontal- mowers, generator, tiller, pump, etc.
W1-185	single	5 hp (4 kW)		197?-199?	Vertical and Horizontal- mowers, generator, tiller, pump, etc.
W1-390v	single	7.5 hp (6 kW)			Vertical - mowers, generator, tiller, pump, etc.
W1-450v	single	10 hp (7 kW)		early 1990s	Vertical - mowers, generator, tiller, pump, etc.
W1-588	single				

=== Engines for cars and trucks ===
New automobile companies bought them for their big cars. The Stutz Bearcat car was available with either Wisconsin's four-cylinder Type A or their six-cylinder engine. Both engines were rated at 60 horsepower. Stutz began to build their own engines in 1917. Pierce-Arrow was among other customers for Wisconsin engines. Wisconsin engines also powered the trucks made by The FWD Corporation. Between 1945 and 1965 King Midget Cars used a Wisconsin AENL single cylinder engine in their micro car.

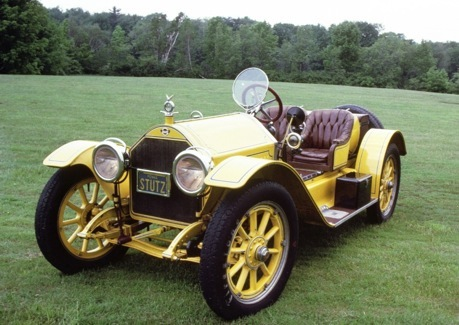
1914 Stutz Bearcat

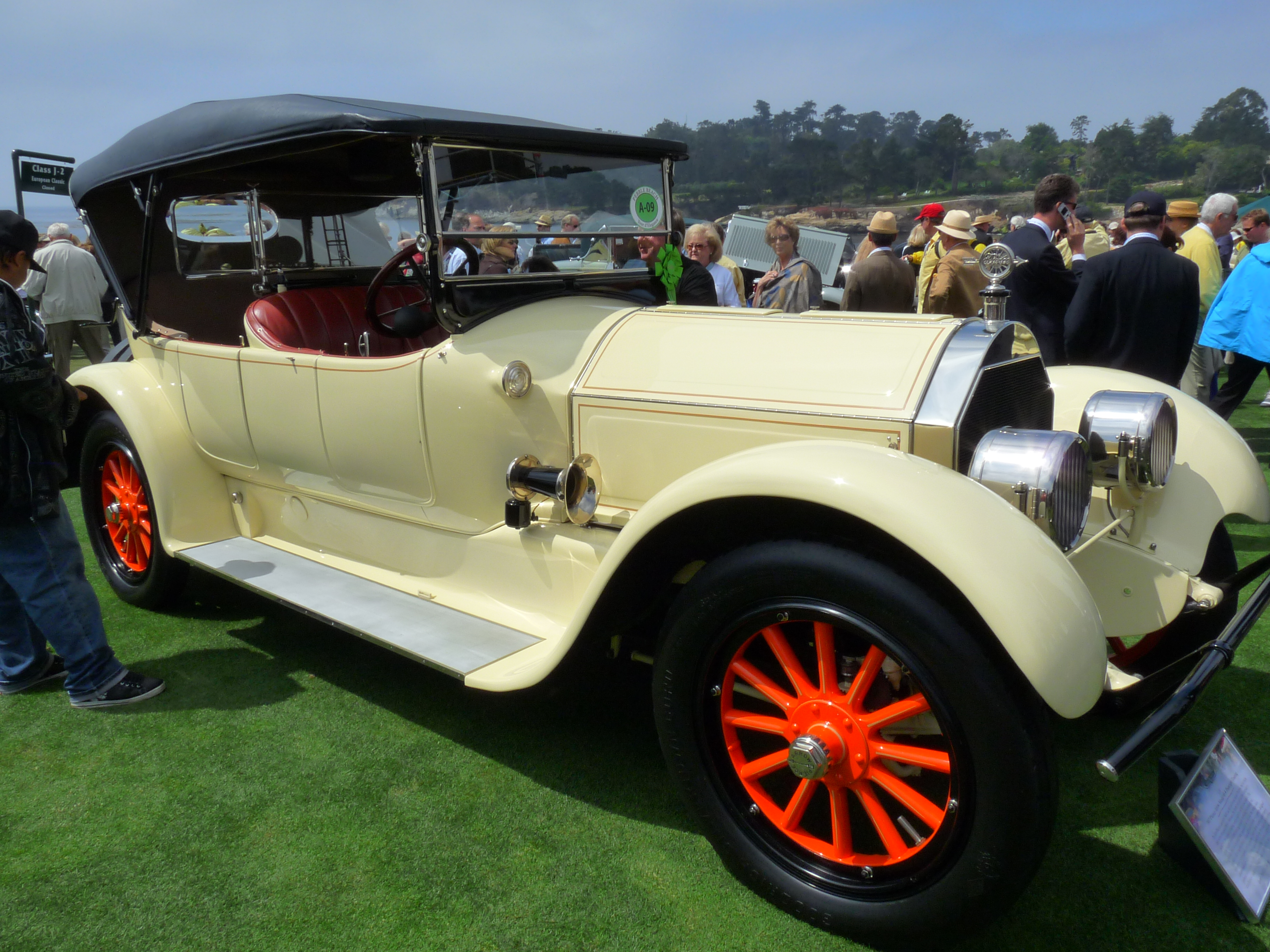
1917 Pierce-Arrow 48

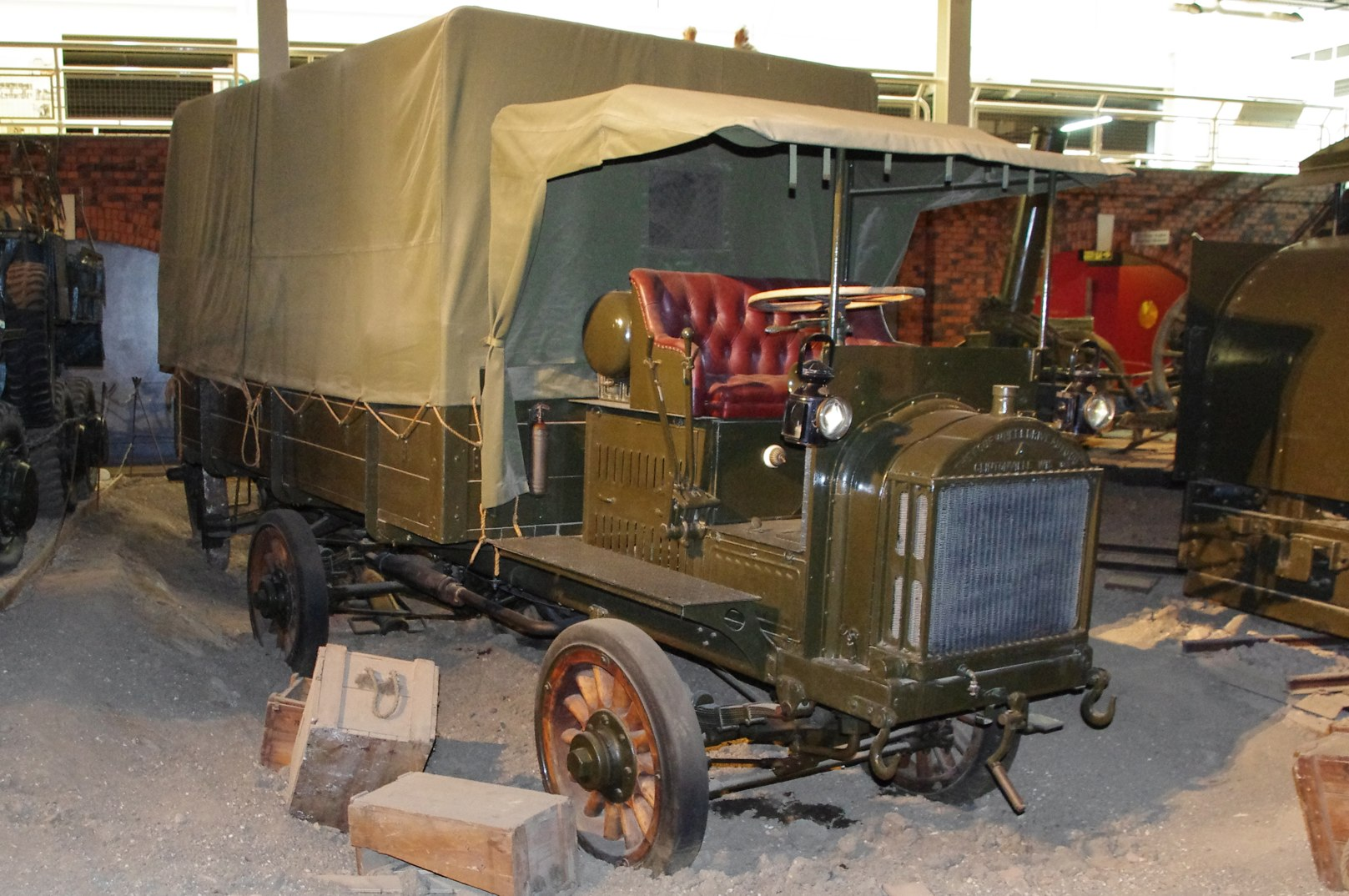
FWD military truck WWI

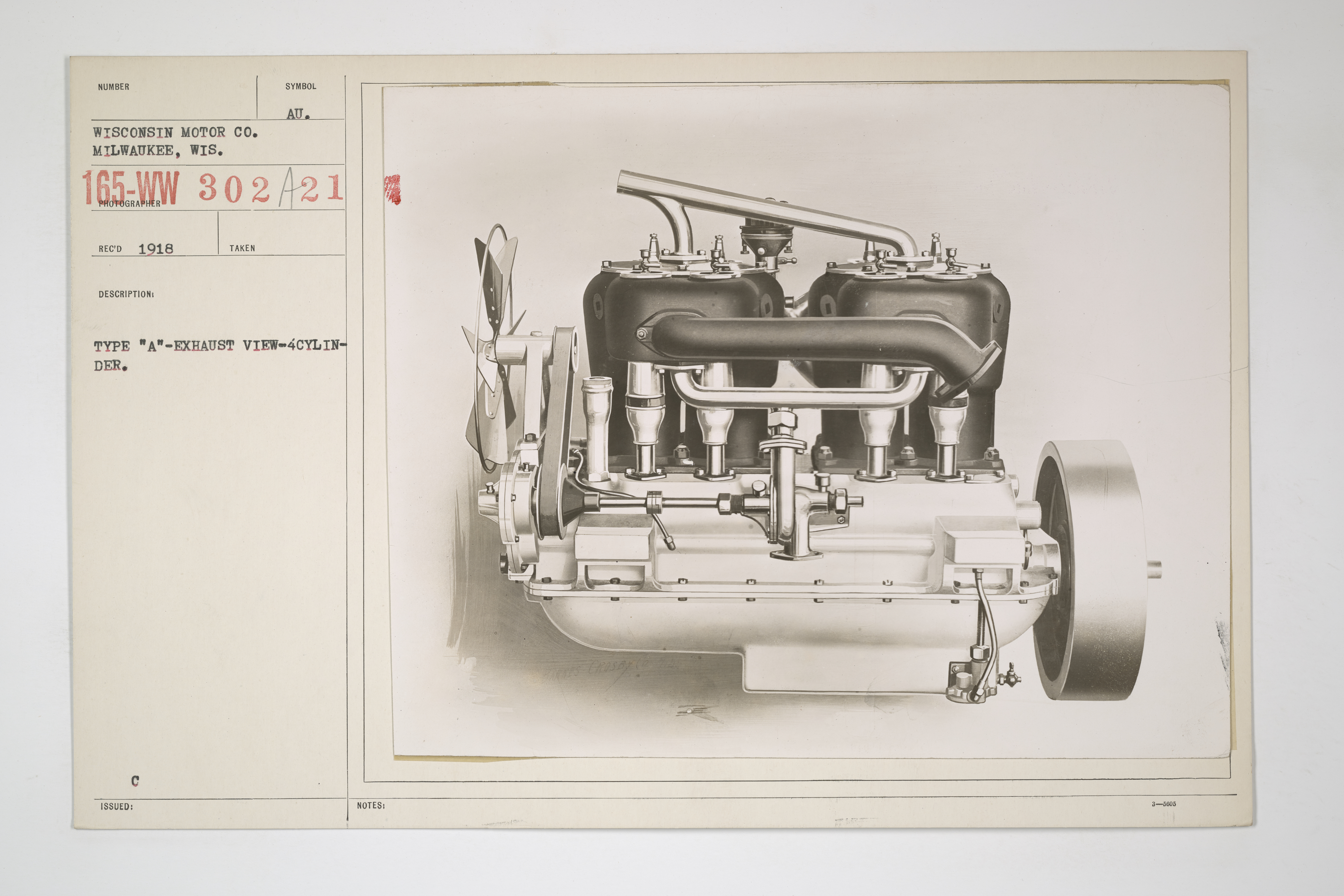
1917 Type A

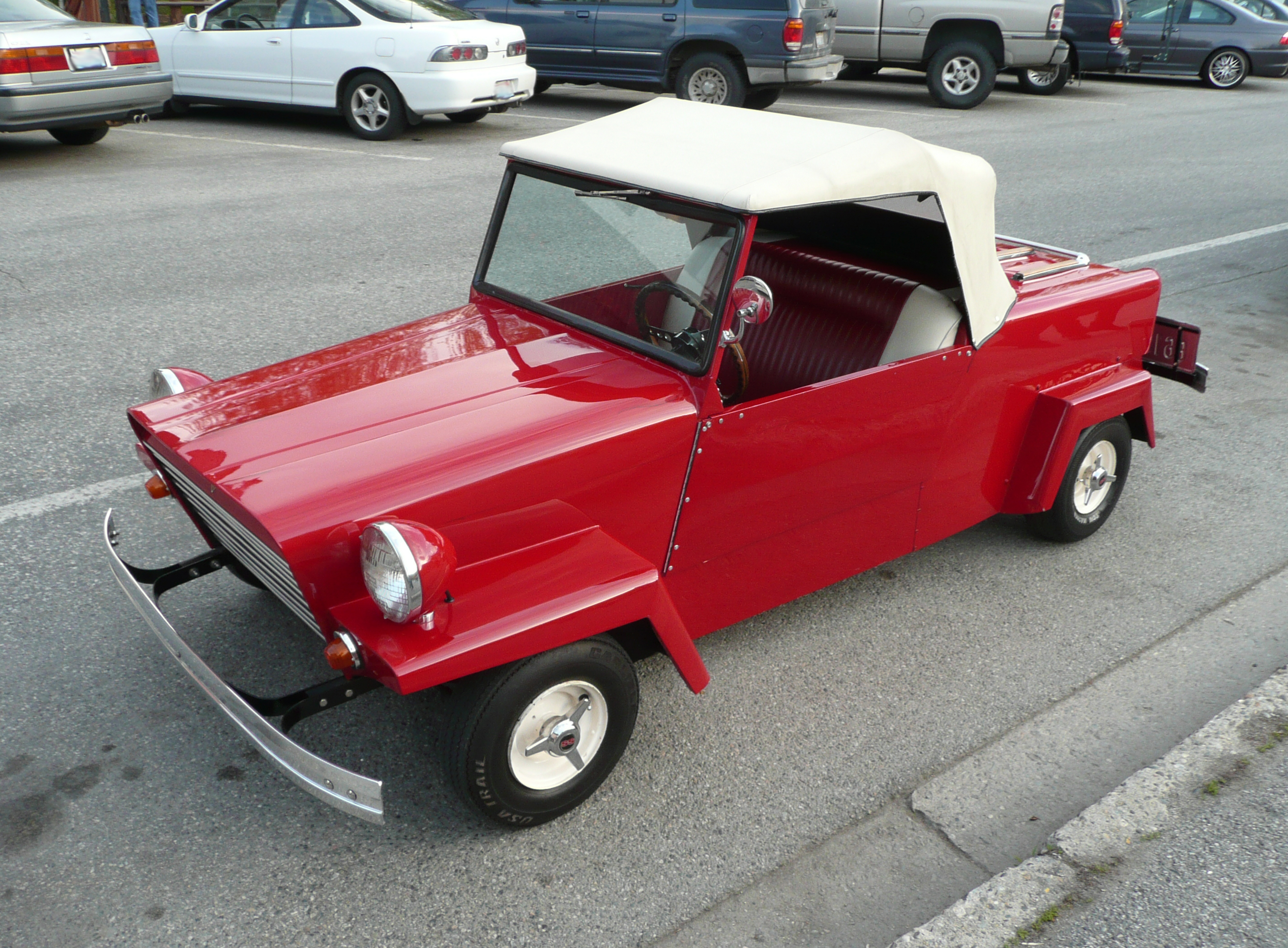
King Midget micro car

Model	Type	Displacement	Power	Years	Used in
Type A	Inline 4	389 cu in (6.4 L)	36 hp (27 kW)	1912-1919	FWD Model B 3-5-ton 4x4 trucks

=== Engines for construction equipment ===
Their four and six cylinder engines were used in heavy construction equipment including Bucyrus-Erie and Marion drag-lines and shovels.

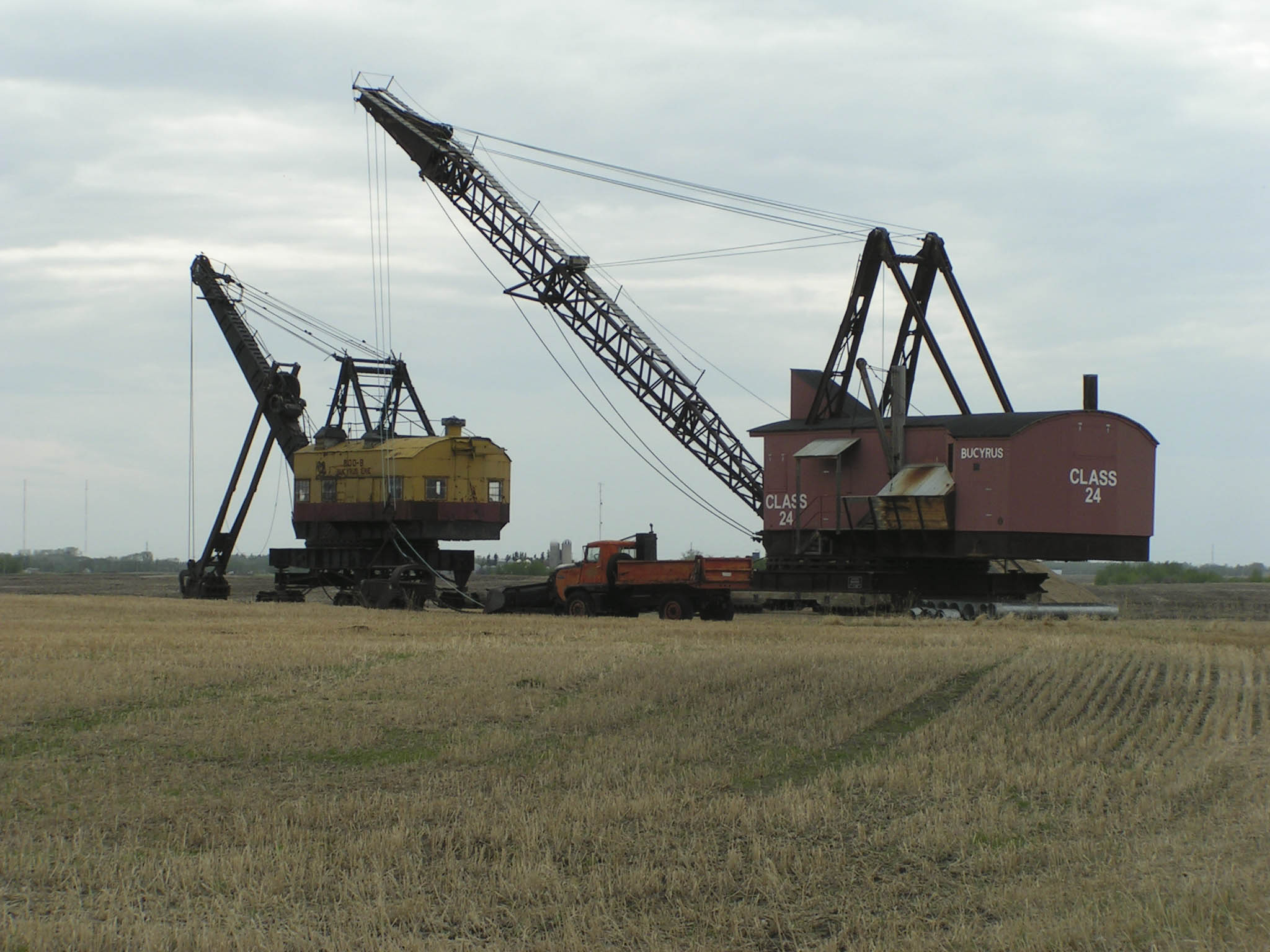
Bucyrus Erie 1917 dragline and 1929 stripping shovel

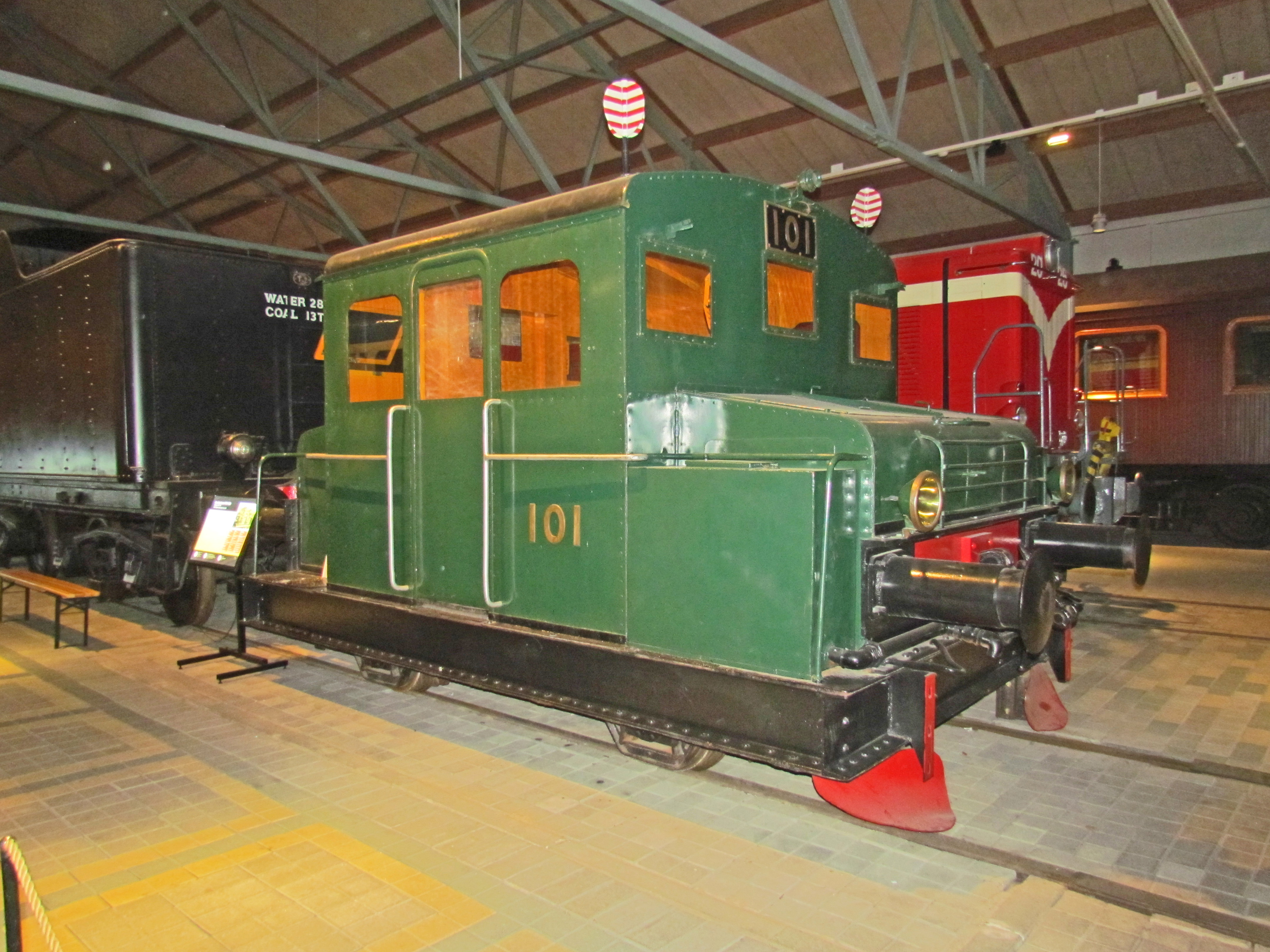
1930 shunting locomotive for Finnish Railway
