= 2006–07 Bobsleigh World Cup =

The 2006–07 Bobsleigh World Cup is a multi race tournament over a season for bobsleigh. The season started on 27 November 2006 and ended on 25 February 2007. The World Cup is organised by the FIBT who also run world cups and championships in skeleton.

== Calendar ==
=== Men ===
| Date | Place | Disc. | Winner | Second | Third |
|---|---|---|---|---|---|
| December 1, 2006 | Calgary, Alberta, Canada | Two-man | Germany; André Lange; Kevin Kuske | United States; Steven Holcomb; Brock Kreitzburg | Canada; Pierre Lueders; Lascelles Brown; Switzerland; Ivo Rüegg; Cédric Grand |
| December 2, 2006 | Calgary, Alberta, Canada | Four-man | Germany; André Lange; Kevin Kuske; Alexander Rödiger; Martin Putze | Russia; Yevgeni Popov; Roman Orechnikov; Dmitry Trunenkov; Dmitriy Stepushkin | Canada; Pierre Lueders; Lascelles Brown; Ken Kotyk; David Bissett |
| December 8, 2006 | Park City, Utah, United States | Two-man | Germany; André Lange; Kevin Kuske | United States; Steven Holcomb; Brock Kreitzburg | Canada; Pierre Lueders; Lascelles Brown |
| December 9, 2006 | Park City, Utah, United States | Four-man | Russia; Yevgeni Popov; Dmitry Trunenkov; Roman Orechnikov; Dmitriy Stepushkin | Germany; André Lange; Kevin Kuske; Alexander Rödiger; Martin Putze | Latvia; Jānis Miņins; Daumants Dreiškens; Ainārs Podnieks; Reinis Rozītis |
| December 16, 2006 | Lake Placid, United States | Two-man | Germany; André Lange; Kevin Kuske | United States; Steven Holcomb; Brock Kreitzburg | Canada; Pierre Lueders; Lascelles Brown |
| December 17, 2006 | Lake Placid, United States | Four-man | Russia; Yevgeni Popov; Dmitry Trunenkov; Roman Orechnikov; Dmitriy Stepushkin | Latvia; Jānis Miņins; Daumants Dreiškens; Ainārs Podnieks; Reinis Rozītis | Italy; Fabrizio Tosini; Ivan Giordani; Danilo Santarsiero; Mirko Turri |
| January 13, 2007 | Cortina d'Ampezzo, Italy | Two-man | United States; Steven Holcomb; Brock Kreitzburg | Canada; Pierre Lueders; David Bissett | Czech Republic; Ivo Danilevic; Roman Gomola |
| January 14, 2007 | Cortina d'Ampezzo, Italy | Four-man | United States; Steven Holcomb; Pavle Jovanovic; Steve Mesler; Brock Kreitzburg | Germany; André Lange; Alexander Rödiger; Kevin Kuske; Martin Putze | Canada; Pierre Lueders; Ken Kotyk; David Bissett; Lascelles Brown |
| January 20, 2007 | Igls, Austria | Two-man | Canada; Pierre Lueders; Lascelles Brown | Germany; Karl Angerer; Marc Kuehne | Switzerland; Daniel Schmid; Thomas Lamparter |
| January 21, 2007 | Igls, Austria | Four-man | United States; Steven Holcomb; Pavle Jovanovic; Steve Mesler; Brock Kreitzburg | Russia; Yevgeni Popov; Roman Orechnikov; Dmitry Truenenkov; Dmitriy Stepushkin | Germany; Karl Angerer; Andreas Udvari; Marc Kuehne; Benjamin Mielke |
| February 10, 2007 | Cesana, Italy | Two-man | Switzerland; Ivo Rüegg; Cédric Grand | United States; Steven Holcomb; Curtis Tomasevicz | Austria; Wolfgang Stampfer; Gerhard Koehler |
| February 11, 2007 | Cesana, Italy | Four-man | United States; Steven Holcomb; Pavle Jovanovic; Steve Mesler; Brock Kreitzburg | Russia; Yevgeni Popov; Dmitriy Stepushkin; Alexei Seliverstov; Kirill Sosunov | Germany; André Lange; René Hoppe; Kevin Kuske; Martin Putze |
| February 17, 2007 | Winterberg, Germany | Two-man | Germany; André Lange; Kevin Kuske | Germany; Matthias Höpfner; Andreas Porth | Canada; Pierre Lueders; David Bissett |
| February 18, 2007 | Winterberg, Germany | Four-man | Russia; Yevgeni Popov; Dmitry Trunenkov; Roman Orechnikov; Dmitriy Stepushkin | United States; Steven Holcomb; Pavle Jovanovic; Steve Mesler; Brock Kreitzburg | Latvia; Jānis Miņins; Daumants Dreiškens; Ainārs Podnieks; Reinis Rozītis |
| February 23, 2007 | Koenigssee, Germany | Two-man | Germany; André Lange; Kevin Kuske | Germany; Matthias Höpfner; Andreas Porth | Canada; Pierre Lueders; David Bissett |
| February 25, 2007 | Koenigssee, Germany | Four-man | Canada; Pierre Lueders; Ken Kotyk; David Bissett; Lascelles Brown | United States; Steven Holcomb; Pavle Jovanovic; Steve Mesler; Brock Kreitzburg | Latvia; Jānis Miņins; Daumants Dreiškens; Ainārs Podnieks; Reinis Rozītis |

=== Women ===
| Date | Place | Disc. | Winner | Second | Third |
|---|---|---|---|---|---|
| December 1, 2006 | Calgary, Alberta, Canada | Two-woman | United States; Shauna Rohbock; Valerie Fleming | Germany; Cathleen Martini; Janine Tischer | Germany; Sandra Kiriasis; Romy Logsch |
| December 8, 2006 | Park City, Utah, United States | Two-woman | United States; Shauna Rohbock; Valerie Fleming | Germany; Cathleen Martini; Janine Tischer | Canada; Helen Upperton; Jennifer Ciochetti |
| December 16, 2006 | Lake Placid, United States | Two-woman | Germany; Cathleen Martini; Janine Tischer | Canada; Helen Upperton; Jamie Cruickshank | United States; Shauna Rohbock; Valerie Fleming |
| January 12, 2007 | Cortina d'Ampezzo, Italy | Two-woman | Germany; Sandra Kiriasis; Romy Logsch | Germany; Cathleen Martini; Janine Tischer | Canada; Helen Upperton; Jennifer Ciochetti |
| January 20, 2007 | Igls, Austria | Two-woman | Germany; Sandra Kiriasis; Anja Schneiderheinze Stoeckel | United States; Shauna Rohbock; Valerie Fleming | Germany; Cathleen Martini; Janine Tischer |
| February 10, 2007 | Cesana, Italy | Two-woman | Germany; Sandra Kiriasis; Anja Schneiderheinze Stoeckel | United States; Shauna Rohbock; Valerie Fleming | Germany; Cathleen Martini; Janine Tischer |
| February 17, 2007 | Winterberg, Germany | Two-woman | Germany; Sandra Kiriasis; Romy Logsch | United States; Shauna Rohbock; Valerie Fleming | Germany; Cathleen Martini; Janine Tischer |
| February 24, 2007 | Koenigssee, Germany | Two-woman | Germany; Sandra Kiriasis; Berit Wiacker | United States; Shauna Rohbock; Valerie Fleming | Germany; Cathleen Martini; Janine Tischer |

== Men's overall results ==
=== Two-man ===
| Pos. | Bobsledders | CAL | PAC | LPL | COR | IGL | TUR | WIN | KÖN | Points |
|---|---|---|---|---|---|---|---|---|---|---|
| 1. | United States; Steven Holcomb | 90 | 90 | 90 | 100 | 70 | 100 | 50 | 70 | 660 |
| 2. | Canada; Pierre Lueders | 80 | 80 | 80 | 90 | 100 | 70 | 80 | 80 | 660 |
| 3. | Germany; André Lange | 100 | 100 | 100 | 65 | | DQ | 100 | 100 | 565 |
| 4. | Germany; Matthias Höpfner | 65 | 65 | 70 | DQ | 45 | 55 | 90 | 90 | 480 |
| 5. | Switzerland; Ivo Rüegg | 80 | 70 | 24 | 70 | 39 | 100 | 45 | 30 | 458 |
| 6. | Austria; Wolfgang Stampfer | 50 | 55 | 65 | 55 | 55 | 80 | 60 | 33 | 453 |
| 7. | Italy; Simone Bertazzo | 55 | 36 | 60 | 50 | 60 | 45 | 42 | 60 | 408 |
| 8. | Switzerland; Daniel Schmid | 39 | 45 | 50 | 6 | 80 | 50 | 55 | 45 | 370 |
| 9. | Monaco; Patrice Servelle | 22 | 39 | 55 | 45 | 42 | 60 | 27 | 50 | 340 |
| 10. | Russia; Yevgeni Popov | 42 | 42 | 42 | 33 | 36 | 65 | 30 | 42 | 332 |
| 11. | Germany; Karl Angerer | 60 | 50 | 20 | | 90 | 36 | | 65 | 321 |
| 12. | Austria; Jürgen Loacker | 36 | 33 | 36 | 30 | 33 | 30 | 39 | 55 | 292 |
| 13. | Italy; Fabrizio Tosini | 33 | 30 | 42 | 36 | 50 | DQ | 68 | 24 | 280 |
| 14. | Latvia; Jānis Miņins | 30 | 27 | 22 | 39 | 27 | 39 | 36 | 22 | 242 |
| 15. | Czech Republic; Ivo Danilevic | 14 | 18 | 18 | 80 | 24 | 42 | | 39 | 235 |

=== Four-man ===
| Pos. | Bobsledders | CAL | PAC | LPL | COR | IGL | TUR | WIN | KÖN | Points |
|---|---|---|---|---|---|---|---|---|---|---|
| 1. | Russia; Yevgeni Popov | 90 | 100 | 100 | 70 | 90 | 90 | 100 | 45 | 685 |
| 2. | United States; Steven Holcomb | 65 | 60 | 55 | 100 | 100 | 100 | 90 | 90 | 660 |
| 3. | Canada; Pierre Lueders | 80 | 70 | 70 | 80 | 65 | 60 | 70 | 100 | 595 |
| 4. | Latvia; Jānis Miņins | 60 | 80 | 90 | 55 | 70 | 70 | 80 | 80 | 585 |
| 5. | Germany; André Lange | 100 | 90 | | 90 | | 80 | 65 | 50 | 475 |
| 6. | Switzerland; Ivo Rüegg | 50 | 70 | 60 | 65 | 60 | 65 | 42 | 36 | 448 |
| 7. | Germany; Matthias Höpfner | 55 | 36 | 70 | 42 | 55 | 42 | 45 | 65 | 410 |
| 8. | Italy; Fabrizio Tosini | 22 | 33 | 80 | 36 | 42 | 50 | 60 | 60 | 383 |
| 9. | Austria; Wolfgang Stampfer | 42 | 50 | 45 | 30 | 50 | 45 | 27 | 30 | 319 |
| 10. | Italy; Simone Bertazzo | 39 | 24 | 50 | 45 | 33 | 55 | 33 | 16 | 295 |
| 11. | Switzerland; Daniel Schmid | 27 | 27 | 30 | 27 | 30 | | 55 | 55 | 251 |
| 12. | Germany; Karl Angerer | 33 | 45 | | | 80 | 36 | | 33 | 227 |
| 13. | Czech Republic; Ivo Danilevic | 24 | 30 | 33 | 33 | 24 | 30 | | 18 | 192 |
| 14. | Switzerland; Martin Galliker | 36 | | | dsq | 39 | 24 | 36 | 39 | 174 |
| 15. | United States; Mike Kohn | 45 | 42 | 39 | | 45 | | | | 171 |

== Women's overall results ==
=== Two-woman ===
| Pos. | Bobsledders | CAL | PAC | LPL | COR | IGL | TUR | WIN | KÖN | Points |
|---|---|---|---|---|---|---|---|---|---|---|
| 1. | Germany; Sandra Kiriasis | 80 | 70 | 80 | 100 | 100 | 100 | 100 | 100 | 730 |
| 2. | United States; Shauna Rohbock | 100 | 100 | 80 | 70 | 90 | 90 | 90 | 90 | 710 |
| 3. | Germany; Cathleen Martini | 90 | 90 | 100 | 90 | 80 | 80 | 80 | 80 | 690 |
| 4. | Canada; Helen Upperton | 70 | 80 | 90 | 80 | 70 | 70 | 70 | 70 | 600 |
| 5. | Switzerland; Maya Bamert | 55 | 45 | 39 | 50 | 55 | 60 | 65 | 60 | 429 |
| 6. | Italy; Jessica Gillarduzzi | 39 | | 45 | 65 | 65 | 36 | 42 | 45 | 373 |
| 7. | Canada; Amanda Stepenko | 42 | 50 | 60 | 42 | 39 | 55 | 39 | 33 | 360 |
| 8. | Netherlands; Eline Jurg | 45 | 42 | 42 | 33 | 36 | 42 | 50 | 50 | 340 |
| 9. | Russia; Victoria Tokovaia | 60 | 65 | 33 | 30 | 42 | 50 | 27 | 27 | 334 |
| 10. | Germany; Susi Erdmann | | | | 60 | 60 | 65 | 55 | 65 | 305 |
| 11. | Switzerland; Sabrina Hafner | 50 | 60 | 50 | 55 | | | 45 | 42 | 302 |
| 12. | Switzerland; Isabel Baumann | 36 | | 36 | 39 | 27 | 39 | 30 | 36 | 243 |
| 13. | Germany; Claudia Schramm | 65 | 39 | 65 | 0 | 0 | 0 | 0 | 0 | 169 |
| 14. | Russia; Alevtina Kovalenko | | | | | 33 | dns | 60 | 55 | 148 |
| 15. | United Kingdom; Jackie Davies | | | | | | 45 | 36 | 30 | 111 |
