= Bobsleigh at the 2010 Winter Olympics – Two-man =

Two-man at the XXI Olympic Winter Games
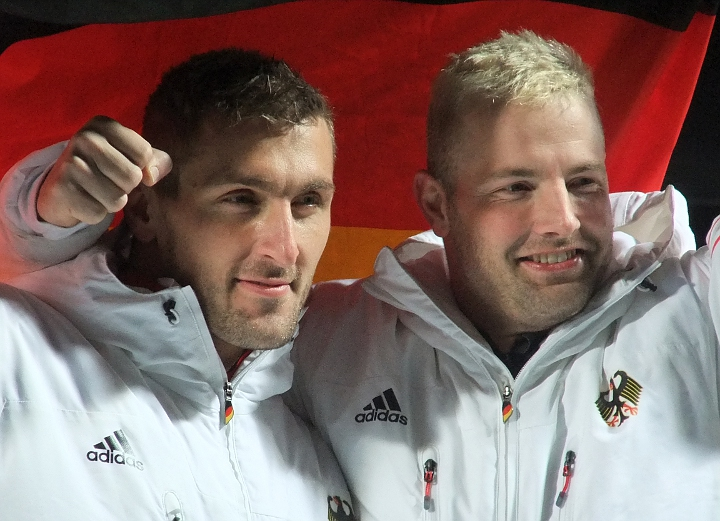
- Gold medal winners
- Venue: Whistler Sliding Centre
- Dates: 20–21 February 2010
- Competitors: 27 teams from 18 nations
- Winning time: 3:27.51

Medalists
1st place, gold medalist(s)		André Lange; Kevin Kuske	Germany
2nd place, silver medalist(s)		Thomas Florschütz; Richard Adjei	Germany
3rd place, bronze medalist(s)		Alexandr Zubkov; Alexey Voyevoda	Russia

The two-man bobsleigh competition at the 2010 Winter Olympics in Vancouver, British Columbia, Canada, was held at the Whistler Sliding Centre in Whistler, British Columbia on 20–21 February. The German team of André Lange and Kevin Kuske were the defending Olympic champions in this event. Switzerland's team of Ivo Rüegg and Cedric Grand were the defending world champions in this event. The test event held at the Olympic venue was won by the German duo of Thomas Florschütz and Marc Kühne. The last World Cup event prior to the 2010 Games took place in Igls, Austria (southeast of Innsbruck) on 23 January 2010 and was won by the Swiss duo of Beat Hefti and Thomas Lamparter while Rüegg won the overall World Cup in the two-man event.

== Records ==
While the IOC does not consider bobsled times eligible for Olympic records, the FIBT does maintain records for both the start and a complete run at each track it competes.

The start and track records were set at the test event for the 2010 Games on 6 February 2009.

Type	Date	Team	Time
Start	6 February 2009	Switzerland; Beat Hefti; Thomas Lamparter	4.70
Track	6 February 2009	Switzerland; Beat Hefti; Thomas Lamparter	51.95

== Qualifying teams ==
On 20 January 2010, the FIBT announced that the following teams had qualified for the 2010 Games: This was finalized on 26 January 2010.

Three teams

- Germany, Switzerland, and United States.

Two teams

- Canada, Russia, Italy, Austria, Latvia, Australia.

One team

- Great Britain, Netherlands, Romania, Czech Republic, Poland, Slovakia, Monaco, Liechtenstein, and Japan.

== Practice ==
Bobsleigh practice began on 17 February 2010 with the two-man event. Eight crashes among 57 runs took place that day. Three crashes occurred during the 18 February 2010 two-man training session. Among the crashes in the two-man event were Switzerland's Beat Hefti and Daniel Schmid who both withdrew from the two man event. Meanwhile, Latvia's Janis Minins withdrew to appendicitis and the emergency surgery that followed on 12 February. Minins returned to competition for the four-man event eleven days later though he withdrew from the four-man event on 25 February to crashing twice during practice where one of his crews suffering a concussion and another suffering bruised lungs and elbows.

== Results ==
The first two runs took place on 20 February at 17:00 PST and 18:30 PST. On 21 February, the final two runs were scheduled to take place at 13:30 PST and 14:45 PST, but started at 16:00 PST for run three and 17:35 PST for run four to unseasonable warm weather. Temperatures reached 10 °C (50 °F) on the afternoon of the 20th and were expected to reach 12 °C (54 °F) on the afternoon of the 21st.

First run start order was released on the afternoon of 19 February 2010.

Australia 2 crashed out in run 1 while Great Britain 1 was disqualified when the brakeman Money was ejected from his sled during the first run. Austria 1 was disqualified for violating the total weight rule. Liechtenstein 1 crashed out during the first run and finished, but did not start the second run of the event.

For run 3, Bisset replace Brown in Canada 1 while Harvey replaced Ryan in Australia 1. Italy 1 was disqualified in run 3 for reasons not given. Only the top 20 teams competed in the fourth run. No crashes occurred in the final two runs of the event. Lange tied the track record in the third run that was sent by Florschütz in the second run. The German duo of Lange and Kuske won his record fourth gold medal in bobsleigh at the Winter Olympics and became the second repeat winners of the two-man event after Switzerland's Gustav Weder and Donat Acklin won the event in both 1992 and 1994.

TR - Track Record. Top finish in each run is in boldface.

Rank	Bib	Country	Athletes	Run 1	Run 2	Run 3	Run 4	Total	Behind
1st place, gold medalist(s)	4	Germany (GER-1)	André Lange; Kevin Kuske	51.59	**51.72**	**51.57**-TR	**51.77**	3:26.65	
2nd place, silver medalist(s)	2	Germany (GER-2)	Thomas Florschütz; Richard Adjei	**51.57**-TR	51.85	51.62	51.83	3:26.87	+0.22
3rd place, bronze medalist(s)	7	Russia (RUS-1)	Alexandr Zubkov; Alexey Voyevoda	51.79	52.02	51.80	51.90	3:27.51	+0.86
4	1	Switzerland (SUI-1)	Ivo Rüegg; Cedric Grand	51.76	52.18	51.92	51.99	3:27.85	+1.20
5	9	Canada (CAN-2)	Pierre Lueders; Jesse Lumsden	51.94	52.12	51.87	51.94	3:27.87	+1.22
6	6	United States (USA-1)	Steve Holcomb; Curtis Tomasevicz	51.89	52.04	51.98	52.03	3:27.94	+1.29
7	11	Russia (RUS-2)	Dmitry Abramovitch; Sergey Prudnikov	52.03	52.40	52.11	51.92	3:28.46	+1.81
8	25	Latvia (LAT-1)	Edgars Maskalāns; Daumants Dreiškens	52.16	52.32	52.17	52.43	3:29.08	+2.43
9	3	Germany (GER-3)	Karl Angerer; Gregor Bermbach	52.23	52.43	52.19	52.44	3:29.29	+2.64
10	8	United States (USA-2)	John Napier; Steven Langton	52.28	52.45	52.31	52.36	3:29.40	+2.75
11	14	Romania (ROU-1)	Nicolae Istrate; Florin Cezar Craciun	52.19	52.41	52.40	52.43	3:29.43	+2.78
12	13	United States (USA-3)	Mike Kohn; Nick Cunningham	52.47	52.71	52.25	52.35	3:29.78	+3.13
13	16	Czech Republic (CZE-1)	Ivo Danilevic; Jan Stoklaska	52.73	52.59	52.52	52.44	3:30.28	+3.63
14	10	Netherlands (NED-1)	Edwin van Calker; Sybren Jansma	52.37	52.83	52.63	52.62	3:30.45	+3.80
15	5	Canada (CAN-1)	Lyndon Rush; Lascelles Brown (Runs 1-2); David Bissett (Runs 3-4)	51.67	54.70	51.93	52.16	3:30.46	+3.81
16	19	Poland (POL-1)	Dawid Kupczyk; Marcin Niewiara	52.45	52.91	52.42	52.72	3:30.50	+3.85
17	18	Italy (ITA-2)	Fabrizio Tosini; Sergio Riva	52.84	52.83	52.34	52.65	3:30.66	+4.01
18	15	Austria (AUT-2)	Jürgen Loacker; Christian Hackl	52.55	52.86	52.73	52.64	3:30.78	+4.13
19	21	Monaco (MON-1)	Patrice Servelle; Sébastien Gattuso	52.96	52.61	52.71	52.56	3:30.84	+4.19
20	20	Slovakia (SVK-1)	Milan Jagnešák; Petr Narovec	53.18	53.16	52.73	52.99	3:32.06	+5.41
21	23	Japan (JPN-1)	Hiroshi Suzuki; Ryuichi Kobayashi	53.24	53.30	53.13		2:39.67	
22	17	Australia (AUS-1)	Christopher Spring; Duncan Harvey (Runs 1-2); Anthony Ryan (Run 3)	53.14	54.41	53.18		2:40.73	
	12	Italy (ITA-1)	Simone Bertazzo; Samuele Romanini	52.33	52.88	DSQ			
	22	Liechtenstein (LIE-1)	Michael Klingler; Thomas Dürr	56.18	DNS				
	27	Australia (AUS-2)	Jeremy Rollestone; Duncan Pugh	DNF					
	26	Austria (AUT-1)	Wolfgang Stampfer; Juergen Mayer	DSQ					
	24	Great Britain (GBR-1)	John James Jackson; Dan Money	DSQ					
