= Bobsleigh at the 2006 Winter Olympics – Two-man =

Two-man at the XX Olympic Winter Games
- Pictogram for bobsleigh
- Venue: Cesana Pariol
- Dates: February 18 — 19, 2006
- Competitors: 58 from 19 nations
- Winning time: 3:43.38

Medalists
1st place, gold medalist(s)		André Lange, Kevin Kuske	Germany
2nd place, silver medalist(s)		Pierre Lueders, Lascelles Brown	Canada
3rd place, bronze medalist(s)		Martin Annen, Beat Hefti	Switzerland

The Men's two-man bobsleigh competition at the 2006 Winter Olympics in Turin, Italy was held on 18 and 19 February, at Cesana Pariol.

== Records ==
While the IOC does not consider bobsled times eligible for Olympic records, the FIBT does maintain records for both the start and a complete run at each track it competes.

Prior to this competition, the existing Cesana Pariol track records were as follows.

Type	Date	Team	Time
Start	22 January 2005	Canada; Pierre Lueders; Lascelles Brown	4.77
Run	22 January 2005	Switzerland; Martin Annen; Beat Hefti	56.55

The following track records were established during this event.

Type	Date	Run	Team	Time
Start	18 February	1	Russia (RUS-1); Alexandre Zoubkov; Alexey Voevoda	4.76
Run	18 February	1	Switzerland (SUI-1); Martin Annen; Beat Hefti	55.54
Run	18 February	1	Russia (RUS-1); Alexandre Zoubkov; Alexey Voevoda	55.54
Run	18 February	1	Germany (GER-1); André Lange; Kevin Kuske	55.28

The Russian team of Zubkov and Voevoda equalled the track record set just two sleds earlier by Annen and Hefti, but this tie was short-lived; Lange and Kuske, the next team down, broke it by 0.26 seconds.

== Results ==
Each of the 29 two-man teams entered for the event completed the first three runs, and the top 20 qualified for the final run. The total time for all four runs was used to determine the final ranking.

Rank	Country	Athletes	Run 1	Run 2	Run 3	Run 4	Total
Gold medal	Germany (GER-1)	André Lange; Kevin Kuske	55.28	55.73	56.01	56.36	3:43.38
Silver medal	Canada (CAN-1)	Pierre Lueders; Lascelles Brown	55.57	55.50	56.11	56.41	3:43.59
Bronze medal	Switzerland (SUI-1)	Martin Annen; Beat Hefti	55.54	55.67	56.18	56.34	3:43.73
4	Russia (RUS-1)	Alexandre Zoubkov; Alexey Voevoda	55.54	55.85	56.12	56.49	3:44.00
5	Germany (GER-2)	Matthias Hoepfner; Marc Kuehne	55.56	55.82	56.24	56.63	3:44.25
6	Latvia (LAT-1)	Jānis Miņins; Daumants Dreiškens	55.94	55.84	56.16	56.69	3:44.63
7	United States (USA-1)	Todd Hays; Pavle Jovanovic	55.81	55.72	56.31	56.88	3:44.72
8	Switzerland (SUI-2)	Ivo Rueegg; Cedric Grand	55.85	55.74	56.37	56.90	3:44.86
9	Italy (ITA-1)	Simone Bertazzo; Matteo Torchio	55.78	55.99	56.43	56.95	3:45.15
10	Austria (AUT-1)	Wolfgang Stampfer; Klaus Seelos	55.92	55.94	56.57	56.90	3:45.33
11	Canada (CAN-2)	Serge Despres; David Bissett	56.13	55.92	56.69	56.93	3:45.67
12	Monaco	Patrice Servelle; Jérémy Bottin	56.21	56.13	56.67	57.08	3:46.09
13	Italy (ITA-2)	Fabrizio Tosini; Samuele Romanini	56.06	56.02	56.93	57.10	3:46.11
14	United States (USA-2)	Steve Holcomb; Bill Schuffenhauer	56.16	55.96	57.05	57.04	3:46.21
15	Great Britain	Lee Johnston; Dan Humphries	56.22	55.84	57.20	57.08	3:46.34
16	Czech Republic (CZE-1)	Ivo Danilevic; Roman Gomola	56.40	56.24	56.99	57.12	3:46.75
17	Austria (AUT-2)	Juergen Loacker; Gerhard Koehler	56.29	56.22	57.07	57.69	3:47.27
18	Russia (RUS-2)	Yevgeni Popov; Roman Oreshnikov	56.56	56.50	56.98	57.29	3:47.33
19	Netherlands	Arend Glas; Sybren Jansma	56.70	56.54	56.95	57.17	3:47.36
20	Latvia (LAT-2)	Gatis Guts; Intars Dicmanis	56.37	56.36	57.05	57.73	3:47.51
21	France	Bruno Mingeon; Stephane Galbert	56.49	56.75	57.11	—	—
22	Australia	Jeremy Rollestone; Shane McKenzie	56.77	56.59	57.22	—	—
23	New Zealand	Alan Henderson; Matthew Dallow	56.61	56.79	57.46	—	—
24	Romania (ROM-1)	Nicolae Istrate; Adrian Duminicel	56.82	56.90	57.65	—	—
25	Slovakia	Milan Jagnesak; Viktor Rájek	56.81	57.12	57.81	—	—
26	Romania (ROM-2)	Mihai Iliescu; Levente Andrei Bartha	57.22	57.09	57.63	—	—
27	Japan	Suguru Kiyokawa; Ryuichi Kobayashi	57.27	57.02	57.90	—	—
28	Czech Republic (CZE-2)	Milos Vesely; Jan Kobian	56.93	57.49	58.28	—	—
29	Hungary	Marton Gyulai; Bertalan Pinter	57.25	57.36	58.40	—	—
