= Bobsleigh at the 2010 Winter Olympics =

Bobsleigh at the XXI Olympic Winter Games
- Venue: Whistler Sliding Centre
- Dates: February 20–27, 2010
- Competitors: 159 from 23 nations

The bobsleigh competition of the Vancouver 2010 Olympics was held at the Whistler Sliding Centre between 20 and 27 February 2010.

== Medal summary ==
=== Medal table ===
Rank	Nation	Gold	Silver	Bronze	Total
1	Germany	1	2	0	3
2	Canada	1	1	1	3
3	United States	1	0	1	2
4	Russia	0	0	1	1
Totals (4 entries)		3	3	3	9

=== Events ===
Three bobsleigh events were held at Vancouver 2010:

Event	Gold		Silver		Bronze	
Two-man	Germany; André Lange; Kevin Kuske	3:26.65	Germany; Thomas Florschütz; Richard Adjei	3:26.87	Russia; Alexandr Zubkov; Alexey Voyevoda	3:27.51
Four-man	United States; Steve Holcomb; Steve Mesler; Curtis Tomasevicz; Justin Olsen	3:24.46	Germany; André Lange; Kevin Kuske; Alexander Rödiger; Martin Putze	3:24.84	Canada; Lyndon Rush; David Bissett; Lascelles Brown; Chris le Bihan	3:24.85
Two-woman	Canada; Kaillie Humphries; Heather Moyse	3:32.28	Canada; Helen Upperton; Shelley-Ann Brown	3:33.13	United States; Erin Pac; Elana Meyers	3:33.40

== Competition schedule ==
All times are Pacific Standard Time (UTC-8).

Day	Date	Start	Finish	Event	Phase
Day 9	Saturday 2010-02-20	17:00	19:40	Two-Man	Heats 1 and 2
Day 10	Sunday 2010-02-21	13:30	15:50	Two-Man	Heats 3 and 4
Day 12	Tuesday 2010-02-23	17:00	19:00	Women	Heats 1 and 2
Day 13	Wednesday 2010-02-24	17:00	19:00	Women	Heats 3 and 4
Day 15	Friday 2010-02-26	13:00	15:45	Four-Man	Heats 1 and 2
Day 16	Saturday 2010-02-27	13:00	15:25	Four-Man	Heats 3 and 4

== Practice ==
Germany's André Lange had the fastest time in two-man practice on the night of 17 February 2010. There were eight crashes among 57 runs taken that night. Three crashes occurred during the 18 February 2010 two-man training session. Among the crashes in the two-man event were Switzerland's Beat Hefti and Daniel Schmid who both withdrew from the two man event. Meanwhile, Latvia's Janis Minins withdrew due to appendicitis and the emergency surgery that followed on 12 February. Minins returned to competition for the four-man event eleven days later.

Supplemental training was offered on 19 February 2010 to both the two-woman and four-man bobsleigh events out of caution and further preparation for both events that would take place the following week. American bobsledder Shona Rohbock expressed concerns on the 19th that the track could generate speeds that are too dangerous for racing. She stated that she had never experienced speeds at even bobsleigh track she had experienced, event at the St. Moritz track. Officials had told Rohbock that they are considering sanding the runners to slow down the sleds to slow down the speeds. Elana Meyers, an American brakewoman, commented on Twitter that same day that "We (referring to her and her driver Erin Pac) went 145 km/h (90 mph).. that's fast!" One crash occurred on the 19th for the two-woman event when Dutch bobsledder Esme Kamphuis crashed out in the final corners of the track.

Minor changes were made to the track on 22 February 2010 after bobsleigh four-man teams from Latvia and Croatia rolled over in supplementary training. Following a meeting with 11 team captains, training runs were postponed by the FIBT until later that day to adjust the shape of turn 11 so it would be easier for sleds to get through the rest of the track without crashing. FIBT spokesman Don Krone stated that "...some drivers have been experiencing difficulties transitioning from turn 11 to turn 12." As a result, Krone stated that "The FIBT track commission, in conjunction with VANOC and with advice from a number of team captains, are working on the shape of turn 11 to make it easier for drivers to get high enough on 11 to turn 12 so that they can successfully make it through turn 13." Krone also stated that it was common that the profile of corners were changed when it was being used by other sliding disciplines (luge and skeleton).

After track alterations were done on 23 February 2010, the two fastest four-man times were done by Germany's Lange and the United States' Holcomb. Australia withdrew its four-man team on 23 February 2010 to two of its crew members, Duncan Harvey and Duncan Pugh, suffering concussions. Australia chef de mission Ian Chesterman stated that the decision was not taken lightly and was done on the side of safety. Meanwhile, Latvia's Janis Minins returned to practice on the 23rd in the wake of the emergency surgery on 12 February in the wake of an appendicitis attack.

Lange had the fastest practice times on the 24th with the final two practices taking place on the 25th. That same day, Australia withdrew to injuries to Harvey and Pugh of Australia while Edwin van Calker of the Netherlands withdrew to a lack of confidence of driving the four-man sled during the event. This was also despite no crashes during four-man training had taken place prior to the 24th. The Dutch team supported van Calker's decision on this. Minins withdrew from the four-man event on the 25th to crashing twice during practice where one of his crews suffering a concussion and another suffering bruised lungs and elbows.

== Qualifying ==
=== Athlete/NOC quota ===
170 athletes are allowed to compete in accordance with the International Olympic Committee and the International Bobsleigh and Tobogganing Federation (FIBT). This includes 130 for two-man and four-man bobsleigh (30 teams for each type of men's bobsleigh), and 40 for two-woman bobsleigh (20 teams).

=== Qualification system ===
The best result of each driver will be ranked by the FIBT, including World Cup and lesser known Cup. These races scored are the same ones as the World Cup event. These driver must rank among the top 50 in the FIBT for the 2009–10 season by 17 January 2010, held at St. Moritz, Switzerland. For men's bobsleigh, three countries can send three teams, seven countries can send two teams, and seven more countries can send one team (Applies to both two-man and four-man). For women's bobsleigh, two countries can send three teams, four countries can send two teams, and six countries can send one team. For all three events, the host country is included provided they meet the minimum requirements. Each NOC declared their entries on 22 January 2010. Entering the World Cup event in St. Moritz, the top two countries to have three two-woman teams were Germany and the United States. For two-man, the top three countries to have three teams were Germany, Switzerland, and the United States while for four-man, the three countries to have three teams were Germany, Russia, and the United States. This was announced on 20 January 2010. Reallocation was announced on 26 January 2010.

Nations	Two-man	Four-man	Two-woman
Australia	2	1	1
Austria	2	1	0
Belgium	0	0	1
Canada	2	2	2
Croatia	0	1	0
Czech Republic	1	2	0
Germany	3	3	3
Great Britain	1	1	2
Ireland	0	0	1
Italy	2	1	1
Japan	1	1	1
Latvia	2	2	0
Liechtenstein	1	1	0
Monaco	1	0	0
Netherlands	1	1	1
Poland	1	1	0
Romania	1	1	1
Russia	2	3	2
Serbia	0	1	0
South Korea	0	1	0
Slovakia	1	1	0
Switzerland	3	2	2
United States	3	3	3
Total: 23 NOCs	30	30	21 (Note: Following an appeal to the Court of Arbitration for Sport, Australia were awarded an additional spot in the two-woman bobsled competition. The Australian appeal was based on the grounds that Oceania was not represented in the competition.)

Austria declined their second spot in the four men event. Australia takes this spot instead.

== Competing nations ==
The following nations have entered the following number of athletes.

- Australia (7)
- Austria (5)
- Belgium (2)
- Canada (12)
- Croatia (5)
- Czech Republic (8)
- Germany (18)
- Great Britain (8)
- Ireland (2)
- Italy (8)
- Japan (6)
- Latvia (5)
- Liechtenstein (2)
- Monaco (2)
- Netherlands (4)
- Poland (4)
- Romania (6)
- Russia (17)
- Serbia (4)
- Slovakia (4)
- South Korea (4)
- Switzerland (8)
- United States (18)
