= Bo-Dyn Bobsled Project =

Bobsled constructor

Bo-Dyn Bobsled Project, Inc.
- Founded: 1992
- Founder: Geoff Bodine
- Headquarters: Concord, North Carolina, United States
- Key people: Phil Kurze, President
- Website: www.bodynbobsled.com

Bo-Dyn Bobsled Project, Inc. is a bobsled constructor, founded in 1992 by former NASCAR driver and 1986 Daytona 500 winner Geoff Bodine, that collaborates on the design, manufacture and supply of U.S.-built racing sleds for the United States Bobsled and Skeleton Federation (USBSF).

The project is classified as a 501(c)(3) non-profit organization. Its sleds are built in NASCAR Cup Series driver Joey Logano's Huntersville, North Carolina race shop.

== History ==
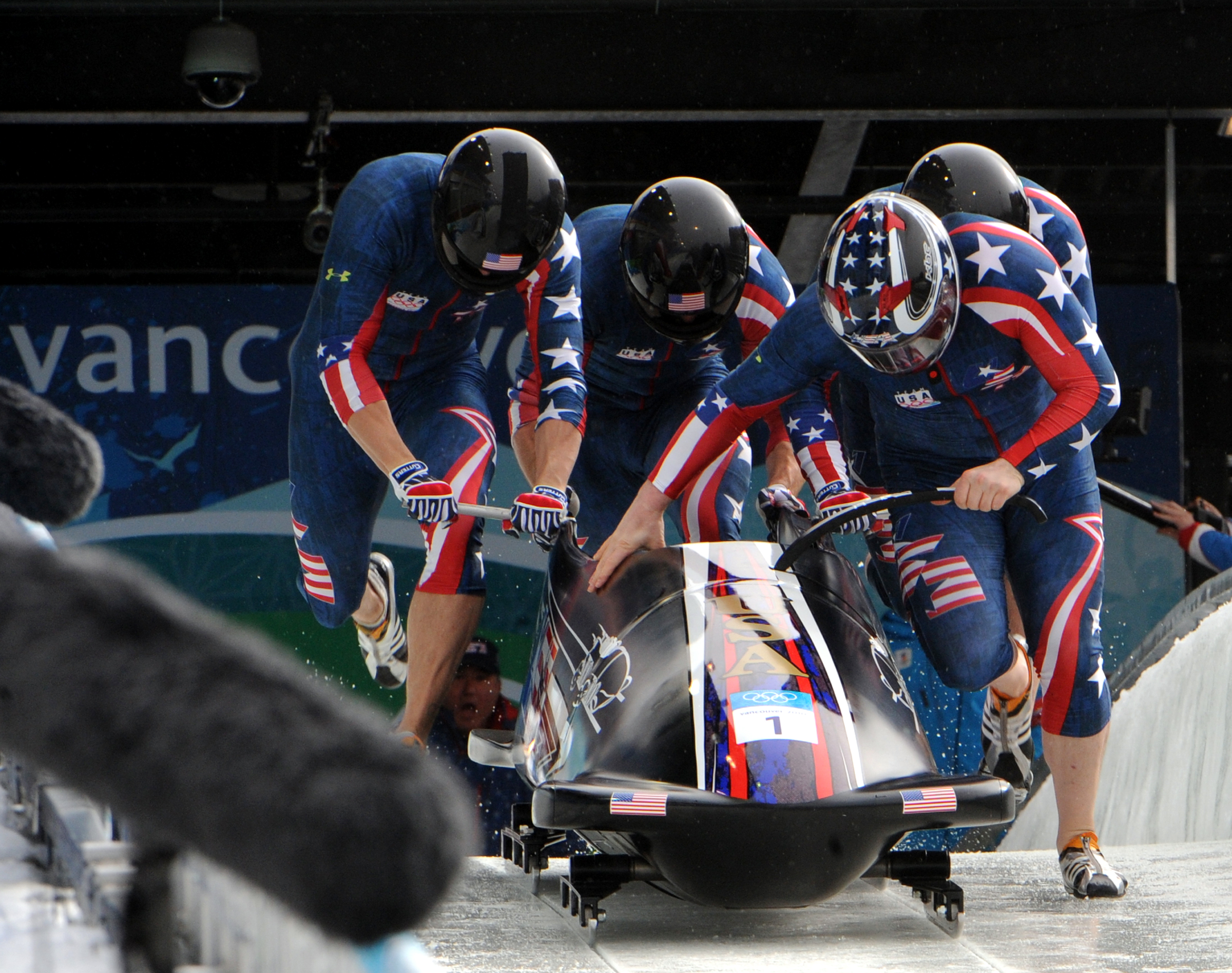
The American bobsled team pushing the "Night Train" sled in the 2010 Winter Olympics

Geoff Bodine was watching the 1992 Winter Olympics when he noticed the American team struggling in the bobsled event. At the time, the United States had not won an Olympic bobsled medal since 1956, and was using substandard sleds imported from Europe. Bodine was invited to Lake Placid to visit the team and take part in demonstration runs. Bodine stated afterwards, "When I heard that our athletes weren't using American-made bobsleds, that was unacceptable." Bodine stated about the project, "I'm glad we did it. No regrets. Not one regret. It's all about 'Made in the USA.' I'm a believer, I love our country . . . and the foundation of our country."

Bodine partnered with race-car builder Bob Cuneo to build sleds. Bodine had recently purchased the assets of AK Racing, and used his leverage and connections as a NASCAR car owner to begin fundraising for the project. The project, known as Bo-Dyn ("Bo" for Bodine, "Dyn" for Chassis Dynamics), started having its sleds used by the U.S. team in 1994.

In 2000, Whelen Engineering Company joined the project as sponsors, while Whelen Vice President Phil Kurze became the project's president the following year.

At the 1998 Winter Olympics in Nagano, Japan, only the program's second Olympics, the US men's four-man team missed out on the bronze medal by a mere 0.02 seconds. At the 2002. Winter Olympics in Salt Lake City, Utah (USA), the team won three bobsled medals: a gold in the women's competition, and silver and bronze in the four-man sled.

The project later constructed the "Night Train" sled, the fastest sled in the world. Kurze stated that Night Train cost more than $250,000 to build. In the 2010 Winter Olympics, the United States used the sled to win its first gold medal since 1948. When asked about the win, Bodine stated,

Winning the Daytona 500 is NASCAR's biggest race. When you win that, it's a great feeling. But the Olympics is worldwide competition. It's incredible. I didn't get a trophy and I didn't get any money for it, but seeing those gold medals hanging on those four athletes felt pretty darn good. To know the whole country was cheering for them felt pretty darn special.

On April 30, 2011, Bo-Dyn and the USBSF ended its partnership due to intellectual property disagreements, and BMW became the new bobsled provider. Subsequent litigation between the two parties was dropped in 2013. The same year, Bo-Dyn began working on the Night Train 2, which was designed using carbon fiber instead of Kevlar and fiberglass, as carbon fiber provides improved weight distribution. Night Train 2 was used by the U. S. team in the 2014 Winter Olympics.

Bo-Dyn served as Bodine's sponsor in the E-Z-GO 200 Camping World Truck Series race in 2010.

== Geoff Bodine Bobsled Challenge ==
From 2006 to 2010, the Geoff Bodine Bobsled Challenge was held, with funds raised going to the Bo-Dyn project. Various NASCAR drivers entered the event, along with NHRA drivers. The inaugural event in 2006 was won by Boris Said along with his brakeman Ryan Johnston; Said would go on to win the 2007 and 2008 events as well while Todd Bodine and Morgan Lucas won the next challenge. The 2010 challenge was won by Joey Logano. On December 21, 2010, it was announced that the challenge would be discontinued.

== Results ==
=== Olympics ===
Event	Two-man	Four-man	Two-woman
(Norway) 1994 Lillehammer	13th 14th (Details)	15th DNF (Details)	—
(Japan) 1998 Nagano	7th (Details)	5th (Details)	—
(United States) 2002 Salt Lake	4th 9th (Details)	2nd 3rd (Details)	1st 5th (Details)
(Italy) 2006 Torino	7th 14th (Details)	6th 7th (Details)	2nd 6th (Details)
(Canada) 2010 Vancouver	6th 10th (Details)	1st 13th (Details)	3rd 5th 6th (Details)

=== Bobsleigh World Cup ===
- Combined men's
  - Gold: 2006–07
  - Silver: 1996–97
  - Bronze: 2003–04, 2005–06, 2007–08, 2010–11
- Two-man
  - Gold: 2006–07
  - Bronze: 1996–97, 2005–06
- Four-man
  - Gold: 2009–10
  - Silver: 2006–07, 2010–11
  - Bronze: 2003–04
- Two-woman
  - Gold: 1999–00, 2000–01
  - Silver: 1998–99, 1999–00, 2003–04, 2006–07
  - Bronze: 2000–01, 2001–02, 2005–06
