= Bobsleigh at the 2006 Winter Olympics =

Bobsleigh at the XX Olympic Winter Games
- Venue: Cesana Pariol
- Dates: 17–26 February 2006
- Competitors: 150 from 22 nations

Three bobsleigh events were competed at the 2006 Winter Olympics, at the Cesana Pariol venue. The competition took place between February 17 and February 26, 2006.

The events used the newly built Cesana Pariol track measuring 1435 metres with 19 curves, a vertical change of 114 metres, and an approximate top speed of 130 kilometres per hour.

Competitions comprised four heats. Teams raced in the first and third heats in the order of the draw. The second heat was raced in order of ranking after the first heat, and the fourth heat is raced in order of the ranking after the first three heats. Total time for the four heats determined the final rank.

== Qualification ==
The qualification was based on the results of pilots, with other members of a bobsleigh crew being selected by their National Olympic Committees. In the two man event, the top 22 pilots from the World Cup 2005–2006 season, the top four from the European Challenge Cup, and the top two from the North American Challenge Cup all qualified, subject to limits on number of crews per NOC. The four man event qualification was identical except that the World Cup season qualifies only 20 pilots. The two-woman event allowed the top 15 pilots from the World Cup 2005–2006 season. NOCs may not have selected other pilots than those who were within the qualifying limits, though if more than two pilots have qualified the selection was made by each individual NOC.

The host nation is guaranteed at least one crew in each event. In addition, all five of the Olympic continents must be represented, with at least one crew in a men's event and one crew in the two woman event. Each nation is limited to two bobsleighs in each event.

== Medal summary ==
=== Medal table ===
Rank	Nation	Gold	Silver	Bronze	Total
1	Germany	3	0	0	3
2	Canada	0	1	0	1
2	Russia	0	1	0	1
2	United States	0	1	0	1
5	Switzerland	0	0	2	2
6	Italy	0	0	1	1
Totals (6 entries)		3	3	3	9

=== Events ===
Event	Gold		Silver		Bronze	
Two-man	Germany (GER-1); André Lange; Kevin Kuske	3:43.38	Canada (CAN-1); Pierre Lueders; Lascelles Brown	3:43.59	Switzerland (SUI-1); Martin Annen; Beat Hefti	3:43.73
Four-man	Germany (GER-1); André Lange; René Hoppe; Kevin Kuske; Martin Putze	3:40.42	Russia (RUS-1); Alexandre Zoubkov; Philippe Egorov; Alexei Seliverstov; Alexey Voevoda	3:40.55	Switzerland (SUI-1); Martin Annen; Thomas Lamparter; Beat Hefti; Cédric Grand	3:40.83
Two-woman	Germany (GER-1); Sandra Kiriasis; Anja Schneiderheinze	3:49.98	United States (USA-1); Shauna Rohbock; Valerie Fleming	3:50.69	Italy (ITA-1); Gerda Weissensteiner; Jennifer Isacco	3:51.01

== Participating NOCs ==
Twenty-three nations contributed bobsleighs to the events.

- Australia (4)
- Austria (5)
- Brazil (4)
- Canada (12)
- Croatia (4)
- Czech Republic (5)
- France (5)
- Germany (14)
- Great Britain (6)
- Hungary (4)
- Ireland (12)
- Italy (12)
- Japan (4)
- Latvia (9)
- Monaco (2)
- Netherlands (8)
- New Zealand (4)
- Poland (4)
- Romania (6)
- Russia (11)
- Slovakia (4)
- Switzerland (12)
- United States (12)
