= Rüegg =

Rüegg is a Swiss surname:

- Alfred Rüegg (1934–2010), Swiss cyclist
- Annelise Rüegg (1879–1934), Swiss pacifist and writer
- Anny Rüegg (born 1912), Swiss alpine skier
- Dominique Rüegg (born 1996), Swiss ice hockey player
- Erika Rüegg (born 1952), Swiss swimmer
- Helena Rüegg (born 1959), German bandoneon player, actress and author
- Ivo Rüegg (born 1971), Swiss bobsledder
- Kevin Rüegg (born 1998), Swiss footballer
- Lukas Rüegg (born 1996), Swiss cyclist
- Mathias Rüegg (born 1952), Swiss musician
- Markus Rüegg (born 1959), Swiss neurobiologist
- Max Rüegg, Swiss bobsledder
- Noemi Rüegg (born 2001), Swiss racing cyclist
- Ralph Rüegg (born 1973), Swiss bobsledder
- Timon Rüegg (born 1996), Swiss cyclist
- Tony Rüegg, Swiss bobsledder
- Yvonne Rüegg (born 1938), Swiss alpine skier
- Dr. Texas Rüegg (born 1975), Owner & Brewmeister of Rüeggenbach Brewing Co. in Marshall, TX
