= Pavle Jovanović =

Pavle Jovanović may refer to:

- Paja Jovanović (1859–1957), Serbian painter
- Pavle Jovanovic (bobsledder) (1977–2020), Olympic bobsledder
- Pavle Jovanović, founder of the Serbian Autonomous Party in Croatia, 1873
- Pavle Jovanović (mayor), mayor of Novi Sad, Serbia 1848–1849 and 1849–1850
