= Ken Kotyk =

Canadian bobsledder (born 1981)

Ken Kotyk, OLY
- Ken Kotyk, OLY

Personal information
- Nationality: (Canada) Canadian
- Born: February 7, 1981 (age 45) Canora, Saskatchewan
- Education: B.Sc. Kin/B.Ed. Physical Education and Science, University of Saskatchewan (Associate Alumnus)
- Occupations: Strength & Conditioning Coach
- Height: 1.84 m (6 ft 0 in)
- Weight: 96.16 kg (212.0 lb)

Sport
- Country: Canada
- Sport: Bobsleigh

Achievements and titles
- Olympic finals: 4th
Medal record
Men's Bobsleigh
Representing Canada
World Championships
| Silver medal – second place | 2007 St. Moritz | Four-man |
| Bronze medal – third place | 2005 Calgary | Four-man |

Kenneth Alfred Kotyk, OLY (born February 7, 1981) is a Canadian former Olympic bobsledder and athletic performance coach. A brakeman in four-man bobsleigh, Kotyk competed internationally from 2003 to 2010, representing Canada at the 2006 Winter Olympics in Turin, Italy, where he finished fourth. He earned a silver medal at the 2007 FIBT World Championships and a bronze at the 2005 FIBT World Championships, and accumulated twelve Bobsleigh World Cup podium finishes, primarily alongside driver Pierre Lueders.

== Early life and education ==
Kotyk was born on February 7, 1981, in Canora, Saskatchewan, and grew up on the family grain farm in nearby Rama, Saskatchewan. The Kotyk family is of Ukrainian descent. Life on the farm instilled a physical work ethic from an early age, involving tasks such as shovelling grain and hauling equipment. As a teenager in 1996, Kotyk watched Donovan Bailey win Olympic gold and told his parents he aspired to become an Olympian.

He attended the University of Saskatchewan, where he studied kinesiology, physical education, and science. During his time at the university, Kotyk competed as a sprinter in track and field and played volleyball on the Huskies teams, and also had involvement in Huskies football and shot put. His sprint speed, particularly in short 30-metre accelerations, was noted by coaches as a standout attribute.

== Bobsleigh career ==
=== Entry and development (2003–2005) ===
Kotyk entered bobsleigh in 2003 after his track coach, Todd Johnson, recommended him following a scouting call from Bobsleigh Canada Skeleton seeking athletes with explosive sprinting ability for push-athlete roles. He attended a tryout camp in Calgary and earned a spot on the national team.

He made his international debut as a brakeman in the four-man event during the 2003–04 Bobsleigh World Cup season, joining driver Pierre Lueders alongside push athletes Al Hough and Giulio Zardo for the opener in Altenberg, Germany, on December 21, 2003, where the team finished fourth. By the 2004–05 season, he had progressed to regular World Cup participation, competing consistently with Lueders' crew across European tracks.

=== Olympic Games ===
At the 2006 Winter Olympics in Turin, Italy, Kotyk served as brakeman for the Canada 1 sled in the four-man event alongside Lueders, Morgan Alexander, and Lascelles Brown, finishing fourth with a combined time of 3:40.92. The team placed 0.23 seconds behind the bronze medallists.

=== World Championships ===
Kotyk earned two medals at the FIBT World Championships:

- 2005 (Calgary): Bronze medal in the four-man event alongside Lueders, Alexander, and Brown. The crew also set the Canadian track record on the second run at Canada Olympic Park.
- 2007 (St. Moritz): Silver medal in the four-man event with Lueders, David Bissett, and Brown, finishing 0.23 seconds behind the German crew led by André Lange.

=== World Cup ===
Kotyk accumulated twelve Bobsleigh World Cup podium finishes between 2003 and 2010, including four victories. Notable results included a victory in Königssee, Germany, on February 25, 2007, where the crew edged the United States by 0.09 seconds, and a win in Cortina d'Ampezzo, Italy, on January 13, 2008, with a two-run time of 1:47.95.

His World Cup podiums spanned venues including St. Moritz, Königssee, Cortina d'Ampezzo, Calgary, Cesana, Park City, and Lake Placid.

Olympic, World Championship, and World Cup results
| Event | Year | Location | Result | Team |
|---|---|---|---|---|
| World Cup (Four-man) | 2003 | Cortina d'Ampezzo, ITA | Silver | Canada 1 (Lueders) |
| Europa Cup (Two-man) | 2004 | St. Moritz, SUI | Silver | Canada |
| World Championships (Four-man) | 2005 | Calgary, CAN | Bronze | Canada 1 (Lueders, Kotyk, Alexander, Brown) |
| World Cup (Four-man) | 2005 | St. Moritz, SUI | Gold | Canada 1 (Lueders) |
| World Cup (Four-man) | 2005 | Cesana, ITA | Silver | Canada 1 (Lueders) |
| World Cup (Four-man) | 2005 | Cortina d'Ampezzo, ITA | Bronze | Canada 1 (Lueders) |
| Winter Olympics (Four-man) | 2006 | Turin, ITA | 4th | Canada 1 (Lueders, Kotyk, Alexander, Brown) |
| World Cup (Four-man) | 2006 | Königssee, GER | Gold | Canada 1 (Lueders) |
| World Cup (Four-man) | 2006 | St. Moritz, SUI | Silver | Canada 1 (Lueders) |
| World Championships (Four-man) | 2007 | St. Moritz, SUI | Silver | Canada 1 (Lueders, Kotyk, Bissett, Brown) |
| World Cup (Four-man) | 2007 | Königssee, GER | Gold | Canada 1 (Lueders) |
| World Cup (Four-man) | 2007 | Calgary, CAN | Bronze | Canada 1 (Lueders) |
| World Cup (Four-man) | 2007 | Cortina d'Ampezzo, ITA | Bronze | Canada 1 (Lueders) |
| World Cup (Four-man) | 2008 | Cortina d'Ampezzo, ITA | Gold | Canada 1 (Lueders) |
| World Cup (Four-man) | 2008 | Park City, USA | Bronze | Canada 1 (Lueders) |
| World Cup (Four-man) | 2008 | Lake Placid, USA | Bronze | Canada 1 (Lueders) |
| Europa Cup (Four-man) | 2010 | Cesana, ITA | Gold | Canada |

=== Teammates ===
Throughout his career, Kotyk pushed alongside several notable Canadian bobsledders under driver Pierre Lueders, including Morgan Alexander, Lascelles Brown, David Bissett, Justin Kripps, Giulio Zardo, Florian Linder, and Marty Robertson.

=== Records ===
Ken Kotyk in 2025

Kotyk holds the Canadian bobsleigh push-start record, set at Canada Olympic Park in Calgary in 2005. During the 2005 FIBT World Championships, his crew with Lueders, Alexander, and Brown also set a track record on the second run of the four-man competition at Canada Olympic Park.

=== Retirement ===
Kotyk retired from the national team in 2010, citing the cumulative physical toll of the sport, including chronic hip bursitis, as well as the training demands and growing family responsibilities.

== Honours and awards ==
- Commemorative Medal for the Centennial of Saskatchewan (May 2005)
- Certificate of Recognition from the World Olympians Association
- Named one of Canada's Top Fitness Trainers by Impact Magazine (2026)

== Post-competition career ==
After retiring in 2010, Kotyk began coaching at The Athlete Factory in Calgary. In 2014, he joined Talisman Centre—later renamed MNP Community & Sport Centre—as head trainer and strength and conditioning coach, a position he held for nearly nine years until February 2023. During his tenure at MNP, he was nominated for Impact Magazine's Canada's Top Fitness Trainer award in 2020 and 2022.

In 2023, Kotyk founded Kotyk Athletic Performance, an independent coaching business in Calgary specialising in strength and conditioning. He was also recruited as director of the Wolves Den facility and student athletic mentor at West Island College in Calgary. He has contributed as a fitness writer to Impact Magazine, authoring articles on strength training for runners.

=== Attempted comeback (2025) ===
In 2025, Kotyk attempted a return to competition at age 44, aiming to qualify for Canada's four-man bobsleigh team at the 2026 Winter Olympics in Milano Cortina. His motivation centred on his fourth-place finish at the 2006 Olympics, where his team had missed bronze by 0.23 seconds. In a September 2025 National Post article on the Enhanced Games, Kotyk expressed opposition to the use of performance-enhancing substances, affirming his commitment to competing clean. He did not qualify for Canada's 2026 Olympic bobsleigh team.

== Personal life ==
Kotyk is the father of two daughters and resides in Calgary, Alberta.
