= Amanda Stepenko =

Canadian bobsledder (born 1980)

Amanda Stepenko (born October 4, 1980) is a Canadian bobsledder who competed from 2002 to 2010. Her best finish in the Bobsleigh World Cup was sixth in the two-woman event at Lake Placid in December 2006.

At the 2007 FIBT World Championships in St. Moritz, Stepenko finished fourth in the mixed bobsleigh-skeleton team event and 13th in the two-woman event. Stepenko also finished 11th at the 2009 FIBT World Championships in Lake Placid

Stepenko also finished 3rd in the 2008 Europa Cup race in Winterberg, Germany, and then followed it up with a 1st-place finish with brakeman Veronique Fortin at the 2008 Europa cup race in Altenberg, Germany.

Stepenko finished the 2009/2010 Bobsleigh World Cup ranked 10th overall in the world after a 7th-place finish in her last race in Igls, Austria
