= Morgan Alexander (bobsleigh) =

Canadian bobsledder

Personal information
- National team: Canada
- Born: February 19, 1982 (age 44) Regina, Saskatchewan, Canada
- Height: 1.82 m (5 ft 11 1/2 in)
- Weight: 92–96 kg (203–212 lb)

Sport
- Sport: Bobsleigh
- Event: Four-man
- Retired: 2006
Medal record
Bobsleigh
Representing Canada
World Championships
Bronze medal – third place	2005 Calgary	Four-man

Morgan Alexander (born February 19, 1982) is a Canadian former bobsledder and current sports administrator. He represented Canada in international competition during the mid-2000s, most notably as a member of the four-man team that won a bronze medal at the 2005 FIBT World Championships in Calgary and finished fourth at the 2006 Winter Olympics in Turin.

Since retiring from competition, Alexander has served as High Performance Manager for Bobsleigh Canada Skeleton.

== Early life ==
Alexander was born on February 19, 1982, in Regina, Saskatchewan. He grew up in the provincial capital, in Canada's prairie region, where a strong culture of winter sports and outdoor activities is fostered by the harsh climate.

== Bobsleigh career ==
=== Early competitions (2002–2004) ===
Alexander began his international bobsleigh career during the 2002–03 World Cup season, competing as a crew member on pilot Jayson Krause's four-man sled. The team, which also included Mark LeBlanc and brakeman Florian Linder, was ranked 14th in the four-man standings as of January 2003.

At the World Cup four-man event in St. Moritz, Switzerland, on January 26, 2003, Krause's sled finished 15th out of 22 entrants with a combined two-run time of 2:12.65. Throughout 2003 and 2004, Alexander continued racing in World Cup and continental events, gradually improving alongside emerging Canadian crews.

=== 2005 World Championships ===
Alexander achieved his career highlight at the 2005 FIBT World Championships, held at Canada Olympic Park in Calgary from February 18 to 27. Competing in the four-man event, he served as a push athlete on the team piloted by veteran driver Pierre Lueders, alongside Ken Kotyk and Lascelles Brown as brakeman.

Over four runs, the crew posted a combined time of 3:43.86, finishing 0.33 seconds behind gold medallists André Lange's German squad and 0.05 seconds behind Alexandr Zubkov's silver-medal Russian team, to claim the bronze medal. The result was Alexander's most significant international achievement.

=== 2006 Winter Olympics ===
Alexander competed in the four-man bobsleigh event at the 2006 Winter Olympics in Turin, Italy, again crewing for pilot Lueders alongside Kotyk and Brown. The event was held over two days (February 24–25) at the Cesana Pariol sliding centre, featuring four runs on a 1,435-metre (4,708 ft) track with 19 curves and a 114-metre (374 ft) vertical drop.

The Canadian sled finished fourth with a combined time of 3:40.92, just 0.09 seconds behind the bronze-medal Swiss team and 0.50 seconds off the gold-medal pace set by Germany. The top five sleds were separated by only 0.62 seconds. The result was the culmination of Alexander's competitive career.

== Post-competitive career ==
=== Coaching ===
Following the 2006 Olympics, Alexander retired from active competition. He maintained ties to the sport through athlete development initiatives and transitioned into coaching roles with Bobsleigh Canada Skeleton. By the 2017–18 season, he was coaching provincial programs, including those in Saskatchewan, in preparation for the PyeongChang Olympics.

=== High Performance Manager ===
Alexander assumed the role of High Performance Manager for Bobsleigh Canada Skeleton in 2018 and continues in the position As of 2024. In this role, he oversees athlete development, team selection, performance optimization, and recruitment.

A key initiative under his leadership was the 2019 launch of the #Tracking2022 national recruitment drive, a coast-to-coast series of camps evaluating potential athletes aged 18 and older from sports such as football, track and field, and rowing.

He contributed to Canada's preparations for both the 2018 Winter Olympics and the Beijing 2022 Winter Olympics, supporting medal successes at both Games.
