= Vencill =

Vencill may refer to:

- Kicker Vencill, American swimmer
- 13717 Vencill, main-belt asteroid
