= Rozītis =

Family name

Origin
- Origin: Latvian

Rozītis (Old orthography: Rosi(h)t; feminine: Rozīte) is a Latvian surname. Individuals with the surname include:

- Jānis Rozītis (1913–1942), Latvian football forward
- Pāvils Rozītis (1889–1937), Latvian writer, journalist and translator
- Reinis Rozītis (born 1982), Latvian bobsledder
