= Ainārs =

- Gender: Male

Origin
- Region of origin: Latvia

Other names
- Related names: Aina

Ainārs is a Latvian masculine given name and may refer to:

- Ainārs Bagatskis (born 1967), Latvian basketball player and coach.
- Ainars Baštiks (born 1958), Latvian politician.
- Ainārs Juškēvičs (born 1981), Latvian floorball player.
- Ainārs Ķiksis (born 1972), Latvian cyclist.
- Ainārs Kovals (born 1981), Latvian javelin thrower and Olympic medalist.
- Ainārs Podnieks (born 1980), Latvian bobsledder.
- Ainārs Podziņš (born 1992), Latvian ice hockey player.
- Ainārs Šlesers (born 1970), Latvian businessman and politician.
- Ainars Zvirgzdiņš (born 1959), Latvian basketball coach.
