= Santarsiero =

Santarsiero is a surname. Notable people with this surname include:

- Danilo Santarsiero (born 1979), Italian bobsledder
- Steve Santarsiero (born 1965), American politician
- Vito Santarsiero (born 1955), Italian politician
- Michael C Santarsiero (born 1962) American Rock vocalist
