= Isabel Baumann =

Swiss bobsledder (born 1978)

Isabel Baumann (born 19 August 1978) is a Swiss bobsledder who has competed since 2002. Her best finish in the Bobsleigh World Cup was seventh in the two-woman event at Altenberg in January.

Bauman's best finish at the FIBT World Championships was 12th in the two-woman event at St. Moritz in 2007.
