= Ivan Giordani =

Italian bobsledder (born 1973)

Ivan Giordani (born 11August 22 1973) is an Italian bobsleigher who has competed since 2002. His best Bobsleigh World Cup finish was third in the two-man event at Lake Placid in December 2006.

Giordani also finished 19th in the four-man event at the 2007 FIBT World Championships in St. Moritz.
