= Alevtina Kovalenko =

Russian bobsledder (born 1980)

Alevtina Kovalenko (born 9 September 1980) is a Russian bobsledder who has competed since 2005. Her best finish in the Bobsleigh World Cup was fifth in the two-woman event at Winterberg in February 2007.

Kovalenko's best finish at the FIBT World Championships was ninth in the two-woman event at St. Moritz in 2007.
