= Ralph Rüegg =

Swiss bobsledder (born 1973)

Ralph Rüegg (born 23 May 1973) is a Swiss bobsledder who competed from 1998 to 2006. He is best known for his third-place finish in the four-man event of the Bobsleigh World Cup championship in 2002-3.

Rüegg's best finish in the FIBT World Championships was sixth in the four-man event at Calgary in 2005. In addition he won a bronze medal at the 2003 Bobsleigh European Championship in the two-man event, with Beat Hefti as his brakeman.

He is the son of Tony Rüegg, nephew of Max Rüegg and cousin of Reto and Ivo Rüegg, all of whom competed as bobsledders.
