= Jamie Cruickshank =

Canadian bobsledder

Jaime Boyer (née Cruickshank; born January 4, 1986) is a Canadian Olympic bobsledder who competed in the sport from 2004–08. Her best finish in the Bobsleigh World Cup was second in the two-woman event at Lake Placid in December 2006.

She finished fourth in the mixed bobsleigh-skeleton team event at the 2007 FIBT World Championships in St. Moritz.

She also finished 13th in the two-woman event at the 2006 Winter Olympics in Turin.

Jaime had since decided to retire from the Canadian World Cup Bobsleigh team in late 2008.
