= Gatis Gūts =

Latvian bobsledder (born 1976)

Gatis Gūts (born 15 April 1976, Ventspils) is a former Latvian bobsleigh pilot who had competed since 1994. Currently he is one of the coaches of Latvian bobsleigh team. His two last seasons have seen him twice in the top ten in the World Cup, both times with co-pilot Intars Dīcmanis. He also competed at the 10 World Championships.Best result in World Championships in Lake Placid 2003 where he and Intars Dīcmanis finished 5th in two man sled. Best World Cup in 4man was fourth.

Gūts competed in two Winter Olympics, earning his best finish of 12th in the four-man event at Salt Lake City in 2002. He retired after the 2006 Winter Olympics.
