= Mirko Turri =

Italian bobsledder (born 1981)

Mirko Turri (born 29 June 1981 in Verona) is an Italian bobsledder who competed from 2003 to 2007. His best Bobsleigh World Cup finish was third in the two-man event at Lake Placid in December 2006.

Turri also finished 19th in the four-man event at the 2007 FIBT World Championships in St. Moritz.

He also finished tied for ninth in the four-man event at the 2010 Winter Olympics in Vancouver.
