= Andreas Porth =

German bobsledder (born 1984)

Andreas Porth (born 21 March 1984) is a German bobsledder who competed from 2005 to 2007. His best Bobsleigh World Cup finish was second in the two-man event twice in the 2006-07 World Cup season.
