= Yevgeni Sergeyevich Popov =

Russian bobsledder (born 1977)

Medal record

Men's Bobsleigh

Representing Russia

World Cup Championships
Gold medal – first place	2006-07	Four-man

Yevgeni Sergeyevich Popov (Russian: Евгений Серге́евич Попов) (born 27 November 1977 in Krasnoyarsk) is a Russian bobsledder who has competed since 1996. Competing in four Winter Olympics, he earned his best finish of eighth twice (two-man: 2002, four-man: 2010).

At the FIBT World Championships, Popov earned his best finish of sixth in the four-man event at St. Moritz in 2007.

He won the Bobsleigh World Cup championship in the four-man event in 2006-07.
