= Shauna Rohbock =

American bobsledder and soccer player (born 1977)

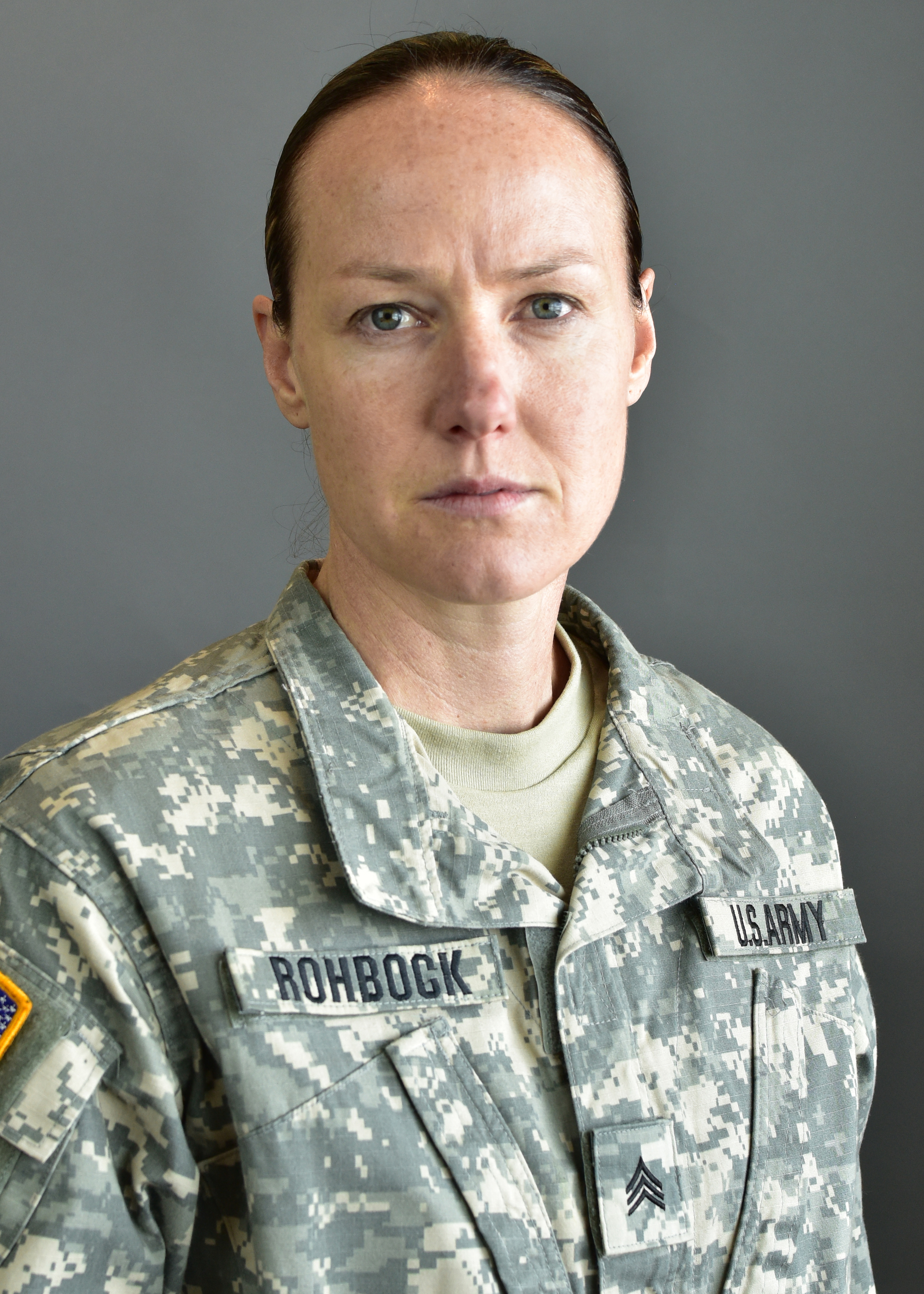
- SSG Rohbock in 2017
- Born: Shauna Linn Rohbock; April 4, 1977 (age 49); Provo, Utah, U.S.
- Education: Brigham Young University (BS, 1999)
- Height: 5 ft 8 in (1.73 m)
- Children: 2
- Bobsleigh career
- Weight: 150 lb (68 kg)
- Country: United States
- Position: Driver
- Events: Two-woman; mixed team
- Career start: 1999
- Retired: 2011
Medal record
Bobsleigh
Representing the United States
Olympic Games
Silver medal – second place	2006 Turin	Two-woman
World Championships
Silver medal – second place	2009 Lake Placid	Two-woman
Silver medal – second place	2011 Königssee	Two-woman
Bronze medal – third place	2005 Calgary	Two-woman
Bronze medal – third place	2007 St. Moritz	Two-woman
Bronze medal – third place	2009 Lake Placid	Mixed team
Soccer career
- Position: Forward
Youth career
- –1995: Mountain View Bruins
College career
Years	Team	Apps	(Gls)
1995–1998	BYU Cougars	90	(94)
Senior career*
Years	Team	Apps	(Gls)
2002–2003	San Diego Spirit	16	(2)
International career
1998	United States	1	(0)
- * Club domestic league appearances and goals
- Military career
- Allegiance: United States
- Branch: United States Army
- Service years: 2000–present
- Rank: Staff sergeant
- Units: Utah Army National Guard; U.S. Army World Class Athlete Program

Shauna Linn Rohbock (born April 4, 1977) is an American retired bobsledder and professional soccer player, now a staff sergeant in the Utah Army National Guard. She won an Olympic medal in two-woman bobsleigh competition. After retiring from competitions, she worked as a bobsled coach at the Utah Olympic Park.

== Early life ==
Rohbock was raised in Orem, Utah, and is a graduate of Orem's Mountain View High School and Brigham Young University, where she studied recreation management. She graduated from BYU with a Bachelor of Science in 1999. She is the middle child among seven siblings, and has five sisters and one brother. Rohbock is a member of the Church of Jesus Christ of Latter-day Saints.

While attending college, she set several BYU Cougars women's soccer records, scoring 95 goals in 368 shots during her 90-game career there. Her 95 goals places her sixth (as of 2006) on the NCAA career scoring list.

Rohbock was also an All-American combined events athlete for the BYU Cougars track and field team, placing 8th in the women's heptathlon at the 1997 NCAA Division I Outdoor Track and Field Championships.

In 2000 she joined the Utah Army National Guard and became a member of the National Guard Outstanding Athlete Program.

== Soccer career ==
At the professional level, she played for the San Diego Spirit of the Women's United Soccer Association in 2003.

== Bobsleigh career ==
Rohbock competed in the bobsled at the 2006 Winter Olympics in Turin, winning silver in the two-woman event with teammate Valerie Fleming. Rohbock's best overall finish in the Bobsleigh World Cup was second in 2006–2007 with Fleming. She won her first career World Cup win at the Calgary race, followed by a second win at the World Cup held at Park City, Utah on December 8, 2006. She delivered a 48.73 second run that shattered the Park City track record previously set by Jill Bakken in 2002. Rohbock and Fleming has also won bronze medals at the World Championships in 2005 and 2007. Rohbock has competed in bobsled since 1999. At the 2009 world championships in Lake Placid, New York, she won a silver medal in the two-woman event with Elana Meyers, then won a bronze in the mixed team event.

Rohbock was named to the US Olympic team for the 2010 Winter Olympics on January 16, 2010, where she finished sixth in the two-woman event.

She coached the Brazilian men's bobsled team at the 2018 Winter Olympics, a role she combined with a position as part of the coaching team for the United States squad.

In May 2018, President Donald Trump appointed Rohbock to be a member of his Council on Sports, Fitness & Nutrition.

=== Career highlights ===
Olympic Winter Games
2006 – Turin, (silver) 2nd with Valerie Fleming
World Championships
2005 – Calgary, (bronze) 3rd with Valerie Fleming
2007 – St. Moritz, (bronze) 3rd with Valerie Fleming
2009 – Lake Placid, (silver) 2nd with Elana Meyers
World Cup

2004/2005 – Altenberg, (bronze) 3rd with Erin Pac
2004/2005 – Igls, (bronze) 3rd with Valerie Fleming
2004/2005 – Cesana, (silver) 2nd with Valerie Fleming
2005/2006 – Calgary, (silver) 2nd with Valerie Fleming
2005/2006 – Lake Placid, (bronze) 3rd with Valerie Fleming
2006/2006 – Igls, (bronze) 3rd with Valerie Fleming
2006/2006 – Cortina d'Ampezzo, (bronze) 3rd with Valerie Fleming
2006/2007 – Calgary, (gold) 1st with Valerie Fleming
2006/2007 – Park City, (gold) 1st with Valerie Fleming
2006/2007 – Lake Placid, (bronze) 3rd with Valerie Fleming
2006/2007 – Igls, (silver) 2nd with Valerie Fleming
2006/2007 – Cesana, (silver) 2nd with Valerie Fleming
2006/2007 – Winterberg, (silver) 2nd with Valerie Fleming
2006/2007 – Königssee, (silver) 2nd with Valerie Fleming
2007/2008 – Park City, (bronze) 3rd with Valerie Fleming
2007/2008 – Cesana, (silver) 2nd with Valerie Fleming
2007/2008 – Winterberg, (bronze) 3rd with Valerie Fleming
2008/2009 – Altenberg, (bronze) 3rd with Elana Meyers
2008/2009 – Igls, (silver) 2nd with Valerie Fleming
2008/2009 – Königssee, (gold) 1st with Valerie Fleming
2008/2009 – Whistler, (gold) 1st with Elana Meyers

== Personal life ==
Rohbock is no longer married to former spouse Valerie Fleming and has two children.
