= Tommy Herzog =

Swiss bobsledder (born 1977)

Medal record

Bobsleigh

World Championships
Silver medal – second place	2007 St. Moritz	Two-man

Tommy Herzog (born 25 March 1977) is a Swiss bobsledder who has competed since 1999. He won a silver medal in the two-man event at the 2007 FIBT World Championships in St. Moritz.

In September and October 2008, Herzog tested positive for testosterone twice in doping tests and was subsequently banned for two years.
