= Martin Annen =

Swiss bobsledder (born 1974)

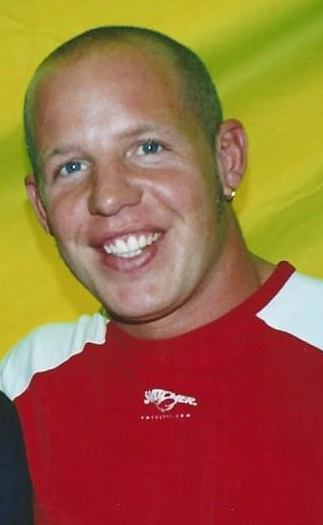

Medal record

Men's Bobsleigh

Representing Switzerland

Olympic Games
Bronze medal – third place	2002 Salt Lake City	Two-man
Bronze medal – third place	2006 Turin	Two-man
Bronze medal – third place	2006 Turin	Four-man

World Championships
Bronze medal – third place	2001 St. Moritz	Two-man
Bronze medal – third place	2005 Calgary	Two-man

World Cup Championships
Gold medal – first place	2000–01	Two-man
Gold medal – first place	2001–02	Combined
Gold medal – first place	2001–02	Two-man
Gold medal – first place	2001–02	Four-man
Gold medal – first place	2004–05	Combined
Gold medal – first place	2004–05	Two-man
Silver medal – second place	2000–01	Combined
Silver medal – second place	2004–05	Four-man
Bronze medal – third place	2002–03	Combined
Bronze medal – third place	2005–06	Four-man
Bronze medal – third place	2006–07	Four-man

Martin Annen (born 12 February 1974) is a bobsledder who competed from 1996 to 2006. Competing in two Winter Olympics, Annen won a total of three bronze medals (Two-man: 2002, 2006; Four-man: 2006).

Annen also won two bronze medals in the two-man event at the FIBT World Championships, earning them in 2001 and 2005.

In Bobsleigh World Cup, he has two combined men's championships (2001-2, 2004–5), three two-man championships (2000-1, 2001–2, 2004–5), and one four-man championship (2001–2).

His children Debora and Tim are also both bobsledders, and both competed at the 2026 Winter Olympics.
