= Stéphane Galbert =

French bobsledder

Stéphane Galbert (born February 7, 1975, in Schœlcher, Martinique) is a member of the French bobsleigh team that competed at the 2006 Winter Olympics.
