= Duncan Harvey (bobsleigh) =

Australian bobsledder

Personal information
- Born: 12 March 1981 (age 44) Mount Gambier, South Australia
- Height: 183 cm (6 ft 0 in) (2014)
- Weight: 102 kg (225 lb) (2014)

Sport
- Country: Australia
- Sport: Bobsleigh
- Event(s): Fourman Men, Twoman Men
- Updated on 6 February 2014

Duncan Harvey (born 12 March 1981) is an Australian bobsledder who competed since 2008. He finished 29th in the two-man event at the FIBT World Championships 2009 in Lake Placid, New York.

Harvey competed in many lesser events prior to the 2010 Winter Olympics, earning his best finish of third twice.

He was selected to compete at the 2010 Winter Olympics in the four-man event, but withdrew on 23 February 2010 to concussions suffered at the Whistler Sliding Centre. Harvey finished 22nd in the two-man event.

Prior to becoming a bobsledder, Harvey was ranked among the top five hurdlers in Australia from 2001 to 2007.
