= Gerhard Koehler =

Austrian bobsledder

Gerhard Koehler (born 7 November 1978) is an Austrian bobsledder who has competed since 2003. His best Bobsleigh World Cup finish was third in the two-man event at Cesana Pariol in February 2007.

Koehler's also finished 17th in the two-man event at the 2006 Winter Olympics in Turin.

His best finish at the FIBT World Championships was 13th in the four-man event at St. Moritz in 2007.
