= Pierre Lueders =

Canadian bobsledder (born 1970)

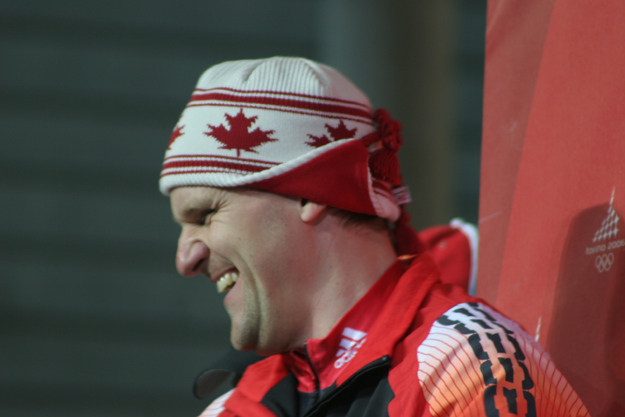
- Lueders at the 2006 Winter Olympics in Turin

Personal information
- Full name: Pierre Lueders
- Nationality: (Canada) Canadian
- Born: 26 September 1970 (age 55) Edmonton, Alberta, Canada
- Height: 1.84 m (6 ft 0 in)
- Weight: 101 kg (223 lb)

Sport
- Country: Canada
- Sport: Bobsleigh
- Retired: 2010

Achievements and titles
- Olympic finals: 1st place, gold medalist(s) 2nd place, silver medalist(s)
Medal record
Men's Bobsleigh
Representing Canada
Olympic Games
Gold medal – first place	1998 Nagano	Two-man
Silver medal – second place	2006 Turin	Two-man
World Championships
Gold medal – first place	2004 Königssee	Two-man
Gold medal – first place	2005 Calgary	Two-man
Silver medal – second place	1995 Winterberg	Two-man
Silver medal – second place	1996 Calgary	Two-man
Silver medal – second place	2003 Lake Placid	Two-man
Silver medal – second place	2007 St. Moritz	Four-man
Bronze medal – third place	1999 Cortina d'Ampezzo	Four-man
Bronze medal – third place	2005 Calgary	Four-man

Pierre Fritz Lueders (born 26 September 1970) is a Canadian Olympic, world and World Cup champion bobsledder who competed from 1990 to 2010. He piloted both two-man and four-man bobsleigh, retiring after the 2010 Winter Olympics. He was named to Canada's Sports Hall of Fame in 2012.

== Biography ==
Lueders grew up in Edmonton and went to Winterburn School for elementary and junior high. He attended Jasper Place High School for grades 10 through 12.

=== Competitive career ===
Originally a decathlete, in 1989 he switched to bobsleigh on the advice of a cousin who was a sportswriter in what was then East Germany, who suggested his build was better suited to the latter sport. Beginning as a brakeman and progressing rapidly, he became a pilot by 1991 and in 1992 won the first World Cup race he entered.

A five-time Olympian, Lueders is the most decorated slider in Canadian history. He was the pilot of the Canadian two-man bobsleigh (teamed with Dave MacEachern) that won the gold medal at the 1998 Winter Olympics (shared with the Italian duo of Günther Huber and Antonio Tartaglia). This was only Canada's second-ever medal in bobsleigh, and the first since Vic Emery led his four-man crew to victory in 1964. Lueders and MacEachern ended their partnership shortly after the 1998 Games, with MacEachern attempting to make the transition to competing as a pilot in his own right: Lueders subsequently teamed up with Ken Leblanc and Giulio Zardo. At the 2002 Winter Olympics in Salt Lake City, Lueders placed a disappointing fifth-place finish in two-man, and ninth in four-man, causing him to take the 2002–03 season off in four-man. At the 2006 Winter Olympics in Turin, in the two-man event, he and his brakeman Lascelles Brown won silver despite having to contend with heavy snowfall. In the four-man event, Pierre and his brakeman Ken Kotyk, Morgan Alexander, and Lascelles Brown placed 4th.

Lueders also won eight medals at the FIBT World Championships with two golds (Two-man: 2004, 2005), four silvers (Two-man: 1995, 1996, 2003; Four-man: 2007), and two bronzes (Four-man: 1999, 2005).

In the Bobsleigh World Cup, Lueders won the combined men's event four times (1993-4, 1994–5, 1997–8, 2005-6), the two-man event a record six times (1993-4, 1994–5, 1996–7, 1997–8, 2002–3, 2005-6), and the four-man event once (1994-5). Pierre Lueders has won 88 career medals in the Bobsleigh World Cup.

Lueders and his brakeman Justin Kripps made the first run down the Whistler Sliding Centre, a facility built for the 2010 Winter Olympics, on 19 December 2007. Turn 7 at the Sliding Centre, "Lueders Loop", is named in his honor after he crashed out his sled during the track's homologation in March 2008, his first crash since the 2001 Goodwill Games.

In 2010, he finished 5th in the two-man bobsleigh race. He finish 5th in the four-man bobsleigh.

=== Coaching career ===
Lueders retired after the Vancouver Games and was named as a national bobsleigh team development coach. He left the job in May 2012, saying he wanted a break from the sport after 22 years as an athlete and coach.

However just over a week later Lueders was appointed head coach of the Russian national bobsleigh team that would go on to win two gold medals at the 2014 Sochi Winter Olympics. He left his position as Russia coach in June 2016.

In October 2017 he became caretaker head coach for the Republic of Korea's bobsleigh team ahead of their campaign on home ice at the 2018 Winter Olympics in Pyeongchang. In the four-man bobsleigh event, the Koreans consisting of Won Yun-jong (pilot), Seo Young-woo, Jun Jung-lin and Kim Dong-hyun tied with one of the German teams for the silver medal, the first Olympic medal won by an Asian bobsleigh team.

=== Personal life ===
As of 1997, Lueders resides in Calgary, Alberta. Outside of bobsledding, Lueders joined Sotheby's International Realty as an associate in Calgary in January 2017.

== Results ==
=== World Cup Championships ===
Rank	Season	Event
1st place, gold medalist(s)	1993–94	Two-man
1st place, gold medalist(s)	1993–94	Combined
1st place, gold medalist(s)	1994–95	Two-man
1st place, gold medalist(s)	1994–95	Four-man
1st place, gold medalist(s)	1994–95	Combined
1st place, gold medalist(s)	1996–97	Two-man
1st place, gold medalist(s)	1997–98	Combined
1st place, gold medalist(s)	1997–98	Two-man
1st place, gold medalist(s)	2002–03	Two-man
1st place, gold medalist(s)	2005–06	Combined
1st place, gold medalist(s)	2005–06	Two-man
2nd place, silver medalist(s)	1995–96	Combined
2nd place, silver medalist(s)	1995–96	Two-man
2nd place, silver medalist(s)	2001–02	Two-man
2nd place, silver medalist(s)	2003–04	Combined
2nd place, silver medalist(s)	2003–04	Two-man
2nd place, silver medalist(s)	2004–05	Two-man
2nd place, silver medalist(s)	2006–07	Two-man
2nd place, silver medalist(s)	2005-06	Four-man
2nd place, silver medalist(s)	2006–07	Combined
3rd place, bronze medalist(s)	1996–97	Combined
3rd place, bronze medalist(s)	1998–99	Combined
3rd place, bronze medalist(s)	1998–99	Two-man
3rd place, bronze medalist(s)	1999–00	Combined
3rd place, bronze medalist(s)	1999–00	Four-man
3rd place, bronze medalist(s)	2004–05	Combined
3rd place, bronze medalist(s)	2004–05	Four-man
