= Reinis Rozītis =

Latvian bobsledder

Reinis Rozitis (born 1 September 1982) is a Latvian bobsledder who has competed since 2003. He is a brakeman. His best Bobsleigh World Cup finish was second in the four-man event at Lake Placid in December 2006.

Rozītis also finished 21st in the four-man event at the 2006 Winter Olympics in Turin.

His best finish at the FIBT World Championships was seventh in the four-man event at St. Moritz in 2007.
