= Janine Tischer =

German bobsledder (born 1984)

Personal information
- Born: 19 May 1984 (age 42) Meiningen, East Germany
Medal record
Women's bobsleigh
Representing Germany
World Championships
| Silver medal – second place | 2007 St. Moritz | Two-woman |
| Silver medal – second place | 2008 Altenberg | Two-woman |
| Bronze medal – third place | 2009 Lake Placid | Two-woman |
European Championships
| Gold medal – first place | 2005 Altenberg | Two-woman |
| Gold medal – first place | 2012 Altenberg | Two-woman |
| Silver medal – second place | 2007 Cortina d'Ampezzo | Two-woman |
| Silver medal – second place | 2008 Cesana | Two-woman |
| Silver medal – second place | 2009 St. Moritz | Two-woman |

Janine Tischer (born 19 May 1984 in Meiningen) is a German bobsledder who has competed since 2002. She won three medals in the two-woman event at the FIBT World Championships with two silvers (2007, 2008) and a bronze (2009).

Tischer finished seventh in the two-woman event at the 2010 Winter Olympics in Vancouver.
