= Chris le Bihan =

Canadian bobsledder

Personal information
- Nationality: Canadian
- Born: May 27, 1977 (age 49) Grande Prairie, Alberta
Medal record
Bobsleigh
Representing Canada
Olympic Games
Bronze medal – third place	2010 Vancouver	Four-man

Chris le Bihan (born May 27, 1977 in Grande Prairie, Alberta) is a Canadian bobsledder who has competed since 2004. He won a bronze medal in the four-man event at the 2010 Winter Olympics in Vancouver. Bihan's best finish at the FIBT World Championships was fourth in the mixed team event at Lake Placid, New York, in 2009.

He won the World Cup four-man event at Park City, Utah, on 14 November 2009.
