= Sabina Hafner =

Swiss bobsledder (born 1984)

Medal record

Bobsleigh

Representing Switzerland

World Championships
Silver medal – second place	2009 Lake Placid	Mixed team
Bronze medal – third place	2007 St. Moritz	Mixed team

European Championships
Silver medal – second place	2010 Innsbruck-Igls	Two-woman

Sabina Hafner (sometimes misspelled Sabrina Hafner, born 10 May 1984) is a Swiss bobsledder who competed from 2003 to 2012. She won two medals in the mixed bobsleigh-skeleton team event at the FIBT World Championships with a silver in 2009 and a bronze in 2007.

She won the World Junior Championship three times (2007, 2009, 2010) and the Swiss Championships six times (2005, 2006, 2009, 2010, 2011, 2016).

Her biggest success is the second place at the European Championship in Igls (AUT) in 2010.

Hafner also competed in two Winter Olympics, earning her best finish of tenth in the two-woman event at Turin in 2006.
