= Max Rüegg =

Swiss bobsledder

Medal record

Bobsleigh

World Championships
Gold medal – first place	1982 St. Moritz	Two-man
Silver medal – second place	1983 Lake Placid	Two-man
Bronze medal – third place	1981 Cortina d'Ampezzo	Four-man
Bronze medal – third place	1982 St. Moritz	Four-man

Max Rüegg is a Swiss bobsledder who competed in the early 1980s. He won four medals at the FIBT World Championships with a gold (Two-man: 1982, a silver (Two-man: 1983) and two bronzes (Four-man: 1981, 1982).

He is the brother of Tony Rüegg and the uncle of Reto Rüegg, Ivo Rüegg and Ralph Rüegg, all of whom have also competed in bobsleigh.
