= Romy Logsch =

German bobsledder (born 1982)

Medal record

Women's bobsleigh

Representing Germany

World Championships
Gold medal – first place	2007 St. Moritz	Two-woman
Gold medal – first place	2008 Altenberg	Two-woman
Gold medal – first place	2011 Königssee	Two-woman

European Championships
Gold medal – first place	2007 Cortina d'Ampezzo	Two-woman
Gold medal – first place	2010 Innsbruck-Igls	Two-woman

Romy Logsch (born 5 February 1982 in Leipzig) is a former German bobsledder who had competed between 2006 and 2012.

== Career ==
She won two gold medals in the two-woman event at the FIBT World Championships, earning them in 2007 and 2008. At the 2010 Winter Olympics in Vancouver, Logsch was disqualified when she was ejected from her sled after it had crashed out in the final run of the two-woman event.
