= Tony Rüegg =

Swiss bobsledder

Medal record

Bobsleigh

World Championships
Bronze medal – third place	1981 Cortina d'Ampezzo	Four-man
Bronze medal – third place	1982 St. Moritz	Four-man

Tony Rüegg is a Swiss bobsledder who competed in the early 1980s. He won two bronze medals in the four-man event at the FIBT World Championships, earning them in 1981 and 1982.

He is the brother of Max Ruegg, the father of Ralph Rüegg, and the uncle of Reto and Ivo Rüegg, all of whom have competed in bobsleigh.
