= Ryuichi Kobayashi =

Japanese bobsledder (born 1976)

Ryuichi Kobayashi (小林 竜一, Kobayashi Ryūichi, born November 23, 1976) is a Japanese bobsledder who has competed since 2004. Competing in two Winter Olympics, he earned his best finish of 21st in both the two-man and four-man events at Vancouver in 2010.

Kobayashi's best finish at the FIBT World Championships was 19th in the four-man event at Lake Placid, New York, in 2009. His best World Cup finish was 21st in a four-man event at St. Moritz in January 2010.
