= Karl Angerer =

German bobsledder (born 1979)

Personal information
- Born: 18 July 1979 (age 46) Berchtesgaden, Bavaria, West Germany
- Height: 1.86 m (6 ft 1 in)
- Weight: 99 kg (218 lb; 15.6 st)
- Website: Bobteam Angerer (in German)

Sport
- Country: Germany
- Sport: Bobsleigh (pilot)
- Turned pro: 2003

Achievements and titles
- Olympic finals: 7th, 9th
Medal record
Men´s Bobsleigh
Representing Germany
World Championships
Gold medal – first place	2007 St. Moritz	Mixed team
Silver medal – second place	2011 Königssee	Four-man
Silver medal – second place	2011 Königssee	Mixed team
World Cup Championships
Bronze medal – third place	2009–10	Two-man

Karl Angerer (born 18 July 1979 in Berchtesgaden) is a former German bobsledder who had competed between 1999 and 2012. He won a gold medal in the mixed bobsleigh-skeleton team event at the 2007 FIBT World Championships in St. Moritz.

At the 2010 Winter Olympics, he finished seventh in the four-man and ninth in the two-man events.
