= Valerie Fleming =

American bobsledder

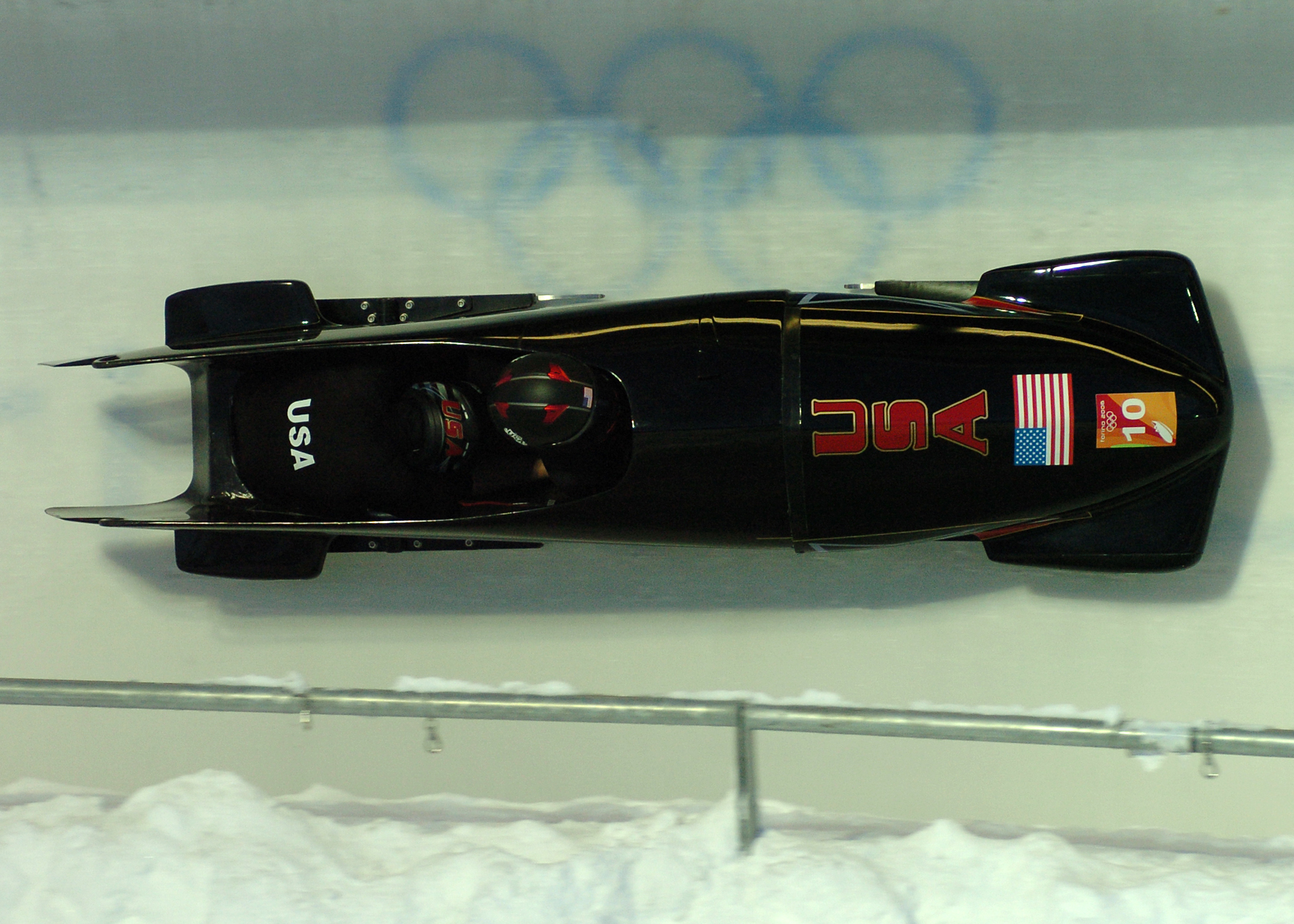
- Fleming (in back) and Rohbock during their medal-winning run in Turin

Personal information
- Born: December 18, 1976 (age 49) San Francisco, California, U.S.
Medal record
Bobsleigh
Representing United States
Olympic Games
Silver medal – second place	2006 Turin	Two-woman
World Championships
Silver medal – second place	2011 Königssee	Two-woman
Bronze medal – third place	2005 Calgary	Two-woman
Bronze medal – third place	2007 St. Moritz	Two-woman
Bronze medal – third place	2009 Lake Placid	Mixed team

Valerie Fleming (born December 18, 1976) is an American former bobsledder who has competed since 2003. At the 2006 Winter Olympics in Turin, she won a silver in the two-woman event with teammate and future wife Shauna Rohbock.

Fleming also won three bronze medals at the FIBT World Championships (Two-woman: 2005, 2007; Mixed team: 2009).

Born in San Francisco, Fleming lives in Park City, Utah.

== Career highlights ==
Olympic Winter Games
2006 – Turin, (silver) 2nd with Shauna Rohbock
World Championships
2005 – Calgary, (bronze) 3rd with Shauna Rohbock
2007 – St. Moritz, (bronze) 3rd with Shauna Rohbock
World Cup
2004 – Igls, (bronze) 3rd with Shauna Rohbock
2005 – Cesana, (silver) 2nd with Shauna Rohbock
2005 – Calgary, (silver) 2nd with Shauna Rohbock
2005 – Lake Placid, (bronze) 3rd with Shauna Rohbock
2005 – Igls, (bronze) 3rd with Shauna Rohbock
2005 – Cortina d'Ampezzo, (bronze) 3rd with Shauna Rohbock
2006 – Calgary, (gold) 1st with Shauna Rohbock
2006 – Park City, (gold) 1st with Shauna Rohbock
2006 – Lake Placid, (bronze) 3rd with Shauna Rohbock
2007 – Igls, (silver) 2nd with Shauna Rohbock
2007 – Cesana, (silver) 2nd with Shauna Rohbock
2007 – Winterberg, (silver) 2nd with Shauna Rohbock
2007 – Königssee, (silver) 2nd with Shauna Rohbock
2007 – Park City, (bronze) 3rd with Shauna Rohbock
2008 – Cesana, (silver) 2nd with Shauna Rohbock
