= Matthias Höpfner =

German bobsledder (born 1975)

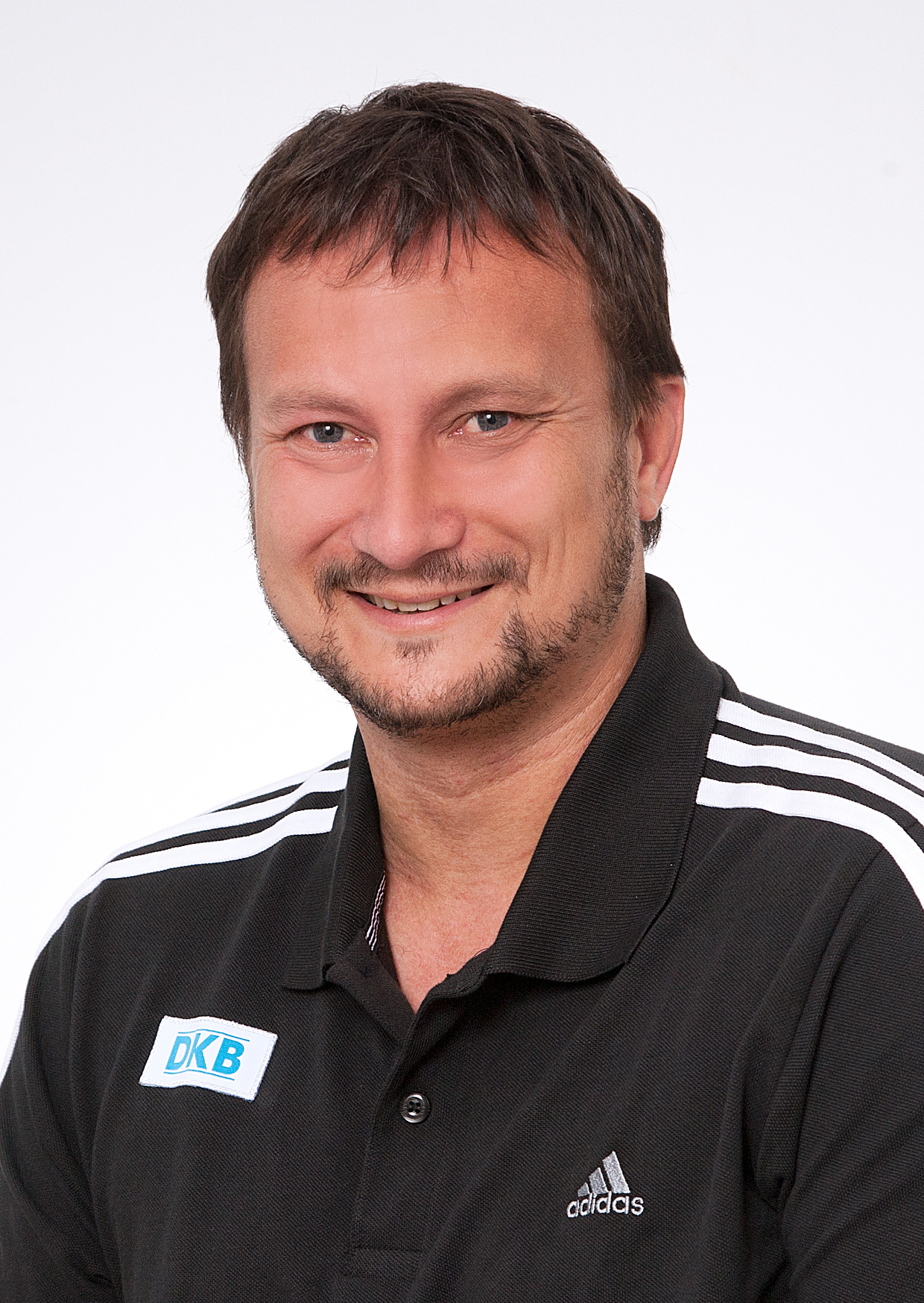
- Matthias Höpfner (2012)

Medal record

Men's Bobsleigh

Representing Germany

World Championships
Gold medal – first place	2008 Altenberg	Mixed team
Bronze medal – third place	2008 Altenberg	Four-man

Matthias Höpfner (born 30 December 1975 in Erfurt) is a German bobsledder who has competed since 1995. He won two medals at the 2008 FIBT World Championships in Altenberg, Germany with a gold in the mixed bobsleigh-skeleton team event and a bronze in the four-man event.

Höpfner also finished fifth in the two-man event at the 2006 Winter Olympics in Turin.
