= Kicker Vencill =

American swimmer

Personal information
- Born: Kicker Eugene Vencill; June 23, 1978 (age 48) Richmond, Kentucky, United States

Sport
- Sport: Swimming
- Club: Trojan Aquatics Swim Club

Kicker Eugene Vencill (born June 23, 1978) is an American swimmer, who won a lawsuit against a dietary supplement company for having contaminated multivitamins which caused him to be suspended from swimming for two years from 2003, even though they were prescribed to him by his doctor. The court awarded him over US$500,000.

He started swimming aged four in Richmond, Kentucky. He went on to swim for Model Laboratory School in high school and Western Kentucky in college. He represented United States at the 2001 Summer Universiade.
