= Brock Kreitzburg =

American bobsledder (born 1976)

Personal information
- Nationality: American
- Born: February 22, 1976 (age 50) Akron, Ohio
- Education: University of Toledo
- Height: 6 ft 1 in (185 cm)
- Weight: 209 lb (95 kg)
- Website: Official website

Sport
- Position: Push Athlete
- Team: USA Bobsled (2002–2010)
Medal record
Bobsleigh
World Cup
Gold medal – first place	2007–08 World Cup	USA 1 Four Man
Gold medal – first place	2007–08 World Cup	USA 1 Four Man
Silver medal – second place	2007–08 World Cup	USA 1 Four Man
Silver medal – second place	2007–08 World Cup	USA 1 Four Man
Gold medal – first place	2006–07 World Cup	USA 1 Four Man
Gold medal – first place	2006–07 World Cup	USA 1 Four Man
Silver medal – second place	2005–06 World Cup	USA 1 Four Man
Gold medal – first place	2006–07 World Cup; Overall Season	USA 1 Two Man
Silver medal – second place	2006–07 World Cup; Overall Season	USA 1 Four Man
Silver medal – second place	2006–07 World Cup	USA 1 Four Man
Gold medal – first place	2006–07 World Cup	USA 1 Two Man
Silver medal – second place	2006–07 World Cup	USA 1 Two Man
Silver medal – second place	2006–07 World Cup	USA 1 Two Man
Gold medal – first place	2005–06 World Cup	USA 1 Four Man
Silver medal – second place	2005–06 World Cup	USA 1 Four Man

Brock Kreitzburg (born February 16, 1976) was an American bobsledder who competed from 2001 to 2008.

== Early life ==
A graduate from the University of Toledo and a native of Akron, Ohio, Kreitzburg was in the US Bobsled program from 2001 to 2008.

In 2003, Kreitzburg graduated from Gordon-Conwell Theological Seminary. He became a Christian after his father had died from cancer 20 years earlier which caused "an emptiness" that he tried to fill "with so many different things in high school and even the beginning of college." It left Kreitzburg a void he "...was trying to fill...".

== Career ==
Kreitzburg when was selected to the 2006 US Olympic Team he was able to dispel the disappointment of being dropped from his ride at the 2005 World Championship by his then partner Steve Holcomb of the USA 2 bobsled.The 2005–06 season saw Brock become one of the most constituent pushers on the World Cup scene.

With success at hand, USA 1 bobsled driver Todd Hays invited Kreitzburg's to join his team and he then graduated from the #2 team to the #1 team for the lead up to, and during, the Torino Games.

At the 2006 Games, he appeared in the Cleveland Plain Dealer & Cleveland.com as an athlete correspondent and was a frequent on-air personality on NBC with multiple appearances on the Today Show and appeared on The Tonight Show in a bit with 3 teammates and Tom Green. Kreitzburg was a member of the Home Depot Olympic Job Opportunity Program and worked with Home Depot since 2002 until they ended the program & their sponsorship of the US Olympic Team in March 2009. Following the Games, Kreitzburg was an occasional host of local programming for the NBC affiliate in Cleveland.

The 2006–07 season, saw a changing of the guard with USA 1 and the sled was now driven by former USA 2 teammate Steve Holcomb. The season gave Kreitzburg as Holcomb's pushman the greatest success collectively they had ever seen and the 2 of them won the World Cup 2-man championship. Additionally, the 4-man team that Brock was a member of finished 2nd overall. The 2 & 4 man teams collected eight medals during the season.

The 2007–08 season saw Kreitzburg focus much of his time towards being a member of the 4-man team and he was able to pick up another 2 Gold and 2 Silvers during the season.

During the 2007–08 off season, Kreitzburg participated in the NASCAR Nationwide Series as a member of Stanton Barrett's pit crew.

Kreitzburg took the 2008–09 season off to have surgery. Kreitzburg was able to resume his career after these surgeries and was named a member of the 2009–10 US National Bobsled Team.

Kreitzburg did not qualify for the US team for the 2010 Winter Olympics in wake of his two hip surgeries in the 17 months leading up to the 2010 Games.

== World championship biography ==
Competed for the United States in Six World Championships

USA 1: 2005–06, 2006–07, 2007–08

USA 2: 2003–04, 2004–05

USA 3: 2002–03

== Collegiate biography ==
Kreitzburg graduated from the University of Toledo. He competed in track and field in the decathlon and football as a wide receiver. Kreitzburg earned a Master of Divinity degree from the Gordon-Conwell Theological Seminary in 2003.

== Accomplishments and notes ==
2008–09 Did not compete due to injury

2007–08 Participated in the NASCAR Nationwide Series as a member of Stanton Barrett's pit crew

2006–07 Overall Two Man Team World Cup Champion (driver Steve Holcomb)

2006–07 Overall Four Man Team World Cup Runner-Up (driver Steve Holcomb)

2006 Finished Seventh Overall with USA 1 (driver Todd Hays) Four Man Team at the 2006 Winter Olympics in Turin

2006 Named to the US Olympic Team – USA 1 Bobsled

Jan 1, 2006 Appeared in the Tournament of Roses Parade, Pasadena, CA

2001 Became a member of the USA Bobsled Team

1999 Attended mini-camp for the Tampa Bay Buccaneers

1998–99 All-Conference Wide Receiver at the University of Toledo

== Media appearances ==
February 2009 Quoted nationally in USA Today, Wall Street Journal & the AP regarding Home Depot's elimination of the Olympic Job Opportunity Program that benefitted the rank and file US Olympic athletes ability to live, work and train for their sport via Home Depot's US Olympic Committee sponsorship

Summer 2006 WKYC Cleveland Morning Show – Guest Host (multiple occasions)

February 20, 2006 NBC Tonight Show with Jay Leno (Skit with Tom Green)

February 13, 2006 Home Depot Satellite Media Tour – Televised throughout the United States

February 2006 Appeared on the Today Show as an Athlete Correspondent

February 2006 Athlete Correspondent for the Cleveland Plain Dealer & Cleveland.com

== Education ==
2021 University of Illinois, Masters of Business Administration (MBA)

2003 Gordon-Conwell Theological Seminary, Masters of Divinity (M.Div.)

1998 University of Toledo, B.A. Elementary Education

== Home Depot biography ==
As a member of the US Olympic Team's Olympic Job Opportunity Program, Kreitzburg amongst hundreds of other OJOP athletes was able to work at a variety of Home Depot locations throughout the United States and while still doing all of what was needed to train for the World Cups, World Championships and ultimately the Winter Olympics. Through this program that Home Depot had been committed to from 1992, the program netted over 100 Olympic Medals to the United States and hundreds more in World Cup and World Championships for both Summer and Winter sports.

Brock worked in the Paint Department.

Additionally, Kreitzburg took part in events where the Home Depot would ask OJOP participants to represent themselves and the company. This included the 2006 Tournament of Roses Parade on the Home Depot float.

This is an incomplete list, but these are some of the stores that Kreitzburg was able to work at while a member of the Home Depot program:

The Home Depot in Wadsworth, Ohio The Home Depot in Colorado Springs, Colorado
