= Danilo Santarsiero =

Italian bobsledder (born 1979)

Danilo Santarsiero (born March 30, 1979) is an Italian bobsledder who has competed since 2004. His best Bobsleigh World Cup finish was third in the two-man event at Lake Placid in December 2006.

Santarsiero's best finish at the FIBT World Championships was 14th in the four-man event at Altenberg in 2008.

He finished tied for ninth in the four-man event at the 2010 Winter Olympics in Vancouver.
