= Ivo Danilevič =

Czech bobsledder (born 1970)

Ivo Danilevič (born 10 April 1970 in Jablonec nad Nisou) is a Czech bobsledder who has competed since 1996. Competing in three Winter Olympics, he earned his best finish of 12th in the four-man event at Vancouver in 2010.

Danilevič also earned his best finish ninth in the two-man event at the 2007 FIBT World Championships in St. Moritz.
