= Samuele Romanini =

Italian bobsledder (born 1976)

Personal information
- Born: 22 September 1976 (age 49)
Medal record
Men's Bobsleigh
Representing Italy
World Championships
Bronze medal – third place	2007 St. Moritz	Two-man

Samuele Romanini (born 22 September 1976) is an Italian bobsledder who has competed since 2001. He won a bronze medal in the two-man event at the 2007 FIBT World Championships in St. Moritz.

Romanini also competed in two Winter Olympics, earning his best finish of tied for ninth in the four-man event in Vancouver in 2010.
