= Ainārs Podnieks =

Latvian bobsledder

Ainārs Podnieks (born October 13, 1980) is a Latvian bobsledder who competed from 2003 to 2009. World junior champion in four man 2004 His best Bobsleigh World Cup finish was second in the four-man event at Lake Placid in December 2006.

Podnieks also finished seventh in the four-man event at the 2007 FIBT World Championships in St. Moritz.
