= Lascelles Brown =

Jamaican-born Canadian bobsledder

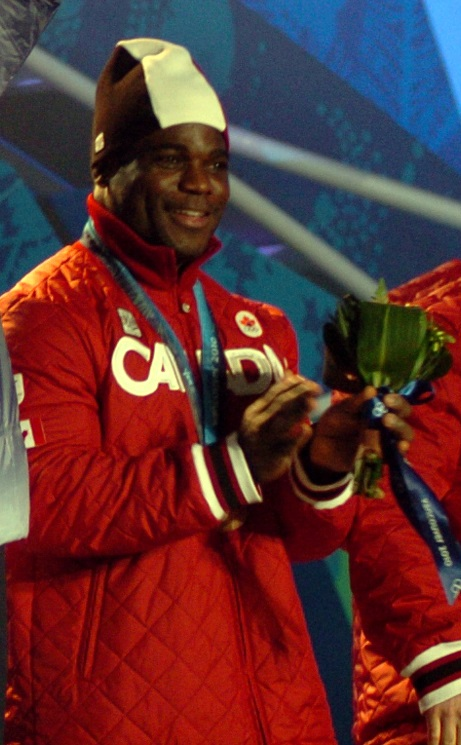
- Brown at the 2010 Winter Olympics

Personal information
- Born: October 12, 1974 (age 52) May Pen, Clarendon, Jamaica
Medal record
Men's Bobsleigh
Representing Canada
Olympic Games
Silver medal – second place	2006 Turin	Two-man
Bronze medal – third place	2010 Vancouver	Four-man
World Championships
Gold medal – first place	2005 Calgary	Two-man
Silver medal – second place	2007 St. Moritz	Four-man
Bronze medal – third place	2005 Calgary	Four-man

Lascelles Brown (born October 12, 1974 in May Pen) is a Jamaican-born Canadian bobsledder who has competed for three countries since starting his career in 1999. Competing in three Winter Olympics, he is the first Jamaican-born athlete to win a Winter Olympic medal.

Brown was a member of the Jamaica national bobsled team from 1999 to 2004, competing at the 2002 Winter Olympics in Salt Lake City, as a brakeman for Winston Watt. The Jamaican duo set the track push record during those games. He continued training for bobsleigh at Calgary's Canada Olympic Park, where he met and married his wife Kara, a Canadian. As of 2011, they have three daughters and a son together.

He applied for Canadian citizenship on July 28, 2005; it was awarded to him by special exemption just prior to the 2006 Winter Olympics, enabling him to compete for Canada at the games in Turin. Brown acted as the brakeman for Lyndon Rush in both the 2-man and 4-man event. Brown competed at the 2010 Winter Olympics together with Rush on their home track at the Whistler Sliding Centre, winning bronze in the four-man event. Brown had previously been competing with North America's most decorated bobsleigh pilot Pierre Lueders but the two had a falling-out and no longer compete together. Brown recently said that "I'd only do it if Jesus asked" when questioned if he would ever compete with Lueders again.

Bobsleigh Canada coach Gerd Grimme described Brown as one of the top three brakesmen in the world, along with Beat Hefti of Switzerland and Germany's Kevin Kuske.

Beginning the 2010 season Brown became a competitor for Monaco, and was partnered with Monégasque Patrice Servelle. He stopped representing Monaco, returning as a competitor for Canada in 2012.

== Results ==
In the 2004–2005 season, Pierre Lueders and Brown won a world title, five World Cup medal finishes in two-man and three medal finishes in four-man.

In the 2006 Olympic Games, Lueders and Brown won a silver medal in the two-man event. Brown also has a complete set of medals at the FIBT World Championships with gold in the two-man event (2005), a silver in the four-man event (2007) and a bronze in the four-man event (2005).

In the 2010 Olympic Winter Games held in Vancouver, BC Lascelles Brown won the bronze medal along with his teammates Lyndon Rush, Chris Le Bihan and David Bissett.
