= Pavle Jovanovic (bobsledder) =

American bobsledder (1977–2020)

Medal record

Bobsleigh

World Championships
Bronze medal – third place	2004 Königssee	Four-man

Pavle Jovanovic (January 11, 1977 – May 3, 2020) was an American bobsledder of Serbian origin who had competed since 1997. At the 2006 Winter Olympics in Turin, he finished seventh both in the two-man event and in the four-man event. Although on the U.S. Bobsled team in 2002, he was disqualified from competing due to the presence of prohibited substances from food supplements, which he claimed were taken without his knowledge or intent.

Jovanovic won a bronze medal in the four-man event at the 2004 FIBT World Championships in Königssee.

In 2011, Jovanovic started to compete for Serbia.

He was one of the best pushers in bobsledding, a position requiring extraordinary strength.

== Career ==
Jovanovic was born and raised in Toms River, New Jersey and graduated from Toms River High School East. At the age of 20, he began to race Bobsleds competitively, and proved adept at the art of being the brakeman. A brakeman is a pusher, sitting at the rear of a four-man or two-man sled. "The brakeman is crucial in getting the sled started, and stopping the sled after the run. His competitive weight was 100 kilograms (220 lb), and he stood 1.85 meters (6 ft 2 in) tall. His size and performance made him "an ideal brakeman", something he did not start out to do. "I did it because I loved it ... [and] I was naturally good at power lifting and running."

Jovanovic talks about pushing off at the top of the course. "When it comes to loading into the sled, I think that that is something that only years and years of experience in high competitions, with crowds and years of training properly at high speeds, can really give you crisp, smooth look," he explained. Repeated off season training is the ticket. Where mere thousandths of a second can separate winners, precise teamwork is an absolute necessity. Obtaining "the smoothest acceleration" is the goal; entry should be automatic, "crisp and clean". (Note: "And from that point on, you are just trying to stay as smooth and as long and as bio-mechanically correct as you can from what your coaches have taught you all along." – Pavle Javanovic.)

According to Voice of America, Jovanovic was described by U.S. Olympic team officials as "one of the most feared brakemen on the Bobsleigh World Cup circuit". These officials noted Jovanovic's two first-place finishes in 2004 and "strong performances" in 2005 as reasons for considering him "one of the best".

Jovanovic was seen as a likely medalist at the 2006 Olympics. His extensive experience and training helped earn him two golds and a silver medal at the 2005 Bobsleigh World Cup. In the two-man with Todd Hays, Jovanovic won a silver and a bronze medal in 2006, but 2006 4-man medal gold was not to be. U.S. sled driver Todd Hays expressed regret that he could not bring home a medal for his team—Pavle Jovanovic, Steve Mesler and Brock Kreitzburg. He blamed himself for bad driving. Todd Hays said he had both the right equipment and "I have the push. I just didn't drive well again tonight. For some reason, I can't find a rhythm on this track," despite finding the 'rhythm' of all the other tracks in the world.

HBO's Bryant Gumbel interviewed Jovanovic extensively about the suspension during Real Sports with Bryant Gumbel Season 8.

== Doping suspension ==
Before testing positive, Jovanovic likely would have been the pusher for driver Todd Hays' sleigh—which won the silver medal in four-man in the 2002 Olympics. Instead, he watched the event on television. The American bobsled team had its sights on ending the 46-year "American medal drought". Jovanovic was integral to the effort, however his nine-month suspension for testing positive for a banned steroid prevented him from contributing.

Jovanovic was set to become a member of the United States bobsleigh in time for the 2002 Winter Olympics in Salt Lake City. However, he failed a drug test on December 29, 2001, for ingesting Nitro Tech, a nutritional supplement he purchased at a General Nutrition Centers store in Salt Lake City eight days earlier that contained norandrostenedione, a derivative of androstenedione, a substance famously and controversially used by former Major League Baseball sluggers, e.g. Mark McGwire, and thereafter banned by the International Olympic Committee and the World Anti-Doping Agency. Supported by his teammates, Jovanovic admitted he took the supplement, but said it had been recommended by a nutritionist, and that he unintentionally ingested the steroid, which was unlisted in the supplement's ingredients. In December 2001, Jovanovic had recommended the products to Curt Clausen, a two-time U.S. Olympic racewalker, who had chronic muscle fatigue from his 100-mile-a-week workouts. Jovanovic recommended a number of carbohydrate and protein supplements, which were claimed to be free of banned substances. However, Clausen discovered through online research that they were marketed mainly to bodybuilders, so he declined the supplements. The next month Jovanovic tested positive for metabolites of the banned steroid nandrolone, 19-norandrosterone and 19-noretiocholanolone.

The International Olympic Committee imposed a two-year ban against Jovanovic. U.S. Anti-Doping Agency (USADA) chief Terry Madden, whose group oversees the domestic testing of Olympic athletes stated:

[Our] message has never wavered. ... You cannot take supplements without assuming the risks. A number of positive tests have been blamed on contaminated supplements, and athletes have been warned for years about the dangers and health risks associated with taking dietary supplements. This is not an athlete health issue. I believe it is a health issue for the American public.

Jovanovic was put on two-year suspension as a result. Jovanovic maintained it was an accidental ingestion. In 2002, his teammates broke the 46-year medal drought. Jovanovic said the experience left some bitterness, including "I had some disdain for the sport. After I watched the (U.S.) team race in the Olympics, [but] I had to determine if I was going to make it back."

After his suspension from bobsledding, Jovanovic worked in Toms River for his father's construction business. He received a bachelor's degree in fluid mechanics from Rutgers University.

Jovanovic returned to bobsleigh in 2003 and was drug-free as of 2006.

== Perspective ==
The suspension of Jovanovic for the use of nutritional supplements—which he swore he did not know to be steroid adulterated—became a cause célèbre. Essentially, he became the poster child for the cause.

In an interview, team captain Todd Hays pulled items out of a bag and showcased them, referring to them as "illegal drugs" and as would "a lawyer setting up Exhibit A for the jury." Noting that the sports supplements and drinks were available for free in the Olympic Village, (Note: These things are all free of charge, available on every corner of the Village," he said. "And I find that to be quite ironic that these people (from the IOC and USADA) will stand on this soap box and preach about the integrity of the athletes when you give them a few dollars and they'll put these bars out.") he questioned their purity. When a reporter asked about the two-year ban Jovanovic was given one day before Opening Ceremonies, he "pulled no punches. He 'ripped' supplement makers, the International Olympic Committee, and the United States Anti-Doping Agency." He said that "They're very educated about what these companies are putting in these protein drinks and powders. The problem is that the athletes are not educated on this. Apparently, they have tested several hundred supplements and found that 25 percent of them contain banned supplements. The only problem is that they won't release the names of these companies." Hays concluded: "As you can see, it's affected me a tad." Being branded a cheater does great harm to athletes.

Jovanovic sued the supplement companies. In doing so, he joined a list of athletes—at least five—who sued supplement manufacturers. "When athletes flunk strict drug tests, it can cost them plenty—missed competitions, lost salary, endorsement deals." Some athletes have sued for damages, alleging damage to their reputation and lost opportunities. Contaminated and tainted supplements "can lead to arrest and criminal prosecution; in others, the bad press alone can have a devastating effect upon consumer confidence and a company’s bottom line—sometimes even before the alleged contamination is confirmed.... If the contamination involves a substance banned in competitive sports, a lawsuit may be filed..." The suits allege that the tainted powders, pills and liquids "caused them to fail tests designed to spot cheaters." He filed a lawsuit against Century Foods International in Wisconsin over his 2001 failed drug test in October 2005. The manufacturer and other defendants denied liability, and said there was no impurity in their product. This lawsuit was dismissed by agreement on April 12, 2006, in Salt Lake City.

Such contamination has been a common problem. (Note: An Olympic accredited testing lab in 2002 found 94 of 634 supplement samples were tainted. Substances not listed on the label were present and would trigger positive drug tests. Likewise, a 2007 report said "about 25% of supplement samples contained low levels of steroid and/or stimulant contamination". So U.S. bobsledder Pavle Jovanovic and NFL running back Mike Cloud blamed doping positives on tainted protein powders. World-class swimmer Kicker Vencill and Hans Knauss (Austrian skier) successfully "sued supplement manufacturers for their flunked doping tests.") Bad labeling, lying, intentional (Note: For example, Clenbuterol (an unapproved drug) was in a supplement product. This energy and fat loss supplement was found to contain undeclared sibutramine, a controlled substance appetite suppressant. The FDA issued a public warning that unsuspecting consumers could be injured due to increased blood pressure and heart rate, a risk for those with heart problems. The FDA wrote on its website there were "only 'trace amounts' were found but FDA lab tests showed that the product contained 'a significant amount of sibutramine per dosage unit'".) or accidental cross-contamination, and poor manufacture are all potentially implicated. (Note: Travis Tygart, a US Anti-Doping Agency lawyer, noted that a facility's poor cleaning of machines used to package several supplement types could result in cross-contamination.) When supplement companies are sued, they typically deny wrongdoing and counter that the players are blame shifting to hide their own guilt. They may even counter sue and allege defamation and trade libel.

== Death ==
On May 9, 2020, the United States bobsled and skeleton team announced that Jovanovic had died by suicide on May 3.

Mesler said that Jovanovic was his "personal legend", and "the athlete that set the standard for focus, dedication, meticulousness, and drive" in his life and for the team. "Pavle was king. He WAS the standard."
