= Jānis Miņins =

Latvian bobsledder

Personal information
- Born: 15 August 1980 (age 45) Kuldīga, Latvia
Medal record
Men's bobsleigh
Representing Latvia
World Championships
Bronze medal – third place	2009 Lake Placid	Four-man
World Cup Championships
Silver medal – second place	2008–09	Four-man
Silver medal – second place	2009–10	Four-man
European Championships
Gold medal – first place	2008 Cesana	Four-man

Jānis Miņins (born 15 August 1980 in Kuldīga) is a Latvian bobsledder who has competed since 1999. He won a bronze medal in the four-man event at the FIBT World Championships 2009 in Lake Placid, New York, earning the country its first championship medal ever.

In the 2004–05 season his best placing was a sixth place in the 4-man bob in Cortina d'Ampezzo and Winterberg, both times with Juris Latiss, Ainārs Podnieks and Jānis Ozols. For the 2005–06 season he changed his team mates, retaining Ozols but bringing in Mārcis Rullis and Intars Dīcmanis to the four-man bob. However, his team fell to a best place of 10th, and he has had his best placing in the World Cup this season at the World Cup in Igls, with a fourth place together with Daumants Dreiškens. He placed first at the Latvian selection event for the Olympic Games in Sigulda, and has been selected to compete at the 2006 Winter Olympics where he finished sixth in the two-man event and tenth in the four-man event.

Miņins missed the 2010 Winter Olympics, because of an appendix surgery he went through, when he had already arrived in Canada just days before the Olympic start. This prevented him from competing in the two-man event, but attempted to return to the four-man event before finally withdrawing to pain still experienced following his surgery and injuries to other crew members.

He has also won 2008 FIBT European Championship in four-man event at Cesana.

Miņins' best Bobsleigh World Cup championship finishes were second place in the four-man events in 2008-09 and 2009-10.

Awards
Preceded by Māris Štrombergs	Latvian Men's Sportspersonality of the Year; 2009	Succeeded by Martins Dukurs
