= Ivo Rüegg =

Swiss bobsledder (born 1971)

Personal information
- Born: 15 April 1971 (age 55)
Medal record
Men's Bobsleigh
Representing Switzerland
World Championships
Gold medal – first place	2007 St. Moritz	Four-man
Gold medal – first place	2009 Lake Placid	Two-man
Silver medal – second place	2007 St. Moritz	Two-man
Silver medal – second place	2009 Lake Placid	Mixed team
Bronze medal – third place	2007 St. Moritz	Mixed team
World Cup Championships
Gold medal – first place	2009–10	Two-man
Silver medal – second place	2007–08	Two-man
Silver medal – second place	2009–10	Combined
European Championships
Silver medal – second place	2004 St. Moritz	Two-man
Silver medal – second place	2004 St. Moritz	Four-man
Silver medal – second place	2006 St. Moritz	Two-man
Silver medal – second place	2007 Cortina	Two-man
Silver medal – second place	2010 Igls	Four-man
Bronze medal – third place	2007 Cortina	Four-man

Ivo Rüegg (born 15 April 1971) is a Swiss bobsledder who competed between 1996 and 2010. He won five medals at the FIBT World Championships with two golds (Two-man: 2009, Four-man: 2007), two silvers Two-man: 2007, Mixed team: 2009), and a bronze (Mixed team: 2007).

Rüegg grew up in Tuggen and took part in several different sports in his youth, including skiing, gymnastics, athletics, football and ice hockey. He acted as a forerunner for the prestigious Lauberhorn downhill race in Wengen, and also competed in Europa Cup and FIS Tour alpine skiing events before leaving the sport in the early 1990s due to back problems. In addition he competed in steinstossen (stone-throwing) competitions (winning multiple national individual and team titles) and decathlon during the 1990s, breaking the decathlon points record for the canton of Schwyz in 1994 and 1996 and setting a personal best of 7,071 points.

He first tried bobsleigh as a push athlete in 1992, before starting as a driver in 1996 and taking the Swiss junior title the same year and taking two bronze medals at the 1997 Junior World Championship. In his subsequent career he won one bronze and five silver medals in the Bobsleigh European Championship, one World Cup race (a two-man event at Cesana Pariol in 2007) and four Swiss national titles (two in each of the two-man and four man disciplines).

Rüegg competed in two Winter Olympics, earning his best finish of fourth in the two-man event at Vancouver in 2010.

He won the Bobsleigh World Cup championship in the two-man event in 2009-10. In May 2010 he announced his retirement from top-level sporting competition.

Ivo is the nephew of Tony Rüegg and Max Rüegg, the cousin of Ralph Rüegg, and the brother of Reto Rüegg, all of whom were also bobsledders.
