= Daniel Schmid (bobsledder) =

Swiss bobsledder (born 1976)

Daniel Schmid (born 22 January 1976) is a Swiss bobsledder who has competed since 1997. His best Bobsleigh World Cup finish was third in the two-man event at Igls in January 2007.

His best finish at the FIBT World Championships was fifth in the two-man event at St. Moritz in 2007.

Schmid was selected to compete in both the two-man and four-man events at the 2010 Winter Olympics, but withdrew from both events following crashes suffered at the Whistler Sliding Centre prior to the two-man event.
