= Wolfgang Stampfer =

Austrian bobsledder

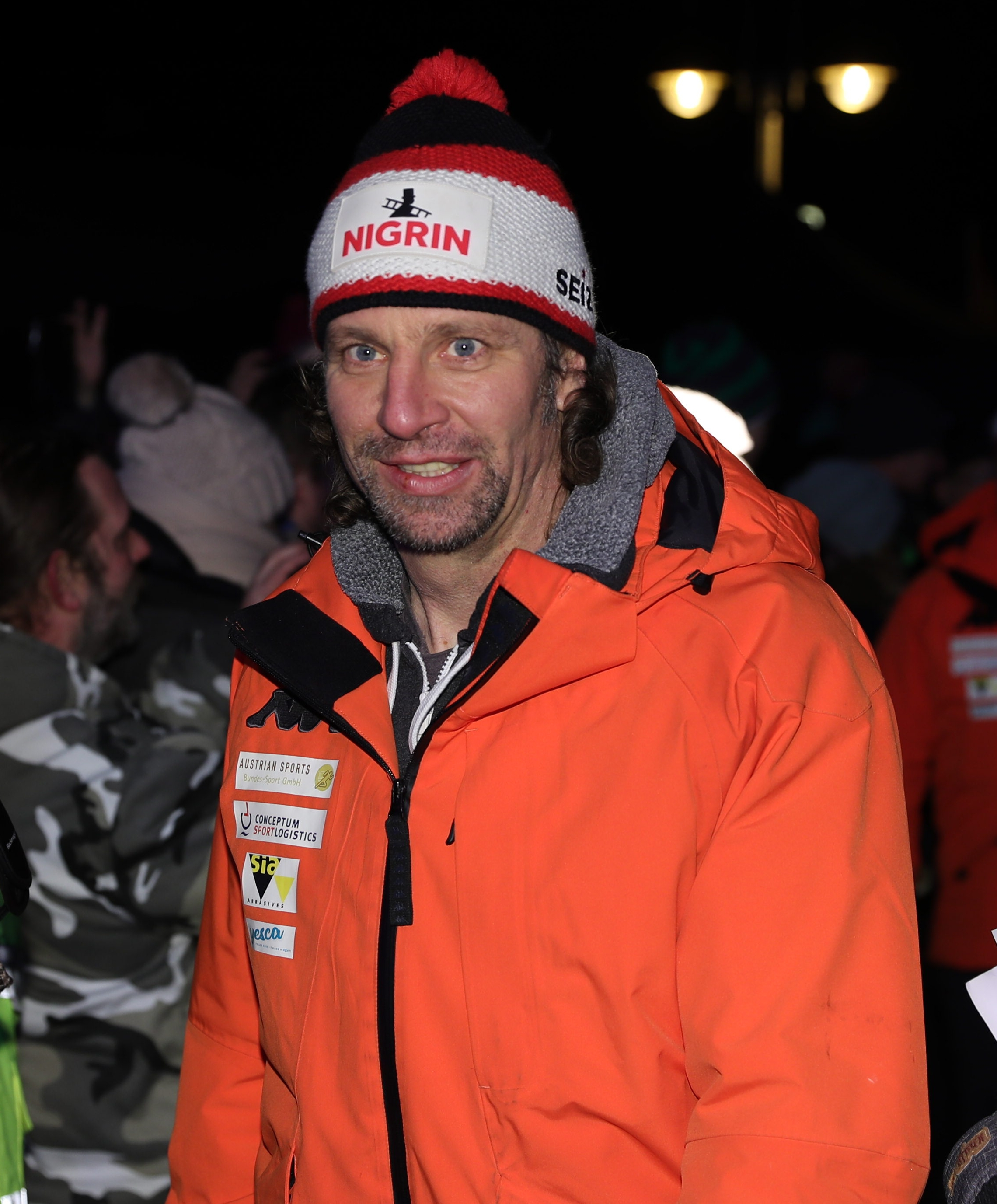
Wolfgang Stampfer

Wolfgang Stampfer (born May 3, 1972) is an Austrian bobsledder who has competed since 1993. Competing in three Winter Olympics, he earned his best finish of seventh in the two-man event at Salt Lake City in 2002. His best finish in the four-man was 13th in 2002 and 2006. As of 2026, he is fully retired from competing.

Stampfer's best finish at the FIBT World Championships was sixth in the two-man event at St. Moritz in 2007.
