= Intars Dīcmanis =

Latvian bobsledder (born 1979)

Personal information
- Nationality: Latvian
- Born: 22 September 1979 (age 45); Sigulda, Latvia
- Height: 197 cm (6 ft 6 in)
- Weight: 93 kg (205 lb)

Sport
- Sport: Bobsleigh

Intars Dīcmanis (born 22 September 1979) is a Latvian bobsledder. He competed at the 2002 Winter Olympics and the 2006 Winter Olympics.
