= FIBT World Championships 2009 =

Bobsleigh and skeleton competition

2009 World Championships
- Location: Lake Placid, New York
- Dates: February 20-March 1

The FIBT World Championships 2009, officially known as the Bauhaus FIBT Bobsleigh & Skeleton World Championships, February 20 to March 1, 2009, at the bobsleigh, luge, and skeleton track in Lake Placid, New York, for the ninth time, doing so previously in 1949, 1961, 1969, 1973, 1978, 1983, 1997 (skeleton), and 2003 (men's bobsleigh). Lake Placid was chosen 25–11 over Igls, Austria.

== Event preparations ==
Local schools were involved in a "Scholastic Sliding Challenge" (SSC) as part of the FIL World Luge Championships that was held in early February 2009. This program was developed at the 2007 World Luge Championships in Igls, then carried over to last year's World Luge Championships in Oberhof, Germany. 22 schools participated in the Lake Placid area that involved over 4000 students. The track was iced down on October 6, 2008, the earliest it has ever been iced in preparation for both the FIBT and FIL championships. Local media coverage was provided by WSLP-FM 93.3 in neighboring Saranac Lake. Online coverage in the United States was provided by Universal Sports.

== World Cup champions prior to the championships ==
As of February 15, 2009, the top three final World Cup positions were as follows (note: in bobsleigh, only the driver is shown):

Discipline	Leader	Second	Third
Bobsleigh men's combined	Russia - Alexandre Zoubkov	Switzerland - Beat Hefti	Germany - André Lange
Bobsleigh two-man	Switzerland - Beat Hefti	Germany - Thomas Florschütz	Germany - André Lange
Bobsleigh four-man	Russia - Alexandre Zoubkov	Latvia - Janis Minins	United States - Steven Holcomb
Bobsleigh two-woman	Germany - Sandra Kiriasis	Germany - Cathleen Martini	United States - Shauna Rohbock
Men's skeleton	Aleksandr Tretyakov (RUS)	Frank Rommel (GER)	Florian Grassl (GER)
Women's skeleton	Marion Trott (GER)	Shelley Rudman (GBR)	Katie Uhlaender (USA)

== Bobsleigh ==
=== Two-man ===
February 21–22, 2009, at 08:30 EST (13:30 UTC) for the last two runs. The eventual silver medalists from Germany had the fastest first run, but the Swiss duo of Rüegg and Grand had the fastest times for the remaining three runs. Three-time and defending champion André Lange of Germany finished fifth.

Pos	Team	Time
Gold	Switzerland II (Ivo Rüegg, Cédric Grand)	3:42.20
Silver	Germany I (Thomas Florschütz, Marc Kühne)	+0.22
Bronze	United States I (Steven Holcomb, Curtis Tomasevicz)	+0.40

=== Four-man ===
February 28 – March 1, 2009. The United States had the fastest time in each of the four runs to win their first bobsleigh gold medal at the World championships since 1959. This was Latvia's first ever medal at the championships while five-time and defending champion Lange of Germany would finish second.

Pos	Team	Time
Gold	United States I (Steven Holcomb, Justin Olsen, Steve Mesler, Curtis Tomasevicz)	3:36.61
Silver	Germany II (André Lange, Alexander Rödiger, Kevin Kuske, Martin Putze)	+ 0.97
Bronze	Latvia I (Jānis Miņins, Daumants Dreiškens, Oskars Melbārdis, Intars Dambis)	+ 1.00

=== Two-woman ===
February 20–21, 2009. The Canadian duo of Kaillie Humphries and Heather Moyse led after the first run while Rohbock/Meyers led after the second run before the British team of Minichiello/Cooke had the fastest third and fourth runs. Three-time defending champion Sandra Kiriasis of Germany finished seventh.

Pos	Team	Time
Gold	United Kingdom I (Nicola Minichiello, Gillian Cooke)	3:48.22
Silver	United States I (Shauna Rohbock, Elana Meyers)	+0.38
Bronze	Germany II (Cathleen Martini, Janine Tischer)	+0.62

== Skeleton ==
=== Men ===
February 27–28, 2009. The second run was cancelled after 20 skeleton racers had completed to irregular track conditions. Pengilly came from 15th after the first run to earn the silver medal. It was also Stähli's third gold medal which he earned on his 41st birthday.

Pos	Athlete	Time
Gold	Gregor Stähli (SUI)	2.46.58
Silver	Adam Pengilly (GBR)	+0.35
Bronze	Aleksandr Tretyakov (RUS)	+0.51

=== Women ===
February 26–27, 2009. Trott set the track record in the first run and had the fastest time in all three runs. The final run was plagued with heavy rainfall and strong winds up to 50 mph (85 km/h). It was Williams' first world championship medal.

Pos	Athlete	Time
Gold	Marion Trott (GER)	3:47.97
Silver	Amy Williams (GBR)	+0.59
Bronze	Kerstin Szymkowiak (GER)	+0.64

== Mixed team ==
February 22, 2009. The mixed team event – consisting of one run each of men's skeleton, women's skeleton, 2-man bobsleigh, and 2-women bobsleigh – debuted at the 2007 championships. Germany had the fastest times in the first and third runs to win its third straight mixed team championship.

Pos	Team	Time
Gold	Germany (Frank Rommel, Sandra Kiriasis, Patricia Polifka, Marion Trott, Thomas Florschütz, & Andreas Barucha)	3:45.41
Silver	Switzerland (Gregor Stähli, Sabrina Hafner, Anne Dietrich, Maya Pedersen, Ivo Rüegg, & Cédric Grand)	+0.24
Bronze	United States (Eric Bernotas, Shauna Rohbock, Valerie Fleming, Katie Uhlaender, Steven Holcomb, & Justin Olsen)	+0.25

== Medal table ==
Rank	Nation	Gold	Silver	Bronze	Total
1	Germany (GER)	2	2	2	6
2	Switzerland (SUI)	2	1	0	3
3	Great Britain (GBR)	1	2	0	3
4	United States (USA)	1	1	2	4
5	Latvia (LAT)	0	0	1	1
5	Russia (RUS)	0	0	1	1
Totals (6 entries)		6	6	6	18
