= Cédric Grand =

Swiss bobsledder (born 1976)

Personal information
- Born: 14 January 1976 (age 50)
Medal record
Bobsleigh
Representing Switzerland
Olympic Games
| Bronze medal – third place | 2006 Turin | Four-man |
World Championships
| Gold medal – first place | 2007 St. Moritz | Four-man |
| Gold medal – first place | 2009 Lake Placid | Two-man |
| Silver medal – second place | 2001 St. Moritz | Two-man |
| Silver medal – second place | 2009 Lake Placid | Mixed team |

Cédric Grand (born 14 January 1976) is a Swiss bobsledder who competed from 1997 to 2010. Competing in four Winter Olympics, he won a bronze medal in the four-man event at Turin in 2006. He was born in Geneva.

Grand also won four medals at the FIBT World Championships with two golds (two-man: 2009, four-man: 2007) and two silvers (two-man: 2001, mixed team: 2009).

Prior to his bobsledding career he competed in track and field. He was the 100 metres bronze medallist at the 1993 European Youth Olympic Days. He is the Switzerland record holder indoor over 60 metres with 6.60 seconds.
