= David Bissett (bobsleigh) =

Canadian bobsledder (born 1979)

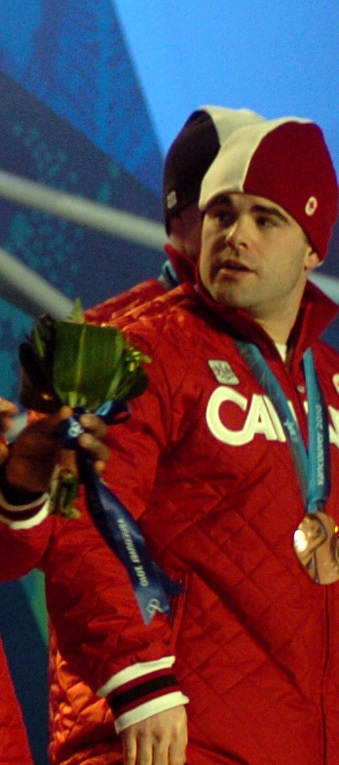

Personal information
- Born: September 26, 1979 (age 46) Lethbridge, Alberta, Canada
Medal record
Men's Bobsleigh
Representing Canada
Olympic Games
Bronze medal – third place	2010 Vancouver	Four-man
World Championships
Silver medal – second place	2007 St. Moritz	Four-man

David Bissett (born September 26, 1979) is a Canadian bobsledder who has competed since 2005. Competing in three Winter Olympics, he won a bronze medal in the four-man event at Vancouver in the 2010 Winter Olympics.

He won a silver medal in the four-man event at the 2007 FIBT World Championships in St. Moritz.

Bissett was born in Lethbridge, Alberta, and starred in Canadian football at the University of Alberta in Edmonton.
