= Beat Hefti =

Swiss bobsledder (born 1978)

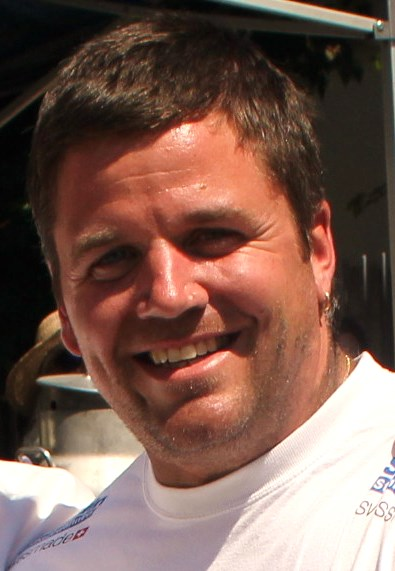

Personal information
- Born: 3 February 1978 (age 48) Herisau, Switzerland
Medal record
Olympic Games
Gold medal – first place	2014 Sochi	Two-man
Bronze medal – third place	2002 Salt Lake City	Two-man
Bronze medal – third place	2006 Turin	Two-man
Bronze medal – third place	2006 Turin	Four-man
World Championships
Gold medal – first place	2007 St. Moritz	Four-man
Silver medal – second place	1999 Cortina d'Ampezzo	Four-man
Silver medal – second place	2013 St. Moritz	Two-man
Bronze medal – third place	2001 St. Moritz	Two-man
Bronze medal – third place	2005 Calgary	Two-man
Bronze medal – third place	2016 Igls	Two-man

Beat Hefti (born 3 February 1978) is a Swiss bobsledder who has competed since the late 1990s. Competing in four Winter Olympics, he has won a total of four Olympic medals. A gold medal in Sochi (two-man, 2014), two bronze medals in Turin (two-man and four-man, 2006) and another bronze medal in Salt Lake City (two-man, 2002).

Hefti has also won four medals at the World Championships with one gold (Four-man: 2007), one silver (Four-man: 1999), and two bronzes (Two-man: 2001, 2005).

He won the Bobsleigh World Cup two-man title in 2009 and 2012.
