= FIBT World Championships 2007 =

Bobsleigh and skeleton competition

2007 World Championships
- Location: St. Moritz, Switzerland

The FIBT World Championships 2007 took place in St. Moritz, Switzerland for the record twenty-first time, doing so previously in 1931 (Four-man), 1935 (Four-man), 1937 (Four-man), 1938 (Two-man), 1939 (Two-man), 1947, 1955, 1957, 1959, 1965, 1970, 1974, 1977, 1982, 1987, 1989 (Skeleton), 1990 (Bobsleigh), 1997 (Bobsleigh), 1998 (Skeleton), and 2001 (Men's bobsleigh). The mixed team event consisting of one run each of men's skeleton, women's skeleton, 2-man bobsleigh, and 2-women bobsleigh debuted at these championships.

== Bobsleigh ==
=== Two man ===
Pos	Team	Athletes	Time	Behind
1st place, gold medalist(s)	Germany	André Lange; Kevin Kuske	4:26.62	–
2nd place, silver medalist(s)	Switzerland	Ivo Rüegg; Aleksandr Streltsov; Tommy Herzog (Note: Herzog replaced the injured Streltsov after the third heat of this event.)	4:26.81	+0.19
3rd place, bronze medalist(s)	Italy	Simone Bertazzo; Samuele Romanini	4:27.28	+0.66
4	United States	Steven Holcomb; Brock Kreitzburg	4:27.50	+0.88
5	Switzerland	Thomas Lamparter; Daniel Schmid	4:27.61	+0.99
6	Austria	Wolfgang Stampfer; Martin Lachkovics	4:28.15	+1.53
7	Canada	Pierre Lueders; David Bissett	4:28.24	+1.62

=== Four man ===
Pos	Team	Athletes	Time	Behind
1st place, gold medalist(s)	Switzerland	Ivo Rüegg; Thomas Lamparter; Beat Hefti; Cédric Grand	4:20.86	–
2nd place, silver medalist(s)	Canada	Pierre Lueders; Ken Kotyk; David Bissett; Lascelles Brown	4:21.09	+0.23
3rd place, bronze medalist(s)	Germany	André Lange; René Hoppe; Kevin Kuske; Martin Putze	4:21.10	+0.24

=== Two woman ===
Pos	Team	Athletes	Time	Behind
1st place, gold medalist(s)	Germany	Sandra Kiriasis; Romy Logsch	4:33.84	–
2nd place, silver medalist(s)	Germany	Cathleen Martini; Janine Tischer	4:35.89	+2.05
3rd place, bronze medalist(s)	United States	Shauna Rohbock; Valerie Fleming	4:36.27	+2.43

== Skeleton ==
=== Men ===
Pos	Athlete	Time
1st place, gold medalist(s)	Gregor Stähli (SUI)	
2nd place, silver medalist(s)	Eric Bernotas (USA)	
3rd place, bronze medalist(s)	Zach Lund (USA)	

=== Women ===
Pos	Athlete	Time
1st place, gold medalist(s)	Noelle Pikus-Pace (USA)	
2nd place, silver medalist(s)	Maya Pedersen (SUI)	
3rd place, bronze medalist(s)	Katie Uhlaender (USA)	

Pikus-Pace is the first American woman to win a gold medal in bobsleigh, luge, and skeleton at the World Championship level.

== Mixed team ==
Pos	Team	Time
1st place, gold medalist(s)	Germany (Frank Kleber, Sandra Kiriasis, Berit Wiacker, Monique Riekewald, Karl Angerer, Marc Kühne)	
2nd place, silver medalist(s)	United States (Eric Bernotas, Erin Pac, Emily Azevedo, Noelle Pikus-Pace, Mike Kohn, Curtis Tomasevicz)	
3rd place, bronze medalist(s)	Switzerland (Gregor Stähli, Sabrina Hafner, Katharina Sutter, Maya Pedersen, Ivo Rüegg, Thomas Lamparter)	

== Medal table ==
Rank	Nation	Gold	Silver	Bronze	Total
1	Germany (GER)	3	1	1	5
2	Switzerland (SUI)	2	2	1	5
3	United States (USA)	1	2	3	6
4	Canada (CAN)	0	1	0	1
5	Italy (ITA)	0	0	1	1
Totals (5 entries)		6	6	6	18
