= 2013–14 Bobsleigh World Cup =

International bobsleigh competition

Winners
- Two-man: Steven Holcomb; Steven Langton
- Four-man: Steven Holcomb; Curtis Tomasevicz; Steven Langton; Christopher Fogt
- Combined men's: Steven Holcomb
- Two-woman: Kaillie Humphries; Heather Moyse

Competitions
- Venues: 7 (8 events)

The 2013–14 Bobsleigh World Cup was a multi-race tournament over the winter season for bobsleigh, organised by the FIBT, which also organised in parallel the 2013–14 Skeleton World Cup. The season started on 30 November 2013 in Calgary, Canada, and ended on 26 January 2014 in Königssee, Germany.

== Calendar ==
Below is the schedule of the 2013/14 season. This edition was covering eight events on seven different tracks in five countries. The fact of having eight events in only seven tracks means that each discipline had one double race over the season.

Venue	Date	Details
(Canada) Calgary	30 November 2013	
(United States) Park City	7 December 2013	Double race for two-woman bobsleigh
(United States) Lake Placid	15 December 2013	Double race for two-man bobsleigh
(Germany) Winterberg	5 January 2014	Double race for four-man bobsleigh
(Switzerland) St. Moritz	12 January 2014	
(Austria) Igls	19 January 2014	
(Germany) Königssee	26 January 2014	

== Results ==
=== Two-man ===
Event:	Gold:	Time	Silver:	Time	Bronze:	Time
Calgary	Steven Holcomb; Steven Langton; United States	1:49.22 (54.51 / 54.71)	Beat Hefti; Alex Baumann; Switzerland	1:49.38 (54.58 / 54.80)	Chris Spring; Jesse Lumsden; Canada	1:49.42 (54.53 / 54.89)
Park City	Steven Holcomb; Christopher Fogt; United States	1:35.51 (47.76 / 47.75)	Nick Cunningham; Dallas Robinson; United States	1:35.76 (47.84 / 47.92)	Francesco Friedrich; Jannis Bäcker; Germany	1:35.80 (47.93 / 47.87)
Lake Placid (race 1)	Steven Holcomb; Steven Langton; United States	1:50.62 (54.93 / 55.69)	Beat Hefti; Alex Baumann; Switzerland	1:51.25 (55.48 / 55.77)	Nick Cunningham; Dallas Robinson; United States	1:51.26 (55.46 / 55.80)
Lake Placid (race 2)	Steven Holcomb; Christopher Fogt; United States	1:50.19 (55.09 / 55.10)	Nick Cunningham; Johnny Quinn; United States	1:50.74 (55.25 / 55.49)	Cory Butner; Charles Berkeley; United States	1:50.85 (55.32 / 55.53)
Winterberg	Beat Hefti; Alex Baumann; Switzerland	1:52.68 (56.16 / 56.52)	Alexander Zubkov; Alexey Voevoda; Russia	1:53.14 (56.63 / 56.51)	Cory Butner; Charles Berkeley; United States	1:53.15 (56.49 / 56.66)
St. Moritz	Beat Hefti; Alex Baumann; Switzerland	2:13.40 (1:06.74 / 1:06.66)	Alexander Zubkov; Alexey Voevoda; Russia	2:13.58 (1:06.81 / 1:06.77)	Francesco Friedrich; Jannis Bäcker; Germany	2:13.70 (1:06.64 / 1:07.06)
Igls	Steven Holcomb; Steven Langton; United States	1:43.72 (51.78 / 51.94)	Beat Hefti; Thomas Amrhein; Switzerland	1:43.95 (52.00 / 51.95)	Alexandr Zubkov; Dmitry Trunenkov; Russia	1:44.00 (52.02 / 51.98)
Königssee	Justin Kripps; Bryan Barnett; Canada	1:39.71 (49.91 / 49.80)	Beat Hefti; Alex Baumann; Switzerland	1:39.86 (50.02 / 49.84)	Lyndon Rush; Lascelles Brown; Canada	1:40.03 (50.03 / 50.00)

=== Four-man ===
Event:	Gold:	Time	Silver:	Time	Bronze:	Time
Calgary	Steven Holcomb; Curtis Tomasevicz; Steven Langton; Christopher Fogt; United States	1:48.56 (54.08 / 54.48)	Maximilian Arndt; Marko Hübenbecker; Alexander Rödiger; Martin Putze; Germany	1:48.65 (54.14 / 54.51)		
Calgary	Steven Holcomb; Curtis Tomasevicz; Steven Langton; Christopher Fogt; United States	1:48.56 (54.08 / 54.48)	Alexander Zubkov; Alexey Negodaylo; Dmitry Trunenkov; Maxim Mokrousov; Russia	1:48.65 (54.16 / 54.49)		
Park City	Steven Holcomb; Curtis Tomasevicz; Steven Langton; Christopher Fogt; United States	1:34.76 (47.36 / 47.40)	Maximilian Arndt; Marko Hübenbecker; Alexander Rödiger; Martin Putze; Germany	1:35.11 (47.36 / 47.75)	Alexander Kasjanov; Philipp Egorov; Maxim Belugin; Aleksei Pushkarev; Russia	1:35.12 (47.36 / 47.76)
Lake Placid	Steven Holcomb; Curtis Tomasevicz; Steven Langton; Christopher Fogt; United States	1:50.15 (54.97 / 55.18)	John James Jackson; Stuart Benson; Bruce Tasker; Joel Fearon; United Kingdom	1:50.22 (55.22 / 55.00)	Thomas Florschuetz; Ronny Listner; Kevin Kuske; Christian Poser; Germany	1:50.40 (55.17 / 55.23)
Winterberg (race 1)	Maximilian Arndt; Marko Hübenbecker; Alexander Rödiger; Martin Putze; Germany	1:49.97 (54.86 / 55.11)	Francesco Friedrich; Jannis Bäcker; Gregor Bermbach; Thorsten Margis; Germany	1:50.14 (55.05 / 55.09)	Alexander Zubkov; Alexey Negodaylo; Dmitry Trunenkov; Aleksei Pushkarev; Russia	1:50.17 (55.04 / 55.13)
Winterberg (race 2)	Maximilian Arndt; Marko Hübenbecker; Alexander Rödiger; Martin Putze; Germany	1:50.09 (55.02 / 55.07)	Francesco Friedrich; Jannis Bäcker; Gregor Bermbach; Thorsten Margis; Germany	1:50.32 (55.05 / 55.27)	Thomas Florschuetz; Joshua Bluhm; Kevin Kuske; Christian Poser; Germany	1:50.49 (55.21 / 55.28)
St. Moritz	Oskars Melbārdis; Daumants Dreiškens; Arvis Vilkaste; Jānis Strenga; Latvia	2:09.52 (1:04.75 / 1:04.77)	Alexandr Zubkov; Alexey Negodaylo; Dmitry Trunenkov; Alexey Voyevoda; Russia	2:09.75 (1:04.79 / 1:04.96)	Maximilian Arndt; Marko Hübenbecker; Alexander Rödiger; Martin Putze; Germany	2:09.97 (1:05.08 / 1:04.89)
Igls	Oskars Melbārdis; Daumants Dreiškens; Arvis Vilkaste; Jānis Strenga; Latvia	1:42.22 (51.15 / 51.07)	Steven Holcomb; Curtis Tomasevicz; Steven Langton; Christopher Fogt; United States	1:42.33 (51.14 / 51.19)	Thomas Florschütz; Joshua Bluhm; Kevin Kuske; Christian Poser; Germany	1:42.43 (51.30 / 51.13)
Königssee	Steven Holcomb; Curtis Tomasevicz; Steven Langton; Christopher Fogt; United States	1:38.54 (49.11 / 49.43)	Beat Hefti; Alex Baumann; Juerg Egger; Thomas Amrhein; Switzerland	1:38.63 (49.18 / 49.45)	Lyndon Rush; Lascelles Brown; David Bissett; Neville Wright; Canada	1:38.84 (49.27 / 49.57)

=== Two-woman ===
Event:	Gold:	Time	Silver:	Time	Bronze:	Time
Calgary	Kaillie Humphries; Heather Moyse; Canada	1:52.77 (56.88 / 55.89)	Elana Meyers; Aja Evans; United States	1:53.33 (57.07 / 56.26)	Jamie Greubel; Katie Eberling; United States	1:53.63 (57.28 / 56.34)
Park City (race 1)	Elana Meyers; Aja Evans; United States	1:37.67 (48.76 / 48.91)	Kaillie Humphries; Heather Moyse; Canada	1:37.80 (48.75 / 49.05)	Jamie Greubel; Katie Eberling; United States	1:37.86 (48.78 / 49.08)
Park City (race 2)	Elana Meyers; Aja Evans; United States	1:38.61 (49.25 / 49.36)	Jamie Greubel; Lolo Jones; United States	1:39.24 (49.42 / 49.82)		
Park City (race 2)	Elana Meyers; Aja Evans; United States	1:38.61 (49.25 / 49.36)	Jazmine Fenlator; Lauryn Williams; United States	1:39.24 (49.44 / 49.80)		
Lake Placid	Kaillie Humphries; Heather Moyse; Canada	1:53.66 (56.63 / 57.03)	Elana Meyers; Lauryn Williams; United States	1:53.78 (56.65 / 57.13)	Jamie Greubel; Katie Eberling; United States	1:54.00 (56.93 / 57.07)
Winterberg	Sandra Kiriasis; Franziska Fritz; Germany	1:55.41 (57.83 / 57.58)	Elana Meyers; Lolo Jones; United States	1:55.42 (57.90 / 57.52)	Anja Schneiderheinze-Stöckel; Stephanie Schneider; Germany	1:55.48 (57.79 / 57.69)
St. Moritz	Kaillie Humphries; Heather Moyse; Canada	2:16.96 (1:08.81 / 1:08.15)	Cathleen Martini; Christin Senkel; Germany	2:17.14 (1:08.54 / 1:08.60)	Fabienne Meyer; Tanja Mayer; Switzerland	2:17.15 (1:08.41 / 1:08.74)
Igls	Jamie Greubel; Lauryn Williams; United States	1:46.28 (53.01 / 53.27)	Elana Meyers; Aja Evans; United States	1:46.41 (53.07 / 53.34)	Anja Schneiderheinze-Stöckel; Stephanie Schneider; Germany	1:46.42 (53.11 / 53.31)
Königssee	Fabienne Meyer; Tanja Mayer; Switzerland	1:44.01 (52.14 /51.87)	Elana Meyers; Aja Evans; United States	1:44.27 (52.60 /51.67)	Kaillie Humphries; Heather Moyse; Canada	1:44.29 (52.12 /52.17)

== See also ==
- Bobsleigh at the 2014 Winter Olympics
