= 2009–10 Bobsleigh World Cup =

Winners
- Combined men's: Steven Holcomb (USA)
- Two-man: Ivo Rüegg (SUI)
- Four-man: Steven Holcomb (USA)
- Two-woman: Sandra Kiriasis (GER)

Competitions
- Venues: 8

The 2009–10 Bobsleigh World Cup was a multi race tournament over a season for bobsleigh. The season started on 12 November 2009 in Park City, Utah, United States and ended on 24 January 2010 in Igls, Austria (southeast of Innsbruck). The World Cup was organised by the FIBT who also run world cups and championships in skeleton. For this season, it was sponsored by Intersport.

== Calendar ==
Below is the schedule of the 2009/10 season.

Venue	Date	Details
Park City	12–14 November 2009	
Lake Placid	20–22 November 2009	
Cesana	4–6 December 2009	
Winterberg	11–13 December 2009	
Altenberg	18–20 December 2009	
Königssee	8–10 January 2010	
St. Moritz	15–17 January 2010	
Igls	22–24 January 2010	Also serves as FIBT European championships

== Results ==
=== Two-man ===
Event:	Gold:	Time	Silver:	Time	Bronze:	Time
Park City	Beat Hefti; Alex Baumann; Switzerland	1:37.08 (48.48 / 48.60)	Todd Hays; Steven Langton; United States	1:37.19 (48.53 / 48.66)	Ivo Rüegg; Cedric Grand; Switzerland	1:37.25 (48.55 / 48.70)
Lake Placid	John Napier; Charles Berkeley; United States	1:53.62 (56.75 / 56.87)	Steven Holcomb; Justin Olsen; United States	1:53.88 (57.07 / 56.81)	Ivo Rüegg; Roman Handschin; Switzerland	1:53.91 (56.90 / 57.01)
Cesana	Beat Hefti; Thomas Lamparter; Switzerland	1:52.37 (55.99 / 56.38)	Ivo Rüegg; Cedric Grand; Switzerland	1:52.59 (55.98 / 56.61)	Steven Holcomb; Curtis Tomasevicz; United States	1:52.87 (56.29 / 56.58)
Winterberg	Beat Hefti; Thomas Lamparter; Switzerland	1:53.17 (56.73 / 56.44)	Karl Angerer; Gregor Bermbach; Germany	1:53.24 (56.71 / 56.53)	Ivo Rüegg; Roman Handschin; Switzerland	1:53.28 (56.72 / 56.56)
Altenberg	André Lange; Kevin Kuske; Germany	1:49.81 (54.80 / 55.01)	Thomas Florschütz; Marc Kühne; Germany	1:50.47 (55.14 / 55.33)	Ivo Rüegg; Cedric Grand; Switzerland	1:50.71 (55.21 / 55.50)
Königssee	Thomas Florschütz; Richard Adjei; Germany	1:38.17 (49.08 / 49.093)	André Lange; Kevin Kuske; Germany	1:38.22 (49.22 / 49.00)	Beat Hefti; Thomas Lamparter; Switzerland	1:38.23 (49.23 / 49.00)
St. Moritz	Lyndon Rush; Lascelles Brown; Canada; André Lange; Kevin Kuske; Germany	2:12.34 (1:06.52/1:05.82) 2:12.34 (1:06.65/1:05.69)	-	-	Edwin Van Calker; Sybren Jansma; Netherlands	2:12.48 (1:06.42/1:06.06)
Igls	Beat Hefti; Thomas Lamparter; Switzerland	1:44.01 (52.03 / 51.98)	André Lange; Kevin Kuske; Germany	1:44.12 (52.12 / 52.00)	Daniel Schmid; Juerg Egger; Switzerland	1:44.37 (52.35 / 52.02)

=== Four-man ===
Event:	Gold:	Time	Silver:	Time	Bronze:	Time
Park City	Lyndon Rush; Chris le Bihan; Dan Humphries; Lascelles Brown; Canada	1:36.43 (48.35 / 48.08)	Jānis Miņins; Daumants Dreiškens; Oskars Melbārdis; Intars Dambis; Latvia; Dmitry Abramovitch; Filipp Yegorov; Dmitriy Stepushkin; Sergey Prudnikov; Russia	1:36.45 (48.30 / 48.15) 1:36.45 (48.40 / 48.05)	-	-
Lake Placid	Steven Holcomb; Justin Olsen; Steve Mesler; Curtis Tomasevicz; United States	1:49.60 (54.75 / 54.85)	John Napier; Jamie Moriarty; Steven Langton; Christopher Fogt; United States	1:50.04 (54.86 / 55.18)	Wolfgang Stampfer; Johannes Wipplinger; Juergen Mayer; Martin Lachkovics; Austria	1:50.14 (54.79 / 55.35)
Cesana	Steven Holcomb; Justin Olsen; Steve Mesler; Curtis Tomasevicz; United States	1:51.22 (55.51 / 55.71)	Ivo Rüegg; Roman Handschin; Cedric Grand; Patrick Bloechliger; Switzerland	1:51.63 (55.81 / 55.82)	Lyndon Rush; Chris le Bihan; Dan Humphries; Lascelles Brown; Canada	1:51.67 (55.76 / 55.91)
Winterberg	Steven Holcomb; Justin Olsen; Steve Mesler; Curtis Tomasevicz; United States	1:50.70 (55.39 / 55.31)	André Lange; René Hoppe; Kevin Kuske; Martin Putze; Germany	1:50.80 (55.51 / 55.29)	Karl Angerer; Andreas Udvari; Alex Mann; Gregor Bermbach; Germany	1:50.95 (55.55 / 55.40)
Altenberg	André Lange; René Hoppe; Kevin Kuske; Martin Putze; Germany	1:47.23 (53.54 / 53.69)	Steven Holcomb; Justin Olsen; Steve Mesler; Curtis Tomasevicz; United States	1:47.99 (54.04 / 53.95)	Yevgeni Popov; Denis Moiseychenkov; Andrey Yurkov; Alexey Kireev; Russia	1:48.23 (54.09 / 54.14)
Königssee	André Lange; René Hoppe; Kevin Kuske; Martin Putze; Germany	1:37.07 (48.64 / 48.43)	Steven Holcomb; Justin Olsen; Steve Mesler; Curtis Tomasevicz; United States	1:37.10 (48.68 / 48.42)	John Napier; Charles Berkeley; Steven Langton; Christopher Fogt; United States	1:37.31 (48.72 / 48.59)
St. Moritz	André Lange; René Hoppe; Kevin Kuske; Martin Putze; Germany	2:10.13 (1:05.58 / 1:04.55)	Karl Angerer; Alex Mann; Andreas Bredau; Gregor Bermbach; Germany	2:10.38 (1:05.58 / 1:04.80)	Alexandr Zubkov; Filipp Yegorov; Dmitry Trunenkov; Petr Moiseev; Russia	2:10.48 (1:05.67 / 1:04.81)
Igls	André Lange; René Hoppe; Kevin Kuske; Martin Putze; Germany	1:42.59 (51.37 / 51.22)	Ivo Rüegg; Roman Handschin; Thomas Lamparter; Cedric Grand; Switzerland	1:42.64 (51.35 / 51.29)	Thomas Florschütz; Ronny Listner; Richard Adjei; Andreas Barucha; Germany	1:42.67 (51.43 / 51.24)

=== Two-woman ===
Event:	Gold:	Time	Silver:	Time	Bronze:	Time
Park City	Cathleen Martini; Romy Logsch; Germany	1:39.92 (50.01 / 49.91)	Sandra Kiriasis; Berit Wiacker; Germany	1:40.12 (50.05 / 50.07)	Erin Pac; Michelle Rzepka; United States	1:40.32 (50.13 / 50.19)
Lake Placid	Cathleen Martini; Romy Logsch; Germany	1:56.15 (58.27 / 57.88)	Sandra Kiriasis; Janine Tischer; Germany	1:56.56 (58.28 / 58.28)	Kaillie Humphries; Heather Moyse; Canada	1:57.23 (58.67 / 58.56)
Cesana	Shauna Rohbock; Michelle Rzepka; United States	1:56.09 (57.96 / 58.13)	Cathleen Martini; Romy Logsch; Germany	1:56.43 (58.10 / 58.33)	Sandra Kiriasis; Berit Wiacker; Germany	1:56.45 (58.03 / 58.42)
Winterberg	Cathleen Martini; Romy Logsch; Germany	1:56.65 (58.52 / 58.13)	Sandra Kiriasis; Berit Wiacker; Germany	1:57.26 (58.93 / 58.33)	Erin Pac; Elana Meyers; United States	1:57.27 (58.65 / 58.62)
Altenberg	Kaillie Humphries; Heather Moyse; Canada	1:53.60 (56.79 / 56.81)	Helen Upperton; Jennifer Ciochetti; Canada	1:54.03 (57.06 / 56.97)	Shauna Rohbock; Michelle Rzepka; United States	1:54.11 (57.17 / 56.94)
Königssee	Cathleen Martini; Romy Logsch; Germany	1:41.04 (50.67 / 50.37)	Kaillie Humphries; Heather Moyse; Canada	1:41.33 (50.80 / 50.53)	Sandra Kiriasis; Christin Senkel; Germany	1:41.43 (50.79 / 50.64)
St. Moritz	Cathleen Martini; Romy Logsch; Germany	2:14.89 (1:07.56 / 1:07.33)	Sandra Kiriasis; Christin Senkel; Germany	2:14.90 (1:07.41 / 1:07.49)	Claudia Schramm; Berit Wiacker; Germany	2:15.07 (1:07.59 / 1:07.48)
Igls	Shauna Rohbock; Michelle Rzepka; United States	1:47.13 (53.66 / 53.47)	Cathleen Martini; Romy Logsch; Germany	1:47.44 (53.91 / 53.53)	Kaillie Humphries; Heather Moyse; Canada	1:47.46 (53.84 / 53.62)

== Standings ==
=== Two-man ===
Pos.	Bobsledder	PKC	LKP	CES	WIN	ALT	KON	SMO	IGL	Points
1.	Ivo Rüegg (SUI)	3	3	2	3	3	4	8	9	1514
2.	Thomas Florschütz (GER)	8	5	9	5	2	1	6	5	1475
3.	Karl Angerer (GER)	6	8	6	2	4	6	4	4	1474
4.	Beat Hefti (SUI)	1	–	1	1	6	3	7	1	1444
5.	André Lange (GER)	10	–	10	6	1	2	1	2	1334
6.	Lyndon Rush (CAN)	7	7	13	11	5	5	1	10	1329
7.	Steven Holcomb (USA)	4	2	3	7	19	9	14	5	1292
8.	John Napier (USA)	12	1	5	10	10	11	15	13	1185
9.	Alexandr Zubkov (RUS)	5	6	4	8	8	13	23	11	1178
10.	Pierre Lueders (CAN)	9	4	8	19	–	8	9	8	1050
11.	Daniel Schmid (SUI)	13	17	15	4	–	10	5	3	1032
12.	Dmitry Abramovitch (RUS)	17	10	11	12	11	14	10	15	992
13.	Simone Bertazzo (ITA)	13	14	7	9	13	24	13	16	933
14.	Edwin Van Calker (NED)	19	16	23	24	12	7	3	7	929
15.	Jānis Miņins (LAT)	11	13	12	13	9	17	24	12	917
16.	Yevgeni Popov (RUS)	24	12	14	14	7	23	16	21	773
17.	Jürgen Loacker (AUT)	16	11	16	18	16	20	26	14	720
18.	Ivo Danilevič (CZE)	18	21	16	21	14	12	18	17	708
19.	Fabrizio Tosini (ITA)	22	18	19	20	15	22	20	20	574
20.	Dawid Kupczyk (POL)	27	20	21	17	21	15	25	24	506
28.	Todd Hays (USA)	2	–	–	–	–	–	–	–	210

=== Four-man ===
Pos.	Bobsledder	PKC	LKP	CES	WIN	ALT	KON	SMO	IGL	Points
1.	Steven Holcomb (USA)	7	1	1	1	2	2	4	8	1615
2.	Jānis Miņins (LAT)	2	5	4	7	5	4	27	4	1354
3.	André Lange (GER)	17	–	11	2	1	1	1	1	1334
4.	John Napier (USA)	8	2	9	5	10	3	11	13	1306
5.	Thomas Florschütz (GER)	5	8	8	4	7	6	21	3	1302
6.	Ivo Rüegg (SUI)	10	4	2	16	11	12	5	2	1300
7.	Karl Angerer (GER)	24	13	7	3	8	5	2	4	1279
8.	Lyndon Rush (CAN)	1	7	3	12	4	10	25	7	1265
9.	Dmitry Abramovitch (RUS)	2	16	15	6	6	7	24	6	1151
10.	Alexandr Zubkov (RUS)	13	–	6	10	9	8	3	9	1104
11.	Edwin Van Calker (NED)	10	6	13	9	dnf	13	8	11	1008
12.	Pierre Lueders (CAN)	10	9	10	13	–	9	6	16	984
13.	Yevgeni Popov (RUS)	21	11	18	11	3	16	12	10	982
14.	Edgars Maskalāns (LAT)	9	12	12	14	12	14	16	13	976
15.	Ivo Danilevič (CZE)	14	10	14	17	13	17	18	15	848
16.	Beat Hefti (SUI)	15	–	5	8	dns	11	23	12	762
17.	Jürgen Loacker (AUT)	19	19	16	15	15	19	14	18	718
18.	Dawid Kupczyk (POL)	20	17	19	19	16	15	10	20	716
19.	Wolfgang Stampfer (AUT)	4	3	–	–	–	18	9	19	698
20.	Simone Bertazzo (ITA)	22	15	17	20	14	21	19	22	620

=== Two-woman ===
Pos.	Bobsledder	PKC	LKP	CES	WIN	ALT	KON	SMO	IGL	Points
1.	Sandra Kiriasis (GER)	2	2	3	2	4	3	2	6	1608
2.	Kaillie Humphries (CAN)	6	3	6	5	1	2	4	3	1563
3.	Cathleen Martini (GER)	1	1	2	1	–	1	1	2	1545
4.	Shauna Rohbock (USA)	9	5	1	4	3	7	5	1	1530
5.	Helen Upperton (CAN)	5	6	4	7	2	4	9	7	1442
6.	Erin Pac (USA)	3	7	5	3	6	5	13	4	1424
7.	Claudia Schramm (GER)	10	4	10	6	5	5	3	11	1360
8.	Sabrina Hafner (SUI)	8	9	12	8	7	12	6	5	1256
9.	Bree Schaaf (USA)	4	9	6	10	13	10	11	13	1184
10.	Amanda Stepenko (CAN)	11	12	9	12	8	10	15	7	1120
11.	Maya Bamert (SUI)	12	11	13	11	9	12	10	9	1096
12.	Esme Kamphuis (NED)	14	14	16	9	10	9	14	15	984
13.	Fabienne Meyer (SUI)	15	13	11	13	20	16	8	10	948
14.	Nicole Minichiello (GBR)	7	8	8	–	–	8	7	14	928
15.	Paula Walker (GBR)	16	15	14	15	11	15	16	18	832
16.	Anastasiya Skulkina (RUS)	13	16	14	17	14	14	17	19	802
17.	Olga Fyodorova (RUS)	18	18	17	18	12	17	12	12	800
18.	Jessica Gillarduzzi (ITA)	17	19	20	16	15	19	–	16	600
19.	Elfje Willemsen (BEL)	20	17	21	14	16	21	22	–	544
20.	Christina Hengster (AUT)	22	20	18	23	18	24	21	17	529
