= Bobsleigh at the 2014 Winter Olympics – Two-man =

Two-man at the XXII Olympic Winter Games
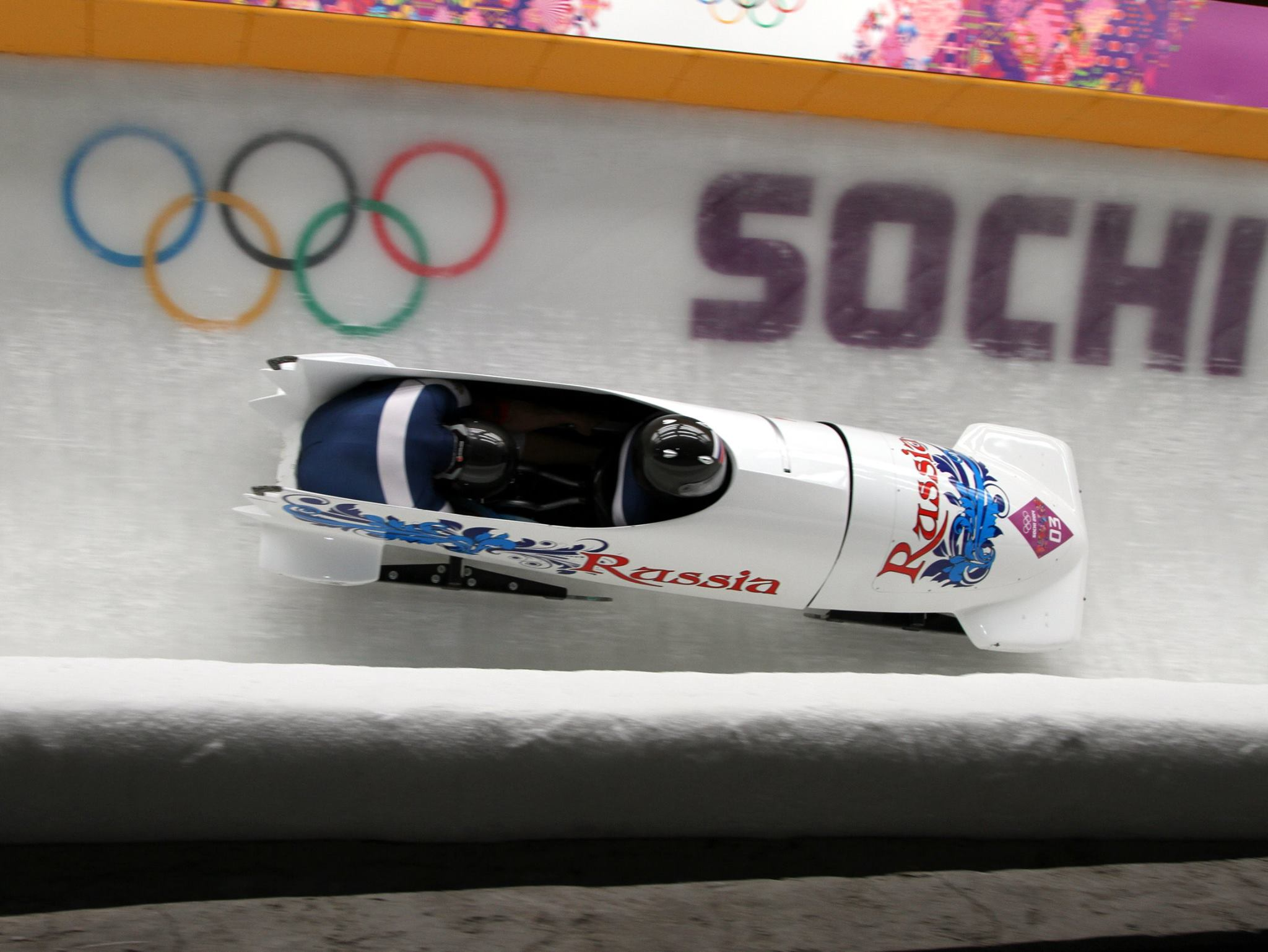
- Disqualified Russian team
- Dates: 16–17 February 2014
- Competitors: 60 from 20 nations
- Winning time: 3:46.05

Medalists
1st place, gold medalist(s)		Beat Hefti; Alex Baumann	Switzerland
2nd place, silver medalist(s)		Steven Holcomb; Steven Langton	United States
3rd place, bronze medalist(s)		Oskars Melbārdis; Daumants Dreiškens	Latvia

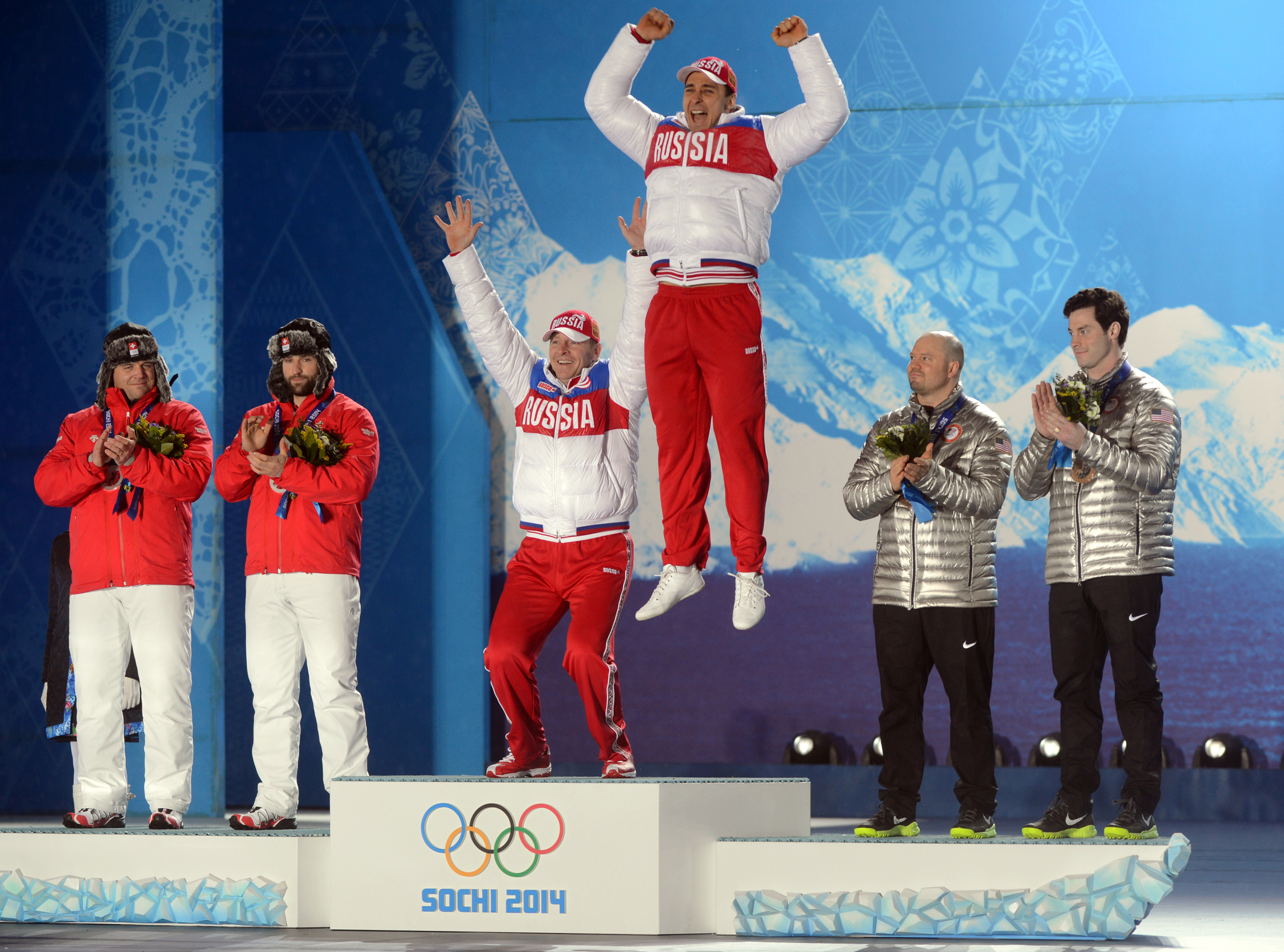
The original podium.

The two-man bobsleigh competition at the 2014 Winter Olympics in Sochi, Russia was held at the Sliding Center Sanki near Krasnaya Polyana, Russia on 16–17 February.

On 24 November 2017, the IOC imposed a life ban on bobsledder Alexandr Zubkov. He was stripped of 2 gold medals (two-man and four-man bobsleigh). On 18 December 2017, Zubkov's two-man bobsleigh teammate Alexey Voyevoda also received a lifetime ban by the IOC due to doping violations at the 2014 Winter Olympics. On 29 November 2017, IOC also sanctioned Alexander Kasjanov for doping offences and stripped his team of their results. The IOC requested that the FIBT modify the results, and the medals were redistributed accordingly.

== Records ==
While the IOC does not consider bobsled times eligible for Olympic records, the FIBT does maintain records for both the start and a complete run at each track it competes.

== Results ==
Rank	Bib	Country	Athletes	Run 1	Run 2	Run 3	Run 4	Total	Behind
DSQ	3	Russia (RUS-1)	Alexandr Zubkov; Alexey Voyevoda	56.25 TR	56.57	56.08 TR	56.49	3:45.39	—
1st place, gold medalist(s)	2	Switzerland (SUI-1)	Beat Hefti; Alex Baumann	56.46	56.68	56.26	56.65	3:46.05	+0.66
2nd place, silver medalist(s)	1	United States (USA-1)	Steven Holcomb; Steven Langton	56.34	56.84	56.41	56.68	3:46.27	+0.88
DSQ	13	Russia (RUS-2)	Alexander Kasjanov; Maxim Belugin	56.69	56.60	56.44	56.57	3:46.30	+0.91
3rd place, bronze medalist(s)	12	Latvia (LAT-1)	Oskars Melbārdis; Daumants Dreiškens	56.62	56.68	56.43	56.75	3:46.48	+1.09
4	10	Canada (CAN-3)	Justin Kripps; Bryan Barnett	56.56	56.70	56.42	56.94	3:46.62	+1.23
5	9	Canada (CAN-2)	Chris Spring; Jesse Lumsden	56.66	56.77	56.62	56.74	3:46.79	+1.40
6	4	Germany (GER-1)	Francesco Friedrich; Jannis Bäcker	56.50	56.88	56.63	56.84	3:46.85	+1.46
7	7	Canada (CAN-1)	Lyndon Rush; Lascelles Brown	56.61	56.87	56.64	56.76	3:46.88	+1.49
8	14	Switzerland (SUI-2)	Rico Peter; Juerg Egger	56.96	56.68	56.60	56.72	3:46.96	+1.57
9	8	Germany (GER-2)	Thomas Florschütz; Kevin Kuske	56.89	56.87	56.77	56.71	3:47.00	+1.61
10	5	United States (USA-2)	Cory Butner; Christopher Fogt	56.45	57.11	56.77	56.86	3:47.19	+1.80
11	6	United States (USA-3)	Nick Cunningham; Dallas Robinson	56.73	57.07	56.98	56.91	3:47.69	+2.30
12	16	Italy (ITA-1)	Simone Bertazzo; Simone Fontana	57.06	57.02	56.90	56.84	3:47.82	+2.43
13	11	Germany (GER-3)	Maximilian Arndt; Alexander Rödiger	56.98	56.92	57.22	57.08	3:48.20	+2.81
14	15	Latvia (LAT-2)	Oskars Kibermanis; Vairis Leiboms	57.11	57.22	57.00	57.19	3:48.52	+3.13
15	22	Romania (ROM-1)	Nicolae Istrate; Florin Cezar Crăciun	57.39	57.19	57.24	57.16	3:48.98	+3.59
16	17	South Korea (KOR-1)	Won Yun-Jong; Seo Young-Woo	57.41	57.20	57.58	57.08	3:49.27	+3.88
17	23	Netherlands (NED-1)	Edwin van Calker; Bror van der Zijde	57.54	57.46	57.38	56.95	3:49.33	+3.94
18	18	France (FRA-1)	Loic Costerg; Romain Heinrich	57.44	57.04	57.65	57.23	3:49.36	+3.97
19	21	Monaco (MON-1)	Patrice Servelle; Sébastien Gattuso	57.50	57.30	57.80		2:52.60	
20	19	Austria (AUT-1)	Benjamin Maier; Markus Sammer	57.57	57.74	57.41		2:52.71	
21	25	Great Britain (GBR-1)	Lamin Deen; John Baines	57.54	57.81	57.38		2:52.73	
22	30	Czech Republic (CZE-1)	Jan Vrba; Michal Vacek	57.72	57.75	57.71		2:53.18	
23	20	South Korea (KOR-2)	Kim Dong-hyun; Jun Jung-Lin	57.78	57.76	57.73		2:53.27	
24	27	Australia (AUS-1)	Heath Spence; Duncan Harvey	57.96	57.99	57.78		2:53.73	
25	26	Poland (POL-1)	Dawid Kupczyk; Paweł Mróz	57.90	58.07	57.98		2:53.95	
26	24	Japan (JPN-1)	Hiroshi Suzuki; Hisashi Miyazaki	57.91	58.21	58.02		2:54.14	
27	28	Jamaica (JAM-1)	Winston Watts; Marvin Dixon	58.42	58.81	58.17		2:55.40	
	29	Serbia (SRB-1)	Vuk Rađenović; Aleksandar Bundalo	58.31	58.56	DNS			
