= Bobsleigh at the 2014 Winter Olympics =

Bobsleigh at the XXII Olympic Winter Games
- Venue: Sliding Center Sanki, Krasnaya Polyana, Russia
- Dates: 16–23 February 2014
- Competitors: 169 from 23 nations

Bobsleigh at the 2014 Winter Olympics was held at the Sliding Center Sanki near Krasnaya Polyana, Russia. The three events took place between 16–23 February 2014.

== Competition schedule ==
The following is the competition schedule for all three events.

All times are Moscow Time (UTC+4).

Date	Time	Event
16 February	20:15	Two-man runs 1 and 2
17 February	18:30	Two-man runs 3 and 4
18 February	19:15	Two-woman runs 1 and 2
19 February	20:15	Two-woman runs 3 and 4
22 February	20:30	Four-man runs 1 and 2
23 February	13:30	Four-man runs 3 and 4

== Medal summary ==
=== Medal table ===
Rank	Nation	Gold	Silver	Bronze	Total
1	Latvia	1	0	1	2
2	Canada	1	0	0	1
2	Switzerland	1	0	0	1
4	United States	0	3	1	4
5	Great Britain	0	0	1	1
Totals (5 entries)		3	3	3	9

=== Events ===
Event	Gold		Silver		Bronze	
Two-man^{[a]}	Switzerland; Beat Hefti; Alex Baumann	3:46.05	United States; Steven Holcomb; Steven Langton	3:46.27	Latvia; Oskars Melbārdis; Daumants Dreiskens	3:46.48
Four-man^{[a]}	Latvia; Oskars Melbārdis; Arvis Vilkaste; Daumants Dreiškens; Jānis Strenga	3:40.69	United States; Steven Holcomb; Steven Langton; Curtis Tomasevicz; Christopher Fogt	3:40.99	Great Britain; John James Jackson; Stuart Benson; Bruce Tasker; Joel Fearon	3:41.10
Two-woman	Canada; Kaillie Humphries; Heather Moyse	3:50.61	United States; Elana Meyers; Lauryn Williams	3:50.71	United States; Jamie Greubel; Aja Evans	3:51.61

^{a} Russian teams were originally awarded the gold medal, but were disqualified by the International Olympic Committee in November 2017 for doping violations.

== Qualification ==
A maximum of 170 quota spots were available to athletes to compete at the games. A maximum 130 men and 40 women might qualify. The qualification was based on the world rankings of 20 January 2014.

== Participating nations ==
169 athletes from 23 nations participated, with number of athletes in parentheses.

- Australia (8)
- Austria (6)
- Belgium (2)
- Brazil (6)
- Canada (16)
- Czech Republic (4)
- France (8)
- Germany (18)
- Great Britain (8)
- Italy (4)
- Jamaica (2)
- Japan (4)
- Latvia (8)
- Monaco (2)
- Netherlands (6)
- Poland (4)
- Romania (8)
- Russia (16)
- Serbia (2)
- Slovakia (4)
- South Korea (10)
- Switzerland (9)
- United States (16)
