= John Napier (bobsleigh) =

American bobsledder (born 1986)

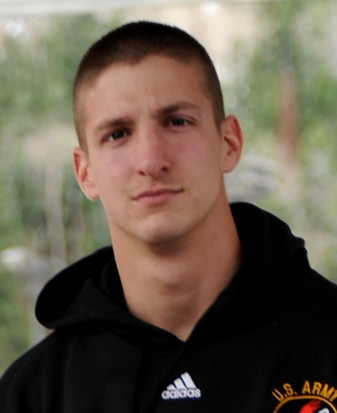
- Napier in 2010

Personal information
- Born: John Napier; December 12, 1986 (age 39)
- Education: Northeast College of Health Sciences
- Height: 6 ft 3 in (1.91 m)

Sport
- Sport: Bobsleigh
- Events: Two-man, Four-man
- Club: U.S. Army WCAP
- Coached by: William Tavares

John Napier (born December 12, 1986) is an American bobsled driver and a soldier in the U.S. Army World Class Athlete Program. He won the two-man event at the 2009 U.S. National Bobsled Championships with Cory Butner. At the 2009 FIBT World Championships, he placed 17th in the two-man event with T.J. Burns and 11th in the four-man event with Jesse Beckom, Jamie Moriarty, and Nick Cunningham.

At the 2009–10 Bobsleigh World Cup event in Lake Placid, New York, he won the two-man event with Charles Berkeley and the silver medal in the four-man event with Jamie Moriarty, Steven Langton, and Christopher Fogt

Napier began competing in 1994 and became a member of the U.S. national team in 2002. His parents were both bobsledders; his father, William Napier, was a former president of the U.S. Bobsled and Skeleton Federation. Napier enlisted in the Vermont Army National Guard in June 2007 and joined the World Class Athlete Program in May, 2008.

It was announced on January 17, 2010, that he made the US team in the two-man and four-man events for the 2010 Winter Olympics. He finished tenth in the two-man event while crashing out in the four-man event.

Shortly after competing in the Olympics John Napier spent 6 months in the Paktika Province of Afghanistan fighting with the US Army 3-172 Infantry battalion in 2010. Napier graduated from Northeast College of Health Sciences with a Bachelor's of Professional Studies and a Doctor of Chiropractic degree in 2019.
