= Justin Olsen =

American bobsledder (born 1987)

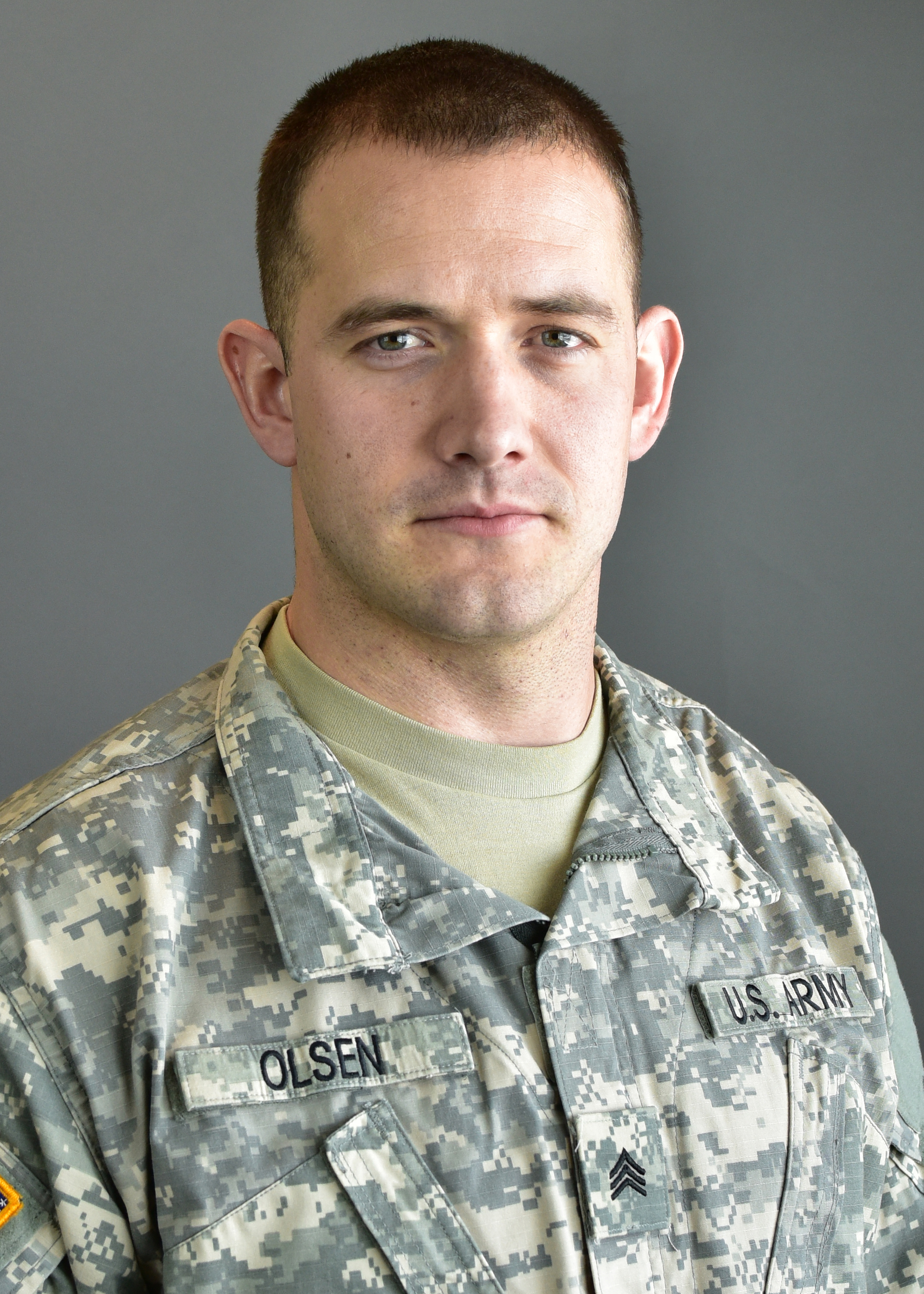
- Sgt Olsen in 2017

Personal information
- Born: April 16, 1987 (age 39) Lubbock, Texas, U.S.
- Height: 188 cm (6 ft 2 in)
- Weight: 107 kg (236 lb)

Sport
- Sport: Bobsleigh
- Club: U.S. Army WCAP
Medal record
Representing the United States
Olympic Games
Gold medal – first place	2010 Vancouver	Four-man
World Championships
Gold medal – first place	2009 Lake Placid	Four-man
Gold medal – first place	2012 Lake Placid	Four-man
Gold medal – first place	2012 Lake Placid	Mixed team
Bronze medal – third place	2009 Lake Placid	Mixed team
Bronze medal – third place	2013 St. Moritz	Four-man

Justin Bradley Olsen (born April 16, 1987) is an American bobsledder who has competed since 2008. He won two medals at the 2009 FIBT World Championships in Lake Placid, New York, with a gold in the four-man and a bronze in the mixed team events. Olsen's best event bobsleigh World Cup finish was second on three occasions in 2008–09. Olsen won a gold medal at the 2010 Vancouver Olympics in the four-man bobsled with driver Steve Holcomb.

He is a native of San Antonio, Texas, and a graduate of Sandra Day O'Connor High School.

Following a groin injury in June 2013 which left Olsen out of training for two months, he was later replaced on his original four-man bobsled team for the 2013–2014 season. His new team, composed of him, Nick Cunningham, Johnny Quinn, and Dallas Robinson, finished twelfth at the 2014 Winter Olympics.

== Personal life ==
=== Military ===
Justin is a soldier in the New York Army National Guard and a member of the U.S. Army World Class Athlete Program. He served at the Joint-Force Headquarters in New York.
