= Johnny Quinn =

American bobsledder and football player

No. 17
- Position: Wide receiver

Personal information
- Born: November 6, 1983 (age 43); Harrisburg, Pennsylvania, U.S.
- Listed height: 6 ft 0 in (1.83 m)
- Listed weight: 220 lb (100 kg)

Career information
- High school: McKinney (TX)
- College: North Texas
- NFL draft: 2007: undrafted

Career history
- Buffalo Bills (2007)*; Green Bay Packers (2008)*; Saskatchewan Roughriders (2009)
- * Offseason or practice squad member only

Awards and highlights
- 2× First-team All-Sun Belt (2004, 2006); Second-team All-Sun Belt (2005); 2014 U.S. Olympian, Sochi, Russia
- Stats at CFL.ca (archive)

Johnny Quinn (born November 6, 1983) is an American bobsledder and former gridiron football player. He is a member of the U.S. National Bobsled Team and competed in the 2014 Winter Olympics. Quinn is a former wide receiver for the Saskatchewan Roughriders of the Canadian Football League (CFL). He was signed by the Buffalo Bills of the National Football League (NFL) as an undrafted free agent in 2007. He was also a member of the NFL's Green Bay Packers in 2008. Quinn was a two-sport athlete at the University of North Texas, where he lettered in football and track and graduated with a degree in criminal justice.

== High school ==
Quinn attended McKinney High School in McKinney, Texas and was a student and a standout in football and track. In football, as a senior, he led the state of Texas in receptions (80), finished second in receiving touchdowns (15), and third in receiving yards (1,106). He was a Class 5A first-team All-District selection, a Class 5A second-team All-Metroplex selection, and was a Class 5A first-team All-State selection. In track, he was a three-year letterman and regional qualifier in the triple jump and 200 meter dash.

Quinn played in the Oil Bowl (Texas vs. Oklahoma) and scored a touchdown. Texas won 28–7. Quinn also played in the Coca-Cola All-Star (DFW) and scored the game-tying touchdown. East tied the West 14–14.

Quinn graduated from McKinney High School in 2002.

== College career ==
Quinn had one Division-I football scholarship offer coming out of high school to the University of North Texas. At North Texas, Quinn was part of three football Sun Belt Conference championships (2002, 2003, 2004), played in three bowl games (2002, 2003, 2004), was a two-year team captain (2005, 2006) and finished as the school's all-time leading receiver in receptions (187) and receiving yards (2,718). Quinn walked on to the track and field team and anchored the 4x100 relay to the third-fastest time in school history (39.92) and a trip to the NCAA Regional Track & Field Championship in Austin, Texas. He was a three time first-team All Sun Belt Conference wide receiver (2004, 2005, 2006) and a first-team All Sun Belt Conference punt returner (2004). Quinn was nominated to the pre-season Bilentnikoff Watch List (2006) and finished third in the country for consecutive games with a reception (47). He was invited to play in the 2007 North-South Classic All-Star game in Houston, Texas.

Quinn set numerous weight room marks at North Texas. He bench pressed 450 pounds, inclined pressed 405 pounds and power cleaned 380 pounds. He also set the fastest 40 yard dash for a wide receiver at 4.42 seconds. Quinn's track & field personal bests in the 100 meter dash and 200 meter dash were 10.62 seconds and 21.80 seconds, respectively.

Quinn graduated from the University of North Texas in 2006 with a degree in Criminal Justice.

In 2011, Johnny Quinn was inducted into the North Texas Hall of Fame as a first ballot candidate.

In 2013, Johnny Quinn was selected as one of two receivers to the UNT All-Century Team.

== Professional career ==
=== Saskatchewan Roughriders ===
Quinn was signed by the Saskatchewan Roughriders of the Canadian Football League on January 12, 2009.

Quinn was released from Roughriders on May 27, 2010 after sustaining an ACL injury.

=== U.S. National Bobsled Team ===
In 2010, Quinn was signed to the USA national bobsled team after his training video made its way to the team. Quinn had sent a film showcasing his speed and acceleration from the Michael Johnson Performance Center to Olympic bobsled athlete Chuck Berkeley, who passed it along to driver Cory Butner. Quinn's first time in a bobsled was at team trials in Lake Placid, NY during the 2010–2011 season, where the team finished third. He has competed in the America's Cup and World Championship sliding events.

In 2014, Quinn was named to the US Olympic bobsled team for the 2014 Winter Olympics in Sochi, Russia.
