= Franziska Fritz =

German bobsledder (born 1991)

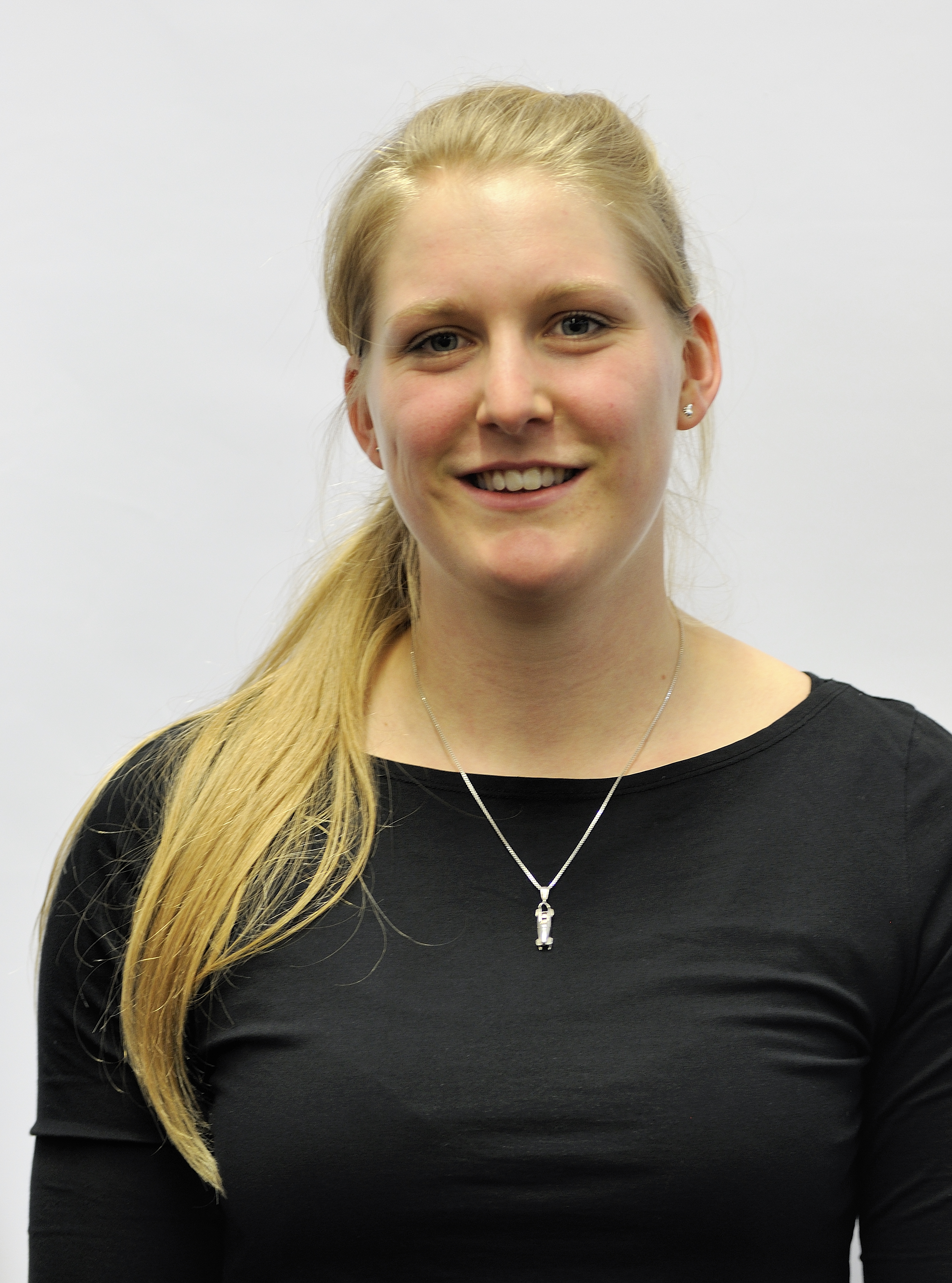

Personal information
- Nationality: German
- Born: 3 January 1991 (age 35) Hildburghausen, Germany
- Height: 1.82 m (6 ft 0 in)
- Weight: 81 kg (179 lb)

Sport
- Country: Germany
- Sport: Bobsleigh
Medal record
European Championships
Silver medal – second place	2014 Königgsee	Two-woman

Franziska Fritz (born 3 January 1991 in Hildburghausen) is a German bobsledder.

Fritz competed at the 2014 Winter Olympics for Germany. She teamed with driver Sandra Kiriasis as the Germany-1 sled in the two-woman event, finishing 5th.

As of April 2014, her best showing at the World Championships is 7th, in 2013.

Fritz made her World Cup debut in December 2013. As of April 2014, she has one World Cup victory, coming at Winterberg in 2013-14.

== World Cup podiums ==
Date	Location	Rank	Event	Teammates
5 January 2014	Winterberg	1st place, gold medalist(s)	Two-woman	Sandra Kiriasis
