= Tanja Mayer =

Swiss athlete and bobsledder (born 1993)

Personal information
- Nationality: Swiss
- Born: 2 July 1993 (age 32) Sommeri, TG, Switzerland
- Height: 1.80 m (5 ft 11 in)
- Weight: 73 kg (161 lb)

Sport
- Sport: Bobsleigh
- Event: two-women
- Coached by: (Switzerland) Marcel Rohner (Czech Republic) Petr Ramseidl
Medal record
Women's Bobsleigh
Representing Switzerland
European Championships
Gold medal – first place	2014 Königgsee	Two-Women

Tanja Mayer (born 2 July 1993) is a Swiss athlete and bobsledder. She competed in heptathlon at the junior level and started competing in bobsleigh in 2013.

== Bobsleigh ==
On 26 January 2014, Tanja Mayer, along with Swiss pilot Fabienne Meyer, won the two-women World Cup race in Königsee, Germany. The race also doubled as the European Championship, earning them a gold medal.

She is competing as a brakewoman at the 2014 Winter Olympics.

=== European Championships ===
- 2014 European Championships – (Germany) Königssee, (gold) with Fabienne Meyer

== Athletics ==
Tanja competed in heptathlon at the junior level. In 2009, she took part in the World Youth Championships where she finished in 7th place. In 2011, she finished in 9th place at the European Junior Championships. She also competed at the 2012 World Junior Championships in Barcelona where she finished in 16th place.
