= Jamie Moriarty =

American bobsledder

Personal information
- Born: March 26, 1981 (age 45)
- Height: 6 ft 2 in (1.88 m)

Sport
- Country: USA
- Sport: Bobsleigh
- Position: push athlete
- Event: 4-man

Achievements and titles
- Olympic finals: 13th

Jamie Moriarty (born March 26, 1981) is an American bobsledder who has competed since 2006. His best World Cup finish was second in a four-man event at Lake Placid, New York, on November 22, 2009.

== Biography ==
Moriarty graduated in 2003 from Cornell University with a degree in hotel and restaurant management. He played safety on the Cornell Big Red football team where he had 152 tackles and six interceptions over three seasons.

Moriarty made the US team in the four-man event for the 2010 Winter Olympics, where he finished 13th (with Bill Schuffenhauer, Nick Cunningham and Mike Kohn).

He co-founded with fellow Cornell alum and NHL player Douglas Murray the Uber Dispensing Company, which produces the UberTap, a hands-free three-sprout keg tap.

== Family ==
Moriarty has four family members who played in the National Football League: his father, Tom; his uncle, Pat; his uncle Frank; and his uncle Larry.
