= Dmitry Abramovitch =

Russian bobsledder

Personal information
- Nationality: Russian
- Born: October 30, 1982 (age 44)
- Years active: 2005–present

Sport
- Country: Russia
- Sport: Bobsleigh
- Events: Two-man, Four-man

Achievements and titles
- Olympic finals: 2010 Winter Olympics – 7th (two-man), 9th (four-man))

Dmitry Vladimirovich Abramovitch (Russian: Дмитрий Владимирович Абрамович; born 30 October 1982) is a Russian bobsledder who has competed since 2005. His best Bobsleigh World Cup finish was tied for second in a four-man event at Park City, Utah on 14 November 2009.

Abramovitch's best finish at the FIBT World Championships was eighth in the two-man event at St. Moritz in 2007.

He finished seventh in the two-man event and tied for ninth in the four-man event at the 2010 Winter Olympics in Vancouver.
