= Roman Handschin =

Swiss bobsledder (born 1982)

Roman Handschin (born 1 August 1982) is a Swiss bobsledder who has competed since 2004. He finished eighth in the four-man event at the 2006 Winter Olympics in Turin.
