= Michelle Rzepka =

American bobsledder (born 1983)

Michelle "Mickie" Rzepka (born August 4, 1983) is an American bobsledder who has competed since 2007. Her best event finish in the Bobsleigh World Cup is third at Whistler, Canada on February 6, 2009, where she set the start record with teammate Erin Pac.

Rzepka was born in Novi, Michigan and graduated from Novi High School in 2001. She graduated from Michigan State University in 2005 with a degree in kinesiology; she later earned a master's degree in exercise physiology from McNeese State University.

It was announced on January 16, 2010, that she made the US team for the 2010 Winter Olympics, where she finished sixth in the two-woman event.

In 2010, her family competed on Family Feud against the Crisona family during Steve Harvey's first season, but was defeated. The episode aired as the 2nd one on October 26, 2010.
