= Lyndon Rush =

Canadian bobsledder (born 1980)

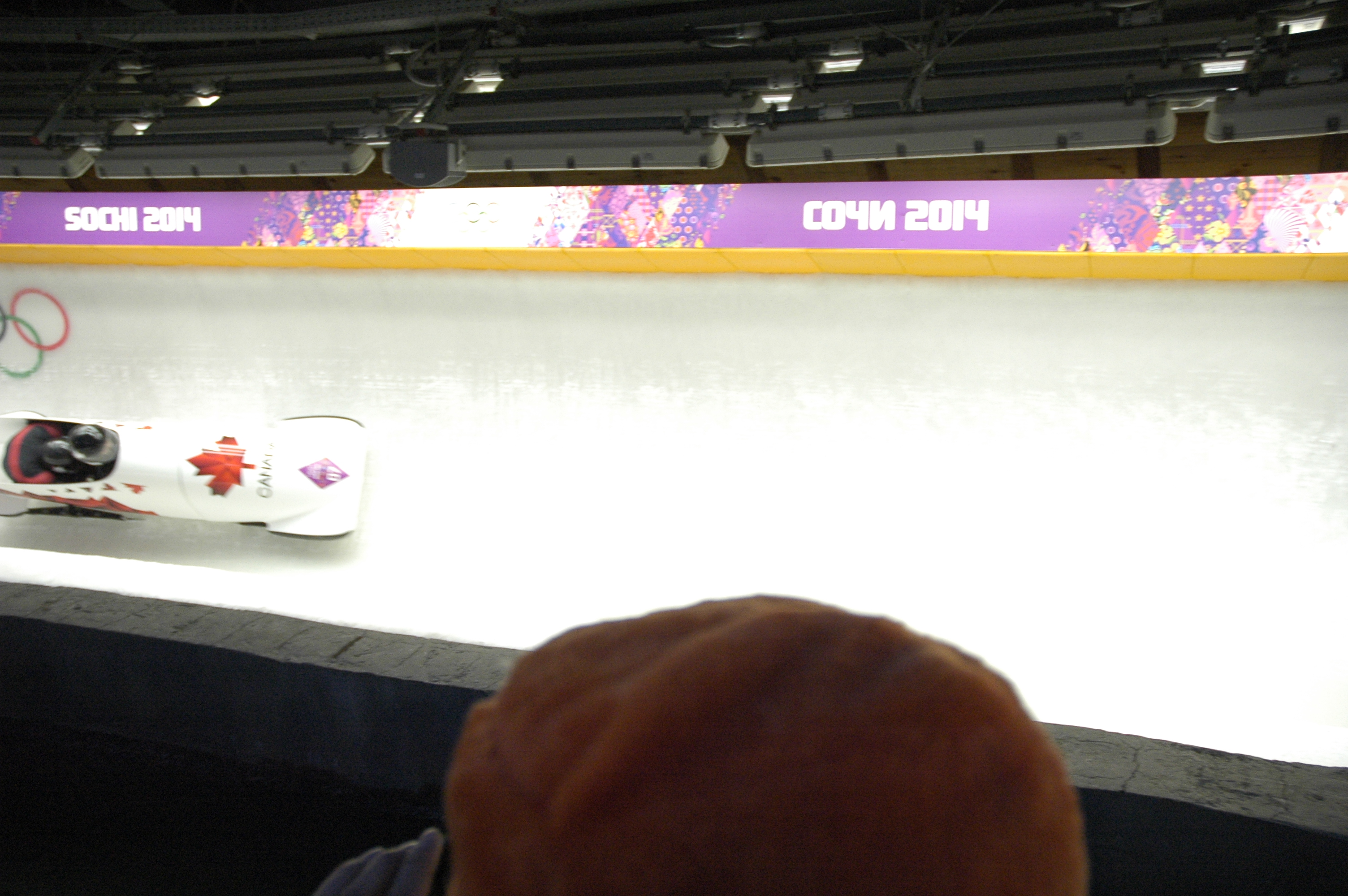
- Rush at the 2014 Winter Olympics

Personal information
- Full name: Lyndon Rush
- Nationality: Canadian
- Born: November 24, 1980 (age 45) Humboldt, Saskatchewan
- Height: 1.83 m (6 ft 0 in)
- Weight: 103 kg (227 lb)

Sport
- Country: Canada
- Sport: Bobsleigh
Medal record
Bobsleigh
Representing Canada
Olympic Games
Bronze medal – third place	2010 Vancouver	Four-man
World Championships
Silver medal – second place	2008 Altenberg	Mixed team
Silver medal – second place	2012 Lake Placid	Two man
Bronze medal – third place	2011 Königssee	Mixed team
Bronze medal – third place	2013 St. Moritz	Mixed team

Lyndon Rush (born November 24, 1980) is a Canadian retired bobsledder who has competed since 2004. Rush took up bobsleigh after spending five years playing Canadian football for the University of Saskatchewan. He initially trained as a brakeman before switching to driving due to a hamstring injury.

Rush won a bronze medal in the four-man event at the 2010 Winter Olympics in Vancouver, British Columbia, Canada. He won the silver medal in the mixed bobsleigh-skeleton team event at the 2008 FIBT World Championships in Altenberg, Germany.

Born in Humboldt, Saskatchewan, Rush made his first breakthroughs in bobsleigh during the 2009–10 Bobsleigh World Cup winning the opening four-man event in Park City, Utah. Rush also finished third at the four-man event in Cesana, Italy, all of which contributed to his current ranking of third in the four-man event. Rush, together with Lascelles Brown, tied for the victory with André Lange at the two-man event in St-Moritz; this was their first victory and podium in the two-man.

After his runs in both two-man and four-man bobsleigh at the 2010 Winter Olympics, Rush openly mused about retiring. Rush is a deeply religious and devoted family man and following the four-man bobsleigh run in Whistler in which he lost out on silver by 1/100 of a second, Rush said that "It makes me feel like I don't want to retire. I like racing bobsled. It's fun. But I think I might have to move on. I'm 29 years old. I'm not a kid. I can't go touring all over Europe all the time."

He became partners with Jesse Lumsden at the beginning of the 2012 season and the duo won their first World Cup Gold medal together in the two-man event on February 3, 2012. It was Rush's second victory in two-man event and his eighth medal in his career on the World Cup circuit. Rush then built on his successes with Lumsden to win a silver medal at the 2012 World Championships. There, despite battling through a stomach virus on his last two runs, as he was in second through the first two runs; he was eventually overtaken by Steven Holcomb pushing him to the silver by 1/100 of a second. In 2013 the duo of Rush and Lumsden won the overall World Cup two-man bobsleigh title.

Rush retired from the sport after the 2014 Winter Olympics in Sochi. Since retiring he has taken up a role as assistant coach of WinSport Academy's bobsleigh programme, training developing bobsledders.

Rush married Krysta in 2003, and the couple have three daughters and a son. Rush resides in Sylvan Lake, Alberta where he works as a real estate agent.
