= Steven Langton =

American bobsledder

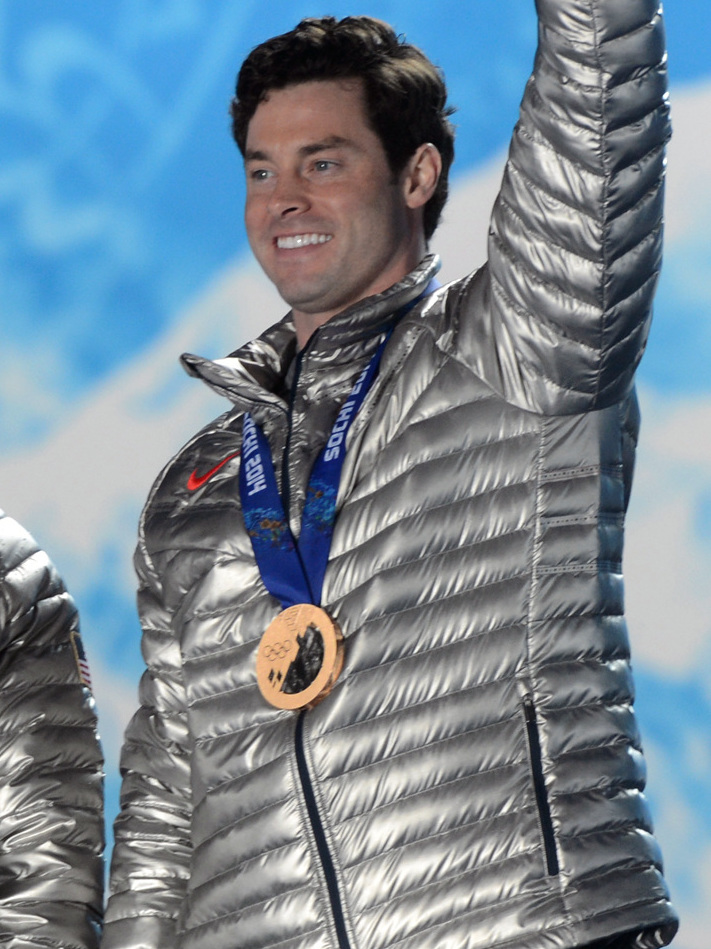
- Steven Langton at the 2014 Olympics

Personal information
- Born: April 15, 1983 (age 43) Malden, Massachusetts, United States
- Height: 6 ft 2 in (188 cm)
- Weight: 242 lb (110 kg)

Sport
- Sport: Bobsleigh
- Club: Northeastern
Medal record
Representing the United States
Olympic Games
| Silver medal – second place | 2014 Sochi | Two-man |
| Silver medal – second place | 2014 Sochi | Four-man |
World Championships
| Gold medal – first place | 2012 Lake Placid | Two-man |
| Gold medal – first place | 2012 Lake Placid | Four-man |
| Bronze medal – third place | 2011 Königssee | Four-man |
| Bronze medal – third place | 2013 St. Moritz | Four-man |

Steven Daniel Langton (born April 15, 1983) is an American bobsledder. He won silver medals in both the two-man and four-man events at the 2014 Winter Olympics, and gold in both the two-man and four-man events at the 2012 FIBT World Championships.

== Early life ==
Langton attended Northeastern University, in Boston, Massachusetts, graduating cum laude in 2006 with a degree in Business Management and Entrepreneurship. At Northeastern, he was a member of the track and field team and was a two-year team captain, with personal bests of 6.49 seconds in the indoor 55m dash, 10.58 seconds in the outdoor 100m dash, and 7.04m in the long jump. He was inspired to try bobsled after watching the 2006 Winter Olympics.

== Olympic career ==
At the 2010 Olympic Games, Langton competed in both the two-man and four-man events with pilot, John Napier. Langton finished tenth in the two-man event. Due to injuries that were sustained during USA 2's crash in the second run of the four-man event, Langton and his team did compete on the second day.

At the 2014 Olympic Games, Langton competed in both the two-man and four-man events with pilot Steven Holcomb. He won a bronze medal (later upgraded to silver) in the two-man event at the Sochi Winter Olympic Games, marking the first time in 62 years an American sled had won an Olympic medal in the two-man event. Following this accomplishment, Langton teamed with Steven Holcomb, Curt Tomasevicz and Christopher Fogt to win a bronze medal (later also upgraded to silver) in the four-man event. With this medal, they became the first American team in 62 years to win an Olympic medal in both the two- and four-man events at the same Olympics.

== World Championships and World Cups ==
Outside of the Olympic Games, Langton has also won four world championships medals: bronze in the four-man in 2011 and 2013, and gold in both events in 2012. The 2012 victory marked the first time an American sled won gold in the two-man event at a world championships, and the first time the American team won both events at a single world championships.

He has also won 21 World Cup medals during his career: 11 gold, 7 silver and 3 bronze. During the 2010–11 season Langton also won the Inaugural World Push Championships held in Cesana Pariol, Italy.

== Family ==
Steven Langton's brother, Christopher Langton, was an All-Ivy lacrosse player at Cornell University. Chris served as Team USA's Alternate for the Sochi Winter Olympic Games. Another brother, Sean Langton, currently works as a dentist.
