= Cory Butner =

American bobsledder (born 1981)

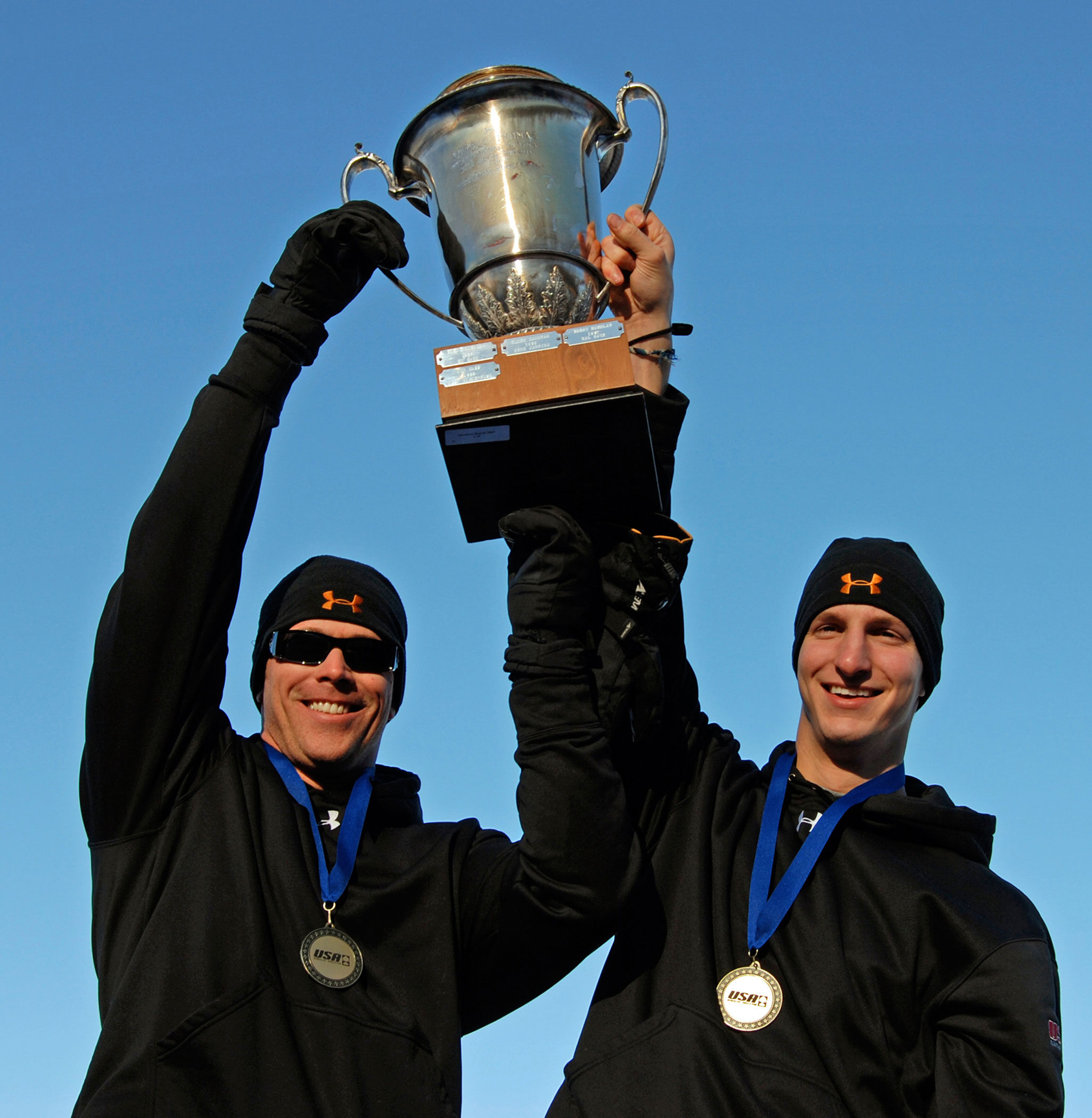
- Butner (left) and John Napier in 2009

Personal information
- Full name: Cory James Butner
- Born: March 27, 1981 (age 45) Riverside, California, U.S.
- Height: 6 ft 2 in (188 cm)
- Weight: 225 lb (102 kg)

Sport
- Sport: Bobsleding

Cory James Butner (born March 27, 1981, in California) is an American bobsledder who was on silver-medalist teams during the 2012–13 Bobsleigh World Cup. He is expected to compete, with Justin Olsen, in Bobsleigh at the 2014 Winter Olympics – Two-man. He lives in Yucaipa California.
