= Alexey Kireev =

Russian bobsledder

Alexey Kireev (born 13 November 1985) is a Russian bobsledder who has competed since 2007. His best World Cup finish was third in a four-man event at Altenberg, Germany in December 2009.

Kireev finished eighth in the four-man event at the 2010 Winter Olympics in Vancouver.
