= Jannis Bäcker =

German bobsledder (born 1985)

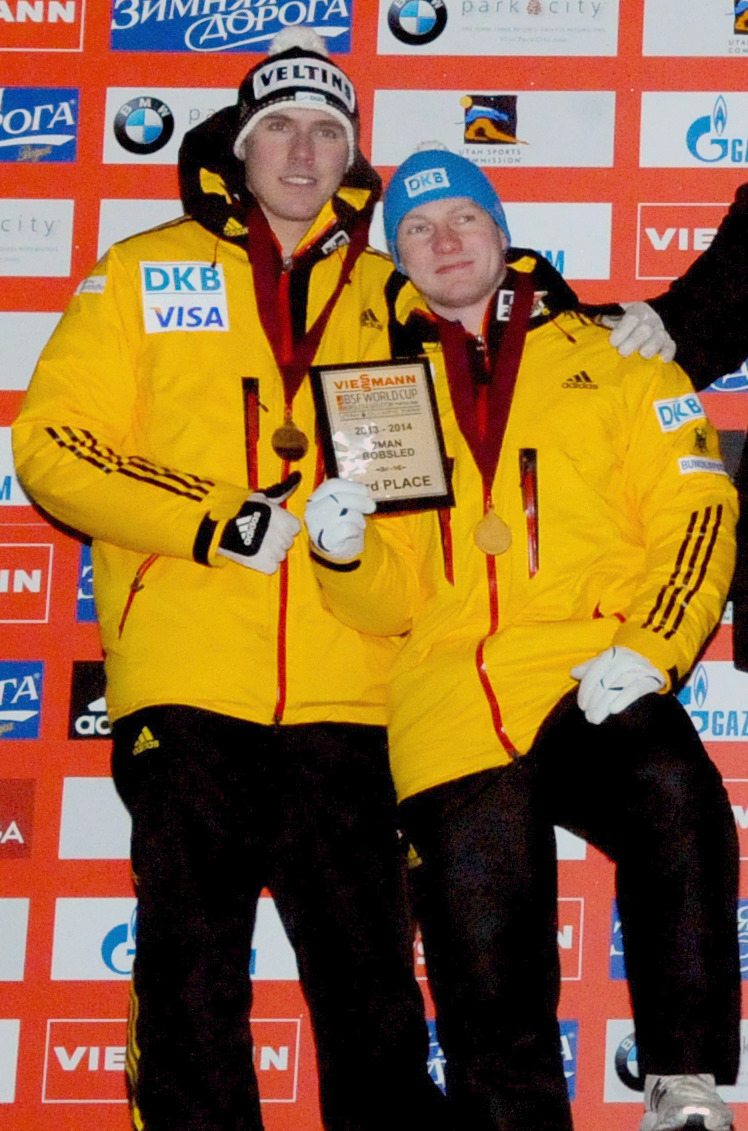
- Bäcker (left) and Francesco Friedrich in 2013

Personal information
- Born: 1 January 1985 (age 41) Unna, Nordrhein-Westfalen, West Germany
- Height: 1.98 m (6 ft 6 in)
- Weight: 110 kg (243 lb)

Sport
- Country: Germany
- Sport: Bobsleigh
- Club: BSC Winterberg
- Turned pro: 2008
Medal record
Representing Germany
World Championships
Gold medal – first place	2013 St. Moritz	Two-man
Bronze medal – third place	2016 Igls	Mixed team

Jannis Bäcker (born 1 January 1985) is a German bobsledder who won a world title in the doubles in 2013, together with Francesco Friedrich. He competed at the 2014 Winter Olympics in the doubles and fours and finished in eighth and tenth place, respectively.
