= Martin Putze =

German bobsledder (born 1985)

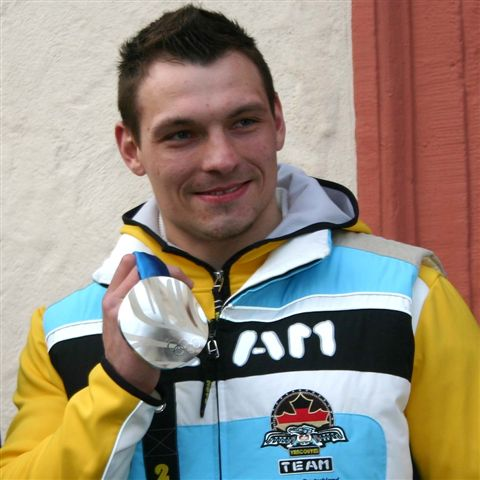
- Putze showing his 2010 silver medal

Personal information
- Nationality: German
- Born: 14 January 1985 (age 41) Apolda, Thuringia, East Germany
- Height: 1.81 m (5 ft 11 in)
- Weight: 100 kg (220 lb)

Sport
- Country: Germany
- Sport: Bobsleigh
- Event: 4-man
- Club: BSR "Rennsteig" Oberhof

Achievements and titles
- Olympic finals: 1st place, gold medalist(s) 2nd place, silver medalist(s)
Medal record
Men´s Bobsleigh
Representing Germany
Olympic Games
Gold medal – first place	2006 Turin	Four-man
Silver medal – second place	2010 Vancouver	Four-man
World Championships
Gold medal – first place	2005 Calgary	Four-man
Gold medal – first place	2008 Altenberg	Four-man
Gold medal – first place	2013 St. Moritz	Four-man
Silver medal – second place	2009 Lake Placid	Four-man
Silver medal – second place	2012 Lake Placid	Four-man
Bronze medal – third place	2007 St. Moritz	Four-man

Martin Putze (born 14 January 1985 in Apolda, Thuringia) is a German bobsledder who has competed since the early 2000s. Competing in two Winter Olympics, he won two medals in the four-man event with a gold in 2006 and a silver in 2010.

Putze also won four medals in the four-man event at the FIBT World Championships with two golds (2005, 2008), one silver (2009) and one bronze (2007).
