= Steven Holcomb =

American bobsledder (1980–2017)

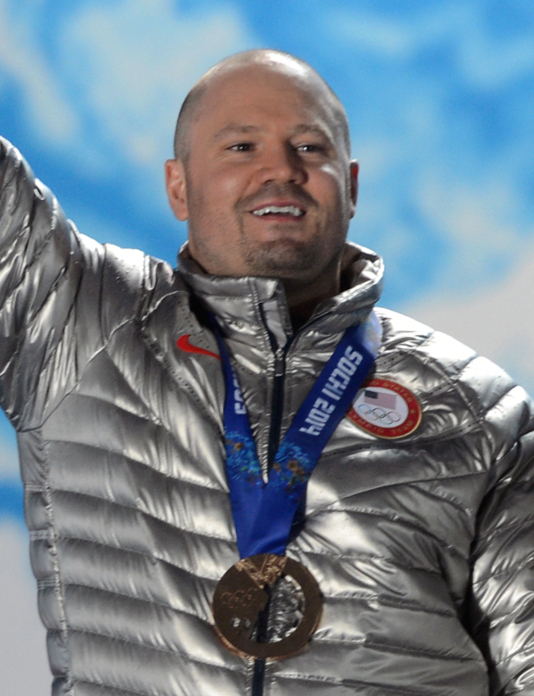
- Holcomb at the 2014 Winter Olympics (note: the bronze in image was later upgraded to silver)

Personal information
- Full name: Steven Paul Holcomb
- Nicknames: Holky, Holcomb, Steve
- Born: April 14, 1980 Park City, Utah, U.S.
- Died: May 6, 2017 (aged 37) Lake Placid, New York, U.S.
- Height: 5 ft 10 in (178 cm)

Sport
- Country: United States
- Sport: Bobsleigh
- Team: U.S. National Team
- Turned pro: 1998
- Coached by: Brian Shimer

Achievements and titles
- Olympic finals: 2006 – 6th place 4-man 2006 – 14th 2-man 2010 – Gold Medal 4-man 2010 – 6th place 2-man 2014 – Silver Medal 4-man 2014 – Silver Medal 2-man
- World finals: 2009 FIBT World Champion 4-Man; 2012 FIBT World Champion 4-Man; 2012 FIBT World Champion 2-Man; 2012 FIBT World Champion Team Event
Medal record
Men's bobsleigh
Representing the United States
Olympic Games
Gold medal – first place	2010 Vancouver	Four-man
Silver medal – second place	2014 Sochi	Two-man
Silver medal – second place	2014 Sochi	Four-man
World Championships
Gold medal – first place	2009 Lake Placid	Four-man
Gold medal – first place	2012 Lake Placid	Four-man
Gold medal – first place	2012 Lake Placid	Two-man
Gold medal – first place	2012 Lake Placid	Mixed team
Gold medal – first place	2013 St. Moritz	Mixed team
Bronze medal – third place	2008 Altenberg	Mixed team
Bronze medal – third place	2009 Lake Placid	Two-man
Bronze medal – third place	2009 Lake Placid	Mixed team
Bronze medal – third place	2011 Königssee	Four-man
Bronze medal – third place	2013 St. Moritz	Four-man
World Cup Championships
Gold medal – first place	2006–2007	Combined
Gold medal – first place	2006–2007	Two-man
Gold medal – first place	2009–2010	Combined
Gold medal – first place	2009–2010	Four-man
Gold medal – first place	2013–2014	Combined
Gold medal – first place	2013–2014	Two-man
Silver medal – second place	2006–2007	Four-man
Silver medal – second place	2010–2011	Four-man
Silver medal – second place	2013–2014	Four-man
Silver medal – second place	2016–2017	Two-man
Bronze medal – third place	2007–2008	Combined
Bronze medal – third place	2010–2011	Combined
Bronze medal – third place	2016–2017	Combined
Bronze medal – third place	2016–2017	Four-man
World Cup Single Events
Gold medal – first place	2006–07 Cesana Pariol	USA 1 Four Man
Gold medal – first place	2006–07 Cesana Pariol	USA 1 Two Man
Gold medal – first place	2006–07 Igls	USA 1 Four Man
Gold medal – first place	2006–07 Cortina	USA 1 Two Man
Gold medal – first place	2006–07 Cortina	USA 1 Four Man
Gold medal – first place	2007–08 Park City	USA 1 Four Man
Gold medal – first place	2007–08 Park City	USA 1 Two Man
Gold medal – first place	2007–08 Calgary	USA 1 Four Man
Gold medal – first place	2008–09 Park City	USA 1 Four Man
Gold medal – first place	2008–09 Park City (make-up race)	USA 1 Four Man
Gold medal – first place	2009–10 Lake Placid	USA 1 Four Man
Gold medal – first place	2009–10 Winterberg	USA 1 Four Man
Gold medal – first place	2009–10 Cesana	USA 1 Four Man
Gold medal – first place	2010–11 Lake Placid	USA 1 Four Man
Gold medal – first place	2010–11 Whistler	USA 1 Four Man
Gold medal – first place	2012–13 Lake Placid	USA 1 Two Man
Gold medal – first place	2012–13 Park City	USA 1 Two Man
Gold medal – first place	2012–13 Whistler	USA 1 Two Man
Gold medal – first place	2013–14 Calgary	USA 1 Four Man
Gold medal – first place	2013–14 Calgary	USA 1 Two Man
Gold medal – first place	2013–14 Park City	USA 1 Four Man
Gold medal – first place	2013–14 Park City	USA 1 Two Man
Gold medal – first place	2013–14 Lake Placid	USA 1 Four Man
Gold medal – first place	2013–14 Lake Placid 1	USA 1 Two Man
Gold medal – first place	2013–14 Lake Placid 2	USA 1 Two Man
Gold medal – first place	2013–14 Igls	USA 1 Two Man
Gold medal – first place	2013–14 Königssee	USA 1 Four Man
Gold medal – first place	2015–16 Lake Placid	USA 1 Two Man
Gold medal – first place	2016–17 Lake Placid	USA 1 Two Man
Silver medal – second place	2006–07 Lake Placid	USA 1 Two Man
Silver medal – second place	2006–07 Park City	USA 1 Two Man
Silver medal – second place	2006–07 Calgary	USA 1 Two Man
Silver medal – second place	2006–07 Königssee	USA 1 Four Man
Silver medal – second place	2006–07 Winterberg	USA 1 Four Man
Silver medal – second place	2007–08 Calgary	USA 1 Two Man
Silver medal – second place	2007–08 Konigssee	USA 1 Four Man
Silver medal – second place	2007–08 Lake Placid	USA 1 Four Man
Silver medal – second place	2008–09 Altenberg	USA 1 Two Man
Silver medal – second place	2008–09 Vancouver	USA 1 Four Man
Silver medal – second place	2008–09 Igls	USA 1 Four Man
Silver medal – second place	2009–10 Lake Placid	USA 1 Two Man
Silver medal – second place	2009–10 Königssee	USA 1 Team Event
Silver medal – second place	2009–10 Königssee	USA 1 Four Man
Silver medal – second place	2009–10 Altenberg	USA 1 Four Man
Silver medal – second place	2011–12 La Plagne	USA 1 Two Man
Silver medal – second place	2011–12 Igls	USA 1 Four Man
Silver medal – second place	2012–13 Park City	USA 1 Four Man
Silver medal – second place	2012–13 Lake Placid	USA 1 Four Man
Silver medal – second place	2013–14 Igls	USA 1 Four Man
Silver medal – second place	2015–16 St. Moritz	USA 1 Two Man
Silver medal – second place	2016–17 Lake Placid	USA 1 Four Man
Silver medal – second place	2016–17 Konigssee	USA 1 Two Man
Bronze medal – third place	2007–08 Lake Placid	USA 1 Two Man
Bronze medal – third place	2008–09 Igls	USA 1 Two Man
Bronze medal – third place	2008–09 Winterberg	USA 1 Four Man
Bronze medal – third place	2009–10 Cesana	USA 1 Two Man
Bronze medal – third place	2010–11 Igls	USA 1 Four Man
Bronze medal – third place	2011–12 Igls	USA 1 Two Man
Bronze medal – third place	2012–13 La Plagne	USA 1 Two Man
Bronze medal – third place	2016–17 St. Moritz	USA 1 Two Man
Bronze medal – third place	2016–17 Innsbruck	USA 1 Four Man

Steven Paul Holcomb (April 14, 1980 – May 6, 2017) was an American bobsledder who competed from 1998 until his death in 2017. At the 2010 Winter Olympics in Vancouver, he won the four-man bobsled event for the United States, its first gold medal in that event since 1948. At the 2014 Winter Olympics in Sochi, he finished second in both the four-man and two-man event.

== Early career ==
Holcomb learned to ski when he was 2 years old. He was born in Park City, Utah, where his mother would take him skiing at every opportunity. He began ski racing when he was six at the main resort of Park City, and began ski racing for the Park City Ski Team for the following twelve years. During this time he was also an athlete in local sports, playing soccer, football, basketball, baseball, and running track. In 1998 he participated in a local USA bobsled team try-out and scored enough points to be invited to the National Team Camp, which included the National Push Championships. He finished in eighth place and was invited to stay for an additional week to train with the National Team. Despite his eighth-place finish, which qualified him for the national team, he was not selected because of his small stature and young age.

After placing 5th at the National Team Trials in early October 1998 at the Utah Olympic Park, he chose to attend the University of Utah. Shortly following the naming of the American 1998 IBSF Bobsleigh World Cup team, an injury caused the withdrawal of one member. On November 3, 1998, he was asked to join the World Cup team in Calgary, Alberta, for the first World Cup race, where he pushed for driver Brian Shimer. He then went on to have an above average career as a pusher for drivers Jim Herberich, Mike Dionne, Todd Hays, and Brian Shimer. Shortly before the 2002 Winter Olympics, Holcomb was cut from Brian Shimer's team, and replaced with Dan Steele, a veteran from the 1998 Winter Olympics. At the Utah Olympic Park for the 2002 Winter Olympics, he served as a bobsled forerunner, who tests the bobsled course prior to competition.

Starting with the 2004–2005 season, he achieved second and third ranked American driver. Holcomb left the military with an honorable discharge in June 2006, and focused on competition on the World Cup circuit. This led to immediate results in the 2006–07 season, where Holcomb (with team members Jovanovic and Kreitzburg) won the two-man World Cup Championship, while he finished second in the four-man competition (with Jovanovic, Kreitzburg, and Mesler), which earned Holcomb the overall Combined Championship.

As Holcomb rose through the ranks of American bobsledders, the degenerative eye disease Keratoconus, initially diagnosed in 2002, began to affect his daily life and competitive skills, which led to depression. In 2007, a non-invasive surgical procedure, corneal collagen cross-linking (C3-R), was performed to stabilize the disease, and in 2008 implantable corrective lenses were inserted, providing a measure of correction during the 2007–08 Bobsleigh World Cup season; he led his teams to three gold, three silver, and one bronze medals over that season. After Holcomb won gold at the 2010 Winter Olympics in Vancouver, Brian Boxer Wachler renamed the procedure C3-R to Holcomb C3-R, marking the first time a medical procedure was named after an Olympic athlete.

== Career ==
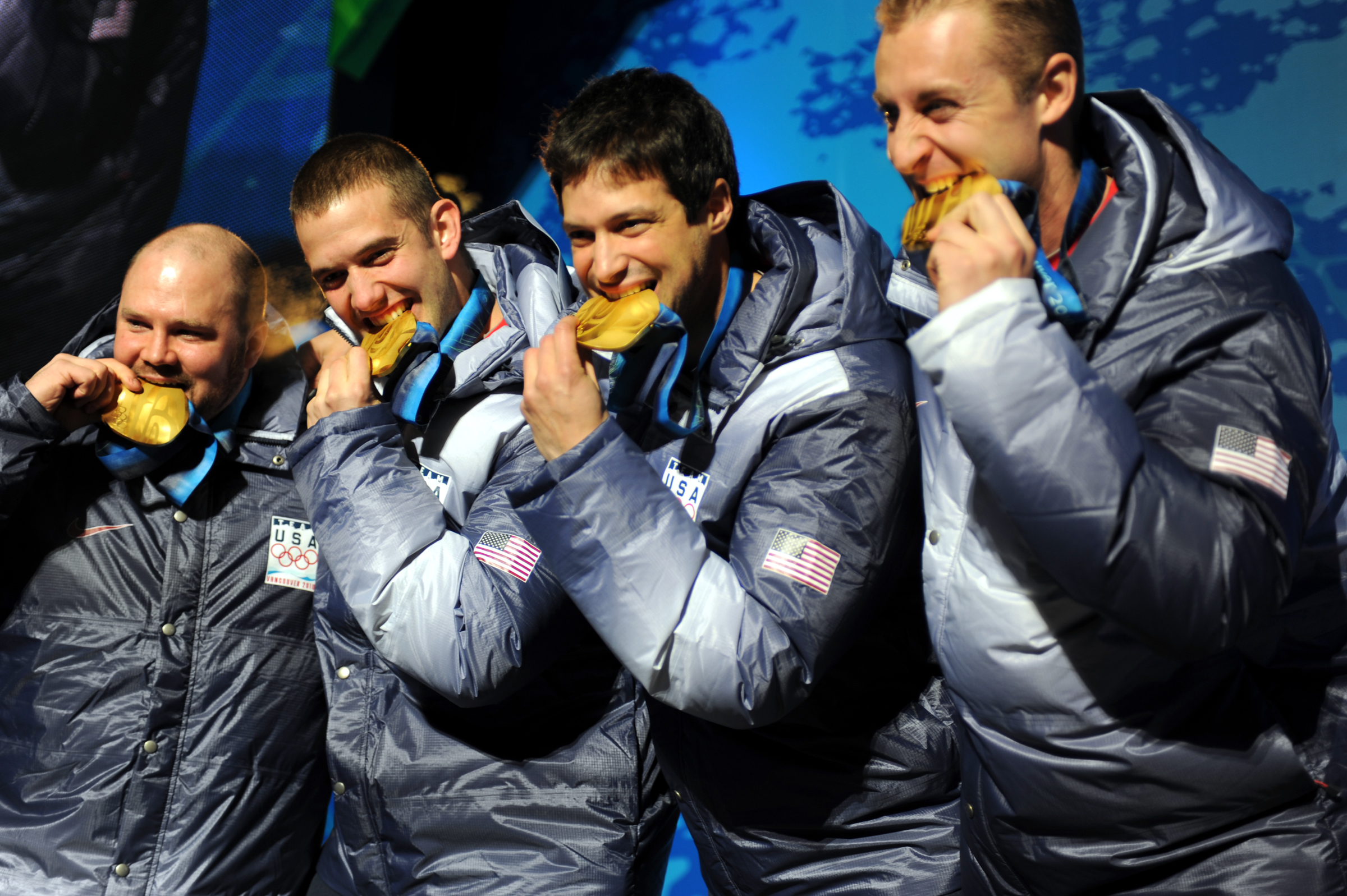
The crew of the four-man USA-1 at the 2010 Winter Olympics with their gold medals. From left to right: Holcomb, Justin Olsen, Steve Mesler, and Curtis Tomasevicz.

Over the course of his career, Holcomb piloted his two-man ("Night Hawk") and four-man ("Night Train") US teams to a total of 12 gold medals, 6 silver medals and 9 bronze medals across Bobsleigh at the Winter Olympics, IBSF World Championships and season-long IBSF Bobsleigh World Cup final standings. His results in individual Bobsleigh World Cup races, contributing to each season's final standings, include 29 gold, 23 silver and 9 bronze medals. As of the completion of his final (2016–17) season of all international competitions – and still true as of the completion of the 2021–22 sliding season – Steven Holcomb is the winningest American bobsled athlete in history.

Included in his success was the first US Four-man Olympic Championship title in 62 years, and the first US Four-man World Championship title in 50 years.

=== Olympics ===
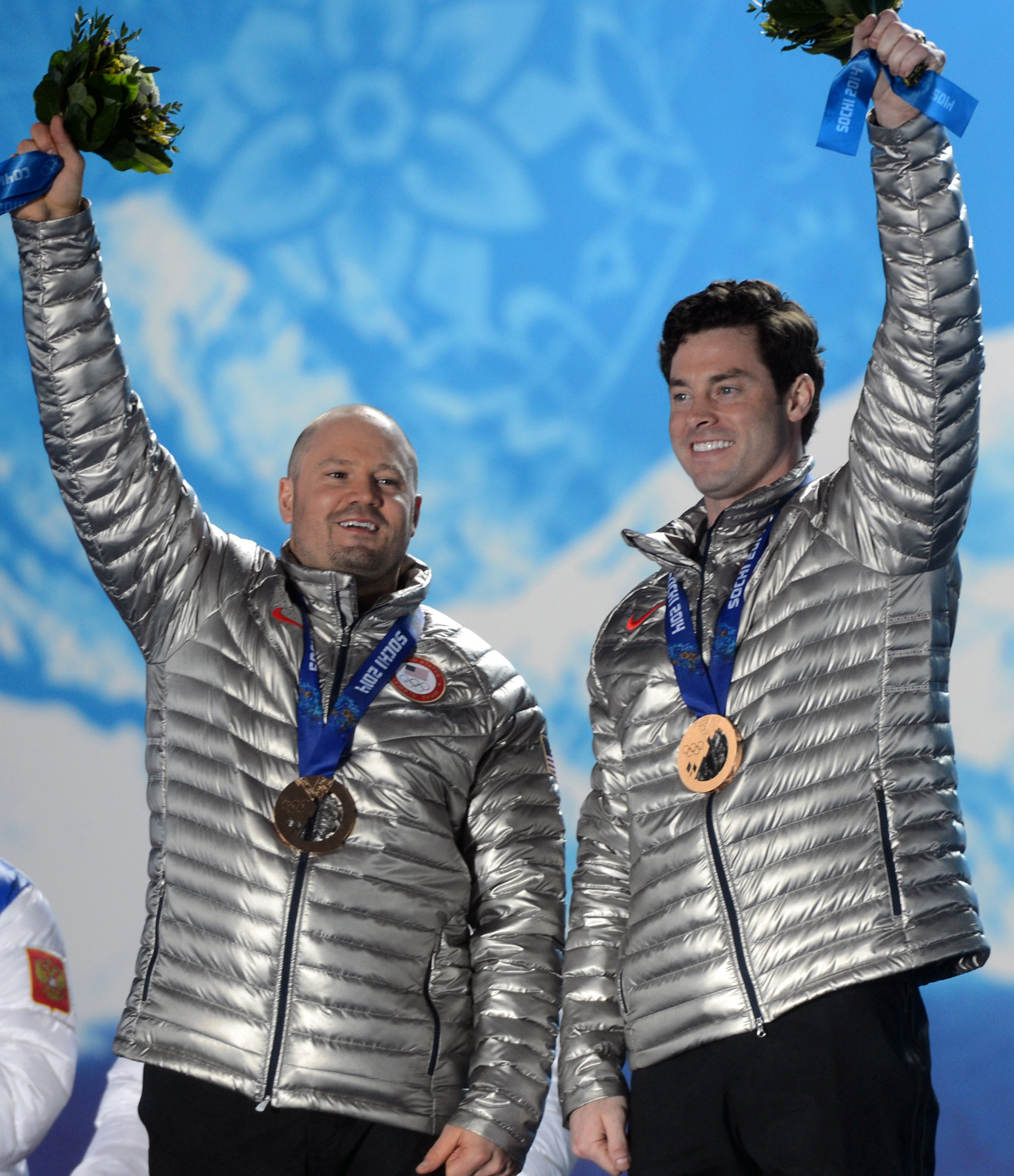
Steven Holcomb and Steve Langton, on 2014 Sochi Olympics podium with two-man bobsleigh bronze medals – later upgraded to silver.

It was announced on 17 January 2010 that Holcomb made the United States team in both the two-man and four-man events for the 2010 Winter Olympics. On February 17, Holcomb led the four-man US bobsled team to a gold-medal victory, ending a 62-year gold medal drought in United States Olympic four-man bobsled competition.

Holcomb qualified for the 2014 Winter Olympics in Sochi, in both the two-man and four-man bobsled. On February 16, Holcomb and brakeman Steve Langton won the bronze medal in the two-man competition, ending yet another 62-year medal drought in US Olympic two-man competition. These medals were upgraded to Silver Medals on March 27, 2019, when the IOC vacated the golds that Russian pilot Alexander Zubkov won in both the two- and four-man events due to doping. That means Holcomb, who crossed the line third in both of those races, now is a two-time silver winner in addition to the four-man gold he won at Vancouver in 2010.

=== World Championships, World Cup ===
At season-ending IBSF World Championships, Holcomb won four medals: a gold (2009 Four-man) and three bronzes (2008 Mixed team, 2009 Two-man, 2009 Mixed team).

Holcomb's successes at races during season-long IBSF Bobsleigh World Cup tournaments have resulted in numerous World Cup season titles. For the 2006–07 Bobsleigh World Cup, Holcomb won the overall 2006–07 Two-man, and 2006–07 Combined World Cup titles; the Combined title combines the results from both two-man and four-man competition, with Holcomb's second place in the 2006–07 Four-man standings contributing to his title win in the Combined standings. The 2006–07 result also made him the first American man to win the Two-man World Cup title. With strong performances throughout the 2009–10 Bobsleigh World Cup and 2013–14 Bobsleigh World Cup seasons, Holcomb won the 2009–10 Combined (his second), 2009–10 Four-man (his first), 2013–14 Combined (his third) and 2013–14 Two-man (his second) World Cup season titles.

After his success on the 2013–14 World Cup circuit and at the 2014 Olympics, Holcomb fell back in the results for the World Cup and World Championship competitions of the 2014–15 and 2015–16 seasons. He roared back in the 2016–17 Bobsleigh World Cup season, which ended on 19 March 2017, just seven weeks before Holcomb's death. During that season, Holcomb piloted his sleds to second place in the year-end 2016–17 Two-man, and third place in the year-end 2016–17 Four-man and 2016–17 Overall Combined World Cup standings.

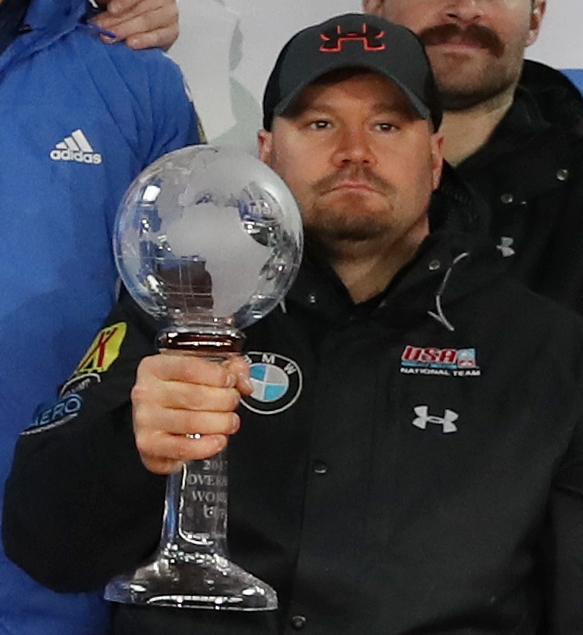
Holcomb receiving one of his three crystal trophies from his podium finishes in all three final standings (two-man, four-man, overall Combined) of the 2016–17 Bobsleigh World Cup season. (19 March 2017)

== Military service ==
Holcomb served as a soldier in the Utah Army National Guard for seven years, from March 1999 until July 2006. During his Army National Guard service, he served as a combat engineer in the 1457th Engineering Battalion. He took part in the U.S. Army World Class Athlete Program (WCAP) for seven years. At the end of 2006, he received an Honorable Discharge from service. While in the National Guard, he earned an Army Achievement Medal, Army Commendation Medal, Good Conduct Medal, Army Presidential Unit Citation, Army Superior Unit Award and Army Service Ribbon.

== Education ==
Holcomb attended The Winter Sports School in Park City, graduating in 1997.

== Boy Scouts ==
As a youth, Holcomb attained the rank of Eagle Scout in the Boy Scouts of America.

== Death ==
Holcomb was found dead in room 202 at the US Olympic Training Center in Lake Placid, New York, on May 6, 2017. He was 37. The initial autopsy cited fluid in Holcomb's lungs as a significant factor, while a subsequent toxicology report indicated that Holcomb had a blood-alcohol level of 0.188, along with a level of the sleeping aid Lunesta.

Holcomb had been found in his room by Katie Uhlaender, his close friend and US Olympic skeleton athlete. Holcomb and Uhlaender were featured in The Weight of Gold (2020), an HBO Sports Documentary which "explor(es) the mental health challenges that Olympic athletes often face."
