= Fabienne Meyer =

Swiss bobsledder (born 1981)

Personal information
- Nationality: Swiss
- Born: 28 November 1981 (age 44) Langenthal, BE, Switzerland
- Height: 1.67 m (5 ft 6 in)
- Weight: 73 kg (161 lb)

Sport
- Sport: Bobsleigh
- Event: two-women
- Coached by: (Switzerland) Marcel Rohner (Czech Republic) Petr Ramseidl
Medal record
Women's bobsleigh
Representing Switzerland
European Championships
Gold medal – first place	2014 Königgsee	Two-woman
Bronze medal – third place	2012 Altenberg	Two-woman

Fabienne Meyer (born 28 November 1981) is a Swiss former bobsledder who competed from 2005 to 2014.

She scored her first World Cup win in a two-woman event at Königssee, Germany, in January 2014. The race also doubled as the women's Bobsleigh European Championship, earning Meyer a gold medal alongside brakewoman Tanja Mayer. Meyer had previously won a bronze medal at the European Championship in 2012.

Meyer won the World Junior Championships in Bobsleigh in February 2008.

Meyer's best finish at the FIBT World Championships was 6th in the two-woman event at Lake Placid, New York, in 2012.

She competed with Hanne Schenk in the two-woman event at the 2010 Winter Olympics in Vancouver where they finished in tenth place. She also participated in the 2014 Winter Olympics.

Meyer retired from competition after the 2013-14 season.

== European Championships ==
- 2014 European Championships – (Germany) Königssee, (gold) with Tanja Mayer
- 2012 European Championships – (Germany) Altenberg, (bronze) with Hanne Schenk
