= Dawid Kupczyk =

Polish bobsledder

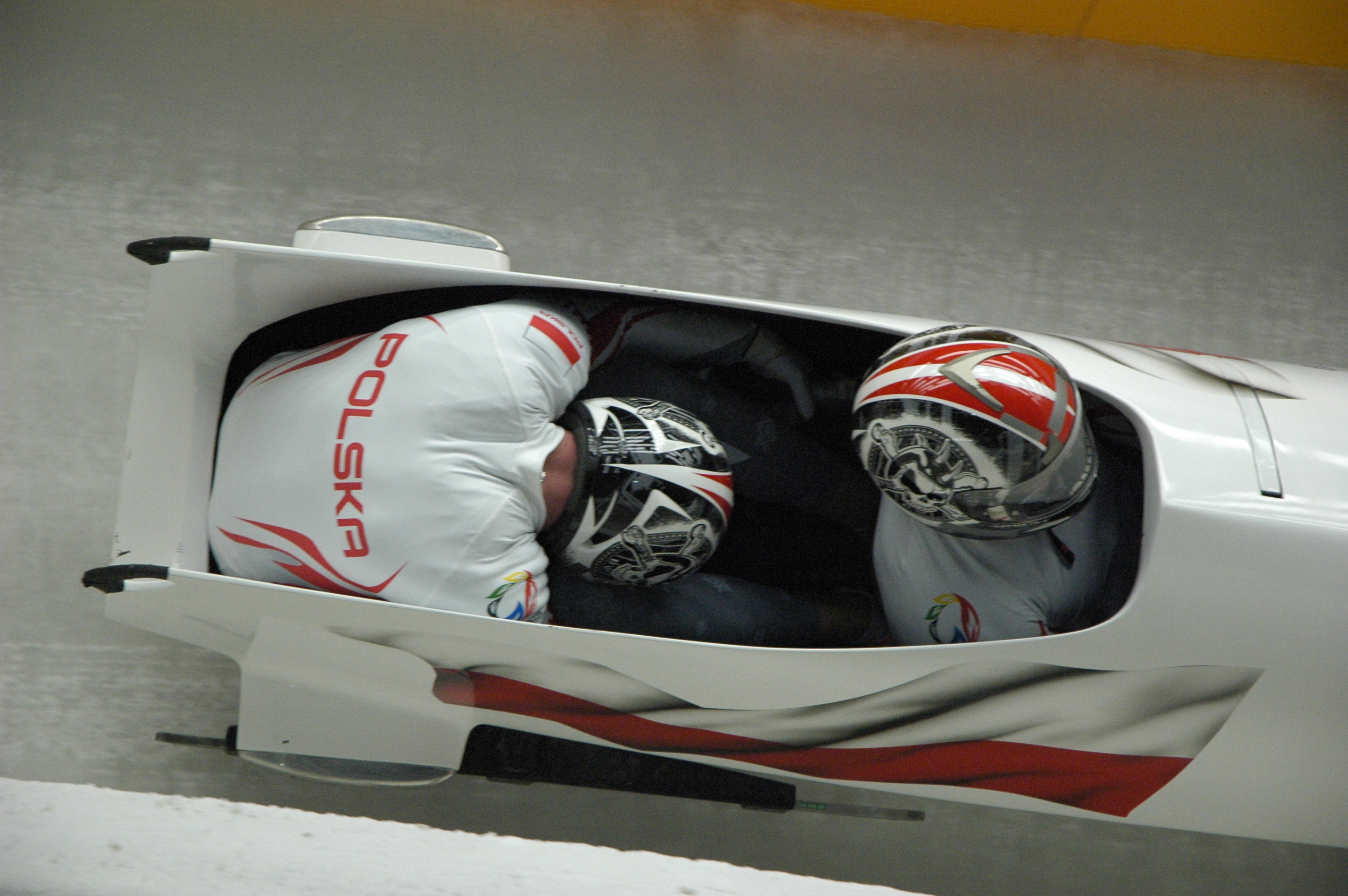
- Kupczyk at the 2014 Winter Olympics

Personal information
- Full name: Dawid Andrzej Kupczyk
- Born: 10 May 1977 (age 47); Jelenia Góra
- Height: 182 cm (6 ft 0 in)
- Weight: 98 kg (216 lb)

Sport
- Country: Poland
- Sport: Bobsleigh

Dawid Andrzej Kupczyk (born 10 May 1977 in Jelenia Góra) is a Polish bobsledder who has competed since 1997. Competing in five Winter Olympics, he earned his best finish of 14th in the four-man event at Vancouver in 2010.

Kupczyk also competed in the FIBT World Championships, earning his best finish of 20th in the four-man event both at Calgary in 2005 and at St. Moritz in 2007.

He was born in Jelenia Góra as a son of runner Andrzej Kupczyk.

Olympic Games
Preceded by Konrad Niedźwiedzki	Flagbearer for Poland; Sochi 2014	Succeeded by Zbigniew Bródka
