= Alex Baumann (bobsledder) =

Swiss bobsledder (born 1985)

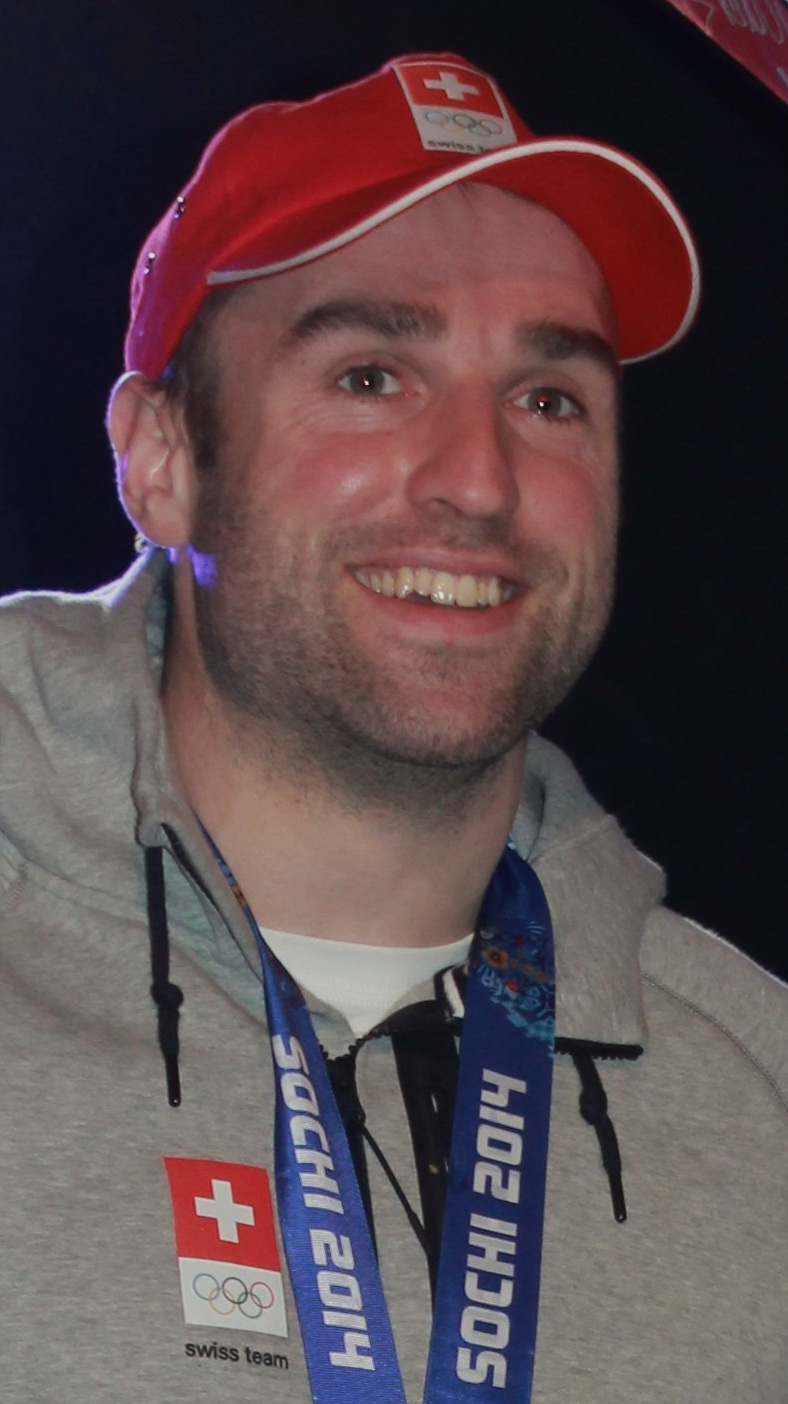
- Baumann at the 2014 Olympics

Personal information
- Nationality: Swiss
- Born: 9 March 1985 (age 41) Herisau, Appenzell Ausserrhoden, Switzerland
- Height: 1.81 m (5 ft 11 in)
- Weight: 100 kg (220 lb)

Sport
- Country: Switzerland
- Sport: Bobsleigh
Medal record
Olympic Games
Gold medal – first place	2014 Sochi	Two-man
World Championships
Bronze medal – third place	2016 Igls	Two-man

Alex Baumann (born 9 March 1985) is a Swiss bobsledder who has competed since 2007. His first World Cup victory came on 13 November 2009 in the two-man event at Utah Olympic Park in Park City.

At the 2014 Olympics Baumann won a silver medal in doubles, together with Beat Hefti, and finished in eighth place in the four-man event.
