= Nick Cunningham =

American bobsledder (born 1985)

Nick Cunningham OLY
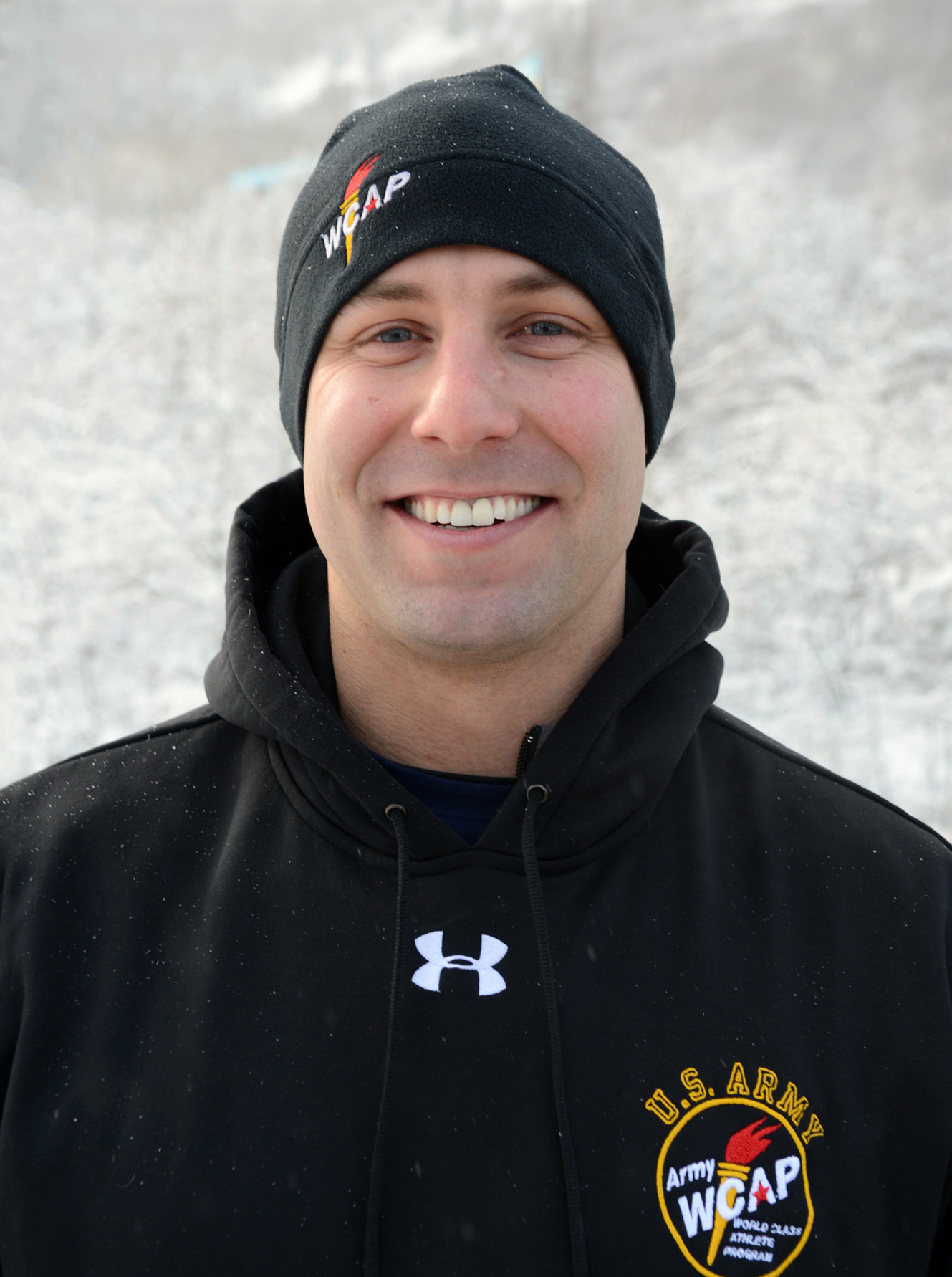
- Cunningham in 2013

Personal information
- National team: United States
- Born: May 8, 1985 (age 41) Los Gatos, California, U.S.
- Height: 5 ft 10 1/2 in (179 cm)
- Weight: 209 lb (95 kg)

Sport
- Sport: Bobsled
- Club: Boise State; U.S. Army WCAP

Nick Cunningham (born May 8, 1985) is an American bobsledder who has competed since 2008. Nick Cunningham is a sergeant in the New York Army National Guard in the 1156 Engineering Company, Vertical, and his job is a construction and masonry engineer. Cunningham graduated from Monterey Peninsula College in 2005 and Boise State University in 2008 with a degree in communications. While at BSU he was an elected team captain for the track team. Cunningham also holds a master's degree in athletic coaching education from Ohio University. When he is not bobsledding, Cunningham enjoys football, track, surfing, and rodeo. His favorite sliding memory is accepting his first gold medal and standing on top of the podium with the National Anthem being played. Cunningham made the official switch from the back of the sled to the driver's seat in 2010 and has been consistent National Team driver for the U.S. program. Coaches expect Cunningham to be vying for a spot on the 2018 Winter Olympic Team.

Cunningham began bobsled in 2008 and was immediately selected as an alternate for World Cup team. In addition, Cunningham helped push driver Mike Kohn to two gold medals on the America's Cup tour and a silver and a bronze medal at the 2009 National Championships. During 2009 World Championships, Cunningham helped push driver John Napier to an 11th-place finish.

== Olympic highlights ==
2010 Olympic Winter Games

- Placed 12th in the two-man event with a time of 3:29.78
- Placed 13th in the four-man event

2014 Olympic Winter Games

- Placed 13th in the two-man event
- Placed 12th in the four-man event

2018 Olympic Winter Games

- Placed 21st in the two-man event
- Placed 19th in the four-man event

== Career highlights ==
2011–2012 World Cup in two-man -9th in Whistler (2/12) 2011–2012 World Cup in four-man -9th in Whistler (2/12) 2011–2012 America's Cup in two-man – SILVER in Park City #1 (11/11), SILVER in Park City #2 (11/11), SILVER in Calgary #1 (11/11), SILVER in Calgary #2 (11/11), GOLD in Lake Placid #1 (12/11), GOLD in Lake Placid #2 (12/11) 2011–2012 America's Cup in four-man -SILVER in Park City #1 (11/11), SILVER in Park City #2 (11/11), GOLD in Calgary #1 (11/11), BRONZE in Calgary #2 (11/11), SILVER in Lake Placid #1 (12/11), 6th in Lake Placid #2 (12/11)

2010–2011 America's Cup in two-man -7th in Park City #1 (11/10), 7th in Park City #2 (11/10), SILVER in Calgary #1 (11/10), BRONZE in Lake Placid #1 (1/11), SILVER in Lake Placid #2 (1/11), 10th in Calgary #2 (1/11), 10th in Calgary #3 (1/11) 2010–2011 America's Cup in four-man -BRONZE in Lake Placid #1 (1/11), BRONZE in Lake Placid #2 (1/11), 9th in Calgary #2 (1/11), 7th in Calgary #3 (1/11)

2009–2010 World Cup as brakeman for Mike Kohn & John Napier in the four-man -14th in Lake Placid (11/09), 9th in Cesana (12/09), 22nd in Konigssee (1/10), 6th in St. Mortiz (1/10), 17th in igls (1/10) 2009–2010 World Cup as brakeman for Mike Kohn in the two-man -9th in Lake Placid (11/09), 2009–2010 America's Cup as brakeman for Mike Kohn in the four-man -GOLD in Lake Placid #1 (12/09), GOLD in Lake Placid #2 (12/09) 2009–2010 America's Cup as brakeman for Mike Kohn in the two-man -GOLD in Lake Placid #2 (12/09), GOLD in Lake Placid #3 (12/09) 12th at 2009 U.S. National Bobsled Push Championship 11th at 2009 World Championships in four-man 2008–09 America's Cup as a push athlete for Mike Kohn in four-man -GOLD in Calgary #1 (11/08), GOLD in Calgary #2 (11/08), 2nd in Park City #1 (11/08), BRONZE in Park City #2 (11/08) -BRONZE at 2009 National Championships SILVER at 2009 National Championship in two-man 2008–2009 World Cup Alternate for Steven Holcomb
