= Juerg Egger =

Swiss bobsledder (born 1982)

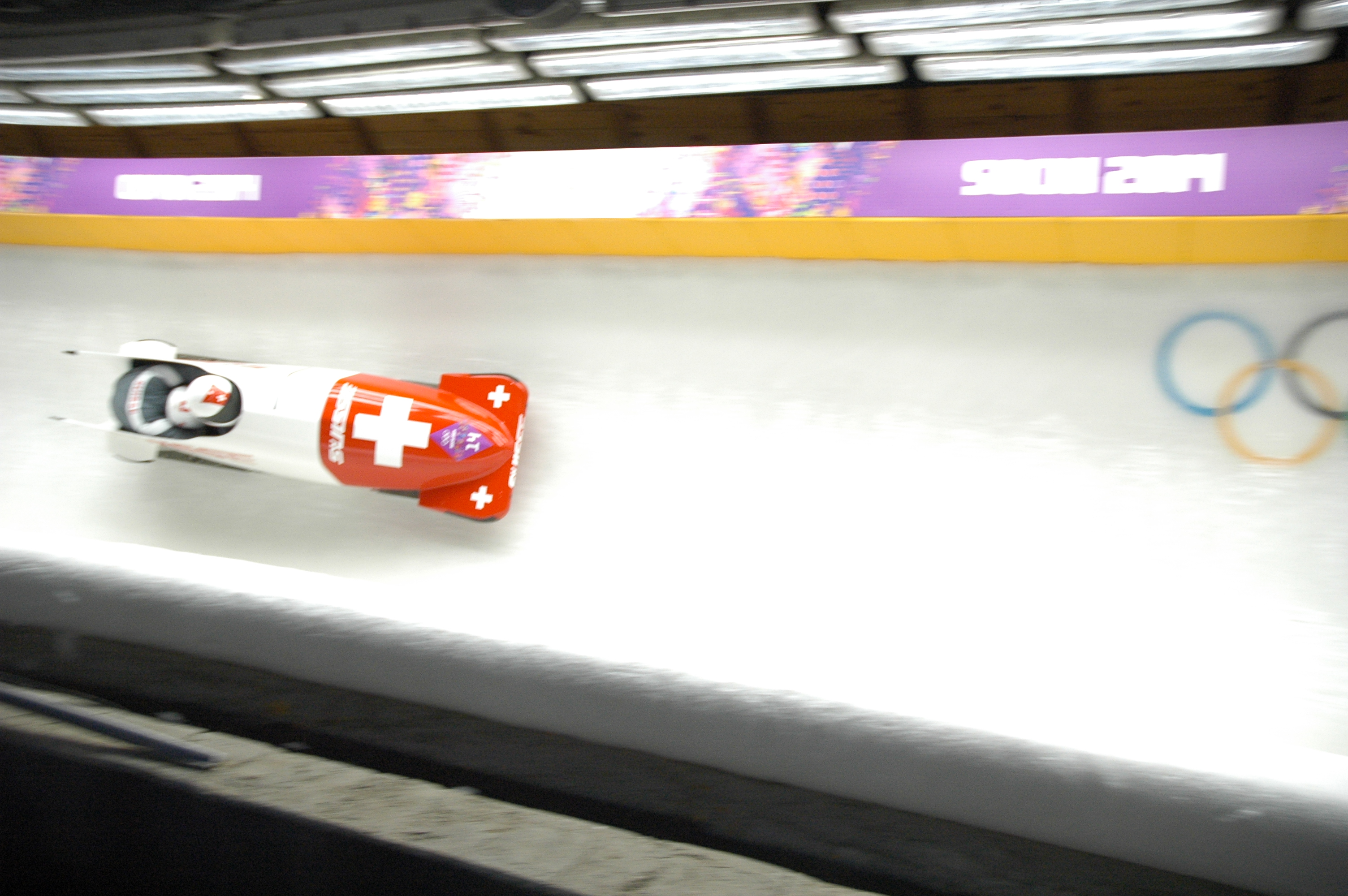
- Egger at the 2014 Winter Olympics

Personal information
- Nationality: Swiss
- Born: 1 January 1982 (age 44)

Sport
- Country: Switzerland
- Sport: Bobsleding
- Turned pro: 2005

Juerg Egger (born 1 January 1982) is a Swiss bobsledder who has competed since 2005. His best Bobsleigh World Cup finish was second in the four-man event at Cesana Pariol in January 2008.

Egger's best finish at the FIBT World Championships was eighth in the four-man event at St. Moritz in 2007.
