= Dallas Robinson =

American bobsledder

Dallas Wallen Robinson
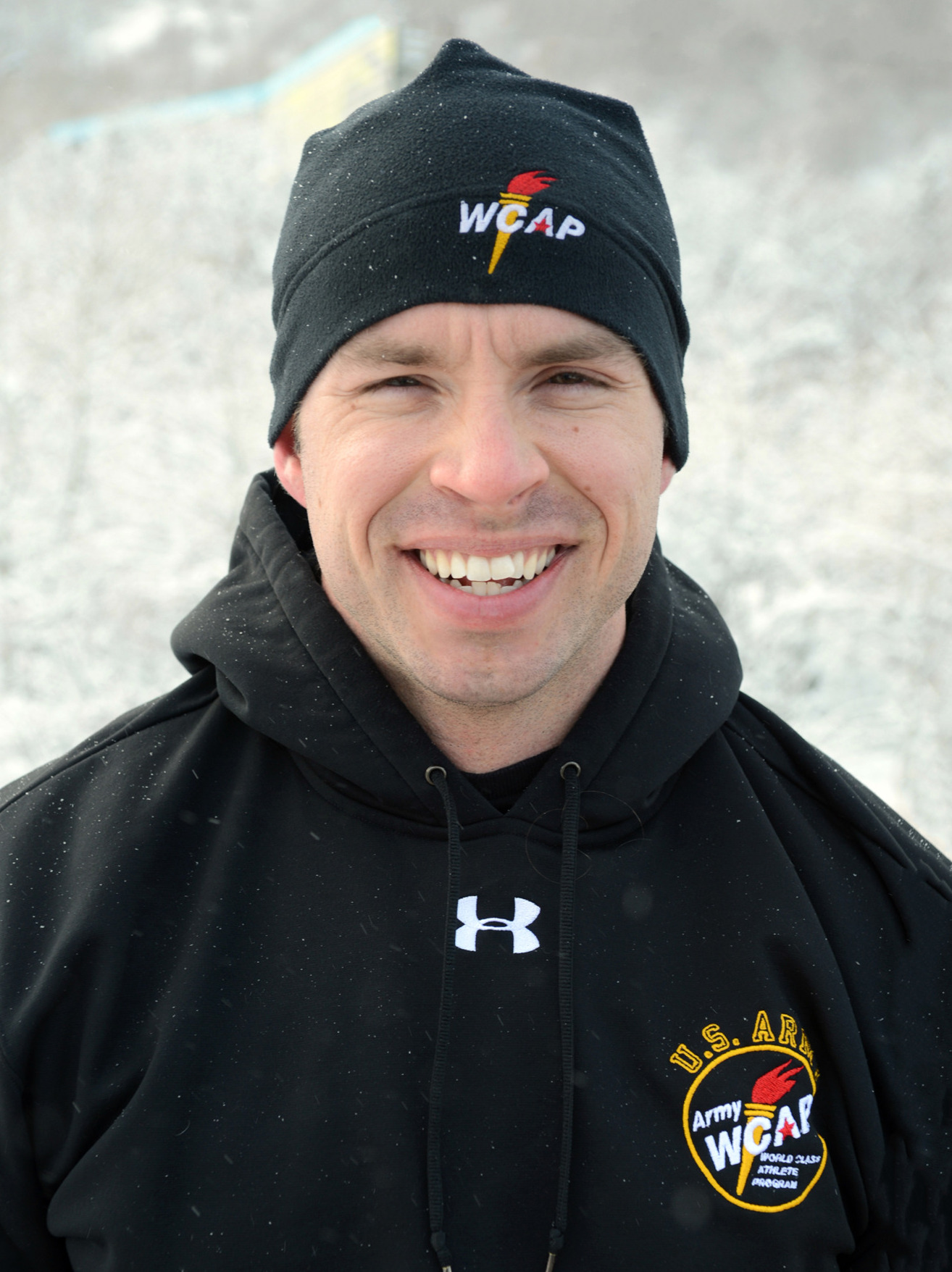
- Robinson in 2013

Personal information
- Born: March 30, 1982 (age 44) Winter Haven, Florida, U.S.
- Height: 6 ft 4 in (1.93 m)
- Weight: 229 lb (104 kg)

Personal details
- Party: Republican

Military service
- Branch/service: United States Army
- Awards: Meritorious Service Medal

Dallas Wallen Robinson (born March 30, 1982) is an American soldier and bobsledder who participated in the 2014 Winter Olympics.

== Career ==
Robinson graduated from Oldham County High School in Buckner, Kentucky and Eastern Kentucky University and Campbellsville University.

=== Athletics ===
Robinson is known as a sprinter but was also in the USA Rugby 7's and 15's pool of athletes in 2009 and 2010. In 2008 he was ranked 1st in the United States in the 55m Dash and top 10 in both the 60m and 200m races.

Robinson competed in the 2014 Winter Olympics in Sochi, Russia in both two man and four man bobsled finishing 11th and 10th. After nearly 10 years away from Olympic sports Dallas returned to compete at the 2023 U.S. Bobsled Push Championships, Lake Placid NY in dominate fashion placing 1st, 2nd, 1st, 1st, 1st.

In 2025, Robinson began competing as a steer wrestler with the International Professional Rodeo Association and the PRCA Pro Rodeo Association earning price money his first season.

Robinson owns a farm and several businesses in LaRue County, Kentucky.

=== 2026 Kentucky Senate campaign ===
In 2026, Robinson unsuccessfully ran for the 14th district of the Kentucky Senate, losing the Republican primary to pharmacist Ben Mudd.
