= Curtis Tomasevicz =

American bobsledder (born 1980)

Curt Tomasevicz
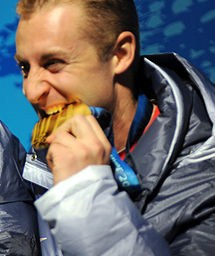
- Tomasevicz at 2010 Winter Olympics

Personal information
- Full name: Curtis Tomasevicz
- Born: September 17, 1980 (age 45)
- Height: 6 ft 1 in (185 cm)
Medal record
Men's bobsleigh
Representing the United States
Olympic Games
Gold medal – first place	2010 Vancouver	Four-man
Silver medal – second place	2014 Sochi	Four-man
World Championships
Gold medal – first place	2009 Lake Placid	Four-man
Gold medal – first place	2012 Lake Placid	Four-man
Gold medal – first place	2013 St. Moritz	Mixed team
Silver medal – second place	2007 St. Moritz	Mixed team
Bronze medal – third place	2008 Altenberg	Mixed team
Bronze medal – third place	2009 Lake Placid	Two-man
Bronze medal – third place	2009 Lake Placid	Mixed team
Bronze medal – third place	2011 Königssee	Four-man
Bronze medal – third place	2013 St. Moritz	Four-man

Curtis "Curt" Tomasevicz (born September 17, 1980) is an American bobsledder who has competed since 2004, and a former college football player. He won six medals at the FIBT World Championships with two golds (Four-man: 2009, 2012), a silver (Mixed team: 2007) and three bronzes (Two-man: 2009, Mixed team: 2008, 2009).

Tomasevicz finished sixth in the four-man event at the 2006 Winter Olympics in Turin. He was an alternate during the (2006–07) season on World Cup tour for driver Steven Holcomb and won a gold in Cesana, Italy during the 2007–08 season.

It was announced on January 15, 2010 that he made the US team in both the two-man and four-man events at the 2010 Winter Olympics, where he won a gold medal.

== Personal life ==
Tomasevicz earned his bachelor degree and Master of Science degree in electrical engineering with a minor in astrophysics, and in December 2017 a PhD in biological systems engineering, all from the University of Nebraska–Lincoln. He played fullback and middle linebacker for the Nebraska Cornhuskers football team from 2000–2003, and was named an Academic All-Big 12 player in 2002. He comes from Shelby, Nebraska. Tomasevicz serves as an Assistant Professor in biological systems engineering at the University of Nebraska–Lincoln, and also speaks at schools around Nebraska.

Tomasevicz is a faithful Catholic who has an appreciation for the Church's longstanding and fruitful relationship with science, and an appreciation for other aspects of the Church's history. http://www.ncregister.com/daily-news/olympic-gold-medalist-shares-sochi-experience/
