= Charles Berkeley (bobsleigh) =

American bobsledder

Charles Berkeley (born August 21, 1976) is an American bobsledder who has competed since 2007. His lone World Cup victory was in the two-man event at Lake Placid, New York, on 21 November 2009.

Berkeley qualified for the 2010 Winter Olympics, crashing out in the four-man event.
