= Christopher Fogt =

American bobsledder

Chris Fogt
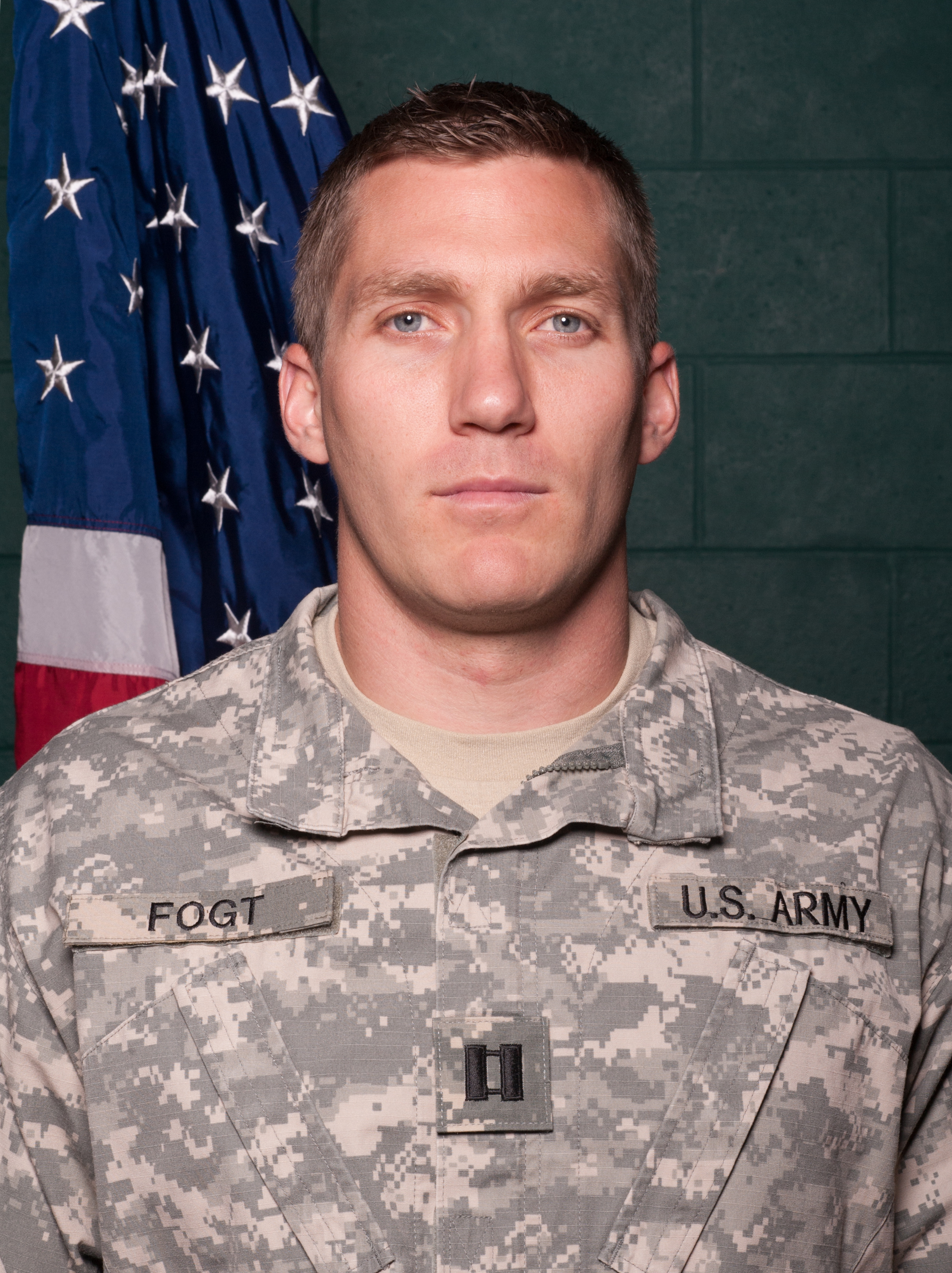
- Fogt in 2013

Personal information
- Full name: Christopher Fogt
- Born: May 29, 1983 (age 43) Orange Park, Florida, U.S.
- Height: 6 ft 0 in (1.83 m)
- Weight: 205 lb (93 kg)

Sport
- Country: United States
- Sport: Bobsled
- Club: Utah Valley; U.S. Army WCAP
Medal record
Olympic Games
Silver medal – second place	2014 Sochi	Four-man

Christopher Fogt (born May 29, 1983) is a United States Army Lieutenant Colonel, three-time USA Olympian, Olympic Silver medalist, and currently the head coach of the USA Bobsled Team. He won a Silver Medal at the 2014 Olympic Games in Sochi as a member of the famed Team Night Train, in the four-man event. He also competed in the two-man Bobsled event in Sochi, earning 12th place with pilot, Cory Butner. He competed in the 2010 Vancouver Games as a member of USA-2, in the four-man event with pilot John Napier. After taking three years off after the 2014 Winter Olympic Games in Sochi, he returned to the Sport in 2017 with long time friend and teammate Steve Langton earning a spot on his third USA Winter Olympic Team to compete in PyeongChang, 2018. He competed in PyeongChang with pilot Justin Olsen in the four-man event.

Fogt was the 2013 USA Push Champion where he set a push track record with a time of 4.96 seconds in the Canadian Ice House, Calgary. His 2013 Push Championship title beat four-time Push Champion Steve Langton who was in pursuit of his 5th consecutive Push Championship. Due to his dominant performance at the 2013 USA Bobsled Push Championships, Fogt was soon after named to the USA-1 sled, piloted by Steven Holcomb. Chris finished third in the World Push Challenge in 2013, in the Canadian Ice House, Calgary. Leading up to the 2014 Winter Olympic Games Fogt earned two World Cup Gold Medals in the two-man events in Park City, UT and Lake Placid, NY with Pilot Steven Holcomb. Fogt also earned four World Cup Gold Medals in Calgary, Park City, Lake Placid, and Koenigssee in the four-man event with teammates Steve Langton, Curt Tomasevicz, and Steven Holcomb. Fogt, Langton, and Tomasevicz continued to push on the same sled in the 2014 Olympic Winter Games for pilot Steve Holcomb, where they achieved a Silver Medal.

Chris, a resident of Utah, is also a Major in the United States Army and a participant in the U.S. Army World Class Athlete Program. He joined the U.S. Army in 2008 and deployed to Iraq shortly after the Vancouver Games. He returned to active duty following the Sochi Games. While stationed at Fort Hood, Texas served as the Company Commander for Headquarters and Headquarters Company "Spartans", 3D Engineer Battalion. He returned to bobsledding with qualifying for the 2018 Pyeongchang Games. At the time he graduated Utah Valley University in 2008 he held six school records in Track and Field. He still currently holds the indoor 400M school record with a time of 48.76. While at UVU he posted personal best times of 6.92 in the indoor 60M, 10.53 in the 100M, 21.76 in the indoor 200M, 21.38 in the outdoor 200M, and 34.40 in the indoor 300M.

He also holds two Master Degrees; one from the School of Advance Military Studies (SAMS), and another from the University of Kansas in Business and Organizational Leadership. He is married with four kids.
