= Italy national bobsleigh team =

Italy
- Association: Federazione Italiana Sport Invernali
- Team colors

Olympics
- Appearances: 22 (first in 1924)
- Medals: Gold: 4 Silver: 4 Bronze: 4

Italy national bobsleigh team is the selection that represents Italy in international bobsleigh competitions.

The Italian bobsleigh's body is traditionally painted with the rosso corsa, the international auto racing colour informally assigned to Italy.

== History ==
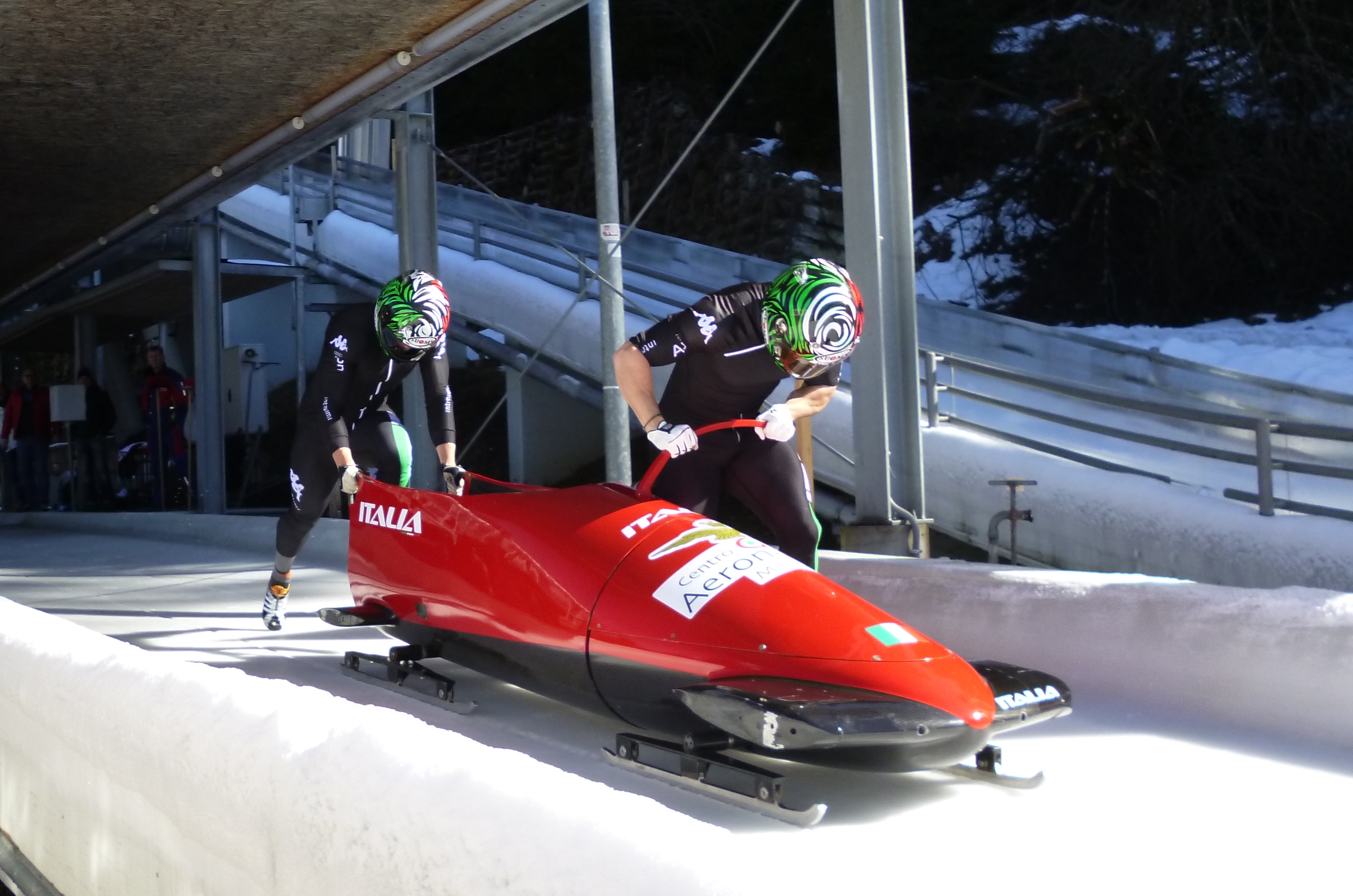
Two-men bobsleigh of the Italian Air Force national team

The sport of bobsleigh began to spread in Italy at the beginning of the 20th century, especially in Trentino and Veneto, where Federico Terschak introduced it in Cortina d'Ampezzo. In 1922, the first Italian bobsleigh championship was organised along the road of Falzarego Pass, while the following year Raffaele Zardini built the bobsleigh track in Ronco.

The Italian bobsleigh team debuted at the 1924 Winter Olympics in Chamonix with the five-man bobsleigh.

In 1925 the Bob Club of Italy was founded, which the following year established the Italian Ice Sports Federation (Federazione italiana sport del ghiaccio, FISG), which also included the Italian Skating Federation (Federazione italiana di pattinaggio) and the Italian Ice Hockey Federation (Federazione italiana di hockey sul ghiaccio).

At the 1930 World Bobsleigh Championships in Caux-sur-Montreux, first edition of the event organised by the International Bobsleigh and Skeleton Federation, the Italian national bobsleigh team won the gold medal with the four-man bobsleigh team of Franco Zaninetta, Giorgio Biasini, Antonio Dorini and Gino Rossi.

In 1933 the FISG was incorporated into the Italian Winter Sports Federation (Federazione Italiana Sport Invernali, FISI); in the same year the Mottarone bobsleigh track was built on the initiative of Luigi Tornielli, in view of the World University Championships.

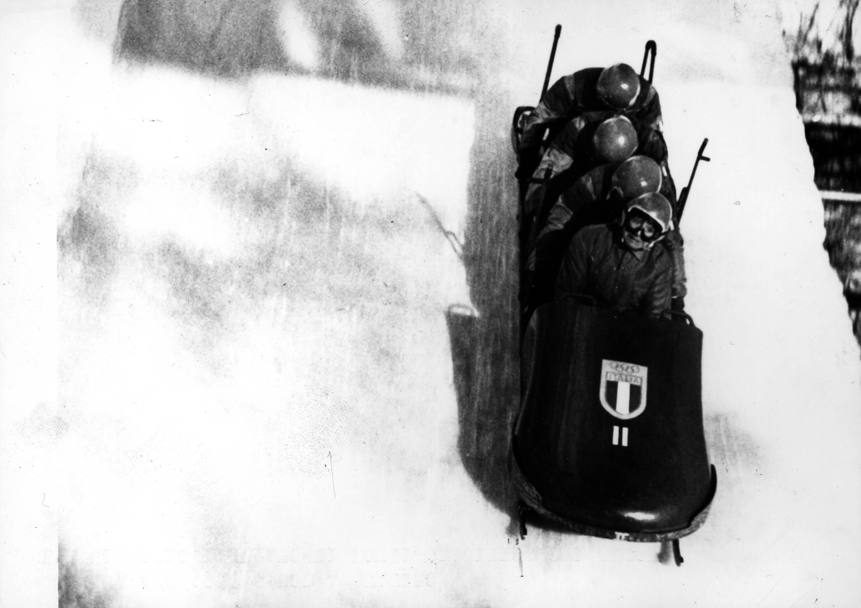
Italy-2 team at 4-man event in Cortina 1956 (silver medal)

After World War II, the Italian Winter Sports Federation turned to the Italian Air Force to look for future Italian bobsleighers among fighter pilots, imitating the US strategy: after a special course, Marshal Lamberto Dalla Costa and Major Giacomo Conti were chosen and took part in the FIBT World Championships 1953 in Garmisch. The debut of Eugenio Monti, known as the "Flying Red" (Rosso volante), who dominated the world bobsleigh scene in the 1950s and 1960s, dates back to these years. The first Italian successes were achieved at home at the 1956 Winter Olympics in Cortina d'Ampezzo, where, thanks to their excellent knowledge of the Olympic track and the innovative Podar bobsleighs, the Italian national team won the gold and silver medals in the two-man bobsleigh and the silver in the four-man bobsleigh.

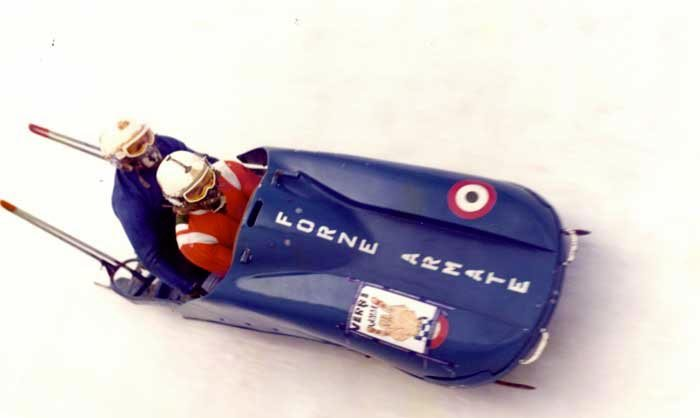
Italian Army bobsleigh in Cervinia (1974)

After the extraordinary olympic success at Cortina, and the subsequent opening of the Blue Lake bobsleigh run in Cervinia in 1963, the Italian Air Force became increasingly interested in the sport and its acceleration on bends, which was useful for training its pilots. A 'bobsleigh school' was opened, renamed in 1965 as the 'Armed Forces Bobsleigh School', to train pilots, interiors and brakemen. In 1973, Italy's national military team was formed, which took part in the first edition of Military World Bobsleigh Championships in Cervinia.

After a break of more than 30 years, the Air Force Sports Centre resumed winter sports activities in 2012 so that its athletes could take part in the 2014 Winter Olympics in Sochi.

== Participation in the Winter Olympics ==
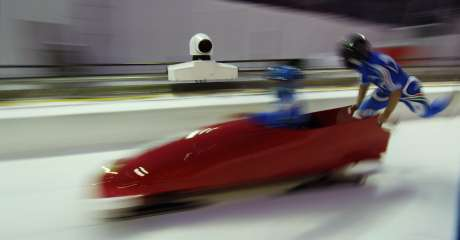
Italian two-man bobsleigh (2014)

The Italian national bobsleigh team has always taken part in at least one discipline at every Winter Olympics (except at Squaw Valley in 1960, when the organising committee did not organise any bobsleight competitions for economic reasons), winning a total of 12 Olympic medals.

Italian women made their debut with the two-woman bobsleigh at the 2002 Winter Olympics in Salt Lake City, while in Turin 2006 they won their first and so far only medal.

The largest number of Olympic medals (six) was won by Eugenio Monti, known as the Rosso volante ('Flying Red'), in whose memory the Olympic track in Cortina d'Ampezzo was named.

=== Men's four-man bobsleigh ===
Year	City	Results	Team
1924	Chamonix	6 NQ	Lodovico Obexer, Massimo Fink, Paolo Herbert, Giuseppe Steiner, Luis Trenker; Luigi Tornielli di Borgolavezzaro, Adolfo Bocchi, Leonardo Bonzi, Alfredo Spasciani, Alberto Visconti
1928	St. Moritz	21	Giancarlo Morpugo, Carlo Sem, Luigi Cerutti, Giuseppe Crivelli, Piero Marchetti
1932	Lake Placid	5	Theo Rossi Di Montelera, Agostino Lanfranchi, Gaetano Lanfranchi, Italo Cassini
1936	Garmisch-Partenkirchen	10; NQ	Tonino Brivio Sforza, Carlo Solveni, Emilio Dell'Oro, Raffaele Menardi; Francesco De Zanna, Ernesto Franceschi, Uberto Gillarduzzi, Amedeo Angeli
1948	St. Moritz	6; 11	Nino Bibbia, Gian Carlo Ronchetti, Edilberto Campadese, Luigi Cavalieri; Nino Rovelli, Enrico Airoldi, Vittorio Folonari, Remo Airoldi
1952	Oslo	10; 14	Dario Colombi, Dario Poggi, Sandro Rasini, Alberto Della Beffa; Uberto Gillarduzzi, Michele Alverà, Vittorio Folonari, Luigi Cavalieri
1956	Cortina d'Ampezzo	2; 5	Eugenio Monti, Ulrico Girardi, Renzo Alverà, Renato Mocellini; Dino De Martin, Giovanni De Martin, Giovanni Tabacchi, Carlo Da Prà
1964	Innsbruk	3; 4	Eugenio Monti, Sergio Siorpaes, Benito Rigoni, Gildo Siorpaes; Sergio Zardini, Sergio Mocellini, Ferruccio Dalla Torre, Romano Bonagura
1968	Grenoble	1; 6	Eugenio Monti, Luciano De Paolis, Roberto Zandonella, Mario Armano; Gianfranco Gaspari, Giuseppe Rescigno, Andrea Clemente, Leonardo Cavallini
1972	Sapporo	2; 8	Nevio De Zordo, Adriano Frassinelli, Corrado Dal Fabbro, Gianni Bonichon; Gianfranco Gaspari, Roberto Zandonella, Mario Armano, Luciano De Paolis
1976	Innsbruck	11; 12	Nevio De Zordo, Ezio Fiori, Roberto Porzia, Lino Benoni; Giorgio Alverà, Piero Vegnuti, Adriano Bee, Francesco Butteri
1980	Lake Placid	11	Andrea Jory, Edmund Lanziner, Georg Werth, Giovanni Modena
1984	Sarajevo	8; 17	Guerrino Ghedina, Stefano Ticci, Paolo Scaramuzza, Andrea Meneghin; Alex Wolf, Georg Beikircher, Pasquale Gesuito, Umberto Prato
1988	Calgary	10; 19	Alex Wolf, Pasquale Gesuito, Georg Beikircher, Stefano Ticci; Roberto D'Amico, Thomas Rottensteiner, Paolo Scaramuzza, Andrea Meneghin
1992	Albertville	12; 15	Pasquale Gesuito, Antonio Tartaglia, Paolo Canedi, Stefano Ticci; Günther Huber, Marco Andreatta, Thomas Rottensteiner, Marcantonio Stiffi
1994	Lillehammer	9; 22	Günter Huber, Antonio Tartaglia, Bernhard Mair, Mirco Ruggiero, Stefano Ticci; Pasquale Gesuito, Paolo Canedi, Silvio Calcagno, Marcantonio Stiffi
1998	Nagano	14; 20	Günther Huber, Antonio Tartaglia, Massimiliano Rota, Marco Menchini; Fabrizio Tosini, Andrea Pais de Libera, Enrico Costa, Sergio Chianella
2002	Nagano	19	Fabrizio Tosini, Andrea Pais de Libera, Massimiliano Rota, Giona Cividino
2006	Turin	11; 12	Fabrizio Tosini, Luca Ottolino, Antonio De Sanctis, Giorgio Morbidelli; Simone Bertazzo, Samuele Romanini, Matteo Torchio, Omar Sacco
2010	Vancouver	9T	Simone Bertazzo, Danilo Santarsiero, Samuele Romanini, Mirko Turri
2014	Sochi	18	Simone Bertazzo, Simone Fontana, Samuele Romanini, Francesco Costa
2018	Pyeongchang	27	Simone Bertazzo, Simone Fontana, Francesco Costa, Lorenzo Bilotti
2022	Beijing	15; 27	Patrick Baumgartner, Lorenzo Bilotti, Eric Fantazzini, Alex Verginer; Robert Gino Mircea, José Delmas Obou, Alex Pagnini, Mattia Variola
2026	Milano Cortina	5	Patrick Baumgartner, Lorenzo Bilotti, Eric Fantazzini, Robert Mircea

=== Men's two-man bobsleigh ===
Year	City	Results	Team
1932	Lake Placid	6; 8	Theo Rossi Di Montelera, Italo Cassini; Agostino Lanfranchi, Gaetano Lanfranchi
1936	Garmisch-Partenkirchen	11; 12	Edgardo Vaghi, Dario Poggi; Tonino Brivio Sforza, Carlo Solveni
1948	St. Moritz	6; 8	Mario Vitali, Dario Poggi; Nino Bibbia, Edilberto Campadese
1952	Oslo	10; 12	Alberto Della Beffa, Dario Colombi; Uberto Gillarduzzi, Luigi Cavalieri
1956	Cortina d'Ampezzo	1; 2	Lamberto Dalla Costa, Giacomo Conti; Eugenio Monti, Renzo Alverà
1964	Innsbruck	2; 3	Sergio Zardini, Romano Bonagura; Eugenio Monti, Sergio Siorpaes
1968	Grenoble	1; 12	Eugenio Monti, Luciano De Paolis; Rinaldo Ruatti, Sergio Mocellini
1972	Sapporo	4; 10	Gianfranco Gaspari, Mario Armano; Enzo Vicario, Corrado Dal Fabbro
1976	Innsbruck	8; 16	Giorgio Alverà, Franco Perruquet; Nevio De Zordo, Ezio Fiori
1980	Lake Placid	14; 16	Andrea Jory, Edmund Lanziner; Giuseppe Soravia, Georg Werth
1984	Sarajevo	7; 9	Guerrino Ghedina, Andrea Meneghin; Marco Bellodis, Stefano Ticci
1988	Calgary	17; 19	Alex Wolf, Georg Beikircher; Ivo Ferriani, Stefano Ticci
1992	Albertville	5; 12	Günther Huber, Stefano Ticci; Pasquale Gesuito, Antonio Tartaglia
1994	Lillehammer	3; 9	Günther Huber, Stefano Ticci; Pasquale Gesuito, Antonio Tartaglia
1998	Nagano	1T; 14	Günther Huber, Antonio Tartaglia; Fabrizio Tosini, Enrico Costa
2002	Salt Lake City	8; 11T	Günther Huber, Antonio Tartaglia; Cristian La Grassa, Fabrizio Tosini
2006	Turin	9; 13	Simone Bertazzo, Matteo Torchio; Samuele Romanini, Fabrizio Tosini
2010	Vancouver	17; AC	Fabrizio Tosini, Sergio Riva; Simone Bertazzo, Samuele Romanini
2014	Sochi	14	Simone Bertazzo, Simone Fontana
2018	Pyeongchang	Not attending	
2022	Beijing	21	Patrick Baumgartner, Robert Gino Mircea
2026	Milano Cortina	7	Patrick Baumgartner, Robert Mircea

=== Women's two-woman bobsleigh ===
Year	City	Results	Team
2002	Salt Lake City	7	Gerda Weissensteiner, Antonella Bellutti
2006	Turin	3; 12	Gerda Weissensteiner, Jennifer Isacco; Jessica Gillarduzzi, Fabiana Mollica
2010	Vancouver	13	Jessica Gillarduzzi, Laura Curione
2014	Sochi	not attending	
2018	Pyeongchang	not attending	
2022	Beijing	not attending	
2026	Milano Cortina	20; 23	Giada Andreutti, Alessia Gatti; Simona de Silvestro, Anna Costella

=== Women's monobob ===
Year	City	Results	Team
2022	Beijing	15	Giada Andreutti
2026	Milano Cortina	23; 24	Simona de Silvestro; Giada Andreutti

=== Olympic medals ===
Bobsleigh	Gold	Silver	Bronze	Total
2-man	3	2	2	7
4-man	1	2	1	4
2-woman	0	0	1	1
Totals (3 entries)	4	4	4	12

=== Olympic medalists ===
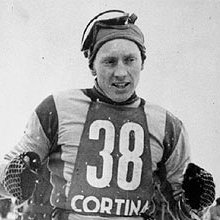
Eugenio Monti, the 'Flying Red', won 6 olympic medals.

Bobsledder	Gold	Silver	Bronze	Total
Eugenio Monti	2	2	2	6
Luciano De Paolis	2	0	0	2
Günther Huber	1	0	1	2
Mario Armano	1	0	0	1
Giacomo Conti	1	0	0	1
Lamberto Dalla Costa	1	0	0	1
Antonio Tartaglia	1	0	0	1
Roberto Zandonella	1	0	0	1
Renzo Alverà	0	2	0	2
Romano Bonagura	0	1	0	1
Gianni Bonichon	0	1	0	1
Corrado Dal Fabbro	0	1	0	1
Nevio De Zordo	0	1	0	1
Adriano Frassinelli	0	1	0	1
Ulrico Girardi	0	1	0	1
Renato Mocellini	0	1	0	1
Sergio Zardini	0	1	0	1
Sergio Siorpaes	0	0	2	2
Jennifer Isacco	0	0	1	1
Benito Rigoni	0	0	1	1
Gildo Siorpaes	0	0	1	1
Stefano Ticci	0	0	1	1
Gerda Weissensteiner	0	0	1	1

== See also ==
- Italy at the Olympics
- Rosso corsa
- Eugenio Monti olympic track
- Cesana Pariol

== Bibliography ==
- Rodolfo Carrera. "Bob". Enciclopedia dello sport. Istituto dell'Enciclopedia Italiana.
- "Italy national bobsleigh team". Olympedia.
- Stefano Rotta (2010). Rosso ghiaccio: Eugenio Monti, dietro la leggenda. Arezzo: Limena. ISBN 978-88-6041-044-3.
