= Bobsleigh at the 2006 Winter Olympics – Two-woman =

Two-woman at the XX Olympic Winter Games
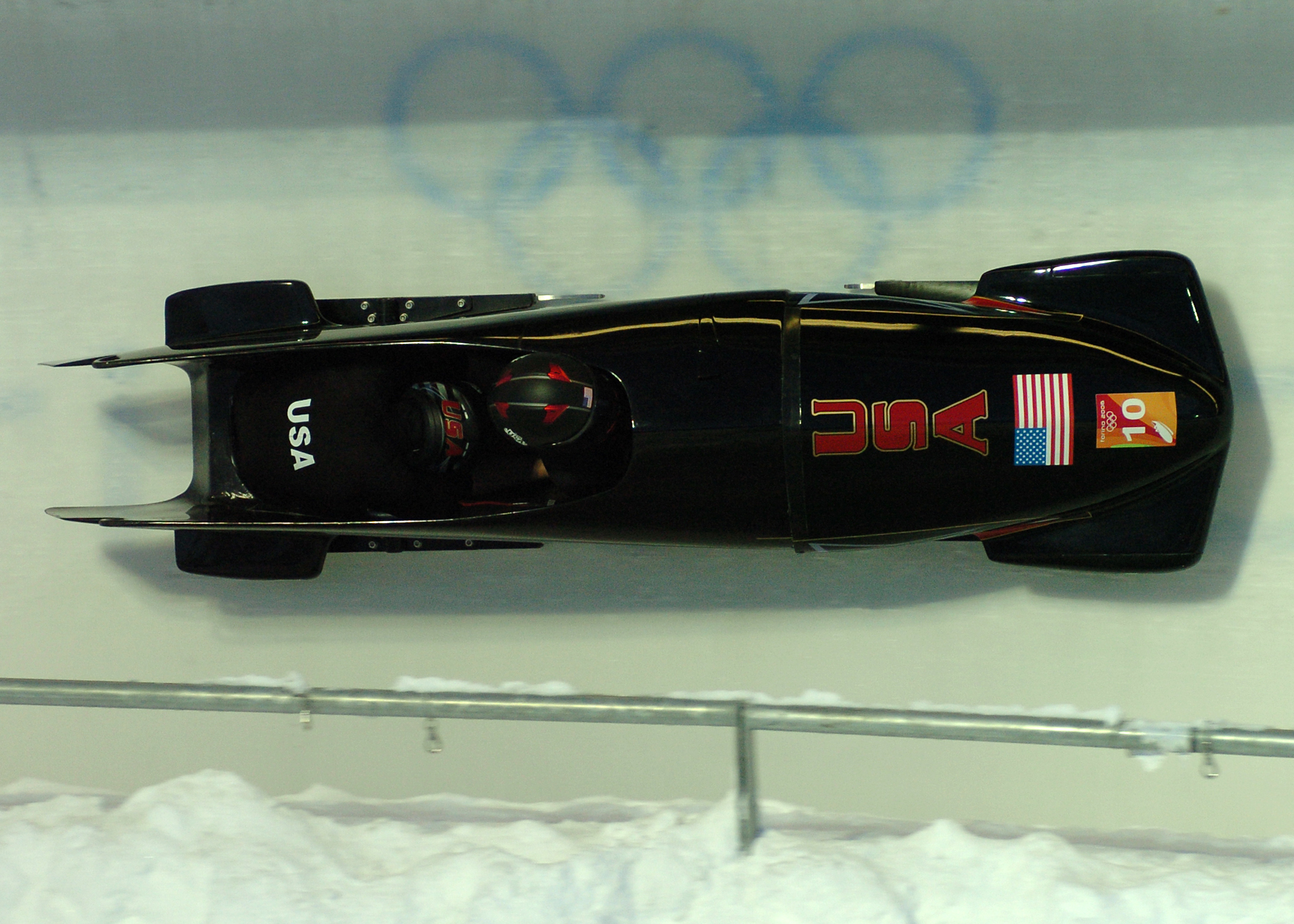
- The USA-1 sled of Rohbock and Fleming traverses a corner.
- Venue: Cesana Pariol
- Dates: February 20 — 21, 2006
- Competitors: 32 from 10 nations
- Winning time: 3:49.98

Medalists
1st place, gold medalist(s)		Sandra Kiriasis, Anja Schneiderheinze	Germany
2nd place, silver medalist(s)		Shauna Rohbock, Valerie Fleming	United States
3rd place, bronze medalist(s)		Gerda Weissensteiner, Jennifer Isacco	Italy

The Two-woman bobsleigh competition at the 2006 Winter Olympics in Turin, Italy was held on 20 and 21 February, at Cesana Pariol.

== Records ==
While the IOC does not consider bobsled times eligible for Olympic records, the FIBT does maintain records for both the start and a complete run at each track it competes.

Prior to this competition, the existing Cesana Pariol track records were as follows.

Type	Date	Team	Time
Start	21 January 2005	United States; Shauna Rohbock; Valerie Fleming	5.22
Run	7 January 2006	Italy; Gerda Weissensteiner; Jennifer Isacco	58.57

The following track records were established during this event.

Type	Date	Run	Team	Time
Start	20 February	1	Canada (CAN-1); Helen Upperton; Heather Moyse	5.16
Run	20 February	1	Germany (GER-2); Susi Lisa Erdmann; Nicole Herschmann	57.26
Run	20 February	1	Germany (GER-1); Sandra Kiriasis; Anja Schneiderheinze	57.16

== Results ==
15 of the 16 two-woman teams entered for the event completed all four runs, with the Netherlands-1 team of Broeders and Pennings the only team not to do so. The Dutch pair crashed on the first run, and, while neither was injured, they did not compete in subsequent runs.

The total time for all four runs was used to determine the final ranking. Sandra Kiriasis and Anja Schneiderheinze, the 2005 World Champions won gold by 0.71 seconds, having the fastest time in three of the four runs.

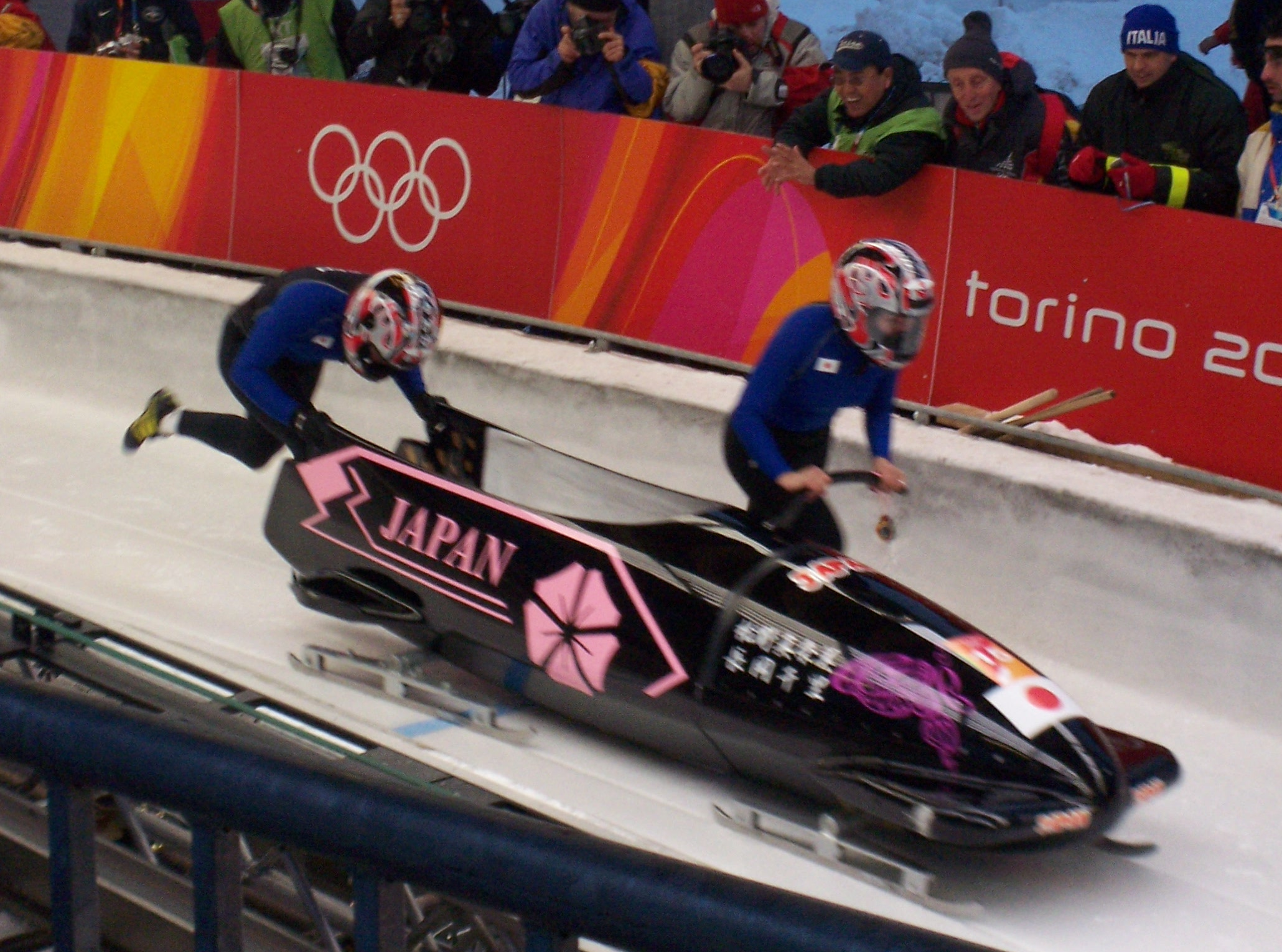
Chisato Nagaoka and Manami Hino at 2006 Winter Olympics

Rank	Country	Athletes	Run 1	Run 2	Run 3	Run 4	Total
Gold medal	Germany (GER-1)	Sandra Kiriasis; Anja Schneiderheinze	57.16	57.77	57.34	57.71	3:49.98
Silver medal	United States (USA-1)	Shauna Rohbock; Valerie Fleming	57.37	57.65	57.78	57.89	3:50.69
Bronze medal	Italy (ITA-1)	Gerda Weissensteiner; Jennifer Isacco	57.50	57.67	57.71	58.13	3:51.01
4	Canada (CAN-1)	Helen Upperton; Heather Moyse	57.37	57.77	58.09	57.83	3:51.06
5	Germany (GER-2)	Susi Lisa Erdmann; Nicole Herschmann	57.26	57.75	58.04	58.27	3:51.32
6	United States (USA-2)	Jean Prahm; Vonetta Flowers	57.97	57.67	57.81	58.33	3:51.78
7	Russia	Victoria Tokovaia; Nadezhda Orlova	57.64	57.72	58.44	58.13	3:51.93
8	Switzerland (SUI-1)	Maya Bamert; Martina Feusi	57.72	57.78	58.00	58.54	3:52.04
9	Great Britain	Nicola Minichiello; Jackie Davies	57.78	57.49	58.41	58.48	3:52.16
10	Switzerland (SUI-2)	Sabina Hafner; Cora Huber	57.86	57.92	58.73	58.35	3:52.86
11	Netherlands (NED-2)	Eline Jurg; Kitty van Haperen	58.05	58.08	58.42	58.353	3:52.90
12	Italy (ITA-2)	Jessica Gillarduzzi; Fabiana Mollica	58.26	57.77	58.38	58.55	3:52.96
13	Canada (CAN-2)	Suzanne Gavine-Hlady; Jamie Cruickshank	58.49	57.86	58.65	58.82	3:52.96
14	Australia	Astrid Loch-Wilkinson; Kylie Reed	58.53	58.85	59.00	58.73	3:55.11
15	Japan	Manami Hino; Chisato Nagaoka	59.41	58.80	59.51	59.77	3:57.49
-	Netherlands (NED-1)	Ilse Broeders; Jeannette Pennings	60.13	DNS	—	—	—
