= Gillarduzzi =

Gillarduzzi is a surname. Notable people with the surname include:

- Jessica Gillarduzzi (born 1980), Italian bobsledder
- Luigi Gillarduzzi (1822–1856), Austrian-Italian painter
- Sisto Gillarduzzi (1908–1989), Italian bobsledder and alpine skier
- Umberto Gillarduzzi (1909–1994), Italian bobsledder
