= Urta Rozenstruik =

Dutch sprinter and bobsledder

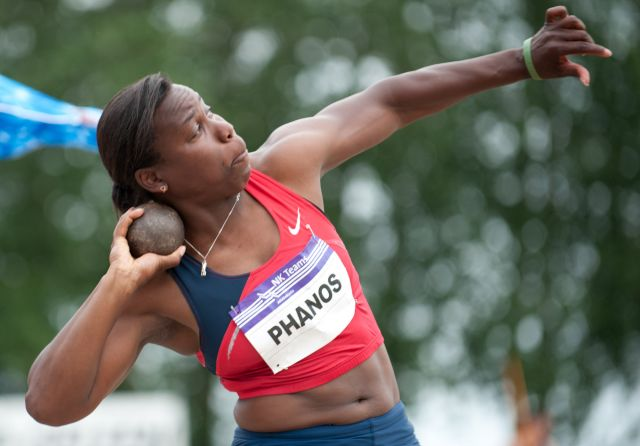
Rozenstruik in 2010

Urta Rozenstruik (born 20 May 1975 in Paramaribo) is a Dutch sprinter and bobsledder born in Suriname. Rozenstruik started with international bobsleigh competitions in 2002. She is a runner in a 2-bob mostly alongside Eline Jurg.

In 2005 two Dutch female bobs qualified for the 2006 Winter Olympics in Turin, however the team line-ups were still unsure. At the qualification play-off (named bob-off) held in Oberhof, Germany, four competitors fought for two seats behind Jurg and the other driver Ilse Broeders. Jurg's main runner Christel Bertens was the main victim of the qualification process and ended up in fourth position. Jeannette Pennings was teamed-up with her main driver Broeders, while Bertens was replaced by Kitty van Haperen instead, Broeders' first back-up runner.

Rozenstruik, Jurg's back-up runner at the time became third and was the reserve runner in case anything would happen with either Pennings or Van Haperen. At the Olympics she saw Broeders/Pennings starting off first, crashing and causing concentration trouble for Jurg/Van Haperen who saw it all happen. This resulted in disappointing results and an eleventh position overall after four runs.
