= Bertens =

Bertens is a surname. Notable people with the surname include:

- Christel Bertens (born 1983), Dutch bobsledder and track and field athlete
- Huub Bertens (born 1960), Dutch bridge player
- Kiki Bertens (born 1991), Dutch tennis player

== See also ==
- Bertāns
- Mertens
