= Kitty van Haperen =

Dutch athlete and bobsledder

Kitty van Haperen (born 20 April 1976) is a Dutch retired athlete and bobsledder.

== Biography ==
Van Haperen was born at Tilburg. She started her career in athletics and reached the national rankings in 1991 in javelin throw. Since then she always was among the best ten of her country (at first in the youth and later with the seniors), even in 2005 when she made her final decision to become a bobsledder she still was second. In total Van Haperen became a six-time Dutch national champion in javelin throw, for the first time aged 20 in 1996 and the last time in 2004. On 28 July 1999 she threw 56.31 metres, a new Dutch national record, which she held until 17 June 2007 when Bregje Crolla reached 57.57 metres. After she reached the Dutch record her development in the sport stopped and never was able to progress further, not even after switching to a new coach, German Helge Zöllkau. As a result, she decided it was time for something new and after some talks with Ilse Broeders and Jeannette Pennings she started off as a bobsledder in 2004, breaking internationally through in 2005 as Broeders' back-up runner in case anything would happen with Pennings.

Later in 2005 two Dutch female bobs qualified for the 2006 Winter Olympics in Turin, however the team line-ups were still unsure. At the qualification play-off (named bob-off) held in Oberhof, Germany, four competitors fought for two seats behind Broeders and the other driver Eline Jurg. Christel Bertens, Jurg's main runner was the main victim of the qualification process and ended up in fourth position. Jeannette Pennings was teamed-up with her main driver Broeders, while Bertens was replaced by Van Haperen who finished second. Jurg's back-up runner Urta Rozenstruik became the Olympic back-up runner. At the Olympics Broeders/Pennings started off first, but crashed, causing concentration trouble for Jurg/Van Haperen who saw it all happen. This resulted in disappointing results and an eleventh position overall after four runs. Despite these happenings Van Haperen did not return to the track and field competitions, but she focusses totally on bobsledding.
