= Tosini =

Tosini is a surname. Notable people with the surname include:

- Jennifer Tosini (born 1968), American lawyer and politician
- Michele Tosini (1503–1577), Italian painter
- Fabrizio Tosini (born 1969), Italian bobsledder
