= Christel Bertens =

Dutch bobsledder and track & field athlete

Christel Bertens (born 29 May 1983 in Tilburg) is a Dutch bobsledder and track and field athlete. Bertens is a runner in a 2-bob mostly alongside Eline Jurg.

In 2005 two Dutch female bobs qualified for the 2006 Winter Olympics in Turin, however the team line-ups were still unsure. At the qualification play-off (named bob-off) held in Oberhof, Germany, four competitors fought for two seats behind Jurg and the other driver Ilse Broeders. Bertens was the main victim of the qualification process and ended up in fourth position. Jeannette Pennings was teamed-up with her main driver Broeders, while Bertens was replaced by Kitty van Haperen instead, Broeders' first back-up runner. Urta Rozenstruik, Jurg's back-up runner became third and was the reserve runner in case anything would happen with either Pennings or Van Haperen.
