= Meneghin (surname) =

Meneghin is an Italian surname. Notable people with the surname include:

- Andrea Meneghin (born 1974), Italian retired professional basketball player and active coach
- Andrea Meneghin (bobsleigh) (born 1958), Italian bobsledder
- Dino Meneghin (born 1950), Italian former basketball player
