= Rosso corsa =

Red colour used on Italian racing cars

Color coordinates
- Hex triplet: #E4002B
- sRGB^{B} (r, g, b): (228, 0, 43)
- HSV (h, s, v): (349°, 100%, 89%)
- CIELCh_{uv} (L, C, h): (48, 154, 10°)
- Source: Pantone
- B: Normalized to [0–255] (byte)

Rosso corsa (lit. "racing red" in Italian) is the red international motor racing colour of cars entered by teams from Italy.

Since the 1920s, Italian race cars of Alfa Romeo, Maserati, Lancia, and later Ferrari and Abarth have been painted in rosso corsa ("racing red"). This was the customary national racing colour of Italy as recommended between the world wars by the organisations that later became the FIA. In that scheme of international auto racing colours, German cars were white or silver (Silver Arrows), French cars were blue (Bleu de France), British cars were green (British racing green), etc.

Although it has never been officially codified, there is general consensus that it corresponds to Pantone 185 C.

== History ==
=== Motor racing ===
Discussions regarding the adoption of a scheme of national colours in motorsport began with the Coppa Gordon Bennett in 1900. Three years later, the scheme was formalized by the then Association Internationale des Automobile Clubs Reconnus. Italy was initially assigned black, a colour which had a short life, as after only a couple of years, for reasons that remain unknown, Italian cars switched to the red previously reserved for the United States.

In the Peking to Paris race of 1907, the first to arrive in Paris was Prince Scipione Borghese, an Italian aristocrat. He was accompanied by Luigi Barzini, a journalist who worked for The Daily Telegraph, and a valet, Ettore Guizzardi, who acted as his mechanic and traveled with a supply of Lanson champagne. The prince was so confident of winning that he took a detour of several hundred miles from Moscow to St Petersburg for a dinner in honour of the team, and afterwards headed back to Moscow and rejoined the race. Their chief rival was Charles Goddard, a fairground worker and con artist who, until he learned of the race from a scrap of newspaper he found blowing in the wind, had never sat in a motor car and was arrested for fraud as he approached the finish line.

Goddard, who came second, lacked the resources of Borghese and had to beg fellow competitors for fuel. In a desperate attempt to catch up, he set an endurance record for non-stop driving for 24 hours. The prince's prize was simply a magnum of Mumm champagne, and the red colour of his 1907 Itala car was adopted by Italy as its racing colour in his honour.

Over the first decades of the twentieth century, a precise international colour scheme was established: among the most important countries, French racing blue was assigned to French cars, – accompanied by silver following the Eifelrennen of 1934 – to German cars, British racing green to British cars, white with blue racing stripes to American cars, white and red to Japanese cars, and, as mentioned, red to Italian cars. Consequently, manufacturers such as Alfa Romeo, Lancia, and Maserati – and subsequently Scuderia Ferrari and more rarely Fiat – painted their competition cars in this colour so that spectators could identify the Italian teams competing in motor racing championships.

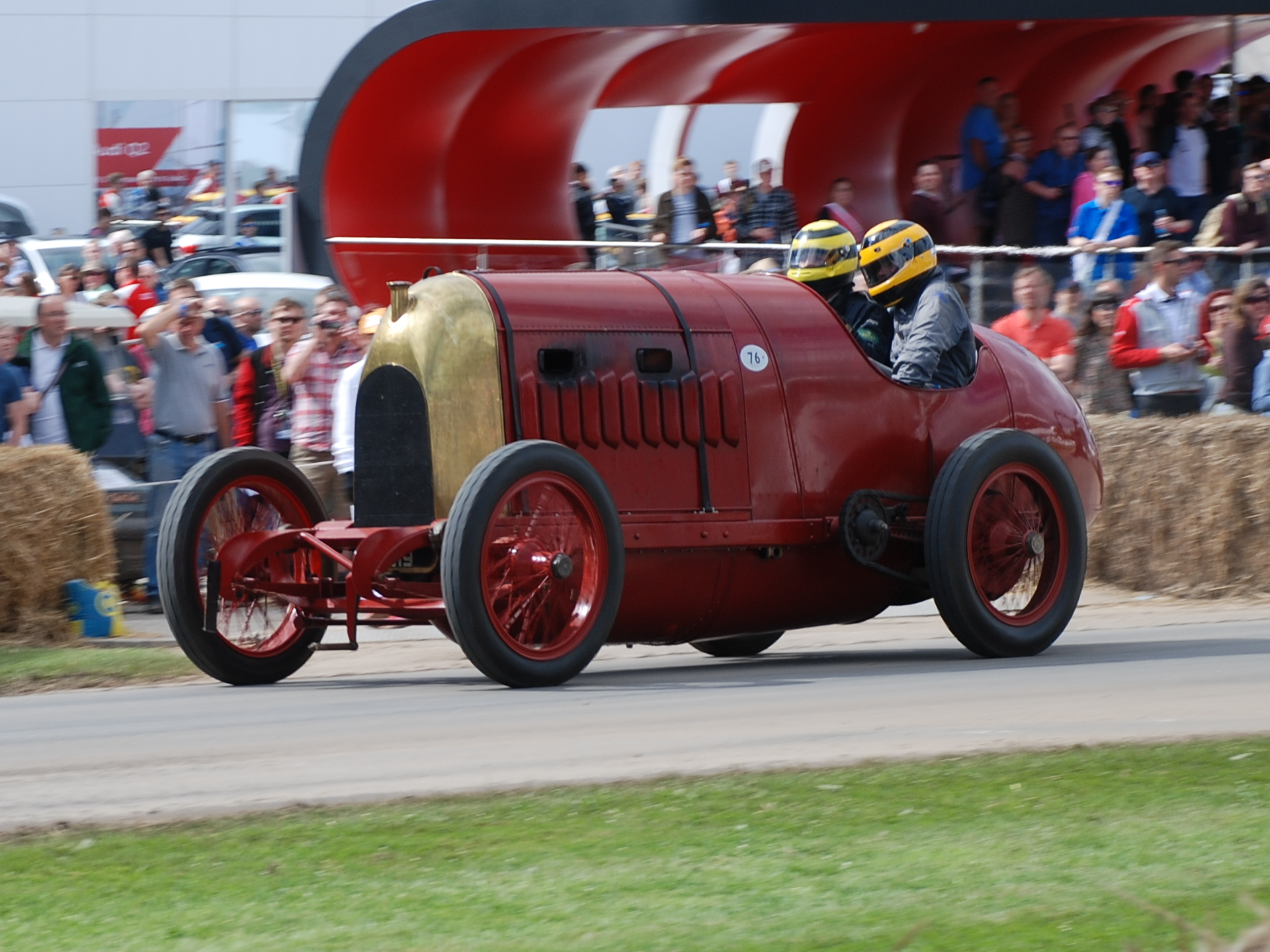
The Fiat S76 Record in FIAT red (1911-12)

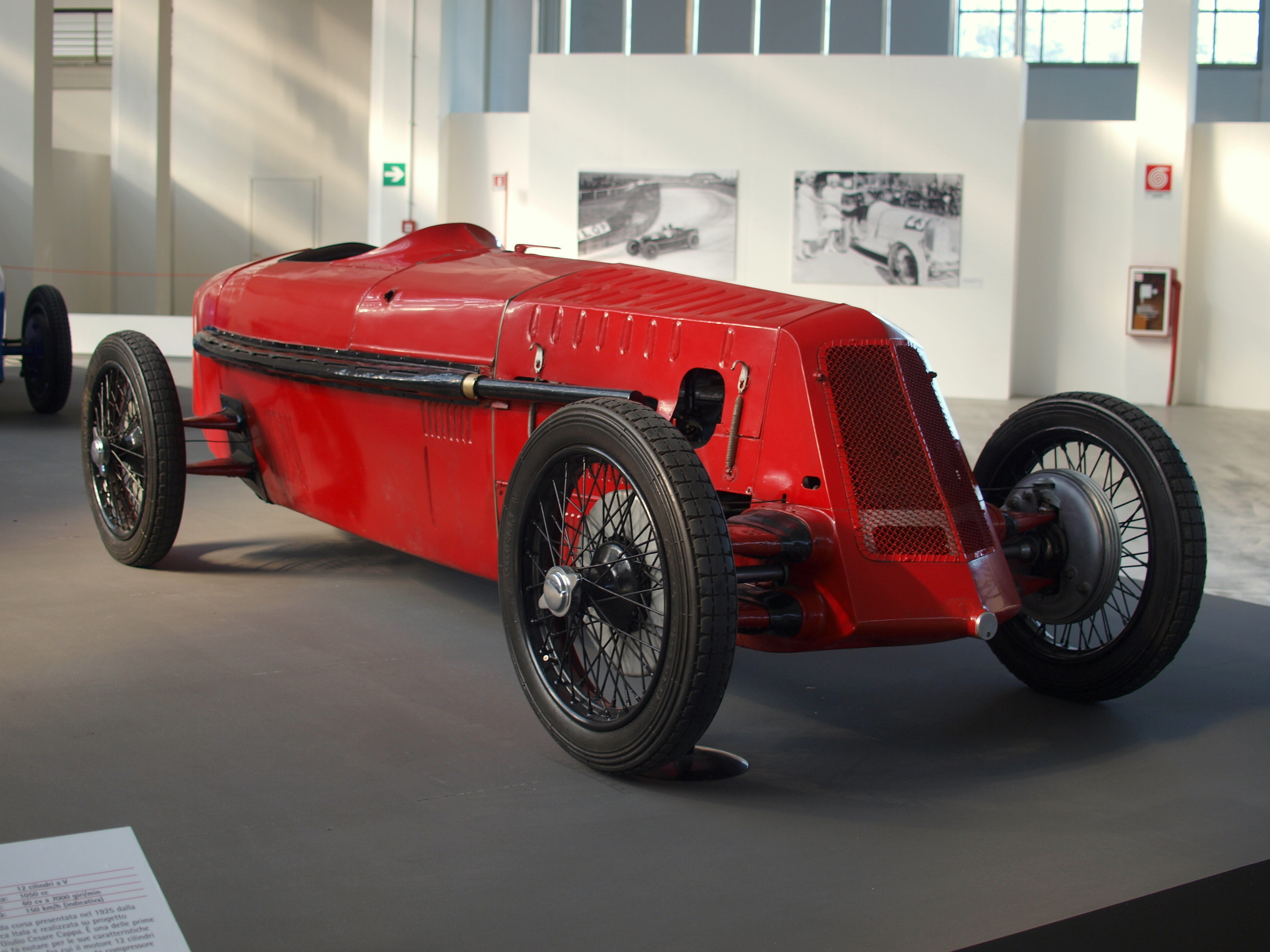
An Itala Type 11 (1925)

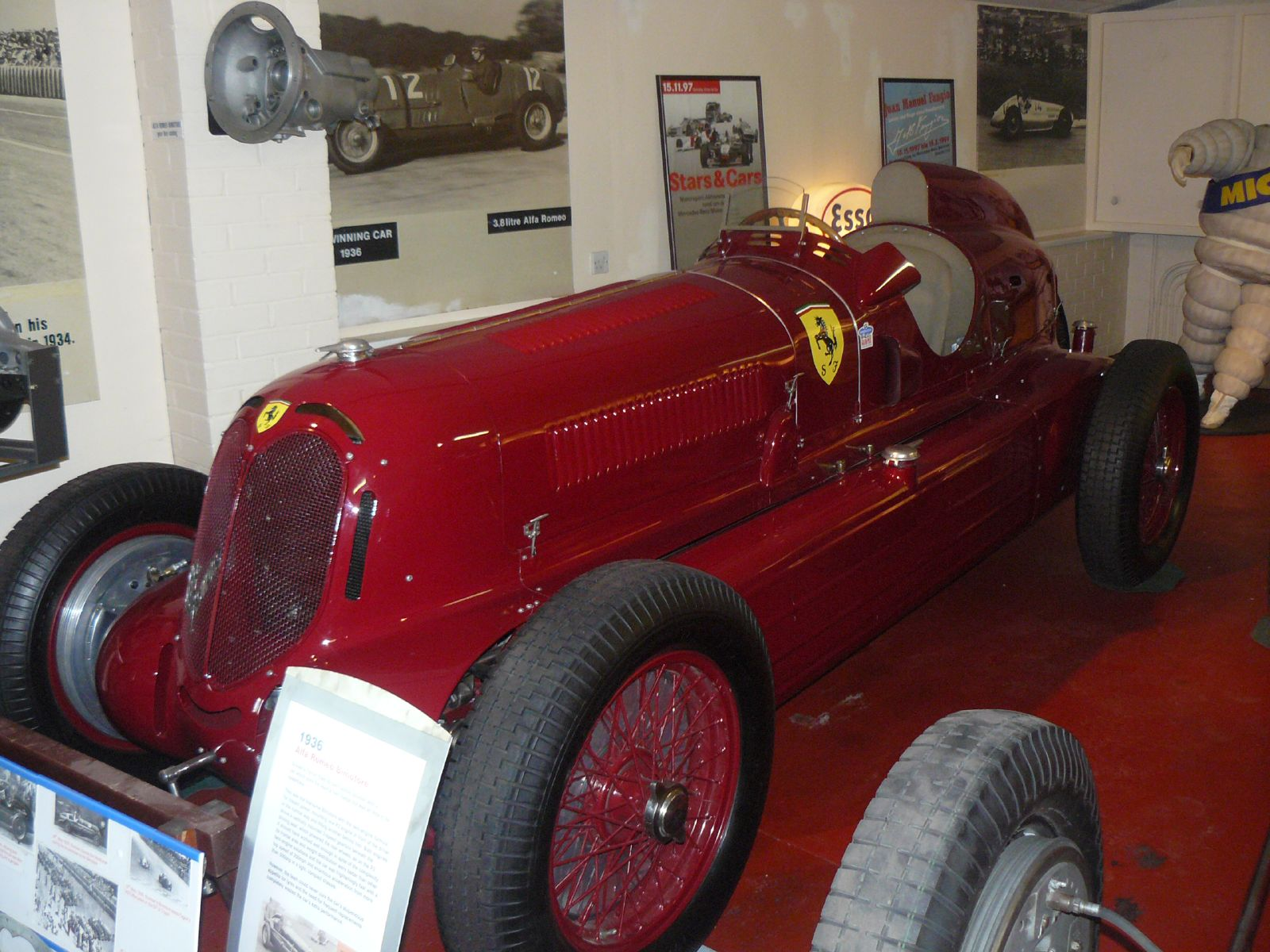
A Scuderia Ferrari Alfa Romeo 16C twin-engine (1935) in Alfa red

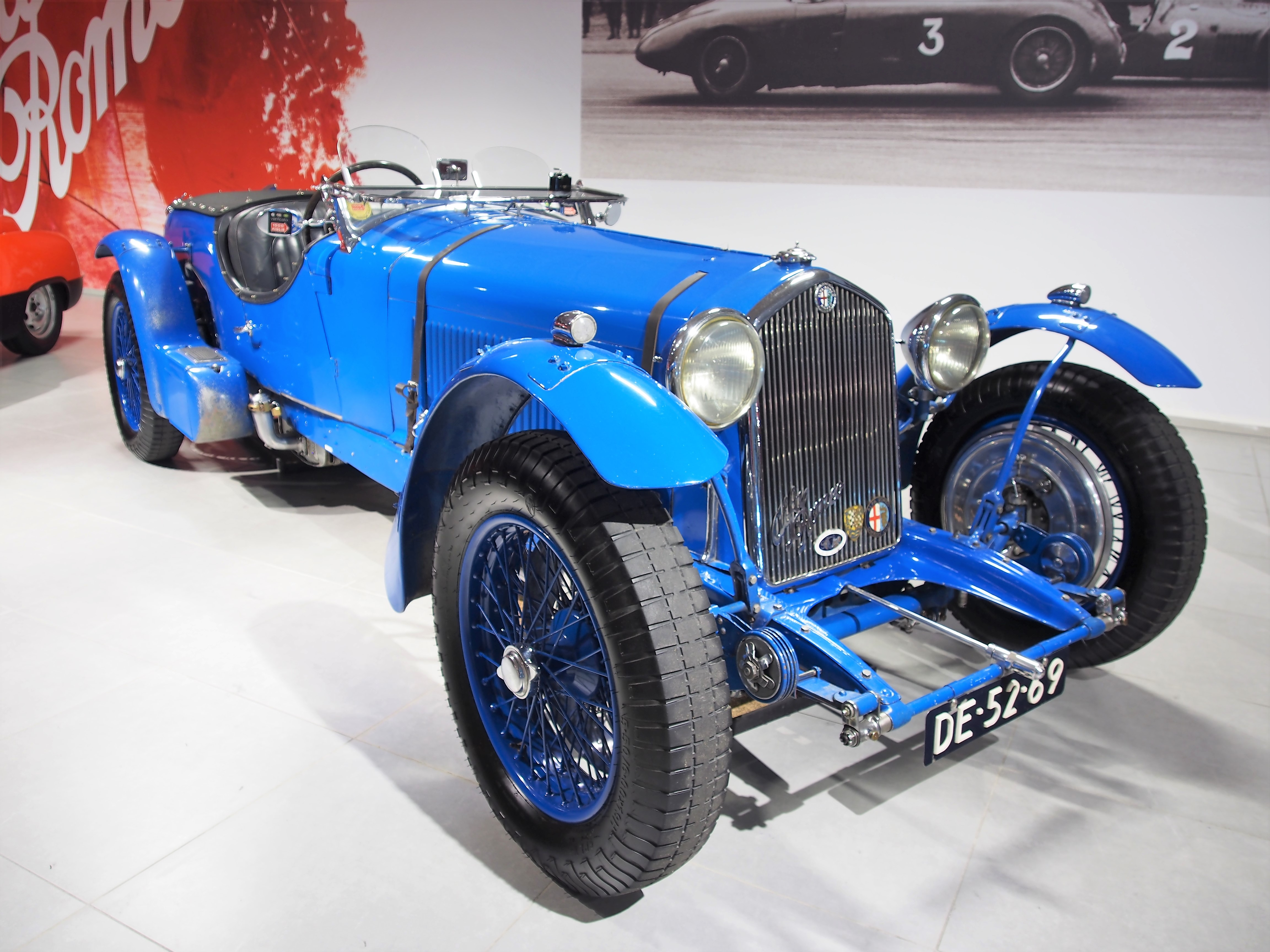
An Alfa Romeo 8C 2300 Le Mans Touring (1933) in Bleu de France livery

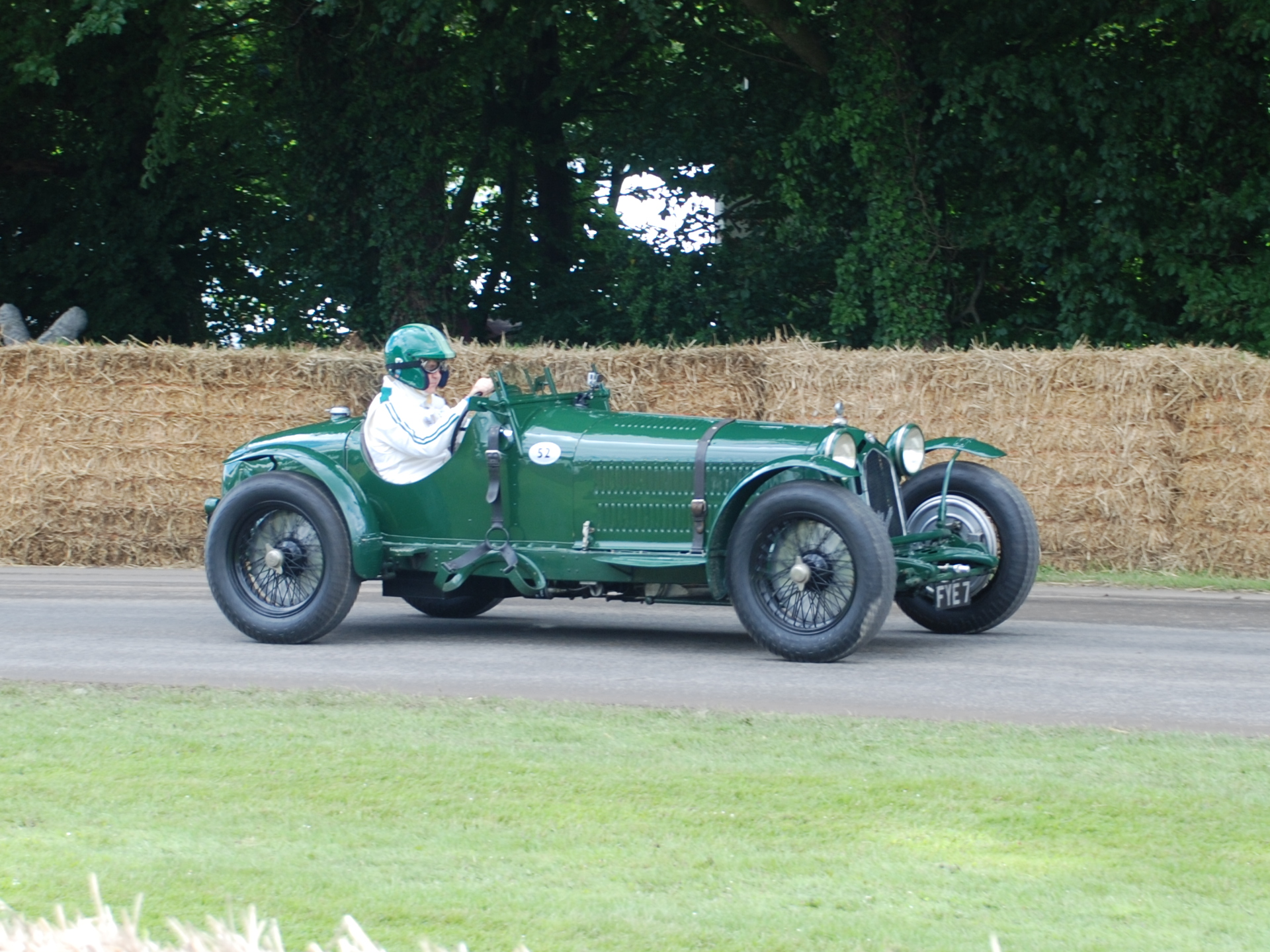
An Alfa Romeo 8C 2300 Monza (1931) in British racing green livery

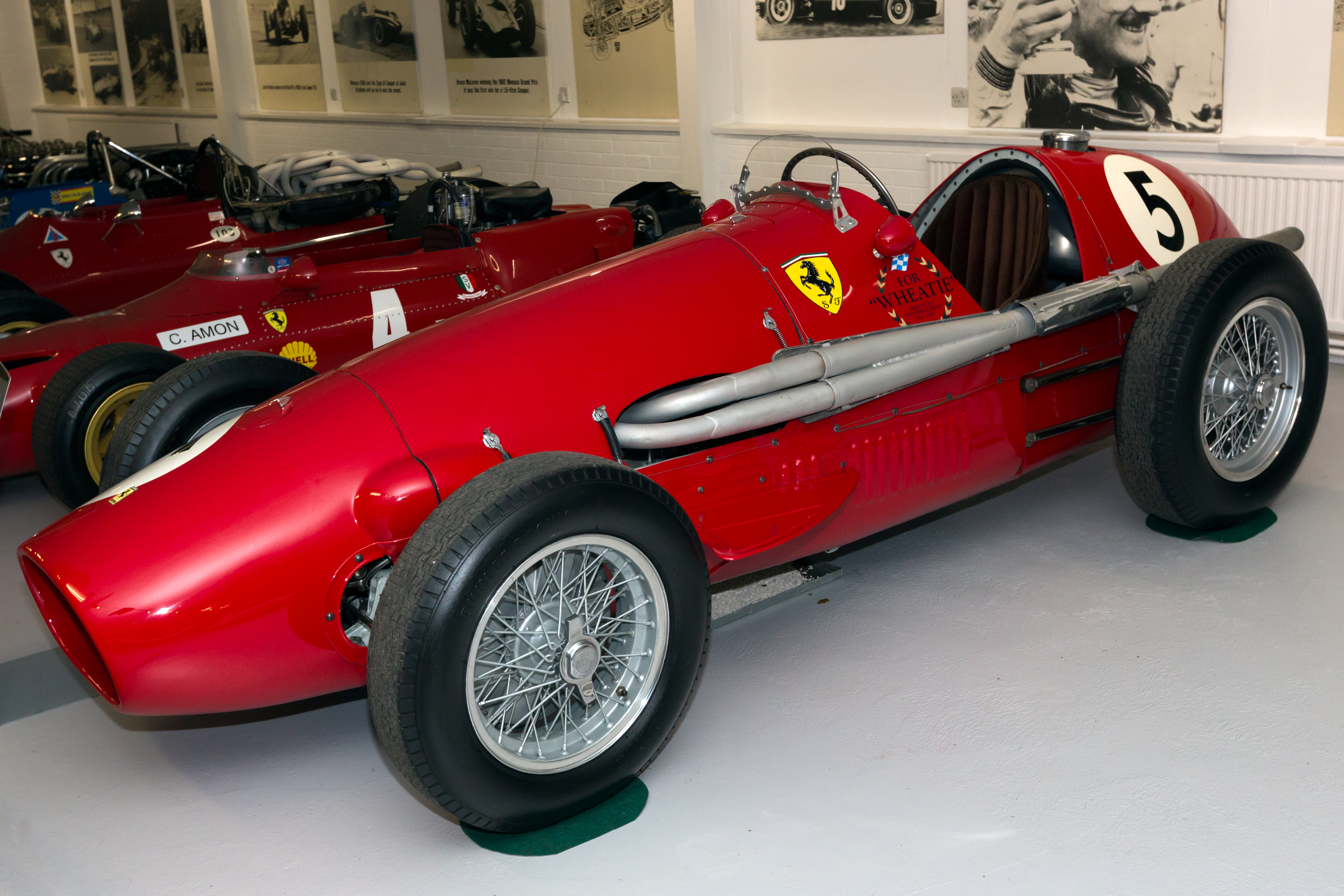
A Ferrari 500 F2 (1952-53) in Ferrari red

Specific variants of rosso corsa soon developed within the different Italian manufacturers: rosso Ferrari is defined in a lighter shade, while rosso Alfa, used by Alfa Romeo, assumes a darker tone—although the company from the Alfa Romeo Portello Plant has historically also been associated with green, as seen in the Biscione, the emblem featured in the Alfa Romeo logo, and particularly the green Alfa Romeo Quadrifoglio, which marks its sporting and competition models. Even more distinct are the rosso Montebello of Lancia, which is an oxblood shade and was later adorned with a thin yellow-and-blue stripe recalling the colours of the coat of arms of Turin, and the rosso Maserati, an oxblood tending toward brick red. The colour associated with a car was not determined by the country in which it was manufactured or by the nationality of the driver, but rather by the nationality of the racing team that entered it in competition. This is the reason why, particularly in the post-war period and specifically with Ferrari, cars bearing the Prancing Horse logo are remembered with liveries other than red: the light blue and yellow of the Argentine Juan Manuel Fangio at Monza in 1949, the white and red of the Swiss Espadon team for Rudolf Fischer, and the green of the British driver Peter Whitehead.

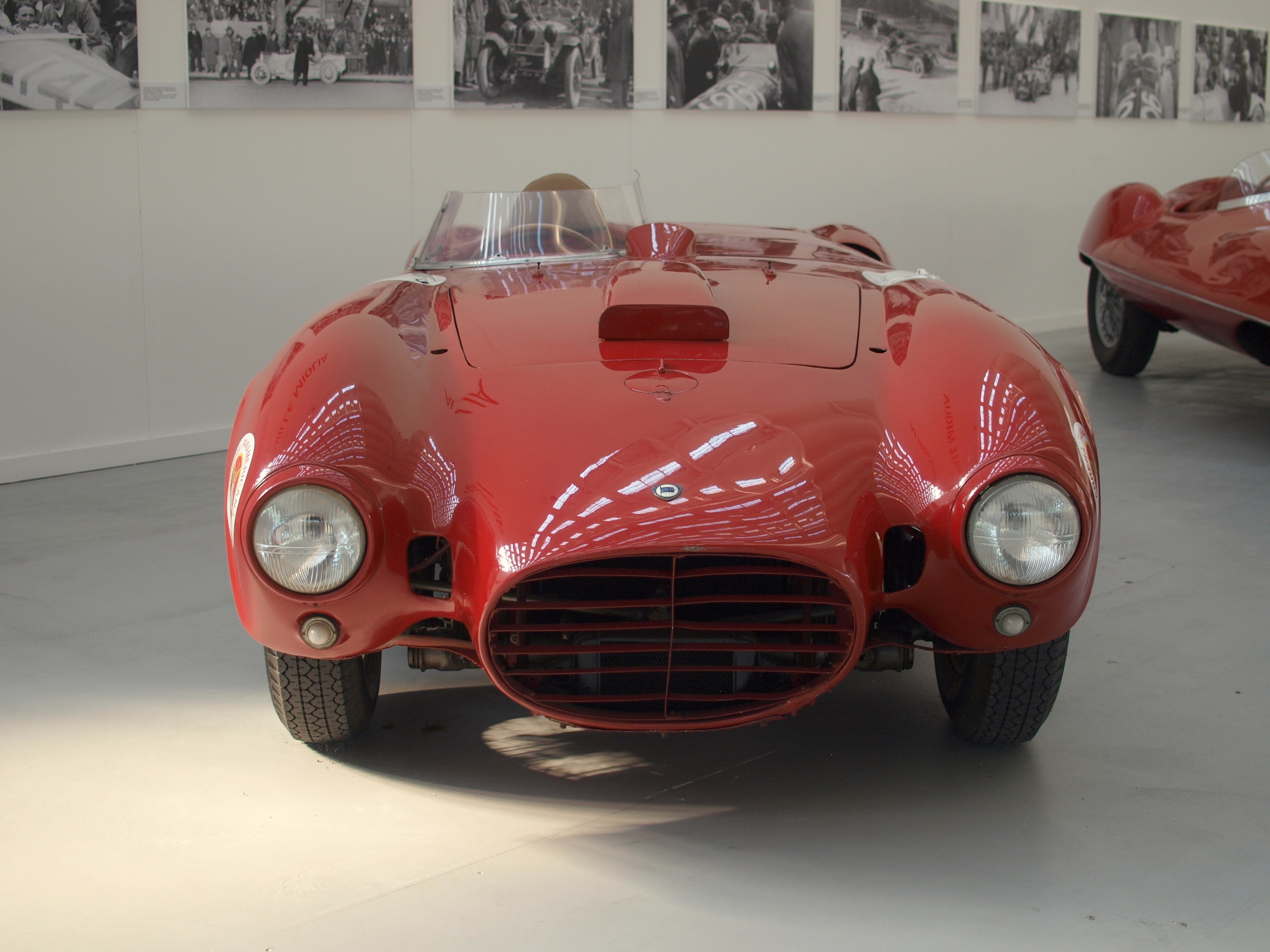
A Lancia D24 (1953) in Lancia's original Montebello red

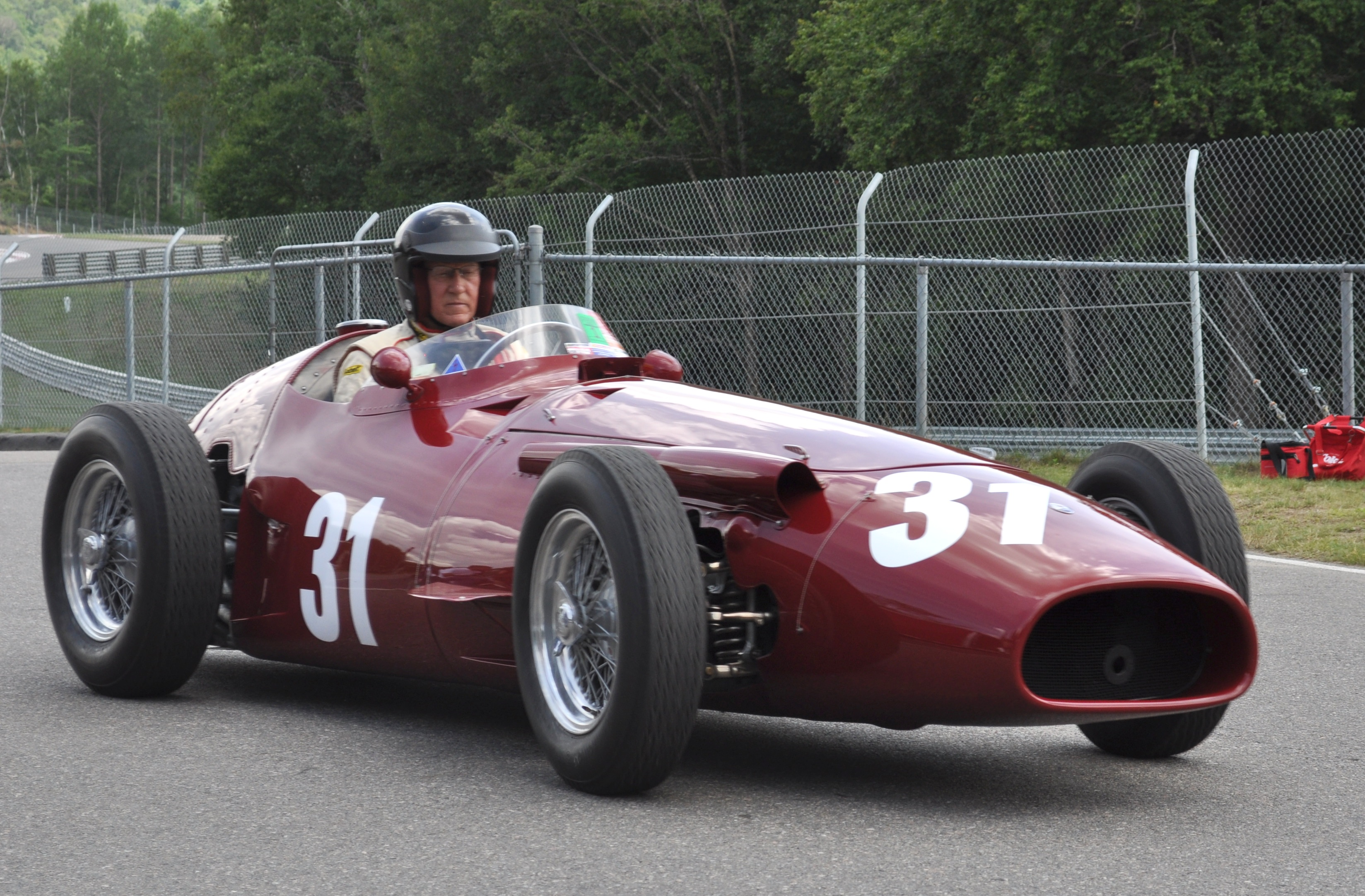
A Maserati 250F (1954-60) in Maserati red

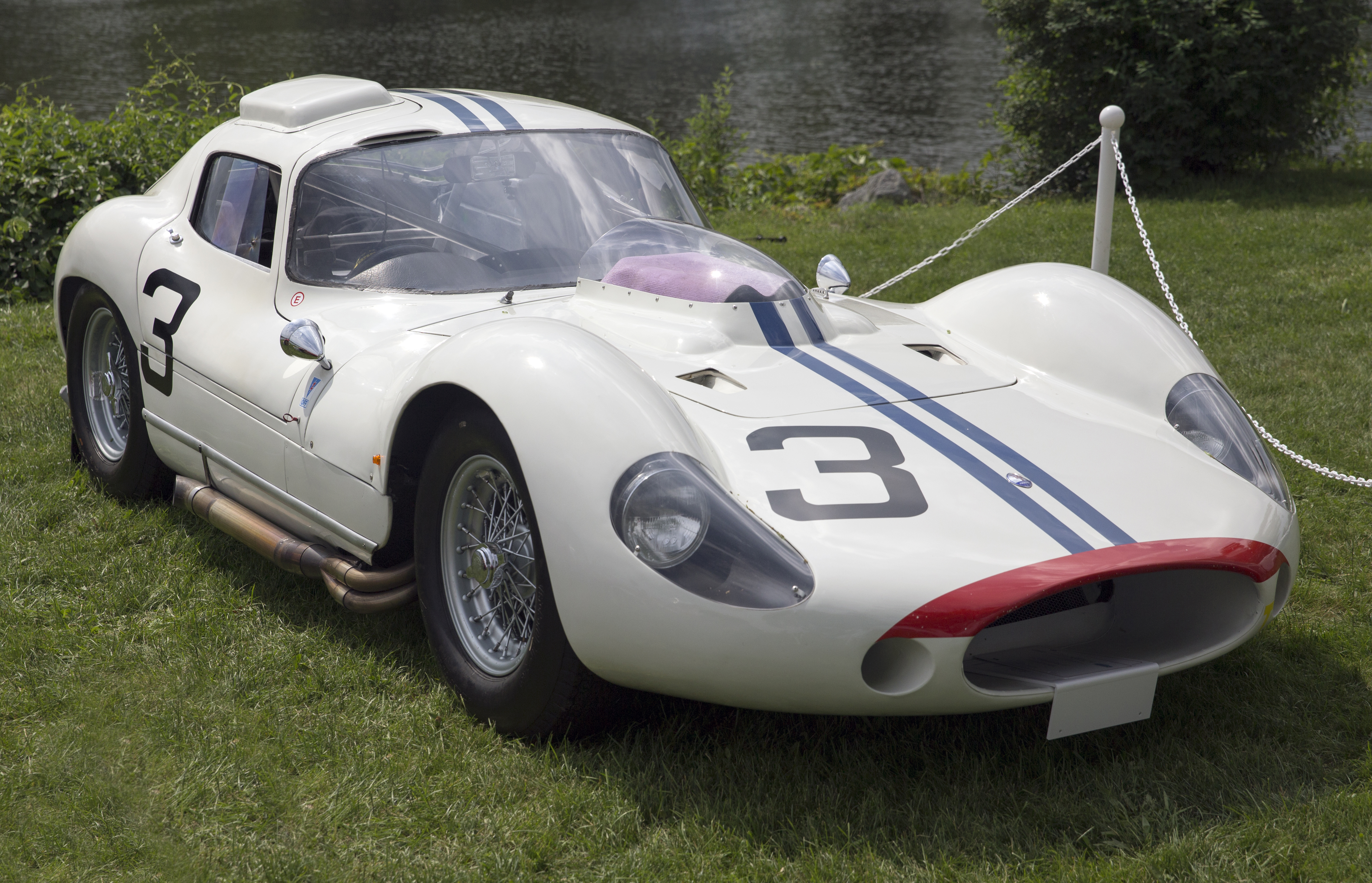
A Maserati Tipo 151 (1962) in US livery, white with blue racing stripes

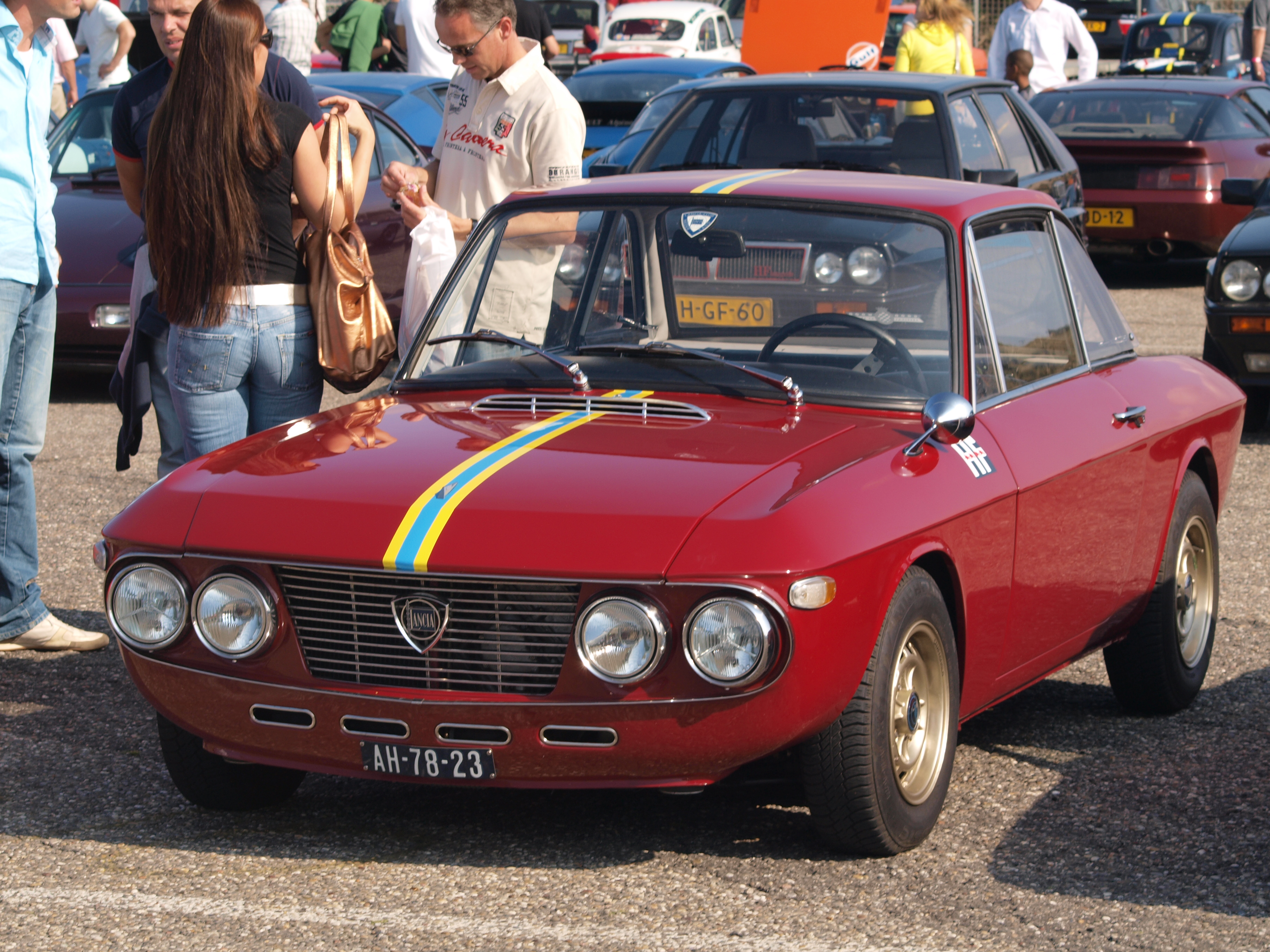
A Lancia Fulvia Coupé HF (1965), with the historic Montebello red updated with a Turin yellow and blue stripe.

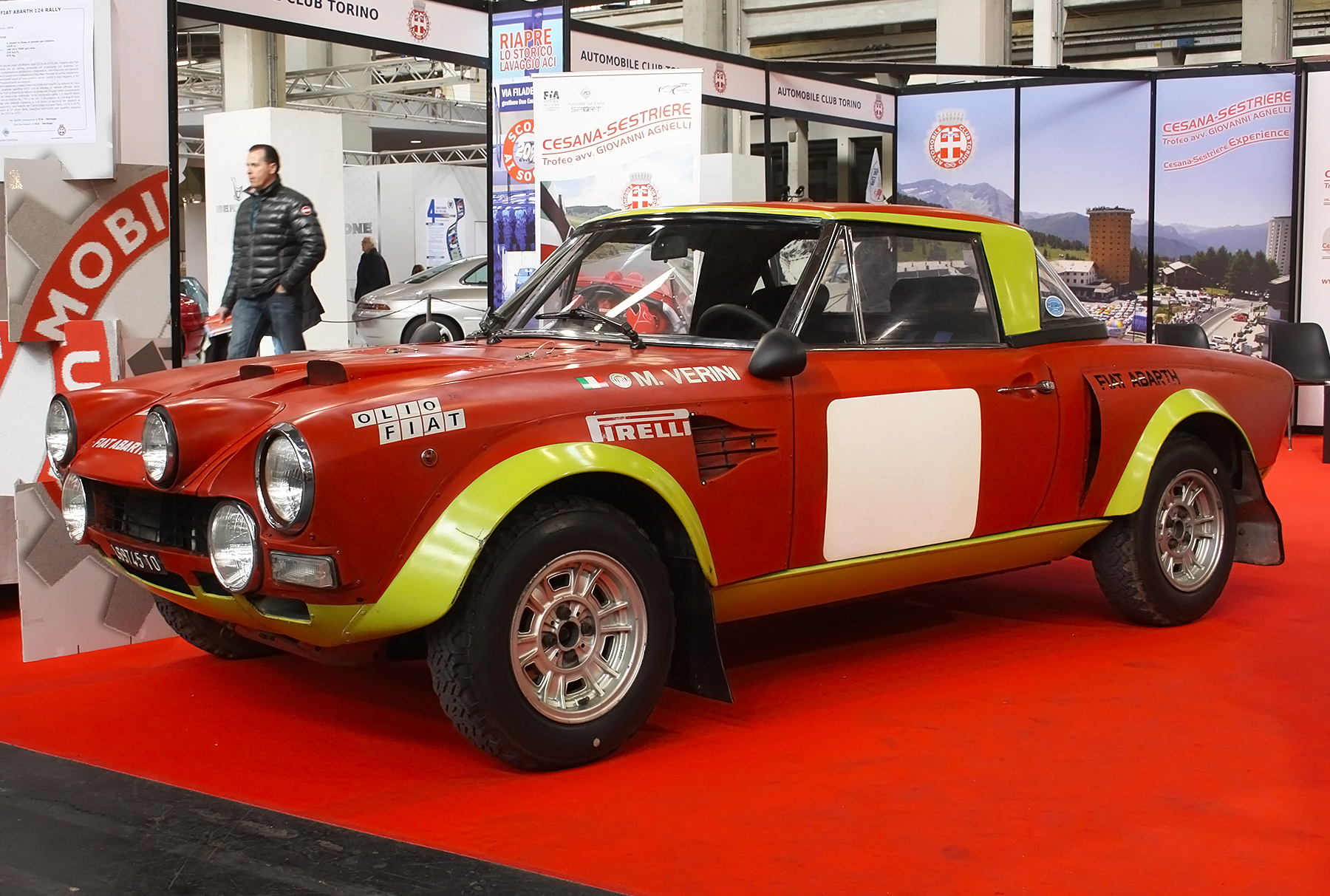
A Fiat 124 Abarth Rally (1972-75) in the yellow and red livery of the Abarth racing team.

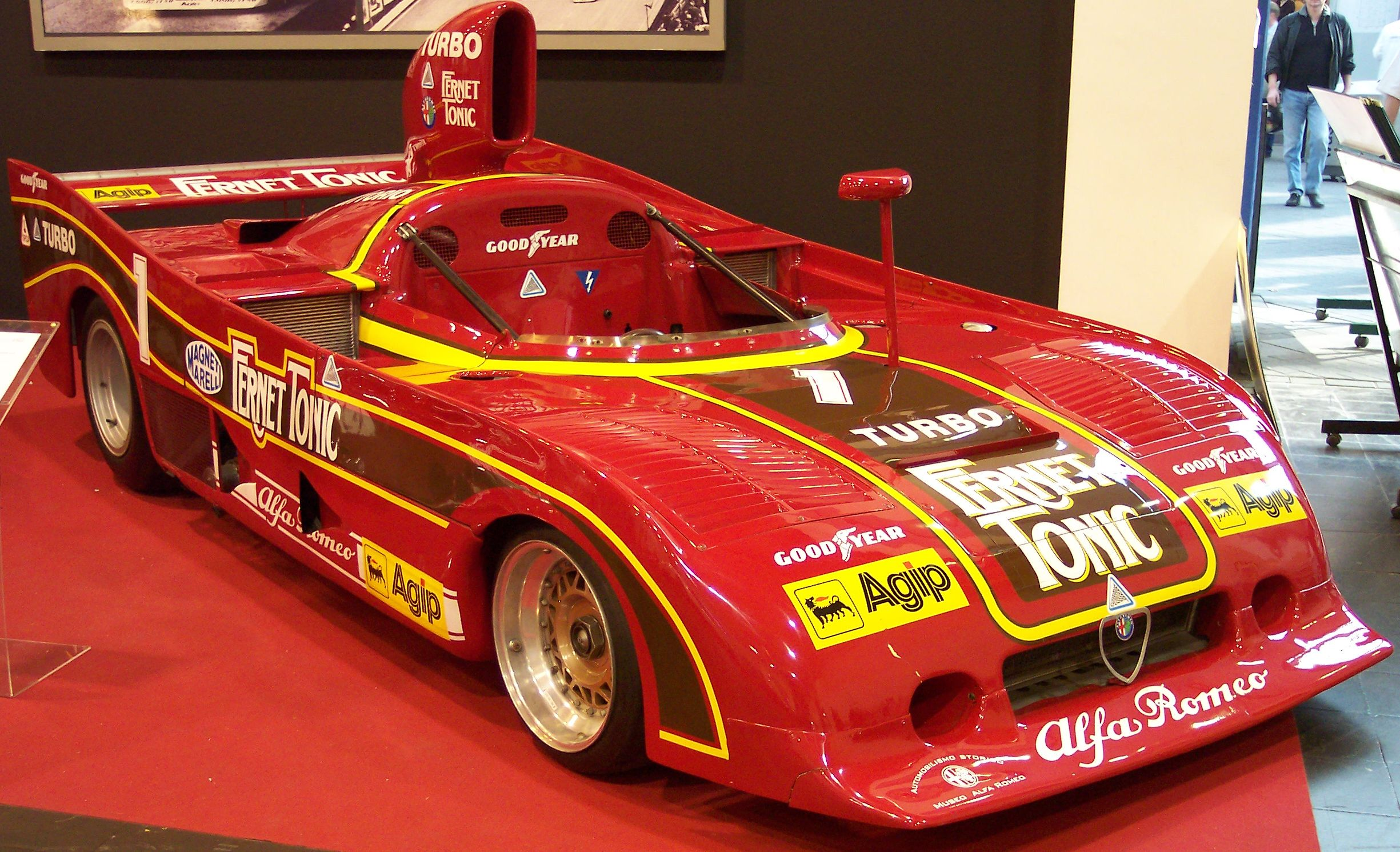
An Alfa Romeo Tipo 33 (1977), with the historic Alfa red combined with the new sponsors

Other exceptions include the Maserati 8CTF, which won the Indianapolis 500 in 1939 and 1940 for the American privateer Boyle team while retaining a metallized version of the house's characteristic maroon, and the debut of the Lancia D23 at the 1953 Gran Premio dell'Autodromo di Monza, where it was exceptionally painted in a light blue.

=== Formula One ===
In Formula One until the 1968 season the colour was determined by the nationality of the team entering the vehicle (and not by the country the car was made in nor by the nationality of the driver(s)), e.g. the Ferrari works team has always kept a red colour in the tradition of rosso corsa, the national racing colour of Italy, except for last two races in the 1964 season (the 1964 United States Grand Prix and 1964 Mexican Grand Prix) when Enzo Ferrari let his cars be entered by the NART team in American national racing colours (white and blue) to protest against Italian racing authorities. However, Ferrari cars entered by non-Italian privateer teams wore their respective national racing colours until the 1961 Belgian Grand Prix when Belgian driver Olivier Gendebien privately entered a Ferrari car painted in the Belgian racing yellow colour, scoring 4th behind three other Ferrari cars painted in red as they were entered by the Scuderia Ferrari works team itself, and driven by US drivers Phil Hill and Richie Ginther as well as German Wolfgang von Trips.

Ferrari won the 1964 World championship with John Surtees by competing the last two races (the United States Grand Prix and Mexican Grand Prix) in Ferrari 158 cars painted white and blue – the national colours of the teams licensed in the United States – as these were entered not by the Italian factory themselves but by the American NART team. This was done as a protest against the agreement between Ferrari and the Italian Racing Authorities regarding their planned mid-engined Ferrari race car. Since Ferrari cars entered in 1965 and 1969 seasons by the NART team and at the 1966 Italian Grand Prix by the British privateer Reg Parnell team kept wearing the red colour, the 1964 Mexican Grand Prix was the last time Ferrari cars wore other than the traditional red colour in Formula One.

National colours were mostly replaced in Formula One by commercial sponsor liveries in 1968, but unlike most other teams, Ferrari always kept the traditional red but the shade of the colour varied. From 1996 to 2007 Ferrari F1 cars were painted in a brighter, almost orange day-glo to adjust for colour balance on television screens. The original Rosso corsa may appear almost dark brown in older television sets. The Rosso corsa shade of red made a return on the F1 cars at the 2007 Monaco Grand Prix, possibly in line with the increasing market presence of higher quality high definition television. In 2020 Tuscan Grand Prix Ferrari cars were again painted in original Rosso corsa to commemorate Ferrari's 1000th race in the Formula 1 World Championship.

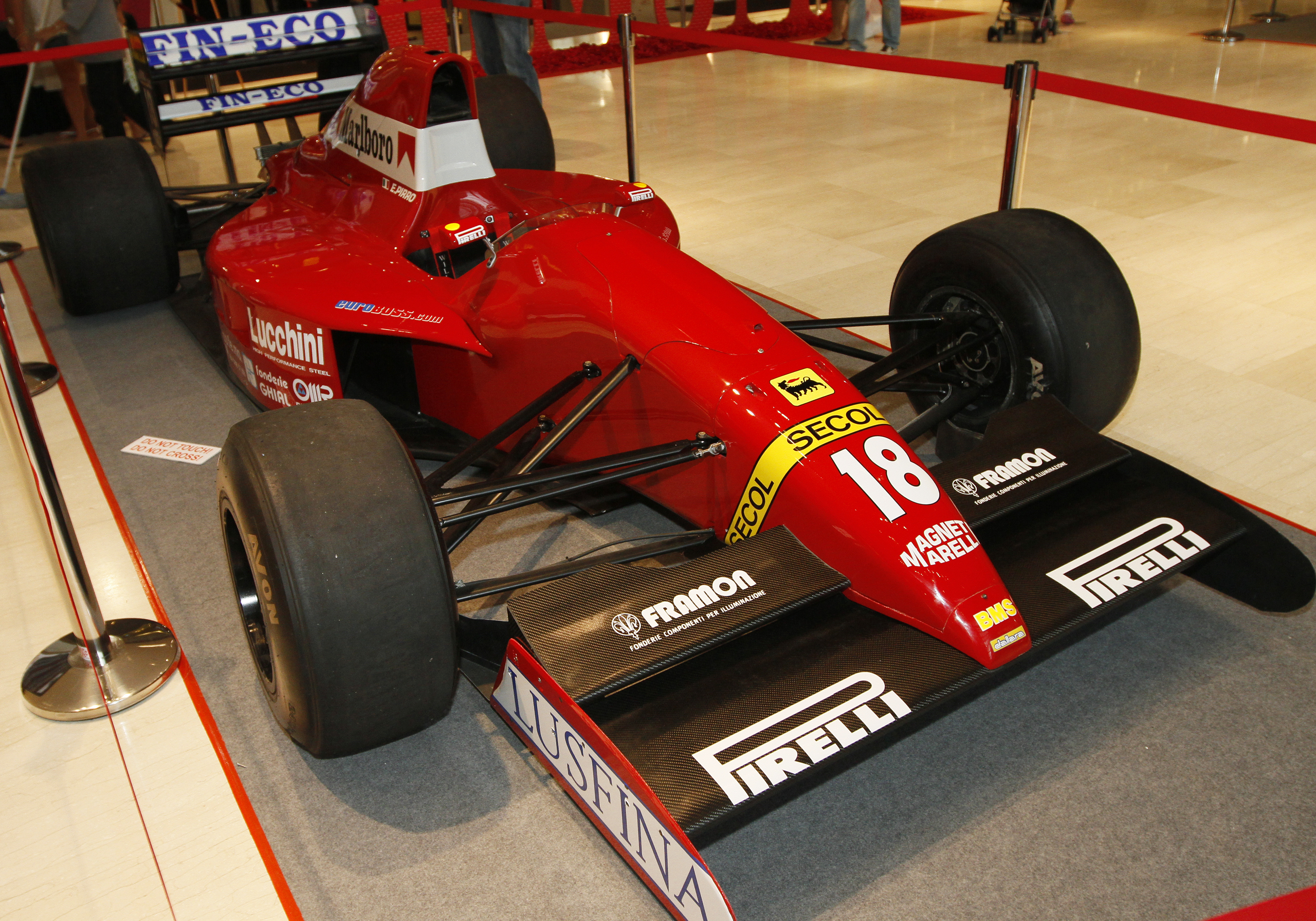
A Dallara 191 from Scuderia Italia (1991)

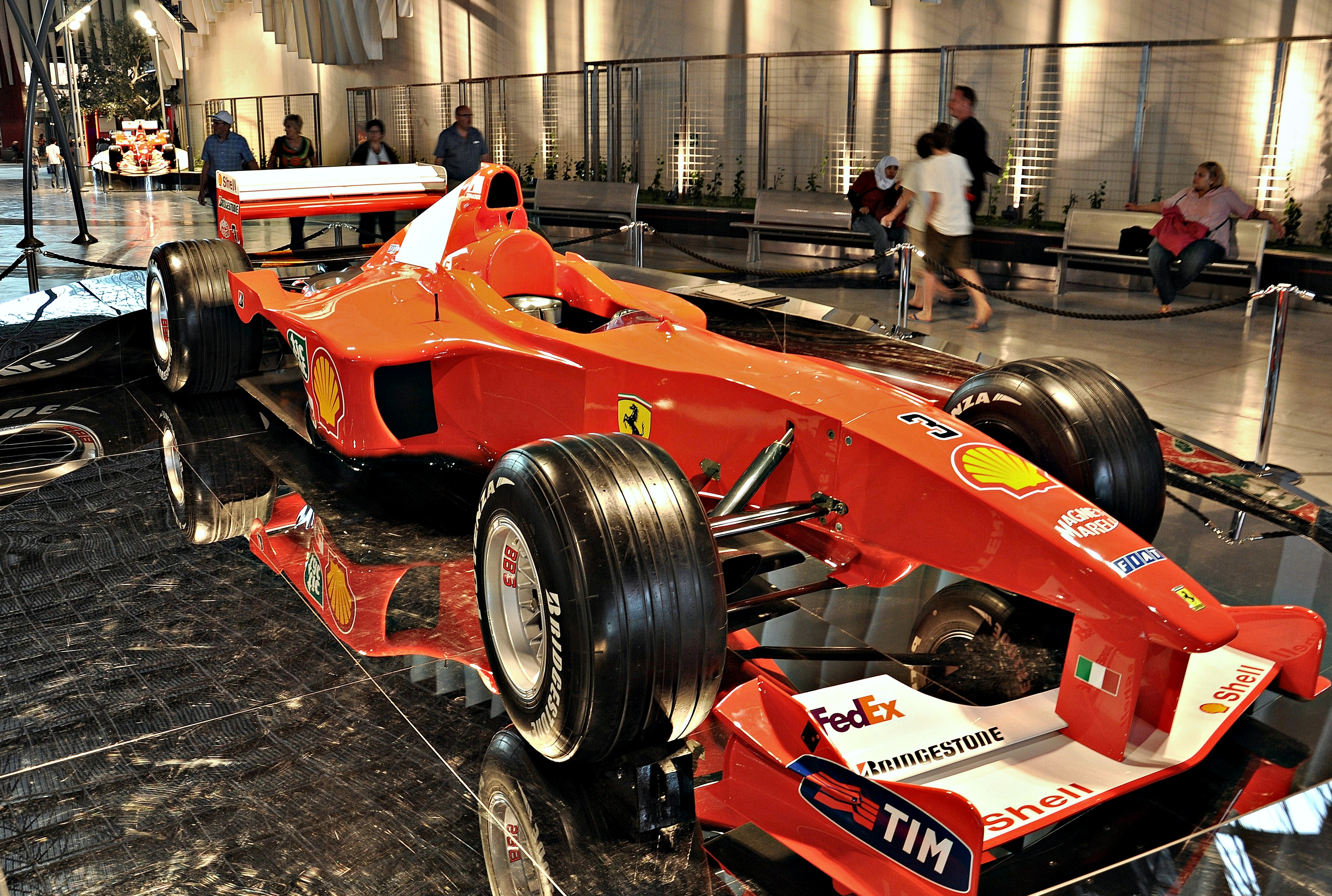
A Ferrari F1-2000 (2000)

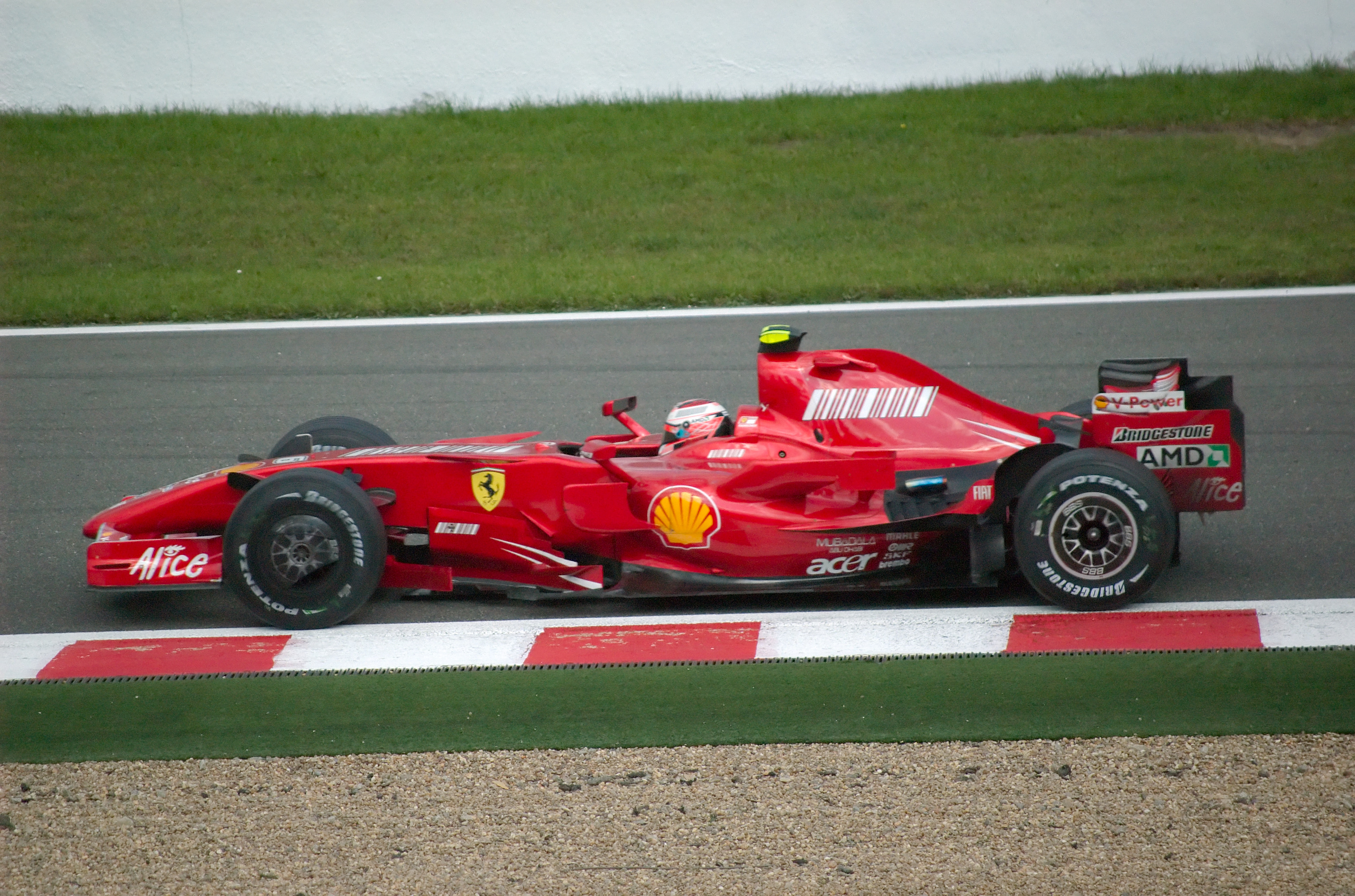
A Ferrari F2007 (2007) with a Ferrari red metallic finish

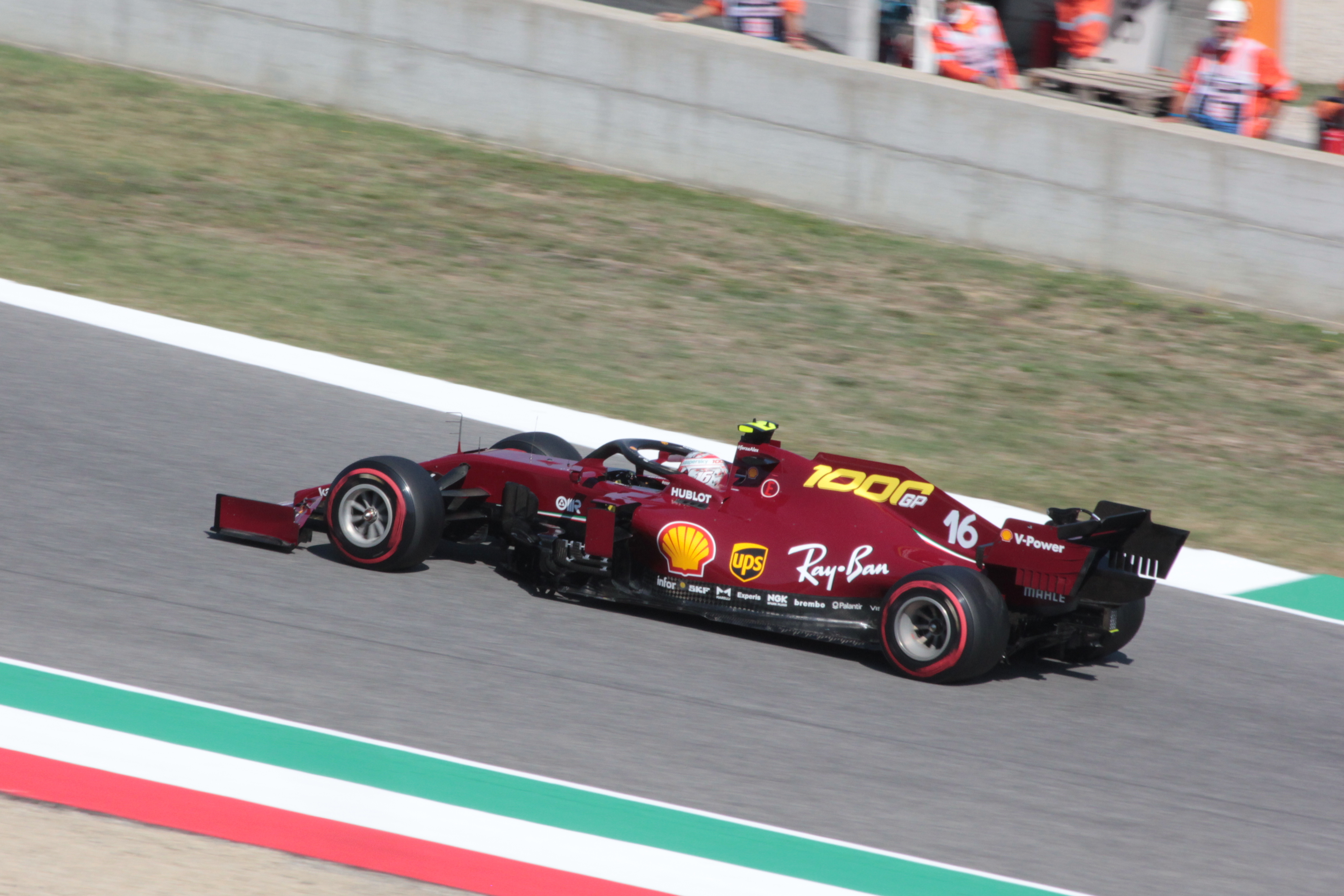
The Ferrari SF1000 in amaranth to celebrate the Ferrari 125 S (2020)

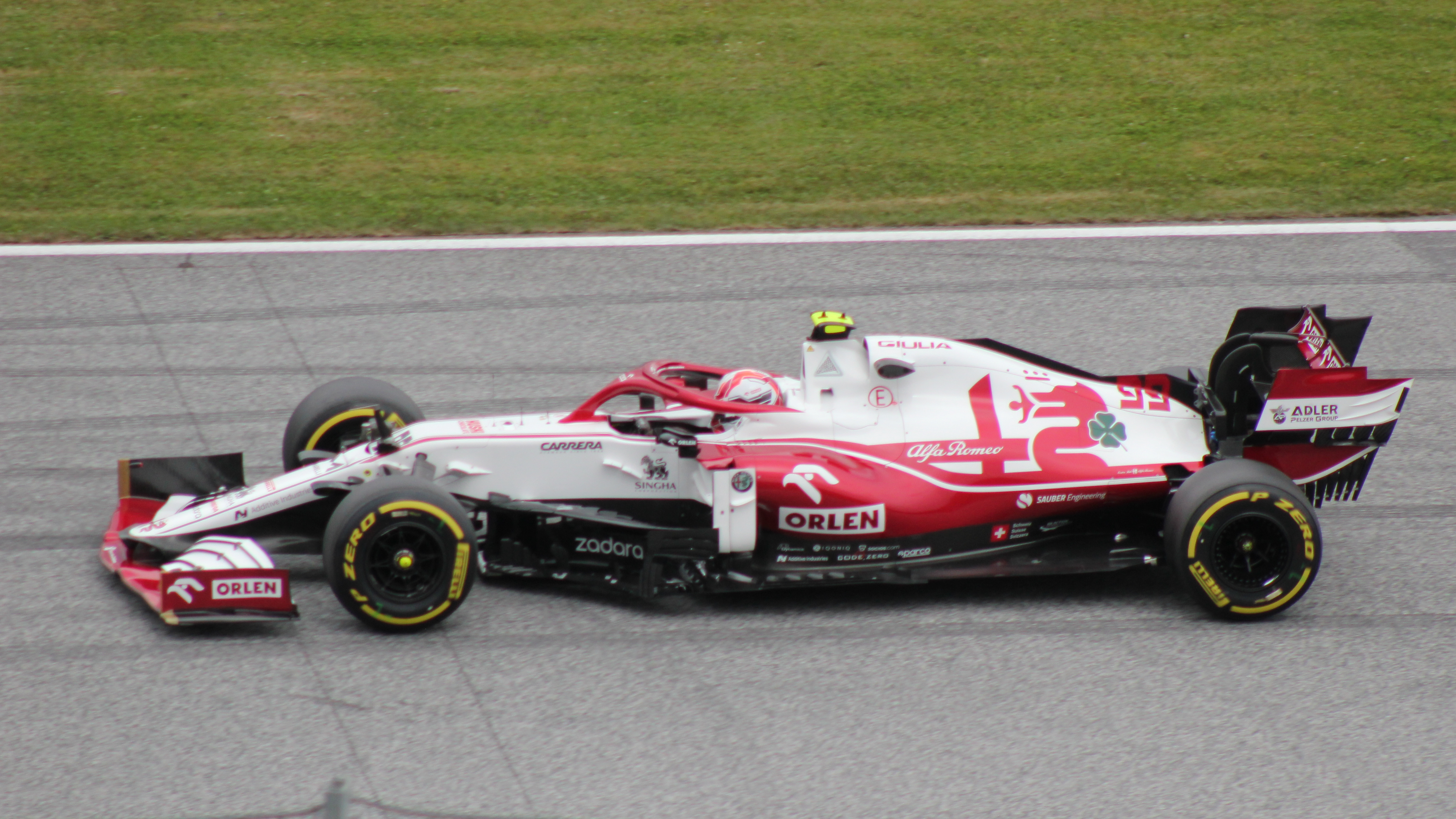
An Alfa Romeo Racing C41, with Alfa red combined with Swiss white (2021)

Italian motorcycle company Ducati also features this color as one of their main colors both in its racing motorcycles such as the Ducati Desmosedici and in its road bikes such as the Ducati Panigale V2. Red cars are also traditional in Alfa Romeo and Ferrari car running in other motorsport championships, such as Supertouring championships in the former and the 24 Hours of Le Mans and 24 Hours of Daytona in the latter. In contrast, since the 2000s Maserati has been using white and blue and Abarth has been using white with red flashes. Rosso Corsa is also an extremely popular colour choice for Ferrari road cars, nearly 80% of all Ferraris sold are in the colour. It is also worth noting the cases of the Italian Tecno team and the British Brabham team powered by Alfa Romeo in Formula One during the 1970s, as well as the Lancia Delta HF Integrale which won the Rallye Sanremo in 1989. In the latter case, the stripes of Martini Racing—another iconic livery in the history of motorsport—were combined with the traditional rosso corsa.

Starting with the 1997 season, with the Ferrari F310B, the rosso Ferrari changed tone for the first time in order to bring it closer to the corporate colour of its title sponsor, Marlboro. From that time onward, the Formula One cars from Maranello intended for competition have typically been painted in a brighter shade of red, tending toward orange, as this colour is reproduced by television cameras in a different tone, similar to the original rosso corsa, which is recognizable to all television viewers. However, throughout the history of the Cavallino Rampante, there have been occasional variations, such as the metallic red seen in the 2007 season on the Ferrari F2007, the dark red that characterized the Ferrari F138 in the 2013 season, or the matte red that was introduced in the 2019 season on the Ferrari SF90.

== Other sports ==
Over time, rosso corsa has extended beyond automotive racing into other areas of Italian sport. Due to its motorsport associations, the field most influenced has been motorcycle racing, where, from the 1980s onward, first Cagiva and especially Ducati adopted red as their primary colour. Ducati, in particular, has used this colour consistently for its official competition motorcycles since 1988, the inaugural year of the Superbike World Championship. Prior to that, no corporate colour restrictions existed, as evidenced by the silver livery in which Paul Smart won the 1972 Imola 200 and the tricolour livery in which Marco Lucchinelli won the 1987 Battle of the Twins at Daytona International Speedway. The principal exceptions to "Ducati red" have been the commemorative silver livery used by Troy Bayliss at the 2001 Imola Superbike round, marking the twentieth anniversary of Smart's 200 Miglia victory, and the yellow livery used by the two official MotoGP and Superbike teams during the races at the Misano World Circuit Marco Simoncelli in 2023, which paid homage to certain 1970s 750 models of Bruno Spaggiari as well as the Ducati 748 with which Paolo Casoli won the Supersport World Series 1997.

Outside the realm of motorsports—and unlike other Italian national teams, which traditionally adhere to azzurro—rosso corsa has found moderate application in Italy in the winter sports, specifically in disciplines inherently connected to speed. The Italy national bobsleigh team has historically used bobsleds with a red-painted shell, explicitly drawing inspiration from racing cars. Periodically, the Italy national alpine ski team has also worn red racing suits in place of the traditional azure.

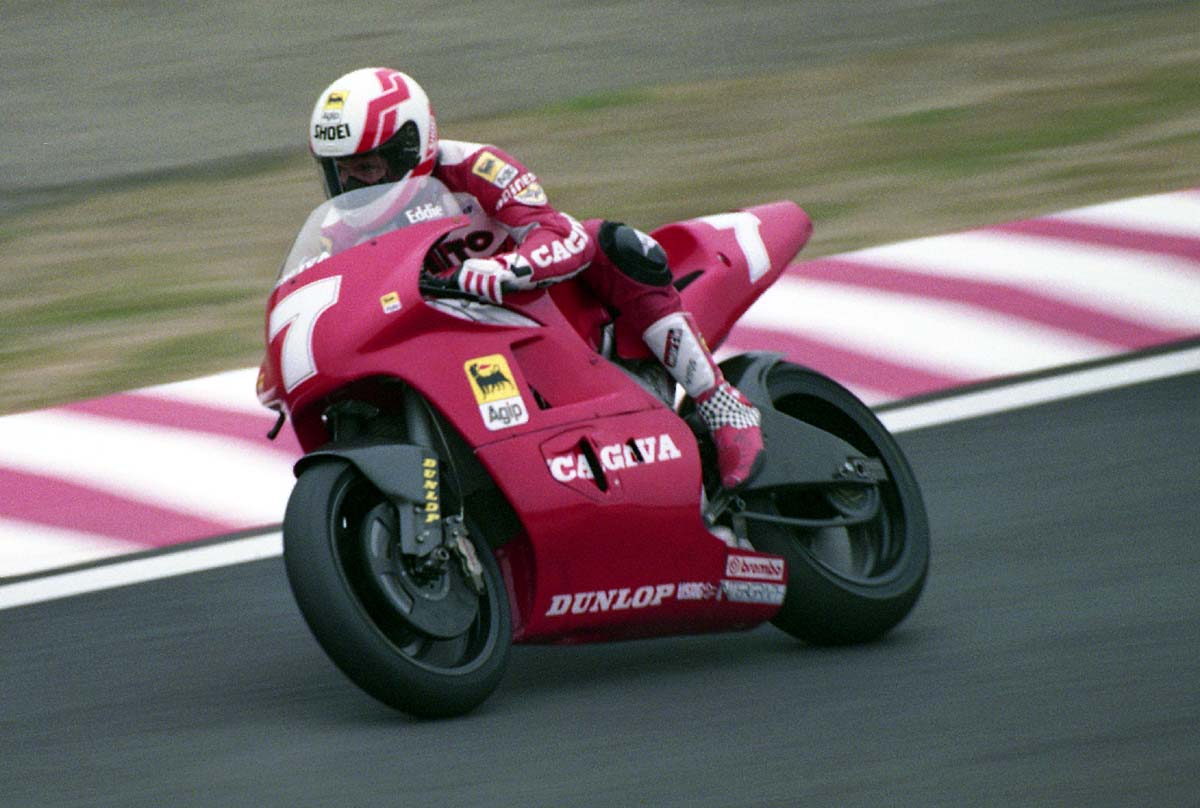
A Cagiva C592 (1992)

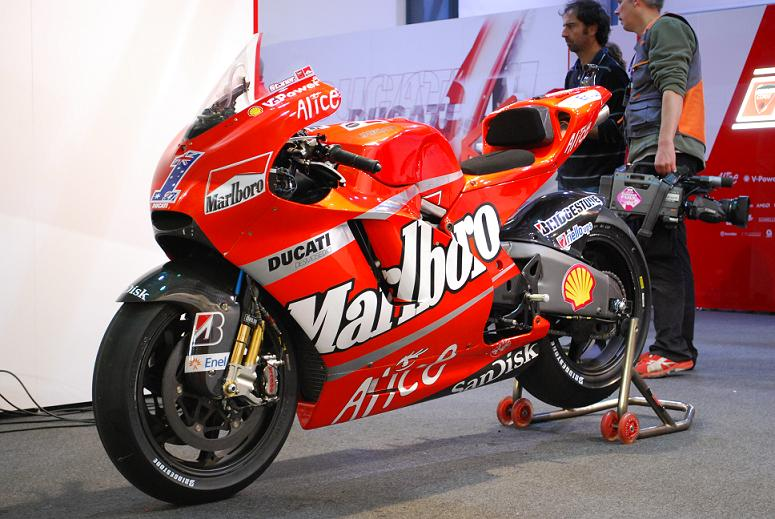
A Ducati Desmosedici (2008)

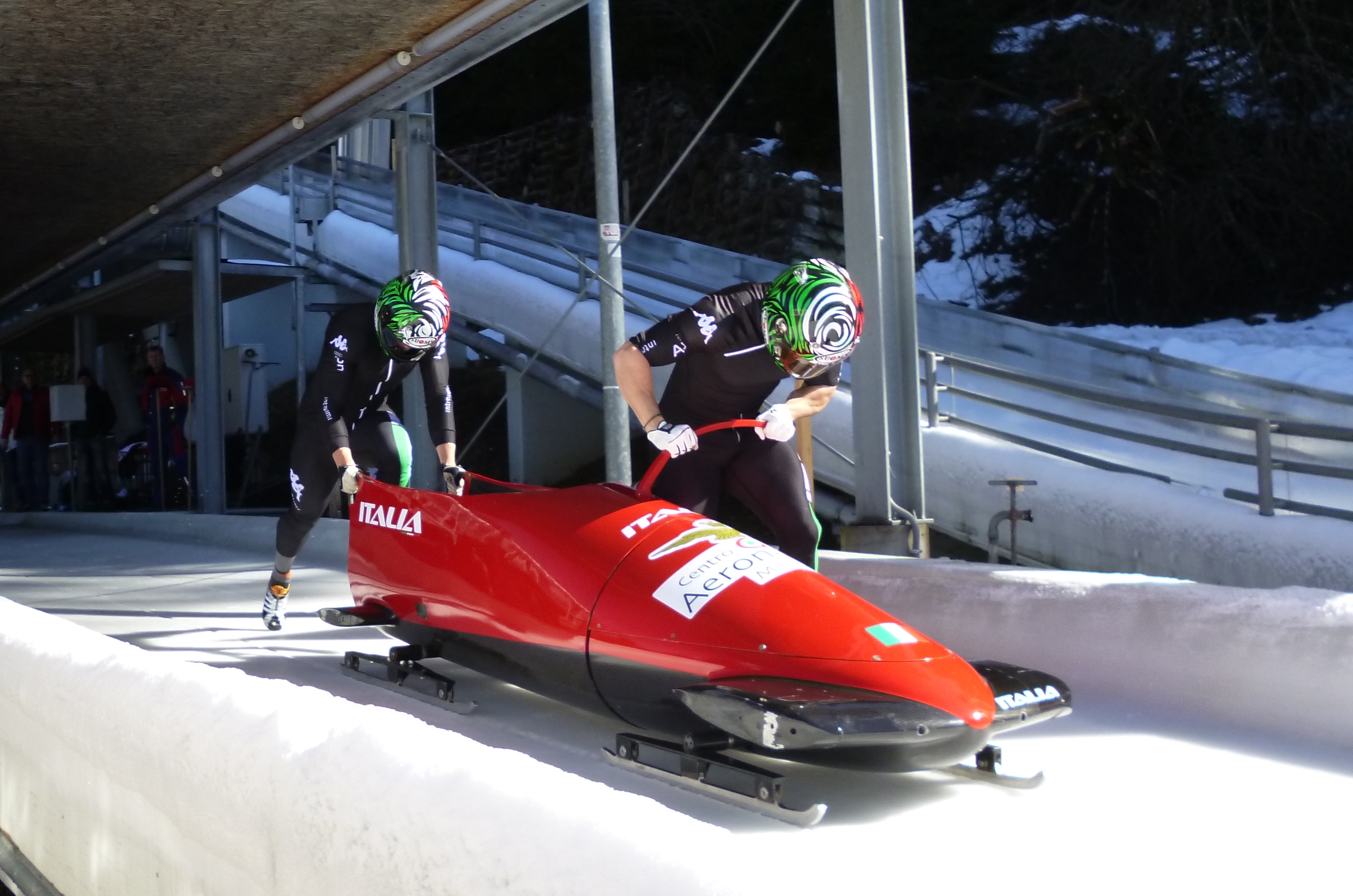
A bobsled of the Italian national team (2014)

== See also ==
- French racing blue
- National colours of Italy
- Silver Arrows
- Azzurro
- British racing green

== Bibliography ==
- Bengt Ahlbom; Roland Hentzel; Sven S. Lidman, eds. (1948). Sportens lille jätte (in Swedish). Stockholm: Natur & Kultur.
