= Robert Mircea =

Romanian-born Italian weightlifter and bobsledder (born 1999)

Personal information
- Full name: Robert Gino Mircea
- Nationality: Italian
- Born: 9 August 1999 (age 27) Constanța, Romania

Sport
- Country: Italy
- Sport: Bobsleigh
- Events: Two-man, Four-man

Robert Gino Mircea (born 9 August 1999) is a Romanian-born Italian bobsledder. He represented Italy at the 2022 and 2026 Winter Olympics.

== Career ==
Mircea was born in Romania. His family moved to Corbetta, Milan, Italy in 2009. Mircea began participating in weightlifting, and was twice national champion in the 96kg category for clean and jerk in 2020 and 2021. However, due to his status of being an immigrant and not yet having Italian citizenship, he was unable to compete internationally in weightlifting.

Mircea first started bobsledding in 2021 as a push athlete, and was quickly brought on to the Italy national bobsleigh team. With the assistance of the Italian Bobsleigh Federation, Mircea obtained Italian citizenship in January 2022, allowing him to compete as a bobsledder at the 2022 Winter Olympics. In his first Olympics as a bobsledder, he finished 21st in two-man as the pusher for Patrick Baumgartner, and 27th in four-man pushing for Mattia Variola. Mircea continued as a push athlete for Baumgartner in Bobsleigh World Cup competition. He has earned two medals in the World Cup - a silver medal at Yanqing in 2023 in four-man and a bronze medal at Innsbruck in four-man in 2025.

Mircea made his second Olympic appearance at the 2026 Winter Olympics, pushing for Baumgartner's team in both two-man and four-man. The team finished 7th in two-man and 5th in four-man.

== Bobsleigh results ==
All results are sourced from the International Bobsleigh and Skeleton Federation (IBSF).

=== Olympic Games ===
Event	Two-man	Four-man
(China) 2022 Beijing	21st	27th
(Italy) 2026 Milano Cortina	7th	5th

=== World Championships ===
Event	Two-man	Four-man
(Switzerland) 2023 St. Moritz	—	10th
(Germany) 2024 Winterberg	8th	7th
(United States) 2025 Lake Placid	13th	11th
