= Alessia Gatti =

Italian bobsledder (born 2002)

Alessia Gatti (born 2 July 2002 in Lecco, Italy) is an Italian bobsledder who competes as a brakewoman in the two-woman bobsleigh event. She represented Italy in international competitions and was selected for the Italian team at the 2026 Winter Olympics.

== Early life and education ==
Gatti was born in Lecco on 2 July 2002. During her youth she competed primarily in athletics, where she specialized in sprint events and also competed in hurdles. Her performances in athletics included several national-level titles with her club.

She later graduated with a degree in Biological Sciences.

== Sporting career ==
=== Transition to sliding sports ===
While competing in athletics, Gatti attracted the attention of technical staff from the Italian Winter Sports Federation, who recognized her explosive sprinting ability. She was invited to take part in talent tests in skeleton, a sliding sport that requires strong starting speed.

During the Olympic season she transitioned to bobsleigh and joined the Italian national bobsleigh program as a brakewoman, contributing her push-start speed to the team. She also became affiliated with the Italian military sports group Esercito.

=== International competitions ===
Within a short time after joining the sport, Gatti competed in the European Cup circuit, where she recorded several near-podium finishes. Her best result came in December 2025 when she finished fourth in the two-woman event in Winterberg with pilot Giada Andreutti.

She later made her Bobsleigh World Cup debut on the same track, finishing 20th. She was subsequently selected for the European Championships in St. Moritz, where the Italian team finished inside the top fifteen.

== 2026 Winter Olympics ==
In 2026, Gatti was selected as part of the Italian delegation for the two-woman bobsleigh event at the 2026 Winter Olympics, partnering with pilot Giada Andreutti.

The pair competed in the Olympic competition and finished 20th overall after four heats.

== Personal life ==
Outside of sport, Gatti enjoys music, watching television series, and boating.
