= Anna Costella =

Italian bobsledder (born 2002)

Anna Costella (born 30 July 2002) is an Italian bobsledder who competes as a brakewoman in the two-woman bobsleigh event. She represented Italy at the 2026 Winter Olympics in Milan–Cortina.

== Early life ==
Costella was born on 30 July 2002 in Sacile, in the province of Pordenone, Italy. Before entering bobsleigh, she competed in athletics, specializing in the long jump, where she recorded a personal best of 6.12 metres in 2021.

In December 2022 she was recruited through a talent-identification program organized by the Italian Winter Sports Federation, which tested athletes in pushing simulations for bobsleigh in Vipiteno.After passing the selections, she joined the Italian national bobsleigh team as a brakewoman.

== Career ==
Costella competed in junior and continental competitions during the early part of her bobsleigh career. At the 2024 European Under-23 Championships in Innsbruck, she finished sixth in the two-woman event.

In November 2025, she achieved a notable result in the European Cup, finishing second in the two-woman race at Lillehammer together with teammate Giada Andreutti.

Costella was later selected as part of the Italian team for the 2026 Winter Olympics in Milan–Cortina. She competed in the two-woman bobsleigh event with pilot Simona de Silvestro, finishing 23rd overall.

== Personal life ==
Costella attended a scientific high school and later enrolled in a bachelor's degree program in Nutrition Sciences at the University of Urbino. Outside sport, she enjoys reading, skiing, and trekking.
