= Nadezhda Orlova =

Russian bobsledder

Personal information
- Nationality: Russian
- Born: 25 September 1979 (age 45); Saint Petersburg, Russia

Sport
- Sport: Bobsleigh

Nadezhda Orlova (born 25 September 1979) is a Russian bobsledder. She competed in the two woman event at the 2006 Winter Olympics.
