= Cora Huber =

Swiss bobsledder (born 1981)

Personal information
- Nationality: Swiss
- Born: 8 April 1981 (age 43); Cham, Switzerland

Sport
- Sport: Bobsleigh

Cora Huber (born 8 April 1981) is a Swiss bobsledder. She competed in the two woman event at the 2006 Winter Olympics.
