= Vittorio Folonari =

Italian bobsledder (1915–2010)

Vittorit Folonari (24 September 1915 – 1 September 2010) was an Italian bobsledder who competed in the late 1940s and early 1950s. Competing in two Winter Olympics, he earned his best finish of 11th in the four-man event at St. Moritz in 1948.
