= Sisto Gillarduzzi =

Italian bobsledder and alpine skier (1908–1989)

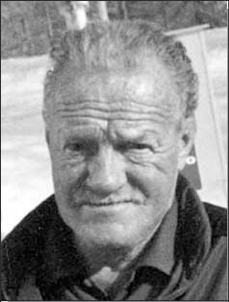

Personal information
- Nationality: Italian
- Born: 6 September 1908 Cortina d'Ampezzo, Italy
- Died: 29 November 1989 (aged 81) Cortina d'Ampezzo, Italy

Sport
- Country: Italy
- Sport: Bobsleigh; Alpine skiing
- Club: Bob Club Cortina
Medal record
Bobsleigh
World Championships
Silver medal – second place	1937 Cortina d'Ampezzo	Two-man

Sisto Gillarduzzi (6 September 1908 – 29 November 1989) was a bobsledder and an alpine ski racer from Italy who won a silver medal in the bobsleigh at the FIBT World Championships (1937) and participated in the alpine skiing to one edition of the Alpine World Ski Championships (1933).

== A family of bobsledders ==
Brother of five other bobsledders, as him from Cortina d'Ampezzo: Antonio, Guido, Pietro, and Uberto.

== Achievements ==
Year	Competition	Venue	Rank	Event	Notes
Bobsleigh
1937	World Championships	(Italy) Cortina D'Ampezzo	2nd	Two man	

== Alpine Ski ==
=== World Championships results ===
Year	Age	Slalom	Downhill	Combined
1933	25	10	35	24

=== National titles ===
- Italian Alpine Ski Championships
  - Downhill: 1933
