= Bertāns =

Bertāns (feminine: Bertāne) is a Latgalian language surname. Notable people with the surname include:

- Dairis Bertāns (born 1989), Latvian basketball player
- Dāvis Bertāns (born 1992), Latvian basketball player
