= Stefano Ticci =

Italian bobsledder (born 1962)

Olympic medal record

Bobsleigh
Bronze medal – third place	1994 Lillehammer	Two-man

Stefano Ticci (born 13 May 1962) is an Italian bobsledder who competed in the early 1990s. Competing in four Winter Olympics, he won a bronze medal in the two-man event at Lillehammer in 1994.

Stefano is also the cousin of world-renowned journalist Alberto Riva.
