= Suzanne Gavine-Hlady =

Canadian bobsledder (born 1975)

Suzanne Gavine-Francis-Hlady (born April 23, 1975, in Barrie, Ontario) is a Canadian bobsledder who has competed since 2001.

Gavine-Hlady finished 94th in the two-woman event at the 2006 Winter Olympics in Turin. She also finished 17th in the two-woman event at the 2005 FIBT World Championships in Calgary. Prior to going into bobsleigh, Gavine-Hlady competed in track and field as a shot putter. Gavine-Hlady also was awarded the track and field award for most improved coach.

Gavine-Hlady resides in Belle River, Ontario and works at Belle River District High School, where she teaches French, science and coaches jumpers.
