= Jennifer Isacco =

Italian bobsledder

Personal information
- Born: 27 February 1977 (age 49) Como, Lombardy, Italy

Sport
- Country: Italy
- Sport: Bobsleigh
Medal record
Olympic Games
Bronze medal – third place	2006 Turin	Two-woman
European Championships
Silver medal – second place	2006 St. Moritz	Two-woman

Jennifer Isacco (born 27 February 1977) is an Italian bobsledder who has competed since 1999. At the 2006 Winter Olympics in Turin, she won a bronze medal in the two-woman event with teammate Gerda Weissensteiner.
