= Fabiana Mollica =

Italian bobsledder

Personal information
- Born: 25 December 1983 (age 42) Verbania, Italy

Sport
- Country: Italy
- Sport: Bobsleigh
Medal record
European Championships
Bronze medal – third place	2007 Cortina d'Ampezzo	Two-woman

Fabiana Mollica (born 25 December 1983) is an Italian former bobsledder. She competed in the two woman event at the 2006 Winter Olympics.
