= Thomas Rottensteiner =

Italian bobsledder (born 1963)

Personal information
- Nationality: Italian
- Born: 15 March 1963 (age 62); Bolzano, Italy

Sport
- Sport: Bobsleigh

Thomas Rottensteiner (born 15 March 1963) is an Italian bobsledder. He competed at the 1988 Winter Olympics and the 1992 Winter Olympics.
