= Eline Jurg =

Dutch bobsledder

Personal information
- Nationality: Dutch
- Born: May 30, 1973 (age 51); Rotterdam, Netherlands

Sport
- Sport: Bobsled

Eline Jurg (born 30 May 1973 in Rotterdam) is a Dutch bobsledder who has competed since 1996. Competed in two Winter Olympics, she earned her best finish of sixth in the two-woman event at Salt Lake City in 2002.

She drove in two-woman with Christel Bertens. Jurg and Bertens appeared on their first Olympics at the 2002 Winter Olympics in Salt Lake City. They were named among the possible surprise medalists, but were unable to reach this effort, finishing sixth.

Jurg finished ninth in the two-woman run at the 2005 FIBT World Championships in Calgary, making her eligible for the 2006 Winter Olympics in Turin. At a qualifying run-off in Oberhof, Germany, four competitors fought for two seats behind drivers Jurg and Ilse Broeders. Bertens finished fourth while Jeannette Pennings would be teamed with driver Broeders. Bertens was replaced by Kitty van Haperen with Urta Rozenstruik, Jurg's back-up runner, was named in reserve in case anything happened to either Pennings or Van Haperen. At the Winter Olympics, Broeders/Pennings started off first, but crashed in the first run, later withdrawing from the event. The Jurg/Van Haperen witnessed the crash of their teammates, resulting in a disappointing 11th-place finish.

Jurg also finished tenth in the two-woman event at the 2007 FIBT World Championships in St. Moritz.
