= Dario Poggi =

Italian bobsledder (1909–1977)

Personal information
- Nationality: Italian
- Born: 13 May 1909; Milan, Kingdom of Italy
- Died: 9 December 1977 (aged 68); Milan, Italy

Sport
- Sport: Bobsleigh

Dario Poggi (13 May 1909 – 9 December 1977) was an Italian bobsledder who competed from the late 1930s to the early 1950s. Competing in three Winter Olympics, he earned his best finish of sixth in the two-man event at St. Moritz in 1948.
