= Andrea Meneghin (bobsleigh) =

Italian bobsledder (born 1958)

Personal information
- Nationality: Italian
- Born: 8 August 1958 (age 66); Conegliano, Italy

Sport
- Sport: Bobsleigh

Andrea Meneghin (born 8 August 1958) is an Italian bobsledder. He competed at the 1984 Winter Olympics and the 1988 Winter Olympics.
