= Giada Andreutti =

Italian athlete and bobsledder (born 1995)

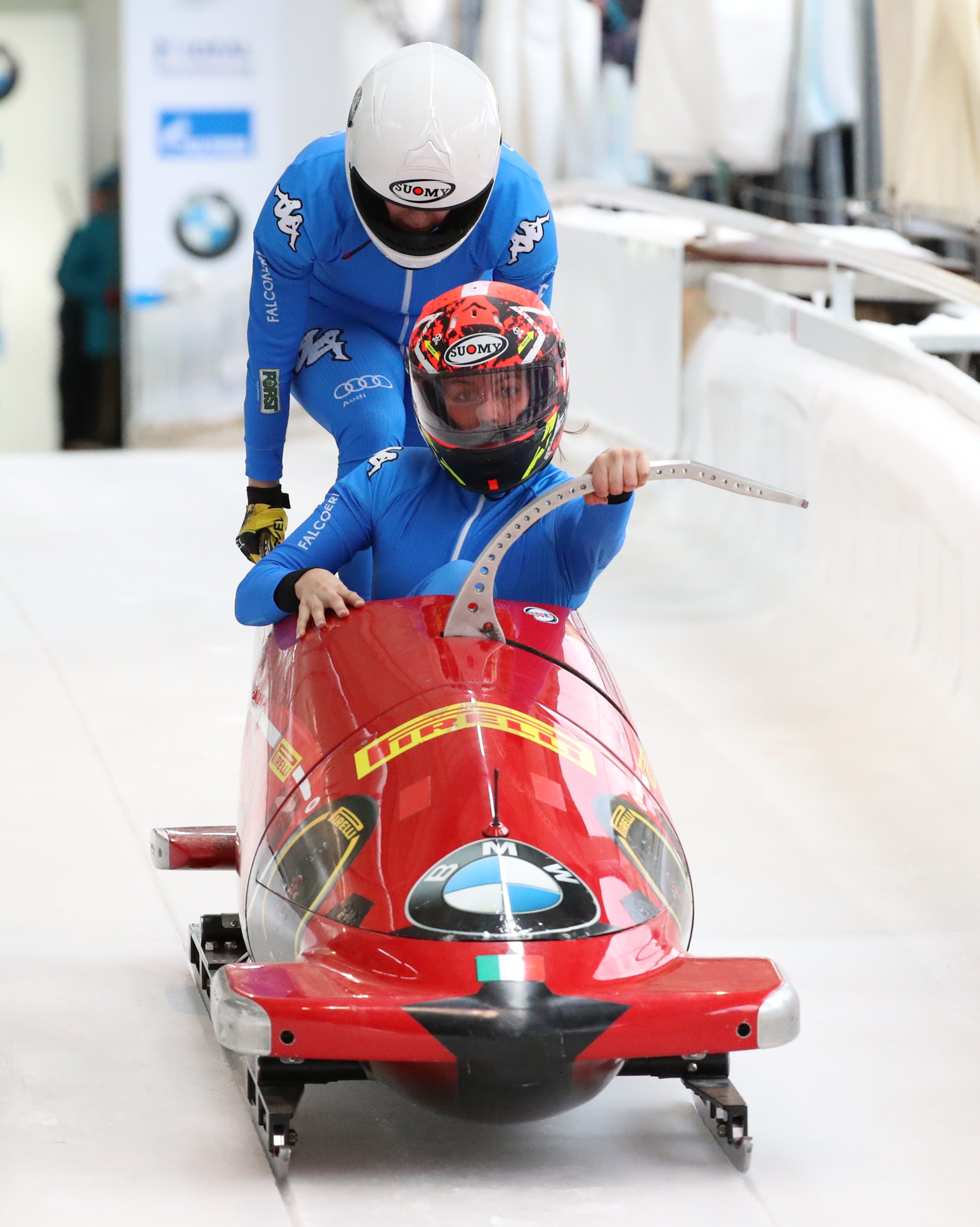
- Andreutti competing at the IBSF World Championships 2020.

Personal information
- Nationality: Italian
- Born: 16 February 1995 (age 31) San Daniele del Friuli, Italy

Sport
- Country: Italy
- Sport: Athletics, Bobsleigh
- Events: Discus throw (athletics), Monobob, Two-woman (bobsleigh)
- Club: Aeronautica

Giada Andreutti (born 16 February 1995) is an Italian athlete and bobsledder. She represented Italy at the 2022 and 2026 Winter Olympics.

== Career ==
=== Athletics ===
Andreutti began her sports career in athletics, specializing in discus throw. She found success, earning multiple national medals at the junior level. In 2018, she earned a gold medal at the senior level at the Italian Winter Throwing championships. She competed at the 2019 Summer Universiade in discus throw, where she finished 11th.

=== Bobsleigh ===
Andreutti began competing in bobsleigh in 2018, making her debut at Lillehammer. In 2019 she was named to be part of the Italy national bobsleigh team. In 2023, she won a Europe Cup event in monobob at the Sigulda track, marking her first win in bobsleigh competition.

Andreutti has represented Italy in the Olympics twice. In the 2022 Winter Olympics, she participated in the monobob event, where she finished 15th. At the 2026 Winter Olympics, she participated in both monobob and the two-woman. She finished 24th in monobob and 20th in two-woman.

== Personal life ==
Andreutti holds a master's degree in sports science from the University of Udine.

== Bobsleigh results ==
All results are sourced from the International Bobsleigh and Skeleton Federation (IBSF).

=== Olympic Games ===
Event	Monobob	Two-woman
(China) 2022 Beijing	15th	—
(Italy) 2026 Milano Cortina	24th	20th

=== World Championships ===
Event	Monobob	Two-woman
(Germany) 2020 Altenberg	—	DSQ
(Switzerland) 2023 St. Moritz	15th	15th
