= Fabrizio Tosini =

Italian bobsledder (born 1969)

Fabrizio Tosini (born 30 November 1969) is an Italian bobsledder who has competed since 1989. Competing in three Winter Olympics, he earned his best finish of 11th both in the two-man event at Salt Lake City in 2002 and in the four-man event at Turin in 2006.

Tosini also finished eighth in the two-man event at the 2004 FIBT World Championships in Königssee.
