= Uberto Gillarduzzi =

Italian bobsledder (1909–1994)

Personal information
- Nationality: Italian
- Born: 17 December 1909 Cortina d'Ampezzo, Austria-Hungary
- Died: 18 March 1994 (aged 84) Cortina d'Ampezzo, Italy

Sport
- Sport: Bobsleigh
Medal record
Bobsleigh
Representing Kingdom of Italy
World Championships
Silver medal – second place	1937 Cortina d'Ampezzo	Two-man

Uberto Gillarduzzi (Alternate spellings: Berto Gillarduzzi, Umberto Gillarduzzi) (17 December 1909 – 8 March 1994) was an Italian bobsledder who competed from the late 1930s to the early 1950s. He won a silver medal in the two-man event at the 1937 FIBT World Championships in Cortina d'Ampezzo.

Competing in two Winter Olympics, he earned his best finish of 12th in the two-man event at Oslo in 1952. In the four-man event he finished 14th.

== A family of bobsledders ==
Brother of two other bobsledders, as him from Cortina d'Ampezzo, Sisto and Guido.
