= Jessica Gillarduzzi =

Italian bobsledder (born 1980)

Medal record

Bobsleigh

Representing Italy

European Championships
| Bronze medal – third place | 2007 Cortina d'Ampezzo | Two-woman |

Jessica Gillarduzzi (born 7 June 1980) is an Italian bobsledder who has competed since 2001. Her best finish in the Bobsleigh World Cup was fifth in the two-woman event in 2007 twice (Cortina d'Ampezzo, Igls).

Gillarduzzi's best finish at the FIBT World Championships was 11th in the two-woman event at St. Moritz in 2007.

Competing in two Winter Olympics, she earned her best finish of 12th in the two-woman event at Turin in 2006.
