= Ilse Broeders =

Dutch bobsledder (born 1977)

Medal record

Bobsleigh

Representing Netherlands

European Championships
Bronze medal – third place	2005 Altenberg	Two-woman

Ilse Broeders (born 4 July 1977 in Loon op Zand) is a Dutch bobsledder who competed from 1999 to 2006. Competing in two Winter Olympics, she earned her best finish of tenth in the two-woman event at Salt Lake City in 2002.

She drove in the two-woman event with Jeannette Pennings. Broeders and Pennings appeared on their first Olympics at the 2002 Winter Olympics in Salt Lake City. They were named among the possible surprise medalists, but were unable to reach this effort, and finished tenth in the two-woman event.

Broeders finished 14th in the two-woman event at the 2005 FIBT World Championships in Calgary, making her eligible for the 2006 Winter Olympics in Turin. At a qualifying run-off in Oberhof, Germany, four competitors fought for two seats behind drivers Broeders and Eline Jurg. Pennings ended up in first place and joined Broeders in her team. At the Olympics, Broeders and Pennings started off as first Dutch team. However, they were unable to recover from a mistake in the upper half of the Cesana Pariol track, resulting in a crash. Both Broeders and Pennings emerged without any physical injury and were allowed to return for the remaining three runs, but withdrew from competition prior to the second run.

Broeders retired in 2006.
