= Jeannette Pennings =

Dutch bobsledder and track & field athlete

Medal record

Bobsleigh

Representing Netherlands

European Championships
Bronze medal – third place	2005 Altenberg	Two-woman

Jeannette Pennings (born 7 October 1977 in Alphen aan den Rijn) is a Dutch bobsledder and track and field athlete. The high jumper Wilbert Pennings is her brother. She started with international bobsleigh competitions in 1999. She is the runner in a 2-bob mostly alongside Ilse Broeders. Broeders and Pennings appeared on their first Olympics at the 2002 Winter Olympics in Salt Lake City. They were named among the possible surprise medalists, but were unable to reach this effort. In 2005 two Dutch female bobs qualified for the 2006 Winter Olympics in Turin; however the team line-ups were still unsure. At the qualification play-off (named bob-off) held in Oberhof, Germany, four competitors fought for two seats behind Broeders and the other driver Eline Jurg. Pennings ended up in first position and joined Broeders in her team. At the Olympics Broeders and Pennings started off as first Dutch team, but were unable to recover a mistake in the upper half of the track, which resulted in a crash. Unless the bob crashed it still was able to reach the finish, with the frightened bobsledders still inside. They were all right and had no physical problems. They were allowed to return for the remaining three runs, but mentally they were hit and withdrew from competition.
