= All Japan Bobsleigh Championships =

The All Japan Bobsleigh Championships are annual bobsledding championships organized by the Japan Bobsleigh and Luge Federation (JBLF) at the Spiral in Nagano, Japan. They were first held in 1938.

== 2-person champions ==
Season	Men's	Women's
1994–1995		
1995–1996		
1996–1997		
1997–1998		
1998–1999		
1999–2000		
2000–2001	Hiroshi Suzuki・Nachi Abe	
2001–2002	Suguru Kiyokawa・Kazuo Ishii	
2002–2003	Hiroshi Suzuki・Shinji Doigawa	Manami Hino・Harumi Yamamoto
2003–2004	Hiroshi Suzuki・Takahiro Sema	Manami Hino・Harumi Yamamoto
2004–2005	Hiroshi Suzuki・Ysunori Yoshioka	Manami Hino・Harumi Yamamoto
2005–2006	Hiroshi Suzuki・Tamaki Tsujio	Manami Hino・Harumi Yamamoto
2006–2007	Hiroshi Suzuki・Shinji Doigawa	Manami Hino・Chisato Nagaoka
2007–2008	Hiroshi Suzuki・Shinji Doigawa	Manami Hino・Chisato Nagaoka
2008–2009	Hiroshi Suzuki・Ryuichi Kobayashi	Manami Hino・Fumiko Kumagai
2009–2010	Hiroshi Suzuki・Ryuichi Kobayashi	Manami Hino・Konomi Asazu
2010–2011	Hiroshi Suzuki・Yoshinori Kikuchi	Misuzu Yoshimura・Konomi Asazu
2011–2012	Hiroshi Suzuki・Yoshinori Kikuchi	Misuzu Yoshimura・Konomi Asazu
2012–2013	Hiroshi Suzuki・Toshiki Kuroiwa	Misuzu Yoshimura・Konomi Asazu
2013–2014	Hiroshi Suzuki・Hisashi Miyazaki	Minami Homma・Chiemi Watanabe
2014–2015	Kosuke Asano・Tatsuya Sasaki	Maria Oshikiri・Saki Sashida
2015–2016	Ryuichi Kobayashi・Tatsuya Sasaki	Maria Oshikiri・Konomi Asazu
2016–2017	Suguru Kiyokawa・Ryuichi Kobayashi	—
2017–2018	Daiki Mikami・Takahiro Sema	Minami Homma・Sayaka Tsurifune

== 4-person champions ==
Season	Men's / Mixed
1994–1995	
1995–1996	
1996–1997	
1997–1998	
1998–1999	
1999–2000	
2000–2001	
2001–2002	
2002–2003	Hiroshi Suzuki・Shinji Miura・Akira Uchiyama・Shinji Doigawa
2003–2004	
2004–2005	Suguru Kiyokawa・Takahiro Sema・Takashi Hori・Mizuki Tsujio
2005–2006	Suguru Kiyokawa・Takahiro Sema・Mizuki Tsujio・Ryuichi Kobayashi
2006–2007	Canceled due to bad weather
2007–2008	Akira Uchiyama・Ryuichi Kobayashi・Takashi Hori・Mizuki Tsujio
2008–2009	Hiroshi Suzuki・Shinji Doigawa・Ryuichi Kobayashi・Mizuki Tsujio
2009–2010	Hiroshi Suzuki・Masaru Miyauchi・Shinji Doigawa・Ryuichi Kobayashi
2010–2011	Hiroshi Suzuki・Yoshinori Kikuchi・Tohru Sakurai・Kota Imai
2011–2012	Hiroshi Suzuki・Takahiro Sema・Ryuichi Kobayashi・Yoshinori Kikuchi
2012–2013	Hiroshi Suzuki・Takahiro Sema・Yoshinori Kikuchi・Toshiki Kuroiwa
2013–2014	Hiroshi Suzuki・Yoshinori Kikuchi・Shintaro Sato・Hisashi Miyazaki
2014–2015	Yasuhiro Kumagai・Junichi Hoizumi・Takeshi Udagawa・Kenji Wada
2015–2016	Minami Homma・Kosuke Asano・Ryuta Ito・Toshiki Kuroiwa
2016–2017	Suguru Kiyokawa・Akihiko Takase・Yoshinori Kikuchi・Ryuichi Kobayashi
2017–2018	Daiki Mikami・Akihiko Takase・Ryuichi Kobayashi・Yoshinori Kikuchi
