= Jingu Ice Messengers =

Japanese synchronized skating team

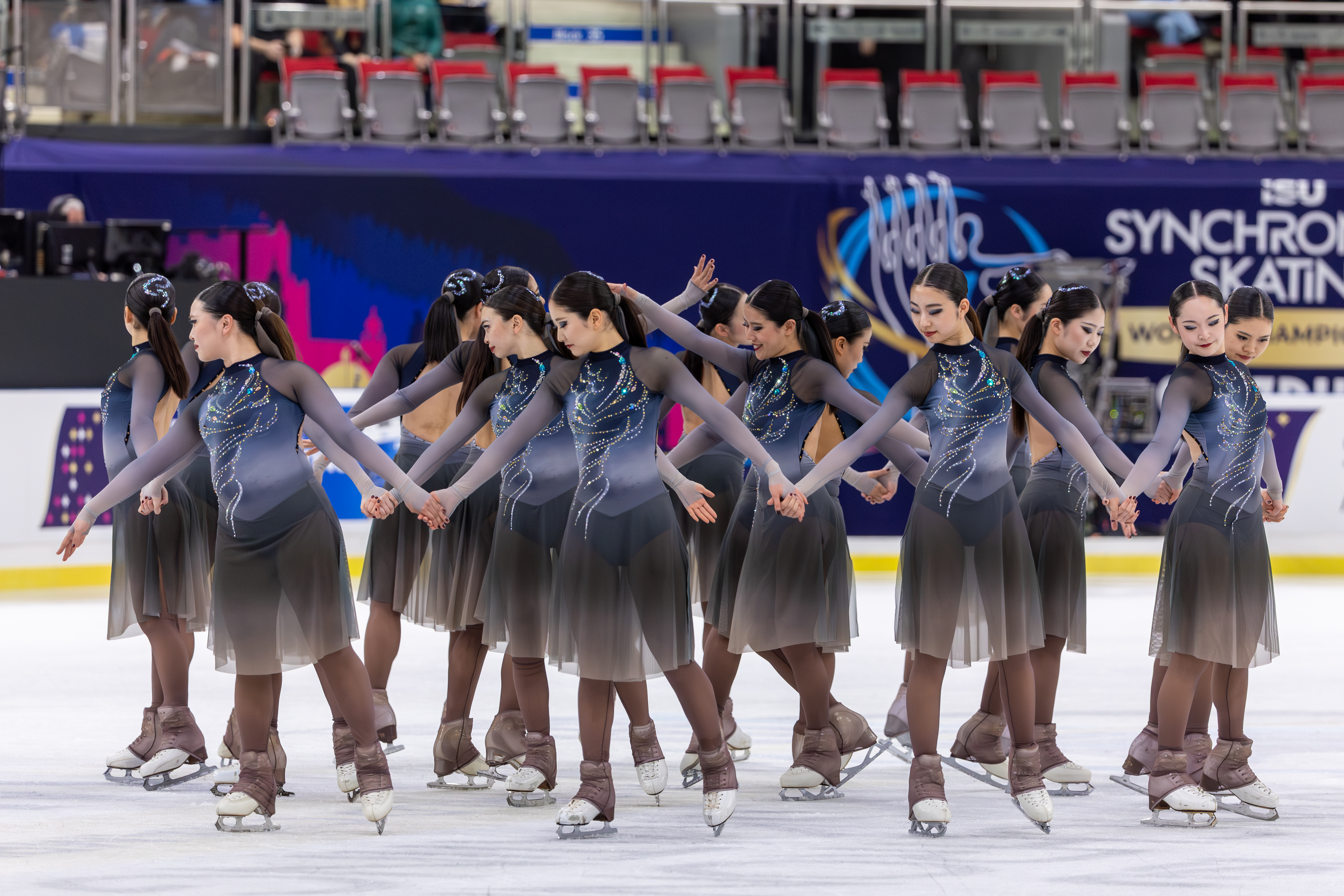
- Jingu Ice Messengers at the 2026 World Synchronized Skating Championships

Team information
- Country represented: Japan
- Formed: 2005
- Coach: Tomoyo Sekiguchi, Yasuko Uchida
- Level: Senior
- Training locations: Shinjuku, Tokyo
- World standing: 31 (2021–22); 25 (2020–21); 22 (2019–20); 31 (2018–19); 28 (2017–18); 27 (2016–17); 24 (2015–16); 22 (2014–15); ? (2013–14); 19 (2012–13); 20 (2011–12); 21 (2010–11)

ISU team best scores
- Combined total: 181.05; 2024 Worlds
- Short program: 59.90; 2024 Worlds
- Free skate: 126.20; 2023 Worlds

The Jingu Ice Messengers is a synchronized skating team from Tokyo, Japan.

Established in 2005, Jingu Ice Messengers started competing internationally in 2007. They are 14-time World Championships competitors and 10-time Japanese national champions.

== Programs ==
| Season | Short program | Free skating | Exhibition gala/ Ice show |
|---|---|---|---|
| 2018-19 | Tarzan: composed by Phil Collins | Forrest Gump: composed by Alan Silvestri | |
| 2019-20 | "Rising": composed by DRUM TAO | Hercules: composed by Alan Menken | "Rising": composed by DRUM TAO |
| 2020–21 | (Did not compete) | | Back To The Future: composed by Alan Silvestri |
| 2021-22 | Back to the Future: composed by Alan Silvestri | Avatar: composed by James Horner | |
| 22–23 | NHK Drama Hanamoyu Vol.1: by Kenji Kawai | "Coda Ai no Uta": by Emilia Jones, Marius de Vries | |
| 23–24 | "You Haven't Seen the Last of Me": by Cher, Diane Warren, Matt Serletic | Music from The Prince of Egypt: by various artists | |
| 24–25 | Music from Avatar: The Way of Water: by various artists | Music from Top Gun Maverick: by various artists | |

== Competitive highlights ==
Competition placements since the 2019-20 season
| Season | 2019-20 | 2020-21 | 2021-22 | 2022-23 | 2023-24 | 2024-25 | 2025-26 |
|---|---|---|---|---|---|---|---|
| World Championships | C | C | 15th | 10th | 10th | 9th | 15th |
| Japan Championships | 1st | 1st | 1st | 1st | 1st | 1st | 1st |
| International Classic | | | | | | | 8th (CS) |
| Lumière Cup | | | | | 6th (CS) | | |
| Mozart Cup | | | | 10th (CS) | | 8th (CS) | |
| Spring Cup | 8th (CS) | | | | | | |

Competition placements between the 2005-06 and 2018-19 season
| Season | 2005-06 | 2006-07 | 2007-08 | 2008-09 | 2009-10 | 2010-11 | 2011-12 | 2012-13 | 2013-14 | 2014-15 | 2015-16 | 2016-17 | 2017-18 | 2018-19 |
|---|---|---|---|---|---|---|---|---|---|---|---|---|---|---|
| World Championships | | 13th | | | 10th | 12th | 13th | 14th | 12th | 12th | 14th | 12th | 13th | 11th |
| Japan Championships | 2nd | 1st | 2nd | 2nd | 1st | 1st | 1st | 1st | 1st | 1st | 1st | 1st | 1st | 1st |
| French Cup | | | | 6th | 11th | 5th | | | 11th | 11th | | 10th | | |
| Leon Lurje Trophy | | | | | | | | | | | 6th | | | |
| Neuchâtel Trophy | | 8th | | | | | | | | | | | | |
| Spring Cup | | | | | | | | 6th | | | | | 7th | 7th |
