= 2026–27 synchronized skating season =

- Date: July 1, 2026 – June 30, 2027
- Previous: 2025–26
- Next: 2027–28

The 2026–27 synchronized skating season begin in the future. Running concurrent with the 2026–27 figure skating season. During this season, elite synchronized skating teams will compete in the ISU Championship level at the 2027 World Championships, and through the Challenger Series. They will also be competing at various other elite level international and national competitions.

Starting this season select athletes and personnel from Russia and Belarus would be readmitted and allowed to compete in international competitions as Neutral Athletes (AIN). Neutral athletes may compete internationally as a AIN team.

This season officially introduced Synchro9 as a separate competitive category at the Junior and Senior level.

== Competitions ==
The 2026–27 season currently includes the following major competitions.

Key

ISU Championships	Challenger Series	Synchro9 International	Other international

Date	Event	Type	Level	Location	Details
2026
November 7 – 8	Synchro9 International Competition (USA)	Synchro9 int	Sen9 – Jun9	Irvine, California	Details
November 28 – 29	Synchro9 International Competition	Synchro9 Int	Sen9 – Jun9	Vantaa	Details
December 11 – 13	Santa Claus Cup	Other int	Sen – Jun	Brno	Details
2027
January 6 – 9	Britannia Cup	Other int	Sen – Jun	Nottingham	Details
January 13 – 17	Anatolian Cup	Other int	Sen – Jun	Ankara	Details
January 14 – 16	Mozart Cup	Challenger	Sen – Jun	Salzburg	Details
January 21 – 24	Dresden Cup	Other int	Sen – Jun	Dresden	Details
January 22 – 24	Riga Amber Cup	Challenger	Sen – Jun	Riga	Details
January 29 – 30	French Cup	Other int	Sen – Jun	Rouen	Details
January 29 – 30	Synchro9 International Competition	Synchro9 Int	Sen9 – Jun9	Rouen	Details
January 29 – 31	Leon Lurje Trophy	Challenger	Sen – Jun	Gothenburg	Details
February 5 – 7	UTE Synchro Cup	Other int	Sen – Jun	Budapest	Details
February 5 – 6	Spring Cup	Other int	Sen – Jun	Sesto San Giovanni	Details
February 5 – 6	U.S. Synchronized Skating International Classic	Challenger	Sen – Jun	Norwood	Details
February 11 – 13	Hevelius Cup	Other int	Sen – Jun	Gdańsk	Details
February 18 – 21	Lumiere Cup	Other int	Sen – Jun	Eindhoven	Details
February 20 – 21	Hunskate Cup	Other int	Sen – Jun	Budapest	Details
February 20 – 21	Synchro9 International Competition	Synchro9 Int	Sen9 – Jun9	Budapest	Details
March 6 – 8	Steel City Trophy	Other int	Sen – Jun	Sheffield	Details
March 13 – 14	Budapest Cup	Other int	Sen – Jun	Budapest	Details
March 19 – 21	Easter Trophy	Other int	Sen – Jun	Sesto San Giovanni	Details
March 27 – 28	ISU Synchro9 World Championships	ISU Championships	Sen9 – Jun9	Nottingham	Details
March 31 – April 1	ISU World Junior Synchronized Skating Championships	ISU Championships	Junior	Nottingham	Details
April 3 – 4	ISU World Synchronized Skating Championships	ISU Championships	Senior	Nottingham	Details
Type: ISU Champ. = ISU Championships; Challenger = Challenger Series; Synchro9 int. = Synchro9 international events; Other int. = International events except ISU Championships; Levels: Sen. = Senior; Jun. = Junior; Sen9 = Senior9; Jun9 = Junior 9 TBA = To be announced

== International medalists ==
Synchro9 International
Competition	Gold	Silver	Bronze	Results
Synchro9 International Competition (USA)	(Japan) Jingu Ice Messengers	(Japan) Sisteria	(United States) Haydenettes	

Synchro9 International Junior
Competition	Gold	Silver	Bronze	Results
Synchro9 International Competition (USA)	(United States) Teams Elite	(United States) Lexettes	(Japan) Jingu Ice Messengers	
