= Hisashi Miyazaki =

Japanese bobsledder and sprinter (born 1981)

Personal information
- Nationality: Japanese
- Born: 19 March 1981 (age 45) Unzen, Japan
- Education: Tokai University Graduate school
- Height: 1.83 m (6 ft 0 in)
- Weight: 81 kg (179 lb)

Sport
- Country: Japan
- Sport: Bobsleigh, Track and field
- Personal best(s): 100 m: 10.28 (1997, 2002); 200 m: 20.53 (2003)
Medal record
Men's track and field
Representing Japan
Asian Games
Silver medal – second place	2002 Busan	4×100 m relay
World Junior Championships
Bronze medal – third place	2000 Santiago	4×100 m relay

Hisashi Miyazaki (宮崎 久, Miyazaki Hisashi; born 19 March 1981 in Unzen) is a Japanese retired bobsledder and track and field sprinter.

== Track and field career ==
He competed internationally for Japan in the 200 metres and 4 × 100 metres relay, winning a relay bronze at the 2000 World Junior Championships in Athletics, taking a 200 m national title at the Japanese Athletics Championships, and was sixth in the relay at the 2003 World Championships in Athletics.

=== Personal bests ===
Event	Time (s)	Competition	Venue	Date	Notes
100 m	10.28 (wind: +1.5 m/s)		Kurume, Japan	29 June 1997	
100 m	10.28 (wind: +1.9 m/s)	Mito International Meet	Mito, Japan	6 May 2002	
100 m	10.19 (wind: +4.5 m/s)	Mito International Meet	Mito, Japan	6 May 2002	Wind-assisted
200 m	20.53 (wind: +0.6 m/s)	National Championships	Yokohama, Japan	6 June 2003	
4 × 100 m relay	38.57 (relay leg: 1st) (Note: Tokai University team, with teammates Shingo Suetsugu, Toshiyuki Fujimoto and Masayuki Okusako)	National University Championships	Tokyo, Japan	29 September 2001	Former NUR

=== International competition ===
Year	Competition	Venue	Position	Event	Time	Notes
Representing Japan
2000	World Junior Championships	Santiago, Chile	3rd	4×100 m relay	39.47 (relay leg: 4th)	NJR
2002	Asian Games	Busan, South Korea	8th (sf)	200 m	21.07 (wind: +0.8 m/s)	
2002	Asian Games	Busan, South Korea	2nd	4×100 m relay	38.90 (relay leg: 1st)	
2003	World Championships	Paris, France	21st (qf)	200 m	20.70 (wind: +0.7 m/s)	
2003	World Championships	Paris, France	6th	4×100 m relay	39.05 (relay leg: 2nd)	

=== National titles ===
- National Championships
  - 200 m: 2002

== Bobsleigh career ==
Miyazaki competed at the 2014 Winter Olympics for Japan. He teamed with driver Hiroshi Suzuki in the two-man event, finishing 28th, and with Suzuki, Shintaro Sato and Toshiki Kuroiwa in the four-man event, finishing 26th.

Miyazaki made his World Cup debut in December 2013. As of April 2014, his best finish is 19th, in a four-man event in 2013-14 at Lake Placid.

=== International competition ===
Year	Competition	Venue	Position	Event	Partners	Time
Representing Japan
2013-14	World Cup	Lake Placid, United States	23rd	Two-man	Hiroshi Suzuki	56.83
2013-14	World Cup	Lake Placid, United States	19th	Four-man	Hiroshi Suzuki; Shintaro Sato; Toshiki Kuroiwa	1:51.86 (55.87 / 55.99)
2014	Olympic Games	Sochi, Russia	26th	Two-man	Hiroshi Suzuki	2:54.14 (57.91 / 58.21 / 58.02)
2014	Olympic Games	Sochi, Russia	24th	Four-man	Hiroshi Suzuki; Shintaro Sato; Toshiki Kuroiwa	2:49.46 (56.41 / 56.42 / 56.63)

=== National titles ===
- National Championships
  - Two-man: 2013
  - Four-man: 2013
