= All-America =

American amateur athletic award

The All-America designation is an annual honor bestowed on outstanding athletes in the United States who are considered to be among the best athletes in their respective sports. Individuals receiving this distinction are typically added to an All-America team for their sport. Some sports have multiple All-America teams, and list the honorees as members of a first team, second team, or third team.

All-America teams are composed of outstanding U.S. amateur athletes. Individuals falling short of qualifying for the honor may receive All-America honorable mention. The designation is typically used at the collegiate level, although, beginning in 1957, high school athletes in football began being honored with All-American status, which then carried over to other sports like basketball and cross-country running. The selection criteria vary by sport. Athletes at the high school and college level placed on All-America teams are referred to as All-Americans.

== Term usage ==
Individuals earn All-America honors in their sport either by athletic achievement at a championship event or by being selected by members of the national media, coaches' association, or through a poll. The All-American terminology is primarily a demonym and is often used with regard to college and occasionally to high school players in the United States and its territories.

Selection to an All-America team for collegiate (or high-school) players, however, is honorary in nature. Likewise, there may also be a lower-tiered accolade referred to as honorable mention that is conferred upon non-team members of similar caliber in the same class. "All-America teams" do not typically play any games as a unit, unlike many of the all-star teams.

The original use of the term "All-America" seems to have been in reference to a list of college football players who were regarded as the best at their respective positions. The first "All-America" team was the 1889 All-America college football team selected by Caspar Whitney and published in This Week's Sports in association with Walter Camp.

In triathlons, USA Triathlon bestows the All America status on the top 10% within their age group.

The term has also been used in athletics in new ways to recognize the academic achievements of student-athletes as "Academic All-America" teams are named. The term "Academic All-America" is a registered trademark of the College Sports Information Directors of America, which began the program in 1952 to recognize college athletes at all levels of competition and in all collegiate sports.

== Collegiate sports ==
Each year different sets of All-American teams are recognized toward consensus and unanimous selection recognition. A "unanimous selection" is a player who is listed as a first team All-American by all recognized lists. A "consensus All-American" is a player who is listed as a first team All-American by at least half of the recognized lists. All-America teams are selected annually in various collegiate sports.

=== Archery ===
In collegiate archery competitions All-America selections are determined by the US Collegiate Archery (USCA) association. All-American honors are awarded for Olympic Recurve, Compound Target, and Bowhunter divisions. All-American honors are awarded to the top 10 archers in each division based on aggregate scores from the National Indoor and Intercollegiate Championships each year.

=== Baseball ===
In baseball, All-America teams are selected annually by the American Baseball Coaches Association and Collegiate Baseball.

=== Basketball ===
In Division I men's basketball, the National Collegiate Athletic Association recognizes consensus All-America teams via a points system, currently based on teams chosen by four entities: the Associated Press (AP), the National Association of Basketball Coaches, Sporting News, and the United States Basketball Writers Association (USBWA). Many other bodies and publications select their own All-America teams.

In Division I women's basketball, the NCAA recognizes unanimous first-team selections since 1995 based on selections from the AP, USBWA and Women's Basketball Coaches Association.

=== Cross country running ===
Selections are administered by the U.S. Track & Field and Cross Country Coaches Association (USTFCCCA). In Division I, the top 40 overall finishers at the national meet are all named to the All-America team. In Division III, as of 2017, the top 40 finishers garner All-American distinction (previously top 35). The student-athlete's team must be a member of the USTFCCCA.

=== Fencing ===
Based on the NCAA Fencing Championships, the U.S. Fencing Coaches Association annually selects athletes for All-American first team, second team, third team, and honorable mention titles.

=== Football ===
The National Collegiate Athletic Association currently recognizes All-America college football teams selected by the Associated Press, American Football Coaches Association, Football Writers Association of America, Sporting News, and the Walter Camp Football Foundation (WCFF) to determine consensus All-Americans.

=== Golf ===
All-American honors are awarded by the GCAA for men's golf.

=== Gymnastics ===
In NCAA men's gymnastics, all American status is awarded to the top 8 finishers in the national championship.

=== Ice hockey ===
The American Hockey Coaches Association (AHCA) selects All-Americans at the Division I and Division III levels, for both men and women. For Division I men, they select a first- and a second-team for East and for West; for Division I women, they select national first- and second-teams. For Division III men, they select a first- and a second-team for East and for West; for Division III women, they select a first and second team for both East and West.

=== Lacrosse ===
The United States Intercollegiate Lacrosse Association (USILA) annually selects men's lacrosse All-Americans, distinguished by first team, second team, third team, and honorable mention.

The Intercollegiate Women's Lacrosse Coaches Association (IWLCA) annually selects women's lacrosse All-Americans, distinguished by first team, second team, third team, and honorable mention.

US Lacrosse, the national governing body for men's and women's lacrosse, annually selects national boys' and girls' high school All-Americans.

=== Rowing ===
The American Collegiate Rowing Association (ACRA) and Collegiate Rowing Coaches of America (CRCA) name All-American teams for men and women respectively.

=== Rugby union ===
The term All-America was used for the student rugby teams that toured Australia in 1912 and New Zealand in 1913, see Rugby union in the United States.

=== Sailing ===
The Inter-Collegiate Sailing Association (ICSA) selects All-American teams annually at the end of every full racing season. The selected sailors are then inducted into the ICSA Hall of Fame.

=== Soccer ===
In soccer, United Soccer Coaches (formerly known as the National Soccer Coaches Association of America, or NSCAA) annually names an eleven-member All-America team, as well as Division I women, and Division II and III teams.

=== Swimming and diving ===
In NCAA swimming and diving, athletes and relay teams who make the championship final (top eight) are considered First-Team All-Americans. Athletes and relay teams that qualify for the consolation final (determines places 9–16) are considered Honorable Mention All-Americans. All-American teams are selected by the College Swimming Coaches Association of America (CSCAA).

=== Tennis ===
The Intercollegiate Tennis Association annually selects men's and women's D-1 players with the following criteria SINGLES (denoted by 'S') 1.) Top 16 seed in NCAA Singles Championships, or 2.) Reach round of 16 in NCAA Singles Championships, or 3.) Finish in the Top 20 of the final ITA Rankings. DOUBLES (denoted by 'D') 1.) Top eight seed in NCAA Doubles Championships, or 2.) Reach quarterfinals of NCAA Doubles Championship, or 3.) Finish in Top 10 of final ITA Rankings.

=== Track and field ===
Administered by the U.S. Track & Field and Cross Country Coaches Association, the selection rule differs for NCAA Division I compared to NCAA Division II, Division III, NJCAA and NAIA. For all categories, the top eight finishers in each individual event are awarded First-Team All-America designation, while Division I athletes placed ninth through sixteenth are awarded Second-Team. Relays are judged strictly on a top-eight basis. The cutoffs are the same for both indoor and outdoor competition. The student-athlete's team must be a member of the USTFCCCA, and relay members must run in the finals to earn All-America status.

In AIAW track and field before women's sports were added to the NCAA, All-America certificates were awarded to the top six athletes at the national outdoor or indoor championships per event.

=== Volleyball ===
The American Volleyball Coaches Association (AVCA) selects five NCAA All-America teams. In women's volleyball, it selects teams for all three NCAA divisions. In the men's game, teams are chosen in the National Collegiate division (which includes members of Division I and Division II) and in Division III. The AVCA also selects teams for the NAIA, USCAA and NCCAA.

=== Wrestling ===
In all NCAA divisions, the NAIA, and the NCWA, the top 8 placers at the national championship tournament are considered All-Americans. In the NJCAA, the top 5 placers are considered All-Americans.

== High school sports ==
At the high school level, noted All-America teams are selected by Parade magazine in football, and from 1957 to 2015 in basketball. In baseball, the ABCA/Rawlings High School All-America Baseball Team has been selected annually since 1969.

Also in basketball, the McDonald's restaurant chain selects players annually for its McDonald's All-American Game, and there is also a Ballislife All-American Game. In football, there is the U.S. Army All-American Bowl and the Under Armour All-America Game. Since 2000, the United States Army has sponsored its own annual All-American high school football competition, the U.S. Army All-American Bowl, which includes an All-American football team, split East and West, and an All-American marching band.

In 2005, Offense-Defense Sports began publishing a Top 100 ranking for nation's the top high school football athletes. The Offense-Defense All-American Bowl is held every January, featuring the 88 top-ranked high school seniors.

Athletes who place in the top 15 of each gender division at the Foot Locker Cross Country Championships, a series of annual cross country running races which are held in various regions of the US, are awarded All-American honors.

The National Interscholastic Swim Coaches Association publishes an Academic All America Awards list for graduating seniors that have maintained a minimum GPA of 3.750, and have lettered in their high school programs in swimming, diving, or water polo.

The National High School Coaches Association also honors the nation's top student athletes on a yearly basis, as "High School Academic All-Americans".

In 2020, High School Football America began publishing an annual Academic All-America Team honoring thousands of student-athletes from around the nation.

== See also ==
- AAU Men's Basketball All-Americans
- Academic All-America
- All-Australian team
- All-Japan (disambiguation)
- Underclass All-American
