= Japan Open Championship =

Japan Open Championship may refer to:

- Japan Open Golf Championship
- Japan Open Tennis Championships

== See also ==
- Japan Open (disambiguation)
- Japanese Championship (disambiguation)
