= Japanese Championship =

Japanese Championships or Japanese Championship may refer to:

- All-Japan Artistic Gymnastics Championships
- All Japan Bobsleigh Championships
- All Japan Championship (9-Ball) (9-ball and 10-ball pool event)
- All-Japan Formula Three Championship (racing)
- All-Japan Judo Championships
- All Japan Road Race Championship (motorcycle racing)
- All-Japan Rugby Football Championship (rugby union football)
- All Japan Sports Prototype Championship (racing)
- AWA Japan Women's Championship (professional wrestling)
- F4 Japanese Championship (racing)
- Japan Championships in Athletics
- Japan Figure Skating Championships
- Japan LPGA Championship (golf)
- Japan Open Championship (disambiguation)
  - Japan Open Golf Championship
  - Japan Open Tennis Championships
- Japan PGA Championship (golf)
- Japan Series or Japan Championship Series (baseball)
- Japanese Chess Championship
- Japanese Heavyweight Championship (professional wrestling)
- Japanese National Badminton Championships
- Japanese National Road Race Championships

== See also ==
- All-Japan (disambiguation)
