= 2025 World Junior Synchronized Skating Championships =

Synchronized skating competition

- Date: March 7 – 8
- Season: 2024–25
- Location: Gothenburg, Sweden
- Host: International Skating Union

Champions
- Synchronized skating: (United States) Teams Elite

The 2025 World Junior Synchronized Skating Championships were held March 7–8, 2025, in Gothenburg, Sweden.

== Schedule ==
Date	Time	Segment
March 7	16:00 pm	Short program
March 8	14:30 pm	Free skating

== Results ==
Results
Rank	Team	Nation	Total	SP		FS	
1st place, gold medalist(s)	Teams Elite	United States	205.28	3	72.85	1	132.43
2nd place, silver medalist(s)	Fintastic	Finland	201.87	5	71.11	2	130.76
3rd place, bronze medalist(s)	Skyliners	United States	201.27	2	73.51	3	127.76
4	Les Supremes	Canada	200.01	1	73.83	4	126.18
5	Valley Bay Synchro	Finland	195.72	4	72.57	5	123.15
6	Seaside	Sweden	177.10	6	64.53	6	112.57
7	Nova	Canada	174.34	7	62.83	7	111.51
8	Spirit	Sweden	169.56	8	60.31	8	109.25
9	Starlight	Switzerland	156.47	9	52.55	9	103.92
10	Jingu Ice Messengers	Japan	152.25	11	51.86	10	100.39
11	Icicles	United Kingdom	148.61	10	52.05	11	96.56
12	Hot Shivers	Italy	139.32	12	50.61	14	88.71
13	Ice Fire	Poland	139.06	14	47.78	12	91.28
14	Ladybirds	Italy	137.92	13	48.26	13	89.66
15	Harmonia	Czech Republic	133.48	15	44.80	15	88.68
16	Magic	Hungary	116.43	16	44.79	18	71.64
17	Berlin	Germany	115.30	17	43.15	17	72.15
18	Colibris Vienna	Austria	114.52	18	40.83	16	73.69
19	Jeanne D'Arc	France	102.29	19	39.75	20	62.54
20	Mirum	Spain	99.96	20	34.62	19	65.34
21	Illuminettes	Netherlands	95.77	21	33.39	21	62.38
22	Zagreb Snowflakes	Croatia	88.84	22	31.31	22	57.53
23	Southern Sky	Australia	81.96	23	29.55	23	52.41
24	Elite	Turkey	76.27	24	24.87	24	51.40
