= Manami Hino =

Japanese bobsledder (born 1980)

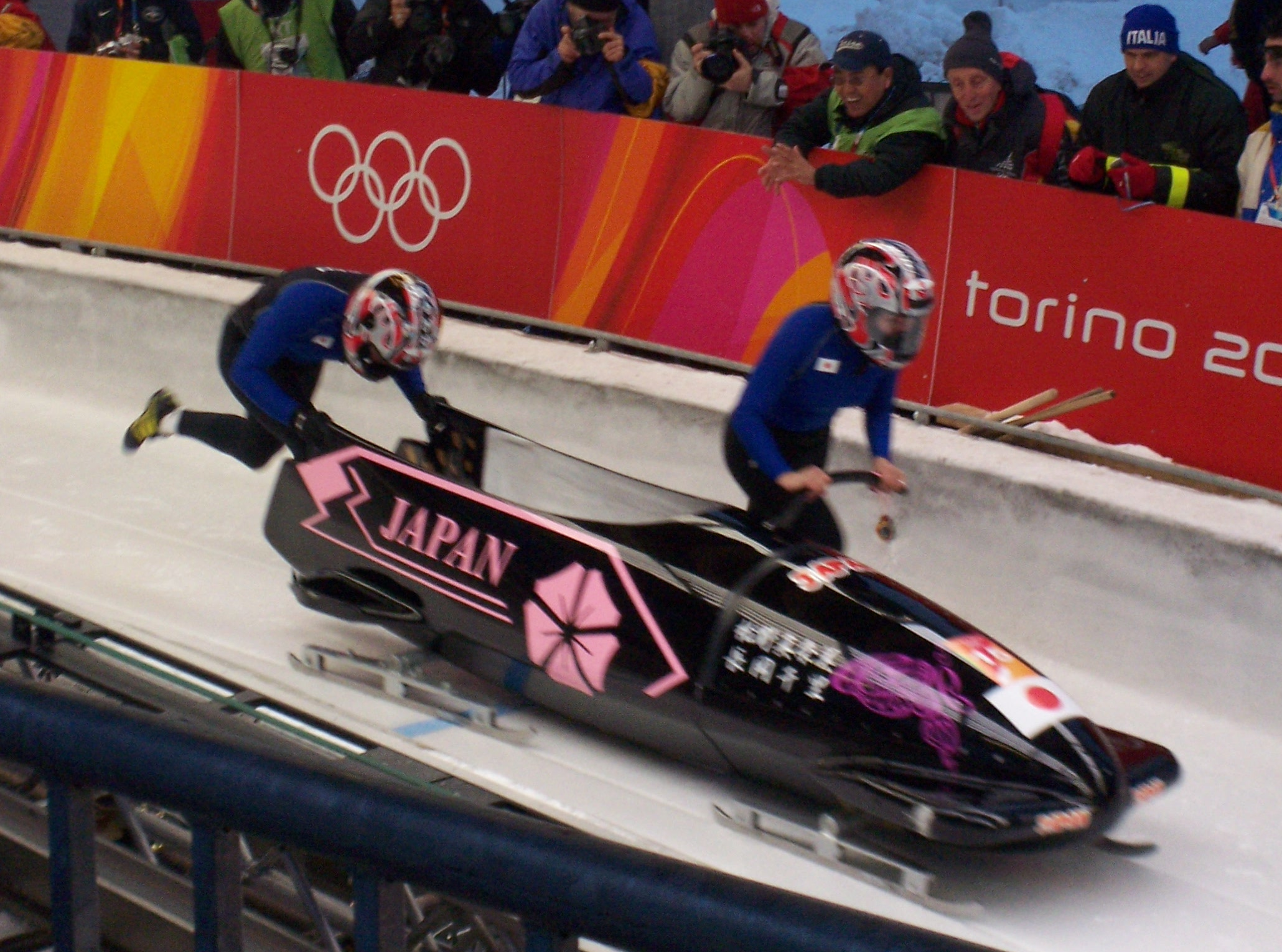
- Manami Hino (on right) and Chisato Nagaoka at the 2006 Winter Olympics in Turin.

Personal information
- Born: January 8, 1980 (age 46) Obihiro, Hokkaido, Japan
- Website: www.team-hino.com

Sport
- Country: Japan
- Sport: Bobsled

Manami Hino (桧野真奈美; born January 8, 1980 in Obihiro, Hokkaido) is a Japanese bobsledder who has competed since 1999.

== Performance ==
- Finished 15th in the two-woman event at the 2006 Winter Olympics.
- Finished 20th in the two-woman event at the 2007 FIBT World Championships in St. Moritz.
- Finished 1st in the All Japan Bobsleigh Championships in Dec. 2009. (Hino has finished 1st in this competition every year since 2002)
- Finished 16th in the 2010 Olympic Games in Vancouver.
