= Team Braemar =

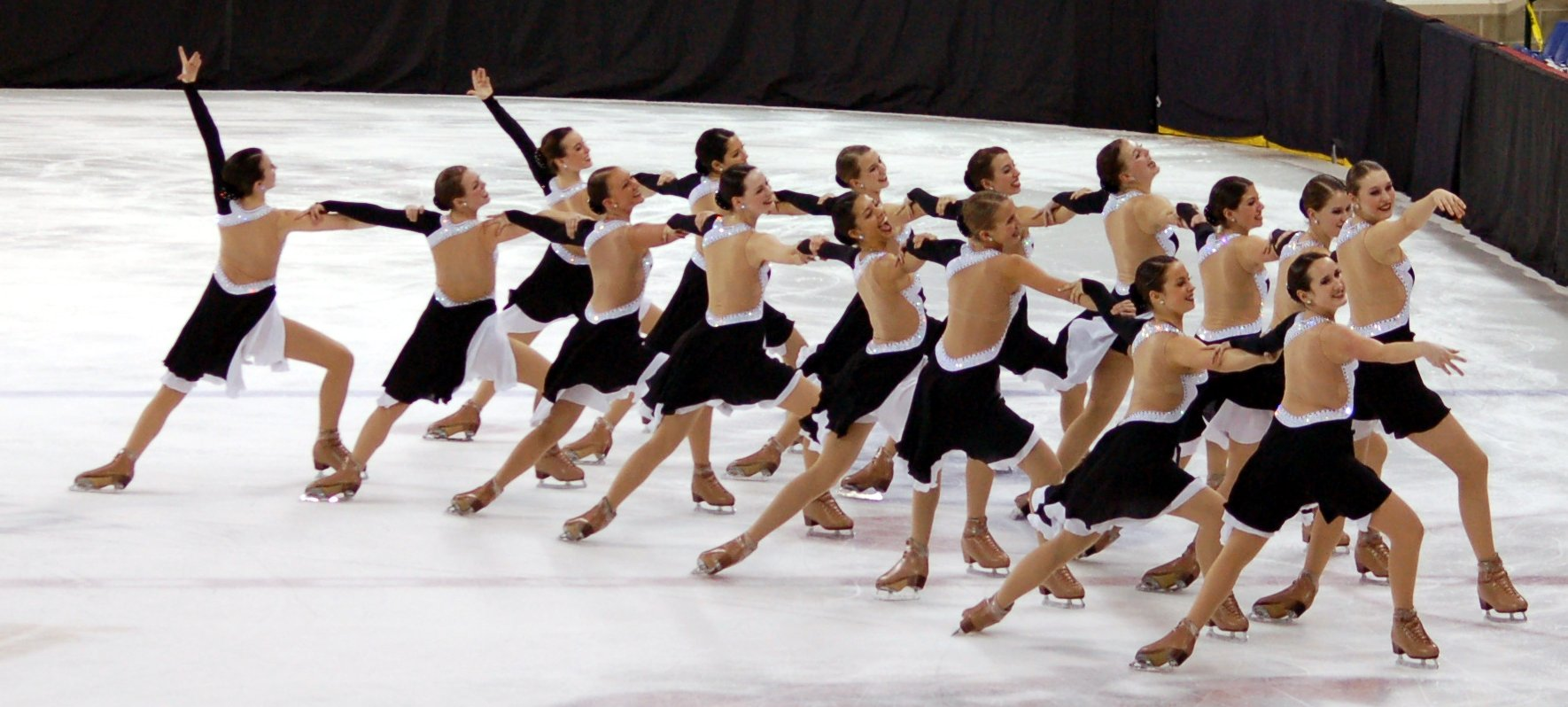
- Team Braemar performing Ina Bauers at the 2007 Colonial Classic.

Team information
- Country represented: United States
- Retired: 2015
- Home town: Edina, Minnesota
- Coach: Vicki Korn
- Level: Junior

Team Braemar was a junior-level synchronized skating team representing Braemar City of Lakes Figure Skating Club, based in Edina, Minnesota. They were Junior world challenge cup bronze medalists (2011), four-time Junior U.S. champions, and two-time junior national medalists. They skated in the opening ceremonies of the 1980 Winter Olympics in Lake Placid, New York.

Team Braemar, renamed as Braemar Panache in 2017, was the name for all teams fielded by Braemar City of Lakes Figure Skating Club

== Competitive Highlights ==
International
Event	02–03	03–04	04–05	05–06	06–07	07–08	08–09	09–10	10–11	11–12	12–13	13–14	14–15
Junior Worlds							5th	4th	3rd	4th			
French Cup									1st	6th	6th		
Prague Cup						7th							
Spring Cup							2nd	2nd				2nd	
Zagreb Snowflakes					1st								
National													
U.S. Champs	8th	8th	10th	4th	3rd	5th	1st	1st	2nd	1st	1st	7th	11th
