= Chisato Nagaoka =

Japanese bobsledder (born 1976)

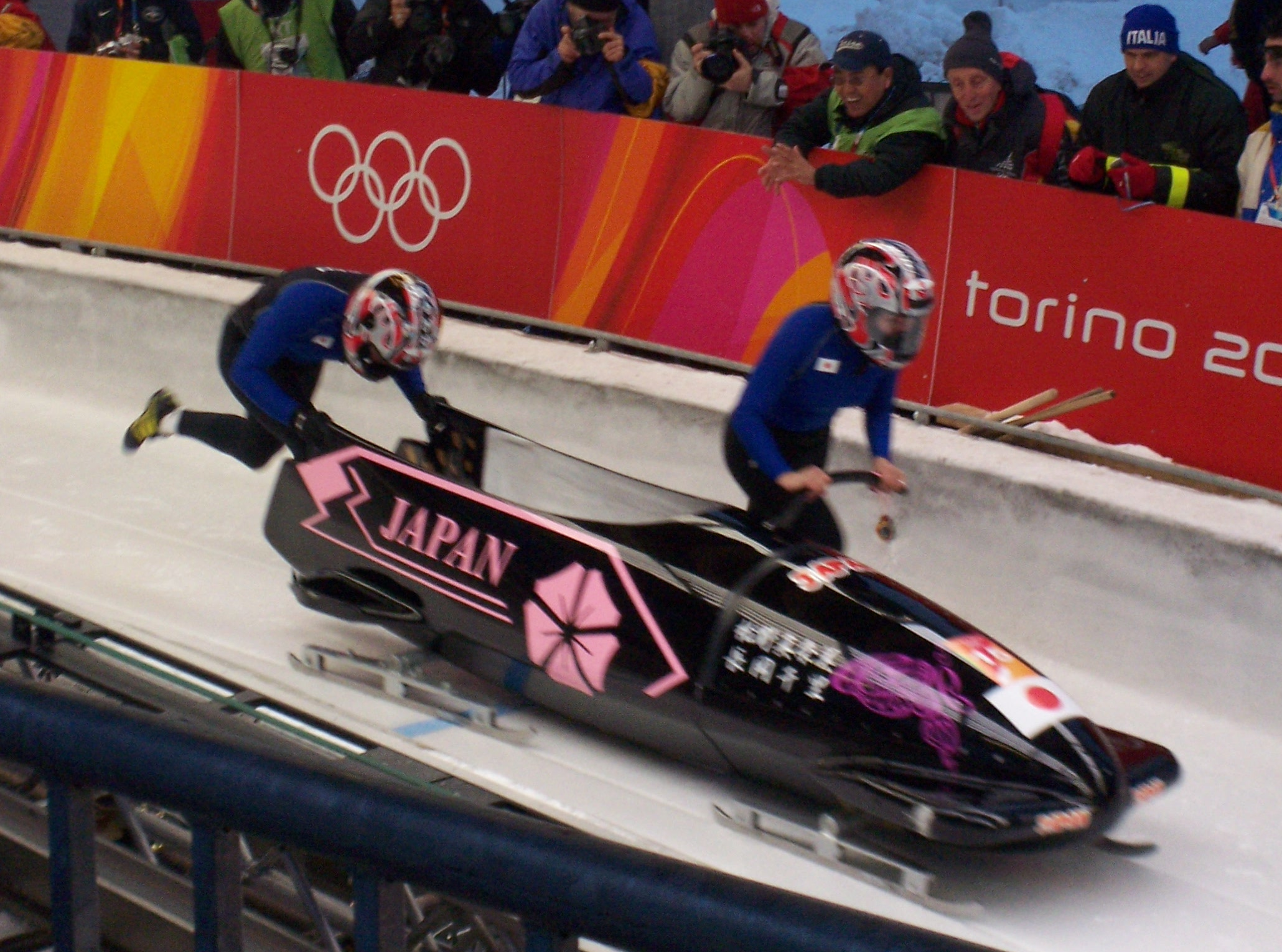
- Chisato Nagaoka (on left) and Manami Hino at the 2006 Winter Olympics in Turin.

Personal information
- Born: April 5, 1976 (age 50) Himeji, Hyogo, Japan

Sport
- Country: Japan
- Sport: Bobsled

Chisato Nagaoka (長岡千里, Nagaoka Chisato; born 5 April 1976 in Himeji, Hyogo) is a Japanese bobsledder who has competed at the 2006 Winter Olympics in Turin, Italy. She, along with Manami Hino, was the first Japanese women's pair to participate in the bobsleigh events in the Winter Olympics.

== Performance ==
- She earned her best finish of 15th in the two-woman event at the 2006 Winter Olympics.
- She finished 1st in the two-woman event at the All Japan Bobsleigh Championships in a pair with Manami Hino for two consecutive years between 2006 and 2008, held at the Nagano Bobsleigh-Luge Park, Japan.
