= Toshiki Kuroiwa =

Japanese bobsledder (born 1993)

Personal information
- Nationality: Japanese
- Born: 31 August 1993 (age 33) Yokohama, Japan
- Height: 1.72 m (5 ft 8 in)
- Weight: 78 kg (172 lb)

Sport
- Country: Japan
- Sport: Bobsleigh

Toshiki Kuroiwa (黒岩 俊喜) (born August 31, 1993 in Yokohama) is a Japanese bobsledder.

Kuroiwa competed at the 2014 Winter Olympics for Japan. He teamed with driver Hiroshi Suzuki, Shintaro Sato and Hisashi Miyazaki in the four-man event, finishing 26th.

Kuroiwa made his World Cup debut in December 2013. As of April 2014, his best finish is 19th, in a four-man event in 2012-13 at Lake Placid.
