= Shintaro Sato =

Japanese bobsledder and sprinter (born 1980)

Personal information
- Nationality: Japanese
- Born: 20 August 1980 (age 45) Tsurugashima, Japan
- Education: Physical education University of Tsukuba Graduate school
- Height: 1.83 m (6 ft 0 in)
- Weight: 85 kg (187 lb)

Sport
- Country: Japan
- Sport: Bobsleigh; Athletics
- Now coaching: Kirara Shiraishi; Shuhei Tada

Achievements and titles
- Personal best(s): 100 m: 10.36 (2004); 200 m: 20.83 (2000)

Shintaro Sato (佐藤 真太郎, Satō Shintarō) (born August 20, 1980 in Tsurugashima) is a Japanese retired bobsledder and sprinter.

== Bobsleigh career ==
Sato competed at the 2014 Winter Olympics for Japan. He teamed with driver Hiroshi Suzuki, Toshiki Kuroiwa and Hisashi Miyazaki in the four-man event, finishing 26th.

Sato made his World Cup debut in December 2013. As of April 2014, his best finish is 19th, in a pair of events in 2012-13 at Lake Placid.

=== International competitions ===
Year	Competition	Venue	Position	Event	Partners	Time
Representing Japan
2013-14	World Cup	Lake Placid, United States	19th	Two-man	Hiroshi Suzuki	1:52.67 (56.32 / 56.35)
2013-14	World Cup	Lake Placid, United States	19th	Four-man	Hiroshi Suzuki; Hisashi Miyazaki; Toshiki Kuroiwa	1:51.86 (55.87 / 55.99)
2014	Olympic Games	Sochi, Russia	24th	Four-man	Hiroshi Suzuki; Hisashi Miyazaki; Toshiki Kuroiwa	2:49.46 (56.41 / 56.42 / 56.63)

== Athletics career ==
He was part of the Waseda University team that won the 4 × 100 metres relay at the 1999 and 2000 Japanese Championships. He was also the 2004 Japanese National Sports Festival champion in the 100 metres and the 1995 Japanese Junior High School Championships champion in the 400 metres.

=== Personal bests ===
- 100 metres – 10.36 (Kumagaya 2004)
- 200 metres – 20.83 (+1.2 m/s) (Yokohama 2000)

== Coaching career ==
He was the men's and women's sprint coach of track and field club at Daito Bunka University from 2009 to 2017 and later became men's and women's sprint director in 2018. Before that, he was the coach of track and field club at Sayamagaoka High School for three years.

He is currently coach of Japanese sprinters Kirara Shiraishi and Shuhei Tada.
