= Synchronized skating =

Ice skating discipline

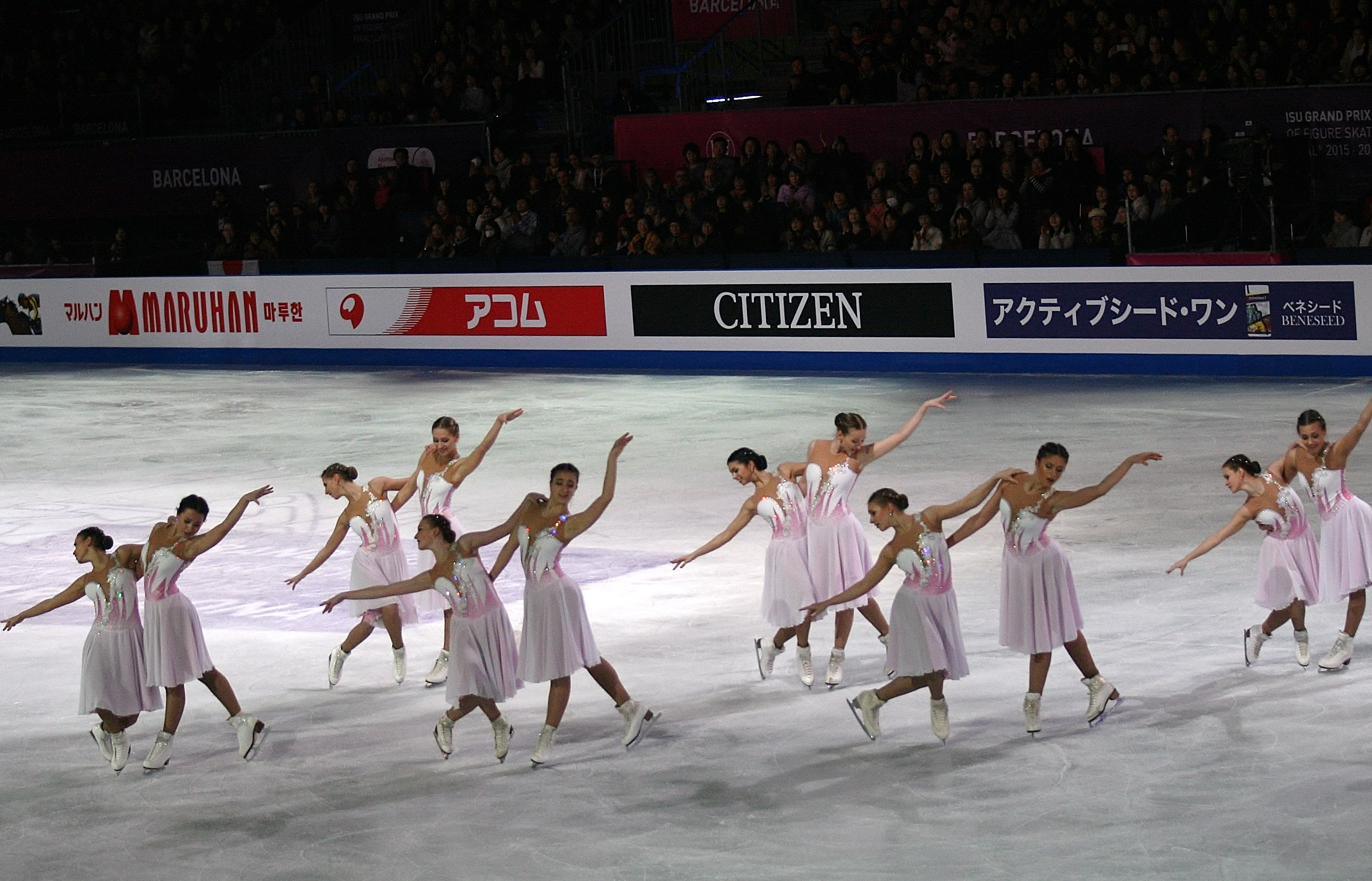
- Team Paradise at the 2015 Grand Prix
- Highest governing body: International Skating Union
- Nicknames: "precision skating", "synchro"
- First Performed: 1956; 70 years ago

Characteristics
- Team members: between 8 and 20 figure skaters including 4 alternates; maximum 16 compete on the ice at once
- Mixed-sex: Mixed
- Type: Discipline of figure skating; Team sport; Winter sport
- Equipment: Figure skates
- Venue: Ice rink; Figure skating rink

Presence
- Olympic: Yes
- Paralympic: No
- World Games: No

Synchronized skating (or synchronised skating), often called synchro, is an ice skating sport where between 8 and 20 skaters perform together as a team. They move as a flowing unit at high speed over the ice, while performing elements and footwork.

This complex sport originated in 1956 and was initially called "precision skating" due to its emphasis on the maintenance of intricate and precise formations and the requirement of precise timing from all members of the group. Synchronized skating is now well-established as an organized sport in several countries with several of them having produced teams who frequently win championships at the international level. As of 2022, there are more than 600 synchro teams in United States alone.

The new Synchro9 discipline, being debuted at the 2030 Winter Olympics, features a smaller team of 9 skaters, shorter high-impact performances, and a focus on speed, clarity, and visual impact.

== Details ==
Synchronized skating currently uses a judging format similar to singles, pairs and ice dancing. The discipline is primarily judged on skating skills, transitions, performance, composition, interpretation and difficulty of elements.

A synchronized skating free skate program consists of elements that are executed in various shapes and formations both connected and disconnected, such as blocks, triangles, circles, lines, or wheels, done while intersecting, traveling across the ice, and rotating. Teams are required to perform turns and step sequences, ranging in difficulty with each level.

There are many different levels including Aspire 1-4, Pre-Preliminary, Preliminary, Pre-juvenile, Open juvenile, Intermediate, Novice, Junior, Senior, and Adult. In the highest-ranking levels, Junior and Senior division teams are required to perform a short program in addition to the free skate. The short program is more technical in nature, whereas the free skating program is longer and provides an opportunity to showcase expression, emotion and interpretation.

Junior level teams compete in the Junior World Synchronized Skating Championships. At the senior level, teams compete at the World Synchronized Skating Championship. All member nations of the ISU are allocated one entry for each level, countries that placed in the top five of the previous championship are awarded two team entries.

The required elements must be performed in specific ways, as described by published communications by the ISU, unless otherwise specified. The ISU publishes violations and their points values yearly. Situations warranting deductions in synchronized skating include elements where one-quarter of the team or more fails to execute a maneuver in congruence with the majority of the team, falls, interruptions, illegal maneuvers (such as cartwheels), and violations of the rules concerning time, music, and clothing.

== History ==
In 1956, the first synchronized skating team was formed by Dr. Richard Porter. The 'Hockettes' skated out of Ann Arbor, Michigan and entertained spectators during intermissions of the University of Michigan Wolverines hockey team. In the early days, precision skating (as it was then called) resembled a drill team routine, or a precision dance company such as The Rockettes. In 1974, the ISU published the first judges' handbook for synchronized skating.

During the 1970s, the interest for this new sport grew and developed. Teams developed more creative and innovative routines incorporating stronger basic skating skills, new maneuvers and more sophisticated transitions with greater speed, style and agility. Due to the increased interest in the sport in North America, the first official international competition was held between Canadian and American teams in Michigan in March 1976. With the internationalization of the sport, it has evolved, with increasing emphasis on speed and skating skills, and "highlight" elements such as jumps, spirals, spins, and lifts that originally were not permitted in competition.

== Elements and formations ==
Competition programs include a variety of elements utilizing various shapes or formations. Scoring of each element is determined by their base value (BV) and grade of execution (GOE), together this determines the teams technical element score (TES). In competition the technical panel identifies elements as each element is performed, elements are then assigned a level of difficulty ranging from B (basic) to Level 4 (most difficult). Element shapes are a set of distinct configurations that are easily identifiable, these shapes are used as the basis of most synchronized skating elements.

=== Formations ===
Certain elements are composed of specific distinctive shapes or formations, occasionally transitioning from one shape to a different shape for a higher level of difficulty.

Les Suprêmes performing a pivoting block element

==== Block ====
Identifiable by skaters lined up in at least three separate lines forming a polygonal shape, characterized as block, pyramid or diamond shapes in straight even spaced lines. The shapes can be closed or open formation, with open formations maintaining distinct empty space in the middle of the formation.

==== Circle ====
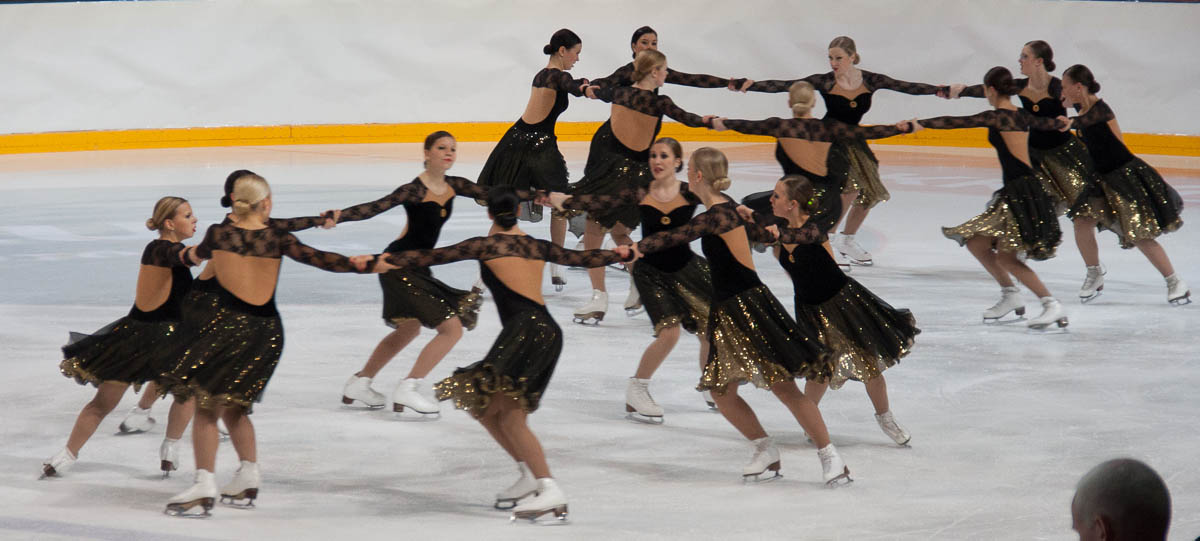
Golden Blades performing a circle.

Characterized by rotating around a common center with even distance from the midpoint and spacing from teammates, circles can be connected or disconnected. different circle configurations include multiple circles, circle within a circle, and interlocking. To increase the level of difficulty a circle can include changes of place, or configuration, step sequences, weaving, interlocking, and changes of rotational direction.

==== Line ====
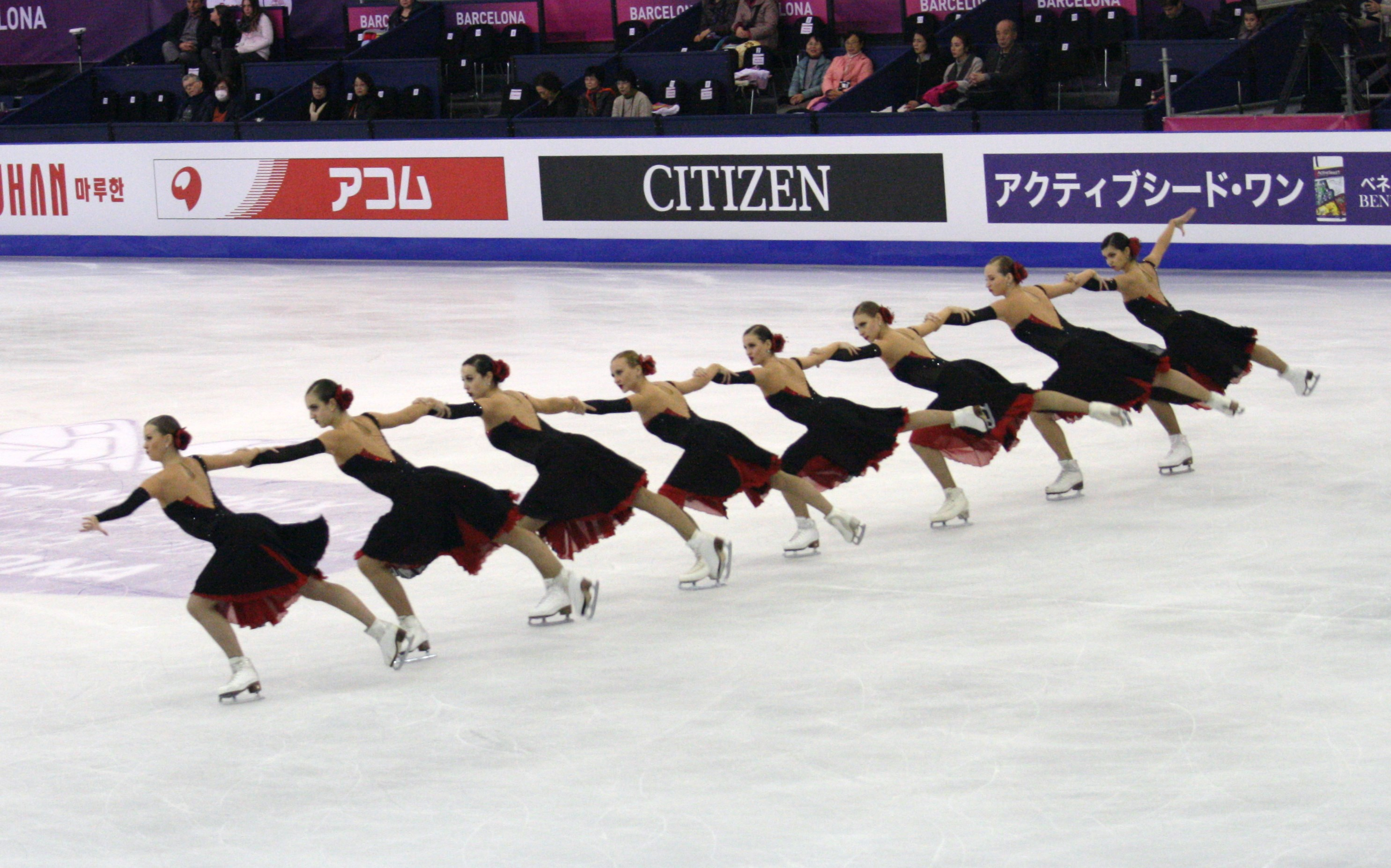
Team Paradise at 2015 Grand Prix performing a line

Lines are integral to many elements and transitions as they demonstrate the team's collective skating skills and serve as building blocks for both blocks and wheel formations. Lines can be connected and disconnected.

==== Wheel ====
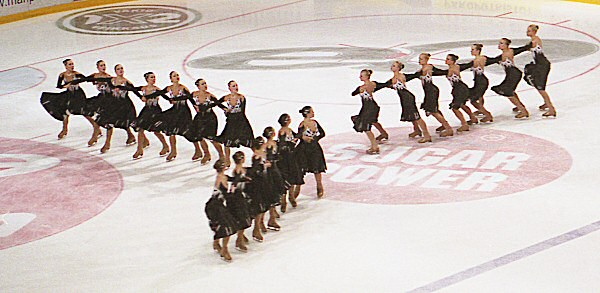
Marigold IceUnity performing a wheel

A wheel is characterized by every skater rotating around a common center point in connected lines. Different formations that teams can form including a two to five spoke or a parallel wheel. Each spoke (line) of the wheel should be straight and the team should be leaning into the center of the wheel. The difficulty of the wheel can be increased by adding footwork, changing the rotational direction of the wheel, configuration of the wheel.

=== Elements ===
Programs incorporate a set number of specific elements that is announced at the beginning of each season. Currently junior and senior teams both complete 5 elements in the short program, in the free skate junior teams attempt 8 elements, and senior teams attempt 10.

==== Artistic element ====
Done in either a circle/wheel formation, or a line/block formation, this element should be used to emphasize the music or theme of the program with no requirements for steps or changes of place.

==== Creative element ====
Selected each season, the creative element is intended to be a unique interpretation of the other defined elements or formations (e.g.: creative wheel, creative lift)

==== Group Lift element ====
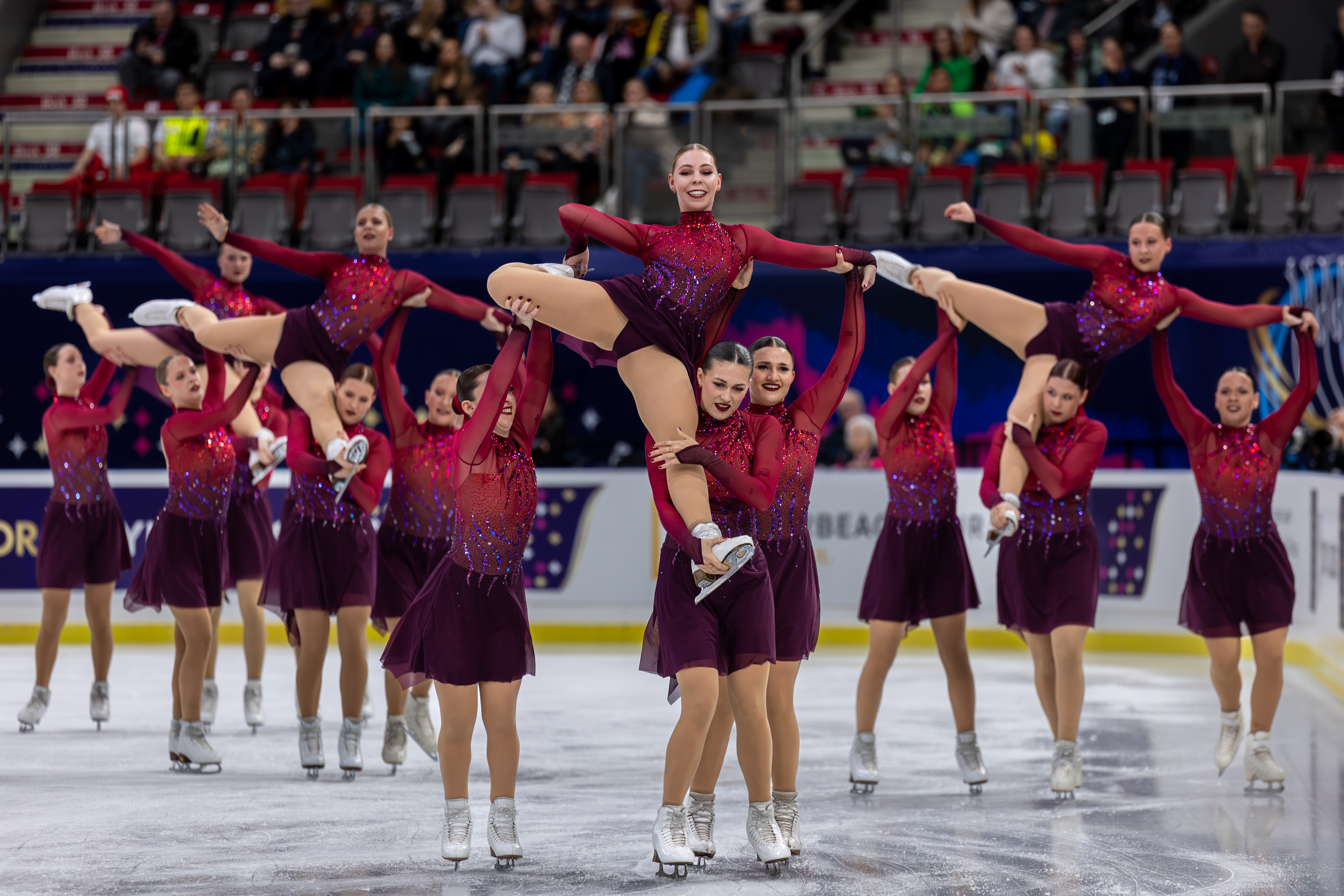
Team United Angels performing a group lift.

Incorporating all members of the team, skaters form different groups with each lifted skater supported by two or more teammates at any height. Group lifts can be classified as being ether gliding or rotational, with rotational lifts starting gliding then having the supporting skaters switch between forwards and backwards gliding to rotate the lifted skater.

==== Intersection element ====
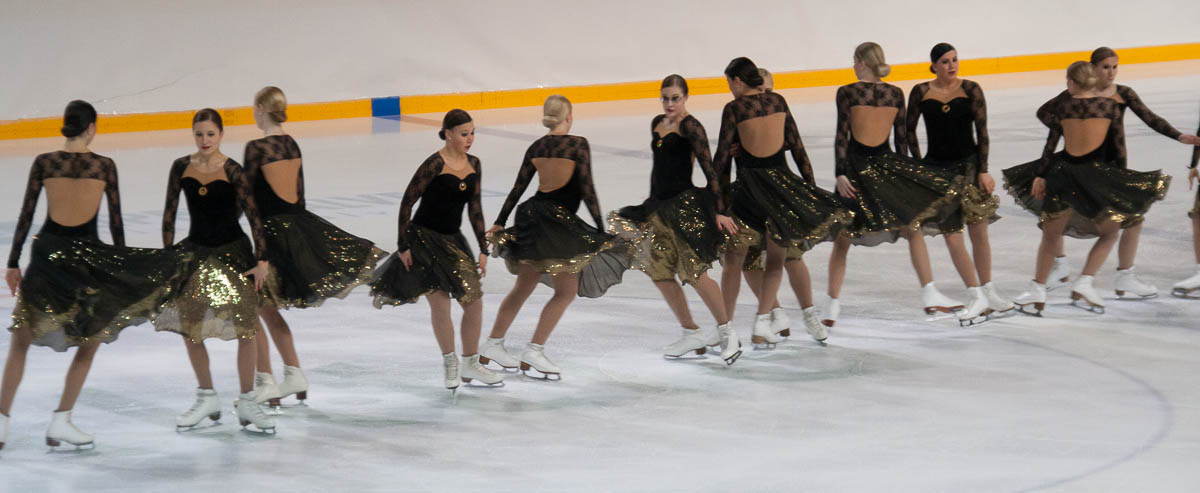
Golden Blades performing an intersection

An intersection, is when the skaters proceed towards each other in lines and intersect. The intersection can consist of two to four lines, with three and four line intersections forming a triangle or box shape before and after intersecting. The entry to the intersection can be made more difficult by executing various free skating or pair movements while forming the lines, or intersecting from an angle or a whip. The moment when the lines intersect is known as the point of intersection, here skaters do rotational turns or free skating movements to increase the level of difficulty.

==== Mixed element ====
Consisting of at least two separate element formations occurring simultaneously and interacting with each other. Some examples would be a circle within a wheel or line intersecting a block.

==== Move element ====
This element is a sequence of movements that must include free skating moves such as spirals, biellmanns, or 180's. The team can be split into units to execute additional features for levels of difficulty, such as ducking under each other's legs, changing edge, or transitioning from one position to another.

==== No hold element ====
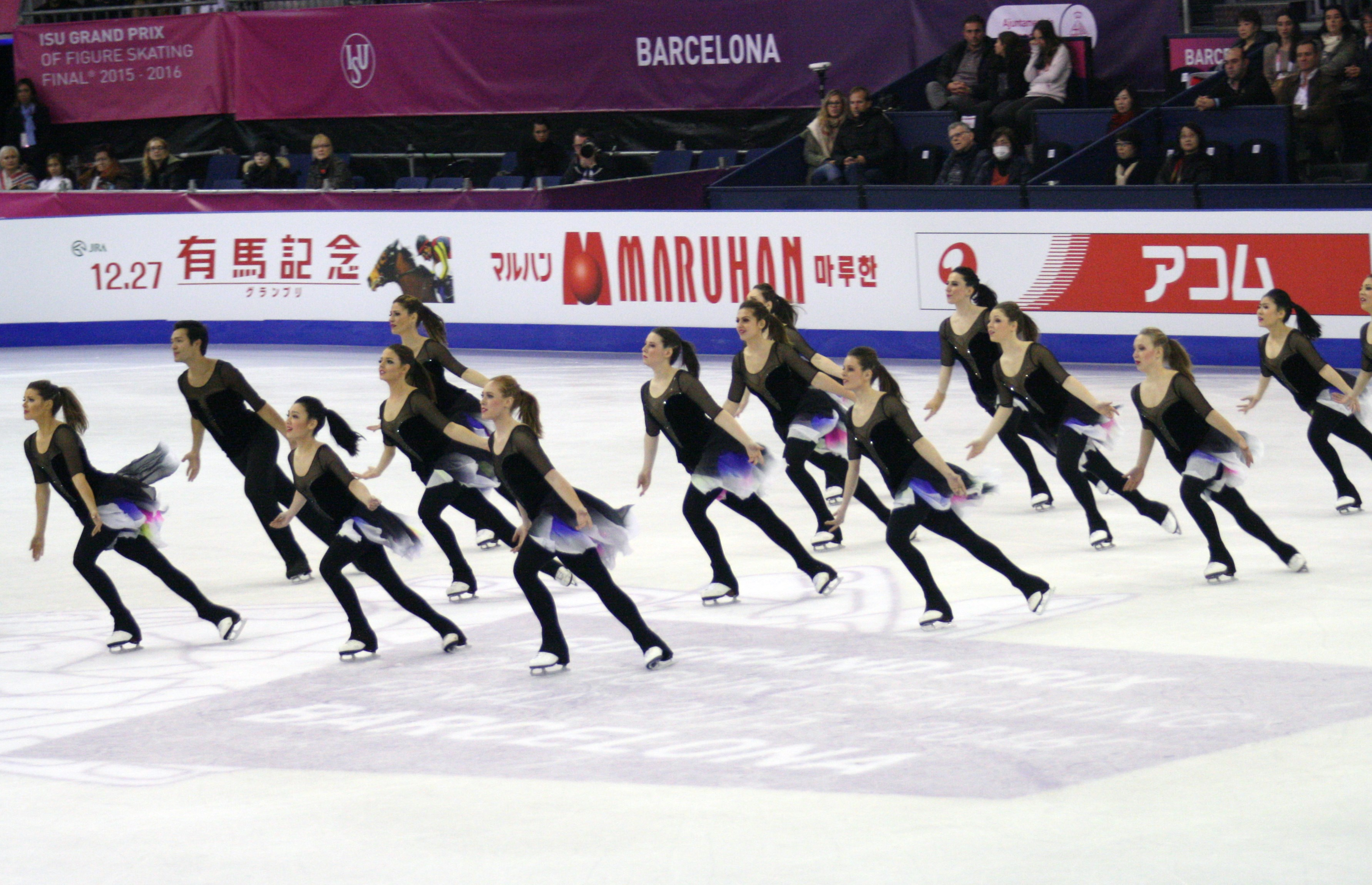
Nexxice at 2015 Grand Prix performing a no hold element

Done in a block formation, the skaters are disconnected but maintain even spacing while executing step sequences and changes of configuration.

==== Pair element ====
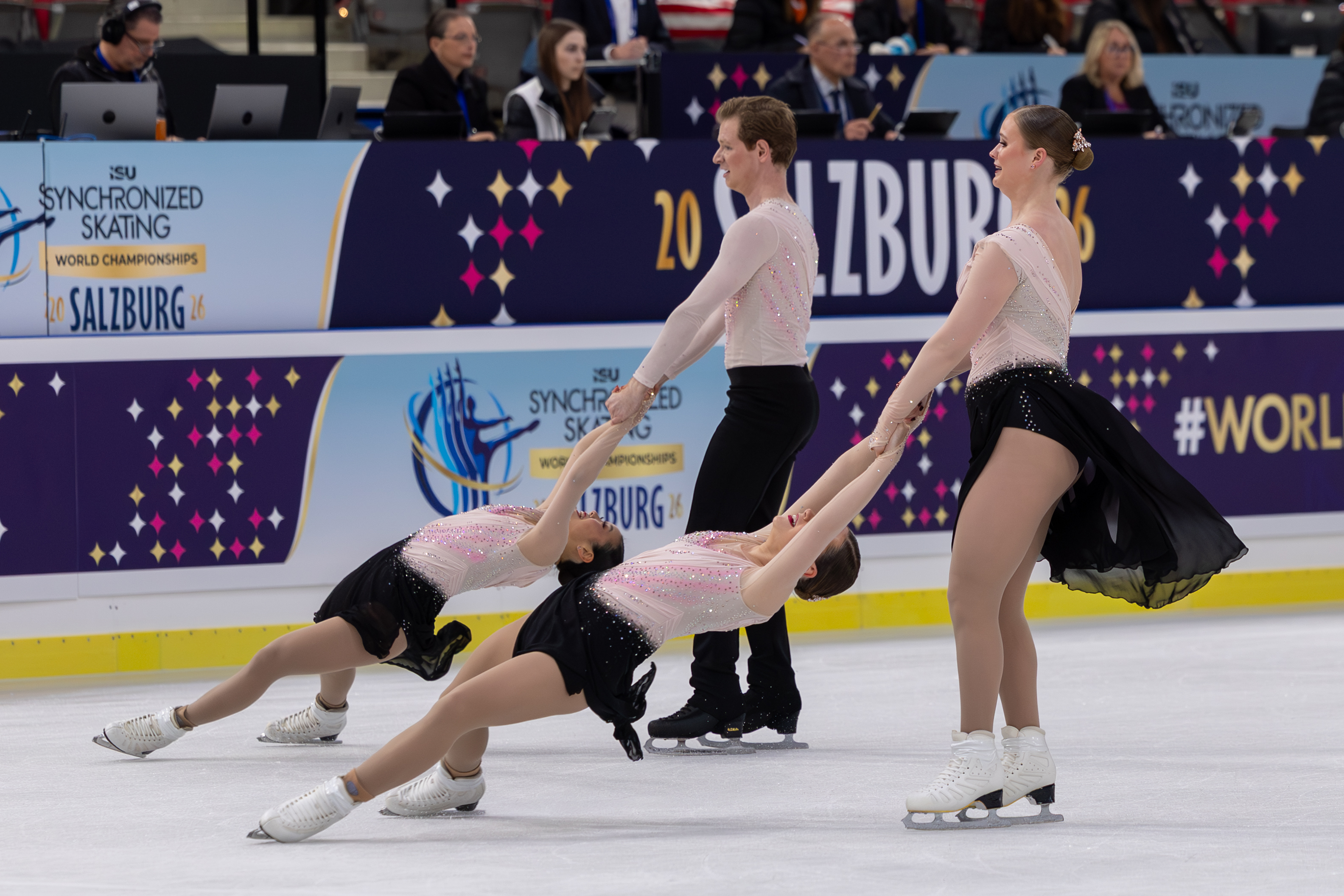
Haydenettes perform death spirals, a common pairs skating move

Incorporating all members of the team, skaters are paired to execute pairs moves, free skating moves, and or step sequences.

==== Pivoting and linear elements ====
Done in block, or line formations, programs can include both pivoting and linear elements though they would be done in separate shapes. Pivoting elements rotate around a common center point and must remain connected for the majority of the element while maintaining shape and even spacing. Linear elements need to progress across the ice, and can utilize changes of placement and configuration.

==== Synchronized spin element ====
Characterized by all members of the team, in either a solo or pairs spin. Positioned on the ice in any identifiable shape, with all skaters maintaining the same spin position simultaneously, and moving from one position to another as a team.

==== Traveling and rotating elements ====
Done in circle, or wheel formation, rotation is necessary in both elements. Programs can include both traveling and rotating elements though they would be done in separate shapes, if a program only includes one element both wheel and circle formations can be used as a change of formation for difficulty. Traveling elements are characterized by ice coverage during the element with the circle or wheel required to continually move a certain distance along a set path while rotating. Rotating elements remain stationary. Both elements can utilize changes of position, rotation, and configuration for higher levels of difficulty.

Jingu Ice Messengers performing the twizzle element

==== Twizzle element ====
Highlighting the twizzle turn, the team executes two to three twizzles, this element can be done in any identifiable formation. The skaters must execute their twizzles while maintaining the chosen shape or transitioning from one configuration to another, and rotating simultaneously. For added levels of difficulty teams can attempt the aforementioned change of place or configuration, different rotational directions for each twizzle, and certain difficult arm and free leg positions.

== Competitions ==
=== International ===
There are international synchronized skating competitions at the Senior, Junior, and Novice levels (with Senior being the most elite). The International Skating Union held the first official World Synchronized Skating Championships (WSSC) in 2000 in Minneapolis, Minnesota, USA. The top Junior teams from around the world competed from 2001 to 2012 at the ISU Junior World Challenge Cup (JWCC), held in a different location every year. The JWCC were accompanied in 2013 by the ISU World Junior Synchronized Skating Championships, to be held biannually in odd-numbered years with the JWCC in even-numbered years. Other long-running, major international events attracting elite teams at different levels include the French Cup, Spring Cup, Neuchâtel Trophy, Cup of Berlin, Zagreb Snowflakes Trophy, Leon Lurje Trophy and Prague Cup.

==== ISU World Synchronized Skating Championships ====
The ISU World Synchronized Skating Championships (WSSC) are the world championships for synchronized skating. Held since 2000, the WSSC is an annual international event organized by the International Skating Union. The top positions have been dominated by Finland, with three different World Champions (Marigold IceUnity, Rockettes and Team Unique) and 19 medals, and Sweden with the team (Team Surprise) with most World titles and medals for a single team (12 medals). Other major countries include Canada with five gold, four silvers and six bronzes (for NEXXICE, Les Suprêmes and the now-discontinued Black Ice), as well as Russia with three gold and one bronze (all by Team Paradise), also the United States with two silvers and five bronzes (for Miami University and Haydenettes).

Year	Location	Gold	Silver	Bronze	Source
2026	Salzburg, Austria	(Canada) Les Suprêmes	(United States) Haydenettes	(Finland) Rockettes	
2025	Helsinki, Finland	(Finland) Rockettes	(Finland) Team Unique	(United States) Haydenettes	
2024	Zagreb, Croatia	(Canada) Les Suprêmes	(United States) Haydenettes	(Finland) Rockettes	
2023	(United States) Lake Placid, USA	(Canada) Les Suprêmes	(Finland) Rockettes	(Finland) Team Unique	
2022	Hamilton, Canada	(Canada) Les Suprêmes	(Finland) Marigold IceUnity	(Finland) Rockettes	
2021	Hamilton, Canada	Event cancelled			
2020	(United States) Lake Placid, USA	Event cancelled			
2019	Helsinki, Finland	(Russia) Team Paradise	(Finland) Marigold IceUnity	(Finland) Rockettes	
2018	Stockholm, Sweden	(Finland) Marigold IceUnity	(Sweden) Team Surprise	(Russia) Team Paradise	
2017	(United States) Colorado Springs, USA	(Russia) Team Paradise	(Finland) Marigold IceUnity	(Canada) NEXXICE	
2016	Budapest, Hungary	(Russia) Team Paradise	(Finland) Rockettes	(United States) Haydenettes	
2015	Hamilton, Canada	(Canada) NEXXICE	(Finland) Marigold IceUnity	(Russia) Team Paradise	
2014	Courmayeur, Italy	(Finland) Marigold IceUnity	(Canada) NEXXICE	(Finland) Rockettes	
2013	(United States) Boston, USA	(Finland) Team Unique	(Canada) NEXXICE	(United States) Haydenettes	
2012	Gothenburg, Sweden	(Sweden) Team Surprise	(Canada) NEXXICE	(United States) Haydenettes	
2011	Helsinki, Finland	(Finland) Rockettes	(Finland) Marigold IceUnity	(United States) Haydenettes	
2010	(United States) Colorado Springs, USA	(Finland) Rockettes	(Finland) Marigold IceUnity	(United States) Haydenettes	
2009	Zagreb, Croatia	(Canada) NEXXICE	(Finland) Team Unique	(Sweden) Team Surprise	
2008	Budapest, Hungary	(Finland) Rockettes	(Sweden) Team Surprise	(Canada) NEXXICE	
2007	London, Canada	(Sweden) Team Surprise	(United States) Miami University	(Canada) NEXXICE	
2006	Prague, Czech Republic	(Finland) Marigold IceUnity	(Sweden) Team Surprise	(Finland) Rockettes	
2005	Gothenburg, Sweden	(Sweden) Team Surprise	(Finland) Rockettes	(Finland) Marigold IceUnity	
2004	Zagreb, Croatia	(Finland) Marigold IceUnity	(Sweden) Team Surprise	(Finland) Rockettes	
2003	Ottawa, Canada	(Sweden) Team Surprise	(Finland) Marigold IceUnity	(Canada) Les Suprêmes	
2002	Rouen, France	(Finland) Marigold IceUnity	(Sweden) Team Surprise	(Canada) black ice	
2001	Helsinki, Finland	(Sweden) Team Surprise	(Finland) Rockettes	(Canada) black ice	
2000	(United States) Minneapolis, USA	(Sweden) Team Surprise	(Canada) black ice	(Finland) Marigold IceUnity	

==== ISU World Junior Synchronized Skating Championships ====
Year	Location	Gold	Silver	Bronze	Source
2024	Neuchatel, Switzerland	(Canada) Les Suprêmes	(Finland) Team Fintastic	(United States) Skyliners	
2023	Angers, France	(Finland) Team Fintastic	(Canada) NEXXICE	(United States) Skyliners	
2022	Innsbruck, Austria	(Finland) Team Fintastic	(United States) Skyliners	(United States) Teams Elite	
2021	Lyon, France	Event Cancelled			
2020	Nottingham, United Kingdom	(Finland) Team Fintastic	(Russia) Team Junost	(Russia) Team Crystal Ice	
2019	Neuchatel, Switzerland	(Russia) Team Junost	(Russia) Team Crystal Ice	(United States) Team Skyliners	
2018	Zagreb, Croatia	(Russia) Team Junost	(United States) Team Skyliners	(Russia) Team Crystal Ice	
2017	Mississauga, Canada	(Russia) Team Junost	(Finland) Team Fintastic	(Finland) Musketeers	
2015	Zagreb, Croatia	(Finland) Musketeers	(Finland) Team Fintastic	(Canada) Les Suprêmes	
2013	Helsinki, Finland	(Finland) Musketeers	(Finland) Team Fintastic	(Russia) Spartak-Junost	

==== ISU Junior World Challenge Cup ====
The Junior World Challenge Cup was held bi-annually starting in 2013 alternating with the newly introduced World Junior Championships until being discontinued after the 2015–16 season.

Year	Location	Gold	Silver	Bronze	Source(s)
2016	Zagreb, Croatia	(Canada) Les Suprêmes	(Finland) Team Fintastic	(Russia) Team Junost	
2014	Neuchâtel, Switzerland	(Finland) Team Fintastic	(Canada) Les Suprêmes	(Finland) Musketeers	
2012	Gothenburg, Sweden	(Finland) Team Fintastic	(Finland) Musketeers	(Canada) Les Suprêmes	
2011	Neuchâtel, Switzerland	(Finland) Team Fintastic	(Finland) Musketeers	(United States) Team Braemar	
2010	Gothenburg, Sweden	(Finland) Team Fintastic	(Canada) NEXXICE	(Finland) Musketeers	
2009	Neuchâtel, Switzerland	(Finland) Team Fintastic	(Canada) NEXXICE	(Finland) Musketeers	
2008	Rouen, France	(Finland) Team Fintastic	(Canada) Gold Ice	(Finland) Musketeers	
2007	(United Kingdom) Nottingham, Great Britain	(Finland) Team Fintastic	(Canada) Les Suprêmes	(United States) Chicago Jazz	
2006	Helsinki, Finland	(Finland) Musketeers	(Finland) Team Fintastic	(United States) Chicago Jazz	
2005	Neuchâtel, Switzerland	(Finland) Musketeers	(Finland) Team Mystique	(Canada) Gold Ice	
2004	Milan, Italy	(Finland) Musketeers	(Finland) Team Mystique	(Canada) Gold Ice	
2003	Kungsbacka, Sweden	(Finland) Musketeers	(Canada) Burlington Ice Image	(Canada) Les Suprêmes	
2002	Zagreb, Croatia	(Canada) Ice Image	(Russia) Spartak-Leader	(Finland) Musketeers	
2001	Neuchâtel, Switzerland	(Finland) Team Fintastic	(Canada) Les Suprêmes	(United States) Superettes	

=== Finland ===
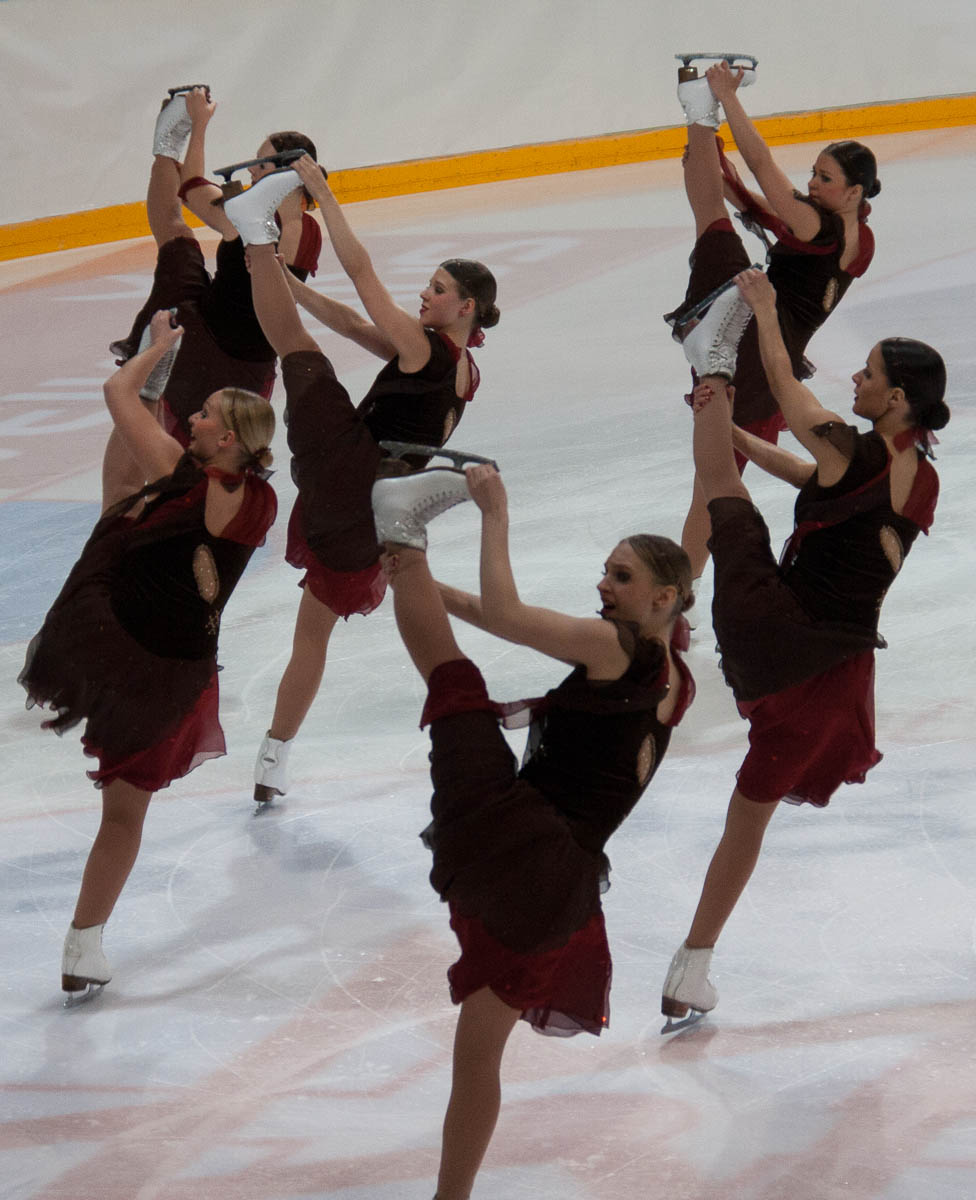
Team Unique 2013

The Finnish member of ISU, the Finnish Figure Skating Association, holds the Finnish Synchronized Skating Championships at the Novice, Junior and Senior levels. Also, it holds two Finnish Championships Qualifiers before the nationals. Since the late 1990s, the senior-level battle for the qualifier wins and Finnish Championship—and the ensuing ISU World Synchronized Skating Championships (WSSC) entries—has mainly been fought between three teams from Helsinki, Marigold IceUnity, Rockettes and Team Unique, while a fourth and sometimes a fifth Senior team has competed along in the intervening years.

==== Finnish Senior Championships medalists ====
Year	Location	Gold	Silver	Bronze	Source
2022	Helsinki	Team Unique	Rockettes	Marigold IceUnity	
2022	Tampere	Rockettes	Marigold IceUnity	Dream Edges	
2021	Helsinki	Rockettes	Team Unique	Marigold IceUnity	
2020	Espoo	Rockettes	Team Unique	Marigold IceUnity	
2019	Turku	Rockettes	Marigold IceUnity	Team Unique	
2018	Helsinki	Marigold IceUnity	Rockettes	Team Unique	
2017	Espoo	Team Unique	Marigold IceUnity	Rockettes	
2016	Helsinki	Team Unique	Marigold IceUnity	Rockettes	
2015	Tampere	Marigold IceUnity	Rockettes	Team Unique	
2014	Helsinki	Marigold IceUnity	Rockettes	Team Unique	
2013	Turku	Team Unique	Marigold IceUnity	Rockettes	
2012	Espoo	Rockettes	Marigold IceUnity	Team Unique	
2011	Espoo	Rockettes	Marigold IceUnity	Team Unique	
2010	Espoo	Rockettes	Marigold IceUnity	Team Unique	
2009	Helsinki	Marigold IceUnity	Team Unique	Rockettes	
2008	Helsinki	Rockettes	Marigold IceUnity	Team Unique	
2007	Helsinki	Marigold IceUnity	Team Unique	Rockettes	
2006	Helsinki	Marigold IceUnity	Rockettes	Team Unique	

==== Finnish qualifications for the ISU WSSC ====
Throughout the years, the Finnish senior teams qualifying for the World Championships have been selected based on their performance at the two qualifiers and the national championships. In the season 2012–13, the teams were selected as follows: the Finnish Champion qualified automatically as Team Finland 1 for the WSSC. Team Finland 2 at the WSSC was the team which earned the fewest points from the first qualifier, the second qualifier and the Finnish Championships. The points equaled the sum of the positions at the three competitions with growing coefficients: the coefficient was 0,3 for the first competition result, 0,5 for the second and 1 for the last.

=== United States ===
In the United States, there are several other recognized age and skill levels. Sanctioned by the US Figure Skating Association, the divisions include Aspire 1-4, Pre-Juvenile, Preliminary, Open Juvenile, Open Collegiate, Open Adult, and Open Masters (the non-qualifying divisions/ the divisions that do not go to Nationals) and Juvenile, Intermediate, Novice, Junior, Senior, Collegiate, Adult, and Masters (qualifying levels).

ISI (Ice Skating Institute) is another governing body which focuses on a more recreational form of competition and does not have the same divisions as those of the USFSA. Teams can compete in the Tot Jr. Youth, Youth Sr. Youth, Teen, Collegiate, Adult, or Master age groups, in any of five categories: Formation, Advanced Formation, Skating, Open Skating, and Dance.

While most skaters participating in synchronized skating are female, the rules allow mixed-gender teams.

==== US Figure Skating Senior Championship ====
The Senior team level consists of 16 skaters. Skaters must be at least 15 years old and have passed the Novice Moves in the Field test.

Year	Location	Gold	Score	Silver	Score	Bronze	Score	Pewter	Score	Source
2020	Providence, Rhode Island	Haydenettes	203.19	Skyliners	194.94	Crystallettes	193.09	Miami University	192.39	
2019	Plymouth, Michigan	Haydenettes	226.37	Skyliners	218.14	Crystallettes	201.63	Miami University	196.95	
2018	Portland, Oregon	Haydenettes	204.05	Skyliners	185.86	Miami University	182.99	Crystalettes	166.89	
2017	Rockford, Illinois	Haydenettes	208.83	Crystallettes	189.50	Skyliners	172.96	Miami University	172.84	
2016	Kalamazoo, Michigan	Haydenettes	202.26	Miami University	183.86	Skyliners	169.47	Crystallettes	166.96	
2015	Providence, Rhode Island	Haydenettes	210.55	Miami University	194.70	Skyliners	178.99	Crystallettes	173.78	
2014	Colorado Springs, Colorado	Haydenettes	205.02	Crystallettes	179.77	Starlights	154.90	Miami University	149.64	
2013	Plymouth, Michigan	Haydenettes	206.33	Miami University	191.28	Crystallettes	176.96	Skyliners	151.56	
2012	Worcester, Massachusetts	Haydenettes	202.92	Crystallettes	185.54	Miami University	182.64	ICE'Kateers	145.15	
2011	Ontario, California	Haydenettes	217.41	Miami University	195.50	Crystallettes	179.85	California Gold		
2010	Minneapolis, Minnesota	Haydenettes	231.14	Crystallettes	210.35	Miami University	202.68	Starlights	167.80	
2009	Portland, Maine	Miami University	204.72	Haydenettes	203.97	Crystallettes	184.10	California Gold		
2008	Providence, Rhode Island	Haydenettes	213.37	Miami University	201.26	Crystallettes	184.10	California Gold		
2007	Colorado Springs, Colorado	Haydenettes	201.04	Miami University	199.56	Crystallettes	159.65	California Gold	158.06	
2006	Grand Rapids, Michigan	Miami University	179.72	Haydenettes	161.28	Crystallettes	155.12	Team Elan	126.96	
2005	Lowell, Massachusetts	Haydenettes	*	Miami University	*	Crystallettes	*	Team Elan	*	
2004	San Diego, California	Haydenettes	*	Crystallettes	*	Team Elan	*	Miami University	*	
2003	Huntsville, Alabama	Haydenettes	*	Miami University	*	Team Elan	*	Crystallettes	*	
2002	Lake Placid, New York	Haydenettes	*	Miami University	*	Crystallettes	*			
2001	Colorado Springs, Colorado	Haydenettes	*	Miami University	*	Crystallettes	*			
2000	Plymouth, Michigan	Haydenettes	*	Team Elan	*	Miami University	*			
1999	Tampa, Florida	Miami University	*	Haydenettes	*	Starlets				
1998	San Diego, California	Haydenettes		Miami University		Team Elan	*			
1997	Syracuse, New York	Haydenettes	*	Team Elan	*	Miami University	*			
1996	Chicago, Illinois	Haydenettes	*	Miami University	*	Team Elan	*			
1995	San Diego, California	Team Elan	*	Haydenettes	*	Miami University	*			
1994	Providence, Rhode Island	Haydenettes	*	Team Elan	*	Miami University	*			
1993	Detroit, Michigan	Haydenettes	*	Team Elan	*	Crystallettes	*			
1992	Portland, Maine	Haydenettes	*	Team Elan	*	Goldenettes	*			
1991	Anchorage, Alaska	Haydenettes	*	Goldenettes	*	Fraserettes	*			
1990	Houston, Texas	Goldenettes	*	Haydenettes	*	Fraserettes	*			
1989	Providence, Rhode Island	Haydenettes	*	Goldenettes	*	Detroit Capets	*			
1988	Reno, Nevada	Haydenettes	*	Fraserettes	*	Detroit Capets	*			
1987	Tulsa, Oklahoma	Fraserettes	*	Haydenettes	*	Figurettes	*			
1986	Boston, Massachusetts	Hot Fudge Sundaes	*	Haydenettes	*	Detroit Capets	*			
1985	Lakewood, Ohio	Fraserettes	*	Ice Crystallettes	*	Minneapplettes	*			
1984	Bowling Green, Ohio	Fraserettes	*	Ice Crystallettes	*		*			

==== USFSA Collegiate Championship ====
The Collegiate team level consists of teams with 12–20 Figure skaters who must be enrolled in a college or degree program as full-time students. Skaters must also have passed the Juvenile Moves in the Field test. It is a Varsity Sport at colleges such as Miami University and Adrian College. Many more have developed club-level collegiate teams without varsity status such as the team at The University of Delaware and the University of Michigan. The Miami University Synchronized Skating Team has been a trailblazer in collegiate synchronized skating, fielding the first completely funded varsity synchronized skating program in the United States, as well as working towards gaining "Synchro" NCAA status in the United States.

Year	Location	Gold	Score	Silver	Score	Bronze	Score	Pewter	Score	Source
2023	Peoria, IL	Miami University	104.61	Univ of Michigan	92.61	Western Michigan	91.43	Trine University	90.58	
2022	Colorado Springs, CO	Miami University	116.95	Adrian College	105.74	Western Michigan	104.30	Univ of Michigan	97.95	
2020	Providence, RI	Univ of Michigan	106.49	Adrian College	97.35	Miami University	92.81	University of Delaware	80.85	
2019	Plymouth, MI	Miami University	104.86	Western Michigan	95.92	Univ of Michigan	91.67	Adrian College	87.44	
2018	Portland, OR	Univ of Michigan	91.48	Adrian College	84.84	Miami University	83.53	Michigan State	70.52	
2017	Rockford, IL	Univ of Michigan	88.22	Miami University	86.40	Michigan State	75.66	Metroettes	75.31	
2016	Kalamazoo, MI	Miami University	90.12	Univ of Michigan	86.28	Metroettes	82.15	Western Michigan	81.76	
2015	Providence, RI	Miami University	94.12	Univ of Michigan	85.69	Metroettes	84.25			
2014	Colorado Springs, CO	Miami University	96.80	Team Excel	78.77	Michigan State	78.60	Univ of Michigan		
2013	Plymouth, MI	Miami University	92.26	Univ of Delaware	84.11	Univ of Michigan	77.98			
2012	Worcester, MA	Miami University	87.80	Univ of Delaware	84.29	Univ of Michigan	80.83			
2011	Ontario, CA	Miami University	96.16	Michigan State	85.17	Univ of Michigan	83.96			
2010	Minneapolis, MN	Miami University	107.60	Univ of Michigan	98.46	Univ of Delaware	94.97			
2009	Portland, ME	Miami University	100.63	Univ of Illinois	86.79	Michigan State	85.79			
2008	Providence, RI	Miami University	107.46	Univ of Delaware	97.77	Michigan State	87.11	Univ of Michigan		
2007	Colorado Springs, CO	Miami University	102.61	Michigan State	92.17	Univ of Delaware	88.74			
2006	Grand Rapids, MI	Miami University		Western Michigan		Univ of Delaware				
2005	Lowell, MA	Miami University		Western Michigan		Michigan State		Univ of Michigan		
2004	San Diego, CA	Western Michigan		Miami University		Univ of Delaware				
2003	Huntsville, AL	Miami University		Western Michigan		Univ of Michigan		Univ of Michigan		
2002	Lake Placid, NY	Miami University		Michigan State		Western Michigan		Univ of Michigan		
2001	Colorado Springs, CO	Miami University		Western Michigan		Michigan State				
2000	Plymouth, MI	Miami University		Univ of Delaware		Univ of Michigan				
1999	Tampa, FL	Univ of Michigan		Miami University		Univ of Delaware				
1998	San Diego, CA	Miami University		Michigan State		Bowling Green		Univ of Michigan		
1997	Syracuse, NY	Miami University		Bowling Green		Western Michigan				

=== Canada ===
The Canadian Synchronized Skating Championships were annual synchronized skating events, sanctioned by the Skate Canada, held to determine the national champions of Canada. They were first held in 1983. Since 2000, it is during these events that the senior teams can qualify for the ISU World Synchronized Skating Championships. Since 2023, the Junior and Senior level teams are competing in the combined synchronized and figure skating championships, held as a single event known as the Canadian National Skating Championships.

== Present day ==
=== Why not Synchro petition ===
In 2007 synchronized skating was selected to be part of the Universiade or World University Games as a demonstration sport. Teams from several countries competed in Turin, Italy with Sweden, Finland, and Russia coming out on top.

Prior to the sport's Olympic addition, "Why Not Synchro" became an ongoing campaign on social media through the hashtag #whynotsynchro and #whynotsynchro2018 on Facebook, Twitter, and Instagram, and was popularized at the Mozart Cup, held in Austria in January 2014. During the medal ceremonies, teams gathered on the ice and created the shape of the Olympic rings. This image was then shared over social media as skaters petitioned to raise awareness of the sport. A petition to the International Olympic Committee was posted on change.org calling for 15,000 signatures and asking the IOC "Synchronized Figure Skating: Make it an Olympic Event." The petition stated "The time has come to add this incredible event to the pinnacle of the sport of figure skating."

Although not previously an Olympic sport, in 2026 it was officially added to the Youth Olympic Games, and on July 7th, 2026, the IOC announced that synchronized figure skating would be making its Olympic debut in the 2030 Winter Olympic Games in the French Alps. However, instead of the usual 8-20 skaters, the event will consist of 9 skaters, and will be known as Synchro9.

=== Effects of COVID-19 ===
Due to the COVID-19 pandemic, the 2019–2020 season was cut short to ensure the safety of all teams. Elite US teams, such as the Haydenettes, Skyliners and Miami university, were not able to compete internationally due to travel restrictions set in place in late March and early April 2020. The US Figure Skating Association is responsible for the health and well-being of the athletes and members.

== Judging ==
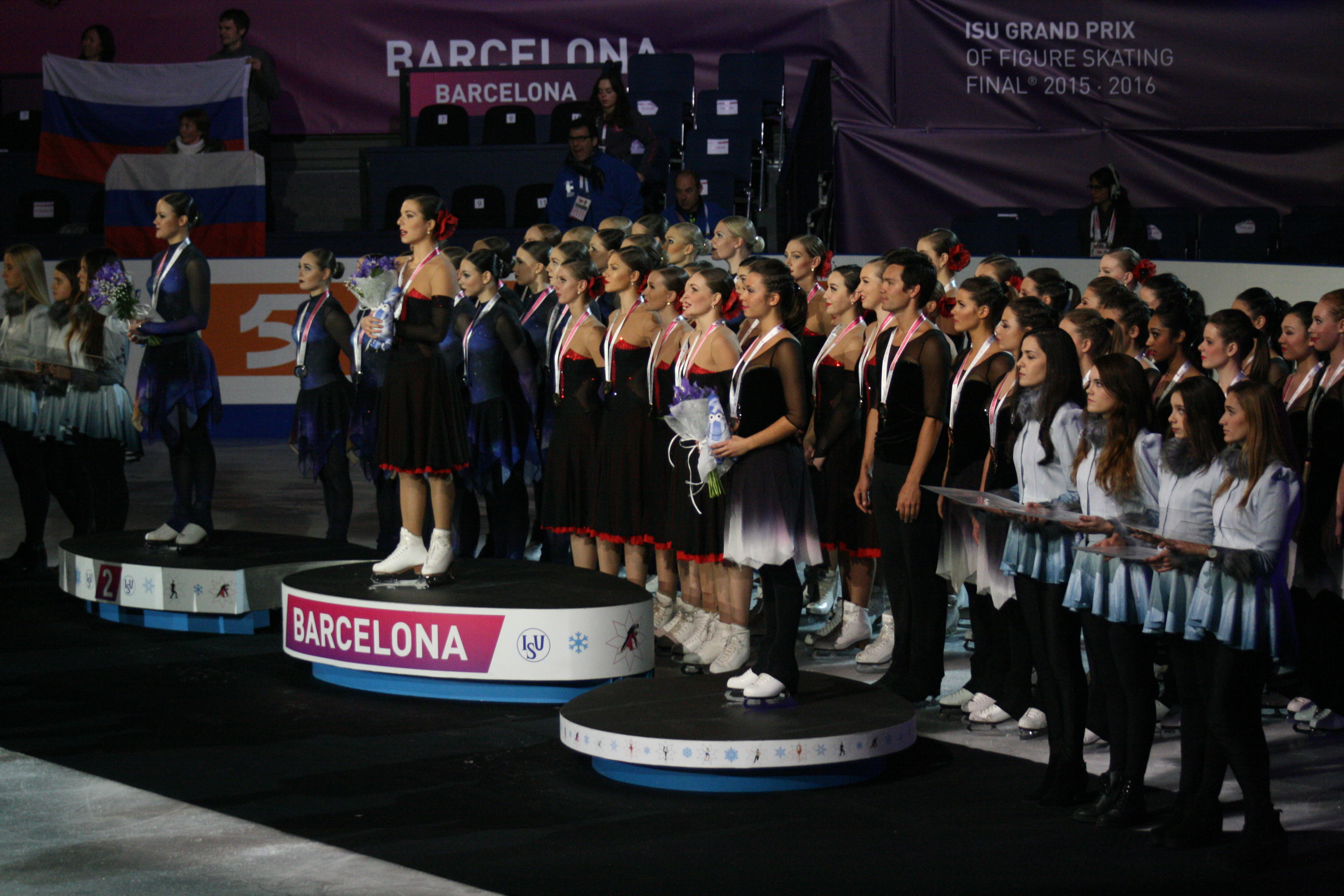
2015 Grand Prix Synchronized Skating Medal Ceremonies.

=== International IJS System ===
The competitive levels of synchronized skating, like those in other disciplines of Figure skating, are now judged using the ISU Judging System that was introduced in 2004. Each element is assigned a difficulty level by the technical panel made up of a technical specialist, assistant technical specialist and a technical controller. Each level of difficulty for a particular element corresponds to a pre-determined base value. The base value is the number of points that are awarded for an executed element before the grade of execution or any deductions are applied. Judges assign a grade of execution from -3 to +3 to each of the elements. Each grade of execution, or GOE, corresponds to a point value. For each element, the highest and lowest GOE values are dropped and the rest are averaged then added to the base value. The sum of all the scores of the elements comprises the Technical Elements score.

==== Program Component Score ====
The judges will award points on a scale from 0.25 to 10 (in increments of 0.25) for three program components to grade overall presentation. As with Grade of Execution (GOEs), the highest and lowest scores for each component are thrown out, and the remaining scores are averaged. The final program components scores are then multiplied by a set factor to ensure the technical score and program components score are balanced.

The three program components are:

- Skating Skills - The ability of the skater to execute the skating repertoire of steps, turns and skating movements with blade and body control.
- Performance - The demonstration of engagement, commitment and involvement based on an understanding of the music and composition.
- Composition - The intentional, developed and/or original arrangement of the repertoire and all types of movements into a meaningful whole according to the principles of proportion, unity, space, pattern, and musical structure.

==== Technical Score ====
Each element of the program is assigned a base value, which gives skaters credit for every element they perform. Some elements, such as spins and step sequences, have levels of difficulty on which the base values are established. Judges grade the quality of each element using a grade of execution score within a range of −5 to +5, which is added to or deducted from the base value. GOEs are proportional to the base value of each element. The highest and lowest scores for each element are thrown out, and the remaining scores are averaged to determine the final GOE for each element. The GOE is then added to or subtracted from the base value for each element, and the sum of the scores for all elements forms the technical score.

==== Segment Score ====
The technical score is added to the program components score to determine the segment score (short program/rhythm dance or free skate/dance). The scores for each segment are then added together to determine the competition score. The skater with the highest competition score is declared the winner. In the event of a tie, the team with the highest free program score wins the competition. The IJS is used at events in the national qualifying structure including the U.S. Championships as well as many local competitions at the juvenile through senior levels, including Excel.

=== 6.0 System ===
Until the implementation of the IJS system in 2004, all synchronized skating utilized the 6.0 scoring system.

Prior to 2026 In the United States, the introductory levels of Aspire 1-4, Open Juvenile, Open Collegiate, Open Adult, and Open Masters judged under the 6.0 judging system. The basic principle of the 6.0 system is a "majority" system. Each event was judged by an odd number of judges, and the winner of the event was the team placed highest by a majority of these judges.

The 6.0 system was officially retired in the US in June of 2026

=== Differences in Judging Systems ===
The IJS is based on cumulative points rather than the 6.0 standard of marks and placement. The IJS focuses on the skaters and not the judges. Judges do not have to use their memory to compare all aspects of every skater and figure out where to place them, but simply evaluate the qualities of each performance.

=== Highest scores at ISU competitions ===
==== Short program ====
Rank	Team	Score	Event	Source
1	(Canada) Les Suprêmes	84.61	Marie Lundmark Trophy 2026	
2	(Finland) Team Unique	83.05	Britannia Cup 2026	
3	(Finland) Rockettes	83.04	Marie Lundmark Trophy 2026	
4	(Russia) Paradise	81.53	Leon Lurje Trophy 2020	
5	(Finland) Fintastic	80.53	Junior Worlds 2026	

==== Free skating ====
Rank	Team	Score	Event	Source
1	(Canada) Les Suprêmes	161.98	Worlds 2023	
2	(Finland) Team Unique	161.55	Worlds 2023	
3	(Finland) Rockettes	161.09	Leon Lurje Trophy 2023	
4	(United States) Haydenettes	157.11	Worlds 2024	
5	(Canada) NEXXICE	155.91	Worlds 2023	

==== Combined total ====
Rank	Team	Score	Event	Source
1	(Canada) Les Suprêmes	240.98	Worlds 2023	
2	(Finland) Rockettes	239.56	Worlds 2023	
3	(Finland) Team Unique	237.68	Worlds 2023	
4	(United States) Haydenettes	234.66	Hevelius Cup 2024	
5	(Finland) Marigold IceUnity	232.29	Spring Cup 2020	
