= 2025–26 synchronized skating season =

- Date: July 1, 2025 – June 30, 2026
- Previous: 2024–25
- Next: 2026–27

The 2025–26 synchronized skating season begin on November 28, 2025, and will end on April 12, 2026. Running concurrent with the 2025–26 figure skating season. During this season, elite synchronized skating teams will compete in the ISU Championship level at the 2026 World Championships, and through the Challenger Series. They will also be competing at various other elite level international and national competitions.

From March 1, 2022, onwards, the International Skating Union banned all athletes and officials from Russia and Belarus from attending any international competitions due to the 2022 Russian invasion of Ukraine.

== Competitions ==
The 2025–26 season currently includes the following major competitions.

Key

| ISU Championships | Challenger Series | Other international |

| Date | Event | Type | Level | Location | Details |
|---|---|---|---|---|---|
2025
| November 28 – 29 | French Cup | Other int | Sen. - Nov. | Rouen | Details |
| December 12 – 14 | Santa Claus Cup | Other int | Sen. - Nov. | Brno | Details |
2026
| January 9 – 10 | Britannia Cup | Challenger | Sen. - Jun. | Nottingham | Details |
| January 9 – 10 | Dresden Cup | Other int | Sen. - Nov. | Dresden | Details |
| January 15 – 17 | Hevelius Cup | Other int | Sen. - Nov. | Gdańsk | Details |
| January 16 – 18 | Spring Cup | Other int | Sen. - Nov. | Sesto San Giovanni | Details |
| January 22 – 24 | Lumiere Cup | Challenger | Sen. - Nov. | Eindhoven | Details |
| January 30 – 31 | U.S. Synchronized Skating International Classic | Challenger | Sen. - Jun. | Norwood | Details |
| February 7 – 8 | Marie Lundmark Trophy | Challenger | Sen. - Jun. | Turku | Details |
| February 12 – 15 | Riga Amber Cup | Other int | Sen. - Nov. | Riga | Details |
| March 13 – 14 | ISU World Junior Synchronized Skating Championships | ISU Championships | Junior | Gdańsk | Details |
| April 10 – 11 | ISU World Synchronized Skating Championships | ISU Championships | Senior | Salzburg | Details |
Type: ISU Champ. = ISU Championships; Challenger = Challenger Series; Other int. = International events except ISU Championships; Levels: Sen. = Senior; Jun. = Junior; Nov. = Novice TBA = To be announced

== International medalists ==
Championships
| Competition | Gold | Silver | Bronze | Results |
|---|---|---|---|---|
| Worlds | (Canada) Les Suprêmes | (United States) Haydenettes | (Finland) Helsinki Rockettes | |
| Junior Worlds | (Finland) Helsinki Fintastic | (Finland) Valley Bay Synchro | (United States) Skyliners | |

Challenger Series
| Competition | Gold | Silver | Bronze | Results |
|---|---|---|---|---|
| Britannia Cup | (Finland) Team Unique | (Finland) Helsinki Rockettes | (United States) Haydenettes | |
| Lumiere Cup | (Canada) Les Suprêmes | (Finland) Lumineers | (United States) Skyliners | |
| U.S. Synchronized Skating International Classic | (Finland) Marigold IceUnity | (United States) Haydenettes | (Canada) Nova | |
| Marie Lundmark Trophy | (Canada) Les Suprêmes | (Finland) Helsinki Rockettes | (Finland) Team Unique | |

Challenger Series Junior
| Competition | Gold | Silver | Bronze | Results |
|---|---|---|---|---|
| Britannia Cup | (United States) Teams Elite | (Finland) Dream Edges | (United States) Skyliners | |
| Lumiere Cup | (Finland) Helsinki Fintastic | (Finland) Valley Bay Synchro | (Canada) Les Suprêmes | |
| U.S. Synchronized Skating International Classic | (United States) Teams Elite | (United States) Skyliners | (United States) Lexettes | |
| Marie Lundmark Trophy | (Finland) Helsinki Fintastic | (Canada) Les Suprêmes | (Finland) Musketeers | |

Other International
| Competition | Level | Gold | Silver | Bronze | Results |
|---|---|---|---|---|---|
| French Cup | Senior | (Finland) Helsinki Rockettes | (United States) Haydenettes | (Germany) Berlin 1 | |
| French Cup | Junior | (Poland) Ice Fire | (Switzerland) Starlight | (Italy) Hot Shivers | |
| Santa Claus Cup | Senior | (Finland) Team Unique | (Finland) Lumineers | (Finland) Marigold IceUnity | |
| Santa Claus Cup | Junior | (United States) Teams Elite | (United States) Skyliners | (Finland) Musketeers | |
| Dresden Cup | Senior | (Sweden) Inspire | (Germany) United Angels | (Germany) Skating Graces | |
| Dresden Cup | Junior | (Finland) Helsinki Fintastic | (Finland) Valley Bay Synchro | (Finland) Stella Polaris | |
| Hevelius Cup | Senior | (Finland) Team Unique | (Finland) Lumineers | (Sweden) Inspire | |
| Hevelius Cup | Junior | (Finland) Dream Edges | (United States) Northernettes | (United States) Fond du Lac Blades | |
| Spring Cup | Senior | (Italy) Ice on Fire | (Italy) Hot Shivers | Not awarded | |
| Spring Cup | Junior | (Finland) Musketeers | (United States) Lexettes | (United States) Hockettes | |
| Riga Amber Cup | Senior | (Canada) Les Suprêmes | (Finland) Helsinki Rockettes | (United States) Skyliners | |
| Riga Amber Cup | Junior | (Canada) NEXXICE | (United States) Lexettes | (United States) DC EDGE | |
