= Japan Open =

Japan Open may refer to:

- Japan Open (badminton)
- Japan Open Golf Championship
- Japan Women's Open Golf Championship
- Japan Open (tennis)
- Japan Women's Open
- Japan Open (darts)
- Japan Open (figure skating)
- Japan Open (table tennis)
- Japan Open International Wheelchair Tennis Championships
