= Shinji Doigawa =

Japanese bobsledder (born 1979)

Shinji Doigawa (土井川 真二, Doigawa Shinji, born October 25, 1979) is a Japanese bobsledder who has competed since 1999. Competing in two Winter Olympics, he earned his best finish of 20th in the four-man event at Salt Lake City in 2002.

Kobayashi's best finish at the FIBT World Championships was 19th in the four-man event at Lake Placid, New York, in 2009. His best World Cup finish was 21st in a four-man event at Cesana in 2005.
