= Leon Lurje Trophy =

Synchronized skating competition

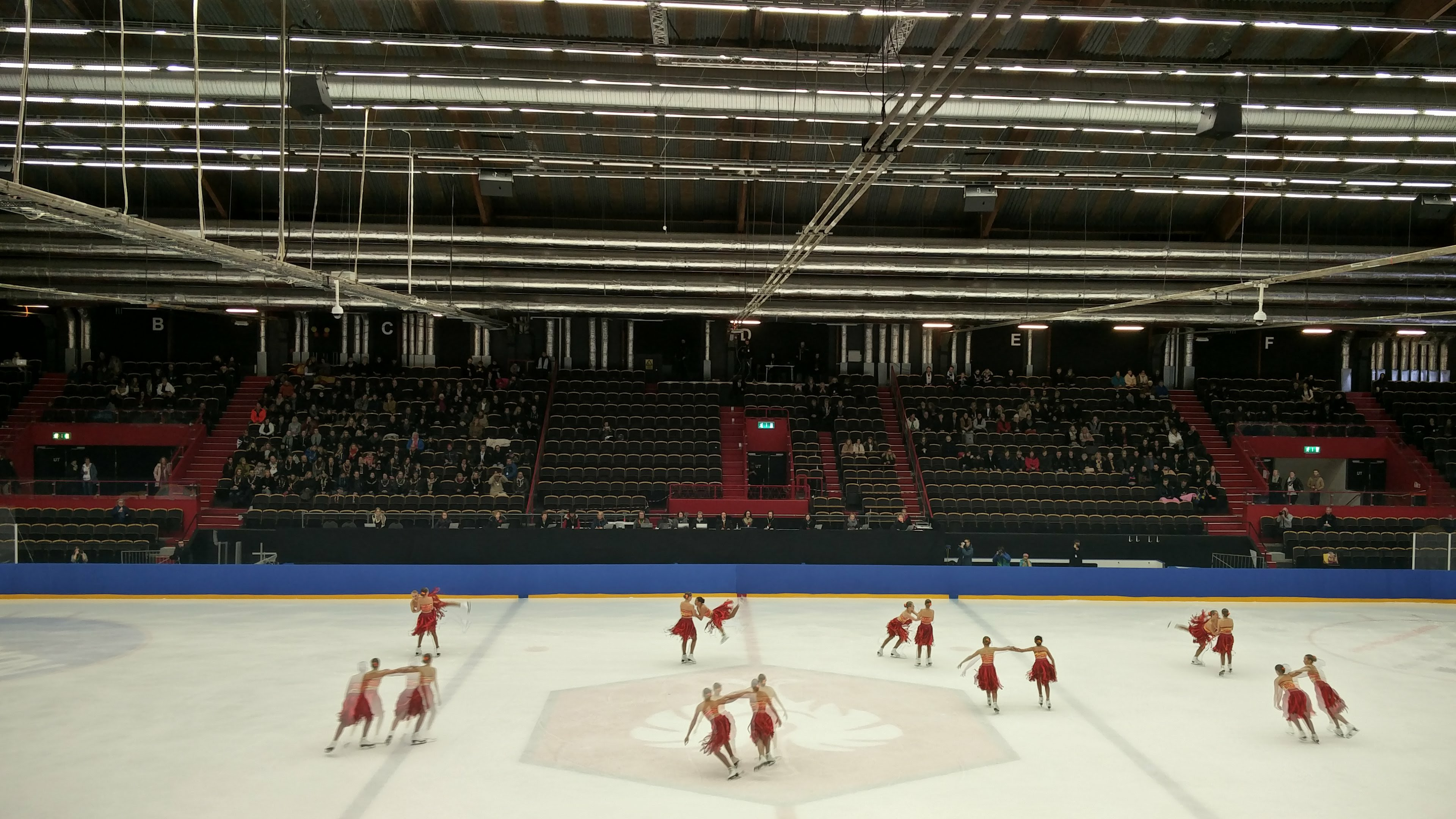
- Status: Active
- Genre: List of figure skating competitions
- Frequency: annually
- Location: Gothenburg, Sweden
- Inaugurated: 2007
- Website: www.skatesweden.se/engelska-sidor/leon-lurje-trophy

A team performing at Leon Lurje Trophy

Leon Lurje Trophy is an international synchronized skating event held in Gothenburg, Sweden every year. The competition is named after Leon Lurje, a Belarus born Swedish synchronized skater.

== Medalists ==
=== Senior teams ===
Year	Gold	Total	Silver	Total	Bronze	Total	Source(s)
2013	(Finland) Marigold IceUnity	174.48	(Sweden) Team Surprise	172.85	(United States) Miami University	148.33	
2014	(Finland) Team Unique	199.15	(Sweden) Team Surprise	181.77	(Sweden) Team Boomerang	172.19	
2015	(Sweden) Team Surprise	177.63	(Sweden) Team Boomerang	154.07	(United States) Starlights	143.13	
2016	(Finland) Rockettes	194.33	(United States) Haydenettes	193.32	(Canada) Les Suprêmes	181.91	
2017	(United States) Haydenettes	197.13	(Sweden) Team Surprise	192.11	(United States) Miami University	156.84	
2018	(Russia) Paradise	234.35	(Finland) Rockettes	225.13	(United States) Haydenettes	213.81	
2019	(Russia) Paradise	231.85	(Finland) Team Unique	227.61	(Russia) Team Crystal Ice	223.44	
2023	(Finland) Rockettes	238.35	(Finland) Marigold IceUnity	229.05	(Canada) Les Suprêmes	225.34	

=== Junior teams ===
Year	Gold	Total	Silver	Total	Bronze	Total	Source(s)
2013	(Sweden) Team Convivium	133.82	(Sweden) Team Spirit	127.08	(United States) Synchroettes	126.07	
2014	(Sweden) Team Convivium	156.45	(United States) Synchroettes	136.28	(Sweden) Team Spirit	136.07	
2015	(Sweden) Team Convivium	143.25	(Finland) FireBlades	137.85	(Sweden) Team Spirit	134.61	
2016	(Canada) Les Suprêmes	152.88	(Russia) Sunrise 1	149.03	(Canada) Les Pirouettes	129.50	
2017	(Russia) Sunrise 1	170.16	(United States) Lexettes	158.29	(Canada) NEXXICE	152.80	
2018	(Russia) Sunrise 1	196.08	(Finland) Team Fintastic	187.95	(United States) Starlights	180.04	
2019	(Russia) Sunrise 1	202.46	(Russia) Crystal Ice	196.81	(Finland) Team Fintastic	193.35	
2023	(Finland) Team Fintastic	197.19	(Canada) Les Suprêmes	187.89	(United States) Skyliners	182.29	
