= Suguru Kiyokawa =

Japanese bobsledder (born 1978)

Suguru Kiyokawa (清川 卓; born May 11, 1978 in Hobetsu, Hokkaido) is a Japanese bobsledder who has competed since 1997. He finished 27th in the two-man event at the 2006 Winter Olympics in Turin.
