= 2024–25 synchronized skating season =

- Date: July 1, 2024 – June 30, 2025
- Previous: 2023–24
- Next: 2025–26

The 2024–25 synchronized skating season begin on July 1, 2024, and will end on June 30, 2025. Running concurrent with the 2024–25 figure skating season. During this season, elite synchronized skating teams will compete in the ISU Championship level at the 2025 World Championships, and through the Challenger Series. They will also be competing at various other elite level international and national competitions.

From March 1, 2022, onwards, the International Skating Union banned all athletes and officials from Russia and Belarus from attending any international competitions due to the 2022 Russian invasion of Ukraine.

== Competitions ==
The 2024–25 season currently includes the following major competitions.

Key

ISU Championships	Challenger Series	Other international

Date	Event	Type	Level	Location	Details
2024
October 3 – 5	Shanghai Trophy	Other int	Senior	Shanghai	Details
December 13 – 15	Santa Claus Cup	Other int	Sen. - Nov.	Brno	Details
2025
January 16 – 18	Britannia Cup	Other int	Sen. - Nov.	Nottingham	Details
January 16 – 18	Mozart Cup	Challenger	Sen. - Jun.	Salzburg	Details
January 24 – 25	Dresden Cup	Challenger	Sen. - Jun.	Dresden	Details
Jan 31 – Feb 1	French Cup	Challenger	Sen. - Jun.	Rouen	Details
February 7 – 8	International Classic	Challenger	Sen. - Jun.	Norwood, Massachusetts	Details
February 13 – 16	Hevelius Cup	Other int	Sen. - Nov.	Gdansk	Details
February 14 – 16	Spring Cup	Other int	Sen. - Nov.	Sesto San Giovanni	Details
February 20 – 23	Lumière Cup	Other int	Sen. - Nov.	Eindhoven	Details
March 7 – 8	ISU World Junior Synchronized Skating Championships	ISU Championships	Junior	Gothenburg	Details
March 14 – 15	Budapest Cup	Other int	Sen. - Jun.	Budapest	Details
April 4 – 5	ISU World Synchronized Skating Championships	ISU Championships	Senior	Helsinki	Details
Type: ISU Champ. = ISU Championships; Other int. = International events except ISU Championships; Levels: Sen. = Senior; Jun. = Junior; Nov. = Novice TBA = To be announced

=== Cancelled Events ===
Date	Event	Type	Level	Location	Details
2025
January 9 – 12	Bosphorus Synchronized Cup	Other int	Sen. - Nov.	Istanbul	(Event cancelled)
February 6 – 8	Zagreb Snowflakes Trophy	Other int	Sen. - Nov.	Zagreb	(Event cancelled)
Type: ISU Champ. = ISU Championships; Other int. = International events except ISU Championships; Levels: Sen. = Senior; Jun. = Junior; Nov. = Novice

== International medalists ==
Championships
Competition	Gold	Silver	Bronze	Results
Worlds	(Finland) Helsinki Rockettes	(Finland) Team Unique	(United States) Haydenettes	
Junior Worlds	(United States) Teams Elite	(Finland) Team Fintastic	(United States) Skyliners	

Challenger Series
Competition	Gold	Silver	Bronze	Results
Mozart Cup	(Finland) Helsinki Rockettes	(Finland) Lumineers	(Italy) Ice on Fire	
Dresden Cup	(Finland) Marigold IceUnity	(Canada) Les Suprêmes	(United States) Haydenettes	
French Cup	(Finland) Marigold IceUnity	(Canada) NEXXICE	(Finland) Team Unique	
International Classic	(Canada) Les Suprêmes	(Finland) Team Unique	(United States) Haydenettes	

Challenger Series Junior
Competition	Gold	Silver	Bronze	Results
Mozart Cup	(Finland) Team Fintastic	(Finland) Valley Bay Synchro	(Sweden) Team Seaside	
Dresden Cup	(United States) Teams Elite	(Finland) Dream Edges	(Canada) Les Suprêmes	
French Cup	(Finland) Valley Bay Synchro	(Finland) Team Fintastic	(Canada) Team Nova	
International Classic	(United States) Teams Elite	(Canada) Les Suprêmes	(United States) Skyliners	

Other International
Competition	Gold	Silver	Bronze	Results
Shanghai Trophy	(Finland) Helsinki Rockettes	(Germany) Team Berlin 1	(Hungary) Team Passion	
Santa Claus Cup	(Finland) Team Unique	(Finland) Marigold IceUnity	(United States) Skyliners	
Britannia Cup	(Germany) Skating Graces	(United Kingdom) Team Icicles	(No other competitors)	
Hevelius Cup	(United States) Hayden Select	(United States) Teams Elite Elite 12	(Germany) Skating Graces	
Spring Cup	(Finland) Lumineers	(Italy) Ice on Fire	(Italy) Hot Shivers	
Lumière Cup	(Canada) Nova	(Canada) NEXXICE	(Switzerland) Starlight Elite	
Budapest Cup	(Canada) Les Suprêmes	(Hungary) Passion	(Czech Republic) Olympia	
