= All-Japan =

"All-Japan" (全日本, Zen Nihon,Zen Nippon) is a name given to championships or governing bodies that are based in Japan. It may also refer to:

== Combat sport ==
- All Japan Pro Wrestling
- All Japan Women's Pro-Wrestling
- All Japan Kendo Federation
- All Japan Ju-Jitsu International Federation
- Federation of All Japan Karatedo Organization
- All-Japan Judo Championships
- All Japan Judo Federation

== Football ==
- All Japan Senior Football Championship
- All Japan Women's Football Championship

== Motorsport ==
=== Cars ===
All series below are organised or recognised by JAF (Japan Automobile Federation)

- All Japan Sports Prototype Championship
- All-Japan Formula Three Championship
- All-Japan Formula 3000 Championship (1987-1995), former name of Formula Nippon
- All-Japan Grand Touring Car Championship, former name of Super GT
- All-Japan Professional Drift Championship, former name of D1 Grand Prix
- All-Japan Touring Car Championship, alternative name of Japanese Touring Car Championship
- JRMCA All-Japan National Championship

=== Motorcycles ===
All series are organized by MFJ (Motorcycle Federation of Japan)

- All Japan Road Race Championship

== Misc ==
- All-Japan Band Association
- All-Japan Rugby Football Championship
- Kurowashiki All Japan Volleyball Tournament
- All Japan Yakiniku Association
- All-Japan Figure Skating Championships
