= Hiroshi Suzuki (bobsledder) =

Japanese bobsledder (born 1973)

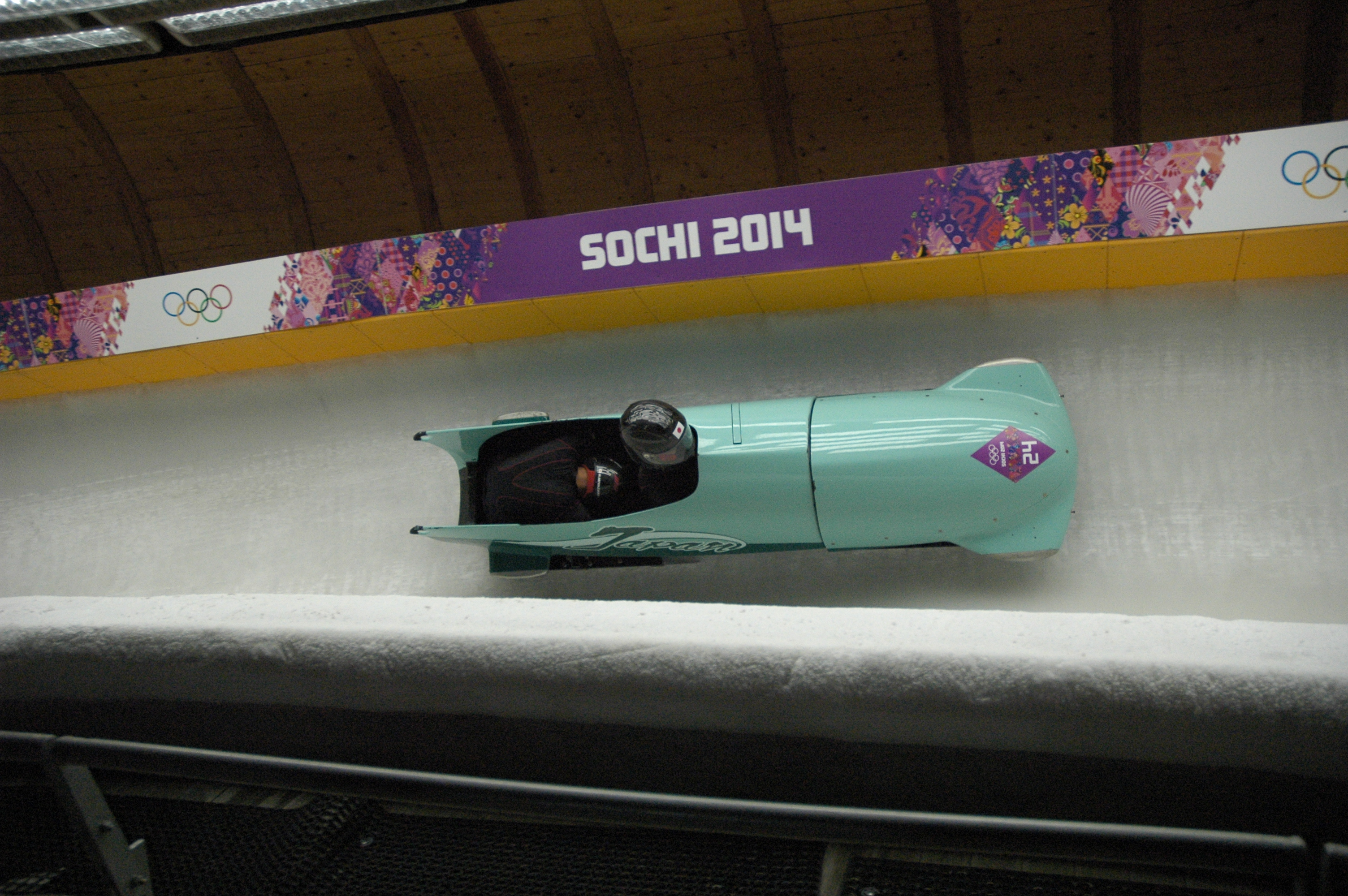
- Suzuki at the 2014 Winter Olympics

Sport
- Country: Japan
- Sport: Bobsleigh

Hiroshi Suzuki (鈴木 寛; born December 13, 1973) is a Japanese bobsledder who has competed since 1992. Competing in four Winter Olympics, he earned his best finish of 18th in both the two-man and four-man events at Lillehammer in 1994. Suzuki was eligible to compete for the 2006 Winter Olympics for Japan, but lost out to fellow bobsledder Suguru Kiyokawa.

Suzuki's best finish at the FIBT World Championships was 19th in the four-man event at Lake Placid, New York, in 2009. His best World Cup finish was 21st on three occasions (twice in 2005, once in 2010).
