= November 2009 in sports =

<<	November 2009					>>
Su	Mo	Tu	We	Th	Fr	Sa
1	2	3	4	5	6	7
8	9	10	11	12	13	14
15	16	17	18	19	20	21
22	23	24	25	26	27	28
29	30
Science; Sports

This list shows notable sports-related deaths, events, and notable outcomes that occurred in November of 2009.

== Deaths in November ==
- 24: Abe Pollin
- 16: Bobby Frankel
- 10: Robert Enke
- 9: Al Cervi

== Current sporting seasons ==
=== American football 2009 ===
- NFL
- NCAA Division I FBS

=== Auto racing 2009 ===
- V8 Supercar
- GP2 Asia Series

=== Basketball 2009 ===
- NBA
- NCAA Division I men
- NCAA Division I women
- Euroleague
- Eurocup
- EuroChallenge
- ASEAN Basketball League
- Australia
- France
- Germany
- Greece
- Iran
- Israel
- Italy
- Philippines
  - Philippine Cup
- Russia
- Spain
- Turkey

=== Cricket 2009–2010 ===
- Australia:
  - Sheffield Shield
  - Ford Ranger Cup
- Bangladesh:
  - National League
- India:
  - Ranji Trophy
- New Zealand:
  - Plunket Shield
- Pakistan:
  - Quaid-i-Azam Trophy
- South Africa:
  - SuperSport Series
- Sri Lanka:
  - Premier Trophy
- Zimbabwe:
  - Logan Cup

=== Football (soccer) 2009 ===
National teams competitions

- 2011 FIFA Women's World Cup qualification (UEFA)
- 2011 AFC Asian Cup qualification

International clubs competitions

- UEFA (Europe) Champions League
- Europa League
- UEFA Women's Champions League
- Copa Sudamericana
- CAF Confederation Cup
- CONCACAF (North & Central America) Champions League
- OFC (Oceania) Champions League

Domestic (national) competitions

- Argentina
- Australia
- Brazil
- England
- France
- Germany
- Iran
- Italy
- Japan
- Scotland
- Spain

=== Ice hockey 2009 ===
- National Hockey League

=== Rugby union 2009 ===
- Heineken Cup
- Amlin Challenge Cup
- English Premiership
- Celtic League
- LV= Cup
- Top 14

=== Winter sports ===
- Alpine Skiing World Cup
- Bobsleigh World Cup
- Cross-Country Skiing World Cup
- Grand Prix of Figure Skating
- Luge World Cup
- Nordic Combined World Cup
- Skeleton World Cup
- Ski Jumping World Cup
- Snowboarding World Cup
- Speed Skating World Cup

== Days of the month ==
=== November 30, 2009 (Monday) ===
==== American football ====
- NFL Monday Night Football Week 12 (unbeaten team in **bold**):
  - **New Orleans Saints** 38, New England Patriots 17

==== Tennis ====
- Serena Williams is fined US$82,500 for her tirade at a lineswoman during the 2009 US Open, and faces a suspension from that tournament if she commits another "major offense" at a Grand Slam event in 2010 or 2011. (AP via ESPN)

=== November 29, 2009 (Sunday) ===
==== Alpine skiing ====
- Men's World Cup in Lake Louise, Canada:
  - Super-G: (gold) Manuel Osborne-Paradis (CAN) (silver) Benjamin Raich (AUT) (bronze) Michael Walchhofer (AUT)
    - Overall standings after 4 of 34 races: (1) Didier Cuche (SUI) 226 points (2) Raich 165 (3) Carlo Janka (SUI) 160
- Women's World Cup in Aspen, USA:
  - Slalom: (gold) Šárka Záhrobská (CZE) (silver) Marlies Schild (AUT) (bronze) Kathrin Zettel (AUT)
    - Overall standings after 4 of 33 races: (1) Zettel 220 points (2) Maria Riesch (GER) 176 (3) Tanja Poutiainen (FIN) 165

==== American football ====
- NFL Week 12:
  - Indianapolis Colts 35, Houston Texans 27
    - Colts rally from a 13-point halftime deficit to score their 20th straight win, one short of the NFL record, and clinch the AFC South title.
  - Buffalo Bills 31, Miami Dolphins 14
  - Seattle Seahawks 27, St. Louis Rams 17
  - New York Jets 17, Carolina Panthers 6
  - Cincinnati Bengals 16, Cleveland Browns 7
  - Philadelphia Eagles 27, Washington Redskins 24
  - Atlanta Falcons 20, Tampa Bay Buccaneers 17
  - San Diego Chargers 43, Kansas City Chiefs 14
  - San Francisco 49ers 20, Jacksonville Jaguars 3
  - Tennessee Titans 20, Arizona Cardinals 17
  - Minnesota Vikings 36, Chicago Bears 10
  - Sunday Night Football: Baltimore Ravens 20, Pittsburgh Steelers 17 (overtime)
    - After missing a 56-yard field goal at the end of regulation, newly acquired kicker Billy Cundiff connects from 29 yards to win a crucial AFC North matchup.

==== Basketball ====
- NBA:
  - The New Jersey Nets fire head coach Lawrence Frank after an 0–16 start. Frank becomes the second NBA coach to be axed this season, after Byron Scott. (ESPN). Frank's assistant Tom Barrise takes his place, and guides the team in their 17th straight loss, 106–87 to the Los Angeles Lakers, which ties the 1988–89 Miami Heat and 1999 Los Angeles Clippers for the worst start to a season in NBA history.

==== Canadian football ====
- 97th Grey Cup game in Calgary:
  - Montreal Alouettes 28, Saskatchewan Roughriders 27: The Alouettes win on the final play of the game.

==== Cricket ====
- England in South Africa:
  - 4th ODI in Port Elizabeth:
    - South Africa 119 (36.5 overs); England 121/3 (31.2 overs). **England win by 7 wickets, lead the 5-match series 2–1**.

==== Cross-country skiing ====
- World Cup in Kuusamo, Finland:
  - Women's 10 km Classic: (gold) Aino-Kaisa Saarinen (FIN) (silver) Irina Khazova (RUS) (bronze) Vibeke Skofterud (NOR)
  - Men's 15 km Classic: (gold) Petter Northug (NOR) (silver) Maxim Vylegzhanin (RUS) (bronze) Alexander Legkov (RUS)

==== Field hockey ====
- Men's Champions Trophy in Melbourne, Australia:
  - South Korea 5–3 Germany
  - Netherlands 2–7 Australia
  - England 3–3 Spain
    - Standings: Australia 6 points, Germany, Korea, Netherlands 3, England, Spain 1.

==== Football (soccer) ====
- CAF Confederation Cup Finals, first leg:
  - ES Sétif (Algeria) 2–0 (Mali) Stade Malien
- OFC Champions League Group stage, Matchday 3:
  - Group B: Lautoka F.C. (Fiji) 1–2 (Vanuatu) Tafea FC
    - Standings: Tafea 7 points (3 matches), Lautoka 6 (3), PRK Hekari United 1 (2), Marist FC 0 (2).
- (Spain) La Liga, matchday 12:
  - El Clásico: Barcelona 1–0 Real Madrid
    - Standings: Barcelona 30 points, Real Madrid 28, Sevilla 26.
- (Ecuador) Ecuadorian Championship playoff, first leg:
  - Deportivo Cuenca 1–1 Deportivo Quito
- (Russia) Russian Premier League, final matchday: (teams in **bold** qualify for the Champions League, teams in italics qualify for the Europa League)
  - Standings: **Rubin Kazan** 63 points, **Spartak Moscow** 55, **Zenit St. Petersburg**, Lokomotiv Moscow 54, CSKA Moscow 52.

==== Golf ====
- Off-season men's events:
  - Omega Mission Hills World Cup in Shenzhen, China:
    - Winners: Francesco Molinari and Edoardo Molinari (ITA) 259 (−29)
      - The Molinaris are the first brothers to win the World Cup.

==== Horse racing ====
- Japan Cup in Tokyo:
  - Winner: Vodka (jockey: Christophe Lemaire, trainer: Katsuhiko Sumii)

==== Luge ====
- World Cup in Igls, Austria:
  - Men: (gold) Armin Zöggeler (ITA) 1:37.988 (silver) Wilfried Huber (ITA) 1:38.085 (bronze) Viktor Kneib (RUS) 1:38.091
    - Standings after 2 of 8 races: (1) Zöggeler 200 points (2) David Möller (GER) 131 (3) Felix Loch (GER) 120
  - Teams: (gold) Canada (Samuel Edney, Alex Gough, Chris Moffat/Mike Moffat) 2:10.864 (silver) Austria (Reinhard Egger, Nina Reithmayer, Andreas Linger/Wolfgang Linger) 2:11.868 (bronze) Latvia (Guntis Rēķis, Maija Tīruma, Andris Sics/Juris Sics) 2:12.094

==== Nordic combined ====
- World Cup in Kuusamo, Finland:
  - HS142 / 10 km: (gold) Hannu Manninen (FIN) (silver) Tino Edelmann (GER) (bronze) Eric Frenzel (GER)
    - Standing after 2 of 19 events: (1) Manninen 180 points (2) Jason Lamy Chappuis (FRA) 145 (3) Frenzel 120

==== Snooker ====
- Premier League Snooker – Final in Hopton-on-Sea, Norfolk
  - **Shaun Murphy** (ENG) def. Ronnie O'Sullivan (ENG) 7–3

==== Tennis ====
- ATP World Tour:
  - ATP World Tour Finals in London, United Kingdom:
    - Final: (6) **Nikolay Davydenko** (RUS) def. (5) Juan Martín del Potro (ARG) 6–3, 6–4
      - Davydenko wins his fifth title of the year and 19th of his career.
    - Doubles Final: **Bob Bryan/Mike Bryan** (USA) def. Max Mirnyi (BLR)/Andy Ram (ISR) 7–6(5), 6–3
      - The Bryan twins win the year-end tournament for the third time, and claim the year-end #1 ranking for the fifth time.

==== Weightlifting ====
- World Championships in Goyang, South Korea:
  - Men 105kg:
    - Total: (gold) Marcin Dołęga (POL) 421 kg (silver) Dmitry Lapikov (RUS) 416 kg (bronze) Albert Kuzilov (GEO) 408 kg
    - Snatch: (gold) Dołęga 195 kg (silver) Lapikov 194 kg (bronze) Kuzilov 187 kg
    - Clean & Jerk: (gold) Dołęga 226 kg (silver) Lapikov 222 kg (bronze) Kuzilov 221 kg
  - Men +105kg:
    - Total: (gold) An Yong-Kwon (KOR) 445 kg (silver) Artem Udachyn (UKR) 445 kg (bronze) Ihor Shymechko (UKR) 427 kg
    - Snatch: (gold) Shymechko 202 kg (silver) Udachyn 200 kg (bronze) An 198 kg
    - Clean & Jerk: (gold) An 247 kg (silver) Udachyn 245 kg (bronze) Andrey Kozlov (RUS) 231 kg

=== November 28, 2009 (Saturday) ===
==== American football ====
- NCAA Division I FBS:
  - BCS Top 10 (unbeaten teams in **bold**):
    - Florida–Florida State rivalry: (1) **Florida** 37, Florida State 10
      - The Gators will play #2 Alabama in the SEC Championship Game on December 5 with both teams unbeaten.
    - (4) **TCU** 51, New Mexico 10
      - The Horned Frogs complete a 12–0 regular season and all but clinch a BCS bowl bid.
    - Clean, Old-Fashioned Hate: Georgia 30, (7) Georgia Tech 24
    - Played earlier this week: (2) **Alabama**, (3) **Texas**, (5) **Cincinnati**, (6) **Boise State**, (9) Pittsburgh
    - Idle: (8) Oregon, (10) Ohio State
  - Other games:
    - Bedlam Series: Oklahoma 27, (12) Oklahoma State 0
    - Clemson–South Carolina rivalry: South Carolina 34, (18) Clemson 17
    - The Holy War: (19) Brigham Young 26, (21) Utah 23 (OT)
    - Carolina–NC State rivalry: North Carolina State 28, (24) North Carolina 27
    - Egg Bowl: Mississippi State 41, (25) Mississippi 27
- NCAA Division I FCS:
  - Playoffs, first round (seeds in parentheses):
    - (1) Montana 61, South Dakota State 48
      - The Grizzlies, down 48–21 late in the third quarter, score 40 unanswered points.
    - Stephen F. Austin 44, Eastern Washington 33
    - (4) Richmond 16, Elon 13
    - Appalachian State 20, South Carolina State 13
    - (2) Villanova 38, Holy Cross 28
    - New Hampshire 49, McNeese State 13
    - (3) Southern Illinois 48, Eastern Illinois 7
    - William & Mary 38, Weber State 0
  - Bayou Classic in New Orleans: Grambling State 31, Southern 13

==== Alpine skiing ====
- Men's World Cup in Lake Louise, Canada:
  - Downhill: (gold) Didier Cuche (SUI) 1:50.31 (silver) Werner Heel (ITA) 1:50.75 (bronze) Carlo Janka (SUI) 1:50.93
    - Cuche wins his second race of the season.
    - Overall standings after 3 of 34 races: (1) Cuche 200 points (2) Janka 120 (3) Ivica Kostelic (CRO) 115
- Women's World Cup in Aspen, USA:
  - Giant slalom: (gold) Kathrin Hölzl (GER) 2:09.63 (silver) Kathrin Zettel (AUT) 2:09.87 (bronze) Federica Brignone (ITA) 2:10.76
    - Overall standings after 3 of 33 races: (1) Tanja Poutiainen (FIN) 165 points (2) Zettel 160 (3) Hölzl 136
    - Giant slalom standings after 2 of 7 races: (1) Zettel 160 points (2) Hölzl 136 (3) Poutiainen 105

==== Canadian football ====
- CIS football championships:
  - Vanier Cup national championship game in Quebec City:
    - (4) Queen's Golden Gaels 33, (2) Calgary Dinos 31
      - The Gaels come back from a 25–7 halftime deficit to win their fourth Vanier Cup, and deny the Dinos quarterback Erik Glavic to become the fifth player to win the Hec Crighton Trophy Trophy and the Vanier Cup in the same year.

==== Cricket ====
- Pakistan in New Zealand:
  - 1st Test in Dunedin, day 5:
    - New Zealand 429 and 153; Pakistan 332 and 218. **New Zealand win by 32 runs, lead the 3-match series 1–0**.
- West Indies in Australia:
  - 1st Test in Woolloongabba, Brisbane, day 3:
    - Australia 480/8d; West Indies 228 and 187 (f/o, Adrian Barath 104). **Australia win by an innings and 65 runs, lead the 3-match series 1–0**.

==== Cross-country skiing ====
- World Cup in Kuusamo, Finland:
  - Women's Sprint Classic: (gold) Justyna Kowalczyk (POL) (silver) Petra Majdic (SLO) (bronze) Alena Prochazkova (SVK)
  - Men's Sprint Classic: (gold) Ola Vigen Hattestad (NOR) (silver) Øystein Pettersen (NOR) (bronze) Nikita Kriukov (RUS)

==== Field hockey ====
- Men's Champions Trophy in Melbourne, Australia:
  - Germany 3–2 England
  - Australia 4–0 South Korea
  - Spain 2–3 Netherlands

==== Football (soccer) ====
- OFC Champions League Group stage, Matchday 3:
  - Group A:
    - Waitakere United (New Zealand) 1–1 (New Zealand) Auckland City FC
    - AS Manu-Ura (French Polynesia) 1–1 (New Caledonia) AS Magenta
      - Standings: Auckland City 7 points, Waitakere United 5, Magenta 2, Manu-Ura 1.

==== Luge ====
- World Cup in Igls, Austria:
  - Women: (gold) Natalie Geisenberger (GER) 1:19.229 (silver) Tatjana Hüfner (GER) 1:19.282 (bronze) Anke Wischnewski (GER) 1:19.289
    - Standings after 2 of 8 races: (1) Hüfner & Geisenberger 185 points (3) Wischnewski 140
  - Doubles: (gold) Patric Leitner/Alexander Resch (GER) 1:18.631 (silver) André Florschütz/Torsten Wustlich (GER) 1:18.732 (bronze) Andreas Linger/Wolfgang Linger (AUT) 1:18.737
    - Standings after 2 of 8 races: (1) Leitner/Resch 200 points (2) Florschütz/Wustlich 170 (3) Christian Oberstolz/Patrick Gruber (ITA) & Linger/Linger 130

==== Nordic combined ====
- World Cup in Kuusamo, Finland:
  - HS142 / 10 km: (gold) Jason Lamy Chappuis (FRA) 27:05.0 (silver) Hannu Manninen (FIN) 27:13.1 (bronze) Eric Frenzel (GER) 27:15.6

==== Rugby union ====
- End of year tests:
  - Week 5:
    - Italy 24–6 Samoa in Ascoli Piceno
    - Ireland 15–10 South Africa in Dublin
    - Scotland 6–9 Argentina in Edinburgh
    - Portugal 19–24 Tonga in Lisbon
    - Wales 12–33 Australia in Cardiff
    - Romania 18–29 Fiji in Bucharest
    - France 12–39 New Zealand in Marseille
    - Canada 22–6 Russia in Burnaby
- 2011 Rugby World Cup qualifying:
  - Africa Round 3, second leg: (first leg score in parentheses)
    - **Namibia** 22–10 (18–13) Tunisia in Windhoek. Namibia win 40–23 on aggregate.
      - Namibia qualify for their fourth consecutive World Cup, while Tunisia will face the third-placed team from Europe in the semi-finals of the Play-off series.

==== Ski jumping ====
- World Cup in Kuusamo, Finland:
  - HS 142: (gold) Bjørn Einar Romøren (NOR) 299.8 points (139.5m/139.0m) (silver) Pascal Bodmer (GER) 290.7 (133.0/141.0) (bronze) Wolfgang Loitzl (AUT) 290.4 (136.5/136.5)

==== Snooker ====
- Premier League Snooker – Semi-finals in Hopton-on-Sea, Norfolk
  - **Shaun Murphy** (ENG) def. John Higgins (SCO) 5–3
  - **Ronnie O'Sullivan** (ENG) def. Judd Trump (ENG) 5–1

==== Swimming ====
- World record set (short course):
  - Women's 1500m freestyle: Lotte Friis (DEN) 15:28.65, Birkerød, Denmark

==== Tennis ====
- ATP World Tour:
  - ATP World Tour Finals in London, United Kingdom:
    - Semifinals:
      - (6) Nikolay Davydenko (RUS) def. (1) Roger Federer (SUI) 6–2, 4–6, 7–5
      - (5) Juan Martín del Potro (ARG) def. (8) Robin Söderling (SWE) 6–7(1), 6–3, 7–6(3)

==== Weightlifting ====
- World Championships in Goyang, South Korea:
  - Women 75kg:
    - Snatch: (gold) Svetlana Podobedova (KAZ) 132 kg (silver) Cao Lei (CHN) 121 kg (bronze) Hripsime Khurshudyan (ARM) 120 kg
    - Clean & Jerk: (gold) Podobedova 160 kg (silver) Cao 148 kg (bronze) Khurshudyan 147 kg
    - Total: (gold) Podobedova 292 kg (silver) Cao 269 kg (bronze) Khurshudyan 267 kg
  - Women +75kg:
    - Snatch: (gold) Tatiana Kashirina (RUS) 138 kg (silver) Jang Mi-Ran (KOR) 136 kg (bronze) Meng Suping (CHN) 131 kg
    - Clean & Jerk: (gold) Jang 187 kg (silver) Kashirina 165 kg (bronze) Meng 165 kg
    - Total: (gold) Jang 323 kg (silver) Kashirina 303 kg (bronze) Meng 296 kg

=== November 27, 2009 (Friday) ===
==== American football ====
- NCAA Division I FBS:
  - BCS Top 10 (unbeaten teams in **bold**):
    - Iron Bowl: (2) **Alabama** 26, Auburn 21
      - The Crimson Tide complete a 12–0 regular season.
    - (5) **Cincinnati** 49, Illinois 36
    - (6) **Boise State** 44, Nevada 33
      - The Broncos clinch the WAC championship title.
    - The Backyard Brawl: West Virginia 19, (9) Pittsburgh 16

==== Basketball ====
- NCAA:
  - NIT Season Tip-Off Final in New York City:
    - Duke 68, UConn 59

==== Cricket ====
- Sri Lanka in India:
  - 2nd Test in Kanpur, day 4:
    - India 642; Sri Lanka 229 & 269. **India win by an innings and 144 runs & lead the 3-match series 1–0**.
- Pakistan in New Zealand:
  - 1st Test in Dunedin, day 4:
    - New Zealand 429 & 147/8; Pakistan 332. New Zealand lead by 244 runs with 2 wickets remaining.
- West Indies in Australia:
  - 1st Test in Woolloongabba, Brisbane, day 2:
    - Australia 480/8d; West Indies 134/5 (39 ov). West Indies trail by 346 runs with 5 wickets remaining in the 1st innings.
- England in South Africa:
  - 3rd ODI in Cape Town:
    - South Africa 354/6 (50 overs, AB de Villiers 121); England 242 (41.3 overs). **South Africa win by 112 runs & the 5-match series level 1–1**.

==== Rugby union ====
- End of year tests:
  - Week 5:
    - Ireland A 31–0 Argentina XV in Dublin

==== Ski jumping ====
- World Cup in Kuusamo, Finland:
  - HS 142 Team: (gold) Austria (Wolfgang Loitzl, Andreas Kofler, Gregor Schlierenzauer, Thomas Morgenstern) 1113.6 (silver) Germany (Michael Uhrmann, Michael Neumayer, Pascal Bodmer, Martin Schmitt) 1099.2 (bronze) Finland (Matti Hautamäki, Kalle Keituri, Harri Olli, Janne Ahonen) 1058.0

==== Tennis ====
- ATP World Tour:
  - ATP World Tour Finals in London, United Kingdom: (players in **bold** advance to the semifinals)
    - Group B:
      - Novak Djokovic (SRB) [3] def. Rafael Nadal (ESP) [2] 7–6(5), 6–3
      - **Nikolay Davydenko** (RUS) [6] def. **Robin Söderling** (SWE) [8] 7–6(4), 4–6, 6–3
        - Standings: Söderling, Davydenko, Djokovic 2–1, Nadal 0–3.

==== Weightlifting ====
- World Championships in Goyang, South Korea:
  - Women 69kg:
    - Snatch: (gold) Nazik Avdalyan (ARM) 119 kg (silver) Oxana Slivenko (RUS) 118 kg (bronze) Zhang Shaoling (MAC) 112 kg
    - Clean & Jerk: (gold) Avdalyan 147 kg (silver) Slivenko 146 kg (bronze) Zhang 136 kg
    - Total: (gold) Avdalyan 266 kg (silver) Slivenko 264 kg (bronze) Zhang 248 kg
  - Men 94kg:
    - Snatch: (gold) Vladimir Sedov (KAZ) 185 kg (silver) Artem Ivanov (UKR) 180 kg (bronze) Kim Min-Jae (KOR) 178 kg
    - Clean & Jerk: (gold) Kim Seon-Jong (KOR) 218 kg (silver) Sedov 217 kg (bronze) Valeriu Calancea (ROM) 211 kg
    - Total: (gold) Sedov 402 kg (silver) Nizami Pashayev (AZE) 387 kg (bronze) Kim Min-Jae 384 kg

=== November 26, 2009 (Thursday) ===
==== American football ====
- NFL Week 12: Thanksgiving Day games
  - Green Bay Packers 34, Detroit Lions 12
  - Dallas Cowboys 24, Oakland Raiders 7
  - Denver Broncos 26, New York Giants 6
- NCAA BCS Top 10 (unbeaten team in **bold**):
  - Lone Star Showdown: (3) **Texas** 49, Texas A&M 39
    - The Longhorns complete a 12–0 regular season.

==== Basketball ====
- Euroleague:
  - Regular Season Game 5: (unbeaten teams in **bold**)
    - Group A:
      - Montepaschi Siena (Italy) 65–84 (Spain) **Regal FC Barcelona**
        - Standings: Barcelona 5–0, Siena 4–1, Fenerbahçe Ülker 3–2, Cibona, Žalgiris, Villeurbanne 1–4.
    - Group B:
      - Efes Pilsen Istanbul (Turkey) 77–64 (France) Entente Orléans Loiret
      - **Unicaja Málaga** (Spain) 91–84 (Lithuania) Lietuvos Rytas Vilnius
      - Partizan Belgrade (Serbia) 86–80 (Greece) Olympiacos Piraeus
        - Standings: Unicaja 5–0, Olympiacos, Lietuvos Rytas 3–2, Efes Pilsen, Partizan 2–3, Orléans 0–5.
    - Group C:
      - Maccabi Tel Aviv (Israel) 75–67 (Greece) Maroussi Athens
      - Caja Laboral Baskonia (Spain) 67–71 (Russia) CSKA Moscow
        - Standings: Maccabi 4–1, Roma, CSKA Moscow, Caja Laboral 3–2, Maroussi, Olimpija 1–4.
    - Group D:
      - Real Madrid (Spain) 82–69 (Italy) Armani Jeans Milano
        - Standings: Panathinaikos, Real Madrid, Khimki 4–1, Milano, Asseco Prokom, EWE Baskets 1–4.

==== Cricket ====
- Sri Lanka in India:
  - 2nd Test in Kanpur, day 3:
    - India 642; Sri Lanka 229 & 57/4 (f/o, 23.0 ov). Sri Lanka trail by 356 runs with 6 wickets remaining.
- Pakistan in New Zealand:
  - 1st Test in Dunedin, day 3:
    - New Zealand 429; Pakistan 307/8 (90.0 ov, Umar Akmal 129). Pakistan trail by 122 runs with 2 wickets remaining in the 1st innings.
- West Indies in Australia:
  - 1st Test in Woolloongabba, Brisbane, day 1:
    - Australia 322/5 (90.0 ov)

==== Football (soccer) ====
- 2011 FIFA Women's World Cup qualification (UEFA):
  - Group 3: Greece 5–0 Georgia
    - Standings: Denmark 7 points (3 matches), Scotland 6 (2), Greece 6 (4), Bulgaria 4 (3).
  - Group 5: Turkey 0–3 England
    - Standings: Spain 12 points (4 matches), England 6 (2), Austria 3 (3).
  - Group 8: Czech Republic 1–2 Belgium
    - Standings: Sweden 9 points (3 matches), Belgium 7 (5), Azerbaijan 4 (3), Wales 3 (4), Czech Republic 3 (3).

==== Tennis ====
- ATP World Tour:
  - ATP World Tour Finals in London, United Kingdom: (players in **bold** advance to the semifinals)
    - Group A:
      - Andy Murray (GBR) [4] def. Fernando Verdasco (ESP) [7] 6–4, 6–7(4), 7–6(3)
      - **Juan Martín del Potro** (ARG) [5] def. **Roger Federer** (SUI) [1] 6–4, 6–7(5), 6–3
        - Standings: Federer, del Potro, Murray 2–1, Verdasco 0–3.
        - del Potro advances to the semis thanks to one game advantage over Murray.

==== Weightlifting ====
- World Championships in Goyang, South Korea:
  - Men 85kg:
    - Snatch: (gold) Lu Yong (CHN) 175 kg (silver) Tigran Vardan Martirosyan (ARM) 172 kg (bronze) Siarhei Lahun (BLR) 171 kg
    - Clean & Jerk: (gold) Lahun 209 kg (silver) Lu 208 kg (bronze) Gevorik Poghosyan (ARM) 208 kg
    - Total: (gold) Lu 383 kg (silver) Lahun 380 kg (bronze) Vladimir Kuznetsov (KAZ) 376 kg

=== November 25, 2009 (Wednesday) ===
==== Basketball ====
- Euroleague:
  - Regular Season Game 5:
    - Group A:
      - Žalgiris Kaunas (Lithuania) 78–84 (Turkey) Fenerbahçe Ülker İstanbul
      - ASVEL Villeurbanne (France) 71–68 (Croatia) Cibona Zagreb
        - Standings: Siena, Barcelona 4–0, Fenerbahçe Ülker 3–2, Cibona, Žalgiris, Villeurbanne 1–4.
    - Group C:
      - Union Olimpija Ljubljana (Slovenia) 87–70 (Italy) Lottomatica Roma
        - Standings: Caja Laboral, Maccabi 3–1, Roma 3–2, CSKA Moscow 2–2, Maroussi 1–3, Olimpija 1–4.
    - Group D:
      - Khimki Moscow Region (Russia) 89–67 (Poland) Asseco Prokom Gdynia
      - Panathinaikos Athens (Greece) 96–63 (Germany) EWE Baskets Oldenburg
        - Standings: Panathinaikos, Khimki 4–1, Real Madrid 3–1, Milano 1–3, EWE Baskets, Asseco Prokom 1–4.

==== Cricket ====
- Sri Lanka in India:
  - 2nd Test in Kanpur, day 2:
    - India 642 (Rahul Dravid 144); Sri Lanka 66/1 (24.0 ov). Sri Lanka trail by 576 runs with 9 wickets remaining in the 1st innings.
- Pakistan in New Zealand:
  - 1st Test in Dunedin, day 2:
    - New Zealand 404/8 (126.0 ov)
      - Only 36 overs were played due to rain and bad light. Daniel Vettori just misses a century when he is dismissed at 99, but still manages to surpass Shane Warne and become the highest no. 8 Test run-getter.

==== Football (soccer) ====
- 2011 FIFA Women's World Cup qualification (UEFA):
  - Group 7: Italy 7–0 Armenia
    - Standings: Italy, Finland 12 points (4 matches), Portugal 3 (3), Slovenia 3 (4).
- UEFA Champions League group stage, Matchday 5: (teams in **bold** advance to the round of 16, teams in italics advance to the round of 32 in Europa League, teams in ~~strike~~ are eliminated)
  - Group A:
    - Bayern Munich (Germany) 1–0 (Israel) ~~Maccabi Haifa~~
    - **Bordeaux** (France) 2–0 (Italy) Juventus
      - Standings: Bordeaux 13 points, Juventus 8, Bayern Munich 7, Maccabi Haifa 0.
  - Group B:
    - CSKA Moscow (Russia) 2–1 (Germany) Wolfsburg
    - **Manchester United** (England) 0–1 (Turkey) Beşiktaş
      - Standings: Manchester United 10 points, Wolfsburg, CSKA Moscow 7, Beşiktaş 4.
  - Group C:
    - Milan (Italy) 1–1 (France) Marseille
    - Real Madrid (Spain) 1–0 (Switzerland) ~~Zürich~~
      - Standings: Real Madrid 10 points, Milan 8, Marseille 7, Zürich 3.
  - Group D:
    - APOEL (Cyprus) 1–1 (Spain) Atlético Madrid
    - **Porto (Portugal)** 0–1 **(England) Chelsea**
      - Standings: Chelsea 13 points, Porto 9, Atlético Madrid 3, APOEL 2.
- Copa Sudamericana Finals, first leg:
  - LDU Quito (Ecuador) 5–1 (Brazil) Fluminense

==== Tennis ====
- ATP World Tour:
  - ATP World Tour Finals in London, United Kingdom: (players in **bold** advance to the semifinals)
    - Group B:
      - **Robin Söderling** (SWE) [8] def. Novak Djokovic (SRB) [3] 7–6(5), 6–1
      - Nikolay Davydenko (RUS) [6] def. Rafael Nadal (ESP) [2] 6–1, 7–6(4)
        - Standings: Söderling 2–0, Davydenko, Djokovic 1–1, Nadal 0–2.

==== Weightlifting ====
- World Championships in Goyang, South Korea:
  - Women 63kg:
    - Snatch: (gold) Viktoriya Savenko (RUS) 112 kg (silver) Hanna Batsiushka (BLR) 112 kg (bronze) Svetlana Tsarukaeva (RUS) 111 kg
    - Clean & Jerk: (gold) Maya Maneza (KAZ) 141 kg (silver) Sibel Şimşek (TUR) 135 kg (bronze) Guo Xiyan (CHN) 135 kg
    - Total: (gold) Maneza 246 kg (silver) Tsarukaeva 246 kg (bronze) Şimşek 243 kg

=== November 24, 2009 (Tuesday) ===
==== Baseball ====
- 2009 Major League Baseball awards:
  - National League MVP — Albert Pujols, St. Louis Cardinals, 1B
    - Pujols wins the award for the second straight year and third time overall.

==== Cricket ====
- Sri Lanka in India:
  - 2nd Test in Kanpur, day 1:
    - India 417/2 (90.0 Ov, Gautam Gambhir 167, Virender Sehwag 131)
- Pakistan in New Zealand:
  - 1st Test in Dunedin, day 1:
    - New Zealand 276/6 (90.0 ov)

==== Football (soccer) ====
- UEFA Champions League group stage, Matchday 5: (teams in **bold** advance to the round of 16, teams in italics advance to the round of 32 in Europa League, teams in ~~strike~~ are eliminated)
  - Group E:
    - ~~Debrecen~~ (Hungary) 0–1 (England) Liverpool
    - **Fiorentina** (Italy) 1–0 (France) **Lyon**
      - Standings: Fiorentina 12 points, Lyon 10, Liverpool 7, Debrecen 0.
  - Group F:
    - Barcelona (Spain) 2–0 (Italy) Internazionale
    - Rubin Kazan (Russia) 0–0 (Ukraine) Dynamo Kyiv
      - Standings: Barcelona 8 points, Inter, Rubin Kazan 6, Dynamo Kyiv 5.
  - Group G:
    - ~~Rangers~~ (Scotland) 0–2 (Germany) Stuttgart
    - Unirea Urziceni (Romania) 1–0 (Spain) **Sevilla**
      - Standings: Sevilla 10 points, Unirea Urziceni 8, Stuttgart 6, Rangers 2.
  - Group H:
    - AZ (Netherlands) 0–0 (Greece) Olympiacos
    - **Arsenal** (England) 2–0 (Belgium) Standard Liège
      - Standings: Arsenal 13 points, Olympiacos 7, Standard Liège 4, AZ 3.

==== Rugby union ====
- End of year tests:
  - Week 5:
    - Cardiff Blues (Wales) 3–31 Australia in Cardiff

==== Tennis ====
- ATP World Tour:
  - ATP World Tour Finals in London, United Kingdom:
    - Group A:
      - Juan Martín del Potro (ARG) [5] def. Fernando Verdasco (ESP) [7] 6–4, 3–6, 7–6(1)
      - Roger Federer (SUI) [1] def. Andy Murray (GBR) [4] 3–6, 6–3, 6–1
        - Federer's win secures him the year-end #1 ranking for the fifth time.
        - Standings: Federer 2–0, Murray, del Potro 1–1, Verdasco 0–2.

==== Weightlifting ====
- World Championships in Goyang, South Korea:
  - Men 77kg:
    - Snatch: (gold) Lü Xiaojun (CHN) 174 kg (silver) Tigran Gevorg Martirosyan (ARM) 170 kg (bronze) Su Dajin (CHN) 165 kg
    - Clean & Jerk: (gold) Sa Jae-Hyouk (KOR) 205 kg (silver) Lu 204 kg (bronze) Su 200 kg
    - Total: (gold) Lu 378 kg (silver) Martirosyan 370 kg (bronze) Su 365 kg

=== November 23, 2009 (Monday) ===
==== American football ====
- NFL Monday Night Football, Week 11
  - Tennessee Titans 20, Houston Texans 17

==== Baseball ====
- 2009 Major League Baseball awards:
  - American League MVP — Joe Mauer, catcher, Minnesota Twins

==== Golf ====
- LPGA Tour:
  - LPGA Tour Championship in Richmond, Texas:
    - Winner: Anna Nordqvist (SWE) 203 (−13)
      - The tournament was shortened to 54 holes.

==== Tennis ====
- ATP World Tour:
  - ATP World Tour Finals in London, United Kingdom:
    - Group B:
      - Robin Söderling (SWE) [8] def. Rafael Nadal (ESP) [2] 6–4, 6–4
      - Novak Djokovic (SRB) [3] def. Nikolay Davydenko (RUS) [6] 3–6, 6–4, 7–5

==== Volleyball ====
- Men's World Grand Champions Cup in Japan:
  - Round 5 in Nagoya:
    - Cuba 3–1 Iran
    - Poland 3–0 Egypt
    - Brazil 3–0 Japan
      - Final standings: (gold) Brazil 10 points, (silver) Cuba 9, (bronze) Japan 8, Poland 7, Iran 6, Egypt 5.
        - Brazil win the title for the third time.

==== Weightlifting ====
- World Championships in Goyang, South Korea:
  - Women 58kg:
    - Snatch: (gold) Li Xueying (CHN) 107 kg (silver) Nastassia Novikava (BLR) 100 kg (bronze) Yuliya Kalina (UKR) 96 kg
    - Clean & Jerk: (gold) Li 132 kg (silver) Novikava 125 kg (bronze) Kalina 119 kg
    - Total: (gold) Li 239 kg (silver) Novikava 225 kg (bronze) Kalina 215 kg

=== November 22, 2009 (Sunday) ===
==== American football ====
- NFL Week 11 (unbeaten teams in **bold**):
  - Dallas Cowboys 7, Washington Redskins 6
  - Green Bay Packers 30, San Francisco 49ers 24
  - Kansas City Chiefs 27, Pittsburgh Steelers 24 (OT)
  - Minnesota Vikings 35, Seattle Seahawks 9
  - New York Giants 34, Atlanta Falcons 31 (OT)
  - **New Orleans Saints** 38, Tampa Bay Buccaneers 7
  - Jacksonville Jaguars 18, Buffalo Bills 15
  - **Indianapolis Colts** 17, Baltimore Ravens 15
  - Detroit Lions 38, Cleveland Browns 37
    - Matthew Stafford's 1-yard touchdown pass to Brandon Pettigrew on an untimed down with no time remaining ties the game, and Jason Hanson's extra point wins it.
  - Arizona Cardinals 21, St. Louis Rams 13
  - San Diego Chargers 32, Denver Broncos 3
  - Oakland Raiders 20, Cincinnati Bengals 17
  - New England Patriots 31, New York Jets 14
  - Sunday Night Football: Philadelphia Eagles 24, Chicago Bears 20

==== Auto racing ====
- Chase for the Sprint Cup:
  - Ford 400 in Homestead, Florida:
    - (1) Denny Hamlin (Virginia) (Toyota, Joe Gibbs Racing) (2) Jeff Burton (Virginia) (Chevrolet, Richard Childress Racing) (3) Kevin Harvick (California) (Chevrolet, Richard Childress Racing)
    - Final drivers' standings: (1) Jimmie Johnson (California) (Chevrolet, Hendrick Motorsports) 6652 points (2) Mark Martin (Arkansas) (Chevrolet, Hendrick Motorsports) 6511 (3) Jeff Gordon (California) (Chevrolet, Hendrick Motorsports) 6473
      - Johnson becomes the first driver ever to win four consecutive Cup Series titles.
- V8 Supercars:
  - BigPond 300 in Perth, Western Australia:
    - Race 24: (1) Craig Lowndes (AUS) (Ford Falcon) (2) Steven Johnson (AUS) (Ford Falcon) (3) Garth Tander (AUS) (Holden Commodore)
      - Drivers' standings (after 24 of 26 races): (1) Whincup 3175 points (2) Will Davison (AUS) (Holden Commodore) 2894 (3) Tander 2766

==== Badminton ====
- BWF Super Series:
  - China Open Super Series in Shanghai:
    - Mixed doubles: Lee Yong-dae/Lee Hyo-jung (KOR) [1] def. Zheng Bo/Ma Jin (CHN) [2] 21–18 15–21 21–15
    - Men's singles: Lin Dan (CHN) [2] def. Jan Ø. Jørgensen (DEN) 21–12 21–12
    - Women's doubles: Tian Qing/Zhang Yawen (CHN) [6] def. Du Jing/Yu Yang (CHN) [2] 21–14 21–14
    - Women's singles: Jiang Yanjiao (CHN) [6] def. Wang Xin (CHN) 21–19 22–20
    - Men's doubles: Jung Jae-sung/Lee Yong-dae (KOR) [2] def. Koo Kien Keat/Tan Boon Heong (MAS) [1] 21–13 19–21 21–18

==== Bobsleigh ====
- World Cup in Lake Placid, United States:
  - Four-man: (gold) Steven Holcomb/Justin Olsen/Steve Mesler/Curtis Tomasevicz (USA) 1:49.60 (silver) John Napier/Jamie Moriarty/Steven Langton/Christopher Fogt (USA) 1:50.04 (bronze) Wolfgang Stampfer/Johannes Wipplinger/Juergen Mayer/Martin Lachkovics (AUT) 1:50.14
    - Standings (after 2 of 8 races): (1) Jānis Miņins (LAT) 394 points (2) Lyndon Rush (CAN) 393 (3) Holcomb 393
  - Team: (gold) Frank Rommel, Sandra Kiriasis/Berit Wiacker, Marion Trott, Thomas Florschütz/Marc Kühne (GER) 3:46.92 (silver) Eric Bernotas, Erin Pac/Jamie Greubel, Noelle Pikus-Pace, John Napier/T.J. Burns (USA) 3:47.97 (bronze) Jon Montgomery, Kaillie Humphries/Amanda Morely, Mellisa Hollingsworth, Lyndon Rush/Neville Wright (CAN) 3:48.18

==== Canadian football ====
- Grey Cup Playoffs:
  - Division finals:
    - Montreal Alouettes 56, BC Lions 18
    - Saskatchewan Roughriders 27, Calgary Stampeders 17

==== Cricket ====
- England in South Africa:
  - 2nd ODI in Centurion:
    - South Africa 250/9 (50 overs); England 252/3 (46 overs, Paul Collingwood 105*). **England win by 7 wickets and lead the 5-match series 1–0**.

==== Cross-country skiing ====
- World Cup in Beitostolen, Norway:
  - Women's 4 x 5 km Relay: (gold) Anna Olsson/Sara Lindborg/Anna Haag/Charlotte Kalla (SWE) 58:37.1 (silver) Vibeke Skofterud/Therese Johaug/Kristin Størmer Steira/Marit Bjørgen (NOR) 58:53.8 (bronze) Pirjo Muranen/Virpi Kuitunen/Riitta-Liisa Roponen/Aino-Kaisa Saarinen (FIN) 58:59.1
  - Men's 4 x 10 km Relay: (gold) Eldar Rønning/Martin Johnsrud Sundby/Ronny Hafsås/Petter Northug 1:48:50.7 (NOR) (silver) Maxim Vylegzhanin/Nikolay Pankratov/Alexander Legkov/Ilia Chernousov (RUS) 1:48:55.8 (bronze) Jens Filbrich/Axel Teichmann/René Sommerfeldt/Tobias Angerer (GER) 1:49:02.5

==== Figure skating ====
- ISU Grand Prix:
  - Skate Canada International in Kitchener, Ontario, Canada: (skaters in **bold** qualify for the Grand Prix Final)
    - Ice Dance: (gold) **Tessa Virtue/Scott Moir** (CAN) 204.38 (silver) **Nathalie Péchalat/Fabian Bourzat** (FRA) 185.07 (bronze) Kaitlyn Weaver/Andrew Poje (CAN) 165.64
      - Final standings: **Meryl Davis/Charlie White** (USA), Virtue/Moir, **Tanith Belbin/Benjamin Agosto** (USA) 30 points, Pechalat/Bourzat, **Anna Cappellini/Luca Lanotte** (ITA) 26, **Sinead Kerr/John Kerr** (GBR) 24.

==== Football (soccer) ====
- Beach Soccer World Cup in Dubai, United Arab Emirates:
  - Bronze medal match: (bronze) **Portugal** 14–7 Uruguay
  - Final: (gold) **Brazil** 10–5 (silver) Switzerland
    - Brazil win the title for the fourth successive time and 13th time overall.
- 2011 FIFA Women's World Cup qualification (UEFA):
  - Group 8: Azerbaijan 0–0 Belgium
    - Standings: Sweden 9 points (3 matches), Azerbaijan 4 (3), Belgium 4 (4), Wales 3 (4), Czech Republic 3 (2).
- 2011 Asian Cup qualification: (teams in **bold** qualify for 2011 AFC Asian Cup)
  - Group D: China 1–0 Lebanon
    - Standings (after 4 matches): **Syria** 10 points, China 9, Vietnam 4, Lebanon 0.
  - Group E: Jordan 1–0 Iran
    - Standings (after 4 matches): Iran 7 points, Singapore 6, Thailand 5, Jordan 4.
- (United States) MLS Cup in Seattle:
  - Los Angeles Galaxy 1, **Real Salt Lake** 1. Real Salt Lake win 5–4 in penalty shootout.
    - Real Salt Lake win the title for the first time.
- (Republic of Ireland) FAI Cup Final in Dublin:
  - Sligo Rovers 1–2 **Sporting Fingal**
    - Sporting Fingal win their first trophy in only their second season, and qualify for the Europa League.
- (Scotland) Scottish Challenge Cup Final in Perth:
  - **Dundee** 3–2 Inverness Caledonian Thistle
    - Dundee win the Cup for the second time.

==== Golf ====
- European Tour:
  - Dubai World Championship in United Arab Emirates:
    - Winner: Lee Westwood (ENG) 265 (−23)
      - Westwood's win also places him atop the season-ending money list, giving him a US$1.5 million Race to Dubai bonus.
- LPGA Tour:
  - LPGA Tour Championship in Richmond, Texas:
    - Bad weather caused the suspension of play on Friday and Saturday, and the event was shortened to 54 holes. The second round resumes today, but is suspended due to darkness with about a quarter of the field still on the course. On Monday, the second round is due to be completed, a cut made, and the final round played.

==== Skeleton ====
- World Cup in Lake Placid, United States:
  - Team: (gold) Frank Rommel, Sandra Kiriasis/Berit Wiacker, Marion Trott, Thomas Florschütz/Marc Kühne (GER) 3:46.92 (silver) Eric Bernotas, Erin Pac/Jamie Greubel, Noelle Pikus-Pace, John Napier/T.J. Burns (USA) 3:47.97 (bronze) Jon Montgomery, Kaillie Humphries/Amanda Morely, Mellisa Hollingsworth, Lyndon Rush/Neville Wright (CAN) 3:48.18

==== Speed skating ====
- World Cup 3 in Hamar, Norway:
  - 1500 m women: (gold) Kristina Groves (CAN) 1:55.16 (silver) Ireen Wüst (NED) 1:55.95 (bronze) Martina Sáblíková (CZE) 1:56.34
    - Standings (after 3 of 6 races): (1) Groves 230 points (2) Wüst 204 (3) Christine Nesbitt (CAN) 180
  - 10000 m men: (gold) Sven Kramer (NED) 12:50.96 (silver) Bob de Jong (NED) 12:54.97 (bronze) Ivan Skobrev (RUS) 13:01.41
    - Standings (after 3 of 6 races): (1) Kramer 300 (2) de Jong 230 (3) Håvard Bøkko (NOR) 210

==== Swimming ====
- 2009 FINA Swimming World Cup – Series 5 in Singapore:
  - World records set:
    - Men's 50m backstroke: Peter Marshall (USA) 22.61
    - Women's 50m butterfly: Therese Alshammar (SWE) 24.38
    - Women's 400m individual medley: Katheryn Meaklim (RSA) 4:22.88
  - World Cup records set:
    - Women's 100m freestyle: Francesca Halsall (GBR) 51.19

==== Tennis ====
- ATP World Tour:
  - ATP World Tour Finals in London, United Kingdom:
    - Group A:
      - (4) Andy Murray (GBR) def. (5) Juan Martín del Potro (ARG) 6–3, 3–6, 6–2
      - (1) Roger Federer (SUI) def. (7) Fernando Verdasco (ESP) 4–6, 7–5, 6–1

==== Volleyball ====
- Men's World Grand Champions Cup in Japan:
  - Round 4 in Nagoya:
    - Egypt 0–3 Brazil
    - Iran 1–3 Poland
    - Japan 0–3 Cuba
      - Standings: Brazil 8 points, Cuba, Japan 7, Iran, Poland 5, Egypt 4.

==== Weightlifting ====
- World Championships in Goyang, South Korea:
  - Women 53kg:
    - Snatch: (gold) Chen Xiaoting (CHN) 95 kg (silver) Yoon Jin-Hee (KOR) 93 kg (bronze) Svetlana Cheremshanova (KAZ) 92 kg
    - Clean & Jerk: (gold) Zulfiya Chinshanlo (KAZ) 129 kg (silver) Chen 123 kg (bronze) Yoon 116 kg
    - Total: (gold) Chinshanlo 219 kg (silver) Chen 218 kg (bronze) Yoon 209 kg
  - Men 69kg:
    - Snatch: (gold) Liao Hui (CHN) 160 kg (silver) Ninel Miculescu (ROM) 155 kg (bronze) Arakel Mirzoyan (ARM) 154 kg
    - Clean & Jerk: (gold) Liao 186 kg (silver) Kim Sun-Bae (KOR) 181 kg (bronze) Triyatno (INA) 180 kg
    - Total: (gold) Liao 346 kg (silver) Mirzoyan 334 kg (bronze) Triyatno 330 kg

=== November 21, 2009 (Saturday) ===
==== American football ====
- NCAA:
  - BCS Top 10 (unbeaten teams in **bold**):
    - (1) **Florida** 62, Florida International 3
    - (2) **Alabama** 45, Chattanooga 0
    - (3) **Texas** 51, Kansas 20
      - Longhorns quarterback Colt McCoy sets a new Division I FBS record for career wins by a starting quarterback with 43.
    - (4) **TCU** 45, Wyoming 10
    - Mississippi 25, (8) LSU 23
    - Michigan–Ohio State rivalry: (10) Ohio State 21, Michigan 10
    - Played earlier this week: (6) **Boise State**
    - Idle: (5) **Cincinnati**, (7) Georgia Tech, (9) Pittsburgh
  - Other games:
    - Northwestern 33, (16) Wisconsin 31
    - The Big Game: (25) California 34, (17) Stanford 28

==== Auto racing ====
- Nationwide Series:
  - Ford 300 in Homestead, Florida:
    - (1) Kyle Busch (Nevada) (Toyota, Joe Gibbs Racing) (2) Carl Edwards (Missouri) (Ford, Roush Fenway Racing) (3) Jeff Burton (Virginia) (Chevrolet, Richard Childress Racing)
    - Final driver standings: (1) Busch 5682 points (2) Edwards 5472 (3) Brad Keselowski (Michigan) (Chevrolet, JR Motorsports) 5364
- V8 Supercars:
  - BigPond 300 in Perth, Western Australia:
    - Race 23: (1) Jamie Whincup (AUS) (Ford Falcon) (2) Todd Kelly (AUS) (Holden Commodore) (3) Mark Winterbottom (AUS) (Ford Falcon)
      - Drivers' standings (after 23 of 26 races): (1) Whincup 3054 points (2) Will Davison (AUS) (Holden Commodore) 2893 (3) Garth Tander (AUS) (Holden Commodore) 2636

==== Bobsleigh ====
- World Cup in Lake Placid, United States:
  - Two-man: (gold) John Napier/Charles Berkeley (USA) 1:53.62 (silver) Steven Holcomb/Justin Olsen (USA) 1:53.88 (bronze) Ivo Rüegg/Roman Handschin (SUI) 1:53.91
    - Standings (after 2 of 8 races): (1) Holcomb 402 points (2) Rüegg 400 (3) Alexandr Zubkov (RUS) 360
  - Women: (gold) Cathleen Martini/Romy Logsch (GER) 1:56.15 (silver) Sandra Kiriasis/Janine Tischer (GER) 1:56.56 (bronze) Kaillie Humphries/Heather Moyse (CAN) 1:57.23
    - Standings (after 2 of 8 races): (1) Martini 450 points (2) Kiriasis 420 (3) Humphries 376

==== Canadian football ====
- CIS football championships:
  - Mitchell Bowl national semi-final game:
    - (4) Queen's Golden Gaels 33, (1) Laval Rouge et Or 30
      - The Gaels deny the Rouge et Or the chance to defend the Vanier Cup in front of a home crowd. Laval quarterback Benoit Groulx was uncharacteristically sacked 7 times in the game.
  - Uteck Bowl national semi-final game:
    - (2) Calgary Dinos 38, (6) Saint Mary's Huskies 14
      - Dinos coach Blake Nill and quarterback Erik Glavic make their return to Halifax, where Nill was the Huskies head coach and Glavic was their quarterback. The Dinos improve to 3–1 all time against the Huskies.

==== Cross-country skiing ====
- World Cup in Beitostolen, Norway:
  - Women's 10 km Freestyle: (gold) Marit Bjørgen (NOR) 24:48.3 (silver) Charlotte Kalla 25:18.0 (SWE) (bronze) Anna Haag (SWE) 25:25.5
  - Men's 15 km Freestyle: (gold) Ronny Hafsås (NOR) 34:42.1 (silver) Vincent Vittoz 34:42.3 (FRA) (bronze) Matti Heikkinen (FIN) 34:48.7

==== Figure skating ====
- ISU Grand Prix:
  - Skate Canada International in Kitchener, Ontario, Canada: (skaters in **bold** qualify for the Grand Prix Final)
    - Ice Dance – standings after Original Dance: (1) Tessa Virtue/Scott Moir (CAN) 101.26 (2) Nathalie Péchalat/Fabian Bourzat (FRA) 91.60 (3) Kaitlyn Weaver/Andrew Poje (CAN) 83.36
    - Pairs: (gold) **Aliona Savchenko/Robin Szolkowy** (GER) 206.71 (WR) (silver) **Maria Mukhortova/Maxim Trankov** (RUS) 185.71 (bronze) Jessica Dubé/Bryce Davison (CAN) 166.93
      - Savchenko and Szolkowy improve the former record of Shen/Zhao by 0.17 points.
      - Final standings: **Shen Xue/Zhao Hongbo** (CHN), **Pang Qing/Tong Jian** (CHN) 30 points, Mukhortova/Trankov 28, Savchenko/Szolkowy, **Yuko Kavaguti/Alexander Smirnov** (RUS) 26, **Zhang Dan/Zhang Hao** (CHN), Dubé/Davison, Tatiana Volosozhar/Stanislav Morozov (UKR) 24.
    - Men: (gold) **Jeremy Abbot** (USA) 232.99 (silver) **Daisuke Takahashi** (JPN) 231.31 (bronze) Alban Preaubert (FRA) 212.28
      - Final standings: **Nobunari Oda** (JPN) 30 points, **Evan Lysacek** (USA), **Brian Joubert** (FRA) 24, Abbot, Takahashi, **Johnny Weir** (USA) 22.
    - Ladies: (gold) **Joannie Rochette** (CAN) 182.90 (silver) Alissa Czisny (USA) 163.53 (bronze) Laura Lepistö (FIN) 158.52
      - Final standings: **Kim Yuna** (KOR), **Miki Ando** (JPN) 30 points, Rochette 26, **Alena Leonova** (RUS), **Ashley Wagner** (USA) 24, **Akiko Suzuki** (JPN), Rachael Flatt (USA), Czisny 22.

==== Football (soccer) ====
- Beach Soccer World Cup in Dubai, United Arab Emirates:
  - Semifinals:
    - Portugal 2–8 **Brazil**
    - **Switzerland** 7–4 Uruguay
- 2011 FIFA Women's World Cup qualification (UEFA):
  - Group 1: Serbia 0–2 France
    - Standings: France 12 points (4 matches), Iceland 9 (4), Northern Ireland 3 (2), Croatia, Serbia 1 (3).
  - Group 2: Netherlands 1–1 Belarus
    - Standings: Norway 6 points (2 matches), Belarus 4 (2), Netherlands 4 (3), Slovakia 3 (2).
  - Group 3: Bulgaria 5–0 Georgia
    - Standings: Denmark 7 points (3 matches), Scotland 6 (2), Bulgaria 4 (3), Greece 3 (3).
  - Group 5: Turkey 0–5 Spain
    - Standings: Spain 12 points (4 matches), England 3 (1), Austria 3 (3).
  - Group 7:
    - Slovenia 0–4 Portugal
    - Finland 7–0 Armenia
      - Standings: Finland 12 points (4 matches), Italy 9 (3), Portugal 3 (3), Slovenia 3 (4).
- (Russia) Russian Premier League, matchday 29 of 30: (teams in **bold** qualify for the Champions League)
  - (1) **Rubin Kazan** 0–0 (3) Zenit St. Petersburg
  - (2) **Spartak Moscow** 2–3 (6) CSKA Moscow
  - (4) FC Moscow 0–2 (13) Spartak Nalchik
  - (8) Dynamo Moscow 0–2 (5) Lokomotiv Moscow
    - Standings: Rubin Kazan 60 points, Spartak Moscow 55, Zenit, Lokomotiv Moscow 51, CSKA Moscow 49, FC Moscow 48.
    - Rubin Kazan win the championship for the second straight season.

==== Luge ====
- World Cup in Calgary, Canada:
  - Women: (gold) Tatjana Hüfner (GER) 1:33.691 (silver) Natalie Geisenberger (GER) 1:33.858 (bronze) Anke Wischnewski (GER) 1:34.024
  - Men: (gold) Armin Zöggeler (ITA) 1:30.068 (silver) David Möller (GER) 1:30.124 (bronze) Albert Demtschenko (RUS) 1:30.166

==== Rugby union ====
- End of year tests:
  - Week 4:
    - Japan 27–6 Canada in Tokyo
    - Italy 10–32 South Africa in Udine
    - England 6–19 New Zealand in London
      - Dan Carter becomes the all-time leading Test point scorer for the All Blacks, surpassing Andrew Mehrtens.
    - Wales 33–16 Argentina in Cardiff
    - France 43–5 Samoa in Saint-Denis
    - Ireland 41–6 Fiji in Dublin
    - Scotland 9–8 Australia in Edinburgh
      - Scotland survive a last-second try by the Wallabies' Ryan Cross, as Matt Giteau misses the would-be winning conversion, and pick up their first win over the Wallabies since 1982.
    - Portugal 13–24 Argentina XV in Lisbon
- 2011 Rugby World Cup qualifying:
  - Americas Round 4, second leg (first leg score in parentheses):
    - **United States** 27–6 (27–22) Uruguay in Lauderhill, Florida. USA win 54–28 on aggregate.
      - United States qualify for Pool C of the Rugby World Cup, while Uruguay advance to the Final Place Playoff to face the second place Asian team in the semifinal.

==== Snowboarding ====
- World Cup in Stockholm, Sweden:
  - Men's Big Air: (gold) Stefan Gimpl (AUT) (silver) Marko Grilc (SLO) (bronze) Gjermund Braaten (NOR)
    - Standings after 3 of 12 events: (1) Gimpl 3000.0 points (2) GianLuca Cavigelli (SUI) 2100.0 (3) Braaten 1460.0

==== Speed skating ====
- World Cup 3 in Hamar, Norway:
  - 1500 m men: (gold) Shani Davis (USA) 1:44.27 (silver) Lucas Makowsky (CAN) 1:45.40 (bronze) Håvard Bøkko (NOR) 1:45.61
    - Standings after 3 of 6 races: (1) Davis 300 points (2) Bøkko 230 (3) Mark Tuitert (NED) 155
  - 5000 m women: (gold) Martina Sáblíková (CZE) 6:50.07 (silver) Stephanie Beckert (GER) 6:52.79 (bronze) Daniela Anschütz-Thoms (GER) 6:59.62
    - Standings after 3 of 6 races: (1) Sáblíková 280 points (2) Beckert 250 (3) Anschütz-Thoms 200

==== Volleyball ====
- Men's World Grand Champions Cup in Japan:
  - Round 3 in Nagoya:
    - Brazil 3–0 Poland
    - Cuba 3–2 Egypt
    - Japan 3–2 Iran
      - Standings: Brazil, Japan 6 points, Cuba 5, Iran 4, Egypt, Poland 3.

==== Weightlifting ====
- World Championships in Goyang, South Korea:
  - Men 62kg:
    - Snatch: (gold) Ding Jianjun (CHN) 146 kg (silver) Yang Fan (CHN) 144 kg (bronze) Eko Yuli Irawan (INA) 140 kg
    - Clean & Jerk: (gold) Irawan 175 kg (silver) Yang Sheng-Hsiung (TPE) 170 kg (bronze) Yang Fan 170 kg
    - Total: (gold) Ding 316 kg (silver) Irawan 315 kg (bronze) Yang Fan 314 kg
  - Women 48kg:
    - Snatch: (gold) Wang Mingjuan (CHN) 93 kg (silver) Nurcan Taylan (TUR) 90 kg (bronze) Sibel Özkan (TUR) 89 kg
    - Clean & Jerk: (gold) Özkan 117 kg (silver) Taylan 115 kg (bronze) Wang 115 kg
    - Total: (gold) Wang 208 kg (silver) Özkan 206 kg (bronze) Taylan 205 kg

=== November 20, 2009 (Friday) ===
==== American football ====
- NCAA BCS Top 10 (unbeaten team in **bold**)
  - (6) **Boise State** 52, Utah State 21

==== Cricket ====
- Sri Lanka in India:
  - 1st Test in Ahmedabad, day 5:
    - India 426 & 412/4 (129.0 ov, Gautam Gambhir 114, Sachin Tendulkar 100*); Sri Lanka 760/7d. **Match drawn, 3-match series level 0–0**.
- England in South Africa:
  - 1st ODI in Johannesburg:
    - **Match abandoned without a ball bowled, 5-match series level 0–0**.

==== Figure skating ====
- ISU Grand Prix:
  - Skate Canada International in Kitchener, Ontario, Canada:
    - Pairs' Short Program: (1) Aliona Savchenko/Robin Szolkowy (GER) 74.16 (2) Maria Mukhortova/Maxim Trankov (RUS) 65.80 (3) Jessica Dubé/Bryce Davison (CAN) 57.90
    - Ladies' Short Program: (1) Joannie Rochette (CAN) 70.00 (2) Alissa Czisny (USA) 63.52 (3) Mirai Nagasu (USA) 56.34
    - Ice Dance – Compulsory Dance: (1) Tessa Virtue/Scott Moir (CAN) 40.69 (2) Nathalie Péchalat/Fabian Bourzat (FRA) 35.55 (3) Kaitlyn Weaver/Andrew Poje (CAN) 32.18
    - Men's Short Program: (1) Jeremy Abbot (USA) 79.00 (2) Daisuke Takahashi (JPN) 76.30 (3) Denis Ten (KAZ) 75.45

==== Football (soccer) ====
- Beach Soccer World Cup in Dubai, United Arab Emirates:
  - Quarterfinals:
    - Japan 1–2 **Portugal**
    - Russia 2–4 **Switzerland**
    - **Brazil** 6–4 Italy
    - **Uruguay** 3–2 (ET) Spain

==== Luge ====
- World Cup in Calgary, Canada:
  - Doubles: (gold) Patric Leitner/Alexander Resch (GER) 1:27.855 (silver) André Florschütz/Torsten Wustlich (GER) 1:27.886 (bronze) Christian Oberstolz/Patrick Gruber (ITA) 1:28.059

==== Rugby union ====
- End of year tests:
  - Week 4:
    - Italy A 8–7 Georgia in Palmanova
    - Scotland A 38–7 Tonga in Galashiels

==== Skeleton ====
- World Cup in Lake Placid, United States:
  - Men: (gold) Frank Rommel (GER) 1:50.88 (silver) Sandro Stielicke (GER) 1:51.36 (bronze) Martins Dukurs (LAT) 1:51.37
    - Standings after 2 of 8 races: (1) Dukurs 425 points (2) Stielicke 420 (3) Rommel 417
  - Women: (gold) Mellisa Hollingsworth (CAN) 1:54.85 (silver) Shelley Rudman (GBR) 1:55.08 (bronze) Marion Trott (GER) 1:55.13
    - Standings after 2 of 8 races: (1) Hollingswoth 425 points (2) Rudman 402 (3) Amy Gough (CAN) 386

==== Weightlifting ====
- World Championships in Goyang, South Korea:
  - Men 56kg:
    - Snatch: (gold) Wu Jingbiao (CHN) 131 kg (silver) Long Qingquan (CHN) 130 kg (bronze) Khalil El Maoui (TUN) 125 kg
    - Clean & Jerk: (gold) Long 162 kg (silver) Wu 155 kg (bronze) Sergio Álvarez (CUB) 154 kg
    - Total: (gold) Long 292 kg (silver) Wu 286 kg (bronze) Álvarez 274 kg

=== November 19, 2009 (Thursday) ===
==== American football ====
- NFL Week 11:
  - Miami Dolphins 24, Carolina Panthers 17
    - Ricky Williams leads the Dolphins with three rushing touchdowns while filling in for Ronnie Brown, out for the rest of the season with a foot injury.

==== Baseball ====
- 2009 Major League Baseball awards:
  - National League Cy Young Award — Tim Lincecum, San Francisco Giants
    - Lincecum becomes the eighth pitcher to win the award in consecutive seasons.

==== Cricket ====
- Sri Lanka in India:
  - 1st Test in Ahmedabad, day 4:
    - India 426 & 190/2 (45.0 ov); Sri Lanka 760/7d (Mahela Jayawardene 275, Prasanna Jayawardene 154*). India trail by 144 runs with 8 wickets remaining.

==== Football (soccer) ====
- Copa Sudamericana Semifinals, second leg: (first leg score in parentheses)
  - **LDU Quito** (Ecuador) 7–0 (1–2) (Uruguay) River Plate. LDU Quito win 8–2 on aggregate.

==== Snooker ====
- Premier League Snooker – League phase in Llandudno, Wales: (players in **bold** advance to the semifinals)
  - Marco Fu (HKG) 5–1 Stephen Hendry (SCO)
  - **Ronnie O'Sullivan** (ENG) 2–4 **John Higgins** (SCO)
  - **Shaun Murphy** (ENG) 2–4 **Judd Trump** (ENG)
    - Final standings: Higgins 10 points, Trump 8, O'Sullivan 6, Murphy, Hendry, Neil Robertson 5, Fu 3.

==== Volleyball ====
- Men's World Grand Champions Cup in Japan:
  - Round 2 in Osaka:
    - Iran 1–3 Brazil
    - Poland 1–3 Cuba
    - Egypt 1–3 Japan
      - Standings: Japan, Brazil 4 points, Cuba, Iran 3, Egypt, Poland 2.

=== November 18, 2009 (Wednesday) ===
==== Baseball ====
- 2009 Major League Baseball awards:
  - Manager of the Year:
    - American League — Mike Scioscia, Los Angeles Angels
    - National League — Jim Tracy, Colorado Rockies

==== Cricket ====
- Sri Lanka in India:
  - 1st Test in Ahmedabad, day 3:
    - India 426; Sri Lanka 591/5 (160.0 ov, Mahela Jayawardene 204*). Sri Lanka lead by 165 runs with 5 wickets remaining in the 1st innings.
      - Jayawardene becomes the seventh batsman in history to score six Test double-centuries, and Sri Lanka by far exceed their previous highest score in India of 420.

==== Football (soccer) ====
- 2010 FIFA World Cup qualification: (teams in **bold** qualify for 2010 FIFA World Cup)
  - UEFA Playoffs, second leg: (first leg score in parentheses)
    - Ukraine 0–1 (0–0) **Greece**. Greece win 1–0 on aggregate.
    - **Slovenia** 1–0 (1–2) Russia. 2–2 on aggregate, Slovenia win on away goals.
      - Greece and Slovenia both qualify for the World Cup for the second time.
    - Bosnia and Herzegovina 0–1 (0–1) **Portugal**. Portugal win 2–0 on aggregate.
    - **France** 1–1 (ET) (1–0) Republic of Ireland. France win 2–1 on aggregate.
      - The reigning World Cup runners-up qualify for the Finals thanks to a controversial goal by William Gallas in the 13th minute of extra time after Thierry Henry handled the ball.
  - COMNEBOL / CONCACAF Intercontinental Playoffs, second leg: (first leg score in parentheses)
    - **Uruguay** 1–1 (1–0) Costa Rica. Uruguay win 2–1 on aggregate.
  - CAF third round:
    - Group C tiebreaker play-offs in Omdurman, Sudan:
      - **Algeria** 1–0 Egypt
        - A goal by Antar Yahia in the 40th minute puts the Desert Foxes in the World Cup Finals for the third time after a break of 24 years.
- Beach Soccer World Cup in Dubai, United Arab Emirates: (teams in **bold** advance to the quarterfinals)
  - Group A:
    - **Portugal** 6–1 Solomon Islands
    - United Arab Emirates 0–4 **Uruguay**
      - Final standings: Uruguay, Portugal 6 points, UAE, Solomon Islands 3.
  - Group B:
    - **Spain** 9–6 Ivory Coast
    - **Japan** 7–2 El Salvador
      - Final standings: Japan 8 points, Spain 6, Côte d'Ivoire 3, El Salvador 0.
  - Group C:
    - Costa Rica 1–3 **Italy**
    - **Russia** 3–3 (3–4 pen.) Argentina
      - Final standings: Russia 6 points, Italy, Argentina 5, Costa Rica 0.
  - Group D:
    - Nigeria 9–3 Bahrain
    - **Brazil** 4–2 **Switzerland**
      - Final standings: Brazil 9 points, Switzerland 6, Nigeria 3, Bahrain 0.
- 2011 FIFA Women's World Cup qualification (UEFA):
  - Group 5: Malta 0–2 Austria
    - Standings: Spain 9 points (3 matches), England 3 (1), Austria 3 (3).
- 2011 Asian Cup qualification: (teams in **bold** qualify for 2011 AFC Asian Cup)
  - Group A:
    - Hong Kong 0–4 Japan
    - Bahrain 4–0 Yemen
      - Standings: Bahrain 9 points (3 matches), Japan 9 (4), Yemen 3 (3), Hong Kong 0 (4).
  - Group B: Indonesia 1–1 Kuwait
    - Standings after 4 matches: Kuwait, Australia 7 points, Oman 4, Indonesia 3.
  - Group C: Malaysia 1–3 **Uzbekistan**
    - Standings: Uzbekistan 9 points (3 matches), UAE 3 (2), Malaysia 0 (3).
  - Group D: **Syria** 0–0 Vietnam
    - Standings: Syria 10 points (4 matches), China 6 (3), Vietnam 4 (4), Lebanon 0 (3).
  - Group E: Thailand 0–1 Singapore
    - Standings: Iran 7 points (3 matches), Singapore 6 (4), Thailand 5 (4), Jordan 1 (3).
- Copa Sudamericana Semifinals, second leg: (first leg score in parentheses)
  - **Fluminense** (Brazil) 2–1 (1–0) (Paraguay) Cerro Porteño. Fluminense win 3–1 on aggregate.
- (Colombia) Colombian Cup Final, second leg: (first leg score in parentheses)
  - **Santa Fe** 2–1 (1–2) Deportivo Pasto. 3–3 on aggregate, Santa Fe win 5–4 in penalty shootout.

==== Volleyball ====
- Men's World Grand Champions Cup in Japan:
  - Round 1 in Osaka:
    - Egypt 2–3 Iran
    - Cuba 2–3 Brazil
    - Japan 3–2 Poland

=== November 17, 2009 (Tuesday) ===
==== American football ====
- NFL news:
  - The Buffalo Bills, currently 3–6, become the first team this season to fire its head coach, axing Dick Jauron. The team's defensive coordinator, Perry Fewell, is named interim head coach, becoming the team's first black head coach.

==== Baseball ====
- 2009 Major League Baseball awards:
  - American League Cy Young Award — Zack Greinke, Kansas City Royals

==== Cricket ====
- Sri Lanka in India:
  - 1st Test in Ahmedabad, day 2:
    - India 426 (104.5 ov, Rahul Dravid 177); Sri Lanka 275/3 (70.0 ov, Tillakaratne Dilshan 112). Sri Lanka trail by 151 runs with 7 wickets remaining in the 1st innings.
      - Dilshan scores the first century by a Sri Lankan player in India since 1997.

==== Football (soccer) ====
- Beach Soccer World Cup in Dubai, United Arab Emirates: (teams in **bold** advance to the quarterfinals)
  - Group A:
    - Portugal 1–2 Uruguay
    - Solomon Islands 1–7 United Arab Emirates
      - Standings: UAE, Portugal, Uruguay, Solomon Islands 3 points.
  - Group B:
    - **Japan** 3–2 Ivory Coast
    - El Salvador 3–7 Spain
      - Standings: Japan 5 points, Spain, Côte d'Ivoire 3, El Salvador 0.
  - Group C:
    - Costa Rica 0–6 Argentina
    - Italy 1–3 **Russia**
      - Standings: Russia 6 points, Argentina 3, Italy 2, Costa Rica 0.
  - Group D:
    - Nigeria 2–7 **Switzerland**
    - Bahrain 1–8 **Brazil**
      - Standings: Brazil, Switzerland 6 points, Bahrain, Nigeria 0.
- 2011 FIFA Women's World Cup qualification (UEFA):
  - Group 6: Israel 1–6 Russia
    - Standings: Russia 9 points (3 matches), Switzerland 6 (3), Ireland 6 (4), Israel 3 (3).

==== Rugby union ====
- End of year tests:
  - Week 4:
    - Saracens (England) 24–23 South Africa in London
      - Saracens come back from an 18–6 halftime deficit and send the Rugby World Cup holders to their third straight defeat of their current tour.

=== November 16, 2009 (Monday) ===
==== American football ====
- NFL Monday Night Football Week 10:
  - Baltimore Ravens 16, Cleveland Browns 0

==== Baseball ====
- 2009 Major League Baseball awards:
  - Rookies of the Year:
    - American League — Andrew Bailey, closer, Oakland Athletics
    - National League — Chris Coghlan, outfielder, Florida Marlins

==== Cricket ====
- Sri Lanka in India:
  - 1st Test in Ahmedabad, day 1:
    - India 385/6 (90.0 ov, Rahul Dravid 177*, Mahendra Singh Dhoni 110)
      - Dravid becomes the fifth player ever to reach 11,000 runs in Test matches.

==== Football (soccer) ====
- Beach Soccer World Cup in Dubai, United Arab Emirates:
  - Group A:
    - Uruguay 6–7 Solomon Islands
    - United Arab Emirates 5–7 Portugal
  - Group B:
    - Ivory Coast 7–6 El Salvador
    - Spain 5–5 (2–3 pen.) Japan
  - Group C:
    - Argentina 2–3 (ET) Italy
    - Russia 5–1 Costa Rica
  - Group D:
    - Switzerland 6–5 Bahrain
    - Brazil 11–5 Nigeria

=== November 15, 2009 (Sunday) ===
==== Alpine skiing ====
- Men's World Cup in Levi, Finland:
  - Slalom: (gold) Reinfried Herbst (AUT) 1:49.79 (silver) Ivica Kostelić (CRO) 1:50.07 (bronze) Jean-Baptiste Grange (FRA) 1:50.32
    - Overall standings after 2 of 34 races: (1) Kostelić 102 points (2) Herbst & Didier Cuche (SUI) 100

==== American football ====
- NFL Week 10 (unbeaten teams in **bold**):
  - Jacksonville Jaguars 24, New York Jets 22
  - Carolina Panthers 28, Atlanta Falcons 19
  - Washington Redskins 27, Denver Broncos 17
  - Cincinnati Bengals 18, Pittsburgh Steelers 12
  - Tennessee Titans 41, Buffalo Bills 17
  - **New Orleans Saints** 28, St. Louis Rams 23
  - Miami Dolphins 25, Tampa Bay Buccaneers 23
  - Minnesota Vikings 27, Detroit Lions 10
  - San Diego Chargers 31, Philadelphia Eagles 23
    - The Eagles' Donovan McNabb throws for 450 yards, and becomes the third quarterback this season with a 400-yard game.
  - Kansas City Chiefs 16, Oakland Raiders 10
  - Green Bay Packers 17, Dallas Cowboys 7
  - Arizona Cardinals 31, Seattle Seahawks 20
  - Sunday Night Football: **Indianapolis Colts** 35, New England Patriots 34
    - The Colts stay unbeaten after coming back from a 31–17 fourth-quarter deficit. After Patriots coach Bill Belichick makes a controversial decision not to punt when faced with 4th-and-2 inside the Pats' 30-yard-line with little more than 2 minutes left, the Colts take over on downs and cap off their comeback with a 1-yard Peyton Manning touchdown pass to Reggie Wayne with 16 seconds left.
  - Bye week: Houston Texans, New York Giants

==== Auto racing ====
- Chase for the Sprint Cup:
  - Checker O'Reilly Auto Parts 500 in Avondale, Arizona:
    - (1) Jimmie Johnson (California) (Chevrolet, Hendrick Motorsports) (2) Jeff Burton (Virginia) (Chevrolet, Richard Childress Racing) (3) Denny Hamlin (Virginia) (Toyota, Joe Gibbs Racing)
    - Standings (with 1 race remaining): (1) Johnson 6492 points (2) Mark Martin (Arkansas) (Chevrolet, Hendrick Motorsports) 6384 (3) Jeff Gordon (California) (Chevrolet, Hendrick Motorsports) 6323
      - Johnson will win a fourth consecutive Cup title by finishing 25th or better in next week's race at Homestead.

==== Badminton ====
- BWF Super Series:
  - Hong Kong Super Series in Hong Kong:
    - Women's singles: Wang Yihan (CHN) [3] def. Jiang Yanjiao (CHN) [6] 21–13 21–15
    - Mixed doubles: Robert Mateusiak/Nadieżda Kostiuczyk (POL) def. Nova Widianto/Liliyana Natsir (INA) [3] 22–20 21–16
    - Men's singles: Lee Chong Wei (MAS) [1] def. Peter Gade (DEN) [3] 21–13 13–21 21–16
    - Women's doubles: Ma Jin/Wang Xiaoli (CHN) [4] def. Du Jing/Yu Yang (CHN) [3] 16–21 21–19 21–12
    - Men's doubles: Jung Jae-sung/Lee Yong-dae (KOR) [3] def. Lars Paaske/Jonas Rasmussen (DEN) [7] 13–21 21–15 21–8

==== Canadian football ====
- Grey Cup Playoffs:
  - Division semifinals:
    - BC Lions 34, Hamilton Tiger-Cats 27 (OT)
    - Calgary Stampeders 24, Edmonton Eskimos 21

==== Cricket ====
- England in South Africa:
  - 2nd T20I in Centurion:
    - South Africa 241/6 (20/20 ov); England 157/8 (20/20 ov). **South Africa win by 84 runs. 2-match series drawn 1–1**.
      - South Africa score the second-highest total in Twenty20 Internationals history, including a record first-wicket partnership of 170 for Graeme Smith & Loots Bosman and a record 17 sixes.

==== Figure skating ====
- ISU Grand Prix:
  - Skate America in Lake Placid, New York, United States: (skaters in **bold** qualify for the Grand Prix Final)
    - Ladies: (gold) **Kim Yuna** (KOR) 187.98 (silver) Rachael Flatt (USA) 174.91 (bronze) Júlia Sebestyén (HUN) 159.03
      - Standings after 5 of 6 events: Kim, **Miki Ando** (JPN) 30 points, **Alena Leonova** (RUS), Ashley Wagner (USA) 24, Flatt 22.
    - Ice Dance: (gold) **Tanith Belbin/Benjamin Agosto** (USA) 195.85 (silver) **Anna Cappellini/Luca Lanotte** (ITA) 171.86 (bronze) Alexandra Zaretski/Roman Zaretski (ISR) 171.77
      - Standings after 5 events: **Meryl Davis/Charlie White** (USA), Belbin/Agosto 30 points, Cappellini/Lanotte 26, Sinead Kerr/John Kerr (GBR) 24, Jana Khokhlova/Sergei Novitski (RUS) 22.

==== Football (soccer) ====
- 2010 FIFA World Cup qualification: (teams in **bold** qualify for 2010 FIFA World Cup, teams in italics qualify for 2010 African Cup of Nations)
  - CAF third round, matchday 6:
    - Group D:
      - **Ghana** 2–2 Mali
        - Final standings: Ghana 13 points, Benin 10, Mali 9, Sudan 1.
- U-17 World Cup in Nigeria:
  - Third place match: Colombia 0–1 (bronze) **Spain**
  - Final: (gold) **Switzerland** 1–0 (silver) Nigeria
    - A goal by Haris Seferovic in the 63rd minute gives the Swiss their first ever football global trophy, and denies the Golden Eaglets a record fourth title.
- Chile Cup Final in Valparaíso:
  - **Unión San Felipe** 3–0 Municipal Iquique
    - Unión San Felipe win the Cup for the first time, and qualify for 2010 Copa Sudamericana.

==== Golf ====
- PGA Tour:
  - Fall Series:
    - Children's Miracle Network Classic in Lake Buena Vista, Florida:
      - Winner: Stephen Ames (CAN)/(TTO) 270 (−18) PO
        - Ames wins the final event of the PGA Tour season in a three-way playoff over George McNeill (USA), eliminated on the second playoff hole, and Justin Leonard (USA), eliminated on the first.
- European Tour:
  - UBS Hong Kong Open in Hong Kong, China:
    - Winner: Grégory Bourdy (FRA) 261 (−19)
  - JBWere Masters in Melbourne, Australia:
    - Winner: Tiger Woods (USA) 274 (−14)
      - Woods wins his first title in Australia.
- LPGA Tour:
  - Lorena Ochoa Invitational in Guadalajara, Mexico:
    - Winner: Michelle Wie (USA) 275 (−13)
      - Wie collects her first LPGA Tour win.

==== Rugby union ====
- End of year tests:
  - Week 3:
    - Japan 46–8 Canada in Sendai
    - Ireland 20–20 Australia in Dublin
      - Ireland equalise in the final minute with a try by captain Brian O'Driscoll, who became the 11th player in history to make his 100th Test appearance, and Ronan O'Gara's conversion, to deny the Wallabies a successful Grand Slam tour.

==== Short track speed skating ====
- World Cup in Marquette, Michigan, United States:
  - Men:
    - 1000 m: (gold) Apolo Anton Ohno (USA) (silver) Lee Jung-Su (KOR) (bronze) François Hamelin (CAN)
      - Final standings: (gold) Lee 2600 points (silver) Ohno 1722 (bronze) Charles Hamelin (CAN) 1650
    - 5000 m Relay: (gold) Canada (silver) United States (bronze) South Korea
      - Final standings: (gold) South Korea 3000 points (silver) Canada 2600 (bronze) China 2080
  - Women:
    - 1000 m: (gold) Wang Meng (CHN) (silver) Katherine Reutter (USA) (bronze) Park Seung-Hi (KOR)
      - Final standings: (gold) Wang 2600 points (silver) Reutter 2312 (bronze) Zhou Yang (CHN) 1738
    - 3000 m Relay: (gold) China (silver) South Korea (bronze) Canada
      - Final standings: (gold) China 3000 points (silver) South Korea 2210 (bronze) United States 2112

==== Speed skating ====
- World Cup 2 in Heerenveen, Netherlands:
  - 1000 m women: (gold) Christine Nesbitt (CAN) 1:15.47 (silver) Annette Gerritsen (NED) 1:16.03 (bronze) Natasja Bruintjes (NED) 1:16.08
    - Standings after 2 of 7 races: (1) Nesbitt 200 (2) Gerritsen 125 (3) Margot Boer (NED) 120
  - 1000 m men: (gold) Shani Davis (USA) 1:08.48 (silver) Simon Kuipers (NED) 1:09.06 (bronze) Mo Tae-bum (KOR) 1:09.11
    - Standings after 2 of 7 races: (1) Davis 200 points (2) Mark Tuitert (NED) 120 (3) Mun Jun (KOR) 115
  - Team pursuit women: (gold) Canada 3:00.39 (silver) Netherlands 3:02.12 (bronze) Russia 3:02.40
  - Team pursuit men: (gold) United States & Netherlands 3:43.94 (bronze) Italy 3:45.62

==== Tennis ====
- ATP World Tour:
  - BNP Paribas Masters in Paris, France:
    - Final: Novak Djokovic (SRB) def. Gaël Monfils (FRA) 6–2, 5–7, 7–6(3)
      - Djokovic wins his 5th title of the year and 16th of his career. It's his first win in five Masters Series finals this year, and fifth Masters Series title of his career.

==== Volleyball ====
- Women's World Grand Champions Cup in Japan:
  - Round 5 in Fukuoka:
    - Brazil 3–0 Thailand
    - South Korea 0–3 Dominican Republic
    - Japan 1–3 Italy
      - Final standings: (gold) Italy 10 points, (silver) Brazil 9, (bronze) Dominican Republic 8, Japan 7, Korea 6, Thailand 5.
        - Italy win the title for the first time.

=== November 14, 2009 (Saturday) ===
==== Alpine skiing ====
- Women's World Cup in Levi, Finland:
  - Slalom: (gold) Maria Riesch (GER) 1:48.71 (silver) Lindsey Vonn (USA) 1:48.79 (bronze) Tanja Poutiainen (FIN) 1:49.87
    - Overall standings after 2 of 33 events: (1) Poutiainen 160 points (2) Riesch 113 (3) Vonn 109

==== American football ====
- NCAA:
  - BCS Top 10 (unbeaten teams in **bold**):
    - (1) **Florida** 24, South Carolina 14
    - (2) **Alabama** 31, Mississippi State 3
    - (3) **Texas** 47, Baylor 14
      - Texas quarterback Colt McCoy wins his 42nd game as a starter, tying the FBS record of former Georgia QB David Greene.
    - (4) **TCU** 55, (16) Utah 28
    - (6) **Boise State** 63, Idaho 25
    - (7) Georgia Tech 49, Duke 10
      - The Yellow Jackets book a trip to Tampa for the ACC Championship Game.
    - (8) LSU 24, Louisiana Tech 16
    - Stanford 55, (9) USC 21
      - The Cardinal hand the Trojans their worst home loss since 1966, and put up the highest score of any USC opponent in history.
    - (11) Ohio State 27, (10) Iowa 24 (OT)
      - Devin Barclay's 39-yard field goal in the first overtime gives the Buckeyes the Big Ten's automatic BCS berth, most likely putting them in the Rose Bowl.
    - Played earlier this week: (5) **Cincinnati**
  - Other games:
    - North Carolina 33, (14) Miami 24
    - UCF 37, (15) Houston 32
    - California 24, (17) Arizona 16

==== Auto racing ====
- Nationwide Series:
  - Able Body Labor 200 in Avondale, Arizona:
    - (1) Carl Edwards (Missouri) (Ford, Roush Fenway Racing) (2) Kevin Harvick (California) (Chevrolet, Kevin Harvick Incorporated) (3) Reed Sorenson (Georgia (U.S. state)) (Toyota, Braun Racing)
    - Standings (with 1 race remaining): (1) Kyle Busch (Nevada) (Toyota, Joe Gibbs Racing) 5487 points (2) Edwards 5297 (3) Brad Keselowski (Michigan) (Chevrolet, JR Motorsports) 5242
      - Busch needs only to start next week's race at Homestead to claim the season title.

==== Baseball ====
- KBO-NPB Club Championship in Nagasaki, Japan:
  - Yomiuri Giants (JPN) 9, Kia Tigers (KOR) 4

==== Bobsleigh ====
- World Cup in Park City, United States:
  - Four-man: (gold) Lyndon Rush/Chris le Bihan/Dan Humphries/Lascelles Brown (CAN) 1:36.43 (silver) Jānis Miņins/Daumants Dreiškens/Oskars Melbārdis/Intars Dambis (LAT) & Dmitry Abramovitch/Filipp Yegorov/Dmitriy Stepushkin/Sergey Prudnikov (RUS) 1:36.45

==== Boxing ====
- Miguel Angel Cotto vs. Manny Pacquiao in Las Vegas: TV bouts:
  - (Philippines) Manny Pacquiao def. (Puerto Rico) Miguel Angel Cotto via TKO in the 12th round after the referee stopped the fight to win the WBO welterweight championship.
    - Cotto was knocked down thrice before the referee stopped the fight.
  - (Mexico) Julio César Chávez Jr. KOd (United States) Troy Rowland in the 7th round.
  - (Israel) Yuri Foreman def. (Puerto Rico) Daniel Santos via unanimous decision.

==== Canadian football ====
- CIS football championships (CIS Top Ten rankings in parentheses):
  - Hardy Cup Canada West championship game:
    - (2) Calgary Dinos 39, (3) Saskatchewan Huskies 38
  - Yates Cup OUA championship game:
    - (4) Queen's Golden Gaels 43, (5) Western Ontario Mustangs 39
  - Dunsmore Cup QUFL championship game:
    - (1) Laval Rouge-et-Or 31, (8) Montreal Carabins 7
  - Loney Bowl AUS championship game:
    - (6) Saint Mary's Huskies 31, (10) St. Francis Xavier X-Men 22

==== Figure skating ====
- ISU Grand Prix:
  - Skate America in Lake Placid, New York, United States: (skaters in **bold** qualify for the Grand Prix Final)
    - Ice Dance – standings after Original Dance: (1) Tanith Belbin/Benjamin Agosto (USA) 100.23 (2) Jana Khokhlova/Sergei Novitski (RUS) 86.47 (3) Anna Cappellini/Luca Lanotte (ITA) 86.13
    - Pairs: (gold) **Shen Xue/Zhao Hongbo** (CHN) 201.40 (silver) Tatiana Volosozhar/Stanislav Morozov (UKR) 171.82 (bronze) Zhang Dan/Zhang Hao (CHN) 168.19
      - Standings after 5 of 6 events: Shen/Zhao, **Pang Qing/Tong Jian** (CHN) 30 points, **Yuko Kavaguti/Alexander Smirnov** (RUS) 26, Zhang/Zhang, Volosozhar/Morozov 24.
    - Ladies' Short Program: (1) Kim Yuna (KOR) 76.28 (WR) (2) Rachael Flatt (USA) 58.80 (3) Júlia Sebestyén (HUN) 58.54
      - Kim improves her own world record from the 2009 World Championships by 0.12 points.
    - Men: (gold) **Evan Lysacek** (USA) 237.72 (silver) Shawn Sawyer (CAN) 203.91 (bronze) Ryan Bradley (USA) 198.12
      - Standings after 5 events: **Nobunari Oda** (JPN) 30 points, Lysacek 28, **Brian Joubert** (FRA) 24, **Johnny Weir** (USA) 22, Tomáš Verner (CZE) 20.

==== Football (soccer) ====
- 2010 FIFA World Cup qualification: (teams in **bold** qualify for 2010 FIFA World Cup)
  - UEFA Playoffs, first leg:
    - Republic of Ireland 0–1 France
    - Portugal 1–0 Bosnia and Herzegovina
    - Greece 0–0 Ukraine
    - Russia 2–1 Slovenia
  - CONMEBOL / CONCACAF Intercontinental Playoffs, first leg:
    - Costa Rica 0–1 Uruguay
  - CAF third round, matchday 6: (teams in italics qualify for 2010 African Cup of Nations)
    - Group A:
      - Togo 1–0 Gabon
      - Morocco 0–2 **Cameroon**
        - The Indomitable Lions qualify for the World Cup for the sixth time.
        - Final standings: Cameroon 13 points, Gabon 9, Togo 8, Morocco 3.
    - Group B:
      - Mozambique 1–0 Tunisia
      - Kenya 2–3 **Nigeria**
        - 83rd-minute goals by Obafemi Martins for Nigeria and Dário for Mozambique give the Super Eagles their passage to the World Cup Finals for the fourth time.
        - Final standings: Nigeria 12 points, Tunisia 11, Mozambique 7, Kenya 3.
    - Group C:
      - Rwanda 0–0 Zambia
      - Egypt 2–0 Algeria
        - Goals by Amr Zaki after 2 minutes and Emad Moteab in the 5th minute of injury time put the Pharaohs level with the Desert Foxes at the top of the group and send the teams to a tiebreaker playoff match in Omdurman, Sudan, on November 18.
        - Final standings: Algeria, Egypt 13 points, Zambia 5, Rwanda 2.
    - Group D:
      - Sudan 1–2 Benin
        - Standings: **Ghana** 12 points (5 matches), Benin 10 (6), Mali 8 (5), Sudan 1 (6).
    - Group E:
      - Burkina Faso 1–0 Malawi
      - **Ivory Coast** 3–0 Guinea
        - Final standings: Côte d'Ivoire 16 points, Burkina Faso 12, Malawi 4, Guinea 3.
  - OFC / AFC Intercontinental Playoffs, second leg: (first leg score in parentheses)
    - **New Zealand** 1–0 (0–0) Bahrain. New Zealand win 1–0 on aggregate.
      - Rory Fallon scores in the 45th minute, and goalkeeper Mark Paston saves a penalty from Sayed Mohamed Adnan, to lift the All Whites to the World Cup Finals for the second time, while Bahrain is eliminated in the intercontinental playoffs for the second straight time.
- 2011 FIFA Women's World Cup qualification (UEFA):
  - Group 4: Hungary 1–1 Ukraine
- 2011 Asian Cup qualification:
  - Group B:
    - Kuwait 2–1 Indonesia
    - Oman 1–2 Australia
  - Group C:
    - Uzbekistan 3–1 Malaysia
  - Group D:
    - Vietnam 0–1 Syria
    - Lebanon 0–2 China
  - Group E:
    - Singapore 1–3 Thailand
    - Iran 1–0 Jordan
- Friendly international matches: (teams in **bold** have qualified for 2010 FIFA World Cup)
  - Belgium 3–0 Hungary
  - **Brazil** 1–0 **England** in Doha, Qatar
  - Croatia 5–0 Liechtenstein
  - **Denmark** 0–0 **South Korea**
  - Estonia 0–0 Albania
  - **Italy** 0–0 **Netherlands**
  - Luxembourg 1–1 Iceland
  - North Macedonia 3–0 Canada
  - Northern Ireland 0–1 **Serbia**
  - Poland 0–1 Romania
  - Saudi Arabia 1–1 Belarus
  - **Slovakia** 1–0 **United States**
  - **South Africa** 0–0 **Japan**
  - **Spain** 2–1 **Argentina**
  - **Switzerland** 0–1 Norway
  - Wales 3–0 Scotland
- (United States) MLS Cup Playoffs:
  - Eastern Conference finals:
    - **Real Salt Lake** 0, Chicago Fire 0. Real Salt Lake win 5–4 in penalty shootout.

==== Gymnastics ====
- Trampoline World Championships in Saint Petersburg, Russia:
  - Double Mini Men: (gold) André Lico (POR) 75.500 (silver) Tim Lunding (SWE) 69.600 (bronze) André Fernandes (POR) 69.300
  - Tumbling Men: (gold) Tagir Murtazaev (RUS) 77.300 (silver) Yang Song (CHN) 75.000 (bronze) Mikhail Kostyanov (RUS) 73.900
  - Double Mini Women: (gold) Victoria Voronina (RUS) 68.300 (silver) Galina Goncharenko (RUS) 68.000 (bronze) Corissa Boychuk (CAN) 67.100
  - Trampoline Synchro Men: (gold) Tetsuya Sotomura/Yasuhiro Ueyama (JPN) 50.800 (silver) Sébastien Martiny/Grégoire Pennes (FRA) 50.000 (bronze) Oleksandr Chernonos/Yuriy Nikitin (UKR) 50.000
  - Tumbling Women: (gold) Anna Korobeynikova (RUS) 69.400 (silver) Elena Krasnokutskaya (RUS) 66.900 (bronze) Ashley Speed (CAN) 62.800
  - Individual Trampoline Women: (gold) Huang Shanshan (CHN) 39.500 (silver) He Wenna (CHN) 39.400 (bronze) Karen Cockburn (CAN) 38.700

==== Rugby league ====
- Four Nations Final in Leeds, England:
  - **Australia** 46–16 England
    - Australia win the tournament for the fourth time.
- Atlantic Cup in Jacksonville, Florida, United States:
  - **United States** 37–22 Jamaica

==== Rugby union ====
- End of year tests:
  - Week 3:
    - Italy 6–20 New Zealand in Milan
    - England 16–9 Argentina in London
    - Scotland 23–10 Fiji in Edinburgh
    - Georgia 24–22 Argentina XV in Tbilisi
- 2011 Rugby World Cup qualifying:
  - Africa Round 3, first leg:
    - Tunisia 13–18 Namibia in Tunis
  - Americas Round 4, first leg:
    - Uruguay 22–27 United States in Montevideo

==== Short track speed skating ====
- World Cup in Marquette, Michigan, United States:
  - Men:
    - 1500 m: (gold) Lee Jung-Su (KOR) 2:13.595 (silver) Apolo Anton Ohno (USA) 2:13.731 (bronze) Charles Hamelin (CAN) 2:14.216
      - Final standings: (gold) Lee 2440 points (silver) Hamelin 2152 (bronze) Sung Si-Bak (KOR) 1869
    - 500 m: (gold) François-Louis Tremblay (CAN) 40.684 (silver) Thibaut Fauconnet (FRA) 40.909 (bronze) Sung Si-Bak (KOR) 40.651
      - Final standings: (gold) Charles Hamelin (CAN) 2328 points (silver) Tremblay 2024 (bronze) Sung 1608
  - Women:
    - 1500 m: (gold) Zhou Yang (CHN) 2:22.700 (silver) Liu Qiuhong (CHN) 2:22.870 (bronze) Lee Eun-Byul (KOR) 2:22.919
      - Final standings: (gold) Zhou 2640 points (silver) Lee 2440 (bronze) Katherine Reutter (USA) 1968
    - 500 m: (gold) Wang Meng (CHN) 42.961 (silver) Kalyna Roberge (CAN) 43.267 (bronze) Marianne St-Gelais CAN 43.373
      - Final standings: (gold) Wang 3000 points (silver) Roberge 2240 (bronze) Zhao Nannan (CHN) 1952

==== Speed skating ====
- World Cup 2 in Heerenveen, Netherlands:
  - 500 m women: (gold) Jenny Wolf (GER) 37.83 (silver) Wang Beixing (CHN) 38.07 (bronze) Annette Gerritsen (NED) 38.18
    - Standings after 4 of 12 races: (1) Wolf 380 points (2) Wang 340 (3) Gerritsen 270
  - 500 m men: (gold) Joji Kato (JPN) 34.98 (silver) Jan Smeekens (NED) 35.02 (bronze) Lee Kang-seok (KOR) 35.13
    - Standings after 4 of 12 races: (1) Lee 310 points (2) Keiichiro Nagashima (JPN) 251 (3) Tucker Fredricks (USA) 246
  - 1500 m women: (gold) Ireen Wüst (NED) 1:56.69 (silver) Christine Nesbitt (CAN) 1:56.74 (bronze) Kristina Groves (CAN) 1:57.05
    - Standings after 2 of 6 races: (1) Nesbitt 180 points (2) Groves 130 (3) Wüst 124
  - 5000 m men: (gold) Sven Kramer (NED) 6:16.29 (silver) Bob de Jong (NED) 6:16.38 (bronze) Håvard Bøkko (NOR) 6:17.10
    - Standings after 2 of 6 races: (1) Kramer 200 points (2) de Jong 150 (3) Bøkko 150

==== Volleyball ====
- Women's World Grand Champions Cup in Japan:
  - Round 4 in Fukuoka:
    - Thailand 2–3 South Korea
    - Italy 3–0 Brazil
    - Dominican Republic 3–1 Japan
      - Standings: Italy 8 points, Brazil 7, Japan, Dominican Republic 6, Korea 5, Thailand 4.

=== November 13, 2009 (Friday) ===
==== American football ====
- NCAA:
  - BCS Top 10 (unbeaten team in **bold**):
    - (5) **Cincinnati** 24, (25) West Virginia 21
      - The Bearcats go to 10–0 for the first time in history.

==== Auto racing ====
- Camping World Truck Series:
  - Ron Hornaday Jr. clinches his record fourth Truck Series title by finishing fourth at the Lucas Oil 150, the first of three NASCAR races this weekend at Phoenix. The 51-year-old Hornaday also becomes the oldest driver ever to win a season title in a NASCAR national touring series.

==== Basketball ====
- College basketball news:
  - Harry Statham, head coach at the NAIA school McKendree, becomes the first men's coach at a four-year school to reach 1,000 career wins. (AP via ESPN)

==== Bobsleigh ====
- World Cup in Park City, United States:
  - Women: (gold) Cathleen Martini/Romy Logsch (GER) 1:39.92 (silver) Sandra Kiriasis/Berit Wiacker (GER) 1:40.12 (bronze) Erin Pac/Michelle Rzepka (USA) 1:40.32
  - Two-man: (gold) Beat Hefti/Alex Baumann (SUI) 1:37.08 (silver) Todd Hays/Steven Langton (USA) 1:37.19 (bronze) Ivo Rüegg/Cedric Grand (SUI) 1:37.25

==== Cricket ====
- England in South Africa:
  - 1st T20I in Johannesburg:
    - England 202/6 (20/20 ov); South Africa 127/3 (13/13 ov). **England win by 1 run (D/L method), lead the 2-match series 1–0**.
- Pakistan v New Zealand in UAE:
  - 2nd T20I in Dubai:
    - Pakistan 153/5 (20/20 ov); New Zealand 146/5 (20/20 ov). **Pakistan win by 7 runs, win the 2-match series 2–0**.

==== Figure skating ====
- ISU Grand Prix:
  - Skate America in Lake Placid, New York, United States:
    - Ice Dance – Compulsory Dance: (1) Tanith Belbin/Benjamin Agosto (USA) 39.28 (2) Jana Khokhlova/Sergei Novitski (RUS) 36.94 (3) Anna Cappellini/Luca Lanotte (ITA) 32.04
    - Pairs' Short Program: (1) Shen Xue/Zhao Hongbo (CHN) 74.36 (2) Tatiana Volosozhar/Stanislav Morozov (UKR) 61.70 (3) Meagan Duhamel/Craig Buntin (CAN) 59.64
    - Men's Short Program: (1) Evan Lysacek (USA) 79.17 (2) Florent Amodio (FRA) 72.65 (3) Brandon Mroz (USA) 71.40

==== Football (soccer) ====
- (United States) MLS Cup Playoffs:
  - Western Conference finals:
    - Los Angeles Galaxy 2, Houston Dynamo 0 (OT)
      - The Galaxy advance to the MLS Cup for a record sixth time.

==== Gymnastics ====
- Trampoline World Championships in Saint Petersburg, Russia:
  - Double Mini Women Team: (gold) Russia 105.100 (silver) Canada 102.600 (bronze) United States 101.900
  - Tumbling Women Team: (gold) Russia 100.900 (silver) United States 94.000 (bronze) Canada 93.400
  - Double Mini Men Team: (gold) Portugal 110.800 (silver) Russia 110.500 (bronze) United States 98.700
  - Trampoline Synchro Women: (gold) Li Dan/Zhong Xingping (CHN) 47.600 (silver) Karen Cockburn/Rosannagh MacLennan (CAN) 46.900 (bronze) Anna Savkina/Ekaterina Khilko (UZB) 45.300
  - Tumbling Men Team: (gold) China 110.900 (silver) Russia 109.400 (bronze) Belarus 104.500
  - Individual Trampoline Men: (gold) Dong Dong (CHN) 42.900 (silver) Lu Chunlong (CHN) 42.300 (bronze) Yasuhiro Ueyama (JPN) 42.100

==== Rugby union ====
- End of year tests:
  - Week 3:
    - Wales 17–13 Samoa in Cardiff
    - France 20–13 South Africa in Toulouse
    - Ireland A 48–19 Tonga in Belfast
    - Italy A 33–6 Romania in Piacenza

==== Speed skating ====
- World Cup 2 in Heerenveen, Netherlands:
  - 500 m women: (gold) Jenny Wolf (GER) 37.92 (silver) Wang Beixing (CHN) 38.19 (bronze) Annette Gerritsen (NED) 38.23
  - 500 m men: (gold) Keiichiro Nagashima (JPN) 34.98 (silver) Tucker Fredricks (USA) 35.00 (bronze) Ronald Mulder (NED) 35.07
  - 3000 m women: (gold) Stephanie Beckert (GER) 4:05.29 (silver) Martina Sáblíková (CZE) 4:05.68 (bronze) Daniela Anschütz-Thoms (GER) 4:05.73
    - Standings after 2 of 6 races: (1) Sáblíková 180 (2) Beckert 170 (3) Anschütz-Thoms 130
  - 1500 m men: (gold) Shani Davis (USA) 1:44.48 (silver) Håvard Bøkko (NOR) 1:45.57 (bronze) Stefan Groothuis (NED) 1:45.74
    - Standings after 2 of 6 races: (1) Davis 200 (2) Bøkko 160 (3) Groothuis 130

=== November 12, 2009 (Thursday) ===
==== American football ====
- NFL Week 10:
  - San Francisco 49ers 10, Chicago Bears 6
- NCAA:
  - BCS Top 25:
    - Rutgers 31, (24) South Florida 0

==== Basketball ====
- Euroleague:
  - Regular Season Game 4:
    - Group B:
      - Lietuvos Rytas (Lithuania) 78–56 (Serbia) Partizan
      - Olympiacos (Greece) 105–90 (Turkey) Efes Pilsen
        - Standings: Unicaja 4–0, Olympiacos, Lietuvos Rytas 3–1, Efes Pilsen, Partizan 1–3, Orléans 0–4.
    - Group C:
      - Lottomatica Roma (Italy) 90–92 (OT) (Israel) Maccabi Tel Aviv
        - Standings: Roma, Maccabi, Caja Laboral 3–1, CSKA Moscow 2–2, Maroussi 1–3, Olimpija 0–4.
    - Group D:
      - Armani Jeans Milano (Italy) 68–72 (Russia) Khimki Moscow Region
        - Standings: Panathinaikos, Real Madrid, Khimki 3–1, Milano, Asseco Prokom, EWE Baskets 1–3.
- NBA news:
  - The New Orleans Hornets become the first team this season to fire its head coach, dismissing Byron Scott after a 3–6 start. (ESPN)

==== Cricket ====
- Pakistan v New Zealand in UAE:
  - 1st T20I in Dubai:
    - Pakistan 161/8 (20/20 ov); New Zealand 112 (18.3/20 ov). **Pakistan win by 49 runs, lead the 2-match series 1–0**.

==== Football (soccer) ====
- U-17 World Cup in Nigeria:
  - Semifinals:
    - Colombia 0–4 **Switzerland**
    - Spain 1–3 **Nigeria**
- UEFA Women's Champions League Round of 16, second leg: (first leg score in parentheses)
  - **Lyon** (France) 5–0 (1–0) (Denmark) Fortuna Hjørring. Lyon win 6–0 on aggregate.
- Copa Sudamericana Semifinals, first leg:
  - River Plate (Uruguay) 2–1 (Ecuador) LDU Quito

==== Gymnastics ====
- Trampoline World Championships in Saint Petersburg, Russia:
  - Trampoline Women Team: (gold) China 117.00 (silver) Russia 110.30 (bronze) Canada 109.60
  - Trampoline Men Team: (gold) China 126.70 (silver) Belarus 120.50 (bronze) Russia 117.00

==== Rugby union ====
- Independent arbitrators appointed by SANZAR, the body that operates the Tri Nations and Super 14 competitions, award the 15th Super Rugby franchise to Melbourne. The new team will begin play in an expanded Super 15 competition in 2011. (Australian Associated Press)

==== Skeleton ====
- World Cup in Park City, United States:
  - Men: (gold) Martins Dukurs (LAT) 1:39.75 (silver) Sandro Stielicke (GER) 1:40.27 (bronze) Kristan Bromley (GBR) 1:40.37
  - Women: (gold) Anja Huber (GER) 51.22 (silver) Amy Gough (CAN) 51.36 (bronze) Mellisa Hollingsworth (CAN) 51.37
    - The second heat was cancelled because of snow and strong winds.

==== Snooker ====
- Premier League Snooker – League phase in Weston-super-Mare, Somerset: (players in **bold** advance to the semifinals)
  - **John Higgins** (SCO) 4–2 Judd Trump (ENG)
  - Shaun Murphy (ENG) 4–2 Neil Robertson (AUS)
    - Standings: Higgins 8 points (5 games), Trump, Ronnie O'Sullivan 6 (5), Stephen Hendry, Murphy 5 (5), Robertson 5 (6), Marco Fu 1 (5).

==== Volleyball ====
- Women's World Grand Champions Cup in Japan:
  - Round 3 in Tokyo:
    - South Korea 0–3 Brazil
    - Dominican Republic 0–3 Italy
    - Japan 3–0 Thailand
      - Standings: Brazil, Italy 6 points, Japan 5, Dominican Republic 4, Thailand, Korea 3.

=== November 11, 2009 (Wednesday) ===
==== Basketball ====
- Euroleague:
  - Regular Season Game 4 (unbeaten teams in **bold**):
    - Group A:
      - Cibona Zagreb (Croatia) 64–52 (Lithuania) Žalgiris Kaunas
      - Fenerbahçe Ülker İstanbul (Turkey) 83–87 (Italy) **Montepaschi Siena**
      - **Regal FC Barcelona** (Spain) 76–62 (France) ASVEL Villeurbanne
        - Standings: Siena and Barcelona 4–0, Fenerbahçe Ülker 2–2, Cibona and Žalgiris 1–3, Villeurbanne 0–4.
    - Group B:
      - Orléans (France) 74–86 (Spain) **Unicaja Málaga**
    - Group C:
      - Maroussi Athens (Greece) 86–103 (Spain) Caja Laboral Baskonia
      - CSKA Moscow (Russia) 79–69 (Slovenia) Union Olimpija Ljubljana
    - Group D:
      - Asseco Prokom Gdynia (Poland) 65–75 (Greece) Panathinaikos Athens
      - EWE Baskets Oldenburg (Germany) 61–104 (Spain) Real Madrid

==== Cricket ====
- Australia in India:
  - 7th ODI in Navi Mumbai:
    - **Match abandoned without a ball bowled. Australia win the 7-match series 4–2**.

==== Football (soccer) ====
- UEFA Women's Champions League Round of 16, second leg: (first leg score in parentheses)
  - **Torres** (Italy) 4–1 (4–1) (Austria) Neulengbach. Torres win 8–2 on aggregate.
  - **Arsenal** (England) 2–0 (3–0) (Czech Republic) Sparta Praha. Arsenal win 5–0 on aggregate.
  - Zvezda 2005 Perm (Russia) 1–1 (0–0) (Norway) **Røa**. 1–1 on aggregate, Røa win on away goals.
  - **Umeå** (Sweden) 1–1 (1–0) (Russia) Rossiyanka. Umeå win 2–1 on aggregate.
  - Bayern Munich (Germany) 0–1 (ET) (0–0) (France) **Montpellier**. Montpellier win 1–0 on aggregate.
  - Linköping (Sweden) 0–2 (1–1) (Germany) **Duisburg**. Duisburg win 3–1 on aggregate.
  - Brøndby (Denmark) 0–4 (0–1) (Germany) **Turbine Potsdam**. Turbine Potsdam win 5–0 on aggregate.
- Copa Sudamericana Semifinals, first leg:
  - Cerro Porteño (Paraguay) 0–1 (Brazil) Fluminense

==== Volleyball ====
- Women's World Grand Champions Cup in Japan:
  - Round 2 in Tokyo:
    - Thailand 1–3 Dominican Republic
    - Italy 3–2 South Korea
    - Brazil 3–1 Japan
      - Standings: Brazil, Italy 4 points, Japan, Dominican Republic 3, Thailand, Korea 2.

=== November 10, 2009 (Tuesday) ===
==== Cricket ====
- Zimbabwe in South Africa:
  - 2nd ODI in Centurion:
    - South Africa 331/5 (50 ov, Jean-Paul Duminy 111*); Zimbabwe 119 (34.3 ov). **South Africa win by 212 runs, win the 2-match series 2–0**.

==== Football (Soccer) ====
- (Spain) Copa del Rey Round of 32, second leg: (first leg score in parentheses)
  - Real Madrid 1–0 (0–4) Alcorcón
    - In a stunning result, Real Madrid is eliminated by third division team Alcorcón, 4–1 on aggregate.

==== Volleyball ====
- Women's World Grand Champions Cup in Japan:
  - Round 1 in Tokyo:
    - Thailand 0–3 Italy
    - Dominican Republic 0–3 Brazil
    - Japan 3–1 South Korea

=== November 9, 2009 (Monday) ===
==== American football ====
- NFL Monday Night Football Week 9:
  - Pittsburgh Steelers 28, Denver Broncos 10

==== Basketball ====
- NCAA:
  - Jim Boeheim becomes the eighth Division I coach to record 800 wins, reaching the mark in his 1,087th game, as Syracuse defeats Albany 75–43.

==== Cricket ====
- Pakistan v New Zealand in UAE:
  - 3rd ODI in Abu Dhabi:
    - New Zealand 211 (46.3 ov); Pakistan 204 (49.1 ov). **New Zealand win by 7 runs, win the 3-match series 2–1**.

==== Football (soccer) ====
- U-17 World Cup in Nigeria:
  - Quarterfinals:
    - **Spain** 3–3 (4–2 pen.) Uruguay
    - Korea Republic (South Korea) 1–3 **Nigeria**

==== Poker ====
- World Series of Poker in Las Vegas, Nevada, United States:
  - Joe Cada defeats Darvin Moon to win the US$8,547,042 first prize, and becomes the youngest winner of the US$10,000 Buy-in Main Event at the age of 21.

=== November 8, 2009 (Sunday) ===
==== American football ====
- NFL Week 9 (unbeaten teams in **bold**):
  - Atlanta Falcons 31, Washington Redskins 17
  - Arizona Cardinals 41, Chicago Bears 21
  - Cincinnati Bengals 17, Baltimore Ravens 7
  - **Indianapolis Colts** 20, Houston Texans 17
    - The Colts become the fourth team in NFL history to win 17 straight regular-season games and Jim Caldwell becomes the first rookie coach since 1930 to win his first eight games.
  - Jacksonville Jaguars 24, Kansas City Chiefs 21
  - New England Patriots 27, Miami Dolphins 17
  - Tampa Bay Buccaneers 38, Green Bay Packers 28
    - Josh Freeman passes for 205 yards and three touchdowns in his first game as starting quarterback and leads the Bucs to their first win after an 11-game losing streak.
  - **New Orleans Saints** 30, Carolina Panthers 20
    - The Saints rally from a 14–0 first-quarter deficit to stay unbeaten.
  - Seattle Seahawks 32, Detroit Lions 20
  - Tennessee Titans 34, San Francisco 49ers 27
  - San Diego Chargers 21, New York Giants 20
  - Sunday Night Football: Dallas Cowboys 20, Philadelphia Eagles 16
  - Bye week: Buffalo Bills, Cleveland Browns, Minnesota Vikings, New York Jets, Oakland Raiders, St. Louis Rams
- College football news:
  - In the BCS rankings, TCU rises to fourth—the highest ever for a school in a conference whose champion does not automatically qualify for one of the five BCS bowls.

==== Auto racing ====
- Chase for the Sprint Cup:
  - Dickies 500 in Fort Worth, Texas:
    - (1) Kurt Busch (Nevada) (Dodge, Penske Racing) (2) Denny Hamlin (Virginia) (Toyota, Joe Gibbs Racing) (3) Matt Kenseth (Wisconsin) (Ford, Roush Fenway Racing)
    - Drivers' standings (with 2 races remaining): (1) Jimmie Johnson (California) (Chevrolet, Hendrick Motorsports) 6297 points (2) Mark Martin (Arkansas) (Chevrolet, Hendrick Motorsports) 6224 (−79) (3) Jeff Gordon (California) (Chevrolet, Hendrick Motorsports) 6185 (−112)
      - An accident on Lap Three involving Johnson cuts his points lead, finishing 35th in the race.

==== Cricket ====
- Australia in India:
  - 6th ODI in Guwahati:
    - India 170 (48 ov); Australia 172/4 (41.5 ov). **Australia win by 6 wickets, clinch the series and lead the 7-match series 4–2**.
- Zimbabwe in South Africa:
  - 1st ODI in Benoni:
    - South Africa 295/5 (50 ov); Zimbabwe 250/6 (50 ov, Tatenda Taibu 103*). **South Africa win by 45 runs, lead the 2-match series 1–0**.

==== Figure skating ====
- ISU Grand Prix:
  - NHK Trophy in Nagano, Japan: (skaters in **bold** qualify for the Grand Prix Final)
    - Ice Dance: (gold) **Meryl Davis/Charlie White** (USA) 201.97 (silver) Sinead Kerr/John Kerr (GBR) 177.73 (bronze) Vanessa Crone/Paul Poirier (CAN) 165.89
      - Standings after 4 of 6 events: Davis/White 30 points, Kerr/Kerr 24, Crone/Poirier 20.

==== Football (soccer) ====
- U-17 World Cup in Nigeria:
  - Quarterfinals:
    - **Colombia** 1–1 (5–3 pen.) Turkey
    - **Switzerland** 2–1 Italy
- (United States) MLS Cup Playoffs:
  - Western Conference semifinals, second leg: (first leg score in parentheses)
    - **Houston Dynamo** 1 (0), Seattle Sounders FC 0 (0) (OT). Houston Dynamo win 1–0 on aggregate.
    - **Los Angeles Galaxy** 1 (2), Chivas USA 0 (2). Los Angeles Galaxy win 3–2 on aggregate.
- (Norway) Norwegian Cup Final in Oslo:
  - Molde 2–2 (4–5 pen.) **Aalesund**
    - Aalesund win the first trophy in their history, and qualify for next year's Europa League.
- (South Korea) Korean FA Cup Final in Seongnam:
  - Seongnam Ilhwa Chunma 1–1 (2–4 pen.) **Suwon Samsung Bluewings**
    - Suwon Bluewings win the Cup for the second time.
- Singapore Cup Final in Jalan Besar:
  - **Geylang United** (Singapore) 1–0 (Thailand) Bangkok Glass

==== Golf ====
- World Golf Championships:
  - HSBC Champions in Shanghai:
    - Winner: Phil Mickelson (USA) 271 (−17)
- LPGA Tour:
  - Mizuno Classic in Shima, Mie, Japan:
    - Winner: Bo Bae Song (KOR) 201 (−15)

==== Motorcycle racing ====
- Moto GP:
  - Valencian Grand Prix in Valencia: (1) Dani Pedrosa (ESP) (Honda) 46:47.553 (2) Valentino Rossi (ITA) (Yamaha) +2.630 (3) Jorge Lorenzo (ESP) (Yamaha) +2.913
    - Final riders' standings: (1) Rossi 306 points (2) Lorenzo 261 (3) Pedrosa 234
    - Final manufacturers' standings: (1) Yamaha 386 (2) Honda 297 (3) Ducati 272

==== Rugby league ====
- European Cup:
  - Final in Bridgend, Wales:
    - (silver) Scotland 16–28 (gold) **Wales**
      - Wales win the trophy for the fifth time.
  - 3rd place playoff in Maesteg, Wales:
    - (bronze) **Lebanon** 40–16 Ireland
  - 5th place playoff in Maesteg:
    - **Italy** 42–14 Serbia
      - Serbia will be relegated to the European Shield in 2010.

==== Short track speed skating ====
- World Cup in Montreal, Canada:
  - Men:
    - 1000 m: (gold) Sung Si-Bak (KOR) (silver) Lee Jung-Su (KOR) (bronze) Charles Hamelin (CAN)
    - 5000 m Relay: (gold) South Korea (silver) Canada (bronze) China
  - Women:
    - 1000 m: (gold) Zhou Yang (CHN) (silver) Wang Meng (CHN) (bronze) Liu Qiohong (CHN)
    - 3000 m Relay: (gold) China (silver) United States (bronze) Canada

==== Speed skating ====
- World Cup 1 in Berlin, Germany:
  - 500 m women (2): (gold) Jenny Wolf (GER) 37.52 (silver) Wang Beixing (CHN) 37.94 (bronze) Annette Gerritsen (NED) 38.27
    - Standing after 2 of 12 races: Wolf, Wang 180 points, Gerritsen 130
  - 500 m men (2): (gold) Tucker Fredricks (USA) 35.06 (silver) Lee Kang-seok (KOR) 35.10 (bronze) Lee Kyou-hyuk (KOR) 35.10
    - Standing after 2 of 12 races: Lee Kang-seok 180 points, Lee Kyou-hyuk 150, Fredricks 116
  - 1500 m women: (gold) Christine Nesbitt (CAN) 1:55.54 (silver) Martina Sáblíková (CZE) 1:56.99 (bronze) Brittany Schussler (CAN) 1:57.26
  - 1500 m men: (gold) Shani Davis (USA) 1:44.47 (silver) Håvard Bøkko (NOR) 1:45.56 (bronze) Denny Morrison (CAN) 1:45.69

==== Tennis ====
- ATP World Tour:
  - Valencia Open 500 in Valencia, Spain:
    - Final: **Andy Murray** (GBR) def. Mikhail Youzhny (RUS) 6–3, 6–2
      - Murray wins his sixth title of the year and 14th of his career in his first tournament back from a wrist injury.
  - Davidoff Swiss Indoors in Basel, Switzerland:
    - Final: **Novak Djokovic** (SRB) def. Roger Federer (SUI) 6–4, 4–6, 6–2
      - Djokovic wins his fourth title of the year and 15th of his career, and denies Federer a fourth consecutive win at his hometown tournament.
- WTA Tour:
  - Commonwealth Bank Tournament of Champions in Bali, Indonesia:
    - Final: **Aravane Rezaï** (FRA) def. Marion Bartoli (FRA) 7–5 (ret.)
      - Rezaï wins her second tournament of the year and her career when top seed Bartoli is forced to retire with a quadriceps injury.
- Fed Cup:
  - Fed Cup Final in Reggio Calabria, day 2:
    - **Italy** 4–0 United States
      - Flavia Pennetta (ITA) def. Melanie Oudin (USA) 7–5, 6–2
      - Francesca Schiavone (ITA) vs. Alexa Glatch (USA) not played
      - Sara Errani/Roberta Vinci (ITA) def. Liezel Huber/Vania King (USA) 4–6, 6–3, 11–9
        - Italy beat the US for the first time in 10 meetings, and win the Fed Cup for the second time.

==== Volleyball ====
- Men's Club World Championship in Doha, Qatar:
  - 3rd place: (bronze) **Zenit Kazan** (Russia) 3–0 (Iran) Paykan Tehran
  - Final: (silver) PGE Skra Bełchatów (Poland) 0–3 (gold) (Italy) **Trentino BetClic**
    - Trentino BetClic becomes the fifth consecutive Italian title winner.

=== November 7, 2009 (Saturday) ===
==== American football ====
- NCAA:
  - BCS Top 10 (unbeaten teams in **bold**):
    - (1) **Florida** 27, Vanderbilt 3
    - (2) **Texas** 35, UCF 3
    - (3) **Alabama** 24, (9) LSU 15
      - The Tide book their place in the SEC Championship Game against Florida.
    - Northwestern 17, (4) Iowa 10
      - Iowa quarterback Ricky Stanzi is knocked out of the game with an apparent ankle injury on a play that gives the Wildcats their first touchdown, and the Hawkeyes' unbeaten season and national title hopes go down with him.
    - (5) **Cincinnati** 47, Connecticut 45
    - (6) **TCU** 55, San Diego State 12
    - Stanford 51, (8) Oregon 42
    - (10) Georgia Tech 30, Wake Forest 27 (OT)
    - Played earlier this week: (7) **Boise State**
  - Other games:
    - (16) Ohio State 24, (11) Penn State 7
    - Oregon State 31, (20) California 14
    - Navy 23, (22) Notre Dame 21
      - The Midshipmen win consecutive games in South Bend for the first time since 1961 and 1963.
    - Nebraska 10, (24) Oklahoma 3

==== Auto racing ====
- Nationwide Series:
  - O'Reilly Challenge in Fort Worth, Texas:
    - (1) Kyle Busch (Nevada) (Toyota, Joe Gibbs Racing) (2) Casey Mears (California) (Chevrolet, Richard Childress Racing) (3) Jason Leffler (California) (Toyota, Braun Racing)
      - Standings (with 2 races remaining): (1) Busch 5374 points (2) Carl Edwards (Missouri) (Ford, Roush Fenway Racing) 5102 (3) Brad Keselowski (Michigan) (Chevrolet, JR Motorsports) 5082
- V8 Supercars:
  - The Island 300 in Phillip Island, Victoria:
    - Race 21: (1) Jamie Whincup (AUS) (Ford Falcon) (2) Will Davison (AUS) (Holden Commodore) (3) Rick Kelly (AUS) (Holden Commodore)
      - Drivers' standings (after 21 of 26 races): (1) Whincup 2754 points (2) Davison 2710 (3) Garth Tander (AUS) (Holden Commodore) 2435

==== Baseball ====
- Nippon Professional Baseball postseason:
  - Japan Series:
    - Game 6, Yomiuri Giants 2, Hokkaido Nippon-Ham Fighters 0. **Giants win best-of-7 series 4–2.**
      - The Giants win the Series for a record 21st time.

==== Canadian football ====
- CIS football championships (CIS Top Ten rankings in parentheses):
  - Hardy Cup Canada West semifinals:
    - (2) Calgary Dinos 45, Alberta Golden Bears 13
    - (3) Saskatchewan Huskies 53, Regina Rams 23
  - Yates Cup OUA semifinals:
    - (4) Queen's Golden Gaels 32, (9) McMaster Marauders 6
    - (5) Western Ontario Mustangs 26, (7) Wilfrid Laurier Golden Hawks 16
  - Dunsmore Cup QUFL semifinals:
    - (1) Laval Rouge-et-Or 63, Concordia Stingers 1
    - (8) Montreal Carabins 40, Bishop's Gaiters 15
  - Loney Bowl AUS semifinal:
    - (10) St. Francis Xavier X-Men 33, Acadia Axemen 30

==== Figure skating ====
- ISU Grand Prix:
  - NHK Trophy in Nagano, Japan: (skaters in **bold** qualify for the Grand Prix Final)
    - Ice Dance – standings after Original Dance: (1) Meryl Davis/Charlie White (USA) 101.18 (2) Sinead Kerr/John Kerr (GBR) 91.57 (3) Vanessa Crone/Paul Poirier (CAN) 81.38
    - Pairs: (gold) **Pang Qing/Tong Jian** (CHN) 199.65 (silver) Yuko Kavaguti/Alexander Smirnov (RUS) 193.05 (bronze) Rena Inoue/John Baldwin (USA) 158.78
      - Standings after 4 of 6 events: Pang/Tong 30 points, Kavaguti/Smirnov 26, Inoue/Baldwin 20.
    - Men: (gold) **Brian Joubert** (FRA) 232.70 (silver) Johnny Weir (USA) 217.70 (bronze) Michal Březina (CZE) 217.48
      - Standings: **Nobunari Oda** (JPN) 30 points, Joubert 24, Weir 22.
    - Ladies: (gold) **Miki Ando** (JPN) 162.55 (silver) Alena Leonova (RUS) 160.85 (bronze) Ashley Wagner (USA) 155.99
      - Standings: Ando 30 points, Leonova, Wagner 24.

==== Football (soccer) ====
- CAF Champions League finals, second leg: (first leg score in parentheses)
  - **TP Mazembe** (Democratic Republic of the Congo) 1–0 (1–2) (Nigeria) Heartland. Aggregate 2–2, TP Mazembe win on away goals.
    - TP Mazembe win the title for the third time, and qualify for FIFA Club World Cup.
- AFC Champions League Final in Tokyo:
  - Al-Ittihad (Saudi Arabia) 1–2 (South Korea) **Pohang Steelers**
    - Pohang Steelers win the title for the third time, and qualify for FIFA Club World Cup.
- (United States) MLS Cup Playoffs:
  - Eastern Conference semifinals, second leg: (first leg score in parentheses)
    - Chicago Fire 2 (1), New England Revolution 0 (2). Chicago Fire win 3–2 on aggregate.
      - The Fire will play against Real Salt Lake at home in the Conference Final on November 14.
- (Sweden) Swedish Cup Final in Solna:
  - AIK 2–0 IFK Göteborg
    - AIK win the Cup for the eighth time and complete a league-cup double.

==== Horse racing ====
- Breeders' Cup in Arcadia, California, Day 2:
  - Juvenile Turf:
    - Winner: Pounced (jockey Frankie Dettori, trainer John Gosden)
  - Turf Sprint:
    - Winner: California Flag (jockey Joe Talamo, trainer Brian Koriner)
  - Sprint:
    - Winner: Dancing in Silks (jockey Joel Rosario, trainer Carla Gaines)
      - The 25–1 shot wins in a four-horse photo finish.
  - Juvenile:
    - Winner: Vale of York (jockey Ahmed Ajtabi, trainer Saeed bin Suroor)
  - Mile:
    - Winner: Goldikova (jockey Olivier Peslier, trainer Freddy Head)
      - Goldikova becomes the fourth horse to win the Mile twice. Head, already the first person to both ride and train winners of a Breeders' Cup race, becomes the first person to score consecutive wins in both roles.
  - Dirt Mile:
    - Winner: Furthest Land (jockey Julien Leparoux, trainer Michael J. Maker)
  - Turf:
    - Winner: Conduit (jockey Ryan Moore, trainer Michael Stoute)
      - Conduit becomes the second horse to successfully defend a Breeders' Cup title this year.
  - Classic:
    - Winner: Zenyatta (jockey Mike Smith, trainer John Shirreffs)
      - The unbeaten Zenyatta becomes the first filly or mare to win the Classic, and the first horse ever to win two different Breeders' Cup races.

==== Rugby league ====
- Four Nations: (teams in **bold** advance to the Final)
  - Round 3:
    - **England** 20–12 New Zealand
    - France 4–42 **Australia**
      - Final standings: Australia 5 points, England 4, New Zealand 3, France 0.

==== Rugby union ====
- End of year tests:
  - Week 2:
    - England 9–18 Australia in London
    - Portugal 9–12 Namibia in Lisbon
    - Wales 12–19 New Zealand in Cardiff
- Air New Zealand Cup Final in Christchurch:
  - **Canterbury** 28–20 Wellington
    - Canterbury win what is intended to be the final Air New Zealand Cup before the reorganisation of New Zealand domestic rugby in 2010.

==== Short track speed skating ====
- World Cup in Montreal, Canada:
  - Men:
    - 1500 m: (gold) Charles Hamelin (CAN) (silver) Sung Si-Bak (KOR) (bronze) Travis Jayner (USA)
    - 500 m: (gold) Charles Hamelin (CAN) (silver) Apolo Anton Ohno (USA) (bronze) Jeff Simon (USA)
  - Women:
    - 1500 m: (gold) Katherine Reutter (USA) (silver) Cho Ha-Ri (KOR) (bronze) Liu Qiohong (CHN)
    - 500 m: (gold) Wang Meng (CHN) (silver) Kalyna Roberge (CAN) (bronze) Zhao Nannan (CHN)

==== Speed skating ====
- World Cup 1 in Berlin, Germany:
  - 500 m women (1): (gold) Wang Beixing (CHN) 37.85 (silver) Jenny Wolf (GER) 38.04 (bronze) Nao Kodaira (JPN) 38.19|-
  - 5000 m men: (gold) Sven Kramer (NED) 6:14.69 (silver) Håvard Bøkko (NOR) 6:17.17 (bronze) Bob de Jong (NED) 6:19.22
  - 1000 m women (1): (gold) Christine Nesbitt (CAN) 1:15.41 (silver) Nao Kodaira (JPN) 1:15.92 (bronze) Marianne Timmer (NED) 1:16.13

==== Tennis ====
- Fed Cup:
  - Fed Cup Final in Reggio Calabria, day 1:
    - Italy 2–0 United States
      - Flavia Pennetta (ITA) def. Alexa Glatch (USA) 6–3, 6–1
      - Francesca Schiavone (ITA) def. Melanie Oudin (USA) 7–6(2), 6–2

==== Volleyball ====
- Men's Club World Championship in Doha, Qatar:
  - Semifinals:
    - PGE Skra Bełchatów (Poland) 3–1 (Russia) Zenit Kazan
    - Trentino BetClic (Italy) 3–0 (Iran) Paykan Tehran

=== November 6, 2009 (Friday) ===
==== American football ====
- NCAA BCS Top 10 (unbeaten team in **bold**):
  - (7) **Boise State** 45, Louisiana Tech 35

==== Cricket ====
- Pakistan v New Zealand in UAE:
  - 2nd ODI in Abu Dhabi:
    - New Zealand 303/8 (50 ov, Brendon McCullum 131); Pakistan 239 (47.2 ov). **New Zealand win by 64 runs. 3-match series level 1–1**.

==== Figure skating ====
- ISU Grand Prix:
  - NHK Trophy in Nagano, Japan:
    - Ice Dance – Compulsory Dance: (1) Meryl Davis/Charlie White (USA) 38.09 (2) Sinead Kerr/John Kerr (GBR) 35.04 (3) Ekaterina Bobrova/Dmitri Soloviev (RUS) 31.72
    - Pairs – Short Program: (1) Yuko Kavaguti/Alexander Smirnov (RUS) 68.90 (2) Pang Qing/Tong Jian (CHN) 67.30 (3) Caydee Denney/Jeremy Barrett (USA) 55.20
    - Men – Short Program: (1) Brian Joubert (FRA) 85.35 (2) Jeremy Abbott (USA) 83.00 (3) Johnny Weir (USA) 78.35
    - Ladies – Short Program: (1) Ashley Wagner (USA) 56.54 (2) Miki Ando (JPN) 56.22 (3) Yukari Nakano (JPN) 54.92

==== Horse racing ====
- Breeders' Cup in Arcadia, California, Day 1:
  - Marathon:
    - Winner: Man of Iron (jockey Johnny Murtagh, trainer Aidan O'Brien)
  - Juvenile Fillies Turf:
    - Winner: Tapitsfly (jockey Robby Albarado, trainer Dale Romans)
  - Juvenile Fillies:
    - Winner: She Be Wild (jockey Julien Leparoux, trainer Wayne Catalano)
  - Filly & Mare Turf:
    - Winner: Midday (jockey Thomas Queally, trainer Henry Cecil)
  - Filly & Mare Sprint:
    - Winner: Informed Decision (jockey Julien Leparoux, trainer Jonathan Sheppard)
  - Ladies' Classic:
    - Winner: Life Is Sweet (jockey: Garrett K. Gomez, trainer: John Shirreffs)

==== Rugby union ====
- End of year tests:
  - Week 2:
    - Leicester Tigers (England) 22–17 South Africa in Leicester

==== Speed skating ====
- World Cup 1 in Berlin, Germany:
  - 500 m men (1): (gold) Lee Kang-seok (KOR) 34.80 (silver) Lee Kyou-hyuk (KOR) 35.02 (bronze) Keiichiro Nagashima (JPN) 35.13
  - 3000 m women: (gold) Martina Sáblíková (CZE) 4:00.75 (silver) Masako Hozumi (JPN) 4:06.25 (bronze) Stephanie Beckert (GER) 4:07.17
  - 1000 m men (1): (gold) Shani Davis (USA) 1:08.53 (silver) Yevgeny Lalenkov (RUS) 1:09.11 (bronze) Mun Jun (KOR) 1:09.43

=== November 5, 2009 (Thursday) ===
==== Baseball ====
- Nippon Professional Baseball postseason:
  - Japan Series:
    - Game 5: Yomiuri Giants 3, Hokkaido Nippon-Ham Fighters 2. **Giants lead best-of-7 series 3–2.**
      - Shinji Takahashi's homer in the top of the 9th inning gives the Fighters the lead, but the Giants tie the game with a solo homer by Yoshiyuki Kamei and then Shinnosuke Abe ends it with a walk-off home run.

==== Basketball ====
- Euroleague:
  - Regular Season Game 3: (unbeaten teams in **bold**)
    - Group A:
      - Žalgiris (Lithuania) 70–77 (Spain) **Regal FC Barcelona**
    - Group B:
      - Partizan (Serbia) 78–71 (France) Orléans
      - **Unicaja Málaga** (Spain) 93–88 (Turkey) Efes Pilsen
    - Group C:
      - Maccabi Tel Aviv (Israel) 71–54 (Russia) CSKA Moscow
      - Union Olimpija Ljubljana (Slovenia) 76–82 (Spain) Caja Laboral Baskonia
    - Group D:
      - Real Madrid (Spain) 80–70 (Greece) Panathinaikos Athens

==== Cricket ====
- Australia in India:
  - 5th ODI in Hyderabad:
    - Australia 350/4 (50 ov, Shaun Marsh 112); India 347 (49.4 ov, Sachin Tendulkar 175). **Australia win by 3 runs, lead the 7-match series 3–2**.
- Zimbabwe in Bangladesh:
  - 5th ODI in Chittagong:
    - Zimbabwe 221/9 (50 ov, Brendan Taylor 118 *); Bangladesh 222/9 (49 ov). **Bangladesh win by 1 wicket, win the 5-match series 4–1**.

==== Football (soccer) ====
- U-17 World Cup in Nigeria:
  - Round of 16:
    - **Spain** 4–1 Burkina Faso
    - Iran 1–2 (ET) **Uruguay**
    - Mexico 1–1 (3–5 pen.) (South Korea) **Korea Republic**
    - **Nigeria** 5–0 New Zealand
- UEFA Europa League group stage, Matchday 4: (teams in **bold** advance to the round of 32)
  - Group A:
    - **Anderlecht** (Belgium) 3–1 (Romania) Timişoara
    - Dinamo Zagreb (Croatia) 0–2 (Netherlands) Ajax
      - Standings: Ajax, Anderlecht 8 points, Timişoara 2, Dinamo Zagreb 0.
  - Group B:
    - Slavia Prague (Czech Republic) 2–2 (Spain) Valencia
    - Genoa (Italy) 3–2 (France) Lille
      - Standings: Lille 7, Valencia, Genoa 6, Slavia Prague 2.
  - Group C:
    - Hamburg (Germany) 0–0 (Scotland) Celtic
    - Rapid Wien (Austria) 0–3 (Israel) Hapoel Tel Aviv
      - Standings: Hapoel Tel Aviv 9 points, Hamburg 7, Rapid Wien 4, Celtic 2.
  - Group D:
    - Sporting CP (Portugal) 1–1 (Latvia) Ventspils
    - Heerenveen (Netherlands) 2–3 (Germany) Hertha BSC
      - Standings: Sporting CP 10 points, Hertha BSC, Heerenveen 4, Ventspils 3.
  - Group E:
    - Roma (Italy) 2–1 (England) Fulham
    - Basel (Switzerland) 3–1 (Bulgaria) CSKA Sofia
      - Standings: Basel 9, Roma 7, Fulham 5, CSKA Sofia 1.
  - Group F:
    - Dinamo București (Romania) 0–3 (Turkey) **Galatasaray**
    - Sturm Graz (Austria) 0–1 (Greece) Panathinaikos
      - Standings: Galatasaray 10 points, Panathinaikos 9, Dinamo București 3, Sturm Graz 1.
  - Group G:
    - Levski Sofia (Bulgaria) 0–1 (Austria) Red Bull Salzburg
    - Villarreal (Spain) 4–1 (Italy) Lazio
      - Standings: Red Bull Salzburg 12 points, Villarreal, Lazio 6, Levski Sofia 0.
  - Group H:
    - Twente (Netherlands) 2–1 (Moldova) Sheriff Tiraspol
    - Fenerbahçe (Turkey) 3–1 (Romania) Steaua București
      - Standings: Fenerbahçe 9 points, Twente 7, Sheriff Tiraspol 4, Steaua București 2.
  - Group I:
    - AEK Athens (Greece) 2–2 (Belarus) BATE Borisov
    - Everton (England) 0–2 (Portugal) Benfica
      - Standings: Benfica 9 points, Everton 6, BATE, AEK Athens 4.
  - Group J:
    - Toulouse (France) 0–2 (Ukraine) **Shakhtar Donetsk**
    - Partizan (Serbia) 2–4 (Belgium) Club Brugge
      - Standings: Shakhtar Donetsk 12 points, Club Brugge 7, Toulouse 4, Partizan 0.
  - Group K:
    - Copenhagen (Denmark) 1–1 (Netherlands) PSV Eindhoven
    - CFR Cluj (Romania) 2–3 (Czech Republic) Sparta Prague
      - Standings: PSV Eindhoven 8 points, Sparta Prague 7, Copenhagen 4, CFR Cluj 3.
  - Group L:
    - **Werder Bremen** (Germany) 2–0 Austria Wien
    - Nacional (Portugal) 1–1 (Spain) Athletic Bilbao
      - Standings: Werder Bremen 10 points, Athletic Bilbao 7, Nacional, Austria Wien 2.
- UEFA Women's Champions League Round of 16, first leg:
  - Fortuna Hjørring (Denmark) 0–1 (France) Lyon
- Copa Sudamericana Quarterfinals, second leg: (first leg score in parentheses)
  - Universidad de Chile 0–1 (2–2) (Brazil) **Fluminense**. Fluminense win 3–2 on aggregate.
  - **LDU Quito** (Ecuador) 2–1 (1–1) (Argentina) Vélez Sarsfield. LDU Quito win 3–2 on aggregate.
- (United States) MLS Cup Playoffs:
  - Eastern Conference semifinals, second leg: (first leg score in parentheses)
    - **Real Salt Lake** 3 (1), Columbus Crew 2 (0). Real Salt Lake win 4–2 on aggregate.

==== Snooker ====
- Premier League Snooker – League phase in Exeter, Devon
  - Marco Fu (HKG) 2–4 Neil Robertson (AUS)
  - Ronnie O'Sullivan (ENG) 2–4 Judd Trump (ENG)
    - Standings: John Higgins, Trump 6 points (4 games), O'Sullivan 6 (5), Stephen Hendry, Robertson 5 (5), Shaun Murphy 3 (4), Fu 1 (5).

==== Volleyball ====
- Men's Club World Championship in Doha, Qatar: (teams in **bold** advance to the semifinals)
  - Pool A:
    - **Zenit Kazan** (Russia) 3–0 (Egypt) Zamalek
    - Plataneros de Corozal (Puerto Rico) 0–3 (Italy) **Trentino BetClic**
      - Final standings: Trentino BetClic 6 points, Zenit Kazan 5, Zamalek 4, Plataneros de Corozal 3.
  - Pool B:
    - **Paykan Tehran** (Iran) 3–0 (Qatar) Al-Arabi
    - Cimed (Brazil) 1–3 (Poland) **PGE Skra Bełchatów**
      - Final standings: PGE Skra Bełchatów 6 points, Paykan Tehran 5, Cimed 4, Al-Arabi 3.

=== November 4, 2009 (Wednesday) ===
==== Baseball ====
- Major League Baseball postseason:
  - World Series:
    - Game 6, New York Yankees 7, Philadelphia Phillies 3. **Yankees win series 4–2.**
      - The Yankees win their 27th World Series and their first since 2000. Hideki Matsui is named World Series MVP.
- Nippon Professional Baseball postseason:
  - Japan Series:
    - Game 4, Hokkaido Nippon-Ham Fighters 8, Yomiuri Giants 4. **Series tied 2–2.**

==== Basketball ====
- Euroleague:
  - Regular Season Game 3: (unbeaten teams in **bold**)
    - Group A:
      - ASVEL Villeurbanne (France) 65–82 (Italy) **Montepaschi Siena**
      - Fenerbahçe Ülker (Turkey) 67–62 (Croatia) Cibona
    - Group B:
      - Olympiacos (Greece) 97–73 (Lithuania) Lietuvos Rytas
    - Group C:
      - Maroussi Athens (Greece) 71–83 (Italy) **Lottomatica Roma**
    - Group D:
      - Asseco Prokom Gdynia (Poland) 88–83 (Italy) Armani Jeans Milano
      - Khimki Moscow Region (Russia) 77–72 (Germany) EWE Baskets Oldenburg

==== Football (soccer) ====
- U-17 World Cup in Nigeria:
  - Round of 16:
    - Argentina 2–3 **Colombia**
    - **Turkey** 2–0 United Arab Emirates
    - **Switzerland** 4–3 (ET) Germany
    - **Italy** 2–1 United States
- UEFA Champions League group stage, Matchday 4: (teams in **bold** advance to the round of 16)
  - Group E:
    - Fiorentina (Italy) 5–2 (Hungary) Debrecen
    - **Lyon** (France) 1–1 (England) Liverpool
      - Standings: Lyon 10 points, Fiorentina 9, Liverpool 4, Debrecen 0.
  - Group F:
    - Rubin Kazan (Russia) 0–0 (Spain) Barcelona
    - Dynamo Kyiv (Ukraine) 1–2 (Italy) Internazionale
      - Standings: Inter 6 points, Rubin Kazan, Barcelona 5, Dynamo Kyiv 4.
  - Group G:
    - Unirea Urziceni (Romania) 1–1 (Scotland) Rangers in progress
    - **Sevilla** (Spain) 1–1 (Germany) Stuttgart in progress
      - Standings: Sevilla 10 points, Unirea Urziceni 5, Stuttgart 3, Rangers 2.
  - Group H:
    - Arsenal (England) 4–1 (Netherlands) AZ
    - Standard Liège (Belgium) 2–0 (Greece) Olympiacos
      - Standings: Arsenal 10 points, Olympiacos 6, Standard Liège 4, AZ 2.
- UEFA Women's Champions League Round of 16, first leg:
  - Røa (Norway) 0–0 (Russia) Zvezda 2005 Perm
  - Rossiyanka (Russia) 0–1 (Sweden) Umeå
  - Sparta Praha (Czech Republic) 0–3 (England) Arsenal
  - Montpellier (France) 0–0 (Germany) Bayern Munich
  - Turbine Potsdam (Germany) 1–0 (Denmark) Brøndby
  - Neulengbach (Austria) 1–4 (Italy) Torres
  - Duisburg (Germany) 1–1 (Sweden) Linköping
- Copa Sudamericana Quarterfinals, second leg: (first leg score in parentheses)
  - San Lorenzo (Argentina) 0–1 (1–0) (Uruguay) **River Plate**. 1–1 on aggregate, River Plate win 7–6 on penalties.
  - Botafogo (Brazil) 1–3 (1–2) (Paraguay) **Cerro Porteño**. Cerro Porteño win 5–2 on aggregate.

==== Volleyball ====
- Men's Club World Championship in Doha, Qatar: (teams in **bold** advance to the semifinals)
  - Pool A:
    - Zamalek (Egypt) 3–2 (Puerto Rico) Plataneros de Corozal
    - **Trentino BetClic** (Italy) 3–2 (Russia) Zenit Kazan
      - Standings: Trentino BetClic 4 points, Zenit Kazan, Zamalek 3, Plataneros de Corozal 2.
  - Pool B:
    - Al-Arabi (Qatar) 1–3 (Brazil) Cimed
    - **PGE Skra Bełchatów** (Poland) 3–0 (Iran) Paykan Tehran
      - Standings: PGE Skra Bełchatów 4 points, Cimed, Paykan Tehran 3, Al-Arabi 2.

=== November 3, 2009 (Tuesday) ===
==== Baseball ====
- Nippon Professional Baseball postseason:
  - Japan Series:
    - Game 3, Yomiuri Giants 7, Hokkaido Nippon-Ham Fighters 4. **Giants lead best-of-7 series 2–1.**

==== Canadian football ====
- CIS football:
  - The Canada West Universities Athletic Association overturns the results of three Manitoba Bisons victories due to ineligible players. As a result of this decision, the Bisons will drop out of the playoffs, and be replaced by the Regina Rams.

==== Cricket ====
- Zimbabwe in Bangladesh:
  - 4th ODI in Chittagong:
    - Zimbabwe 44 (24.5 ov); Bangladesh 49/4 (11.5 ov). **Bangladesh win by 6 wickets, lead the 5-match series 3–1**.
      - Zimbabwe's 44 is the 5th lowest score in One-day internationals. Only 3 players in both teams managed to score in double-figures.
- Pakistan v New Zealand in UAE:
  - 1st ODI in Abu Dhabi:
    - Pakistan 287/9 (50 ov); New Zealand 149 (39.2 ov). **Pakistan win by 138 runs, lead the 3-match series 1–0**.

==== Football (soccer) ====
- UEFA Champions League group stage, Matchday 4: (teams in **bold** advance to the round of 16)
  - Group A:
    - Bayern Munich (Germany) 0–2 (France) **Bordeaux**
    - Maccabi Haifa (Israel) 0–1 (Italy) Juventus
      - Standings: Bordeaux 10 points, Juventus 8, Bayern Munich 4, Maccabi Haifa 0.
  - Group B:
    - **Manchester United** (England) 3–3 (Russia) CSKA Moscow
    - Beşiktaş (Turkey) 0–3 (Germany) Wolfsburg
      - Standings: Manchester United 10 points, Wolfsburg 7, CSKA Moscow 4, Beşiktaş 1.
  - Group C:
    - Milan (Italy) 1–1 (Spain) Real Madrid
    - Marseille (France) 6–1 (Switzerland) Zürich
      - Standings: Milan, Real Madrid 7 points, Marseille 6, Zürich 3.
  - Group D:
    - APOEL (Cyprus) 0–1 (Portugal) **Porto**
    - Atlético Madrid (Spain) 2–2 (England) **Chelsea**
      - Standings: Chelsea 10 points, Porto 9, Atlético Madrid 2, APOEL 1.
- AFC Cup Final in Kuwait City:
  - **Al-Kuwait** 2–1 (ET) (Syria) Al-Karamah

==== Horse racing ====
- Melbourne Cup in Melbourne:
  - Winner: Shocking (jockey: Corey Brown; trainer: Mark Kavanagh)

==== Rugby union ====
- End of year tests:
  - Week 2:
    - Gloucester (England) 5–36 Australia in Gloucester

==== Volleyball ====
- Men's Club World Championship in Doha, Qatar:
  - Pool A:
    - Trentino BetClic (Italy) 3–1 (Egypt) Zamalek
    - Zenit Kazan (Russia) 3–0 (Puerto Rico) Plataneros de Corozal
  - Pool B:
    - PGE Skra Bełchatów (Poland) 3–0 (Qatar) Al-Arabi
    - Paykan Tehran (Iran) 3–1 (Brazil) Cimed

=== November 2, 2009 (Monday) ===
==== American football ====
- NFL Monday Night Football Week 8 (unbeaten team in **bold**):
  - **New Orleans Saints** 35, Atlanta Falcons 27

==== Baseball ====
- Major League Baseball postseason:
  - World Series:
    - Game 5: Philadelphia Phillies 8, New York Yankees 6. **Yankees lead best-of-7 series 3–2.**
      - The Phillies' Chase Utley hits two home runs, and ties Reggie Jackson's 1977 record of five homers in a Series.

==== Cricket ====
- Australia in India:
  - 4th ODI in Mohali:
    - Australia 250 (49.2 ov); India 226 (46.4 ov). **Australia win by 24 runs. 7-match series level 2–2.**

=== November 1, 2009 (Sunday) ===
==== American football ====
- NFL Week 8 (unbeaten team in **bold**):
  - Houston Texans 31, Buffalo Bills 10
  - Chicago Bears 30, Cleveland Browns 6
  - Dallas Cowboys 38, Seattle Seahawks 17
  - St. Louis Rams 17, Detroit Lions 10
    - Steven Jackson runs 25 yards for a touchdown with 1:38 remaining to end the Rams' 17-game losing streak.
  - Baltimore Ravens 30, Denver Broncos 17
    - The Ravens hand the Broncos their first defeat of the season.
  - **Indianapolis Colts** 18, San Francisco 49ers 14
    - The Colts rally from 14–6 down late in the second quarter for their 16th straight regular-season win.
  - Miami Dolphins 30, New York Jets 25
    - The Dolphins' Ted Ginn Jr. becomes the first player in NFL history with two TD returns of 100 yards or more in the same game, and the first player since 1967 to score two TD returns in the same quarter.
  - Philadelphia Eagles 40, New York Giants 17
  - Tennessee Titans 30, Jacksonville Jaguars 13
    - The Titans end their winning drought as Chris Johnson and Maurice Jones-Drew each have two touchdown runs of more than 50 yards, making this the first game in NFL history with four such runs.
  - San Diego Chargers 24, Oakland Raiders 16
  - Carolina Panthers 34, Arizona Cardinals 21
  - Minnesota Vikings 38, Green Bay Packers 26
    - Brett Favre passes for 244 yards and four touchdowns in his first regular-season appearance at Lambeau Field in an opposing uniform since he left the Packers after the 2007 season.
  - Bye week: Cincinnati Bengals, Kansas City Chiefs, New England Patriots, Pittsburgh Steelers, Tampa Bay Buccaneers, Washington Redskins

==== Athletics ====
- New York City Marathon:
  - Men: (gold) Meb Keflezighi (USA) 2:09:15 (silver) Robert Kipkoech Cheruiyot (KEN) 2:09:56 (bronze) Jaouad Gharib (MAR) 2:10:25
    - Keflezighi becomes the USA's first men's winner since Alberto Salazar in 1982.
  - Women: (gold) Derartu Tulu (ETH) 2:28:52 (silver) Lyudmila Petrova (RUS) 2:29:00 (bronze) Christelle Daunay (FRA) 2:29:16
    - Tulu becomes the first Ethiopian female winner.

==== Auto racing ====
- Formula One:
  - Abu Dhabi Grand Prix in Yas Island:
    - (1) Sebastian Vettel (GER) (Red Bull–Renault) 1:34:03.314 (2) Mark Webber (AUS) (Red Bull-Renault) +17.857 (3) Jenson Button (GBR) (Brawn–Mercedes) +18.467
      - Final Drivers' Championship standings: (1) Button 95 points (2) Vettel 84 (3) Rubens Barrichello (BRA) (Brawn-Mercedes) 77
      - Final Constructors' Championship standings: (1) Brawn-Mercedes 172 points (2) Red Bull-Renault 153.5 (3) McLaren-Mercedes 71
- Chase for the Sprint Cup:
  - AMP Energy 500 in Eastaboga, Alabama:
    - (1) Jamie McMurray (Missouri) (Ford, Roush Fenway Racing) (2) Kasey Kahne (Washington (state)) (Dodge, Richard Petty Motorsports) (3) Joey Logano (Connecticut) (Toyota, Joe Gibbs Racing)
    - Drivers' standings (with 3 races remaining): (1) Jimmie Johnson (California) (Chevrolet, Hendrick Motorsports) 6248 points (2) Mark Martin (Arkansas) (Chevrolet, Hendrick Motorsports) 6064 (−184) (3) Jeff Gordon (California) (Chevrolet, Hendrick Motorsports) 6056 (−192)

==== Badminton ====
- BWF Super Series:
  - French Super Series in Paris:
    - Mixed doubles final: Nova Widianto (INA)/Liliyana Natsir (INA) [2] def. Hendra Aprida Gunawan (INA)/Vita Marissa (INA) [7] 21–7 21–7
    - Women's singles final: Wang Yihan (CHN) [3] def. Wang Lin (CHN) [1] 21–9 21–12
    - Women's doubles final: Ma Jin (CHN)/Wang Xiaoli (CHN) [5] def. Cheng Shu (CHN)/Zhao Yunlei (CHN) [2] 21–13 21–8
    - Men's singles final: Lin Dan (CHN) [1] def. Taufik Hidayat (INA) [4] 21–6 21–15
    - Men's doubles final: Markis Kido (INA)/Hendra Setiawan (INA) [1] def. Koo Kien Keat (MAS)/Tan Boon Heong (MAS) [2] 15–21 21–15 21–14

==== Baseball ====
- Major League Baseball postseason:
  - World Series:
    - Game 4: New York Yankees 7, Philadelphia Phillies 4. **Yankees lead best-of-7 series 3–1.**
      - The Yankees' Alex Rodriguez, after becoming the second player in history to be hit by pitches three times in the same World Series, breaks a ninth-inning tie with an RBI double, and Mariano Rivera closes out the Phils in the bottom of the inning.
- Nippon Professional Baseball postseason:
  - Japan Series:
    - Game 2, Hokkaido Nippon-Ham Fighters 4, Yomiuri Giants 2. **Best-of-7 series tied 1–1.**

==== Football (soccer) ====
- U-17 World Cup in Nigeria: (teams in **bold** advance to the round of 16)
  - Group E:
    - Malawi 1–4 **Spain**
    - **United States** 1–0 **United Arab Emirates**
      - Final standings: Spain 9 points, USA 6, UAE 3, Malawi 0.
        - UAE advance to the round of 16 by virtue of a better fair-play record than Brazil and Netherlands.
  - Group F:
    - **Korea Republic** (South Korea) 2–0 Algeria
    - **Italy** 0–0 **Uruguay**
      - Final standings: Italy 7 points, Korea 6, Uruguay 4, Algeria 0.
- CAF Champions League finals, first leg:
  - Heartland (Nigeria) 2–1 (Democratic Republic of the Congo) TP Mazembe
- (Sweden) Allsvenskan, final matchday: (league standings in parentheses, team in **bold** qualify for the Champions League, teams in italics qualify for the Europa League)
  - (2) IFK Göteborg 1–2 (1) **AIK**
  - (3) Elfsborg 1–0 (7) Helsingborg
  - (14) Djurgården 2–0 (4) Kalmar
    - Final standings: AIK 61 points, IFK Göteborg 57, Elfsborg 55, Kalmar 50.
      - AIK win the championship for the 11th time in their history, and the first time since 1998, after beating IFK Göteborg in a deciding match, in which IFK needed a win to clinch the title. The two teams will meet again on November 7 in the Swedish Cup Final.
- (Norway) Norwegian Premier League, final matchday:
  - Final standings: **Rosenborg** 69 points, Molde 56, Stabæk 53.
    - Rosenborg win the championship for the 21st time, after a break of 3 years.
- (United States) MLS Cup Playoffs:
  - Conference semifinals, first leg:
    - New England Revolution 2, Chicago Fire 1
    - Los Angeles Galaxy 2, Chivas USA 2

==== Golf ====
- European Tour:
  - Volvo World Match Play Championship in Casares, Spain
    - Winner: Ross Fisher (ENG) def. Anthony Kim (USA) 4 & 3
- LPGA Tour:
  - Hana Bank-KOLON Championship in Incheon, South Korea
    - Winner: Na Yeon Choi (KOR) 206 (−10)
- Champions Tour:
  - Charles Schwab Cup Championship in Sonoma, California
    - Winner of tournament: John Cook (USA) 266 (−22)
    - Winner of Charles Schwab Cup (season points championship): Loren Roberts (USA)

==== Rugby league ====
- European Cup: (teams in **bold** advance to the final)
  - Group 1:
    - **Scotland** 22–10 Lebanon
      - Final standings: Scotland 4 points, Lebanon 2, Italy 0.
  - Group 2:
    - **Wales** 42–12 Ireland
      - Final standings: Wales 4 points, Ireland 2, Serbia 0.
- Pacific Cup:
  - Final in Port Moresby:
    - (silver) Cook Islands 14–42 (gold) Papua New Guinea
      - Papua New Guinea qualify for the 2010 Four Nations.

==== Tennis ====
- ATP World Tour:
  - St. Petersburg Open in Saint Petersburg, Russia:
    - Final: Sergiy Stakhovsky (UKR) def. Horacio Zeballos (ARG) 2–6, 7–6(8), 7–6(7)
      - Stakhovsky wins his first title of the year and second of his career.
  - Grand Prix de Tennis de Lyon in Lyon, France:
    - Final: Ivan Ljubičić (CRO) def. Michaël Llodra (FRA) 7–5, 6–3
      - Ljubičić wins his first title of the year and ninth of his career.
  - Bank Austria-TennisTrophy in Vienna, Austria:
    - Final: Jürgen Melzer (AUT) def. Marin Čilić (CRO) 6–3, 6–4
      - Melzer wins his first title of the year and second of his career.
- WTA Tour:
  - WTA Tour Championships in Doha, Qatar:
    - Final: Serena Williams (USA) def. Venus Williams (USA) 6–2, 7–6(4)
      - Serena Williams wins the WTA Tour Championships for the second time. This is her third title of the year and 35th of her career.
