= 2003 World Weightlifting Championships – Men's 105 kg =

The 2003 World Weightlifting Championships were held in Vancouver, Canada from 14 November to 22 November. The men's 105 kilograms division was staged on 20 and 21 November 2003.

== Schedule ==
Date	Time	Event
20 November 2003	11:00	Group D
20 November 2003	13:30	Group C
21 November 2003	15:00	Group B
21 November 2003	20:00	Group A

== Medalists ==
Event	Gold		Silver		Bronze	
Snatch	Vladimir Smorchkov (RUS)	195.0 kg	Said Saif Asaad (QAT)	195.0 kg	Denys Hotfrid (UKR)	192.5 kg
Clean & Jerk	Alan Tsagaev (BUL)	235.0 kg	Bünyamin Sudaş (TUR)	230.0 kg	Gleb Pisarevskiy (RUS)	227.5 kg
Total	Said Saif Asaad (QAT)	422.5 kg	Vladimir Smorchkov (RUS)	417.5 kg	Bünyamin Sudaş (TUR)	415.0 kg

== Records ==
Prior to this competition, the existing world records were as follows.

World Record	Snatch	Marcin Dołęga (POL)	198.5 kg	Havířov, Czech Republic	4 June 2002
World Record	Clean & Jerk	World Standard	242.5 kg	—	1 January 1998
World Record	Total	World Standard	440.0 kg	—	1 January 1998

== Results ==
Rank	Athlete	Group	Body weight	Snatch (kg)				Clean & Jerk (kg)				Total
Rank	Athlete	Group	Body weight	1	2	3	Rank	1	2	3	Rank	Total
1st place, gold medalist(s)	Said Saif Asaad (QAT)	A	104.92	190.0	195.0	~~197.5~~	2nd place, silver medalist(s)	~~225.0~~	227.5	~~230.0~~	4	422.5
2nd place, silver medalist(s)	Vladimir Smorchkov (RUS)	A	104.02	190.0	~~195.0~~	195.0	1st place, gold medalist(s)	~~222.5~~	222.5	~~225.0~~	5	417.5
3rd place, bronze medalist(s)	Bünyamin Sudaş (TUR)	A	102.96	180.0	185.0	~~190.0~~	7	225.0	230.0	~~232.5~~	2nd place, silver medalist(s)	415.0
4	Gleb Pisarevskiy (RUS)	A	103.62	~~182.5~~	182.5	~~190.0~~	10	222.5	227.5	~~235.0~~	3rd place, bronze medalist(s)	410.0
5	Marcin Dołęga (POL)	A	104.71	190.0	~~195.0~~	~~195.0~~	4	220.0	~~225.0~~	~~225.0~~	8	410.0
6	Ferenc Gyurkovics (HUN)	B	104.36	182.5	~~187.5~~	187.5	5	212.5	217.5	—	11	405.0
7	Matthias Steiner (AUT)	A	103.56	182.5	~~185.0~~	~~185.0~~	9	215.0	220.0	~~222.5~~	6	402.5
8	Boris Burov (ECU)	B	102.38	182.5	185.0	~~187.5~~	6	210.0	215.0	~~217.5~~	13	400.0
9	Aleksandr Urinov (UZB)	B	101.74	175.0	~~180.0~~	180.0	13	205.0	210.0	215.0	12	395.0
10	Andre Rohde (GER)	B	104.21	177.5	~~182.5~~	~~182.5~~	17	217.5	~~222.5~~	~~222.5~~	10	395.0
11	Moreno Boer (ITA)	C	104.69	175.0	~~180.0~~	~~180.0~~	20	210.0	215.0	220.0	7	395.0
12	Tomáš Matykiewicz (CZE)	C	103.42	~~170.0~~	170.0	175.0	19	210.0	~~215.0~~	217.5	9	392.5
13	Martin Tešovič (SVK)	B	99.32	175.0	~~180.0~~	180.0	11	210.0	~~215.0~~	~~215.0~~	14	390.0
14	Dmitriy Frolov (KAZ)	C	104.50	170.0	175.0	177.5	18	205.0	210.0	~~215.0~~	15	387.5
15	Mohsen Beiranvand (IRI)	C	100.57	170.0	175.0	180.0	12	~~205.0~~	205.0	~~212.5~~	18	385.0
16	Jörg Mazur (GER)	B	103.99	177.5	~~182.5~~	~~182.5~~	16	207.5	—	—	17	385.0
17	Peter Kelley (USA)	C	104.83	162.5	167.5	~~170.0~~	24	202.5	210.0	~~215.0~~	16	377.5
18	Akos Sandor (CAN)	D	104.34	165.0	~~170.0~~	170.0	22	200.0	205.0	~~210.0~~	20	375.0
19	Libor Wälzer (CZE)	C	104.76	162.5	167.5	~~170.0~~	23	200.0	~~205.0~~	205.0	21	372.5
20	Ahed Joughili (SYR)	C	103.03	~~160.0~~	162.5	~~167.5~~	26	202.5	~~212.5~~	~~212.5~~	22	365.0
21	Casey Burgener (USA)	D	104.13	~~160.0~~	160.0	165.0	25	190.0	~~197.5~~	200.0	23	365.0
22	William Solís (COL)	D	102.64	152.5	~~157.5~~	157.5	28	200.0	205.0	~~207.5~~	19	362.5
23	Miikka Huhtala (FIN)	C	104.79	162.5	~~167.5~~	~~167.5~~	27	~~190.0~~	~~190.0~~	192.5	25	355.0
24	Robertas Zenkevičius (LTU)	D	103.69	155.0	~~160.0~~	~~160.0~~	29	195.0	~~200.0~~	~~200.0~~	24	350.0
25	Omar Orfalli (SYR)	D	103.46	152.5	~~157.5~~	~~157.5~~	30	187.5	~~192.5~~	~~192.5~~	26	340.0
26	Rafal Korkowski (CAN)	D	104.33	~~147.5~~	147.5	~~155.0~~	31	170.0	180.0	~~185.0~~	27	327.5
—	Ammar Yosr (IRQ)	D	99.93	~~152.5~~	~~152.5~~	—	—	—	—	—	—	—
—	Janos Nemeshazy (SUI)	D	102.72	~~145.0~~	~~145.0~~	~~145.0~~	—	—	—	—	—	—
—	Robert Dołęga (POL)	A	103.59	180.0	185.0	~~187.5~~	8	~~225.0~~	~~225.0~~	~~225.0~~	—	—
—	Alan Tsagaev (BUL)	A	104.01	~~185.0~~	~~185.0~~	~~185.0~~	—	230.0	235.0	~~243.0~~	1st place, gold medalist(s)	—
—	Florin Vlad (ROM)	B	104.07	180.0	~~182.5~~	~~182.5~~	14	~~215.0~~	~~215.0~~	~~215.0~~	—	—
—	Rafik Chakhoyan (ARM)	B	104.22	172.5	~~177.5~~	~~177.5~~	21	~~207.5~~	~~207.5~~	~~207.5~~	—	—
—	Denys Hotfrid (UKR)	A	104.32	187.5	192.5	~~195.0~~	3rd place, bronze medalist(s)	—	—	—	—	—
—	Ramūnas Vyšniauskas (LTU)	B	104.55	180.0	~~185.0~~	~~185.0~~	15	~~220.0~~	~~220.0~~	~~220.0~~	—	—
—	Ihor Razoronov (UKR)	A	104.64	—	—	—	—	—	—	—	—	—
—	Khudair Sobhi (IRQ)	C	104.95	~~162.5~~	—	—	—	—	—	—	—	—
