= 2007 World Weightlifting Championships – Men's 105 kg =

The men's competition in 105 kg division was staged on September 24–25, 2007.

== Schedule ==
| Date | Time | Event |
|---|---|---|
| 24 September 2007 | 17:00 | Group C |
| 24 September 2007 | 20:00 | Group B |
| 25 September 2007 | 17:00 | Group A |

== Medalists ==
| Event | Gold | | Silver | | Bronze | |
|---|---|---|---|---|---|---|
| Snatch | Andrei Aramnau (BLR) | 195 kg | Bakhyt Akhmetov (KAZ) | 190 kg | Martin Tešovič (SVK) | 190 kg |
| Clean & Jerk | Alan Tsagaev (BUL) | 231 kg | Andrei Aramnau (BLR) | 228 kg | Nikolaos Kourtidis (GRE) | 226 kg |
| Total | Andrei Aramnau (BLR) | 423 kg | Alan Tsagaev (BUL) | 411 kg | Dmitry Klokov (RUS) | 411 kg |

== Records ==
Prior to this competition, the existing world records were as follows.

| World Record | Snatch | Marcin Dołęga (POL) | 199 kg | Władysławowo, Poland | 7 May 2006 |
| World Record | Clean & Jerk | World Standard | 242 kg | — | 1 January 1998 |
| World Record | Total | World Standard | 440 kg | — | 1 January 1998 |

== Results ==
| Rank | Athlete | Group | Body weight | Snatch (kg) | | | | Clean & Jerk (kg) | | | | Total |
| Rank | Athlete | Group | Body weight | 1 | 2 | 3 | Rank | 1 | 2 | 3 | Rank | Total |
|---|---|---|---|---|---|---|---|---|---|---|---|---|
| 1st place, gold medalist(s) | Andrei Aramnau (BLR) | A | 103.89 | 187 | 192 | 195 | 1st place, gold medalist(s) | 220 | 225 | 228 | 2nd place, silver medalist(s) | 423 |
| 2nd place, silver medalist(s) | Alan Tsagaev (BUL) | A | 104.73 | 175 | 180 | ~~183~~ | 6 | 217 | ~~226~~ | 231 | 1st place, gold medalist(s) | 411 |
| 3rd place, bronze medalist(s) | Dmitry Klokov (RUS) | A | 104.92 | 185 | ~~189~~ | 190 | 4 | 221 | ~~234~~ | ~~234~~ | 5 | 411 |
| 4 | Bakhyt Akhmetov (KAZ) | A | 104.25 | 180 | 185 | 190 | 2nd place, silver medalist(s) | 210 | 220 | ~~225~~ | 7 | 410 |
| 5 | Nikolaos Kourtidis (GRE) | A | 100.66 | ~~175~~ | 175 | 177 | 7 | 217 | 223 | 226 | 3rd place, bronze medalist(s) | 403 |
| 6 | Ramūnas Vyšniauskas (LTU) | A | 102.38 | ~~180~~ | 180 | ~~183~~ | 5 | 220 | ~~225~~ | ~~226~~ | 6 | 400 |
| 7 | Mikhail Audzeyeu (BLR) | A | 104.83 | 170 | 177 | ~~180~~ | 8 | 210 | 216 | ~~220~~ | 8 | 393 |
| 8 | Joel Mackenzie (CUB) | B | 103.99 | ~~170~~ | 170 | 176 | 9 | 206 | ~~215~~ | 215 | 10 | 391 |
| 9 | Ahed Joughili (SYR) | A | 104.82 | ~~171~~ | 171 | ~~176~~ | 15 | ~~216~~ | 216 | ~~223~~ | 9 | 389 |
| 10 | Bünyamin Sudaş (TUR) | B | 104.33 | 170 | ~~174~~ | ~~174~~ | 18 | 207 | 212 | 213 | 11 | 383 |
| 11 | Arkadiusz Białek (POL) | B | 104.47 | ~~167~~ | 167 | 172 | 14 | 200 | 211 | ~~220~~ | 12 | 383 |
| 12 | Jörg Mazur (GER) | B | 104.67 | 171 | ~~175~~ | 175 | 11 | 200 | ~~205~~ | 207 | 14 | 382 |
| 13 | Albert Kuzilov (GEO) | B | 103.98 | 167 | ~~173~~ | 173 | 13 | ~~208~~ | 208 | ~~220~~ | 13 | 381 |
| 14 | Mohsen Beiranvand (IRI) | B | 104.18 | 166 | 171 | 175 | 10 | ~~201~~ | 201 | ~~206~~ | 19 | 376 |
| 15 | Artur Babayan (ARM) | B | 104.04 | 165 | ~~170~~ | 170 | 17 | 205 | ~~212~~ | ~~212~~ | 16 | 375 |
| 16 | Abdelrahman El-Sayed (EGY) | B | 104.65 | ~~165~~ | 165 | 170 | 19 | 205 | ~~207~~ | ~~207~~ | 17 | 375 |
| 17 | Morteza Shahmohammadi (IRI) | B | 104.11 | 160 | ~~166~~ | 166 | 21 | 200 | 206 | ~~209~~ | 15 | 372 |
| 18 | Kim Hwa-seung (KOR) | B | 104.76 | 165 | ~~170~~ | ~~175~~ | 24 | 195 | 200 | 205 | 18 | 370 |
| 19 | Ibrahim Moursi (EGY) | B | 100.46 | 160 | 165 | 170 | 16 | 190 | 198 | ~~202~~ | 21 | 368 |
| 20 | Artem Ivanov (UKR) | B | 95.55 | 164 | ~~169~~ | 169 | 20 | 196 | ~~200~~ | ~~200~~ | 22 | 365 |
| 21 | Gia Machavariani (GEO) | B | 104.35 | 165 | ~~170~~ | ~~170~~ | 23 | 200 | ~~205~~ | ~~205~~ | 20 | 365 |
| 22 | Akos Sandor (CAN) | C | 104.87 | 150 | ~~155~~ | 155 | 27 | 190 | ~~195~~ | ~~195~~ | 25 | 345 |
| 23 | Wang Kuo-chen (TPE) | C | 104.80 | 141 | 150 | 155 | 26 | 180 | 188 | — | 26 | 343 |
| 24 | Moreno Boer (ITA) | C | 104.36 | 150 | 155 | ~~157~~ | 25 | 180 | 185 | ~~188~~ | 28 | 340 |
| 25 | Iļja Meņšikovs (LAT) | C | 103.77 | ~~147~~ | ~~147~~ | 150 | 30 | 183 | 186 | ~~190~~ | 27 | 336 |
| 26 | Niusila Opeloge (SAM) | C | 103.93 | ~~140~~ | 140 | 146 | 31 | 185 | 190 | ~~199~~ | 24 | 336 |
| 27 | Roman Russyanovskiy (KAZ) | C | 98.65 | 150 | 152 | 154 | 28 | ~~180~~ | 180 | ~~185~~ | 29 | 334 |
| 28 | Reynaldi Saenal (INA) | C | 104.53 | ~~140~~ | 140 | ~~145~~ | 34 | 185 | 188 | 191 | 23 | 331 |
| 29 | Gábor Vaspöri (HUN) | C | 101.57 | ~~145~~ | 145 | 150 | 29 | 180 | ~~185~~ | ~~185~~ | 30 | 330 |
| 30 | Luigi Grando (ITA) | C | 97.53 | 138 | 143 | ~~145~~ | 32 | 175 | ~~182~~ | ~~182~~ | 32 | 318 |
| 31 | Armando Gomes (ESP) | C | 94.29 | 140 | ~~145~~ | ~~145~~ | 33 | ~~170~~ | ~~175~~ | 175 | 31 | 315 |
| 32 | Nguyễn Thanh Hoàng (VIE) | C | 95.45 | 133 | ~~140~~ | ~~140~~ | 35 | 163 | 170 | ~~175~~ | 33 | 303 |
| 33 | Bidyut Kumar Roy (BAN) | C | 99.44 | 110 | 118 | 120 | 36 | 145 | 150 | ~~155~~ | 34 | 270 |
| — | Martin Tešovič (SVK) | A | 104.83 | 185 | 190 | ~~194~~ | 3rd place, bronze medalist(s) | ~~221~~ | ~~221~~ | ~~222~~ | — | — |
| — | Mohammed Jasim (IRQ) | A | 104.89 | ~~175~~ | 175 | ~~181~~ | 12 | ~~222~~ | ~~222~~ | ~~226~~ | — | — |
| — | Vasileios Konstantinidis (GRE) | B | 102.50 | 160 | 165 | ~~168~~ | 22 | ~~210~~ | ~~210~~ | ~~211~~ | — | — |
| — | Oleksiy Torokhtiy (UKR) | B | 104.61 | ~~167~~ | ~~167~~ | ~~167~~ | — | — | — | — | — | — |
| — | Cody Gibbs (USA) | C | 104.47 | ~~155~~ | ~~155~~ | ~~155~~ | — | — | — | — | — | — |
| — | Marcin Dołęga (POL) | A | 104.25 | ~~193~~ | ~~193~~ | ~~193~~ | — | 226 | ~~232~~ | ~~232~~ | 4 | — |
| — | Libor Wälzer (CZE) | B | 104.63 | ~~163~~ | ~~163~~ | ~~163~~ | — | — | — | — | — | — |
| DQ | Tomáš Matykiewicz (CZE) | B | 104.53 | 167 | ~~170~~ | ~~170~~ | — | ~~203~~ | 203 | — | — | — |
| DQ | Olimbek Achildiev (UZB) | C | 104.52 | 150 | 155 | 160 | — | ~~185~~ | 190 | ~~195~~ | — | — |
