= 2006 World Weightlifting Championships – Men's 105 kg =

The 2006 World Weightlifting Championships were held in Santo Domingo, Dominican Republic from 30 September to 7 October. The men's 105 kilograms division was staged on 6 and 7 October 2006.

== Schedule ==
Date	Time	Event
6 October 2006	16:00	Group C
6 October 2006	18:00	Group B
7 October 2006	12:00	Group A

== Medalists ==
Event	Gold		Silver		Bronze	
Snatch	Dmitry Lapikov (RUS)	194 kg	Marcin Dołęga (POL)	193 kg	Dmitry Klokov (RUS)	188 kg
Clean & Jerk	Marcin Dołęga (POL)	222 kg	Dmitry Lapikov (RUS)	220 kg	Robert Dołęga (POL)	219 kg
Total	Marcin Dołęga (POL)	415 kg	Dmitry Lapikov (RUS)	414 kg	Dmitry Klokov (RUS)	406 kg

== Records ==
Prior to this competition, the existing world records were as follows.

World Record	Snatch	Marcin Dołęga (POL)	199 kg	Władysławowo, Poland	7 May 2006
World Record	Clean & Jerk	World Standard	242 kg	—	1 January 1998
World Record	Total	World Standard	440 kg	—	1 January 1998

== Results ==
Rank	Athlete	Group	Body weight	Snatch (kg)				Clean & Jerk (kg)				Total
Rank	Athlete	Group	Body weight	1	2	3	Rank	1	2	3	Rank	Total
1st place, gold medalist(s)	Marcin Dołęga (POL)	A	105.00	~~193~~	193	~~200~~	2nd place, silver medalist(s)	~~222~~	~~222~~	222	1st place, gold medalist(s)	415
2nd place, silver medalist(s)	Dmitry Lapikov (RUS)	B	104.52	185	190	194	1st place, gold medalist(s)	~~215~~	215	220	2nd place, silver medalist(s)	414
3rd place, bronze medalist(s)	Dmitry Klokov (RUS)	A	104.10	180	185	188	3rd place, bronze medalist(s)	218	~~227~~	~~227~~	4	406
4	Robert Dołęga (POL)	A	104.14	177	~~181~~	181	7	~~216~~	216	219	3rd place, bronze medalist(s)	400
5	Alan Naniyev (AZE)	A	104.58	182	~~186~~	~~186~~	6	210	215	218	5	400
6	Martin Tešovič (SVK)	B	104.81	180	185	—	5	215	~~222~~	~~222~~	9	400
7	Gia Machavariani (GEO)	A	102.73	175	180	~~185~~	8	210	~~215~~	217	6	397
8	Aleh Loban (BLR)	B	104.26	165	171	~~177~~	11	205	212	217	7	388
9	Ibrahim Moursi (EGY)	B	102.24	171	177	~~180~~	9	205	~~210~~	210	12	387
10	Alan Tsagaev (BUL)	A	104.85	170	~~175~~	~~178~~	15	215	~~223~~	~~223~~	10	385
11	Artur Babayan (ARM)	B	103.54	165	170	~~174~~	13	206	213	~~220~~	11	383
12	Oleksiy Torokhtiy (UKR)	B	104.70	~~160~~	160	165	17	200	205	208	13	373
13	Jörg Mazur (GER)	B	104.36	166	171	~~175~~	12	200	~~206~~	~~206~~	15	371
14	Isa Bala (ALB)	B	103.81	170	~~177~~	177	10	192	~~197~~	~~197~~	22	369
15	Aleksandr Urinov (UZB)	B	97.83	167	~~170~~	~~170~~	16	193	~~198~~	198	16	365
16	Moreno Boer (ITA)	B	104.15	160	~~165~~	~~166~~	19	200	~~205~~	205	14	365
17	Kim Hwa-seung (KOR)	B	104.31	161	166	170	14	~~195~~	195	~~200~~	19	365
18	Donny Shankle (USA)	B	104.78	160	165	~~170~~	18	~~195~~	195	~~201~~	20	360
19	Athanasios Tsiridis (GRE)	B	103.05	157	~~162~~	~~162~~	20	192	197	~~202~~	17	354
20	Niti Khameiam (THA)	C	103.87	150	~~156~~	156	21	190	195	~~200~~	18	351
21	Akos Sandor (CAN)	C	105.00	~~150~~	150	155	22	190	~~195~~	195	21	350
22	Janos Nemeshazy (SUI)	B	103.32	150	~~160~~	~~160~~	24	190	~~196~~	~~196~~	23	340
23	Carlos Holguín (DOM)	C	98.72	140	146	150	23	160	167	172	25	322
24	Huang Te-feng (TPE)	C	104.41	142	~~146~~	~~146~~	25	165	170	177	24	319
—	Mikhail Audzeyeu (BLR)	A	104.45	~~175~~	~~175~~	~~175~~	—	212	~~217~~	217	8	—
—	Ahed Joughili (SYR)	A	103.56	~~177~~	~~177~~	~~177~~	—	~~223~~	~~223~~	~~223~~	—	—
—	Marcos Lizama (CHI)	C	104.59	~~140~~	~~140~~	140	26	~~160~~	~~160~~	~~160~~	—	—
—	Bakhyt Akhmetov (KAZ)	A	102.98	180	185	~~188~~	4	~~221~~	~~221~~	~~221~~	—	—
—	Andre Rohde (GER)	B	104.19	~~168~~	—	—	—	—	—	—	—	—
