= 2001 World Weightlifting Championships – Men's 105 kg =

The 2001 World Weightlifting Championships were held in Antalya, Turkey from November 4 to November 11. The men's competition in the heavyweight (105 kg) division was staged on 10 November 2001.

== Medalists ==
Event	Gold		Silver		Bronze	
Snatch	Vladimir Smorchkov (RUS)	197.5 kg	Alexandru Bratan (MDA)	190.0 kg	Ihor Razoronov (UKR)	187.5 kg
Clean & Jerk	Bünyamin Sudaş (TUR)	235.0 kg	Ihor Razoronov (UKR)	230.0 kg	Alexandru Bratan (MDA)	225.0 kg
Total	Vladimir Smorchkov (RUS)	422.5 kg	Bünyamin Sudaş (TUR)	420.0 kg	Ihor Razoronov (UKR)	417.5 kg

== Records ==
Prior to this competition, the existing world records were as follows.

World Record	Snatch	World Standard	197.5 kg	—	1 January 1998
World Record	Clean & Jerk	World Standard	242.5 kg	—	1 January 1998
World Record	Total	World Standard	440.0 kg	—	1 January 1998

== Results ==
Rank	Athlete	Body weight	Snatch (kg)				Clean & Jerk (kg)				Total
Rank	Athlete	Body weight	1	2	3	Rank	1	2	3	Rank	Total
1st place, gold medalist(s)	Vladimir Smorchkov (RUS)	103.24	190.0	195.0	198.0	1st place, gold medalist(s)	220.0	225.0	~~230.0~~	4	422.5
2nd place, silver medalist(s)	Bünyamin Sudaş (TUR)	103.40	~~185.0~~	~~185.0~~	185.0	5	225.0	230.0	235.0	1st place, gold medalist(s)	420.0
3rd place, bronze medalist(s)	Ihor Razoronov (UKR)	104.70	187.5	~~192.5~~	~~192.5~~	3rd place, bronze medalist(s)	230.0	~~237.5~~	~~237.5~~	2nd place, silver medalist(s)	417.5
4	Alexandru Bratan (MDA)	103.06	187.5	190.0	~~192.5~~	2nd place, silver medalist(s)	220.0	225.0	~~227.5~~	3rd place, bronze medalist(s)	415.0
5	Robert Dołęga (POL)	104.32	180.0	185.0	~~187.5~~	8	225.0	~~230.0~~	~~232.5~~	6	410.0
6	Viacheslav Ivanovski (RUS)	104.74	~~187.5~~	~~187.5~~	187.5	4	222.5	~~227.5~~	~~227.5~~	8	410.0
7	Florin Vlad (ROM)	104.04	~~180.0~~	180.0	185.0	6	~~220.0~~	220.0	~~227.5~~	10	405.0
8	Alan Tsagaev (BUL)	104.30	180.0	~~182.5~~	—	11	~~225.0~~	~~225.0~~	225.0	5	405.0
9	Marcin Dołęga (POL)	104.56	180.0	185.0	~~190.0~~	10	215.0	~~220.0~~	220.0	11	405.0
10	Metin Kadir (BUL)	104.12	180.0	~~185.0~~	185.0	7	215.0	~~222.5~~	~~222.5~~	13	400.0
11	Zoltán Kovács (HUN)	102.32	172.5	~~180.0~~	~~180.0~~	15	210.0	222.5	~~227.5~~	7	395.0
12	Andre Rohde (GER)	103.34	170.0	~~175.0~~	175.0	13	210.0	217.5	~~220.0~~	12	392.5
13	Aleh Liashko (BLR)	104.42	170.0	175.0	~~180.0~~	14	205.0	210.0	215.0	15	390.0
14	Konstantinos Gkaripis (GRE)	99.90	167.5	~~172.5~~	~~172.5~~	18	217.5	220.0	~~225.0~~	9	387.5
15	Silvio Ajfrid (AUT)	104.28	~~170.0~~	170.0	~~175.0~~	17	205.0	212.5	215.0	14	385.0
16	Jörg Mazur (GER)	102.16	165.0	170.0	175.0	12	207.5	~~215.0~~	~~215.0~~	16	382.5
17	Emil Aliyev (AZE)	104.26	162.5	170.0	~~175.0~~	16	190.0	195.0	200.0	19	370.0
18	Akos Sandor (CAN)	104.44	160.0	~~165.0~~	165.0	20	195.0	~~200.0~~	200.0	20	365.0
19	Lorenzo Carrió (ESP)	104.76	155.0	~~160.0~~	160.0	21	190.0	195.0	~~200.0~~	21	355.0
20	Delroy McQueen (GBR)	104.86	150.0	~~155.0~~	~~155.0~~	25	195.0	202.5	—	17	352.5
21	Jim Gyllenhammar (SWE)	103.44	150.0	~~155.0~~	~~155.0~~	24	~~192.5~~	192.5	200.0	18	350.0
22	Janos Nemeshazy (SUI)	103.54	147.5	152.5	155.0	22	187.5	192.5	—	22	347.5
23	Gurbinder Singh Cheema (GBR)	103.98	~~155.0~~	155.0	~~160.0~~	23	185.0	190.0	~~195.0~~	23	345.0
24	Manjeet Singh (IND)	97.72	135.0	140.0	145.0	26	175.0	180.0	~~182.5~~	25	325.0
25	Gunnar Løgdahl (SWE)	100.38	140.0	~~150.0~~	~~150.0~~	29	180.0	185.0	~~190.0~~	24	325.0
26	Aydin Mammadov (AZE)	102.22	~~145.0~~	145.0	~~155.0~~	27	170.0	177.5	~~185.0~~	26	322.5
27	Saša Čegar (CRO)	98.66	135.0	140.0	~~142.5~~	28	165.0	170.0	~~175.0~~	27	310.0
—	Hossein Tavakkoli (IRI)	104.40	185.0	~~190.0~~	~~190.0~~	9	~~220.0~~	~~220.0~~	~~225.0~~	—	—
—	Zurab Avtandilashvili (GEO)	99.18	~~160.0~~	160.0	165.0	19	~~195.0~~	~~195.0~~	~~195.0~~	—	—
—	Abdulaziz Alpak (TUR)	103.76	~~185.0~~	~~185.0~~	—	—	—	—	—	—	—
—	Khudair Sobhi (IRQ)	103.70	—	—	—	—	—	—	—	—	—
DQ	Rafik Chakhoyan (ARM)	102.94	~~175.0~~	175.0	180.0	—	210.0	215.0	~~220.0~~	—	—

== New records ==
Snatch	198.0 kg	Vladimir Smorchkov (RUS)	WR
