= Weightlifting at the 2006 Asian Games – Men's 105 kg =

Men's 105 kg at the 2006 Asian Games
- Venue: Al-Dana Banquet Hall
- Date: 6 December 2006
- Competitors: 14 from 10 nations

Medalists
gold medal	Ahed Joughili	Syria
silver medal	Mohammed Jasim	Iraq
bronze medal	Bakhyt Akhmetov	Kazakhstan

The men's 105 kilograms event at the 2006 Asian Games took place on December 6, 2006 at Al-Dana Banquet Hall in Doha.

== Schedule ==
All times are Arabia Standard Time (UTC+03:00)

Date	Time	Event
Wednesday, 6 December 2006	10:00	Group B
Wednesday, 6 December 2006	16:00	Group A

== Records ==
Prior to this competition, the existing world, Asian and Games records were as follows.

World Record	Snatch	Marcin Dołęga (POL)	199 kg	Władysławowo, Poland	7 May 2006
World Record	Clean & Jerk	World Standard	242 kg	—	1 January 1998
World Record	Total	World Standard	440 kg	—	1 January 1998
Asian Record	Snatch	Cui Wenhua (CHN)	195 kg	Lahti, Finland	14 November 1998
Asian Record	Clean & Jerk	Hossein Tavakkoli (IRI)	235 kg	Sydney, Australia	25 September 2000
Asian Record	Total	Hossein Tavakkoli (IRI)	425 kg	Sydney, Australia	25 September 2000
Games Record	Snatch	Cui Wenhua (CHN)	195 kg	Bangkok, Thailand	13 December 1998
Games Record	Clean & Jerk	Said Saif Asaad (QAT)	225 kg	Busan, South Korea	9 October 2002
Games Record	Total	Said Saif Asaad (QAT)	417 kg	Busan, South Korea	9 October 2002

== Results ==
Legend

- NM — No mark

Rank	Athlete	Group	Body weight	Snatch (kg)				Clean & Jerk (kg)				Total
Rank	Athlete	Group	Body weight	1	2	3	Result	1	2	3	Result	Total
1st place, gold medalist(s)	Ahed Joughili (SYR)	A	105.00	170	~~175~~	~~175~~	170	212	219	222	222	392
2nd place, silver medalist(s)	Mohammed Jasim (IRQ)	A	103.88	170	175	~~177~~	175	213	216	~~220~~	216	391
3rd place, bronze medalist(s)	Bakhyt Akhmetov (KAZ)	A	101.13	175	~~180~~	~~180~~	175	205	213	~~217~~	213	388
4	Kim Hwa-seung (KOR)	A	104.52	170	174	176	176	~~200~~	200	~~205~~	200	376
5	Khudair Sobhi (IRQ)	A	104.16	165	~~170~~	~~170~~	165	~~205~~	~~205~~	205	205	370
6	Mohammad Ali (SYR)	A	103.32	~~155~~	155	160	160	200	206	~~210~~	206	366
7	Sergey Sedov (KAZ)	B	94.22	145	152	157	157	170	180	~~186~~	180	337
8	Sajjad Amin Malik (PAK)	B	104.13	140	145	147	147	170	175	~~178~~	175	322
9	Ahmed Jasim (BRN)	B	103.73	125	135	~~141~~	135	155	160	~~165~~	160	295
10	Ranjith Kumara (SRI)	B	98.65	120	130	~~135~~	130	~~150~~	150	~~160~~	150	280
11	Issa Al-Ansari (QAT)	B	103.08	75	~~80~~	~~85~~	75	100	105	~~111~~	105	180
—	Renante Briones (PHI)	B	103.54	~~140~~	140	~~150~~	140	~~182~~	~~182~~	~~182~~	—	NM
—	Said Saif Asaad (QAT)	A	104.45	~~170~~	~~170~~	~~170~~	—	—	—	—	—	NM
DQ	Aleksandr Urinov (UZB)	A	98.27	165	170	~~172~~	170	~~195~~	~~195~~	195	195	~~365~~

- Aleksandr Urinov of Uzbekistan originally finished 7th, but was disqualified after he tested positive for cannabis.
