= 2009 World Weightlifting Championships – Men's 105 kg =

The men's competition in the heavyweight (– 105 kg) division was staged on November 29, 2009.

== Schedule ==
Date	Time	Event
29 November 2009	09:00	Group B
29 November 2009	13:00	Group A

== Medalists ==
Event	Gold		Silver		Bronze	
Snatch	Marcin Dołęga (POL)	195 kg	Kim Hwa-seung (KOR)	182 kg	Roman Konstantinov (RUS)	180 kg
Clean & Jerk	Marcin Dołęga (POL)	226 kg	Roman Konstantinov (RUS)	220 kg	Ahed Joughili (SYR)	218 kg
Total	Marcin Dołęga (POL)	421 kg	Roman Konstantinov (RUS)	400 kg	Oleksiy Torokhtiy (UKR)	395 kg

== Records ==
Prior to this competition, the existing world records were as follows.

World Record	Snatch	Andrei Aramnau (BLR)	200 kg	Beijing, China	18 August 2008
World Record	Clean & Jerk	Alan Tsagaev (BUL)	237 kg	Kyiv, Ukraine	25 April 2004
World Record	Total	Andrei Aramnau (BLR)	436 kg	Beijing, China	18 August 2008

== Results ==
Rank	Athlete	Group	Body weight	Snatch (kg)				Clean & Jerk (kg)				Total
Rank	Athlete	Group	Body weight	1	2	3	Rank	1	2	3	Rank	Total
1st place, gold medalist(s)	Marcin Dołęga (POL)	A	104.95	~~191~~	191	195	1st place, gold medalist(s)	221	~~226~~	226	1st place, gold medalist(s)	421
2nd place, silver medalist(s)	Roman Konstantinov (RUS)	A	101.31	180	~~185~~	~~185~~	3rd place, bronze medalist(s)	215	220	~~228~~	2nd place, silver medalist(s)	400
3rd place, bronze medalist(s)	Oleksiy Torokhtiy (UKR)	A	104.31	176	180	~~183~~	5	215	~~221~~	~~221~~	5	395
4	Kim Hwa-seung (KOR)	A	104.95	~~177~~	177	182	2nd place, silver medalist(s)	~~210~~	210	~~216~~	8	392
5	Robert Dołęga (POL)	A	104.95	175	~~179~~	~~179~~	7	211	~~216~~	216	4	391
6	Gia Machavariani (GEO)	A	104.09	180	~~185~~	~~185~~	4	210	~~215~~	~~216~~	6	390
7	Ahed Joughili (SYR)	A	104.82	~~170~~	~~170~~	172	8	218	~~223~~	~~223~~	3rd place, bronze medalist(s)	390
8	Mykola Hordiychuk (UKR)	B	103.88	170	175	178	6	202	207	~~212~~	9	385
9	Egidijus Remėza (LTU)	B	104.62	165	170	~~175~~	9	205	~~210~~	210	7	380
10	Alibay Samadov (AZE)	B	100.25	155	162	~~167~~	11	200	~~206~~	~~210~~	13	362
11	Libor Wälzer (CZE)	B	104.98	~~160~~	~~160~~	160	13	190	198	202	12	362
12	Cody Gibbs (USA)	B	104.25	160	164	167	10	181	185	190	14	357
13	Ángel Daza (VEN)	B	104.12	150	~~155~~	~~155~~	15	206	~~211~~	~~212~~	10	356
14	Leonel Albarrán (VEN)	B	103.39	150	~~155~~	~~155~~	14	205	205	~~210~~	11	355
15	Luis Osuna (MEX)	B	104.03	~~156~~	156	160	12	180	185	~~188~~	15	345
16	Sakher Qalaja (PLE)	B	94.35	115	123	~~125~~	16	150	157	162	16	285
17	Albert Abotsi (GHA)	B	104.79	115	117	120	17	150	~~155~~	156	17	276
DQ	Dmitry Lapikov (RUS)	A	104.45	186	191	194	—	222	~~227~~	~~227~~	—	—
DQ	Albert Kuzilov (GEO)	A	104.65	181	~~187~~	187	—	221	~~230~~	~~234~~	—	—
