= 2002 World Weightlifting Championships – Men's 105 kg =

The 2002 World Weightlifting Championships were held in Warsaw, Poland from 19 November to 26 November. The men's 105 kilograms division was staged on 25 November 2002.

== Schedule ==
Date	Time	Event
25 November 2002	12:00	Group C
25 November 2002	14:00	Group B
25 November 2002	17:00	Group A

== Medalists ==
Event	Gold		Silver		Bronze	
Snatch	Vladimir Smorchkov (RUS)	197.5 kg	Marcin Dołęga (POL)	192.5 kg	Denys Hotfrid (UKR)	190.0 kg
Clean & Jerk	Alan Tsagaev (BUL)	232.5 kg	Bünyamin Sudaş (TUR)	230.0 kg	Denys Hotfrid (UKR)	230.0 kg
Total	Denys Hotfrid (UKR)	420.0 kg	Alan Tsagaev (BUL)	417.5 kg	Vladimir Smorchkov (RUS)	417.5 kg

== Records ==
Prior to this competition, the existing world records were as follows.

World Record	Snatch	Marcin Dołęga (POL)	198.5 kg	Havířov, Czech Republic	4 June 2002
World Record	Clean & Jerk	World Standard	242.5 kg	—	1 January 1998
World Record	Total	World Standard	440.0 kg	—	1 January 1998

== Results ==
Rank	Athlete	Group	Body weight	Snatch (kg)				Clean & Jerk (kg)				Total
Rank	Athlete	Group	Body weight	1	2	3	Rank	1	2	3	Rank	Total
1st place, gold medalist(s)	Denys Hotfrid (UKR)	A	104.05	185.0	~~190.0~~	190.0	3rd place, bronze medalist(s)	225.0	230.0	~~235.0~~	3rd place, bronze medalist(s)	420.0
2nd place, silver medalist(s)	Alan Tsagaev (BUL)	A	104.20	~~185.0~~	185.0	~~190.0~~	6	232.5	~~237.5~~	~~237.5~~	1st place, gold medalist(s)	417.5
3rd place, bronze medalist(s)	Vladimir Smorchkov (RUS)	B	104.65	190.0	197.5	~~200.0~~	1st place, gold medalist(s)	220.0	~~227.5~~	~~227.5~~	10	417.5
4	Bünyamin Sudaş (TUR)	A	103.30	180.0	~~185.0~~	185.0	5	230.0	~~235.0~~	~~235.0~~	2nd place, silver medalist(s)	415.0
5	Hossein Tavakkoli (IRI)	A	104.30	185.0	~~190.0~~	~~190.0~~	7	222.5	230.0	~~235.0~~	4	415.0
6	Marcin Dołęga (POL)	A	104.05	~~192.5~~	192.5	~~197.5~~	2nd place, silver medalist(s)	220.0	~~225.0~~	~~225.0~~	8	412.5
7	Robert Dołęga (POL)	A	104.25	180.0	185.0	187.5	4	225.0	~~230.0~~	~~230.0~~	5	412.5
8	Andre Rohde (GER)	A	104.35	177.5	182.5	185.0	8	217.5	222.5	~~227.5~~	6	407.5
9	Gleb Pisarevskiy (RUS)	A	104.50	~~185.0~~	185.0	~~190.0~~	9	~~222.5~~	222.5	~~230.0~~	7	407.5
10	Florin Vlad (ROM)	B	104.55	180.0	~~185.0~~	~~185.0~~	13	215.0	220.0	~~225.0~~	9	400.0
11	Aleko Nozadze (GEO)	B	103.20	175.0	180.0	~~182.5~~	10	210.0	~~215.0~~	215.0	11	395.0
12	Matthias Steiner (AUT)	A	104.20	177.5	180.0	~~182.5~~	12	215.0	~~217.5~~	~~217.5~~	12	395.0
13	Jörg Mazur (GER)	B	104.10	175.0	~~180.0~~	180.0	11	~~210.0~~	~~210.0~~	210.0	13	390.0
14	Ferenc Gyurkovics (HUN)	B	104.70	~~180.0~~	180.0	~~185.0~~	14	~~205.0~~	205.0	~~210.0~~	16	385.0
15	Peter Kelley (USA)	C	104.90	~~162.5~~	162.5	~~167.5~~	17	~~200.0~~	200.0	207.5	15	370.0
16	Mykola Boborykin (UKR)	B	105.00	~~165.0~~	165.0	~~170.0~~	16	~~205.0~~	~~205.0~~	205.0	17	370.0
17	Lars Andersson (SWE)	C	104.95	155.0	162.5	~~165.0~~	18	187.5	195.0	~~200.0~~	18	357.5
18	Miikka Huhtala (FIN)	C	104.75	160.0	~~165.0~~	165.0	15	~~190.0~~	190.0	~~202.5~~	20	355.0
19	Akos Sandor (CAN)	C	104.95	150.0	~~155.0~~	155.0	19	190.0	195.0	~~200.0~~	19	350.0
20	Saša Čegar (CRO)	C	102.50	142.5	~~147.5~~	147.5	20	177.5	185.0	~~190.0~~	21	332.5
—	Geir Grønnevik (NOR)	C	99.55	~~142.5~~	~~142.5~~	142.5	22	~~180.0~~	~~180.0~~	~~180.0~~	—	—
—	Angelos Ioannou (CYP)	C	101.45	~~130.0~~	~~130.0~~	~~132.5~~	—	~~155.0~~	—	—	—	—
—	Ammar Yosr (IRQ)	C	103.00	~~145.0~~	~~145.0~~	145.0	21	~~175.0~~	~~175.0~~	~~175.0~~	—	—
—	Zurab Avtandilashvili (GEO)	B	104.05	—	—	—	—	—	—	—	—	—
—	Moreno Boer (ITA)	B	104.55	~~180.0~~	~~180.0~~	~~180.0~~	—	~~210.0~~	210.0	~~222.5~~	14	—
