= 2010 World Weightlifting Championships – Men's 105 kg =

The men's competition in the heavyweight (– 105 kg) division was held on 25 and 26 September 2010.

== Schedule ==
Date	Time	Event
25 September 2010	08:00	Group D
25 September 2010	10:00	Group C
26 September 2010	08:00	Group B
26 September 2010	10:00	Group A

== Medalists ==
Event	Gold		Silver		Bronze	
Snatch	Dmitry Klokov (RUS)	192 kg	Vladimir Smorchkov (RUS)	190 kg	Marcin Dołęga (POL)	188 kg
Clean & Jerk	Marcin Dołęga (POL)	227 kg	Dmitry Klokov (RUS)	223 kg	Bartłomiej Bonk (POL)	222 kg
Total	Marcin Dołęga (POL)	415 kg	Dmitry Klokov (RUS)	415 kg	Vladimir Smorchkov (RUS)	410 kg

== Records ==
Prior to this competition, the existing world records were as follows.

World Record	Snatch	Andrei Aramnau (BLR)	200 kg	Beijing, China	18 August 2008
World Record	Clean & Jerk	Alan Tsagaev (BUL)	237 kg	Kyiv, Ukraine	25 April 2004
World Record	Total	Andrei Aramnau (BLR)	436 kg	Beijing, China	18 August 2008

== Results ==
Rank	Athlete	Group	Body weight	Snatch (kg)				Clean & Jerk (kg)				Total
Rank	Athlete	Group	Body weight	1	2	3	Rank	1	2	3	Rank	Total
1st place, gold medalist(s)	Marcin Dołęga (POL)	A	104.11	188	~~191~~	~~192~~	3rd place, bronze medalist(s)	218	227	~~238~~	1st place, gold medalist(s)	415
2nd place, silver medalist(s)	Dmitry Klokov (RUS)	A	104.43	185	190	192	1st place, gold medalist(s)	218	223	~~227~~	2nd place, silver medalist(s)	415
3rd place, bronze medalist(s)	Vladimir Smorchkov (RUS)	A	103.87	190	~~193~~	~~195~~	2nd place, silver medalist(s)	215	220	~~225~~	5	410
4	Bartłomiej Bonk (POL)	A	102.77	~~180~~	180	~~185~~	6	211	218	222	3rd place, bronze medalist(s)	402
5	Ivan Efremov (UZB)	A	104.28	175	~~179~~	181	5	210	217	221	4	402
6	Sergey Istomin (KAZ)	A	104.26	175	182	~~185~~	4	210	215	~~220~~	7	397
7	Artur Babayan (ARM)	A	104.07	170	176	~~181~~	10	212	~~218~~	218	6	394
8	Gia Machavariani (GEO)	A	104.13	175	180	~~183~~	7	210	~~215~~	~~215~~	10	390
9	Kim Hwa-seung (KOR)	A	104.65	175	180	~~183~~	8	~~210~~	210	~~217~~	12	390
10	Martin Tešovič (SVK)	B	104.48	175	~~180~~	~~180~~	14	205	~~211~~	212	8	387
11	Mykola Hordiychuk (UKR)	B	103.99	~~175~~	175	~~180~~	12	205	~~210~~	211	9	386
12	Mikhail Audzeyeu (BLR)	B	103.99	~~175~~	175	~~180~~	13	205	~~211~~	~~211~~	15	380
13	Mohsen Beiranvand (IRI)	B	104.95	173	176	~~178~~	11	~~203~~	~~203~~	203	16	379
14	Mohammad Reza Barari (IRI)	B	104.40	167	~~173~~	~~173~~	19	210	~~220~~	~~220~~	11	377
15	Artūrs Plēsnieks (LAT)	B	103.16	~~164~~	164	~~169~~	21	208	~~214~~	~~215~~	13	372
16	Igor Vashanov (KAZ)	B	98.81	165	170	~~175~~	17	195	200	~~205~~	19	370
17	Lázaro López (CUB)	B	104.91	~~163~~	163	168	18	~~202~~	202	—	18	370
18	Ferenc Gyurkovics (HUN)	C	104.94	170	175	~~178~~	15	195	~~200~~	~~201~~	24	370
19	Jorge Arroyo (ECU)	B	99.43	172	~~177~~	~~177~~	16	195	~~200~~	~~202~~	22	367
20	Teimuraz Gogia (GEO)	C	101.33	160	165	~~168~~	20	190	195	~~198~~	23	360
21	Ángel Daza (VEN)	D	102.63	147	151	154	29	200	~~206~~	206	14	360
22	René Horn (GER)	C	99.80	150	155	~~159~~	27	196	202	~~205~~	17	357
23	Anton Mazeika (BLR)	C	104.35	155	~~158~~	158	25	190	195	199	21	357
24	Casey Burgener (USA)	C	103.30	155	162	~~167~~	22	182	189	~~194~~	29	351
25	Iļja Meņšikovs (LAT)	C	104.07	157	161	~~165~~	23	~~190~~	190	~~195~~	28	351
26	Libor Wälzer (CZE)	C	104.25	~~153~~	153	156	26	187	~~193~~	194	25	350
27	Tomáš Matykiewicz (CZE)	C	104.32	154	158	~~161~~	24	~~188~~	189	~~194~~	30	347
28	José Familia (DOM)	D	103.17	147	151	154	30	~~185~~	185	190	27	344
29	Donny Shankle (USA)	C	104.81	150	~~155~~	155	28	~~188~~	189	~~197~~	31	344
30	Konstantinos Gkaripis (GRE)	D	98.06	145	150	~~154~~	31	~~185~~	~~190~~	190	26	340
31	Tornike Kokaia (AZE)	D	104.93	145	~~152~~	~~155~~	32	~~185~~	185	~~197~~	32	330
32	Yang Chih-yu (TPE)	D	104.50	135	140	~~145~~	36	175	182	~~187~~	33	322
33	Liu Chen-chuan (TPE)	D	104.97	135	142	~~147~~	33	~~180~~	180	~~190~~	35	322
34	Federico Fiore (ITA)	D	101.02	~~140~~	140	~~148~~	35	~~180~~	180	~~187~~	34	320
35	V. A. Christopher (IND)	D	99.00	135	~~140~~	140	34	~~175~~	175	179	36	319
36	Alexandros Kouvakas (CAN)	D	104.82	~~137~~	137	~~142~~	37	170	~~180~~	~~185~~	37	307
—	Modestas Šimkus (LTU)	B	104.71	177	~~183~~	—	9	—	—	—	—	—
—	Alibay Samadov (AZE)	C	101.07	~~160~~	~~160~~	~~160~~	—	200	—	—	20	—
—	Salwan Jasim (IRQ)	D	98.82	153	~~158~~	~~158~~	—	190	195	~~201~~	—	—
DQ	Ruslan Ramazanow (TKM)	C	100.85	~~160~~	160	~~165~~	—	190	196	200	—	—
