= Weightlifting at the 2008 Summer Olympics – Men's 105 kg =

Men's 105 kg at the Games of the XXIX Olympiad
- Venue: Beihang University Gymnasium
- Date: 18 August 2008
- Competitors: 20 from 16 nations

Medalists
1st place, gold medalist(s)		Andrei Aramnau	Belarus
2nd place, silver medalist(s)		Dmitry Klokov	Russia
3rd place, bronze medalist(s)		Marcin Dołęga	Poland

The men's 105 kilograms weightlifting event was the seventh men's event at the weightlifting competition, limiting competitors to a maximum of 105 kilograms of body mass. The whole competition took place on August 18, but was divided into two parts due to the number of competitors. Group B weightlifters competed at 15:30, and Group A, at 19:00. This event was the fourteenth Weightlifting event to conclude.

Each lifter performed in both the snatch and clean and jerk lifts, with the final score being the sum of the lifter's best result in each. The athlete received three attempts in each of the two lifts; the score for the lift was the heaviest weight successfully lifted.

== Schedule ==
All times are China Standard Time (UTC+08:00)

Date	Time	Event
18 August 2008	15:30	Group B
18 August 2008	19:00	Group A

== Records ==
Prior to this competition, the existing world and Olympic records were as follows.

World Record	Snatch	Marcin Dołęga (POL)	199 kg	Władysławowo, Poland	7 May 2006
World Record	Clean & Jerk	Alan Tsagaev (BUL)	237 kg	Kyiv, Ukraine	25 April 2004
World Record	Total	Denys Hotfrid (UKR)	430 kg	Athens, Greece	28 November 1999
Olympic Record	Snatch	Dmitry Berestov (RUS)	195 kg	Athens, Greece	24 August 2004
Olympic Record	Clean & Jerk	Olympic Standard	235 kg	—	1 January 1997
Olympic Record	Total	Olympic Standard	427 kg	—	1 January 1997

== Results ==
Rank	Athlete	Group	Body weight	Snatch (kg)				Clean & Jerk (kg)				Total
Rank	Athlete	Group	Body weight	1	2	3	Result	1	2	3	Result	Total
1st place, gold medalist(s)	Andrei Aramnau (BLR)	A	104.76	193	197	200	200	225	230	236	236	436
2nd place, silver medalist(s)	Dmitry Klokov (RUS)	A	104.72	185	190	193	193	222	226	230	230	423
3rd place, bronze medalist(s)	Marcin Dołęga (POL)	A	104.37	195	~~200~~	~~201~~	195	225	~~228~~	~~228~~	225	420
4	Bakhyt Akhmetov (KAZ)	A	102.13	185	190	~~195~~	190	221	225	~~230~~	225	415
5	Albert Kuzilov (GEO)	A	102.48	~~178~~	~~182~~	182	182	220	227	~~228~~	227	409
6	Sergey Istomin (KAZ)	A	102.03	~~181~~	181	~~187~~	181	215	220	225	225	406
7	Robert Dołęga (POL)	A	104.27	178	181	184	184	217	~~221~~	221	221	405
8	Nikolaos Kourtidis (GRE)	B	103.36	171	~~176~~	176	176	210	215	221	221	397
9	Mohsen Beiranvand (IRI)	B	104.34	~~180~~	180	~~184~~	180	~~210~~	210	~~216~~	210	390
10	Oleksiy Torokhtiy (UKR)	B	104.64	172	177	~~181~~	177	213	~~220~~	~~220~~	213	390
11	Ahed Joughili (SYR)	B	104.90	~~170~~	170	~~175~~	170	~~215~~	~~215~~	216	216	386
12	Abdelrahman El-Sayed (EGY)	B	104.84	172	175	~~178~~	175	210	~~216~~	~~216~~	210	385
13	Bünyamin Sudaş (TUR)	B	104.39	163	~~166~~	166	166	202	207	~~210~~	207	373
14	Libor Wälzer (CZE)	B	104.64	158	163	~~166~~	163	~~187~~	187	~~193~~	187	350
15	Christian López (GUA)	B	103.76	150	~~155~~	~~155~~	150	180	~~186~~	186	186	336
16	Moreno Boer (ITA)	B	104.45	~~150~~	~~150~~	150	150	180	~~185~~	~~185~~	180	330
—	Ramūnas Vyšniauskas (LTU)	A	104.18	~~180~~	180	~~183~~	180	~~220~~	—	—	—	—
—	Martin Tešovič (SVK)	B	104.47	—	—	—	—	—	—	—	—	—
DQ	Dmitry Lapikov (RUS)	A	104.30	190	~~195~~	~~195~~	190	222	226	230	230	~~420~~
DQ	Ihor Razoronov (UKR)	A	104.58	~~185~~	~~185~~	187	187	223	~~234~~	~~234~~	223	~~410~~

- Dmitry Lapikov of Russia originally finished third, but was disqualified after he tested positive for dehydrochlormethyltestosterone.
- Ihor Razoronov of Ukraine originally finished sixth, but was disqualified after he tested positive for nandrolone.

== New records ==
Snatch	197 kg	Andrei Aramnau (BLR)	OR
Snatch	200 kg	Andrei Aramnau (BLR)	WR
Clean & Jerk	236 kg	Andrei Aramnau (BLR)	OR
Total	430 kg	Andrei Aramnau (BLR)	OR
Total	436 kg	Andrei Aramnau (BLR)	WR
