= Weightlifting at the 2004 Summer Olympics – Men's 105 kg =

Weightlifting at the Olympics

Men's 105 kg at the Games of the XXVIII Olympiad
- Venue: Nikaia Olympic Weightlifting Hall
- Date: 24 August 2004
- Competitors: 22 from 19 nations

Medalists
1st place, gold medalist(s)		Dmitry Berestov	Russia
2nd place, silver medalist(s)		Ihor Razoronov	Ukraine
3rd place, bronze medalist(s)		Gleb Pisarevskiy	Russia

The men's 105 kilograms weightlifting event at the 2004 Summer Olympics in Athens, Greece took place at the Nikaia Olympic Weightlifting Hall on 24 August.

Total score was the sum of the lifter's best result in each of the snatch and the clean and jerk, with three lifts allowed for each lift. In case of a tie, the lighter lifter won; if still tied, the lifter who took the fewest attempts to achieve the total score won. Lifters without a valid snatch score did not perform the clean and jerk.

== Schedule ==
All times are Eastern European Summer Time (UTC+03:00)

Date	Time	Event
24 August 2004	16:30	Group B
24 August 2004	20:00	Group A

== Records ==
{{{caption}}}
World Record	Snatch	Marcin Dołęga (POL)	198.5 kg	Havířov, Czech Republic	4 June 2002
World Record	Clean & Jerk	World Standard	242.5 kg	—	1 January 1998
World Record	Total	World Standard	440.0 kg	—	1 January 1998
Olympic Record	Snatch	Olympic Standard	192.5 kg	—	1 January 1997
Olympic Record	Clean & Jerk	Olympic Standard	235.0 kg	—	1 January 1997
Olympic Record	Total	Olympic Standard	427.5 kg	—	1 January 1997

== Results ==
Rank	Athlete	Group	Body weight	Snatch (kg)				Clean & Jerk (kg)				Total
Rank	Athlete	Group	Body weight	1	2	3	Result	1	2	3	Result	Total
1st place, gold medalist(s)	Dmitry Berestov (RUS)	A	104.68	187.5	192.5	195.0	195.0	225.0	230.0	~~232.5~~	230.0	425.0
2nd place, silver medalist(s)	Ihor Razoronov (UKR)	A	104.60	185.0	~~190.0~~	190.0	190.0	~~230.0~~	230.0	~~235.0~~	230.0	420.0
3rd place, bronze medalist(s)	Gleb Pisarevskiy (RUS)	A	104.14	~~190.0~~	~~190.0~~	190.0	190.0	225.0	~~230.0~~	~~230.0~~	225.0	415.0
4	Alexandru Bratan (MDA)	A	104.24	187.5	192.5	~~195.0~~	192.5	222.5	~~227.5~~	~~227.5~~	222.5	415.0
5	Ramūnas Vyšniauskas (LTU)	B	103.91	182.5	187.5	~~190.0~~	187.5	222.5	~~227.5~~	~~227.5~~	222.5	410.0
6	Alan Naniyev (AZE)	B	104.34	~~190.0~~	190.0	~~195.0~~	190.0	~~220.0~~	220.0	~~227.5~~	220.0	410.0
7	Matthias Steiner (AUT)	A	104.35	~~182.5~~	~~182.5~~	182.5	182.5	222.5	~~230.0~~	~~230.0~~	222.5	405.0
8	Aleksandr Urinov (UZB)	B	102.22	180.0	185.0	~~190.0~~	185.0	210.0	~~215.0~~	215.0	215.0	400.0
9	Mikhail Audzeyeu (BLR)	B	104.93	175.0	180.0	185.0	185.0	215.0	~~225.0~~	~~225.0~~	215.0	400.0
10	Andre Rohde (GER)	B	103.90	~~177.5~~	177.5	~~182.5~~	177.5	217.5	~~222.5~~	~~225.0~~	217.5	395.0
11	Michel Batista (CUB)	B	103.96	~~175.0~~	177.5	182.5	182.5	207.5	212.5	~~215.0~~	212.5	395.0
12	Tomáš Matykiewicz (CZE)	B	103.74	~~177.5~~	177.5	~~182.5~~	177.5	~~215.0~~	~~215.0~~	215.0	215.0	392.5
13	Sam Pera (COK)	B	104.82	130.0	135.0	~~140.0~~	135.0	165.0	170.0	~~175.0~~	170.0	305.0
14	Eleei Lalio (ASA)	B	101.44	125.0	~~132.5~~	~~140.0~~	125.0	160.0	170.0	~~177.5~~	170.0	295.0
—	Akos Sandor (CAN)	B	104.92	~~162.5~~	~~162.5~~	~~162.5~~	—	—	—	—	—	—
—	Martin Tešovič (SVK)	A	102.56	~~187.5~~	~~187.5~~	~~187.5~~	—	—	—	—	—	—
—	Said Saif Asaad (QAT)	A	104.55	187.5	192.5	—	192.5	—	—	—	—	—
—	Mohsen Beiranvand (IRI)	A	104.02	~~180.0~~	~~180.0~~	~~180.0~~	—	—	—	—	—	—
—	Robert Dołęga (POL)	A	103.83	~~180.0~~	~~180.0~~	~~182.5~~	—	—	—	—	—	—
DQ	Ferenc Gyurkovics (HUN)	A	104.41	187.5	~~192.5~~	195.0	195.0	~~220.0~~	~~222.5~~	225.0	225.0	~~420.0~~
DQ	Mykola Hordiychuk (UKR)	B	102.54	185.0	~~192.5~~	~~192.5~~	185.0	210.0	—	—	210.0	~~395.0~~
DQ	Zoltán Kovács (HUN)	A	102.59	~~180.0~~	—	—	—	—	—	—	—	—

- Ferenc Gyurkovics of Hungary originally won the silver medal, Mykola Hordiychuk of Ukraine originally finished twelfth, and Zoltán Kovács of Hungary originally retired due to injury, but all three were disqualified after they tested positive for drugs (Gyurkovics for oxandrolone, and Hordiychuk and Kovács for anabolic steroids).

== New records ==
Snatch	195.0 kg	Dmitry Berestov (RUS)	OR
