= Weightlifting at the 2000 Summer Olympics – Men's 105 kg =

Weightlifting at the Olympics

Men's 105 kg at the Games of the XXVII Olympiad
- Venue: Sydney Convention and Exhibition Centre
- Date: 25 September 2000
- Competitors: 21 from 18 nations

Medalists
1st place, gold medalist(s)		Hossein Tavakkoli	Iran
2nd place, silver medalist(s)		Alan Tsagaev	Bulgaria
3rd place, bronze medalist(s)		Said Saif Asaad	Qatar

The men's 105 kilograms weightlifting event at the 2000 Summer Olympics in Sydney, Australia took place at the Sydney Convention and Exhibition Centre on September 25.

Total score was the sum of the lifter's best result in each of the snatch and the clean and jerk, with three lifts allowed for each lift. In case of a tie, the lighter lifter won; if still tied, the lifter who took the fewest attempts to achieve the total score won. Lifters without a valid snatch score did not perform the clean and jerk.

== Schedule ==
All times are Australian Eastern Time (UTC+10:00)

Date	Time	Event
25 September 2000	14:30	Group B
25 September 2000	18:30	Group A

== Records ==
Prior to this competition, the existing world and Olympic records were as follows.

World Record	Snatch	World Standard	197.0 kg	—	1 January 1998
World Record	Clean & Jerk	World Standard	242.5 kg	—	1 January 1998
World Record	Total	World Standard	440.0 kg	—	1 January 1998
Olympic Record	Snatch	Olympic Standard	192.5 kg	—	1 January 1997
Olympic Record	Clean & Jerk	Olympic Standard	235.0 kg	—	1 January 1997
Olympic Record	Total	Olympic Standard	427.5 kg	—	1 January 1997

== Results ==
Rank	Athlete	Group	Body weight	Snatch (kg)				Clean & Jerk (kg)				Total
Rank	Athlete	Group	Body weight	1	2	3	Result	1	2	3	Result	Total
1st place, gold medalist(s)	Hossein Tavakkoli (IRI)	A	104.70	190.0	~~195.0~~	~~195.0~~	190.0	230.0	~~235.0~~	235.0	235.0	425.0
2nd place, silver medalist(s)	Alan Tsagaev (BUL)	A	104.48	180.0	~~185.0~~	187.5	187.5	230.0	235.0	~~237.5~~	235.0	422.5
3rd place, bronze medalist(s)	Said Saif Asaad (QAT)	A	104.12	185.0	~~190.0~~	190.0	190.0	225.0	230.0	~~235.0~~	230.0	420.0
4	Ihor Razoronov (UKR)	A	104.52	~~192.5~~	192.5	~~195.0~~	192.5	227.5	~~232.5~~	~~232.5~~	227.5	420.0
5	Evgeny Chigishev (RUS)	A	104.38	180.0	187.5	190.0	190.0	217.5	225.0	~~230.0~~	225.0	415.0
6	Alexandru Bratan (MDA)	B	104.16	190.0	~~195.0~~	~~195.0~~	190.0	~~220.0~~	~~220.0~~	220.0	220.0	410.0
7	Florin Vlad (ROM)	B	102.72	175.0	180.0	~~185.0~~	180.0	215.0	220.0	225.0	225.0	405.0
8	Grzegorz Kleszcz (POL)	A	104.68	180.0	185.0	~~190.0~~	185.0	220.0	~~227.5~~	~~227.5~~	220.0	405.0
9	Mariusz Jędra (POL)	A	104.52	175.0	~~180.0~~	~~180.0~~	175.0	~~215.0~~	215.0	~~220.0~~	215.0	390.0
10	Boris Burov (ECU)	B	103.42	175.0	182.5	~~185.0~~	182.5	205.0	~~210.0~~	~~210.0~~	205.0	387.5
11	Ramūnas Vyšniauskas (LTU)	B	104.16	~~175.0~~	~~175.0~~	175.0	175.0	210.0	~~215.0~~	~~215.0~~	210.0	385.0
12	Moreno Boer (ITA)	B	104.92	~~165.0~~	165.0	~~172.5~~	165.0	200.0	~~210.0~~	~~210.0~~	200.0	365.0
13	Tevita Kofe Ngalu (TGA)	B	103.96	122.5	127.5	~~130.0~~	127.5	162.5	~~167.5~~	167.5	167.5	295.0
—	Anatoly Khrapaty (KAZ)	B	103.06	~~177.5~~	~~177.5~~	~~177.5~~	—	—	—	—	—	—
—	Abdulaziz Alpak (TUR)	B	103.14	165.0	175.0	~~180.0~~	175.0	~~210.0~~	~~210.0~~	~~210.0~~	—	—
—	Denys Hotfrid (UKR)	A	103.88	190.0	~~195.0~~	~~195.0~~	190.0	~~230.0~~	~~230.0~~	~~230.0~~	—	—
—	Choi Jong-kun (KOR)	A	104.38	~~180.0~~	~~180.0~~	~~180.0~~	—	—	—	—	—	—
—	Péter Tamton (HUN)	B	104.40	175.0	~~180.0~~	~~180.0~~	175.0	~~215.0~~	~~215.0~~	—	—	—
—	Thomas Yule (GBR)	B	104.46	~~155.0~~	~~155.0~~	~~155.0~~	—	—	—	—	—	—
—	Mukhran Gogia (GEO)	A	104.50	~~190.0~~	—	—	—	—	—	—	—	—
—	Evgeny Shishlyannikov (RUS)	A	104.86	187.5	~~192.5~~	~~192.5~~	187.5	~~215.0~~	—	—	—	—
