= Weightlifting at the 2002 Asian Games – Men's 105 kg =

Men's 105 kg at the 2002 Asian Games
- Venue: Pukyong National University Gymnasium
- Date: 9 October 2002
- Competitors: 9 from 8 nations

Medalists
gold medal	Said Saif Asaad	Qatar
silver medal	Cui Wenhua	China
bronze medal	Hossein Tavakkoli	Iran

The men's 105 kilograms event at the 2002 Asian Games took place on October 9, 2002 at Pukyong National University Gymnasium.

== Schedule ==
All times are Korea Standard Time (UTC+09:00)

Date	Time	Event
Wednesday, 9 October 2002	15:00	Group A

== Records ==
Prior to this competition, the existing world, Asian and Games records were as follows.

World Record	Snatch	Marcin Dołęga (POL)	198.5 kg	Havířov, Czech Republic	4 June 2002
World Record	Clean & Jerk	World Standard	242.5 kg	—	1 January 1998
World Record	Total	World Standard	440.0 kg	—	1 January 1998
Asian Record	Snatch	Cui Wenhua (CHN)	195.0 kg	Lahti, Finland	14 November 1998
Asian Record	Clean & Jerk	Hossein Tavakkoli (IRI)	235.0 kg	Sydney, Australia	25 September 2000
Asian Record	Total	Hossein Tavakkoli (IRI)	425.0 kg	Sydney, Australia	25 September 2000
Games Record	Snatch	Cui Wenhua (CHN)	195.0 kg	Bangkok, Thailand	13 December 1998
Games Record	Clean & Jerk	Anatoly Khrapaty (KAZ)	220.0 kg	Bangkok, Thailand	13 December 1998
Games Record	Total	Cui Wenhua (CHN)	410.0 kg	Bangkok, Thailand	13 December 1998

== Results ==
Rank	Athlete	Body weight	Snatch (kg)				Clean & Jerk (kg)				Total
Rank	Athlete	Body weight	1	2	3	Result	1	2	3	Result	Total
1st place, gold medalist(s)	Said Saif Asaad (QAT)	104.25	180.0	187.5	192.5	192.5	220.0	225.0	—	225.0	417.5
2nd place, silver medalist(s)	Cui Wenhua (CHN)	103.25	185.0	190.0	195.0	195.0	200.0	210.0	220.0	220.0	415.0
3rd place, bronze medalist(s)	Hossein Tavakkoli (IRI)	104.95	~~180.0~~	180.0	~~187.5~~	180.0	220.0	~~230.0~~	~~232.5~~	220.0	400.0
4	Choi Jong-kun (KOR)	104.35	175.0	~~180.0~~	180.0	180.0	205.0	212.5	~~220.0~~	212.5	392.5
5	Aleksandr Urinov (UZB)	100.70	~~180.0~~	180.0	~~185.0~~	180.0	202.5	210.0	~~220.0~~	210.0	390.0
6	Dmitriy Frolov (KAZ)	104.10	165.0	170.0	~~175.0~~	170.0	205.0	210.0	215.0	215.0	385.0
7	Lee Woo-sung (KOR)	104.75	~~170.0~~	~~170.0~~	170.0	170.0	210.0	215.0	~~220.0~~	215.0	385.0
8	Hisaya Yoshimoto (JPN)	104.75	170.0	~~177.5~~	~~177.5~~	170.0	~~200.0~~	~~200.0~~	200.0	200.0	370.0
9	Park Tok-kui (PRK)	104.25	120.0	125.0	130.0	130.0	155.0	162.5	170.0	170.0	300.0

== New records ==
The following records were established during the competition.

Clean & Jerk	225.0	Said Saif Asaad (QAT)	GR
Total	412.5	Said Saif Asaad (QAT)	GR
Total	415.0	Cui Wenhua (CHN)	GR
Total	417.5	Said Saif Asaad (QAT)	GR
