= Akos Sandor =

Canadian weightlifter (born 1977)

Personal information
- Nationality: Hungary (born); Canada
- Born: 11 December 1977 (age 48) Szombathely, Hungary
- Height: 180 cm (5 ft 11 in)
- Weight: 104.87 kg (231.2 lb)

Sport
- Country: Canada
- Sport: Weightlifting
- Weight class: 105 kg
- Club: Sabaria Weightlifting Club, Ontario
- Team: National team
Medal record
Representing Canada
Commonwealth Games
Gold medal – first place	1998 Kuala Lumpur	-105kg clean & jerk
Gold medal – first place	1998 Kuala Lumpur	-105kg snatch
Gold medal – first place	1998 Kuala Lumpur	-105kg total
Gold medal – first place	2006 Melbourne	-105kg
Silver medal – second place	2002 Manchester	-105kg clean & jerk
Silver medal – second place	2002 Manchester	-105kg snatch
Silver medal – second place	2002 Manchester	-105kg total
- Updated on 9 September 2016

Akos Sandor (born 11 December 1977 in Szombathely) is a Hungarian-born Canadian male weightlifter, competing in the 105 kg category and representing Canada at international competitions. He participated at the 2004 Summer Olympics in the 105 kg event. He competed at world championships, most recently at the 2007 World Weightlifting Championships.

== Major results ==
Year	Venue	Weight	Snatch (kg)				Clean & Jerk (kg)				Total	Rank
Year	Venue	Weight	1	2	3	Rank	1	2	3	Rank	Total	Rank
Summer Olympics
2004	Athens, Italy	105 kg				—N/a				—N/a		DNF
World Championships
2007	Chiang Mai, Thailand	105 kg	150	~~155~~	155	27	190	~~195~~	~~195~~	25	345	22
2006	Santo Domingo, Dominican Republic	105 kg	~~150~~	150	155	22	190	~~195~~	195	21	350.0	21
2005	Doha, Qatar	105 kg	~~155~~	155	160	13	~~190~~	~~190~~	190	14	350.0	11
2003	Vancouver, Canada	105 kg	165	~~170~~	170	22	200	205	~~210~~	20	375	18
2002	Warsaw, Poland	105 kg	150	~~155~~	155	19	190	195	~~200~~	19	350	19
2001	Antalya, Turkey	105 kg	160	~~165~~	165	20	195	~~200~~	200	20	365	18
1999	Piraeus, Greece	105 kg	165	~~170~~	~~170~~	22	---	---	---	---	0	---
1998	Lahti, Finland	105 kg	160	~~165~~	165	18	190	197.5	200	18	365	17
1997		99 kg										
