= Gurbinder Singh Cheema =

British weightlifter

Personal information
- Full name: Gurbinder Singh Cheema
- Nationality: United Kingdom
- Born: 14 November 1978 (age 47)
- Weight: 103.98 kg (229.2 lb)

Sport
- Country: Great Britain; England
- Sport: Weightlifting
- Weight class: 105 kg
- Team: National team
- Updated on 28 September 2016

Gurbinder Singh Cheema (born 14 November 1978) is a British male weightlifter, competing in the 105 kg category and representing Great Britain and England at international competitions. He competed at world championships, most recently at the 2001 World Weightlifting Championships. He represented England at the 2002, 2006 and 2010 Commonwealth Games.He won a bronze medal in the Snatch Lift in 2002 Commonwealth Games. Also won a gold medal in the 2005 Commonwealth Weightlifting Championships.

== Major results ==
Year	Venue	Weight	Snatch (kg)				Clean & Jerk (kg)				Total	Rank
Year	Venue	Weight	1	2	3	Rank	1	2	3	Rank	Total	Rank
World Championships
2001	Antalya, Turkey	105 kg	~~155~~	155	~~160~~	23	185	190	~~195~~	23	345	23
1999	Piraeus, Greece	+105 kg	145	~~150~~	150	35	185	~~190~~	190	36	340	34
