= Albert Abotsi =

Ghanaian weightlifter

Personal information
- Full name: Albert Kwame Mensah Abotsi
- Born: 20 June 1981 (age 45)
- Weight: 104.79 kg (231.0 lb)

Sport
- Country: Ghana
- Sport: Weightlifting
- Weight class: 105 kg
- Team: National team
- Updated on 7 September 2016

Albert Kwame Mensah Abotsi (born 20 June 1981) is a Ghanaian male weightlifter, competing in the 105 kg category and representing Ghana at international competitions. He competed at world championships, most recently at the 2009 World Weightlifting Championships.

== Major results ==
Year	Venue	Weight	Snatch (kg)				Clean & Jerk (kg)				Total	Rank
Year	Venue	Weight	1	2	3	Rank	1	2	3	Rank	Total	Rank
World Championships
2009	Goyang, South Korea	105 kg	115	117	120	18	150	~~155~~	156	18	276	18
