= Dmitry Lapikov =

Russian weightlifter (born 1982)

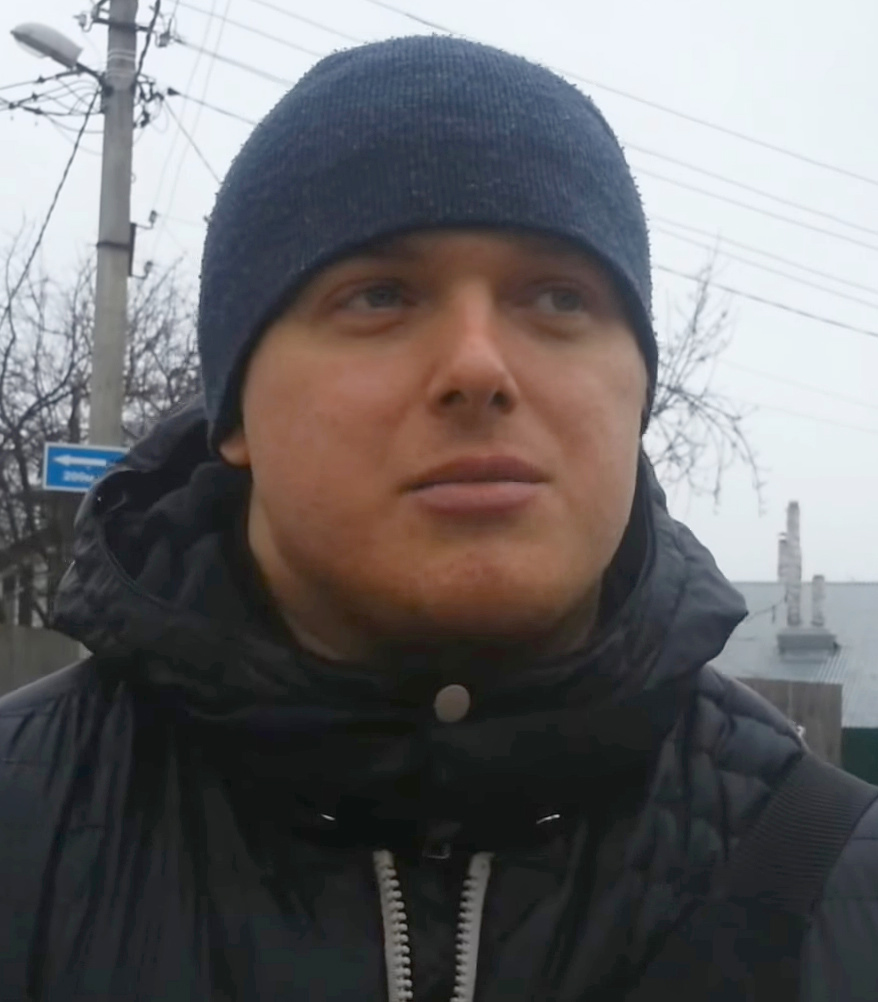
- Lapikov in February 2014

Personal information
- Full name: Dmitry Valentinovich Lapikov
- Nationality: Russian
- Born: June 4, 1982 (age 44) Kaliningrad
Medal record
Men's weightlifting
Representing Russia
Olympic Games
Disqualified	2008 Beijing	–105 kg
World Championships
Silver medal – second place	2006 Santo Domingo	– 105 kg
Disqualified	2009 Goyang	– 105 kg
European Championships
Bronze medal – third place	2007 Strasbourg	– 105 kg
Disqualified	2011 Kazan	+ 105 kg

Dmitry Valentinovich Lapikov (Russian: Дмитрий Валентинович Лапиков; born June 4, 1982, in Kaliningrad) is a former Russian weightlifter.

== Career ==
At the 2005 World Championships he ranked 4th, with a total of 408 kg. He won gold in the snatch, silver in the clean and jerk, and overall silver at the 2006 World Championships, with a total of 414 kg.

Lapikov originally won the bronze medal in the 105 kg event at the 2008 Beijing Olympics, with a total of 420 kg. In 2016, he was stripped of his medal after his sample tested positive for steroids.

Lapikov tested positive and was disqualified from the +105 kg event of the European Championship 2011. He originally won the +105 kg category with a 192 snatch, 227 clean and jerk, and 419 total.
