= Hossein Tavakkoli =

Iranian weightlifter (born 1978)

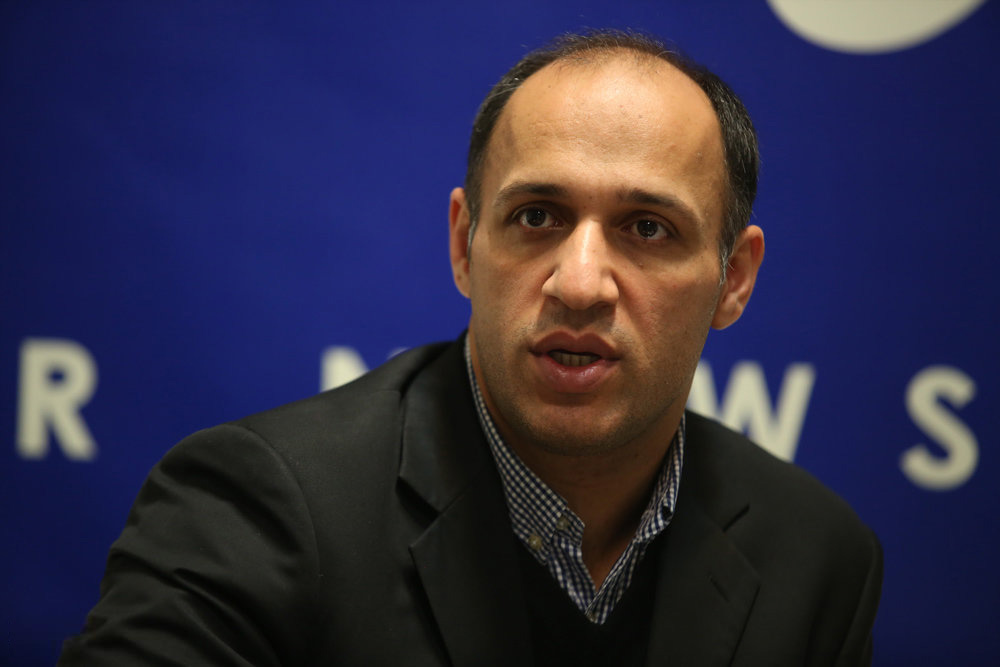
- Tavakkoli in 2019

Personal information
- Nationality: Iranian
- Born: January 10, 1978 (age 48) Mahmoudabad, Mazandaran, Iran

Sport
- Country: Iran
- Sport: weightlifter
Medal record
Men's weightlifting
Representing Iran
Olympic Games
Gold medal – first place	2000 Sydney	105 kg
Asian Games
Bronze medal – third place	2002 Busan	105 kg
Asian Championships
Gold medal – first place	1999 Wuhan	105 kg
Silver medal – second place	2004 Almaty	105 kg

Hossein Tavakkoli (Persian: حسین توکلی; born January 10, 1978) is an Iranian weightlifter who won the gold medal in the Men's 105 kg weight class at the 2000 Summer Olympics. In 2017, he start training Ehsan Hadadi, an olympic silver medalist in discus throwing, for 2020 Olympic Games preparation.

== Major result ==
Year	Venue	Weight	Snatch (kg)				Clean & jerk (kg)				Total	Rank
Year	Venue	Weight	1	2	3	Rank	1	2	3	Rank	Total	Rank
Olympic Games
2000	Sydney, Australia	105 kg	190	~~195~~	~~195~~	2	230	~~235~~	235	2	425	1st place, gold medalist(s)
World Championships
1999	Athens, Greece	105 kg	180	185	~~190~~	8	215	222.5	~~227.5~~	5	407.5	5
2001	Antalya, Turkey	105 kg	185	~~190~~	~~190~~	9	~~220~~	~~220~~	~~220~~	--	--	--
2002	Warsaw, Poland	105 kg	185	~~190~~	~~190~~	7	222.5	230	~~235~~	4	415	5
Asian Games
1998	Bangkok, Thailand	105 kg	175			5	215			5	390	5
2002	Busan, South Korea	105 kg	~~180~~	180	~~187.5~~	5	220	~~230~~	~~232.5~~	3	400	3rd place, bronze medalist(s)
Asian Championships
1999	Wuhan, China	105 kg	175			2nd place, silver medalist(s)	225.5			1st place, gold medalist(s)	400.5	1st place, gold medalist(s)
2004	Almaty, Kazakhstan	105 kg	180			1st place, gold medalist(s)	210			2nd place, silver medalist(s)	390	2nd place, silver medalist(s)
World Junior Championships
1997	Cape Town, South Africa	99 kg	140	~~150~~	~~150~~	6	165	170	180	5	320	6
1998	Sofia, Bulgaria	105 kg	~~160~~	~~160~~	~~160~~	--	185	192.5	~~197.5~~	5	--	--
