= Oleksiy Torokhtiy =

Ukrainian weightlifter (born 1986)

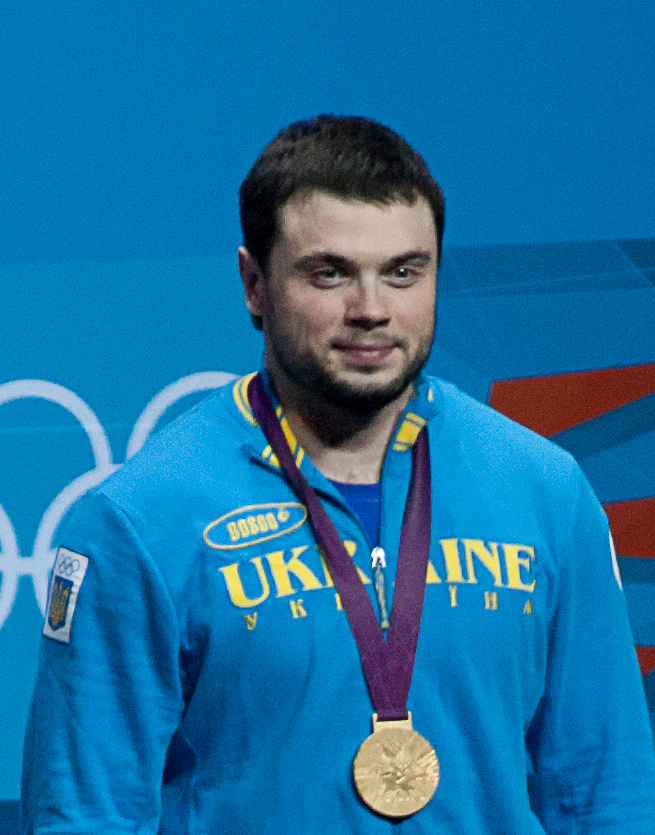
- Torokhtiy in 2012

Personal information
- Nationality: Ukrainian
- Born: May 22, 1986 (age 40) Zuhres, Ukrainian SSR, Soviet Union
- Education: NAU "KhAI"
- Height: 1.81 m (5 ft 11 in) (2012)
- Weight: 104 kg (229 lb) (2012)
- Website: www.torokhtiy.com

Sport
- Country: Ukraine
- Sport: Weightlifting
- Event: 105 kg
- Coached by: Valery Nikulin, Mikhail Matsokha
Medal record
Men's weightlifting
Representing Ukraine
Olympic Games
Disqualified	2012 London	– 105 kg
World Championships
Bronze medal – third place	2009 Goyang	– 105 kg
Bronze medal – third place	2011 Paris	– 105 kg
European Championships
Silver medal – second place	2009 Bucharest	– 105 kg
Bronze medal – third place	2010 Minsk	– 105 kg
- Updated on 7 August 2012

Oleksiy Pavlovych Torokhtiy (Ukrainian: Олексій Павлович Торохтій; born May 22, 1986, in Zuhres) is a Ukrainian weightlifter, an Olympic Gold Medalist in weightlifting (London 2012) until disqualified for a doping offence, winner of World and European Championships. Participant of two Olympic Games (2008, 2012). Oleksiy was also a Member of European Weightlifting Federation Executive Committee, Deputy Chairman of Ukrainian National Olympic Commіttee Athletes Commission and the Vice-President of the Weightlifting Federation of Ukraine (2016-2020).

Currently, Oleksiy actively holds master classes and seminars on weightlifting all over the world. Oleksiy is the founder of international sportswear and accessories brand "Warm Body Cold Mind". Oleksiy is an author and creator of a series of training programs and nutrition sets called TORWOD.

Oleksiy is one of the biggest social media influencers in weightlifting, with more than half a million Instagram followers. He is famous for his free training videos on his YouTube channel. In 2019, he was awarded with YouTube Silver Play Button for more than 100,000 subscribers and currently has over 280,000 subscribers.

== Biography ==
Torokhtiy was born on May 22, 1986, in Zugres, Donetsk Oblast, Ukraine.

In 2003 he graduated from Kharkiv Regional Higher School of Physical Culture with a degree in Physical Education.

In 2010 he graduated from Kharkiv Aviation Institute with a degree in "control system for flying machines and complexes" and was certified as an engineer.

In 2013, he launched his YouTube channel and became popular for his free training videos. Later he made video collaborations for his channel with world famous athletes including Oleksandr Usyk, Noah Ohlsen, Ruslan Nurudinov, Rebeka Koha, Zhan Belenyuk, Levan Saginashvili, Aleksandar Rakic, Dmyto Chumak, Oleksiy Novikov, Yaroslav Amosov.

In 2014 he received a second degree in Zaporizhzhya National University, specializing in physical education and sports / weightlifting coach.

In 2016, he founded the international brand of sportswear and accessories "Warm Body Cold Mind" (WBCM). It became famous for its slogan on t-shirts. "The (WBCM) shirt made its debut in (famous American baseball player Bryce Harper) his first media address in Florida, and was casually noted by the Washington Post, ESPN, Yahoo! Sports and more, who failed to grasp what it means". Now his brand is selling online all over the world. Since 2019 “Warm Body Cold Mind” collaborated with world-famous weightlifters as Rebeka Koha, Mohamed Ehab and Ruslan Nurudinov.

In 2020, Oleksiy released his eBook titled “The Snatch MasterClass: Olympic Weightlifting Course for Athletes & Coaches“. That same year, he entered the National University of Ukraine on Physical Education and Sport to obtain a Ph.D. in Sports Science. In 2025, he completed his Ph.D. in Sports Science, with a doctoral thesis titled “Programming classes for learning weightlifting exercises technique by athletes having different levels of physical fitness”. Oleksiy based his second eBook, “The Olympic Clean MasterClass“ on his Ph.D. research. In 2026, he released his third course, “The Jerk MasterClass“, continuing his series of Olympic weightlifting educational resources.

== Personal life ==
Oleksiy Torokhtiy is married to Daria who works as a guitar teacher. Oleksiy and Daria have a son Myron (2015).

== Sports career ==
Oleksiy started weightlifting in 2000. In 2005 he joined the Ukrainian national Olympic weightlifting team.

In 2006, at the European Junior Championships, he became a bronze medalist in the snatch and clean & jerk.

In 2007 he became the winner of the World Weightlifting Cup in Apia.

In 2008, he became a participant of the XXIX Olympic Games in Beijing, where he became one of the 10 strongest athletes in the category of up to 105 kg. Due to a lack of financial support, he had to retire from competitive Olympic Weightlifting right after the Olympic Games 2008 in Beijing. 5 months after his retirement, he got a sponsor, that allowed him to continue with his professional career.

In 2009 he won the gold in clean & jerk and became a silver medalist in European Championships in Bucharest (405 kg).

In 2010, he received the silver in clean & jerk and became the bronze medalist of the European Weightlifting Championships in Minsk.

In 2011 in Paris, Oleksiy Torokhtiy became the bronze medalist of the World Championship.

On August 6, 2012, in London Oleksiy became the Olympic Gold Medalist in weightlifting in the category 105 kg.

On 22 December 2018, it was announced that as a consequence of the International Olympic Committee’s re-analysis program in connection with the 2012 London Olympic Games Oleksiy had tested positive for performance-enhancing drugs. and in December 2019 it was confirmed that he had been disqualified.

== Major results ==
Year	Venue	Weight	Snatch (kg)				Clean & Jerk (kg)				Total	Rank
Year	Venue	Weight	1	2	3	Rank	1	2	3	Rank	Total	Rank
Olympic Games
2008	Beijing, China	105 kg	172	177	~~181~~	9	213	~~220~~	~~220~~	10	390	10
2012	(United Kingdom) London, England	105 kg	185	~~190~~	~~190~~	2	222	~~226~~	227	1	412	DQ
World Championships
2006	Santo Domingo, Dominican Republic	105 kg	~~160~~	160	165	17	200	205	208	13	373	12
2007	Chiang Mai, Thailand	105 kg	~~167~~	~~167~~	~~167~~	--	--	--	--	--	--	--
2009	Goyang, South Korea	105 kg	176	180	~~183~~	5	215	~~221~~	~~221~~	5	395	3rd place, bronze medalist(s)
2011	Paris, France	105 kg	176	181	~~185~~	5	220	~~229~~	229	3rd place, bronze medalist(s)	410	3rd place, bronze medalist(s)
European Championships
2008	Lignano Sabbiadoro, Italy	105 kg	~~170~~	170	175	6	210	~~217~~	220	2nd place, silver medalist(s)	395	5
2009	Bucharest, Romania	105 kg	172	177	181	4	213	~~220~~	224	1st place, gold medalist(s)	405	2nd place, silver medalist(s)
2010	Minsk, Belarus	105 kg	175	~~180~~	~~180~~	7	217	221	~~225~~	2nd place, silver medalist(s)	396	3rd place, bronze medalist(s)
2011	Kazan, Russia	105 kg	170	~~175~~	~~175~~	11	~~215~~	215	~~218~~	3rd place, bronze medalist(s)	385	5

== Books ==
- The Snatch MasterClass: Olympic Weightlifting Course for Athletes & Coaches (2020).
- The Olympic Clean MasterClass (2021).
