= Weightlifting at the 1998 Asian Games – Men's 105 kg =

Men's 105 kg at the 1998 Asian Games
- Venue: Thunder Dome
- Date: 13 December 1998
- Competitors: 9 from 7 nations

Medalists
gold medal	Cui Wenhua	China
silver medal	Anatoly Khrapaty	Kazakhstan
bronze medal	Choi Jong-kun	South Korea

The men's 105 kilograms event at the 1998 Asian Games took place on 13 December 1998 at Thunder Dome, Maung Thong Thani Sports Complex.

The weightlifter from China won the gold, with a combined lift of 410 kg.

Total score was the sum of the lifter's best result in each of the snatch and the clean and jerk, with three lifts allowed for each lift. In case of a tie, the lighter lifter won; if still tied, the lifter who took the fewest attempts to achieve the total score won. Lifters without a valid snatch score were allowed to perform the clean and jerk.

== Results ==
Legend

- NM — No mark

Rank	Athlete	Body weight	Snatch (kg)				Clean & Jerk (kg)				Total
Rank	Athlete	Body weight	1	2	3	Result	1	2	3	Result	Total
1st place, gold medalist(s)	Cui Wenhua (CHN)	101.60	~~190.0~~	190.0	195.0	195.0	~~215.0~~	215.0	~~220.0~~	215.0	410.0
2nd place, silver medalist(s)	Anatoly Khrapaty (KAZ)	103.20	182.5	~~187.5~~	187.5	187.5	220.0	~~225.0~~	~~225.0~~	220.0	407.5
3rd place, bronze medalist(s)	Choi Jong-kun (KOR)	104.00	180.0	185.0	~~187.5~~	185.0	215.0	~~220.0~~	220.0	220.0	405.0
4	Sergey Kopytov (KAZ)	103.65	175.0	~~180.0~~	180.0	180.0	210.0	220.0	~~225.0~~	220.0	400.0
5	Hossein Tavakkoli (IRI)	104.40	165.0	170.0	175.0	175.0	210.0	215.0	~~223.0~~	215.0	390.0
6	Kamal Mousavi (IRI)	103.05	~~170.0~~	~~170.0~~	170.0	170.0	200.0	205.0	~~210.0~~	205.0	375.0
7	Hisaya Yoshimoto (JPN)	104.75	165.0	170.0	~~172.5~~	170.0	~~202.5~~	202.5	~~207.5~~	202.5	372.5
8	Hassanain Sheikh (SYR)	104.20	~~150.0~~	155.0	~~157.5~~	155.0	~~195.0~~	195.0	~~202.5~~	195.0	350.0
—	Ramon Solis (PHI)	97.35	~~140.0~~	~~140.0~~	~~140.0~~	—	—	—	—	—	NM
