= Weightlifting at the 2002 Asian Games – Men's 94 kg =

Men's 94 kg at the 2002 Asian Games
- Venue: Pukyong National University Gymnasium
- Date: 8 October 2002
- Competitors: 6 from 5 nations

Medalists
| gold medal | Bakhyt Akhmetov | Kazakhstan |
| silver medal | Kourosh Bagheri | Iran |
| bronze medal | Lee Ung-jo | South Korea |

The men's 94 kilograms event at the 2002 Asian Games took place on October 8, 2002 at Pukyong National University Gymnasium.

== Schedule ==
All times are Korea Standard Time (UTC+09:00)

| Date | Time | Event |
|---|---|---|
| Tuesday, 8 October 2002 | 18:00 | Group A |

== Records ==
Prior to this competition, the existing world, Asian and Games records were as follows.

| World Record | Snatch | Akakios Kakiasvilis (GRE) | 188.0 kg | Athens, Greece | 27 November 1999 |
| World Record | Clean & Jerk | Szymon Kołecki (POL) | 232.5 kg | Sofia, Bulgaria | 29 April 2000 |
| World Record | Total | World Standard | 417.5 kg | — | 1 January 1998 |
| Asian Record | Snatch | Kourosh Bagheri (IRI) | 187.5 kg | Sydney, Australia | 24 September 2000 |
| Asian Record | Clean & Jerk | Kourosh Bagheri (IRI) | 222.5 kg | Antalya, Turkey | 9 November 2001 |
| Asian Record | Total | Kourosh Bagheri (IRI) | 407.5 kg | Antalya, Turkey | 9 November 2001 |
| Games Record | Snatch | Andrey Makarov (KAZ) | 180.0 kg | Bangkok, Thailand | 12 December 1998 |
| Games Record | Clean & Jerk | Chun Yong-sung (KOR) | 210.0 kg | Bangkok, Thailand | 12 December 1998 |
| Games Record | Total | Andrey Makarov (KAZ) | 385.0 kg | Bangkok, Thailand | 12 December 1998 |

== Results ==
| Rank | Athlete | Body weight | Snatch (kg) | | | | Clean & Jerk (kg) | | | | Total |
| Rank | Athlete | Body weight | 1 | 2 | 3 | Result | 1 | 2 | 3 | Result | Total |
|---|---|---|---|---|---|---|---|---|---|---|---|
| 1st place, gold medalist(s) | Bakhyt Akhmetov (KAZ) | 93.25 | 180.0 | 185.0 | ~~188.5~~ | 185.0 | 205.0 | 210.0 | 215.0 | 215.0 | 400.0 |
| 2nd place, silver medalist(s) | Kourosh Bagheri (IRI) | 93.05 | ~~175.0~~ | 175.0 | ~~180.0~~ | 175.0 | 210.0 | ~~225.0~~ | — | 210.0 | 385.0 |
| 3rd place, bronze medalist(s) | Lee Ung-jo (KOR) | 93.50 | 160.0 | 167.5 | 170.0 | 170.0 | 195.0 | 200.0 | ~~210.0~~ | 200.0 | 370.0 |
| 4 | Andrey Makarov (KAZ) | 93.15 | 165.0 | 172.5 | 177.5 | 177.5 | 190.0 | ~~195.0~~ | ~~195.0~~ | 190.0 | 367.5 |
| 5 | Fazilbek Urazimbetov (UZB) | 93.20 | 145.0 | ~~150.0~~ | 150.0 | 150.0 | 180.0 | 185.0 | 190.0 | 190.0 | 340.0 |
| 6 | Hassan Aslam (PAK) | 91.05 | 140.0 | ~~150.0~~ | ~~150.0~~ | 140.0 | 170.0 | ~~180.0~~ | — | 170.0 | 310.0 |

== New records ==
The following records were established during the competition.

| Snatch | 185.0 | Bakhyt Akhmetov (KAZ) | GR |
| Clean & Jerk | 215.0 | Bakhyt Akhmetov (KAZ) | GR |
| Total | 390.0 | Bakhyt Akhmetov (KAZ) | GR |
| Total | 395.0 | Bakhyt Akhmetov (KAZ) | GR |
| Total | 400.0 | Bakhyt Akhmetov (KAZ) | GR |
