= Albert Kuzilov =

Georgian weightlifter

Personal information
- Nationality: Georgia
- Born: 5 February 1985 (age 41)
- Height: 1.79 m (5 ft 10 in)
- Weight: 105 kg (231 lb)

Sport
- Sport: Weightlifting
- Event: 105 kg

Albert Kuzilov (Georgian: ალბერტ კუზილოვი; born February 5, 1985) is a Georgian weightlifter. He won a bronze medal for the 105 kg class at the 2009 World Weightlifting Championships in Goyang, South Korea, with a total of 408 kg. In early 2010, Kuzilov ordered a two-year disqualification from the International Weightlifting Federation (IWF), after he tested positive for an anabolic steroid metandienon.

Kuzilov represented Georgia at the 2008 Summer Olympics in Beijing, where he competed for the men's heavyweight category (105 kg). Kuzilov placed seventh in this event, as he successfully lifted 182 kg in the single-motion snatch, and hoisted 227 kg in the two-part, shoulder-to-overhead clean and jerk, for a total of 409 kg. Kuzilov was later elevated to a higher position, when Ukraine's Ihor Razoronov had been disqualified from the Olympics, after he tested positive for nandrolone.
