= Dmitry Klokov =

Russian weightlifter (born 1983)

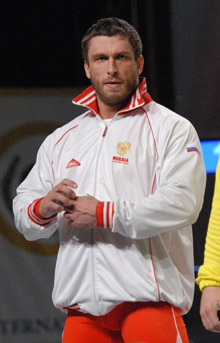
- Klokov in November 2011

Personal information
- Full name: Dmitriy Vyacheslavovich Klokov
- Nationality: Russian
- Born: February 18, 1983 (age 43) Balashikha, Moscow Oblast, Russian SFSR, Soviet Union
- Height: 1.83 m (6 ft 0 in)
- Weight: 105 kg (231 lb)
- Spouse: Elena Klokova (m. 2006)

Sport
- Country: Russia
- Sport: Weightlifting
- Event: 105 kg
- Turned pro: 2004
- Coached by: Alexander Venkov
- Retired: 2015

Achievements and titles
- Personal bests: Snatch: 196 kg (2011); Clean & Jerk: 232 kg (2011); Total: 428 kg (2011)
Medal record
Olympic Games
Silver medal – second place	2008 Beijing	– 105 kg
World Championships Total
Gold medal – first place	2005 Doha	– 105 kg
Silver medal – second place	2010 Antalya	– 105 kg
Silver medal – second place	2011 Paris	– 105 kg
Bronze medal – third place	2006 Santo Domingo	– 105 kg
Bronze medal – third place	2007 Chiang Mai	– 105 kg
European Championships Total
Gold medal – first place	2010 Minsk	– 105 kg

Dmitriy Vyacheslavovich Klokov (Russian: Дмитрий Вячеславович Клоков; born February 18, 1983) is a Russian former Olympic weightlifter, and World and European Champion. He competed in the 105 kg category.

== Biography ==
Klokov was born in Balashikha, the son of Vyacheslav Klokov, who was a world champion in the heavyweight category.

Klokov became world champion at the 2005 World Championships, with a total of 419 kg. He also participated in the 2005 and 2006 Arnold Sports Festivals in Columbus, Ohio. At the 2006 World Championships and 2007 World Championships he ranked 3rd.

Klokov won the silver medal at the 2008 Summer Olympics, with a total of 423 kg. He won the silver medal at the 2011 World Weightlifting Championships, with a 196 kg snatch, 232 kg clean and jerk for a total of 428 kg at a body weight of 104.6 kg. He lost to a fellow Russian, Khadzhimurat Akkayev by 2 kilos (on the snatch). Klokov was scheduled to compete at the 2012 Summer Olympics in the 105 kg class but was forced to withdraw due to undisclosed medical reasons.

In May 2015, Klokov announced his retirement from international competition. He later signed with the Baltimore Anthem of the National Pro Grid League.

In 2020, Klokov received retrospective doping charges from the International Testing Agency, for historic doping offences during his competitive weightlifting career.

== Personal life ==
Klokov and his wife, Elena Klokova, have a daughter named Anastasia.

== Major results ==
Year	Venue	Weight	Snatch (kg)				Clean & Jerk (kg)				Total	Rank
Year	Venue	Weight	1	2	3	Rank	1	2	3	Rank	Total	Rank
Olympic Games
2008	Beijing, China	105 kg	185	190	193	3	222	226	230	2	423	2nd place, silver medalist(s)
World Championships
2005	Doha, Qatar	105 kg	186	190	192	1st place, gold medalist(s)	222	227	—	1st place, gold medalist(s)	419	1st place, gold medalist(s)
2006	(Dominican Republic) Santo Domingo, Dominican Rep	105 kg	180	185	188	3rd place, bronze medalist(s)	218	~~227~~	~~227~~	4	406	3rd place, bronze medalist(s)
2007	Chiang Mai, Thailand	105 kg	185	~~189~~	190	4	221	~~234~~	~~234~~	5	411	3rd place, bronze medalist(s)
2010	Antalya, Turkey	105 kg	185	190	192	1st place, gold medalist(s)	218	223	~~227~~	2nd place, silver medalist(s)	415	2nd place, silver medalist(s)
2011	Paris, France	105 kg	187	192	196	2nd place, silver medalist(s)	220	225	232	2nd place, silver medalist(s)	428	2nd place, silver medalist(s)
European Championships
2010	Minsk, Belarus	105 kg	185	~~190~~	~~190~~	2nd place, silver medalist(s)	217	224	—	1st place, gold medalist(s)	409	1st place, gold medalist(s)
