= Vladimir Smorchkov =

Russian weightlifter (born 1980)

Personal information
- Nationality: Russia
- Born: 25 January 1980 (age 46)
- Weight: 103.87 kg (229.0 lb)

Sport
- Country: Russia
- Sport: Weightlifting
- Event: –105 kg
Medal record
World Championships
Gold medal – first place	2001 Antalya	– 105 kg
Silver medal – second place	2003 Vancouver	– 105 kg
Bronze medal – third place	2002 Warsaw	– 105 kg
Bronze medal – third place	2010 Antalya	– 105 kg
European Championships
Gold medal – first place	2005 Sofia	– 105 kg
Gold medal – first place	2009 Bucharest	– 105 kg
Silver medal – second place	2006 Władysławowo	– 105 kg
Bronze medal – third place	2003 Loutraki	– 105 kg

Vladimir Smorchkov (Russian: Владимир Сморчков; born January 25, 1980) is a Russian weightlifter, and former World Champion competing in the 105 kg category.

== Career ==
At the 2001 World Weightlifting Championships he exceeded the world standard in the snatch and set a new World Record of 198 kg. His lead was so large after the snatch portion, that even after finishing fourth in the clean and jerk he still won the gold medal in the total.

In 2002 at the World Championships he competed in the B group, after snatching 197.5 kg (which would be the gold medal snatch by 5 kg) he placed tenth in the clean and jerk with 220.0 kg. Similar to 2001, his snatch lead was so large that he still received a bronze medal in the total.

In 2006 he was banned for two years for failing a doping test.

== Major results ==
Year	Venue	Weight	Snatch (kg)				Clean & Jerk (kg)				Total	Rank
Year	Venue	Weight	1	2	3	Rank	1	2	3	Rank	Total	Rank
World Championships
2001	Antalya, Turkey	105 kg	190.0	195.0	198.0 WR	1st place, gold medalist(s)	220.0	225.0	~~230.0~~	4	422.5	1st place, gold medalist(s)
2002	Warsaw, Poland	105 kg	190.0	197.5	~~200.0~~	1st place, gold medalist(s)	220.0	~~227.5~~	~~227.5~~	10	417.5	3rd place, bronze medalist(s)
2003	Vancouver, Canada	105 kg	190.0	~~195.0~~	195.0	1st place, gold medalist(s)	~~222.5~~	222.5	~~225.0~~	5	417.5	2nd place, silver medalist(s)
2010	Antalya, Turkey	105 kg	190.0	~~193~~	~~195~~	2nd place, silver medalist(s)	215	220	~~225~~	5	410	3rd place, bronze medalist(s)
