= Angelos Ioannou =

Cypriot weightlifter (born 1972)

Personal information
- Full name: Angelos Ioannou
- Born: 1 January 1972 (age 54)
- Weight: 101.45 kg (223.7 lb)

Sport
- Country: Cyprus
- Sport: Weightlifting
- Weight class: 105 kg
- Team: National team
- Updated on 26 September 2016

Angelos Ioannou (born 1 January 1972) is a Cypriot male weightlifter, competing in the 105 kg category and representing Cyprus at international competitions. He competed at world championships, most recently at the 2002 World Weightlifting Championships.

== Major results ==
Year	Venue	Weight	Snatch (kg)				Clean & Jerk (kg)				Total	Rank
Year	Venue	Weight	1	2	3	Rank	1	2	3	Rank	Total	Rank
World Championships
2002	Warsaw, Poland	105 kg	~~130~~	~~130~~	~~132.5~~	---	~~155~~	---	---	---	0	---
1999	Piraeus, Greece	105 kg	110	~~120~~	120	33	~~140~~	---	---	---	0	---
