= 2009 World Weightlifting Championships =

International weightlifting competition

2009 World Championships
- Host city: Goyang, South Korea
- Dates: 20–29 November
- Main venue: KINTEX

The World Weightlifting Championships 2009 was held in Goyang, South Korea. The event took place from November 20 to November 29, 2009.

== Medal summary ==
=== Men ===
Event	Gold		Silver		Bronze	
56 kg
Snatch	Wu Jingbiao; China	131 kg	Long Qingquan; China	130 kg	Khalil El-Maaoui; Tunisia	125 kg
Clean & Jerk	Long Qingquan; China	162 kg	Wu Jingbiao; China	155 kg	Sergio Álvarez; Cuba	154 kg
Total	Long Qingquan; China	292 kg	Wu Jingbiao; China	286 kg	Sergio Álvarez; Cuba	274 kg
62 kg
Snatch	Ding Jianjun; China	146 kg	Yang Fan; China	144 kg	Eko Yuli Irawan; Indonesia	140 kg
Clean & Jerk	Eko Yuli Irawan; Indonesia	175 kg	Yang Sheng-hsiung; Chinese Taipei	170 kg	Yang Fan; China	170 kg
Total	Ding Jianjun; China	316 kg	Eko Yuli Irawan; Indonesia	315 kg	Yang Fan; China	314 kg
69 kg
Snatch	Liao Hui; China	160 kg	Ninel Miculescu; Romania	155 kg	Arakel Mirzoyan; Armenia	154 kg
Clean & Jerk	Liao Hui; China	186 kg	Kim Sun-bae; South Korea	181 kg	Triyatno; Indonesia	180 kg
Total	Liao Hui; China	346 kg	Arakel Mirzoyan; Armenia	334 kg	Triyatno; Indonesia	330 kg
77 kg
Snatch	Lü Xiaojun; China	174 kg WR	Tigran Martirosyan; Armenia	170 kg	Su Dajin; China	165 kg
Clean & Jerk	Sa Jae-hyouk; South Korea	205 kg	Lü Xiaojun; China	204 kg	Su Dajin; China	200 kg
Total	Lü Xiaojun; China	378 kg WR	Tigran Martirosyan; Armenia	370 kg	Su Dajin; China	365 kg
85 kg
Snatch	Lu Yong; China	175 kg	Tigran Martirosyan; Armenia	172 kg	Siarhei Lahun; Belarus	171 kg
Clean & Jerk	Siarhei Lahun; Belarus	209 kg	Lu Yong; China	208 kg	Gevorik Poghosyan; Armenia	208 kg
Total	Lu Yong; China	383 kg	Siarhei Lahun; Belarus	380 kg	Vladimir Kuznetsov; Kazakhstan	376 kg
94 kg
Snatch	Artem Ivanov; Ukraine	180 kg	Kim Min-jae; South Korea	178 kg	Asghar Ebrahimi; Iran	176 kg
Clean & Jerk	Kim Seon-jong; South Korea	218 kg	Valeriu Calancea; Romania	211 kg	Anatolie Cîrîcu; Moldova	210 kg
Total	Kim Min-jae; South Korea	384 kg	Kim Seon-jong; South Korea	383 kg	Andrey Demanov; Russia	381 kg
105 kg
Snatch	Marcin Dołęga; Poland	195 kg	Kim Hwa-seung; South Korea	182 kg	Roman Konstantinov; Russia	180 kg
Clean & Jerk	Marcin Dołęga; Poland	226 kg	Roman Konstantinov; Russia	220 kg	Ahed Joughili; Syria	218 kg
Total	Marcin Dołęga; Poland	421 kg	Roman Konstantinov; Russia	400 kg	Oleksiy Torokhtiy; Ukraine	395 kg
+105 kg
Snatch	Ihor Shymechko; Ukraine	202 kg	Artem Udachyn; Ukraine	200 kg	An Yong-kwon; South Korea	198 kg
Clean & Jerk	An Yong-kwon; South Korea	247 kg	Artem Udachyn; Ukraine	245 kg	Andrey Kozlov; Russia	231 kg
Total	An Yong-kwon; South Korea	445 kg	Artem Udachyn; Ukraine	445 kg	Ihor Shymechko; Ukraine	427 kg

=== Women ===
Event	Gold		Silver		Bronze	
48 kg
Snatch	Wang Mingjuan; China	93 kg	Sibel Özkan; Turkey	89 kg	Pensiri Laosirikul; Thailand	85 kg
Clean & Jerk	Sibel Özkan; Turkey	117 kg	Wang Mingjuan; China	115 kg	Chen Wei-ling; Chinese Taipei	112 kg
Total	Wang Mingjuan; China	208 kg	Sibel Özkan; Turkey	206 kg	Chen Wei-ling; Chinese Taipei	196 kg
53 kg
Snatch	Chen Xiaoting; China	95 kg	Yoon Jin-hee; South Korea	93 kg	Svetlana Cheremshanova; Kazakhstan	92 kg
Clean & Jerk	Zulfiya Chinshanlo; Kazakhstan	129 kg	Chen Xiaoting; China	123 kg	Yoon Jin-hee; South Korea	116 kg
Total	Zulfiya Chinshanlo; Kazakhstan	219 kg	Chen Xiaoting; China	218 kg	Yoon Jin-hee; South Korea	209 kg
58 kg
Snatch	Li Xueying; China	107 kg	Nastassia Novikava; Belarus	100 kg	Yuliya Kalina; Ukraine	96 kg
Clean & Jerk	Li Xueying; China	132 kg	Nastassia Novikava; Belarus	125 kg	Yuliya Kalina; Ukraine	119 kg
Total	Li Xueying; China	239 kg	Nastassia Novikava; Belarus	225 kg	Yuliya Kalina; Ukraine	215 kg
63 kg
Snatch	Viktoria Savenko; Russia	112 kg	Hanna Batsiushka; Belarus	112 kg	Svetlana Tsarukaeva; Russia	111 kg
Clean & Jerk	Maiya Maneza; Kazakhstan	141 kg	Sibel Şimşek; Turkey	135 kg	Guo Xiyan; China	135 kg
Total	Maiya Maneza; Kazakhstan	246 kg	Svetlana Tsarukaeva; Russia	246 kg	Sibel Şimşek; Turkey	243 kg
69 kg
Snatch	Nazik Avdalyan; Armenia	119 kg	Oxana Slivenko; Russia	118 kg	Zhang Shaoling; Macau	112 kg
Clean & Jerk	Nazik Avdalyan; Armenia	147 kg	Oxana Slivenko; Russia	146 kg	Zhang Shaoling; Macau	136 kg
Total	Nazik Avdalyan; Armenia	266 kg	Oxana Slivenko; Russia	264 kg	Zhang Shaoling; Macau	248 kg
75 kg
Snatch	Svetlana Podobedova; Kazakhstan	132 kg WR	Cao Lei; China	121 kg	Lydia Valentín; Spain	118 kg
Clean & Jerk	Svetlana Podobedova; Kazakhstan	160 kg WR	Cao Lei; China	148 kg	Abeer Abdelrahman; Egypt	142 kg
Total	Svetlana Podobedova; Kazakhstan	292 kg WR	Cao Lei; China	269 kg	Abeer Abdelrahman; Egypt	252 kg
+75 kg
Snatch	Tatiana Kashirina; Russia	138 kg	Jang Mi-ran; South Korea	136 kg	Meng Suping; China	131 kg
Clean & Jerk	Jang Mi-ran; South Korea	187 kg WR	Tatiana Kashirina; Russia	165 kg	Meng Suping; China	165 kg
Total	Jang Mi-ran; South Korea	323 kg	Tatiana Kashirina; Russia	303 kg	Meng Suping; China	296 kg

== Medal table ==
Ranking by Big (Total result) medals

Rank	Nation	Gold	Silver	Bronze	Total
1	China	7	3	3	13
2	South Korea	3	1	1	5
3	Kazakhstan	3	0	1	4
4	Armenia	1	2	0	3
5	Poland	1	0	0	1
6	Russia	0	4	1	5
7	Belarus	0	2	0	2
8	Ukraine	0	1	3	4
9	Indonesia	0	1	1	2
9	Turkey	0	1	1	2
11	Chinese Taipei	0	0	1	1
11	Cuba	0	0	1	1
11	Egypt	0	0	1	1
11	Macau	0	0	1	1
Totals (14 entries)		15	15	15	45

Ranking by all medals: Big (Total result) and Small (Snatch and Clean & Jerk)

Rank	Nation	Gold	Silver	Bronze	Total
1	China	18	12	9	39
2	South Korea	7	6	3	16
3	Kazakhstan	7	0	2	9
4	Armenia	3	4	2	9
5	Poland	3	0	0	3
6	Russia	2	8	4	14
7	Ukraine	2	3	5	10
8	Belarus	1	5	1	7
9	Turkey	1	3	1	5
10	Indonesia	1	1	3	5
11	Romania	0	2	0	2
12	Chinese Taipei	0	1	2	3
13	Macau	0	0	3	3
14	Cuba	0	0	2	2
14	Egypt	0	0	2	2
16	Iran	0	0	1	1
16	Moldova	0	0	1	1
16	Spain	0	0	1	1
16	Syria	0	0	1	1
16	Thailand	0	0	1	1
16	Tunisia	0	0	1	1
Totals (21 entries)		45	45	45	135

== Team ranking ==
=== Men ===
Rank	Team	Points
1	China	623
2	South Korea	517
3	~~Azerbaijan~~	369
4	Cuba	353
5	Ukraine	346
6	Russia	328

=== Women ===
Rank	Team	Points
1	China	514
2	South Korea	432
3	~~Turkey~~	408
4	Russia	398
5	Kazakhstan	388
6	Mexico	273

== Participating nations ==
329 competitors from 65 nations competed.

- Albania (3)
- Armenia (7)
- Australia (4)
- Azerbaijan (7)
- Belarus (6)
- Belgium (1)
- Bosnia and Herzegovina (1)
- Cameroon (6)
- Canada (9)
- China (15)
- Chinese Taipei (9)
- Colombia (6)
- Croatia (1)
- Cuba (6)
- Cyprus (1)
- Czech Republic (5)
- Dominican Republic (5)
- Egypt (10)
- Finland (3)
- France (7)
- Georgia (4)
- Germany (4)
- Ghana (5)
- Great Britain (1)
- Hong Kong (3)
- Hungary (1)
- Indonesia (4)
- Iran (2)
- Iraq (4)
- Italy (4)
- Japan (12)
- Kazakhstan (9)
- Kyrgyzstan (2)
- Latvia (2)
- Lithuania (1)
- Macau (2)
- Mauritius (1)
- Mexico (11)
- Moldova (3)
- Nauru (2)
- New Zealand (2)
- Nigeria (3)
- Norway (1)
- Palestine (4)
- Poland (12)
- Romania (2)
- Russia (14)
- Samoa (1)
- Sierra Leone (1)
- Slovakia (1)
- South Korea (15)
- Spain (10)
- Sri Lanka (1)
- Sweden (3)
- Syria (2)
- Thailand (8)
- Tunisia (2)
- Turkey (14)
- Turkmenistan (7)
- Ukraine (10)
- United Arab Emirates (1)
- United States (13)
- Uzbekistan (8)
- Venezuela (4)
- Wales (1)
