= Aleksandr Urinov =

Uzbekistani weightlifter (born 1973)

Personal information
- Born: 24 February 1973 (age 53)
- Height: 186 cm (6 ft 1 in)
- Weight: 101.74 kg (224 lb)

Sport
- Country: Uzbekistan
- Sport: Weightlifting
- Weight class: 105 kg (231 lb)
- Team: National team
- Updated on 26 September 2016

Aleksandr Urinov (Александр Уринов, born 24 February 1973) is an Uzbekistani male weightlifter, competing in the 105 kg category and representing Uzbekistan at international competitions. He participated at the 1996 Summer Olympics in the 99 kg event and at the 2004 Summer Olympics in the 105 kg event. He competed at world championships, most recently at the 2006 World Weightlifting Championships.

Urinov was caught for using a cannabis-related substance during the 2006 Asian Games.

== Major results ==
Year	Venue	Weight	Snatch (kg)				Clean & Jerk (kg)				Total	Rank
Year	Venue	Weight	1	2	3	Rank	1	2	3	Rank	Total	Rank
Summer Olympics
2004	Athens, Greece	105 kg				—N/a				—N/a		8
1996	Atlanta, United States	99 kg				—N/a				—N/a		13
World Championships
2006	Santo Domingo, Dominican Republic	105 kg	167	~~170~~	~~170~~	16	193	~~198~~	198	16	365.0	15
2003	Vancouver, Canada	105 kg	175	~~180~~	180	13	205	210	215	12	395	9
