= Mykola Hordiychuk =

Ukrainian weightlifter

Personal information
- Nationality: Ukrainian
- Born: 2 November 1983 (age 42) Magnitogorsk, Russian SFSR, Soviet Union

Sport
- Sport: Weightlifting
Medal record
Men's weightlifting
Representing Ukraine
Summer Universiade
Silver medal – second place	2011 Shenzhen	−105 kg

Mykola Hordiychuk (born 2 November 1983) is a retired Ukrainian weightlifter. He competed in the men's heavyweight event at the 2004 Summer Olympics. He lifted in total 395.0 kg and originally finished 11th but his result was subsequently annulled. Later he served disqualification for doping abuse.
