= Bakhyt Akhmetov =

Kazakhstani weightlifter (born 1979)

Personal information
- Full name: Bakhyt Beshimbekovich Akhmetov
- Nationality: Kazakhstan; Kyrgyzstan
- Born: 27 March 1979 (age 47) Shymkent, Kazakh SSR, Soviet Union
- Height: 1.75 m (5 ft 9 in)
- Weight: 105 kg (231 lb)

Sport
- Sport: Weightlifting
- Event: 105 kg
Medal record
Men's weightlifting
Representing Kazakhstan
Asian Games
Gold medal – first place	2002 Busan	94 kg
Bronze medal – third place	2006 Doha	105 kg

Bakhyt Beshimbekovich Akhmetov (Kazakh: Бахыт Бешимбекович Ахметов, Bahyt Beşimbekovich Ahmetov; born March 27, 1979, in Shymkent) is a Kazakhstani weightlifter. He is a three-time Olympian and a two-time medalist for the 94 and 105 kg classes at the Asian Games.

Formerly a member of the Kyrgyzstan team, Akhmetov made his official debut for the 2000 Summer Olympics in Sydney, where he hauled 367.5 kilograms in total for a fifteenth-place finish in the men's middle heavyweight class (94 kg). In 2002, Akhmetov achieved his early success by capturing the gold medal in the same category at the Asian Games in Busan, South Korea.

Akhmetov was also considered a top medal contender, when he competed at the 2004 Summer Olympics in Athens, representing his birth nation. He lifted a total of 390 kg in the men's 94 kg class, finishing only in seventh place by five kilograms short of the clean and jerk record from Turkey's Hakan Yılmaz.

At the 2006 Asian Games in Doha, Qatar, Akhmetov switched to a heavier class by competing in the men's 105 kg class, where he claimed the bronze medal, with a total of 388 kg.

At the 2008 Summer Olympics in Beijing, Bakhmetov competed this time for the men's heavyweight class (105 kg), against several top-class weightlifters, including world record holders Marcin Dołęga of Poland Andrei Aramnau of Belarus. During the competition, he successfully lifted 190 kg in the single-motion snatch, and hoisted 225 kg in the two-part, shoulder-to-overhead clean and jerk, for a total of 415 kg. Bakhmetov finished the event in fifth place by five kilograms short of Dołęga's overall record (420 kg). For being the most experienced member, Bakhmetov also became Kazakhstan's flag bearer in the opening ceremony.

Olympic Games
Preceded by Alexander Koreshkov	Flagbearer for Kazakhstan; Beijing 2008	Succeeded by Dias Keneshev
