= Moreno Boer =

Italian weightlifter (born 1977)

Personal information
- Nationality: Italy
- Born: 9 January 1977 (age 49) Pordenone, Italy
- Height: 1.80 m (5 ft 11 in)
- Weight: 105 kg (231 lb)

Sport
- Sport: Weightlifting
- Event: 105 kg
- Club: Fiamme Oro
- Coached by: Angelo Mannironi

Moreno Boer (born 9 January 1977) is an Italian weightlifter. He was born in Pordenone. He is a member of the weightlifting team for Gruppo Sportivo Fiamme Oro, and is coached and trained by Angelo Mannironi. Boer made his official debut for the 2000 Summer Olympics in Sydney, where he hauled 365.0 kilograms in total for a twelfth-place finish in the men's heavyweight class (105 kg).

== Biography ==
Eight years after competing in his last Olympics, Boer qualified for his second Italian team, as a 30-year-old, at the 2008 Summer Olympics in Beijing, by finishing twenty-fourth and obtaining a place from the 2007 World Weightlifting Championships in Chiang Mai, Thailand. Boer placed eighteenth in the men's 105 kg class, as he successfully lifted 150 kg in the single-motion snatch, and hoisted 170 kg in the two-part, shoulder-to-overhead clean and jerk, for a total of 330 kg. Boer was later elevated to a higher position, when Ukraine's Ihor Razoronov had been disqualified from the Games, after he tested positive for nandrolone.
