= Libor Wälzer =

Czech weightlifter

Personal information
- Nationality: Czech Republic
- Born: 8 December 1975 (age 50) Sokolov, Czechoslovakia
- Height: 1.82 m (5 ft 11 1/2 in)
- Weight: 105 kg (231 lb)

Sport
- Sport: Weightlifting
- Event: 105 kg
- Club: PSK Olymp Praha
- Coached by: Pavel Ivanic

Libor Wälzer (born 8 December 1975 in Sokolov) is a Czech weightlifter. Walzer represented the Czech Republic at the 2008 Summer Olympics in Beijing, where he competed for the men's heavyweight category (105 kg). Walzer placed sixteenth in this event, as he successfully lifted 163 kg (359 lb) in the single-motion snatch, and hoisted 187 kg (412 lb) in the two-part, shoulder-to-overhead clean and jerk, for a total of 350 kg (770 lb). Walzer was later elevated to a higher position, when Ukraine's Ihor Razoronov had been disqualified from the Olympics, after he tested positive for nandrolone.
