= Florin Vlad =

Romanian weightlifter

Personal information
- Nationality: Romanian
- Born: 14 September 1980 (age 44); Constanța, Romania

Sport
- Sport: Weightlifting

Florin Vlad (born 14 September 1980) is a Romanian weightlifter. He competed in the men's heavyweight event at the 2000 Summer Olympics.
