= Marcin Dołęga =

Polish weightlifter (born 1982)

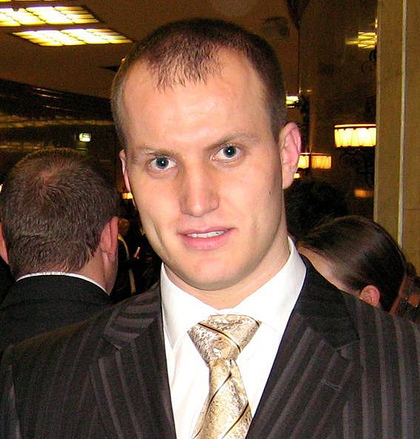

Personal information
- Nationality: Polish
- Born: 18 July 1982 (age 43) Łuków, Poland
- Years active: 1999-
- Height: 1.84 m (6 ft 0 in) (2014)
- Weight: 113 kg (249 lb) (2014)

Sport
- Country: Poland
- Sport: Olympic weightlifting
- Event(s): 105 kg, +105 kg
- Club: CWSPCiSS Zawisza Bydgoszcz
- Turned pro: 1999

Achievements and titles
- Personal bests: Snatch: 201 kg (2008); Clean & Jerk: 235 kg (2008); Total: 436 kg (2008)
Medal record
Men's weightlifting
Representing Poland
Olympic Games
| Bronze medal – third place | 2008 Beijing | -105 kg |
World Championships
| Gold medal – first place | 2006 Santo Domingo | – 105 kg |
| Gold medal – first place | 2009 Goyang | – 105 kg |
| Gold medal – first place | 2010 Antalya | – 105 kg |
European Championships
| Gold medal – first place | 2006 Władysławowo | – 105 kg |

Marcin Dołęga (Polish pronunciation: [ˈmart͡ɕin dɔˈwɛŋɡa]; born 18 July 1982) is a Polish weightlifter. He is a three-time World champion in the 105 kg weight division.

== Personal life ==
Dołęga was born on 18 July 1982 in Łuków, Poland. His brothers Robert and Daniel are also weightlifters.

== Career ==
Dołęga broke the snatch world record in 2002 with 198 kg, and in 2006 with 199 kg.

In 2004 Dołęga was banned for two years because of doping use.

He won at the 2006 World Weightlifting Championships, with a total of 415 kg. He also won at the 2006 European Weightlifting Championships. He represented Poland at the 2008 Summer Olympics, ranking 3rd with a total of 420 kg.

He won the gold medal in the 105 kg category again at the 2009 World Weightlifting Championships, with a total of 426 kg.

== Major results ==
| Year | Venue | Weight | Snatch (kg) | | | | Clean & Jerk (kg) | | | | Total | Rank |
| Year | Venue | Weight | 1 | 2 | 3 | Rank | 1 | 2 | 3 | Rank | Total | Rank |
Olympic Games
| 2008 | Beijing, China | 105 kg | 195 | ~~200~~ | ~~201~~ | 2 | 225 | ~~228~~ | ~~228~~ | 6 | 420 | 3rd place, bronze medalist(s) |
| 2012 | London, United Kingdom | 105 kg | ~~190~~ | ~~190~~ | ~~190~~ | -- | -- | -- | -- | -- | -- | -- |
World Championships
| 2001 | Antalya, Turkey | 105 kg | 180 | 185 | ~~187.5~~ | 8 | 225 | ~~230~~ | ~~232.5~~ | 6 | 410 | 5 |
| 2002 | Warsaw, Poland | 105 kg | ~~192.5~~ | 192.5 | ~~197.5~~ | 2nd place, silver medalist(s) | 220 | ~~225~~ | ~~225~~ | 8 | 412.5 | 6 |
| 2003 | Vancouver, Canada | 105 kg | 190 | ~~195~~ | ~~195~~ | 4 | 220 | ~~225~~ | ~~225~~ | 8 | 410 | 5 |
| 2006 | Santo Domingo, Dominican Republic | 105 kg | ~~193~~ | 193 | ~~200~~ | 2nd place, silver medalist(s) | ~~222~~ | ~~222~~ | 222 | 1st place, gold medalist(s) | 415 | 1st place, gold medalist(s) |
| 2007 | Chiang Mai, Thailand | 105 kg | ~~193~~ | ~~193~~ | ~~193~~ | -- | 226 | ~~232~~ | ~~232~~ | 4 | -- | -- |
| 2009 | Goyang, South Korea | 105 kg | ~~191~~ | 191 | 195 | 1st place, gold medalist(s) | 221 | ~~226~~ | 226 | 1st place, gold medalist(s) | 421 | 1st place, gold medalist(s) |
| 2010 | Antalya, Turkey | 105 kg | 188 | ~~191~~ | ~~192~~ | 3rd place, bronze medalist(s) | 218 | 227 | ~~238~~ | 1st place, gold medalist(s) | 415 | 1st place, gold medalist(s) |
| 2013 | Wrocław, Poland | 105 kg | ~~185~~ | ~~185~~ | ~~185~~ | -- | -- | -- | -- | -- | -- | -- |
