= 2001 World Weightlifting Championships =

International weightlifting competition

2001 World Championships
- Host city: Antalya, Turkey
- Dates: 4–11 November 2001

The 2001 World Weightlifting Championships were held in Antalya, Turkey.

== Medal summary ==
=== Men ===
Event	Gold		Silver		Bronze	
56 kg
Snatch	Halil Mutlu; Turkey	138.5 kg WR	William Vargas; Cuba	127.5 kg	Wang Shin-yuan; Chinese Taipei	122.5 kg
Clean & Jerk	Halil Mutlu; Turkey	162.5 kg	Wang Shin-yuan; Chinese Taipei	157.5 kg	Sergio Álvarez; Cuba	150.0 kg
Total	Halil Mutlu; Turkey	300.0 kg	Wang Shin-yuan; Chinese Taipei	280.0 kg	William Vargas; Cuba	277.5 kg
62 kg
Snatch	Li Yinglong; China	142.5 kg	Nikolaj Pešalov; Croatia	137.5 kg	Henadzi Aliashchuk; Belarus	137.5 kg
Clean & Jerk	Henadzi Aliashchuk; Belarus	181.0 kg WR	Vladimir Rodríguez; Cuba	167.5 kg	Stefan Georgiev; Bulgaria	167.5 kg
Total	Henadzi Aliashchuk; Belarus	317.5 kg	Li Yinglong; China	305.0 kg	Stefan Georgiev; Bulgaria	302.5 kg
69 kg
Snatch	Reyhan Arabacıoğlu; Turkey	155.0 kg	Yasin Arslan; Turkey	150.0 kg	Georgios Tzelilis; Greece	150.0 kg
Clean & Jerk	Galabin Boevski; Bulgaria	190.0 kg	Georgios Tzelilis; Greece	185.0 kg	Andrey Matveyev; Russia	182.5 kg
Total	Galabin Boevski; Bulgaria	340.0 kg	Georgios Tzelilis; Greece	335.0 kg	Reyhan Arabacıoğlu; Turkey	335.0 kg
77 kg
Snatch	Plamen Zhelyazkov; Bulgaria	165.0 kg	Nader Sufyan Abbas; Qatar	162.5 kg	Mohammad Hossein Barkhah; Iran	162.5 kg
Clean & Jerk	Nader Sufyan Abbas; Qatar	202.5 kg	Oleg Perepetchenov; Russia	200.0 kg	Attila Feri; Hungary	200.0 kg
Total	Nader Sufyan Abbas; Qatar	365.0 kg	Oleg Perepetchenov; Russia	360.0 kg	Mohammad Hossein Barkhah; Iran	360.0 kg
85 kg
Snatch	Giorgi Asanidze; Georgia	180.0 kg	Aliaksandr Anishchanka; Belarus	177.5 kg	Milen Dobrev; Bulgaria	175.0 kg
Clean & Jerk	Giorgi Asanidze; Georgia	210.0 kg	Ernesto Quiroga; Cuba	210.0 kg	Aliaksandr Anishchanka; Belarus	207.5 kg
Total	Giorgi Asanidze; Georgia	390.0 kg	Aliaksandr Anishchanka; Belarus	385.0 kg	Milen Dobrev; Bulgaria	382.5 kg
94 kg
Snatch	Kourosh Bagheri; Iran	185.0 kg	Nizami Pashayev; Azerbaijan	182.5 kg	Aleksander Karapetyan; Australia	182.5 kg
Clean & Jerk	Szymon Kołecki; Poland	230.0 kg	Nizami Pashayev; Azerbaijan	222.5 kg	Kourosh Bagheri; Iran	222.5 kg
Total	Kourosh Bagheri; Iran	407.5 kg	Nizami Pashayev; Azerbaijan	405.0 kg	Szymon Kołecki; Poland	402.5 kg
105 kg
Snatch	Vladimir Smorchkov; Russia	198.0 kg WR	Alexandru Bratan; Moldova	190.0 kg	Ihor Razoronov; Ukraine	187.5 kg
Clean & Jerk	Bünyamin Sudaş; Turkey	235.0 kg	Ihor Razoronov; Ukraine	230.0 kg	Alexandru Bratan; Moldova	225.0 kg
Total	Vladimir Smorchkov; Russia	422.5 kg	Bünyamin Sudaş; Turkey	420.0 kg	Ihor Razoronov; Ukraine	417.5 kg
+105 kg
Snatch	Jaber Saeed Salem; Qatar	210.0 kg	Roman Meshcheryakov; Russia	205.0 kg	Andrey Chemerkin; Russia	200.0 kg
Clean & Jerk	Jaber Saeed Salem; Qatar	250.0 kg	Paweł Najdek; Poland	250.0 kg	Andrey Chemerkin; Russia	242.5 kg
Total	Jaber Saeed Salem; Qatar	460.0 kg	Roman Meshcheryakov; Russia	445.0 kg	Andrey Chemerkin; Russia	442.5 kg

=== Women ===
Event	Gold		Silver		Bronze	
48 kg
Snatch	Gao Wei; China	85.0 kg	Remigia Arcila; Venezuela	77.5 kg	Gema Peris; Spain	75.0 kg
Clean & Jerk	Gao Wei; China	105.0 kg	Blessed Udoh; Nigeria	100.0 kg	Chen Han-tung; Chinese Taipei	95.0 kg
Total	Gao Wei; China	190.0 kg	Blessed Udoh; Nigeria	175.0 kg	Chen Han-tung; Chinese Taipei	170.0 kg
53 kg
Snatch	Li Feng-ying; Chinese Taipei	95.0 kg	Qiu Hongxia; China	92.5 kg	Alexandra Escobar; Ecuador	90.0 kg
Clean & Jerk	Alexandra Escobar; Ecuador	115.0 kg	Li Feng-ying; Chinese Taipei	115.0 kg	Qiu Hongxia; China	115.0 kg
Total	Li Feng-ying; Chinese Taipei	210.0 kg	Qiu Hongxia; China	207.5 kg	Alexandra Escobar; Ecuador	205.0 kg
58 kg
Snatch	Marieta Gotfryd; Poland	95.0 kg	Liu Bing; China	95.0 kg	Aleksandra Klejnowska; Poland	92.5 kg
Clean & Jerk	Aleksandra Klejnowska; Poland	122.5 kg	Liu Bing; China	117.5 kg	Sunaina Anand; India	115.0 kg
Total	Aleksandra Klejnowska; Poland	215.0 kg	Liu Bing; China	212.5 kg	Marieta Gotfryd; Poland	202.5 kg
63 kg
Snatch	Xiao Ying; China	105.0 kg	Anastasia Tsakiri; Greece	102.5 kg	Kuo Ping-chun; Chinese Taipei	102.5 kg
Clean & Jerk	Anastasia Tsakiri; Greece	125.0 kg	Kuo Ping-chun; Chinese Taipei	125.0 kg	Xiao Ying; China	125.0 kg
Total	Xiao Ying; China	230.0 kg	Anastasia Tsakiri; Greece	227.5 kg	Kuo Ping-chun; Chinese Taipei	227.5 kg
69 kg
Snatch	Valentina Popova; Russia	115.0 kg WR	Eszter Krutzler; Hungary	110.0 kg	Svetlana Khabirova; Russia	110.0 kg
Clean & Jerk	Valentina Popova; Russia	142.5 kg	Svetlana Khabirova; Russia	140.0 kg	Eszter Krutzler; Hungary	130.0 kg
Total	Valentina Popova; Russia	257.5 kg WR	Svetlana Khabirova; Russia	250.0 kg	Eszter Krutzler; Hungary	240.0 kg
75 kg
Snatch	Gyöngyi Likerecz; Hungary	116.0 kg	Aysel Özgür; Turkey	112.5 kg	Şule Şahbaz; Turkey	112.5 kg
Clean & Jerk	Gyöngyi Likerecz; Hungary	140.0 kg	Cao Chunyan; China	135.0 kg	Kuo Yi-hang; Chinese Taipei	135.0 kg
Total	Gyöngyi Likerecz; Hungary	255.0 kg	Şule Şahbaz; Turkey	247.5 kg	Cao Chunyan; China	242.5 kg
+75 kg
Snatch	Albina Khomich; Russia	127.5 kg	Agata Wróbel; Poland	125.0 kg	Helen Idahosa; Nigeria	117.5 kg
Clean & Jerk	Albina Khomich; Russia	155.0 kg	Viktória Varga; Hungary	150.0 kg	Agata Wróbel; Poland	150.0 kg
Total	Albina Khomich; Russia	282.5 kg	Agata Wróbel; Poland	275.0 kg	Chen Hsiao-lien; Chinese Taipei	262.5 kg

== Medal table ==
Ranking by Big (Total result) medals

Rank	Nation	Gold	Silver	Bronze	Total
1	Russia	3	3	1	7
2	China	2	3	1	6
3	Qatar	2	0	0	2
4	Turkey	1	2	1	4
5	Chinese Taipei	1	1	3	5
6	Poland	1	1	2	4
7	Belarus	1	1	0	2
8	Bulgaria	1	0	2	3
9	Hungary	1	0	1	2
9	Iran	1	0	1	2
11	Georgia	1	0	0	1
12	Greece	0	2	0	2
13	Azerbaijan	0	1	0	1
13	Nigeria	0	1	0	1
15	Cuba	0	0	1	1
15	Ecuador	0	0	1	1
15	Ukraine	0	0	1	1
Totals (17 entries)		15	15	15	45

Ranking by all medals: Big (Total result) and Small (Snatch and Clean & Jerk)

Rank	Nation	Gold	Silver	Bronze	Total
1	Russia	8	6	5	19
2	China	6	7	3	16
3	Turkey	5	4	2	11
4	Qatar	5	1	0	6
5	Poland	4	3	4	11
6	Hungary	3	2	3	8
7	Bulgaria	3	0	4	7
8	Georgia	3	0	0	3
9	Chinese Taipei	2	4	7	13
10	Belarus	2	2	2	6
11	Iran	2	0	3	5
12	Greece	1	4	1	6
13	Ecuador	1	0	2	3
14	Cuba	0	3	2	5
15	Azerbaijan	0	3	0	3
16	Nigeria	0	2	1	3
17	Ukraine	0	1	2	3
18	Moldova	0	1	1	2
19	Croatia	0	1	0	1
19	Venezuela	0	1	0	1
21	Australia	0	0	1	1
21	India	0	0	1	1
21	Spain	0	0	1	1
Totals (23 entries)		45	45	45	135

== Team ranking ==
=== Men ===
Rank	Team	Points
1	Russia	523
2	Turkey	476
3	Bulgaria	462
4	Poland	360
5	Hungary	324
6	Azerbaijan	316

=== Women ===
Rank	Team	Points
1	China	455
2	Russia	426
3	Turkey	423
4	Chinese Taipei	415
5	Greece	336
6	Hungary	327

== Participating nations ==
267 competitors from 53 nations competed.

- Albania (2)
- Algeria (2)
- Armenia (6)
- Australia (2)
- Austria (2)
- Azerbaijan (8)
- Belarus (4)
- Belgium (1)
- Bulgaria (10)
- Cameroon (3)
- Canada (8)
- Chile (1)
- China (11)
- Chinese Taipei (7)
- Colombia (9)
- Croatia (2)
- Cuba (4)
- Czech Republic (3)
- Denmark (1)
- Ecuador (1)
- Egypt (2)
- Estonia (1)
- Finland (5)
- France (2)
- Georgia (4)
- Germany (5)
- Great Britain (14)
- Greece (11)
- Hungary (14)
- India (10)
- Iran (4)
- Iraq (2)
- Israel (4)
- Kazakhstan (6)
- Mexico (8)
- Moldova (3)
- Mongolia (1)
- Netherlands (1)
- New Zealand (2)
- Nigeria (5)
- Poland (10)
- Qatar (3)
- Romania (3)
- Russia (15)
- Slovakia (2)
- South Korea (2)
- Spain (9)
- Sweden (2)
- Switzerland (2)
- Turkey (15)
- Ukraine (6)
- United States (1)
- Venezuela (6)
