= Andre Rohde =

German weightlifter

Personal information
- Nationality: German
- Born: 18 August 1975 (age 49); Görlitz, East Germany

Sport
- Sport: Weightlifting

Andre Rohde (born 18 August 1975) is a German former weightlifter. He competed in the men's heavyweight event at the 2004 Summer Olympics.
