= Alexandru Bratan =

Moldovan weightlifter (born 1977)

Personal information
- Born: 23 August 1977 (age 48) Cahul, Moldavian SSR, Soviet Union
Medal record
Men's Weightlifting
Representing Moldova
World Championships
Silver medal – second place	2005 Doha	– 105 kg
European Championships
Bronze medal – third place	2004 Kyiv	– 105 kg
Bronze medal – third place	2006 Władysławowo	– 105 kg

Alexandru Bratan (born 23 August 1977) is a male weightlifter from Moldova. He twice competed for his native country at the Summer Olympics: 2000 and 2004. He is best known for winning the silver medal in the men's heavyweight division (– 105 kg) at the 2005 World Weightlifting Championships. His brother is Eugen Bratan.

In 2006 the International Weightlifting Federation (IWF) banned Alexandru Bratan for life, for the second doping violation.
