= Robert Dołęga =

Polish weightlifter (born 1977)

Personal information
- Nationality: Poland
- Born: 31 December 1977 (age 48) Łuków, Poland
- Height: 1.81 m (5 ft 11 1/2 in)
- Weight: 105 kg (231 lb)

Sport
- Sport: Weightlifting
- Event: 105 kg
- Club: OKS Start Otwock
Medal record
Men's weightlifting
Representing Poland
European Championships
Silver medal – second place	2000 Sofia	105 kg
Bronze medal – third place	2008 Lignano Sabbiadoro	105 kg

Robert Dołęga (Polish pronunciation: [ˈrɔbɛrd dɔˈwɛŋɡa]; born 31 December 1977) is a Polish weightlifter. He won a silver medal for the heavyweight division at the 2000 European Weightlifting Championships in Sofia, Bulgaria, and bronze at the 2008 European Weightlifting Championships in Lignano Sabbiadoro, Italy.

Dołęga competed in the men's heavyweight class (105 kg) at the 2004 Summer Olympics in Athens. He did not finish the event, after failing to lift a snatch of 180 kg in three attempts.

At the 2008 Summer Olympics in Beijing, Dołęga competed for his second time in the men's 105 kg class, along with his younger brother Marcin. Unlike his previous Olympics, he placed eighth in this event, as he successfully lifted 184 kg in the snatch, and hoisted 221 kg in the clean and jerk, for a total of 405 kg.
