= Bünyamin Sudaş =

Turkish weightlifter (born 1975)

Personal information
- Nationality: Turkish
- Born: August 23, 1975 (age 50) Erzincan Province, Turkey
- Height: 1.76 m (5.8 ft)
- Weight: 104 kg (229 lb)

Sport
- Sport: Weightlifting
- Weight class: –105 kg
- Club: ASKI Sports Club
- Coached by: Raif Özel, Muharrem Süleymanoğlu
Medal record
Men's weightlifting
Representing Turkey
World Championships
Silver medal – second place	2001 Antalya	105 kg
Bronze medal – third place	2003 Vancouver	105 kg
European Championships
Silver medal – second place	2002 Antalya	105 kg
Silver medal – second place	2005 Sofia	105 kg
Bronze medal – third place	1999 A Coruña	94 kg
Bronze medal – third place	2000 Sofia	94 kg
Mediterranean Games
Gold medal – first place	1997 Bari	91 kg S
Gold medal – first place	1997 Bari	91 kg C
Gold medal – first place	2005 Almería	105 kg C
Silver medal – second place	2005 Almería	105 kg S
Silver medal – second place	2009 Pescara	105 kg S
Silver medal – second place	2009 Pescara	105 kg C

Bünyamin Sudaş (born 23 August 1975) is a Turkish Olympic weightlifter who competed in the –105 kg category.

He represented Turkey at the 2000 Summer Olympics and 2008 Summer Olympics, winning multiple medals at the World Weightlifting Championships, European Weightlifting Championships, and Mediterranean Games.

== Early life ==
Sudaş was born in Ekmekli village, Erzincan Province, Turkey. After finishing high school, he studied physical education and sports at Gazi University in Ankara.

== Career ==
Bünyamin Sudaş competed internationally throughout the late 1990s and 2000s. He was a member of the ASKI Sports Club in Ankara, where he was coached by Raif Özel and Muharrem Süleymanoğlu.

== Major results ==
Year	Venue	Weight	Snatch (kg)				Clean & Jerk (kg)				Total	Rank
Year	Venue	Weight	1	2	3	Rank	1	2	3	Rank	Total	Rank
Olympic Games
2000	Sydney, Australia	–94 kg	175	177.5	~~180~~	8	210	215	~~217.5~~	7	392.5	7
2008	Beijing, China	–105 kg	160	166	~~170~~	14	205	207	~~210~~	14	373	14
World Weightlifting Championships
2001	Antalya, Turkey	–105 kg	190	195	~~200~~	2	230	235	—	2	420	2nd place, silver medalist(s)
2003	Vancouver, Canada	–105 kg	185	190	~~195~~	3	225	230	—	3	415	3rd place, bronze medalist(s)
European Weightlifting Championships
1999	A Coruña, Spain	–94 kg	170	175	—	3	215	220	—	3	390	3rd place, bronze medalist(s)
2000	Sofia, Bulgaria	–94 kg	172.5	175	—	3	215	217.5	—	3	392.5	3rd place, bronze medalist(s)
2002	Antalya, Turkey	–105 kg	180	182.5	185	2	230	232.5	—	2	417.5	2nd place, silver medalist(s)
2005	Sofia, Bulgaria	–105 kg	180	182.5	185	2	225	227.5	—	2	410	2nd place, silver medalist(s)
Mediterranean Games
1997	Bari, Italy	–91 kg	160	165	—	1st place, gold medalist(s)	200	205	—	1st place, gold medalist(s)	370	1st place, gold medalist(s)
2005	Almería, Spain	–105 kg	175	178	—	2nd place, silver medalist(s)	220	226	—	1st place, gold medalist(s)	404	1st place, gold medalist(s)
2009	Pescara, Italy	–105 kg	168	170	—	2nd place, silver medalist(s)	210	212	—	2nd place, silver medalist(s)	382	2nd place, silver medalist(s)
