= Kim Hwa-seung =

South Korean weightlifter (born 1985)

Kim Hwa-Seung (Korean: 김화승; born 22 June 1985 in South Jeolla) is a South Korean weightlifter. He competed at the 2012 Summer Olympics in the -105 kg event, but was eliminated when he could not register a lift in the snatch part of the competition.
