= Ihor Razoronov =

Ukrainian weightlifter (born 1970)

Personal information
- Native name: Ігор Анатолійович Разорьонов
- Full name: Ihor Anatoliyovych Razoronov
- Born: 25 March 1970 (age 56) Krasnyi Lyman, Donetsk Oblast, Ukrainian SSR, Soviet Union
Medal record
Men's Weightlifting
Representing Ukraine
Olympic Games
Silver medal – second place	2004 Athens	– 105 kg
World Championships
Bronze medal – third place	1993 Melbourne	– 108 kg
Gold medal – first place	1995 Guangzhou	– 108 kg
Gold medal – first place	1998 Lahti	– 105 kg
Bronze medal – third place	2001 Antalya	– 105 kg
European Championships
Bronze medal – third place	1994 Sokolov	– 108 kg
Gold medal – first place	2003 Loutraki	– 105 kg

Ihor Anatoliyovych Razoronov (Ukrainian: Ігор Анатолійович Разорьонов; born March 25, 1970) is a Ukrainian weightlifter. He appeared at the 2008 Summer Olympics in Beijing but was disqualified after testing positive for nandrolone.
