= Ahed Joughili =

Syrian weightlifter (born 1984)

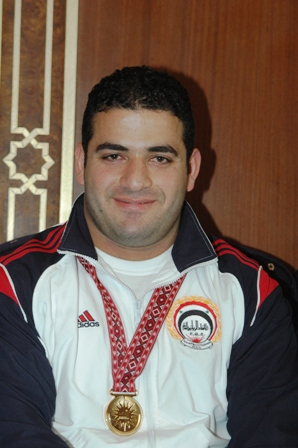
- Ahed Joughili in 2013

Personal information
- Born: October 10, 1984 (age 41) Hama, Syria
- Height: 1.80 m (5 ft 11 in)
- Weight: 104 kg (229 lb)
Medal record
Men's Weightlifting
Representing Syria
Asian Games
Gold medal – first place	2006 Doha	105 kg
Asian Championships
Silver medal – second place	2015 Phuket	105 kg
Silver medal – second place	2011 Tongling	105 kg
Mediterranean Games
Gold medal – first place	2009 Pescara	105 kg Clean&Jerk
Gold medal – first place	2009 Pescara	105 kg Snatch
Silver medal – second place	2005 Almería	105 kg Clean&Jerk
Silver medal – second place	2013 Mersin	105 kg Clean&Jerk
Silver medal – second place	2013 Mersin	105 kg Snatch
Bronze medal – third place	2005 Almería	105 kg Snatch
Islamic Solidarity Games
Gold medal – first place	2005 Medina	105 kg
Gold medal – first place	2013 Palembang	105 kg

Ahed Joughili (Arabic: عهد جغيلي; born October 10, 1984) is a Syrian weightlifter, who competed in the 105 kg division at the 2008 Summer Olympics and 2012 Summer Olympics. Joughili won a silver medal at the 2005 Mediterranean Games and a gold medal at the 2006 Asian Games. Joughili claimed both gold medals for the 105 kg snatch and clean&jerk at the 2009 Mediterranean Games.
