= List of multiple Olympic gold medalists in one event =

This is a list of Olympians that have won at least three gold medals in one event. It includes top-three placings in 1896 and 1900, before medals were awarded for top-three placings. Medals won in the 1906 Intercalated Games are not included. The Olympics listed for each athlete only include games when they won medals in the specified event.

== Individual events ==
| Rank | Athlete | Nation | Sex | Period | Games | Sport | Event | Gold medal | Silver medal | Bronze medal | Total |
|---|---|---|---|---|---|---|---|---|---|---|---|
| 1 | Mijaín López | Cuba | M | 2008–2024 | Summer | Wrestling | Greco-Roman 120/130 kg (Note: The upper and/or lower limits for different weight classes in wrestling and weightlifting have varied across different Olympics.) | 5 | 0 | 0 | 5 |
| 2 | Paul Elvstrøm | Denmark | M | 1948–1960 | Summer | Sailing | Firefly/Finn (Note: The Firefly of 1948 was replaced from 1952 as the Olympic solo dinghy class by the Finn; whether they are the "same" event is a matter of opinion.) | 4 | 0 | 0 | 4 |
| 2 | Al Oerter | United States | M | 1956–1968 | Summer | Athletics | Discus throw | 4 | 0 | 0 | 4 |
| 2 | Carl Lewis | United States | M | 1984–1996 | Summer | Athletics | Long jump | 4 | 0 | 0 | 4 |
| 2 | Michael Phelps | United States | M | 2004–2016 | Summer | Swimming | 200 m individual medley | 4 | 0 | 0 | 4 |
| 2 | Vincent Hancock^{NC} | United States | M | 2008–2024 | Summer | Shooting | Skeet | 4 | 0 | 0 | 4 |
| 2 | Katie Ledecky | United States | F | 2012–2024 | Summer | Swimming | 800 m freestyle | 4 | 0 | 0 | 4 |
| 8 | Georg Hackl | West Germany; Germany | M | 1988–2002 | Winter | Luge | Singles | 3 | 2 | 0 | 5 |
| 8 | Ralf Schumann^{NC} | East Germany; Germany | M | 1988–2008 | Summer | Shooting | 25 m rapid fire pistol | 3 | 2 | 0 | 5 |
| 10 | Claudia Pechstein | Germany | F | 1992–2006 | Winter | Speed skating | 5000 m | 3 | 1 | 1 | 5 |
| 10 | Valentina Vezzali | Italy | F | 1996–2012 | Summer | Fencing | Individual foil | 3 | 1 | 1 | 5 |
| 10 | Ireen Wüst^{NC} | Netherlands | F | 2006–2022 | Winter | Speed skating | 1500 m | 3 | 1 | 1 | 5 |
| 13 | Gillis Grafström | Sweden | M | 1920–1932 | Both | Figure skating | Singles | 3 | 1 | 0 | 4 |
| 13 | Klaus Dibiasi | Italy | M | 1964–1976 | Summer | Diving | 10 m platform | 3 | 1 | 0 | 4 |
| 13 | Viktor Saneyev | Soviet Union | M | 1968–1980 | Summer | Athletics | Triple jump | 3 | 1 | 0 | 4 |
| 13 | Aleksandr Karelin | Soviet Union; Unified Team; Russia | M | 1988–2000 | Summer | Wrestling | Greco-Roman 130 kg | 3 | 1 | 0 | 4 |
| 13 | Jan Železný | Czechoslovakia; Czech Republic | M | 1988–2000 | Summer | Athletics | Javelin throw | 3 | 1 | 0 | 4 |
| 13 | Anky van Grunsven | Netherlands | F | 1996–2008 | Summer | Equestrian | Individual dressage | 3 | 1 | 0 | 4 |
| 13 | Jong-oh Jin | South Korea | M | 2004–2016 | Summer | Shooting | 50 m pistol | 3 | 1 | 0 | 4 |
| 13 | Michael Phelps | United States | M | 2004–2016 | Summer | Swimming | 100 m butterfly | 3 | 1 | 0 | 4 |
| 13 | Michael Phelps^{NC} | United States | M | 2004–2016 | Summer | Swimming | 200 m butterfly | 3 | 1 | 0 | 4 |
| 13 | Saori Yoshida | Japan | F | 2004–2016 | Summer | Wrestling | Freestyle 53/55 kg | 3 | 1 | 0 | 4 |
| 13 | Sven Kramer | Netherlands | M | 2006–2018 | Winter | Speed Skating | 5000 m | 3 | 1 | 0 | 4 |
| 24 | Teddy Riner^{NC} | France | M | 2008–2024 | Summer | Judo | +100kg | 3 | 0 | 2 | 5 |
| 25 | Gert Fredriksson | Sweden | M | 1948–1960 | Summer | Canoeing | K-1 1000 m | 3 | 0 | 1 | 4 |
| 25 | Pyrros Dimas | Greece | M | 1992–2004 | Summer | Weightlifting | 85 kg | 3 | 0 | 1 | 4 |
| 25 | Kjetil André Aamodt^{NC} | Norway | M | 1992–2006 | Winter | Alpine Skiing | Super-G | 3 | 0 | 1 | 4 |
| 25 | Natalie Geisenberger | Germany | F | 2010–2022 | Winter | Luge | Singles | 3 | 0 | 1 | 4 |
| 29 | Ray Ewry | United States | M | 1900–1908 | Summer | Athletics | Standing high jump | 3 | 0 | 0 | 3 |
| 29 | Ray Ewry | United States | M | 1900–1908 | Summer | Athletics | Standing long jump | 3 | 0 | 0 | 3 |
| 29 | John Flanagan | United States | M | 1900–1908 | Summer | Athletics | Hammer throw | 3 | 0 | 0 | 3 |
| 29 | Sonja Henie | Norway | F | 1928–1936 | Winter | Figure skating | Singles | 3 | 0 | 0 | 3 |
| 29 | László Papp | Hungary | M | 1948–1956 | Summer | Boxing | Middleweight | 3 | 0 | 0 | 3 |
| 29 | Dawn Fraser | Australia | F | 1956–1964 | Summer | Swimming | 100 m freestyle | 3 | 0 | 0 | 3 |
| 29 | Vyacheslav Ivanov | Soviet Union | M | 1956–1964 | Summer | Rowing | Single sculls | 3 | 0 | 0 | 3 |
| 29 | Larisa Latynina | Soviet Union | F | 1956–1964 | Summer | Gymnastics | Floor exercise | 3 | 0 | 0 | 3 |
| 29 | Irina Rodnina | Soviet Union | F | 1972–1980 | Winter | Figure skating | Pairs | 3 | 0 | 0 | 3 |
| 29 | Teófilo Stevenson | Cuba | M | 1972–1980 | Summer | Boxing | Heavyweight | 3 | 0 | 0 | 3 |
| 29 | Ulrich Wehling | East Germany | M | 1972–1980 | Winter | Nordic combined | Individual | 3 | 0 | 0 | 3 |
| 29 | Pertti Karppinen | Finland | M | 1976–1984 | Summer | Rowing | Single sculls | 3 | 0 | 0 | 3 |
| 29 | Bonnie Blair | United States | F | 1988–1994 | Winter | Speed skating | 500 m | 3 | 0 | 0 | 3 |
| 29 | Krisztina Egerszegi | Hungary | F | 1988–1996 | Summer | Swimming | 200 m backstroke | 3 | 0 | 0 | 3 |
| 29 | Naim Süleymanoğlu | Turkey | M | 1988–1996 | Summer | Weightlifting | 60/64 kg | 3 | 0 | 0 | 3 |
| 29 | Félix Savón | Cuba | M | 1992–2000 | Summer | Boxing | Heavyweight | 3 | 0 | 0 | 3 |
| 29 | Robert Korzeniowski | Poland | M | 1996–2004 | Summer | Athletics | 50 km walk | 3 | 0 | 0 | 3 |
| 29 | Halil Mutlu | Turkey | M | 1996–2004 | Summer | Weightlifting | 54/56 kg | 3 | 0 | 0 | 3 |
| 29 | Tadahiro Nomura | Japan | M | 1996–2004 | Summer | Judo | 60 kg | 3 | 0 | 0 | 3 |
| 29 | Buvaisar Saitiev^{NC} | Russia | M | 1996–2008 | Summer | Wrestling | Freestyle 74 kg | 3 | 0 | 0 | 3 |
| 29 | Ole Einar Bjørndalen^{NC} | Norway | M | 1998–2014 | Winter | Biathlon | 10 km sprint | 3 | 0 | 0 | 3 |
| 29 | Tony Estanguet^{NC} | France | M | 2000–2012 | Summer | Canoeing | Slalom C-1 | 3 | 0 | 0 | 3 |
| 29 | Ben Ainslie (Note: Also won a gold medal for Laser class at the 2000 Olympics (and a silver medal for the same class at the 1996 Olympics)) | Great Britain | M | 2004–2012 | Summer | Sailing | Finn | 3 | 0 | 0 | 3 |
| 29 | Kaori Icho (Note: Also won a gold medal for 58kg at the 2016 Olympics where the 63kg event was also held) | Japan | F | 2004–2012 | Summer | Wrestling | Freestyle 63 kg | 3 | 0 | 0 | 3 |
| 29 | Shaun White^{NC} | United States | M | 2006–2018 | Winter | Snowboarding | Halfpipe | 3 | 0 | 0 | 3 |
| 29 | Kristin Armstrong | United States | F | 2008–2016 | Summer | Cycling | Time trial | 3 | 0 | 0 | 3 |
| 29 | Usain Bolt | Jamaica | M | 2008–2016 | Summer | Athletics | 100 m | 3 | 0 | 0 | 3 |
| 29 | Usain Bolt | Jamaica | M | 2008–2016 | Summer | Athletics | 200 m | 3 | 0 | 0 | 3 |
| 29 | Dario Cologna | Switzerland | M | 2010–2018 | Winter | Cross-country skiing | 15 km | 3 | 0 | 0 | 3 |
| 29 | Lisa Carrington | New Zealand | F | 2012–2020 | Summer | Canoeing | K-1 200 m | 3 | 0 | 0 | 3 |
| 29 | Lü Xiaojun | China | M | 2012–2020 | Summer | Weightlifting | 77/81 kg | 3 | 0 | 0 | 3 |
| 29 | Áron Szilágyi | Hungary | M | 2012–2020 | Summer | Fencing | Individual sabre | 3 | 0 | 0 | 3 |
| 29 | Anita Włodarczyk | Poland | F | 2012–2020 | Summer | Athletics | Hammer throw | 3 | 0 | 0 | 3 |
| 29 | Ryan Crouser | United States | M | 2016–2024 | Summer | Athletics | Shot put | 3 | 0 | 0 | 3 |
| 29 | Faith Kipyegon | Kenya | F | 2016–2024 | Summer | Athletics | 1500 m | 3 | 0 | 0 | 3 |
| 29 | Lasha Talakhadze | Georgia | M | 2016–2024 | Summer | Weightlifting | +102/104/109 kg | 3 | 0 | 0 | 3 |
| 29 | Nafissatou Thiam | Belgium | F | 2016–2024 | Summer | Athletics | Heptathlon | 3 | 0 | 0 | 3 |
| 29 | Johannes Høsflot Klæbo | Norway | M | 2018–2026 | Winter | Cross-country skiing | Individual sprint | 3 | 0 | 0 | 3 |

=== Notes ===
NC: Gold medals won in non-consecutive Olympic Games

Athletes who won three golds in different weight classes:

- Aleksandr Medved ( Soviet Union, freestyle wrestling) — light heavyweight 1964 (97 kg); heavyweight 1968 (+97 kg) and 1972 (+100 kg)
- Kakhi Kakhiashvili ( Unified Team/Greece, weightlifting) — 1992 90 kg (fourth-heaviest, between 82.5 kg and 100 kg); 1996 99 kg (third-heaviest, between 91 kg and 108 kg); 2000 94 kg (third-heaviest, between 85 kg and 105 kg).

Athletes who forfeited golds after retesting of samples revealed drug violations:

- Artur Taymazov — ( Uzbekistan, freestyle wrestling 120 kg) — 2004, 2008 (forfeited 2017), and 2012 (forfeited 2019)

== Team events ==
| Rank | Athlete | Nation | Sex | Period | Games | Sport | Event | Gold medal | Silver medal | Bronze medal | Total |
|---|---|---|---|---|---|---|---|---|---|---|---|
| 1 | Isabell Werth | Germany | F | 1992–2024 | Summer | Equestrian | Team dressage | 7 | 0 | 0 | 7 |
| 2 | Aladár Gerevich | Hungary | M | 1932–1960 | Summer | Fencing | Team sabre | 6 | 0 | 0 | 6 |
| 2 | Diana Taurasi | United States | F | 2004–2024 | Summer | Basketball | Team | 6 | 0 | 0 | 6 |
| 4 | Pál Kovács | Hungary | M | 1936–1960 | Summer | Fencing | Team sabre | 5 | 0 | 0 | 5 |
| 4 | Reiner Klimke | United Team of Germany; West Germany | M | 1964–1988 | Summer | Equestrian | Team dressage | 5 | 0 | 0 | 5 |
| 4 | Sue Bird | United States | F | 2004–2020 | Summer | Basketball | Team | 5 | 0 | 0 | 5 |
| 7 | Hans Günter Winkler | United Team of Germany; West Germany | M | 1956–1976 | Summer | Equestrian | Team jumping | 4 | 1 | 1 | 6 |
| 8 | Edoardo Mangiarotti | Italy | M | 1936–1960 | Summer | Fencing | Team épée | 4 | 1 | 0 | 5 |
| 8 | Birgit Fischer | East Germany; Germany | F | 1980–2004 | Summer | Canoeing | K-4 500 m | 4 | 1 | 0 | 5 |
| 8 | Ricco Groß | Germany | M | 1992–2006 | Winter | Biathlon | 4×7.5 km relay | 4 | 1 | 0 | 5 |
| 8 | Jayna Hefford | Canada | F | 1998–2014 | Winter | Ice hockey | Team | 4 | 1 | 0 | 5 |
| 8 | Hayley Wickenheiser | Canada | F | 1998–2014 | Winter | Ice hockey | Team | 4 | 1 | 0 | 5 |
| 13 | Teresa Edwards | United States | F | 1984–2000 | Summer | Basketball | Team | 4 | 0 | 1 | 5 |
| 14 | Rudolf Kárpáti | Hungary | M | 1948–1960 | Summer | Fencing | Team sabre | 4 | 0 | 0 | 4 |
| 14 | Alexander Tikhonov | Soviet Union | M | 1968–1980 | Winter | Biathlon | 4×7.5 km relay | 4 | 0 | 0 | 4 |
| 14 | Lisa Leslie | United States | F | 1996–2008 | Summer | Basketball | Team | 4 | 0 | 0 | 4 |
| 14 | Caroline Ouellette | Canada | F | 2002–2014 | Winter | Ice hockey | Team | 4 | 0 | 0 | 4 |
| 14 | Tamika Catchings | United States | F | 2004–2016 | Summer | Basketball | Team | 4 | 0 | 0 | 4 |
| 14 | Ryan Lochte | United States | M | 2004–2016 | Summer | Swimming | 4 × 200 m freestyle relay | 4 | 0 | 0 | 4 |
| 14 | Michael Phelps | United States | M | 2004–2016 | Summer | Swimming | 4 × 200 m freestyle relay | 4 | 0 | 0 | 4 |
| 14 | Michael Phelps | United States | M | 2004–2016 | Summer | Swimming | 4 × 100 m medley relay | 4 | 0 | 0 | 4 |
| 14 | Wu Minxia | China | F | 2004–2016 | Summer | Diving | 3 m synchro | 4 | 0 | 0 | 4 |
| 14 | Allyson Felix | United States | F | 2008–2020 | Summer | Athletics | 4 × 400 m relay | 4 | 0 | 0 | 4 |
| 14 | Sylvia Fowles | United States | F | 2008–2020 | Summer | Basketball | Team | 4 | 0 | 0 | 4 |
| 14 | Svetlana Romashina | Russia; ROC | F | 2008–2020 | Summer | Artistic swimming | Team | 4 | 0 | 0 | 4 |
| 14 | Kevin Durant | United States | M | 2012–2024 | Summer | Basketball | Team | 4 | 0 | 0 | 4 |
| 14 | Ma Long | China | M | 2012–2024 | Summer | Table tennis | Team | 4 | 0 | 0 | 4 |
| 14 | Tobias Arlt | Germany | M | 2014–2026 | Winter | Luge | Team relay | 4 | 0 | 0 | 4 |
| 14 | Tobias Wendl | Germany | M | 2014–2026 | Winter | Luge | Team relay | 4 | 0 | 0 | 4 |
| 30 | Marie-Philip Poulin | Canada | F | 2010–2026 | Winter | Ice hockey | Team | 3 | 2 | 0 | 5 |
| 31 | Dezső Gyarmati | Hungary | M | 1948–1964 | Summer | Water polo | Team | 3 | 1 | 1 | 5 |
| 31 | Dara Torres | United States | F | 1984–2008 | Summer | Swimming | 4 × 100 m freestyle relay | 3 | 1 | 1 | 5 |
| 31 | Elena Georgescu | Romania | F | 1992–2008 | Summer | Rowing | Eight | 3 | 1 | 1 | 5 |
| 34 | Leslie Claudius | India | M | 1948–1960 | Summer | Field hockey | Team | 3 | 1 | 0 | 4 |
| 34 | Udham Singh | India | M | 1948–1960 | Summer | Field hockey | Team | 3 | 1 | 0 | 4 |
| 34 | Giuseppe Delfino | Italy | M | 1952–1964 | Summer | Fencing | Team épée | 3 | 1 | 0 | 4 |
| 34 | Galina Gorokhova | Soviet Union | F | 1960–1972 | Summer | Fencing | Team foil | 3 | 1 | 0 | 4 |
| 34 | Vladimir Nazlymov | Soviet Union | M | 1968–1980 | Summer | Fencing | Team sabre | 3 | 1 | 0 | 4 |
| 34 | Viktor Sidyak | Soviet Union | M | 1968–1980 | Summer | Fencing | Team sabre | 3 | 1 | 0 | 4 |
| 34 | Ivan Patzaichin | Romania | M | 1968–1984 | Summer | Canoeing | C-2 1000 m | 3 | 1 | 0 | 4 |
| 34 | Vladislav Tretiak | Soviet Union | M | 1972–1984 | Winter | Ice hockey | Team | 3 | 1 | 0 | 4 |
| 34 | Jenny Thompson | United States | F | 1992–2004 | Summer | Swimming | 4 × 100 m freestyle relay | 3 | 1 | 0 | 4 |
| 34 | Jenny Thompson | United States | F | 1992–2004 | Summer | Swimming | 4 × 100 m medley | 3 | 1 | 0 | 4 |
| 34 | Andrew Hoy | Australia | M | 1992–2020 | Summer | Equestrian | Three-day event team | 3 | 1 | 0 | 4 |
| 34 | Sven Fischer | Germany | M | 1994–2006 | Winter | Biathlon | 4×7.5 km relay | 3 | 1 | 0 | 4 |
| 34 | Jennifer Botterill | Canada | F | 1998–2010 | Winter | Ice hockey | Team | 3 | 1 | 0 | 4 |
| 34 | Christie Rampone | United States | F | 2000–2012 | Summer | Football | Team | 3 | 1 | 0 | 4 |
| 34 | Katrin Wagner | Germany | F | 2000–2012 | Summer | Canoeing | K-4 500 m | 3 | 1 | 0 | 4 |
| 34 | Eva de Goede | Netherlands | F | 2008–2020 | Summer | Field hockey | Team | 3 | 1 | 0 | 4 |
| 34 | Nikola Karabatić | France | M | 2008–2020 | Summer | Handball | Team | 3 | 1 | 0 | 4 |
| 34 | Jason Kenny | Great Britain | M | 2008–2020 | Summer | Cycling | Team sprint | 3 | 1 | 0 | 4 |
| 34 | Lidewij Welten | Netherlands | F | 2008–2020 | Summer | Field hockey | Team | 3 | 1 | 0 | 4 |
| 34 | Rebecca Johnston | Canada | F | 2010–2022 | Winter | Ice hockey | Team | 3 | 1 | 0 | 4 |
| 54 | Eskild Ebbesen | Denmark | M | 1996–2012 | Summer | Rowing | Lightweight coxless fours | 3 | 0 | 2 | 5 |
| 54 | Katrine Lunde | Norway | F | 2008–2024 | Summer | Handball | Team | 3 | 0 | 2 | 5 |
| 56 | György Kárpáti | Hungary | M | 1952–1964 | Summer | Water polo | Team | 3 | 0 | 1 | 4 |
| 56 | Andrey Lavrov | Soviet Union; Unified Team; Russia | M | 1988–2004 | Summer | Handball | Team | 3 | 0 | 1 | 4 |
| 56 | Ludger Beerbaum | Germany | M | 1988–2016 | Summer | Equestrian | Team jumping | 3 | 0 | 1 | 4 |
| 56 | Ana Fernández | Cuba | F | 1992–2004 | Summer | Volleyball | Team | 3 | 0 | 1 | 4 |
| 56 | Stanislav Pozdnyakov | Unified Team; Russia | M | 1992–2004 | Summer | Fencing | Team sabre | 3 | 0 | 1 | 4 |
| 56 | Giovanna Trillini | Italy | F | 1992–2008 | Summer | Fencing | Team foil | 3 | 0 | 1 | 4 |
| 56 | Valentina Vezzali | Italy | F | 1996–2012 | Summer | Fencing | Team foil | 3 | 0 | 1 | 4 |
| 56 | Pavol Hochschorner | Slovakia | M | 2000–2012 | Summer | Canoeing | Slalom C-2 | 3 | 0 | 1 | 4 |
| 56 | Peter Hochschorner | Slovakia | M | 2000–2012 | Summer | Canoeing | Slalom C-2 | 3 | 0 | 1 | 4 |
| 56 | Kerri Walsh | United States | F | 2004–2016 | Summer | Beach volleyball | Team | 3 | 0 | 1 | 4 |
| 56 | LeBron James | United States | M | 2004–2024 | Summer | Basketball | Team | 3 | 0 | 1 | 4 |
| 56 | Carmelo Anthony | United States | M | 2008–2016 | Summer | Basketball | Team | 3 | 0 | 1 | 4 |
| 56 | Cate Campbell | Australia | F | 2008–2020 | Summer | Swimming | 4 × 100 m freestyle relay | 3 | 0 | 1 | 4 |
| 56 | Dušan Mandić | Serbia | M | 2012–2024 | Summer | Water polo | Team | 3 | 0 | 1 | 4 |
| 56 | Tobias Arlt | Germany | M | 2014–2026 | Winter | Luge | Doubles | 3 | 0 | 1 | 4 |
| 56 | Tobias Wendl | Germany | M | 2014–2026 | Winter | Luge | Doubles | 3 | 0 | 1 | 4 |
| 72 | Paulo Radmilovic | Great Britain | M | 1908–1920 | Summer | Water polo | Team | 3 | 0 | 0 | 3 |
| 72 | Charles Sydney Smith | Great Britain | M | 1908–1920 | Summer | Water polo | Team | 3 | 0 | 0 | 3 |
| 72 | Paul Costello | United States | M | 1920–1928 | Summer | Rowing | Double sculls | 3 | 0 | 0 | 3 |
| 72 | Dhyan Chand | India | M | 1928–1936 | Summer | Field hockey | Team | 3 | 0 | 0 | 3 |
| 72 | Frank Wykoff | United States | M | 1928–1936 | Summer | Athletics | 4 × 100 m relay | 3 | 0 | 0 | 3 |
| 72 | Tibor Berczelly | Hungary | M | 1936–1952 | Summer | Fencing | Team sabre | 3 | 0 | 0 | 3 |
| 72 | László Rajcsányi | Hungary | M | 1936–1952 | Summer | Fencing | Team sabre | 3 | 0 | 0 | 3 |
| 72 | Ranganathan Francis | India | M | 1948–1956 | Summer | Field hockey | Team | 3 | 0 | 0 | 3 |
| 72 | Randhir Singh Gentle | India | M | 1948–1956 | Summer | Field hockey | Team | 3 | 0 | 0 | 3 |
| 72 | Balbir Singh Sr. | India | M | 1948–1956 | Summer | Field hockey | Team | 3 | 0 | 0 | 3 |
| 72 | Carlo Pavesi | Italy | M | 1952–1960 | Summer | Fencing | Team épée | 3 | 0 | 0 | 3 |
| 72 | Polina Astakhova | Soviet Union | F | 1956–1964 | Summer | Gymnastics | Team | 3 | 0 | 0 | 3 |
| 72 | Larisa Latynina | Soviet Union | F | 1956–1964 | Summer | Gymnastics | Team | 3 | 0 | 0 | 3 |
| 72 | Yukio Endo | Japan | M | 1960–1968 | Summer | Gymnastics | Team | 3 | 0 | 0 | 3 |
| 72 | Vitaly Davydov | Soviet Union | M | 1964–1972 | Winter | Ice hockey | Team | 3 | 0 | 0 | 3 |
| 72 | Anatoli Firsov | Soviet Union | M | 1964–1972 | Winter | Ice hockey | Team | 3 | 0 | 0 | 3 |
| 72 | Győző Kulcsár | Hungary | M | 1964–1972 | Summer | Fencing | Team épée | 3 | 0 | 0 | 3 |
| 72 | Victor Kuzkin | Soviet Union | M | 1964–1972 | Winter | Ice hockey | Team | 3 | 0 | 0 | 3 |
| 72 | Alexander Ragulin | Soviet Union | M | 1964–1972 | Winter | Ice hockey | Team | 3 | 0 | 0 | 3 |
| 72 | Sawao Kato | Japan | M | 1968–1976 | Summer | Gymnastics | Team | 3 | 0 | 0 | 3 |
| 72 | Ludmilla Tourischeva | Soviet Union | F | 1968–1976 | Summer | Gymnastics | Team | 3 | 0 | 0 | 3 |
| 72 | Mitsuo Tsukahara | Japan | M | 1968–1976 | Summer | Gymnastics | Team | 3 | 0 | 0 | 3 |
| 72 | Elena Novikova-Belova | Soviet Union | F | 1968–1980 | Summer | Fencing | Team foil | 3 | 0 | 0 | 3 |
| 72 | Evelyn Ashford | United States | F | 1984–1992 | Summer | Athletics | 4 × 100 m relay | 3 | 0 | 0 | 3 |
| 72 | Matt Biondi | United States | M | 1984–1992 | Summer | Swimming | 4 × 100 m freestyle | 3 | 0 | 0 | 3 |
| 72 | Andrei Khomutov | Soviet Union; Unified Team | M | 1984–1992 | Winter | Ice hockey | Team | 3 | 0 | 0 | 3 |
| 72 | Steve Redgrave | Great Britain | M | 1988–1996 | Summer | Rowing | Coxless pair | 3 | 0 | 0 | 3 |
| 72 | Monica Theodorescu | Germany | F | 1988–1996 | Summer | Equestrian | Team dressage | 3 | 0 | 0 | 3 |
| 72 | Nina Gavrilyuk | Soviet Union; Russia | F | 1988–1998 | Winter | Cross-country skiing | 4×5 km | 3 | 0 | 0 | 3 |
| 72 | Rechelle Hawkes | Australia | F | 1988–2000 | Summer | Field hockey | Team | 3 | 0 | 0 | 3 |
| 72 | Kim Soo-nyung | South Korea | F | 1988–2000 | Summer | Archery | Team | 3 | 0 | 0 | 3 |
| 72 | Larisa Lazutina | Unified Team; Russia | F | 1992–1998 | Winter | Cross-country skiing | 4×5 km | 3 | 0 | 0 | 3 |
| 72 | Yelena Välbe | Unified Team; Russia | F | 1992–1998 | Winter | Cross-country skiing | 4×5 km | 3 | 0 | 0 | 3 |
| 72 | Regla Bell | Cuba | F | 1992–2000 | Summer | Volleyball | Team | 3 | 0 | 0 | 3 |
| 72 | Marlenis Costa | Cuba | F | 1992–2000 | Summer | Volleyball | Team | 3 | 0 | 0 | 3 |
| 72 | Idalmis Gato | Cuba | F | 1992–2000 | Summer | Volleyball | Team | 3 | 0 | 0 | 3 |
| 72 | Lilia Izquierdo | Cuba | F | 1992–2000 | Summer | Volleyball | Team | 3 | 0 | 0 | 3 |
| 72 | Mireya Luis | Cuba | F | 1992–2000 | Summer | Volleyball | Team | 3 | 0 | 0 | 3 |
| 72 | Regla Torres | Cuba | F | 1992–2000 | Summer | Volleyball | Team | 3 | 0 | 0 | 3 |
| 72 | Dawn Staley | United States | F | 1996–2004 | Summer | Basketball | Team | 3 | 0 | 0 | 3 |
| 72 | Sheryl Swoopes | United States | F | 1996–2004 | Summer | Basketball | Team | 3 | 0 | 0 | 3 |
| 72 | Constanţa Burcică | Romania | F | 1996–2004 | Summer | Rowing | Lightweight double sculls | 3 | 0 | 0 | 3 |
| 72 | Liliana Gafencu | Romania | F | 1996–2004 | Summer | Rowing | Eight | 3 | 0 | 0 | 3 |
| 72 | Doina Ignat | Romania | F | 1996–2004 | Summer | Rowing | Eight | 3 | 0 | 0 | 3 |
| 72 | Elisabeta Lipă | Romania | F | 1996–2004 | Summer | Rowing | Eight | 3 | 0 | 0 | 3 |
| 72 | Laura Berg | United States | F | 1996–2004 | Summer | Softball | Team | 3 | 0 | 0 | 3 |
| 72 | Lisa Fernandez | United States | F | 1996–2004 | Summer | Softball | Team | 3 | 0 | 0 | 3 |
| 72 | Lori Harrigan | United States | F | 1996–2004 | Summer | Softball | Team | 3 | 0 | 0 | 3 |
| 72 | Katie Smith | United States | F | 2000–2008 | Summer | Basketball | Team | 3 | 0 | 0 | 3 |
| 72 | Georgeta Damian | Romania | F | 2000–2008 | Summer | Rowing | Coxless pair | 3 | 0 | 0 | 3 |
| 72 | Ian Crocker | United States | M | 2000–2008 | Summer | Swimming | 4 × 100 m medley | 3 | 0 | 0 | 3 |
| 72 | Jason Lezak | United States | M | 2000–2008 | Summer | Swimming | 4 × 100 m medley | 3 | 0 | 0 | 3 |
| 72 | Tibor Benedek | Hungary | M | 2000–2008 | Summer | Water polo | Team | 3 | 0 | 0 | 3 |
| 72 | Péter Biros | Hungary | M | 2000–2008 | Summer | Water polo | Team | 3 | 0 | 0 | 3 |
| 72 | Tamás Kásás | Hungary | M | 2000–2008 | Summer | Water polo | Team | 3 | 0 | 0 | 3 |
| 72 | Gergely Kiss | Hungary | M | 2000–2008 | Summer | Water polo | Team | 3 | 0 | 0 | 3 |
| 72 | Tamás Molnár | Hungary | M | 2000–2008 | Summer | Water polo | Team | 3 | 0 | 0 | 3 |
| 72 | Zoltán Szécsi | Hungary | M | 2000–2008 | Summer | Water polo | Team | 3 | 0 | 0 | 3 |
| 72 | Kim St-Pierre | Canada | F | 2002–2010 | Winter | Ice hockey | Team | 3 | 0 | 0 | 3 |
| 72 | Serena Williams | United States | F | 2000–2012 | Summer | Tennis | Doubles | 3 | 0 | 0 | 3 |
| 72 | Venus Williams | United States | F | 2000–2012 | Summer | Tennis | Doubles | 3 | 0 | 0 | 3 |
| 72 | Anastasia Davydova | Russia | F | 2004–2012 | Summer | Artistic swimming | Team | 3 | 0 | 0 | 3 |
| 72 | Mariya Gromova | Russia | F | 2004–2012 | Summer | Artistic swimming | Team | 3 | 0 | 0 | 3 |
| 72 | Elvira Khasyanova | Russia | F | 2004–2012 | Summer | Artistic swimming | Team | 3 | 0 | 0 | 3 |
| 72 | Sanya Richards | United States | F | 2004–2012 | Summer | Athletics | 4 × 400 m relay | 3 | 0 | 0 | 3 |
| 72 | Misty May-Treanor | United States | F | 2004–2012 | Summer | Beach volleyball | Team | 3 | 0 | 0 | 3 |
| 72 | Shannon Boxx | United States | F | 2004–2012 | Summer | Football | Team | 3 | 0 | 0 | 3 |
| 72 | Heather Mitts | United States | F | 2004–2012 | Summer | Football | Team | 3 | 0 | 0 | 3 |
| 72 | Heather O'Reilly | United States | F | 2004–2012 | Summer | Football | Team | 3 | 0 | 0 | 3 |
| 72 | Brendan Hansen | United States | M | 2004–2012 | Summer | Swimming | 4 × 100 m medley relay | 3 | 0 | 0 | 3 |
| 72 | Seimone Augustus | United States | F | 2008–2016 | Summer | Basketball | Team | 3 | 0 | 0 | 3 |
| 72 | Ed Clancy | Great Britain | M | 2008–2016 | Summer | Cycling | Team Pursuit | 3 | 0 | 0 | 3 |
| 72 | Chen Ruolin | China | F | 2008–2016 | Summer | Diving | 10 m synchro | 3 | 0 | 0 | 3 |
| 72 | Elle Logan | United States | F | 2008–2016 | Summer | Rowing | Eight | 3 | 0 | 0 | 3 |
| 72 | Alexandra Patskevich | Russia; ROC | F | 2012–2020 | Summer | Artistic swimming | Team | 3 | 0 | 0 | 3 |
| 72 | Svetlana Romashina | Russia; ROC | F | 2012–2020 | Summer | Artistic swimming | Duet | 3 | 0 | 0 | 3 |
| 72 | Alla Shishkina | Russia; ROC | F | 2012–2020 | Summer | Artistic swimming | Team | 3 | 0 | 0 | 3 |
| 72 | Tina Charles | United States | F | 2012–2020 | Summer | Basketball | Team | 3 | 0 | 0 | 3 |
| 72 | Melissa Seidemann | United States | F | 2012–2020 | Summer | Water polo | Team | 3 | 0 | 0 | 3 |
| 72 | Maggie Steffens | United States | F | 2012–2020 | Summer | Water polo | Team | 3 | 0 | 0 | 3 |
| 72 | Natalie Geisenberger | Germany | F | 2014–2022 | Winter | Luge | Team relay | 3 | 0 | 0 | 3 |
| 72 | Shim Suk-hee | South Korea | F | 2014–2026 | Winter | Short-track speed skating | 3000 m relay | 3 | 0 | 0 | 3 |
| 72 | Kim Woo-jin | South Korea | M | 2016–2024 | Summer | Archery | Team | 3 | 0 | 0 | 3 |
| 72 | Brittney Griner | United States | F | 2016–2024 | Summer | Basketball | Team | 3 | 0 | 0 | 3 |
| 72 | Breanna Stewart | United States | F | 2016–2024 | Summer | Basketball | Team | 3 | 0 | 0 | 3 |
| 72 | Bronte Campbell | Australia | F | 2016–2024 | Summer | Swimming | 4 × 100 m freestyle relay | 3 | 0 | 0 | 3 |
| 72 | Caeleb Dressel | United States | M | 2016–2024 | Summer | Swimming | 4 × 100 m freestyle relay | 3 | 0 | 0 | 3 |
| 72 | Emma McKeon | Australia | F | 2016–2024 | Summer | Swimming | 4 × 100 m freestyle relay | 3 | 0 | 0 | 3 |
| 72 | Nikola Jakšić | Serbia | M | 2016–2024 | Summer | Water polo | Team | 3 | 0 | 0 | 3 |
| 72 | Sava Ranđelović | Serbia | M | 2016–2024 | Summer | Water polo | Team | 3 | 0 | 0 | 3 |
| 72 | Johannes Høsflot Klæbo | Norway | M | 2018–2026 | Winter | Cross-country skiing | Team sprint | 3 | 0 | 0 | 3 |

== Team events, consecutive titles ==
| Rank | Athlete | Nation | Sex | Period | Games | Sport | Event | Gold medal |
|---|---|---|---|---|---|---|---|---|
| 1 | Aladár Gerevich | Hungary | M | 1932–1960 | Summer | Fencing | Team sabre | 6 |
| 1 | Diana Taurasi | United States | F | 2004–2024 | Summer | Basketball | Team | 6 |
| 3 | Pál Kovács | Hungary | M | 1936–1960 | Summer | Fencing | Team sabre | 5 |
| 3 | Sue Bird | United States | F | 2004–2020 | Summer | Basketball | Team | 5 |
| 5 | Rudolf Kárpáti | Hungary | M | 1948–1960 | Summer | Fencing | Team sabre | 4 |
| 5 | Alexander Tikhonov | Soviet Union | M | 1968–1980 | Winter | Biathlon | 2×7.5 km relay | 4 |
| 5 | Lisa Leslie | United States | F | 1996–2008 | Summer | Basketball | Team | 4 |
| 5 | Jayna Hefford | Canada | F | 1998–2014 | Winter | Ice hockey | Team | 4 |
| 5 | Hayley Wickenheiser | Canada | F | 1998–2014 | Winter | Ice hockey | Team | 4 |
| 5 | Caroline Ouellette | Canada | F | 2002–2014 | Winter | Ice hockey | Team | 4 |
| 5 | Wu Minxia | China | F | 2004–2016 | Summer | Diving | Synchronised 3 m springboard | 4 |
| 5 | Ryan Lochte | United States | M | 2004–2016 | Summer | Swimming | 4 × 200 m freestyle relay | 4 |
| 5 | Michael Phelps | United States | M | 2004–2016 | Summer | Swimming | 4 × 200 m freestyle relay | 4 |
| 5 | Michael Phelps | United States | M | 2004–2016 | Summer | Swimming | 4 × 100 m medley relay | 4 |
| 5 | Tamika Catchings | United States | F | 2004–2016 | Summer | Basketball | Team | 4 |
| 5 | Allyson Felix | United States | F | 2008–2020 | Summer | Athletics | 4 × 400 m relay | 4 |
| 5 | Sylvia Fowles | United States | F | 2008–2020 | Summer | Basketball | Team | 4 |
| 5 | Svetlana Romashina | Russia; ROC | F | 2008–2020 | Summer | Synchronized swimming | Team | 4 |
| 5 | Ma Long | China | M | 2012–2024 | Summer | Table tennis | Team | 4 |
| 5 | Kevin Durant | United States | M | 2012–2024 | Summer | Basketball | Team | 4 |
| 21 | Paulo Radmilovic | Great Britain | M | 1908–1920 | Summer | Water polo | Team | 3 |
| 21 | Charles Sydney Smith | Great Britain | M | 1908–1920 | Summer | Water polo | Team | 3 |
| 21 | Paul Costello | United States | M | 1920–1928 | Summer | Rowing | Double sculls | 3 |
| 21 | Dhyan Chand | India | M | 1928–1936 | Summer | Field hockey | Team | 3 |
| 21 | Frank Wykoff | United States | M | 1928–1936 | Summer | Athletics | 4 × 100 m relay | 3 |
| 21 | Ranganathan Francis | India | M | 1948–1956 | Summer | Field hockey | Team | 3 |
| 21 | Randhir Singh Gentle | India | M | 1948–1956 | Summer | Field hockey | Team | 3 |
| 21 | Balbir Singh Sr. | India | M | 1948–1956 | Summer | Field hockey | Team | 3 |
| 21 | Udham Singh | India | M | 1948–1956 | Summer | Field hockey | Team | 3 |
| 21 | Leslie Claudius | India | M | 1948–1956 | Summer | Field hockey | Team | 3 |
| 21 | Edoardo Mangiarotti | Italy | M | 1952–1960 | Summer | Fencing | Team épée | 3 |
| 21 | Carlo Pavesi | Italy | M | 1952–1960 | Summer | Fencing | Team épée | 3 |
| 21 | Hans Günter Winkler | United Team of Germany | M | 1956–1964 | Summer | Equestrian | Team jumping | 3 |
| 21 | Larisa Latynina | Soviet Union | F | 1956–1964 | Summer | Gymnastics | Team | 3 |
| 21 | Polina Astakhova | Soviet Union | F | 1956–1964 | Summer | Gymnastics | Team | 3 |
| 21 | Yukio Endo | Japan | M | 1960–1968 | Summer | Gymnastics | Team | 3 |
| 21 | Vitaly Davydov | Soviet Union | M | 1964–1972 | Winter | Ice hockey | Team | 3 |
| 21 | Victor Kuzkin | Soviet Union | M | 1964–1972 | Winter | Ice hockey | Team | 3 |
| 21 | Alexander Ragulin | Soviet Union | M | 1964–1972 | Winter | Ice hockey | Team | 3 |
| 21 | Anatoli Firsov | Soviet Union | M | 1964–1972 | Winter | Ice hockey | Team | 3 |
| 21 | Ludmilla Tourischeva | Soviet Union | F | 1968–1976 | Summer | Gymnastics | Team | 3 |
| 21 | Sawao Kato | Japan | M | 1968–1976 | Summer | Gymnastics | Team | 3 |
| 21 | Mitsuo Tsukahara | Japan | M | 1968–1976 | Summer | Gymnastics | Team | 3 |
| 21 | Matt Biondi | United States | M | 1984–1992 | Summer | Swimming | 4 × 100 m freestyle | 3 |
| 21 | Evelyn Ashford | United States | F | 1984–1992 | Summer | Athletics | 4 × 100 m relay | 3 |
| 21 | Steve Redgrave | Great Britain | M | 1984–2000 | Summer | Rowing | Coxless pair | 3 |
| 21 | Andrei Khomutov | Soviet Union; Unified Team | M | 1984–1992 | Winter | Ice hockey | Team | 3 |
| 21 | Monica Theodorescu | Germany | F | 1988–1996 | Summer | Equestrian | Team dressage | 3 |
| 21 | Ricco Groß | Germany | M | 1992–1998 | Winter | Biathlon | 4×7.5 km relay | 3 |
| 21 | Isabell Werth | Germany | F | 1992–2000; 2016–2024 | Summer | Equestrian | Team dressage | 3 |
| 21 | Larisa Lazutina | Unified Team; Russia | F | 1992–1998 | Winter | Cross-country skiing | 4×5 km | 3 |
| 21 | Andrew Hoy | Australia | M | 1992–2000 | Summer | Equestrian | Three-day event team | 3 |
| 21 | Yelena Välbe | Unified Team; Russia | F | 1992–1998 | Winter | Cross-country skiing | 4×5 km | 3 |
| 21 | Regla Bell | Cuba | F | 1992–2000 | Summer | Volleyball | Team | 3 |
| 21 | Mireya Luis | Cuba | F | 1992–2000 | Summer | Volleyball | Team | 3 |
| 21 | Idalmis Gato | Cuba | F | 1992–2000 | Summer | Volleyball | Team | 3 |
| 21 | Lilia Izquierdo | Cuba | F | 1992–2000 | Summer | Volleyball | Team | 3 |
| 21 | Regla Torres | Cuba | F | 1992–2000 | Summer | Volleyball | Team | 3 |
| 21 | Marlenis Costa | Cuba | F | 1992–2000 | Summer | Volleyball | Indoor | 3 |
| 21 | Birgit Fischer | Germany | F | 1996–2004 | Summer | Canoeing | K-4 500 m | 3 |
| 21 | Elisabeta Lipă | Romania | F | 1996–2004 | Summer | Rowing | Eight | 3 |
| 21 | Liliana Gafencu | Romania | F | 1996–2004 | Summer | Rowing | Eight | 3 |
| 21 | Dawn Staley | United States | F | 1996–2004 | Summer | Basketball | Team | 3 |
| 21 | Carmelo Anthony | United States | M | 2008–2016 | Summer | Basketball | Team | 3 |
| 21 | Seimone Augustus | United States | F | 2008–2016 | Summer | Basketball | Team | 3 |
| 21 | Sheryl Swoopes | United States | F | 1996–2004 | Summer | Basketball | Team | 3 |
| 21 | Laura Berg | United States | F | 1996–2004 | Summer | Softball | Team | 3 |
| 21 | Lisa Fernandez | United States | F | 1996–2004 | Summer | Softball | Team | 3 |
| 21 | Lori Harrigan | United States | F | 1996–2004 | Summer | Softball | Team | 3 |
| 21 | Georgeta Damian | Romania | F | 2000–2008 | Summer | Rowing | Coxless pair | 3 |
| 21 | Jason Lezak | United States | M | 2000–2008 | Summer | Swimming | 4 × 100 m medley | 3 |
| 21 | Ian Crocker | United States | M | 2000–2008 | Summer | Swimming | 4 × 100 m medley | 3 |
| 21 | Tibor Benedek | Hungary | M | 2000–2008 | Summer | Water polo | Team | 3 |
| 21 | Gergely Kiss | Hungary | M | 2000–2008 | Summer | Water polo | Team | 3 |
| 21 | Péter Biros | Hungary | M | 2000–2008 | Summer | Water polo | Team | 3 |
| 21 | Tamás Kásás | Hungary | M | 2000–2008 | Summer | Water polo | Team | 3 |
| 21 | Tamás Molnár | Hungary | M | 2000–2008 | Summer | Water polo | Team | 3 |
| 21 | Zoltán Szécsi | Hungary | M | 2000–2008 | Summer | Water polo | Team | 3 |
| 21 | Katie Smith | United States | F | 2000–2008 | Summer | Basketball | Team | 3 |
| 21 | Christie Rampone | United States | F | 2004–2012 | Summer | Football | Team | 3 |
| 21 | Heather Mitts | United States | F | 2004–2012 | Summer | Football | Team | 3 |
| 21 | Shannon Boxx | United States | F | 2004–2012 | Summer | Football | Team | 3 |
| 21 | Heather O'Reilly | United States | F | 2004–2012 | Summer | Football | Team | 3 |
| 21 | Brendan Hansen | United States | M | 2004–2012 | Summer | Swimming | 4 × 100 m medley relay | 3 |
| 21 | Kerri Walsh | United States | F | 2004–2012 | Summer | Beach volleyball | Team | 3 |
| 21 | Misty May-Treanor | United States | F | 2004–2012 | Summer | Beach volleyball | Team | 3 |
| 21 | Jason Kenny | Great Britain | M | 2008–2016 | Summer | Cycling | Team Sprint | 3 |
| 21 | Ed Clancy | Great Britain | M | 2008–2016 | Summer | Cycling | Team Pursuit | 3 |
| 21 | Chen Ruolin | China | F | 2008–2016 | Summer | Diving | 10 m synchro | 3 |
| 21 | Elle Logan | United States | F | 2008–2016 | Summer | Rowing | Eight | 3 |
| 21 | Cate Campbell | Australia | F | 2012–2020 | Summer | Swimming | 4 × 100 m freestyle relay | 3 |
| 21 | Alexandra Patskevich | Russia; ROC | F | 2012–2020 | Summer | Synchronized swimming | Team | 3 |
| 21 | Svetlana Romashina | Russia; ROC | F | 2012–2020 | Summer | Synchronized swimming | Duet | 3 |
| 21 | Alla Shishkina | Russia; ROC | F | 2012–2020 | Summer | Synchronized swimming | Team | 3 |
| 21 | Melissa Seidemann | United States | F | 2012–2020 | Summer | Water polo | Team | 3 |
| 21 | Maggie Steffens | United States | F | 2012–2020 | Summer | Water polo | Team | 3 |
| 21 | Kevin Durant | United States | M | 2012–2020 | Summer | Basketball | Team | 3 |
| 21 | Tina Charles | United States | F | 2012–2020 | Summer | Basketball | Team | 3 |
| 21 | Natalie Geisenberger | Germany | F | 2014–2022 | Winter | Luge | Team relay | 3 |
| 21 | Tobias Arlt | Germany | M | 2014–2026 | Winter | Luge | Team relay | 4 |
| 21 | Tobias Wendl | Germany | M | 2014–2026 | Winter | Luge | Team relay | 4 |
| 21 | Bronte Campbell | Australia | F | 2016–2024 | Summer | Swimming | 4 × 100 m freestyle relay | 3 |
| 21 | Emma McKeon | Australia | F | 2016–2024 | Summer | Swimming | 4 × 100 m freestyle relay | 3 |
| 21 | Caeleb Dressel | United States | M | 2016–2024 | Summer | Swimming | 4 × 100 m freestyle relay | 3 |
| 21 | Kim Woo-jin | South Korea | M | 2016–2024 | Summer | Archery | Team | 3 |
| 21 | Dušan Mandić | Serbia | M | 2016–2024 | Summer | Water polo | Team | 3 |
| 21 | Sava Ranđelović | Serbia | M | 2016–2024 | Summer | Water polo | Team | 3 |
| 21 | Nikola Jakšić | Serbia | M | 2016–2024 | Summer | Water polo | Team | 3 |
| 21 | Brittney Griner | United States | F | 2016–2024 | Summer | Basketball | Team | 3 |
| 21 | Breanna Stewart | United States | F | 2016–2024 | Summer | Basketball | Team | 3 |

== Team events, consecutive, identical team ==
| Rank | Athletes | Nation | Sex | Period | Games | Sport | Event | Gold medal |
|---|---|---|---|---|---|---|---|---|
| 1 | Pavol Hochschorner; Peter Hochschorner | Slovakia | M | 2000–2008 | Summer | Canoeing | C-2 slalom | 3 |
| 1 | Misty May-Treanor; Kerri Walsh | United States | F | 2004–2012 | Summer | Beach volleyball | Team | 3 |
| 1 | Tobias Arlt; Tobias Wendl | Germany | M | 2014–2022 | Winter | Luge | Doubles | 3 |

== See also ==
- List of multiple Olympic gold medalists
- List of multiple Olympic gold medalists at a single Games
- List of multiple Olympic medalists in one event
- List of medal sweeps in Olympic athletics
- List of multiple Paralympic gold medalists
- All-time Olympic Games medal table
