= 1997 World Weightlifting Championships – Men's 99 kg =

The 1997 World Weightlifting Championships were held in Chiang Mai, Thailand from December 6 to December 14. The men's competition in the 99 kg division was staged on 13 December 1997.

== Medalists ==
Event	Gold		Silver		Bronze	
Snatch	Martin Tešovič (SVK)	180.0 kg	Choi Jong-kun (KOR)	177.5 kg	Lorenzo Carrió (ESP)	172.5 kg
Clean & Jerk	Martin Tešovič (SVK)	220.0 kg	Ernesto Montoya (CUB)	215.0 kg	Oleksiy Obukhov (UKR)	212.5 kg
Total	Martin Tešovič (SVK)	400.0 kg	Choi Jong-kun (KOR)	387.5 kg	Oleksiy Obukhov (UKR)	385.0 kg

== Records ==
Prior to this competition, the existing world records were as follows.

World record	Snatch	Sergey Syrtsov (RUS)	192.5 kg	Istanbul, Turkey	25 November 1994
World record	Clean & Jerk	Akakios Kakiasvilis (GRE)	235.0 kg	Atlanta, United States	28 July 1996
World record	Total	Akakios Kakiasvilis (GRE)	420.0 kg	Atlanta, United States	28 July 1996

== Results ==
Rank	Athlete	Body weight	Snatch (kg)				Clean & Jerk (kg)				Total
Rank	Athlete	Body weight	1	2	3	Rank	1	2	3	Rank	Total
1st place, gold medalist(s)	Martin Tešovič (SVK)	97.70	172.5	177.5	180.0	1st place, gold medalist(s)	215.0	220.0	—	1st place, gold medalist(s)	400.0
2nd place, silver medalist(s)	Choi Jong-kun (KOR)	97.50	170.0	172.5	177.5	2nd place, silver medalist(s)	205.0	~~210.0~~	210.0	4	387.5
3rd place, bronze medalist(s)	Oleksiy Obukhov (UKR)	98.85	162.5	167.5	172.5	5	200.0	207.5	212.5	3rd place, bronze medalist(s)	385.0
4	Gleb Pisarevskiy (RUS)	98.65	~~172.5~~	~~172.5~~	172.5	4	195.0	202.5	207.5	6	380.0
5	Sergey Kopytov (KAZ)	98.05	160.0	~~167.5~~	167.5	6	200.0	207.5	~~212.5~~	5	375.0
6	Ernesto Montoya (CUB)	98.90	160.0	~~165.0~~	~~165.0~~	14	210.0	215.0	~~217.5~~	2nd place, silver medalist(s)	375.0
7	Lorenzo Carrió (ESP)	98.55	165.0	170.0	172.5	3rd place, bronze medalist(s)	200.0	~~205.0~~	~~205.0~~	12	372.5
8	Mario Kalinke (GER)	98.25	~~165.0~~	165.0	~~167.5~~	7	190.0	202.5	205.0	8	370.0
9	Alexandru Bratan (MDA)	98.35	165.0	~~170.0~~	~~170.0~~	8	~~200.0~~	200.0	205.0	9	370.0
10	Tom Gough (USA)	98.40	165.0	~~170.0~~	~~170.0~~	9	205.0	~~212.5~~	~~212.5~~	10	370.0
11	Janne Kanerva (FIN)	98.85	160.0	~~165.0~~	~~165.0~~	13	200.0	205.0	207.5	7	367.5
12	Hennadiy Krasylnykov (UKR)	98.75	160.0	~~165.0~~	165.0	10	200.0	~~207.5~~	~~207.5~~	13	365.0
13	Akos Sandor (CAN)	98.50	~~157.5~~	~~157.5~~	157.5	16	185.0	190.0	195.0	14	352.5
14	Adrian Mateaș (ROM)	98.00	160.0	~~165.0~~	~~165.0~~	12	~~190.0~~	~~190.0~~	190.0	16	350.0
15	Mika Reijonen (FIN)	98.80	155.0	~~160.0~~	~~160.0~~	17	195.0	~~200.0~~	~~200.0~~	15	350.0
16	Roman Polom (CZE)	98.75	160.0	~~165.0~~	165.0	11	182.5	~~190.0~~	~~190.0~~	20	347.5
17	Cristián Escalante (CHI)	98.20	152.5	~~157.5~~	157.5	15	182.5	~~187.5~~	~~187.5~~	19	340.0
18	Terdkiat Puekkhasem (THA)	98.45	135.0	~~145.0~~	145.0	18	175.0	~~185.0~~	185.0	18	330.0
19	Andrew Callard (GBR)	93.95	~~142.5~~	142.5	~~147.5~~	19	185.0	~~190.0~~	~~195.0~~	17	327.5
20	Wen Wei-chih (TPE)	96.60	135.0	140.0	~~142.5~~	20	160.0	170.0	—	23	310.0
21	Su Tsung-jung (TPE)	97.80	130.0	~~137.5~~	~~137.5~~	21	~~180.0~~	180.0	~~190.0~~	21	310.0
—	Tharwat Bendary (EGY)	98.35	~~160.0~~	~~160.0~~	~~160.0~~	—	~~200.0~~	200.0	~~212.5~~	11	—
—	Aghvan Grigoryan (ARM)	98.70	~~165.0~~	~~165.0~~	~~165.0~~	—	180.0	~~190.0~~	~~190.0~~	22	—
DQ	Ramūnas Vyšniauskas (LTU)	98.25	155.0	~~160.0~~	160.0	—	185.0	~~190.0~~	190.0	—	—
