= 1998 World Weightlifting Championships – Men's 105 kg =

The 1998 World Weightlifting Championships were held in Lahti, Finland from November 7 to November 15. The men's competition in the heavyweight (– 105 kg) division was staged on 15 November 1998.

== Medalists ==
Event	Gold		Silver		Bronze	
Snatch	Cui Wenhua (CHN)	195.0 kg	Denys Hotfrid (UKR)	192.5 kg	Ihor Razoronov (UKR)	190.0 kg
Clean & Jerk	Ihor Razoronov (UKR)	232.5 kg	Martin Tešovič (SVK)	227.5 kg	Cui Wenhua (CHN)	225.0 kg
Total	Ihor Razoronov (UKR)	422.5 kg	Cui Wenhua (CHN)	420.0 kg	Denys Hotfrid (UKR)	415.0 kg

== Records ==
Prior to this competition, the existing world records were as follows.

World Record	Snatch	World Standard	197.5 kg	—	1 January 1998
World Record	Clean & Jerk	World Standard	242.5 kg	—	1 January 1998
World Record	Total	World Standard	440.0 kg	—	1 January 1998

== Results ==
Rank	Athlete	Body weight	Snatch (kg)				Clean & Jerk (kg)				Total
Rank	Athlete	Body weight	1	2	3	Rank	1	2	3	Rank	Total
1st place, gold medalist(s)	Ihor Razoronov (UKR)	104.67	190.0	~~195.0~~	~~195.0~~	3rd place, bronze medalist(s)	222.5	227.5	232.5	1st place, gold medalist(s)	422.5
2nd place, silver medalist(s)	Cui Wenhua (CHN)	102.92	190.0	195.0	~~198.0~~	1st place, gold medalist(s)	215.0	220.0	225.0	3rd place, bronze medalist(s)	420.0
3rd place, bronze medalist(s)	Denys Hotfrid (UKR)	104.85	187.5	192.5	~~198.0~~	2nd place, silver medalist(s)	222.5	~~230.0~~	~~230.0~~	4	415.0
4	Evgeny Shishlyannikov (RUS)	104.90	185.0	190.0	~~195.0~~	4	220.0	~~227.0~~	~~232.5~~	7	410.0
5	Martin Tešovič (SVK)	104.08	180.0	~~185.0~~	~~185.0~~	9	220.0	~~227.5~~	227.5	2nd place, silver medalist(s)	407.5
6	Sergey Syrtsov (RUS)	104.61	185.0	~~190.0~~	~~190.0~~	6	215.0	220.0	~~227.5~~	6	405.0
7	Vladimir Yemelyanov (BLR)	104.72	177.5	182.5	~~187.5~~	7	~~207.5~~	~~210.0~~	210.0	13	392.5
8	Mukhran Gogia (GEO)	100.59	175.0	~~180.0~~	180.0	8	~~210.0~~	210.0	~~220.0~~	11	390.0
9	Dimitri Prochorow (GER)	104.10	170.0	175.0	~~177.5~~	10	202.5	~~207.5~~	210.0	12	385.0
10	Péter Tamton (HUN)	104.37	~~165.0~~	165.0	170.0	13	210.0	215.0	~~220.0~~	9	385.0
11	Abdulaziz Alpak (TUR)	102.01	165.0	~~175.0~~	~~175.0~~	17	~~205.0~~	205.0	215.0	8	380.0
12	Janne Kanerva (FIN)	104.40	162.5	167.5	~~172.5~~	16	200.0	207.5	212.5	10	380.0
13	Moreno Boer (ITA)	104.65	170.0	175.0	~~177.5~~	11	200.0	~~205.0~~	205.0	14	380.0
14	Hisaya Yoshimoto (JPN)	104.71	~~165.0~~	165.0	170.0	14	205.0	~~210.0~~	~~212.5~~	15	375.0
15	Oļegs Jegorovs (LAT)	104.72	167.5	172.5	~~175.0~~	12	195.0	200.0	~~202.5~~	19	372.5
16	Lars Brandt (GER)	101.78	162.5	~~167.5~~	167.5	15	195.0	~~202.5~~	202.5	16	370.0
17	Akos Sandor (CAN)	103.94	160.0	~~165.0~~	165.0	18	190.0	197.5	200.0	18	365.0
18	Deivan Valencia (COL)	103.55	155.0	~~160.0~~	160.0	21	195.0	200.0	~~205.0~~	17	360.0
19	Roman Polom (CZE)	104.58	160.0	~~165.0~~	165.0	19	182.5	190.0	195.0	21	360.0
20	Marius Alecu (ROM)	104.80	160.0	~~165.0~~	~~165.0~~	22	200.0	~~210.0~~	~~210.0~~	20	360.0
21	Ruslan Bessaev (AZE)	100.80	155.0	162.5	~~167.5~~	20	175.0	~~182.5~~	182.5	23	345.0
22	Apolosio Tokotuu (FRA)	104.22	150.0	155.0	~~160.0~~	24	185.0	190.0	~~195.0~~	22	345.0
23	Mate Rodić (CRO)	94.08	120.0	~~125.0~~	~~125.0~~	25	140.0	145.0	~~150.0~~	24	265.0
—	Grzegorz Kleszcz (POL)	104.51	180.0	185.0	187.5	5	~~222.5~~	~~222.5~~	~~222.5~~	—	—
—	Thomas Yule (GBR)	104.63	150.5	~~155.0~~	157.5	23	~~187.5~~	~~187.5~~	~~190.0~~	—	—
—	Jordi Simón (ESP)	102.83	~~155.0~~	~~155.0~~	~~155.0~~	—	—	—	—	—	—
—	Mariusz Jędra (POL)	104.03	~~177.5~~	~~177.5~~	~~177.5~~	—	220.0	~~225.0~~	—	5	—
—	Mika Reijonen (FIN)	104.84	~~160.0~~	~~160.0~~	~~162.5~~	—	—	—	—	—	—
