= 1999 World Weightlifting Championships – Men's 105 kg =

The Men's Heavyweight Weightlifting Event (105 kg) is the seventh men's weight class event at the weightlifting competition, limiting competitors to a maximum of 105 kilograms of body mass. The competition at the 1999 World Weightlifting Championships took place on in Athens, Greece, on 28 November 1999.

Each lifter performed in both the snatch and clean and jerk lifts, with the final score being the sum of the lifter's best result in each. The athlete received three attempts in each of the two lifts; the score for the lift was the heaviest weight successfully lifted.

Denys Hotfrid of Ukraine won the gold medal. Evgeny Shishlyannikov of Russia finished second and Korean weightlifter Choi Jong-kun finished third and won the bronze.

== Medalists ==
Event	Gold		Silver		Bronze	
Snatch	Denys Hotfrid (UKR)	195.0 kg	Choi Jong-kun (KOR)	190.0 kg	Evgeny Shishlyannikov (RUS)	190.0 kg
Clean & Jerk	Evgeny Shishlyannikov (RUS)	235.0 kg	Denys Hotfrid (UKR)	235.0 kg	Robert Dołęga (POL)	225.0 kg
Total	Denys Hotfrid (UKR)	430.0 kg	Evgeny Shishlyannikov (RUS)	425.0 kg	Choi Jong-kun (KOR)	410.0 kg

== Records ==
Prior to this competition, the existing world records were as follows.

World record	Snatch	World Standard	197.5 kg	—	1 January 1998
World record	Clean & jerk	World Standard	242.5 kg	—	1 January 1998
World record	Total	World Standard	440.0 kg	—	1 January 1998

== Results ==
Rank	Athlete	Body weight	Snatch (kg)				Clean & Jerk (kg)				Total
Rank	Athlete	Body weight	1	2	3	Rank	1	2	3	Rank	Total
1st place, gold medalist(s)	Denys Hotfrid (UKR)	104.94	190.0	195.0	~~198.0~~	1st place, gold medalist(s)	225.0	230.0	235.0	2nd place, silver medalist(s)	430.0
2nd place, silver medalist(s)	Evgeny Shishlyannikov (RUS)	104.80	185.0	~~190.0~~	190.0	3rd place, bronze medalist(s)	222.5	227.5	235.0	1st place, gold medalist(s)	425.0
3rd place, bronze medalist(s)	Choi Jong-kun (KOR)	103.33	185.0	~~190.0~~	190.0	2nd place, silver medalist(s)	220.0	~~225.0~~	~~225.0~~	7	410.0
4	Mukhran Gogia (GEO)	103.62	175.0	182.5	187.5	4	215.0	220.0	~~225.0~~	8	407.5
5	Hossein Tavakkoli (IRI)	104.72	180.0	185.0	~~190.0~~	8	215.0	222.5	~~227.5~~	5	407.5
6	Alexandru Bratan (MDA)	102.51	180.0	185.0	~~187.5~~	6	212.5	~~220.0~~	220.0	6	405.0
7	Grzegorz Kleszcz (POL)	104.08	180.0	~~185.0~~	185.0	7	~~220.0~~	220.0	~~225.0~~	11	405.0
8	Robert Dołęga (POL)	103.67	172.5	177.5	~~182.5~~	13	220.0	225.0	~~230.0~~	3rd place, bronze medalist(s)	402.5
9	Abdulaziz Alpak (TUR)	103.69	170.0	175.0	180.0	10	215.0	222.5	~~227.5~~	4	402.5
10	Anatoly Khrapaty (KAZ)	103.91	175.0	180.0	~~185.0~~	11	210.0	~~220.0~~	220.0	9	400.0
11	Said Saif Asaad (QAT)	104.08	~~180.0~~	180.0	~~185.0~~	12	220.0	~~227.5~~	~~227.5~~	10	400.0
12	Péter Tamton (HUN)	104.66	170.0	177.5	182.5	9	~~207.5~~	207.5	215.0	14	397.5
13	Adrian Mateaș (ROM)	101.63	~~180.0~~	180.0	185.0	5	200.0	210.0	~~215.0~~	18	395.0
14	Aslan Bamataliyev (AZE)	103.25	170.0	175.0	~~180.0~~	14	205.0	~~215.0~~	215.0	13	390.0
15	Wes Barnett (USA)	104.81	170.0	~~175.0~~	~~175.0~~	21	215.0	~~220.0~~	220.0	12	390.0
16	Hisaya Yoshimoto (JPN)	104.99	170.0	175.0	~~177.5~~	19	210.0	215.0	~~220.0~~	15	390.0
17	Moreno Boer (ITA)	104.58	~~175.0~~	~~175.0~~	175.0	16	207.5	212.5	~~217.5~~	16	387.5
18	Dimitri Prochorow (GER)	104.20	~~170.0~~	170.0	175.0	15	205.0	210.0	~~215.0~~	19	385.0
19	Vladimir Yemelyanov (BLR)	104.64	175.0	~~182.5~~	~~182.5~~	17	200.0	210.0	~~220.0~~	20	385.0
20	Fabio Magrini (ITA)	104.65	162.5	167.5	170.0	20	202.5	207.5	212.5	17	382.5
21	Oļegs Jegorovs (LAT)	104.67	167.5	172.5	175.0	18	192.5	197.5	~~200.0~~	26	372.5
22	Silvio Ajfrid (AUT)	104.87	160.0	~~165.0~~	~~165.0~~	27	200.0	205.0	210.0	21	370.0
23	Tharwat Bendary (EGY)	103.89	~~165.0~~	165.0	~~170.0~~	23	200.0	~~210.0~~	~~210.0~~	23	365.0
24	Thomas Yule (GBR)	104.82	155.0	160.0	165.0	24	~~195.0~~	195.0	200.0	25	365.0
25	Kamel Naoui (TUN)	98.96	155.0	160.0	~~165.0~~	25	185.0	190.0	~~195.0~~	29	350.0
26	Cristián Escalante (CHI)	104.82	160.0	~~165.0~~	~~165.0~~	26	190.0	—	—	30	350.0
27	Su Tsung-jung (TPE)	104.64	140.0	145.0	150.0	29	180.0	192.5	195.0	27	345.0
28	Henrik Nobel (DEN)	104.72	147.5	~~152.5~~	~~152.5~~	30	175.0	182.5	185.0	32	332.5
29	Frank Pérez (DOM)	104.05	150.0	~~155.0~~	~~155.0~~	28	170.0	~~180.0~~	180.0	33	330.0
30	Rufus Adeyemi (NGR)	104.49	~~135.0~~	135.0	~~142.5~~	31	~~180.0~~	180.0	187.5	31	322.5
31	Gilbert Henricus (NED)	102.95	~~127.5~~	127.5	~~132.5~~	32	150.0	160.0	165.0	34	292.5
—	Akos Sandor (CAN)	103.06	165.0	~~170.0~~	~~170.0~~	22	—	—	—	—	—
—	Angelos Ioannou (CYP)	97.44	110.0	~~120.0~~	120.0	33	~~140.0~~	—	—	—	—
—	Andre Rohde (GER)	104.72	~~170.0~~	~~170.0~~	~~170.0~~	—	200.0	~~207.5~~	207.5	22	—
—	Valeri Sarava (GEO)	104.24	~~162.5~~	~~162.5~~	~~162.5~~	—	200.0	~~210.0~~	~~210.0~~	24	—
—	Mika Kuoksa (FIN)	104.82	~~150.0~~	~~150.0~~	~~150.0~~	—	185.0	192.5	~~200.0~~	28	—
—	David Daly (IRL)	101.47	~~122.5~~	~~122.5~~	~~122.5~~	—	155.0	~~162.5~~	~~162.5~~	35	—
—	Dave Guest (GBR)	99.31	~~152.5~~	~~152.5~~	~~155.0~~	—	—	—	—	—	—
—	Lorenzo Carrió (ESP)	102.26	~~162.5~~	~~162.5~~	~~165.0~~	—	—	—	—	—	—
—	Sergey Kopytov (KAZ)	103.38	~~175.0~~	—	—	—	—	—	—	—	—
—	Ihor Razoronov (UKR)	104.54	~~190.0~~	~~190.0~~	~~190.0~~	—	—	—	—	—	—
