= David Daly =

David Daly may refer to:

- David Daly (academic) (born 1940), American academic
- David Daly (cricketer) (1874–1944), South African cricketer
- David Daly (weightlifter) (born 1973), Irish weightlifter

== See also ==
- David Dale (disambiguation)
