= 1997 World Weightlifting Championships – Men's 108 kg =

The 1997 World Weightlifting Championships were held in Chiang Mai, Thailand from December 6 to December 14. The men's competition in the 108 kg division was staged on 14 December 1997.

== Medalists ==
| Event | Gold | | Silver | | Bronze | |
|---|---|---|---|---|---|---|
| Snatch | Cui Wenhua (CHN) | 195.0 kg | Evgeny Shishlyannikov (RUS) | 190.0 kg | Sergey Syrtsov (RUS) | 185.0 kg |
| Clean & Jerk | Cui Wenhua (CHN) | 220.0 kg | Wes Barnett (USA) | 220.0 kg | Mariusz Jędra (POL) | 217.5 kg |
| Total | Cui Wenhua (CHN) | 415.0 kg | Mariusz Jędra (POL) | 392.5 kg | Wes Barnett (USA) | 390.0 kg |

== Records ==
Prior to this competition, the existing world records were as follows.

| World record | Snatch | Timur Taymazov (UKR) | 200.0 kg | Istanbul, Turkey | 26 November 1994 |
| World record | Clean & Jerk | Timur Taymazov (UKR) | 236.0 kg | Atlanta, United States | 29 July 1996 |
| World record | Total | Timur Taymazov (UKR) | 435.0 kg | Istanbul, Turkey | 26 November 1994 |

== Results ==
| Rank | Athlete | Body weight | Snatch (kg) | | | | Clean & Jerk (kg) | | | | Total |
| Rank | Athlete | Body weight | 1 | 2 | 3 | Rank | 1 | 2 | 3 | Rank | Total |
|---|---|---|---|---|---|---|---|---|---|---|---|
| 1st place, gold medalist(s) | Cui Wenhua (CHN) | 105.70 | 190.0 | 195.0 | ~~202.5~~ | 1st place, gold medalist(s) | 210.0 | 217.5 | 220.0 | 1st place, gold medalist(s) | 415.0 |
| 2nd place, silver medalist(s) | Mariusz Jędra (POL) | 107.10 | 170.0 | ~~175.0~~ | 175.0 | 4 | 210.0 | 215.0 | 217.5 | 3rd place, bronze medalist(s) | 392.5 |
| 3rd place, bronze medalist(s) | Wes Barnett (USA) | 107.75 | 165.0 | ~~170.0~~ | 170.0 | 9 | 212.5 | ~~217.5~~ | 220.0 | 2nd place, silver medalist(s) | 390.0 |
| 4 | Dimitri Prochorow (GER) | 106.95 | 170.0 | ~~177.5~~ | ~~177.5~~ | 8 | 207.5 | 215.0 | ~~220.0~~ | 5 | 385.0 |
| 5 | Hisaya Yoshimoto (JPN) | 106.25 | 165.0 | 170.0 | 172.5 | 5 | 205.0 | 210.0 | ~~217.5~~ | 6 | 382.5 |
| 6 | Moreno Boer (ITA) | 108.00 | 165.0 | 170.0 | 172.5 | 7 | 200.0 | 205.0 | ~~207.5~~ | 7 | 377.5 |
| 7 | Chung Dae-jin (KOR) | 106.55 | 160.0 | ~~170.0~~ | — | 10 | ~~215.0~~ | 215.0 | ~~220.0~~ | 4 | 375.0 |
| 8 | Oļegs Jegorovs (LAT) | 107.25 | 167.5 | 172.5 | ~~175.0~~ | 6 | 192.5 | ~~200.0~~ | 200.0 | 8 | 372.5 |
| — | Evgeny Shishlyannikov (RUS) | 106.35 | 185.0 | 190.0 | ~~195.0~~ | 2nd place, silver medalist(s) | — | — | — | — | — |
| — | Sergey Syrtsov (RUS) | 105.00 | 185.0 | ~~190.0~~ | ~~190.0~~ | 3rd place, bronze medalist(s) | ~~220.0~~ | ~~220.0~~ | ~~220.0~~ | — | — |
| — | Delroy McQueen (GBR) | 106.05 | ~~147.5~~ | ~~147.5~~ | ~~147.5~~ | — | ~~190.0~~ | — | — | — | — |
