= Muniswamy Rajgopal =

Indian field hockey player (1926–2004)

Personal information
- Born: 24 March 1926 Bangalore, Kingdom of Mysore (now in Karnataka, India)
- Died: 3 March 2004 (aged 77) Bangalore, India

Sport
- Sport: Field hockey
- Position: Forward
Senior career
Years	Team	Caps	Goals
–	Hindustan Aircraft	-	-
National team
Years	Team	Caps	Goals
–	India		-
Medal record
Men's field hockey
Representing India
Olympic Games
Gold medal – first place	1952 Helsinki	Team competition

Muniswamy Rajgopal (24 March 1926 – 3 March 2004) was an Indian field hockey player. He was a member of the India national team that won gold medal at the 1952 Helsinki Olympics. He was from his home State of Mysore (now Karnataka) to win an Olympic medal.

Rajgopal was a versatile player and played as a wing forward or inside-right on either wings. He was nicknamed 'the artful dodger' for his stickwork. Rajgopal's contributions to hockey was recognized with Karnataka's Rajyotsava Award in 2000.

== Career ==
=== As player ===
A member of the Mysore team for 15 years from 1945 that competed in the national championships, Rajgopal was also an instrumental part of his employers' team, Hindustan Aircraft (now Hindustan Aeronautics). With the team, he won the Beighton Cup in 1951, defeating Pakistan's Lahore Bata 1–0 in the final. He toured East Africa twice, first with the undivided Indian team in 1945, and with the Indian team post-independence in 1947–48. He played alongside Dhyan Chand in the forward line for India and drew frequent comparisons to him from the press. He was called 'Dhyan Chand of the Deccan'. India scored 13 goals in the gold medal-winning campaign of the 1952 Helsinki Olympics and teammate Balbir Singh Sr. remarked, "We couldn't have got many of the goals, but for the presence of Rajagopal."

With the Indian team, Rajgopal also toured South India and Ceylon in 1947, Africa in 1952 and Malaya and Singapore in 1954. In the 1954 tour, he scored ten goals in 11 matches played. His game drew comparisons to Dhyan Chand and the Malayan press labeled him 'another Chand'.

=== As coach ===
Known for his sharp hockey acumen, Rajgopal was also the coach of the State teams, in various age-groups on numerous occasions, the most notable among them the 1975 Junior Nationals triumph in Pune. He was also the coach of the national team in the inaugural Junior World Cup tournament held in Paris in 1979.
