= Indian field hockey team in Malaya and Singapore =

Tournament details
- Host country: Federation of Malaya; Colony of Singapore
- Dates: 11 February – 10 March 1954

Tournament statistics
- Matches played: 16
- Goals scored: 128 (8 per match)
- Top scorer: Balbir Singh Sr. (44 goals)

An Indian field hockey team toured the Federation of Malaya and the Colony of Singapore between 11 February and 10 March 1954. The Indian Hockey Federation XI (IHF XI) played 16 games out of which three were international fixtures. India won all 16 matches, scoring a total of 121 goals. Captain of the touring side Balbir Singh Sr. finished with most goals (44), while Susainathan scored 25 and vice-captain Randhir Singh Gentle, 14.

== Background ==
The idea of inviting an India team to Malaya was first mooted in 1949 and officially expressed by G. E. N. Oehlers, then president of the Malayan Hockey Council (MHC). In November 1952, the MHC wrote to the Government of India inviting a team in 1954. It suggested that the touring side include five or six national team players and that the side play nine games in Malaya and three in Singapore. However, this was the second tour of Malaya by an Indian team; the first by the 1932 Los Angeles Olympics gold-winning national team that had toured the same year just before the Olympic Games. They played All-Malaya XI and beat them 7–0.

== Squad ==
A 16-member Indian squad for the tour was named on 30 October 1953. Balbir Singh Sr. was named captain of the side and Randhir Singh Gentle, the vice-captain. The squad included six players from the team that won gold at the 1952 Helsinki Olympics. The squad arrived on 9 February 1954.

The touring squad included:

Key

GK = Goalkeeper, FB = Fullback, HB = Halfback, FW = Forward

Pos.	Player	Age	Club
GK	Ranganathan Francis	34	
GK	Ram Prakash		
FB	Randhir Singh Gentle (vc)	32	
FB	Abid Ali Rizvi	32	United Provinces
FB	Bakshish Singh	25	Punjab
FB	Leslie Claudius	26	Bengal Nagpur Railway
HB	O. P. Malhotra		United Provinces
HB	Albert Middlecoat	29	Bombay
HB	T. M. Padavat		Mysore
HB	Joseph de Mello		Bombay, Tata
FW	Raghbir Singh Bhola		Delhi, Sanaspur SC
FW	I. Susainathan	28	Madras Police
FW	Muniswamy Rajgopal	27	Mysore
FW	Bhaskaran	24	Mysore
FW	Balbir Singh Sr. (c)	30	
FW	Raghbir Lal	33	

== Fixtures ==
11 February 1954

India	3–1	Singapore
Gentle 12'; Bal. Singh Sr. 35', 69'	Report	Dozey 40'

Jalan Besar Stadium, Singapore
Attendance: 6,000
Umpires:
G. A. Tessensohn (SIN)
Ram Prakash (IND)

13 February 1954

IHF XI	7–1	South Malaya
Bhola 12', ?'; Rajgopal 21', 67'; Bal. Singh Sr. ?', 70'; Susainathan 68'	Report	Dozey 36'

Jalan Besar Stadium, Singapore
Attendance: 5,200
Umpires:
Randhir Singh Gentle (IND)
G. A. Tessensohn (SIN)

15 February 1954

IHF XI	10–0	Malacca
Susainathan 8'; Bal. Singh Sr. 14', 35', 40', 42', 50', ?', ?'; Bhaskaran 18'; Bhola 29'	Report

Malaya
Attendance: 4,000
Umpires:
V. Hicks (MAL)
Ranganathan Francis (IND)

17 February 1954
17:15

IHF XI	4–1	Negeri Sembilan
Rajgopal ?', 3?', 57'; Bhola 55'	Report	Noordin ?'

Station Padang, Seremban, Malaya
Attendance: 5,000
Umpires:
Ram Prakash (IND)
W. Harben

18 February 1954

IHF XI	8–0	Selangor
Susainathan 6', 14'; Bal. Singh Sr. 8', ?', ?', 69'; Gentle 48'; Rajgopal ?'	Report

Malaya
Umpires:
Ram Prakash (IND)
L. S. Greening

20 February 1954

India	14–2	Malaya
Bal. Singh Sr. 5 goals' Susainathan 4 goals' Gentle 3 goals' Malhotra; Bhola	Report	EJ Van Lidth; Coutts

Malaya

23 February 1954

IHF XI	2–0	Perak
Bhola 43', ?'	Report

Malaya

25 February 1954

IHF XI	13–0	Federation of Malaya XI
Bal. Singh Sr. 3', 11'; Gentle 8', ?', ?'; Susainathan 29', 31', ?'; Rajgopal 36'; Middlecoat ?'	Report

Chinese Assembly Hall Ground, Ipoh, Malaya
Umpires:
Bakshish Singh (IND)
M. Muthucumaru

27 February 1954

IHF XI	12–0	Penang
Rajgopal 3'; Bal. Singh Sr. 5', ?', ?', ?', ?', 58', 65', ?'; Susainathan ?', ?', ?'	Report

4,000
Attendance: Western Road Ground, Penang, Malaya

28 February 1954

IHF XI	7–1	North Malaya
Middlecoat ?', 56'; Gentle 45', ?'; Bhola 46'; Malhotra 52', 63'	Report	Arul ?'

Chinese Assembly Hall Ground, Ipoh, Malaya
Umpires:
Ram Prakash
V. T. Durai

2 March 1954

IHF XI	4–0*	Pahang
Susainathan 5'; Bhola 9', ?' de Mello ?'	Report

Headquarters Malaya Ground, Kuala Lumpur, Malaya
Umpires:
Ranganathan Francis (IND)
Gurmukh Singh (IND)

3 March 1954

IHF XI	8–0	Negeri Sembilan
Gentle 7'; Susainathan 22', ?', ?'; Bal. Singh Sr. ?', ?', ?'; Raghbir Lal ?'	Report

Station Padang, Malaya
Attendance: 5,000

4 March 1954

IHF XI	4–0*	MHC President's XI
Bal. Singh Sr. 19', 35', 46', 52'	Report

Headquarters Malaya Ground, Kuala Lumpur, Malaya
Umpires:
S. Mackenzie
S. Sockanathan

6 March 1954

India	6–0	Malaya
Rajgopal 3', 33'; Susainathan ?', 19', ?'; Bal. Singh Sr. 64'	Report

Jalan Besar Stadium, Singapore
Umpires:
M. Muthukumaru
B. S. Soin

8 March 1954

IHF XI	8–1	Malayan Indians
Rajgopal 17'; Bal. Singh Sr. 22', ?', ?'; Malhotra 23', ?'; Susainathan 28', 63'	Report	J. Vohra 39'

Jalan Besar Stadium, Singapore
Attendance: 2,000
Umpires:
G. A. Tessensohn (SIN)
M. Muthucumaru

10 March 1954

IHF XI	11–0	Johore
Gentle 6', 36', 41'; Lal 13', ?', 51', 28'; Bhola 20'; Susainathan 32', 50'; Malhotra 55'	Report

Jalan Besar Stadium, Singapore
Attendance: 1,500
Umpires:
J. C. Smith
F. A. Milne

- Match was stopped after 25 and 65 minutes of play respectively due to rain.

== See also ==
- India–Malaysia field hockey record
- Sport in Malaysia
- Sport in Singapore
