= Valentin Manushev =

Uzbekistani weightlifter (born 1967)

Personal information
- Nationality: Uzbekistani
- Born: 16 August 1967 (age 57)

Sport
- Sport: Weightlifting

Valentin Manushev (born 16 August 1967) is an Uzbekistani weightlifter. He competed in the men's heavyweight II event at the 1996 Summer Olympics.
