= Raghbir Singh Bhola =

Indian field hockey player

Group Captain Raghbir Singh Bhola
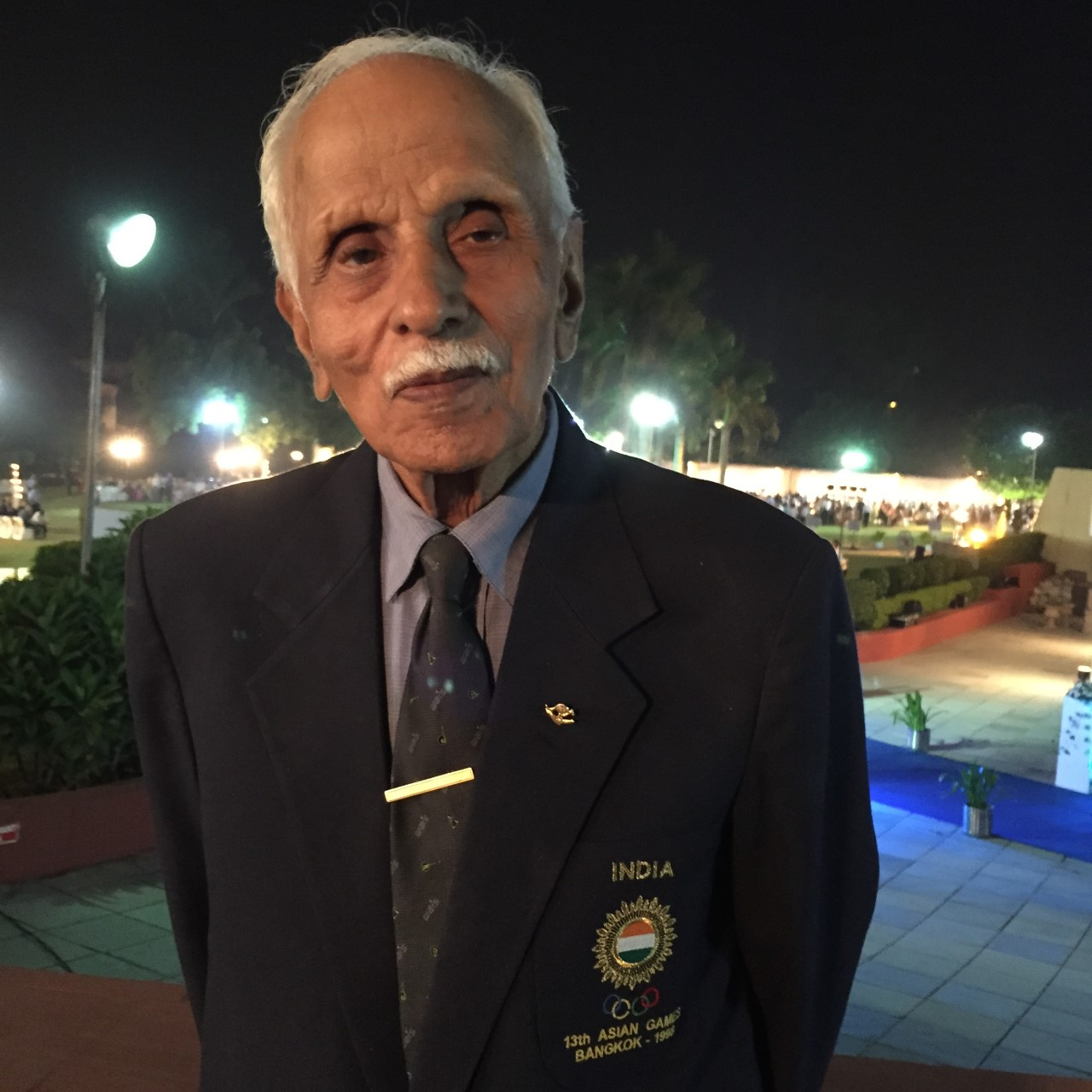
- Ragbhir Singh Bhola at the 1998 Asian Games
- Born: Raghbir Singh Bhola; 18 August 1927; Multan, Pakistan
- Died: 21 January 2019 (aged 91); New Delhi, India
- Military career
- Allegiance: India
- Branch: Indian Air Force
- Service years: 1952-1978
- Rank: Group Captain
- Unit: AE(L)
- Sports career
- Height: 6 ft (183 cm)
- Sport: Field hockey
- Position: Left winger
Medal record
Men's Field Hockey
Representing India
Olympic Games
Gold medal – first place	1956 Melbourne	Team competition
Silver medal – second place	1960 Rome	Team competition

Raghbir Singh Bhola (18 August 1927 – 21 January 2019) was an Indian Airforce officer and international hockey player who represented India in the 1956 Melbourne and 1960 Rome Olympics, winning a gold and silver medal, respectively. He was also awarded the Arjuna Award for his contributions to Indian hockey in 2000.

== Early life and education ==
Bhola, was born in a middle-class family in Multan (now Pakistan); his ancestors belonged to Pind Dadan Khan and his grandparents moved to Multan around the end of the 18th Century. He went to the Government Model High School, in Khanewal, Pakistan. Growing up in Khanewal, without electricity and only one communal water pump, his father used to wake-up the family early to collect water everyday and do other chores around the house. After graduating from high school, he moved to New Delhi for higher studies, where he studied Electrical Engineering from the Delhi College of Engineering, now known as Delhi Technological University (DTU). After completing his Electrical Engineering from DCE, he joined the Indian Air Force in February 1952. In 1962, Bhola was selected by the Indian Air Force to undergo a two-year post graduation course in Electrical Engineering at the College of Aeronautics, Carnfield University, UK which he completed successfully.

== Domestic hockey career ==
Government Model High School, in Khanewal, was known for its sporting facilities and Bhola thus developed an interest in sports. The standards were high, however, and he got a chance to play only when the senior players did not turn up. His interest in sports was furthered by Dr. Khuda Baksh Awan, who encouraged him to play with his children. Bhola was a part of the Government Model High School Field Hockey team that won the Interschool XI Championship. When he moved to New Delhi, for higher studies, he represented D.A.V High School, Paharganj. He also played hockey for the Brothers Club at the intercollegiate level. While undergoing training at the Air Force Technical College, Banglore he was inducted into the Services Hockey team to play in the National Hockey Championship in March 1953. The services team won the National Hockey Championship for the first time, this was the beginning of Field Hockey career at the National Level. From 1954 to 1960 Bhola captained the Indian Airforce Hockey and Services Hockey team, except in 1956, and won the Inter Services Hockey Championship thrice and the National Hockey Championship twice.

== Participation in the Olympics ==
=== 1956 Melbourne Olympics ===
Bhola was part of the 1956 Melbourne Olympics Indian Field Hockey squad. The team was captained by Balbir Singh and defeated Afghanistan 14 goals to 0, the United States 16-0 and Singapore 6-0 in the group stage and Germany 1-0 in the semifinals. India defeated Pakistan in the final 1-0, and brought home the gold medal.

=== 1960 Rome Olympics ===
Bhola was the only player to be selected from the Services Selection Board (SSB) for the Indian Field Hockey National Team to participate in a goodwill tour of Singapore and Malaysia in February 1954. In 1959, he was again selected to play on a goodwill tour of Egypt, Italy, Spain and Germany, in preparation for the 1960 Rome Olympics. For the 1960 Rome Olympics, the team was captained by Anglo-Indian Leslie Claudius. Bhola scored a total of 6 goals in the tournament: three goals against Denmark, one against Holland, one against New Zealand and the only goal (scored in extra time) against Australia in the quarterfinals. Bhola's extra-time penalty corner goal against Australia carried India into the semifinal where they beat Great Britain (1-0). India and Pakistan reached the finals again. Pakistan scored a goal in the first 10 minutes of the game after which India made several attempts to even the score, but were unsuccessful due to good saves by the Pakistan goalie. In the last 4 minutes of the game, Bhola got the ball, dodged right-half, right-front back, entered the shooting circle and took a left hand stroke at the goal, missing the mark by six inches. India lost to Pakistan and got a silver medal.

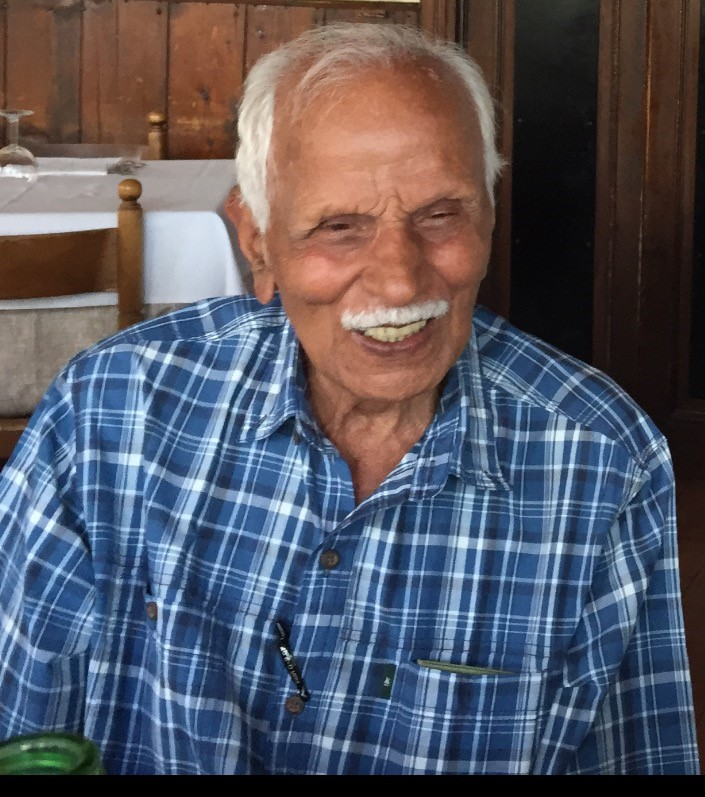
