= Cui Wenhua =

Chinese weightlifter (born 1974)

Personal information
- Full name: Cui Wenhua
- Born: 28 January 1974 (age 52)
- Height: 188 cm (6 ft 2 in)
- Weight: 102.92 kg (226.9 lb)

Sport
- Country: China
- Sport: Weightlifting
- Weight class: 105 kg
- Team: National team
Medal record
Men's weightlifting
Representing China
World Championships
Silver medal – second place	1998 Lahti	–105 kg
Gold medal – first place	1997 Chiang Mai	–108 kg
Silver medal – second place	1995 Guangzhou	–108 kg

Cui Wenhua (崔 文華, born 28 January 1974) is a Chinese male weightlifter, competing in the 105 kg category and representing China at international competitions. He participated at the 1996 Summer Olympics in the 108 kg event. He competed at world championships, most recently at the 1998 World Weightlifting Championships.

He set an Asian record in the Snatch 14 November 1998 of 195 kg and a month later he set Asian Games records in the Snatch also of 195 kg and a total score record of 410.0 kg.

== Major results ==
(silver) - 1995 World Championships Heavyweight class (407.5 kg)
(gold) - 1997 World Championships Heavyweight class (415.0 kg)
(gold) - 1994 Asian Games Heavyweight class
(gold) - 1998 Asian Games Heavyweight class
(silver) - 2002 Asian Games Heavyweight class

Year	Venue	Weight	Snatch (kg)				Clean & Jerk (kg)				Total	Rank
Year	Venue	Weight	1	2	3	Rank	1	2	3	Rank	Total	Rank
Summer Olympics
1996	Atlanta, United States	108 kg				—N/a				—N/a		5
World Championships
1998	Lahti, Finland	105 kg	190	195	~~198~~	1st place, gold medalist(s)	215	220	225	3rd place, bronze medalist(s)	420	2nd place, silver medalist(s)
