= Sergey Flerko =

Russian weightlifter (born 1972)

Personal information
- Full name: Sergei Flerko
- Born: 3 August 1972 (age 53) Tula, Russia
- Height: 184 cm (6 ft 0 in)
- Weight: 128.44 kg (283.2 lb)

Sport
- Country: Russia
- Sport: Weightlifting
- Weight class: +105 kg
- Club: CSKA Tula, Tula (RUS)
- Team: National team
- Updated on 3 October 2016

Sergei Flerko (Сергей Флерко, born 3 August 1972 in Tula) is a Russian male weightlifter, competing in the +105 kg category and representing Russia at international competitions. He participated at the 1996 Summer Olympics in the 108 kg event. He competed at world championships, most recently at the 1999 World Weightlifting Championships.

== Major results ==
(bronze) - 1995 World Championships Heavyweight class (405.0 kg)
(bronze) - 1995 European Championships Heavyweight class (400.0 kg)

Year	Venue	Weight	Snatch (kg)				Clean & Jerk (kg)				Total	Rank
Year	Venue	Weight	1	2	3	Rank	1	2	3	Rank	Total	Rank
Summer Olympics
1996	Atlanta, United States	108 kg				—N/a				—N/a		DNF
World Championships
1999	Piraeus, Greece	+105 kg	187.5	192.5	195	7	232.5	~~240~~	~~240~~	12	427.5	8
