= Konstantine Starikovitch =

American weightlifter

Personal information
- Nationality: American
- Born: March 20, 1966 (age 60) Podolsk, Russia

Sport
- Sport: Weightlifting

Konstantine Starikovitch (born March 20, 1968) is an American weightlifter. He competed in the men's heavyweight II event at the 1996 Summer Olympics.
