= O. P. Malhotra =

Indian field hockey player

Personal information
- Full name: Om Prakash Malhotra
- Born: United Provinces, British India

Sport
- Sport: Field hockey
- Position: Halfback
National team
Years	Team	Caps	Goals
–	India		-
Medal record
Men's field hockey
Olympic Games
Representing India
Gold medal – first place	1956 Melbourne	Team

Om Prakash Malhotra was an Indian field hockey player who played as a halfback. He was part of the India national team that won gold at the 1956 Melbourne Olympics. He was a member of the Indian team that toured Afghanistan in 1952 and Malaya and Singapore in 1954. He also played for his State team United Provinces in the Indian national championships.
