= Mario Kalinke =

German weightlifter

Personal information
- Born: 7 January 1974 (age 51) Rostock, East Germany
- Height: 178 cm (5 ft 10 in)
- Weight: 98.25 kg (216.6 lb)

Sport
- Country: Germany
- Sport: Weightlifting
- Weight class: 99 kg
- Club: TSV 1860 Stralsund, Stralsund (GER)
- Team: National team
- Updated on 5 October 2016

Mario Kalinke (born 7 January 1974 in Rostock) is a German male weightlifter, competing in the 99 kg category and representing Germany at international competitions. He participated at the 1996 Summer Olympics in the 108 kg event. He competed at world championships, including the 1997 World Weightlifting Championships.

== Major results ==
Year	Venue	Weight	Snatch (kg)				Clean & Jerk (kg)				Total	Rank
Year	Venue	Weight	1	2	3	Rank	1	2	3	Rank	Total	Rank
Summer Olympics
1996	Atlanta, United States	108 kg				—N/a				—N/a		9
World Championships
1997	Chiang Mai, Thailand	99 kg	~~165.0~~	165.0	~~167.5~~	7	190.0	202.5	205.0	8	370.0	8
