= Shirish Rummun =

Mauritian weightlifter

Personal information
- Nationality: Mauritian
- Born: 8 July 1971 (age 53)

Sport
- Sport: Weightlifting

Shirish Rummun (born 8 July 1971) is a Mauritian weightlifter. He competed in the men's heavyweight II event at the 1996 Summer Olympics.
