= Oleng Panatidis =

Greek weightlifter (born 1971)

Personal information
- Nationality: Greek
- Born: 29 January 1971 (age 54)

Sport
- Sport: Weightlifting

Oleng Panatidis (born 29 January 1971) is a Greek weightlifter. He competed in the men's heavyweight II event at the 1996 Summer Olympics.
