= Deivan Valencia =

Colombian weightlifter

Personal information
- Full name: Deivan Javier Valencia Hernández
- Born: 12 June 1976 (age 50)
- Weight: 103.55 kg (228.3 lb)

Sport
- Country: Colombia
- Sport: Weightlifting
- Weight class: 105 kg
- Team: National team
- Updated on 4 October 2016

Deivan Javier Valencia Hernández (born 12 June 1976) is a Colombian male weightlifter, competing in the 105 kg category and representing Colombia at international competitions. He participated at the 1996 Summer Olympics in the 99 kg event. He competed at world championships, most recently at the 1998 World Weightlifting Championships.

== Major results ==
Year	Venue	Weight	Snatch (kg)				Clean & Jerk (kg)				Total	Rank
Year	Venue	Weight	1	2	3	Rank	1	2	3	Rank	Total	Rank
Summer Olympics
1996	Atlanta, United States	99 kg				—N/a				—N/a		18
World Championships
1998	Lahti, Finland	105 kg	155	~~160~~	160	21	195	200	~~205~~	17	360	18
