= Mihai Vihodet =

Moldovan weightlifter

Personal information
- Nationality: Moldovan
- Born: 6 June 1975 (age 49)

Sport
- Sport: Weightlifting

Mihai Vihodet (born 6 June 1975) is a Moldovan weightlifter. He competed in the men's heavyweight I event at the 1996 Summer Olympics.
