= Weightlifting at the 1996 Summer Olympics – Men's 108 kg =

Weightlifting at the Olympics

Men's 108 kg at the Games of the XXVI Olympiad
- Venue: Georgia World Congress Center
- Date: 29 July 1996
- Competitors: 24 from 18 nations
- Winning total: 430.0 kg

Medalists
1st place, gold medalist(s)		Tymur Taimazov	Ukraine
2nd place, silver medalist(s)		Sergey Syrtsov	Russia
3rd place, bronze medalist(s)		Nicu Vlad	Romania

These are the results of the men's 108 kg competition in weightlifting at the 1996 Summer Olympics in Atlanta. A total number of 24 athletes entered this event. The weightlifter from Ukraine won the gold, with a combined lift of 430 kg.

== Results ==
Each weightlifter had three attempts for both the snatch and clean and jerk lifting methods. The total of the best successful lift of each method was used to determine the final rankings and medal winners.

Rank	Athlete	Group	Body weight	Snatch (kg)				Clean & Jerk (kg)				Total
Rank	Athlete	Group	Body weight	1	2	3	Result	1	2	3	Result	Total
1st place, gold medalist(s)	Timour Taimazov (UKR)	A	107.32	190.0	195.0	~~197.5~~	195.0	227.5	235.0	~~240.0~~	235.0	430.0
2nd place, silver medalist(s)	Sergey Syrtsov (RUS)	A	107.22	185.0	190.0	195.0	195.0	225.0	~~230.0~~	~~230.0~~	225.0	420.0
3rd place, bronze medalist(s)	Nicu Vlad (ROU)	A	107.70	190.0	195.0	197.5	197.5	222.5	~~227.5~~	~~230.0~~	222.5	420.0
4	Vladimir Yemelyanov (BLR)	A	107.41	180.0	~~187.5~~	187.5	187.5	215.0	~~220.0~~	220.0	220.0	407.5
5	Cui Wenhua (CHN)	A	102.52	~~190.0~~	190.0	~~195.0~~	190.0	215.0	~~220.0~~	~~220.0~~	215.0	405.0
6	Wes Barnett (USA)	A	107.88	165.0	170.0	175.0	175.0	215.0	220.0	~~225.0~~	220.0	395.0
7	Ara Vardanian (ARM)	A	107.93	~~180.0~~	180.0	~~185.0~~	180.0	~~215.0~~	215.0	~~220.0~~	215.0	395.0
8	Dariusz Osuch (POL)	A	105.70	170.0	175.0	177.5	177.5	215.0	~~220.0~~	~~220.0~~	215.0	392.5
9	Mario Kalinke (GER)	B	102.30	170.0	175.0	177.5	177.5	207.5	212.5	~~215.0~~	212.5	390.0
10	Viktors Ščerbatihs (LAT)	B	107.17	172.5	~~177.5~~	177.5	177.5	205.0	212.5	~~217.5~~	212.5	390.0
11	Dimitri Prochorow (GER)	B	107.32	170.0	175.0	~~180.0~~	175.0	210.0	215.0	~~220.0~~	215.0	390.0
12	Konstantine Starikovitch (USA)	A	106.90	~~170.0~~	170.0	177.5	177.5	210.0	~~217.5~~	~~217.5~~	210.0	387.5
13	Chun Sang-suk (KOR)	B	107.93	162.5	167.5	170.0	170.0	202.5	210.0	~~215.0~~	210.0	380.0
14	Janne Kanerva (FIN)	B	107.44	160.0	~~165.0~~	~~167.5~~	160.0	200.0	~~210.0~~	~~210.0~~	200.0	360.0
15	Hisaya Yoshimoto (JPN)	B	107.92	150.0	162.5	170.0	170.0	190.0	~~200.0~~	~~200.0~~	190.0	360.0
16	Valentin Manushev (UZB)	B	107.81	~~160.0~~	160.0	~~165.0~~	160.0	190.0	~~200.0~~	~~200.0~~	190.0	350.0
17	Nopadol Wanwang (THA)	B	107.33	135.0	140.0	~~145.0~~	140.0	172.5	177.5	~~180.0~~	177.5	317.5
18	Shirish Rummun (MRI)	B	107.89	120.0	132.5	~~142.5~~	132.5	140.0	155.0	–	155.0	287.5
19	Ali Kavuma (UGA)	B	106.95	105.0	110.0	~~115.0~~	110.0	140.0	145.0	150.0	150.0	260.0
	Sergey Flerko (RUS)	A	107.90	180.0	~~185.0~~	185.0	185.0	~~220.0~~	~~220.0~~	~~225.0~~	–	–
	Mukhran Gogia (GEO)	A	106.16	–	–	–	–	–	–	–	–	–
	Oleng Panatidis (GRE)	B	107.88	~~170.0~~	~~170.0~~	~~170.0~~	–	–	–	–	–	–
	Ihor Razoronov (UKR)	A	106.90	~~187.5~~	–	–	–	–	–	–	–	–
	Gennady Shchekalo (BLR)	A	107.27	~~172.5~~	172.5	175.0	175.0	~~212.5~~	~~215.5~~	~~215.0~~	–	–

== Sources ==
- "Official Olympic Report". International Olympic Committee. Archived from the original on 12 June 2007.
