= Valeri Sarava =

Georgian weightlifter

Valeriane "Valeri" Sarava (born January 16, 1978) is a retired male weightlifter from Georgia. He qualified for the 2000 Summer Olympics in Sydney, Australia, where he ended up in 16th place in the men's super heavyweight division (+ 105 kg). He stayed in Australia, took out Australian citizenship, and won a silver medal in the men's heavyweight division (105 kg) at the 2006 Commonwealth Games in Melbourne.

== Major results ==
Year	Venue	Weight	Snatch (kg)				Clean & Jerk (kg)				Total	Rank
Year	Venue	Weight	1	2	3	Rank	1	2	3	Rank	Total	Rank
Representing Australia
Commonwealth Games
2006	Melbourne, Australia	105 kg	142	147	150	2	180	183	~~195~~	2	333	2nd place, silver medalist(s)
Representing Georgia
Olympic Games
2000	Sydney, Australia	+105 kg	~~170.0~~	170.0	~~177.5~~	18	210.0	215.0	~~220.0~~	15	385.0	16
World Championships
1999	Athens, Greece	105 kg	~~162.5~~	~~162.5~~	~~162.5~~	—	200.0	~~210.0~~	~~210.0~~	24	—	—
Junior World Championships
1998	Sofia, Bulgaria	105 kg	150.0	155.0	160.0	5	185.0	192.5	~~197.5~~	5	352.5	4
1995	Warsaw, Poland	91 kg	140.0	145.0	150.0	8	170.0	175.0	~~180.0~~	11	325.0	10
