= Weightlifting at the 2006 Commonwealth Games – Men's 105 kg =

Weightlifting – Men's 105 kg at the 2006 Commonwealth Games
- Venue: Melbourne Exhibition Centre
- Dates: 22 March 2006
- Competitors: 13 from 10 nations
- Winning total weight: 341

Medalists
gold medal	Akos Sandor	Canada
silver medal	Valeri Sarava	Australia
bronze medal	Mohd Che Mat	Malaysia

The Men's 105 kg weightlifting event at the 2006 Commonwealth Games took place at the Melbourne Exhibition Centre on 22 March 2006. The weightlifter from Canada won the gold, lifting a total weight of 341 kg.

== Schedule ==
All times are Australian Eastern Standard Time (UTC+10)

Date	Time	Event
22 March 2006	18:30	Group A

== Records ==
Prior to this competition, the existing world, Commonwealth and Games records were as follows:

World record	Snatch	Marcin Dołęga (POL)	198 kg	Havířov, Czech Republic	4 June 2002
World record	Clean & Jerk	World Standard	242 kg	–	1 January 1998
World record	Total	World Standard	440 kg	–	1 January 1998
Commonwealth record	Snatch	Aleksander Karapetyan (AUS)	175 kg	Melbourne, Australia	30 October 2004
Commonwealth record	Clean & Jerk	Aleksander Karapetyan (AUS)	210 kg	Melbourne, Australia	17 March 2002
Commonwealth record	Total	Akos Sandor (CAN)	377 kg	Shreveport, United States	16 April 2000
Games record	Snatch	Akos Sandor (CAN)	167 kg	Kuala Lumpur, Malaysia	19 September 1998
Games record	Clean & Jerk	Delroy McQueen (ENG)	210 kg	Manchester, United Kingdom	31 July 2002
Games record	Total	Delroy McQueen (ENG)	375 kg	Manchester, United Kingdom	31 July 2002

== Results ==
Rank	Athlete	Nation	Group	Body weight	Snatch (kg)				Clean & Jerk (kg)				Total
Rank	Athlete	Nation	Group	Body weight	1	2	3	Result	1	2	3	Result	Total
1st place, gold medalist(s)	Akos Sandor	Canada	A	104.98	150	~~154~~	~~155~~	150	191	~~196~~	~~196~~	191	341
2nd place, silver medalist(s)	Valeri Sarava	Australia	A	104.70	142	147	150	150	180	183	~~195~~	183	333
3rd place, bronze medalist(s)	Mohd Che Mat	Malaysia	A	104.13	~~146~~	146	148	148	~~182~~	~~182~~	182	182	330
4	Gurbinder Cheema	England	A	104.77	147	152	~~155~~	152	178	~~182~~	~~182~~	178	330
5	Sajjad Amin Malik	Pakistan	A	102.48	142	~~147~~	148	148	175	180	~~183~~	180	328
6	Niusila Opeloge	Samoa	A	103.35	135	140	~~143~~	140	175	~~182~~	~~190~~	175	315
7	Tavita Tuuamaalii	Samoa	A	104.39	135	~~140~~	~~140~~	135	175	~~182~~	~~182~~	175	310
8	Ivorn McKnee	Barbados	A	100.28	125	~~132~~	~~140~~	125	170	~~180~~	~~180~~	170	295
9	Sam Pera Jr.	Cook Islands	A	104.20	123	~~130~~	132	132	155	161	~~168~~	161	293
10	Sam Pera	Cook Islands	A	104.58	120	~~125~~	126	126	~~150~~	150	155	155	281
11	Sudesh Narayana	Sri Lanka	A	98.02	105	110	~~115~~	110	125	135	~~140~~	135	245
12	Anthony Soalla-Bell	Sierra Leone	A	103.54	90	~~100~~	~~100~~	90	125	~~130~~	~~130~~	125	215
–	Ranjith Kumara	Sri Lanka	A	96.74	~~125~~	~~130~~	~~130~~	–	–	–	–	–	–
