= Randhir Singh Gentle =

Indian field hockey player (1922–1981)

Personal information
- Born: 22 September 1922 Delhi, India
- Died: 25 September 1981 (aged 59)

Sport
- Sport: Field hockey
- Position: Fullback
National team
Years	Team	Caps	Goals
–	India		-
Medal record
Men's Field hockey
Representing India
Olympic Games
Gold medal – first place	1948 London	Team
Gold medal – first place	1952 Helsinki	Team
Gold medal – first place	1956 Melbourne	Team

Randhir Singh Gentle (22 September 1922 – 25 September 1981) was an Indian field hockey player and coach. He was part of the Indian team that won three consecutive gold medals in the Summer Olympics, from 1948 to 1956. Gentle is one of only seven Indians to have won three gold medals at the Games, all of them in men's field hockey.

== Career ==
Gentle played for India at three Olympic Games, in London in 1948, in Helsinki in 1952 and in Melbourne in 1956. He captained the Indian team at the Melbourne Olympics, following the injury of captain Balbir Singh Sr. in the first game of the league phase against Afghanistan. Gentle finished the tournament scoring six goals, including the winning goal against Pakistan in the final that Indian won 1–0. In the 38th minute, he converted a short corner to goal. India finished the tournament scoring 38 goals and not conceding a single goal.

With the team, he toured East Africa, New Zealand, Australia, Japan and parts of Europe. He was vice-captain of the Indian Hockey Federation XI (IHF XI) side that toured Malaya and Singapore in 1954. The IHF XI won all 16 games played, with Gentle scoring 14 goals in the tour.

He was the head coach of the India hockey team at the 1973 and 1978 Hockey World Cup and the Uganda national hockey team at the 1972 Summer Olympics.

== See also ==
- List of Indian hockey captains in Olympics
