= Evgeny Shishlyannikov =

Russian weightlifter (born 1975)

Personal information
- Full name: Yevgeny Aleksandrovich Shishlyannikov
- Born: 7 February 1975 (age 51) Irkutsk, Russia
- Height: 180 cm (5 ft 11 in)
- Weight: 104.80 kg (231.0 lb)

Sport
- Country: Russia
- Sport: Weightlifting
- Weight class: 105 kg
- Club: SKA Chita, Chita (RUS)
- Team: National team
- Updated on 3 October 2016

Yevgeny Aleksandrovich Shishlyannikov also written as Evgeny Shishlyannikov and Evgueni Chichliannikov (Евгений Александрович Шишлянников, born 7 February 1975 in Irkutsk) is a Russian male weightlifter, competing in the 105 kg category and representing Russia at international competitions. He competed at the 1998 and 1999 World Weightlifting Championships, most recently competing at the 1999 World Weightlifting Championships. He participated at the 2000 Summer Olympics in the 105 kg event.

== Major results ==
(gold) - 1996 European Championships Heavyweight class (405.0 kg)
(silver) - 1997 European Championships Heavyweight class (415.0 kg)
(silver) - 1998 European Championships Heavyweight class (400.0 kg)
(bronze) - 2000 European Championships Heavyweight class (410.0 kg)

Year	Venue	Weight	Snatch (kg)				Clean & Jerk (kg)				Total	Rank
Year	Venue	Weight	1	2	3	Rank	1	2	3	Rank	Total	Rank
Summer Olympics
2000	Sydney, Australia	105 kg				—N/a				—N/a		DNF
World Championships
1999	Piraeus, Greece	105 kg	185	~~190~~	190	3rd place, bronze medalist(s)	222.5	227.5	235	1st place, gold medalist(s)	425	2nd place, silver medalist(s)
1998	Lahti, Finland	105 kg	185	190	~~195~~	4	220	~~227.5~~	~~232.5~~	7	410	4
