= Denys Hotfrid =

Ukrainian weightlifter (born 1975)

Personal information
- Full name: Denys Rudolfovych Hotfrid
- Born: 5 February 1975 (age 51) Magnitogorsk, Chelyabinsk Oblast, Russian SSR, Soviet Union
- Height: 1.71 m (5 ft 7 in)
- Weight: 104 kg (229 lb)
- Spouse: Anastasiia Hotfrid

Sport
- Country: Ukraine
- Sport: Weightlifting
- Weight class: 99 kg 105 kg

Achievements and titles
- Personal bests: Snatch: 195 kg (1999); Clean & Jerk: 235 kg (1999); Total: 430 kg (1999)
Medal record
Men's weightlifting
Representing Ukraine
Olympic Games
Bronze medal – third place	1996 Atlanta	– 99 kg
World Championships
Gold medal – first place	1999 Athens	– 105 kg
Gold medal – first place	2002 Warsaw	– 105 kg
Bronze medal – third place	1998 Lahti	– 105 kg
European Championships
Gold medal – first place	1997 Rijeka	– 108 kg
Gold medal – first place	1999 La Coruña	– 105 kg
Silver medal – second place	1995 Warsaw	– 99 kg
Silver medal – second place	2002 Antalya	– 105 kg

Denys Rudolfovych Hotfrid (Ukrainian: Денис Рудольфович Готфрід, also transliterated Gotfrid, born 5 February 1975 in Magnitogorsk, Chelyabinsk Oblast) is a retired male weightlifter from Ukraine. He twice competed for his native country at the Summer Olympics: 1996 and 2000. Hotfrid is best known for winning a bronze medal at the 1996 Summer Olympics in the – 99 kg division, and setting a world record in clean & jerk (235 kg) on 1999-11-28 at the 1999 World Weightlifting Championships.
