= David Daly (academic) =

American academic

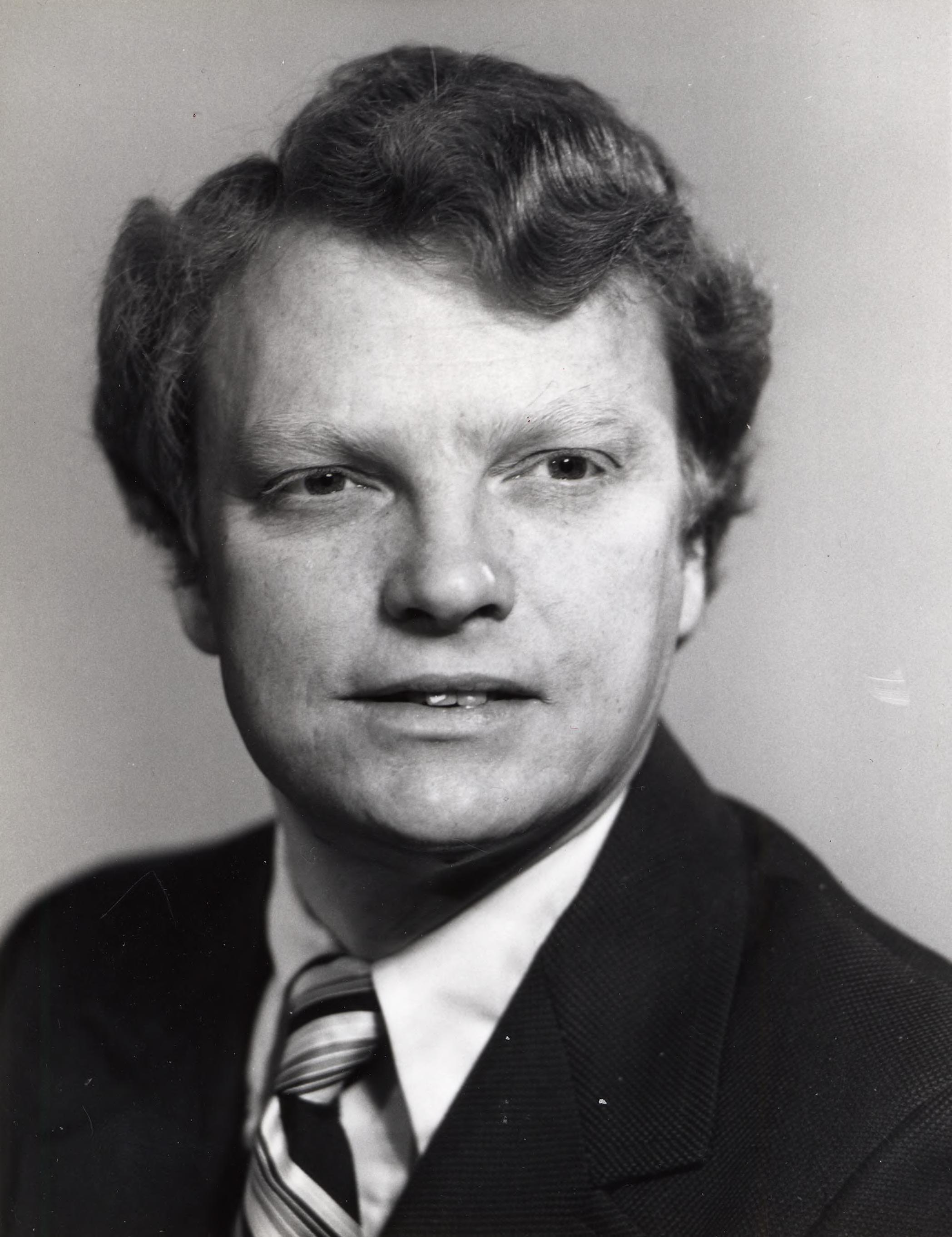
University of Michigan faculty portrait

David A. Daly (born 1940 in Michigan) is a fluency author, researcher, and center owner.

== Life and work ==
Daly was a moderately severe stutterer who went to school for speech therapy. After gaining improved fluency from a competent therapist he decided to devote his career to helping others who stuttered.

He performed considerable research in both cluttering and stuttering, and is known for his work with making cluttering diagnosis available and accessible to speech-language pathologists.

The "Predictive Cluttering Inventory" (PCI) is a worksheet that is used as a diagnosis tool for cluttering. It was first published in 1992, in his book The Source for Stuttering and Cluttering. It was revised in 1999 for an ASHA conference. The last revision, renamed the PCI, was in 2006.

Daly obtained his doctorate in Speech-Language Pathology from Pennsylvania State University and instructed at the Medical School campus of the University of Alabama at Birmingham for five years.

He was a professor at the University of Michigan from 1973 until he was given emeritus status by the University of Michigan in 1999. He was director of the speech clinic and the aphasia clinic. Daly is a fellow of the American Speech-Language-Hearing Association. In 2003, he received the Frank Kleffner Lifetime Clinical Achievement Award in 2003 for his work with stuttering clients.

Daly created a Speech & Language Center in 1979 to diagnose and treat children and adults with speech and language disorders.

== Books ==
- The Freedom of Fluency
- The Source for Stuttering and Cluttering
- Speech motor exercises: Applying motor learning principles to stuttering and apraxia
