= Weightlifting at the 1996 Summer Olympics – Men's 99 kg =

Weightlifting at the Olympics

Men's 99 kg at the Games of the XXVI Olympiad
- Venue: Georgia World Congress Center
- Date: 28 July 1996
- Competitors: 28 from 25 nations
- Winning total: 420.0 kg

Medalists
1st place, gold medalist(s)		Akakios Kakiasvili	Greece
2nd place, silver medalist(s)		Anatoly Khrapaty	Kazakhstan
3rd place, bronze medalist(s)		Denys Hotfrid	Ukraine

These are the results of the men's 99 kg competition in weightlifting at the 1996 Summer Olympics in Atlanta. A total of 28 athletes entered this event. The weightlifter from Greece won the gold, with a combined lift of 420 kg.

== Results ==
Each weightlifter had three attempts for both the snatch and clean and jerk lifting methods. The total of the best successful lift of each method was used to determine the final rankings and medal winners.

Rank	Athlete	Group	Body weight	Snatch (kg)				Clean & Jerk (kg)				Total
Rank	Athlete	Group	Body weight	1	2	3	Result	1	2	3	Result	Total
1st place, gold medalist(s)	Kakhi Kakhiashvili (GRE)	A	96.78	180.0	185.0	~~187.5~~	185.0	220.0	225.0	235.0	235.0	420.0
2nd place, silver medalist(s)	Anatoly Khrapaty (KAZ)	A	98.40	177.5	182.5	187.5	187.5	217.5	222.5	~~227.5~~	222.5	410.0
3rd place, bronze medalist(s)	Denys Gotfrid (UKR)	A	97.17	180.0	185.0	187.5	187.5	~~215.0~~	215.0	~~217.5~~	215.0	402.5
4	Stanislav Rybalchenko (UKR)	A	98.55	177.5	182.5	~~185.0~~	182.5	212.5	~~222.5~~	~~222.5~~	212.5	395.0
5	Vyacheslav Rubin (RUS)	A	98.83	175.0	~~180.0~~	~~180.0~~	175.0	215.0	~~220.0~~	~~220.0~~	215.0	390.0
6	Dmitry Smirnov (RUS)	A	98.86	170.0	~~175.0~~	175.0	175.0	210.0	215.0	~~220.0~~	215.0	390.0
7	Igor Sadykov (GER)	A	98.34	172.5	177.5	~~180.0~~	177.5	207.5	~~212.5~~	~~212.5~~	207.5	385.0
8	Aghvan Grigoryan (ARM)	A	98.33	175.0	~~180.0~~	~~180.0~~	175.0	200.0	205.0	~~210.0~~	205.0	380.0
9	Oleg Chiritsa (BLR)	A	98.63	165.0	170.0	172.5	172.5	207.5	~~215.0~~	~~215.0~~	207.5	380.0
10	Choi Dong-kil (KOR)	B	97.23	160.0	~~165.0~~	165.0	165.0	202.5	207.5	~~212.5~~	207.5	372.5
11	Tharwat Bendary (EGY)	B	97.81	160.0	165.0	167.5	167.5	205.0	~~210.0~~	~~210.0~~	205.0	372.5
12	Lorenzo Carrió (ESP)	B	98.60	160.0	165.0	167.5	167.5	200.0	~~205.0~~	~~205.0~~	200.0	367.5
13	Aleksandr Urinov (UZB)	B	97.72	165.0	170.0	172.5	172.5	192.5	~~200.0~~	~~200.0~~	192.5	365.0
14	Peter Kelley (USA)	B	98.96	160.0	~~165.0~~	~~165.0~~	160.0	192.5	197.5	~~200.0~~	197.5	357.5
15	Yoshimitsu Nishimoto (JPN)	B	98.07	155.0	~~160.0~~	~~160.0~~	155.0	~~200.0~~	200.0	~~212.5~~	200.0	355.0
16	Jaroslav Jokeľ (SVK)	B	98.35	152.5	157.5	160.0	160.0	187.5	~~192.5~~	192.5	192.5	352.5
17	Mihai Vihodet (MDA)	B	98.20	~~157.5~~	157.5	162.5	162.5	185.0	~~190.0~~	~~190.0~~	185.0	347.5
18	Deivan Valencia (COL)	B	98.31	147.5	~~152.5~~	152.5	152.5	~~190.0~~	190.0	195.0	195.0	347.5
19	Roman Polom (CZE)	B	98.53	~~155.0~~	155.0	160.0	160.0	182.5	187.5	~~190.0~~	187.5	347.5
20	Ivars Zdanovskis (LAT)	B	98.79	150.0	~~155.0~~	~~155.0~~	150.0	180.0	187.5	~~192.5~~	187.5	337.5
21	Emilson Dantas (BRA)	C	98.81	145.0	~~152.5~~	152.5	152.5	175.0	182.5	~~190.0~~	182.5	335.0
22	Cristian Escalante (CHI)	C	98.46	132.5	137.5	142.5	142.5	162.5	167.5	172.5	172.5	315.0
23	Raed Ahmed (IRQ)	C	97.80	130.0	137.5	~~140.0~~	137.5	165.0	~~180.0~~	~~180.0~~	165.0	302.5
24	Sam Nunuke Pera (COK)	C	98.11	115.0	120.0	~~125.0~~	120.0	150.0	160.0	165.0	165.0	285.0
25	Collins Okothnyawallo (KEN)	C	98.14	115.0	120.0	125.0	125.0	140.0	~~150.0~~	150.0	150.0	275.0
26	Redha Shaaban (KUW)	C	97.83	105.0	115.0	~~120.0~~	115.0	130.0	~~140.0~~	140.0	140.0	255.0
	Viacheslav Ivanovski (ISR)	B	98.50	~~175.0~~	~~175.0~~	~~175.0~~	–	–	–	–	–	–
	Sergey Kopytov (KAZ)	A	98.93	~~170.0~~	170.0	~~172.5~~	170.0	~~210.0~~	~~210.0~~	~~210.0~~	–	–
