= Ranganathan Francis =

Indian field hockey player (1920–1975)

Personal information
- Born: Ranganathan Mudhaliyar; 15 March 1920 Rangoon, Burma, British India
- Died: 1 December 1975 (aged 55) Madras (now Chennai), Tamil Nadu, India

Sport
- Sport: Field hockey
- Position: Goalkeeper
Senior career
Years	Team	Caps	Goals
–	Madras	-	-
National team
Years	Team	Caps	Goals
–	India		-
Medal record
Men's field hockey
Olympic Games
Representing India
Gold medal – first place	1948 London	Team
Gold medal – first place	1952 Helsinki	Team
Gold medal – first place	1956 Melbourne	Team

Ranganathan Francis (15 March 1920 – 1 December 1975), was an Indian field hockey player who played as a goalkeeper. He was member of the Indian team that won gold medals at three consecutive Olympic Games: 1948, 1952, and 1956.

== Biography ==
Francis was born on 15 March 1920 into a Hindu family as Manickam in Rangoon, British Burma. He moved to Tamil Nadu, India, just before the India's independence, and converted to Christianity, changing his name to Ranganathan Francis. Francis died on 1 December 1975 at the age of 55.

== Career ==
Francis pursued his career as a hockey player with Madras Police and made it to the India national team. He represented India at the Olympics in 1948, 1952 and 1956.

Francis first came to prominence after his tour of Africa in 1947 with the Indian team led by Dhyan Chand. Francis served as a substitute goalkeeper for Leo Pinto in his maiden Olympic appearance, in 1948, when India beat Great Britain 4–0 in the final to clinch gold. He was also part of the Indian team which secured gold medal in the final against the Netherlands where India registered a comfortable 6–1 win during the 1952 Summer Olympics. Francis served as a second goalkeeper besides Shankar Laxman at the 1956 Summer Olympics where India claimed gold defeating neighbours arch-rivals Pakistan 1–0 in the final. Francis was part of the Indian squad that toured Malaya and Singapore in 1954.

Francis also went on to equal the record of Richard Allen for being the only Indian goalkeepers among the seven players to have won three Olympic gold medals. He also became only the second Indian hockey goalkeeper after Allen to feature in three Olympic Games. Francis also served as a policeman in Madras Police division and retired from the police service in 1968.

== Legacy ==
He was referred to as Singam by many on the play field during his peak career. He was also nicknamed as 'Titan between the Posts' as he was regarded as a very good technician during his playing days who came way out of his gate when the Indian team attacked and acted as a defender.

Tamil Nadu also started conducting Inspector Francis Memorial Hockey Tournament among schools, a tournament named after the veteran Ranganathan Francis.

In April 2019, musical sports drama film Natpe Thunai was released which was partially based on the true life story of Ranganathan Francis. However, he was referred to as Aranganathan in the film.

In October 2020, it was revealed that Chennai Hockey Association passed a resolution to rename the Mayor Radhakrishnan Stadium which is situated in Egmore as Olympian Francis Hockey Stadium in honour of late Ranganathan Francis.
