= David Daly (weightlifter) =

Irish weightlifter

Personal information
- Full name: David Daly
- Born: 1 January 1973 (age 53)
- Weight: 101.47 kg (223.7 lb)

Sport
- Country: Ireland
- Sport: Weightlifting
- Weight class: 105 kg
- Team: National team
- Updated on 2 October 2016

David Daly (born 1 January 1973) is an Irish male weightlifter, competing in the 105 kg category and representing Ireland at international competitions. He competed at world championships, most recently at the 1999 World Weightlifting Championships.

== Major results ==
Year	Venue	Weight	Snatch (kg)				Clean & Jerk (kg)				Total	Rank
Year	Venue	Weight	1	2	3	Rank	1	2	3	Rank	Total	Rank
World Championships
1999	Piraeus, Greece	105 kg	~~122.5~~	~~122.5~~	~~122.5~~	---	155	~~162.5~~	~~162.5~~	35	0	---
1998	Lahti, Finland	94 kg	110	117.5	~~120~~	32	140	150	~~155~~	27	267.5	27
