= David Dale (disambiguation) =

David Dale (1739–1806) was a Scottish industrialist, merchant, and a founding father of socialism

David Dale may also refer to:

- Sir David Dale, 1st Baronet (1829–1906), English industrialist
- David Dale (Australian politician) (1843–1901), member of the New South Wales Legislative Assembly
- David Dale (author) (1948–2025), Australian author and journalist

== See also ==
- David Dale Gallery & Studios, art gallery in Glasgow, Scotland
