= Choi Jong-kun =

South Korean weightlifter

Personal information
- Full name: Choi Jong-kun
- Born: 14 February 1976 (age 50)
- Height: 180 cm (5 ft 11 in)
- Weight: 103.33 kg (227.8 lb)

Sport
- Country: South Korea
- Sport: Weightlifting
- Weight class: 105 kg
- Team: National team
- Updated on 3 October 2016

Choi Jong-kun (Korean: 최종근, born 14 February 1976) is a South Korean male weightlifter, competing in the 105 kg category and representing South Korea at international competitions. He participated at the 2000 Summer Olympics in the 105 kg event. He competed at world championships, most recently at the 1999 World Weightlifting Championships.

== Major results ==
(silver) - 1997 World Championships Sub-Heavyweight class (387.5 kg)
(bronze) - 1998 Asian Games Heavyweight class

Year	Venue	Weight	Snatch (kg)				Clean & Jerk (kg)				Total	Rank
Year	Venue	Weight	1	2	3	Rank	1	2	3	Rank	Total	Rank
Summer Olympics
2000	Sydney, Australia	105 kg				—N/a				—N/a		
World Championships
1999	Piraeus, Greece	105 kg	185	~~190~~	190	2nd place, silver medalist(s)	220	~~225~~	~~225~~	7	410	3rd place, bronze medalist(s)
