= Tharwat Bendary =

Egyptian weightlifter

Personal information
- Full name: Tharwat El-Bendary
- Born: 29 July 1970 (age 55)
- Weight: 103.89 kg (229.0 lb)

Sport
- Country: Egypt
- Sport: Weightlifting
- Weight class: 105 kg
- Team: National team
- Updated on 2 October 2016

Tharwat El-Bendary (Egyptian Arabic: ثروت بندارى; born 29 July 1970) is an Egyptian male weightlifter, competing in the 105 kg category and representing Egypt at international competitions. He participated at the 1996 Summer Olympics in the 99 kg event. He competed at world championships, most recently at the 1999 World Weightlifting Championships.

== Major results ==
Year	Venue	Weight	Snatch (kg)				Clean & Jerk (kg)				Total	Rank
Year	Venue	Weight	1	2	3	Rank	1	2	3	Rank	Total	Rank
Summer Olympics
1996	Atlanta, United States	99 kg				—N/a				—N/a		11
World Championships
1999	Piraeus, Greece	105 kg	~~165~~	165	~~170~~	23	200	~~210~~	~~210~~	23	365	23
