= Janne Kanerva =

Finnish weightlifter

Personal information
- Full name: Janne Nikodemus Kanerva
- Born: 29 July 1970 (age 56) Kankaanpää, Finland
- Height: 177 cm (5 ft 10 in)
- Weight: 104.40 kg (230.2 lb)

Sport
- Country: Finland
- Sport: Weightlifting
- Weight class: 105 kg
- Club: Kankaanpään Voimailijat, Kankaanpää (FIN)
- Team: National team
- Updated on 4 October 2016

Janne Nikodemus Kanerva (born 29 July 1970 in Kankaanpää) is a Finnish male weightlifter, competing in the 105 kg category and representing Finland at international competitions. He participated at the 1992 Summer Olympics in the 90 kg event and at the 1996 Summer Olympics in the 108 kg event. He competed at world championships, most recently at the 1998 World Weightlifting Championships.

== Major results ==
Year	Venue	Weight	Snatch (kg)				Clean & Jerk (kg)				Total	Rank
Year	Venue	Weight	1	2	3	Rank	1	2	3	Rank	Total	Rank
Summer Olympics
1996	Atlanta, United States	108 kg				—N/a				—N/a		14
1992	Barcelona, Spain	90 kg				—N/a				—N/a		17
World Championships
1998	Lahti, Finland	105 kg	162.5	167.5	~~172.5~~	16	200	207.5	212.5	10	380	12
