= Roman Polom (weightlifter) =

Czech weightlifter (born 1966)

Personal information
- Nationality: Czech
- Born: 17 December 1966 (age 58); Sokolov, Czechoslovakia

Sport
- Sport: Weightlifting

Roman Polom (born 17 December 1966) is a Czech weightlifter. He competed in the men's heavyweight I event at the 1996 Summer Olympics.
