= Lorenzo Carrió =

Spanish weightlifter

Personal information
- Nationality: Spanish
- Born: 7 November 1973 (age 51); Alzira, Spain

Sport
- Sport: Weightlifting

Lorenzo Carrió (born 7 November 1973) is a Spanish weightlifter. He competed in the men's heavyweight I event at the 1996 Summer Olympics.
