= Balbir Singh Sr. =

Indian field hockey player (1924–2020)

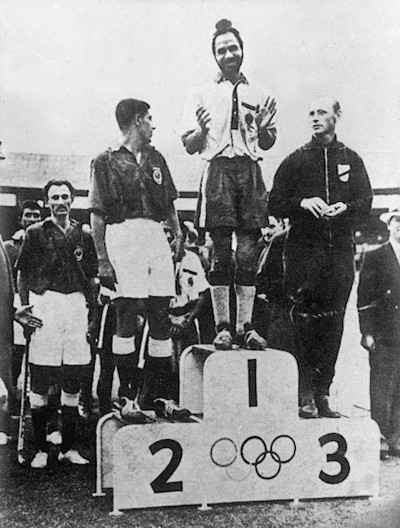
- Melbourne Olympic Victory Ceremony

Personal information
- Nationality: Indian
- Born: Balbir Singh Dosanjh; 10 October 1924 Haripur Khalsa, Punjab, British India
- Died: 25 May 2020 (aged 95) Mohali, Punjab, India
- Education: Dev Samaj High School, Moga; DM College, Moga; Sikh National College, Lahore; Khalsa College, Amritsar

Sport
- Country: India
- Sport: Field hockey
- Event: Field Hockey Men's team
- Team: India (International); Punjab State (National); Punjab Police (National); Punjab University (National)
Medal record
Men's field hockey
Representing India
Summer Olympics
Gold medal – first place	1948 London	Team
Gold medal – first place	1952 Helsinki	Team
Gold medal – first place	1956 Melbourne	Team
Asian Games
Silver medal – second place	1958 Tokyo	Team

Balbir Singh Dosanjh (10 October 1924 – 25 May 2020) predominantly known as Balbir Singh Sr., was an Indian hockey player and coach. He was a three-time Olympic gold medalist, having played a key role in India's wins in London (1948), Helsinki (1952) (as vice captain), and Melbourne (1956) (as captain) Olympics. He is regarded as one of the greatest hockey players of all time, a modern-day Dhyan Chand, a legend of the sport, and is widely regarded as the sport's greatest ever centre-forward. His Olympic record for most goals scored by an individual in an Olympic men's hockey final remains unbeaten. Singh set this record when he scored five goals in India's 6–1 victory over the Netherlands in the men's field hockey final of the 1952 Olympic Games. He was often called Balbir Singh Senior to distinguish him from other Indian hockey players named Balbir Singh. Singh scored 246 goals from just 61 international caps and scored 23 goals in just 8 Olympic matches

Singh was the manager and chief coach of the Indian team for the 1975 Men's Hockey World Cup, which India won, and the 1971 Men's Hockey World Cup, where India earned a bronze medal. During the London Olympics in 2012, Singh was honoured in the Olympic Museum exhibition, "The Olympic Journey: The Story of the Games,” held at the Royal Opera House. The exhibition told the story of the Olympic Games from its creation in 776BC through to the London 2012 Olympic Games. He was one of the 16 iconic Olympians recognized as an example "of human strength and endeavour, of passion, determination, hard work and achievement and demonstrates the values of the Olympic Movement".

Singh died in Mohali Fortes Hospital on 25 May 2020 while in ICU due to suspected case of Pneumonia after he experienced high fever.

== Early years ==
Balbir Singh Dosanjh was born in a Jat Sikh family to Karam Kaur and Dalip Singh Dosanjh. His father was a freedom fighter who was absent most of Singh’s early years due to being frequently jailed. At the age of 12, Singh saw a newsreel on India's 1936 Olympic hockey triumph, which sparked his interest in hockey. He was later spotted as a promising hockey player by the coach of Khalsa College hockey team. While at Khalsa, Singh led the team to three consecutive championships as captain and was soon playing for the Punjab state team. He helped the Punjab state team win two consecutive national titles in 1946 and 1947.

== 1948–1956 ==
=== London Olympics (1948) ===
Singh's first appearance at the 1948 London Olympics was in the match against Argentina, India's second match. After that he played in Final against Great Britain. Singh scored the first two goals and India won by 4–0.

=== Helsinki Olympics (1952) ===
Singh was vice-captain of 1952 Olympic team, with K. D. Singh as the Captain. Balbir was India's flag bearer in the opening ceremony. He scored a hat trick against Britain in semi-final, which India won 3–1. He scored five goals in India's 6–1 win against the Netherlands setting a new Olympic record for most goals scored by an individual in an Olympic final in men's field hockey. The previous holder of this record was England's Reggie Pridmore with his four goals in England's 8–1 victory over Ireland in the 1908 Olympic final. Singh scored nine of the India's total 13 goals at the Helsinki Olympics, 69.23% of the team's goals.

In 1954, he captained the Indian Hockey Federation XI side that toured Malaya and Singapore. India won all 16 matches played, with Singh top-scoring for his team with 44 goals in the tour.

=== Melbourne Olympics (1956) ===
Singh, captain of the 1956 Olympic team, scored five goals in the opening match against Afghanistan, but was then injured. Randhir Singh Gentle captained the rest of the group matches. Singh had to skip the group matches, but played in the semi-final and the final. India won the final match against Pakistan with a result of 1–0. In total of 8 Olympic matches he played he scored 23 goals for his nation

== Post-1956 ==
In 1957, Singh became the first recipient of the Padma Shri award in the sports category. He was also a member of the Indian hockey team that won the silver medal at the 1958 Asian Games. He coached the 1971 Indian hockey team for the Hockey World Cup, where India earned the bronze medal. In 1975, he was the manager of the victorious Indian World Cup hockey team. He wrote two books: his autobiography The Golden Hat Trick (1977) and The Golden Yardstick: In Quest of Hockey Excellence (2008).

== Awards and achievements ==
In 1957, Singh was the first sports personality to be honoured with the Padma Shri award. He and Gurdev Singh were featured on a stamp issued in 1958 by Dominican Republic to commemorate the 1956 Melbourne Olympics.

He lit the Sacred Flame at the Asian Games 1982 held at New Delhi. That same year, he was adjudged to be the Indian Sportsperson of the Century in a national poll conducted by the Patriot newspaper.

In 2006, he was named the Best Sikh Hockey Player. Describing himself as a secular nationalist, he stated that he was not convinced about the idea of having a religion-based list of players, but accepted the award since he believed it might be good for the promotion of Indian hockey. In 2015, he was conferred with the Major Dhyan Chand Lifetime Achievement Award of Hockey India.

On 25 May 2021, the Mohali International Hockey Stadium was renamed the Olympian Balbir Singh Senior International Hockey Stadium in honor of his death anniversary.

== Erroneous reports ==
Although the record for most goals by an individual in an Olympic final belongs to Singh there have been many erroneous media reports over the years claiming that Dhyan Chand scored six goals in India's 8–1 victory over Germany in the 1936 Olympic final. In his autobiography titled "Goal!", however, published in 1952 by Sport & Pastime, Chennai, Chand wrote:

"When Germany was four goals down, a ball hit Allen's pad and rebounded. The Germans took full advantage of this and made a rush, netting the ball before we could stop it. That was the only goal Germany would score in the match against our eight, and incidentally the only goal scored against India in the entire Olympic tournament. India's goal-getters were Roop Singh, Tapsell and Jaffar with one each, Dara two and myself three."

Additionally, the International Hockey Federation records also attribute only three of the eight goals to Chand in the Berlin Olympic final.

== Film and literature ==
The character of Himmat Singh in Gold (movie) was loosely inspired by Balbir Singh Dosanjh and various scenes shown were inspired from true incidents as Balbir was indeed handcuffed by British official as they wanted him to play forcibly for Punjab Police team.

== See also ==
- List of Indian hockey captains in Olympics
- Field hockey in India
- India men's national field hockey team

Olympic Games
Preceded by Talimeran Ao	Flagbearer for India; Helsinki 1952	Succeeded by Balbir Singh Sr.
Preceded by Balbir Singh Sr.	Flagbearer for India; Melbourne 1956	Succeeded by Gurbachan Singh Randhawa
