= Dimitri Prochorow =

German weightlifter

Personal information
- Nationality: German
- Born: 16 September 1968 (age 56); Saint Petersburg, Russia

Sport
- Sport: Weightlifting

Dimitri Prochorow (born 16 September 1968) is a German weightlifter. He competed in the men's heavyweight II event at the 1996 Summer Olympics.
