= Hisaya Yoshimoto =

Japanese weightlifter (born 1973)

Personal information
- Nationality: Japanese
- Born: 29 May 1973 (age 52)

Sport
- Sport: Weightlifting

Hisaya Yoshimoto (吉本 久也, Yoshimoto Hisaya; born 29 May 1973) is a Japanese weightlifter. He competed at the 1996 Summer Olympics and the 2000 Summer Olympics.
