= 2007 World Weightlifting Championships – Men's 77 kg =

The men's competition in 77 kg division was staged on September 20–21, 2007.

== Schedule ==
Date	Time	Event
20 September 2007	09:30	Group D
20 September 2007	12:00	Group C
20 September 2007	20:00	Group B
21 September 2007	17:00	Group A

== Medalists ==
Event	Gold		Silver		Bronze	
Snatch	Li Hongli (CHN)	166 kg	Gevorg Davtyan (ARM)	164 kg	Oleg Perepetchenov (RUS)	163 kg
Clean & Jerk	Ivan Stoitsov (BUL)	205 kg	Kim Kwang-hoon (KOR)	201 kg	Sa Jae-hyouk (KOR)	200 kg
Total	Ivan Stoitsov (BUL)	363 kg	Gevorg Davtyan (ARM)	362 kg	Li Hongli (CHN)	361 kg

== Records ==
Prior to this competition, the existing world records were as follows.

World record	Snatch	Sergey Filimonov (KAZ)	173 kg	Almaty, Kazakhstan	9 April 2004
World record	Clean & jerk	Oleg Perepetchenov (RUS)	210 kg	Trenčín, Slovakia	27 April 2001
World record	Total	Plamen Zhelyazkov (BUL)	377 kg	Doha, Qatar	27 March 2002

== Results ==
Rank	Athlete	Group	Body weight	Snatch (kg)				Clean & Jerk (kg)				Total
Rank	Athlete	Group	Body weight	1	2	3	Rank	1	2	3	Rank	Total
1st place, gold medalist(s)	Ivan Stoitsov (BUL)	A	76.83	~~158~~	158	~~160~~	6	193	200	205	1st place, gold medalist(s)	363
2nd place, silver medalist(s)	Gevorg Davtyan (ARM)	A	76.83	164	~~167~~	~~167~~	2nd place, silver medalist(s)	~~193~~	193	198	4	362
3rd place, bronze medalist(s)	Li Hongli (CHN)	A	76.55	163	166	~~168~~	1st place, gold medalist(s)	~~195~~	~~195~~	195	5	361
4	Kim Kwang-hoon (KOR)	A	76.61	150	~~155~~	155	10	190	197	201	2nd place, silver medalist(s)	356
5	Sa Jae-hyouk (KOR)	A	76.04	153	~~158~~	—	13	187	197	200	3rd place, bronze medalist(s)	353
6	Oleg Perepetchenov (RUS)	A	76.58	155	160	163	3rd place, bronze medalist(s)	190	~~196~~	~~196~~	8	353
7	Krzysztof Szramiak (POL)	A	76.84	~~157~~	~~157~~	157	8	188	191	~~195~~	6	348
8	Mikalai Charniak (BLR)	A	76.82	155	160	162	4	185	~~190~~	~~190~~	17	347
9	Vladimir Kuznetsov (KAZ)	B	76.59	150	155	~~160~~	9	180	185	190	10	345
10	Siarhei Lahun (BLR)	A	76.45	~~152~~	152	~~157~~	16	185	190	~~194~~	7	342
11	Octavio Mejías (VEN)	C	76.78	~~147~~	147	152	17	185	190	~~193~~	12	342
12	Iván Cambar (CUB)	B	76.88	~~152~~	152	~~156~~	19	187	~~194~~	—	14	339
13	Sergey Filimonov (KAZ)	B	76.54	~~150~~	150	157	7	175	180	~~183~~	25	337
14	José Ocando (VEN)	B	76.76	140	~~145~~	145	29	185	190	~~195~~	11	335
15	Sebastian Dogariu (ROU)	B	76.78	150	154	~~157~~	12	181	—	—	22	335
16	René Hoch (GER)	B	76.46	~~148~~	148	151	20	182	~~188~~	~~188~~	20	333
17	Sandow Nasution (INA)	B	76.02	141	~~146~~	146	26	185	~~192~~	~~192~~	15	331
18	Kraisorn Dadtuyawat (THA)	C	76.32	140	~~145~~	145	27	180	185	~~187~~	16	330
19	Ibrahim Ramadan (EGY)	B	75.85	145	~~148~~	148	24	175	180	~~182~~	24	328
20	Namig Jamilov (AZE)	B	76.46	145	~~150~~	~~150~~	28	180	183	~~184~~	18	328
21	Mohammad Ali Falahatinejad (IRI)	B	76.69	140	~~145~~	~~145~~	35	181	~~188~~	188	13	328
22	Sohrab Moradi (IRI)	B	76.74	~~145~~	145	153	14	~~175~~	~~175~~	175	29	328
23	Felix Ekpo (NGR)	C	76.36	141	146	150	22	172	~~177~~	177	26	327
24	Chad Vaughn (USA)	C	76.50	143	~~147~~	~~147~~	32	~~183~~	183	~~185~~	19	326
25	László Bíró (ROU)	B	76.85	145	~~149~~	~~150~~	30	~~180~~	181	~~185~~	23	326
26	Giovanni Bardis (FRA)	C	76.80	146	150	152	18	173	~~177~~	~~177~~	31	325
27	Viktor Gumán (SVK)	C	76.24	150	~~154~~	154	11	170	~~174~~	~~174~~	33	324
28	Sherzodjon Yusupov (UZB)	C	75.67	134	~~138~~	138	37	~~174~~	174	181	21	319
29	Ali El-Moujoud (FRA)	C	76.32	141	143	~~145~~	31	172	~~176~~	176	27	319
30	Sergio Martínez (ESP)	C	75.14	140	147	~~151~~	25	170	~~175~~	~~175~~	32	317
31	Reyhan Arabacıoğlu (TUR)	C	76.37	140	~~145~~	~~145~~	33	170	175	~~178~~	28	315
32	Matt Bruce (USA)	C	76.78	140	~~145~~	~~145~~	36	175	~~180~~	~~180~~	30	315
33	János Baranyai (HUN)	C	76.50	135	140	~~143~~	34	165	170	~~175~~	34	310
34	Zulkifli Che Rose (MAS)	D	76.80	~~132~~	~~132~~	132	39	~~163~~	163	166	37	298
35	Inoýat Jumaýew (TKM)	D	76.48	130	~~135~~	~~135~~	41	160	167	~~171~~	35	297
36	Asif Mammadov (AZE)	D	69.03	~~134~~	134	~~137~~	38	161	~~165~~	~~165~~	38	295
37	Kambar Toktonaliev (KGZ)	D	76.36	130	~~135~~	~~135~~	40	160	~~165~~	~~165~~	39	290
38	Ben Turner (AUS)	D	76.87	~~120~~	120	~~125~~	44	160	167	~~172~~	36	287
39	Saun Trebillcock (GBR)	D	76.95	~~125~~	125	~~128~~	42	155	~~161~~	~~161~~	40	280
40	Ramón Moncada (HON)	D	75.60	120	~~125~~	~~125~~	43	145	150	~~155~~	41	270
41	Romain Marchessou (MON)	D	72.90	105	~~110~~	~~110~~	45	125	~~130~~	~~135~~	42	230
—	Spyridon Stamatiadis (GRE)	B	76.74	155	160	~~166~~	5	—	—	—	—	—
—	Yukio Peter (NRU)	A	76.76	~~145~~	145	153	15	~~187~~	~~187~~	~~187~~	—	—
—	Nader Sufyan Abbas (QAT)	A	76.18	~~150~~	150	~~155~~	21	—	—	—	—	—
—	Edinson Angulo (COL)	B	76.48	143	147	150	23	~~183~~	~~183~~	~~183~~	—	—
—	Mahmoud El-Haddad (EGY)	B	76.58	~~145~~	~~145~~	~~145~~	—	190	~~196~~	~~196~~	9	—
—	Dương Thanh Trúc (VIE)	D	75.66	~~125~~	~~125~~	~~125~~	—	—	—	—	—	—
—	Rudolf Lukáč (SVK)	D	76.95	~~135~~	~~137~~	~~137~~	—	—	—	—	—	—
