= 2005 World Weightlifting Championships – Men's 77 kg =

The 2005 World Weightlifting Championships were held in Doha, Qatar from 9 November to 17 November. The men's 77 kilograms division was staged on 12 November 2005.

== Schedule ==
Date	Time	Event
12 November 2005	15:00	Group B
12 November 2005	20:00	Group A

== Medalists ==
Event	Gold		Silver		Bronze	
Snatch	Li Hongli (CHN)	165 kg	Sebastian Dogariu (ROM)	163 kg	Nader Sufyan Abbas (QAT)	160 kg
Clean & Jerk	Li Hongli (CHN)	196 kg	Yukio Peter (NRU)	193 kg	René Hoch (GER)	192 kg
Total	Li Hongli (CHN)	361 kg	Sebastian Dogariu (ROM)	353 kg	Nader Sufyan Abbas (QAT)	351 kg

== Records ==
Prior to this competition, the existing world records were as follows.

World Record	Snatch	Sergey Filimonov (KAZ)	173 kg	Almaty, Kazakhstan	9 April 2004
World Record	Clean & Jerk	Oleg Perepetchenov (RUS)	210 kg	Trenčín, Slovakia	27 April 2001
World Record	Total	Plamen Zhelyazkov (BUL)	377 kg	Doha, Qatar	27 March 2002

== Results ==
Rank	Athlete	Group	Body weight	Snatch (kg)				Clean & Jerk (kg)				Total
Rank	Athlete	Group	Body weight	1	2	3	Rank	1	2	3	Rank	Total
1st place, gold medalist(s)	Li Hongli (CHN)	A	76.81	160	165	~~170~~	1st place, gold medalist(s)	190	~~195~~	196	1st place, gold medalist(s)	361
2nd place, silver medalist(s)	Sebastian Dogariu (ROM)	A	76.51	155	160	163	2nd place, silver medalist(s)	185	~~190~~	190	5	353
3rd place, bronze medalist(s)	Nader Sufyan Abbas (QAT)	A	76.55	155	~~160~~	160	3rd place, bronze medalist(s)	191	~~196~~	~~201~~	4	351
4	Yukio Peter (NRU)	A	76.70	143	150	155	7	185	~~192~~	193	2nd place, silver medalist(s)	348
5	René Hoch (GER)	A	76.64	~~148~~	150	153	8	182	187	192	3rd place, bronze medalist(s)	345
6	Georgi Markov (BUL)	A	76.94	155	160	~~163~~	4	~~185~~	185	~~189~~	6	345
7	Sergio Martínez (ESP)	A	76.09	145	~~150~~	152	10	170	175	178	9	330
8	Viktor Gumán (SVK)	A	76.92	153	~~158~~	~~158~~	9	170	174	177	10	330
9	Santo Rivera (DOM)	A	75.07	136	141	145	11	173	178	181	7	326
10	Lance Frye (USA)	B	76.77	~~140~~	140	145	12	~~170~~	170	175	12	320
11	Turan Mirzayev (AZE)	B	76.60	140	144	~~148~~	14	~~175~~	175	~~178~~	11	319
12	José Ocando (VEN)	B	76.50	132	~~138~~	138	18	170	180	~~182~~	8	318
13	Matt Bruce (USA)	B	76.46	133	138	140	17	170	~~176~~	~~180~~	15	310
14	Andrei Guțu (MDA)	B	76.50	142	~~147~~	~~147~~	15	160	165	168	17	310
15	Maksudjan Rejepow (TKM)	B	76.87	~~145~~	145	~~150~~	13	~~165~~	165	—	19	310
16	Vladimiros Lazaridis (GRE)	B	73.90	135	~~140~~	~~140~~	20	167	173	~~177~~	13	308
17	Edinson Angulo (COL)	B	75.54	~~136~~	~~136~~	136	19	172	~~178~~	~~178~~	14	308
18	Ghenadie Grosu (MDA)	B	75.85	~~138~~	~~140~~	140	16	167	~~171~~	~~171~~	18	307
19	Darryn Anthony (RSA)	B	76.54	135	~~140~~	~~140~~	21	160	170	—	16	305
20	Miroslav Janíček (SVK)	B	75.01	126	129	~~132~~	22	164	~~168~~	~~168~~	20	293
21	Jack Odongo (KEN)	B	76.13	105	110	~~115~~	24	~~145~~	145	~~150~~	21	255
—	Krzysztof Szramiak (POL)	A	76.15	155	158	~~161~~	5	~~190~~	~~190~~	~~193~~	—	—
—	Richie Patterson (NZL)	B	76.53	~~125~~	125	~~130~~	23	~~155~~	~~155~~	~~155~~	—	—
—	Hovannes Amreyan (ARM)	A	76.81	~~155~~	~~155~~	~~156~~	—	~~185~~	—	—	—	—
—	Harem Taha (IRQ)	A	77.00	151	156	~~161~~	6	~~191~~	~~191~~	~~191~~	—	—
