= Weightlifting at the 2006 Asian Games – Men's 77 kg =

Men's 77 kg at the 2006 Asian Games
- Venue: Al-Dana Banquet Hall
- Date: 4 December 2006
- Competitors: 18 from 17 nations

Medalists
gold medal	Li Hongli	China
silver medal	Lee Jeong-jae	South Korea
bronze medal	Harem Taha	Iraq

The men's 77 kilograms event at the 2006 Asian Games took place on December 4, 2006 at Al-Dana Banquet Hall in Doha.

== Schedule ==
All times are Arabia Standard Time (UTC+03:00)

Date	Time	Event
Monday, 4 December 2006	10:00	Group B
Monday, 4 December 2006	19:00	Group A

== Records ==
Prior to this competition, the existing world, Asian and Games records were as follows.

World Record	Snatch	Sergey Filimonov (KAZ)	173 kg	Almaty, Kazakhstan	9 April 2004
World Record	Clean & Jerk	Oleg Perepetchenov (RUS)	210 kg	Trenčín, Slovakia	27 April 2001
World Record	Total	Plamen Zhelyazkov (BUL)	377 kg	Doha, Qatar	27 March 2002
Asian Record	Snatch	Sergey Filimonov (KAZ)	173 kg	Almaty, Kazakhstan	9 April 2004
Asian Record	Clean & Jerk	Mohammad Ali Falahatinejad (IRI)	208 kg	Qinhuangdao, China	12 September 2003
Asian Record	Total	Sergey Filimonov (KAZ)	375 kg	Busan, South Korea	4 October 2002
Games Record	Snatch	Sergey Filimonov (KAZ)	173 kg	Busan, South Korea	4 October 2002
Games Record	Clean & Jerk	Mohammad Hossein Barkhah (IRI)	202 kg	Busan, South Korea	4 October 2002
Games Record	Total	Sergey Filimonov (KAZ)	375 kg	Busan, South Korea	4 October 2002

== Results ==
Legend

- NM — No mark

Rank	Athlete	Group	Body weight	Snatch (kg)				Clean & Jerk (kg)				Total
Rank	Athlete	Group	Body weight	1	2	3	Result	1	2	3	Result	Total
1st place, gold medalist(s)	Li Hongli (CHN)	A	76.52	160	165	~~168~~	165	188	193	196	196	361
2nd place, silver medalist(s)	Lee Jeong-jae (KOR)	A	76.87	~~150~~	~~150~~	150	150	187	191	~~200~~	191	341
3rd place, bronze medalist(s)	Harem Taha (IRQ)	A	76.98	151	~~155~~	155	155	186	~~193~~	~~193~~	186	341
4	Nader Sufyan Abbas (QAT)	A	76.66	150	~~155~~	155	155	185	~~190~~	~~192~~	185	340
5	Kraisorn Dadtuyawat (THA)	A	75.12	137	142	~~145~~	142	177	185	188	188	330
6	Yoshito Shintani (JPN)	A	75.20	135	140	143	143	180	185	~~188~~	185	328
7	Zhenis Aldabergenov (KAZ)	A	76.21	137	142	~~145~~	142	175	~~180~~	~~180~~	175	317
8	Sherzodjon Yusupov (UZB)	A	76.51	135	140	~~143~~	140	175	~~180~~	~~180~~	175	315
9	Zamirbek Ashyrbaev (KGZ)	A	76.65	130	137	~~142~~	137	~~165~~	165	172	172	309
10	Maksudjan Rejepow (TKM)	A	76.12	135	~~140~~	~~140~~	135	155	160	~~167~~	160	295
11	Awais Akbar (PAK)	B	75.85	125	~~128~~	128	128	145	155	160	160	288
12	Ahmad Al-Aboudi (JOR)	A	75.11	125	~~128~~	~~130~~	125	~~157~~	~~162~~	162	162	287
13	Jasim Al-Nahham (BRN)	B	76.44	~~115~~	115	121	121	132	139	142	142	263
14	Fahad Awlad Thani (OMA)	B	75.74	~~108~~	110	~~115~~	110	135	141	146	146	256
15	Ahmad Tarha (LIB)	B	76.97	118	~~123~~	~~123~~	118	130	~~140~~	~~140~~	130	248
16	Musa Saleh (QAT)	B	75.64	90	95	100	100	110	115	120	120	220
—	Faisal Al-Salami (KSA)	B	76.55	~~125~~	~~125~~	~~125~~	—	—	—	—	—	NM
—	Husain Al-Hamad (KUW)	B	76.65	~~130~~	~~130~~	~~130~~	—	—	—	—	—	NM
