= 2004 Summer Olympics medal table =

2004 Summer Olympics medals
- Location: Athens, Greece

Highlights
- Most gold medals: United States (36)
- Most total medals: United States (101)
- Medalling NOCs: 74

World map showing the medal achievements of each country during the 2004 Summer Olympics Legend: represents countries that won at least one gold medal. represents countries that won at least one silver medal but no gold medals. represents countries that won at least one bronze medal (no gold or silver). represents participating countries that did not win medals. represents entities that did not participate at the 2004 Summer Olympics.

The Olympic flame burns in the Athens Olympic Stadium cauldron, during the opening ceremonies of the 2004 Summer Olympics.

The 2004 Summer Olympics, officially known as the Games of the XXVIII Olympiad, were a summer multi-sport event held in Athens, the capital city of Greece, from 13 to 29 August 2004. A total of 10,625 athletes from a record 201 countries represented by National Olympic Committees (NOC) participated in these games. The games featured 301 events in 28 sports and 39 disciplines, including the Olympic debuts of women's wrestling and women's sabre. Kiribati and Timor Leste competed for the first time in these Olympic Games. It was the second time after 1896 that Athens had hosted the Summer Olympics in the modern era.

Athletes from 74 countries won at least one medal and 56 of them won at least one gold medal. The United States led the medal table both in number of gold medals won and in overall medals, winning 36 and 101 respectively. It was the third consecutive Summer Olympic Games that the United States led the medal count in both gold and overall medals. The United Arab Emirates, Paraguay and Eritrea won their first ever Olympic medals. Israel, Chile, Dominican Republic, Georgia, Chinese Taipei and the United Arab Emirates won their first Olympic gold medals. American swimmer Michael Phelps won the most gold medals among individual participants with six and the most total medals with eight (six gold and two bronze), equalling the record held by Soviet gymnast Alexander Dityatin in 1980 for the most medals won at an Olympic Games.

During and after the Games, some athletes who were caught doping, or tested positive for banned substances, were disqualified from competition and had their medals rescinded.

== Medal table ==
The medal table is based on information provided by the International Olympic Committee (IOC) and is consistent with IOC convention in its published medal tables. The table uses the Olympic medal table sorting method. By default, the table is ordered by the number of gold medals the athletes from a nation have won, where a nation is an entity represented by a NOC. The number of silver medals is taken into consideration next and then the number of bronze medals. If teams are still tied, equal ranking is given and they are listed alphabetically by their IOC country code.

Events in boxing result in a bronze medal being awarded to each of the two competitors who lose their semi-final matches, as opposed to fighting in a third place tie breaker. Another combat sport, judo, uses a repechage system which also results in two bronze medals being awarded. In the women's 200 metre backstroke, there were ties for third place which resulted in two bronze medals being awarded.

Key

‡ Changes in medal standings (see below)

* Host nation (Greece)

2004 Summer Olympics medal table (Note: Figures in table reflect all official changes in medal standings.)
Rank	NOC	Gold	Silver	Bronze	Total
1	United States‡	36	39	26	101
2	China	32	17	14	63
3	Russia‡	28	26	36	90
4	Australia‡	17	16	17	50
5	Japan‡	16	9	12	37
6	Germany‡	13	16	20	49
7	France	11	9	13	33
8	Italy	10	11	11	32
9	South Korea	9	12	9	30
10	Great Britain	9	9	12	30
11	Cuba‡	9	7	11	27
12	Hungary‡	8	6	3	17
13	Ukraine‡	8	5	9	22
14	Romania	8	5	6	19
15	Greece*‡	6	6	4	16
16	Brazil‡	5	2	3	10
17	Norway	5	0	1	6
18	Netherlands	4	9	9	22
19	Sweden	4	2	1	7
20	Spain‡	3	11	6	20
21	Canada	3	6	3	12
22	Turkey‡	3	3	4	10
23	Poland	3	2	5	10
24	New Zealand	3	2	0	5
25	Thailand	3	1	4	8
26	Belarus‡	2	5	6	13
27	Austria	2	4	1	7
28	Ethiopia	2	3	2	7
29	Iran	2	2	2	6
29	Slovakia	2	2	2	6
31	Chinese Taipei	2	2	1	5
32	Georgia	2	2	0	4
33	Bulgaria	2	1	9	12
34	Denmark‡	2	1	5	8
35	Jamaica	2	1	2	5
35	Uzbekistan	2	1	2	5
37	Morocco	2	1	0	3
38	Argentina	2	0	4	6
39	Chile	2	0	1	3
40	Kazakhstan	1	4	3	8
41	Kenya	1	4	2	7
42	Czech Republic‡	1	3	5	9
43	South Africa	1	3	2	6
44	Croatia	1	2	2	5
45	Lithuania‡	1	2	0	3
46	Egypt	1	1	3	5
46	Switzerland	1	1	3	5
48	Indonesia	1	1	2	4
49	Zimbabwe	1	1	1	3
50	Azerbaijan	1	0	4	5
51	Belgium	1	0	2	3
52	Bahamas	1	0	1	2
52	Israel	1	0	1	2
54	Cameroon	1	0	0	1
54	Dominican Republic	1	0	0	1
54	United Arab Emirates	1	0	0	1
57	North Korea	0	4	1	5
58	Latvia	0	4	0	4
59	Mexico	0	3	1	4
60	Portugal	0	2	1	3
61	Finland	0	2	0	2
61	Serbia and Montenegro	0	2	0	2
63	Slovenia	0	1	3	4
64	Estonia‡	0	1	2	3
65	Hong Kong	0	1	0	1
65	India	0	1	0	1
65	Paraguay	0	1	0	1
68	Colombia	0	0	2	2
68	Nigeria	0	0	2	2
68	Venezuela‡	0	0	2	2
71	Eritrea	0	0	1	1
71	Mongolia	0	0	1	1
71	Syria	0	0	1	1
71	Trinidad and Tobago	0	0	1	1
Totals (74 entries)		301	300	325	926

== Changes in medal standings ==
List of official changes in medal standings
Ruling date	Event	Athlete (NOC)	1st place, gold medalist(s)	2nd place, silver medalist(s)	3rd place, bronze medalist(s)	Net change	Comment
Changes during the Games
20 August 2004	Weightlifting, Men's 62 kg	Leonidas Sabanis (GRE) DSQ			−1	−1	Greece's Leonidas Sabanis was stripped of his bronze medal in the men's 62 kg weightlifting competition and expelled from the Games by the International Olympic Committee (IOC) after he tested positive for excess testosterone. The bronze medal was reallocated to Venezuela's Israel José Rubio.
20 August 2004	Weightlifting, Men's 62 kg	Israel José Rubio (VEN)			+1	+1	Greece's Leonidas Sabanis was stripped of his bronze medal in the men's 62 kg weightlifting competition and expelled from the Games by the International Olympic Committee (IOC) after he tested positive for excess testosterone. The bronze medal was reallocated to Venezuela's Israel José Rubio.
23 August 2004	Athletics, Women's shot put	Irina Korzhanenko (RUS) DSQ	−1			−1	Russian athlete Irina Korzhanenko lost her gold medal in women's shot put due to her testing positive for the steroid stanozolol. Cuban Yumileidi Cumbá Jay was upgraded to the gold medal, with German competitor Nadine Kleinert receiving the silver medal, and Svetlana Krivelyova of Russia receiving the bronze medal. However, on 5 December 2012, Krivelyova had the bronze medal she had been given rescinded because she had tested positive for the anabolic androgenic steroid oxandrolone metabolite. As of 2024, the IOC has not reallocated the bronze medal.
23 August 2004	Athletics, Women's shot put	Yumileidi Cumbá Jay (CUB)	+1	−1		0	
23 August 2004	Athletics, Women's shot put	Nadine Kleinert (GER)		+1	−1	0	
24 August 2004	Athletics. Men's discus throw	Róbert Fazekas (HUN) DSQ	−1			−1	Hungarian discus thrower Róbert Fazekas was disqualified by the IOC's executive board from the gold medal of the men's discus throw event on 24 August 2004 after he failed to provide a full urine sample. Virgilijus Alekna of Lithuania was elevated to the gold medal, the silver medal was given to Zoltán Kővágó of Hungary and the bronze medal went to Aleksander Tammert of Estonia.
24 August 2004	Athletics. Men's discus throw	Virgilijus Alekna (LTU)	+1	−1		0	Hungarian discus thrower Róbert Fazekas was disqualified by the IOC's executive board from the gold medal of the men's discus throw event on 24 August 2004 after he failed to provide a full urine sample. Virgilijus Alekna of Lithuania was elevated to the gold medal, the silver medal was given to Zoltán Kővágó of Hungary and the bronze medal went to Aleksander Tammert of Estonia.
24 August 2004	Athletics. Men's discus throw	Zoltán Kővágó (HUN)		+1	−1	0	Hungarian discus thrower Róbert Fazekas was disqualified by the IOC's executive board from the gold medal of the men's discus throw event on 24 August 2004 after he failed to provide a full urine sample. Virgilijus Alekna of Lithuania was elevated to the gold medal, the silver medal was given to Zoltán Kővágó of Hungary and the bronze medal went to Aleksander Tammert of Estonia.
24 August 2004	Athletics. Men's discus throw	Aleksander Tammert (EST)			+1	+1	Hungarian discus thrower Róbert Fazekas was disqualified by the IOC's executive board from the gold medal of the men's discus throw event on 24 August 2004 after he failed to provide a full urine sample. Virgilijus Alekna of Lithuania was elevated to the gold medal, the silver medal was given to Zoltán Kővágó of Hungary and the bronze medal went to Aleksander Tammert of Estonia.
28 August 2004	Weightlifting, Men's 105 kg	Ferenc Gyurkovics (HUN) DSQ		−1		−1	On 28 August 2004, Hungary's Ferenc Gyurkovics was disqualified from the Olympic Games and stripped of the silver medal he had won in the men's 105 kg weightlighting competition because he had tested positive for the banned steroid oxandrolone. Both Ukraine's Ihor Razoronov and Russia's Gleb Pisarevskiy were elevated the silver and bronze medal positions, respectively.
28 August 2004	Weightlifting, Men's 105 kg	Ihor Razoronov (UKR)		+1	−1	0	On 28 August 2004, Hungary's Ferenc Gyurkovics was disqualified from the Olympic Games and stripped of the silver medal he had won in the men's 105 kg weightlighting competition because he had tested positive for the banned steroid oxandrolone. Both Ukraine's Ihor Razoronov and Russia's Gleb Pisarevskiy were elevated the silver and bronze medal positions, respectively.
28 August 2004	Weightlifting, Men's 105 kg	Gleb Pisarevskiy (RUS)			+1	0	On 28 August 2004, Hungary's Ferenc Gyurkovics was disqualified from the Olympic Games and stripped of the silver medal he had won in the men's 105 kg weightlighting competition because he had tested positive for the banned steroid oxandrolone. Both Ukraine's Ihor Razoronov and Russia's Gleb Pisarevskiy were elevated the silver and bronze medal positions, respectively.
29 August 2004	Athletics, Men's hammer throw	Adrián Annus (HUN) DSQ	−1			−1	On 29 August 2004, the IOC disqualified Hungarian hammer thrower Adrián Annus for not attending a second drugs test in Hungary after suspicions were raised that he possibly used a contraption to deceive testers. Koji Murofushi of Japan became the new gold medallist, while Belarus's Ivan Tsikhan received the silver medal and Turkey's Eşref Apak was upgraded to the bronze medal placing.
29 August 2004	Athletics, Men's hammer throw	Koji Murofushi (JPN)	+1	−1		0	On 29 August 2004, the IOC disqualified Hungarian hammer thrower Adrián Annus for not attending a second drugs test in Hungary after suspicions were raised that he possibly used a contraption to deceive testers. Koji Murofushi of Japan became the new gold medallist, while Belarus's Ivan Tsikhan received the silver medal and Turkey's Eşref Apak was upgraded to the bronze medal placing.
29 August 2004	Athletics, Men's hammer throw	Ivan Tsikhan (BLR)		+1	−1	0	On 29 August 2004, the IOC disqualified Hungarian hammer thrower Adrián Annus for not attending a second drugs test in Hungary after suspicions were raised that he possibly used a contraption to deceive testers. Koji Murofushi of Japan became the new gold medallist, while Belarus's Ivan Tsikhan received the silver medal and Turkey's Eşref Apak was upgraded to the bronze medal placing.
29 August 2004	Athletics, Men's hammer throw	Eşref Apak (TUR)			+1	+1	On 29 August 2004, the IOC disqualified Hungarian hammer thrower Adrián Annus for not attending a second drugs test in Hungary after suspicions were raised that he possibly used a contraption to deceive testers. Koji Murofushi of Japan became the new gold medallist, while Belarus's Ivan Tsikhan received the silver medal and Turkey's Eşref Apak was upgraded to the bronze medal placing.
Changes after the Games
3 December 2004	Equestrian, Team jumping	Ludger Beerbaum (GER) DSQ	−1		+1	0	In the team jumping event, German equestrian Ludger Beerbaum was disqualified, after his horse Goldfever tested positive for the illegal substance betamethasone. This led to the gold medal being awarded the second-placed American team Chris Kappler, Beezie Madden, McLain Ward, and Peter Wylde, and the silver medal to third-placed Peder Fredericson, Rolf-Göran Bengtsson, Peter Eriksson, and Malin Baryard of the Swedish team. Christian Ahlmann, Marco Kutscher, and Otto Becker of the German team retained a medal, as they were able to earn the bronze medal without Goldfever's results.
3 December 2004	Equestrian, Team jumping	(USA)	+1	−1		0	
3 December 2004	Equestrian, Team jumping	(SWE)		+1	−1	0	
27 March 2005	Equestrian, Individual jumping	Cian O'Connor (IRL) DSQ	−1			−1	Irish equestrian Cian O'Connor was stripped of his gold medal in individual jumping, due to the doping of his horse, Waterford Crystal, resulting in the title being awarded to Rodrigo Pessoa of Brazil, the silver medal to Chris Kappler of the United States, and the bronze medal to Marco Kutscher of Germany.
27 March 2005	Equestrian, Individual jumping	Rodrigo Pessoa (BRA)	+1	−1		0	Irish equestrian Cian O'Connor was stripped of his gold medal in individual jumping, due to the doping of his horse, Waterford Crystal, resulting in the title being awarded to Rodrigo Pessoa of Brazil, the silver medal to Chris Kappler of the United States, and the bronze medal to Marco Kutscher of Germany.
27 March 2005	Equestrian, Individual jumping	Chris Kappler (USA)		+1	−1	0	Irish equestrian Cian O'Connor was stripped of his gold medal in individual jumping, due to the doping of his horse, Waterford Crystal, resulting in the title being awarded to Rodrigo Pessoa of Brazil, the silver medal to Chris Kappler of the United States, and the bronze medal to Marco Kutscher of Germany.
27 March 2005	Equestrian, Individual jumping	Marco Kutscher (GER)			+1	+1	Irish equestrian Cian O'Connor was stripped of his gold medal in individual jumping, due to the doping of his horse, Waterford Crystal, resulting in the title being awarded to Rodrigo Pessoa of Brazil, the silver medal to Chris Kappler of the United States, and the bronze medal to Marco Kutscher of Germany.
10 August 2012	Cycling, Men's road time trial	Tyler Hamilton (USA) DSQ	−1			−1	American cyclist Tyler Hamilton, who won the gold medal in the men's road time trial, confessed that he used doping during the Olympic Games. His gold medal was reallocated to Viatcheslav Ekimov from Russia, American cyclist Bobby Julich was awarded the silver medal, and Australian cyclist Michael Rogers received bronze.
10 August 2012	Cycling, Men's road time trial	Viatcheslav Ekimov (RUS)	+1	−1		0	American cyclist Tyler Hamilton, who won the gold medal in the men's road time trial, confessed that he used doping during the Olympic Games. His gold medal was reallocated to Viatcheslav Ekimov from Russia, American cyclist Bobby Julich was awarded the silver medal, and Australian cyclist Michael Rogers received bronze.
10 August 2012	Cycling, Men's road time trial	Bobby Julich (USA)		+1	−1	0	American cyclist Tyler Hamilton, who won the gold medal in the men's road time trial, confessed that he used doping during the Olympic Games. His gold medal was reallocated to Viatcheslav Ekimov from Russia, American cyclist Bobby Julich was awarded the silver medal, and Australian cyclist Michael Rogers received bronze.
10 August 2012	Cycling, Men's road time trial	Michael Rogers (AUS)			+1	+1	American cyclist Tyler Hamilton, who won the gold medal in the men's road time trial, confessed that he used doping during the Olympic Games. His gold medal was reallocated to Viatcheslav Ekimov from Russia, American cyclist Bobby Julich was awarded the silver medal, and Australian cyclist Michael Rogers received bronze.
5 December 2012	Athletics, Men's hammer throw	Ivan Tsikhan (BLR) DSQ		−1		−1	Four Athletes were stripped of their medals on 5 December 2012 after drug re-testings of their samples were found positive. They were Belarusian Ivan Tsikhan, silver medallist in men's hammer throw, Russian Svetlana Krivelyova, bronze medallist in women's shot put, Ukrainian Yuriy Bilonoh, gold medallist in men's shot put, Belarusian Iryna Yatchenko, bronze medallist in women's discus throw. In the first two cases medals were not reallocated, as the athletes who were supposed to receive them, tested for doping themselves. On 5 March 2013, the IOC sent a statement to the Spanish Olympic Committee, taking the decision to reallocate the medals in the men's shot put, due to exclusion of Ukrainian Yuriy Bilonoh, gold medalist at the time, by doping. Based on this decision, the new owner of the gold medal will be with the second-placed American athlete Adam Nelson, the silver medal will be with the third-placed Danish Joachim Olsen, and bronze medals will be with fourth-placed Spanish Manuel Martínez. On 30 May 2013, during the meeting of the IOC Executive Board there were three new decisions of the reallocated medals. In athletics, Executive Board confirmed the reallocation of medals in men's shot put. In athletics, the athlete Věra Pospíšilová-Cechlová (Czech Republic) became the new bronze medallist in the women's discus throw. In Weightlifting, the athlete Reyhan Arabacıoğlu (Turkey) be the new bronze medalist proof in the men's 77 kg event.
5 December 2012	Athletics, Women's shot put	Svetlana Krivelyova (RUS) DSQ			−1	−1	
5 March 2013	Athletics, Men's shot put	Yuriy Bilonoh (UKR) DSQ	−1			−1	
5 March 2013	Athletics, Men's shot put	Adam Nelson (USA)	+1	−1		0	
5 March 2013	Athletics, Men's shot put	Joachim Olsen (DEN)		+1	−1	0	
5 March 2013	Athletics, Men's shot put	Manuel Martínez (ESP)			+1	+1	
30 May 2013	Athletics, Women's discus throw	Iryna Yatchenko (BLR) DSQ			−1	−1	
30 May 2013	Athletics, Women's discus throw	Věra Pospíšilová-Cechlová (CZE)			+1	+1	
30 May 2013	Weightlifting, Men's 77 kg	Oleg Perepetchenov (RUS) DSQ			−1	−1	On 12 February 2013 the IOC stripped Russian weightlifter Oleg Perepetchenov of his bronze medal in the men's 77 kg event after both probes were retested and showed traces of anabolic steroids. During the meeting of the IOC Executive Board, on 30 May 2013, it was decided that athlete Reyhan Arabacıoğlu (Turkey), originally fourth, would be the new bronze medallist in the men's 77 kg competition.
30 May 2013	Weightlifting, Men's 77 kg	Reyhan Arabacıoğlu (TUR)			+1	+1	On 12 February 2013 the IOC stripped Russian weightlifter Oleg Perepetchenov of his bronze medal in the men's 77 kg event after both probes were retested and showed traces of anabolic steroids. During the meeting of the IOC Executive Board, on 30 May 2013, it was decided that athlete Reyhan Arabacıoğlu (Turkey), originally fourth, would be the new bronze medallist in the men's 77 kg competition.
–	Athletics, Women's 4 × 400 metres relay	Crystal Cox (USA) DSQ	0			0	In 2010, Crystal Cox, who only ran for the United States team in the preliminary rounds, admitted to using anabolic steroids from 2001 to 2004. As a result, she forfeited all of her results from that time period, and agreed to a four-year suspension, until January 2014. In 2013, both the International Athletic Association Federation and the IOC announced that the result would stand and the American squad (except Cox) would be allowed to retain their gold medals due to the fact that, according to the rules of the time, a team should not be disqualified because of a doping offense of an athlete who did not compete in the finals.

List of official changes by country
NOC	Gold	Silver	Bronze	Net change
Hungary	−2	0	−1	−3
Russia	0	−1	−1	−2
Ukraine	−1	+1	−1	−1
Ireland	−1	0	0	−1
Belarus	0	0	−1	−1
Greece	0	0	−1	−1
Brazil	+1	−1	0	0
United States	+1	0	−1	0
Cuba	+1	−1	0	0
Japan	+1	−1	0	0
Lithuania	+1	−1	0	0
Denmark	0	+1	−1	0
Australia	0	0	+1	+1
Czech Republic	0	0	+1	+1
Spain	0	0	+1	+1
Estonia	0	0	+1	+1
Venezuela	0	0	+1	+1
Germany	−1	+1	+1	+1
Turkey	0	0	+2	+2

== See also ==
- All-time Olympic Games medal table
- 2004 Summer Paralympics medal table
