= 2002 World Weightlifting Championships – Men's 77 kg =

The 2002 World Weightlifting Championships were held in Warsaw, Poland from 19 November to 26 November. The men's 77 kilograms division was staged on 22 November 2002.

== Schedule ==
Date	Time	Event
22 November 2002	14:00	Group B
22 November 2002	20:00	Group A

== Medalists ==
Event	Gold		Silver		Bronze	
Snatch	Li Hongli (CHN)	172.5 kg	Georgi Markov (BUL)	170.0 kg	Mohammad Hossein Barkhah (IRI)	165.0 kg
Clean & Jerk	Oleg Perepetchenov (RUS)	202.5 kg	Reyhan Arabacıoğlu (TUR)	200.0 kg	Georgi Markov (BUL)	200.0 kg
Total	Georgi Markov (BUL)	370.0 kg	Oleg Perepetchenov (RUS)	367.5 kg	Mohammad Hossein Barkhah (IRI)	365.0 kg

== Records ==
Prior to this competition, the existing world records were as follows.

World Record	Snatch	Sergey Filimonov (KAZ)	173.0 kg	Busan, South Korea	4 October 2002
World Record	Clean & Jerk	Oleg Perepetchenov (RUS)	210.0 kg	Trenčín, Slovakia	27 April 2001
World Record	Total	Plamen Zhelyazkov (BUL)	377.5 kg	Doha, Qatar	27 March 2002

== Results ==
Rank	Athlete	Group	Body weight	Snatch (kg)				Clean & Jerk (kg)				Total
Rank	Athlete	Group	Body weight	1	2	3	Rank	1	2	3	Rank	Total
1st place, gold medalist(s)	Georgi Markov (BUL)	A	76.55	~~165.0~~	165.0	170.0	2nd place, silver medalist(s)	200.0	~~202.5~~	~~202.5~~	3rd place, bronze medalist(s)	370.0
2nd place, silver medalist(s)	Oleg Perepetchenov (RUS)	A	76.95	165.0	~~170.0~~	~~170.0~~	4	~~202.5~~	202.5	~~207.5~~	1st place, gold medalist(s)	367.5
3rd place, bronze medalist(s)	Mohammad Hossein Barkhah (IRI)	A	76.65	160.0	~~165.0~~	165.0	3rd place, bronze medalist(s)	~~200.0~~	200.0	~~202.5~~	4	365.0
4	Li Hongli (CHN)	A	76.75	165.0	170.0	172.5	1st place, gold medalist(s)	~~192.5~~	192.5	~~197.5~~	6	365.0
5	Reyhan Arabacıoğlu (TUR)	A	76.30	155.0	~~160.0~~	160.0	6	190.0	200.0	~~202.5~~	2nd place, silver medalist(s)	360.0
6	Dominik Dyderski (POL)	A	76.80	145.0	150.0	152.5	7	180.0	185.0	187.5	7	340.0
7	Vasile Hegheduș (ROM)	A	76.90	145.0	~~150.0~~	150.0	8	175.0	~~185.0~~	~~185.0~~	13	325.0
8	David Pavliashvili (GEO)	B	76.05	137.5	142.5	~~145.0~~	12	172.5	177.5	—	8	320.0
9	Annaberdi Babaýew (TKM)	B	76.50	140.0	145.0	~~150.0~~	9	170.0	175.0	~~180.0~~	10	320.0
10	José Juan Navarro (ESP)	B	76.85	145.0	~~150.0~~	~~150.0~~	11	175.0	~~180.0~~	~~182.5~~	11	320.0
11	Janusz Czaban (FRA)	B	76.10	~~137.5~~	137.5	~~142.5~~	13	167.5	172.5	177.5	9	315.0
12	Armiche Arvelo (ESP)	B	76.30	130.0	135.0	~~140.0~~	14	165.0	~~170.0~~	~~170.0~~	15	300.0
13	Sadahiro Naito (JPN)	B	76.85	~~130.0~~	~~130.0~~	130.0	15	162.5	167.5	~~172.5~~	14	297.5
—	Mohammad Ali Falahatinejad (IRI)	A	76.00	~~145.0~~	~~145.0~~	~~145.0~~	—	~~195.0~~	~~195.0~~	~~200.0~~	—	—
—	Plamen Zhelyazkov (BUL)	A	76.35	~~165.0~~	~~165.0~~	~~170.0~~	—	195.0	~~202.5~~	~~207.5~~	5	—
—	Vigen Khachatryan (ARM)	A	76.45	155.0	160.0	162.5	5	~~190.0~~	~~190.0~~	~~190.0~~	—	—
—	Sergio Mannironi (ITA)	B	76.60	~~145.0~~	145.0	~~150.0~~	10	~~175.0~~	~~175.0~~	~~175.0~~	—	—
—	Anatolijs Daškevičs (LAT)	B	76.85	~~140.0~~	~~140.0~~	~~142.5~~	—	170.0	~~175.0~~	175.0	12	—
