= List of flag bearers for Samoa at the Olympics =

Samoa at the Olympics
- IOC code: SAM
- NOC: Samoa Association of Sports and National Olympic Committee
- Website: www.sasnoc.com
- Medals: Gold 0 Silver 1 Bronze 0 Total 1

Summer appearances
- 1984; 1988; 1992; 1996; 2000; 2004; 2008; 2012; 2016; 2020; 2024

This is a list of flag bearers who have represented Samoa at the Olympics.

Flag bearers carry the national flag of their country at the opening ceremony of the Olympic Games.

#	Event year	Season	Flag bearer	Sport
1	1984	Summer	Apelu Ioane	Boxing
2	1988	Summer	Henry Smith	Athletics
3	1992	Summer		
4	1996	Summer	Bob Gasio	Boxing
5	2000	Summer	Pauga Lalau	Boxing
6	2004	Summer	Uati Maposua	Weightlifting
7	2008	Summer	Ele Opeloge	Weightlifting
8	2012	Summer	Ele Opeloge	Weightlifting
9	2016	Summer	Mary Opeloge	Weightlifting
10	2020	Summer	Alex Rose	Athletics
11	2024	Summer	Don Opeloge	Weightlifting
11	2024	Summer	Iuniarra Sipaia	Weightlifting

== See also ==
- Samoa at the Olympics
