= Weightlifting at the 2004 Summer Olympics – Men's 77 kg =

Men's 77 kg at the Games of the XXVIII Olympiad
- Venue: Nikaia Olympic Weightlifting Hall
- Date: 19 August 2004
- Competitors: 25 from 22 nations

Medalists
1st place, gold medalist(s)		Taner Sağır	Turkey
2nd place, silver medalist(s)		Sergey Filimonov	Kazakhstan
3rd place, bronze medalist(s)		Reyhan Arabacıoğlu	Turkey

The men's 77 kilograms weightlifting event at the 2004 Summer Olympics in Athens, Greece took place at the Nikaia Olympic Weightlifting Hall on 19 August.

Total score was the sum of the lifter's best result in each of the snatch and the clean and jerk, with three lifts allowed for each lift. In case of a tie, the lighter lifter won; if still tied, the lifter who took the fewest attempts to achieve the total score won. Lifters without a valid snatch score did not perform the clean and jerk.

On 12 February 2013, the International Olympic Committee decided to strip Oleg Perepetchenov of his 2004 Olympic bronze medal after both probes were retested and showed traces of anabolic steroids.

== Schedule ==
All times are Eastern European Summer Time (UTC+03:00)

Date	Time	Event
19 August 2004	10:30	Group B
19 August 2004	20:00	Group A

== Records ==
{{{caption}}}
World Record	Snatch	Sergey Filimonov (KAZ)	173.5 kg	Almaty, Kazakhstan	9 April 2004
World Record	Clean & Jerk	Oleg Perepetchenov (RUS)	210.0 kg	Trenčín, Slovakia	27 April 2001
World Record	Total	Plamen Zhelyazkov (BUL)	377.5 kg	Doha, Qatar	27 March 2002
Olympic Record	Snatch	Olympic Standard	167.5 kg	—	1 January 1997
Olympic Record	Clean & Jerk	Zhan Xugang (CHN)	207.5 kg	Sydney, Australia	22 September 2000
Olympic Record	Total	Olympic Standard	370.0 kg	—	1 January 1997

== Results ==
Rank	Athlete	Group	Body weight	Snatch (kg)				Clean & Jerk (kg)				Total
Rank	Athlete	Group	Body weight	1	2	3	Result	1	2	3	Result	Total
1st place, gold medalist(s)	Taner Sağır (TUR)	A	76.10	165.0	170.0	172.5	172.5	200.0	202.5	—	202.5	375.0
2nd place, silver medalist(s)	Sergey Filimonov (KAZ)	A	76.65	165.0	~~170.0~~	172.5	172.5	195.0	200.0	~~205.0~~	200.0	372.5
3rd place, bronze medalist(s)	Reyhan Arabacıoğlu (TUR)	A	76.04	~~165.0~~	165.0	~~167.5~~	165.0	195.0	~~200.0~~	~~200.0~~	195.0	360.0
4	Viktor Mitrou (GRE)	A	76.11	160.0	~~165.0~~	~~165.0~~	160.0	195.0	200.0	~~205.0~~	200.0	360.0
5	Mohammad Hossein Barkhah (IRI)	A	76.39	157.5	~~160.0~~	160.0	160.0	197.5	~~205.0~~	~~205.0~~	197.5	357.5
6	Attila Feri (HUN)	A	76.10	155.0	~~160.0~~	~~162.5~~	155.0	200.0	~~205.0~~	—	200.0	355.0
7	Ivan Stoitsov (BUL)	A	76.26	~~155.0~~	155.0	~~160.0~~	155.0	~~200.0~~	200.0	~~202.5~~	200.0	355.0
8	Nader Sufyan Abbas (QAT)	A	76.47	155.0	160.0	~~162.5~~	160.0	195.0	~~200.0~~	~~202.5~~	195.0	355.0
9	Kim Kwang-hoon (KOR)	A	76.00	155.0	~~160.0~~	~~160.0~~	155.0	195.0	~~210.0~~	~~210.0~~	195.0	350.0
10	Sebastian Dogariu (ROM)	B	76.96	152.5	155.0	~~157.5~~	155.0	182.5	187.5	190.0	190.0	345.0
11	Octavio Mejías (VEN)	B	76.46	147.5	152.5	155.0	155.0	~~185.0~~	185.0	187.5	187.5	342.5
12	Theoharis Trasha (ALB)	B	76.95	155.0	160.0	~~162.5~~	160.0	177.5	~~182.5~~	182.5	182.5	342.5
13	Ingo Steinhöfel (GER)	B	76.43	150.0	~~152.5~~	~~152.5~~	150.0	~~185.0~~	185.0	~~190.0~~	185.0	335.0
14	Rudolf Lukáč (SVK)	B	76.53	147.5	~~152.5~~	~~152.5~~	147.5	187.5	~~195.0~~	~~195.0~~	187.5	335.0
15	Mohamed Eshtiwi (LBA)	B	76.83	145.0	152.5	155.0	155.0	175.0	180.0	—	180.0	335.0
16	Mohamed El-Tantawy (EGY)	B	76.12	140.0	145.0	~~147.5~~	145.0	177.5	182.5	~~185.0~~	182.5	327.5
17	Carlos Andica (COL)	B	76.57	~~142.5~~	142.5	~~147.5~~	142.5	172.5	177.5	180.0	180.0	322.5
18	Chad Vaughn (USA)	B	76.90	145.0	~~150.0~~	~~150.0~~	145.0	175.0	~~180.0~~	~~180.0~~	175.0	320.0
19	René Hoch (GER)	B	76.41	135.0	140.0	142.5	142.5	165.0	~~170.0~~	170.0	170.0	312.5
20	Uati Maposua (SAM)	B	76.76	~~120.0~~	120.0	125.0	125.0	147.5	155.0	~~160.0~~	155.0	280.0
—	Gevorg Aleksanyan (ARM)	A	76.92	157.5	~~162.5~~	162.5	162.5	~~190.0~~	~~190.0~~	~~190.0~~	—	—
—	Krzysztof Szramiak (POL)	B	76.93	152.5	157.5	160.0	160.0	~~182.5~~	~~182.5~~	~~185.0~~	—	—
—	Zhan Xugang (CHN)	A	76.31	~~157.5~~	~~157.5~~	~~157.5~~	—	—	—	—	—	—
—	Vasile Hegheduș (ROM)	B	76.99	~~150.0~~	~~150.0~~	~~150.0~~	—	—	—	—	—	—
DQ	Oleg Perepetchenov (RUS)	A	76.67	165.0	167.5	170.0	170.0	195.0	~~200.0~~	~~205.0~~	195.0	~~365.0~~

- Russia's Oleg Perepetchenov originally won the bronze medal, but he was disqualified after he tested positive for anabolic steroids.

== New records ==
Snatch	170.0 kg	Taner Sağır (TUR)	OR
Snatch	172.5 kg	Taner Sağır (TUR)	OR
Total	372.5 kg	Taner Sağır (TUR)	OR
Total	375.0 kg	Taner Sağır (TUR)	OR
