= Weightlifting at the 2008 Summer Olympics – Men's 77 kg =

Men's 77 kg at the Games of the XXIX Olympiad
- Venue: Beihang University Gymnasium
- Date: 13 August 2008
- Competitors: 28 from 25 nations

Medalists
1st place, gold medalist(s)		Sa Jae-hyouk	South Korea
2nd place, silver medalist(s)		Li Hongli	China
3rd place, bronze medalist(s)		Gevorg Davtyan	Armenia

The men's 77 kilograms weightlifting event was the fourth lightest men's event at the weightlifting competition, limiting competitors to a maximum of 77 kilograms of body mass. The whole competition took place on August 13, but was divided in two parts due to the number of competitors. Group B weightlifters competed at 10:00, and Group A at 19:00. This event was the ninth weightlifting event to conclude.

Each lifter performed in both the snatch and clean and jerk lifts, with the final score being the sum of the lifter's best result in each. The athlete received three attempts in each of the two lifts; the score for the lift was the heaviest weight successfully lifted.

== Schedule ==
All times are China Standard Time (UTC+08:00)

Date	Time	Event
13 August 2008	10:00	Group B
13 August 2008	19:00	Group A

== Records ==
{{{caption}}}
World Record	Snatch	Sergey Filimonov (KAZ)	173 kg	Almaty, Kazakhstan	9 April 2004
World Record	Clean & Jerk	Oleg Perepetchenov (RUS)	210 kg	Trenčín, Slovakia	27 April 2001
World Record	Total	Plamen Zhelyazkov (BUL)	377 kg	Doha, Qatar	27 March 2002
Olympic Record	Snatch	Taner Sağır (TUR)	172 kg	Athens, Greece	19 August 2004
Olympic Record	Clean & Jerk	Zhan Xugang (CHN)	207 kg	Sydney, Australia	22 September 2000
Olympic Record	Total	Taner Sağır (TUR)	375 kg	Athens, Greece	19 August 2004

== Results ==
Rank	Athlete	Group	Body weight	Snatch (kg)				Clean & Jerk (kg)				Total
Rank	Athlete	Group	Body weight	1	2	3	Result	1	2	3	Result	Total
1st place, gold medalist(s)	Sa Jae-hyouk (KOR)	A	76.46	160	163	~~165~~	163	201	203	~~211~~	203	366
2nd place, silver medalist(s)	Li Hongli (CHN)	A	76.91	163	168	~~170~~	168	193	~~198~~	198	198	366
3rd place, bronze medalist(s)	Gevorg Davtyan (ARM)	A	76.77	~~165~~	~~165~~	165	165	~~195~~	195	~~201~~	195	360
4	Kim Kwang-hoon (KOR)	A	76.86	~~155~~	155	~~160~~	155	200	~~206~~	~~206~~	200	355
5	Oleg Perepetchenov (RUS)	A	76.80	158	162	~~165~~	162	192	~~199~~	~~199~~	192	354
6	Iván Cambar (CUB)	A	76.53	152	157	~~160~~	157	190	~~196~~	196	196	353
7	Ara Khachatryan (ARM)	A	76.78	162	~~166~~	~~166~~	162	191	~~195~~	~~195~~	191	353
8	Krzysztof Szramiak (POL)	A	76.71	157	161	~~165~~	161	~~191~~	191	~~194~~	191	352
9	Vladimir Kuznetsov (KAZ)	A	76.86	155	~~160~~	160	160	~~191~~	191	~~197~~	191	351
10	Siarhei Lahun (BLR)	A	76.56	153	~~157~~	157	157	187	192	~~196~~	192	349
11	Sandow Nasution (INA)	A	76.92	145	~~152~~	153	153	185	194	~~200~~	194	347
12	Mahmoud El-Haddad (EGY)	A	76.73	145	150	~~155~~	150	192	~~198~~	~~198~~	192	342
13	Erkand Qerimaj (ALB)	B	76.52	145	150	154	154	182	187	~~193~~	187	341
14	Giovanni Bardis (FRA)	B	76.83	149	153	156	156	173	~~178~~	~~178~~	173	329
15	Felix Ekpo (NGR)	B	75.83	143	~~148~~	~~150~~	143	178	182	~~185~~	183	325
16	Sherzodjon Yusupov (UZB)	B	76.24	140	144	~~148~~	144	178	~~185~~	~~185~~	178	322
17	José Ocando (VEN)	B	76.90	~~140~~	~~140~~	140	140	~~182~~	182	~~186~~	182	322
18	Răzvan Rusu (ROU)	B	76.69	130	135	140	140	170	~~175~~	~~175~~	170	310
19	Carlos Espeleta (ARG)	B	76.93	~~140~~	140	~~145~~	140	~~170~~	~~170~~	170	170	310
20	Andrei Guțu (MDA)	B	76.38	140	145	~~147~~	145	160	~~165~~	~~165~~	160	305
21	Richie Patterson (NZL)	B	76.57	130	~~137~~	~~137~~	130	170	~~176~~	~~176~~	170	300
22	Darryn Anthony (RSA)	B	76.98	~~135~~	135	~~144~~	135	160	~~170~~	~~173~~	160	295
23	Josefa Vueti (FIJ)	B	76.15	115	120	124	124	155	~~162~~	~~162~~	155	279
24	Romain Marchessou (MON)	B	75.53	105	110	~~115~~	110	135	140	~~145~~	140	250
—	János Baranyai (HUN)	B	76.92	140	145	~~148~~	145	—	—	—	—	—
—	Octavio Mejías (VEN)	A	76.53	152	~~157~~	~~157~~	152	~~185~~	~~185~~	~~185~~	—	—
—	Taner Sağır (TUR)	A	76.73	~~165~~	~~165~~	~~165~~	—	—	—	—	—	—
—	Chad Vaughn (USA)	B	76.81	~~144~~	144	147	147	~~182~~	~~182~~	~~182~~	—	—
