= 2001 World Weightlifting Championships – Men's 77 kg =

The 2001 World Weightlifting Championships were held in Antalya, Turkey from November 4 to November 11. The men's competition in the middleweight (77 kg) division was staged on 7 November 2001.

== Medalists ==
Event	Gold		Silver		Bronze	
Snatch	Plamen Zhelyazkov (BUL)	165.0 kg	Nader Sufyan Abbas (QAT)	162.5 kg	Mohammad Hossein Barkhah (IRI)	162.5 kg
Clean & Jerk	Nader Sufyan Abbas (QAT)	202.5 kg	Oleg Perepetchenov (RUS)	200.0 kg	Attila Feri (HUN)	200.0 kg
Total	Nader Sufyan Abbas (QAT)	365.0 kg	Oleg Perepetchenov (RUS)	360.0 kg	Mohammad Hossein Barkhah (IRI)	360.0 kg

== Records ==
Prior to this competition, the existing world records were as follows.

World Record	Snatch	Khachatur Kyapanaktsyan (ARM)	170.5 kg	Athens, Greece	25 November 1999
World Record	Clean & Jerk	Oleg Perepetchenov (RUS)	210.0 kg	Trenčín, Slovakia	27 April 2001
World Record	Total	Oleg Perepetchenov (RUS)	375.0 kg	Trenčín, Slovakia	27 April 2001

== Results ==
Rank	Athlete	Body weight	Snatch (kg)				Clean & Jerk (kg)				Total
Rank	Athlete	Body weight	1	2	3	Rank	1	2	3	Rank	Total
1st place, gold medalist(s)	Nader Sufyan Abbas (QAT)	76.36	~~157.5~~	157.5	162.5	2nd place, silver medalist(s)	195.0	~~202.5~~	202.5	1st place, gold medalist(s)	365.0
2nd place, silver medalist(s)	Oleg Perepetchenov (RUS)	76.28	160.0	~~165.0~~	~~165.0~~	4	200.0	~~205.0~~	~~205.0~~	2nd place, silver medalist(s)	360.0
3rd place, bronze medalist(s)	Mohammad Hossein Barkhah (IRI)	76.42	157.5	162.5	~~165.0~~	3rd place, bronze medalist(s)	197.5	~~202.5~~	~~205.0~~	4	360.0
4	Plamen Zhelyazkov (BUL)	76.56	165.0	~~170.0~~	~~170.0~~	1st place, gold medalist(s)	~~195.0~~	~~195.0~~	195.0	5	360.0
5	Attila Feri (HUN)	76.60	155.0	160.0	~~162.5~~	6	200.0	~~205.0~~	~~205.0~~	3rd place, bronze medalist(s)	360.0
6	Andrzej Kozłowski (POL)	76.58	150.0	155.0	160.0	5	185.0	190.0	195.0	6	355.0
7	Adrián Popa (HUN)	76.34	147.5	152.5	155.0	7	192.5	~~197.5~~	~~197.5~~	7	347.5
8	Vasile Hegheduș (ROM)	76.20	~~150.0~~	150.0	~~155.0~~	8	~~180.0~~	~~180.0~~	180.0	10	330.0
9	Héctor Ballesteros (COL)	76.46	140.0	145.0	~~147.5~~	10	180.0	185.0	~~187.5~~	8	330.0
10	Jugnevis Campos (VEN)	76.52	142.5	147.5	~~150.0~~	9	182.5	~~187.5~~	~~187.5~~	9	330.0
11	Satheesha Rai (IND)	76.68	135.0	140.0	~~145.0~~	11	175.0	~~180.0~~	180.0	11	320.0
12	José Juan Navarro (ESP)	76.82	137.5	~~142.5~~	~~142.5~~	12	165.0	170.0	~~175.0~~	12	307.5
13	Pavel Kolosovski (ISR)	76.02	120.0	~~127.5~~	~~127.5~~	13	140.0	150.0	~~155.0~~	13	270.0
—	Artan Suli (ALB)	76.38	~~150.0~~	~~150.0~~	~~150.0~~	—	~~180.0~~	~~180.0~~	~~182.5~~	—	—
DQ	Arsen Melikyan (ARM)	76.70	~~165.0~~	165.0	~~171.0~~	—	200.0	~~205.0~~	~~205.0~~	—	—
