= Attila Feri =

Romanian weightlifter

Personal information
- Born: September 24, 1968 (age 57) Târgu Mureș, Romania
Medal record
Men's Weightlifting
Representing Hungary
Olympic Games
Bronze medal – third place	1996 Atlanta	70 kg

Attila Feri (born 24 September 1968 in Târgu Mureș) is a retired weightlifter who competed for Romania in 1992 Summer Olympics and later for Hungary and he won a Bronze medal in the 70 kg in the 1996 Summer Olympics in Atlanta while competing for Hungary.

== Major results ==
Year	Venue	Weight	Snatch (kg)					Clean & Jerk (kg)					Total	Rank
Year	Venue	Weight	1	2	3	Results	Rank	1	2	3	Results	Rank	Total	Rank
Representing Hungary
Olympic Games
2004	Athens, Greece	77 kg	155.0	~~160.0~~	~~162.5~~	155.0	11	200.0	~~205.0~~	—	200.0	2	355.0	6
1996	Atlanta, United States	70 kg	~~152.5~~	152.5	~~155.0~~	152.5	4	~~187.5~~	187.5	~~192.5~~	187.5	2	340.0	3rd place, bronze medalist(s)
World Championships
2001	Antalya, Turkey	77 kg	155.0	160.0	~~162.5~~	160.0	6	200.0	~~205.0~~	~~205.0~~	200.0	3rd place, bronze medalist(s)	360.0	5
1998	Lahti, Finland	77 kg	155.0	~~160.0~~	~~160.0~~	155.0	12	~~200.0~~	~~200.0~~	~~200.0~~	—	—	—	—
1995	Guangzhou, China	70 kg	~~150.0~~	150.0	~~152.5~~	150.0	5	~~187.5~~	187.5	190.0	190.0	1st place, gold medalist(s)	340.0	4
1994	Istanbul, Turkey	70 kg	145.0	~~150.0~~	~~150.0~~	145.0	7	185.0	190.0	~~193.0~~	190.0	1st place, gold medalist(s)	335.0	5
European Championships
2001	Trenčín, Slovakia	77 kg	152.5	~~157.5~~	~~157.5~~	152.5	4	192.5	197.5	~~202.5~~	197.5	2nd place, silver medalist(s)	350.0	3rd place, bronze medalist(s)
2000	Sofia, Bulgaria	77 kg	155.0	157.5	~~160.0~~	157.5	8	~~200.0~~	~~200.0~~	—	—	—	—	—
1998	Riesa, Germany	77 kg	145.0	~~150.0~~	150.0	150.0	8	190.0	~~195.0~~	195.0	195.0	3rd place, bronze medalist(s)	345.0	6
1997	Rijeka, Croatia	70 kg	~~150.0~~	~~150.0~~	~~150.0~~	—	—	~~187.5~~	~~187.5~~	~~187.5~~	—	—	—	—
1995	Warsaw, Poland	70 kg	—N/a	—N/a	—N/a	150.0	5	—N/a	—N/a	—N/a	190.0	2nd place, silver medalist(s)	340.0	3rd place, bronze medalist(s)
Representing Romania
Olympic Games
1992	Barcelona, Spain	67.5 kg	125.0	130.0	~~132.5~~	130.0	12	160.0	~~170.0~~	—	160.0	10	290.0	12
European Championships
1993	Sofia, Bulgaria	70 kg	—N/a	—N/a	—N/a	135.0	11	—N/a	—N/a	—N/a	180.0	6	315.0	8
1992	Szekszárd, Hungary	67.5 kg	—N/a	—N/a	—N/a	140.0	6	—N/a	—N/a	—N/a	182.5	2nd place, silver medalist(s)	322.5	4
1991	Władysławowo, Poland	67.5 kg	—N/a	—N/a	—N/a	130.0	7	—N/a	—N/a	—N/a	175.0	4	305.0	6
1990	Aalborg, Denmark	67.5 kg	—N/a	—N/a	—N/a	135.0	7	—N/a	—N/a	—N/a	175.0	3rd place, bronze medalist(s)	310.0	4
