= Samoa at the Olympics =

- IOC code: SAM
- NOC: Samoa Association of Sports and National Olympic Committee
- Website: www.sasnoc.com
- Medals Ranked 137th: Gold 0 Silver 1 Bronze 0 Total 1

Summer appearances
- 1984; 1988; 1992; 1996; 2000; 2004; 2008; 2012; 2016; 2020; 2024

Samoa (previously Western Samoa until 1996) first participated at the Olympic Games in 1984, and has sent athletes to compete in every Summer Olympic Games since then. The nation has never participated in the Winter Olympic Games.

The National Olympic Committee for Samoa was created in 1983 and recognized by the International Olympic Committee that same year.

Samoa was retroactively awarded its first medal at the 2008 Games in Beijing after originally finishing fourth in the women's +75 kg category in weightlifting, as the silver and bronze medallists were stripped of their medals in 2016 for doping.

== Medal tables ==
=== Medals by Summer Games ===
Games	Athletes	Gold	Silver	Bronze	Total	Rank
(United States) 1984 Los Angeles	8	0	0	0	0	–
(South Korea) 1988 Seoul	11	0	0	0	0	–
(Spain) 1992 Barcelona	5	0	0	0	0	–
(United States) 1996 Atlanta	5	0	0	0	0	–
(Australia) 2000 Sydney	5	0	0	0	0	–
(Greece) 2004 Athens	3	0	0	0	0	–
(China) 2008 Beijing	6	0	1	0	1	70
(United Kingdom) 2012 London	8	0	0	0	0	–
(Brazil) 2016 Rio de Janeiro	8	0	0	0	0	–
(Japan) 2020 Tokyo	8	0	0	0	0	–
(France) 2024 Paris	24	0	0	0	0	–
(United States) 2028 Los Angeles	future event					
(Australia) 2032 Brisbane	future event					
Total		0	1	0	1	137

=== Medals by sport ===
Sport	Gold	Silver	Bronze	Total
Weightlifting	0	1	0	1
Totals (1 entries)	0	1	0	1

== List of medalists ==
Medal	Name	Games	Sport	Event
Silver	Ele Opeloge	2008 Beijing	Weightlifting	Women's +75 kg

== See also ==
- List of flag bearers for Samoa at the Olympics
- Samoa at the Paralympics
