= Samoa at the 2008 Summer Paralympics =

- IPC code: SAM
- NPC: Samoa Paralympic Committee

in Beijing
- Competitors: 1 in 1 sport
- Flag bearer: Mose Faatamala
- Medals: Gold 0 Silver 0 Bronze 0 Total 0

Summer Paralympics appearances (overview)
- 2000; 2004; 2008; 2012; 2016; 2020–2024

Samoa competed at the 2008 Summer Paralympics in Beijing, China. The country's delegation consisted of a single competitor, track and field athlete Mose Faatamala. It was Faatamala's third consecutive appearance at the Summer Paralympics.

== Athletics ==
Athlete	Event	Heat		Semifinal		Final	
Athlete	Event	Result	Rank	Result	Rank	Result	Rank
Mose Faatamala	Men's long jump F46	N/A				5.28	9

== See also ==
- Samoa at the Paralympics
- Samoa at the 2008 Summer Olympics
