= Vasile Hegheduș =

Romanian weightlifter

Personal information
- Nationality: Romanian
- Born: 10 March 1979 (age 46); Bistrița, Romania

Sport
- Sport: Weightlifting

Vasile Hegheduș (born 10 March 1979) is a Romanian former weightlifter. He competed in the men's middleweight event at the 2004 Summer Olympics.

He finished 20th at the 1999 World Championships, 8th at the 2001 World Championships, seventh at the 2002 World Championships, 12th at the 2003 World Championships and no-marked at the 2004 European Championships.

He was involved in a nightclub altercation in Bistrița in 2002.
