= Samoa at the 2004 Summer Paralympics =

- IPC code: SAM
- NPC: Samoa Paralympic Committee

in Athens
- Competitors: 2 in 1 sport
- Medals: Gold 0 Silver 0 Bronze 0 Total 0

Summer Paralympics appearances (overview)
- 2000; 2004; 2008; 2012; 2016; 2020–2024

Samoa competed at the 2004 Summer Paralympics in Athens. The country was represented by two athletes, both competing in track and field. Neither won a medal.

== Athletics ==
Name	Event	Result	Rank
Mose Faatamala	Men's Javelin F44/46	37.37 m (671 pts)	11th (out of 12)
Meira Vaa	Women's Discus F56-58	18.54 m (597 pts)	17th (out of 19)

== See also ==
- 2004 Summer Paralympics
- Samoa at the Paralympics
- Samoa at the 2004 Summer Olympics
