= Răzvan Rusu =

Romanian weightlifter

Răzvan Rusu (born March 4, 1988, in București) is a Romanian weightlifter.

At the 2008 Junior World Weightlifting Championships he ranked 9th in the 85 kg category, with a total of 313 kg.

He competed in Weightlifting at the 2008 Summer Olympics in the 77 kg division finishing eighteenth with 310 kg.

He is 5 ft 9 inches tall and weighs 170 lb.
