= Samoa at the 2012 Summer Paralympics =

- IPC code: SAM
- NPC: Samoa Paralympic Committee

in London
- Competitors: 2 in 1 sport
- Flag bearer: Milo Toleafoa
- Medals: Gold 0 Silver 0 Bronze 0 Total 0

Summer Paralympics appearances (overview)
- 2000; 2004; 2008; 2012; 2016; 2020–2024

An interview with the Samoa Chef de Mission in London

Samoa participated in the 2012 Summer Paralympics in London, United Kingdom, from August 29 to September 9.

The country was represented by two athletes, both in track and field. They did not qualify for the Games and received a wild card invitation to compete. Sprinter Milo Toleafoa was the country's flag-bearer during the Games' opening ceremony.

Samoa did not win a medal at these Games.

== Athletics ==
Milo Toleafoa competed in the men's 400m T38 (cerebral palsy, with a comparatively low level of disability). Toleafoa is a T37 athlete, with a somewhat greater level of disability, but there was no specific T37 event in the 400 metres. Toleafoa was the flag bearer for the opening ceremonies. In heat 2, he finished fourth out of five, in 1:09.97 - almost fifteen seconds behind the top three athletes, but more than four seconds ahead of Timor-Leste's Filomeno Soares.

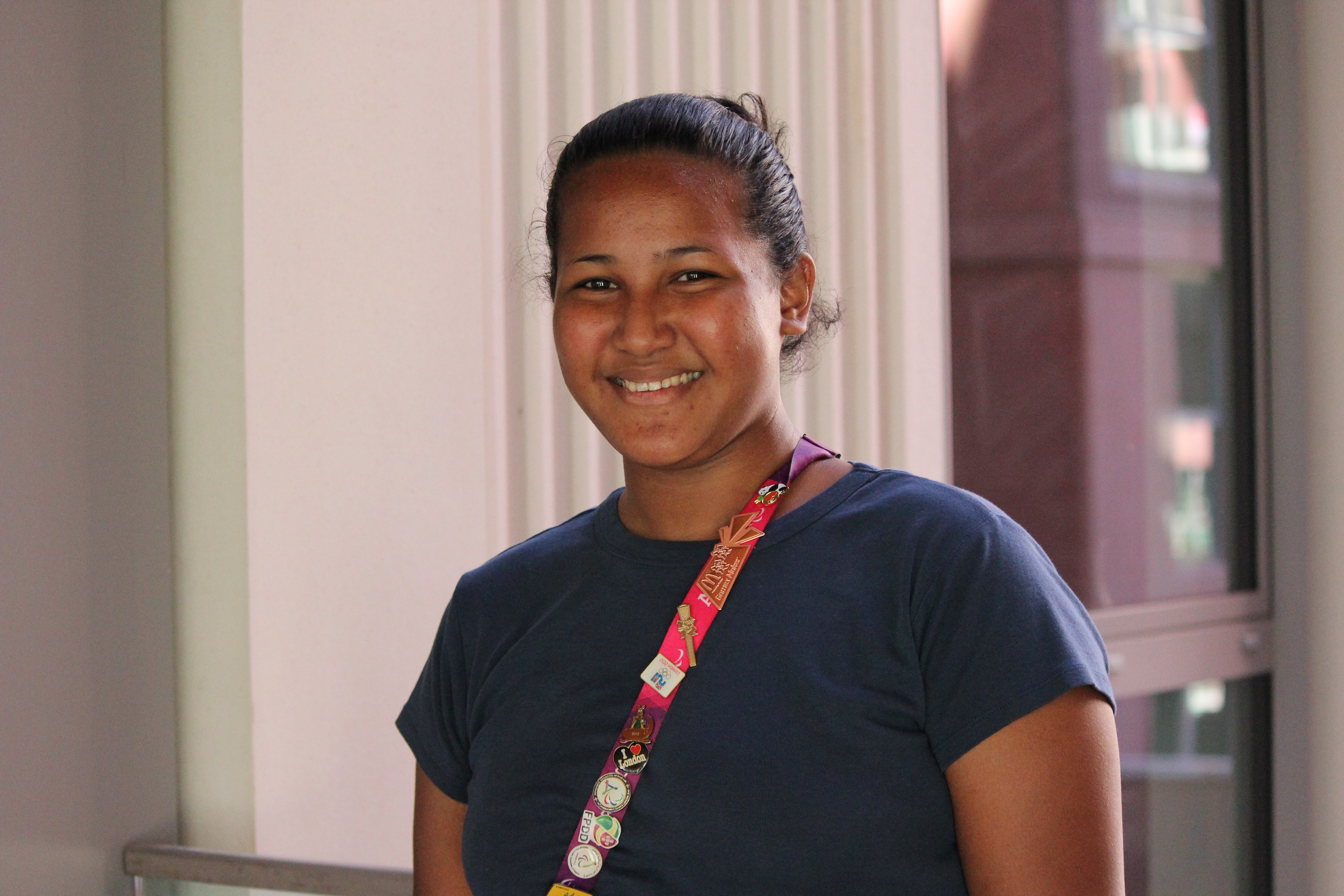
Leitu Viliamu

Leitu Viliamu competed in the women's shot put F42-44 (lower limb amputee). She is a T42 athlete, with a greater degree of disability than some of the other competitors, but this is factored into the scoring. Her best throw was 5.32 metres, earning her 257 points; she finished a distant sixth and last.

=== Men's track and road events ===
Athlete	Event	Heat		Final	
Athlete	Event	Result	Rank	Result	Rank
Milo Toleafoa	400m T38	1:09.97	4	did not advance	

=== Women's field events ===
Athlete	Event	Distance	Points	Rank
Leitu Viliamu	Shot Put F42-44	5.32	257	6

== See also ==
- Summer Paralympic disability classification
- Samoa at the Paralympics
- Samoa at the 2012 Summer Olympics
