= Samoa at the 2000 Summer Paralympics =

- IPC code: SAM
- NPC: Samoa Paralympic Committee

in Sydney
- Competitors: 1 in 1 sport
- Medals: Gold 0 Silver 0 Bronze 0 Total 0

Summer Paralympics appearances (overview)
- 2000; 2004; 2008; 2012; 2016; 2020–2024

Samoa competed at the 2000 Summer Paralympics in Sydney. The country made its Paralympic début by sending a single athlete, Mose Faatamala, to compete in track and field. Faatamala did not win a medal.

== Athletics ==
Name	Event	Result	Rank
Mose Faatamala	Men's 100 m T46	12.41 s	6th (out of 8) in heat 3; did not advance.
Mose Faatamala	Men's Javelin F46	37.81 m	7th (out of 8)

== See also ==
- 2000 Summer Paralympics
- Samoa at the Paralympics
- Samoa at the 2000 Summer Olympics
