= Samoa at the Paralympics =

- IPC code: SAM
- NPC: Samoa Paralympic Committee
- Medals: Gold 0 Silver 0 Bronze 0 Total 0

Summer appearances
- 2000; 2004; 2008; 2012; 2016; 2020–2024

Samoa first competed at the Summer Paralympic Games in 2000, sending a single athlete to compete in track and field. The country has participated in every Summer Paralympics since then, but has never taken part in the Winter Paralympic Games, and has never won a Paralympic medal. Samoans have only ever competed in track and field events.

== Full results for Samoa at the Paralympics ==
Name	Games	Sport	Event	Result	Rank
Mose Faatamala	2000 Sydney	Athletics	Men's 100 m T46	12.41 s	6th (out of 8) in heat 3; did not advance
Mose Faatamala	2000 Sydney	Athletics	Men's Javelin F46	37.81 m	7th (out of 8)
Mose Faatamala	2004 Athens	Athletics	Men's Javelin F44/46	37.37 m (671 pts)	11th (out of 12)
Meira Vaa	2004 Athens	Athletics	Women's Discus F56-58	18.54 m (597 pts)	17th (out of 19)
Mose Faatamala	2008 Beijing	Athletics	Men's long jump F46	5.28 m (758 pts)	9th (out of 10)
Milo Toleafoa	2012 London	Athletics	Men's 400 m T38	1:09.97	4th (last) in heat 2; did not advance
Leitu Viliamu	2012 London	Athletics	Women's shot put F42/44	5.32 m	6th (last)
Alefosio Laki	2016 Rio	Athletics	Men's discus throw F37	33.53 m	12th (last)
Maggie Aiono	2016 Rio	Athletics	Women's discus throw F44	19.56 m	11th (out of 12)

== See also ==
- Samoa at the Olympics
