= Sebastian Dogariu =

Romanian weightlifter (born 1977)

Personal information
- Nationality: Romania
- Born: 10 September 1977 (age 48)
- Height: 1.78 m (5 ft 10 in)
- Weight: 76.69 kg (169.1 lb)

Sport
- Country: Romania
- Sport: Weightlifting
- Event: –77 kg
Medal record
World Championships
Silver medal – second place	2005 Doha	–77 kg

Sebastian Dogariu (born 10 September 1977) is a former Romanian weightlifter, and Olympian who competed in the 77 kg category.

== Career ==
He competed at the 2004 Summer Olympics in the 77 kg category, finishing 10th overall.

He was the silver medalist at the 2005 World Weightlifting Championships in the 77 kg division.

== Major results ==
Year	Venue	Weight	Snatch (kg)				Clean & Jerk (kg)				Total	Rank
Year	Venue	Weight	1	2	3	Rank	1	2	3	Rank	Total	Rank
Olympic Games
2004	Athens, Greece	77 kg	152.5	155.0	~~157.5~~	15	182.5	187.5	190.0	10	345.0	10
World Championships
2003	Vancouver, Canada	77 kg	152.5	~~157.5~~	~~157.5~~	12	~~182.5~~	182.5	187.5	9	340.0	7
2005	Doha, Qatar	77 kg	155	160	163	2nd place, silver medalist(s)	185	~~190~~	190	5	353	2nd place, silver medalist(s)
