= Zulkifli Che Ros =

Malaysian weightlifter

Personal information
- Full name: Zulkifli Che Ros
- Born: 7 July 1985 (age 40) Rompin, Pahang, Malaysia
- Weight: 76.80 kg (169.3 lb)

Sport
- Country: Malaysia
- Sport: Weightlifting
- Weight class: 77 kg
- Team: National team
- Updated on 9 September 2016

Zulkifli Che Ros (born 7 July 1985) is a Malaysian male weightlifter from Sarawak, competing in the 77 kg category and representing Malaysia at international competitions. He competed at world championships, most recently at the 2007 World Weightlifting Championships.

== Major results ==
Year	Venue	Weight	Snatch (kg)				Clean & Jerk (kg)				Total	Rank
Year	Venue	Weight	1	2	3	Rank	1	2	3	Rank	Total	Rank
World Championships
2007	Chiang Mai, Thailand	77 kg	~~132~~	~~132~~	132	39	~~163~~	163	166	37	298	34
