= Samoa at the 2004 Summer Olympics =

- IOC code: SAM
- NOC: Samoa Association of Sports and National Olympic Committee Inc.
- Website: www.oceaniasport.com/samoa

in Athens
- Competitors: 3 in 2 sports
- Flag bearer: Uati Maposua
- Medals: Gold 0 Silver 0 Bronze 0 Total 0

Summer Olympics appearances (overview)
- 1984; 1988; 1992; 1996; 2000; 2004; 2008; 2012; 2016; 2020; 2024

Samoa competed at the 2004 Summer Olympics in Athens, Greece, from 13 to 29 August 2004.

== Athletics ==
Samoan athletes have so far achieved qualifying standards in the following athletics events (up to a maximum of 3 athletes in each event at the 'A' Standard, and 1 at the 'B' Standard).

Men

Athlete	Event	Qualification		Final	
Athlete	Event	Distance	Position	Distance	Position
Shaka Sola	Discus throw	51.10	36	did not advance	

Women

Athlete	Event	Qualification		Final	
Athlete	Event	Distance	Position	Distance	Position
Serafina Akeli	Javelin throw	45.93	44	did not advance	

Key

- Note–Ranks given for track events are within the athlete's heat only
- Q = Qualified for the next round
- q = Qualified for the next round as a fastest loser or, in field events, by position without achieving the qualifying target
- NR = National record
- N/A = Round not applicable for the event
- Bye = Athlete not required to compete in round

== Weightlifting ==
Samoa has qualified a single weightlifter.

Athlete	Event	Snatch		Clean & Jerk		Total	Rank
Athlete	Event	Result	Rank	Result	Rank	Total	Rank
Uati Maposua	Men's −77 kg	125	22	155	20	280	20

== See also ==
- Samoa at the 2004 Summer Paralympics
