= Gevorg Aleksanyan =

Armenian weightlifter (born 1981)

Gevorg Aleksanyan (Armenian: Գևորգ Ալեքսանյան, born July 4, 1981, in Armenian SSR) is an Armenian weightlifter. He competed at the 2004 Summer Olympics in the men's 77 kg division.
