= Mohammad Hossein Barkhah =

Iranian weightlifter (born 1977)

Medal record

Men's weightlifting

Representing Iran

World Championships
Bronze medal – third place	2001 Antalya	77 kg
Bronze medal – third place	2002 Warsaw	77 kg

Asian Games
Silver medal – second place	1998 Bangkok	77 kg
Silver medal – second place	2002 Busan	77 kg

Asian Championships
Bronze medal – third place	1999 Wuhan	77 kg
Silver medal – second place	2003 Qinhuangdao	85 kg

Mohammad Hossein Barkhah (Persian: محمد حسین برخواه, born 24 January 1977 in Tehran) is a retired Iranian weightlifting champion. In 2003, while in Vancouver, Canada, at a competition, he twisted one of his arms while performing a snatch. He represented the Islamic Republic of Iran in weightlifting in both the 2000 and 2004 Olympics.

== Major results ==
Year	Venue	Weight	Snatch (kg)				Clean & Jerk (kg)				Total	Rank
Year	Venue	Weight	1	2	3	Rank	1	2	3	Rank	Total	Rank
Olympic Games
2000	Sydney, Australia	77 kg	~~157.5~~	~~157.5~~	~~160~~	--	--	--	--	--	--	--
2004	Athens, Greece	77 kg	157.5	~~160.0~~	160	6	197.5	~~205.0~~	~~205.0~~	6	357.5	5
World Championships
1999	Piraeus, Greece	77 kg	155	160	~~162.5~~	11	~~195~~	~~195~~	~~197.5~~	--	--	--
2001	Antalya, Turkey	77 kg	157.5	162.5	~~165~~	3rd place, bronze medalist(s)	197.5	~~202.5~~	~~205~~	4	360	3rd place, bronze medalist(s)
2002	Warsaw, Poland	77 kg	160	~~165~~	165	3rd place, bronze medalist(s)	~~200~~	200	~~202.5~~	4	365	3rd place, bronze medalist(s)
2003	Vancouver, Canada	77 kg	160	~~165~~	--	4	--	--	--	--	--	--
Asian Games
1998	Bangkok, Thailand	77 kg	155			4	197.5			1	352.5	2nd place, silver medalist(s)
2002	Busan, South Korea	77 kg	160	~~165~~	~~165~~	3	197.5	202.5	~~205~~	2	362.5	2nd place, silver medalist(s)
Asian Championships
1999	Wuhan, China	77 kg	155			3rd place, bronze medalist(s)	190			4	345	3rd place, bronze medalist(s)
2003	Qinhuangdao, China	85 kg	155			2nd place, silver medalist(s)	205			1st place, gold medalist(s)	360	2nd place, silver medalist(s)
World Junior Championships
1997	Cape Town, South Africa	76 kg	145	~~150~~	150	2nd place, silver medalist(s)	~~180~~	180	~~192.5~~	3rd place, bronze medalist(s)	330	2nd place, silver medalist(s)
