= Samoa at the 2016 Summer Paralympics =

- IPC code: SAM
- NPC: Samoa Paralympic Committee

in Rio de Janeiro
- Competitors: 2 in 1 sports
- Medals: Gold 0 Silver 0 Bronze 0 Total 0

Summer Paralympics appearances (overview)
- 2000; 2004; 2008; 2012; 2016; 2020–2024

Samoa competed at the 2016 Summer Paralympics in Rio de Janeiro, Brazil, from 7 to 18 September 2016, sending two discus athletes, one male and one female. This was Samoa's fifth consecutive Paralympics, with their first Paralympics in 2000. Alefosio ‘Sio’ Laki finished 12th, setting a new personal record. Maggie Aiono finished the Paralympics in 11th place. As of the conclusion of these Paralympics, Samoa has not won a Paralympic medal.

== Background ==
Samoa's first Paralympic appearance was in 2000. The country has competed in every Summer Paralympics since then, and has never participated in a Winter Paralympics. As of these Paralympics, the country has never medalled.

== Disability classifications ==
Every participant at the Paralympics has their disability grouped into one of five disability categories; amputation, the condition may be congenital or sustained through injury or illness; cerebral palsy; wheelchair athletes, there is often overlap between this and other categories; visual impairment, including blindness; Les autres, any physical disability that does not fall strictly under one of the other categories, for example dwarfism or multiple sclerosis. Each Paralympic sport then has its own classifications, dependent upon the specific physical demands of competition. Events are given a code, made of numbers and letters, describing the type of event and classification of the athletes competing. Some sports, such as athletics, divide athletes by both the category and severity of their disabilities, other sports, for example swimming, group competitors from different categories together, the only separation being based on the severity of the disability.

== Athletics ==
Alefosio ‘Sio’ Laki qualified to represent Samoa at the 2016 Summer Paralympics in Rio in the discus. He started participating in discus three years prior. Laki is based in Australia, but both of his parents are from Samoa. His representation for Samoa came about because of a relationship developed with the Samoans by Athletics Australia. Laki has cerebral palsy, and went to Rio when he was a year 12 student at Hampton Park Secondary College. He prepared for the Paralympics by training for three hours per day at the track three times a week and the gym three times a week. Laki threw a personal best distance of 33.53 meters. He placed 12th in the competition out of the 12 participants.

Maggie Aiono received a wildcard spot to compete in the discus event. Her left foot was amputated after a car accident in 1994, and she uses a prosthetic. The Paralympic Committee also gave Aiono a new prothesis for walking and one specially for discus throwing. Aiono used to do shotput, but changed to discus a couple of months before the Paralympics. She received her new prosthetic leg just before arriving at Rio. Aiono was Samoa's flag bearer for these Paralympics. Aiono finished 11th out of 12 in the event, with a throw of 19.56 meters.

=== Men's field ===
Athlete	Events	Result	Rank
Alefosio Laki	Discus F37	33.53	12

=== Women's field ===
Athlete	Events	Result	Rank
Maggie Aiono	Discus F43-44	19.56	11

== See also ==
- Samoa at the 2016 Summer Olympics
