= Eleei Lalio =

American Samoan weightlifter

Personal information
- Born: August 19, 1979 (age 46)
- Height: 1.7 m (5 ft 7 in)
- Weight: 103 kg (227 lb)

Sport
- Country: American Samoa
- Sport: Weightlifting

Eleei Lalio (born 19 August 1979) is a weightlifter from American Samoa.

Lalio competed at the 2004 Summer Olympics in the heavyweight division, he finished 14th out of the 22 starters.
