= Darryn Anthony =

South African weightlifter (born 1985)

Personal information
- Nationality: South Africa
- Born: 18 December 1985 (age 40)
- Height: 1.72 m (5 ft 7 1/2 in)
- Weight: 77 kg (170 lb)

Sport
- Sport: Weightlifting
- Event: 77 kg

Darryn Anthony (born 18 December 1985) is a South African weightlifter. Anthony represented South Africa at the 2008 Summer Olympics in Beijing, where he competed for the men's middleweight category (77 kg). Anthony placed twenty-second in this event, as he successfully lifted 135 kg in the single-motion snatch, and hoisted 160 kg in the two-part, shoulder-to-overhead clean and jerk, for a total of 295 kg.
