= Nikaia Olympic Weightlifting Hall =

Indoor arena in Piraeus, Greece

Coordinates: 37°58′14″N 23°38′02″E

The Nikaia Olympic Weightlifting Hall is an indoor arena in Nikaia, in Piraeus. It hosted the weightlifting events at the 2004 Summer Olympics in Greece. The venue was officially opened on August 14, 2004, the day after the beginning of the Games. The building had a capacity of 5,100, though only 3,500 seats are publicly available for the games.

== History ==
After the 2004 Olympics, the facility has hosted fencing competitions, but was recently turned over to the University of Piraeus, for use as an academic lecture and conference center.
