= Andrei Guțu =

Moldovan-Romanian weightlifter

Andrei Guțu (born 16 September 1980) is a Moldovan-Romanian weightlifter. His personal best is 318 kg.

At the 2005 World Championships he ranked 14th in the 77 kg category, totaling 310 kg.

He competed in Weightlifting at the 2008 Summer Olympics in the 77 kg division, finishing twentieth with 305 kg.

He is 5 ft 7 inches tall and weighs 154 lb.

He also competed in powerlifting at the World Championships, winning several medals.
