= Uati Maposua =

Samoan weightlifter

Personal information
- Nationality: Samoa
- Born: 26 July 1976 (age 49) Apia, Samoa
- Height: 1.78 m (5 ft 10 in)
- Weight: 77 kg (170 lb)

Sport
- Sport: Weightlifting
- Event: 77 kg

Uati Maposua (born 26 July 1976 in Apia) is a Samoan weightlifter. Maposua qualified for the Samoan squad in the men's middleweight class (77 kg) at the 2004 Summer Olympics in Athens by receiving a continental berth from the Oceanian Weightlifting Championships, and was later appointed as the Samoan flag bearer by the National Olympic Committee in the opening ceremony. He successfully lifted 125 kg in the single-motion snatch, and hoisted 155 kg in the two-part, shoulder-to-overhead clean and jerk to deliver a twenty-first-place finish in a field of twenty-five weightlifters with a total of 280 kg. Maposua's official results were later upgraded to twentieth position when Russian weightlifter Oleg Perepetchenov has been stripped off his bronze medal by the International Olympic Committee, after he was tested positive for anabolic steroids.
