= Ferenc Gyurkovics =

Hungarian weightlifter

Personal information
- Born: September 3, 1979 (age 47) Pécs, Baranya, Hungary
Medal record
Men's Weightlifting
Representing Hungary
Olympic Games
Silver medal – second place	Disqualified 2004 Athens	105 kg

Ferenc Gyurkovics is a Hungarian weightlifter who competed for Hungary. He won the silver medal in Weightlifting at the 2004 Summer Olympics – Men's 105 kg but was disqualified after he tested positive for stanazolol after a dope test.
