= Li Hongli =

Chinese weightlifter (born 1980)

Personal information
- Born: 1980-12-26
Medal record
Men's Weightlifting
Representing China
Olympic Games
Silver medal – second place	2008 Beijing	– 77 kg
World Championships
Gold medal – first place	2005 Doha	– 77 kg
Silver medal – second place	2006 Santo Domingo	– 77 kg
Bronze medal – third place	2003 Vancouver	– 77 kg
Bronze medal – third place	2007 Chiang Mai	– 77 kg

Li Hongli (Chinese: 李宏利; pinyin: Lǐ Hónglì; born 26 December 1980 in Ningyuan, Yongzhou, Hunan, China) is a Chinese weightlifter. He is 168 cm tall.

At the 2003 World Weightlifting Championships, Li Hongli won the bronze medal in the 77 kg category, with a total of 352.5 kg, after Gevorg Davtyan was tested positive for banned substances and lost his silver medal.

Li competed in the men's 77 kg class at the 2005 World Weightlifting Championships and won the gold medal. He snatched 165 kg and clean and jerked 196 kg for a total of 361 kg.

Li participated in the 77 kg category at the 2006 World Weightlifting Championships and won the silver medal, finishing behind Taner Sagir. He snatched 167 kg and clean and jerked an additional 192 kg for a total of 359 kg.

At the 2007 World Weightlifting Championships he won the bronze medal in the 77 kg category, with a total of 361 kg.

He won the silver medal in the 77 kg category at the 2008 Summer Olympics, with a total of 366 kg.
