= Dmitry Berestov =

Russian weightlifter (born 1980)

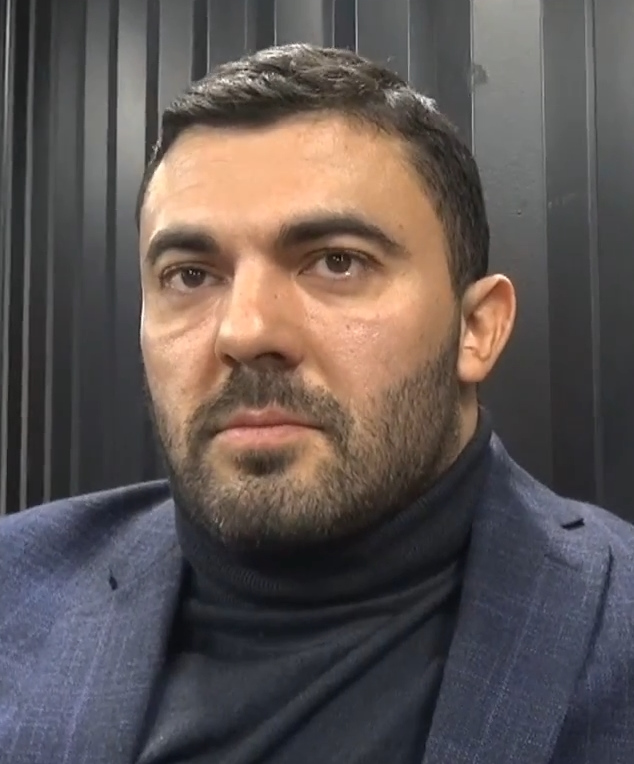

Medal record

Representing Russia

Men's weightlifting

Olympic Games
Gold medal – first place	2004 Athens	-105 kg

European Championships
Silver medal – second place	2004 Kyiv	-105 kg
Gold medal – first place	2008 Lignano Sabbiadoro	-105 kg

Dmitry Vladimirovitch Berestov (Russian: Дмитрий Владимирович Берестов; born 13 June 1980 in Moscow) is a Russian weightlifter who won the gold medal in the 105 kg class at the 2004 Summer Olympics. He is 186 cm/6 ft 1 tall and weighs 105 kg/231 lb.

In July 2006, Berestov failed a drugs test and faced a two-year competition ban. In 2008 the suspension ended and Berestov returned to the 2008 European Weightlifting Championships, where he won the gold medal in the overall.
