= Taner Sağır =

Turkish weightlifter (born 1985)

Personal information
- Nationality: Turkish
- Born: 13 March 1985 (age 41) Kardzhali, Bulgaria
- Height: 1.70 m (5 ft 7 in)

Sport
- Country: Turkey
- Sport: Weightlifting
- Event: –77 kg
- Club: Demirspor Club, Ankara
- Coached by: Muharrem Süleymanoğlu and Osman Nuri Vural
Medal record
Olympic Games
Gold medal – first place	2004 Athens	–77 kg
World Championships
Gold medal – first place	2006 Santo Domingo	–77 kg
European Championships
Gold medal – first place	2004 Kyiv	–77 kg
Gold medal – first place	2005 Sofia	–77 kg
Bronze medal – third place	2007 Strasbourg	–77 kg

Taner Sağır (born 13 March 1985 in Kardzhali, Bulgaria) is a Turkish world and Olympic weightlifting champion. Coming into Athens as holder of all the junior world records at the age of only 19, he broke the Olympic records in the category –77 kg snatch, clean and jerk and total.

== Early years ==
He was born in Bulgaria to parents of Turkish ethnicity. In 1989, the family emigrated to Turkey where they settled first in the Batıkent neighborhood of Yenimahalle, Ankara before later moving to Pursaklar, Ankara. In 1994, Taner began weightlifting in Pursaklar. Taner Sağır is the younger brother of Olympic weightlifter Nezir Sağır.

== Sports career ==
Sağır, 1.70 m tall, is a student of physical education and sports. Muharrem Süleymanoğlu and Osman Nuri Vural coach him at the Demirspor Club in Ankara, Turkey.

As he is somewhat baby-faced, he was in a few commercials at the Athens Olympics in 2004.

He did not finish after three failures in the snatch event at the 2008 Summer Olympics.

He has not competed in a major event since 2008, owing to a spinal disc injury.

== Family life ==
On 30 August 2008 he married Sibel Güler, a two-time European taekwondo champion and a fellow immigrant from Bulgaria. The couple has a child. The family resides in Ankara on a street named after him.

== Medals ==
Olympics

Rank	Discipline	Snatch	Clean and jerk	Total	Place	Date
Gold	–77 kg	172.5	202.5	375.0	Athens, GRE	19 August 2004

World Championships

Rank	Discipline	Snatch	Clean and jerk	Total	Place	Date
Gold	–77 kg	166.0	195.0	361.0	Santo Domingo, DOM	3 October 2006
Gold	J –77 kg	160.0	195.5 JWR	355.0 JWR	Hermosillo, MEX	1 June 2003

European Championships

Rank	Discipline	Snatch	Clean and jerk	Total	Place	Date
Gold	–77 kg	167.5	192.5	360.0	Sofia, BUL	22 April 2005
Gold	–77 kg	167.5	200.0	367.5	Kyiv, UKR	20 April 2004
Gold	J –69 kg	147.5	175.0	322.5	Havířov, CZE	29 May 2002
Gold	Y –69 kg				Stavanger, NOR	30 July 2001
Silver	Y –59 kg				Košice, SVK	24 August 2000

- Y: Youth (under 16)
- J: Junior
- JWR: Junior World record

== World rank ==
2004 World ranking list for the category "Men 77 kg" is as following:

Rank	Discipline	Snatch	Clean and jerk	Total	Place	Date
1	Taner Sağır, TUR	172.5	202.5	375.0	Athens, GRE	19 August 2004
2	Sergey Filimonov, KAZ	172.5	200.0	372.5	Athens, GRE	19 August 2004
3	Oleg Perepetchenov, RUS	170.0	195.0	365.0	Athens, GRE	19 August 2004
