= Sherzodjon Yusupov =

Uzbekistani weightlifter (born 1982)

Sherzodjon Yusupov (born October 10, 1982) is an Uzbekistani weightlifter.

At the 2007 World Weightlifting Championships he ranked 28th in the 77 kg category, with a total of 319 kg.

At the 2008 Asian Championships he ranked 5th in the 77 kg category, with a total of 314 kg. He competed in Weightlifting at the 2008 Summer Olympics in the 77 kg division finishing sixteenth with a total of 322 kg. This beat his previous personal best by 3 kg.

At the 2012 Summer Olympics, he competed in the 85 kg category. He finished in 11th place, with a total of 350 kg.

He is 5 ft 6 inches tall and weighs 172 lb.
