= René Hoch =

German weightlifter

Personal information
- Nationality: German
- Born: 11 April 1978 (age 46); Berlin, Germany

Sport
- Sport: Weightlifting

René Hoch (born 11 April 1978) is a German weightlifter. He competed in the men's middleweight event at the 2004 Summer Olympics.
