= Reyhan Arabacıoğlu =

Turkish weightlifter (born 1982)

Personal information
- Nationality: Turkey
- Born: 22 December 1982 (age 43) Bulgaria
- Height: 1.70 m (5 ft 7 in)
- Weight: 77 kg (170 lb)

Sport
- Sport: Weightlifting
- Weight class: 77 kg
- Club: İzmir Büyükşehir Belediyespor
Medal record
Men’s weightlifting
Representing Turkey
Olympic Games
Bronze medal – third place	2004 Athens	77 kg
World Championships
Silver medal – second place	2003 Vancouver	77 kg
Bronze medal – third place	2001 Antalya	69 kg
European Championships
Silver medal – second place	2003 Loutraki	77 kg
Bronze medal – third place	2002 Antalya	69 kg
Mediterranean Games
Silver medal – second place	2001 Tunis	69 kg C
Silver medal – second place	2005 Almeria	77 kg C

Reyhan Arabacıoğlu (born 22 December 1982 in İzmir, Turkey) is a Turkish weightlifter who competed in the –77 kg and –69 kg divisions. He is an Olympic bronze medalist and a two-time World Championships medalist.

== Career ==
Arabacıoğlu began weightlifting in İzmir and represented İzmir Büyükşehir Belediyespor during his professional career.

He won his first international medal at the 2001 World Weightlifting Championships in Antalya, where he earned bronze in the 69 kg category. Two years later, he captured the silver medal at the 2003 World Weightlifting Championships in Vancouver in the 77 kg division. At the 2004 Summer Olympics in Athens, Arabacıoğlu initially placed fourth in the men’s 77 kg event with a 360 kg total (165 kg snatch, 195 kg clean and jerk). However, in 2013 the International Olympic Committee disqualified Russia’s Oleg Perepechenov after reanalysis of stored doping samples, and Arabacıoğlu was retroactively awarded the Olympic bronze medal.

He also earned medals at the European Weightlifting Championships, including silver in 2003 (Loutraki, –77 kg) and bronze in 2002 (Antalya, –69 kg). In 2005, he represented Turkey at the Mediterranean Games in Almería, Spain, winning silver in the 77 kg division.

== Major results ==
Year	Venue	Weight	Snatch (kg)				Clean & Jerk (kg)				Total	Rank
Year	Venue	Weight	1	2	3	Rank	1	2	3	Rank	Total	Rank
Olympic Games
2004	Athens, Greece	77 kg	160	165	~~170~~	4	190	195	~~200~~	3	360	3rd place, bronze medalist(s)
World Weightlifting Championships
2001	Antalya, Turkey	69 kg	150	152.5	~~155~~	3	180	182.5	~~185~~	3	335	3rd place, bronze medalist(s)
2003	Vancouver, Canada	77 kg	160	165	—	3	190	195	~~200~~	2	355	2nd place, silver medalist(s)
European Weightlifting Championships
2002	Antalya, Turkey	69 kg	145	150	—	3	175	180	—	3	330	3rd place, bronze medalist(s)
2003	Loutraki, Greece	77 kg	160	165	—	2	195	200	—	2	365	2nd place, silver medalist(s)
2001	Trenčín, Slovakia	69 kg	147.5	150	—	1	170	175	—	1	325	1st place, gold medalist(s)
2000	Rijeka, Croatia	69 kg	140	142.5	—	1	175	177.5	—	1	320	1st place, gold medalist(s)
1999	Spała, Poland	62 kg	125	127.5	—	2	145	150	—	2	277.5	2nd place, silver medalist(s)
Mediterranean Games
2005	Almería, Spain	77 kg	155	160	—	2nd place, silver medalist(s)	195	200	—	2nd place, silver medalist(s)	360	2nd place, silver medalist(s)
