= Gleb Pisarevskiy =

Russian weightlifter (born 1976)

Personal information
- Full name: Gleb Olegovich Pisarevskiy
- Born: 28 June 1976 (age 49) Arkhangelsk, Russian SFSR, Soviet Union
- Height: 1.82 m (6 ft 0 in)
- Weight: 105 kg (231 lb)
Medal record
Men's weightlifting
Olympic Games
Bronze medal – third place	2004 Athens	– 105 kg
European Championships
Silver medal – second place	2007 Strasbourg	– 105 kg

Gleb Olegovich Pisarevskiy (Russian: Глеб Олегович Писаревский; born 28 June 1976 in Arkhangelsk) is a Russian weightlifter and an honored Master of Sports who won the bronze medal in the 105 kg class at the 2004 Summer Olympics with a 190 kg snatch and a 225 kg clean and jerk. Pisarevskiy is widely regarded as one of the greatest weightlifting technicians of all time.

Despite limited success on the international stage, Pisarevskiy was renowned as an outstanding lifter in training. Alongside his Olympic bronze medal in 2004, Pisarevskiy is notable for his 255 kg clean during preparations for the Olympics, which remains the heaviest recorded clean by any non super-heavyweight lifter in the modern era, only being beaten by the 260 kg clean made by Stefan Botev done in preparation for the 1988 Summer Olympics. Additionally, he is among the heavyweight lifters with the highest number of documented snatches over 200 kg.
