= Gevorg Davtyan =

Armenian weightlifter (born 1983)

Medal record

Men's Weightlifting

Representing Armenia

Olympic Games
Bronze medal – third place	2008 Beijing	77 kg

World Championships
Silver medal – second place	2007 Chiang Mai	77 kg

European Championships
Gold medal – first place	2006 Władysławowo	77 kg
Gold medal – first place	2007 Strasbourg	77 kg

Gevorg Davtyan (Armenian: Գևորգ Դավթյան, born January 4, 1983, in Leninakan, Armenian SSR) is an Armenian weightlifter. Davtyan received the Master of Sport of Armenia, International Class title in 2001, Best Sportsman of Armenia award in 2007, and Honored Master of Sport of Armenia title in 2009. He is 165 cm tall.

== Biography ==
Gevorg Davtyan started weightlifting in 1994 under the honored coach of Armenia, Vahan Bichakhchyan. Four years later, he won the Junior European Championship. Davtyan repeated this success a year later. He also won a gold medal at the 2001 Junior World Championship. After that, Davtyan began to compete in adult competitions.

Davtyan became a consecutive two-time European Champion at the 2006 European Weightlifting Championships and 2007 European Weightlifting Championships. He won the gold medal in the 77 kg category.

He won the silver medal in the 77 kg category at the 2007 World Weightlifting Championships.

Davtyan became an Olympic bronze medalist in the 77 kg category at the 2008 Summer Olympics with a total of 360 kg. At a press conference afterward for the division medalists, Davtyan announced "I want to offer my medal to Anatoly Khrapaty's memory who died some day ago. The Olympic champion was one of my former coaches."

Following an unsuccessful proformence at the 2010 World Weightlifting Championships, Davtyan left the Armenian national weightlifting team.
