= Krzysztof Szramiak =

Polish weightlifter

Krzysztof Szramiak (born 9 July 1984 in Opole) is a Polish weightlifter.

He competed in Weightlifting at the 2008 Summer Olympics in the 77 kg division finishing eighth with 352 kg. This beat his previous personal best by 2 kg.

He is 167 centimetres (5 ft 6 in) tall and weighs approx. 78 kilograms (172 lb) off-season (during training, outside competition).
