= Weightlifting at the 2004 Summer Olympics =

Weightlifting at the Games of the XXVIII Olympiad
- Venue: Nikaia Olympic Weightlifting Hall
- Dates: 14–25 August 2004
- No. of events: 15
- Competitors: 249 from 79 nations

At the 2004 Summer Olympics in Athens, fifteen events in weightlifting were contested, in eight classes for men and seven for women. Competition was held in the Nikaia Olympic Weightlifting Hall.

== Medalists ==
=== Men ===
Event	Gold	Silver	Bronze
56 kg	Halil Mutlu; Turkey	Wu Meijin; China	Sedat Artuç; Turkey
62 kg	Shi Zhiyong; China	Le Maosheng; China	Israel José Rubio; Venezuela
69 kg	Zhang Guozheng; China	Lee Bae-young; South Korea	Nikolaj Pešalov; Croatia
77 kg	Taner Sağır; Turkey	Sergey Filimonov; Kazakhstan	Reyhan Arabacıoğlu; Turkey
85 kg	Giorgi Asanidze; Georgia	Andrei Rybakou; Belarus	Pyrros Dimas; Greece
94 kg	Milen Dobrev; Bulgaria	Khadzhimurat Akkaev; Russia	Eduard Tyukin; Russia
105 kg	Dmitry Berestov; Russia	Ihor Razoronov; Ukraine	Gleb Pisarevskiy; Russia
+105 kg	Hossein Rezazadeh; Iran	Viktors Ščerbatihs; Latvia	Velichko Cholakov; Bulgaria

=== Women ===
Event	Gold	Silver	Bronze
48 kg	Nurcan Taylan; Turkey	Li Zhuo; China	Aree Wiratthaworn; Thailand
53 kg	Udomporn Polsak; Thailand	Raema Lisa Rumbewas; Indonesia	Mabel Mosquera; Colombia
58 kg	Chen Yanqing; China	Ri Song-hui; North Korea	Wandee Kameaim; Thailand
63 kg	Nataliya Skakun; Ukraine	Hanna Batsiushka; Belarus	Tatsiana Stukalava; Belarus
69 kg	Liu Chunhong; China	Eszter Krutzler; Hungary	Zarema Kasaeva; Russia
75 kg	Pawina Thongsuk; Thailand	Natalya Zabolotnaya; Russia	Valentina Popova; Russia
+75 kg	Tang Gonghong; China	Jang Mi-ran; South Korea	Agata Wróbel; Poland

== Medal table ==
Rank	Nation	Gold	Silver	Bronze	Total
1	China	5	3	0	8
2	Turkey	3	0	2	5
3	Thailand	2	0	2	4
4	Russia	1	2	4	7
5	Ukraine	1	1	0	2
6	Bulgaria	1	0	1	2
7	Georgia	1	0	0	1
7	Iran	1	0	0	1
9	Belarus	0	2	1	3
10	South Korea	0	2	0	2
11	Hungary	0	1	0	1
11	Indonesia	0	1	0	1
11	Kazakhstan	0	1	0	1
11	Latvia	0	1	0	1
11	North Korea	0	1	0	1
16	Colombia	0	0	1	1
16	Croatia	0	0	1	1
16	Greece	0	0	1	1
16	Poland	0	0	1	1
16	Venezuela	0	0	1	1
Totals (20 entries)		15	15	15	45

== Participating nations ==
A total of 249 weightlifters from 79 nations competed at the Athens Games:

- Albania (2)
- Algeria (2)
- American Samoa (1)
- Argentina (2)
- Armenia (4)
- Aruba (1)
- Australia (2)
- Austria (1)
- Azerbaijan (5)
- Belarus (8)
- Bulgaria (9)
- Cameroon (2)
- Canada (2)
- China (10)
- Chinese Taipei (8)
- Colombia (9)
- Comoros (1)
- Cook Islands (1)
- Croatia (1)
- Cuba (2)
- Czech Republic (1)
- Dominican Republic (1)
- Ecuador (2)
- Egypt (5)
- El Salvador (1)
- Federated States of Micronesia (1)
- Fiji (1)
- France (5)
- Georgia (2)
- Germany (4)
- Great Britain (2)
- Greece (10)
- Guatemala (1)
- Guyana (1)
- Hungary (7)
- India (3)
- Indonesia (6)
- Iran (6)
- Iraq (1)
- Japan (4)
- Kazakhstan (3)
- Kiribati (1)
- Kyrgyzstan (1)
- Latvia (1)
- Libya (2)
- Lithuania (1)
- Malaysia (1)
- Mauritius (1)
- Mexico (1)
- Moldova (3)
- Mongolia (1)
- Morocco (1)
- Myanmar (1)
- Nauru (3)
- Nigeria (2)
- North Korea (4)
- Norway (1)
- Papua New Guinea (1)
- Peru (1)
- Poland (7)
- Qatar (2)
- Romania (7)
- Russia (9)
- Samoa (1)
- Saudi Arabia (4)
- Seychelles (1)
- Slovakia (3)
- South Korea (7)
- Spain (2)
- Thailand (5)
- Tunisia (2)
- Turkey (9)
- Turkmenistan (1)
- Uganda (1)
- Ukraine (9)
- United States (5)
- Uzbekistan (3)
- Venezuela (3)
- Vietnam (1)

== Doping ==
A total of twelve weightlifters were disqualified for doping, amongst them Greek star Leonidas Sabanis, who had won two silver medals in previous Olympics and who had originally been awarded the bronze medal in the Men's 62 kg division.
