= Nader Sufyan Abbas =

Qatari weightlifter (born 1975)

Personal information
- Born: Andrey Ivanov; 12 December 1975 (age 50)
Medal record
Men's Weightlifting
Representing Qatar
World Championships
Gold medal – first place	2001 Antalya	-77 kg

Nader Sufyan Abbas (born Andrey Ivanov (Bulgarian: Андрей Иванов) on 12 December 1975) is a Qatari weightlifter who competed in the Men's 77 kg (170 lb) weight class at the 2004 Summer Olympics and finished 9th. He is the 2001 world champion.

One of eight Bulgarian weightlifters recruited by the Qatar Olympic Committee for $1,000,000, Abbas became a Qatari citizen to represent the country in the 2000 Olympics. His old name, Andrei Ivanov, was left behind in the process. Qatar has been known for recruiting sportspeople from other countries, the most notable examples being fellow weightlifter Said Saif Asaad (formerly Angel Popov of Bulgaria) and world-class runner Saif Saaeed Shaheen.

During the 2000 Summer Olympics, he dropped out shortly before the competition, citing a virus infection.
