= Sergey Filimonov =

Kazakhstani weightlifter (born 1975)

Personal information
- Born: February 2, 1975 (age 51) Ushtobe, Kazakh SSR, Soviet Union
- Height: 1.78 m (5 ft 10 in)

Sport
- Country: Russia; Kazakhstan
- Sport: Weightlifting
Medal record
Men's Weightlifting
Olympic Games
Silver medal – second place	2004 Athens	– 77 kg
Asian Games Total
Gold medal – first place	2002 Busan	– 77 kg
Bronze medal – third place	1998 Bangkok	– 77 kg
Representing Russia
European Championships Total
Silver medal – second place	1996 Stavanger	– 76 kg

Sergey Yuryevich Filimonov (born February 2, 1975) is a Kazakhstani weightlifter who competed in the Men's 77 kg at the 2004 Summer Olympics and won the silver medal with 372.5 kg in total.

He has been a scholarship holder with the Olympic Solidarity program since November 2002. Filimonov represented Russia at the 1996 Summer Olympics in Atlanta, Georgia.
