= Oleg Perepetchenov =

Russian weightlifter (born 1975)

Personal information
- Native name: Олег Александрович Перепечёнов
- Full name: Oleg Aleksandrovich Perepetchenov
- Nationality: Russian
- Born: September 6, 1975 (age 50) Tashkent, Uzbek SSR, Soviet Union
- Height: 1.65 m (5 ft 5 in)
- Weight: 77 kg (170 lb)

Sport
- Country: Russia
- Sport: Olympic weightlifting
- Event: –77 kg
- Club: CSKA Moskva
Medal record
Men's Weightlifting
Olympic Games
Disqualified	2004 Athens	-77 kg
World Championships
Silver medal – second place	2001 Antalya	-77 kg
Silver medal – second place	2002 Warsaw	-77 kg
European Championships
Gold medal – first place	2001 Trencin	-77 kg
Gold medal – first place	2008 Lignano Sabbiadoro	-77 kg
- Updated on 12 February 2013

Oleg Perepetchenov (born September 6, 1975) is a Russian powerlifter and former weightlifter.

In the 2001 and 2002 World Weightlifting Championships, Perepetchenov won the silver medal in the Men's 77 kg weight category. Perepetchenov competed in the Men's 77 kg at the 2004 Summer Olympics and won the bronze medal, lifting 365.0 kg in total. At the 2001 and 2008 at the European Weightlifting Championships he won gold in the Men's 77 kg. He was world champion in the 77 kg in clean and jerk at the 2006 World Weightlifting Championships. At the 2008 Summer Olympics he ranked 5th in the 77 kg category, with a total of 354 kg.

On February 12, 2013 the International Olympic Committee stripped Perepetchenov of his 2004 Olympic medal after both probes were retested and showed traces of anabolic steroids.

== Career bests ==
=== Weightlifting ===
- Snatch: 175 kg in the class to 85 kg
- Clean and jerk: 210 kg in the class to 77 kg
- Total: 380 kg (175+205) 2005 World Championship in the class to 85 kg

=== Powerlifting ===
- Squat: 320 kg in the class to 98 kg
- Bench Press: 290 kg in the class to 100 kg
- Deadlift: 290 kg in the class to 98 kg
- Total: 800 kg in the class to 98 kg
