= Chicago Jazz (synchronized skating team) =

American junior team, 1987–2019

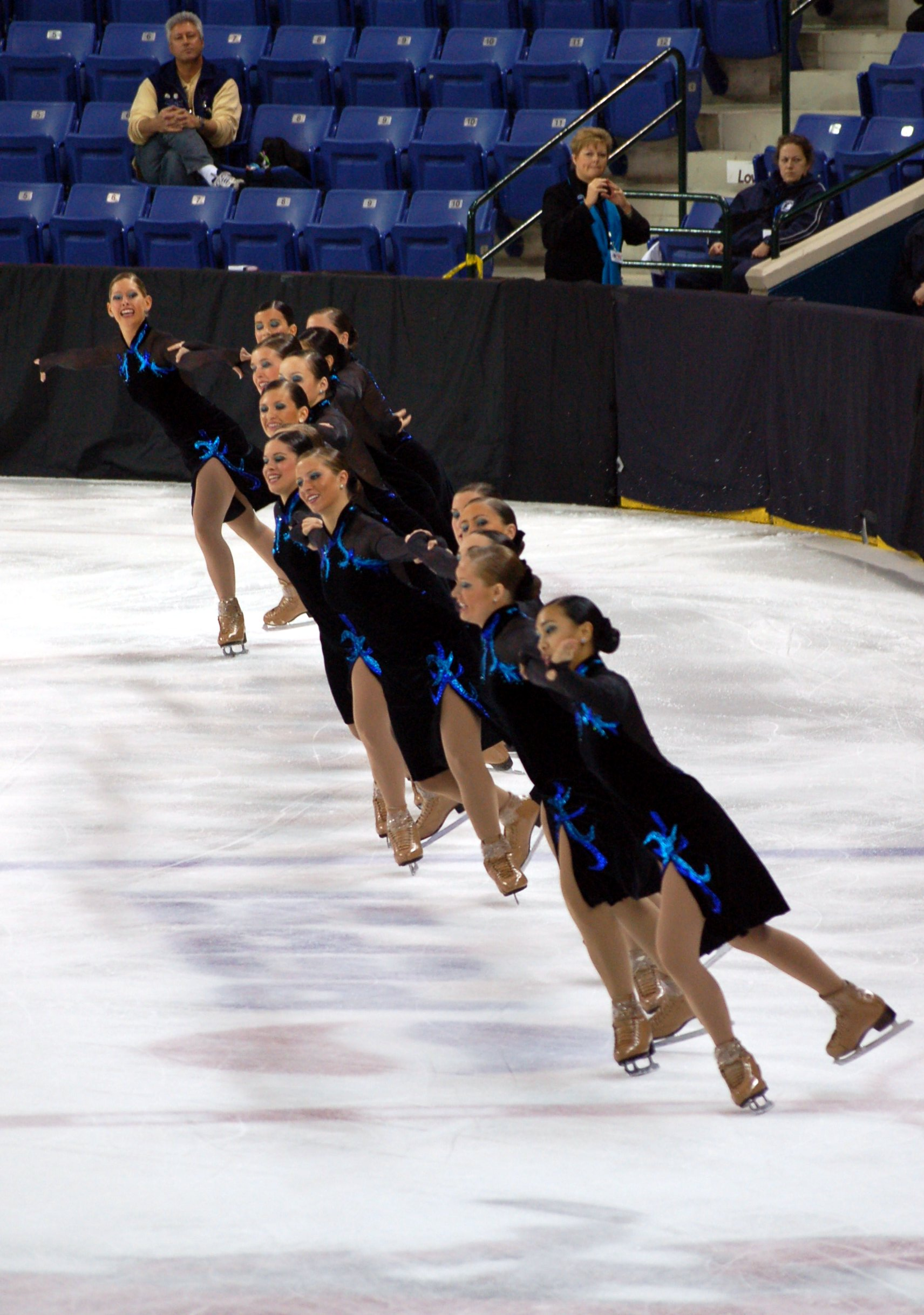
- Chicago Jazz in 2007

Team information
- Country represented: United States
- Formed: 1987
- Retired: 2019
- Home town: Rolling Meadows, Illinois, United States
- Skating club: Chicago FSC
- Level: Junior, Novice
- World standing: 20 (2018–19); 19 (2017–18); 14 (2016–17); 13 (2015–16); 19 (2014–15); 10 (2013–14); 23 (2012–13); 12 (2011–12)

ISU team best scores
- Combined total: 155.42; 2016 Spring Cup
- Short program: 56.60; 2016 Spring Cup
- Free skate: 98.82; 2016 Spring Cup

Chicago Jazz was a synchronized skating team from Rolling Meadows, Illinois, a northwest suburb of Chicago.

The Chicago Jazz began in 1987, as the Jazz Babies under the direction of Coach Lisa Darken. With a team of 22 skaters, the Jazz Babies began their climb in 1991 and became the U.S. Figure Skating Bronze Medalists in the Intermediate Division at the U.S. National Precision Skating Championships held in Anchorage, Alaska. The team continued to grow and in 1994 earned entry for all four divisions with a total of 80 skaters in the U.S. Figure Skating National Precision Team Championships in Providence, Rhode Island. Every year from 1994 to 2019, the Chicago Jazz was represented in the U.S. National Championships.

In 1996, the Jazz Babies merged their precision skating program with the Rolling Meadows Rockettes Precision Ice Skating Club. This new family of over 160 Skaters, representing eight divisions, became known as the Chicago Jazz Precision Ice Skating Club. Utilizing skating facilities in Rolling Meadows, Park Ridge, Buffalo Grove, and Glenview, Chicago Jazz represented the Chicago area both nationally and internationally.

In 2006, Head coach Lisa Darken was awarded the PSA Synchronized Skating Coach of the year award.

== Notable achievements ==
Chicago jazz were six-time Junior U.S. national champions, three-time Junior U.S. national silver-medalists, three-time Novice U.S. national champions, five-time Juvenile U.S. national champions, and earned a third-place finish at the junior world challenge cup during the 2006–07 season.

=== Skater achievements ===
Several Chicago Jazz skaters have been nominated to the USFSA Scholastic Honors Team, which recognizes high school-age U.S. Figure Skating members who have distinguished themselves in figure skating, academics, and community involvement.

- 2002 Kara Dollaske, Awardee
- 2002 Charity Witlock, runner up
- 2010 Alexa Kommich, Awardee
- 2012 Jordan Barone, Awardee
- 2013 Jacquelyn Cruz, Awardee

== Competitive highlights ==
The Chicago Jazz representative teams competed Internationally as members of Team USA starting in 1998, continuing through the 2018–19 season

=== 2007-08 to 2018-19 seasons ===
International
Event	07-08	08-09	09-10	10-11	11-12	12-13	13-14	14-15	15-16	16-17	17-18	18-19
Jr World Challenge Cup	4th	6th					10th					
Cup of Berlin				4th				6th				
Neuchâtel Trophy					1st				1st			
Mozart Cup										4th		
Leon Lurje Trophy											5th	
Trophy D’Ecosse											1st	
French Cup		3rd	5th				10th			5th		
Spring Cup	1st					8th			1st			4th
National: Junior
U.S. Champs	1st	2nd	4th	4th	4th	4th	4th	4th	1st	4th	4th	8th
National: Novice
U.S. Champs	3rd	6th		5th		2nd	7th	6th	4th			

=== 1998-99 to 2006-07 seasons ===
International
Event	98-99	99-00	00-01	01-02	02-03	03-04	04-05	05-06
Jr World Challenge Cup					6th	9th	8th	3rd
Neuchâtel Trophy			3rd					
Czech Open								2nd
French Cup							2nd	
Spring Cup						2nd		
International: Novice
Czech Open								1st
French Cup	1st			1st			2nd	
Spring Cup						1st		
National: Junior
U.S. Champs	4th	3rd	1st	1st	1st	2nd	2nd	1st
National: Novice
U.S. Champs	4th	3rd	2nd	5th	3rd	1st	1st	1st
