= Helsingfors Skridskoklubb =

Logo

Helsingfors Skridskoklubb (Swedish; commonly abbreviated to HSK), also known as Helsingin Luistinklubi in Finnish, is the oldest figure skating club in Finland. It was founded in Helsinki in 1875.

== HSK in figure skating ==
HSK trains athletes and non-professionals in three figure skating disciplines: single skating, ice dance and synchronized skating. Nadja Franck was an early member. The club's most successful skaters include the ice dance pair Susanna Rahkamo/Petri Kokko, who are the 1995 European champions and 1995 World silver medalists. HSK has synchronized skating teams at all competitive levels: Team Unique at the senior, Team Mystique at the junior, Team Dynamique at the novice and Team Sympatique at the intermediate level. The club trains beginners' teams and teams in the open leagues as well.

=== Team Unique ===
The senior team Team Unique are the 2013 World and Finnish Champions.

=== Team Mystique ===
The junior team Team Mystique are the 2004 and 2005 silver medalists at the Junior World Challenge Cup.

=== Team Dynamique ===
The novice team Team Dynamique are the 2014 and 2016 Finnish Champions.

==== Competitive results (2002–12) ====
National
Event	2002–03	2003–04	2004–05	2005–06	2006–07	2007–08	2008–09	2009–10	2010–11	2011–12
1st Finnish Championships; Qualifier	(no Finnish championships for novices)							2nd (division II)	3rd (division I)	3rd (division I)
2nd Finnish Championships; Qualifier	(no Finnish championships for novices)							1st (division II)	1st (division I)	1st (division I)
Finnish Championships	(no Finnish championships for novices)							5th	3rd	2nd
International
Event	2002–03	2003–04	2004–05	2005–06	2006–07	2007–08	2008–09	2009–10	2010–11	2011–12
Finlandia Cup						4th		2nd		
French Cup	5th	4th		2nd	1st			3rd	1st	2nd
Leon Lurje Trophy					8th	5th	4th			
Swiss Trophy			1st							

==== Competitive results (2012–14) ====
National
Event	2012–13	2013–14
1st Finnish Championships; Qualifier	2nd (division II)	1st (division II)
2nd Finnish Championships; Qualifier	2nd (division II)	1st (division II)
Finnish Championships	2nd	1st
International
Event	2012–13	2013–14
French Cup	1st	1st

=== 2020 suspension of synchronized skating coach ===
In January 2020, the Finnish Figure Skating Association (FFSA) imposed a one-year competition ban on the club's synchronized skating head coach Mirjami Penttinen, for unethical conduct. 12 former junior and senior skaters under Penttinen's coaching had contacted the Finnish Center for Integrity in Sports (FINCIS, in Finnish: Suomen urheilun eettinen keskus, SUEK) and told about their experiences.

The FINCIS had conducted an investigation and handed its findings over to the FFSA, whose Disciplinary Board found that Penttinen had repeatedly violated ethical rules of sports by using abusive language, yelling and humiliating her coachees, and on several occasions, suggesting that some of her coachees making mistakes during practice should commit suicide. The HSK temporarily suspended Penttinen due to the competition ban. Penttinen's lawyer denied the accusations and told that Penttinen was "extremely upset, sad, and sorry for the situation."

In June 2020 the City of Helsinki decided to reclaim the 2018 subsidies from HSK, totaling approximately €57,000, due to what the City described as "not having abided by good governance and 'fair play' principles." Nasima Razmyar, then-Vice Mayor of Helsinki and then-chair of the Culture and Leisure Committee of the City, deemed the decision as an important precedent demonstrating a "zero tolerance for bullying and humiliation", further adding that "the City has to stick to its principles" when granting subsidies.

== HSK in ice hockey ==
HSK had a successful ice hockey team during the 1930s which won the SM-sarja twice (1933 & 1934). The Ice hockey team ceased to exist in early 1950s.
