= Team Mystique =

Finnish junior level synchronized skating team

Team information
- Country represented: Finland
- Home town: Helsinki, Finland
- Coach: Mirjami Penttinen
- Skating club: Helsingfors Skridskoklubb
- Level: Junior
- World standing: 15

ISU team best scores
- Combined total: 182.04; 2010 Finlandia Cup
- Short program: 72.57; 2010 Finlandia Cup
- Free skate: 110.03; 2014 French Cup

Team Mystique are a junior-level synchronized skating team from Helsinki, Finland, representing the figure skating club Helsingfors Skridskoklubb. The club is also home to the senior team, Team Unique. They have placed second twice at the Junior World Challenge Cup.

== Competitive results (1998–2008) ==
National
Event	1998–99	1999–00	2000–01	2001–02	2002–03	2003–04	2004–05	2005–06	2006–07	2007–08
1st Finnish Championships; Qualifier				2nd		2nd	2nd	3rd	5th	4th
2nd Finnish Championships; Qualifier					2nd		2nd	3rd	5th	4th
Finnish Championships	7th	6th	3rd	4th	3rd	2nd	3rd	4th	4th	3rd
International
Event	1998–99	1999–00	2000–01	2001–02	2002–03	2003–04	2004–05	2005–06	2006–07	2007–08
Junior World Challenge Cup	DNQ	DNQ	DNQ	DNQ	4th	2nd	2nd	DNQ	DNQ	DNQ
Cup of Berlin							2nd	4th		
Finlandia Cup				5th		3rd				4th
French Cup	1st						1st			1st
North American International; Synchronized Skating Competition					4th					
Prague Cup						2nd				
Spring Cup									1st	
DNQ = did not qualify

== Competitive results (2008–14) ==
National
Event	2008–09	2009–10	2010–11	2011–12	2012–13	2013–14	2014–15
1st Finnish Championships; Qualifier	3rd	3rd	3rd	3rd	3rd	4th	5th
2nd Finnish Championships; Qualifier	3rd	1st	3rd	4th	3rd	3rd	5th
Finnish Championships	3rd	2nd	3rd	3rd	3rd	3rd	
International
Event	2008–09	2009–10	2010–11	2011–12	2012–13	2013–14	2014–15
Cup of Berlin		1st	3rd				2nd
Finlandia Cup		3rd					
French Cup	1st			3rd	2nd	2nd	
