= Team Berlin 1 =

German synchronised skating team

- Team Berlin 1 performing at the 2026 German Championships

Team information
- Country represented: Germany
- Formed: 1994
- Coach: Gert Hofmann, Marco Derpa
- Skating club: BTSC - Berlin
- Level: Senior
- Training locations: Berlin
- World standing: 6th

ISU team best scores
- Combined total: 197.60; 2026 Worlds
- Short program: 68.68; 2026 Worlds
- Free skate: 131.25; 2024 Worlds

Team Berlin 1 is a senior-level synchronized skating team from Germany.

Established in 1994 in Berlin, Team Berlin 1 started competing internationally in 2004. They are 18-time world championships competitors. They have earned 30 German championship titles.

They have earned a challenger series medal (2025) and numerous other international medals over their competitive history.

Some members of the team have participated in German television show Dancing on Ice.

== Programs ==
Competition programs by season
Season	Short program	Free skate program
2022-23	"The Garador's Flight": by Jo Brandenburg; "Angels and Demons": by Wildmax	"The Power Of Mind" "Remember Me": by Anne Sophie Versnaeyen, Gabriel Saban, Phillip Briand; "Don't Speak (feat. Tim Halperin)": by Gwen, Stefani Renee, Tim Halperin
2023-24	"Pure, Honey": by Beyonce; "Break My Soul (The Queens Remix)": by Beyonce and Madonna; "Nails, Hair, Hips, Heels (Just Dance Version)": by Todrick Hall	"Time": by FreshmanSound; "Whats Happening to Me": by Two Steps from Hell
2024-25	The Code: by Felix Jaehn	Tango: by Gabriel Saban
2025-26	Dance of Fire "A Mike and Mirror" "Growing Pressure" "A Strong Volitation": by Gabrial Saban	The Chase "Golden Cage" "For Her Majesty" "Hard Training": by Gabrial Saban

== Competitive highlights ==
Team Berlin 1 performing their pair element at the 2026 world championships

Competition placements since the 2019-20 season
Season	2019-20	2020-21	2021-22	2022-23	2023-24	2024-25	2025-26
World Championships	C	C	7th	8th	7th	7th	7th
German Championships	1st	C	1st	1st	1st	1st	1st
Cup of Neuss				1st			
Dresden Cup					1st	5th (CS)	
Hevelius Cup					7th (CS)	3rd	
Leon Lurje Trophy	10th (CS)						
Lumiere Cup					4th (CS)		4th (CS)
Mozart Cup			1st	9th (CS)			
Neuchâtel Trophy			4th				
Santa Claus Cup				1st			
Shanghai Trophy						2nd	
Spring Cup	11th (CS)						
French Cup							3rd (CS)

Competition placements between the 2004-05 and 2018-19 season
Season	2004-05	2005-06	2006-07	2007-08	2008-09	2009-10	2010-11	2011-12	2012-13	2013-14	2014-15	2015-16	2016-17	2017-18	2018-19
World Championships	5th	8th	9th	7th	8th	8th	11th	9th	10th	13th	10th	12th	10th	10th	10th
German Championships													1st		
Budapest Cup														3rd	2nd
Cup of Berlin		2nd		5th		4th	6th		3rd		3rd		4th	2nd	
French Cup							6th					5th			
Mozart Cup										5th	5th				7th
Neuchâtel Trophy										3rd					
Shanghai Trophy													6th		
Spring Cup		1st			1st	2nd		4th	2nd		5th	4th		3rd	
Zagreb Snowflakes								2nd	3rd				2nd		3rd

Competition placements until the 2003-2004 season
Season	1999-2000	2003-2004
World Championships	6th	5th
