= Les Suprêmes (junior synchronized skating team) =

Junior synchronized skating team

Team information
- Country represented: Canada
- Home town: Montréal
- Coach: Marilyn Langlois, Pascal Denis
- Skating club: Club de Patinage Artistique de Saint-Léonard
- Level: Junior
- World standing: 3

ISU team best scores
- Combined total: 205.14; 2024 Junior World Synchronized Skating Championships
- Short program: 74.01; 2024 Junior World Synchronized Skating Championships
- Free skate: 131.13; 2024 Junior World Synchronized Skating Championships

Les Suprêmes (The Supreme Ones) is the junior-level synchronized skating team representing the figure skating club Club de Patinage Artistique de Saint-Léonard (CPA St-Léonard) in Montréal, Quebec, Canada. CPA St-Léonard fields teams, all named Les Suprêmes, at six levels: star 3, juvenile, novice, open, junior and senior.

== Competitive results ==
=== Competitive results (2000–10) ===
National
Event	2000–01	2001–02	2002–03	2003–04	2004–05	2005–06	2006–07	2007–08	2008–09	2009–10
Canadian Championships	N/A	N/A	N/A	N/A	N/A	1st	2nd	2nd	3rd	2nd
Source										
International
Event	2000–01	2001–02	2002–03	2003–04	2004–05	2005–06	2006–07	2007–08	2008–09	2009–10
Junior World Challenge Cup	2nd		3rd				2nd			6th
Source										
Cup of Berlin						1st				
Source										
French Cup		1st		4th			3rd		4th	4th
Source										
North American International; Synchronized Skating Competition			3rd							
Source										
Prague Cup					3rd			5th		
Source										

=== Competitive results (2011–24) ===
National
Event	2011–12	2012–13	2013–14	2014–15	2015–16	2016–17	2017–18	2018–19	2019–20	2020–21	2021–22	2022–23	2023–24
Canadian Championships	2nd	2nd	1st	1st	2nd	1st	1st	1st	2nd	N/A	1st	2nd	1st
Source													
International
Event	2011–12	2012–13	2013–14	2014–15	2015–16	2016–17	2017–18	2018–19	2019–20	2020–21	2021–22	2022–23	2023–24
Junior World Championships (WJSSC) or Junior World Challenge Cup (JWCC)	3rd (JWCC)	5th (WJSSC)	2nd (JWCC)	3rd (WJSSC)	1st (JWCC)	6th (WJSSC)	4th (WJSSC)	6th (WJSSC)	6th (WJSSC)	N/A	5th (WJSSC)	5th (WJSSC)	1st (WJSSC)
Source													
French Cup	4th	7th	8th	3rd	1st								
Source													
