= Finnish Synchronized Skating Championships =

Annual competition

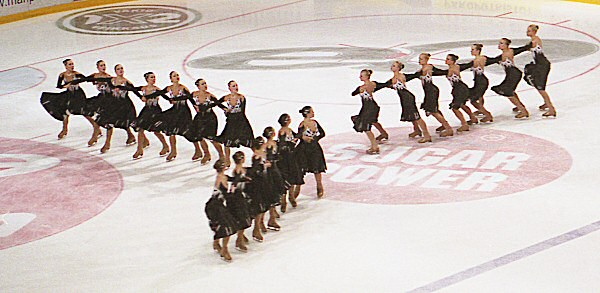
Marigold Ice Unity

The Finnish Synchronized Skating Championships is an annual synchronized skating competition, sanctioned by the Finnish Figure Skating Association, held to determine the national champions of Finland. It was first held in 1991. The teams compete at novice, junior and senior levels.

At the senior level, the teams qualifying for the World Championships (WSSC) have been selected based on their performance at two qualifiers held before the championships and the national championships. For example, in the 2012–13 season, the teams were selected as follows: the Finnish Champion qualified automatically as Team Finland 1 for the WSSC. Team Finland 2 at the WSSC was the team which earned the fewest points from the first qualifier, the second qualifier and the Finnish Championships. The points equaled the sum of the positions at the three competitions with growing coefficients: the coefficient was 0.3 for the first competition result, 0.5 for the second and 1 for the last.

Also the teams for World Junior Championships (and for the Junior World Challenge Cup) are selected based on their performance at the national competitions. For example, in the 2012–13 season, the junior teams were selected as follows: both Team Finland 1 and 2 at the WJSSC were the teams which earned the fewest points from the first qualifier and the second qualifier. The points equaled the sum of the positions at the three competitions with growing coefficients: the coefficient was 0.4 for the first competition result and 0.6 for the second.

== Medalists ==
=== Senior teams ===
Year	Location	Gold	Club	Total	SP	FS	Silver	Club	Total	SP	FS	Gold	Club	Total	SP	FS	Source
1991		Donna di Cello	HTK				Festa Aboensia	TRT				(no other competitors)					
1992		Festa Aboensia	TRT				Thunder	HTK				(no other competitors)					
1993		Rockettes	HTK				Festa Aboensia	TRT				Marigold	HL				
1994		Rockettes	HTK				Festa Aboensia	TRT				Marigold	HL				
1995		Marigold	HL				Rockettes	HTK				Steb by Step	EVT				
1996		Marigold	HL				Rockettes	HTK				Team Unique	HSK				
1997		Marigold	HL				Rockettes	HTK				Steb by Step	EVT				
1998		Rockettes	HTK				Marigold	HL				Steb by Step	EVT				
1999		Rockettes	HTK				Marigold IceUnity	HL				Team Unique	HSK				
Year	Location	Gold	Club	Total	SP	FS	Silver	Club	Total	SP	FS	Gold	Club	Total	SP	FS	Source
2000		Marigold IceUnity	HL				Rockettes	HTK				Team Unique	HSK				
2001		Rockettes	HTK				Marigold IceUnity	HL				Team Unique	HSK				
2002		Marigold IceUnity	HL				Rockettes	HTK				Team Unique	HSK				
2003		Marigold IceUnity	HL				Team Unique	HSK				Rockettes	HTK				
2004		Marigold IceUnity	HL				Rockettes	HTK				Team Unique	HSK				
2005		Marigold IceUnity	HL				Rockettes	HTK				Team Unique	HSK				
2006	Helsinki	Marigold IceUnity	HL	192.81			Rockettes	HTK	191.12			Team Unique	HSK	147.16			
2007	Helsinki	Marigold IceUnity	HL	200.48			Team Unique	HSK	196.58			Rockettes	HTK	196.39			
2008	Helsinki	Rockettes	HTK	221.80	79.32	142.48	Marigold IceUnity	HL	220.85	78.40	142.45	Team Unique	HSK	217.21	76.07	141.14	
2009	Helsinki	Marigold IceUnity	HL	222.27	80.74	141.53	Team Unique	HSK	218.24	79.20	139.04	Rockettes	HTK	214.96	78.87	136.09	
Year	Location	Gold	Club	Total	SP	FS	Silver	Club	Total	SP	FS	Gold	Club	Total	SP	FS	Source
2010	Espoo	Rockettes	HTK	238.88	85.94	152.94	Marigold IceUnity	HL	228.32	80.17	148.15	Team Unique	HSK	220.93	79.33	141.60	
2011	Espoo	Rockettes	HTK	212.68	68.87	143.81	Marigold IceUnity	HL	210.97	72.24	138.73	Team Unique	HSK	201.73	67.57	134.16	
2012	Espoo	Rockettes	HTK	213.96	72.96	141.00	Marigold IceUnity	HL	211.42	71.04	140.38	Team Unique	HSK	203.00	65.63	137.37	
2013	Turku	Team Unique	HSK	208.60	74.92	133.68	Marigold IceUnity	HL	206.34	67.80	138.54	Rockettes	HTK	205.36	68.86	136.50	
2014	Helsinki	Marigold IceUnity	HL	217.46	74.82	142.64	Rockettes	HTK	211.38	70.92	140.46	Team Unique	HSK	208.88	69.66	139.22	
2015	Helsinki	Marigold IceUnity	HL	223.74	73.68	150.06	Rockettes	HTK	213.48	69.24	144.24	Team Unique	HSK	211.88	71.10	140.78	
2016	Helsinki	Team Unique	HSK	203.42	72.28	131.14	Marigold IceUnity	HL	200.47	71.48	128.99	Rockettes	HTK	199.76	71.21	128.55	
2017	Espoo																
2018	Helsinki	Marigold IceUnity	HL	204.60	71.74	132.86	Rockettes	HTK	202.30	72.62	129.68	Team Unique	HSK	201.84	70.56	131.28	
2019	Turku	Rockettes	HTK	223.82	82.37	141.45	Marigold IceUnity	HL	220.65	80.31	140.34	Team Unique	HSK	218.84	78.81	140.03	
Year	Location	Gold	Club	Total	SP	FS	Silver	Club	Total	SP	FS	Gold	Club	Total	SP	FS	Source
2020	Espoo	Rockettes	HTK	228.96	78.21	150.75	Team Unique	HSK	226.32	78.40	147.92	Marigold IceUnity	HL	220.78	75.98	144.80	
2021	Espoo	Rockettes	HTK	216.76	73.02	143.74	Team Unique	HSK	207.83	73.36	134.47	Marigold IceUnity	HL	205.99	71.66	134.33	
2022	Tampere	Rockettes	HTK	229.04		145.81	Marigold IceUnity	HL	226.93		146.47	Dream Edges	Kaari	216.89		143.95	
2023	Helsinki	Team Unique	HSK	235.12	75.64	159.48	Rockettes	HTK	233.80	77.87	155.93	Marigold IceUnity	HL	227.78	73.86	153.92	
2024	Helsinki	Rockettes	HTK	230.65	77.27	153.38	Marigold IceUnity	HL	221.54	71.96	149.58	Team Unique	HSK	214.26	74.55	139.71	
2025	Helsinki	Team Unique	HSK	221.17	77.93	143.24	Rockettes	HTK	220.75	78.64	142.11	Marigold IceUnity	HL	212.83	70.42	142.41	
2026	Helsinki	Rockettes	HTK	236.91	82.10	154.81	Team Unique	HSK	234.38	80.22	154.16	Lumineers	ESS	221.39	76.91	144.48	
Clubs: EVT = Etelä-Vantaan Taitoluistelijat, HL = Helsingin Luistelijat, HSK = Helsingfors Skridskoklubb, HTK = Helsingin Taitoluisteluklubi, TRT = Turun Riennon Taitoluistelu

=== Junior teams ===
Year	Location	Gold	Club	Total	SP	FS	Silver	Club	Total	SP	FS	Gold	Club	Total	SP	FS	Source
1991		The Rockets	HTK				Finettes	HTK				Filiae Aboenses	TRT				
1992		Rockettes	HTK				Filiae Aboenses	TRT				Step by Step	EVT				
1993		Step by Step	EVT				Filiae Aboenses	TRT				Team Fintastic	HTK				
1994		Team Unique	HSK				Step by Step	EVT				Team Fintastic	HTK				
1995		Team Unique	HSK				Team Fintastic	HTK				Energetics	ETK				
1996		Golden Magic	TTK				Energetics	ETK				Team Fintastic	HTK				
1997		Energetics	ETK				Golden Magic	TTK				Musketeers	HL				
1998		Musketeers	HL				Team Fintastic	HTK				Filiae Aboenses	TRT				
1999		Filiae Aboenses	TRT				Musketeers	HL				Steps on Ice	EVT				
2000		Filiae Aboenses	TRT				Team Fintastic	HTK				Reflections	ETK				
2001		Team Fintastic	HTK				Musketeers	HL				Team Mystique	HSK				
2002		Team Fintastic	HTK				Steps on Ice	EVT				Musketeers	HL				
2003		Musketeers	HL				Team Fintastic	HTK				Team Mystique	HSK				
2004		Musketeers	HL				Team Fintastic	HTK				Steps on Ice	EVT				
2005		Musketeers	HL				Team Fintastic	HTK				Team Mystique	HSK				
2006	Helsinki	Musketeers	HL	130.47			Team Fintastic	HTK	119.97			Les Miracles	JOKA	116.15			
2007	Helsinki	Team Fintastic	HTK	168.10			Ice Steps	EVT	159.53			Musketeers	HL	155.98			
2008	Helsinki	Les Miracles	JOKA	188.74	71.62	117.12	Musketeers	HL	180.21	66.11	114.10	Team Mystique	HSK	179.83	66.17	113.66	
2009	Helsinki	Musketeers	HL	189.51	69.37	120.14	Team Fintastic	HTK	183.11	63.52	119.59	Team Mystique	HSK	166.27	65.90	100.37	
2010	Espoo	Team Fintastic	HTK	198.60	75.45	123.15	Team Mystique	HSK	189.01	71.04	117.97	Musketeers	HL	183.95	72.02	111.93	
2011	Espoo	Team Fintastic	HTK	174.15	60.43	113.72	Musketeers	HL	168.26	57.18	111.08	Team Mystique	HSK	160.81	55.24	105.57	
2012	Espoo	Musketeers	HL	161.39	52.56	108.83	Team Fintastic	HTK	159.91	52.17	107.74	Team Mystique	HSK	149.16	51.88	97.28	
2013	Turku	Musketeers	HL	168.26	56.56	111.70	Team Fintastic	HTK	164.44	58.40	106.04	Team Mystique	HSK	142.52	50.90	91.62	
2014	Helsinki	Musketeers	HL	179.58	56.68	122.90	Team Fintastic	HTK	175.64	58.66	116.98	Team Mystique	HSK	157.10	52.04	105.06	
2015	Helsinki	Musketeers	HL	172.36	60.86	111.50	Team Fintastic	HTK	169.00	59.60	109.40	Stella Polaris	OLK	150.62	53.98	96.64	
2016	Helsinki	Musketeers	HL	165.41	61.78	103.63	Team Mystique	HSK	164.90	62.35	102.55	Team Fintastic	HTK	155.59	53.95	101.64	
Clubs: ETK = Espoon Taitoluisteluklubi, EVT = Etelä-Vantaan Taitoluistelijat, HL = Helsingin Luistelijat, HSK = Helsingfors Skridskoklubb, HTK = Helsingin Taitoluisteluklubi, JOKA = Joensuun Kataja, OLK = Oulun Luistelukerho, TRT = Turun Riennon Taitoluistelu

=== Novice teams ===
Year	Location	Gold	Club	Total (FS)	Silver	Club	Total (FS)	Bronze	Club	Total (FS)	Source
2010	Espoo	Starlights	HL	61.27	Finettes	HTK	60.33	Dream Steps	EVT	60.13	
2011	Espoo	Finettes	HTK	65.89	Blue Arrows	ETK	60.59	Team Dynamique	HSK	60.02	
2012	Espoo	Finettes	HTK	60.19	Team Dynamique	HSK	54.15	Starlights	HL	53.95	
2013	Turku	Finettes	HTK	58.15	Team Dynamique	HSK	55.27	Starlights	HL	54.73	
2014	Helsinki	Team Dynamique	HSK	66.76	Finettes	HTK	65.78	Starlights	HL	63.96	
2015	Helsinki	Finettes	HTK	59.93	Team Dynamique	HSK	57.10	Starlights	HL	56.26	
2016	Helsinki	Team Dynamique	HSK	65.22	Finettes	HTK	64.93	Starlights	HL	62.53	
Clubs: ETK = Espoon Taitoluisteluklubi, EVT = Etelä-Vantaan Taitoluistelijat, HL = Helsingin Luistelijat, HSK = Helsingfors Skridskoklubb, HTK = Helsingin Taitoluisteluklubi
