= Musketeers (synchronized skating team) =

Finnish junior synchronized skating team

Team information
- Country represented: Finland
- Formed: 1996
- Home town: Helsinki, Finland
- Skating club: Helsingin Luistelijat
- Level: Junior
- World standing: 2

ISU team best scores
- Combined total: 183.20; 2013 Junior Worlds
- Short program: 68.52; 2009 Junior World Challenge Cup
- Free skate: 121.63; 2013 Junior Worlds
Medal record
Representing Finland
Synchronized skating
World Junior Championships
| Gold medal – first place | 2013 Helsinki | Synchronized skating |
| Gold medal – first place | 2015 Zagreb | Synchronized skating |
| Bronze medal – third place | 2017 Mississauga | Synchronized skating |

Musketeers are a junior-level synchronized skating team representing the figure skating club Helsingin Luistelijat, based in Helsinki, Finland.

Helsingin Luistelijat also fields Marigold IceUnity at the senior level, Starlights at the novice level, Sunlights at the Juvenile level and Creme De Ments at the adult level.

Musketeers are the reigning World Junior Champions. In addition to the 2013 Championship, they have won the Junior World Junior Challenge Cup four times from 2006–2009, the silver medal two times and the bronze medal four times.

The team's motto is “One for all and all for one”.

== Competitive results ==
=== Seasons 2000–10 ===
National
| Event | 2000–01 | 2001–02 | 2002–03 | 2003–04 | 2004–05 | 2005–06 | 2006–07 | 2007–08 | 2008–09 | 2009–10 |
|---|---|---|---|---|---|---|---|---|---|---|
| 1st Finnish Championships; Qualifier | | | | 1st | 1st | 2nd | 4th | 3rd | 1st | 2nd |
| 2nd Finnish Championships; Qualifier | | | | | 1st | 2nd | 3rd | 1st | 2nd | 2nd |
| Finnish Championships | 2nd | 3rd | 1st | 1st | 1st | 1st | 3rd | 2nd | 1st | 3rd |
International
| Event | 2000–01 | 2001–02 | 2002–03 | 2003–04 | 2004–05 | 2005–06 | 2006–07 | 2007–08 | 2008–09 | 2009–10 |
| Junior World Challenge Cup | DNQ | 3rd | 1st | 1st | 1st | 1st | DNQ | 3rd | 3rd | 3rd |
| Source | DNQ | | | | | | DNQ | | | |
| Cup of Berlin | | | | | | | | 5th | | |
| Source | | | | | | | | | | |
| Finlandia Cup | | 2nd | | 1st | | | | 2nd | | 2nd |
| Source | | | | | | | | | | |
| French Cup | | | | | | 2nd | | | | 1st |
| Source | | | | | | | | | | |
| Prague Cup | | | | | | | 1st | 1st | | |
| Source | | | | | | | | | | |
| Spring Cup | | 3rd | | | | | 2nd | | | |
| Source | | | | | | | | | | |
DNQ = did not qualify

=== Seasons 2010–15 ===
National
| Event | 2010–11 | 2011–12 | 2012–13 | 2013–14 | 2014–15 |
|---|---|---|---|---|---|
| 1st Finnish Championships; Qualifier | 2nd | 2nd | 2nd | 1st | 1st |
| 2nd Finnish Championships; Qualifier | 1st | 2nd | 2nd | 2nd | 1st |
| Finnish Championships | 2nd | 1st | 1st | 1st | |
International
| Event | 2010–11 | 2011–12 | 2012–13 | 2013–14 | 2014–15 |
| World Junior Championships | (not held) | | 1st | (not held) | |
| Source | (not held) | | | (not held) | |
| Junior World Challenge Cup | 2nd | 2nd | (not held) | 3rd | (not held) |
| Source | | | (not held) | | (not held) |
| Cup of Berlin | | | | | 1st |
| Source | | | | | |
| French Cup | | | 1st | | |
| Source | | | | | |
| Spring Cup | | | | | |
| Source | | | | | |
