= Miami University Synchronized Skating Team =

American synchronized skating team

Miami University
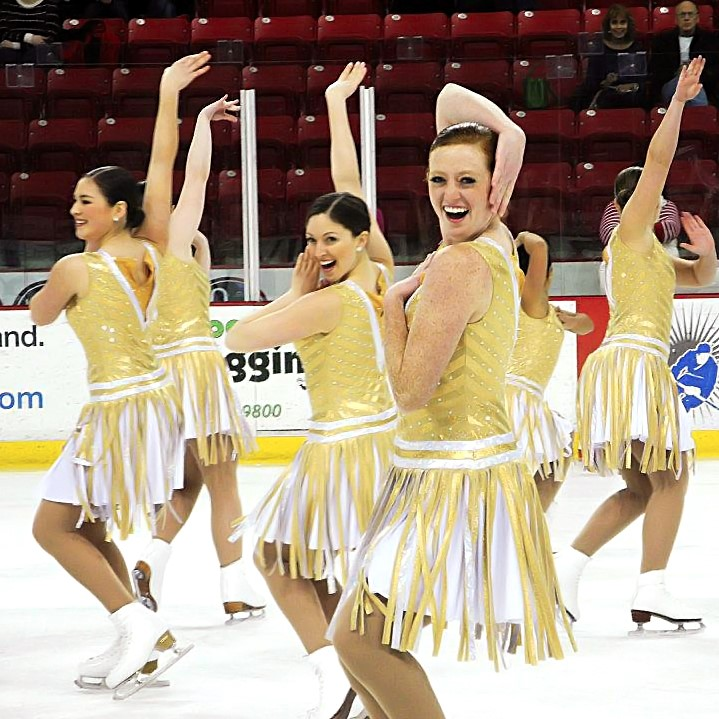
- Miami University Senior team in 2013

Team information
- Country represented: United States
- Formed: 1984
- Home town: Oxford, Ohio
- Coach: Katey Nyquist and Sammie Levine (since 2024)
- Former coach: Vicki Korn (1984-2009), Carla DeGirolamo (2009-2024)
- Skating club: Miami University
- Level: Senior
- Training locations: Oxford, Ohio
- World standing: 15 (as of June 2022); 18 (2020–21); 20 (2019–20); 19 (2018–19); 13 (2017–18); 7 (2016–17); 8 (2015–16); 14 (2014–15); ? (2013–14); 14 (2013–13); 14 (2011–12); 17 (2010–11)

ISU team best scores
- Combined total: 204.90; 2022 Worlds
- Short program: 71.77; 2022 Worlds
- Free skate: 133.13; 2022 Worlds
Medal record
Representing United States
Synchronized skating
World Championships
Silver medal – second place	2007 London	Synchronized skating

The Miami University Synchronized Skating Team is a senior-level synchronized skating team from the United States. Their homeclub is Miami University, in Oxford, Ohio. They were the U.S. national champions in 1999, 2006 and 2009. They became the first American team to medal at the ISU World Synchronized Skating Championships by earning the silver medal at the 2007 championships in London, Ontario, Canada. They are three-time winners of the EDI Award for Best Synchronized Skating Performance at the U.S. national championships.

The varsity program also has a collegiate-level team which holds the record in U.S. Figure Skating for most consecutive national titles (2005–2016) in any discipline of skating at any level, with a total of 18 national titles.

Their programs have included choreography by Sarah Kawahara, Scott Brown, Ben Agosto, and Katherine Hill.

The team trains at the Goggin Ice Center, at Miami University.

== Competitive highlights ==
Competition placements since the 2019-20 season
Season	2019-20	2020-21	2021-22	2022-23	2023-24	2024-25	2025-26
World Championships		C	6th	6th			
U.S. Championships	4th	C	2nd	2nd	3rd	2nd	3rd
CS Brittania Cup							4th
CS Budapest Cup					6th		
CS Hevelius Cup					6th		
CS International Classic						7th	
CS Mozart Cup				5th			
CS Spring Cup				6th			
Hevelius Cup							5th

Competition placements between the 2009-10 and 2018-19 season
Season	2009-10	2010-11	2011-12	2012-13	2013-14	2014-15	2015-16	2016-17	2017-18	2018-19
World Championships		10th		8th		8th	9th			
U.S. Championships	3rd	2nd	3rd	2nd	4th	2nd	2nd	4th	3rd	4th
Cup of Berlin									3rd	
French Cup								7th		
Leon Lurje Trophy				3rd					5th	5th
Mozart Cup					4th	3rd	2nd	2nd		
Neuchâtel Trophy	2nd									
Spring Cup		3rd					2nd			
Zagreb Snowflakes Trophy										4th

Competition placements between the 1999-00 and 2008-09 season
Season	1999-00	2000-01	2001-02	2002-03	2003-04	2004-05	2005-06	2006-07	2007-08	2008-09
World Championships		9th	9th	9th		7th	4th	2nd	9th	7th
U.S. Championships	2nd	2nd	2nd	2nd	4th	2nd	1st	2nd	2nd	1st
Finlandia Cup	9th									
French Cup			9th						3rd	
Neuchâtel Trophy				3rd						
Prague Cup		1st								5th
Spring Cup	9th				2nd	3rd	2nd	2nd		
