= Les Suprêmes =

Les Suprêmes (The Supreme Ones) may refer to the following:

- Les Suprêmes (senior synchronized skating team), which represents the Canadian figure skating club Club de Patinage Artistique de Saint-Léonard (CPA St-Léonard)
- Les Suprêmes (junior synchronized skating team), which represents the Canadian figure skating club Club de Patinage Artistique de Saint-Léonard (CPA St-Léonard)
