= ISU Figure Skating Championships =

Figure skating competitions recognized by the ISU

The International Skating Union organizes six annual Championships for figure skating. It is at the discretion of each member country which skaters, pairs or synchronized skating teams are sent to which championship.

No skater in men's single skating, women's single skating, pair skating and ice dancing can compete at all four competitions in one season, but some skaters have competed at all four over the course of their careers. The Championships for men's singles, women's singles, pair skating and ice dancing are:

- World Figure Skating Championships, World-level competition for senior-level skaters.
- World Junior Figure Skating Championships, World-level competition for junior-level skaters.
- European Figure Skating Championships, the oldest ISU Championship, open to skaters from European countries.
- Four Continents Figure Skating Championships, the newest ISU Championship, open to skaters from non-European countries.

The Championships for synchronized skating are held separately from the four other disciplines and they are:

- World Synchronized Skating Championships, World-level competition for senior-level synchronized skating teams.
- World Junior Synchronized Skating Championships, World-level competition for junior-level synchronized skating teams.
