= Chicago jazz =

Chicago jazz may refer to:

- Chicago Jazz (synchronized skating team), a junior-level synchronized skating team
- Chicago jazz, Chicago-style Dixieland jazz

== See also ==
- Chicago Jazz Festival
- Music of Chicago
