= Team Surprise =

Swedish synchronized skating team, 1985–2018

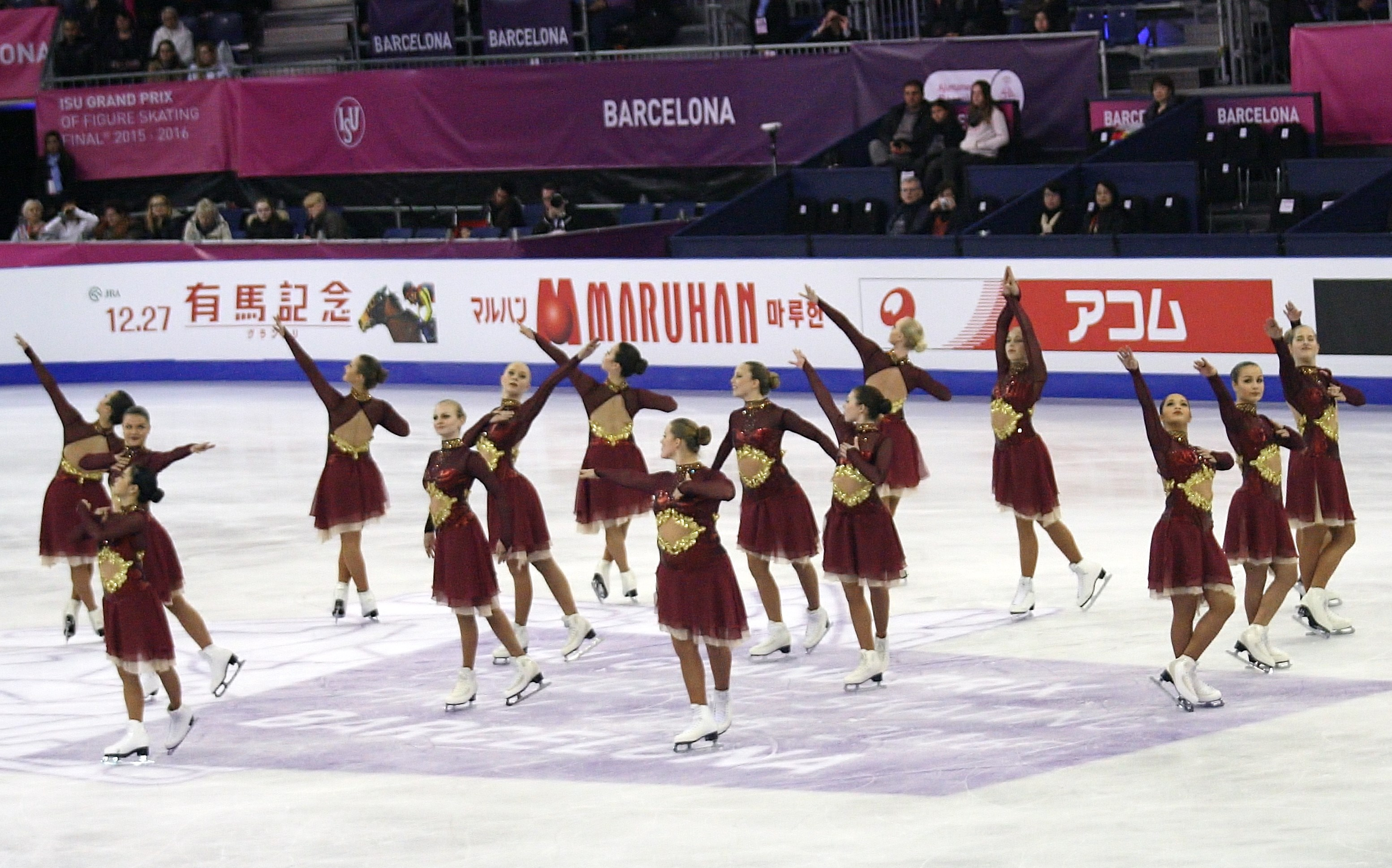

Team information
- Country represented: Sweden
- Formed: 1985
- Retired: 2018
- Home town: Landvetter, Sweden
- Coach: Andrea Dohany
- Skating club: Landvetter Konståkningsklubb
- Level: Senior
- World standing: 5 (2017–18); 8 (2016–17); 4 (2015–16); 3 (2014–15); ? (2013–14); 4 (2012–13); 6 (2011–12); 9 (2010–11)

ISU team best scores
- Combined total: 247.44 (WR); 2004 Neuchâtel Trophy
- Short program: 87.84 (WR); 2004 Neuchâtel Trophy
- Free skate: 159.60 (WR); 2004 Neuchâtel Trophy
Medal record
Representing Sweden
Synchronized skating
World Championships
Gold medal – first place	2000 Minneapolis	Synchronized skating
Gold medal – first place	2001 Helsinki	Synchronized skating
Gold medal – first place	2003 Ottawa	Synchronized skating
Gold medal – first place	2005 Gothenburg	Synchronized skating
Gold medal – first place	2007 London	Synchronized skating
Gold medal – first place	2012 Gothenburg	Synchronized skating
Silver medal – second place	2002 Rouen	Synchronized skating
Silver medal – second place	2004 Zagreb	Synchronized skating
Silver medal – second place	2006 Prague	Synchronized skating
Silver medal – second place	2008 Budapest	Synchronized skating
Silver medal – second place	2018 Stockholm	Synchronized skating
Bronze medal – third place	2009 Zagreb	Synchronized skating

Team Surprise was a senior synchronized skating team from Sweden. Established in 1985, they were the world's most successful team with six world championships and 12 medals in total, placing off podium only in 2010, 2011, and 2013–17.

On 3 October 2018 the team announced their disbandment.

== Programs ==
Season	Short program	Free skating
2017-18	"The Winner Takes It All": Performed by ABBA, The Original Band, and Norrköping Symphony Orchestra	Mother Nature: from Planet Earth II; composed by Jacob Shea and Jasha Klebe; Tracks used: 1. "Early Morning Fog"; 2. "Racer Snakes vs Iguanas"

== Competitive highlights ==
=== 2009-10 to 2017-18 seasons ===
International
Event	2009–10	2010–11	2011–12	2012–13	2013–14	2014–15	2015–16	2016–17	2017–18
World Championships	6th	4th	1st	7th	5th	5th	6th	7th	2nd
Winter Universiade		WD							
French Cup	5th								
Leon Lurje Trophy				2nd	2nd				
Neuchâtel Trophy	1st								
Spring Cup		1st	1st	1st	1st				
WD = withdrew

=== 1999-00 to 2008-09 seasons ===
International
Event	1999–00	2000–01	2001–02	2002–03	2003–04	2004–05	2005–06	2006–07	2007–08	2008–09
World Championships	1st	1st	2nd	1st	2nd	1st	2nd	1st	2nd	3rd
Cup of Berlin									2nd	
French Cup							1st			
Neuchâtel Trophy			1st	1st	1st				1st	
Prague Cup					1st					3rd
Spring Cup	1st	1st				1st		1st		
