= Helsinki Fintastic =

Finnish junior synchronized skating team

Team information
- Country represented: Finland
- Formed: 1986
- Home town: Helsinki, Finland
- Coach: Nina Sandsund
- Skating club: Helsingin Taitoluisteluklubi
- Level: Junior
- World standing: 1

ISU team best scores
- Combined total: 192.63; 2010 Junior World Challenge Cup
- Short program: 75.40; 2010 Junior World Challenge Cup
- Free skate: 118.68; 2013 Junior Worlds
Medal record
Representing Finland
Synchronized skating
World Junior Championships
Gold medal – first place	2020 Nottingham	Synchronized skating
Gold medal – first place	2022 Innsbruck	Synchronized skating
Gold medal – first place	2023 Angers	Synchronized skating
Silver medal – second place	2013 Helsinki	Synchronized skating
Silver medal – second place	2015 Zagreb	Synchronized skating
Silver medal – second place	2017 Mississauga	Synchronized skating

Helsinki Fintastic are a junior-level synchronized skating team from Helsinki, Finland, representing the figure skating club Helsingin Taitoluisteluklubi (HTK). They are the most successful junior team in the world. Team Fintastic are the 2023, 2022 and 2020 World Junior Champions, five-time world silver medalists (2013, 2015, 2017, 2024 and 2025) and have eight victories at the Junior World Challenge Cup, with seven consecutive victories from 2007 to 2014.

== Competitive results (2000–10) ==
National
Event	2000–01	2001–02	2002–03	2003–04	2004–05	2005–06	2006–07	2007–08	2008–09	2009–10
1st Finnish Championships; Qualifier				3rd	4th	1st	3rd	1st	2nd	1st
2nd Finnish Championships; Qualifier					3rd	1st	1st	2nd	1st	3rd
Finnish Championships	1st	1st	2nd	(N/A)	2nd	2nd	1st	4th	2nd	1st
International
Event	2000–01	2001–02	2002–03	2003–04	2004–05	2005–06	2006–07	2007–08	2008–09	2009–10
Junior World Challenge Cup	1st	5th	(DNQ)	(DNQ)	(DNQ)	2nd	1st	1st	1st	1st
Cup of Berlin								1st		2nd
Finlandia Cup		1st		2nd				1st		1st
French Cup							1st		2nd	
Prague Cup			2nd		2nd					
Spring Cup		5th								
DNQ = did not qualify

== Competitive results (2010–14) ==
National
Event	2010–11	2011–12	2012–13	2013–14	2014–15
1st Finnish Championships; Qualifier	1st	1st	1st	2nd	2nd
2nd Finnish Championships; Qualifier	2nd	1st	1st	1st	2nd
Finnish Championships	1st	2nd	2nd	2nd	
International
Event	2010–11	2011–12	2012–13	2013–14	2014–15
World Junior Championships (WJSSC) or Junior World Challenge Cup (JWCC)	1st (JWCC)	1st (JWCC)	2nd (WJSSC)	1st (JWCC)	
Cup of Berlin	1st		1st		
French Cup		2nd		1st	
