= Team Paradise =

Synchronized skating team from Russia

Paradise
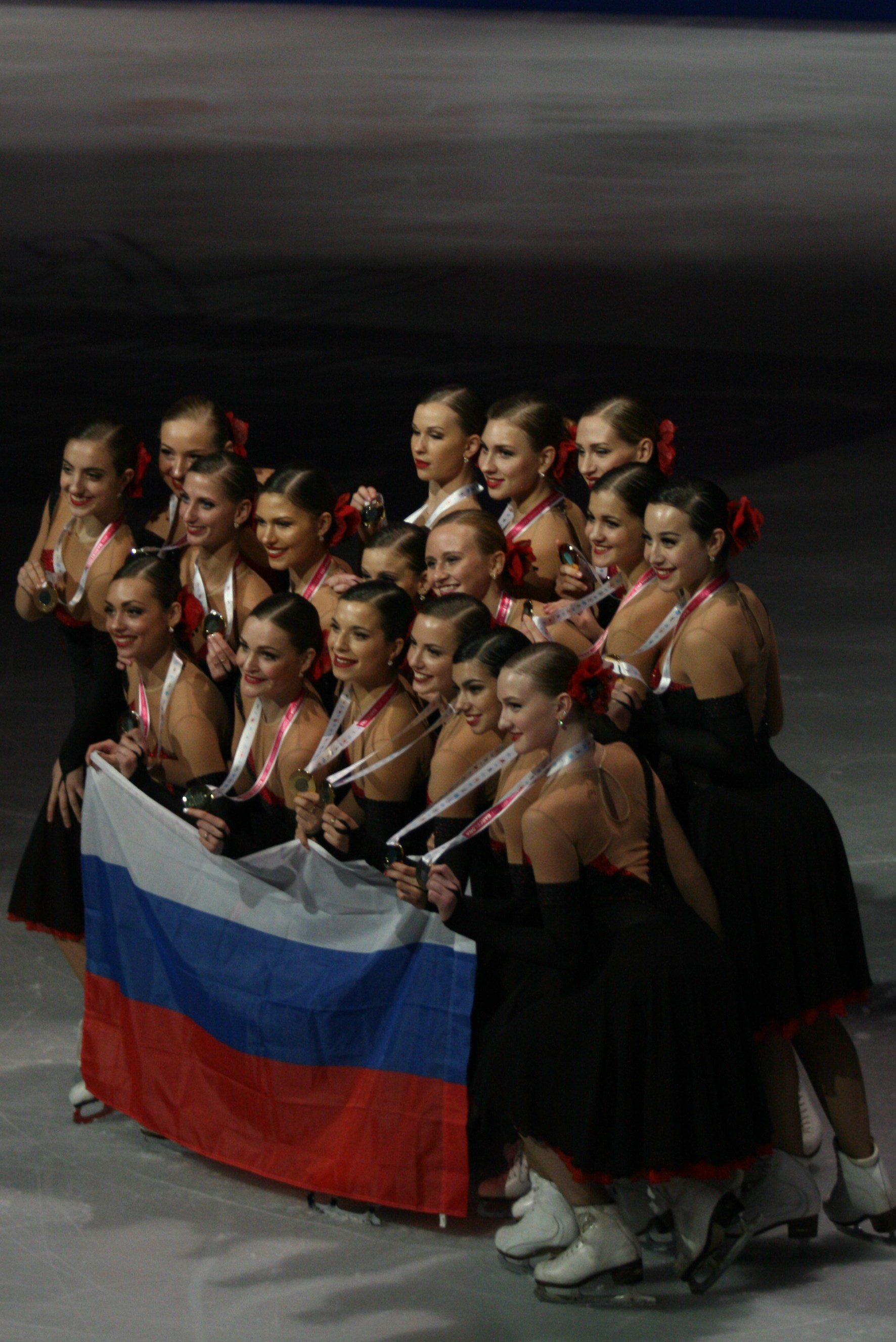

Team information
- Country represented: Russia
- Home town: Saint Petersburg
- Coach: Irina Yakovleva
- Level: Senior
- World standing: 1

ISU team best scores
- Combined total: 220.54; 2014 Zagreb Snowflakes Trophy
- Short program: 76.05; 2018 Worlds
- Free skate: 145.84; 2014 Zagreb Snowflakes Trophy
Medal record
Representing Russia
Synchronized skating
World Championships
Gold medal – first place	2016 Budapest	Synchronized skating
Gold medal – first place	2017 Colorado Springs	Synchronized skating
Gold medal – first place	2019 Helsinki	Synchronized skating
Bronze medal – third place	2015 Hamilton	Synchronized skating
Bronze medal – third place	2018 Stockholm	Synchronized skating

Team Paradise are a senior-level synchronized skating team representing Russia. They are three-time (2016, 2017 and 2019) World Champions, they claimed the 2015 World Championships bronze medals, and they are the 1999-2017 Russian National Champions.

After the 2022 Russian invasion of Ukraine, the ISU banned all athletes from Russia and Belarus from events until further notice.

== Competitive Highlights ==
=== Results since 2010-11 ===
International
Event	2010–11	11–12	12–13	13–14	14–15	15–16	16–17	17–18	18-19	19–20	20-21	21-22	22-23	23-24
World Championships	7th	5th	5th	4th	3rd	1st	1st	3rd	1st	Cancelled	(did not compete)		(did not compete)	
Grand Prix Final						1st					(did not compete)		(did not compete)	
Budapest Cup							1st	1st	1st		(did not compete)		(did not compete)	
Finlandia Trophy			3rd	2nd	2nd	2nd	1st	2nd	2nd	1st	(did not compete)	1st	(did not compete)	
French Cup		3rd	2nd	4th	4th	1st	1st	1st	1st	4th CS	(did not compete)		(did not compete)	
Leon Lurje Trophy									1st	1st CS	(did not compete)		(did not compete)	
London Synchrofest		4th									(did not compete)		(did not compete)	
Lumiere Cup											(did not compete)	1st CS	(did not compete)	
Neuchâtel Trophy				1st		1st					(did not compete)	1st	(did not compete)	
ISU Shanghai Trophy						1st		1st			(did not compete)		(did not compete)	
Zagreb Snowflakes Trophy	1st	1st	1st	1st							(did not compete)		(did not compete)	
National
Russian Championships	1st	1st	1st	1st	1st	1st	1st	1st	1st	1st	1st	2nd	1st	1st
CS - Denotes challenger series competitions

=== Competitive results (1999–2010) ===
International
Event	1999–00	2000–01	2001–02	2002–03	2003–04	2004–05	2005–06	2006–07	2007–08	2008–09	2009–10
World Championships	9th	8th	7th	7th	8th	9th	5th	7th	8th	10th	7th
Finlandia Cup	8th		4th								
French Cup	7th	1st	2nd	3rd	1st	3rd			4th	5th	4th
Neuchâtel Trophy								1st			
Prague Cup						5th			2nd	4th	
Spring Cup					1st						
Zagreb Snowflakes Trophy							1st	1st	1st		
National
Russian Championships									1st	1st	1st
