= Les Suprêmes (senior synchronized skating team) =

Senior synchronized skating team

Les Suprêmes Senior
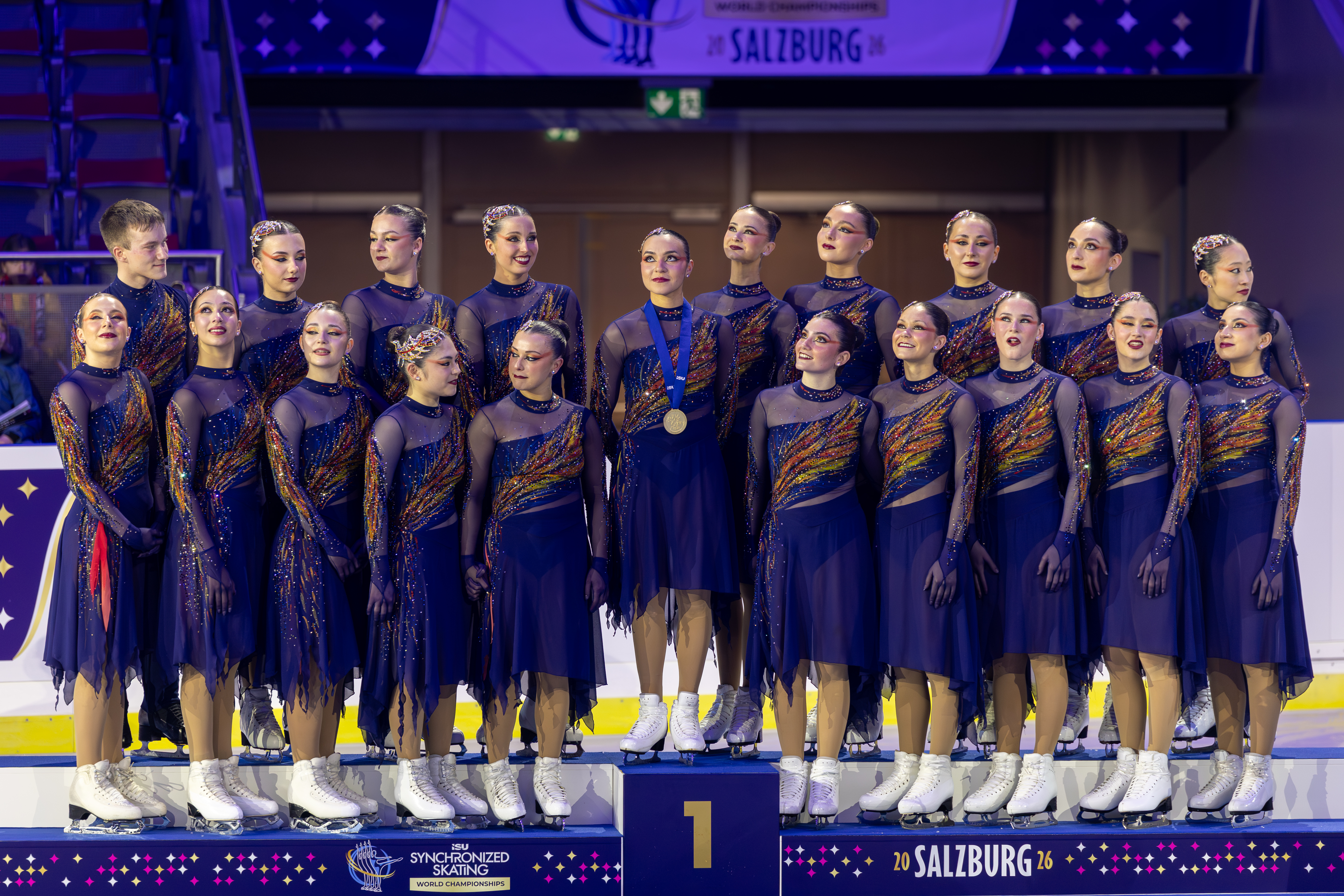
- Les Suprêmes on the podium at the 2026 ISU Synchronized Skating World Championships.

Team information
- Country represented: Canada
- Home town: Montréal
- Coach: Marilyn Langlois, Pascal Denis and Amelie Brochu
- Skating club: Club de Patinage Artistique de Saint-Léonard
- Level: Senior
- World standing: 1

ISU team best scores
- Combined total: 240.98; 2023 Worlds
- Short program: 84.61; 2026 Marie Lundmark Trophy
- Free skate: 161.98; 2023 Worlds
Medal record
Representing Canada
Synchronized skating
World Championships
Gold medal – first place	2022 Hamilton	Synchronized skating
Gold medal – first place	2023 Lake Placid	Synchronized skating
Gold medal – first place	2024 Zagreb	Synchronized skating
Gold medal – first place	2026 Salzburg	Synchronized skating
Bronze medal – third place	2003 Ottawa	Synchronized skating

Les Suprêmes (The Supremes) is the senior-level synchronized skating team representing the figure skating club Club de Patinage Artistique de Saint-Léonard (CPA St-Léonard) in Montréal, Quebec, Canada. CPA St-Léonard fields teams, all named Les Suprêmes, at six levels: star 3, juvenile, novice, open, junior and senior.

They are the first team in the world to ever win three consecutive gold medals (from 2022 to 2024) at the ISU World Synchronized Skating Championships. Their victory in 2022 came almost two decades after the team had last won a world medal (bronze) at the 2003 World Championships. Les Suprêmes were also the number one ranked team in the world at the end of the 2023–2024 season.

== Programs ==
Competition programs by season
Season	Short program	Free skate program
2025–26	"Hymne à l'amour": by Céline Dion	Music from Firebird: by Igor Stravinski

== Competitive results ==
Competition placements since the 2019-20 season
Season	2019-20	2020-21	2021-22	2022-23	2023-24	2024-25	2025-26
World Championships	C	C	1st	1st	1st	4th	1st
Canadian Championships	1st	C	1st	3rd	1st	1st	1st
Budapest Cup					1st (CS)		
California Cup	3rd (CS)						
Dresden Cup						2nd (CS)	
French Cup	3rd (CS)						
International Classic						1st (CS)	
Leon Lurje Trophy				3rd (CS)			
Lumière Cup							1st (CS)
Marie Lundmark Trophy					2nd (CS)		1st (CS)
Spring Cup				1st (CS)			
Budapest Cup						1st	
Riga Amber Cup							1st

Competition placements between the 2010-11 and 2018-19 season
Season	2010-11	2011-12	2012-13	2013-14	2014-15	2015-16	2016-17	2017-18	2018-19
World Championships	6th	7th	6th	6th	6th	5th	8th	5th	
Canadian Championships	2nd	2nd	2nd	2nd	2nd	1st	2nd	2nd	3rd
Budapest Cup							2nd		
French Cup	2nd	4th	5th	6th	5th	4th			5th
Leon Lurje Trophy							3rd		4th
Lumière Cup									1st
Mozart Cup					1st			1st	
Neuchâtel Trophy						2nd			
Shanghai Trophy							4th		
SynchroFest International		5th							

Competition placements between the 2000–01 and 2009–10 season
Season	2000–01	2001–02	2002–03	2003–04	2004–05	2005–06	2006–07	2007–08	2008–09	2009–10
World Championships	6th	5th	3rd	7th	8th		6th	6th		
Canadian Championships	2nd	2nd	1st	1st	2nd	3rd	2nd	2nd	3rd	3rd
Cup of Berlin						3rd				
French Cup							3rd		7th	6th
NA International			2nd							
Prague Cup					4th					
Spring Cup		4th						2nd		
