= Marigold IceUnity =

Synchronized skating team from Helsinki, Finland

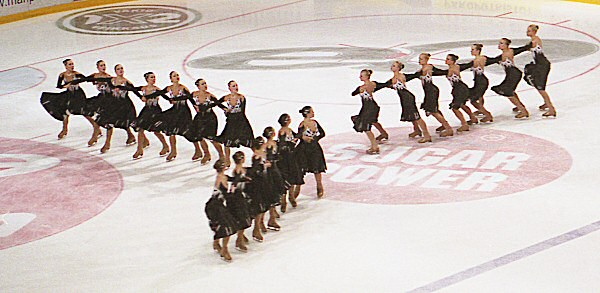
- Marigold IceUnity in 2005

Team information
- Country represented: Finland
- Formed: 1987
- Home town: Helsinki, Finland
- Coach: Anu Oksanen
- Skating club: Helsingin Luistelijat
- Level: Senior
- World standing: 5
- Season's ranking: 1 (2023–24); 11 (2022–23); 3 (2021–22); N/A (2020–21); 3 (2019–20)

ISU team best scores
- Combined total: 232.29; Spring Cup 2020
- Short program: 79.34; French Cup 2020
- Free skate: 153.60; Spring Cup 2020
Medal record
Representing Finland
Synchronized skating
World Championships
Gold medal – first place	2002 Rouen	Synchronized skating
Gold medal – first place	2004 Zagreb	Synchronized skating
Gold medal – first place	2006 Prague	Synchronized skating
Gold medal – first place	2014 Courmayeur	Synchronized skating
Gold medal – first place	2018 Stockholm	Synchronized skating
Silver medal – second place	2003 Ottawa	Synchronized skating
Silver medal – second place	2010 Colorado Springs	Synchronized skating
Silver medal – second place	2011 Helsinki	Synchronized skating
Silver medal – second place	2015 Hamilton	Synchronized skating
Silver medal – second place	2017 Colorado Springs	Synchronized skating
Silver medal – second place	2019 Helsinki	Synchronized skating
Silver medal – second place	2022 Hamilton	Synchronized skating
Bronze medal – third place	2000 Minneapolis	Synchronized skating
Bronze medal – third place	2005 Gothenburg	Synchronized skating

Marigold IceUnity are a senior-level synchronized skating team from Helsinki, Finland, representing the figure skating club Helsingin Luistelijat. Coached by Anu Oksanen and Tiina Turunen, they are five-time World Champions and were ranked second in the world in 2015 by the International Skating Union.

Helsingin Luistelijat also fields the Musketeers at the junior level, Starlights at the novice level, Sunlights at the juvenile level, Sunflowers at the pre-juvenile level, Moonlights and Moonshadows at the basic junior level, Silverlights at the basic novice level, All Stars at the basic senior level, Icemen United (men's team) and Creme De Ments at the adult level.

== Programs ==
	Short program	Free program
2022-23	Who's there ?	The 4 Elements
2021-22	Nordic Spirit; Music: Daniel's Joik, Stars of the Far Nort	From Darkness to Light
2020-21	Nordic Spirit; Music: Daniel's Joik, Stars of the Far Nort	Storm
2019–20	Escape Room	Tribute to Notre-Dame
2018–19	#WhyNot Music: "Chariots of Fire"	Transformers
2017–18	Under the Northern Star Music: "Täällä Pohjantähden alla"	Splash Music: based on music from Sea World water themed shows
2016–17	El Matador Music: based on España cañí, with an intro based on The Krewmen's "El Toreador"	Suomi 100 (Finland 100th Anniversary) Music: based on Jean Sibelius' "Finlandia"
2015–16	Rocky Horror Picture Show	Yin & Yang
2014–15	Bui-Doi	Images of War
2013–14	African Vogue	Spirits
2012–13	Dreamgirls	Chess, The Game of Love
2011–12	I Stand Alone	
2010–11	Be Italian	The Pirate Queen
2009–10	Viidakkoswing	Les Miserables
2008–09	Radio Classic With A Twist	Pandoran Lipas- suomalaisin sävelin

== Competitive highlights ==
Competition placements since the 2019-20 season
Season	2019-20	2020-21	2021-22	2022-23	2023-24	2024-25	2025-26
World Championships	C	C	2nd				
Finnish Championships	3rd	C	2nd	3rd	2nd	3rd	4th
Dresden Cup						1st (CS)	
French Cup	2nd (CS)					1st (CS)	
Hevelius Cup					2nd (CS)		
International Classic							1st (CS)
Leon Lurje Trophy				2nd (CS)			
Lumière Cup					1st (CS)		
Marie Lundmark Trophy							5th (CS)
Neuchâtel Trophy				2nd (CS)			
Spring Cup	2nd (CS)						
Finlandia Trophy	4th		4th	2nd			
Hevelius Cup				1st			
Lumière Cup	1st						
Mozart Cup					1st		
Neuchâtel Trophy			2nd				
Santa Claus Cup						2nd	3rd

Competition placements between the 2010-11 and 2018-19 season
Season	2010-11	2011-12	2012-13	2013-14	2014-15	2015-16	2016-17	2017-18	2018-19
World Championships	2nd	6th	4th	1st	2nd		2nd	1st	2nd
Finnish Championships	2nd	2nd	2nd	1st	1st	2nd	1st	1st	2nd
Cup of Berlin					1st		1st		
Finlandia Trophy			4th	3rd	1st	3rd	2nd	3rd	1st
French Cup		2nd	4th	3rd	1st			4th	2nd
Leon Lurje Trophy			1st						
Mozart Cup	1st	1st		1st		1st	1st		1st
Shanghai Trophy							5th	2nd	
Winter Universiade									2nd

=== Competitive results (1999–2010) ===
International
Event	1999–00	2000–01	01–02	02–03	03–04	04–05	05–06	06–07	07–08	08–09	09–10
World Championships	3rd	4th	1st	2nd	1st	3rd	1st	8th	4th	6th	2nd
Source											
Cup of Berlin									3rd		2nd
Source											
Finlandia Cup	3rd		1st		1st				2nd		1st
Source											
French Cup						1st	2nd	4th	1st		1st
Source											
North American International; Synchronized Skating Competition				1st							
Source											
Prague Cup						1st				1st	
Source											
Spring Cup	2nd							3rd			
Source											
National
Finnish Championships	1st	2nd	1st	1st	1st	1st	1st	1st	2nd	1st	2nd
