= 2017–18 synchronized skating season =

Competitive synchronized skating year from 2017/7/1 to 2018/6/30

2017–17 synchronized skating season
- Date: July 1, 2017 – June 30, 2018
- Previous: 2016–17
- Next: 2018–19

The 2017–18 synchronized skating season began on July 1, 2017, and ended on June 30, 2018. Running concurrent with the 2017–18 figure skating season. During this season, elite synchronized skating teams competed in the ISU Championship level at the 2018 World Championships. They also competed at various other elite level international and national competitions.

== Competitions ==
The 2017–18 season included the following major competitions.

Key

| ISU Championships | Other international | Nationals |

| Date | Event | Type | Level | Location | Details |
|---|---|---|---|---|---|
2017
| November 3–5 | Autumn Cup | Other int | Sen. – Nov. | Granada, Spain | Details |
| November 23–25 | Winter Cup | Other int | Sen. – Nov. | Gullegem, Belgium | Details |
| November 24–26 | Shanghai Trophy | Other int | Senior | Shanghai, China | Details |
| December 1–3 | Australian Figure Skating Championships | Nats | Sen. – Nov. | Brisbane, Australia | Details |
| December 7–10 | Zagrab Snowflakes Trophy | Other int | Sen. – Nov. | Zagreb, Croatia | (Event cancelled) |
| December 14–16 | German Figure Skating Championships | Nats | Sen. – Nov. | Frankfurt, Germany | Details |
| December 14–17 | Italian Figure Skating Championships | Nats | Sen. – | Milan, Italy | Results |
2018
| January 4–7 | Cup of Berlin | Other int | Sen. – Nov. | Berlin, Germany | Details |
| January 11–13 | Russian Synchronized Skating Championship | Nats | Sen. – Nov. | Yoshkar-Ola, Russia | Details |
| January 11–13 | British Synchronized Skating Championships | Nats | Sen. – Nov. | Nottingham, England | Details |
| January 19–21 | Neuchâtel Trophy | Other int | Sen. – Nov. | Neuchâtel, Switzerland | Details |
| January 25–28 | Mozart Cup | Other int | Sen. – Nov. | Salzburg, Austria | Details |
| January 27–28 | Leon Lurje Trophy | Other int | Sen. – Nov. | Gothenburg, Sweden | Details |
| February 2–4 | French Cup | Other int | Sen. – Nov. | Rouen, France | Details |
| February 9–11 | Trophy D'Ecosse | Other int | Sen. – Nov. | Dumfries, England | Details |
| February 10–11 | Japan Synchronized Skating Championships | Nats | Sen. – | Hitachinaka, Japan | Details |
| February 16–18 | Spring Cup | Other int | Sen. – Nov. | Sesto San Giovanni, Italy | Details |
| February 22–25 | U.S. Synchronized Skating Championships | Nats | Sen. – Nov. | Portland, USA | Details |
| February 23–25 | Canadian Synchronized Skating Championships | Nats | Sen. – Nov. | Oshawa, Canada | Details |
| February 24–25 | Swedish Synchronized Skating Championships | Nats | Sen. – Nov. | Gothenburg, Sweden | Details |
| March 1–4 | Budapest Cup | Other int | Sen. – Nov. | Budapest, Hungary | Details |
| March 3–4 | Finnish Synchronized Skating Championships | Nats | Sen. – Nov. | Helsinki, Finland | Details |
| March 16–17 | ISU World Junior Synchronized Skating Championships | ISU Championships | Junior | Zagreb, Croatia | Details |
| April 6–7 | ISU World Synchronized Skating Championships | ISU Championships | Senior | Stockholm, Sweden | Details |
Type: ISU Champ. = ISU Championships; Other int. = International events except ISU Championships; Nats. = National championships Levels: Sen. = Senior; Jun. = Junior; Nov. = Novice

== International medalists ==
Championships
| Competition | Gold | Silver | Bronze | Results |
|---|---|---|---|---|
| Worlds | (Finland) Marigold IceUnity | (Sweden) Team Surprise | (Russia) Team Paradise | |
| Junior Worlds | (Russia) Team Junost | (United States) Skyliners | (Russia) Team Crystal Ice | |
Other senior internationals
| Competition | Gold | Silver | Bronze | Results |
| Autumn Cup | (Belgium) Team Phoenix | (Spain) Team Fusion | (no other competitors) | |
| Winter Cup | (Belgium) Team Phoenix | (United Kingdom) Team Viola | (Latvia) Team Amber | |
| Shanghai Trophy | (Russia) Team Paradise | (Finland) Marigold IceUnity | (Sweden) Team Surprise | |
| Zagreb Snowflakes Trophy | (Competition not held) | | | |
| Cup of Berlin | (United States) Skyliners | (Germany) Team Berlin 1 | (United States) Miami University | |
| Neuchâtel Trophy | (Finland) Rockettes | (Finland) Team Unique | (United States) Haydenettes | |
| Mozart Cup | (Canada) Les Suprêmes | (United States) Skyliners | (Finland) Lumineers | |
| Leon Lurje Trophy | (United States) Haydenettes | (Sweden) Team Surprise | (United States) Miami University | |
| French Cup | (Russia) Team Paradise | (Finland) Team Unique | (Finland) Rockettes | |
| Trophy d'Ecosse | (Canada) NEXXICE | (United States) Adrian College | (United Kingdom) Team Viola | |
| Spring Cup | (Sweden) Team Surprise | (Russia) Tatarstan | (Germany) Team Berlin 1 | |
| Budapest Cup | (Russia) Team Paradise | (Sweden) Team Surprise | (Germany) Team Berlin 1 | |
