= ISU Junior World Challenge Cup =

Synchronized skating competition

The ISU Junior World Challenge Cup was an international synchronized skating competition that determined the best junior teams in the world. Held for the first time in 2001, the competition was sanctioned by International Skating Union. From 2013 to 2016, after the 2013 launch of the World Junior Championships which was to be held in odd-numbered years, the event was held bi-annually in even-numbered years. However, because the World Junior Championships have been held annually since 2017, the last ISU Junior World Challenge Cup took place in 2016.

== Medalists ==
Medalists
Year	Location	Gold	Total	SP	FS	Silver	Total	SP	FS	Bronze	Total	SP	FS	Source(s)
2001	Neuchâtel, Switzerland	(Finland) Team Fintastic	2.5	1.5	1.0	(Canada) Les Suprêmes	2.5	0.5	2.0	(United States) Superettes	4.0	1.0	3.0	
2002	Zagreb, Croatia	(Canada) Ice Image	1.5	0.5	1.0	(Russia) Spartak Leader	4.5	2.5	2.0	(Finland) Musketeers	5.5	1.5	4.0	
2003	Kungsbacka, Sweden	(Finland) Musketeers	1.5	0.5	1.0	(Canada) Burlington Ice Image	3.0	1.0	2.0	(Canada) Les Suprêmes	4.5	1.5	3.0	
2004	Milan, Italy	(Finland) Musketeers	1.5	0.5	1.0	(Finland) Team Mystique	3.5	1.5	2.0	(Canada) Gold Ice	4.0	1.0	3.0	
2005	Neuchâtel, Switzerland	(Finland) Musketeers	150.93	55.95	95.58	(Finland) Team Mystique	148.07	52.11	96.56	(Canada) Gold Ice	138.60	50.89	88.31	
2006	Helsinki, Finland	(Finland) Musketeers	141.61	49.77	91.84	(Finland) Team Fintastic	135.66	43.42	92.24	(United States) Chicago Jazz	123.08	39.69	83.39	
2007	(United Kingdom) Nottingham, Great Britain	(Finland) Team Fintastic	162.08	61.92	100.16	(Canada) Les Suprêmes	159.22	60.70	98.52	(United States) Chicago Jazz	150.32	56.82	93.50	
2008	Rouen, France	(Finland) Team Fintastic	181.18	68.63	112.55	(Canada) Gold Ice	161.57	61.73	99.84	(Finland) Musketeers	160.01	64.37	95.64	
2009	Neuchâtel, Switzerland	(Finland) Team Fintastic	186.88	72.07	114.81	(Canada) NEXXICE	184.32	70.38	113.94	(Finland) Musketeers	176.57	68.52	108.05	
2010	Gothenburg, Sweden	(Finland) Team Fintastic	192.63	75.40	117.23	(Canada) NEXXICE	181.99	70.10	111.89	(Finland) Musketeers	178.82	66.88	111.94	
2011	Neuchâtel, Switzerland	(Finland) Team Fintastic	176.61	59.52	117.09	(Finland) Musketeers	175.77	61.79	113.98	(United States) Team Braemar	172.48	56.02	116.46	
2012	Gothenburg, Sweden	(Finland) Team Fintastic	171.67	55.90	115.77	(Finland) Musketeers	168.76	54.04	114.72	(Canada) Les Suprêmes	146.30	48.64	97.66	
2013	(not held, see the article for the Junior World Championships)													
2014	Neuchâtel, Switzerland	(Finland) Team Fintastic	173.77	56.96	116.81	(Canada) Les Suprêmes	170.89	54.71	116.18	(Finland) Musketeers	167.63	54.53	113.10	
2015	(not held, see the article for the Junior World Championships)													
2016	Zagreb, Croatia	(Canada) Les Suprêmes	179.44	63.71	115.73	(Finland) Team Fintastic	172.91	61.11	111.80	(Russia) Spartak Junost'	169.93	62.02	107.91	
