= 2014–15 synchronized skating season =

- Date: July 1, 2014 – June 30, 2015
- Previous: 2013–14
- Next: 2015–16

The 2014–15 synchronized skating season began on July 1, 2014, and ended on June 30, 2015. During this season, which was concurrent with the season for the other four disciplines (men's single, ladies' single, pair skating and ice dancing).

Elite synchronized skating teams competed on the International Skating Union Championship level at the 2015 World and World Junior Championships. They also competed at various other international as well as national competitions.

== Competitions ==
The 2014–15 season included the following major competitions.

Key

ISU Championships	Other international	Nationals

Date	Event	Type	Level	Location	Details
2014
October 9–12	Finlandia Trophy	Other int.	Sen.	Espoo, Finland	Details
2015
January 9–11	Cup of Berlin	Other int.	Sen., Jun., Nov.	Berlin, Germany	Details
January 16–18	Leon Lurje Trophy	Other int.	Sen., Jun., Nov.	Gothenburg, Sweden	Details
January 23–25	Mozart Cup	Other int.	Sen., Jun., Nov.	Salzburg, Austria	Details
January 30–31	French Cup	Other int.	Sen., Jun., Nov.	Rouen, France	Details
February 6–8	Trophy D'Ecosse	Other int.	Sen., Jun., Nov.	Dumfries, Scotland, United Kingdom	
February 13–15	21st Spring Cup	Other int.	Sen., Jun., Nov.	Sesto San Giovanni, Italy	Details
February 25–28	U.S. Synchronized Skating Championships	Nats.	TBA	Providence, RI, United States	Details
February 27 — March 1	Canadian Synchronized Skating Championships	Nats.	Sen., Jun., Nov.	Quebec City, QC, Canada	Details
February 28 — March 1	Finnish Synchronized Skating Championships	Nats.	Sen., Jun., Nov.	Tampere, Finland	Details
February 28 — March 1	Swedish Synchronized Skating Championships	Nats.	TBA	Tjörn, Sweden	Details
March 13–14	World Junior Championships	ISU Champ.	Junior	Zagreb, Croatia	
March 20–21	Budapest Cup	Other int.	Sen., Jun., Nov.	Neuchâtel, Switzerland	
April 10–11	World Championships	ISU Champ.	Sen.	Hamilton, ON, Canada	
Type: ISU Champ. = ISU Championships; Other int. = International events except ISU Championships; Nats. = National championships; Other nat. = Other national events Levels: Sen. = Senior; Jun. = Junior; BJ = B Junior; Nov. = Novice; BN. = Basic Novice; AN. = Advanced Novice; Int. = Intermediate; Juv. = Juvenile; Ad. = Adult; Mix. = Mixed Age; Col. = Collegiate; TBA = to be announced

=== Cancelled competitions ===
Key

ISU Championships	Other international	Nationals

Date	Event	Type	Level	Location	Details
2015
January 15–17	Zagreb Snowflakes Trophy	Other int.	Sen., Jun., Nov.	Zagreb, Croatia	
February 6–8	Jégvirág Cup	Other int.	Sen., Jun., Nov.	Miskolc, Hungary	
February 19–21	Neuchâtel Trophy	Other int.	Sen., Jun., Nov.	Neuchâtel, Switzerland	
Type: Other int. = International events except ISU Championships; Levels: Sen. = Senior; Jun. = Junior; Nov. = Novice

== International medalists ==
Championships
Competition	Gold	Silver	Bronze	Results
Worlds	(Canada) NEXXICE	(Finland) Marigold IceUnity	(Russia) Paradise	
Junior Worlds	(Finland) Musketeers	(Finland) Team Fintastic	(Canada) Les Suprêmes	
Other senior internationals
Competition	Gold	Silver	Bronze	Results
Finlandia Trophy	(Finland) Marigold IceUnity	(Russia) Paradise	(Finland) Team Unique	
Cup of Berlin	(Finland) Marigold IceUnity	(Finland) Team Unique	(Germany) Team Berlin 1	
Leon Lurje Trophy	(Sweden) Team Surprise	(Sweden) Team Boomerang	(United States) Starlights	
Mozart Cup	(Canada) Les Suprêmes	(Finland) Rockettes	(United States) Miami University	
French Cup	(Finland) Marigold IceUnity	(Finland) Rockettes	(Finland) Team Unique	
Trophy D'Ecosse				
21st Spring Cup	(Canada) NEXXICE	(Sweden) Team Surprise	(United States) Haydenettes	
Budapest Cup				
Other junior internationals
Competition	Gold	Silver	Bronze	Source
Cup of Berlin	(Finland) Musketeers	(Finland) Team Mystique	(Finland) Stella Polaris	
Leon Lurje Trophy	(Sweden) Team Convivium	(Finland) FireBlades	(Sweden) Team Spirit	
Mozart Cup	(Russia) Crystal Ice	(United States) Lexettes	(Canada) Les Pirouettes	
French Cup	(Canada) Les Suprêmes	(Russia) Spartak Junost'	(Finland) Team Fintastic	
Trophy D'Ecosse				
21st Spring Cup	(Russia) Idel	(Canada) NEXXICE	(Sweden) Team Convivium	
Budapest Cup				

== Season's best scores ==
=== Senior teams ===
Rank	Name	Country	Best: Total score	Event	Best: Short program	Event	Best: Free skating	Event
1	NEXXICE	(Canada)	214.73	Worlds	71.06	Worlds	143.67	Worlds
2	Marigold IceUnity	(Finland)	214.06	Worlds	70.39	Worlds	143.67	Worlds
3	Paradise	(Russia)	203.48	Worlds	66.25	Worlds	137.23	Worlds
4	Rockettes	(Finland)	202.44	Worlds	69.11	Worlds	133.33	Worlds
5	Team Surprise	(Sweden)	201.97	Worlds	69.94	Worlds	136.47	21st Spring Cup
6	Les Suprêmes	(Canada)	199.77	Worlds	64.66	Mozart Cup	135.40	Worlds
7	Team Unique	(Finland)	196.34	French Cup	66.21	Cup of Berlin	130.84	French Cup
8	Haydenettes	(United States)	195.77	21st Spring Cup	65.61	Worlds	132.18	21st Spring Cup
9	Tatarstan	(Russia)	178.39	21st Spring Cup	61.25	21st Spring Cup	117.14	21st Spring Cup
10	Miami University	(United States)	171.79	Worlds	55.34	Mozart Cup	117.06	Worlds

=== Junior teams ===
Rank	Name	Country	Best: Total score	Event	Best: Short program	Event	Best: Free skating	Event
1	Les Suprêmes	(Canada)	176.00	French Cup	60.66	French Cup	115.34	French Cup
2	Musketeers	(Finland)	172.98	Junior Worlds	59.08	Junior Worlds	113.90	Junior Worlds
3	Spartak Junost'	(Russia)	169.66	French Cup	58.82	French Cup	110.84	French Cup
4	Team Fintastic	(Finland)	167.78	French Cup	60.95	Junior Worlds	107.66	French Cup
5	Crystal Ice	(Russia)	155.68	Mozart Cup	52.04	Mozart Cup	103.64	Mozart Cup
6	Idel	(Russia)	150.59	21st Spring Cup	54.13	21st Spring Cup	96.46	21st Spring Cup
7	Valley Bay Synchro	(Finland)	149.88	French Cup	52.18	French Cup	97.70	French Cup
8	NEXXICE	(Canada)	148.60	21st Spring Cup	55.68	21st Spring Cup	92.92	21st Spring Cup
9	Team Convivium	(Sweden)	143.25	Leon Lurje Trophy	53.21	Leon Lurje Trophy	93.93	21st Spring Cup
10	Lexettes	(United States)	140.83	Mozart Cup	49.42	Mozart Cup	91.41	Mozart Cup
