= 2016–17 synchronized skating season =

Competitive synchronized skating year from 2016/7/1 to 2017/6/30

- Date: July 1, 2016 – June 30, 2017
- Previous: 2015–16
- Next: 2017–18

The 2016–17 synchronized skating season began on July 1, 2016, and ended on June 30, 2017. Running concurrent with the 2016-17 figure skating season. During this season elite synchronized skating teams competed on the ISU Championship level at the 2017 World Championships. They also competed at various other elite level international and national competitions.

== Competitions ==
The 2016–17 season included the following major competitions.

Key

ISU Championships	Other international	Nationals

Date	Event	Type	Level	Location	Details
2016
November 24-26	Winter Cup	Other int.	Sen.-Nov.	Wevelgem, Belgium	Details
Nov 25-Dec 2	Australian Figure Skating Championships	Nats	Sen.-Nov.	Melbourne, Australia	Details
December 14- 15	Italian Figure Skating Championships	Nats	Sen.-Jun.	Egna, Italy	Details
December 16- 17	German National Championships	Nats	Sen.-Nov.	Berlin, Germany	Details
2017
January 6-7	Cup of Berlin	Other int.	Sen.-Nov.	Berlin, Germany	Details
January 14-15	British Synchronized Skating Championships	Nats	Sen.-Nov.	Nottingham, England	Details
January 19-22	Mozart Cup	Other int.	Sen.-Nov.	Salzburg, Austria	Details
January 27-29	Leon Lurje Trophy	Other int.	Sen.-Nov.	Gothenburg, Sweden	Details
February 3-4	French Cup	Other int.	Sen.-Nov.	Rouen, France	Details
February 10-12	Trophy d'Ecosse	Other int.	Sen.-Nov.	Dumfries, England	Details
February 17-19	Zagreb Snowflakes Trophy	Other int.	Sen.-Nov.	Zagreb, Croatia	Details
February 23-25	U.S. Synchronized Skating Championships	Nats	Sen.-Nov.	Rockford, USA	Details
February 24-26	Spring Cup	Other int.	Sen.-Nov.	Sesto San Giovanni, Italy	Details
February 24-26	Canadian Synchronized Skating Championships	Nats	Sen.-Nov.	Calgary, Canada	Details
February 25-26	Finnish Synchronized Skating Championships	Nats	Sen.-Nov.	Espoo, Finland	Details
February 25-26	Swedish Synchronized Skating Championships	Nats	Sen.-Nov.	Borås, Sweden	Details
March 9-11	ISU World Junior Synchronized Skating Championships	ISU Championships	Junior	Mississauga, Canada	Details
March 16-19	Budapest Cup	Other int.	Sen.-Nov.	Budapest, Hungary	Details
March 17-19	Shanghai Trophy	Other int.	Senior	Shanghai, China	(Event cancelled)
April 7-8	ISU World Synchronized Skating Championships	ISU Championships	Senior	Colorado Springs, USA	Details
Type: ISU Champ. = ISU Championships; Other int. = International events except ISU Championships; Nats. = National championships (only events with two or more participants); Levels: Sen. = Senior;-= Junior; Nov. = Novice; TBA = to be announced

== International medalists ==
Championships
Competition	Gold	Silver	Bronze	Results
Worlds	(Russia) Team Paradise	(Finland) Marigold IceUnity	(Canada) NEXXICE	
Junior Worlds	Team Russia 2	Team Finland 1	Team Finland 2	
Other senior internationals
Competition	Gold	Silver	Bronze	Results
Winter Cup	(Germany) Team Berlin 1	(United Kingdom) Zariba	(Netherlands) Team Illumination	
Cup of Berlin	(Finland) Marigold IceUnity	(United States) Haydenettes	(United States) Crystallettes	
Mozart Cup	(Finland) Marigold IceUnity	(United States) Miami University	(United States) Skyliners	
Leon Lurje Trophy	(Finland) Rockettes	(United States) Haydenettes	(Canada) Les Suprêmes	
French Cup	(Russia) Team Paradise	(Finland) Rockettes	(Finland) Team Unique	
Trophy d'Ecosse	(Canada) NEXXICE	(United States) Team Del Sol	(United Kingdom) Zariba	
Zagreb Snowflakes Trophy	(United States) Skyliners	(Germany) Team Berlin 1	(Hungary) Team Passion	
Spring Cup	(Russia) Tatarstan	(France) Les Zoulous	(Italy) Hot Shivers	
Budapest Cup	(Russia) Team Paradise	(Canada) Les Suprêmes	(Hungary) Team Passion	
Shanghai Trophy	(Competition not held)			
