= 2015–16 synchronized skating season =

- Date: July 1, 2015 – June 30, 2016
- Previous: 2014–15
- Next: 2016–17

The 2015–16 synchronized skating season began on July 1, 2015, and ended on June 30, 2016. During this season, which was concurrent with the season for the other four disciplines (men's single, ladies' single, pair skating and ice dancing), elite synchronized skating teams competed on the International Skating Union (ISU) Championship level at the 2016 World Championships. They also competed at various other international as well as national competitions.

== Competitions ==
The 2015–16 season included the following major competitions.

Key

ISU Championships	Other international	Nationals

Date	Event	Type	Level	Location	Details
2015
October 9–11	Finlandia Trophy	Other int.	Sen.	Espoo, Finland	Details
December 5–6	Dr. Richard Porter Skating Classic	Other int.	Sen., Jun.	Ann Arbor, MI, United States	
2016
January 16–17	Leon Lurje Trophy	Other int.	Sen., Jun., Nov.	Gothenburg, Sweden	
January 22–24	Mozart Cup	Other int.	Sen., Jun., Nov.	Salzburg, Austria	Details
January 30–31	Neuchâtel Trophy	Other int.	Sen., Jun., Nov.	Neuchâtel, Switzerland	
February 5–6	French Cup	Other int.	Sen., Jun., Nov.	Rouen, France	Details
February 12–14	Trophy D'Ecosse	Other int.	Sen., Jun., Nov.	Dumfries, Scotland, United Kingdom	
February 19–21	22nd Spring Cup	Other int.	Sen., Jun., Nov.	Sesto San Giovanni, Italy	
February 25–27	Budapest Cup	Other int.	Sen., Jun., Nov.	Budapest, Hungary	
February 27–28	Finnish Synchronized Skating Championships	Nats.	Sen., Jun., Nov.	Helsinki, Finland	
March 4–6	ISU Shanghai Trophy	Other int.	Sen.	Shanghai, China	
March 11–12	Zagreb Snowflakes Trophy	Other int.	Sen., Nov.	Zagreb, Croatia	
March 11–12	Junior World Challenge Cup	Other int.	Jun.	Zagreb, Croatia	
April 8–9	World Championships	ISU Champ.	Sen.	Budapest, Hungary	
Type: ISU Champ. = ISU Championships; Other int. = International events except ISU Championships; Nats. = National championships; Other nat. = Other national events Levels: Sen. = Senior; Jun. = Junior; Nov. = Novice; TBA = to be announced

== International medalists ==
Championships
Competition	Gold	Silver	Bronze	Results
Worlds	(Russia) Paradise	(Finland) Rockettes	(United States) Haydenettes	
Junior World Challenge Cup	(Canada) Les Suprêmes	(Finland) Team Fintastic	(Russia) Spartak Junost'	
Other senior internationals
Competition	Gold	Silver	Bronze	Results
Finlandia Trophy	(Finland) Rockettes	(Russia) Paradise	(Finland) Marigold IceUnity	
Grand Prix of Figure Skating Final	(Russia) Paradise	(Finland) Rockettes	(Canada) Team Nexxice	
Neuchâtel Trophy	(Russia) Paradise	(Canada) Les Suprêmes	(Finland) Team Unique	
French Cup	(Russia) Paradise	(Finland) Rockettes	(Finland) Team Unique	
Shanghai Trophy	(Russia) Paradise	(United States) Haydenettes	(Sweden) Team Surprise	
