= 2010–11 synchronized skating season =

- Date: July 1, 2010 – June 30, 2011
- Previous: 2009–10
- Next: 2011–12

The 2010–11 synchronized skating season began on July 1, 2010, and ended on June 30, 2011. During this season, which was concurrent with the season for the other four disciplines (men's single, ladies' single, pair skating and ice dancing), elite synchronized skating teams competed on the International Skating Union (ISU) Championship level at the 2011 Senior World Championships and Junior World Challenge Cup. They also competed at various other international as well as national synchronized skating competitions.

== Competitions ==
The 2010–11 season included the following major competitions:

Key

ISU Championships	Other international	Nationals

Date	Event	Type	Level	Location	Details
2011
January 13–15	Cup of Berlin	Other int.	Sen.–Nov.	Berlin, Germany	Details
January 21–23	Mozart Cup	Other int.	Sen.–AN.	Salzburg, Austria	[Details]
February 3–5	French Cup	Other int.	Sen.–Nov.	Rouen, France	Details
February 11–13	17th Spring Cup	Other int.	Sen.–AN.	Sesto San Giovanni, Italy	Details
March 2–5	U.S. Synchronized Skating Championships	Nats.	All	Ontario, California, United States	
March 4–6	Finnish Synchronized Skating Championships	Nats.	Sen.–Nov.	Espoo, Finland	Details
March 2–3	Zagreb Snowflakes Trophy	Other int.	Sen.–Nov.	Zagreb, Croatia	Details
March 10–12	Junior World Challenge Cup	Other int.	Junior	Neuchâtel, Switzerland	
April 9–8	World Championships	ISU Champ.	Senior	Helsinki, Finland	
Type: ISU Champ. = ISU Championships; Other int. = International events except ISU Championships; Nats. = National championships; Other dom. = Other national events Levels: Sen. = Senior; Jun. = Junior; Nov. = Novice; BN. = Basic Novice; AN. = Advanced Novice

== International medalists ==
Championships and major cups
Competition	Gold	Silver	Bronze	Source
World Championships	(Finland) Rockettes	(Finland) Marigold IceUnity	(United States) Haydenettes	
Junior World Challenge Cup	(Finland) Team Fintastic	(Finland) Musketeers	(United States) Team Braemar	
Other senior internationals
Competition	Gold	Silver	Bronze	Source
Cup of Berlin	(Finland) Rockettes	(Germany) Team Berlin 1	(Czech Republic) Olympia	
Mozart Cup	(Finland) Marigold IceUnity	(United States) Haydenettes	(Sweden) Team Boomerang	
French Cup	(Finland) Team Unique	(Canada) Les Suprêmes	(United States) Crystallettes	
17th Spring Cup	(Sweden) Team Surprise	(Russia) Tatarstan	(United States) Miami University	
Zagreb Snowflakes Trophy	(Russia) Paradise	(Czech Republic) Olympia	(Germany) Skating Graces	

== Season's best scores ==
=== Senior teams ===
Rank	Name	Country	Best: Total score	Event	Best: Short program	Event	Best: Free skating	Event
1	Rockettes	(Finland)	215.43	World Championships	74.81	World Championships	140.62	World Championships
2	Marigold IceUnity	(Finland)	213.48	World Championships	73.54	World Championships	139.94	World Championships
3	Team Unique	(Finland)	212.34	French Cup	72.74	French Cup	139.60	French Cup
4	Haydenettes	(United States)	205.40	World Championships	71.16	World Championships	134.24	World Championships
5	Team Surprise	(Sweden)	204.50	World Championships	68.14	World Championships	136.36	World Championships
6	NEXXICE	(Canada)	202.60	World Championships	70.77	World Championships	131.83	World Championships
7	Paradise	(Russia)	186.60	Zagreb Snowflakes Trophy	64.51	World Championships	123.30	Zagreb Snowflakes Trophy
8	Les Suprêmes	(Canada)	186.47	French Cup	62.79	French Cup	123.68	French Cup
9	Tatarstan	(Russia)	176.80	17th Spring Cup	58.85	17th Spring Cup	117.95	17th Spring Cup
10	Crystallettes	(United States)	170.25	French Cup	61.01	French Cup	109.24	French Cup
