= 2012–13 synchronized skating season =

Competitive synchronized skating year from 2012/7/1 to 2013/6/30

- Date: July 1, 2012 – June 30, 2013
- Previous: 2011–12
- Next: 2013–14

The 2012–13 synchronized skating season began on July 1, 2012, and ended on June 30, 2013. During this season, which was concurrent with the season for the other four disciplines (men's single, ladies' single, pair skating and ice dancing), elite synchronized skating teams competed on the International Skating Union (ISU) Championship level at the 2013 World and World Junior Championships. They also competed at various other international as well as national competitions.

== Competitions ==
The 2012–13 season included the following major competitions.

Key

ISU Championships	Other international	Nationals

Date	Event	Type	Level	Location	Details
2012
October 5–7	Finlandia Trophy	Other int.	Senior	Espoo, Finland	Details
November 29 — December 1	Winter Cup	Other int.	Sen., BJ., BN., Juv., Mix.	Lommel, Belgium	Details
December 13–16	French Figure Skating Championships	Nats.	Senior	Strasbourg, France	Details
2013
January 3–5	Mozart Cup	Other int.	Jun., AN., BN., Mix.	Salzburg, Austria	Details
January 12–13	Neuchâtel Trophy	Other int.	Sen., Jun., AN.	Neuchâtel, Switzerland	Details
January 18–19	Cup of Berlin	Other int.	Sen., Jun. Nov., AN., BN.	Berlin, Germany	Details
January 26–27	Leon Lurje Trophy	Other int.	Sen., Jun., Nov.	Gothenburg, Sweden	Details
February 1–2	French Cup	Other int.	Sen., Jun., AN., BN., Ad.	Rouen, France	Details
February 9–10	19th Spring Cup	Other int.	Sen., Jun., AN.	Sesto San Giovanni, Italy	Details
February 21–23	Canadian Synchronized Skating Championships	Nats.	Sen., Jun., Nov., Int., Open	Calgary, Alberta, Canada	Details
February 23–24	Finnish Synchronized Skating Championships	Nats.	Sen., Jun., Nov.	Turku, Finland	Details
February 27 – March 2	U.S. Synchronized Skating Championships	Nats.	Sen., Jun., Nov., Int., Col., Ad.	Plymouth, MI, United States	Details
March 1–2	Zagreb Snowflakes Trophy	Other int.	Sen., Jun., AN., Mix.	Zagreb, Croatia	Details
March 2–3	Swedish Synchronized Skating Championships	Nats.	Sen., Jun., Nov.	Kungsbacka, Sweden	Details
March 8–9	World Junior Championships	ISU Champ.	Junior	Helsinki, Finland	Details
March 14–17	Trophy D'Ecosse	Other int.	Sen., Jun., AN., BN., Juv., Int., Ad.	Dumfries, United Kingdom	Details
April 2–6	World Championships	ISU Champ.	Senior	Boston, MA, United States	Details
Type: ISU Champ. = ISU Championships; Other int. = International events except ISU Championships; Nats. = National championships; Other dom. = Other national events Levels: Sen. = Senior; Jun. = Junior; BJ = B Junior; Nov. = Novice; BN. = Basic Novice; AN. = Advanced Novice; Juv. = Juvenile; Mix. = Mixed Age

== International medalists ==
Championships
Competition	Gold	Silver	Bronze	Results
Worlds	(Finland) Team Unique	(Canada) NEXXICE	(United States) Haydenettes	
Junior Worlds	(Finland) Musketeers	(Finland) Team Fintastic	(Russia) Spartak Junost'	
Other senior internationals
Competition	Gold	Silver	Bronze	Results
Finlandia Trophy	(Finland) Team Unique	(Finland) Rockettes	(Russia) Paradise	
Winter Cup	(Germany) United Angels	(Germany) Skating Graces	(Belgium) Team Temptation	
Neuchâtel Trophy	(France) Ex-L' Ice	(Switzerland) Starlight Team	(no other competitors)	
Cup of Berlin	(Finland) Team Unique	(Finland) Rockettes	(Germany) Team Berlin 1	
Leon Lurje Trophy	(Finland) Marigold IceUnity	(Sweden) Team Surprise	(United States) Miami University	
French Cup	(Finland) Team Unique	(Russia) Paradise	(Finland) Rockettes	
19th Spring Cup	(Sweden) Team Surprise	(Germany) Team Berlin 1	(Italy) Hot Shivers	
Zagreb Snowflakes Trophy	(Russia) Paradise	(Russia) Tatarstan	(Germany) Team Berlin 1	
Trophy D'Ecosse	(United Kingdom) Zariba	(United Kingdom) Team Spirit	(no other competitors)	
Other junior internationals
Competition	Gold	Silver	Bronze	Results
Winter Cup	(Belgium) Team Olympia	(no other competitors)		
Mozart Cup	(Finland) FireBlades	(United Kingdom) Icicles	(Czech Republic) Starlets	
Neuchâtel Trophy	(Finland) Chrystal Dreams	(France) Black Diamonds	(Switzerland) Cool Dreams	
Cup of Berlin	(Finland) Team Fintastic	(Canada) NEXXICE	(Finland) Reflections	
Leon Lurje Trophy	(Sweden) Team Convivium	(Sweden) Team Spirit	(United States) Synchroettes	
French Cup	(Finland) Musketeers	(Finland) Team Mystique	(Sweden) Team Convivium	
19th Spring Cup	(Finland) Ice Steps	(Canada) Les Pirouettes de Laval	(Finland) Valley Bay Synchro	
Zagreb Snowflakes Trophy	(Russia) Idel	(Finland) Les Miracles	(Australia) Majestic Ice	
Trophy D'Ecosse	(United Kingdom) Wight Jewels	(United Kingdom) Solway Stars	(no other competitors)	

== Season's best scores ==
=== Senior teams ===
Rank	Name	Country	Best: Total score	Event	Best: Short program	Event	Best: Free skating	Event
1	Team Unique	(Finland)	214.58	French Cup	74.76	French Cup	139.82	French Cup
2	Paradise	(Russia)	210.47	Zagreb Snowflakes Trophy	74.52	Zagreb Snowflakes Trophy	135.95	Zagreb Snowflakes Trophy
3	NEXXICE	(Canada)	208.25	World Championships	72.84	World Championships	135.41	World Championships
4	Rockettes	(Finland)	203.21	Cup of Berlin	69.66	French Cup	135.54	Cup of Berlin
5	Haydenettes	(United States)	202.53	World Championships	71.87	World Championships	130.66	World Championships
6	Marigold IceUnity	(Finland)	201.00	World Championships	68.48	World Championships	132.52	World Championships
7	Les Suprêmes	(Canada)	193.02	French Cup	67.46	French Cup	130.23	World Championships
8	Team Surprise	(Sweden)	185.82	World Championships	61.94	World Championships	123.88	World Championships
9	Tatarstan	(Russia)	177.78	Zagreb Snowflakes Trophy	60.89	Zagreb Snowflakes Trophy	116.89	Zagreb Snowflakes Trophy
10	Miami University	(United States)	172.01	World Championships	56.38	World Championships	115.63	World Championships

=== Junior teams ===
Rank	Name	Country	Best: Total score	Event	Best: Short program	Event	Best: Free skating	Event
1	Musketeers	(Finland)	183.20	Junior Worlds	61.57	Junior Worlds	121.63	Junior Worlds
2	Team Fintastic	(Finland)	183.00	Junior Worlds	64.32	Junior Worlds	118.68	Junior Worlds
3	Spartak Junost'	(Russia)	171.56	Junior Worlds	55.11	Junior Worlds	116.45	Junior Worlds
4	Team Mystique	(Finland)	152.04	French Cup	51.02	French Cup	101.02	French Cup
5	NEXXICE	(Canada)	149.84	Junior Worlds	54.29	Junior Worlds	95.55	Junior Worlds
6	Les Suprêmes	(Canada)	145.45	Junior Worlds	45.78	Junior Worlds	99.67	Junior Worlds
7	Lexettes	(United States)	144.70	Junior Worlds	47.06	Junior Worlds	97.64	Junior Worlds
8	Skyliners	(United States)	143.69	Junior Worlds	49.65	Junior Worlds	94.04	Junior Worlds
9	Team Convivium	(Sweden)	143.06	French Cup	48.94	French Cup	94.18	Junior Worlds
10	Stella Polaris	(Finland)	137.04	French Cup	50.36	French Cup	86.68	French Cup
