= 2006–07 synchronized skating season =

- Date: July 1, 2006 – June 30, 2007
- Previous: 2005–06
- Next: 2007–08

The 2006–07 synchronized skating season began on July 1, 2006, and ended on June 30, 2007. During this season, which was concurrent with the season for the other four disciplines (men's single, ladies' single, pair skating and ice dancing), elite synchronized skating teams competed on the International Skating Union (ISU) Championship level at the 2007 World Championships and Junior World Challenge Cup. They also competed at various other international as well as national synchronized skating competitions.

== Competitions ==
The 2006–07 season included the following competitions:

Key

ISU Championships	Other international	Nationals

Date	Event	Type	Level	Location	Details
2007
January 20–21	Winter Universiade	Other int.	Sen.	Turin, Italy	Details
January 27–28	Prague Cup	Other int.	Sen., Jun., Nov.	Prague, Czech Republic	Details
February 1–4	French Cup	Other int.	Sen., Jun.	Rouen, France	Details
February 9–11	13th Spring Cup	Other int.	Sen., Jun., Nov.	Sesto San Giovanni, Italy	Details
February 16–17	Neuchâtel Trophy	Other int.	Sen., Jun., Nov.	Neuchâtel, Switzerland	Details
March 8–10	Junior World Challenge Cup	Other int.	Jun.	Nottingham, United Kingdom	Details
March 15–17	Zagreb Snowflakes Trophy	Other int.	Sen., Jun., Nov.	Zagreb, Croatia	Details
March 24–25	Leon Lurje Trophy	Other int.	Nov.	Gothenburg, Sweden	
March 30–31	World Championships	ISU Champ.	Senior	London, ON, Canada	Details
Type: ISU Champ. = ISU Championships; Other int. = International events except ISU Championships; Nats. = National championships; Other dom. = Other national events Levels: Sen. = Senior; Jun. = Junior; Nov. = Novice; Int. = Intermediate; Juv. = Juvenile; Col. = Collegiate; Ad. = Adult; Mas. = Masters

== International medalists ==
Championships and major cups
Competition	Gold	Silver	Bronze	Source
World Championships	(Sweden) Team Surprise	(United States) Miami University	(Canada) NEXXICE	
Junior World Challenge Cup	(Finland) Team Fintastic	(Canada) Les Suprêmes	(United States) Chicago Jazz	
Other senior internationals
Competition	Gold	Silver	Bronze	Source
Winter Universiade	Team Sweden	Team Finland	Team Russia	
Prague Cup	(Finland) Rockettes	(Finland) Team Unique	(United States) Crystallettes	
French Cup	(Finland) Team Unique	(Finland) Rockettes	(Canada) Les Suprêmes	
13th Spring Cup	(Sweden) Team Surprise	(United States) Miami University	(Finland) Marigold IceUnity	
Neuchâtel Trophy	(Russia) Paradise	(Sweden) Team Boomerang	(Switzerland) Starlight Team	
Zagreb Snowflakes Trophy	(Russia) Paradise	(Germany) Team Berlin 1	(United States) Western Michigan University	

== Season's best scores ==
=== Senior teams ===
Rank	Name	Country	Best: total score	Event	Best: short program	Event	Best: free skating	Event
1	Team Surprise	(Sweden)	222.24	World Championships	77.54	World Championships	144.70	World Championships
2	Paradise	(Russia)	201.72	Neuchâtel Trophy	72.88	Zagreb Snowflakes Trophy	130.52	Neuchâtel Trophy
3	Team Unique	(Finland)	198.76	French Cup	68.93	World Championships	130.02	French Cup
4	Miami University	(United States)	198.71	World Championships	69.75	World Championships	128.96	World Championships
5	NEXXICE	(Canada)	194.08	World Championships	68.54	World Championships	125.54	World Championships
6	Haydenettes	(United States)	193.36	World Championships	67.71	World Championships	125.65	World Championships
7	Rockettes	(Finland)	192.38	French Cup	65.76	French Cup	126.62	French Cup
8	Les Suprêmes	(Canada)	189.68	World Championships	66.38	World Championships	123.30	World Championships
9	Marigold IceUnity	(Finland)	187.42	World Championships	66.02	French Cup	126.67	World Championships
10	Team Berlin 1	(Germany)	176.36	Zagreb Snowflakes Trophy	62.95	Zagreb Snowflakes Trophy	113.41	Zagreb Snowflakes Trophy
