= 2009–10 synchronized skating season =

- Date: July 1, 2009 – June 30, 2010
- Previous: 2008–09
- Next: 2010–11

The 2009–10 synchronized skating season began on July 1, 2009, and ended on June 30, 2010. During this season, which was concurrent with the season for the other four disciplines (men's single, ladies' single, pair skating and ice dancing), elite synchronized skating teams competed on the International Skating Union (ISU) Championship level at the 2010 Senior World Championships and Junior World Challenge Cup. They also competed at various other international as well as national synchronized skating competitions.

== Competitions ==
The 2009–10 season included the following competitions:

Key

ISU Championships	Other international	Nationals

Date	Event	Type	Level	Location	Details
2010
January 7–10	Kangus Cup	Other int.	Jun., Nov.	Toruń, Poland	
January 14–17	Cup of Berlin	Other int.	Sen., Jun., Nov.	Berlin, Germany	Details
January 27–30	Prague Cup	Other int.	Sen., Jun., Nov.	Prague, Czech Republic	Details
January 29–31	Finlandia Cup	Other int.	Sen., Jun., Nov.	Helsinki, Finland	Details
February 5–6	French Cup	Other int.	Sen., Jun., Nov.	Rouen, France	Details
February 12–14	16th Spring Cup	Other int.	Sen., Jun., Nov.	Sesto San Giovanni, Italy	Details
February 19–20	Neuchâtel Trophy	Other int.	Sen., Jun., Nov.	Neuchâtel, Switzerland	Details
February 26–28	Finnish Synchronized Skating Championships	Nats.	Sen., Jun., Nov.	Espoo, Finland	Details
March 2–6	U.S. Synchronized Skating Championships	Nats.	All	Minneapolis, Minnesota, United States	Details
March 4–6	Zagreb Snowflakes Trophy	Other int.	Sen., Jun., Nov.	Zagreb, Croatia	
March 4–6	Canadian Synchronized Skating Championships	Nats.	Sen., Jun., Int., Nov., Open	Brompton, QC, Canada	Details
March 11–13	Junior World Challenge Cup	Other int.	Junior	Gothenburg, Sweden	
March 19–21	Leon Lurje Trophy	Other int.	Nov.	Borås, Sweden	
April 9–10	World Championships	ISU Champ.	Senior	Colorado Springs, CO, United States	Details
Type: ISU Champ. = ISU Championships; Other int. = International events except ISU Championships; Nats. = National championships; Other dom. = Other national events Levels: Sen. = Senior; Jun. = Junior; Nov. = Novice; Pre-N. = Pre-Novice ; BN. = Basic Novice; AN. = Advanced Novice

== International medalists ==
Championships and major cups
Competition	Gold	Silver	Bronze	Source
World Championships	(Finland) Rockettes	(Finland) Marigold IceUnity	(United States) Haydenettes	
Junior World Challenge Cup	(Finland) Team Fintastic	(Canada) NEXXICE	(Finland) Musketeers	
Other senior internationals
Competition	Gold	Silver	Bronze	Source
Cup of Berlin	(Finland) Rockettes	(Finland) Marigold IceUnity	(United States) Haydenettes	
Finlandia Cup	(Finland) Marigold IceUnity	(Finland) Rockettes	(Finland) Team Unique	
Prague Cup	(United States) Crystallettes	(Czech Republic) Olympia	(Switzerland) Team Dancers	
French Cup	(Finland) Marigold IceUnity	(Finland) Team Unique	(Canada) NEXXICE	
16th Spring Cup	(Canada) black ice	(Germany) Team Berlin 1	(Russia) Dream Tream	
Neuchâtel Trophy	(Sweden) Team Surprise	(United States) Miami University	(Sweden) Team Boomerang	
Zagreb Snowflakes Trophy	(Germany) Team Berlin 1	(Russia) Tatarstan	(Czech Republic) Olympia	

== Season's best scores ==
=== Senior teams ===
Rank	Name	Country	Best: Total score	Event	Best: Short program	Event	Best: Free skating	Event
1	Rockettes	(Finland)	223.90	World Championships	83.46	Cup of Berlin	142.50	World Championships
2	Marigold IceUnity	(Finland)	217.96	Finlandia Cup	77.63	Finlandia Cup	141.64	World Championships
3	Haydenettes	(United States)	216.48	World Championships	78.62	World Championships	137.86	World Championships
4	black ice	(Canada)	210.90	World Championships	76.26	World Championships	134.64	World Championships
5	NEXXICE	(Canada)	209.78	World Championships	74.58	French Cup	136.24	World Championships
6	Team Unique	(Finland)	207.71	Finlandia Cup	78.66	French Cup	138.11	Finlandia Cup
7	Team Surprise	(Sweden)	200.90	World Championships	75.74	World Championships	125.16	World Championships
8	Paradise	(Russia)	192.98	French Cup	69.46	World Championships	126.14	French Cup
9	Team Berlin 1	(Germany)	190.28	Zagreb Snowflakes Trophy	69.09	Cup of Berlin	113.58	World Championships
10	Les Suprêmes	(Canada)	184.94	French Cup	70.82	French Cup	114.12	French Cup
