= 2007–08 synchronized skating season =

Skating season

- Date: July 1, 2007 – June 30, 2008
- Previous: 2006–07
- Next: 2008–09

The 2007–08 synchronized skating season began on July 1, 2007, and ended on June 30, 2008. During this season, which was concurrent with the season for the other four disciplines (men's single, ladies' single, pair skating and ice dancing), elite synchronized skating teams competed on the International Skating Union (ISU) Championship level at the 2008 World Championships and Junior World Challenge Cup. They also competed at various other international as well as national synchronized skating competitions.

== Competitions ==
The 2007–08 season included the following competitions:

Key

ISU Championships	Other international	Nationals

Date	Event	Type	Level	Location	Details
2008
January 19–20	Cup of Berlin	Other int.	Sen., Jun., Nov.	Berlin, Germany	Details
January 25–26	Prague Cup	Other int.	Sen., Jun., Nov.	Prague, Czech Republic	Details
February 1–3	French Cup	Other int.	Sen., Jun., Nov.	Rouen, France	Details
February 13–14	14th Spring Cup	Other int.	Sen., Jun., Nov.	Sesto San Giovanni, Italy	Details
February 13–14	Neuchâtel Trophy	Other int.	Sen., Jun., Nov.	Neuchâtel, Switzerland	Details
February 22–24	Finnish Synchronized Skating Championships	Nats.	Sen., Jun.	Helsinki, Finland	Details
March 13–15	Leon Lurje Trophy	Other int.	Nov.	Gothenburg, Sweden	Details
March 13–15	Zagreb Snowflakes Trophy	Other int.	Sen., Jun., Nov.	Zagreb, Croatia	Details
March 28–30	World Championships	ISU Champ.	Senior	Budapest, Hungary	Details
Type: ISU Champ. = ISU Championships; Other int. = International events except ISU Championships; Nats. = National championships; Other dom. = Other national events Levels: Sen. = Senior; Jun. = Junior; Nov. = Novice; Int. = Intermediate; Juv. = Juvenile; Col. = Collegiate; Ad. = Adult; Mas. = Masters

== International medalists ==
Championships and major cups
Competition	Gold	Silver	Bronze	Source
World Championships	(Finland) Rockettes	(Sweden) Team Surprise	(Canada) NEXXICE	
Junior World Challenge Cup	(Finland) Team Fintastic	(Canada) Gold Ice	(Finland) Musketeers	
Other senior internationals
Competition	Gold	Silver	Bronze	Source
Cup of Berlin	(Finland) Rockettes	(Sweden) Team Surprise	(Finland) Marigold IceUnity	
Prague Cup	(Finland) Rockettes	(Russia) Paradise	(United States) Crystallettes	
French Cup	(Finland) Marigold IceUnity	(Finland) Team Unique	(United States) Miami University	
14th Spring Cup	(Canada) NEXXICE	(Canada) Les Suprêmes	(Russia) Tatarstan	
Neuchâtel Trophy	(Sweden) Team Surprise	(Sweden) Team Boomerang	(Switzerland) Starlight Team	
Zagreb Snowflakes Trophy	(Russia) Paradise	(Germany) Team Berlin 1	(Germany) Magic Diamonds	

== Season's best scores ==
=== Senior teams ===
Rank	Name	Country	Best: Total score	Event	Best: Short program	Event	Best: Free skating	Event
1	Marigold IceUnity	(Finland)	212.58	French Cup	75.34	French Cup	137.24	French Cup
2	Rockettes	(Finland)	210.68	Cup of Berlin	74.44	Prague Cup	137.93	World Championships
3	Team Unique	(Finland)	209.15	French Cup	73.76	French Cup	135.39	French Cup
4	Team Surprise	(Sweden)	205.71	World Championships	77.79	Cup of Berlin	130.99	World Championships
5	NEXXICE	(Canada)	198.81	World Championships	70.67	World Championships	128.14	World Championships
6	Haydenettes	(United States)	197.47	Cup of Berlin	70.88	Cup of Berlin	129.05	World Championships
7	Paradise	(Russia)	195.22	Prague Cup	70.34	Prague Cup	124.88	Prague Cup
8	Les Suprêmes	(Canada)	188.59	World Championships	67.55	World Championships	121.04	World Championships
9	Miami University	(United States)	184.88	French Cup	70.90	French Cup	113.98	French Cup
10	Team Berlin 1	(Germany)	183.31	Cup of Berlin	66.55	Cup of Berlin	116.76	Cup of Berlin
