= Cup of Berlin =

Synchronized skating competition

The Cup of Berlin is an international, multi-level synchronized skating competition that has been held in Berlin, Germany since 2005 (except in 2007, 2009, 2012, 2014, 2016 and 2019) and attracted the world's best teams. It is organized by Deutsche Eislauf-Union and sanctioned by the International Skating Union.

== Medalists ==
=== Senior teams ===
Year	Gold	Total	SP	FS	Silver	Total	SP	FS	Bronze	Total	SP	FS	Source(s)
2005	(Finland) Rockettes	2.0	1.0	1.0	(Germany) Team Berlin 1	3.5	1.5	2.0	(Finland) Team Unique	3.5	0.5	3.0	
2006	(Finland) Rockettes	139.43	49.10	90.33	(Germany) Team Berlin 1	136.74	50.27	86.47	(Canada) Les Suprêmes	124.18	38.82	85.36	
2007	(competition not held)												
2008	(Finland) Rockettes	210.68	74.41	136.27	(Sweden) Team Surprise	202.32	77.79	124.53	(Finland) Marigold IceUnity	201.76	71.93	129.83	
2009	(competition not held)												
2010	(Finland) Rockettes	218.10	83.46	134.64	(Finland) Marigold IceUnity	204.19	76.38	127.81	(United States) Haydenettes	202.36	77.97	124.39	
2011	(Finland) Rockettes	189.78	64.39	125.39	(Germany) Team Berlin 1	152.64	53.18	99.46	(Czech Republic) Team Olympia	145.53	47.97	97.56	
2012	(competition not held)												
2013	(Finland) Team Unique	206.44	71.30	135.14	(Finland) Rockettes	203.21	67.67	135.54	(Germany) Team Berlin 1	151.83	49.95	101.88	
2014	(competition not held)												
2015	(Finland) Marigold IceUnity	203.46	69.08	134.38	(Finland) Team Unique	191.94	66.21	125.73	(Germany) Team Berlin 1	161.03	55.83	105.20	
2016	(competition not held)												
2017	(Finland) Marigold IceUnity	195.11	67.07	128.04	(United States) Haydenettes	188.08	63.30	124.78	(United States) Crystallettes	166.70	58.22	108.48	
2018	(United States) Skyliners Synchronized Skating Team	180.74	67.14	113.60	(Germany) Team Berlin 1	165.28	55.48	109.80	(United States) Miami University Synchronized Skating Team	162.32	55.95	106.37	
2019	(competition not held)												
2020	(competition not held)												
