= 2005–06 synchronized skating season =

- Date: July 1, 2005 – June 30, 2006
- Previous: 2004–05
- Next: 2006–07

The 2005–06 synchronized skating season began on July 1, 2005, and ended on June 30, 2006. During this season, which was concurrent with the season for the other four disciplines (men's single, ladies' single, pair skating and ice dancing), elite synchronized skating teams competed on the International Skating Union (ISU) Championship level at the 2006 World Championships and Junior World Challenge Cup. They also competed at various other international as well as national synchronized skating competitions.

== Competitions ==
The 2005–06 season included the following competitions:

Key

ISU Championships	Other international	Nationals

Date	Event	Type	Level	Location	Details
2006
January 13–14	Cup of Berlin	Other int.	Sen.	Berlin, Germany	Details
February 2–5	French Cup	Other int.	Sen., Jun.	Rouen, France	Details
February 9–12	12th Spring Cup	Other int.	Sen., Jun.	Sesto San Giovanni, Italy	Details
March	Junior World Challenge Cup	Other int.	Junior	Helsinki, Finland	
March 16–18	Zagreb Snowflakes Trophy	Other int.	Sen., Jun., Nov.	Zagreb, Croatia	Details
March 30 — April 1	World Championships	ISU Champ.	Senior	Prague, Czech Republic	Details
Type: ISU Champ. = ISU Championships; Other int. = International events except ISU Championships; Nats. = National championships; Other dom. = Other national events Levels: Sen. = Senior; Jun. = Junior; Nov. = Novice; Int. = Intermediate; Juv. = Juvenile; Col. = Collegiate; Ad. = Adult; Mas. = Masters

== International medalists ==
Championships and major cups
Competition	Gold	Silver	Bronze	Source
World Championships	(Finland) Marigold IceUnity	(Sweden) Team Surprise	(Finland) Rockettes	
Junior World Challenge Cup	(Finland) Musketeers	(Finland) Team Fintastic	(United States) Chicago Jazz	
Other senior internationals
Competition	Gold	Silver	Bronze	Source
Cup of Berlin	(Finland) Rockettes	(Germany) Team Berlin 1	(Canada) Les Suprêmes	
French Cup	(Sweden) Team Surprise	(Finland) Marigold IceUnity	(Finland) Team Unique	
12th Spring Cup	(Germany) Team Berlin 1	(United States) Miami University	(Canada) NEXXICE	
Zagreb Snowflakes Trophy	(Russia) Paradise	(United States) Western Michigan University	(Switzerland) Starlight Team	

== Season's best scores ==
=== Senior teams ===
Rank	Name	Country	Best: total score	Event	Best: short program	Event	Best: free skating	Event
1	Marigold IceUnity	(Finland)	197.29	World Championships	69.89	World Championships	127.40	World Championships
2	Team Surprise	(Sweden)	188.57	World Championships	69.09	World Championships	119.48	World Championships
3	Rockettes	(Finland)	180.32	World Championships	62.66	World Championships	117.66	World Championships
4	Miami University	(United States)	178.79	World Championships	63.31	World Championships	115.48	World Championships
5	Paradise	(Russia)	174.76	World Championships	60.53	World Championships	114.23	World Championships
6	black ice	(Canada)	173.95	World Championships	63.47	World Championships	110.48	World Championships
7	Haydenettes	(United States)	171.35	World Championships	62.78	World Championships	108.57	World Championships
8	Team Berlin 1	(Germany)	161.25	World Championships	61.34	World Championships	100.79	12th Spring Cup
9	NEXXICE	(Canada)	154.52	World Championships	58.02	12th Spring Cup	100.76	World Championships
10	Team Unique	(Finland)	144.71	French Cup	47.96	French Cup	96.75	French Cup
