= 2013–14 synchronized skating season =

- Date: July 1, 2013 – June 30, 2014
- Previous: 2012–13
- Next: 2014–15

The 2013–14 synchronized skating season began on July 1, 2013 and ended on June 30, 2014. During this season, which was concurrent with the season for the other four disciplines (men's single, ladies' single, pair skating and ice dancing), elite synchronized skating teams competed on the International Skating Union (ISU) Championship level at the 2014 World Championships. They also competed at various other international as well as national competitions.

== Competitions ==
The 2013–14 season included the following major competitions.

Key

| ISU Championships | Other international | Nationals |

| Date | Event | Type | Level | Location | Details |
|---|---|---|---|---|---|
2013
| October 4–6 | Finlandia Trophy | Other int. | Sen. | Espoo, Finland | Details |
| November 29–30 | Winter Cup | Other int. | Sen., Jun., Nov. | Gullegem, Belgium | Details |
| December 12–15 | French Figure Skating Championships | Nats. | Sen. | Vaujany, France | Details |
2014
| January 18–19 | Leon Lurje Trophy | Other int. | Sen., Jun., Nov. | Gothenburg, Sweden | Details |
| January 24–26 | Mozart Cup | Other int. | Sen., Jun., Nov. | Salzburg, Austria | Details |
| January 31 — February 1 | French Cup | Other int. | Sen., Jun., Nov. | Rouen, France | Details |
| February 14–16 | 20th Spring Cup | Other int. | Sen., Jun., AN. | Sesto San Giovanni, Italy | Details |
| February 21–23 | Canadian Synchronized Skating Championships | Nats. | Sen., Jun., Nov., Int., Open | Burnaby, BC, Canada | Details |
| February 22–23 | Finnish Synchronized Skating Championships | Nats. | Sen., Jun., Nov. | Helsinki, Finland | Details |
| February 22–23 | Swedish Synchronized Skating Championships | Nats. | Sen., Jun. | Mölndal, Sweden | Details |
| February 26 — March 1 | U.S. Synchronized Skating Championships | Nats. | Sen., Jun., Nov., Int., Col., Ad. | Colorado Springs, CO, United States | Details |
| February 27 — March 1 | Zagreb Snowflakes Trophy | Other int. | Sen., Jun., Nov. | Zagreb, Croatia | Details |
| March 6–8 | Neuchâtel Trophy | Other int. | Sen. | Neuchâtel, Switzerland | Details |
| March 6–8 | Junior World Challenge Cup | Other int. | Jun. | Neuchâtel, Switzerland | Details |
| March 13–16 | Trophy D'Ecosse | Other int. | Sen., Jun., Nov. | Dumfries, Scotland, United Kingdom | Details |
| April 4–5 | World Championships | ISU Champ. | Sen. | Courmayeur, Italy | Details |
Type: ISU Champ. = ISU Championships; Other int. = International events except ISU Championships; Nats. = National championships; Other nat. = Other national events Levels: Sen. = Senior; Jun. = Junior; BJ = B Junior; Nov. = Novice; BN. = Basic Novice; AN. = Advanced Novice; Int. = Intermediate; Juv. = Juvenile; Ad. = Adult; Mix. = Mixed Age; Col. = Collegiate

=== Cancelled competitions ===
Key

| ISU Championships | Other international | Nationals |

| Date | Event | Type | Level | Location | Details |
|---|---|---|---|---|---|
2013
| December 10–12 | Winter Universiade | Other int. | Sen. | Trento, Italy | |
2014
| January 8–12 | Toruń Cup | Other int. | Jun., Nov. | Toruń, Poland | |
| March 21–23 | Jégvirág Cup | Other int. | Sen., Jun., Nov. | Miskolc, Hungary | |
Type: ISU Champ. = ISU Championships; Other int. = International events except ISU Championships; Nats. = National championships; Other nat. = Other national events Levels: Sen. = Senior; Jun. = Junior; Nov. = Novice

== International medalists ==
Championships
| Competition | Gold | Silver | Bronze | Results |
|---|---|---|---|---|
| Worlds | (Finland) Marigold IceUnity | (Canada) NEXXICE | (Finland) Rockettes | |
| Junior World Challenge Cup | (Finland) Team Fintastic | (Canada) Les Suprêmes | (Finland) Musketeers | |
Other senior internationals
| Competition | Gold | Silver | Bronze | Results |
| Finlandia Trophy | (Finland) Team Unique | (Russia) Paradise | (Finland) Marigold IceUnity | |
| Winter Cup | (Germany) Skating Graces | (United Kingdom) Team Spirit | (Belgium) Team Temptation | |
| Leon Lurje Trophy | (Finland) Team Unique | (Sweden) Team Surprise | (Sweden) Team Boomerang | |
| Mozart Cup | (Finland) Marigold IceUnity | (Finland) Rockettes | (Canada) NEXXICE | |
| French Cup | (Finland) Team Unique | (Finland) Rockettes | (Finland) Marigold IceUnity | |
| 20th Spring Cup | (Sweden) Team Surprise | (Italy) Hot Shivers | (United States) Starlights | |
| Zagreb Snowflakes Trophy | (Russia) Paradise | (Russia) Tatarstan | (Croatia) Zagreb Snowflakes | |
| Neuchâtel Trophy | (Russia) Paradise | (Sweden) Team Surprise | (Germany) Team Berlin 1 | |
| Trophy D'Ecosse | (United Kingdom) Zariba | (United Kingdom) Moray Dolphins | (no other competitors) | |
Other junior internationals
| Competition | Gold | Silver | Bronze | Source |
| Winter Cup | (Finland) Reflections | (France) Black Diam's | (United Kingdom) Icicles | |
| Leon Lurje Trophy | (Sweden) Team Convivium | (United States) Synchroettes | (Sweden) Team Spirit | |
| Mozart Cup | (Canada) Les Pirouettes | (Russia) Crystal Ice | (Finland) Sun City Swing | |
| French Cup | (Finland) Team Fintastic | (Finland) Team Mystique | (Canada) Les Suprêmes | |
| 20th Spring Cup | (Finland) Valley Bay Synchro | (United States) Team Braemar | (Sweden) Team Spirit | |
| Zagreb Snowflakes Trophy | (Finland) Dream Edges | (Germany) Starlets | (Croatia) Zagreb Snowflakes | |
| Trophy D'Ecosse | (France) Cometes | (United Kingdom) Wight Jewels | (no other competitors) | |

== Season's best scores ==
=== Senior teams ===
| Rank | Name | Country | Best: Total score | Event | Best: Short program | Event | Best: Free skating | Event |
|---|---|---|---|---|---|---|---|---|
| 1 | Marigold IceUnity | (Finland) | 223.45 | World Championships | 76.14 | World Championships | 147.31 | World Championships |
| 2 | NEXXICE | (Canada) | 220.88 | World Championships | 74.85 | World Championships | 146.03 | World Championships |
| 3 | Rockettes | (Finland) | 220.66 | World Championships | 74.98 | World Championships | 145.68 | World Championships |
| 4 | Paradise | (Russia) | 220.54 | Zagreb Snowflakes Trophy | 74.70 | Zagreb Snowflakes Trophy | 145.84 | Zagreb Snowflakes Trophy |
| 5 | Team Unique | (Finland) | 215.30 | French Cup | 75.46 | French Cup | 139.84 | French Cup |
| 6 | Team Surprise | (Sweden) | 204.20 | World Championships | 68.46 | World Championships | 135.74 | World Championships |
| 7 | Les Suprêmes | (Canada) | 197.01 | World Championships | 63.63 | World Championships | 133.38 | World Championships |
| 8 | Haydenettes | (United States) | 196.90 | World Championships | 68.66 | World Championships | 128.24 | World Championships |
| 9 | Tatarstan | (Russia) | 190.18 | Zagreb Snowflakes Trophy | 66.46 | Zagreb Snowflakes Trophy | 123.72 | Zagreb Snowflakes Trophy |
| 10 | Team Boomerang | (Sweden) | 172.19 | Leon Lurje Trophy | 61.31 | World Championships | 114.87 | Leon Lurje Trophy |

=== Junior teams ===
| Rank | Name | Country | Best: Total score | Event | Best: Short program | Event | Best: Free skating | Event |
|---|---|---|---|---|---|---|---|---|
| 1 | Team Fintastic | (Finland) | 173.77 | Junior World Challenge Cup | 56.96 | Junior World Challenge Cup | 116.81 | Junior World Challenge Cup |
| 2 | Les Suprêmes | (Canada) | 170.89 | Junior World Challenge Cup | 55.41 | French Cup | 116.18 | Junior World Challenge Cup |
| 3 | Team Mystique | (Finland) | 167.95 | French Cup | 57.92 | French Cup | 110.03 | French Cup |
| 4 | Musketeers | (Finland) | 167.63 | Junior World Challenge Cup | 56.53 | French Cup | 113.10 | Junior World Challenge Cup |
| 5 | Team Convivium | (Sweden) | 157.86 | Junior World Challenge Cup | 52.87 | Leon Lurje Trophy | 109.00 | Junior World Challenge Cup |
| 6 | Les Pirouettes | (Canada) | 155.37 | Junior World Challenge Cup | 56.32 | Mozart Cup | 103.42 | Junior World Challenge Cup |
| 7 | Valley Bay Synchro | (Finland) | 153.26 | 20th Spring Cup | 51.88 | 20th Spring Cup | 101.38 | 20th Spring Cup |
| 8 | Spartak Junost' | (Russia) | 149.63 | Junior World Challenge Cup | 55.17 | Junior World Challenge Cup | 94.46 | Junior World Challenge Cup |
| 9 | Stella Polaris | (Finland) | 147.62 | French Cup | 49.65 | French Cup | 97.97 | French Cup |
| 10 | Crystal Ice | (Russia) | 145.36 | Mozart Cup | 53.18 | Mozart Cup | 92.18 | Mozart Cup |
