= 2011–12 synchronized skating season =

- Date: July 1, 2011 – June 30, 2012
- Previous: 2010–11
- Next: 2012–13

The 2011–12 synchronized skating season began on July 1, 2011, and ended on June 30, 2012. During this season, which was concurrent with the season for the other four disciplines (men's single, ladies' single, pair skating and ice dancing), elite synchronized skating teams competed on the International Skating Union (ISU) Championship level at the 2012 Senior World Championships and Junior World Challenge Cup. They also competed at various other international as well as national synchronized skating competitions.

== Competitions ==
The 2011–12 season included the following major competitions.

Key

ISU Championships	Other international	Nationals

Date	Event	Type	Level	Location	Details
2011
December 9–10	Winter Cup	Other int.	Sen., Mix., BN., Juv., Ad.	Gullegem, Belgium	Details
December 16–18	French Figure Skating Championships	Nats.	Sen., Jun., Nov.	Dammarie-lès-Lys, France	
2012
January 27–29	Mozart Cup	Other int.	Sen., Jun. AN.	Salzburg, Austria	Details
February 3–5	French Cup	Other int.	Sen., Jun., Nov.	Rouen, France	Details
February 9–11	Neuchâtel Trophy	Other int.	Sen., Jun., Nov.	Neuchâtel, Switzerland	
February 17–19	18th Spring Cup	Other int.	Sen., Jun., Nov.	Sesto San Giovanni, Italy	Details
February 24–26	Finnish Synchronized Skating Championships	Nats.	Sen., Jun., Nov.	Espoo, Finland	Details
February 29 — March 3	U.S. Synchronized Skating Championships	Nats.	All	Worcester, Massachusetts, United States	Details
March 2–3	Zagreb Snowflakes Trophy	Other int.	Sen., Jun., Nov.	Zagreb, Croatia	
March 16–17	Junior World Challenge Cup	Other int.	Junior	Gothenburg, Sweden	
March 17–18	Leon Lurje Trophy	Other int.	Sen., Jun., Nov.	Gothenburg, Sweden	
April 6–8	Trophy D'Ecosse	Other int.	Sen., Jun., Nov.	Dumfries, United Kingdom	
April 13–14	World Championships	ISU Champ.	Senior	Gothenburg, Sweden	
Type: ISU Champ. = ISU Championships; Other int. = International events except ISU Championships; Nats. = National championships; Other dom. = Other national events Levels: Sen. = Senior; Jun. = Junior; Int. = Intermediate; Nov. = Novice; BN. = Basic Novice; AN. = Advanced Novice; Ad. = Adult; Col. = Collegiate

== International medalists ==
Championships and major cups
Competition	Gold	Silver	Bronze	Source
World Championships	(Sweden) Team Surprise	(Canada) NEXXICE	(United States) Haydenettes	
Junior World Challenge Cup	(Finland) Team Fintastic	(Finland) Musketeers	(Canada) Les Suprêmes	
Other senior internationals
Competition	Gold	Silver	Bronze	Source
Winter Cup	(Belgium) Team Temptation	(United Kingdom) Team Spirit	(no other competitors)	
Mozart Cup	(Finland) Marigold IceUnity	(Finland) Rockettes	(Canada) NEXXICE	
French Cup	(Finland) Team Unique	(Finland) Marigold IceUnity	(Russia) Paradise	
Neuchâtel Trophy	(United States) Crystallettes	(United States) Haydenettes	(Germany) United Angels	
18th Spring Cup	(Sweden) Team Surprise	(Russia) Tatarstan	(Sweden) Team Boomerang	
Zagreb Snowflakes Trophy	(Russia) Paradise	(Germany) Team Berlin 1	(Germany) Skating Graces	
Leon Lurje Trophy				
Trophy D'Ecosse				

== Season's best scores ==
=== Senior teams ===
Rank	Name	Country	Best: Total score	Event	Best: Short program	Event	Best: Free skating	Event
1	Team Surprise	(Sweden)	194.87	World Championships	64.63	World Championships	130.24	World Championships
2	NEXXICE	(Canada)	193.64	World Championships	63.76	World Championships	129.88	World Championships
3	Haydenettes	(United States)	192.78	World Championships	62.14	World Championships	130.64	World Championships
4	Rockettes	(Finland)	192.75	World Championships	63.09	Mozart Cup	131.73	World Championships
5	Paradise	(Russia)	192.25	World Championships	65.07	World Championships	127.18	World Championships
6	Marigold IceUnity	(Finland)	187.68	Mozart Cup	63.38	French Cup	126.05	Mozart Cup
7	Team Unique	(Finland)	183.92	French Cup	62.91	Mozart Cup	121.76	French Cup
8	Tatarstan	(Russia)	179.13	18th Spring Cup	58.09	18th Spring Cup	121.04	18th Spring Cup
9	Les Suprêmes	(Canada)	177.50	World Championships	58.51	World Championships	118.99	World Championships
10	Team Boomerang	(Sweden)	173.44	World Championships	57.65	World Championships	115.79	World Championships
