= 2008–09 synchronized skating season =

- Date: July 1, 2008 – June 30, 2009
- Previous: 2007–08
- Next: 2009–10

The 2008–09 synchronized skating season began on July 1, 2008, and ended on June 30, 2009. During this season, which was concurrent with the season for the other four disciplines (men's single, ladies' single, pair skating and ice dancing), elite synchronized skating teams competed on the International Skating Union (ISU) Championship level at the 2009 World Championships and Junior World Challenge Cup. They also competed at various other international as well as national synchronized skating competitions.

== Competitions ==
The 2008–09 season included the following competitions:

Key

ISU Championships	Other international	Nationals

Date	Event	Type	Level	Location	Details
2008
December 19–21	French Figure Skating Championships	Nats.	Sen., Jun.	Colmar, France	Details
2009
January 30 — February 1	Prague Cup	Other int.	Sen., Jun.	Prague, Czech Republic	Details
February 6–8	French Cup	Other int.	Sen., Jun.	Rouen, France	
February 13–14	15th Spring Cup	Other int.	Sen., Jun.	Sesto San Giovanni, Italy	Details
February 20–22	Jegvirag Cup	Other int.	Sen., Jun.	Miskolc, Hungary	Details
February 21–25	24th Winter Universiade	Other int.	Senior	Harbin, China	Details
February 26 — March 1	Canadian Synchronized Skating Championships	Nats.	Sen.	Oshawa, Ontario, Canada	Details
March 3–7	U.S. Synchronized Skating Championships	Nats.	All	Portland, Maine, United States	Details
March 6–7	Finnish Synchronized Skating Championships	Nats.	Sen., Jun.	Helsinki, Finland	Details
March 12–14	Junior World Challenge Cup	Other int.	Junior	Neuchâtel, Switzerland	Details
March 20–22	Leon Lurje Trophy	Other int.	Novice	Gothenburg, Sweden	
April 1–4	World Championships	ISU Champ.	Senior	Zagreb, Croatia	Details
Type: ISU Champ. = ISU Championships; Other int. = International events except ISU Championships; Nats. = National championships; Other dom. = Other national events Levels: Sen. = Senior; Jun. = Junior; Nov. = Novice; Int. = Intermediate; Juv. = Juvenile; Col. = Collegiate; Ad. = Adult; Mas. = Masters

== International medalists ==
Championships and major cups
Competition	Gold	Silver	Bronze	Source
World Championships	(Canada) NEXXICE	(Finland) Team Unique	(Sweden) Team Surprise	
Junior World Challenge Cup	(Finland) Team Fintastic	(Canada) NEXXICE	(Finland) Musketeers	
Other senior internationals
Competition	Gold	Silver	Bronze	Source
Prague Cup	(Finland) Marigold IceUnity	(Finland) Team Unique	(Sweden) Team Surprise	
French Cup	(Finland) Team Unique	(Finland) Rockettes	(United States) Haydenettes	
15th Spring Cup	(Germany) Team Berlin 1	(United States) California Gold	(Sweden) Team Boomerang	
Jegvirag Cup	(United States) Western Michigan University	(Hungary) Passion	(Sweden) Seaside	
24th Winter Universiade	(Sweden) Team Surprise	(Finland) Rockettes	(Russia) Paradise	

== Season's best scores ==
=== Senior teams ===
Rank	Name	Country	Best: Total score	Event	Best: Short program	Event	Best: Free skating	Event
1	NEXXICE	(Canada)	223.58	World Championships	80.12	World Championships	143.46	World Championships
2	Team Unique	(Finland)	220.28	World Championships	82.36	World Championships	137.92	World Championships
3	Team Surprise	(Sweden)	209.30	World Championships	78.24	World Championships	132.18	24th Winter Universiade
4	Haydenettes	(United States)	207.40	World Championships	77.10	World Championships	130.30	World Championships
5	Rockettes	(Finland)	205.05	French Cup	72.13	French Cup	132.92	French Cup
6	Marigold IceUnity	(Finland)	204.08	Prague Cup	78.68	World Championships	129.46	Prague Cup
7	black ice	(Canada)	201.10	World Championships	73.92	World Championships	127.18	World Championships
8	Paradise	(Russia)	197.66	Prague Cup	73.82	Prague Cup	123.84	Prague Cup
9	Miami University	(United States)	188.42	World Championships	71.62	World Championships	116.80	Prague Cup; World Championships
10	Team Berlin 1	(Germany)	182.26	World Championships	68.84	World Championships	113.66	15th Spring Cup
