= ISU World Junior Synchronized Skating Championships =

Annual synchronized skating competition

The ISU World Junior Synchronized Skating Championships (WJSSC) are the junior world championships for the sport of synchronized skating. Held first time in 2013 and originally planned to be held biennially, the WJSSC is now an annual event sanctioned by the International Skating Union.

== Medalists ==
Medalists
Year	Location	Gold	Total	SP	FS	Silver	Total	SP	FS	Bronze	Total	SP	FS	Source(s)
2013	Helsinki, Finland	(Finland) Musketeers	183.20	61.57	121.63	(Finland) Team Fintastic	183.00	64.32	118.68	(Russia) Spartak Junost'	171.56	55.11	116.45	
2014	(not held, see the article for the Junior World Challenge Cup)													
2015	Zagreb, Croatia	(Finland) Musketeers	172.98	59.08	113.90	(Finland) Team Fintastic	166.73	60.95	105.78	(Canada) Les Suprêmes	162.09	54.99	107.10	
2016	(not held, see the article for the Junior World Challenge Cup)													
2017	Mississauga, Canada	(Russia) Spartak Junost	168.83	62.34	106.49	(Finland) Team Fintastic	158.06	61.55	96.51	(Finland) Musketeers	156.24	57.72	98.52	
2018	Zagreb, Croatia	(Russia) Spartak Junost	174.58	68.50	106.08	(United States) Team Skyliners	169.82	65.15	104.67	(Russia) Team Crystal Ice	167.14	63.33	103.81	
2019	Neuchâtel, Switzerland	(Russia) Spartak Junost	200.74	76.46	124.28	(Russia) Team Crystal Ice	199.99	79.44	120.55	(United States) Team Skyliners	193.42	75.79	117.63	
2020	(United Kingdom) Nottingham, Great Britain	(Finland) Team Fintastic	205.94	73.79	132.15	(Russia) Spartak Junost	205.23	76.09	129.14	(Russia) Team Crystal Ice	200.09	75.93	124.16	
2021	Lyon, France	(Originally scheduled for 12 to 14 March 2021 to be held in Angers, France. The event was eventually cancelled.)												
2022	Innsbruck, Austria	(Finland) Team Fintastic	205.61	72.83	132.78	(United States) Team Skyliners	204.39	72.34	132.05	(United States) Teams Elite	204.11	72.41	131.70	
2023	Angers, France	(Finland) Team Fintastic	191.72	67.18	124.54	(Canada) Team Nexxice	186.65	66.12	122.53	(United States) Team Skyliners	186.63	69.40	117.23	
2024	Neuchâtel, Switzerland	(Canada) Les Supremes	205.14	74.01	131.13	(Finland) Team Fintastic	199.71	71.89	127.82	(United States) Team Skyliners	196.68	70.93	125.75	
2025	Gothenburg, Sweden	(United States) Teams Elite	205.28	72.85	132.43	(Finland) Team Fintastic	201.87	71.11	130.76	(United States) Team Skyliners	201.27	73.51	127.76	
2026	Gdańsk, Poland	(Finland) Helsinki Fintastic	218.21	80.53	137.68	(Finland) Valley Bay Synchro	204.86	73.05	131.81	(United States) Team Skyliners	200.40	77.58	122.82	

== See also ==
- Synchronized skating
- ISU World Synchronized Skating Championships
