= Spring Cup (synchronized skating) =

Synchronized skating competition

The Spring Cup is an international, multi-level synchronized skating competition, held annually in Sesto San Giovanni, Italy. Held for the first time in 1995, the competition is organized by Precision Skating Milano, Federazione Italiana Sport del Ghiaccio and sanctioned by the International Skating Union.

== Medalists ==
=== Senior teams ===
Year	Gold	Total	SP	FS	Silver	Total	SP	FS	Bronze	Total	SP	FS	Source(s)
1995	(Italy) Hot Shivers				(United Kingdom) Team Champagne				(Switzerland) Cool Dreams				
1996	(Canada) Les Pirouettes				(Canada) Ice Fire				(Italy) Hot Shivers				
1997	(Sweden) Team Surprise				(Finland) Step by Step				(Canada) Ice Image				
1998	(Sweden) Team Surprise				(Canada) Les Pirouettes				(United States) Haydenettes				
1999	(Canada) Les Suprêmes				(United States) Miami University				(United States) Crystallettes				
2000	(Sweden) Team Surprise				(Finland) Marigold IceUnity				(Canada) Ice Image (now known as NEXXICE)				
2001	(Sweden) Team Surprise				(United States) Haydenettes				(Canada) NEXXICE				
2002	(Finland) Rockettes				(Canada) Black Ice				(United States) Haydenettes				
2003	(Finland) Rockettes				(United States) Team Elan				(Italy) Hot Shivers				
2004	(Russia) Paradise				(United States) Miami University				(Italy) Hot Shivers				
2005	(Sweden) Team Surprise				(Germany) Team Berlin 1				(United States) Miami University				
2006	(Germany) Team Berlin 1	153.77	52.98	100.79	(United States) Miami University	150.92	59.35	91.57	(Canada) NEXXICE	149.59	58.02	91.57	
2007	(Sweden) Team Surprise	191.29	70.23	121.06	(United States) Miami University	189.59	67.43	122.16	(Finland) Marigold IceUnity	178.92	62.83	116.09	
2008	(Canada) NEXXICE	183.62	68.29	115.33	(Canada) Les Suprêmes	178.23	66.96	111.27	(Russia) Tatarstan	158.91	57.63	101.28	
2009	(Germany) Team Berlin 1	181.92	68.26	113.66	(United States) California Gold	162.84	62.71	100.13	(Sweden) Team Boomerang	161.84	60.70	101.14	
2010	(Canada) Black Ice	204.88	72.15	132.73	(Germany) Team Berlin 1	168.62	62.91	105.71	(Russia) Dream Team	152.70	50.98	101.72	
2011	(Sweden) Team Surprise	191.75	65.00	126.75	(Russia) Tatarstan	176.80	58.85	117.95	(United States) Miami University	168.37	60.51	107.86	
2012	(Sweden) Team Surprise	180.77	63.68	117.09	(Russia) Tatarstan	179.13	58.09	121.04	(Sweden) Team Boomerang	152.06	50.55	101.51	
2013	(Sweden) Team Surprise	172.45	53.02	119.43	(Germany) Team Berlin 1	142.36	49.48	92.88	(Italy) Hot Shivers	136.38	44.63	91.75	
2014	(Sweden) Team Surprise	195.62	67.10	128.52	(Italy) Hot Shivers	162.18	53.38	108.80	(United States) Starlights	133.70	50.40	83.30	
