= U.S. Synchronized Skating Championships =

Annual synchronized skating competition

The U.S. Synchronized Skating Championships is an annual synchronized skating competition, sanctioned by U.S. Figure Skating, held to determine the national champions of the United States. It was first held in 1984. Teams who qualify at a Sectional Championship competition compete in eight levels: juvenile, intermediate, novice, junior, senior, collegiate, adult and masters. The top two senior teams then go on to compete at the World Synchronized Skating Championships, while at the Junior level the teams competing at the World Junior Synchronized Skating Championships is predetermined by a Junior World Qualifier competition. The teams competing at the Junior Level at the U.S. Synchronized Skating Championships are competing for international assignment for the next years.

== Name changes ==
When first held in 1984, the competition was called the U.S. Precision Championships.

Subsequently, up to and including 1999, this competition was called the U.S. Precision Team Skating (Synchronized Skating) Championships.

In 2000, the name of the competition was changed to U.S. Synchronized Team Skating Championships.

In 2008, the current name U.S. Synchronized Skating Championships was adopted.

== Competitive Levels ==
The definitions for teams in each of the qualify levels are detailed below. All events are judged under the ISU International Judging System (IJS).

Juvenile: A team of 12-20 skaters. Skaters must be under 13 and have passed the pre-juvenile moves in the field test.

Intermediate: A team of 12-20 skaters. Skaters must be under 18 and have passed the juvenile moves in the field test.

Novice: A team of 12-20 skaters. Skaters must be under 16, with the exception of four skaters who may be 16 or 17, and have passed the intermediate moves in the field test.

Junior: A team of 12-16 skaters. Skaters must be at least 13 years old and under 19. All skaters must have passed the novice moves in the field test.

Senior: A team of 16 skaters. Skaters must be at least 15 years old and have passed the junior moves in the field test.

Collegiate: A team of 12-20 skaters. Skaters must be enrolled in a college or degree program as full-time students and have passed the juvenile moves in the field test.

Adult: A team or 12-20 skaters. All skaters must be 18 years or older. All skaters must have passed at least one of the following tests: preliminary moves in the field, adult bronze moves in the field, preliminary figure or preliminary dance.

Masters: A team or 12-20 skaters. All skaters must be 25 years or older.

== Senior medalists ==
Medalists
Year	Location	Gold	Points	Silver	Points	Bronze	Points	Source
1984	Bowling Green, Ohio	Fraserettes		Ice Chrystallettes		San Diego Figure Skating Club Icettes		
1985	Lakewood, Ohio	Fraserettes		Ice Chrystallettes		Minneapplettes		
1986	Boston, Massachusetts	Hot Fudge Sundaes		Haydenettes		Detroit Capets		
1987	Tulsa, Oklahoma	Fraserettes		Haydenettes		Figurettes		
1988	Reno, Nevada	Haydenettes		Fraserettes		Detroit Capets		
1989	Providence, Rhode Island	Haydenettes		Goldenettes		Detroit Capets		
1990	Houston, Texas	Goldenettes		Haydenettes		Fraserettes		
1991	Anchorage, Alaska	Haydenettes		Goldenettes		Fraserettes		
1992	Portland, Maine	Haydenettes		Team Elan		Goldenettes		
1993	Detroit, Michigan	Haydenettes		Team Elan		Crystallettes		
1994	Providence, Rhode Island	Haydenettes		Team Elan		Miami University		
1995	San Diego, California	Team Elan		Haydenettes		Miami University		
1996	Chicago, Illinois	Haydenettes		Miami University		Team Elan		
1997	Syracuse, New York	Haydenettes		Team Elan		Miami University		
1998	San Diego, California	Haydenettes		Miami University		Team Elan		
1999	Tampa, Florida	Miami University		Haydenettes		Starlets		
2000	Plymouth, Michigan	Haydenettes	1.5	Team Elan	3.0	Miami University	4.5	
2001	Colorado Springs, Colorado	Haydenettes		Miami University		Crystallettes		
2002	Lake Placid, New York	Haydenettes		Miami University		Crystallettes		
2003	Huntsville, Alabama	Haydenettes		Miami University		Team Elan		
2004	San Diego, California	Haydenettes		Crystallettes		Team Elan		
2005	Lowell, Massachusetts	Haydenettes		Miami University		Crystallettes		
2006	Grand Rapids, Michigan	Miami University	179.72	Haydenettes	161.28	Crystallettes	155.12	
2007	Colorado Springs, Colorado	Haydenettes	201.04	Miami University	199.56	Crystallettes	159.65	
2008	Providence, Rhode Island	Haydenettes	213.37	Miami University	201.26	Crystallettes	194.80	
2009	Portland, Maine	Miami University	204.72	Haydenettes	203.97	Crystallettes	184.10	
2010	Minneapolis, Minnesota	Haydenettes	231.14	Crystallettes	210.35	Miami University	202.68	
2011	Ontario, California	Haydenettes	217.41	Miami University	195.50	Crystallettes	179.85	
2012	Worcester, Massachusetts	Haydenettes	202.92	Crystallettes	185.54	Miami University	182.64	
2013	Plymouth, Michigan	Haydenettes	206.33	Miami University	191.28	Crystallettes	176.96	
2014	Colorado Springs, Colorado	Haydenettes	205.03	Crystallettes	179.77	Starlights	154.90	
2015	Providence, Rhode Island	Haydenettes	210.55	Miami University	194.70	Skyliners	178.99	
2016	Kalamazoo, Michigan	Haydenettes	202.26	Miami University	183.86	Skyliners	169.47	
2017	Rockford, Illinois	Haydenettes	208.83	Crystallettes	189.50	Skyliners	172.96	
2018	Portland, Oregon	Haydenettes	204.05	Skyliners	185.86	Miami University	182.99	
2019	Plymouth, Michigan	Haydenettes	226.37	Skyliners	218.14	Crystallettes	201.63	
2020	Providence, Rhode Island	Haydenettes	203.19	Skyliners	194.94	Crystallettes	193.09	
2021	(event cancelled)							
2022	Colorado Springs, Colorado	Haydenettes	218.86	Miami University	214.67	Skyliners	208.36	
2023	Peoria, Illinois	Haydenettes	244.45	Miami University	223.63	Skyliners	220.09	
2024	Las Vegas, Nevada	Haydenettes	234.42	Skyliners	221.58	Miami University	191.08	
2025	Colorado Springs, Colorado	Haydenettes	229.71	Miami University	210.15	Skyliners	209.51	
2026	West Valley City, Utah	Haydenettes	231.38	Skyliners	226.51	Miami University	203.93	

== Junior medalists ==
- since in 2026

Medalists
Year	Location	Gold	Points	Silver	Points	Bronze	Points	Source
2026	West Valley City, Utah	Teams Elite	222.75	Skyliners	216.88	Northernettes	195.48	
