= Haydenettes =

American synchronized skating team

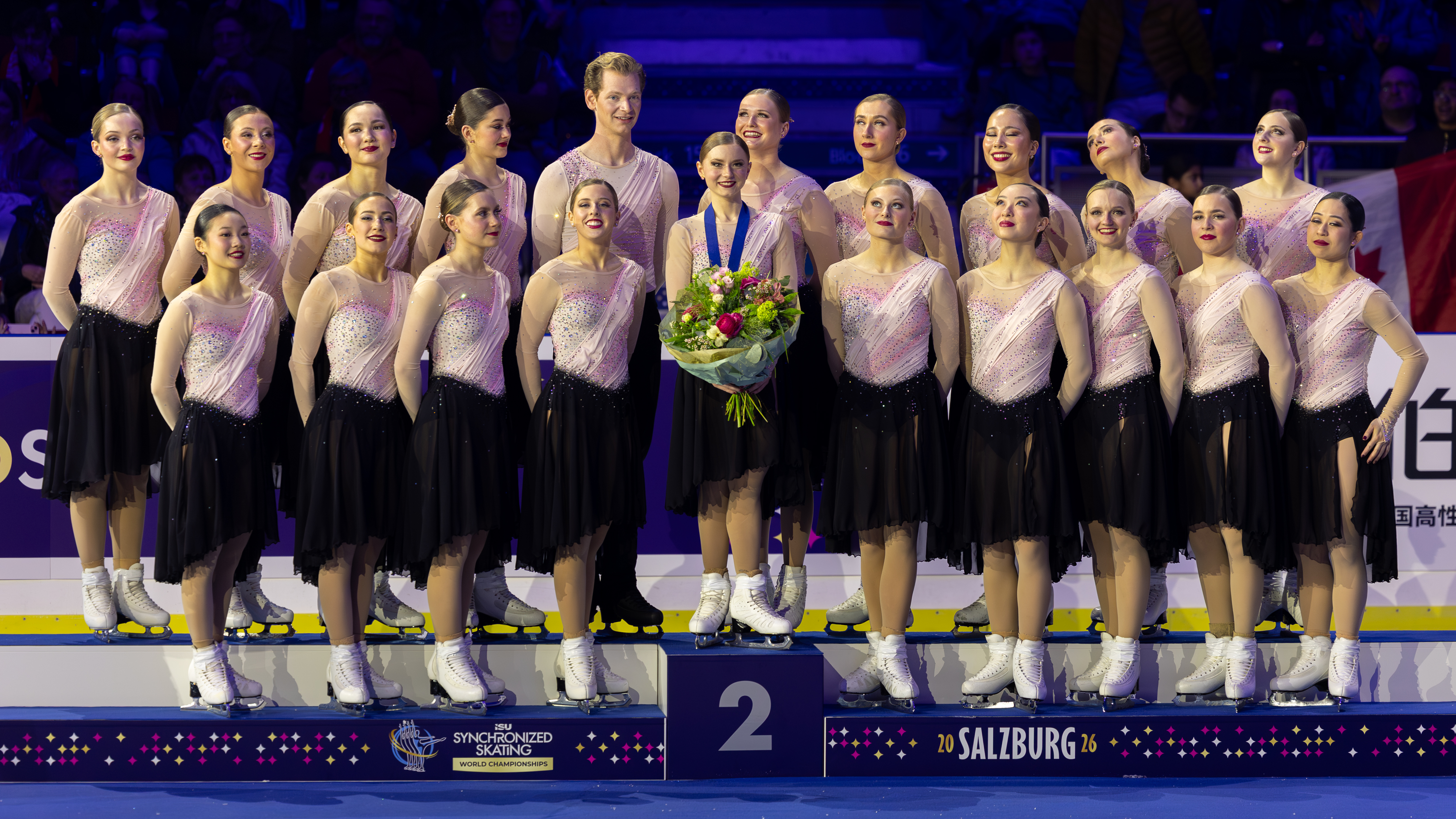
- Team Haydenettes on the podium at the 2026 ISU Synchronized Skating World Championships.

Team information
- Country represented: United States
- Home town: Norwood, Massachusetts, United States
- Skating club: The Skating Club of Boston
- Level: Senior
- World standing: 3
- Season's ranking: 1 (2023–24); 5 (2022–23); 13 (2021–22); N/A (2020–21); 6 (2019–20)

ISU team best scores
- Combined total: 234.66; 2024 Hevelius Cup
- Short program: 78.60; 2024 Hevelius Cup
- Free skate: 156.06; 2024 Hevelius Cup
Medal record
Representing United States
Synchronized skating
World Championships
Silver medal – second place	2024 Zagreb	Synchronized skating
Silver medal – second place	2026 Salzburg	Synchronized skating
Bronze medal – third place	2010 Colorado Springs	Synchronized skating
Bronze medal – third place	2011 Helsinki	Synchronized skating
Bronze medal – third place	2012 Gothenburg	Synchronized skating
Bronze medal – third place	2013 Boston	Synchronized skating
Bronze medal – third place	2016 Budapest	Synchronized skating
Bronze medal – third place	2025 Helsinki	Synchronized skating

The Haydenettes are a senior-level synchronized skating team representing The Skating Club of Boston based in Norwood, Massachusetts, United States. They are the two-time silver medalists (2024, 2026) and six-time bronze medalists (2010, 2011, 2012, 2013, 2016 and 2025) at the World Synchronized Skating Championships. Formed in 1979 by Lynn Benson, the Haydenettes are the most successful synchronized skating team in U.S. history, with 33 U.S. National titles.

In the 2026-27 season, the Haydenettes are fielding two homonymous senior-level squads: Haydenettes9 and Haydenettes16. Haydenettes9 is a nine-skater team formed to compete in Synchro9, a version of synchronized skating officially added to the 2028 Winter Youth Olympics and the 2030 Olympics in July 2026. Haydenettes16 continues to compete in the traditional 16-skater senior-level division.

== Team ==
Members of the Haydenettes are required to have mastered advanced figure skating skills, including senior-level moves, gold-level pattern dances, and at least novice freestyle. The Hayden teams draw skaters from around the world, though the teams are composed primarily of skaters from the greater Boston area. The Haydenettes practice at both the Hayden Recreation Center in Lexington, Massachusetts, the New England Sports Center in Marlborough, Massachusetts, and The Skating Club of Boston in Norwood, Massachusetts. Synchronized skating is sanctioned by U. S. Figure Skating (USFS) and the International Skating Union (ISU), the two governing bodies for all skating events in the U.S. and internationally, respectively.

=== Associated Teams ===
Hayden Synchro, the organization to which the Haydenettes belong, currently fields competitive teams in seven divisions in synchronized skating that compete under sanctioning by USFSA. The teams appear in various ice shows, exhibitions and other events around the country.

Hayden Synchro has a total of ten synchronized skating teams spanning seven competitive levels:

1. Shooting Stars Academy, Developmental (non-competitive)
2. Shooting Stars, Preliminary
3. Shooting Stars, Pre-Juvenile
4. Mini Mates, Juvenile
5. Star Mates, Intermediate (Novice in 2019 and 2020)
6. Ice Mates, Novice (Intermediate in 2019 and 2020)
7. Lexettes9, Junior
8. Lexettes16, Junior
9. Haydenettes9, Senior
10. Haydenettes16, Senior

== Coaches ==
The Haydenettes are coached by Saga Krantz and assistant coaches Ashley Tomich and Lee Chandler.

=== Saga Krantz ===
A resident of Boston, Saga Krantz has been head coach for the Haydenettes since 2005. From 2000 to 2004, Krantz was director of Helsingin Taitoluisteluklubi (HTK) in Helsinki, Finland. Under Krantz's coaching, the HTK senior team Rockettes won World silver, Finnish National gold and silver medals and the junior team Team Fintastic won Finnish National gold medal. Saga Krantz was also recognized as the 2008 Professional Skating Association (PSA) Synchronized Skating Coach of the Year and was inducted into the PSA Coaches Hall of Fame in 2023. Krantz speaks Finnish, English, and Swedish.

== Practice ==
The Haydenettes practice for about 12-14 hours on ice per week during the school year, with an average of 15-18 practice hours per week. Additionally, the Haydenettes hold at least three off-ice practices per week. Prior to a competition, the team practice time is increased to 18 hours per week.

== Programs ==
Competition programs by season
Season	Short program	Free skate program
2008–09	"Libertango": by Bond and Piazzolla<	Music from the Forbidden Kingdom
2009–10	"A Wonderful World": by Sarah Brightman	Music from the West Side Story soundtrack
2010–11	"Twilight" and "Ritmo de la Noche": by Safri Duo	Music from the Burlesque soundtrack
2011–12	"Dancing with the Muse" by Chris Spheeris	Lady Gaga medley
2012–13	"Run this Town / Posthumus Zone": by Jay-Z, Rihanna, and E.S. Posthumus	Music from the Dirty Dancing: Havana Nights soundtrack
2013–14	“Dark Side of the Crown”: by Bellydance Evolution	The Count of Monte Cristo soundtrack
2014–15	“James Bond in Miami”: by Monte Norman & John Barry	Sunset Boulevard soundtrack
2015–16	“All or Nothing”: by Brand X Music	"Empire State Of Mind (Part II)": by Alicia Keys
2016–17	"Now We Are Free" theme music of Gladiator	Prince medley
2017–18	"Run Boy Run": by Woodkid	"Underground Nightlife""Iron": by Woodkid; "Jungle Bae": by Skrillex & Diplo
2018–19	"Gravity": by Raphael Beau	Music from The Greatest Showman
2019–20	"It's All Coming Back to Me Now": by Celine Dion	Medley by INXS
2021–22	"Sweet Dreams (Are Made of This)": by Dave Stewart & His Rock Fabulous Orchestra	"Hold On To Tomorrow": by Brennan Heart feat. CHRISTON and Metropole Orkest
2022–23	"Good Times Roll": by Big Gigantic, GriZ	"Quest for Souls": by Reliable Source Music, David Marsden; "Inner Peace": by Reliable Source Music, Robert De Fresnes; "Hope and Dreams of Grandeur": by Karl Hugo; "Ocean Princess": by Thomas Bergersen
2023–24	"Clair de Lune": by Imagine Music	"Who Wants to Live Forever": by Queen
2024–25	"Lim Fantasy of Companionship for Piano and Orchestra": by Barau Joi, Martin Manuel Denis; "Fantasietta on a Theme from 'Photograph'": by Cody Fry; "Lim Fantasy for Companionship for Piano and Orchestra": by Barau Jayanta Dhar, Danziger Ron Josef, Eymard Matthieu, Vincent Nicolas, Joselson Tedd Jeffrey, Lim Susan Mey Lee, Martin Manuel Denis, and Tan Christina Jin Hui	"Caves": by Cody Fry; "Eleanor Rigby": by Cody Fry; "Eleanor Noel": by Joshua Bell, Frankie Moreno, John Lennon, and Paul McCartney
2025–26	“Crazy Train”: by Joseph William Morgan	“Somewhere Only We Know”: by Sons of Serendip

== Competitive highlights ==
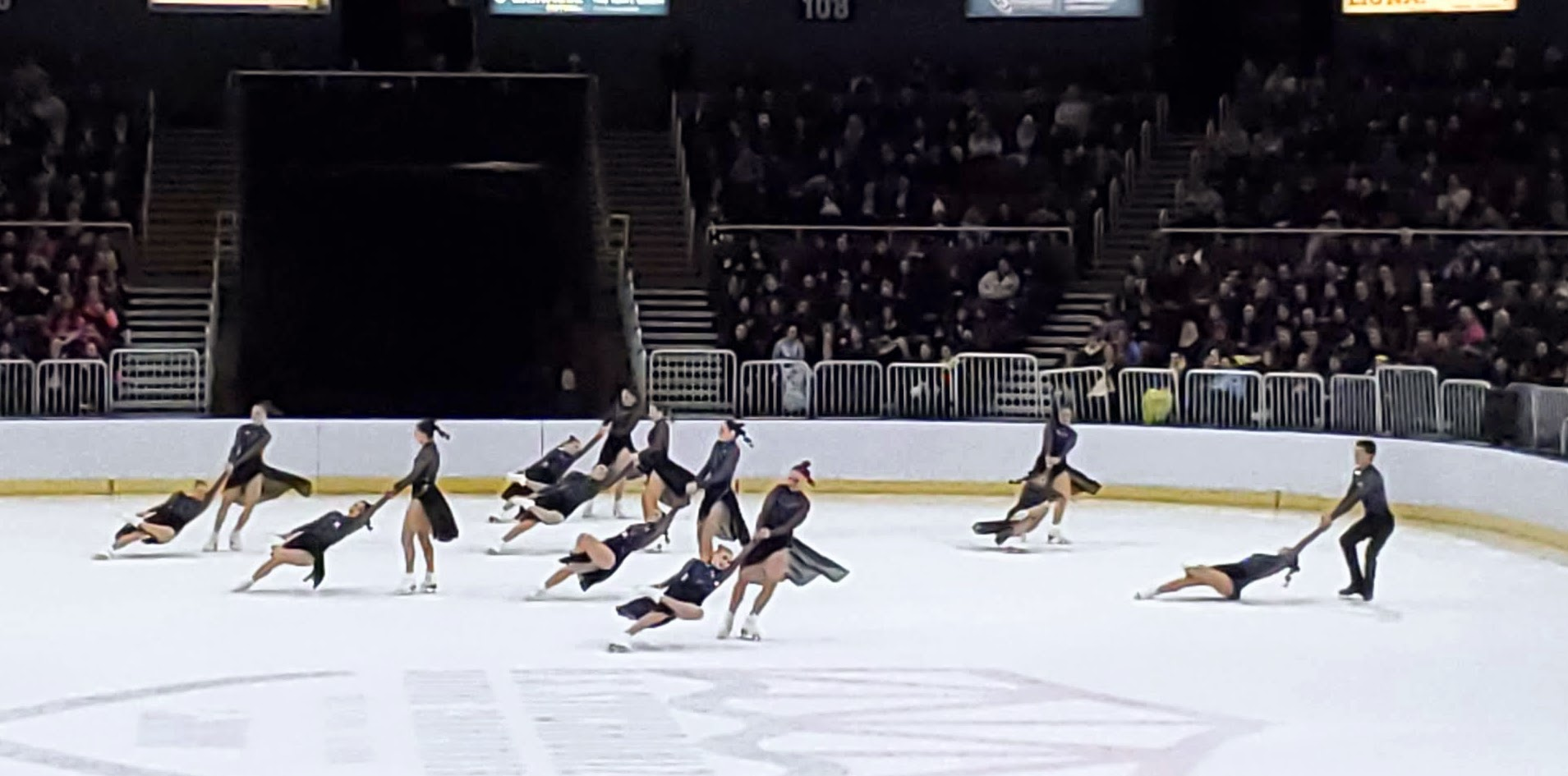
Haydenettes partner element at 2023 US Championships

The Haydenettes are 33-time National champions, 26-time ISU World Championship competitors, and eight-time ISU World Medalists in the senior-level division. The Haydenettes have represented the U.S. in every World Championship since the International Skating Union (ISU) sanctioned the first World Championship event in 2000. The team's success has earned it the nickname "The Haydenettes Dynasty."

During 2003, the Haydenettes led a contingent of three teams to France where they won The French Cup for the U.S. In addition, the United States contingent won The Nations Cup, awarded to the highest scoring country in this competition. Their awards include the Bronze medal in the 2005 Prague Cup and the Silver medal in the 2004 Neuchâtel Trophy in Switzerland.

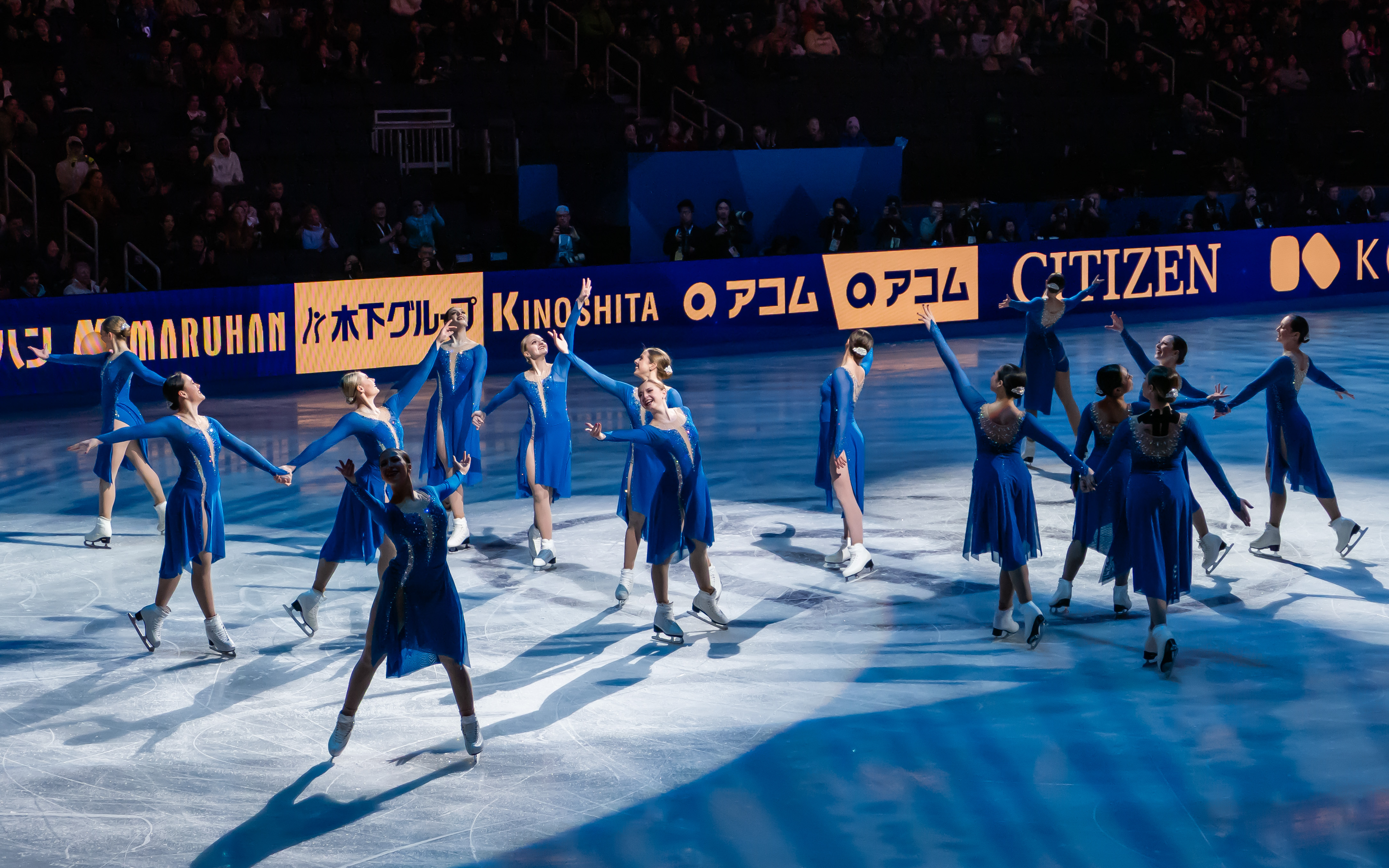
The Haydenttes performing in the 2025 World Figure Skating Championships gala

The Haydenettes were the 2010 national champions with a score of 231.14, the highest-ever posted to date at the U.S. Synchronized Skating Championships by nearly 18 points. They went on to win the bronze medal at the World Championships held in Colorado Springs, Colorado in 2010. The team won their second bronze at the 2011 World Championships in Helsinki, Finland. They earned their third World bronze in 2012 in Gothenburg and fourth consecutive World bronze in Boston in 2013.

=== Synchronized skating ===
==== Competitive results (2010–present) ====
International
Event	10–11	11–12	12–13	13–14	14–15	15–16	16–17	17–18	18–19	19–20	20–21	21–22	22–23	23–24	24–25	25–26
World Championships	3rd	3rd	3rd	7th	7th	3rd	4th	7th	6th	Cancelled	(events not held)	5th	5th	2nd	3rd	2nd
ISU Grand Prix Final						5th					(events not held)					
Britannia Cup										1st	(events not held)					3rd CS
Budapest Cup											(events not held)			2nd CS		
California Cup										2nd CS	(events not held)					
Cup of Berlin							2nd				(events not held)					
Dresden Cup											(events not held)				3rd CS	
French Cup			7th	5th	6th					5th CS	(events not held)					2nd
Hevelius Cup											(events not held)			1st CS		
International Classic											(events not held)				3rd CS	2nd CS
Leon Lurje Trophy						2nd	2nd	1st	3rd		(events not held)		4th CS			
Mozart Cup	2nd								5th		(events not held)		2nd CS			
Neuchâtel Trophy		2nd						3rd			(events not held)					
Shanghai Trophy						2nd		5th			(events not held)					
Spring Cup					3rd						(events not held)					
National
U.S. Championships	1st	1st	1st	1st	1st	1st	1st	1st	1st	1st	(events not held)	1st	1st	1st	1st	1st
CS - Denotes challenger series competitions

==== Competitive results (1999–2010) ====
International
Event	99–00	00–01	01–02	02–03	03–04	04–05	05–06	06–07	07–08	08–09	09–10
World Championships	5th	5th	4th	5th	4th	4th	7th	4th	5th	4th	3rd
Cup of Berlin									4th		3rd
French Cup	1st			1st			5th			3rd	
Neuchâtel Trophy					2nd						
Prague Cup						3rd		4th			
Spring Cup		2nd	3rd								
National
U.S. Championships	1st	1st	1st	1st	1st	1st	2nd	1st	1st	2nd	1st

=== Synchro9 ===
==== Competitive results ====
International
Event	26–27
Synchro9 International Competition (USA)	3rd
