= 2018–19 synchronized skating season =

Competitive synchronized skating year from 2018/7/1 to 2019/6/30

- Date: July 1, 2018 – June 30, 2019
- Previous: 2017–18
- Next: 2019–20

The 2018–19 synchronized skating season began on July 1, 2018, and ended on June 30, 2019. Running concurrent with the 2018–19 figure skating season. During this season, elite synchronized skating teams competed in the ISU Championship level at the 2019 World Championships. They also competed at various other elite level international and national competitions.

== Competitions ==
The 2018–19 season included the following major competitions.

Key

ISU Championships	Other international	Nationals

Date	Event	Type	Level	Location	Details
2018
Sep 29 – Oct 1	Shanghai Trophy	Other int	Senior	Shanghai, China	(Event cancelled)
October 5–7	Finlandia Trophy	Other int.	Senior	Espoo, Finland	Details
November 16–18	Autumn Cup	Other int	Sen.-Nov.	Granada, Spain	Details
November 22–24	Winter Cup	Other int	Sen.-Nov.	Gullegem, Belgium	Details
December 13–16	Riga Amber Cup	Other int	Sen.-Jun.	Riga, Latvia	Details
December 14–16	Lumière Cup	Other int	Sen.-Nov.	Eindhoven, Netherlands	Details
2019
January 11–13	Russian Synchronized Skating Championship	Nats	Sen.-Jun	Yoshkar-Ola, Russia	Details
January 12–13	Cup of Berlin	Other int	Sen.-Nov.	Berlin, Germany	(Event cancelled)
January 17–20	Mozart Cup	Other int	Sen.-Nov.	Salzburg, Austria	Details
January 25–27	Leon Lurje Trophy	Other int	Sen.-Nov.	Gothenburg, Sweden	Details
February 1–3	French Cup	Other int	Sen.-Nov.	Rouen, France	Details
February 8–9	Zagreb Snowflakes Trophy	Other int	Sen.-Nov.	Zagreb, Croatia	Details
February 8–10	Trophy D'Ecosse	Other int	Sen.-Nov.	Dumfries, England	Details
February 14–17	Budapest Cup	Other int	Sen.-Nov.	Budapest, Hungary	Details
February 15–17	Spring Cup	Other int	Sen.-Jun.	Sesto San Giovanni, Italy	Details
February 22–24	Canadian Synchronized Skating Championships	Nats	Sen.-Nov.	Waterloo, Canada	Details
February 23–24	Swedish Synchronized Skating Championships	Nats	Sen.-Nov.	Nacka, Sweden	Details
Feb 28 – Mar 2	U.S. Synchronized Skating Championships	Nats	Sen.-Nov.	Plymouth, USA	Details
March 2–3	Finnish Synchronized Skating Championships	Nats	Sen.-Nov.	Turku, Finland	Details
March 2–12	Winter Universiade	Other int	Senior	Krasnoyarsk, Russia	Details
March 15–16	ISU World Junior Synchronized Skating Championships	ISU Championships	Junior	Neuchâtel, Switzerland	Details
April 12–14	ISU World Synchronized Skating Championships	ISU Championships	Senior	Helsinki, Finland	Details
Type: ISU Champ. = ISU Championships; Other int. = International events except ISU Championships; Nats. = National championships Levels: Sen. = Senior; Jun. = Junior; Nov. = Novice

== International medalists ==
Championships
Competition	Gold	Silver	Bronze	Results
Worlds	(Russia) Team Paradise	(Finland) Marigold IceUnity	(Finland) Rockettes	
Junior Worlds	(Russia) Team Junost	(Russia) Team Crystal Ice	(United States) Skyliners	
Other senior internationals
Competition	Gold	Silver	Bronze	Results
Shanghai Trophy	(Event not held)			
Finlandia Trophy	(Finland) Marigold IceUnity	(Russia) Team Paradise	(Finland) Team Unique	
Autumn Cup	(Italy) Hot Shivers	(No other competitors)		
Winter Cup	(France) Les Zoulous	(Netherlands) Team Illumination	(Belgium) Team Phoenix	
Riga Amber Cup	(Russia) Dream Team	(Latvia) Team Amber	(No other competitors)	
Lumière Cup	(Canada) Les Suprêmes	(Finland) Rockettes	(Germany) Skating Graces	
Cup of Berlin	(Event not held)			
Mozart Cup	(Canada) Nova	(Finland) Marigold IceUnity	(Russia) Team Crystal Ice	
Leon Lurje Trophy	(Russia) Team Paradise	(Finland) Rockettes	(United States) Haydenettes	
French Cup	(Russia) Team Paradise	(Finland) Marigold IceUnity	(Finland) Rockettes	
Zagreb Snowflakes Trophy	(Russia) Tatarstan	(United States) Skyliners	(Germany) Team Berlin 1	
Trophy D'Ecosse	(Canada) NEXXICE	(United States) Crystallettes	(United Kingdom) Team Icicles	
Budapest Cup	(Russia) Team Paradise	(Germany) Team Berlin 1	(Finland) Team Unique	
Spring Cup	(Canada) NEXXICE	(Finland) Lumineers	(United States) Crystallettes	
Winter Universiade	(Finland) Team Unique	(Finland) Marigold IceUnity	(Russia) Tatarstan	
