= Skyliners Synchronized Skating Team =

American synchronized skating team

Skyliners Synchronized Skating Skating Team
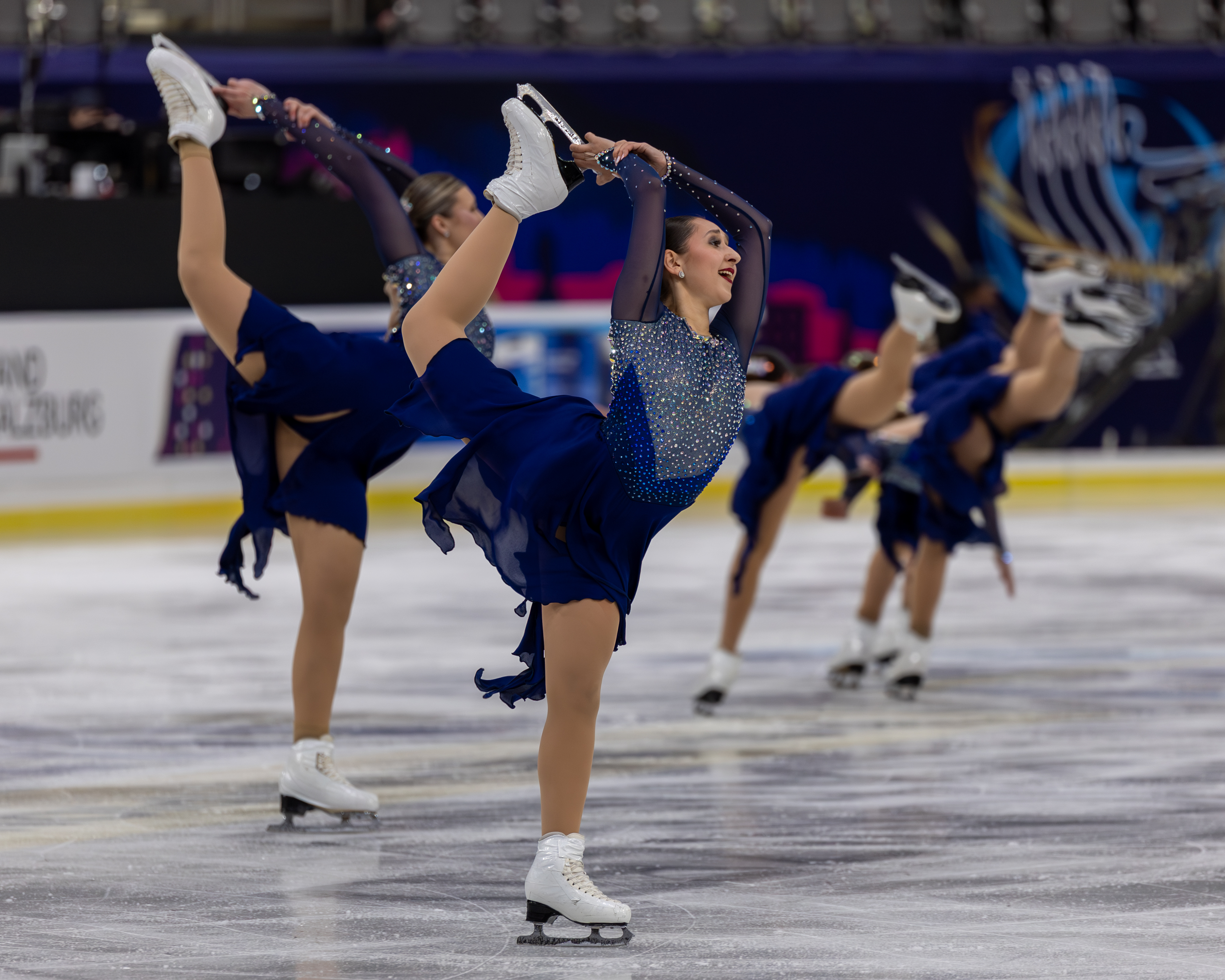
- Skyliners performing at the 2026 World Championships.

Team information
- Country represented: United States
- Formed: 2001
- Skating club: SC of New York
- Level: Senior, Junior
- Training locations: Stamford, USA
- World standing: 11 Sr, 2 Jr
- Season's ranking: 11 (2019–20); 10 (2019–20) Jr; N/A (2020–21); 21 (2021–22); 3 (2021–22) Jr; 15 (2022–23); 2 (2022–23) Jr; 5 (2023–24); 2 (2023–24) Jr

ISU team best scores
- Combined total: 214.32; 2024 Lumiere Cup
- Short program: 75.62; French Cup 2022
- Free skate: 142.25; 2024 Lumiere Cup
Medal record
Representing United States
Synchronized skating
World Junior Championships
Silver medal – second place	2018 Zagreb	Synchronized skating
Silver medal – second place	2022 Innsbruck	Synchronized skating
Bronze medal – third place	2019 Neuchatel	Synchronized skating
Bronze medal – third place	2023 Angers	Synchronized skating
Bronze medal – third place	2024 Neuchatel	Synchronized skating
Bronze medal – third place	2025 Gothenburg	Synchronized skating
Bronze medal – third place	2026 Gdansk	Synchronized skating

The Skyliners Synchronized Skating Team is a synchronized skating team from the New York metropolitan area, United States.

Skyliners Synchronized Skating Team was established in 2001, and started competing internationally in 2003. they are four-time World championships competitors, seven-time World Junior Championships medalists (2018, 2019, 2022, 2023, 2024, 2025, 2026), eleven-time U.S national medalists (2015–2020, 2022–2026), and seven-time U.S junior national champions (2011, 2015, 2017–2020, 2023).

== Programs ==
=== Senior ===
Season	Short program	Free skating
2016–17	"California Dreaming": performed by The Mamas & The Papas	"I Wanna Dance With Somebody": by "Whitney Houston"
2017–18	"I Was Here": performed by Beyoncé	Cleopatra: by various artists
2018–19	"What a Wonderful World": by Joseph William Morgan feat. Shadow Royale	Music from the Turandot Soundtrack: by various artists
2019–20	Warrior: by various artists	Queen and Freddie Mercury Medley
2020–21	(Did not compete)	
2021–22	"Everybody Wants to Rule the World": by Cinematic Pop	"Somebody's Watching Me" Tracks used: 1. "Somebody's Watching Me" (performed by Hidden Citizens; 2. "Can't Help Falling in Love-LIGHT" (performed by Tommee Profitt and Brooke); 3. "I Ran (So Far Away)" (performed by Hidden Citizens)
2022–23	"Crazy": by Brittney Spears	Music from SIX the musical
2023–24	"Writings on the Wall': by Sam Smith, James Napier	Romeo and Juliet Tracks used: 1. "Romeo & Juliet" (Epic Trailer Version) by Hidden Citizens, Daniel Austin Olson, Pyotr Tchaikovsky, Sergei Prokofiev; 2. "Crazy in Love" (Epic Trailer Version) (feat, Wulf) by J2, Beyonce, Jay-Z, Rich Harrison, Eugene Record; 3. "(I Just) Died in Your Arms" (Epic Trailer Version) by Hidden Citizens, Nicholas Eede
2024–25	"En Aranjuez Con Tu Amor": by Andrea Bocelli, London Symphony Orchestra and Lorin Maazel	Unseen humans Tracks used: 1. "Creep" (performed by Sheldon Riley, Albert Hammond Colin Greenwood); 2. "Dolores" (performed by Audiomachine, composed by Harry Lightfoot); 3. "The Gallows" (performed by Audiomachine, composed by Harry Lightfoot)

== Competitive highlights ==
=== Senior results ===
==== Since 2017–18 seasons ====
International
Event	17–18	18–19	19–20	20–21	21–22	22–23	23–24	24–25	25–26
World Championships	9th	8th		(events not held)			6th	8th	6th
California Cup			5th CS	(events not held)					
Cup of Berlin	1st			(events not held)					
French Cup				(events not held)	2nd CS				
International Classic				(events not held)				6th CS	5th CS
Lumiere Cup				(events not held)			2nd CS		3rd CS
Marie Lundmark Trophy				(events not held)			4th CS		
Mozart Cup	2nd	6th		(events not held)				4th CS	
Neuchatel Trophy				(events not held)		3rd CS			
Riga Amber Cup				(events not held)					3rd
Santa Claus Cup				(events not held)				3rd	
Spring Cup			5th CS	(events not held)		5th CS			
Zagreb Snowflakes		2nd	1st	(events not held)					
National
U.S. Champs	2nd	2nd	2nd	(events not held)	3rd	3rd	2nd	3rd	2nd
CS - Denotes challenger series competitions

==== 2011–17 seasons ====
International
Event	11–12	12–13	13–14	14–15	15–16	16–17
Cup of Berlin				5th		
Leon Lurje Trophy			5th			
Mozart Cup						3rd
Neuchâtel Trophy					4th	
Spring Cup		4th				
Zagreb Snowflakes						1st
National
U.S. Champs	5th	4th	5th	3rd	3rd	3rd

=== Junior results ===
==== Since 2017–18 seasons ====
International
Event	17–18	18–19	19–20	20–21	21–22	22–23	23–24	24–25	25–26
World Junior Championships	2nd	3rd		(events not held)	2nd	3rd	3rd	3rd	3rd
Britannia Cup			1st	(events not held)					3rd CS
California Cup			2nd CS	(events not held)					
Cup of Berlin	1st			(events not held)					
Dresden Cup				(events not held)				5th CS	
French Cup	2nd	2nd	4th CS	(events not held)					
Hevelius Cup				(events not held)			2nd CS		
International Classic				(events not held)				3rd CS	2nd CS
Leon Lurje Trophy				(events not held)		3rd CS			
Lumiere Cup				(events not held)			1st CS		
Mozart Cup		2nd		(events not held)	1st	1st CS			
Santa Claus Cup				(events not held)				3rd	2nd
National
U.S. Champs	1st	1st	1st	(events not held)	3rd	1st	2nd	2nd	2nd
CS - Denotes challenger series competitions

==== 2008–17 seasons ====
International
Event	08–09	09–10	10–11	11–12	12–13	13–14	14–15	15–16	16–17
World Junior Championships (Note: From 2010 to 2012, and 2016, the junior world championships were exchanged for the Junior World Challenge Cup)		5th	5th	5th	7th		6th	4th	4th
Cup of Berlin									1st
French Cup				4th	4th		5th	3rd	3rd
Leon Lurje Trophy								1st	
Mozart Cup						7th			
Spring Cup	3rd		1st						
National
U.S. Champs	7th	2nd	1st	2nd	2nd	6th	1st	2nd	1st
