= NEXXICE =

Canadian synchronized skating team

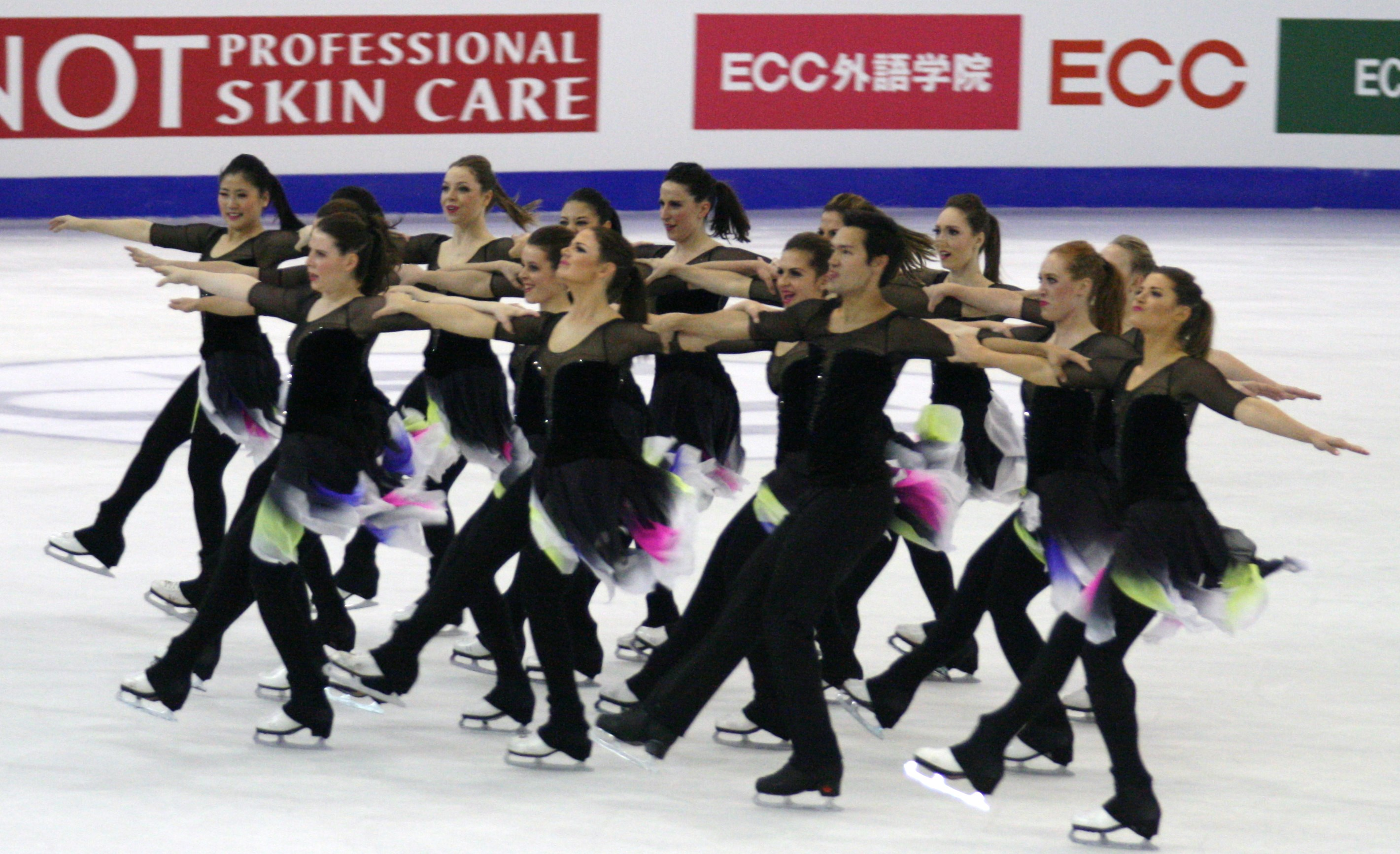

Team information
- Country represented: Canada
- Home town: Burlington, ON, Canada
- Coach: Shelley Simonton Barnett and Anne Schelter
- Skating club: Burlington Skating Centre
- Level: Senior
- World standing: 4

ISU team best scores
- Combined total: 223.58; 2009 Worlds
- Short program: 80.12; 2009 Worlds
- Free skate: 146.03; 2014 Worlds
Medal record
Representing Canada
Synchronized skating
World Championships
Gold medal – first place	2015 Hamilton	Synchronized skating
Gold medal – first place	2009 Zagreb	Synchronized skating
Silver medal – second place	2014 Courmayeur	Synchronized skating
Silver medal – second place	2013 Boston	Synchronized skating
Silver medal – second place	2012 Gothenburg	Synchronized skating
Bronze medal – third place	2008 Budapest	Synchronized skating
Bronze medal – third place	2007 London	Synchronized skating
Bronze medal – third place	2017 Colorado Springs	Synchronized skating

NEXXICE is the name for synchronized skating teams representing Burlington Skating Centre from Burlington, Ontario, Canada. Their senior team are twelve-time Canadian national champions (2007–15,2017,2023), the first North American team to win the World Championships (2009), and again in 2015. They are 2012–14 World silver medallists and 2007–08 & 2016-17 World bronze medallists.

The NEXXICE teams' coaching staff includes Shelley Barnett and Anne Schelter. For the 2006–07 season the club added a Junior competitive team and Adult competitive team to their club. Both are coached by Trish Mills. In the 2009–10 season the Adult team switched to the Open category. In the 2011–12 season the club announced that the Beginner, Juvenile, Novice and Intermediate teams from Burlington (formerly Ice Image) would now be under the name NEXXICE as well.

== Competitive results ==
Competition placements since the 2019-20 season
Season	2019-20	2020-21	2021-22	2022-23	2023-24	2024-25	2025-26
World Championships	C	C	4th	4th			
Canadian Championships	2nd	C	2nd	1st	3rd	3rd	3rd
CS Budapest Cup					2nd		
CS French Cup						2nd	
CS Marie Lundmark Trophy							4th
CS Hevelius Cup					4th		
CS Leon Lurje Trophy	6th						
CS Mozart Cup				1st			
CS Spring Cup	3rd			3rd			
CS U.S. International Classic							4th
Lumière Cup						2nd	

Competition placements between the 2010-11 and 2018-19 season
Season	2010-11	2011-12	2012-13	2013-14	2014-15	2015-16	2016-17	2017-18	2018-19
World Championships	5th	2nd	2nd	2nd	1st	7th	3rd	8th	4th
Canadian Championships	1st	1st	1st	1st	1st	2nd	1st	1st	2nd
French Cup			6th				4th	5th	
Mozart Cup		3rd		3rd					
Shanghai Trophy							4th		
Spring Cup					1st				1st
SynchroFest International		1st							
Trophy d'Ecosse					1st		1st	1st	1st

=== NEXXICE Senior (2000–2010) ===
National
Event	2000–01	2001–02	2002–03	2003–04	2004–05	2005–06	2006–07	2007–08	2008–09	2009–10
Canadian Championships	3rd	4th	3rd	3rd	3rd	2nd	1st	1st	1st	1st
Source										
International
Event	2000–01	2001–02	2002–03	2003–04	2004–05	2005–06	2006–07	2007–08	2008–09	2009–10
World Championships						9th	3rd	3rd	1st	5th
Source										
Cup of Berlin					4th					
Source										
French Cup		3rd	4th				5th		4th	3rd
Source										
North American Synchro International			3rd							
Source										
Neuchâtel Trophy				5th						
Source										
Spring Cup	3rd					3rd		1st		
Source										

=== NEXXICE Junior ===
Event	2006–07	2007–08	2008–09	2009–10	2010–11	2011–12	2012–13	2013–14	2014–15	2015–16
Canadian Championships	3rd		1st	1st	1st	1st	1st	2nd	2nd	1st
World Junior Championships (2013→) (2007–2012 Junior World Challenge Cup)		6th	2nd	2nd	4th	6th	4th		5th	
Winterfest - Junior World Challenge Cup Qualifier	3rd	1st	1st	1st	1st	2nd	1st	3rd	2nd	2nd
French Cup				2nd		5th				
Mozart Cup					1st					
Prague Cup		4th								
Cup of Berlin							2nd			
Spring Cup	5th		1st						2nd	
Neuchâtel Trophy										2nd

=== Other NEXXICE teams ===
Event	2006–07	2007–08	2008–09	2009–10	2010–11	2011–12
Canadian Championships - Adult Competitive	2nd	1st	2nd			
Canadian Championships - Open				1st	2nd	3rd
Canadian Championships - Intermediate						1st
Canadian Championships - Novice						4th
Ontario Regional Championships - Open				1st	1st	2nd
Ontario Regional Championships - Intermediate						2nd
Ontario Regional Championships - Novice						2nd
Ontario Regional Championships - Juvenile						4th

== Programs ==
=== NEXXICE Senior ===
Season	Short	Free
2019-2020	O Fortuna by: Carl Orff	Garden Statues; Music from: "Reliquary" by Ilan Eshkeri
2018-2019	Malaguena by: Stanley Black	The Handmaid's Tale; Music from: “This Women’s Work” by Kate Bush
2017-2018	Spellbound Concerto by: Miklos Rozsa, played by Earl Wild	River; Music from: "River" by Leon Bridges and "S.O.B" by Nathaniel Rateliff
2016-2017	Got Your Number by: Serena Ryder	The Widow; Music from: "Hymn" by Adiemus, "If" and "Time Lapse" by Michael Nyman
2015-2016	Carol of the Bells by: Trans-Siberian Orchestra	Bohemian Rhapsody by: Queen
2014-2015	Mud by: The Road Hammers	Rhapsody in Blue by: George Gershwin
2013-2014	Cinderella's Waltz by: Prokofiev	West Side Story by: Leonard Bernstein
2012-2013	Telephone Call From Istanbul; Music from Franks Wild Years by: Tom Waits	Die Fledermaus by: Johann Strauss II
2011-2012	Tao Drums; Music from Tao Drummers of Japan: Red Run	Micmacs; Music from the motion picture Micmacs by: Raphaël Beau
2010-2011	A Midsummer Night's Dream - A Tango by: Astor Piazzolla; Commissioned for the Opera Comedie Francaise	Folk songs of the Andes by: Incantation
2009-2010	Morning Mood (Norwegian: Morgenstemning) from Peer Gynt Suite by: Edvard Grieg	Carmen from the motion picture Carlos Saura's Flamenco Trilogy: Carmen
2008-2009	Baba Yetu by: Christopher Tin	Carmina Burana by: Carl Orff
2007-2008	Masquerade Waltz by: Khachaturian	Oceania; Maori Music by: Hinewehi Mohi, Jaz Coleman and Hirini Melbourne
2006-2007	Unchained Melody by: The Righteous Brothers	Edward Scissorhands from the motion picture Edward Scissorhands by: Danny Elfman
2005-2006	Peter Gunn by: Henry Mancini performed by: Sarah Vaughan	The Legend of Zorro from the motion picture The Legend of Zorro composed by: James Horner
2004-2005	Songs from the Victorious City by: Anne Dudley and Jaz Coleman	Between Heaven and Earth by: A. R. Rahman
2003-2004	Chicago	O from Cirque du Soleil composed by: Benoit Jutras
2002-2003	Fly Me to the Moon by: Frank Sinatra Chicago	Romeo & Juliet
2001-2002	Flight of the Bumble Bee from the opera The Tale of Tsar Saltan by: Nikolai Rimsky-Korsakov	Romeo & Juliet
2000-2001	Cinderella Waltz	Cleopatra

=== NEXXICE Junior ===
Season	Short	Free
2011-2012	Americano by: Lady Gaga	Alice in Wonderland from the 2010 motion picture Alice in Wonderland music by: Danny Elfman
2010-2011	Be Italian from the motion picture Nine music by: Andrea Guerra performed by: Fergie	Evita from the musical Evita music by: Andrew Lloyd Webber
2009-2010	World On A String by: Frank Sinatra performed by: Michael Buble	Les Misérables from the musical Les Miserables composed by: Schönberg lyrics by: Alain Boublil and Jean-Marc Natel; English-language libretto by: Herbert Kretzmer
2008-2009	Seven Day Fool by: Jully Black	August Rush from the motion picture August Rush music by: Mark Mancina
2007-2008	Hey Big Spender by: Cy Coleman and Dorothy Fields performed by: Shirley Bassey	Spirit of Africa
2006-2007	DJ Latino Salsa by: Gypsie Kings	Harry Potter from the motion picture Harry Potter and the Goblet of Fire music by: Patrick Doyle
