= Teams Elite =

American synchronized skating team

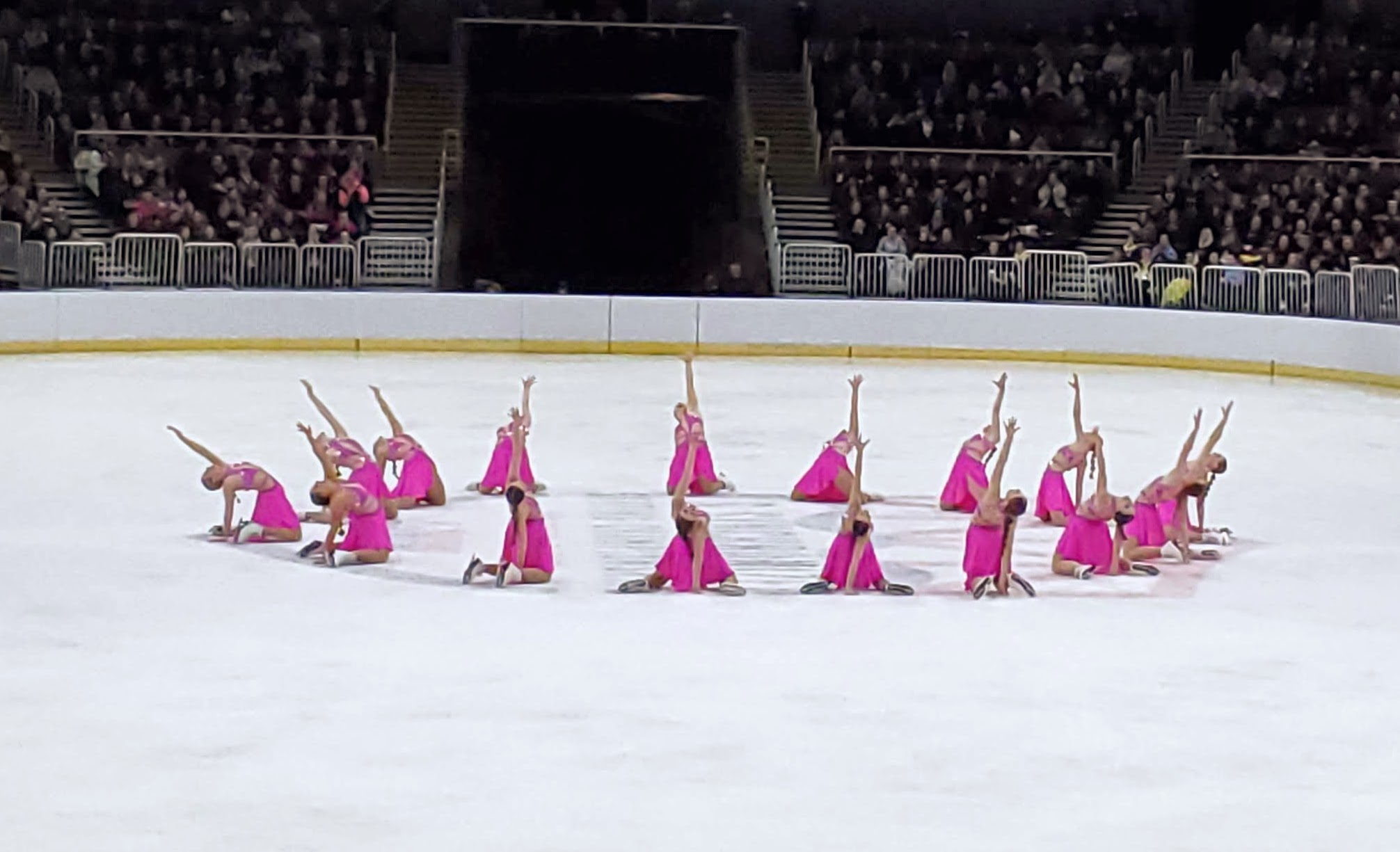
- Teams Elite Senior at the 2023 US Championships

Team information
- Country represented: United States
- Formed: 2000
- Skating club: Individual member
- Level: Senior, Junior
- Training locations: Northbrook, IL
- World standing: 2 (2021–22)

ISU team best scores
- Combined total: 205.54; 2024 Hevelius Cup, Junior
- Short program: 77.95; 2024 Hevelius Cup, Junior
- Free skate: 132.43; 2025 Junior Worlds
Medal record
Representing United States
Synchronized skating
World Junior Championships
Gold medal – first place	2025 Gothenburg	Synchronized skating
Bronze medal – third place	2022 Innsbruck	Synchronized skating

Teams Elite is a synchronized skating club from Northbrook, Illinois, United States, fielding junior, aspire, preliminary, pre juvenile, juvenile, intermediate, novice, adult and senior level teams.Teams elite is most commonly known for its junior and senior teams

Teams Elite was established in 2000, and started competing internationally in 2018. They are World Junior Championships gold medalists (2025) and bronze medalists (2022), five-time U.S. junior national medalists and the 2024, 2025 National Champions. They were also the first U.S. team to win gold medal at World Junior Championships and two Challenger Series competitions within the same season (2024, 2025, 2026).

== Programs ==
=== Senior ===
Competition programs by season
Season	Short program	Free skate program
2022–23	Hypnosis – Oasis of Tranquility: by Karl Hugo	Britney Spears medley: by Britney Spears
2024–25	"Bad To The Bone": by 2Wei	Music from Les Miserables
2025–26	"O Mio Babbino Caro": by Giacomo Puccini, Vincent Ott	"Eye Of The Storm": by Lucas King

=== Junior ===
Competition programs by season
Season	Short program	Free skate program
2018–19	"Survivor": by 2Wei	Music from the Romeo and Juliet Soundtrack: by various artists
2019–20	"Ain't No Sunshine": by J2	"Sound of Silence": by Disturbed
2021–22	Theme – Ouija	Missy Elliott medley
2022–23	"Dangerous": by Michael Jackson; "El Tango de Roxanne": by José Feliciano, Jacek Koman, Ewan McGregor	"Let's Get It Started", "Hey Mamma", "Pump It": by Black Eyed Peas
2023–24	Moonlight Sonata: by Ludwig van Beethoven, District 78	"Snake Charmers": by District 78
2024–25	"Lacrimosa Epic Version (Mozart)": by Samuel Kim; "Orlus Animarum": by Karl Hugo	"Swan Lake (Epic Trailer Version)": by Hidden Citizens; "Black Swan Swan Lake": by District 78; "Perfection", "Ninas Dream": by Clint Mansell
2025–26	"I will always love you": by Whitney Houston	Music from Carmen: by Georges Bizet, Vincent Ott

== Competitive highlights ==
=== Synchronized skating ===
==== Senior results ====
International
Event	22–23	23–24	24–25	25–26
French Cup	1st	(did not compete)		
Hevelius Cup		(did not compete)	2nd	
International Classic		(did not compete)		6th CS
Marie Lundmark Trophy		(did not compete)		8th CS
Neuchâtel Trophy	4th CS	(did not compete)		
Santa Claus Cup		(did not compete)		5th
National
U.S. Champs	4th	(did not compete)		4th
CS - Denotes challenger series competitions

==== Junior results ====
International
Event	18–19	19–20	20–21	21–22	22–23	23–24	24–25	25–26
World Junior Championships			(events not held)	3rd		4th	1st	5th
Britannia Cup			(events not held)					1st CS
Budapest Cup			(events not held)			1st CS		
Dresden Cup			(events not held)				1st CS	
French Cup		5th	(events not held)	1st CS				
Hevelius Cup			(events not held)	3rd CS		1st CS		
International Classic			(events not held)				1st CS	1st CS
Neuchâtel Trophy			(events not held)		2nd CS			
Santa Claus Cup			(events not held)				2nd	1st
Spring Cup	1st	2nd	(events not held)		4th CS			
National
U.S. Champs	3rd	2nd	(event not held)	2nd	4th	1st	1st	1st
CS - Denotes challenger series competitions

=== Synchro9 ===
==== Junior results ====
International
Event	26–27
Synchro9 International Competition (USA)	1st
