= 2019–20 synchronized skating season =

Competitive synchronized skating year from 2019/7/1 to 2020/6/30

- Date: July 1, 2019 – June 30, 2020
- Previous: 2018–19
- Next: 2020–21

The 2019–20 synchronized skating season began on July 1, 2019, and ended on June 30, 2020. Running concurrent with the 2019–20 figure skating season. During this season, elite synchronized skating teams were set to compete in the ISU Championship level at the 2020 World Championships which were cancelled due to the COVID-19 pandemic, and through the Challenger Series. They also competed at various other elite level international and national competitions

== Competitions ==
The 2019–20 season included the following major competitions.

Key

ISU Championships	Challenger Series	Other international	Nationals

Date	Event	Type	Level	Location	Details
2019
October 3-5	Shanghai Trophy	Other int	Senior	Shanghai, China	Details
October 11-13	Finlandia Trophy	Other int.	Senior	Espoo, Finland	Details
November 6-9	California Cup	Challenger	Sen.-Nov.	Irvine, USA	Details
November 29-30	Asia Trophy	Challenger	Sen.-Nov.	Hong Kong, HK	(Event cancelled)
December 5-8	Riga Amber Cup	Other int	Sen.-Nov.	Riga, Latvia	Details
December 13-15	Lumière Cup	Other int	Sen.-Nov.	Eindhoven, Netherlands	Details
2020
January 11-12	Britannia Cup	Other int	Sen.-Nov.	Nottingham, England	Details
January 17-19	Zagreb Snowflakes Trophy	Other int	Sen.-Nov.	Zagreb, Croatia	Details
January 17-19	Russian Synchronized Skating Championship	Nats	Sen.-Jun	Saransk, Russia	Details
January 18-19	Hevelius Cup	Other int	Sen.-Nov.	Gdansk, Poland	Details
January 24-26	Leon Lurje Trophy	Challenger	Sen.-Nov.	Gothenburg, Sweden	Details
Jan 31-Feb 2	French Cup	Challenger	Sen.-Nov.	Rouen, France	Details
February 7-8	Neuchâtel Trophy	Other int	Sen.-Nov.	Neuchâtel, Switzerland	(Event cancelled)
February 7-9	Trophy D'Ecosse	Other int	Sen.-Nov.	Dumfries, England	Details
February 14- 16	Spring Cup	Challenger	Sen.-Nov.	Sesto San Giovanni, Italy	Details
February 21-23	Canadian Synchronized Skating Championships	Nats	Sen.-Nov.	Calgary, Canada	Details
February 22-23	Swedish Synchronized Skating Championships	Nats	Sen.-Nov.	Kungsbacka, Sweden	Details
Feb 26-Mar 1	U.S. Synchronized Skating Championships	Nats	Sen.-Nov.	Providence, USA	Details
Feb 29-Mar 1	Finnish Synchronized Skating Championships	Nats	Sen.-Nov.	Helsinki, Finland	Details
Feb 27-Mar 1	Budapest Cup	Other int	Sen.-Nov.	Budapest, Hungary	(Event cancelled)
March 7-9	Steel City Trophy	Other int	Sen.-Nov.	Sheffield, England	Details
March 13-15	ISU World Junior Synchronized Skating Championships	ISU Championships	Junior	Nottingham, England	Details
April 3-5	ISU World Synchronized Skating Championships	ISU Championships	Senior	Lake Placid, USA	(Event cancelled)
Type: ISU Champ. = ISU Championships; Other int. = International events except ISU Championships; Nats. = National championships Levels: Sen. = Senior; Jun. = Junior; Nov. = Novice

== International medalists ==
Championships
Competition	Gold	Silver	Bronze	Results
Worlds	(Event not held)			
Junior Worlds	(Finland) Team Fintastic	(Russia) Team Junost	(Russia) Team Crystal Ice	
Challenger Series
California Cup	(Finland) Rockettes	(United States) Haydenettes	(Canada) Les Suprêmes	
Asia Trophy	(Event not held)			
Leon Lurje Trophy	(Russia) Team Paradise	(Finland) Team Unique	(Russia) Team Crystal Ice	
French Cup	(Finland) Rockettes	(Finland) Marigold IceUnity	(Canada) Les Suprêmes	
Spring Cup	(Finland) Team Unique	(Finland) Marigold IceUnity	(Canada) NEXXICE	
Other senior internationals
Competition	Gold	Silver	Bronze	Results
Shanghai Trophy	(Australia) Team Unity	(China) Team Ice Pearl	(Finland) Rockettes	
Finlandia Trophy	(Russia) Team Paradise	(Finland) Rockettes	(Finland) Team Unique	
Riga Amber Cup	(Czech Republic) Team Olympia	(Czech Republic) Team Darlings	(Latvia) Team Amber	
Lumière Cup	(Finland) Marigold IceUnity	(France) Les Zoulous	(Germany) Skating Graces	
Britannia Cup	(United States) Haydenettes	(United States) Adrian College	(Italy) Hot Shivers	
Zagreb Snowflakes Trophy	(United States) Skyliners	(United States) Adrian College	(Czech Republic) Team Darlings	
Hevelius Cup	(Finland) Team Unique	(Finland) Rockettes	(Germany) Skating Graces	
Neuchâtel Trophy	(Event not held)			
Trophy D'Ecosse	(Australia) Nova	(United Kingdom) Zariba	(No other competitors)	
Budapest Cup	(Event not held)			
Steel City Trophy	(Russia) Team Crystal Ice	(Netherlands) Team Illumination	(Belgium) Team Phoenix	
