= Team Unique =

Senior-level synchronized skating team

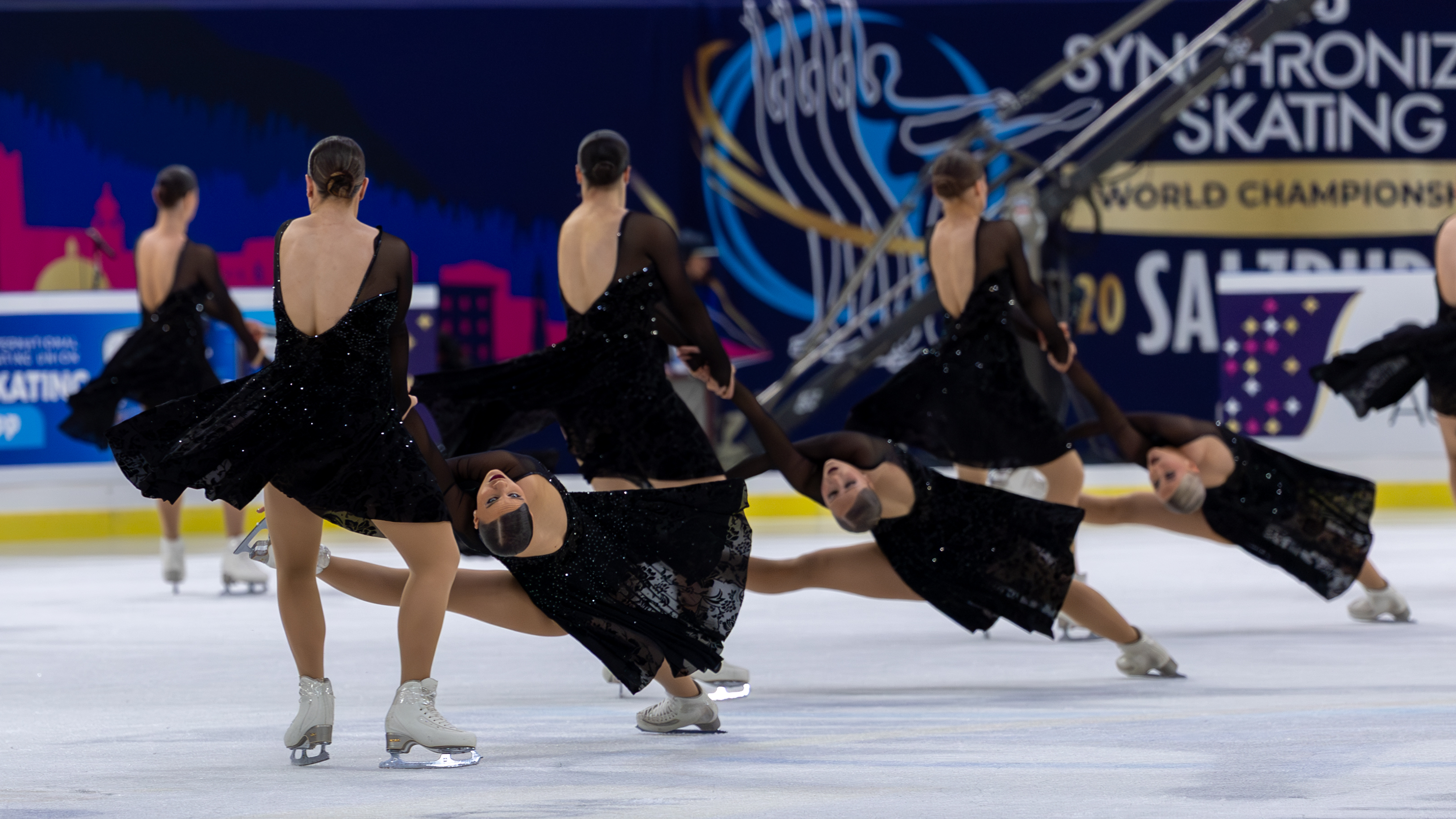
- Team Unique of Finland free skate program at the 2026 ISU Synchronized Skating World Championships in Salzburg

Team information
- Country represented: Finland
- Formed: 1993
- Home town: Helsinki, Finland
- Coach: Mirjami Penttinen
- Skating club: Helsingfors Skridskoklubb
- Level: Senior
- World standing: 2

ISU team best scores
- Combined total: 237.44; 2026 Britannia Cup
- Short program: 83.22; 2026 Hevelius Cup
- Free skate: 164,60; 2020 Spring Cup
Medal record
Representing Finland
Synchronized skating
World Championships
Gold medal – first place	2013 Boston	Synchronized skating
Silver medal – second place	2009 Zagreb	Synchronized skating
Silver medal – second place	2025 Helsinki	Synchronized skating
Bronze medal – third place	2023 Lake Placid	Synchronized skating

Team Unique is a senior-level synchronized skating team from Helsinki, Finland. The team are the 2013 World champions, two-time World silver medalists (2009, 2025) and World bronze medalists (2023) and four-time Finnish champions (2013, 2016, 2023, 2025). As of March 2026, the team is ranked first in the International Skating Union world standings.

The team represents the figure skating club Helsingfors Skridskoklubb (HSK). It is also the home club to the junior team Team Mystique.

== History ==
Team Unique was established in 1993 and has competed at the senior level since 1996. The team has won four medals at the World level: gold in 2013, silver in 2009 and 2025, and bronze in 2023.

In spring 2026, the team also won the ISU Challenger Series, a title it previously secured in 2020. In 2020, the team was also selected to represent Finland in the World Championships, but due to the COVID-19 pandemic, the event was called off.

Team Unique won the Finnish champion titles in 2013, 2016, 2023 and 2025, and in 2026 the team won the season‑long SynchroTour in Finland.

== Programs ==
	Short program	Free program
2026–27	Concerto pour la fin d'un amour by Hauser; Bridge Over Troubled Water by John Legend	American David by Bono, Elliott Wheeler; Trouble by Austin Butler; Hound Dog by Austin Butler; Jailhouse Rock by Elvis Presley; If I Can Dream by Elvis Presley
2025–26	Nothing Compares TU	Piaf
2024–25	This Is Unique	He Had It Coming
2023–24	Let It Be	Lacrime d’Amore
2022–23	It ain’t over	Unbearable Lightness of Being
2021–22	Merci	A star is born
2020–21	NOW.	Garden of Eden
2019–20	Bad QUE	Betrayed
2018–19	Muzic makez me...	Insomnia
2017–18	NocTUrne	Every Inch of You
2016–17	TU Goes Ramalama	Inside of us
2015–16	Peace of Mind	Empty Promises
2014–15	Free Your Mind	The Hunger Games
2013–14	Great Balls of Fire	Wild and Free
2012–13	TU Flow	"Living Proof" The Help (soundtrack)
2011–12	Hallelujah	Revenge
2010–11	All That Jazz	Phantom of the Opera
2009–10	Fortune-Tellers	La Strada
2008–09	W.O.M.A.N.	Story of Turandot

== Competitive highlights ==
Competition placements since the 2019-20 season
Season	2019-20	2020-21	2021-22	2022-23	2023-24	2024-25	2025-26
World Championships	C	C		3rd	4th	2nd	4th
Finnish Championships	2nd		4th	1st	3rd	1st	2nd
Britannia Cup							1st (CS)
Budapest Cup					4th (CS)		
French Cup					2nd	3rd (CS)	
Hevelius Cup	1st						1st
Lumière Cup				1st			
Marie Lundmark Trophy					3rd (CS)		3rd (CS)
Neuchâtel Trophy			3rd				
Santa Claus Cup						1st	1st
Spring Cup	1st (CS)			2nd (CS)			
US International Classic						2nd (CS)	
Leon Lurje Trophy	2nd (CS)						
Mozart Cup				4th (CS)			

Competition placements between the 2006-07 and 2018-19 season
Season	2006-07	2007-08	2008-09	2009-10	2010-11	2011-12	2012-13	2013-14	2014-15	2015-16	2016-17	2017-18	2018-19
World Championships	5th		2nd				1st			4th		4th	
Finnish Championships	2nd	3rd	2nd	3rd	3rd	3rd	1st	3rd	3rd	1st	3rd	3rd	3rd
Cup of Berlin							1st		2nd				
Finlandia Cup		3rd		3rd									
Finlandia Trophy							1st	1st	3rd	4th	3rd	4th	3rd
French Cup	1st	2nd	1st	2nd	1st	1st	1st	1st	3rd	3rd	3rd	2nd	4th
Leon Lurje Trophy								1st					
Mozart Cup						4th							4th
Neuchâtel Trophy										3rd		2nd	
Prague Cup	2nd		2nd										
Winter Universiade													1st

Competitive results 1998–99 to 2005–06

National
Event	1998–99	1999–00	2000–01	2001–02	2002–03	2003–04	2004–05	2005–06
1st Finnish Championships; Qualifier						2nd	2nd	3rd
2nd Finnish Championships; Qualifier						3rd	3rd	3rd
Finnish Championships	3rd	3rd	3rd	3rd	2nd	3rd	3rd	3rd
International
Event	1998–99	1999–00	2000–01	2001–02	2002–03	2003–04	2004–05	2005–06
World Championships	(not held)	DNQ	DNQ	6th	4th	DNQ	DNQ	DNQ
Cup of Berlin							3rd	
Finlandia Cup		4th		2nd		3rd		
French Cup	4th	2nd		1st	2nd		2nd	3rd
Prague Cup						2nd		
DNQ = did not qualify

== Media appearances ==
Team Unique performed on the season one of the Finnish Dancing on Ice on 2 November 2013. They also appeared as background skaters in the December 2013 music video for "Selvästi päihtynyt" by Finnish pop singer Jenni Vartiainen.
