= 2021–22 synchronized skating season =

Competitive synchronized skating year from 2021/7/1 to 2022/6/30

- Date: July 1, 2021 – June 30, 2022
- Previous: 2020–21
- Next: 2022–23

The 2021–22 synchronized skating season began on July 1, 2021, and ended on June 30, 2022, running concurrently with the 2021–22 figure skating season. During this season, elite synchronized skating teams competed in the ISU Championship level at the 2022 World Championships, and through the Challenger Series. They also competed at various other elite level international and national competitions.

From March 1, 2022 onwards, the International Skating Union banned all athletes and officials from Russia and Belarus from attending any international competitions due to the 2022 Russian invasion of Ukraine.

== Competitions ==
The 2021–22 season included the following major competitions.

Key

ISU Championships	Challenger Series	Other international

Date	Event	Type	Level	Location	Details
2021
October 8–10	Finlandia Trophy	Other int.	Senior	Espoo, Finland	Results
December 17 – 18	Santa Claus Cup	Other int	Sen. - Nov.	Brno, Czech Republic	Results
2022
January 6 – 8	Hevelius Cup	Challenger	Sen. - Jun.	Gdansk, Poland	Results
January 13 - 16	Lumière Cup	Challenger	Sen. - Jun.	Eindhoven, Netherlands	Results
January 20 – 23	Marie Lundmark Trophy	Challenger	Sen. - Jun.	Turku, Finland	Results
January 20 – 23	Marie Lundmark Trophy	Other int	Novice	Turku, Finland	Results
January 28 – 30	Mozart Cup	Other int	Sen. - Nov.	Salzburg, Austria	Results
February 4 - 5	French Cup	Challenger	Sen. - Jun.	Rouen, France	Results
February 10 - 12	Neuchâtel Trophy	Other int	Sen. - Nov.	Neuchâtel, Switzerland	Results
March 17 – 19	ISU World Junior Synchronized Skating Championships	ISU Championships	Junior	Innsbruck, Austria	Results
April 7 – 9	ISU World Synchronized Skating Championships	ISU Championships	Senior	Hamilton, Canada	Results
Type: ISU Champ. = ISU Championships; Other int. = International events except ISU Championships; Levels: Sen. = Senior; Jun. = Junior; Nov. = Novice

=== Cancelled Events ===
Date	Event	Type	Level	Location	Details
2022
January 15 – 16	Britannia Cup	Other int	Sen. - Nov.	Nottingham, England	(Event Cancelled)
January 27 – 28	Leon Lurje Trophy	Other int	Sen. Jun. Nov.	Gothenburg, Sweden	(Event cancelled)
January 28 – 29	U.S. Synchronized Skating International Classic	Challenger	Sen. - Jun.	Boston, USA	(Event cancelled)
February 3 - 5	Zagreb Snowflakes Trophy	Other int	Sen. - Nov.	Zagreb, Croatia	(Event cancelled)
February 11 – 13	Trophy D'Ecosse	Other int	Sen. - Nov.	Dumfries, Scotland	(Event cancelled)
February 18 – 20	Spring Cup	Other int	Sen. - Nov.	Sesto San Giovanni, Italy	(Event cancelled)
March 1 – 3	Budapest Cup	Other int	Sen. - Nov.	Budapest, Hungary	(Event cancelled)
Type: ISU Champ. = ISU Championships; Other int. = International events except ISU Championships; Levels: Sen. = Senior; Jun. = Junior; Nov. = Novice

== International medalists ==
Championships
Competition	Gold	Silver	Bronze	Results
Worlds	(Canada) Les Suprêmes	(Finland) Marigold IceUnity	(Finland) Rockettes	
Junior Worlds	(Finland) Team Fintastic	(United States) Skyliners	(United States) Teams Elite	
Challenger Series
Hevelius Cup	(Russia) Tatarstan	(Russia) Team Crystal Ice	(Finland) Team Dream Edges	
Lumière Cup	(Russia) Team Paradise	(Russia) Team Crystal Ice	(France) Les Zoulous	
Marie Lundmark Trophy	(Finland) Rockettes	(Finland) Team Unique	(Russia) Team Junost	
French Cup	(Finland) Rockettes	(United States) Skyliners	(Hungary) Team Passion	
Other International
Competition	Gold	Silver	Bronze	Results
Finlandia Trophy	(Russia) Team Paradise	(Finland) Rockettes	(Finland) Team Unique	
Santa Claus Cup	(Germany) Team Berlin 1	(Czech Republic) Team Darlings	(Italy) Hot Shivers	
Marie Lundmark Trophy novice only	(Russia) Sunrise-2	(Finland) Finettes	(Finland) Team Dynamique	
Mozart Cup	(Germany) Team Berlin 1	(Czech Republic) Olympia	(Germany) United Angles	
Neuchâtel Trophy	(Russia) Team Paradise	(Finland) Marigold IceUnity	(Finland) Team Unique	
