= 2004–05 synchronized skating season =

Competitive synchronized skating year from 2004/7/1 to 2005/6/30

- Date: July 1, 2004 – June 30, 2005
- Previous: 2003–04
- Next: 2005–06

The 2004–05 synchronized skating season began on July 1, 2004, and ended on June 30, 2005. During this season, which was concurrent with the season for the other four disciplines (men's single, ladies' single, pair skating and ice dancing), elite synchronized skating teams competed on the International Skating Union (ISU) Championship level at the 2005 World Championships and Junior World Challenge Cup. They also competed at various other international as well as national synchronized skating competitions.

== Competitions ==
The 2004–05 season included the following competitions:

Key

ISU Championships	Other international	Nationals

Date	Event	Type	Level	Location	Details
2005
January 20–22	Cup of Berlin	Other int.	Sen., Jun.	Berlin, Germany	Details
January 29–30	Prague Cup	Other int.	Sen., Jun.	Prague, Czech Republic	Details
February 4–6	French Cup	Other int.	Sen., Jun., Nov.	Rouen, France	Details
February 12–13	11th Spring Cup	Other int.	Sen., Jun., Nov.	Milan, Italy	Details
February 24–26	Zagreb Snowflakes Trophy	Other int.	Sen., Jun., Nov.	Zagreb, Croatia	Details
March 10–13	Junior World Challenge Cup	Other int.	Junior	Neuchâtel, Switzerland	Details
April 22—23	World Championships	ISU Champ.	Senior	Gothenburg, Sweden	Details
Type: ISU Champ. = ISU Championships; Other int. = International events except ISU Championships; Nats. = National championships Levels: Sen. = Senior; Jun. = Junior; Nov. = Novice

== International medalists ==
Championships and major cups
Competition	Gold	Silver	Bronze	Source
World Championships	(Sweden) Team Surprise	(Finland) Rockettes	(Finland) Marigold IceUnity	
Junior World Challenge Cup	(Finland) Musketeers	(Finland) Team Mystique	(Canada) Gold Ice	
Other senior internationals
Competition	Gold	Silver	Bronze	Source
Cup of Berlin	(Finland) Rockettes	(Germany) Team Berlin 1	(Finland) Team Unique	
Prague Cup	(Finland) Marigold IceUnity	(Finland) Rockettes	(United States) Haydenettes	
French Cup	(Finland) Marigold IceUnity	(Finland) Team Unique	(Russia) Paradise	
12th Spring Cup	(Sweden) Team Surprise	(Germany) Team Berlin 1	(United States) Miami University	
Zagreb Snowflakes Trophy	(Finland) Steps on Ice	(Germany) Skating Mystery	(Czech Republic) Olympia	

== Season's best scores ==
=== Senior teams – 6.0 system ===
Rank	Name	Country	Best: free skating (average score of SP* and FS** combined)	Event	Best: short program (average score*)	Event	Best: free skating (average score**)	Event
1	Marigold IceUnity	(Finland)	22.46	French Cup	11.20	French Cup	11.26	French Cup
2	Team Surprise	(Sweden)	22.43	Spring Cup	11.00	Spring Cup	11.43	Spring Cup
3	Rockettes	(Finland)	21.73	Cup of Berlin	10.67	Cup of Berlin	11.06	Cup of Berlin
4	Team Unique	(Finland)	21.51	French Cup	10.81	French Cup	10.70	French Cup
5	Miami University	(United States)	20.60	Spring Cup	10.10	Spring Cup	10.50	Spring Cup
*all judges' combined points (for required elements and presentation) put together, divided by number of judges **all judges' combined points (for technical merit and presentation) put together, divided by number of judges
