= 2022–23 synchronized skating season =

Competitive synchronized skating year from 2022/7/1 to 2023/6/30

- Date: July 1, 2022 – June 30, 2023
- Previous: 2021–22
- Next: 2023–24

The 2022–23 synchronized skating season began on July 1, 2022 and ended on June 30, 2023, running concurrent with the 2022–23 figure skating season. During this season, elite synchronized skating teams competed in the ISU Championship level at the 2023 World Championships and through the Challenger Series. They also competed at various other elite level international and national competitions.

From March 1, 2022 onwards, the International Skating Union banned all athletes and officials from Russia and Belarus from attending any international competitions due to the 2022 Russian invasion of Ukraine.

== Competitions ==
The 2022–23 season included the following major competitions.

Key

ISU Championships	Challenger Series	Other international

Date	Event	Type	Level	Location	Details
2022
August 26-28	Sydney Synchronized Festival	Other int	Sen. - Nov.	Erina, Australia	Results
November 8-13	Tallinn Trophy	Other int	Sen. - Jun.	Tallinn, Estonia	(Event cancelled)
December 8 – 11	Lumière Cup	Other int	Sen. - Nov.	Eindhoven, Netherlands	Results
December 9-11	Challenger Series Canada	Challenger	Sen. - Jun.	Brampton, Canada	(Event cancelled)
December 15-17	Riga Amber Cup	Other int	Sen. - Nov.	Riga, Latvia	Results
December 17 – 18	Santa Claus Cup	Other int	Sen. - Nov.	Brno, Czech Republic	Results
December 16-18	Trophy D'Ecosse	Other int	Sen. - Nov.	Dumfries, England	Results
2023
January 13 – 15	Neuchâtel Trophy	Challenger	Sen. - Jun.	Neuchâtel, Switzerland	Results
January 13 – 15	Neuchâtel Trophy	Other int	Novice	Neuchâtel, Switzerland	Results
January 14 - 15	Britannia Cup	Other int	Sen. - Nov.	Nottingham, England	Results
January 19 – 21	Mozart Cup	Challenger	Sen. - Nov.	Salzburg, Austria	Results
January 27 – 29	Leon Lurje Trophy	Challenger	Sen. - Jun.	Gothenburg, Sweden	Results
January 27 – 29	Leon Lurje Trophy	Other int	Novice	Gothenburg, Sweden	Results
February 3 - 4	French Cup	Other int	Sen. - Nov.	Rouen, France	Results
February 9 - 11	Hevelius Cup	Other int	Sen. - Nov.	Gdansk, Poland	Results
February 10 - 11	Zagreb Snowflakes Trophy	Other int	Sen. - Nov.	Zagreb, Croatia	(Event Cancelled)
February 11 - 12	Cup of Neuss	Other int	Sen. - Nov.	Neuss, Germany	Results
February 17- 19	Spring Cup	Challenger	Sen. - Jun.	Sesto San Giovanni, Italy	Results
March 3-5	Budapest Cup	Other int	Sen. - Nov.	Budapest, Hungary	(Event Cancelled)
March 3-6	Steel City Trophy	Other int	Sen. - Nov.	Sheffield, England	Results
March 10 – 11	ISU World Junior Synchronized Skating Championships	ISU Championships	Junior	Angers, France	Results
March 31 – April 1	ISU World Synchronized Skating Championships	ISU Championships	Senior	Lake Placid, USA	Results
Type: ISU Champ. = ISU Championships; Other int. = International events except ISU Championships; Levels: Sen. = Senior; Jun. = Junior; Nov. = Novice TBA = To be announced

== International medalists ==
Championships
Competition	Gold	Silver	Bronze	Results
Worlds	(Canada) Les Suprêmes	(Finland) Rockettes	(Finland) Team Unique	
Junior Worlds	(Finland) Team Fintastic	(Canada) NEXXICE	(United States) Skyliners	

Challenger Series
Competition	Gold	Silver	Bronze	Results
Neuchâtel Trophy	(Finland) Helsinki Rockettes	(Finland) Marigold IceUnity	(United States) Skyliners	
Mozart Cup	(Canada) NEXXICE	(United States) Haydenettes	(Finland) Dream Edges	
Leon Lurje Trophy	(Finland) Helsinki Rockettes	(Finland) Marigold IceUnity	(Canada) Les Suprêmes	
Spring Cup	(Canada) Les Suprêmes	(Finland) Team Unique	(Canada) NEXXICE	

Challenger Series Junior
Competition	Gold	Silver	Bronze	Results
Neuchâtel Trophy	(Finland) Team Fintastic	(United States) Teams Elite	(Finland) Dream Edges	
Mozart Cup	(United States) Skyliners	(Finland) Team Musketeers	(Finland) Team Mystique	
Leon Lurje Trophy	(Finland) Team Fintastic	(Canada) Les Suprêmes	(United States) Skyliners	
Spring Cup	(United States) Lexettes	(Canada) Les Suprêmes	(Canada) Nexxice	

Other International
Competition	Gold	Silver	Bronze	Results
Sydney Synchronized Festival	(Australia) Team Unity	(Australia) Ice Storm	(no other competitors)	
Lumière Cup	(Finland) Team Unique	(Finland) Dream Edges	(Czech Republic) Olympia	
Riga Amber Cup	(Finland) Helsinki Rockettes	(Germany) United Angels	(Latvia) Team Amber	
Santa Claus Cup	(Germany) Team Berlin 1	(Italy) Ice on Fire	(Hungary) Team Passion	
Trophy D'Ecosse				
Britannia Cup	(United Kingdom) Team Icicles	(No other competitors)		
French Cup	(United States) Teams Elite	(Canada) Nova	(France) Les Zoulous	
Hevelius Cup	(Finland) Marigold IceUnity	(United States) Adrian College	(Poland) Ice Fire	
Cup of Neuss	(Germany) Team Berlin 1	(Germany) United Angels	(Switzerland) Starlight Elite	
Steel City Trophy	(United Kingdom) Team Icicles	(No other competitors)		
