= 2023–24 synchronized skating season =

Competitive synchronized skating year from 2023/7/1 to 2024/6/30

- Date: July 1, 2023 – June 30, 2024
- Previous: 2022–23
- Next: 2024–25

The 2023–24 synchronized skating season began on July 1, 2023, and ended on June 30, 2024, running concurrent with the 2023–24 figure skating season. During this season, elite synchronized skating teams competed in the ISU Championship level at the 2024 World Championships and through the Challenger Series. They also competed at various other elite level international and national competitions.

From March 1, 2022, onwards, the International Skating Union banned all athletes and officials from Russia and Belarus from attending any international competitions due to the 2022 Russian invasion of Ukraine.

== Competitions ==
The 2023–24 season included the following major competitions.

Key

ISU Championships	Challenger Series	Other international

Date	Event	Type	Level	Location	Details
2023
September 15–17	Sydney Synchronized Festival	Other int	Sen. - Nov.	Sydney	Results
October 3 – 5	Shanghai Trophy	Other int	Senior	Shanghai	Results
October 4–8	Finlandia Trophy	Other int	Senior	Espoo	Results
December 16 – 17	Santa Claus Cup	Other int	Sen. - Nov.	Brno	Results
2024
January 11–14	Lumière Cup	Challenger	Sen. - Jun.	Eindhoven	Results
January 11–14	Lumière Cup	Other int	Novice	Eindhoven	Results
January 18 – 20	Mozart Cup	Other int	Sen. - Nov.	Salzburg	Results
January 19–21	Budapest Cup	Challenger	Sen. - Jun.	Budapest	Results
January 26 – 27	Trophy D'Ecosse	Challenger	Sen. - Jun.	Dumfries	Results
January 26 – 27	Trophy D'Ecosse	Other int	Novice	Dumfries	Results
February 1–3	French Cup	Other int	Sen. - Nov.	Rouen	Results
February 2–4	Hevelius Cup	Challenger	Sen. - Jun.	Gdańsk	Results
February 2–4	Hevelius Cup	Other int	Novice	Gdańsk	Results
February 10–11	Marie Lundmark Trophy	Challenger	Sen. - Nov.	Helsinki	Results
February 23–24	Dresden Cup	Other int	Sen. - Nov.	Dresden	Results
March 1–3	Steel City Trophy	Other int	Sen. - Nov.	Sheffield	Results
March 15 – 16	ISU World Junior Synchronized Skating Championships	ISU Championships	Junior	Neuchâtel	Results
April 5 – 6	ISU World Synchronized Skating Championships	ISU Championships	Senior	Zagreb	Results
Type: ISU Champ. = ISU Championships; Other int. = International events except ISU Championships; Nats. = National championships Levels: Sen. = Senior; Jun. = Junior; Nov. = Novice TBA = To be announced

=== Cancelled Events ===
Date	Event	Type	Level	Location	Details
2023
December 14 – 17	Riga Amber Cup	Other int	Sen. - Nov.	Riga	(Event cancelled)
2024
January 13 – 14	Britannia Cup	Other int	Sen. - Nov.	TBA	(Event cancelled)
January 25 – 28	Leon Lurje Trophy	Other int	Sen. - Nov.	Gothenburg	(Event cancelled)
February 8–10	Open International	Other int	Sen. - Jun.	Lyon	(Event cancelled)
February 9–10	Zagreb Snowflakes Trophy	Other int	Sen. - Nov.	Zagreb	(Event cancelled)
February 16–18	Spring Cup	Other int	Sen. - Nov.	Sesto San Giovanni	(Event cancelled)
Type: ISU Champ. = ISU Championships; Other int. = International events except ISU Championships; Levels: Sen. = Senior; Jun. = Junior; Nov. = Novice

== International medalists ==
Championships
Competition	Gold	Silver	Bronze	Results
Worlds	(Canada) Les Suprêmes	(United States) Haydenettes	(Finland) Helsinki Rockettes	
Junior Worlds	(Canada) Les Suprêmes	(Finland) Team Fintastic	(United States) Skyliners	

Challenger Series
Competition	Gold	Silver	Bronze	Results
Lumière Cup	(Finland) Marigold IceUnity	(United States) Skyliners	(Finland) Lumineers	
Budapest Cup	(Canada) Les Suprêmes	(United States) Haydenettes	(Finland) Helsinki Rockettes	
Trophy D'Ecosse	(United Kingdom) Team Icicles	(Sweden) Team Inspire	(No other competitors)	
Hevelius Cup	(United States) Haydenettes	(Finland) Marigold IceUnity	(Canada) Nova	
Marie Lundmark Trophy	(Finland) Helsinki Rockettes	(Canada) Les Suprêmes	(Finland) Team Unique	

Challenger Series Junior
Competition	Gold	Silver	Bronze	Results
Lumière Cup	(United States) Skyliners	(United States) Team Image	(Finland) Team Mystique	
Budapest Cup	(United States) Teams Elite	(Finland) Team Fintastic	(Finland) Dream Edges	
Trophy D'Ecosse	(Finland) Valley Bay Synchro	(United States) Lexettes	(Canada) NEXXICE	
Hevelius Cup	(United States) Teams Elite	(United States) Skyliners	(Canada) Les Suprêmes	
Marie Lundmark Trophy	(Canada) Les Suprêmes	(Finland) Valley Bay Synchro	(Finland) Team Fintastic	

Other International
Competition	Gold	Silver	Bronze	Results
Sydney Synchronized Festival	(Queensland) Ice Storm	(No other competitors)		
Shanghai Trophy	(Germany) Team Berlin 1	(Hungary) Team Passion	(Australia) Team Unity	
Finlandia Trophy _{SP Only}	(Finland) Helsinki Rockettes	(Finland) Marigold IceUnity	(Finland) Team Unique	
Santa Claus Cup	(Italy) Ice on Fire	(Hungary) Team Passion	(Czech Republic) Team Olympia	
Mozart Cup	(Finland) Marigold IceUnity	(Germany) Skating Graces	(No other competitors)	
French Cup	(Finland) Helsinki Rockettes	(Finland) Team Unique	(Queensland) Ice Storm Lightning	
Dresden Cup	(Germany) Team Berlin 1	(Hungary) Team Passion	(Czech Republic) Team Olympia	
Steel City Trophy	(United Kingdom) Team Icicles	(No other competitors)		
