= Black Ice (synchronized skating team) =

black ice

Team information
- Country represented: Canada
- Formed: 1992
- Retired: 2010
- Coach: Cathy Dalton
- Level: Senior

ISU team best scores
- Combined total: 210.90; 2010 Worlds
- Short program: 76.26; 2010 Worlds
- Free skate: 134.64; 2010 Worlds
Medal record
Representing Canada
Synchronized skating
World Championships
Silver medal – second place	2000 Minneapolis	Synchronized skating
Bronze medal – third place	2001 Helsinki	Synchronized skating
Bronze medal – third place	2002 Rouen	Synchronized skating

black ice were a synchronized skating team from Canada. Their senior team were three-time medalists at the World Championships and eight-time Canadian national champions. The team was founded by Cathy Dalton and Susan Pettes. Their junior team won the 2006 French Cup and was 5th at Junior World Challenge Cup that same year. black ice also appeared on the Canadian reality show Say Yes & Marry Me! in 2003, where they helped a man propose to his girlfriend.

On October 20, 2010, black ice announced they were retiring.

== Competitive results ==
National
Event	1999–00	2000–01	2001–02	2002–03	2003–04	2004–05	2005–06	2006–07	2007–08	2008–09	2009–10
Canadian Championships	1st	1st	1st			1st	1st	3rd	3rd	2nd	2nd
Source											
International
Event	1999–00	2000–01	2001–02	2002–03	2003–04	2004–05	2005–06	2006–07	2007–08	2008–09	2009–10
World Championships	2nd	3rd	3rd			6th	6th			5th	4th
Source											
Finlandia Cup	1st										
Source											
Prague Cup									4th		
Source											
