= Spirit of Africa =

Studio album by Kenyan Boys Choir
- Released: June 29, 2009
- Genre: Choral Music
- Length: 50:47
- Label: Universal Music Group; Decca Records

Singles from Spirit of Africa
- 1. "Homeless" Released: June 29, 2009

Professional ratings
Review scores
Source	Rating
Times Online	2009
Daily Express	2009

Spirit of Africa is the first studio album by African traditional and contemporary male voice choir Kenyan Boys Choir. As of July 2009, one single has been released: "Homeless". All tracks were recorded in the city of Nairobi, Kenya.

== Track listing ==
1. "Tuli Tuli" – 3:23
2. "Homeless" – 4:21
3. "Jambo Bwana" – 3:26
4. "Kothbiro" – 4:14
5. "Nkosi Sikelel'i Afrika" – 2:12
6. "Kikererani Lelo (Kapchesan)" – 4:08
7. "Malaika" – 3:53
8. "Asiyo" – 4:03
9. "Soon And Very Soon" – 3:16
10. "Kayra Sillo" – 3:02
11. "Oluwa L'Oluso Agutan Mi (The Lord's my Shepherd)" – 2:38
12. "Obama Yanza Vutswa" – 2:49
13. "Lilova" – 5:10
14. "O Holy Night" - 4:22

== Background ==
'Spirit of Africa' comprises a variety of popular chants and songs from across Africa. The repertoire reflects the choir's egalitarian beliefs, and there are songs from several of the 42 Kenyan tribes as well as from other African nations including Nigeria, South Africa, Uganda, Mali, Senegal and Guinea.
