= Canadian Synchronized Skating Championships =

Annual synchronized skating competition

The Canadian Synchronized Skating Championships are annual synchronized skating events, sanctioned by the Skate Canada, held to determine the national champions of Canada. They were first held in 1983. Since 2000, it is during these events that the senior teams can qualify for the ISU World Synchronized Skating Championships. Starting in 2023, the Junior and Senior level teams competed in a combined synchronized and figure skating championships held as a single event known as the Canadian National Skating Championships.

== Senior medalists ==
Year	Location	Gold	Silver	Bronze	Source(s)
1983		The Supremes (London)	K-W Kweens	Les Pirouettes de Laval	
1984		The Supremes (London)	K-W Kweens	Edmonton Senior Precision Team	
1985		The Supremes (London)	Edmonton Senior Precision	Les Pirouettes	
1986		Edmonton Precision Skating Team	Les Pirouettes	The First Edition	
1987		Les Pirouettes de Laval	K-W Kweens on Ice	Second Edition	
1988		Whitby Ice Fyre	K-W Kweens on Ice	Les Pirouettes de Laval	
1989		Whitby Ice Fyre	Les Pirouettes	Kweens on Ice	
1990		Whitby Ice Fyre	Les Pirouettes	National Capitals	
1991		Les Pirouettes de Laval	Whitby Ice Fyre	National Capital	
1992	Regina, Alberta	Les Pirouettes de Laval	Les Suprêmes	Whitby Ice Fyre	
1993		Les Pirouettes de Laval	Black Ice	Les Suprêmes	
1994		Les Pirouettes de Laval	Black Ice	Les Suprêmes	
1995	Calgary, Alberta	Les Pirouettes de Laval	Black Ice	Whitby Ice Fyre	
1996	Hamilton, Ontario	Kweens on Ice	Whitby Ice Fyre	National Capital (Nepean)	
1997		Black Ice	Les Pirouettes	Kweens on Ice	
1998		Black Ice	Les Pirouettes	Burlington Ice Image	
1999		Black Ice	Ice Image	Les Pirouettes	
2000	Kitchener, Ontario	Black Ice	Burlington Ice Image	Les Pirouettes	
2001	Hull, Quebec	Black Ice	Les Suprêmes	NEXXICE	
2002	Kitchener, Ontario	Black Ice	Les Suprêmes	Stanford and Company	
2003	Montreal, Quebec	Les Suprêmes	Fusion	NEXXICE	
2004	Brandon, Manitoba	Les Suprêmes	Fusion	NEXXICE	
2005	Sarnia, Ontario	Black Ice	Les Suprêmes	NEXXICE	
2006	Hamilton, Ontario	Black Ice	NEXXICE	Les Suprêmes	
2007	Chicoutimi, Quebec	NEXXICE	Les Suprêmes	Black Ice	
2008	Chilliwack, British Columbia	NEXXICE	Les Suprêmes	Black Ice	
2009	Oshawa, Ontario	NEXXICE	Black Ice	Les Suprêmes	
2010	Brampton, Ontario	NEXXICE	Black Ice	Les Suprêmes	
2011	Brampton, Ontario	NEXXICE	Les Suprêmes	Fusion	
2012	Windsor, Ontario	NEXXICE	Les Suprêmes	Xcellence	
2013	Calgary, Alberta	NEXXICE	Les Suprêmes	Edge	
2014	Burnaby, British Columbia	NEXXICE	Les Suprêmes	Edge	
2015	Québec City, Québec	NEXXICE	Les Suprêmes	Meraki	
2016	Waterloo, Ontario	Les Suprêmes	NEXXICE	Meraki	
2017	Calgary, Alberta	NEXXICE	Les Suprêmes	Nova	
2018	Oshawa, Ontario	NEXXICE	Les Suprêmes	Nova	
2019	Waterloo, Ontario	Nova	NEXXICE	Les Suprêmes	
2020	Calgary, Alberta	Les Suprêmes	NEXXICE	Nova	
2021	(Event not held)				
2022	Calgary, Alberta	Les Suprêmes	NEXXICE	Nova	
