= Reliable Source Music =

British music production company

Reliable Source Music Ltd.
- Industry: Music
- Genre: Various
- Founded: 1997
- Headquarters: London, United Kingdom
- Products: Music
- Website: reliable-source.co.uk

Reliable Source Music (RSM) is a UK music production and publishing company that provides music to media professionals. RSM creates music for advertising, TV, video, radio, film, multimedia, and corporate use, either off the shelf or written to order. As of March 2019, the company had a library of over 100,000 tracks. This includes RSM's music and sub-publishing deals with other music libraries worldwide.

== Key staff ==
The company was established in 1997 by Dr. Wayne Bickerton, the managing director until November 2015. Following the passing of Dr. Wayne Bickerton in November 2015, the company was sold to Intervox Production Music in October 2017. In January 2019, Martin Weinert was hired as the chairman of the board of Directors alongside Kenny Orr and Gilda Fulco as Directors.

== Notable clients ==
Reliable Source Music has provided music to many TV programs, including Top Gear, The X-Files, A Question of Sport, EastEnders, and Doctor Who Confidential. RSM has also supplied music for advertising campaigns for companies such as Easyjet, Johnnie Walker, Persil, and Vodafone.

== Composers ==
Several composers have worked for the company, including Brian Bennett, John Cameron and Wayne Bickerton, founders of the company and composers of successful songs throughout the 1970s.
