= Helsinki Rockettes =

Senior-level synchronized skating team

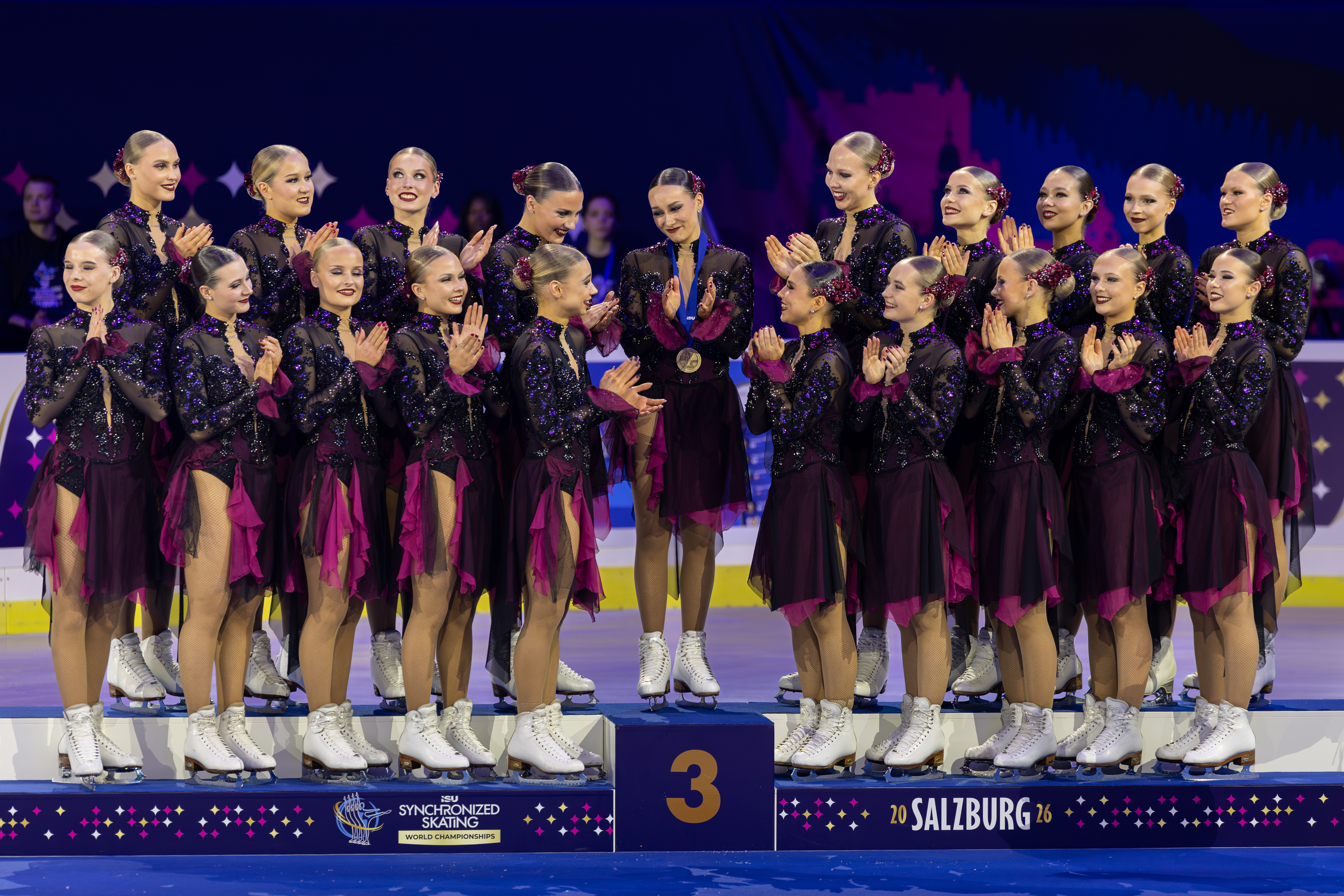
- Team Helsinki Rockettes on the podium at the 2026 ISU Synchronized Skating World Championships.

Team information
- Country represented: Finland
- Formed: 1984
- Home town: Helsinki, Finland
- Coach: Kaisa Arrateig
- Skating club: Helsingin Taitoluisteluklubi
- Level: Senior
- World standing: 1

ISU team best scores
- Combined total: 239.56; 2023 Worlds
- Short program: 84.74; 2019 French Cup
- Free skate: 161.09; 2023 Leon Lurje Trophy
Medal record
Representing Finland
Synchronized skating
World Championships
Gold medal – first place	2008 Budapest	Synchronized skating
Gold medal – first place	2010 Colorado Springs	Synchronized skating
Gold medal – first place	2011 Helsinki	Synchronized skating
Gold medal – first place	2025 Helsinki	Synchronized skating
Silver medal – second place	2001 Helsinki	Synchronized skating
Silver medal – second place	2005 Gothenburg	Synchronized skating
Silver medal – second place	2016 Budapest	Synchronized skating
Silver medal – second place	2023 Lake Placid	Synchronized skating
Bronze medal – third place	2004 Zagreb	Synchronized skating
Bronze medal – third place	2005 Prague	Synchronized skating
Bronze medal – third place	2014 Courmayeur	Synchronized skating
Bronze medal – third place	2019 Helsinki	Synchronized skating
Bronze medal – third place	2022 Hamilton	Synchronized skating
Bronze medal – third place	2024 Zagreb	Synchronized skating
Bronze medal – third place	2026 Salzburg	Synchronized skating

Helsinki Rockettes are a senior-level synchronized skating team from Helsinki, Finland, representing the figure skating club Helsingin Taitoluisteluklubi. They are one of the most successful teams in the world with four World Championships titles (2008, 2010, 2011 and 2025) and are thirteen Finnish championship titles.

Helsinki Rockettes claimed their first World Championships medal, silver, in 2001. They won another silver medal as well as two bronze medals before capturing their first World title in 2008. They won their second World title in 2010, with Team Finland 2 Marigold IceUnity placing second. The pattern was repeated the following year in their hometown Helsinki in April 2011 when Rockettes became World champions for the third time.

== History ==
The team was founded in 1984 under the name The Rockets, thus being the first synchronized skating team in Finland. The name of the team was changed to Rockettes in 1991, and then to Helsinki Rockettes in 2017. The team's long-time coach Kaisa Arrateig (née Nieminen), with a skating background in Team Surprise, began working with Rockettes in 1997. Out of the 24 times that the World Championships have taken place, Helsinki Rockettes have represented Finland a total of 18 times (as 2025).

== Programs ==
Competition programs by season
Season	Short program	Free skate program
2008–09	Jealousy	Galadriel's Story
2009–10	Harem's Secret	Catch Me If You Can
2010–11	Carnival of Brazil	Heaven or Hell?
2011–12	Swinging Show at Speakeasy's	Goddess of the Wind
2012–13	She-Devil	Illusion
2013–14	Aloha Tahiti, Aloha Moho	We Will Rock You
2014–15	La Fiesta	The Story of a Bollywood Star
2015–16	Why?	Journey to the Moon
2016–17	Mirror Mirror	Valkyria
2017–18	Tiger	Two Sides of Her
2018–19	Symphony of Passion	Radio Waves
2019–20	Alarm	Wounded Angel
2020–21	Loneliness	Muse
2021–22	Femme Fatale	Digital Twin
2022–23	Breathe	Requiem
2023–24	Liberation	Incantation
2024–25	La Poème-Laponie	Criminal
2025-26	O Fortuna	¡Vida, Bienvenida!

== Competitive highlights ==
Competition placements since the 2019-20 season
Season	2019-20	2020-21	2021-22	2022-23	2023-24	2024-25	2025-26
World Championships	C	C	3rd	2nd	3rd	1st	3rd
Finnish Championships	1st	1st	1st	2nd	1st	2nd	1st
Britannia Cup							2nd (CS)
Budapest Cup					3rd (CS)		
California Cup	1st (CS)						
US International Classic						4th (CS)	
Leon Lurje Trophy				1st (CS)			
Marie Lundmark Trophy			1st		1st (CS)		2nd (CS)
Mozart Cup						1st (CS)	
Neuchâtel Trophy				1st (CS)			
French Cup	1st (CS)		1st (CS)		1st	1st	1st
Hevelius Cup	2nd						
Riga Amber Cup				1st			2nd
Shanghai Trophy	1st					1st	

=== Competitive results (2009–2019) ===
International
Event	09–10	10–11	11–12	12–13	13–14	14–15	15–16	16–17	17–18	18–19
World Championships	1st	1st	4th		3rd	4th	2nd	5th		3rd
Cup of Berlin	1st	1st		2nd						
Finlandia Cup	2nd									
Finlandia Trophy				2nd	4th	4th	1st	5th	1st	4th
French Cup				3rd	2nd	2nd	2nd	2nd	3rd	3rd
Leon Lurje Trophy							1st	1st		2nd
Lumière Cup										2nd
Mozart Cup			2nd		2nd	2nd				
Neuchâtel Trophy									1st	
SynchroFest International			3rd							
Winter Universiade		1st								
National
Finnish Championships	1st	1st	1st	3rd	2nd	2nd	3rd	2nd	2nd	1st

=== Competitive results (1999–2009) ===
National
Event	1999–00	2000–01	2001–02	2002–03	2003–04	2004–05	2005–06	2006–07	2007–08	2008–09
1st Finnish Championships; Qualifier					3rd	3rd	1st	2nd	1st	2nd
2nd Finnish Championships; Qualifier						2nd	2nd	2nd	1st	3rd
Finnish Championships	2nd	1st	2nd	3rd	2nd	2nd	2nd	3rd	1st	3rd
International
Event	1999–00	2000–01	2001–02	2002–03	2003–04	2004–05	2005–06	2006–07	2007–08	2008–09
World Championships	4th	2nd	DNQ	DNQ	3rd	2nd	3rd	DNQ	1st	DNQ
Source										
Cup of Berlin						1st	1st		1st	
Source										
Finlandia Cup	2nd		2nd		2nd				1st	
Source										
French Cup	5th							2nd		2nd
Source										
Neuchâtel Trophy					3rd					
Source										
Prague Cup						2nd		1st	1st	
Source										
Spring Cup			1st	1st						
Source										
DNQ = did not qualify
