= Kenyan Boys Choir =

Male voice choir from Nairobi, Kenya

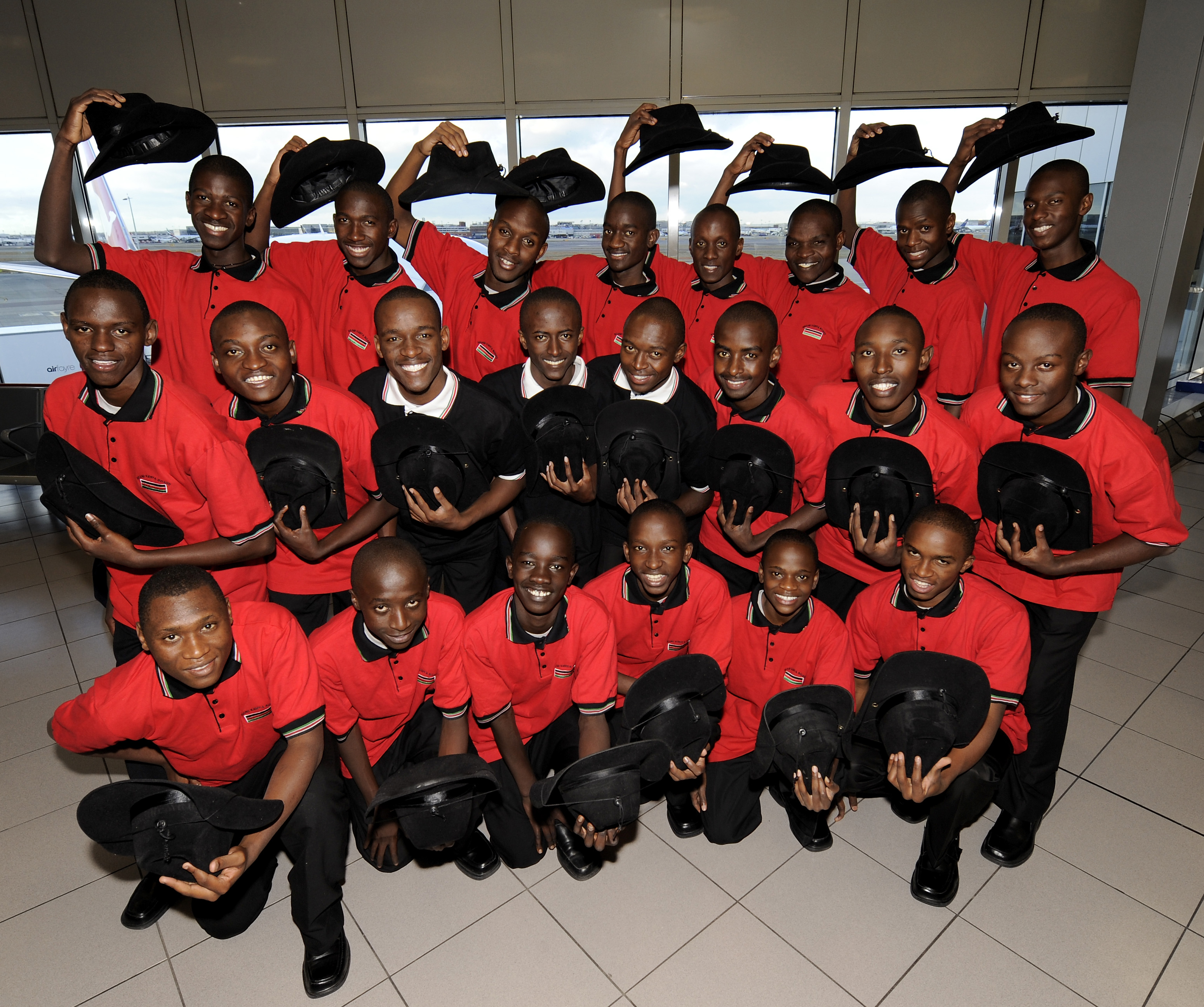
- The Kenyan Boys Choir, Heathrow Airport

Background information
- Origin: Nairobi, Kenya
- Genres: Choral Music
- Occupation: Choir
- Years active: 2004 – present
- Labels: Universal Music Group; Decca Records
- Website: kenyanboyschoir.org

The Kenyan Boys Choir is an African traditional and contemporary male voice choir based in the city of Nairobi, Kenya.

== Background ==
The Kenyan Boys Choir consists of 25 boys, aged between 13 and 24, from various Kenyan backgrounds and tribes, brought together by the urge to sing, nurture their talent and build themselves into disciplined, motivated and socially responsible adults. The choir was directed by the former director Joseph Muyale Inzai until 2010 when The founding Members took up the role of leadership and mentorship to inspire other young boys to become leaders in their own craft and lives. The choir gained widespread recognition and international media coverage in early 2009 after performing at Barack Obama's inauguration ceremony in Washington, D.C. On their way back to Nairobi they were intercepted by Universal Music Group representatives waiting for them at Heathrow Airport in London and were signed in the departure lounge to Decca Records as they waited for their connecting flight. After releasing the album "The Spirit of Africa" Under the label they went on to independently release an Album "Liberty" in 2013 and a Christmas EP "Furahia" in 2014.

== Discography ==
=== Albums ===
- Uvumbuzi (2004)
- Amerika Jambo (2008)
- Spirit of Africa (2009)
- Liberty (2013)
- Furahia (2014)
- Twende (2024)

=== Singles ===
- "Homeless" (2009)
- "Drummer boy" (2010)
- "Kenya" (2013)
- "Feliz Navidad" (2014)
- "Jealous (Nick Jonas) cover" (2015)

=== Feat ===
- "There Were" ft. Lê Cát Trọng Lý (2019)
