= Prague Cup =

Synchronized skating competition

Prague Cup is an international, multi-level synchronized skating competition, held in Prague, Czech Republic. Held since 2001 and being on a hiatus (no competitions in 2006 and 2011–2014), the competition has attracted the world's best-performing teams to compete. Prague Cup is organized by the Czech Figure Skating Association and sanctioned by the International Skating Union.

== Medalists ==
=== Senior teams ===
Year	Gold	Total	SP	FS	Silver	Total	SP	FS	Bronze	Total	SP	FS	Source(s)
2001	(United States) Miami University	1.5			(United States) Starlets	3.0			(Czech Republic) Orion	4.5			
2002	(Czech Republic) Orion	1.5			(Czech Republic) Olympia	3.5			(Sweden) Seaside	4.0			
2003	(Germany) Team Berlin 1	1.5		1.0	(Canada) Stanford and Company	3.0		2.0	(United States) Crystallettes	4.5		3.0	
2004	(Sweden) Team Surprise	1.5		1.0	(Finland) Team Unique	3.0		2.0	(Germany) Team Berlin 1	4.5		3.0	
2005	(Finland) Marigold IceUnity	1.5		1.0	(Finland) Rockettes	3.0		2.0	(United States) Haydenettes	4.5		3.0	
2006	(no competition held)												
2007	(Finland) Rockettes	178.74	58.12	120.62	(Finland) Team Unique	174.38	61.42	112.96	(United States) Crystallettes	163.82	56.60	107.22	
2008	(Finland) Rockettes	206.22	74.44	131.78	(Russia) Paradise	195.22	70.34	124.88	(United States) Crystallettes	181.86	68.04	113.82	
2009	(Finland) Marigold IceUnity	204.08	74.62	129.46	(Finland) Team Unique	203.74	74.44	129.30	(Sweden) Team Surprise	198.80	76.20	122.60	
2010	(United States) Crystallettes	151.16	57.59	93.57	(Czech Republic) Olympia	137.49	51.21	86.28	(Switzerland) Team Dancers	117.58	45.87	71.71	
