= Mozart Cup =

Synchronized skating competition

- Status: Active
- Genre: List of figure skating competitions
- Frequency: annually
- Location: Salzburg, Austria
- Inaugurated: 2011
- Organiser: Skate Austria
- Website: www.mozartcup.biz

The Mozart Cup is a international multi-level synchronized skating competition hosted by Skate Austria, held annually since 2011 in Salzburg, Austria. it has been designated as a challenger series competition for various seasons.

== Medalists ==
=== Senior ===
Year	Gold	Silver	Bronze	Details
2011	(Finland) Marigold IceUnity	(United States) Haydenettes	(Sweden) Team Boomerang	
2012	(Finland) Marigold IceUnity	(Finland) Rockettes	(Canada) NEXXICE	
2013	(Senior event not held)			
2014	(Finland) Marigold IceUnity	(Finland) Rockettes	(Canada) NEXXICE	
2015	(Canada) Les Suprêmes	(Finland) Rockettes	(United States) Miami University	
2016	(Finland) Marigold IceUnity	(United States) Miami University	(Canada) Team Meraki	
2017	(Finland) Marigold IceUnity	(United States) Miami University	(United States) Skyliners	
2018	(Canada) Les Suprêmes	(United States) Skyliners	(Finland) Lumineers	
2019	(Canada) Nova	(Finland) Marigold IceUnity	(Russia) Team Crystal Ice	
2020	(Event not held)			
2021	Cancelled due to the COVID-19 pandemic			
2022	(Germany) Team Berlin 1	(Czech Republic) Olympia	(Germany) United Angles	
2023	(Canada) NEXXICE	(United States) Haydenettes	(Finland) Dream Edges	
2024	(Finland) Marigold IceUnity	(Germany) Skating Graces		
2025	(Finland) Rockettes	(Finland) Lumineers	(Italy) Ice on Fire	
2026	(Germany) Skating Graces			

=== Junior ===
Year	Gold	Silver	Bronze	Details
2011	(Canada) NEXXICE	(Finland) Musketeers	(United States) Lexettes	
2012	(Finland) Ice Steps	(Finland) Stella Polaris	(Canada) Xcellence	
2013	(Finland) Fire Blades	(United Kingdom) Icicles	(Czech Republic) Starlets	
2014	(Canada) Les Pirouettes	(Russia) Crystal Ice	(Finland) Sun City Swing	
2015	(Russia) Crystal Ice	(United States) Lexettes	(Canada) Les Pirouettes	
2016	(Russia) Crystal Ice	(United States) Lexettes	(Finland) Sun City Swing	
2017	(United States) Lexettes	(Canada) NEXXICE	(Finland) Musketeers	
2018	(Russia) Junost	(Russia) Crystal Ice	(Canada) Les Suprêmes	
2019	(Russia) Crystal Ice	(United States) Skyliners	(Finland) Mystique	
2020	(Event not held)			
2021	Cancelled due to the COVID-19 pandemic			
2022	(United States) Skyliners	(United States) Hockettes	(United States) Fon du Lac Blades	
2023	(United States) Skyliners	(Finland) Musketeers	(Finland) Mystique	
2024	(Finland) Musketeers	(Finland) Reflections	(United States) Northernettes	
2025	(Finland) Fintastic	(Finland) Valley Bay	(Sweden) Seaside	
2026	(Canada) Gold Ice	(Canada) Prima	(Finland) Reflections	
