= World Synchronized Skating Championships =

Annual synchronized skating competition

World Figure Synchronized Skating Championships
- Status: Active
- Genre: International championship event
- Frequency: Annual
- Previous event: 2026 World Championships
- Next event: 2027 World Championships
- Organizer: International Skating Union

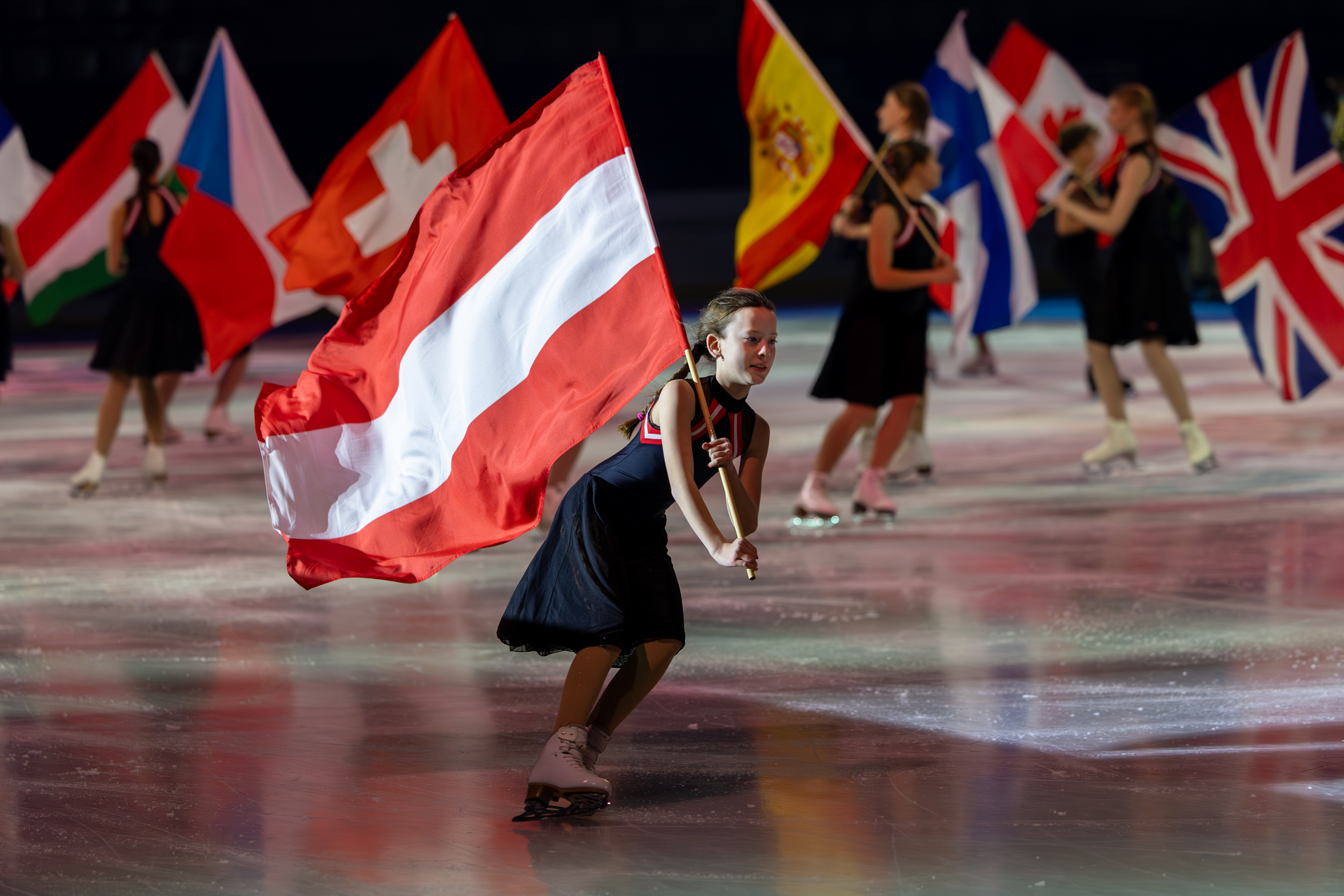
2026 ISU Synchronized Skating World Championships Opening Ceremony

The World Synchronized Skating Championships are an annual synchronized skating competition sanctioned by the International Skating Union (ISU). The first World Championships were held in 2000 in Minneapolis, Minnesota, in the United States; Team Surprise of Sweden were the winners. They have been held every year since, except for 2020 and 2021, when they were cancelled on account of the COVID-19 pandemic. At the 2024 World Championships, Les Suprêmes of Canada made history when they became the first synchronized skating team to win three consecutive World Championships.

Until 2026, the top positions were mainly dominated by Finland and Sweden: the Swedish Team Surprise have won six World titles (latest in 2012), five silver medals and one bronze medal, and the Finnish Marigold IceUnity are five-time World Champions with seven silver medals and two bronze medals. Also from Finland, Helsinki Rockettes have earned four World titles, four silver medals and seven bronze medals.

== Medalists ==
Synchronized event medalists
Year	Location	Gold	Silver	Bronze	Ref.
2000	(United States) Minneapolis	(Sweden) Team Surprise	(Canada) Black Ice	(Finland) Marigold IceUnity	
2001	(Finland) Helsinki	(Sweden) Team Surprise	(Finland) Helsinki Rockettes	(Canada) Black Ice	
2002	(France) Rouen	(Finland) Marigold IceUnity	(Sweden) Team Surprise	(Canada) Black Ice	
2003	(Canada) Ottawa	(Sweden) Team Surprise	(Finland) Marigold IceUnity	(Canada) Les Suprêmes	
2004	(Croatia) Zagreb	(Finland) Marigold IceUnity	(Sweden) Team Surprise	(Finland) Helsinki Rockettes	
2005	(Sweden) Gothenburg	(Sweden) Team Surprise	(Finland) Helsinki Rockettes	(Finland) Marigold IceUnity	
2006	(Czech Republic) Prague	(Finland) Marigold IceUnity	(Sweden) Team Surprise	(Finland) Helsinki Rockettes	
2007	(Canada) London	(Sweden) Team Surprise	(United States) Miami University	(Canada) NEXXICE	
2008	(Hungary) Budapest	(Finland) Helsinki Rockettes	(Sweden) Team Surprise	(Canada) NEXXICE	
2009	(Croatia) Zagreb	(Canada) NEXXICE	(Finland) Team Unique	(Sweden) Team Surprise	
2010	(United States) Colorado Springs	(Finland) Helsinki Rockettes	(Finland) Marigold IceUnity	(United States) Haydenettes	
2011	(Finland) Helsinki	(Finland) Helsinki Rockettes	(Finland) Marigold IceUnity	(United States) Haydenettes	
2012	(Sweden) Gothenburg	(Sweden) Team Surprise	(Canada) NEXXICE	(United States) Haydenettes	
2013	(United States) Boston	(Finland) Team Unique	(Canada) NEXXICE	(United States) Haydenettes	
2014	(Italy) Courmayeur	(Finland) Marigold IceUnity	(Canada) NEXXICE	(Finland) Helsinki Rockettes	
2015	(Canada) Hamilton	(Canada) NEXXICE	(Finland) Marigold IceUnity	(Russia) Paradise	
2016	(Hungary) Budapest	(Russia) Paradise	(Finland) Helsinki Rockettes	(United States) Haydenettes	
2017	(United States) Colorado Springs	(Russia) Paradise	(Finland) Marigold IceUnity	(Canada) NEXXICE	
2018	(Sweden) Stockholm	(Finland) Marigold IceUnity	(Sweden) Team Surprise	(Russia) Paradise	
2019	(Finland) Helsinki	(Russia) Paradise	(Finland) Marigold IceUnity	(Finland) Helsinki Rockettes	
2020	(United States) Lake Placid	Competitions cancelled due to the COVID-19 pandemic			
2021	(Croatia) Zagreb	Competitions cancelled due to the COVID-19 pandemic			
2022	(Canada) Hamilton	(Canada) Les Suprêmes	(Finland) Marigold IceUnity	(Finland) Helsinki Rockettes	
2023	(United States) Lake Placid	(Canada) Les Suprêmes	(Finland) Helsinki Rockettes	(Finland) Team Unique	
2024	(Croatia) Zagreb	(Canada) Les Suprêmes	(United States) Haydenettes	(Finland) Helsinki Rockettes	
2025	(Finland) Helsinki	(Finland) Helsinki Rockettes	(Finland) Team Unique	(United States) Haydenettes	
2026	(Austria) Salzburg	(Canada) Les Suprêmes	(United States) Haydenettes	(Finland) Helsinki Rockettes	
2027	(United Kingdom) Nottingham	To be held on April 2–3, 2027			

== Summary ==
Medals by country
Rank	Nation	Gold	Silver	Bronze	Total
1	Finland	10	13	10	33
2	Sweden	6	5	1	12
3	Canada	6	4	6	16
4	Russia	3	0	2	5
5	United States	0	3	6	9
Totals (5 entries)		25	25	25	75

Medals by team
Rank	Team	Gold	Silver	Bronze	Total
1	(Sweden) Team Surprise	6	5	1	12
2	(Finland) Marigold IceUnity	5	7	2	14
3	(Finland) Helsinki Rockettes	4	4	7	15
4	(Canada) Les Suprêmes	4	0	1	5
5	(Russia) Paradise	3	0	2	5
6	(Canada) NEXXICE	2	3	3	8
7	(Finland) Team Unique	1	2	1	4
8	(United States) Haydenettes	0	2	6	8
9	(Canada) Black Ice	0	1	2	3
10	(United States) Miami University	0	1	0	1
Totals (10 entries)		25	25	25	75

== See also ==
- Synchronized skating
- ISU World Junior Synchronized Skating Championships
