= Spartak-Junost =

Russian synchronized skating team

Spartak Junost

Team information
- Country represented: Russia
- Level: Junior
- World standing: 5

ISU team best scores
- Combined total: 200.74; 2019 Junior Worlds
- Short program: 76.46; 2019 Junior Worlds
- Free skate: 124.28; 2019 Junior Worlds
Medal record
Representing Russia
Synchronized skating
World Junior Championships
Gold medal – first place	2019 Neuchatel	Synchronized skating
Gold medal – first place	2018 Zagreb	Synchronized skating
Gold medal – first place	2017 Mississauga	Synchronized skating
Bronze medal – third place	2013 Helsinki	Synchronized skating

Spartak Junost (Russian: Спартак Юность) are a junior-level synchronized skating team from Yekaterinburg, Russia. They are 2017 and 2018 World Junior Synchronized Skating Championships gold medalist. They have also won bronze medal at the 2013 World Junior Synchronized Skating Championships, held in Helsinki, Finland.

== Competitive results ==
=== Seasons 2012–18 ===
International
Event	2012–13	2013–14	2014–15	2015–16	2016–17	2017–18
World Junior Championships	3rd	Not held	4th	Not held	1st	1st
Source						
Junior World Challenge Cup	Not held	6th	Not held	3rd	Not held	Not held
Source						
French Cup			2nd		1st	1st
Source						
