= 2020–21 synchronized skating season =

Competitive synchronized skating year from 2020/7/1 to 2021/6/30

- Date: July 1, 2020 – June 30, 2021
- Previous: 2019–20
- Next: 2021–22

The 2020–21 synchronized skating season began on July 1, 2020, and ended on June 30, 2021. Running concurrent with the 2020–21 figure skating season. During this season, elite synchronized skating teams were set to compete in the ISU Championship level at the 2021 World Championships, and through the Challenger Series. They also were set to compete at various other elite level international and national competitions; Though ultimately no international competitions were actually held due to the COVID-19 pandemic.

== Impact of the COVID-19 pandemic ==
Though international competitions were planned for the season, all were cancelled in a series of communications throughout the competitive season.

Due to travel restrictions and competition organizing difficulties related to the COVID-19 pandemic no world standing/ranking points were to be awarded.

== Competitions ==
The 2020–21 season had the following competitions scheduled.

Key

ISU Championships	Challenger Series	Other international	Nationals

Date	Event	Type	Level	Location	Details
2020
December 4-6	Riga Amber Cup	Other int	Sen.-Nov.	Riga, Latvia	(Event Cancelled)
December 10-13	Lumière Cup	Other int	Sen.-Nov.	Eindhoven, Netherlands	(Event Cancelled)
December 17-19	Hevelius Cup	~~Challenger~~ Nats	Jun.-Nov.	Gdansk, Poland	Details
December 19-20	Santa Claus Cup	Other int	Sen.-Nov.	Brno, Czech Republic	(Event Cancelled)
2021
January 14-17	Marie Lundmark Trophy	Challenger	Sen.-Jun.	Turku, Finland	(Event Cancelled)
January 14-17	Marie Lundmark Trophy	Other int	Novice	Turku, Finland	(Event Cancelled)
January 16-17	Britannia Cup	Other int	Sen.-Nov.	Nottingham, England	(Event Cancelled)
January 21-23	Mozart Cup	Challenger	Sen.-Jun.	Salzburg, Austria	(Event Cancelled)
January 28-31	Leon Lurje Trophy	Other int	Sen.-Nov.	Gothenburg, Sweden	(Event Cancelled)
February 5-6	Trophy D'Ecosse	Other int	Sen.-Nov.	Dumfries, England	(Event Cancelled)
February 5-7	French Cup	Other int	Sen.-Nov.	Rouen, France	(Event Cancelled)
February 12-13	Neuchâtel Trophy	Other int	Sen.-Nov.	Neuchâtel, Switzerland	(Event Cancelled)
February 19-21	Spring Cup	Other int	Sen.-Nov.	Sesto San Giovanni, Italy	(Event Cancelled)
February 26-28	Budapest Cup	Other int	Sen.-Nov.	Budapest, Hungary	(Event Cancelled)
March 6-7	Steel City Trophy	Other int	Sen.-Nov.	Sheffield, England	(Event Cancelled)
March 12-14	ISU World Junior Synchronized Skating Championships	ISU Championships	Junior	Lyon, France	(Event Cancelled)
April 8-10	ISU World Synchronized Skating Championships	ISU Championships	Senior	Hamilton, Canada	(Event Cancelled)
Type: ISU Champ. = ISU Championships; Other int. = International events except ISU Championships; Nats. = National championships Levels: Sen. = Senior; Jun. = Junior; Nov. = Novice

=== International medalists ===
Championships
Competition	Gold	Silver	Bronze	Results
Worlds	Cancelled due to the COVID-19 pandemic			
Junior Worlds	Cancelled due to the COVID-19 pandemic			
Challenger Series
Marie Lundmark Trophy	Cancelled due to the COVID-19 pandemic			
Mozart Cup	Cancelled due to the COVID-19 pandemic			
Other International
Competition	Gold	Silver	Bronze	Source
Riga Amber Cup	Cancelled due to the COVID-19 pandemic			
Lumière Cup	Cancelled due to the COVID-19 pandemic			
Santa Claus Cup	Cancelled due to the COVID-19 pandemic			
Marie Lundmark Trophy novice only	Cancelled due to the COVID-19 pandemic			
Britannia Cup	Cancelled due to the COVID-19 pandemic			
Leon Lurje Trophy	Cancelled due to the COVID-19 pandemic			
Trophy D'Ecosse	Cancelled due to the COVID-19 pandemic			
French Cup	Cancelled due to the COVID-19 pandemic			
Neuchâtel Trophy	Cancelled due to the COVID-19 pandemic			
Spring Cup	Cancelled due to the COVID-19 pandemic			
Budapest Cup	Cancelled due to the COVID-19 pandemic			
Steel City Trophy	Cancelled due to the COVID-19 pandemic			
