= French Cup (synchronized skating) =

Synchronized skating competition

- Status: active
- Genre: List of figure skating competitions
- Frequency: annually
- Location: Rouen, France
- Inaugurated: 1994
- Website: frenchcup.fr

The French Cup is an international, multi-level synchronized skating competition, held annually in Rouen, France. Held for the first time in 1994, the competition is organized by Fédération française des sports de glace and sanctioned by the International Skating Union.

== Medalists ==
=== Senior teams ===
Year	Gold	Total	SP	FS	Silver	Total	SP	FS	Bronze	Total	SP	FS	Source(s)
1997	(United States) Haydenettes				(Canada) Les Étincelles				(Canada) Edmonton Ice Elite				
1998	(Canada) black ice				(Canada) Burlington Ice Image				(Canada) Les Étincelles				
1999	(Sweden) Team Surprise				(United States) Haydenettes				(Germany) Team Berlin 1				
2000	(United States) Haydenettes				(Finland) Team Unique				(Canada) Les Pirouettes				
2001	(Russia) Paradise				(United States) Team Elan				(Finland) Energetics				
2002	(Finland) Team Unique				(Russia) Paradise				(Canada) NEXXICE				
2003	(United States) Haydenettes				(Finland) Team Unique				(Russia) Paradise				
2004	(Russia) Paradise				(United States) Team Elan				(Finland) Steps on Ice				
2005	(Finland) Marigold IceUnity	1.5	0.5	1.0	(Finland) Team Unique	3.0	1.0	2.0	(Russia) Paradise	4.5	1.5	3.0	
2006	(Sweden) Team Surprise	162.42	61.68	100.74	(Finland) Marigold IceUnity	150.29	43.19	107.10	(Finland) Team Unique	144.71	47.96	96.75	
2007	(Finland) Team Unique	198.76	68.74	130.02	(Finland) Rockettes	192.38	65.76	126.62	(Canada) Les Suprêmes	184.20	62.18	122.02	
2008	(Finland) Marigold IceUnity	212.58	75.34	137.24	(Finland) Team Unique	209.15	73.76	135.39	(United States) Miami University	184.88	70.90	113.98	
2009	(Finland) Team Unique	212.89	76.32	136.57	(Finland) Rockettes	205.05	72.13	132.92	(United States) Haydenettes	199.35	72.61	126.74	
2010	(Finland) Marigold IceUnity	211.92	77.14	134.78	(Finland) Team Unique	205.68	78.66	127.02	(Canada) NEXXICE	202.76	74.58	128.18	
2011	(Finland) Team Unique	212.34	72.74	139.60	(Canada) Les Suprêmes	186.47	62.79	123.68	(United States) Crystallettes	170.25	61.01	109.24	
2012	(Finland) Team Unique	183.92	62.16	121.76	(Finland) Marigold IceUnity	179.24	63.38	115.86	(Russia) Paradise	169.02	61.32	107.70	
2013	(Finland) Team Unique	214.58	74.76	139.82	(Russia) Paradise	206.26	72.10	134.16	(Finland) Rockettes	199.92	69.66	130.26	
2014	(Finland) Team Unique	215.30	75.46	139.84	(Finland) Rockettes	208.05	72.17	135.88	(Finland) Marigold IceUnity	206.07	72.87	133.20	
2015	(Finland) Marigold IceUnity	208.24	68.68	139.56	(Finland) Rockettes	202.20	66.62	135.58	(Finland) Team Unique	196.34	65.50	130.84	
2016	(Russia) Paradise	206.08	71.98	134.10	(Finland) Rockettes	200.68	71.42	129.26	(Finland) Team Unique	198.90	69.16	129.74	
2017	(Russia) Paradise	199.16	72.68	129.28	(Finland) Rockettes	196.98	67.70	129.28	(Finland) Team Unique	193.76	69.04	124.72	
2018	(Russia) Paradise	211.18	76.42	134.76	(Finland) Team Unique	203.44	73.44	130.00	(Finland) Rockettes	201.50	75.42	126.08	
2023	(United States) Teams Elite	201.18	66.54	134.64	(Canada) Nova	199.27	64.95	134.32	(France) Les Zoulous	170.81	55.47	115.34	
2024	(Finland) Rockettes	224.37	77.47	146.90	(Finland) Team Unique	221.02	66.55	154.47	(Australia) Ice Storm Lightning	125.73	37.47	88.26	
2025	(Finland) Marigold Ice Unity	217.80	75.48	142.32	(Canada) NEXXICE	208.87	73.16	135.71	(Finland) Team Unique	204.54	65.68	138.66	
2025	(Finland) Helsinki Rockettes	222.96	82.53	140.43	(United States) Haydenettes	213.55	77.31	136.24	(Germany) Team Berlin 1	184.38	62.75	121.63	

=== Junior teams ===
Year	Gold	Total	SP	FS	Silver	Total	SP	FS	Bronze	Total	SP	FS	Source(s)
1994													
1995													
1996	Les Pirouettes								Les Marquises				
1997	(Canada) Stamford & Company	1.5			(Canada) Oakville Ice Impression	3.0			(United Kingdom) Ice Jems	4.5			
1998	(Canada) Ice Expression	1.5			(Finland) Filiae Aboenses	3.0			(United States) Starlets	5.0			
1999	(Finland) Team Mystique	1.5			(United Kingdom) Ice Jems	3.0			(Finland) Team Fintastic	4.5			
2000	(Canada) Kanata Techniques	1.5			(Finland) Filiae Aboenses	2.5			(Finland) Team Fintastic	3.5			
2001	(no junior competition held)												
2002	(Canada) Les Suprêmes	1.5			(Finland) Steps on Ice	3.0			(Canada) Unionville Elite	4.5			
2003	(United States) Chicago Jazz	2.5	1.5	1.0	(Finland) Reflections	3.5	0.5	3.0	(Sweden) Team Convivium	4.0	2.0	2.0	
2004	(Finland) Reflections	1.5	0.5	1.0	(Canada) Ice Fyre	3.0	1.0	2.0	(Canada) Vibe Junior	4.5	1.5	3.0	
2005	(Finland) Team Mystique	1.5	0.5	1.0	(Finland) Ice Steps	3.0	1.0	2.0	(Canada) Gold Ice	4.5	1.5	3.0	
2006	(Canada) black ice	100.02	38.06	61.96	(Finland) Musketeers	97.56	31.54	66.02	(United States) Hockettes	91.66	26.10	65.56	
2007	(Finland) Team Fintastic	158.14	60.60	97.54	(Finland) Les Miracles	156.58	62.00	94.58	(Canada) Les Suprêmes	152.42	55.80	96.62	
2008	(Finland) Team Mystique	159.99	61.56	98.43	(Finland) Ice Fusion	154.23	60.93	93.30	(Finland) Stella Polaris	148.90	55.27	93.63	
2009	(Finland) Team Mystique	167.84	63.48	104.36	(Finland) Team Fintastic	164.73	61.99	102.74	(United States) Chicago Jazz	162.25	59.37	102.88	
2010	(Finland) Musketeers	179.66	68.32	111.34	(Canada) NEXXICE	166.44	62.84	103.60	(Finland) Ice Steps	159.20	62.34	96.86	
2011	(United States) Team Braemar	172.74	59.36	113.38	(Finland) Musketeers	162.57	54.89	107.68	(Finland) Ice Steps	160.37	55.75	104.62	
2012	(Finland) Musketeers	157.60	52.02	105.58	(Finland) Team Fintastic	148.54	51.38	97.16	(Finland) Team Mystique	145.32	47.54	97.78	
2013	(Finland) Musketeers	163.36	57.38	105.98	(Finland) Team Mystique	152.04	51.02	101.02	(Sweden) Team Convivium	143.06	48.94	94.12	
2014	(Finland) Team Fintastic	171.68	55.81	115.87	(Finland) Team Mystique	167.95	57.92	110.03	(Canada) Les Suprêmes	164.60	55.41	109.19	
2015	(Canada) Les Suprêmes	176.00	60.66	115.34	(Russia) Spartak-Junost	169.66	58.82	110.84	(Finland) Team Fintastic	167.78	60.12	107.66	
2016	(Canada) Les Suprêmes	162.88	58.00	104.88	(Finland) Musketeers	155.14	53.70	101.44	(United States) Skyliners	153.14	53.00	100.14	
2017	(Russia) Spartak-Junost	158.80	58.18	106.62	(Finland) Team Fintastic	150.74	55.40	95.34	(United States) Skyliners	146.44	48.64	97.80	
2018	(Russia) Spartak-Junost	176.18	66.66	109.52	(United States) Skyliners	164.58	63.38	101.20	(United States) Lexettes	159.24	60.94	98.30	
2025	(Poland) Ice Fire	153.18	52.67	100.51	(Switzerland) Starlight	135.35	47.83	87.52	(Italy) Hot Shivers	129.63	45.58	84.05	
