= Zagreb Snowflakes Trophy =

Synchronized skating competition

Zagreb Snowflakes Trophy is an international, multi-level synchronized skating competition, held annually since 2001 in Zagreb, Croatia. the competition is organized by Croatian Skating Federation and sanctioned by the International Skating Union.

== Medalists ==
=== Senior teams ===
No. of teams	Year	Gold	Total	SP	FS	Silver	Total	SP	FS	Bronze	Total	SP	FS	Source(s)
	2001	(no competition held for senior teams)												
	2002	(Germany) Shooting Stars	1.5			(Croatia) Zagreb Snowflakes	3.0			(Hungary) Team Synchr-On-Ice	4.5			
	2003	(Canada) black ice	1.5			(Finland) Steps on Ice	3.0			(Czech Republic) Orion	4.5			
	2004	(no competition held)												
	2005	(Finland) Steps on Ice	2.0			(Germany) Skating Mystery	2.5			(Czech Republic) Olympia	5.0			
	2006	(Russia) Paradise	172.10	59.90	112.20	(United States) Western Michigan University	131.00	46.88	84.12	(Switzerland) Starlight Team	130.67	43.83	86.84	
	2007	(Russia) Paradise	200.79	72.88	127.91	(Germany) Team Berlin 1	176.36	62.95	113.41	(United States) Western Michigan University	148.81	56.06	92.75	
	2008	(Russia) Paradise	180.94	69.47	111.47	(Germany) Team Berlin 1	174.30	63.85	110.45	(Germany) Magic Diamonds	137.24	50.62	86.62	
	2009	(no competition held)												
	2010	(Germany) Team Berlin 1	190.28			(Russia) Tatarstan	155.21			(Czech Republic) Olympia	133.46			
	2011	(Russia) Paradise	186.60	63.30	123.30	(Czech Republic) Olympia	144.59	51.15	93.44	(Germany) Skating Graces	129.70	44.89	84.81	
	2012	(Russia) Paradise	174.46	62.13	112.33	(Germany) Team Berlin 1	142.39	47.15	95.24	(Germany) Skating Graces	117.62	31.95	85.67	
	2013	(Russia) Paradise	210.47	74.52	135.95	(Russia) Tatarstan	177.78	60.89	116.89	(Germany) Team Berlin 1	162.46	56.49	105.97	
	2014	(Russia) Paradise	220.54	74.70	145.84	(Russia) Tatarstan	190.18	66.46	123.72	(Croatia) Zagreb Snowflakes	103.29	33.36	69.93	
