= ISU World Standings =

Merit-based figure skating ranking

Figure skating records and statistics

Medal records
- Olympic Games; World Championships; European Championships; Four Continents Championships; Grand Prix of Figure Skating
- Other events: Grand Slam; Junior Grand Slam; Golden Slam; Junior Golden Slam; Super Slam

Highest scores statistics
- Current senior; Current junior; Historical senior; Historical junior

Rankings (current and statistics)
- World Standings; Season's World Ranking

The ISU World Standings (WS) are the objective merit-based method used by the International Skating Union (ISU) for single & pair skating and ice dance, as well as synchronized skating.

Prior to 2010, the ISU used the former world standings system for single & pair skating and ice dance; there was no world standings system for synchronized skating. Starting with the 2010–11 season, the ISU implemented two separate rankings, namely the "ISU World Standings" and the "ISU Season's World Ranking".

The world standing of a skater/team is calculated using the results of the current and preceding two seasons. Its main purpose is to present an objective and accountable system that ensures skaters who were unable to compete for a certain period of time remain in the World Standings and are considered according to their true basic competitiveness. It combines both senior and junior skaters. Starting with the 2023–24 season, an independent ISU World Standings for juniors was established alongside the existing combined standing.

The World Standings are used as basis for the draws or order at ISU events and part of the criteria for the selection of competitors for the ISU Grand Prix and other designated ISU events. The Junior World Standings are used as basis for the draw at the ISU World Junior Championships.

The World Standings do not necessarily reflect the capabilities of some skaters/teams. Due to limits on entries to events (no more than three from each country), and varying numbers of high-level skaters/teams in each country, skaters/teams from some countries may find it more difficult to qualify to compete at major events. Thus, a skater/team with a lower season's best but from a country with few high-level skaters/teams may qualify to a major event while a skater/team with a much higher season's best but from a country with more than three high-level skaters/teams may not be sent. As a result, it is possible for a skater/team who regularly scores higher to end up with a much lower world standing.

== Single & pair skating and ice dance ==
The World Standings are used as basis for the draws of the first segment or to establish the starting order at ISU events and part of the criteria for the selection of competitors for the ISU Grand Prix of Figure Skating and other ISU events designated by the ISU Council.

=== Principles and point distribution ===
The principles and point distribution of the World Standings are in accordance to "ISU Communications 1629, 2550, and 2812" published by the ISU in 2010, 2023, and 2026 respectively.

Since the introduction of the current system back in 2010, the method used to calculate standings has been amended several times. The latest amendment modified the distribution of points for each event, starting with the 2026–27 season. This new points system rewards higher-tiered international competitions over the lower-tiered, while also replacing the algorithmic '10% steps' point distribution with manually tailored point spreads.

The World Standings are calculated from the results of the current season and the preceding two seasons. The number of points scored by each skater/team depends on the final placement and the total amount of points designated for that particular event. Current and intermediate season's earned points will count for 100% of their value, and previous season's earned points will count for 70% of their value. After the current season's World Championships, the results from the earliest season are deleted.

If pairs and ice dance teams officially split up, their partnership will be removed from the standings. Any new partnership starts with zero points; there is no transfer of WS points if pairs or ice dance skaters form a new partnership. When a skater/team officially announces their retirement from competition, they will be removed from the standings.

The following events earn points, with limits on how many results count towards a skater/team's WS:

- ISU Championships (Worlds, Europeans, Four Continents, and Junior Worlds) and Olympic Winter Games: The best two results by points over three seasons (maximum one result per season).
- ISU Grand Prix (including Semi-Finals (from 2027/28) and Final) and ISU Junior Grand Prix (including Final): The best four results by points over three seasons (maximum two results per season).
- International Competitions Senior (including ISU Challenger Series) and Junior: The best four results by points over three seasons (maximum two results per season).

The World Standings order will be updated after each event mentioned in the following point distribution table. Only eligible skaters/teams are considered in the standings.

Distribution of Points

Place	WC/OWG	GPF	EC/FC	WJC	GPSF	GP	JGPF	JGP	CS	IC	JIC
1	1300	1000	850	600	750	500	450	300	350	200	100
2	1150	880	760	540	670	450	400	270	310	150	80
3	1020	780	680	490	590	400	360	245	275	100	60
4	900	700	610	450	510	360	320	220	240		40
5	810	640	550	410	430	320	280	200	210		20
6	740	600	500	370	350	280	250	180	185		
7	680		460	340		240		160	165		
8	630		420	310		200		140	150		
9	580		380	280				120			
10	530		340	250				100			
11	480		300	220							
12	430		260	190							
13	380		230	160							
14	330		200	140							
15	290		180	120							
16	250		160	110							
17	210		140	100							
18	180		120	90							
19	150		110	80							
20	130		100	70							
21	120		90	65							
22	110		80	60							
23	105		75	55							
24	100		70	50							
Event	11605	4600	7665	5550	3300	2750	2060	1935	1885	450	300

- WC = World Championships
- OWG = Olympic Winter Games
- GPF = Grand Prix Final
- EC = European Championships
- FC = Four Continents Championships
- WJC = World Junior Championships
- GPSF = Grand Prix Semi-Finals (from 2027/28)
- GP = Grand Prix
- JGPF = Junior Grand Prix Final
- JGP = Junior Grand Prix
- CS = Challenger Series
- IC = Senior International Competition
- JIC = Junior International Competition

=== Current standings ===
World Standings calculated from the current 2026–27 season (100% point value), as well as the 2025–26 season (100% point value) and 2024–25 season (70% point value).

==== Men's singles ====
Top 10 as of November 15, 2026
Rank	Nation	Skater	Points
1	USA	Ilia Malinin	4810
2	KAZ	Mikhail Shaidorov	4261
3	JPN	Yuma Kagiyama	4123
4	JPN	Shun Sato	4029
5	FRA	Adam Siao Him Fa	3933
6	ITA	Daniel Grassl	3769
7	FRA	Kévin Aymoz	3656
8	GEO	Nika Egadze	3352
9	JPN	Kao Miura	3328
10	EST	Aleksandr Selevko	3301

==== Women's singles ====
Top 10 as of November 15, 2026
Rank	Nation	Skater	Points
1	JPN	Mone Chiba	4412
2	USA	Alysa Liu	4248
3	JPN	Ami Nakai	3858
4	USA	Amber Glenn	3671
5	USA	Isabeau Levito	3645
6	GEO	Anastasiia Gubanova	3409
7	ITA	Lara Naki Gutmann	3356
8	EST	Niina Petrõkina	3135
9	USA	Bradie Tennell	2934
10	KAZ	Sofia Samodelkina	2725

==== Pairs ====
Top 10 as of November 15, 2026
Rank	Nation	Team	Points
1	GER	Minerva Fabienne Hase; Nikita Volodin	4844
2	GEO	Anastasiia Metelkina; Luka Berulava	4810
3	USA	Alisa Efimova; Misha Mitrofanov	3713
4	CAN	Lia Pereira; Trennt Michaud	3218
5	CAN	Deanna Stellato-Dudek; Maxime Deschamps	2890
6	USA	Ellie Kam; Danny O'Shea	2810
7	HUN	Maria Pavlova; Alexei Sviatchenko	2793
8	SUI	Oxana Vouillamoz; Tom Bouvart	2636
9	JPN	Yuna Nagaoka; Sumitada Moriguchi	2579
10	CAN	Ava Kemp; Yohnatan Elizarov	2523

==== Ice dance ====
Top 10 as November 15, 2026
Rank	Nation	Team	Points
1	GBR	Lilah Fear; Lewis Gibson	4627
2	USA	Madison Chock; Evan Bates	3960
3	FRA	Evgeniia Lopareva; Geoffrey Brissaud	3831
4	ESP	Olivia Smart; Tim Dieck	3754
5	GEO	Diana Davis; Gleb Smolkin	3520
6	USA	Emilea Zingas; Vadym Kolesnik	3502
7	CAN	Piper Gilles; Paul Poirer	3467
8	ITA	Charlène Guignard; Marco Fabbri	3434
9	USA	Christina Carreira; Anthony Ponomarenko	3350
10	USA	Caroline Green; Michael Parsons	3182

=== Season-end No. 1 skaters ===
Chronological list, by discipline, of the No. 1 in the World Standings at the end of each respective season.

==== Men's singles ====
Updated through 2025–26

Season's-end No. 1 (men's)
Season	Nation	Skater	Points	Date^{*}	Age	Ref
2001–02	RUS	Evgeni Plushenko	4175	March 21, 2002	19 years, 138 days	
2002–03	RUS	Evgeni Plushenko	4110	March 27, 2003	20 years, 144 days	
2003–04	RUS	Evgeni Plushenko	4875	March 25, 2004	21 years, 143 days	
2004–05	RUS	Evgeni Plushenko	4550	March 17, 2005	22 years, 134 days	
2005–06	CAN	Jeffrey Buttle	4550	March 23, 2006	23 years, 203 days	
2006–07	JPN	Daisuke Takahashi	4505	March 22, 2007	21 years, 6 days	
2007–08	JPN	Daisuke Takahashi	4249	March 22, 2008	22 years, 6 days	
2008–09	CZE	Tomáš Verner	4092	March 26, 2009	22 years, 296 days	
2009–10	USA	Evan Lysacek	4378	March 25, 2010	24 years, 294 days	
2010–11	JPN	Daisuke Takahashi	4158	April 28, 2011	25 years, 43 days	
2011–12	CAN	Patrick Chan	4800	March 31, 2012	21 years, 91 days	
2012–13	CAN	Patrick Chan	4808	March 15, 2013	22 years, 74 days	
2013–14	JPN	Yuzuru Hanyu	5078	March 28, 2014	19 years, 111 days	
2014–15	JPN	Yuzuru Hanyu	5169	March 28, 2015	20 years, 111 days	
2015–16	JPN	Yuzuru Hanyu	5145	April 1, 2016	21 years, 116 days	
2016–17	JPN	Yuzuru Hanyu	5390	April 1, 2017	22 years, 115 days	
2017–18	JPN	Yuzuru Hanyu	5265	March 24, 2018	23 years, 107 days	
2018–19	USA	Nathan Chen	5414	March 23, 2019	19 years, 322 days	
2019–20	USA	Nathan Chen	4810	April 16, 2020^{#}	20 years, 347 days	
2020–21	USA	Nathan Chen	4080	March 27, 2021	21 years, 326 days	
2021–22	USA	Nathan Chen	3964	March 26, 2022	22 years, 325 days	
2022–23	JPN	Shoma Uno	4360	March 25, 2023	25 years, 98 days	
2023–24	USA	Ilia Malinin	5365	March 23, 2024	19 years, 112 days	
2024–25	USA	Ilia Malinin	5664	March 29, 2025	20 years, 117 days	
2025–26	USA	Ilia Malinin	5770	March 28, 2026	21 years, 116 days	

^{*}Date the free skating of the World Championships was held.

^{#}Date the 2020 World Championships were officially cancelled.

==== Women's singles ====
Updated through 2025–26

Season's-end No. 1 (women's)
Season	Nation	Skater	Points	Date^{*}	Age	Ref
2001–02	RUS	Irina Slutskaya	3989	March 23, 2002	23 years, 42 days	
2002–03	USA	Michelle Kwan	3780	March 29, 2003	22 years, 265 days	
2003–04	USA	Sasha Cohen	4655	March 27, 2004	19 years, 153 days	
2004–05	JPN	Shizuka Arakawa	4305	March 19, 2005	23 years, 80 days	
2005–06	RUS	Irina Slutskaya	4650	March 25, 2006	27 years, 44 days	
2006–07	JPN	Mao Asada	4205	March 24, 2007	16 years, 180 days	
2007–08	JPN	Mao Asada	4680	March 20, 2008	17 years, 177 days	
2008–09	KOR	Yuna Kim	4652	March 28, 2009	18 years, 204 days	
2009–10	KOR	Yuna Kim	4880	March 27, 2010	19 years, 203 days	
2010–11	ITA	Carolina Kostner	4341	April 30, 2011	24 years, 81 days	
2011–12	ITA	Carolina Kostner	5167	March 31, 2012	25 years, 52 days	
2012–13	ITA	Carolina Kostner	5189	March 16, 2013	26 years, 36 days	
2013–14	JPN	Mao Asada	4572	March 29, 2014	23 years, 185 days	
2014–15	RUS	Elizaveta Tuktamysheva	4542	March 28, 2015	18 years, 101 days	
2015–16	JPN	Satoko Miyahara	4638	April 2, 2016	18 years, 7 days	
2016–17	RUS	Evgenia Medvedeva	5100	March 31, 2017	17 years, 132 days	
2017–18	CAN	Kaetlyn Osmond	5081	March 23, 2018	22 years, 108 days	
2018–19	RUS	Alina Zagitova	5320	March 22, 2019	16 years, 308 days	
2019–20	JPN	Rika Kihira	4958	April 16, 2020^{#}	17 years, 270 days	
2020–21	JPN	Rika Kihira	4196	March 26, 2021	18 years, 248 days	
2021–22	RUS	Anna Shcherbakova	4419	March 25, 2022	17 years, 362 days	
2022–23	JPN	Kaori Sakamoto	4762	March 24, 2023	22 years, 349 days	
2023–24	JPN	Kaori Sakamoto	5595	March 22, 2024	23 years, 348 days	
2024–25	JPN	Kaori Sakamoto	5510	March 28, 2025	24 years, 353 days	
2025–26	JPN	Kaori Sakamoto	5434	March 27, 2026	25 years, 352 days	

^{*}Date the free skating of the World Championships was held.

^{#}Date the 2020 World Championships were officially cancelled.

==== Pairs ====
Updated through 2025–26

Season's-end No. 1 (pairs)
Season	Nation	Skater	Points	Date^{*}	Age	Ref
2001–02	RUS	Elena Berezhnaya; Anton Sikharulidze	3729	March 20, 2002	24 years, 160 days 25 years, 146 days	
2002–03	CHN	Shen Xue; Zhao Hongbo	3638	March 26, 2003	24 years, 133 days 29 years, 185 days	
2003–04	CHN	Shen Xue; Zhao Hongbo	4790	March 24, 2004	25 years, 132 days 30 years, 184 days	
2004–05	RUS	Maria Petrova; Alexei Tikhonov	4540	March 16, 2005	27 years, 107 days 33 years, 135 days	
2005–06	RUS	Maria Petrova; Alexei Tikhonov	4540	March 22, 2006	28 years, 113 days 34 years, 141 days	
2006–07	CHN	Zhang Dan; Zhang Hao	4675	March 21, 2007	21 years, 168 days 22 years, 258 days	
2007–08	GER	Aljona Savchenko; Robin Szolkowy	4971	March 19, 2008	24 years, 60 days 28 years, 249 days	
2008–09	GER	Aljona Savchenko; Robin Szolkowy	5252	March 25, 2009	25 years, 65 days 29 years, 254 days	
2009–10	GER	Aljona Savchenko; Robin Szolkowy	5211	March 24, 2010	26 years, 64 days 30 years, 253 days	
2010–11	GER	Aljona Savchenko; Robin Szolkowy	5007	April 28, 2011	27 years, 99 days 31 years, 288 days	
2011–12	GER	Aljona Savchenko; Robin Szolkowy	5029	March 28, 2012	28 years, 69 days 32 years, 258 days	
2012–13	RUS	Tatiana Volosozhar; Maxim Trankov	5525	March 15, 2013	26 years, 297 days 29 years, 159 days	
2013–14	RUS	Tatiana Volosozhar; Maxim Trankov	5674	March 27, 2014	27 years, 309 days 30 years, 171 days	
2014–15	CAN	Meagan Duhamel; Eric Radford	4605	March 26, 2015	29 years, 108 days 30 years, 58 days	
2015–16	CAN	Meagan Duhamel; Eric Radford	5020	April 2, 2016	30 years, 116 days 31 years, 66 days	
2016–17	CAN	Meagan Duhamel; Eric Radford	4878	March 30, 2017	31 years, 112 days 32 years, 62 days	
2017–18	GER	Aljona Savchenko; Bruno Massot	5270	March 22, 2018	34 years, 62 days 29 years, 53 days	
2018–19	RUS	Evgenia Tarasova; Vladimir Morozov	5103	March 21, 2019	24 years, 94 days 26 years, 140 days	
2019–20	RUS	Evgenia Tarasova; Vladimir Morozov	4392	April 16, 2020^{#}	25 years, 121 days 27 years, 167 days	
2020–21	CHN	Peng Cheng; Jin Yang	3662	March 25, 2021	23 years, 336 days 26 years, 313 days	
2021–22	RUS	Anastasia Mishina; Aleksandr Galliamov	4391	March 24, 2022	20 years, 334 days 22 years, 208 days	
2022–23	USA	Alexa Knierim; Brandon Frazier	4491	March 23, 2023	31 years, 286 days 30 years, 124 days	
2023–24	CAN	Deanna Stellato-Dudek; Maxime Deschamps	4859	March 21, 2024	40 years, 273 days 32 years, 92 days	
2024–25	GER	Minerva Fabienne Hase; Nikita Volodin	5322	March 27, 2025	25 years, 290 days 25 years, 271 days	
2025–26	GER	Minerva Fabienne Hase; Nikita Volodin	5768	March 26, 2026	26 years, 289 days 26 years, 270 days	

^{*}Date the free skating of the World Championships was held.

^{#}Date the 2020 World Championships were officially cancelled.

==== Ice dance ====
Updated through 2025–26

Season's-end No. 1 (ice dance)
Season	Nation	Skater	Points	Date^{*}	Age	Ref
2001–02	FRA	Marina Anissina; Gwendal Peizerat	3930	March 22, 2002	26 years, 204 days 29 years, 335 days	
2002–03	RUS	Irina Lobacheva; Ilia Averbukh	3680	March 28, 2003	30 years, 38 days 29 years, 100 days	
2003–04	BUL	Albena Denkova; Maxim Staviski	4755	March 26, 2004	29 years, 114 days 26 years, 131 days	
2004–05	RUS	Tatiana Navka; Roman Kostomarov	4925	March 18, 2005	29 years, 339 days 28 years, 38 days	
2005–06	RUS	Tatiana Navka; Roman Kostomarov	4960	March 24, 2006	30 years, 345 days 29 years, 44 days	
2006–07	CAN	Marie-France Dubreuil; Patrice Lauzon	4570	March 23, 2007	32 years, 224 days 31 years, 117 days	
2007–08	FRA	Isabelle Delobel; Olivier Schoenfelder	4316	March 21, 2008	29 years, 278 days 30 years, 112 days	
2008–09	RUS	Oksana Domnina; Maxim Shabalin	4589	March 27, 2009	24 years, 222 days 27 years, 61 days	
2009–10	USA	Meryl Davis; Charlie White	4453	March 26, 2010	23 years, 84 days 22 years, 153 days	
2010–11	USA	Meryl Davis; Charlie White	4984	April 30, 2011	24 years, 119 days 23 years, 188 days	
2011–12	USA	Meryl Davis; Charlie White	5015	March 29, 2012	25 years, 88 days 24 years, 157 days	
2012–13	USA	Meryl Davis; Charlie White	4840	March 16, 2013	26 years, 74 days 25 years, 143 days	
2013–14	USA	Meryl Davis; Charlie White	5210	March 29, 2014	27 years, 87 days 26 years, 156 days	
2014–15	CAN	Kaitlyn Weaver; Andrew Poje	4837	March 27, 2015	25 years, 349 days 28 years, 30 days	
2015–16	USA	Madison Chock; Evan Bates	5020	March 31, 2016	23 years, 273 days 27 years, 37 days	
2016–17	USA	Madison Chock; Evan Bates	4853	April 1, 2017	24 years, 273 days 28 years, 37 days	
2017–18	CAN	Tessa Virtue; Scott Moir	5320	March 24, 2018	28 years, 311 days 30 years, 203 days	
2018–19	USA	Madison Hubbell; Zachary Donohue	5202	March 23, 2019	28 years, 27 days 28 years, 74 days	
2019–20	RUS	Victoria Sinitsina; Nikita Katsalapov	4642	April 16, 2020^{#}	24 years, 353 days 28 years, 281 days	
2020–21	RUS	Victoria Sinitsina; Nikita Katsalapov	4178	March 27, 2021	25 years, 332 days 29 years, 260 days	
2021–22	USA	Madison Chock; Evan Bates	4013	March 26, 2022	29 years, 267 days 33 years, 31 days	
2022–23	ITA	Charlène Guignard; Marco Fabbri	4623	March 25, 2023	33 years, 225 days 35 years, 51 days	
2023–24	ITA	Charlène Guignard; Marco Fabbri	5240	March 23, 2024	34 years, 224 days 36 years, 50 days	
2024–25	GBR	Lilah Fear; Lewis Gibson	5086	March 29, 2025	25 years, 291 days 30 years, 332 days	
2025–26	GBR	Lilah Fear; Lewis Gibson	5101	March 28, 2026	26 years, 290 days 31 years, 331 days	

^{*}Date the free skating of the World Championships was held.

^{#}Date the 2020 World Championships were officially cancelled.

==== All disciplines ====
Updated through 2025–26

Season's-end No 1 (each discipline)
Season	Men's singles	Women's singles	Pairs	Ice dance
2001–02	(Russia); Evgeni Plushenko	(Russia); Irina Slutskaya	(Russia); Elena Berezhnaya; Anton Sikharulidze	(France); Marina Anissina; Gwendal Peizerat
2002–03	(Russia); Evgeni Plushenko	(United States); Michelle Kwan	(China); Shen Xue; Zhao Hongbo	(Russia); Irina Lobacheva; Ilia Averbukh
2003–04	(Russia); Evgeni Plushenko	(United States); Sasha Cohen	(China); Shen Xue; Zhao Hongbo	(Bulgaria); Albena Denkova; Maxim Staviski
2004–05	(Russia); Evgeni Plushenko	(Japan); Shizuka Arakawa	(Russia); Maria Petrova; Alexei Tikhonov	(Russia); Tatiana Navka; Roman Kostomarov
2005–06	(Canada); Jeffrey Buttle	(Russia); Irina Slutskaya	(Russia); Maria Petrova; Alexei Tikhonov	(Russia); Tatiana Navka; Roman Kostomarov
2006–07	(Japan); Daisuke Takahashi	(Japan); Mao Asada	(China); Zhang Dan; Zhang Hao	(Canada); Marie-France Dubreuil; Patrice Lauzon
2007–08	(Japan); Daisuke Takahashi	(Japan); Mao Asada	(Germany); Aljona Savchenko; Robin Szolkowy	(France); Isabelle Delobel; Olivier Schoenfelder
2008–09	(Czech Republic); Tomáš Verner	(South Korea); Yuna Kim	(Germany); Aljona Savchenko; Robin Szolkowy	(Russia); Oksana Domnina; Maxim Shabalin
2009–10	(United States); Evan Lysacek	(South Korea); Yuna Kim	(Germany); Aljona Savchenko; Robin Szolkowy	(United States); Meryl Davis; Charlie White
2010–11	(Japan); Daisuke Takahashi	(Italy); Carolina Kostner	(Germany); Aljona Savchenko; Robin Szolkowy	(United States); Meryl Davis; Charlie White
2011–12	(Canada); Patrick Chan	(Italy); Carolina Kostner	(Germany); Aljona Savchenko; Robin Szolkowy	(United States); Meryl Davis; Charlie White
2012–13	(Canada); Patrick Chan	(Italy); Carolina Kostner	(Russia); Tatiana Volosozhar; Maxim Trankov	(United States); Meryl Davis; Charlie White
2013–14	(Japan); Yuzuru Hanyu	(Japan); Mao Asada	(Russia); Tatiana Volosozhar; Maxim Trankov	(United States); Meryl Davis; Charlie White
2014–15	(Japan); Yuzuru Hanyu	(Russia); Elizaveta Tuktamysheva	(Canada); Meagan Duhamel; Eric Radford	(Canada); Kaitlyn Weaver; Andrew Poje
2015–16	(Japan); Yuzuru Hanyu	(Japan); Satoko Miyahara	(Canada); Meagan Duhamel; Eric Radford	(United States); Madison Chock; Evan Bates
2016–17	(Japan); Yuzuru Hanyu	(Russia); Evgenia Medvedeva	(Canada); Meagan Duhamel; Eric Radford	(United States); Madison Chock; Evan Bates
2017–18	(Japan); Yuzuru Hanyu	(Canada); Kaetlyn Osmond	(Germany); Aljona Savchenko; Bruno Massot	(Canada); Tessa Virtue; Scott Moir
2018–19	(United States); Nathan Chen	(Russia); Alina Zagitova	(Russia); Evgenia Tarasova; Vladimir Morozov	(United States); Madison Hubbell; Zachary Donohue
2019–20	(Japan); Yuzuru Hanyu	(Japan); Rika Kihira	(Russia); Evgenia Tarasova; Vladimir Morozov	(Russia); Victoria Sinitsina; Nikita Katsalapov
2020–21	(United States); Nathan Chen	(Japan); Rika Kihira	(China); Peng Cheng; Jin Yang	(Russia); Victoria Sinitsina; Nikita Katsalapov
2021–22	(United States); Nathan Chen	(Russia); Anna Shcherbakova	(Russia); Anastasia Mishina; Aleksandr Galliamov	(United States); Madison Chock; Evan Bates
2022–23	(Japan); Shoma Uno	(Japan); Kaori Sakamoto	(United States); Alexa Knierim; Brandon Frazier	(Italy); Charlène Guignard; Marco Fabbri
2023–24	(United States); Ilia Malinin	(Japan); Kaori Sakamoto	(Canada); Deanna Stellato-Dudek; Maxime Deschamps	(Italy); Charlène Guignard; Marco Fabbri
2024–25	(United States); Ilia Malinin	(Japan); Kaori Sakamoto	(Germany); Minerva Fabienne Hase; Nikita Volodin	(United Kingdom); Lilah Fear; Lewis Gibson
2025–26	(United States); Ilia Malinin	(Japan); Kaori Sakamoto	(Germany); Minerva Fabienne Hase; Nikita Volodin	(United Kingdom); Lilah Fear; Lewis Gibson

== Junior single & pair skating and ice dance ==
The Junior World Standings are used as basis for the draw of the first segments at the ISU World Junior Figure Skating Championships.

=== Principles and point distribution ===
The principles and point distribution of the Junior World Standings are in accordance to "ISU Communications 2550 and 2812" published by the ISU in 2023 and 2026 respectively.

The 2023–24 season was the first to see a dedicated junior standings system introduced. The method used to calculate standings was last amended prior to the start of the 2026–27 season, modifying the distribution of points for each event. This new points system rewards higher-tiered international competitions over the lower-tiered, while also replacing the algorithmic '10% steps' point distribution with manually tailored point spreads.

The Junior World Standings are calculated from the results of the current season and the preceding two seasons. The number of points scored by each skater/team depends on the final placement and the total amount of points designated for that particular event. Current and intermediate season's earned points will count for 100% of their value, and previous season's earned points will count for 70% of their value. After the current season's Junior World Championships, the results from the earliest season are deleted.

If pairs and ice dance teams officially split up, their partnership will be removed from the standings. Any new partnership starts with zero points; there is no transfer of WS points if pairs or ice dance skaters form a new partnership. When a skater/team officially announces their retirement from competition, they will be removed from the standings.

The following events earn points, with limits on how many results count towards a skater/team's Junior WS:

- ISU World Junior Championships: The best two results by points over three seasons
- ISU Junior Grand Prix (including Final): The best four results by points over three seasons (maximum two results per season).
- International Competitions Junior: The best four results by points over three seasons (maximum two results per season).

The Junior World Standings order will be updated after each event mentioned in the following point distribution table. Only eligible skaters/teams are considered in the standings.

Distribution of Points

Place	WJC	JGPF	JGP	JIC
1	600	450	300	100
2	540	400	270	80
3	490	360	245	60
4	450	320	220	40
5	410	280	200	20
6	370	250	180	
7	340		160	
8	310		140	
9	280		120	
10	250		100	
11	220			
12	190			
13	160			
14	140			
15	120			
16	110			
17	100			
18	90			
19	80			
20	70			
21	65			
22	60			
23	55			
24	50			
Event	5550	2060	1935	300

- WJC = World Junior Championships
- JGPF = Junior Grand Prix Final
- JGP = Junior Grand Prix
- JIC = Junior International Competition

=== Current junior standings ===
Junior World Standings calculated from the current 2026–27 season (100% point value), as well as the 2025–26 season (100% point value) and 2024–25 season (70% point value).

==== Junior men's singles ====
Top 10 as of November 2, 2026
Rank	Nation	Skater	Points
1	JPN	Rio Nakata	1789
2	KOR	Seo Min-kyu	1761
3	BEL	Denis Krouglov	1603
4	KOR	Choi Ha-bin	1578
5	NZL	Dwayne Li	1463
6	JPN	Taiga Nishino	1350
7	UKR	Yehor Kurtsev	1267
8	GER	Genrikh Gartung	1245
9	KOR	Lee Jae-keun	1213
10	THA	Hiro Kaewtathip	1138

==== Junior women's singles ====
Top 10 as of November 2, 2026
Rank	Nation	Skater	Points
1	JPN	Mao Shimada	1870
2	ISR	Sophia Shifrin	1609
3	AUS	Hana Bath	1593
4	SUI	Leandra Tzimpoukakis	1468
5	FRA	Stefania Gladki	1456
6	GEO	Inga Gurgenidze	1428
7	CHN	Yihan Wang	1368
8	EST	Elina Goidina	1301
9	JPN	Mei Okada	1298
10	KOR	Kim Yu-seong	1112

==== Junior pairs ====
Top 10 as of October 9, 2026
Rank	Nation	Team	Points
1	CAN	Jazmine Desrochers; Kieran Thrasher	1571
2	USA	Reagan Moss; Jakub Galbavy	1371
3	CHN	Yuxuan Chen; Yinbo Dong	1368
4	CAN	Ava Kemp; Yohnatan Elizarov	1240
4	CHN	Rui Guo; YIwen Zhang	1240
6	FRA	Romane Telemaque; Lucas Coulon	1186
7	ITA	Polina Polman; Gabriel Renoldi	919
8	ITA	Irina Napolitano; Edoardo Comi	917
9	USA	Sofia Jarmoc; Luke Witkowski	907
10	ESP	Anita Mapelli; Noah Quesada Grau	882

==== Junior ice dance ====
Top 10 as of November 2, 2026
Rank	Nation	Team	Points
1	USA	Hana Maria Aboian; Daniil Veselukhin	2256
2	FRA	Ambre Perrier Gianesini; Samuel Blanc Klaperman	2054
3	UKR	Iryna Pidgaina; Artem Koval	1889
4	FRA	Dania Mouaden; Theo Bigot	1618
5	ITA	Zoe Bianchi; Daniel Basile	1594
6	ITA	Arianna Soldati; Nicholas Tagliabue	1541
7	CAN	Layla Veillon; Alexander Brandys	1181
8	FRA	Lea Hienne; Louis Varescon	1136
9	CZE	Diane Sznajder; Jachym Novak	1102
10	GER	Alexia Kruk; Jan Eisenhaber	983

=== Season-end No. 1 skaters ===
Chronological list, by discipline, of the No. 1 in the Junior World Standings at the end of each respective season.

==== Junior men's singles ====
Updated through 2025–26

Season's-end No. 1 (Jr. men's)
Season	Nation	Skater	Points	Date^{*}	Age	Ref
2023–24	JPN	Rio Nakata	1457	March 2, 2024	15 years, 176 days	
2024–25	JPN	Rio Nakata	2084	February 28, 2025	16 years, 173 days	
2025–26	JPN	Rio Nakata	2099	March 6, 2026	17 years, 179 days	

^{*}Date the free skating of the World Junior Championships was held.

==== Junior women's singles ====
Updated through 2025–26

Season's-end No. 1 (Jr. women's)
Season	Nation	Skater	Points	Date^{*}	Age	Ref
2023–24	JPN	Mao Shimada	2200	March 1, 2024	15 years, 123 days	
2024–25	JPN	Mao Shimada	2200	March 1, 2025	16 years, 122 days	
2025–26	JPN	Mao Shimada	2200	March 7, 2026	17 years, 128 days	

^{*}Date the free skating of the World Junior Championships was held.

==== Junior pairs ====
Updated through 2025–26

Season's-end No. 1 (Jr. pairs)
Season	Nation	Skater	Points	Date^{*}	Age	Ref
2023–24	AUS	Anastasia Golubeva; Hektor Giotopoulos Moore	1595	February 29, 2024	18 years, 57 days 21 years, 249 days	
2024–25	USA	Olivia Flores; Luke Wang	1740	March 1, 2025	17 years, 201 days 20 years, 357 days	
2025–26	CAN	Jazmine Desrochers; Kieran Thrasher	1803	March 5, 2026	19 years, 211 days 21 years, 307 days	

^{*}Date the free skating of the World Junior Championships was held.

==== Junior ice dance ====
Updated through 2025–26

Season's-end No. 1 (Jr. ice dance)
Season	Nation	Skater	Points	Date^{*}	Age	Ref
2023–24	USA	Leah Neset; Artem Markelov	1846	March 2, 2024	18 years, 86 days 20 years, 236 days	
2024–25	FRA	Célina Fradji; Jean-Hans Fourneaux	2043	February 27, 2025	19 years, 232 days 21 years, 178 days	
2025–26	UKR	Iryna Pidgaina; Artem Koval	2209	March 7, 2026	17 years, 164 days 21 years, 193 days	

^{*}Date the free skating of the World Junior Championships was held.

==== All junior disciplines ====
Updated through 2025–26

Season's-end No 1 (each Jr. discipline)
Season	Jr. men's singles	Jr. women's singles	Jr. pairs	Jr. ice dance
2023–24	(Japan) Rio Nakata	(Japan) Mao Shimada	(Australia); Anastasia Golubeva; Hektor Giotopoulos Moore	(United States); Leah Neset; Artem Markelov
2024–25	(Japan) Rio Nakata	(Japan) Mao Shimada	(United States); Olivia Flores; Luke Wang	(France); Célina Fradji; Jean-Hans Fourneaux
2025–26	(Japan) Rio Nakata	(Japan) Mao Shimada	(Canada); Jazmine Desrochers; Kieran Thrasher	(Ukraine); Iryna Pidgaina; Artem Koval

== Synchronized skating ==
=== Principles and point distribution ===
According to the "ISU Communication 1630" published by the ISU on July 21, 2010, the world standing of a team is calculated based on the results over the current and preceding two seasons. The "ISU Communication 2813" published by the ISU on July 29, 2026 modified the distribution of points for each event, starting with the 2026-27 season.

The ISU World Standings order will be updated after each event mentioned in the following table. Only eligible teams will be considered in the ISU World Standings.

Distribution of Points

Place	Championships (incl. Synchro9)		Challenger Series Competitions		International Competitions (incl. Synchro9)	
Place	WC	WJC	CS Sen.	CS Jun.	IC Sen.	IC Jun.
1	850	600	500	300	250	200
2	760	540	450	270	225	180
3	680	490	400	245	200	160
4	610	450	360	220	180	140
5	550	410	320	200	165	125
6	500	370	280	180	150	110
7	460	340	240	160	135	100
8	420	310	210	140	120	90
9	380	280	180	120		
10	340	250	150	100		
11	300	220				
12	260	190				
13	230	160				
14	200	140				
15	180	120				
16	160	110				
17	140	100				
18	120	90				
19	110	80				
20	100	70				
Event	7350	5320	3090	1935	1425	1105

- WC = World Championships (incl. Synchro9 World Championships)
- WJC = Junior World Championships (incl. Synchro9 Junior World Championships)
- CS Sen. = Challenger Series Senior
- CS Jun. = Challenger Series Junior
- IC Sen. = International Competition Senior and International Synchro9
- IC Jun. = International Competition Junior and International Junior Synchro9

=== Season-end No. 1 teams ===
The remainder of this section is a complete list, by level, of all teams who are the No. 1 in the season-end standings ordered chronologically.

==== Senior Synchronized ====
Season	Team	Points	Notes
2014–15	(Finland) Team Marigold Ice Unity	3120	
2015–16	(Russia) Team Paradise	2892	
2016–17	(Russia) Team Paradise	3280	
2017–18	(Russia) Team Paradise	3120	

==== Junior Synchronized ====
Season	Team	Points	Notes
2014–15	(Finland) Team Fintastic Junior	1768	
2015–16	(Canada) Team Les Suprêmes Junior	1728	
2016–17	(United States) Team Skyliners Junior	1780	
2017–18	(Russia) Team Junost Junior	1950	

=== Teams in the top 3 of the season-end Standings ===
The remainder of this section is a complete list, by level, of all teams who are in the top 3 of the season-end standings ordered chronologically.

==== Senior Synchronized ====
Season	Season-end No. 1		Season-end No. 2		Season-end No. 3		Notes
Season	Team	Points	Team	Points	Team	Points	Notes
2014–15	(Finland) Team Marigold Ice Unity	3120	(Canada) Team Nexxice Senior	2885	(Finland) Team Rockettes	2732	
2015–16	(Russia) Team Paradise	2892	(Finland) Team Rockettes	2848	(Finland) Team Marigold Ice Unity	2824	
2016–17	(Russia) Team Paradise	3280	(Finland) Team Rockettes	2827	(Finland) Team Marigold Ice Unity	2765	
2017–18	(Russia) Team Paradise	3120	(Finland) Team Marigold Ice Unity	2968	(Finland) Team Rockettes	2564	

==== Junior Synchronized ====
Season	Season-end No. 1		Season-end No. 2		Season-end No. 3		Notes
Season	Team	Points	Team	Points	Team	Points	Notes
2014–15	(Finland) Team Fintastic Junior	1768	(Finland) Team Musketeers Junior	1693	(Canada) Team Les Suprêmes Junior	1563	
2015–16	(Canada) Team Les Suprêmes Junior	1728	(Finland) Team Fintastic Junior	1683	(Finland) Team Musketeers Junior	1596	
2016–17	(United States) Team Skyliners Junior	1780	(Finland) Team Fintastic Junior	1672	(Canada) Team Les Suprêmes Junior	1629	
2017–18	(Russia) Team Junost Junior	1950	(United States) Team Skyliners Junior	1905	(Finland) Team Fintastic Junior	1567	
