= 2001–02 ISU World Standings =

Merit-based ice skating ranking

Season-end No. 1 skaters
- Men's singles: (Russia) Evgeni Plushenko
- Ladies' singles: (Russia) Irina Slutskaya
- Pairs: (Russia) Elena Berezhnaya / Anton Sikharulidze
- Ice dance: (France) Marina Anissina / Gwendal Peizerat

Navigation

The 2001–02 ISU World Standings, are the World Standings published by the International Skating Union (ISU) during the 2001–02 season.

The 2001–02 ISU World Standings for single & pair skating and ice dance, are taking into account results of the 1998–99, 1999–2000, 2000–01 and 2001–02 seasons.

== World Standings for single & pair skating and ice dance ==
=== Season-end standings ===
The remainder of this section is a list, by discipline, published by the ISU.

==== Men's singles (18 skaters) ====
As of 21 March 2002

| Rank | Nation | Skater | Points | Season | ISU Championships or Olympics | (Junior) Grand Prix and Final | | Selected International Competition | |
| Rank | Nation | Skater | Points | Season | Best | Best | 2nd Best | Best | 2nd Best |
|---|---|---|---|---|---|---|---|---|---|
| 1 | RUS | Evgeni Plushenko | 4175 | 2001/2002 season(100%) | 1150 | 519 | 364 | 0 | 0 |
| 1 | RUS | Evgeni Plushenko | 4175 | 2000/2001 season(100%) | 1200 | 525 | 417 | 0 | 0 |
| 1 | RUS | Evgeni Plushenko | 4175 | 1999/2000 season (70%) | 735 | 261 | 232 | 0 | 0 |
| 1 | RUS | Evgeni Plushenko | 4175 | 1998/1999 season (50%) | 575 | 158 | 151 | 0 | 0 |
| 2 | RUS | Alexei Yagudin | 4021 | 2001/2002 season(100%) | 1200 | 522 | 441 | 0 | 0 |
| 2 | RUS | Alexei Yagudin | 4021 | 2000/2001 season(100%) | 1150 | 404 | 304 | 0 | 0 |
| 2 | RUS | Alexei Yagudin | 4021 | 1999/2000 season (70%) | 840 | 273 | 253 | 0 | 0 |
| 2 | RUS | Alexei Yagudin | 4021 | 1998/1999 season (50%) | 600 | 172 | 151 | 0 | 0 |
| 3 | USA | Timothy Goebel | 3709 | 2001/2002 season(100%) | 1150 | 433 | 371 | 0 | 0 |
| 3 | USA | Timothy Goebel | 3709 | 2000/2001 season(100%) | 1050 | 358 | 347 | 0 | 0 |
| 3 | USA | Timothy Goebel | 3709 | 1999/2000 season (70%) | 490 | 218 | 210 | 0 | 0 |
| 3 | USA | Timothy Goebel | 3709 | 1998/1999 season (50%) | 325 | 0 | 0 | 0 | 0 |
| 4 | USA | Todd Eldredge | 3353 | 2001/2002 season(100%) | 950 | 435 | 294 | 0 | 0 |
| 4 | USA | Todd Eldredge | 3353 | 2000/2001 season(100%) | 1100 | 336 | 238 | 0 | 0 |
| 4 | USA | Todd Eldredge | 3353 | 1999/2000 season (70%) | 515 | 137 | 0 | 0 | 0 |
| 4 | USA | Todd Eldredge | 3353 | 1998/1999 season (50%) | 0 | 0 | 0 | 0 | 0 |
| 5 | JPN | Takeshi Honda | 3116 | 2001/2002 season(100%) | 1100 | 309 | 263 | 0 | 0 |
| 5 | JPN | Takeshi Honda | 3116 | 2000/2001 season(100%) | 1000 | 262 | 67 | 0 | 0 |
| 5 | JPN | Takeshi Honda | 3116 | 1999/2000 season (70%) | 525 | 182 | 43 | 0 | 0 |
| 5 | JPN | Takeshi Honda | 3116 | 1998/1999 season (50%) | 475 | 132 | 25 | 0 | 0 |
| 6 | CHN | Chengjiang Li | 2980 | 2001/2002 season(100%) | 1000 | 346 | 0 | 0 | 0 |
| 6 | CHN | Chengjiang Li | 2980 | 2000/2001 season(100%) | 900 | 350 | 278 | 0 | 0 |
| 6 | CHN | Chengjiang Li | 2980 | 1999/2000 season (70%) | 700 | 46 | 0 | 0 | 0 |
| 6 | CHN | Chengjiang Li | 2980 | 1998/1999 season (50%) | 403 | 106 | 0 | 0 | 0 |
| 7 | RUS | Alexander Abt | 2809 | 2001/2002 season(100%) | 1050 | 260 | 247 | 0 | 0 |
| 7 | RUS | Alexander Abt | 2809 | 2000/2001 season(100%) | 850 | 208 | 60 | 0 | 0 |
| 7 | RUS | Alexander Abt | 2809 | 1999/2000 season (70%) | 665 | 194 | 91 | 0 | 0 |
| 7 | RUS | Alexander Abt | 2809 | 1998/1999 season (50%) | 0 | 124 | 114 | 0 | 0 |
| 8 | CAN | Elvis Stojko | 2544 | 2001/2002 season(100%) | 850 | 368 | 87 | 0 | 0 |
| 8 | CAN | Elvis Stojko | 2544 | 2000/2001 season(100%) | 750 | 0 | 0 | 0 | 0 |
| 8 | CAN | Elvis Stojko | 2544 | 1999/2000 season (70%) | 805 | 228 | 168 | 0 | 0 |
| 8 | CAN | Elvis Stojko | 2544 | 1998/1999 season (50%) | 525 | 126 | 46 | 0 | 0 |
| 9 | USA | Matthew Savoie | 2268 | 2001/2002 season(100%) | 700 | 182 | 62 | 0 | 0 |
| 9 | USA | Matthew Savoie | 2268 | 2000/2001 season(100%) | 735 | 269 | 227 | 0 | 0 |
| 9 | USA | Matthew Savoie | 2268 | 1999/2000 season (70%) | 308 | 155 | 42 | 0 | 0 |
| 9 | USA | Matthew Savoie | 2268 | 1998/1999 season (50%) | 210 | 26 | 21 | 0 | 0 |
| 10 | USA | Michael Weiss | 2251 | 2001/2002 season(100%) | 950 | 185 | 0 | 0 | 0 |
| 10 | USA | Michael Weiss | 2251 | 2000/2001 season(100%) | 770 | 57 | 0 | 0 | 0 |
| 10 | USA | Michael Weiss | 2251 | 1999/2000 season (70%) | 770 | 126 | 35 | 0 | 0 |
| 10 | USA | Michael Weiss | 2251 | 1998/1999 season (50%) | 550 | 143 | 77 | 0 | 0 |
| 11 | RUS | Ilia Klimkin | 2153 | 2001/2002 season(100%) | 665 | 62 | 61 | 111 | 0 |
| 11 | RUS | Ilia Klimkin | 2153 | 2000/2001 season(100%) | 0 | 437 | 284 | 0 | 0 |
| 11 | RUS | Ilia Klimkin | 2153 | 1999/2000 season (70%) | 294 | 174 | 0 | 126 | 0 |
| 11 | RUS | Ilia Klimkin | 2153 | 1998/1999 season (50%) | 240 | 35 | 35 | 0 | 0 |
| 12 | GER | Andrejs Vlascenko | 2135 | 2001/2002 season(100%) | 750 | 348 | 74 | 0 | 0 |
| 12 | GER | Andrejs Vlascenko | 2135 | 2000/2001 season(100%) | 665 | 87 | 0 | 0 | 0 |
| 12 | GER | Andrejs Vlascenko | 2135 | 1999/2000 season (70%) | 441 | 116 | 39 | 70 | 0 |
| 12 | GER | Andrejs Vlascenko | 2135 | 1998/1999 season (50%) | 400 | 99 | 79 | 0 | 0 |
| 13 | BUL | Ivan Dinev | 2010 | 2001/2002 season(100%) | 630 | 243 | 175 | 0 | 0 |
| 13 | BUL | Ivan Dinev | 2010 | 2000/2001 season(100%) | 650 | 171 | 69 | 0 | 0 |
| 13 | BUL | Ivan Dinev | 2010 | 1999/2000 season (70%) | 490 | 141 | 39 | 0 | 0 |
| 13 | BUL | Ivan Dinev | 2010 | 1998/1999 season (50%) | 333 | 86 | 76 | 0 | 0 |
| 14 | AUS | Anthony Liu | 1787 | 2001/2002 season(100%) | 900 | 220 | 44 | 0 | 0 |
| 14 | AUS | Anthony Liu | 1787 | 2000/2001 season(100%) | 550 | 0 | 0 | 0 | 0 |
| 14 | AUS | Anthony Liu | 1787 | 1999/2000 season (70%) | 466 | 0 | 0 | 0 | 0 |
| 14 | AUS | Anthony Liu | 1787 | 1998/1999 season (50%) | 375 | 0 | 0 | 51 | 23 |
| 15 | CAN | Jeffrey Buttle | 1783 | 2001/2002 season(100%) | 850 | 219 | 0 | 126 | 106 |
| 15 | CAN | Jeffrey Buttle | 1783 | 2000/2001 season(100%) | 360 | 51 | 42 | 0 | 0 |
| 15 | CAN | Jeffrey Buttle | 1783 | 1999/2000 season (70%) | 0 | 29 | 17 | 0 | 0 |
| 15 | CAN | Jeffrey Buttle | 1783 | 1998/1999 season (50%) | 0 | 12 | 0 | 0 | 0 |
| 16 | FRA | Stanick Jeannette | 1724 | 2001/2002 season(100%) | 0 | 0 | 0 | 0 | 0 |
| 16 | FRA | Stanick Jeannette | 1724 | 2000/2001 season(100%) | 770 | 253 | 47 | 0 | 0 |
| 16 | FRA | Stanick Jeannette | 1724 | 1999/2000 season (70%) | 630 | 0 | 0 | 24 | 0 |
| 16 | FRA | Stanick Jeannette | 1724 | 1998/1999 season (50%) | 0 | 0 | 0 | 0 | 0 |
| 17 | CHN | Min Zhang | 1631 | 2001/2002 season(100%) | 800 | 87 | 44 | 0 | 0 |
| 17 | CHN | Min Zhang | 1631 | 2000/2001 season(100%) | 700 | 0 | 0 | 0 | 0 |
| 17 | CHN | Min Zhang | 1631 | 1999/2000 season (70%) | 539 | 0 | 0 | 0 | 0 |
| 17 | CHN | Min Zhang | 1631 | 1998/1999 season (50%) | 368 | 0 | 0 | 0 | 0 |
| 18 | USA | Johnny Weir | 1612 | 2001/2002 season(100%) | 735 | 261 | 0 | 0 | 0 |
| 18 | USA | Johnny Weir | 1612 | 2000/2001 season(100%) | 480 | 60 | 24 | 0 | 0 |
| 18 | USA | Johnny Weir | 1612 | 1999/2000 season (70%) | 0 | 42 | 11 | 0 | 0 |
| 18 | USA | Johnny Weir | 1612 | 1998/1999 season (50%) | 0 | 35 | 0 | 0 | 0 |

==== Ladies' singles (12 skaters) ====
As of 23 March 2002

| Rank | Nation | Skater | Points | Season | ISU Championships or Olympics | (Junior) Grand Prix and Final | | Selected International Competition | |
| Rank | Nation | Skater | Points | Season | Best | Best | 2nd Best | Best | 2nd Best |
|---|---|---|---|---|---|---|---|---|---|
| 1 | RUS | Irina Slutskaya | 3989 | 2001/2002 season(100%) | 1200 | 399 | 360 | 0 | 0 |
| 1 | RUS | Irina Slutskaya | 3989 | 2000/2001 season(100%) | 1150 | 449 | 431 | 0 | 0 |
| 1 | RUS | Irina Slutskaya | 3989 | 1999/2000 season (70%) | 805 | 213 | 174 | 0 | 0 |
| 1 | RUS | Irina Slutskaya | 3989 | 1998/1999 season (50%) | 0 | 126 | 124 | 0 | 0 |
| 2 | USA | Sarah Hughes | 3748 | 2001/2002 season(100%) | 1200 | 478 | 321 | 0 | 0 |
| 2 | USA | Sarah Hughes | 3748 | 2000/2001 season(100%) | 1100 | 287 | 285 | 0 | 0 |
| 2 | USA | Sarah Hughes | 3748 | 1999/2000 season (70%) | 700 | 165 | 129 | 77 | 0 |
| 2 | USA | Sarah Hughes | 3748 | 1998/1999 season (50%) | 450 | 30 | 30 | 0 | 0 |
| 3 | USA | Michelle Kwan | 3725 | 2001/2002 season(100%) | 1150 | 375 | 319 | 0 | 0 |
| 3 | USA | Michelle Kwan | 3725 | 2000/2001 season(100%) | 1200 | 343 | 338 | 0 | 0 |
| 3 | USA | Michelle Kwan | 3725 | 1999/2000 season (70%) | 840 | 258 | 242 | 0 | 0 |
| 3 | USA | Michelle Kwan | 3725 | 1998/1999 season (50%) | 575 | 0 | 0 | 0 | 0 |
| 4 | RUS | Maria Butyrskaya | 3478 | 2001/2002 season(100%) | 950 | 385 | 356 | 0 | 0 |
| 4 | RUS | Maria Butyrskaya | 3478 | 2000/2001 season(100%) | 1050 | 374 | 363 | 0 | 0 |
| 4 | RUS | Maria Butyrskaya | 3478 | 1999/2000 season (70%) | 770 | 290 | 248 | 0 | 0 |
| 4 | RUS | Maria Butyrskaya | 3478 | 1998/1999 season (50%) | 600 | 147 | 141 | 0 | 0 |
| 5 | RUS | Viktoria Volchkova | 3179 | 2001/2002 season(100%) | 900 | 277 | 250 | 115 | 0 |
| 5 | RUS | Viktoria Volchkova | 3179 | 2000/2001 season(100%) | 950 | 303 | 171 | 0 | 0 |
| 5 | RUS | Viktoria Volchkova | 3179 | 1999/2000 season (70%) | 665 | 242 | 207 | 73 | 0 |
| 5 | RUS | Viktoria Volchkova | 3179 | 1998/1999 season (50%) | 385 | 35 | 35 | 70 | 0 |
| 6 | UKR | Elena Liashenko | 2798 | 2001/2002 season(100%) | 950 | 238 | 55 | 0 | 0 |
| 6 | UKR | Elena Liashenko | 2798 | 2000/2001 season(100%) | 850 | 165 | 72 | 0 | 0 |
| 6 | UKR | Elena Liashenko | 2798 | 1999/2000 season (70%) | 525 | 200 | 145 | 152 | 71 |
| 6 | UKR | Elena Liashenko | 2798 | 1998/1999 season (50%) | 425 | 172 | 74 | 0 | 0 |
| 7 | JPN | Fumie Suguri | 2752 | 2001/2002 season(100%) | 1100 | 239 | 0 | 0 | 0 |
| 7 | JPN | Fumie Suguri | 2752 | 2000/2001 season(100%) | 900 | 271 | 75 | 0 | 0 |
| 7 | JPN | Fumie Suguri | 2752 | 1999/2000 season (70%) | 515 | 0 | 0 | 0 | 0 |
| 7 | JPN | Fumie Suguri | 2752 | 1998/1999 season (50%) | 350 | 143 | 99 | 0 | 0 |
| 8 | JPN | Yoshie Onda | 2420 | 2001/2002 season(100%) | 1000 | 297 | 296 | 0 | 0 |
| 8 | JPN | Yoshie Onda | 2420 | 2000/2001 season(100%) | 770 | 0 | 0 | 0 | 0 |
| 8 | JPN | Yoshie Onda | 2420 | 1999/2000 season (70%) | 490 | 23 | 17 | 0 | 0 |
| 8 | JPN | Yoshie Onda | 2420 | 1998/1999 season (50%) | 80 | 35 | 12 | 0 | 0 |
| 9 | USA | Angela Nikodinov | 2365 | 2001/2002 season(100%) | 0 | 237 | 222 | 0 | 0 |
| 9 | USA | Angela Nikodinov | 2365 | 2000/2001 season(100%) | 1000 | 224 | 57 | 0 | 0 |
| 9 | USA | Angela Nikodinov | 2365 | 1999/2000 season (70%) | 588 | 87 | 0 | 0 | 0 |
| 9 | USA | Angela Nikodinov | 2365 | 1998/1999 season (50%) | 385 | 94 | 0 | 0 | 0 |
| 10 | UZB | Tatiana Malinina | 2328 | 2001/2002 season(100%) | 525 | 356 | 60 | 0 | 0 |
| 10 | UZB | Tatiana Malinina | 2328 | 2000/2001 season(100%) | 735 | 299 | 220 | 0 | 0 |
| 10 | UZB | Tatiana Malinina | 2328 | 1999/2000 season (70%) | 441 | 193 | 120 | 0 | 0 |
| 10 | UZB | Tatiana Malinina | 2328 | 1998/1999 season (50%) | 525 | 148 | 137 | 0 | 0 |
| 11 | USA | Jennifer Kirk | 2083 | 2001/2002 season(100%) | 840 | 178 | 0 | 0 | 0 |
| 11 | USA | Jennifer Kirk | 2083 | 2000/2001 season(100%) | 700 | 242 | 75 | 0 | 0 |
| 11 | USA | Jennifer Kirk | 2083 | 1999/2000 season (70%) | 336 | 48 | 42 | 0 | 0 |
| 11 | USA | Jennifer Kirk | 2083 | 1998/1999 season (50%) | 0 | 0 | 0 | 0 | 0 |
| 12 | USA | Sasha Cohen | 2069 | 2001/2002 season(100%) | 1050 | 257 | 62 | 164 | 0 |
| 12 | USA | Sasha Cohen | 2069 | 2000/2001 season(100%) | 0 | 215 | 55 | 0 | 0 |
| 12 | USA | Sasha Cohen | 2069 | 1999/2000 season (70%) | 266 | 48 | 0 | 0 | 0 |
| 12 | USA | Sasha Cohen | 2069 | 1998/1999 season (50%) | 0 | 0 | 0 | 0 | 0 |

==== Pairs (18 couples) ====
As of 20 March 2002

| Rank | Nation | Couple | Points | Season | ISU Championships or Olympics | (Junior) Grand Prix and Final | | Selected International Competition | |
| Rank | Nation | Couple | Points | Season | Best | Best | 2nd Best | Best | 2nd Best |
|---|---|---|---|---|---|---|---|---|---|
| 1 | RUS | Elena Berezhnaya / Anton Sikharulidze | 3729 | 2001/2002 season(100%) | 1200 | 370 | 308 | 0 | 0 |
| 1 | RUS | Elena Berezhnaya / Anton Sikharulidze | 3729 | 2000/2001 season(100%) | 1150 | 371 | 330 | 0 | 0 |
| 1 | RUS | Elena Berezhnaya / Anton Sikharulidze | 3729 | 1999/2000 season (70%) | 0 | 246 | 173 | 0 | 0 |
| 1 | RUS | Elena Berezhnaya / Anton Sikharulidze | 3729 | 1998/1999 season (50%) | 600 | 133 | 126 | 0 | 0 |
| 2 | CAN | Jamie Salé / David Pelletier | 3723 | 2001/2002 season(100%) | 1200 | 370 | 287 | 0 | 0 |
| 2 | CAN | Jamie Salé / David Pelletier | 3723 | 2000/2001 season(100%) | 1200 | 333 | 333 | 0 | 0 |
| 2 | CAN | Jamie Salé / David Pelletier | 3723 | 1999/2000 season (70%) | 735 | 260 | 220 | 0 | 0 |
| 2 | CAN | Jamie Salé / David Pelletier | 3723 | 1998/1999 season (50%) | 0 | 99 | 60 | 0 | 0 |
| 3 | CHN | Xue Shen / Hongbo Zhao | 3476 | 2001/2002 season(100%) | 1200 | 338 | 247 | 0 | 0 |
| 3 | CHN | Xue Shen / Hongbo Zhao | 3476 | 2000/2001 season(100%) | 1100 | 309 | 282 | 0 | 0 |
| 3 | CHN | Xue Shen / Hongbo Zhao | 3476 | 1999/2000 season (70%) | 805 | 185 | 179 | 0 | 0 |
| 3 | CHN | Xue Shen / Hongbo Zhao | 3476 | 1998/1999 season (50%) | 575 | 149 | 105 | 0 | 0 |
| 4 | RUS | Maria Petrova / Alexei Tikhonov | 3181 | 2001/2002 season(100%) | 1050 | 282 | 256 | 0 | 0 |
| 4 | RUS | Maria Petrova / Alexei Tikhonov | 3181 | 2000/2001 season(100%) | 1050 | 254 | 222 | 0 | 0 |
| 4 | RUS | Maria Petrova / Alexei Tikhonov | 3181 | 1999/2000 season (70%) | 840 | 279 | 264 | 0 | 0 |
| 4 | RUS | Maria Petrova / Alexei Tikhonov | 3181 | 1998/1999 season (50%) | 525 | 124 | 90 | 0 | 0 |
| 5 | RUS | Tatiana Totmianina / Maxim Marinin | 3023 | 2001/2002 season(100%) | 1150 | 209 | 191 | 0 | 0 |
| 5 | RUS | Tatiana Totmianina / Maxim Marinin | 3023 | 2000/2001 season(100%) | 1000 | 222 | 203 | 0 | 0 |
| 5 | RUS | Tatiana Totmianina / Maxim Marinin | 3023 | 1999/2000 season (70%) | 665 | 239 | 144 | 0 | 0 |
| 5 | RUS | Tatiana Totmianina / Maxim Marinin | 3023 | 1998/1999 season (50%) | 450 | 21 | 16 | 0 | 0 |
| 6 | USA | Kyoko Ina / John Zimmerman | 2972 | 2001/2002 season(100%) | 1100 | 308 | 239 | 0 | 0 |
| 6 | USA | Kyoko Ina / John Zimmerman | 2972 | 2000/2001 season(100%) | 900 | 220 | 185 | 0 | 0 |
| 6 | USA | Kyoko Ina / John Zimmerman | 2972 | 1999/2000 season (70%) | 630 | 205 | 144 | 0 | 0 |
| 6 | USA | Kyoko Ina / John Zimmerman | 2972 | 1998/1999 season (50%) | 400 | 84 | 79 | 0 | 0 |
| 7 | FRA | Sarah Abitbol / Stéphane Bernadis | 2786 | 2001/2002 season(100%) | 805 | 247 | 205 | 136 | 0 |
| 7 | FRA | Sarah Abitbol / Stéphane Bernadis | 2786 | 2000/2001 season(100%) | 770 | 305 | 235 | 0 | 0 |
| 7 | FRA | Sarah Abitbol / Stéphane Bernadis | 2786 | 1999/2000 season (70%) | 770 | 288 | 233 | 0 | 0 |
| 7 | FRA | Sarah Abitbol / Stéphane Bernadis | 2786 | 1998/1999 season (50%) | 500 | 95 | 47 | 0 | 0 |
| 8 | POL | Dorota Zagorska / Mariusz Siudek | 2750 | 2001/2002 season(100%) | 950 | 225 | 154 | 0 | 0 |
| 8 | POL | Dorota Zagorska / Mariusz Siudek | 2750 | 2000/2001 season(100%) | 950 | 247 | 166 | 0 | 0 |
| 8 | POL | Dorota Zagorska / Mariusz Siudek | 2750 | 1999/2000 season (70%) | 700 | 192 | 186 | 0 | 0 |
| 8 | POL | Dorota Zagorska / Mariusz Siudek | 2750 | 1998/1999 season (50%) | 550 | 63 | 0 | 0 | 0 |
| 9 | CHN | Qing Pang / Jian Tong | 2195 | 2001/2002 season(100%) | 1000 | 125 | 56 | 0 | 0 |
| 9 | CHN | Qing Pang / Jian Tong | 2195 | 2000/2001 season(100%) | 750 | 141 | 56 | 0 | 0 |
| 9 | CHN | Qing Pang / Jian Tong | 2195 | 1999/2000 season (70%) | 490 | 123 | 36 | 0 | 0 |
| 9 | CHN | Qing Pang / Jian Tong | 2195 | 1998/1999 season (50%) | 350 | 17 | 0 | 0 | 0 |
| 10 | CAN | Kristy Wirtz / Kris Wirtz | 1877 | 2001/2002 season(100%) | 0 | 0 | 0 | 0 | 0 |
| 10 | CAN | Kristy Wirtz / Kris Wirtz | 1877 | 2000/2001 season(100%) | 850 | 153 | 62 | 0 | 0 |
| 10 | CAN | Kristy Wirtz / Kris Wirtz | 1877 | 1999/2000 season (70%) | 525 | 165 | 48 | 0 | 0 |
| 10 | CAN | Kristy Wirtz / Kris Wirtz | 1877 | 1998/1999 season (50%) | 475 | 111 | 74 | 0 | 0 |
| 11 | USA | Tiffany Scott / Philip Dulebohn | 1782 | 2001/2002 season(100%) | 900 | 0 | 0 | 0 | 0 |
| 11 | USA | Tiffany Scott / Philip Dulebohn | 1782 | 2000/2001 season(100%) | 700 | 56 | 0 | 35 | 0 |
| 11 | USA | Tiffany Scott / Philip Dulebohn | 1782 | 1999/2000 season (70%) | 560 | 48 | 43 | 0 | 0 |
| 11 | USA | Tiffany Scott / Philip Dulebohn | 1782 | 1998/1999 season (50%) | 333 | 0 | 0 | 0 | 0 |
| 12 | UKR | Aliona Savchenko / Stanislav Morozov | 1656 | 2001/2002 season(100%) | 500 | 0 | 0 | 0 | 0 |
| 12 | UKR | Aliona Savchenko / Stanislav Morozov | 1656 | 2000/2001 season(100%) | 800 | 56 | 51 | 0 | 0 |
| 12 | UKR | Aliona Savchenko / Stanislav Morozov | 1656 | 1999/2000 season (70%) | 441 | 108 | 48 | 93 | 0 |
| 12 | UKR | Aliona Savchenko / Stanislav Morozov | 1656 | 1998/1999 season (50%) | 130 | 26 | 21 | 0 | 0 |
| 13 | CAN | Anabelle Langlois / Patrice Archetto | 1637 | 2001/2002 season(100%) | 805 | 167 | 0 | 0 | 0 |
| 13 | CAN | Anabelle Langlois / Patrice Archetto | 1637 | 2000/2001 season(100%) | 665 | 0 | 0 | 0 | 0 |
| 13 | CAN | Anabelle Langlois / Patrice Archetto | 1637 | 1999/2000 season (70%) | 0 | 0 | 0 | 0 | 0 |
| 13 | CAN | Anabelle Langlois / Patrice Archetto | 1637 | 1998/1999 season (50%) | 0 | 0 | 0 | 0 | 0 |
| 14 | CZE | Kateřina Beránková / Otto Dlabola | 1633 | 2001/2002 season(100%) | 850 | 0 | 0 | 0 | 0 |
| 14 | CZE | Kateřina Beránková / Otto Dlabola | 1633 | 2000/2001 season(100%) | 650 | 0 | 0 | 0 | 0 |
| 14 | CZE | Kateřina Beránková / Otto Dlabola | 1633 | 1999/2000 season (70%) | 420 | 36 | 0 | 0 | 0 |
| 14 | CZE | Kateřina Beránková / Otto Dlabola | 1633 | 1998/1999 season (50%) | 325 | 45 | 25 | 28 | 0 |
| 15 | CHN | Dan Zhang / Hao Zhang | 1557 | 2001/2002 season(100%) | 800 | 70 | 69 | 0 | 0 |
| 15 | CHN | Dan Zhang / Hao Zhang | 1557 | 2000/2001 season(100%) | 480 | 69 | 69 | 0 | 0 |
| 15 | CHN | Dan Zhang / Hao Zhang | 1557 | 1999/2000 season (70%) | 294 | 48 | 42 | 0 | 0 |
| 15 | CHN | Dan Zhang / Hao Zhang | 1557 | 1998/1999 season (50%) | 0 | 35 | 0 | 0 | 0 |
| 16 | JPN | Yuko Kavaguti / Alexander Markuntsov | 1425 | 2001/2002 season(100%) | 600 | 62 | 48 | 0 | 0 |
| 16 | JPN | Yuko Kavaguti / Alexander Markuntsov | 1425 | 2000/2001 season(100%) | 595 | 69 | 51 | 0 | 0 |
| 16 | JPN | Yuko Kavaguti / Alexander Markuntsov | 1425 | 1999/2000 season (70%) | 0 | 0 | 0 | 0 | 0 |
| 16 | JPN | Yuko Kavaguti / Alexander Markuntsov | 1425 | 1998/1999 season (50%) | 0 | 0 | 0 | 0 | 0 |
| 17 | CAN | Jacinthe Larivière / Lenny Faustino | 1367 | 2001/2002 season(100%) | 850 | 62 | 0 | 39 | 0 |
| 17 | CAN | Jacinthe Larivière / Lenny Faustino | 1367 | 2000/2001 season(100%) | 0 | 56 | 47 | 0 | 0 |
| 17 | CAN | Jacinthe Larivière / Lenny Faustino | 1367 | 1999/2000 season (70%) | 0 | 0 | 0 | 79 | 0 |
| 17 | CAN | Jacinthe Larivière / Lenny Faustino | 1367 | 1998/1999 season (50%) | 180 | 30 | 21 | 24 | 0 |
| 18 | GER | Mariana Kautz / Norman Jeschke | 1286 | 2001/2002 season(100%) | 595 | 0 | 0 | 116 | 0 |
| 18 | GER | Mariana Kautz / Norman Jeschke | 1286 | 2000/2001 season(100%) | 560 | 0 | 0 | 0 | 0 |
| 18 | GER | Mariana Kautz / Norman Jeschke | 1286 | 1999/2000 season (70%) | 490 | 0 | 0 | 0 | 0 |
| 18 | GER | Mariana Kautz / Norman Jeschke | 1286 | 1998/1999 season (50%) | 225 | 15 | 0 | 0 | 0 |

==== Ice dance (6 couples) ====
As of 23 March 2002

| Rank | Nation | Couple | Points | Season | ISU Championships or Olympics | (Junior) Grand Prix and Final | | Selected International Competition | |
| Rank | Nation | Couple | Points | Season | Best | Best | 2nd Best | Best | 2nd Best |
|---|---|---|---|---|---|---|---|---|---|
| 1 | FRA | Marina Anissina / Gwendal Peizerat | 3930 | 2001/2002 season(100%) | 1200 | 397 | 315 | 0 | 0 |
| 1 | FRA | Marina Anissina / Gwendal Peizerat | 3930 | 2000/2001 season(100%) | 1150 | 447 | 421 | 0 | 0 |
| 1 | FRA | Marina Anissina / Gwendal Peizerat | 3930 | 1999/2000 season (70%) | 840 | 309 | 268 | 0 | 0 |
| 1 | FRA | Marina Anissina / Gwendal Peizerat | 3930 | 1998/1999 season (50%) | 575 | 135 | 132 | 0 | 0 |
| 2 | ITA | Barbara Fusar-Poli / Maurizio Margaglio | 3608 | 2001/2002 season(100%) | 1100 | 311 | 238 | 0 | 0 |
| 2 | ITA | Barbara Fusar-Poli / Maurizio Margaglio | 3608 | 2000/2001 season(100%) | 1200 | 376 | 363 | 0 | 0 |
| 2 | ITA | Barbara Fusar-Poli / Maurizio Margaglio | 3608 | 1999/2000 season (70%) | 805 | 258 | 199 | 0 | 0 |
| 2 | ITA | Barbara Fusar-Poli / Maurizio Margaglio | 3608 | 1998/1999 season (50%) | 500 | 113 | 88 | 0 | 0 |
| 3 | CAN | Shae-Lynn Bourne / Victor Kraatz | 3426 | 2001/2002 season(100%) | 1150 | 392 | 367 | 0 | 0 |
| 3 | CAN | Shae-Lynn Bourne / Victor Kraatz | 3426 | 2000/2001 season(100%) | 1050 | 250 | 217 | 0 | 0 |
| 3 | CAN | Shae-Lynn Bourne / Victor Kraatz | 3426 | 1999/2000 season (70%) | 0 | 199 | 136 | 0 | 0 |
| 3 | CAN | Shae-Lynn Bourne / Victor Kraatz | 3426 | 1998/1999 season (50%) | 550 | 132 | 125 | 0 | 0 |
| 4 | RUS | Irina Lobacheva / Ilia Averbukh | 3363 | 2001/2002 season(100%) | 1200 | 0 | 0 | 0 | 0 |
| 4 | RUS | Irina Lobacheva / Ilia Averbukh | 3363 | 2000/2001 season(100%) | 1100 | 372 | 303 | 0 | 0 |
| 4 | RUS | Irina Lobacheva / Ilia Averbukh | 3363 | 1999/2000 season (70%) | 735 | 223 | 165 | 0 | 0 |
| 4 | RUS | Irina Lobacheva / Ilia Averbukh | 3363 | 1998/1999 season (50%) | 525 | 110 | 107 | 0 | 0 |
| 5 | LTU | Margarita Drobiazko / Povilas Vanagas | 3306 | 2001/2002 season(100%) | 1050 | 331 | 261 | 0 | 0 |
| 5 | LTU | Margarita Drobiazko / Povilas Vanagas | 3306 | 2000/2001 season(100%) | 1000 | 351 | 313 | 0 | 0 |
| 5 | LTU | Margarita Drobiazko / Povilas Vanagas | 3306 | 1999/2000 season (70%) | 770 | 206 | 186 | 0 | 0 |
| 5 | LTU | Margarita Drobiazko / Povilas Vanagas | 3306 | 1998/1999 season (50%) | 475 | 110 | 90 | 0 | 0 |
| 6 | ISR | Galit Chait / Sergei Sakhnovski | 3230 | 2001/2002 season(100%) | 1100 | 326 | 259 | 0 | 0 |
| 6 | ISR | Galit Chait / Sergei Sakhnovski | 3230 | 2000/2001 season(100%) | 950 | 330 | 229 | 0 | 0 |
| 6 | ISR | Galit Chait / Sergei Sakhnovski | 3230 | 1999/2000 season (70%) | 700 | 52 | 45 | 36 | 0 |
| 6 | ISR | Galit Chait / Sergei Sakhnovski | 3230 | 1998/1999 season (50%) | 300 | 25 | 23 | 0 | 0 |

== See also ==
- ISU World Standings
- 2001–02 figure skating season
