= 2002–03 ISU World Standings =

Merit-based ice skating ranking

Season-end No. 1 skaters
- Men's singles: (Russia) Evgeni Plushenko
- Ladies' singles: (United States) Michelle Kwan
- Pairs: (China) Xue Shen / Hongbo Zhao
- Ice dance: (Russia) Irina Lobacheva / Ilia Averbukh

Navigation

The 2002–03 ISU World Standings, are the World Standings published by the International Skating Union (ISU) during the 2002–03 season.

The 2002–03 ISU World Standings for single & pair skating and ice dance, are taking into account results of the 1999–2000, 2000–01, 2001–02 and 2002–03 seasons.

== World Standings for single & pair skating and ice dance ==
=== Season-end standings ===
The remainder of this section is a list, by discipline, published by the ISU.

==== Men's singles (12 skaters) ====
As of 29 March 2003

Rank	Nation	Skater	Points	Season	ISU Championships or Olympics	(Junior) Grand Prix and Final		Selected International Competition	
Rank	Nation	Skater	Points	Season	Best	Best	2nd Best	Best	2nd Best
1	RUS	Evgeni Plushenko	4110	2002/2003 season (100%)	1200	452	421	0	0
1	RUS	Evgeni Plushenko	4110	2001/2002 season (100%)	1150	519	364	0	0
1	RUS	Evgeni Plushenko	4110	2000/2001 season (70%)	840	368	292	0	0
1	RUS	Evgeni Plushenko	4110	1999/2000 season (50%)	525	187	166	0	0
2	USA	Timothy Goebel	3598	2002/2003 season (100%)	1150	0	0	0	0
2	USA	Timothy Goebel	3598	2001/2002 season (100%)	1150	433	371	0	0
2	USA	Timothy Goebel	3598	2000/2001 season (70%)	735	251	243	0	0
2	USA	Timothy Goebel	3598	1999/2000 season (50%)	350	156	150	0	0
3	RUS	Alexei Yagudin	3464	2002/2003 season (100%)	0	0	0	0	0
3	RUS	Alexei Yagudin	3464	2001/2002 season (100%)	1200	522	441	0	0
3	RUS	Alexei Yagudin	3464	2000/2001 season (70%)	805	283	213	0	0
3	RUS	Alexei Yagudin	3464	1999/2000 season (50%)	600	195	181	0	0
4	JPN	Takeshi Honda	3312	2002/2003 season (100%)	1100	295	245	0	0
4	JPN	Takeshi Honda	3312	2001/2002 season (100%)	1100	309	263	0	0
4	JPN	Takeshi Honda	3312	2000/2001 season (70%)	700	183	47	0	0
4	JPN	Takeshi Honda	3312	1999/2000 season (50%)	375	130	31	0	0
5	CHN	Chengjiang Li	3294	2002/2003 season (100%)	1050	351	302	0	0
5	CHN	Chengjiang Li	3294	2001/2002 season (100%)	1000	346	0	0	0
5	CHN	Chengjiang Li	3294	2000/2001 season (70%)	630	245	195	0	0
5	CHN	Chengjiang Li	3294	1999/2000 season (50%)	500	33	0	0	0
6	RUS	Alexander Abt	2877	2002/2003 season (100%)	0	377	348	0	0
6	RUS	Alexander Abt	2877	2001/2002 season (100%)	1050	260	247	0	0
6	RUS	Alexander Abt	2877	2000/2001 season (70%)	595	146	42	0	0
6	RUS	Alexander Abt	2877	1999/2000 season (50%)	475	139	65	0	0
7	USA	Todd Eldredge	2851	2002/2003 season (100%)	0	0	0	0	0
7	USA	Todd Eldredge	2851	2001/2002 season (100%)	950	435	294	0	0
7	USA	Todd Eldredge	2851	2000/2001 season (70%)	770	235	167	0	0
7	USA	Todd Eldredge	2851	1999/2000 season (50%)	368	98	0	0	0
8	RUS	Ilia Klimkin	2813	2002/2003 season (100%)	800	294	272	76	0
8	RUS	Ilia Klimkin	2813	2001/2002 season (100%)	665	62	61	111	0
8	RUS	Ilia Klimkin	2813	2000/2001 season (70%)	0	306	199	0	0
8	RUS	Ilia Klimkin	2813	1999/2000 season (50%)	210	125	0	90	0
9	USA	Michael Weiss	2772	2002/2003 season (100%)	1000	321	226	0	0
9	USA	Michael Weiss	2772	2001/2002 season (100%)	950	185	0	0	0
9	USA	Michael Weiss	2772	2000/2001 season (70%)	539	40	0	0	0
9	USA	Michael Weiss	2772	1999/2000 season (50%)	550	90	25	0	0
10	FRA	Brian Joubert	2412	2002/2003 season (100%)	950	417	217	0	0
10	FRA	Brian Joubert	2412	2001/2002 season (100%)	770	0	0	0	0
10	FRA	Brian Joubert	2412	2000/2001 season (70%)	0	29	29	0	0
10	FRA	Brian Joubert	2412	1999/2000 season (50%)	100	0	0	0	0
11	CHN	Min Zhang	2212	2002/2003 season (100%)	805	267	209	0	0
11	CHN	Min Zhang	2212	2001/2002 season (100%)	800	87	44	0	0
11	CHN	Min Zhang	2212	2000/2001 season (70%)	490	0	0	0	0
11	CHN	Min Zhang	2212	1999/2000 season (50%)	385	0	0	0	0
12	CAN	Elvis Stojko	2162	2002/2003 season (100%)	0	0	0	0	0
12	CAN	Elvis Stojko	2162	2001/2002 season (100%)	850	368	87	0	0
12	CAN	Elvis Stojko	2162	2000/2001 season (70%)	525	0	0	0	0
12	CAN	Elvis Stojko	2162	1999/2000 season (50%)	575	163	120	0	0

==== Ladies' singles (6 skaters) ====
As of 29 March 2003

Rank	Nation	Skater	Points	Season	ISU Championships or Olympics	(Junior) Grand Prix and Final		Selected International Competition	
Rank	Nation	Skater	Points	Season	Best	Best	2nd Best	Best	2nd Best
1	USA	Michelle Kwan	3780	2002/2003 season (100%)	1200	496	0	0	0
1	USA	Michelle Kwan	3780	2001/2002 season (100%)	1150	375	319	0	0
1	USA	Michelle Kwan	3780	2000/2001 season (70%)	840	240	237	0	0
1	USA	Michelle Kwan	3780	1999/2000 season (50%)	600	184	173	0	0
2	RUS	Irina Slutskaya	3439	2002/2003 season (100%)	840	326	300	0	0
2	RUS	Irina Slutskaya	3439	2001/2002 season (100%)	1200	399	360	0	0
2	RUS	Irina Slutskaya	3439	2000/2001 season (70%)	805	314	302	0	0
2	RUS	Irina Slutskaya	3439	1999/2000 season (50%)	575	152	125	0	0
3	USA	Sasha Cohen	3436	2002/2003 season (100%)	1050	405	360	0	0
3	USA	Sasha Cohen	3436	2001/2002 season (100%)	1050	257	62	164	0
3	USA	Sasha Cohen	3436	2000/2001 season (70%)	0	151	39	0	0
3	USA	Sasha Cohen	3436	1999/2000 season (50%)	190	35	0	0	0
4	USA	Sarah Hughes	3405	2002/2003 season (100%)	950	0	0	0	0
4	USA	Sarah Hughes	3405	2001/2002 season (100%)	1200	478	321	0	0
4	USA	Sarah Hughes	3405	2000/2001 season (70%)	770	201	200	0	0
4	USA	Sarah Hughes	3405	1999/2000 season (50%)	500	118	92	55	0
5	RUS	Viktoria Volchkova	3240	2002/2003 season (100%)	1000	376	270	0	0
5	RUS	Viktoria Volchkova	3240	2001/2002 season (100%)	900	277	250	115	0
5	RUS	Viktoria Volchkova	3240	2000/2001 season (70%)	665	212	120	0	0
5	RUS	Viktoria Volchkova	3240	1999/2000 season (50%)	475	173	148	52	0
6	JPN	Fumie Suguri	3235	2002/2003 season (100%)	1100	338	268	0	0
6	JPN	Fumie Suguri	3235	2001/2002 season (100%)	1100	239	0	0	0
6	JPN	Fumie Suguri	3235	2000/2001 season (70%)	630	190	53	0	0
6	JPN	Fumie Suguri	3235	1999/2000 season (50%)	368	0	0	0	0

==== Pairs (18 couples) ====
As of 29 March 2003

Rank	Nation	Couple	Points	Season	ISU Championships or Olympics	(Junior) Grand Prix and Final		Selected International Competition	
Rank	Nation	Couple	Points	Season	Best	Best	2nd Best	Best	2nd Best
1	CHN	Xue Shen / Hongbo Zhao	3638	2002/2003 season (100%)	1200	327	326	0	0
1	CHN	Xue Shen / Hongbo Zhao	3638	2001/2002 season (100%)	1200	338	247	0	0
1	CHN	Xue Shen / Hongbo Zhao	3638	2000/2001 season (70%)	770	216	197	0	0
1	CHN	Xue Shen / Hongbo Zhao	3638	1999/2000 season (50%)	575	132	128	0	0
2	RUS	Tatiana Totmianina / Maxim Marinin	3495	2002/2003 season (100%)	1150	399	396	0	0
2	RUS	Tatiana Totmianina / Maxim Marinin	3495	2001/2002 season (100%)	1150	209	191	0	0
2	RUS	Tatiana Totmianina / Maxim Marinin	3495	2000/2001 season (70%)	700	155	142	0	0
2	RUS	Tatiana Totmianina / Maxim Marinin	3495	1999/2000 season (50%)	475	171	103	0	0
3	RUS	Elena Berezhnaya / Anton Sikharulidze	3174	2002/2003 season (100%)	0	0	0	0	0
3	RUS	Elena Berezhnaya / Anton Sikharulidze	3174	2001/2002 season (100%)	1200	370	308	0	0
3	RUS	Elena Berezhnaya / Anton Sikharulidze	3174	2000/2001 season (70%)	805	260	231	0	0
3	RUS	Elena Berezhnaya / Anton Sikharulidze	3174	1999/2000 season (50%)	0	176	124	0	0
4	RUS	Maria Petrova / Alexei Tikhonov	3166	2002/2003 season (100%)	1100	272	206	0	0
4	RUS	Maria Petrova / Alexei Tikhonov	3166	2001/2002 season (100%)	1050	282	256	0	0
4	RUS	Maria Petrova / Alexei Tikhonov	3166	2000/2001 season (70%)	735	178	155	0	0
4	RUS	Maria Petrova / Alexei Tikhonov	3166	1999/2000 season (50%)	600	200	189	0	0
5	CAN	Jamie Salé / David Pelletier	3163	2002/2003 season (100%)	0	0	0	0	0
5	CAN	Jamie Salé / David Pelletier	3163	2001/2002 season (100%)	1200	370	287	0	0
5	CAN	Jamie Salé / David Pelletier	3163	2000/2001 season (70%)	840	233	233	0	0
5	CAN	Jamie Salé / David Pelletier	3163	1999/2000 season (50%)	525	186	157	0	0
6	CHN	Qing Pang / Jian Tong	2870	2002/2003 season (100%)	1050	330	266	0	0
6	CHN	Qing Pang / Jian Tong	2870	2001/2002 season (100%)	1000	125	56	0	0
6	CHN	Qing Pang / Jian Tong	2870	2000/2001 season (70%)	525	99	39	0	0
6	CHN	Qing Pang / Jian Tong	2870	1999/2000 season (50%)	350	88	26	0	0
7	FRA	Sarah Abitbol / Stéphane Bernadis	2745	2002/2003 season (100%)	805	332	0	0	0
7	FRA	Sarah Abitbol / Stéphane Bernadis	2745	2001/2002 season (100%)	805	247	205	136	0
7	FRA	Sarah Abitbol / Stéphane Bernadis	2745	2000/2001 season (70%)	539	214	165	0	0
7	FRA	Sarah Abitbol / Stéphane Bernadis	2745	1999/2000 season (50%)	550	206	167	0	0
8	POL	Dorota Zagorska / Mariusz Siudek	2708	2002/2003 season (100%)	900	273	187	0	0
8	POL	Dorota Zagorska / Mariusz Siudek	2708	2001/2002 season (100%)	950	225	154	0	0
8	POL	Dorota Zagorska / Mariusz Siudek	2708	2000/2001 season (70%)	665	173	116	0	0
8	POL	Dorota Zagorska / Mariusz Siudek	2708	1999/2000 season (50%)	500	137	133	0	0
9	USA	Kyoko Ina / John Zimmerman	2577	2002/2003 season (100%)	0	0	0	0	0
9	USA	Kyoko Ina / John Zimmerman	2577	2001/2002 season (100%)	1100	308	239	0	0
9	USA	Kyoko Ina / John Zimmerman	2577	2000/2001 season (70%)	630	154	130	0	0
9	USA	Kyoko Ina / John Zimmerman	2577	1999/2000 season (50%)	450	147	103	0	0
10	CAN	Anabelle Langlois / Patrice Archetto	2558	2002/2003 season (100%)	1000	322	264	0	0
10	CAN	Anabelle Langlois / Patrice Archetto	2558	2001/2002 season (100%)	805	167	0	0	0
10	CAN	Anabelle Langlois / Patrice Archetto	2558	2000/2001 season (70%)	466	0	0	0	0
10	CAN	Anabelle Langlois / Patrice Archetto	2558	1999/2000 season (50%)	0	0	0	0	0
11	CHN	Dan Zhang / Hao Zhang	2282	2002/2003 season (100%)	950	200	193	0	0
11	CHN	Dan Zhang / Hao Zhang	2282	2001/2002 season (100%)	800	70	69	0	0
11	CHN	Dan Zhang / Hao Zhang	2282	2000/2001 season (70%)	336	48	48	0	0
11	CHN	Dan Zhang / Hao Zhang	2282	1999/2000 season (50%)	210	35	30	0	0
12	USA	Tiffany Scott / Philip Dulebohn	1929	2002/2003 season (100%)	800	66	66	0	0
12	USA	Tiffany Scott / Philip Dulebohn	1929	2001/2002 season (100%)	900	0	0	0	0
12	USA	Tiffany Scott / Philip Dulebohn	1929	2000/2001 season (70%)	490	39	0	25	0
12	USA	Tiffany Scott / Philip Dulebohn	1929	1999/2000 season (50%)	400	34	31	0	0
13	CAN	Jacinthe Larivière / Lenny Faustino	1898	2002/2003 season (100%)	600	198	54	0	0
13	CAN	Jacinthe Larivière / Lenny Faustino	1898	2001/2002 season (100%)	850	62	0	39	0
13	CAN	Jacinthe Larivière / Lenny Faustino	1898	2000/2001 season (70%)	0	39	33	0	0
13	CAN	Jacinthe Larivière / Lenny Faustino	1898	1999/2000 season (50%)	0	0	0	57	0
14	RUS	Julia Obertas / Alexei Sokolov	1632	2002/2003 season (100%)	850	234	218	18	0
14	RUS	Julia Obertas / Alexei Sokolov	1632	2001/2002 season (100%)	0	169	143	0	0
14	RUS	Julia Obertas / Alexei Sokolov	1632	2000/2001 season (70%)	0	0	0	0	0
14	RUS	Julia Obertas / Alexei Sokolov	1632	1999/2000 season (50%)	0	0	0	0	0
15	CZE	Kateřina Beránková / Otto Dlabola	1631	2002/2003 season (100%)	700	55	0	0	0
15	CZE	Kateřina Beránková / Otto Dlabola	1631	2001/2002 season (100%)	850	0	0	0	0
15	CZE	Kateřina Beránková / Otto Dlabola	1631	2000/2001 season (70%)	455	0	0	0	0
15	CZE	Kateřina Beránková / Otto Dlabola	1631	1999/2000 season (50%)	300	26	0	0	0
16	USA	Rena Inoue / John Baldwin, Jr.	1481	2002/2003 season (100%)	750	54	47	0	0
16	USA	Rena Inoue / John Baldwin, Jr.	1481	2001/2002 season (100%)	630	0	0	0	0
16	USA	Rena Inoue / John Baldwin, Jr.	1481	2000/2001 season (70%)	0	0	0	0	0
16	USA	Rena Inoue / John Baldwin, Jr.	1481	1999/2000 season (50%)	0	0	0	0	0
17	JPN	Yuko Kavaguti / Alexander Markuntsov	1459	2002/2003 season (100%)	630	64	55	0	0
17	JPN	Yuko Kavaguti / Alexander Markuntsov	1459	2001/2002 season (100%)	600	62	48	0	0
17	JPN	Yuko Kavaguti / Alexander Markuntsov	1459	2000/2001 season (70%)	417	48	36	0	0
17	JPN	Yuko Kavaguti / Alexander Markuntsov	1459	1999/2000 season (50%)	0	0	0	0	0
18	CHN	Yang Ding / Zongfei Ren	1339	2002/2003 season (100%)	460	103	69	0	0
18	CHN	Yang Ding / Zongfei Ren	1339	2001/2002 season (100%)	595	60	52	0	0
18	CHN	Yang Ding / Zongfei Ren	1339	2000/2001 season (70%)	266	42	42	0	0
18	CHN	Yang Ding / Zongfei Ren	1339	1999/2000 season (50%)	140	0	0	0	0

==== Ice dance (12 couples) ====
As of 29 March 2003

Rank	Nation	Couple	Points	Season	ISU Championships or Olympics	(Junior) Grand Prix and Final		Selected International Competition	
Rank	Nation	Couple	Points	Season	Best	Best	2nd Best	Best	2nd Best
1	RUS	Irina Lobacheva / Ilia Averbukh	3680	2002/2003 season (100%)	1150	461	397	0	0
1	RUS	Irina Lobacheva / Ilia Averbukh	3680	2001/2002 season (100%)	1200	0	0	0	0
1	RUS	Irina Lobacheva / Ilia Averbukh	3680	2000/2001 season (70%)	770	260	212	0	0
1	RUS	Irina Lobacheva / Ilia Averbukh	3680	1999/2000 season (50%)	525	160	118	0	0
2	CAN	Shae-Lynn Bourne / Victor Kraatz	3436	2002/2003 season (100%)	1200	0	0	0	0
2	CAN	Shae-Lynn Bourne / Victor Kraatz	3436	2001/2002 season (100%)	1150	392	367	0	0
2	CAN	Shae-Lynn Bourne / Victor Kraatz	3436	2000/2001 season (70%)	735	175	152	0	0
2	CAN	Shae-Lynn Bourne / Victor Kraatz	3436	1999/2000 season (50%)	0	142	97	0	0
3	FRA	Marina Anissina / Gwendal Peizerat	3325	2002/2003 season (100%)	0	0	0	0	0
3	FRA	Marina Anissina / Gwendal Peizerat	3325	2001/2002 season (100%)	1200	397	315	0	0
3	FRA	Marina Anissina / Gwendal Peizerat	3325	2000/2001 season (70%)	805	313	295	0	0
3	FRA	Marina Anissina / Gwendal Peizerat	3325	1999/2000 season (50%)	600	221	192	0	0
4	ISR	Galit Chait / Sergei Sakhnovski	3223	2002/2003 season (100%)	950	308	254	0	0
4	ISR	Galit Chait / Sergei Sakhnovski	3223	2001/2002 season (100%)	1100	326	259	0	0
4	ISR	Galit Chait / Sergei Sakhnovski	3223	2000/2001 season (70%)	665	231	160	0	0
4	ISR	Galit Chait / Sergei Sakhnovski	3223	1999/2000 season (50%)	500	37	32	26	0
5	BUL	Albena Denkova / Maxim Staviyski	3215	2002/2003 season (100%)	1100	305	265	0	0
5	BUL	Albena Denkova / Maxim Staviyski	3215	2001/2002 season (100%)	1000	265	158	68	0
5	BUL	Albena Denkova / Maxim Staviyski	3215	2000/2001 season (70%)	525	40	0	0	0
5	BUL	Albena Denkova / Maxim Staviyski	3215	1999/2000 season (50%)	0	95	32	32	22
6	ITA	Barbara Fusar-Poli / Maurizio Margaglio	3006	2002/2003 season (100%)	0	0	0	0	0
6	ITA	Barbara Fusar-Poli / Maurizio Margaglio	3006	2001/2002 season (100%)	1100	311	238	0	0
6	ITA	Barbara Fusar-Poli / Maurizio Margaglio	3006	2000/2001 season (70%)	840	263	254	0	0
6	ITA	Barbara Fusar-Poli / Maurizio Margaglio	3006	1999/2000 season (50%)	575	184	142	0	0
7	UKR	Elena Grushina / Ruslan Goncharov	2976	2002/2003 season (100%)	1000	344	328	0	0
7	UKR	Elena Grushina / Ruslan Goncharov	2976	2001/2002 season (100%)	950	207	66	0	0
7	UKR	Elena Grushina / Ruslan Goncharov	2976	2000/2001 season (70%)	595	147	139	0	0
7	UKR	Elena Grushina / Ruslan Goncharov	2976	1999/2000 season (50%)	450	111	96	0	0
8	RUS	Tatiana Navka / Roman Kostomarov	2874	2002/2003 season (100%)	1050	331	292	0	0
8	RUS	Tatiana Navka / Roman Kostomarov	2874	2001/2002 season (100%)	850	196	155	0	0
8	RUS	Tatiana Navka / Roman Kostomarov	2874	2000/2001 season (70%)	455	120	49	0	0
8	RUS	Tatiana Navka / Roman Kostomarov	2874	1999/2000 season (50%)	0	0	0	0	0
9	LTU	Margarita Drobiazko / Povilas Vanagas	2807	2002/2003 season (100%)	0	0	0	0	0
9	LTU	Margarita Drobiazko / Povilas Vanagas	2807	2001/2002 season (100%)	1050	331	261	0	0
9	LTU	Margarita Drobiazko / Povilas Vanagas	2807	2000/2001 season (70%)	700	246	219	0	0
9	LTU	Margarita Drobiazko / Povilas Vanagas	2807	1999/2000 season (50%)	550	147	133	0	0
10	GER	Kati Winkler / Rene Lohse	2593	2002/2003 season (100%)	700	384	203	0	0
10	GER	Kati Winkler / Rene Lohse	2593	2001/2002 season (100%)	900	0	0	0	0
10	GER	Kati Winkler / Rene Lohse	2593	2000/2001 season (70%)	630	209	197	0	0
10	GER	Kati Winkler / Rene Lohse	2593	1999/2000 season (50%)	475	118	71	0	0
11	CAN	Marie-France Dubreuil / Patrice Lauzon	2369	2002/2003 season (100%)	750	287	152	0	0
11	CAN	Marie-France Dubreuil / Patrice Lauzon	2369	2001/2002 season (100%)	750	199	198	0	0
11	CAN	Marie-France Dubreuil / Patrice Lauzon	2369	2000/2001 season (70%)	539	185	43	0	0
11	CAN	Marie-France Dubreuil / Patrice Lauzon	2369	1999/2000 season (50%)	403	66	20	0	0
12	USA	Tanith Belbin / Benjamin Agosto	2243	2002/2003 season (100%)	900	219	201	0	0
12	USA	Tanith Belbin / Benjamin Agosto	2243	2001/2002 season (100%)	805	65	53	0	0
12	USA	Tanith Belbin / Benjamin Agosto	2243	2000/2001 season (70%)	322	48	48	0	0
12	USA	Tanith Belbin / Benjamin Agosto	2243	1999/2000 season (50%)	220	35	30	0	0

== See also ==
- ISU World Standings
- 2002–03 figure skating season
