= 2005–06 ISU World Standings =

Rankings for skating and ice dance

Season-end No. 1 skaters
- Men's singles: (Canada) Jeffrey Buttle
- Ladies' singles: (Russia) Irina Slutskaya
- Pairs: (Russia) Maria Petrova / Alexei Tikhonov
- Ice dance: (Russia) Tatiana Navka / Roman Kostomarov

Navigation

The 2005–06 ISU World Standings are the World Standings published by the International Skating Union (ISU) during the 2005–06 season.

The 2005–06 ISU World Standings for single & pair skating and ice dance, are taking into account results of the 2003–04, 2004–05 and 2005–06 seasons.

== World Standings for single & pair skating and ice dance ==
=== Season-end standings ===
The remainder of this section is a list, by discipline, published by the ISU.

==== Men's singles (15 skaters) ====
As of 3 April 2006

Rank	Nation	Skater	Points	Season	ISU Championships or Olympics	(Junior) Grand Prix and Final		Selected International Competition	
Rank	Nation	Skater	Points	Season	Best	Best	2nd Best	Best	2nd Best
1	CAN	Jeffrey Buttle	4550	2005/2006 season (100%)	1100	750	400	0	0
1	CAN	Jeffrey Buttle	4550	2004/2005 season (100%)	1150	750	400	0	0
1	CAN	Jeffrey Buttle	4550	2003/2004 season (70%)	588	280	262	0	0
2	RUS	Evgeni Plushenko	4165	2005/2006 season (100%)	1200	400	0	0	0
2	RUS	Evgeni Plushenko	4165	2004/2005 season (100%)	840	800	400	0	0
2	RUS	Evgeni Plushenko	4165	2003/2004 season (70%)	840	525	280	0	0
3	CAN	Emanuel Sandhu	4110	2005/2006 season (100%)	1000	600	400	0	0
3	CAN	Emanuel Sandhu	4110	2004/2005 season (100%)	900	650	400	0	0
3	CAN	Emanuel Sandhu	4110	2003/2004 season (70%)	595	560	227	0	0
4	FRA	Brian Joubert	3825	2005/2006 season (100%)	1150	375	350	0	0
4	FRA	Brian Joubert	3825	2004/2005 season (100%)	950	600	400	0	0
4	FRA	Brian Joubert	3825	2003/2004 season (70%)	805	262	227	0	0
5	SUI	Stéphane Lambiel	3785	2005/2006 season (100%)	1200	800	375	0	0
5	SUI	Stéphane Lambiel	3785	2004/2005 season (100%)	1200	0	0	0	0
5	SUI	Stéphane Lambiel	3785	2003/2004 season (70%)	735	210	0	0	0
6	USA	Evan Lysacek	3670	2005/2006 season (100%)	1100	375	375	0	0
6	USA	Evan Lysacek	3670	2004/2005 season (100%)	1100	300	300	0	0
6	USA	Evan Lysacek	3670	2003/2004 season (70%)	539	420	175	0	0
7	USA	Johnny Weir	3520	2005/2006 season (100%)	1000	350	250	0	0
7	USA	Johnny Weir	3520	2004/2005 season (100%)	1050	400	400	0	0
7	USA	Johnny Weir	3520	2003/2004 season (70%)	700	0	0	70	0
8	CHN	Chengjiang Li	3382	2005/2006 season (100%)	800	225	0	0	0
8	CHN	Chengjiang Li	3382	2004/2005 season (100%)	1000	700	375	0	0
8	CHN	Chengjiang Li	3382	2003/2004 season (70%)	525	262	245	0	0
9	BEL	Kevin van der Perren	3230	2005/2006 season (100%)	800	325	300	100	0
9	BEL	Kevin van der Perren	3230	2004/2005 season (100%)	850	300	0	100	0
9	BEL	Kevin van der Perren	3230	2003/2004 season (70%)	385	455	262	0	0
10	JPN	Nobunari Oda	3190	2005/2006 season (100%)	1050	650	400	0	0
10	JPN	Nobunari Oda	3190	2004/2005 season (100%)	715	200	175	0	0
10	JPN	Nobunari Oda	3190	2003/2004 season (70%)	290	175	158	0	0
11	JPN	Daisuke Takahashi	3105	2005/2006 season (100%)	850	700	400	0	0
11	JPN	Daisuke Takahashi	3105	2004/2005 season (100%)	770	0	0	0	0
11	JPN	Daisuke Takahashi	3105	2003/2004 season (70%)	490	210	175	0	0
12	FRA	Frédéric Dambier	2910	2005/2006 season (100%)	735	300	225	0	0
12	FRA	Frédéric Dambier	2910	2004/2005 season (100%)	800	350	0	150	0
12	FRA	Frédéric Dambier	2910	2003/2004 season (70%)	560	245	158	105	0
13	GER	Stefan Lindemann	2860	2005/2006 season (100%)	455	325	0	150	0
13	GER	Stefan Lindemann	2860	2004/2005 season (100%)	770	350	275	150	0
13	GER	Stefan Lindemann	2860	2003/2004 season (70%)	770	0	0	70	0
14	USA	Michael Weiss	2670	2005/2006 season (100%)	560	275	0	0	0
14	USA	Michael Weiss	2670	2004/2005 season (100%)	0	350	325	0	0
14	USA	Michael Weiss	2670	2003/2004 season (70%)	665	490	280	0	0
15	CHN	Min Zhang	2600	2005/2006 season (100%)	750	300	225	0	0
15	CHN	Min Zhang	2600	2004/2005 season (100%)	560	350	325	0	0
15	CHN	Min Zhang	2600	2003/2004 season (70%)	630	245	0	0	0

==== Ladies' singles (15 skaters) ====
As of 3 April 2006

Rank	Nation	Skater	Points	Season	ISU Championships or Olympics	(Junior) Grand Prix and Final		Selected International Competition	
Rank	Nation	Skater	Points	Season	Best	Best	2nd Best	Best	2nd Best
1	RUS	Irina Slutskaya	4650	2005/2006 season (100%)	1100	750	400	0	0
1	RUS	Irina Slutskaya	4650	2004/2005 season (100%)	1200	800	400	0	0
1	RUS	Irina Slutskaya	4650	2003/2004 season (70%)	560	0	0	0	0
2	JPN	Shizuka Arakawa	4030	2005/2006 season (100%)	1200	350	350	0	0
2	JPN	Shizuka Arakawa	4030	2004/2005 season (100%)	800	750	400	0	0
2	JPN	Shizuka Arakawa	4030	2003/2004 season (70%)	840	490	262	0	0
3	JPN	Miki Ando	3780	2005/2006 season (100%)	500	650	375	0	0
3	JPN	Miki Ando	3780	2004/2005 season (100%)	950	650	375	0	0
3	JPN	Miki Ando	3780	2003/2004 season (70%)	735	420	175	0	0
4	RUS	Elena Sokolova	3775	2005/2006 season (100%)	1050	600	400	150	0
4	RUS	Elena Sokolova	3775	2004/2005 season (100%)	900	350	325	0	0
4	RUS	Elena Sokolova	3775	2003/2004 season (70%)	539	0	0	0	0
5	JPN	Fumie Suguri	3735	2005/2006 season (100%)	1150	375	225	0	0
5	JPN	Fumie Suguri	3735	2004/2005 season (100%)	1000	325	325	0	0
5	JPN	Fumie Suguri	3735	2003/2004 season (70%)	630	560	280	0	0
6	CAN	Joannie Rochette	3500	2005/2006 season (100%)	1000	375	325	0	0
6	CAN	Joannie Rochette	3500	2004/2005 season (100%)	700	700	400	0	0
6	CAN	Joannie Rochette	3500	2003/2004 season (70%)	595	227	0	0	0
7	USA	Sasha Cohen	3480	2005/2006 season (100%)	1150	375	0	0	0
7	USA	Sasha Cohen	3480	2004/2005 season (100%)	1150	0	0	0	0
7	USA	Sasha Cohen	3480	2003/2004 season (70%)	805	525	280	0	0
8	JPN	Mao Asada	3450	2005/2006 season (100%)	685	800	400	0	0
8	JPN	Mao Asada	3450	2004/2005 season (100%)	715	600	250	0	0
8	JPN	Mao Asada	3450	2003/2004 season (70%)	0	0	0	0	0
9	JPN	Yoshie Onda	3250	2005/2006 season (100%)	700	350	350	0	0
9	JPN	Yoshie Onda	3250	2004/2005 season (100%)	805	600	375	0	0
9	JPN	Yoshie Onda	3250	2003/2004 season (70%)	416	420	262	0	0
10	USA	Kimmie Meissner	3205	2005/2006 season (100%)	1200	300	300	0	0
10	USA	Kimmie Meissner	3205	2004/2005 season (100%)	625	500	225	0	0
10	USA	Kimmie Meissner	3205	2003/2004 season (70%)	479	280	175	0	0
11	ITA	Carolina Kostner	3112	2005/2006 season (100%)	800	275	250	0	0
11	ITA	Carolina Kostner	3112	2004/2005 season (100%)	1100	375	300	0	0
11	ITA	Carolina Kostner	3112	2003/2004 season (70%)	700	262	0	0	0
12	FIN	Susanna Pöykiö	3107	2005/2006 season (100%)	800	325	0	0	0
12	FIN	Susanna Pöykiö	3107	2004/2005 season (100%)	850	350	300	150	0
12	FIN	Susanna Pöykiö	3107	2003/2004 season (70%)	465	227	210	105	0
13	KOR	Yuna Kim	3050	2005/2006 season (100%)	715	600	250	0	0
13	KOR	Yuna Kim	3050	2004/2005 season (100%)	685	550	250	0	0
13	KOR	Yuna Kim	3050	2003/2004 season (70%)	0	0	0	0	0
14	HUN	Júlia Sebestyén	2980	2005/2006 season (100%)	385	275	225	150	0
14	HUN	Júlia Sebestyén	2980	2004/2005 season (100%)	735	350	350	0	0
14	HUN	Júlia Sebestyén	2980	2003/2004 season (70%)	665	385	245	70	0
15	JPN	Yukari Nakano	2906	2005/2006 season (100%)	1000	700	400	0	0
15	JPN	Yukari Nakano	2906	2004/2005 season (100%)	490	0	0	0	0
15	JPN	Yukari Nakano	2906	2003/2004 season (70%)	465	158	158	0	0

==== Pairs (15 couples) ====
As of 3 April 2006

Rank	Nation	Couple	Points	Season	ISU Championships or Olympics	(Junior) Grand Prix and Final		Selected International Competition	
Rank	Nation	Couple	Points	Season	Best	Best	2nd Best	Best	2nd Best
1	RUS	Maria Petrova / Alexei Tikhonov	4540	2005/2006 season (100%)	1100	650	400	0	0
1	RUS	Maria Petrova / Alexei Tikhonov	4540	2004/2005 season (100%)	1150	750	400	0	0
1	RUS	Maria Petrova / Alexei Tikhonov	4540	2003/2004 season (70%)	735	490	280	0	0
2	RUS	Tatiana Totmianina / Maxim Marinin	4405	2005/2006 season (100%)	1200	800	400	0	0
2	RUS	Tatiana Totmianina / Maxim Marinin	4405	2004/2005 season (100%)	1200	0	0	0	0
2	RUS	Tatiana Totmianina / Maxim Marinin	4405	2003/2004 season (70%)	840	525	280	0	0
3	CHN	Dan Zhang / Hao Zhang	4400	2005/2006 season (100%)	1150	750	400	0	0
3	CHN	Dan Zhang / Hao Zhang	4400	2004/2005 season (100%)	1100	600	400	0	0
3	CHN	Dan Zhang / Hao Zhang	4400	2003/2004 season (70%)	700	385	280	0	0
4	CHN	Qing Pang / Jian Tong	4295	2005/2006 season (100%)	1200	550	375	0	0
4	CHN	Qing Pang / Jian Tong	4295	2004/2005 season (100%)	1050	700	375	0	0
4	CHN	Qing Pang / Jian Tong	4295	2003/2004 season (70%)	770	420	280	0	0
5	CHN	Xue Shen / Hongbo Zhao	3945	2005/2006 season (100%)	1100	0	0	0	0
5	CHN	Xue Shen / Hongbo Zhao	3945	2004/2005 season (100%)	0	800	400	0	0
5	CHN	Xue Shen / Hongbo Zhao	3945	2003/2004 season (70%)	805	560	280	0	0
6	RUS	Julia Obertas / Sergei Slavnov	3850	2005/2006 season (100%)	850	600	375	0	0
6	RUS	Julia Obertas / Sergei Slavnov	3850	2004/2005 season (100%)	1000	650	375	0	0
6	RUS	Julia Obertas / Sergei Slavnov	3850	2003/2004 season (70%)	630	210	192	0	0
7	GER	Aliona Savchenko / Robin Szolkowy	3700	2005/2006 season (100%)	950	700	400	150	0
7	GER	Aliona Savchenko / Robin Szolkowy	3700	2004/2005 season (100%)	950	350	0	150	50
7	GER	Aliona Savchenko / Robin Szolkowy	3700	2003/2004 season (70%)	0	0	0	0	0
8	USA	Rena Inoue / John Baldwin	3350	2005/2006 season (100%)	1050	375	325	0	0
8	USA	Rena Inoue / John Baldwin	3350	2004/2005 season (100%)	700	550	350	0	0
8	USA	Rena Inoue / John Baldwin	3350	2003/2004 season (70%)	525	227	210	0	0
9	CAN	Valérie Marcoux / Craig Buntin	3150	2005/2006 season (100%)	1000	350	350	0	0
9	CAN	Valérie Marcoux / Craig Buntin	3150	2004/2005 season (100%)	800	350	300	0	0
9	CAN	Valérie Marcoux / Craig Buntin	3150	2003/2004 season (70%)	560	227	175	0	0
10	POL	Dorota Zagorska / Mariusz Siudek	3100	2005/2006 season (100%)	800	350	350	0	0
10	POL	Dorota Zagorska / Mariusz Siudek	3100	2004/2005 season (100%)	900	350	350	0	0
10	POL	Dorota Zagorska / Mariusz Siudek	3100	2003/2004 season (70%)	665	245	245	0	0
11	CAN	Utako Wakamatsu / Jean-Sebastien Fecteau	3017	2005/2006 season (100%)	805	350	275	0	0
11	CAN	Utako Wakamatsu / Jean-Sebastien Fecteau	3017	2004/2005 season (100%)	850	300	0	0	0
11	CAN	Utako Wakamatsu / Jean-Sebastien Fecteau	3017	2003/2004 season (70%)	0	227	210	105	105
12	RUS	Maria Mukhortova / Maxim Trankov	2915	2005/2006 season (100%)	650	325	250	0	0
12	RUS	Maria Mukhortova / Maxim Trankov	2915	2004/2005 season (100%)	715	600	275	0	0
12	RUS	Maria Mukhortova / Maxim Trankov	2915	2003/2004 season (70%)	458	350	175	0	0
13	CAN	Jessica Dube / Bryce Davison	2855	2005/2006 season (100%)	900	325	275	0	0
13	CAN	Jessica Dube / Bryce Davison	2855	2004/2005 season (100%)	685	250	225	0	0
13	CAN	Jessica Dube / Bryce Davison	2855	2003/2004 season (70%)	479	420	175	0	0
14	USA	Julia Vlassov / Drew Meekins	2665	2005/2006 season (100%)	715	550	225	0	0
14	USA	Julia Vlassov / Drew Meekins	2665	2004/2005 season (100%)	475	450	250	0	0
14	USA	Julia Vlassov / Drew Meekins	2665	2003/2004 season (70%)	0	0	0	0	0
15	CAN	Elizabeth Putnam / Sean Wirtz	2655	2005/2006 season (100%)	770	325	300	0	0
15	CAN	Elizabeth Putnam / Sean Wirtz	2655	2004/2005 season (100%)	735	300	225	0	0
15	CAN	Elizabeth Putnam / Sean Wirtz	2655	2003/2004 season (70%)	392	210	192	0	0

==== Ice dance (25 couples) ====
As of 3 April 2006

Rank	Nation	Couple	Points	Season	ISU Championships or Olympics	(Junior) Grand Prix and Final		Selected International Competition	
Rank	Nation	Couple	Points	Season	Best	Best	2nd Best	Best	2nd Best
1	RUS	Tatiana Navka / Roman Kostomarov	4960	2005/2006 season (100%)	1200	800	400	0	0
1	RUS	Tatiana Navka / Roman Kostomarov	4960	2004/2005 season (100%)	1200	800	400	0	0
1	RUS	Tatiana Navka / Roman Kostomarov	4960	2003/2004 season (70%)	840	560	280	0	0
2	USA	Tanith Belbin / Benjamin Agosto	4490	2005/2006 season (100%)	1150	400	0	150	0
2	USA	Tanith Belbin / Benjamin Agosto	4490	2004/2005 season (100%)	1150	750	400	0	0
2	USA	Tanith Belbin / Benjamin Agosto	4490	2003/2004 season (70%)	700	490	280	0	0
3	BUL	Albena Denkova / Maxim Staviski	4455	2005/2006 season (100%)	1200	375	0	0	0
3	BUL	Albena Denkova / Maxim Staviski	4455	2004/2005 season (100%)	1000	700	400	150	0
3	BUL	Albena Denkova / Maxim Staviski	4455	2003/2004 season (70%)	805	525	280	105	0
4	UKR	Elena Grushina / Ruslan Goncharov	4180	2005/2006 season (100%)	1100	750	400	0	0
4	UKR	Elena Grushina / Ruslan Goncharov	4180	2004/2005 season (100%)	1100	375	0	0	0
4	UKR	Elena Grushina / Ruslan Goncharov	4180	2003/2004 season (70%)	735	455	262	0	0
5	CAN	Marie-France Dubreuil / Patrice Lauzon	4135	2005/2006 season (100%)	1150	700	400	0	0
5	CAN	Marie-France Dubreuil / Patrice Lauzon	4135	2004/2005 season (100%)	900	600	375	0	0
5	CAN	Marie-France Dubreuil / Patrice Lauzon	4135	2003/2004 season (70%)	595	385	262	0	0
6	FRA	Isabelle Delobel / Olivier Schoenfelder	4095	2005/2006 season (100%)	1050	550	375	0	0
6	FRA	Isabelle Delobel / Olivier Schoenfelder	4095	2004/2005 season (100%)	1050	550	350	100	0
6	FRA	Isabelle Delobel / Olivier Schoenfelder	4095	2003/2004 season (70%)	665	420	245	0	0
7	ISR	Galit Chait / Sergei Sakhnovski	3950	2005/2006 season (100%)	950	650	375	0	0
7	ISR	Galit Chait / Sergei Sakhnovski	3950	2004/2005 season (100%)	950	650	375	0	0
7	ISR	Galit Chait / Sergei Sakhnovski	3950	2003/2004 season (70%)	630	245	245	0	0
8	RUS	Oksana Domnina / Maxim Shabalin	3420	2005/2006 season (100%)	900	600	350	0	0
8	RUS	Oksana Domnina / Maxim Shabalin	3420	2004/2005 season (100%)	850	325	325	0	0
8	RUS	Oksana Domnina / Maxim Shabalin	3420	2003/2004 season (70%)	525	192	192	70	0
9	CAN	Tessa Virtue / Scott Moir	3105	2005/2006 season (100%)	770	600	250	0	0
9	CAN	Tessa Virtue / Scott Moir	3105	2004/2005 season (100%)	685	550	250	0	0
9	CAN	Tessa Virtue / Scott Moir	3105	2003/2004 season (70%)	290	122	88	0	0
10	USA	Morgan Matthews / Maxim Zavozin	3095	2005/2006 season (100%)	805	325	300	0	0
10	USA	Morgan Matthews / Maxim Zavozin	3095	2004/2005 season (100%)	715	600	250	0	0
10	USA	Morgan Matthews / Maxim Zavozin	3095	2003/2004 season (70%)	458	350	175	0	0
11	USA	Melissa Gregory / Denis Petukhov	2930	2005/2006 season (100%)	800	350	325	0	0
11	USA	Melissa Gregory / Denis Petukhov	2930	2004/2005 season (100%)	805	325	325	0	0
11	USA	Melissa Gregory / Denis Petukhov	2930	2003/2004 season (70%)	514	227	210	0	0
12	ITA	Federica Faiella / Massimo Scali	2925	2005/2006 season (100%)	850	350	275	0	0
12	ITA	Federica Faiella / Massimo Scali	2925	2004/2005 season (100%)	800	350	300	0	0
12	ITA	Federica Faiella / Massimo Scali	2925	2003/2004 season (70%)	560	227	210	0	0
13	CAN	Megan Wing / Aaron Lowe	2825	2005/2006 season (100%)	750	350	325	0	0
13	CAN	Megan Wing / Aaron Lowe	2825	2004/2005 season (100%)	750	350	300	0	0
13	CAN	Megan Wing / Aaron Lowe	2825	2003/2004 season (70%)	539	210	210	0	0
14	RUS	Natalia Mikhailova / Arkadi Sergeev	2745	2005/2006 season (100%)	685	450	250	0	0
14	RUS	Natalia Mikhailova / Arkadi Sergeev	2745	2004/2005 season (100%)	595	450	250	0	0
14	RUS	Natalia Mikhailova / Arkadi Sergeev	2745	2003/2004 season (70%)	438	315	175	0	0
15	HUN	Nora Hoffmann / Attila Elek	2304	2005/2006 season (100%)	455	250	0	0	0
15	HUN	Nora Hoffmann / Attila Elek	2304	2004/2005 season (100%)	525	275	250	0	0
15	HUN	Nora Hoffmann / Attila Elek	2304	2003/2004 season (70%)	479	420	175	105	0
16	AZE	Kristin Fraser / Igor Lukanin	2485	2005/2006 season (100%)	560	325	325	100	0
16	AZE	Kristin Fraser / Igor Lukanin	2485	2004/2005 season (100%)	600	300	275	0	0
16	AZE	Kristin Fraser / Igor Lukanin	2485	2003/2004 season (70%)	315	175	175	0	0
17	RUS	Anastasia Gorshkova / Ilia Tkachenko	2465	2005/2006 season (100%)	535	400	250	0	0
17	RUS	Anastasia Gorshkova / Ilia Tkachenko	2465	2004/2005 season (100%)	655	400	225	0	0
17	RUS	Anastasia Gorshkova / Ilia Tkachenko	2465	2003/2004 season (70%)	0	0	0	0	0
18	GBR	Sinead Kerr / John Kerr	2320	2005/2006 season (100%)	750	250	0	0	0
18	GBR	Sinead Kerr / John Kerr	2320	2004/2005 season (100%)	650	300	300	0	0
18	GBR	Sinead Kerr / John Kerr	2320	2003/2004 season (70%)	385	0	0	70	0
19	JPN	Nozomi Watanabe / Akiyuki Kido	2210	2005/2006 season (100%)	500	300	225	0	0
19	JPN	Nozomi Watanabe / Akiyuki Kido	2210	2004/2005 season (100%)	735	225	225	0	0
19	JPN	Nozomi Watanabe / Akiyuki Kido	2210	2003/2004 season (70%)	490	158	158	0	0
20	FRA	Nathalie Pechalat / Fabian Bourzat	2030	2005/2006 season (100%)	500	300	300	0	0
20	FRA	Nathalie Pechalat / Fabian Bourzat	2030	2004/2005 season (100%)	455	250	225	0	0
20	FRA	Nathalie Pechalat / Fabian Bourzat	2030	2003/2004 season (70%)	175	175	158	0	0
21	GER	Christina Beier / William Beier	1983	2005/2006 season (100%)	600	275	250	50	50
21	GER	Christina Beier / William Beier	1983	2004/2005 season (100%)	350	250	0	0	0
21	GER	Christina Beier / William Beier	1983	2003/2004 season (70%)	220	158	0	0	0
22	USA	Meryl Davis / Charlie White	1888	2005/2006 season (100%)	440	550	250	0	0
22	USA	Meryl Davis / Charlie White	1888	2004/2005 season (100%)	0	200	200	0	0
22	USA	Meryl Davis / Charlie White	1888	2003/2004 season (70%)	248	122	122	0	0
23	RUS	Jana Khokhlova / Sergei Novitski	1880	2005/2006 season (100%)	650	325	275	0	0
23	RUS	Jana Khokhlova / Sergei Novitski	1880	2004/2005 season (100%)	0	275	250	0	0
23	RUS	Jana Khokhlova / Sergei Novitski	1880	2003/2004 season (70%)	0	192	0	70	35
24	ISR	Alexandra Zaretski / Roman Zaretski	1870	2005/2006 season (100%)	350	0	0	0	0
24	ISR	Alexandra Zaretski / Roman Zaretski	1870	2004/2005 season (100%)	625	250	225	0	0
24	ISR	Alexandra Zaretski / Roman Zaretski	1870	2003/2004 season (70%)	332	245	175	0	0
25	RUS	Anastasia Platonova / Andrei Maximishin	1765	2005/2006 season (100%)	0	350	250	0	0
25	RUS	Anastasia Platonova / Andrei Maximishin	1765	2004/2005 season (100%)	565	350	250	0	0
25	RUS	Anastasia Platonova / Andrei Maximishin	1765	2003/2004 season (70%)	0	140	70	0	0

== See also ==
- ISU World Standings
- 2005–06 figure skating season
