= Geri Lynch Tomich =

American figure skating coach

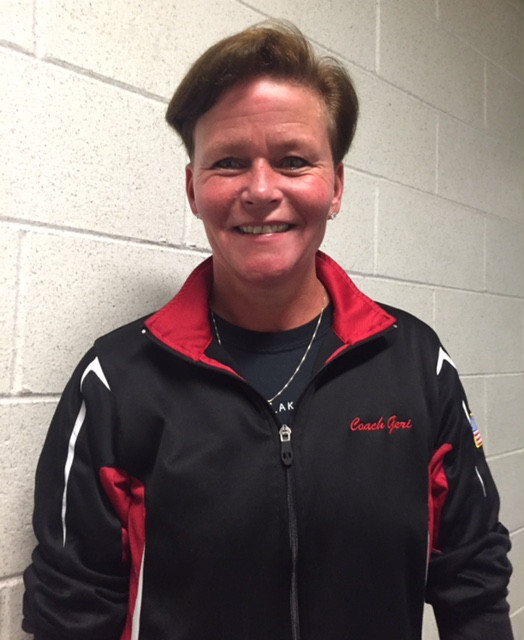
Tomich in 2016

Geri Lynch Tomich (born 15 July 1964, Manhattan, New York) is an American synchronized figure skating coach and former figure skater.

== Education ==
She holds a Bachelor of Arts degree from Queens College, City University of New York.

== Professional career ==
Tomich, once a member of the Disney on Ice show, was invited by the Essex Skating Club in 2001 to start and lead its synchronized skating organization.

Tomich is the founder and the head coach of the Synchroettes synchronized skating teams, a not for profit organization that spans 10 teams and includes about 200 figure skaters. Synchroettes is one of the biggest such organizations in the United States and no longer represents the Essex Skating Club of New Jersey.

The first practice of the newly formed Synchroettes was scheduled on September 11, 2001, the day when terrorists attacked the World Trade Center in New York City, killing nearly 3,000 people. In order to honor the 9/11 victims Synchroettes has added the U.S. flag to all team attires.

She led her Synchroettes juvenile team to win gold medals at the U.S. National competition in 2010, pewter medals in 2012 and 2015. Her Synchroettes junior team won the U.S. East Coast Champions title in 2015, 2014 and 2013. Synchroettes preliminary team won the U.S. East Coast championship in 2016 and 2010.

In 2016, she debuted the Synchroettes Unified Team that gives an opportunity for kids with disabilities such as autism spectrum disorders to skate on the same team with competitive skaters. According to a number of recent scientific studies, therapeutic ice skating in kids with autism spectrum disorders was found to improve balance, motor skills, overall functional capacity as well as emotional health.)

New Jersey Governor Chris Christie came in September 2012 to see Synchroettes junior team practice as the sport has rapidly expanded throughout the country. He met Tomich and the skaters after the practice.

In recognition of Synchroettes' success in the national competitions, the U.S. Figure Skating Association selected its junior team as the Junior Team USA for three seasons in a row, including in 2012–2013, 2013–2014 and 2014–2015. As the Junior Team USA, the Synchroettes went to earn silver medals in 2014 and bronze medals in 2013 at the highly regarded Leon Lurje Trophy international competition in Sweden.

Due to the national and international achievements of the Synchroettes teams Dec. 18 is Synchroettes Day in Essex county, New Jersey, where their home rink is located.

Synchroettes practice at the Richard J. Codey Arena in West Orange, New Jersey. The rink is in the heart of the South Mountain Recreation Complex.

== Awards ==
USFSA Gold Medalist in Freestyle, USFSA Gold Medalist in Figures. Two years on the US Tour of "Disney On Ice". US Easterns Senior Ladies Championship. Member USFSA, ISI, PSA.

== Charity ==
Tomich leads the Synchroettes teams in their consistent support of Walk for Wishes annual march. Another annual charity event led by Coach is an annual performance by the Synchroettes Teams aimed at supporting U.S. Marine Corps' Toys for Tots initiative designed to give a holiday gift to poor children. The performance, in which all of the teams participate, is normally held in mid-December at the Teams's home rink in West Orange, New Jersey.

== Children ==
- Kaleigh Corbett, a coach at the Synchroettes and Bible scholar.
- Ashley Tomich. Ashley is U.S. National Champion (2014, 2015, 2016, 2017) and World Bronze Medalist (2016) as a member of the Boston-based Haydenettes Senior synchronized figure skating team
- Matt Corbett – son-in-law
