= Synchroettes =

American synchronized skating teams

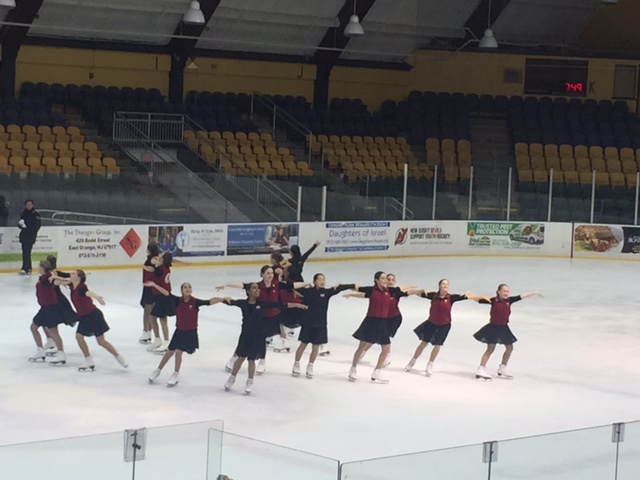
Synchroettes in 2016

Synchroettes are synchronized skating teams, formed by head coach Geri Lynch Tomich in 2001. They represent the Essex Skating Club of New Jersey, United States. The Synchroettes skaters are from around the world, including China, Russia, Ukraine, Great Britain, Uruguay and Colombia in the season of 2016–2017. However, the teams are composed primarily of skaters from the New York City and New Jersey.

== Teams ==
In the season of 2016-2017, most of the Synchroettes teams have 16 members. In addition to that, each of the teams has up to four reserve skaters who practice with their teams and perform at competitions in case main skaters become injured or unavailable to skate due to any other reason. Reserves skaters are called “spot sharers” in the sport.

The Synchroettes teams of the season 2016–2017 include teams of the following levels:

- Junior (Skaters are at least 13 years old and under 19, they all have passed at least the Intermediate Moves in the Field test)
- Novice (Most of the team members are under 16 and have passed at least the Juvenile Moves in the Field test, this is a cross-skater team)
- Intermediate (Skaters are under 18 and all of them have passed the Pre-Juvenile Moves in the Field test, the team was cut as of the 2017–18 season)
- Juvenile (skaters are under 13, all of the team's members have passed the Preliminary Moves in the Field test, however, to skate at competitions, skaters must have passed the pre-juvenile moves in the field test, abbreviation “Juv”)
- Pre-juvenile (the majority of the team are under 12 years old, abbreviation “Pre-Juv”)
- Preliminary (skaters are under 12 years old, with the majority of the team under 10, abbreviation “Prelim”)
- Beginner-1, Beginner-2 are the two teams for young skaters, who have not yet passes any USFSA ice skating tests.

In the season of 2016–2017 the Synchroetts debuted the Unified team, giving an opportunity for kids and adults with special needs to skate on the same team with competitive skaters.

The Synchroettes teams won in many regional competitions and competed in national competitions for many years. They also performed in many public appearances and participated in community service skating events such as Toys for Tots and a show to benefit Susan G. Komen for the Cure. The success of the Essex Skating Club's synchronized skating teams was recognized by the U.S. Figure Skating in its publication, Guide to Basic Skills and Beginner Synchronized Skating, as one of the two featured clubs to inspire skating clubs around the U.S. to start a basic skills/beginner synchronized skating program.

All of the Synchroettes teams typically hold their tryout sessions in spring for skaters ages five to eighteen seeking to join the teams for the next season. The skates are strongly encouraged to practice several times a week on ice and off ice, including instructions with private coaches. Members of the teams competing on the national level are expected to demonstrate advanced figure skating skills and pass special tests approved by the U.S. Figure Skating Association, such as a set of tests called Moves in the Field, ice dance and freestyle ice skating tests.

The Synchroettes’ home rink is Codey Arena in West Orange, New Jersey, the teams also practice at Clary Andresen Arena in Montclair, New Jersey.

== Head coach ==
Geri Lynch Tomich is the founder and the head coach of the Synchroettes synchronized skating teams, a not-for-profit organization that spans 10 teams and includes about 200 figure skaters. USFSA Gold Medalist in Freestyle ice skating, USFSA Gold Medalist in Figures skating. She is a member of USFSA, Ice Skating Institute, or ISI, and Professional Skaters Association, or PSA.

== Coaches ==
- Kaleigh Corbett works with the Synchroettes teams competing at the national and international levels, including Junior, Intermediate, Novice and Juvenile. She is also a pastor at the Frankford Plains United Methodist Church in Augusta, NJ, and writes for her blog. Coach Corbett is a member of USFSA, Ice Skating Institute, or ISI and Professional Skaters Association, which is known as PSA
- Bobette Guerrieri has been skating at Codey Arena, the Synchroettes home rink, since it first opened in 1958. She has been working as an ice skating coach since 1970 and with the Sycnhroettes – since 2003. Coach Guerrieri holds USFSA Gold Dance Level and teaches power skating.
- Randi Kaufmann, who has been teaching ice skating since 1990, works mostly with Pre-Juvenile and Open Juvenile at the Synchroettes. She holds a Bachelor of Arts degree from the State University of New York in Binghamton and master's degree in Social Work from the Rutgers University. She is a member of USFSA, ISI and PSA.

The Synchroettes coaches Tomich, Corbett and Guerrieri were recognized by the U.S. Professional Skaters Association among best coaches in the nation and included in the Honor Roll of Synchro Coaches in 2012 and 2013.

== Competitive results ==
In 2010, Synchroettes received their first gold medal at the U.S. Synchronized Skating Championships during the Juvenile division competition in Minneapolis, Minnesota.

The U.S. Figure Skating Association chose the Synchroettes Junior team to represent the country at the international competitions during the seasons of 2012–2013, 2013–2014, and 2014–2015, recognizing it as one of the most successful synchronized skating teams in the U.S. at that time. In their first year representing Team USA during the 2012–13 synchronized skating season, Synchroettes won the bronze medal at the Leon Lurje Trophy in Gothenburg, Sweden following behind two Swedish teams. This was also a significant milestone for the Team USA because historically, the team from Scandinavian counties dominated the international competitions. As a Junior Team USA, the Synchroettes went to earn silver medals in 2014 at the Leon Lurje Trophy.

In 2015, Synchroettes represented Team USA in the Junior division alongside Haydenettes in the Senior division at the 2015 Spring Cup, an international competition in Sesto San Giovanni, Italy. The team was ranked 6th in the competition.

International Skating Union published its ISU World Standings and Season's World Ranking and ranked Synchroettes Junior team in the 2015–16 ISU World Standings and the 2016–17 ISU World Standings at 48 and 57 respectively.

== Charity ==
The Synchroettes regularly support charity organizations. The teams hold an annual performance to support Toys for Tots, an initiative designed to give a holiday gift to poor children hosted by the U.S. Marine Corps. The Synchroettes also support Walk for Wishes, a family-friendly nationwide fundraising event organized by the Make-A-Wish Foundation.
