= Turtle Back Zoo =

Zoo in West Orange, New Jersey, United States

- Turtle Back Zoo logo

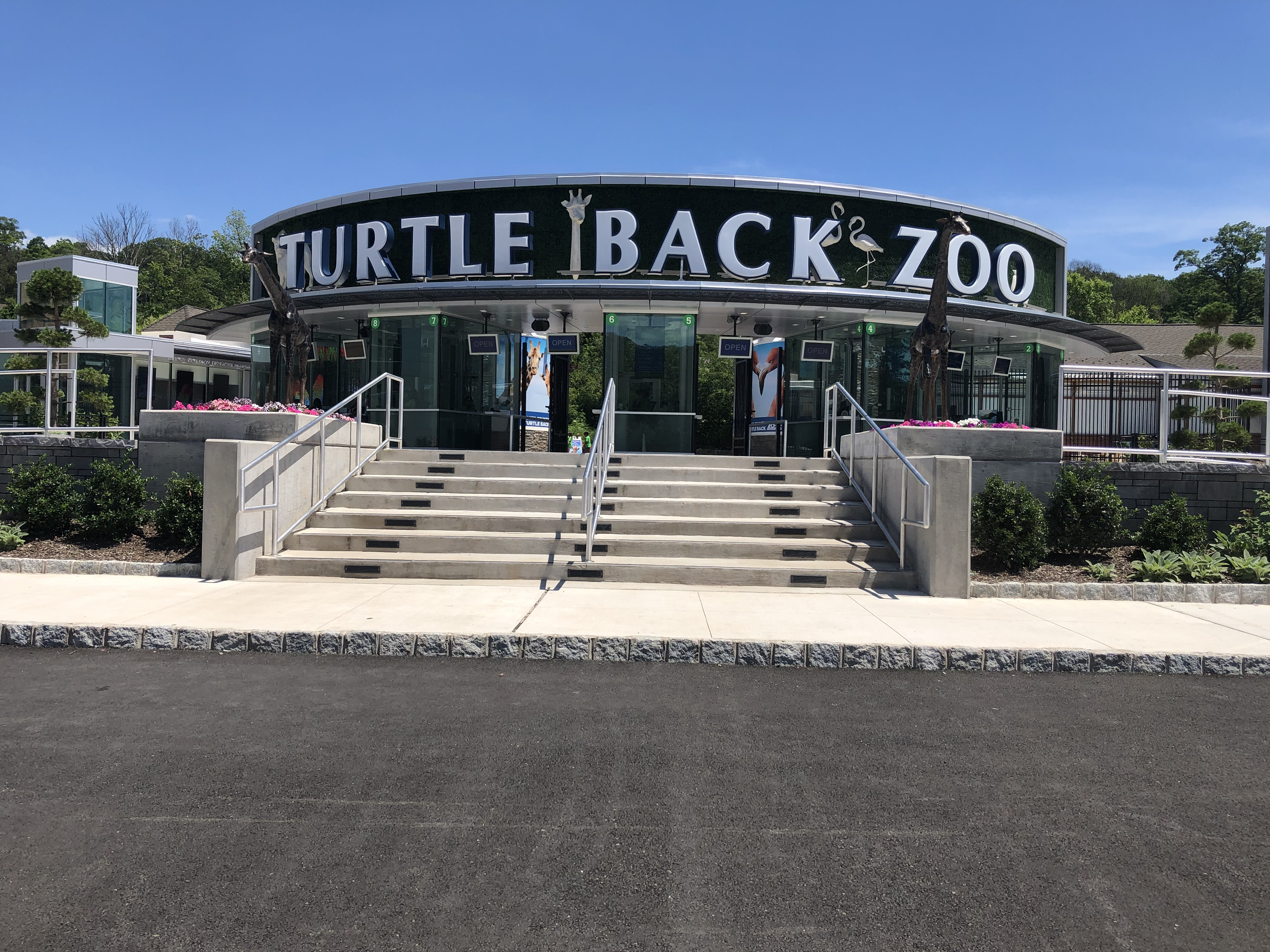
- The current entrance to the Turtle Back Zoo, opened in 2019.
- Interactive map of Turtle Back Zoo
- 40°46′3″N 74°16′55″W
- Date opened: 1963; 63 years ago
- Location: West Orange, New Jersey, United States
- No. of animals: Approximately 1,400
- Annual visitors: 979,056
- Memberships: AZA
- Major exhibits: African Adventure, Amazing Asia, Big Cat Country, Essex Farm, Island Giants, Reptile Center, Sea Lion Sound, Sea Turtle Recovery, Shores of Africa, Touch Tank
- Website: www.turtlebackzoo.com

Turtle Back Zoo is a zoo in West Orange, New Jersey. Situated on 20 acres (8.1 ha) in the South Mountain Reservation, it is part of the South Mountain Recreation Complex, which is managed as part of the Essex County Park System, the oldest county park system in the United States. Founded in 1963, the zoo was originally a showcase for animals indigenous to the New York metropolitan area but currently features species from every continent except Antarctica. As of 2018, it houses approximately 1400 animals, including several hundred birds in a free-flight aviary. Located adjacent to the Richard J. Codey Arena, the former practice home of the New Jersey Devils, the zoo is open year-round, weather permitting.

The Turtle Back Zoo has been an accredited member of the Association of Zoos and Aquariums (AZA) since 2006. In 2017, the zoo became an accredited member of ZAA (Zoological Association of America).

== History ==
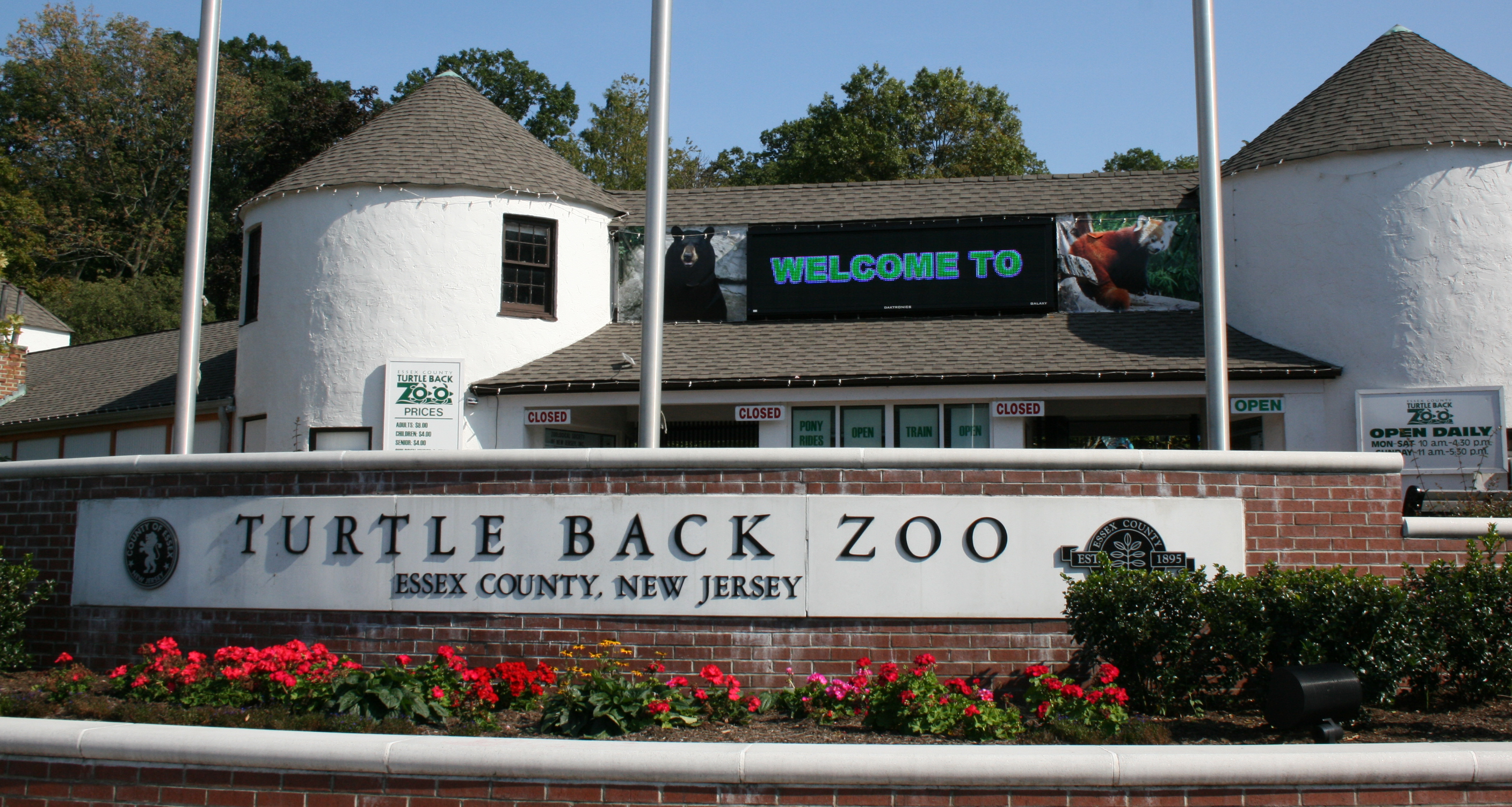
Old entrance to the Turtle Back Zoo, renovated in 2018.

Turtle Back Zoo, which took its name from a nearby rock formation, opened in 1963 with a collection of 140 animals representing 40 species. It was originally opened seasonally and had a Hans Christian Andersen "storybook theme," with such exhibits as "a giant piggy bank, the ABC house, [and] the pirates’ ship". By 1973 the zoo was home to 850 animals representing 275 species.

In 1975, the Zoological Society of New Jersey was established to help promote the zoo and provide funding. Despite this, Turtle Back Zoo fell into disrepair, and was almost shut down in 1995.

In 2000, the zoo created a master plan to improve the zoo enough to receive accreditation from the Association of Zoos and Aquariums (AZA). Between 2003 and 2006, Turtle Back received approximately $20 million in funding, which was used to improve the facilities, and in 2006 the zoo received its first accreditation. New facilities included the Essex County Animal Hospital on zoo grounds, and a new 11,000-square-foot (1,000 m^{2}) entrance/administrative complex with a 4,000-square-foot (370 m^{2}) reptile center, classrooms, and an auditorium.

In 2023, zoo attendance reached almost a million visitors for the first time in its history.

=== Expansion controversy ===
Residents of Essex County have lobbied for expansion of the zoo to cease, citing traffic congestion and disruption of the surrounding South Mountain Reservation. In July 2019, Essex County officials announced the construction of a proposed amphitheater, grizzly bear exhibit, and overnight camping. Essex County officials reported in September 2019 that as a result of the backlash, the amphitheater was scaled back, though no exact details were released. Due to the COVID-19 pandemic, the amphitheater was put on hold in 2020.

== Exhibits ==
Exhibits include an American black bear exhibit; the Essex Farm, which holds common farm animals and includes a petting zoo; and the African Adventure's first enclosure which exhibits Masai giraffes, ostriches, and bongos.

=== Reptile center ===
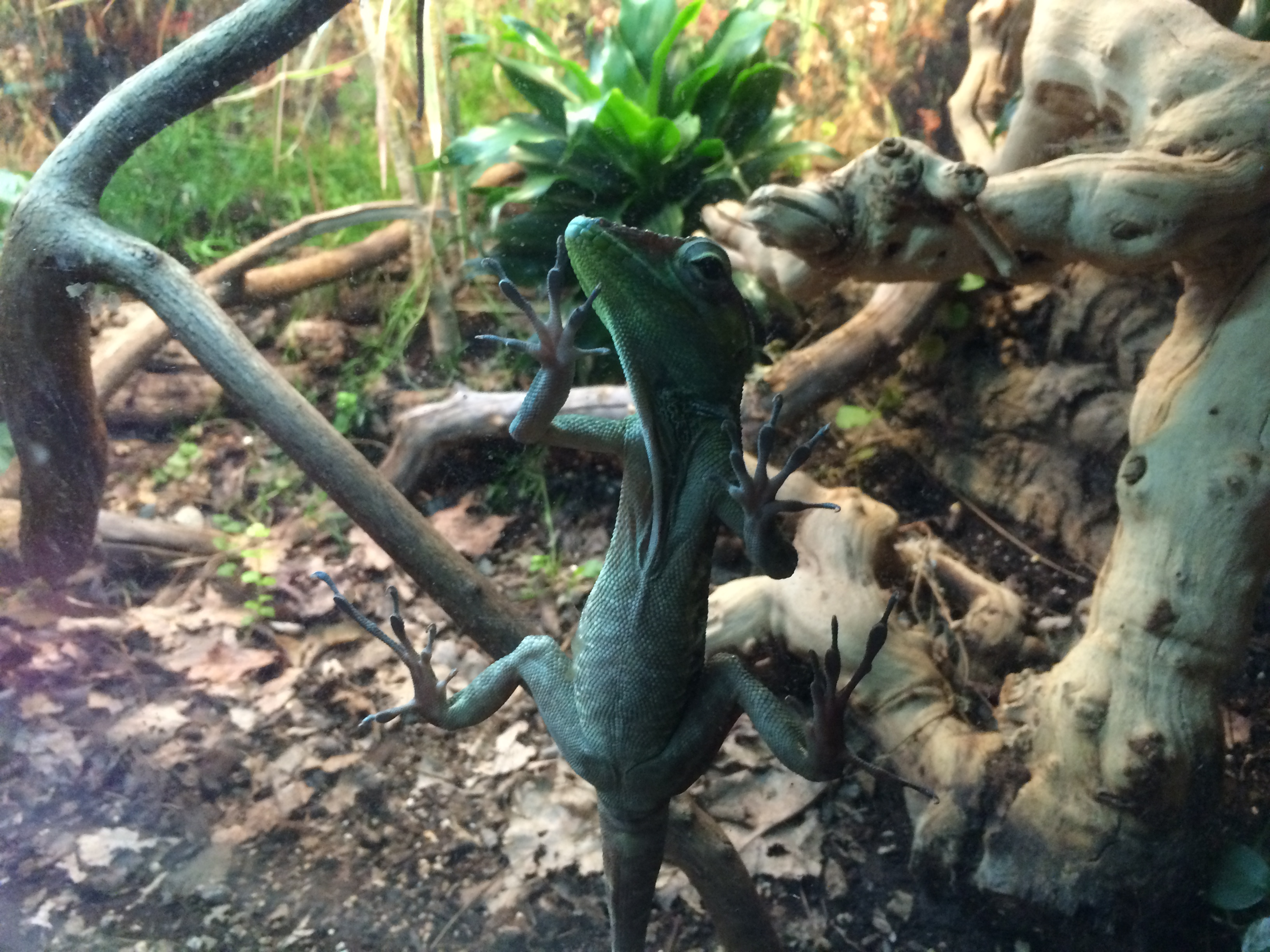
Exhibit at the Reptile Center.

The $4.6 million reptile house and education center, the zoo's first indoor exhibit, opened in June 2006. When the 4,000-square-foot (370 m^{2}) reptile center opened, it contained a pair of nine-foot-long "black dragons", a species of monitor lizard which was discovered in Malaysia in 2005 and has yet to receive a scientific name. The Reptile House contains amphibians like the Eastern hellbender and also the Lake Titicaca frog, some birds, and other reptiles including the caiman lizard, the Reticulated python, and a rare African dwarf crocodile.

=== Island Giants ===
Island Giants is a new sub-attractional exhibit which opened in September 2023. It is the new home for the Komodo dragon and American alligator, the former which was previously housed inside the Reptile Center. Three Malayan gharials, which also previously lived at the Reptile Center, are located in an indoor exhibit located next to the American alligator.

=== Amazing Asia ===
This regional exhibit is home to white-cheeked gibbons, red pandas, clouded leopards, a pygmy slow loris, knobbed hornbill and an amur and snow leopard exhibit. The gibbon habitat, a $1.8 million exhibit that opened in 2009 as the first exhibit for Amazing Asia, contains an 11,000-square-foot (1,000 m^{2}) outdoor mesh tent habitat that is home to the zoo's five white-cheeked gibbons, recently, the zoo reopened its gibbon exhibit after it was being renovated. The leopard exhibit is one of the latest exhibits, opening in 2018. After Amazing Asia was renovated in September 2022, the exhibit allowed the zoo's red pandas and clouded leopards to have more room to roam.

=== African Adventure ===
In May 2016, the zoo opened their three-acre African Adventure attraction. The $7 million addition is designed to mimic an African Savannah and contains a herd of 5 Masai giraffes. In addition, the exhibit contains zebras (upcoming), ostriches, and the endangered bongo antelope. As of spring 2017, this ancient exhibit includes lions and a pack of spotted hyenas.

==== Shores of Africa ====
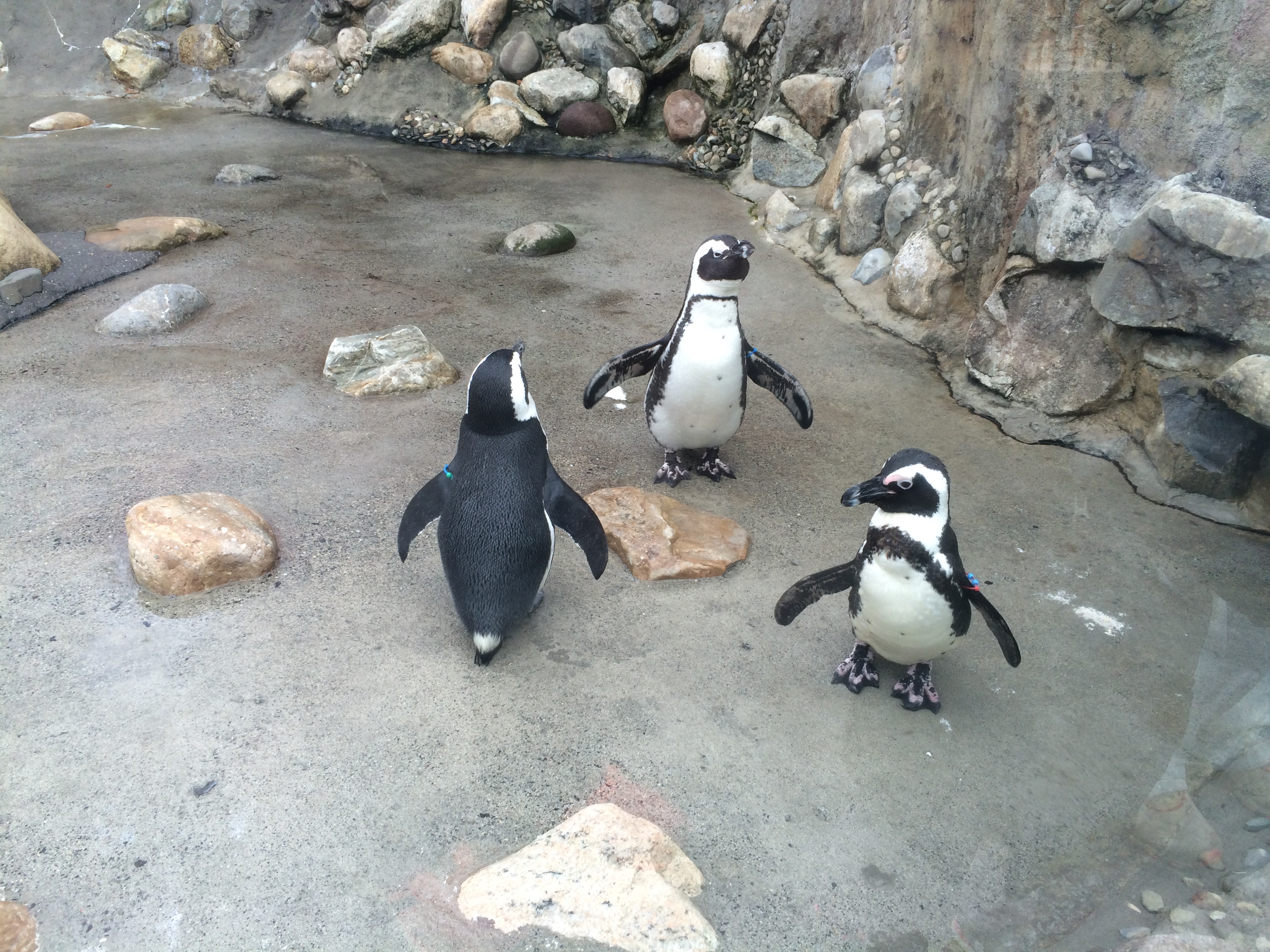
Penguins inside the Shores of Africa penguin house.

Shores of Africa forms part of the African Adventure and features an enclosure that is home to Pink-backed pelicans and the zoo's African penguins that swim in an indoor pool. Guests are able to experience underwater viewing while watching the penguins. It also features a small nocturnal exhibit that contains a Lesser bushbaby.

=== Stingray Touch Tank ===
This popular exhibit features a 1,600-gallon touch tank for Cownose rays and epaulette sharks. It also features an Indo-pacific reef tank home to coral and various tropical fish and invertebrates, along with a space for education programs and special events. This $5.5 million exhibit was opened in 2013, along with a former sea lion pool.

=== Big Cat Country ===
The exhibit features cougars and jaguars and has a Southwest United States theme. The animals’ area has rock outcroppings, a waterfall and indigenous Southwest plantings. Viewing areas resemble a southwest mine or cave and stamped concrete pathways for visitors resemble a southwest trail. The big cat area has an indoor winter refuge area for the animals and secure holding areas. It also is being used as a breeding facility. This $3 million exhibit was opened in 2011.

=== Drill Family Flamingo exhibit ===
In the summer of 2018, the zoo opened a new exhibit for the American and Chilean flamingo mixed flock. The current flamingo habitat was the zoo's old penguin exhibit, which got demolished and replaced by a home for new tropical birds.

== Other attractions ==
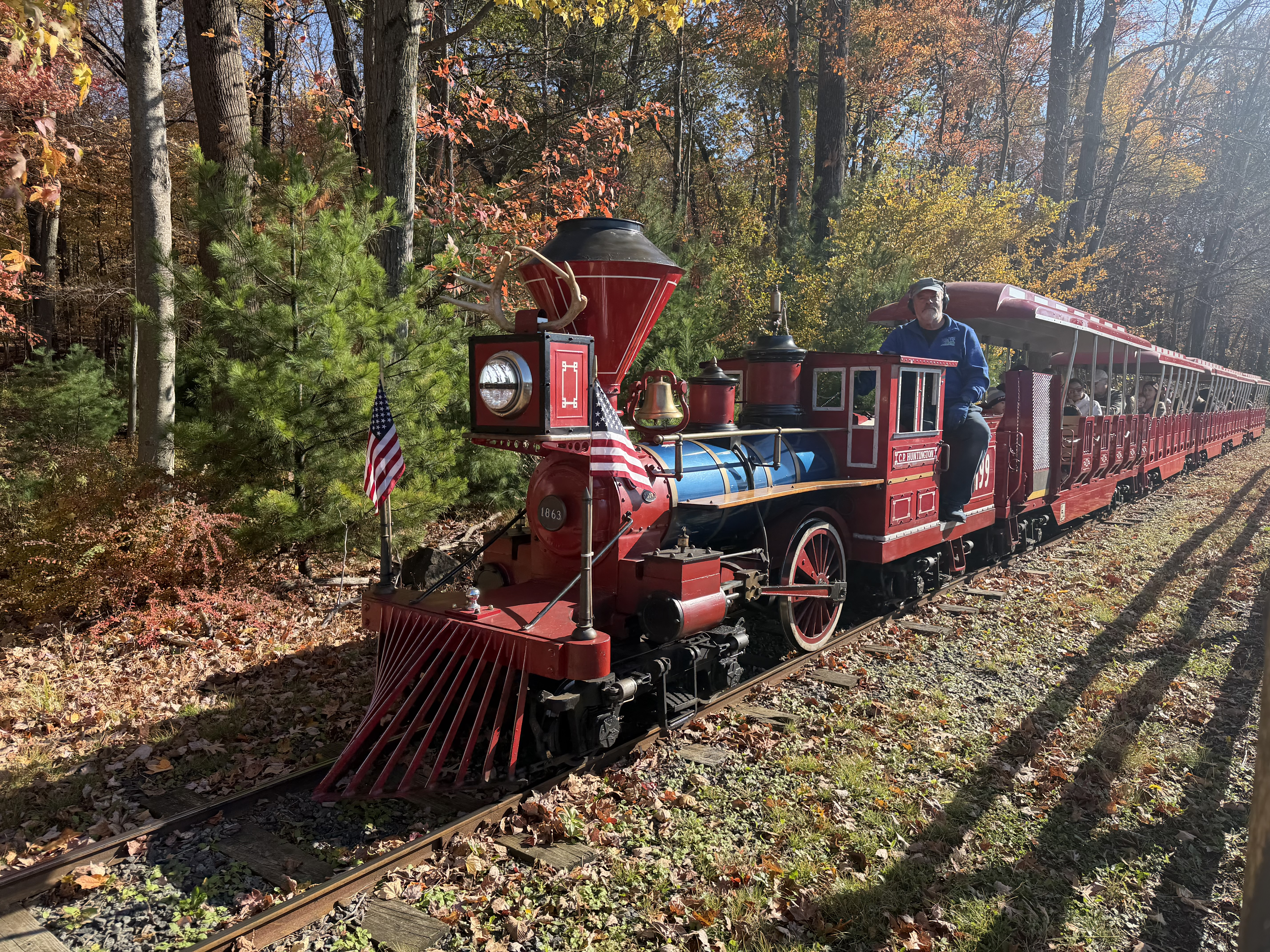
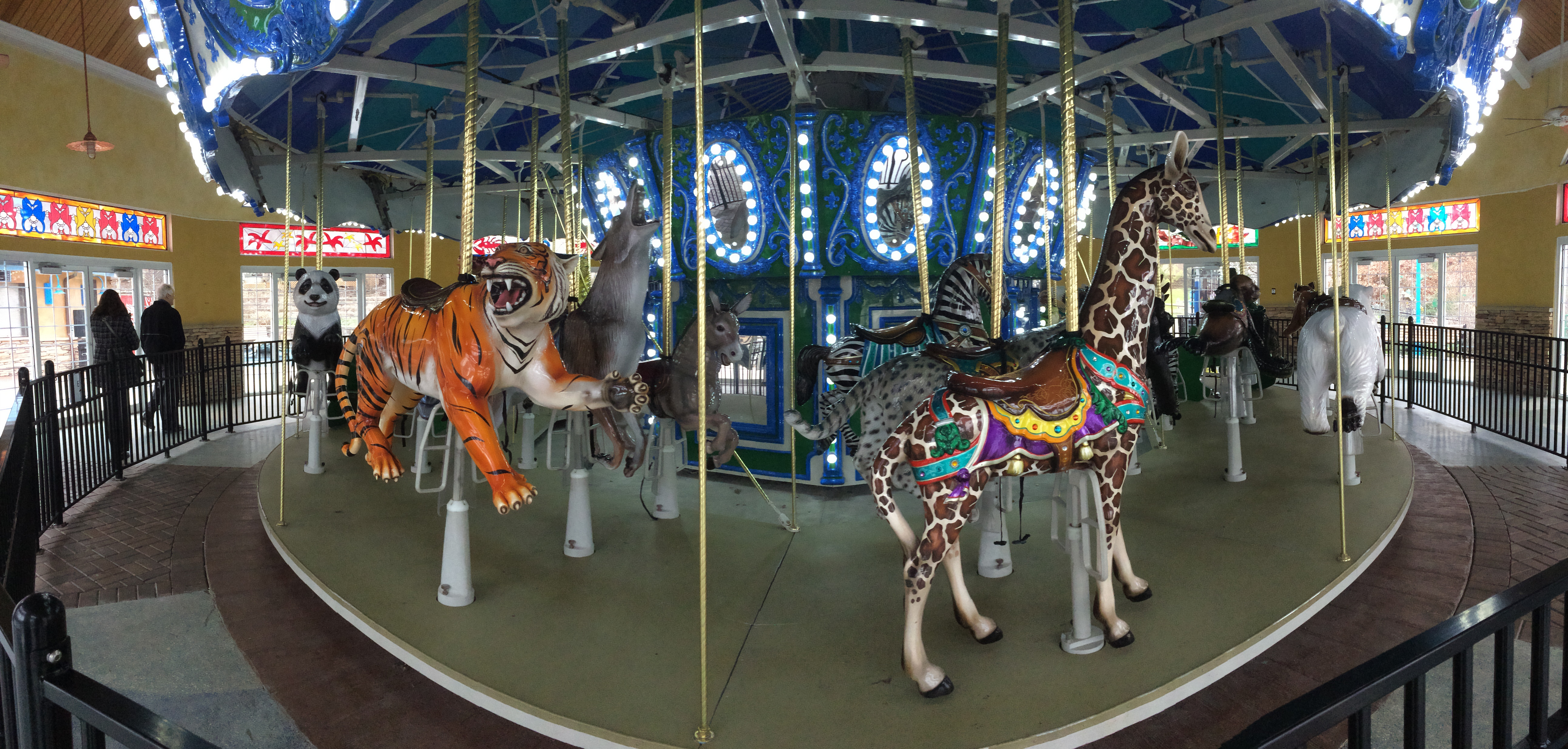
The train (above) and carousel (below) at Turtle Back Zoo

There are several attractions at the zoo, including a train ride, carousel, and playground. All the zoo's attractions are part of the South Mountain Recreation Complex.

The Turtle Back Zoo Railroad is a 2 ft (610 mm) narrow gauge railroad attraction that opened with the rest of the zoo in 1963. The railroad originally operated two S-24 Iron Horse trains manufactured by Allan Herschell. These were replaced in 1984 and 1999 by two C. P. Huntington trains manufactured by Chance Rides. In April 2015, the railroad received a third C. P. Huntington locomotive from a Livingston resident as part of a program to commemorate the 150th anniversary of Abraham Lincoln's death. From 2019 to 2020, the railroad was renovated to make room for a third parking deck, including a realignment of a portion of the route, a renovated platform, and a new train maintenance building. In 2020, Investors Bank (now merged with Citizens Bank, N.A.) became the official sponsor of the railroad.

The Endangered Species Carousel, a custom carousel built by Chance Rides and opened in 2008, is located inside a classic carousel house with mosaic floors and stained glass windows. Riders are seated on one of 30 endangered species, which includes pandas, alligators, and tigers.

On September 25, 2010, the Turtle Back Zoo opened the Essex County Safari MiniGolf course. Designed by French & Parrello Associates, P.A., the miniature golf course replicates three African regions: the Sahara Desert, the African Grasslands, and the Congo located to the center is Mount Kilimanjaro. The miniature golf course consists of 19 holes and contains various animal sculptures, such as a camel, an elephant, a gorilla, a lion and more.

In the following years, the zoo opened several more facilities, including the Treetop Adventure Ropes Course in September 2011, an education center in July 2014, and a new 15,000 square foot, $2 million, sea turtle recovery center in 2016.

A $2 million on-site veterinary hospital includes a full surgery suite, in addition to x-ray and ultrasound facilities. In May 2022, it was renamed as the “Essex County Barry H. Ostrowsky Animal Wellness Center”, in honor of the president and CEO of RWJBarnabas Health. Construction of a second hospital, which will share the same name as the first hospital, began in October 2023 and was completed in April 2025.

== Gallery ==
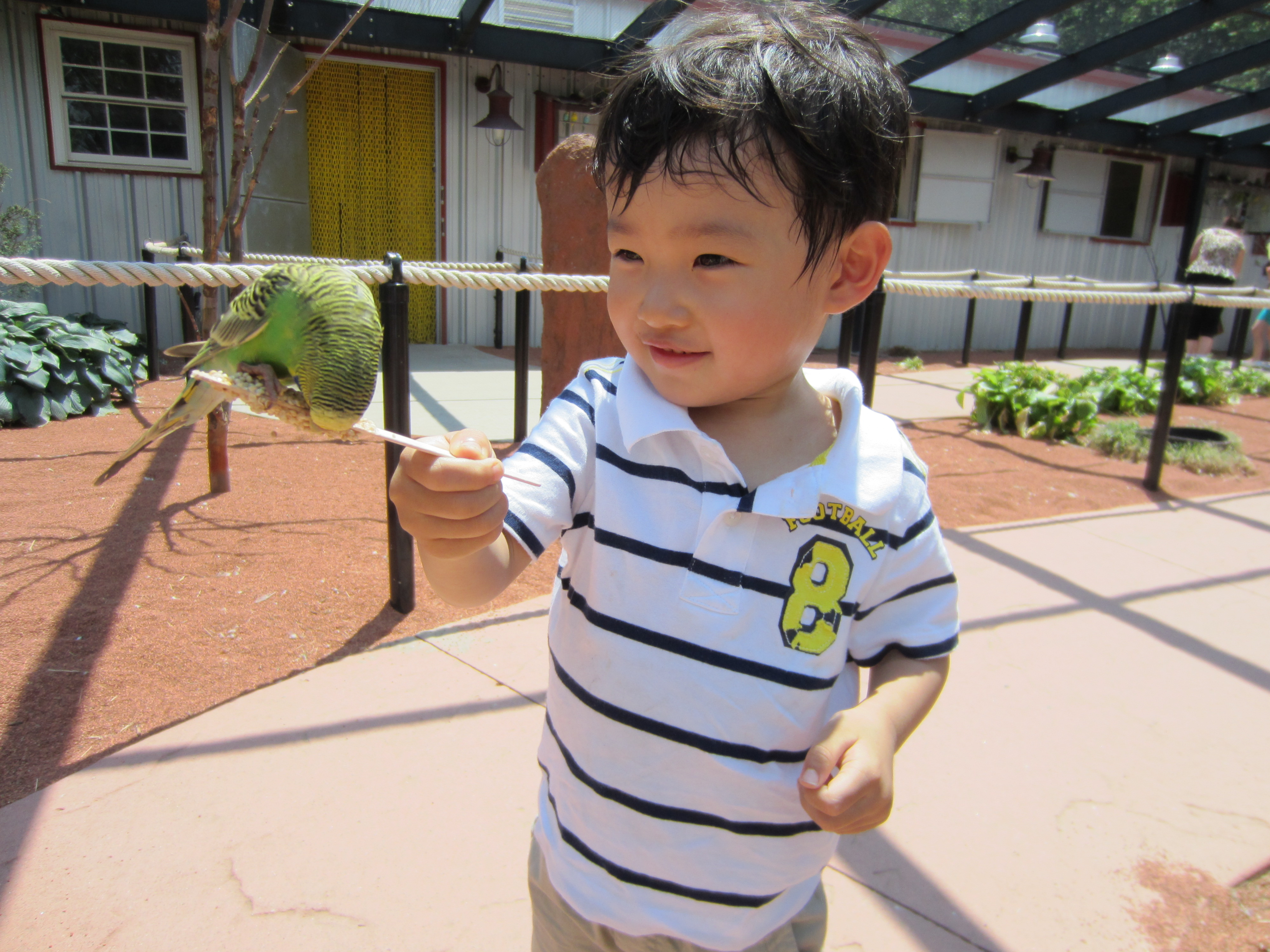
A bird being fed at the zoo by a child.

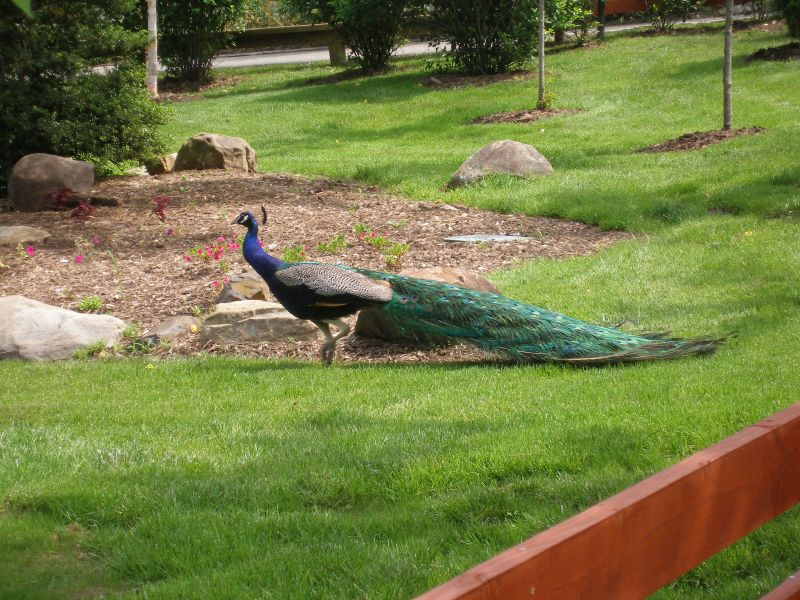
One of the zoo's peacocks, which used to roam freely within the zoo grounds.

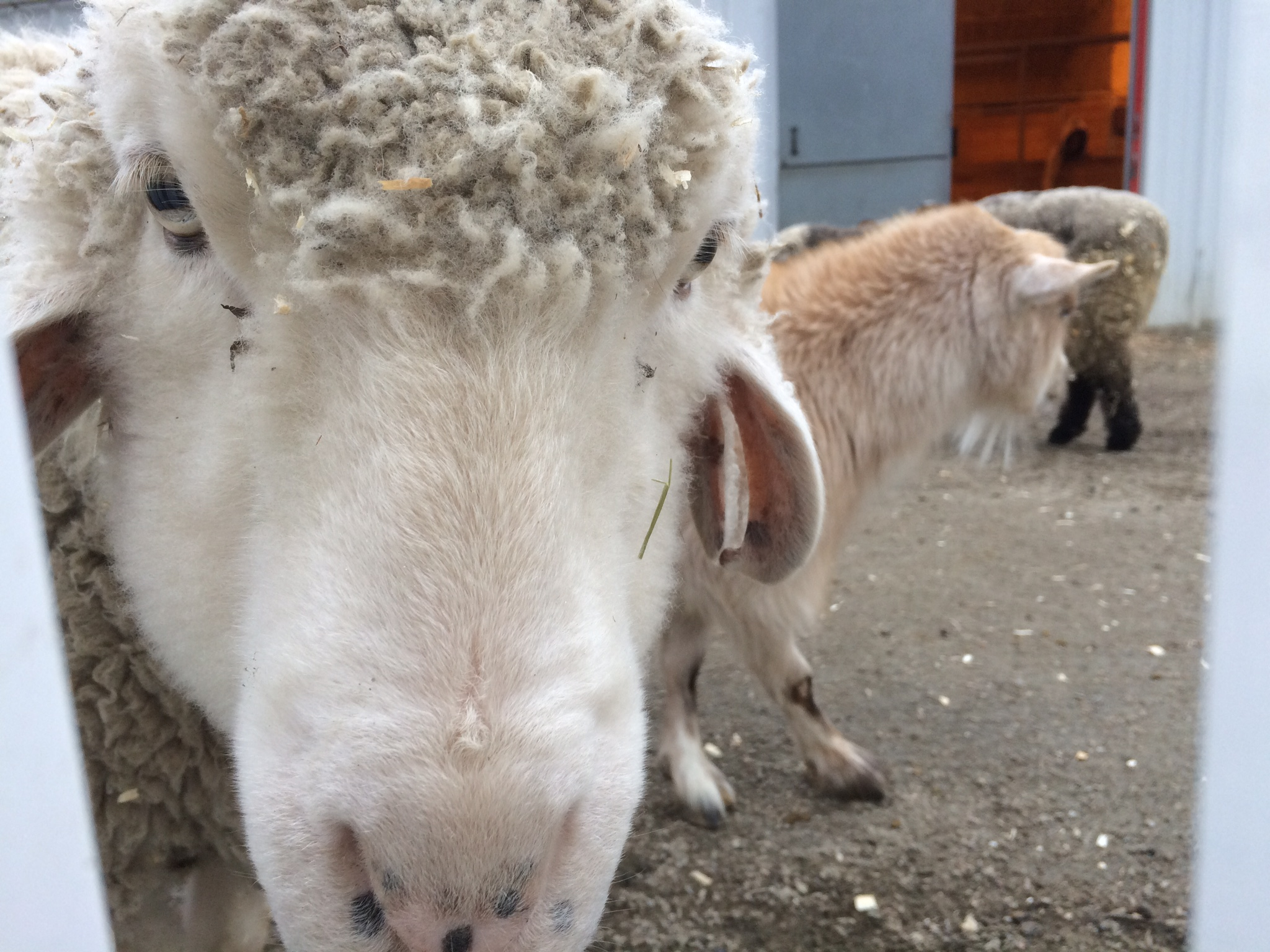
Sheep at the petting area of Essex Farm.

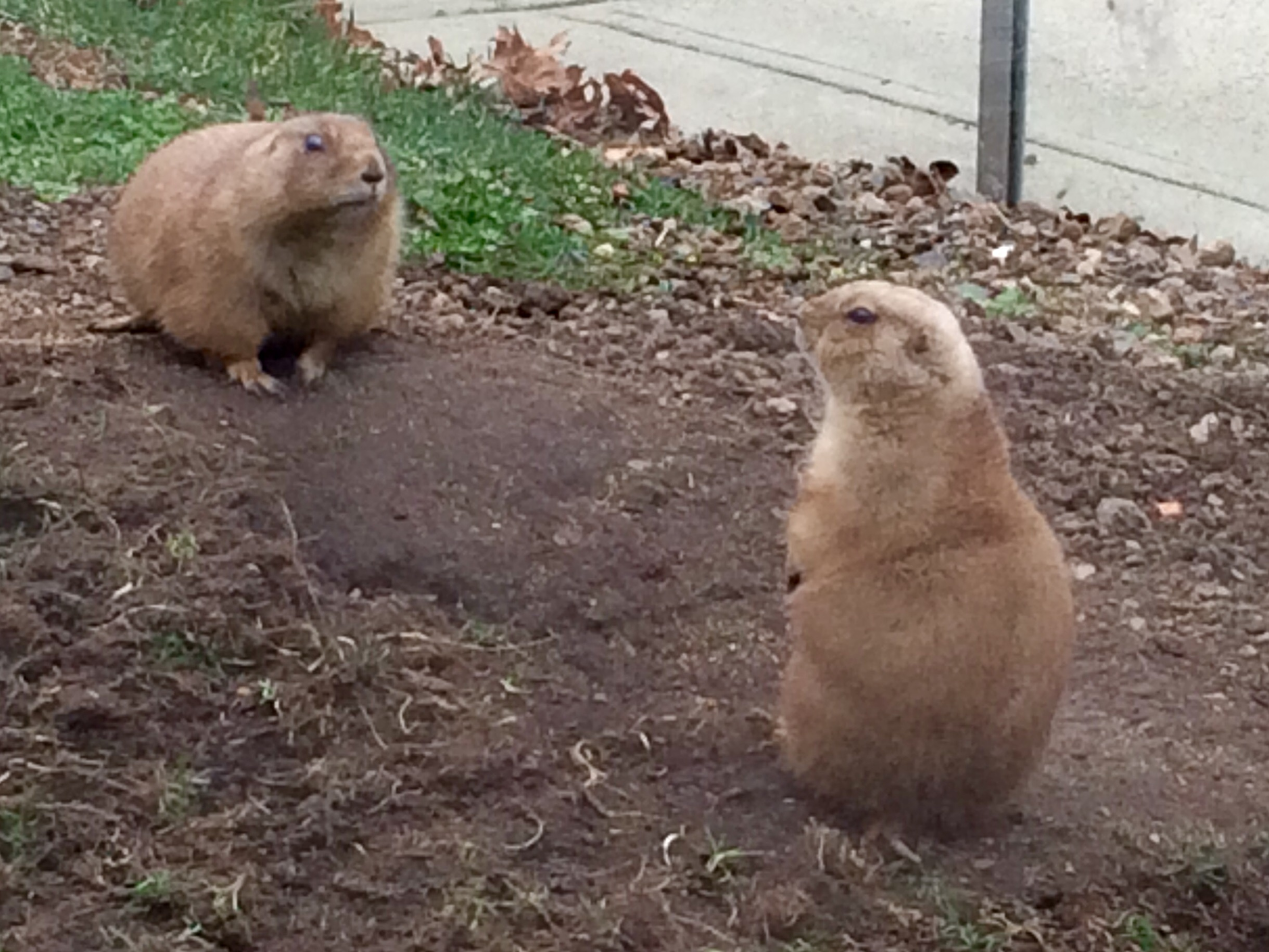
Prairie Dogs.

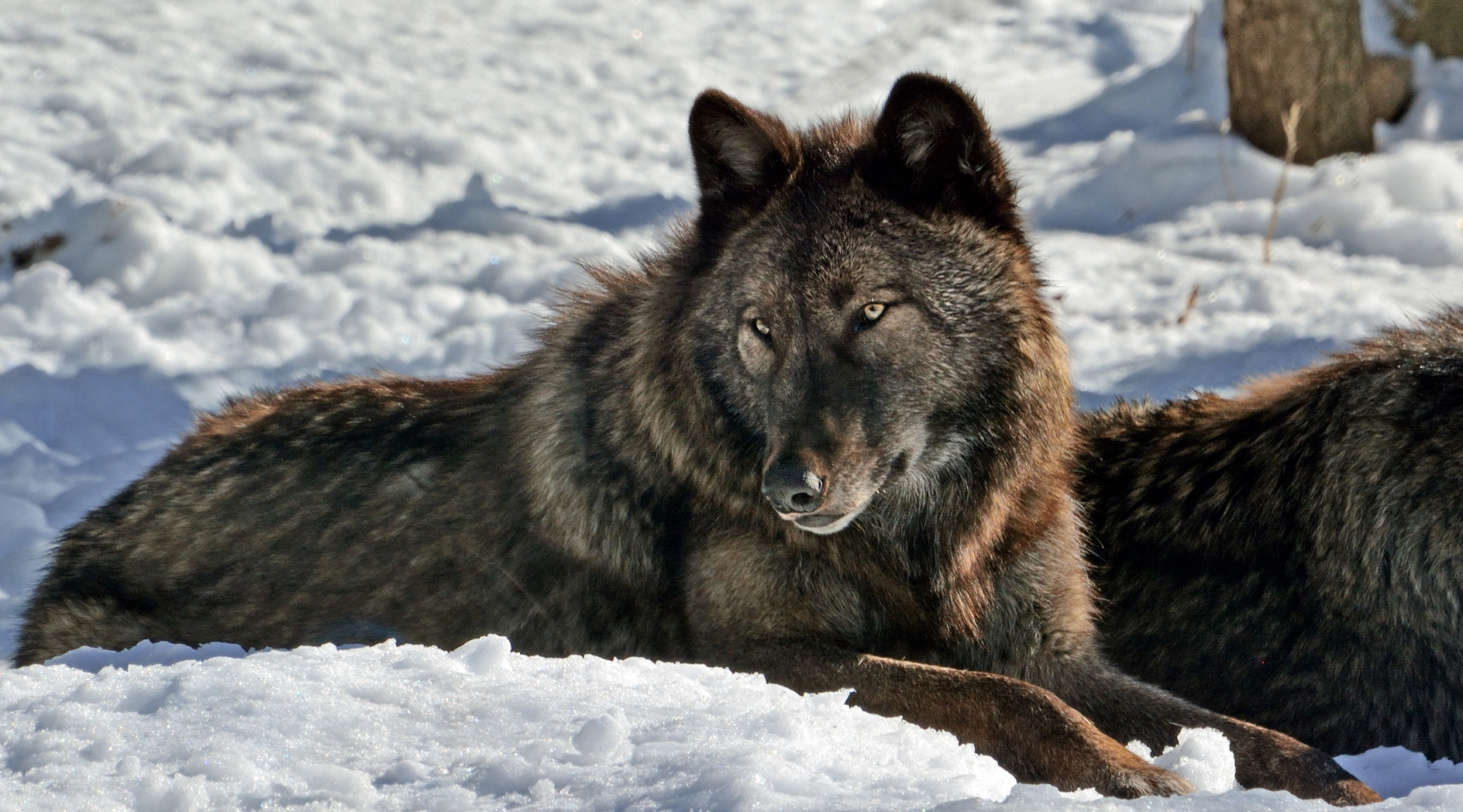
Gray wolf (Canis lupus).
