= South Mountain Recreation Complex =

Coordinates: 40.76956°N 74.281741°W

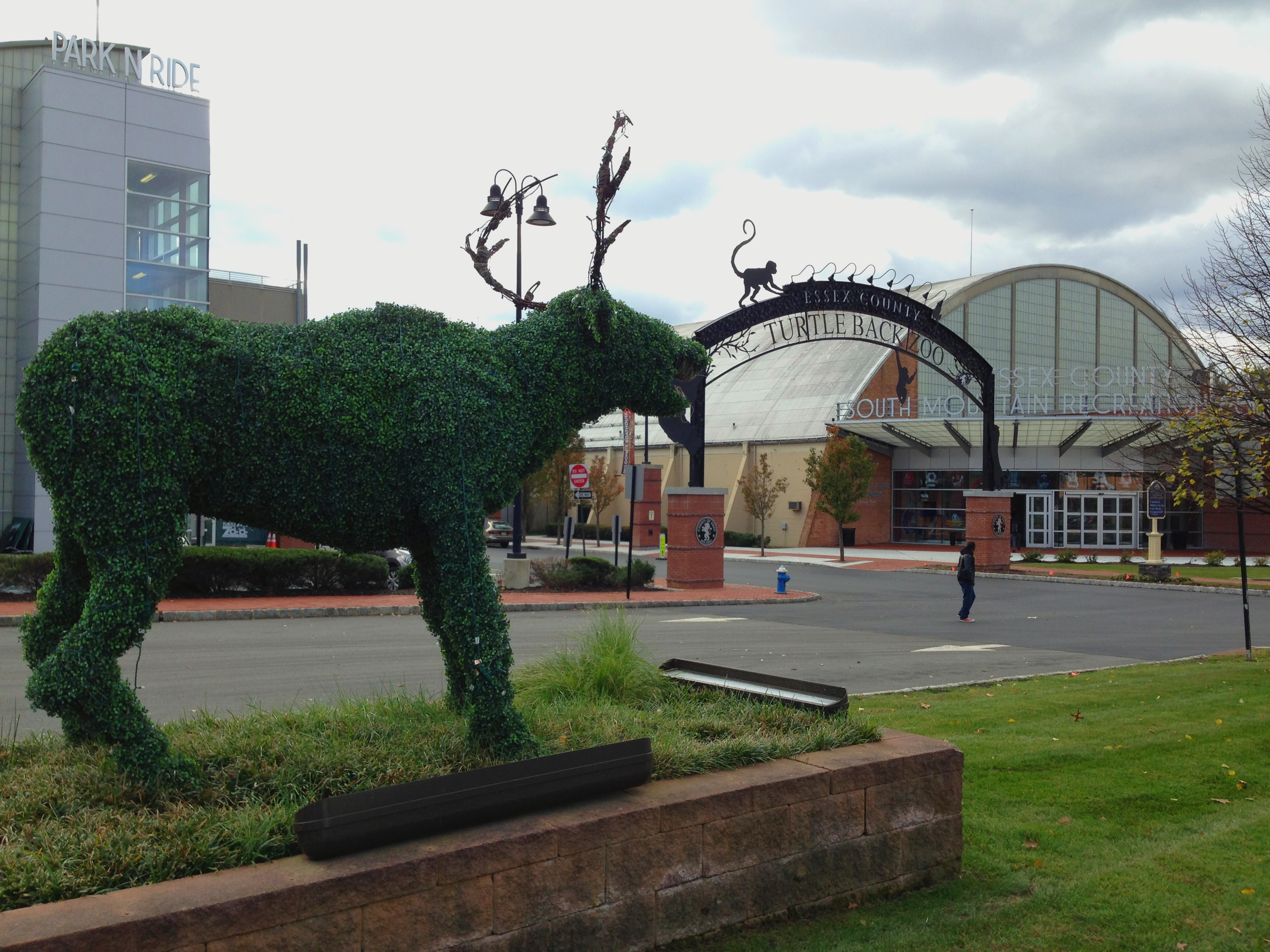
Entrance of South Mountain Recreation Complex

The South Mountain Recreation Complex is a 36-acre recreation facility in Essex County, located within the boundaries of the South Mountain Reservation in West Orange, New Jersey, United States. The complex is managed as part of the Essex County Park System. Activities at the complex include a zoo, ice skating/hockey rinks, a safari-theme miniature golf course, a forest adventure park, a restaurant, paddle boats, a nautical theme playground, and a 1.75 miles (2.82 km) walking loop around the Orange Reservoir.

== History ==
Prior to the formation of the South Mountain Recreation Complex, the north-western portion of the South Mountain Reservation had been home of the Turtle Back Zoo, the Richard J. Codey Arena and a park and ride facility.

In January 2010, the county announced the redevelopment plan for the undeveloped area near the arena to add a restaurant, mini-golf course and paddle-boat launching point, calling it the Essex County South Mountain Recreation Complex. The complex was later referred as South Mountain Recreation Complex.

The first phase of the redevelopment was completed in September 2010 with the opening of the golf course. The second phase was completed in 2011 with the creation of Treetop Adventure, the expansion of the zoo called Big Cat Country Exhibit and the opening of the restaurant. This phase of the project received both praise and criticism. The main critics were some of the 2011 Freeholder candidates and a union organization. The critics objected the use of county tax money on an investment to open a restaurant at the complex and the selection process of the restaurant.

The final phase of the redevelopment efforts was a construction of a boat launching facility which would allow boating at the Orange Reservoir. The project also called for a construction of a running path along the reservoir. However, the project was on hold as the county had not negotiated the purchase of the reservoir and its surrounding lands from the City of Orange. There were also other obstacles on county's attempts to purchase or lease the property including a lawsuit from the City of Orange on the damage claim due to the county's zoo operation and West Orange's claim of unpaid property tax. Eventually, the county was able to reach an agreement to lease the reservoir from the City of Orange until 2032.

== Activities ==
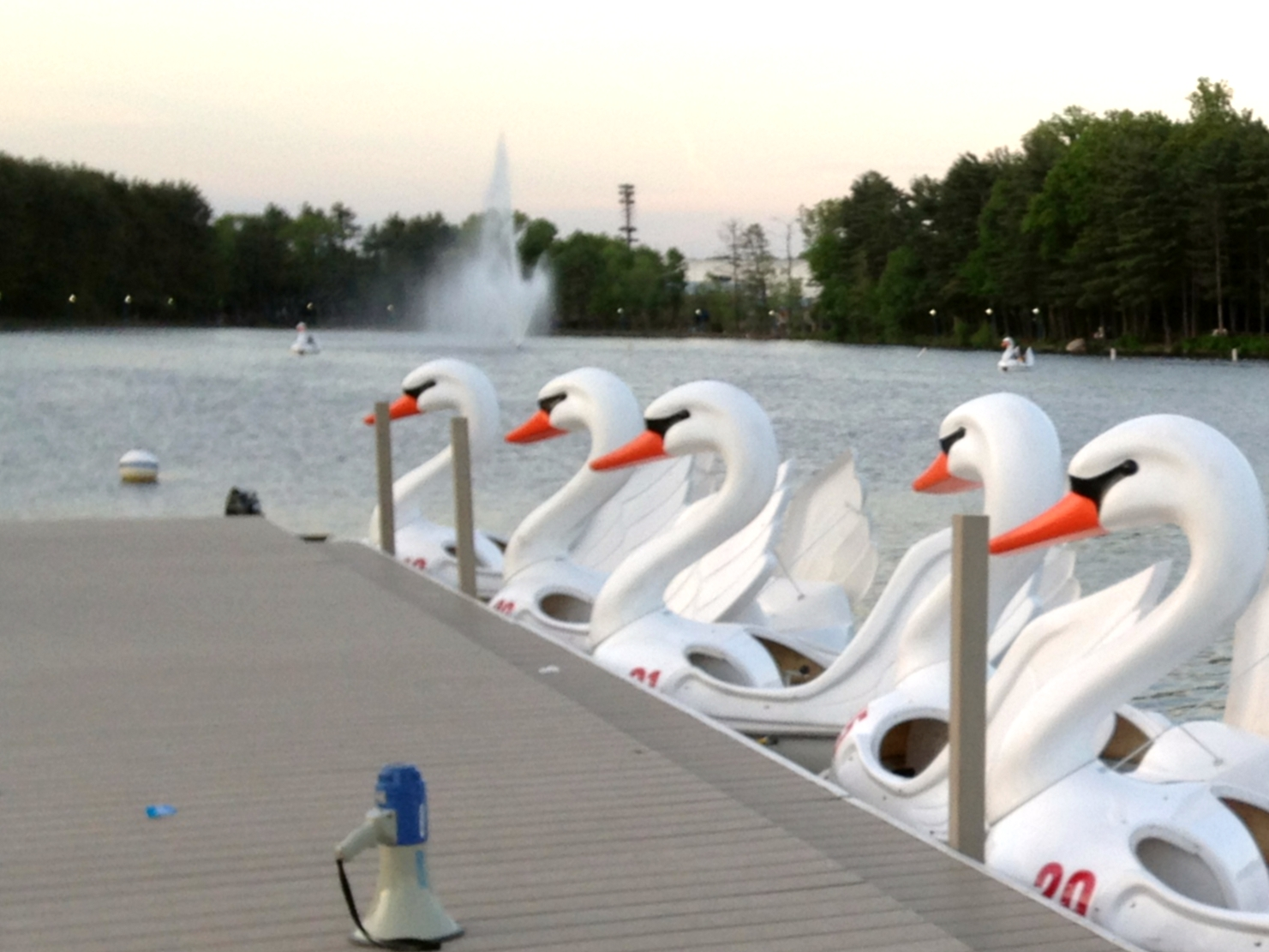
Essex County Paddle Boats

The complex offers the following recreational activities:

- Turtle Back Zoo is an 18-acre zoo with exhibits based on animal habitats such as Australian, South American and Southeast Asian exhibits. Other exhibits include the Big Cat Country, a reptile center, a train ride, a carousel, and a gibbon habitat.
- Richard J. Codey Arena is an ice hockey and ice skating arena with two NHL-sized skating rinks. The arena is the former practice facility of New Jersey Devils. It is the home of New Jersey Daredevils, a special needs hockey team; NJ Devils Youth Hockey Club; Essex Skating Club, a figure skating club with award-winning skaters and teams; and a home rink of Garden State Speedskating, a speed skating club sanctioned by US Speedskating.
- Essex County Safari MiniGolf is managed as part of the Turtle Back Zoo but has a separate entrance and admissions. This safari-themed miniature golf course has 19 holes complete with life-sized animal statues around and within the course.
- Essex County Treetop Adventure Course is a forest adventure park with 22 stations of rope bridges, zip lines, zigzag boards and logs and other obstacles with an average total time to complete the course of 90 minutes. The park is managed as part of the Turtle Back Zoo but has a separate entrance and admissions.
- McLoone's Boathouse is a 240-seat American cuisine restaurant on the banks of the Orange Reservoir.
- Paddle Boating and Picnic Pavilion is located on the Orange Reservoir with swan paddle boats for rent.
- Regatta Playground is a nautical themed playground for children.
- Orange Reservoir Walkway is a 1.75 miles (2.82 km) loop around the Orange Reservoir.
