= South Mountain Reservation =

Nature reserve in Essex County, New Jersey

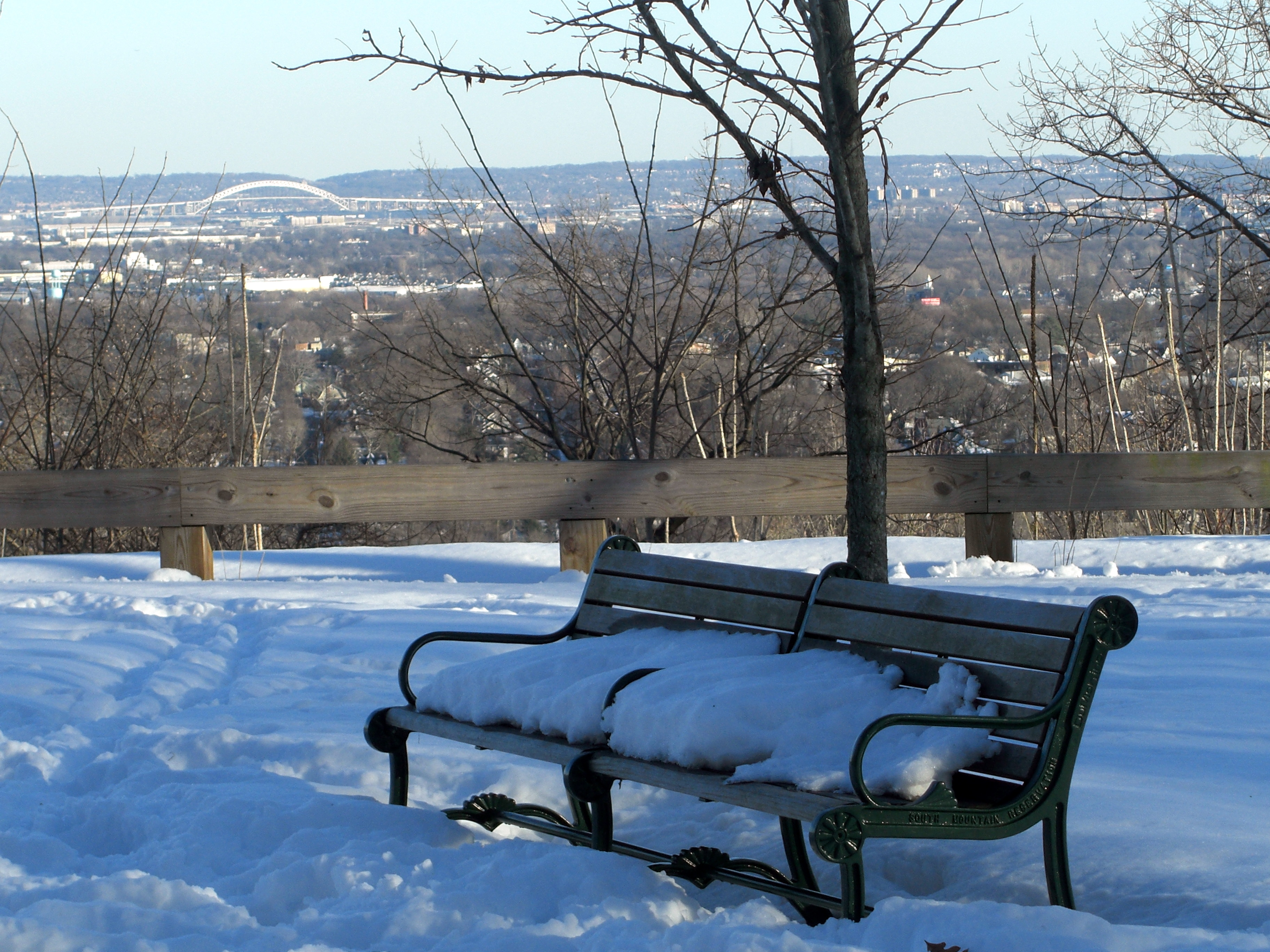
- Crater View

- Location within Essex County, New Jersey
- Nearest city: Newark, New Jersey
- Coordinates: 40°45′00″N 74°17′34″W
- Area: 2,047 acres (8.28 km^{2})
- Established: 1895
- Governing body: Essex County

South Mountain Reservation, covering between 2,047 and 2,112 acres (between 8.28 and 8.54 km^{2}), depending on the source, is a nature reserve on the Rahway River that is part of the Essex County Park System in northeastern New Jersey. It is located in central Essex County, New Jersey within portions of Maplewood, Millburn, and West Orange. It borders South Orange between the first and second ridges of the Watchung Mountains.

Carved from wilderness at the end of the 19th century, designed by Olmsted Brothers, and developed over a few decades, the reservation has changed only slightly through the years. Preserved primarily in its wild state, woodlands abound in a variety of hardwood trees, and tall hemlocks tower above streams, creeks and ponds, and waterfalls. Higher points, such as Crater View, offer vistas of the New York and Jersey City skylines, Elizabeth, Union Township, and Staten Island.

== Recreational complex ==
Richard J. Codey Arena and Turtle Back Zoo are located within the reservation's boundaries. The recreation area was expanded to include Safari Minigolf and the Treetop Adventure Ropes Course in 2010, and McLoone's Boathouse Restaurant abutting the Orange Reservoir was added in 2011. In 2013, a paddleboat concession was added, accessible from Cherry Lane, across from the Oakdale Picnic Area, and paths from the restaurant and zoo.

== Orange Reservoir ==
Orange Reservoir is a reservoir located in the reservation's northern tract. Within the borders of West Orange, it is owned by the City of Orange and operated and maintained under contract with United Water. It was originally developed during the intense urbanization of northeastern New Jersey in the late 19th century, drawing from the Rahway River. The man-made lake is no longer part of the water-supply system and since the late 2000s (decade) various proposals have been made to allow its use as a recreational resource as part of the Recreational Complex. The complex abutting the reservoir includes a miniature golf course, and a boathouse-restaurant opened in 2011. Proposals were complicated by the fact that while owned by one municipality, it lies within the borders of another, and it is unclear whether it is taxable. Offers by the Essex County Park System to buy or lease property were put in place as a possible resolution. The county was able to reach an agreement to lease the reservoir from the City of Orange until 2032. In November 2013 it was announced that bridges and other improvements for recreational use would be made.

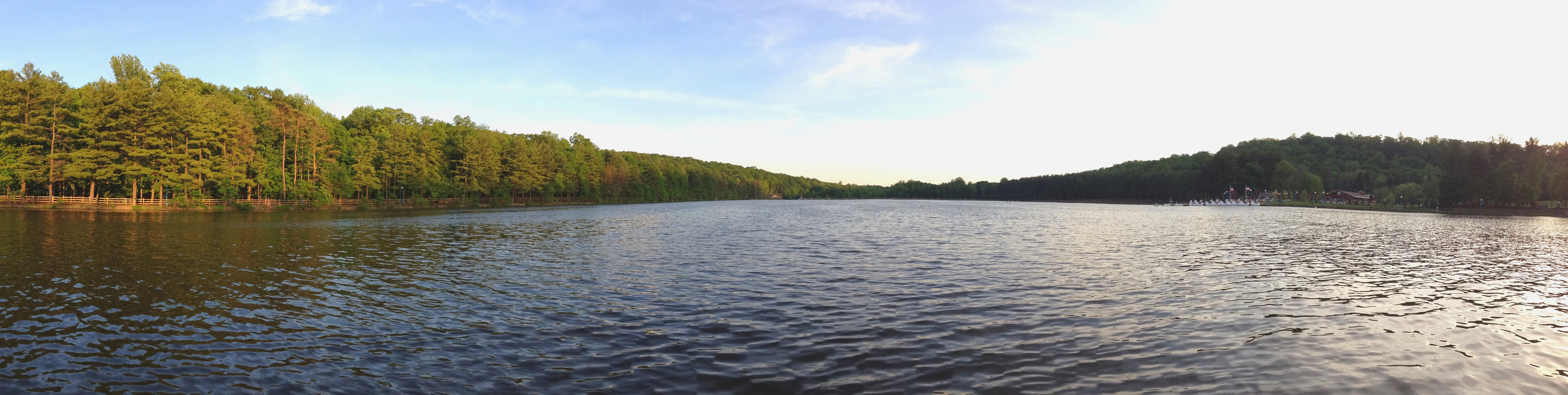
A panoramic view from the middle of the Orange Reservoir looking southward

== Dam proposal ==
There have been several proposals for easing the damage caused by heavy rains, which include damming the Rahway River, with headwaters in the reservation.

== History ==
=== Revolutionary era ===
Washington Rock is a Revolutionary War historic site, dating back to the late 18th century when Beacon Signal Station 9 was located here—one of 23 beacons built by General Washington to observe British troop movements quartered on Staten Island and New York City.

It was from this outlook that, on June 23, 1780, Essex County and Newark Militia were first warned that the British had launched an attack westward toward "the Gap", (Hobart Gap), a natural pathway to Washington's troops encamped at Morristown. In a pincer movement designed to gain access to the Gap, Hessian troops fought bitterly along Vaux Hall Road, while the British advanced along Galloping Hill Road, until they were repelled, the Hessians at the base of the mountain and the British in Springfield.

=== Development ===
In 1860, wolves, bears and cougars were observed in the area, and there was a bounty on them. In 1896, John Durand, the son of Asher Brown Durand, described the mountain that includes South Mountain Reservation

a wilderness, as it probably existed at the time of Hendrick Hudson, a primitive forest abounding with deer and other wild animals, and traversed by streams alive with trout. Game was plentiful—partridges, quail, woodcock, rabbits, squirrels of every species, raccoons and foxes; while occasionally a hungry bear that had trespassed on the farmyards in the vicinity would be tracked to its den and shot.

The reservation was built from land purchases begun in 1895. It took a decade to untangle the deeds and assemble all the lands at South Mountain. Before he delegated design of the Essex Parks to his stepson's firm, Frederick Law Olmsted visited the newly acquired reservation. He regarded it as some of the most beautiful and promising terrain he had ever seen anywhere. The design of South Mountain was finalized by the Olmsted Brothers in stages over the years. A good deal of construction work—trails, footbridges, shelters, etc.—was undertaken by the Civilian Conservation Corps in the 1930s.

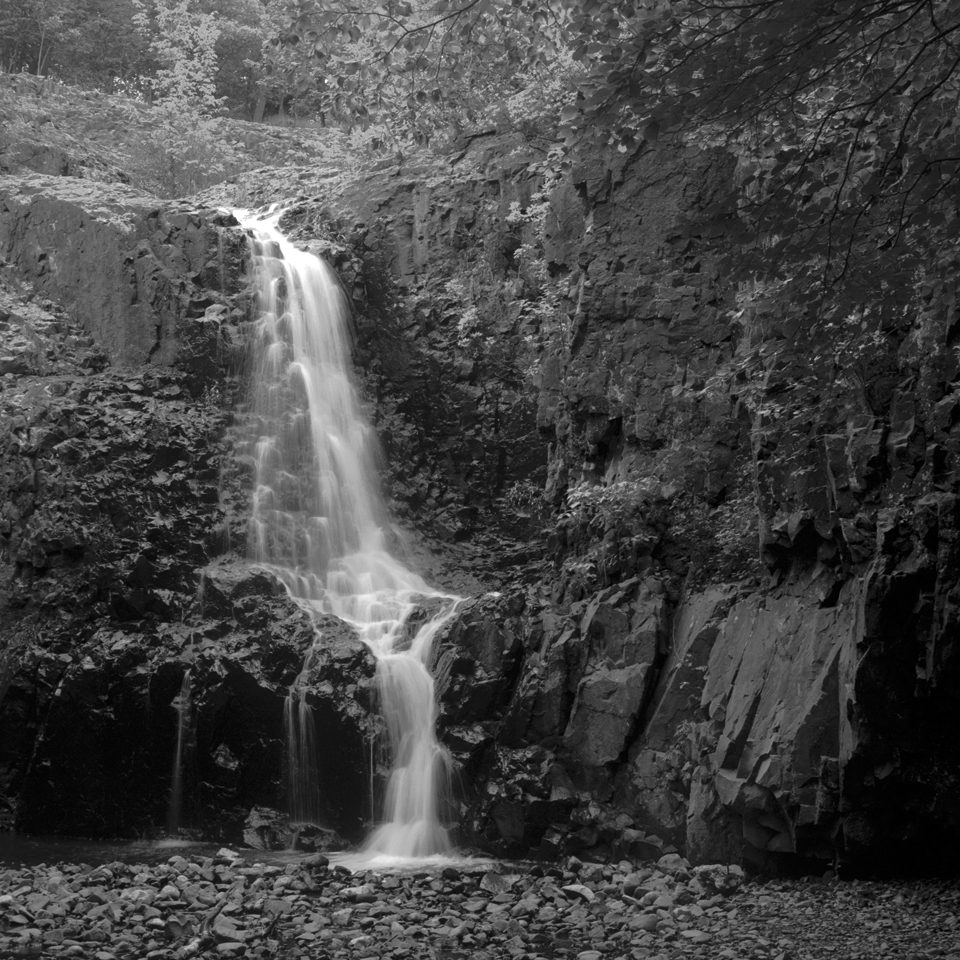
Hemlock Falls is a dramatic feature

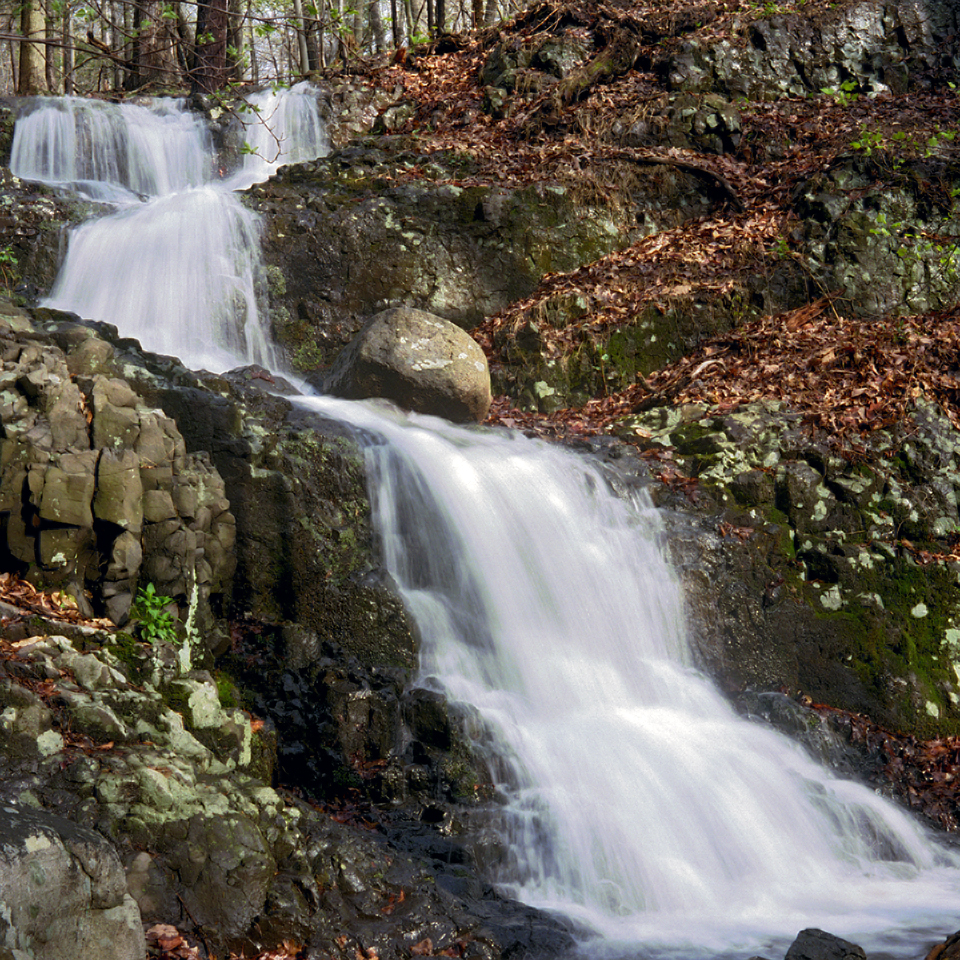
Blackrock Falls

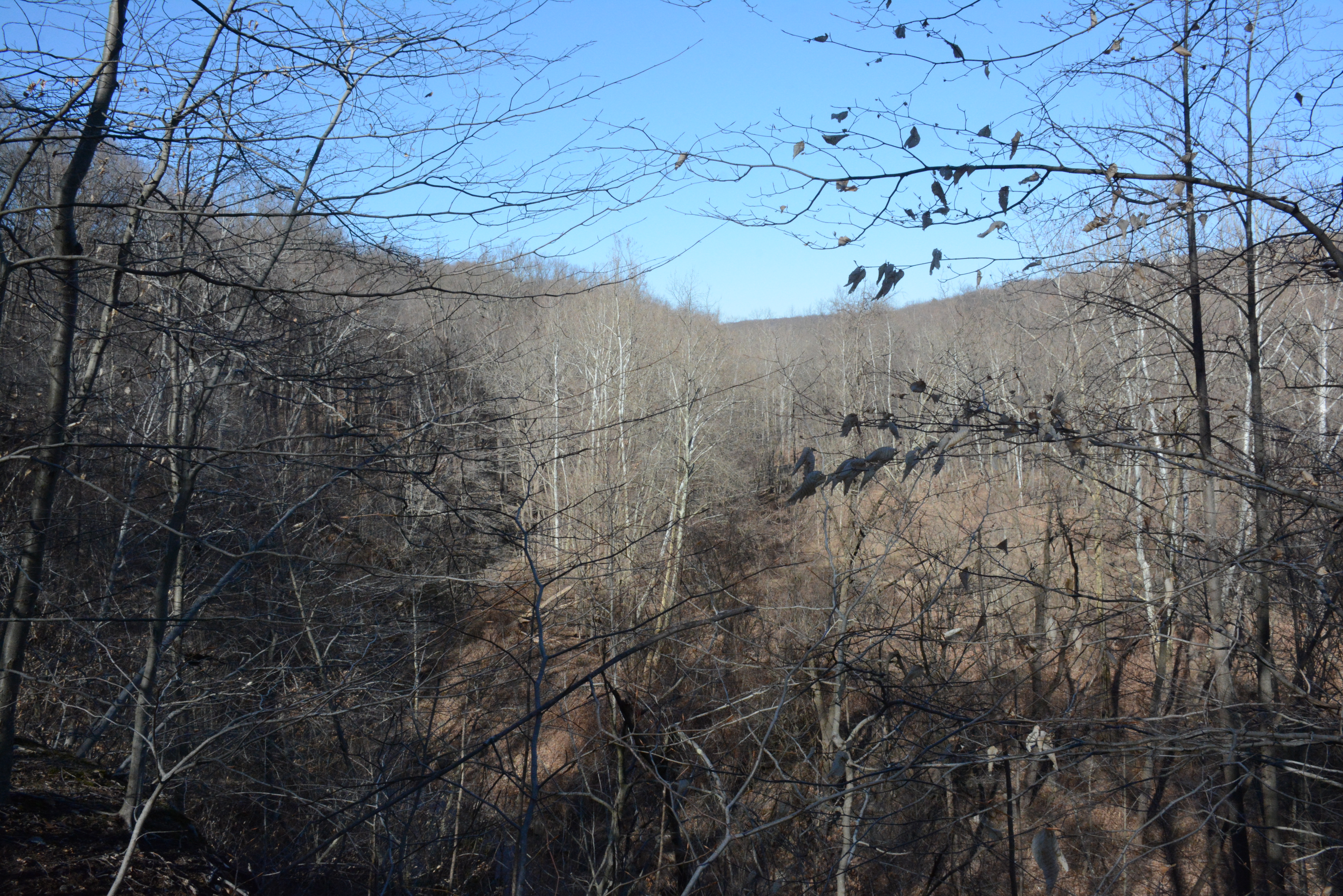
Painter's Point above the Rahway River

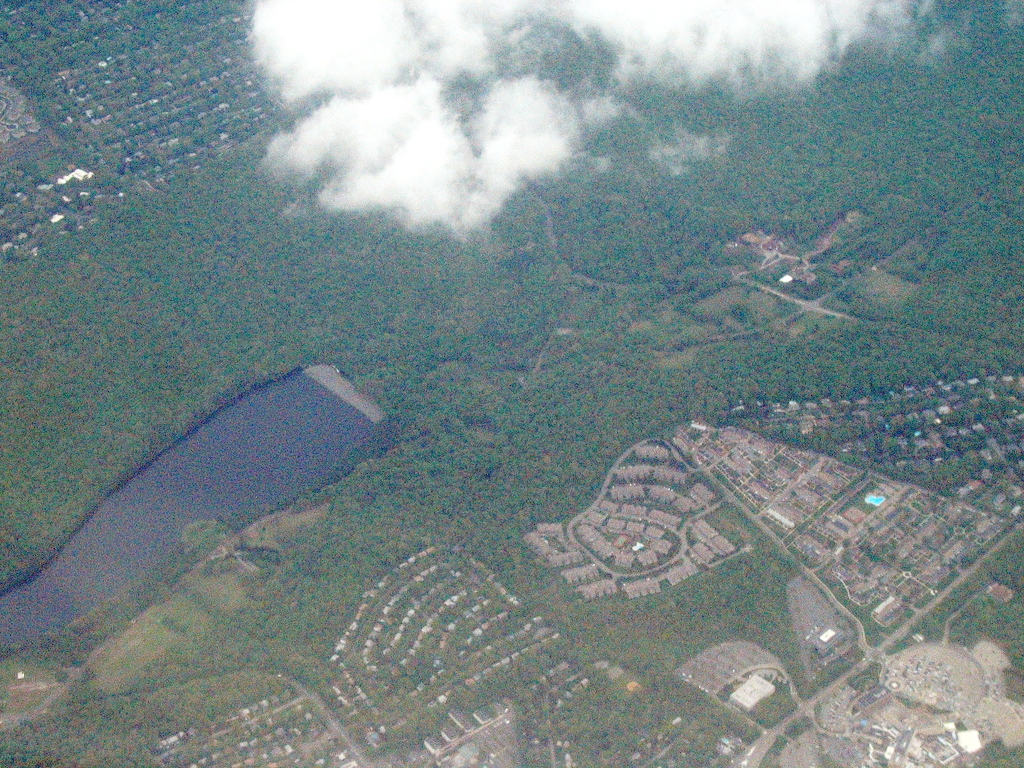
Aerial view of Orange Reservoir
