= Essex Skating Club =

Coordinates: 40°46′8″N 74°16′55″W

- Formation: 1954
- Headquarters: Richard J. Codey Arena
- Location: West Orange, New Jersey, USA
- President: Sally Saul

The Essex Skating Club (also known as ESC and Essex SC of NJ) is a figure skating club based at Richard J. Codey Arena in West Orange, New Jersey. The club has teams and over 300 skaters who compete in many national competitions.

== History ==
The Essex Skating Club was formed in 1954 at the Shady Brook outdoor rink in Livingston, New Jersey and it was sanctioned by U.S. Figure Skating in January 1955. The club moved from Livingston to Essex County's rink at the South Mountain Arena in West Orange. With the renovation in 2005 to modernize the arena, the club's home base was reopened with modern facility and the new name, Richard J. Codey Arena. Currently there are more than 300 members including 10 Synchro teams and 1 Theatre on Ice team.

== Skaters ==
Currently there are more than 300 skaters at the Essex Skating Club. Since its founding, skaters have competed in national and international competitions. Three Americans Suna Murray (1972), Elisa Spitz (1984), and Karen Courtland (1994) grew up skating in Essex Club’s Ice Shows and training at South Mountain Arena. They went on to capture many National and International medals including representing the United States in Figure Skating at the Winter Olympic Games and World Championships:

- Lynn Biot-Gordon, 2005 US Adult Nationals competitor and 2006 National Adult Figure Skating Championships Silver Medalist
- Stephanie Casagrande, 2012 US Preliminary Solo Ice Dance Champion
- Anya Davidovich & Ivan Gyliaev, 2009 National Showcase champion. Davidovich later became an Olympian representing Israel in the 2014 Winter Olympics.
- Dana Grant, 2010 National Showcase competitor
- Tori Mueller, Sabrina Oudine, and Stacey Su skated with the Skyliners at the 2012 Synchronized Skating Junior World Challenge Cup in Gothenburg, Sweden
- Tori Mueller, Sabrina Oudine, and Stacey Su skated with the Skyliners at the 2012 Premiere Cup in Rouen, France
- Olivia Yao, 2009 National Showcase medalist
- Katharine Zeigler, 2009-2011 US Figure Skating Championships competitors

Coaches at the club are among national and world competitors. Notable coaches include:

- Kay Barsdell, 1974-1978 member of British, European and World Team. 1976 Olympian.
- Oleg Bliakhman, 1982 Junior Worlds Silver Champion
- Ken Foster, 1974-1978 member British, European and World Team
- JoJo Starbuck, 1968-1972 Worlds competitors and two-time medalist. 1968 and 1972 Olympian.

== Teams ==
=== The Synchroettes ===
The Synchroettes is a group of synchronized skating teams of ESC. Currently the group consists of 10 teams from Beginner to Junior with 180 skaters. The Synchroettes teams won in many regional competitions and competed in national competitions for many years. They also performed in many public appearances and participated in community service skating events such as Toys for Tots and a show to benefit Susan G. Komen for the Cure. In 2010, its Juvenile team won the gold medal of the 2010 U.S. Synchronized Skating Championships in Minneapolis, Minnesota. The success of the Essex Skating Club's synchronized skating teams was recognized by the U.S. Figure Skating in its publication, Guide to Basic Skills and Beginner Synchronized Skating, as one of the two featured clubs to inspire skating clubs around the U.S. to start a basic skills/beginner synchronized skating program.

In 2012, the Junior-level team of Synchroettes was selected by the U.S. Figure Skating to be part of the Team USA for 2012-13 season to compete in Leon Lurje Trophy international competition in Sweden. The team won a bronze medal in the competition.

The founder and the head coach of the Synchroettes - Geri Lynch Tomich.

=== The Essex Blades ===
The Essex Blades is the adult synchronized skating team of the club. The team has been competing nationally in the Masters division at the U.S. Synchronized Skating Championships. The team placed 6th at the 2011 Championships.

=== Bravo! ===
Bravo! is a group of the Theatre on Ice (TOI) teams of ESC and the first TOI group in NJ. As of January 2016, it is the only NJ team among almost 50 teams in the US. In 2011, the team became pewter medalist for the Novice division at the US National Theatre on Ice Competition. In 2012, the team became national silver medalist for the novice division at the US National Theatre on Ice competition in Strongsville, Ohio. In 2012, the team was selected by US Figure Skating to be one of the two novice teams to represent the United States at the 2013 Nations Cup in Spain, and placed 9th out of 11 teams worldwide.

In 2013, there were two teams in preliminary and novice levels. The preliminary team was a national pewter medalist and the novice team was a national silver medalist for the 2013 US National Theatre on Ice competition in Troy, Ohio.

== Other activities ==
The Essex Skating Club has sponsored many skating events and clinics featuring famous skaters such as Olympic medalists and Disney on Ice skaters. It also hosts annual competition Winter ESCapade sanctioned by U.S. Figure Skating in January with competitors from clubs along the Northern parts of the East coast.
