= Richard J. Codey Arena =

Ice skating arena in West Orange, New Jersey

- Codey Arena
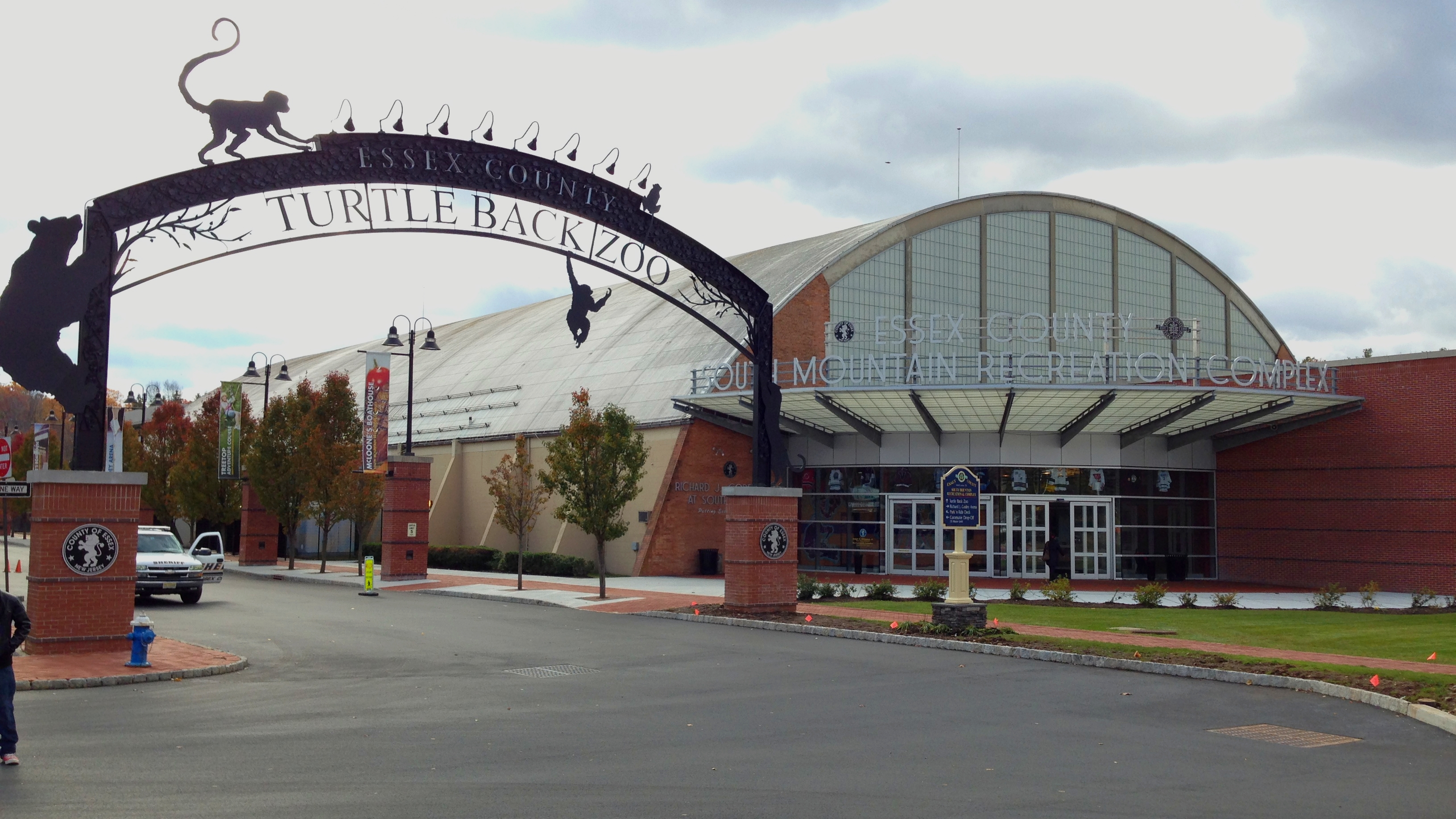
- The Richard J. Codey Arena with the Turtle Back Zoo entrance arch.
- Interactive map of Richard J. Codey Arena
- Former names: South Mountain Arena (1958–2004)
- Location: West Orange, New Jersey
- Coordinates: 40°46′8″N 74°16′55″W
- Owner: Essex County Department of Parks and Recreation
- Capacity: 2,500 (Rink 1), 500 (Rink 2)
- Surface: Ice, Floor (Rink 1 can be configured for non ice purposes also)
- Public transit: NJT Bus: 73; Community Coach Bus: 77; OurBus: Livingston/West Orange

Construction
- Opened: 1958

Tenants
- NJ Devils Youth Hockey; Essex Skating Club; New Jersey Daredevils (2002–present); New York Sirens (PWHL, practice facility) (2024–present); New Jersey Gems (WBL) (1980–1981); New Jersey Devils (NHL, practice facility) (1986–2007); Jersey Rockhoppers (EPHL) (2008–2009); Seton Hall Pirates (ACHA) men's ice hockey Seton Hall Prep Pirates (NJSIAA) men's ice hockey West Orange Mountaineers (NJSIAA) men's ice hockey Livingston Lancers (NJSIAA) men’s ice hockey Upsala College (ECAC - NCAA DIV.III) men’s ice hockey 1978-1994

The Richard J. Codey Arena at South Mountain (formerly the South Mountain Skating Arena) is an ice hockey and ice skating arena in West Orange, New Jersey, as part of the South Mountain Recreation Complex. The arena is named for former Governor of New Jersey Richard Codey. The Codey Arena is owned and operated by the Essex County Department of Park, Recreation, and Cultural Affairs.

== History ==
South Mountain Skating Arena opened in 1958 with a single ice rink with arena seating surrounding the rink. A second outdoor rink was built temporarily and used each winter beginning in the mid-1970s. The second rink was permanently enclosed in 1983. During 2004 and 2005 the arena underwent major renovations that included a new state-of-the-art lobby for the arena including meeting rooms, a skylight, automatic doors, pro shop (now a glice training area), arcade (now a vending machine area), and concession stand. Another part of the renovation was a new set of dasher boards, Plexiglas, compression system, jumbotron screen, and seats for Rink 1, as well as a new dehumidifier for Rink 2; it was renamed the Codey Arena upon reopening. In 2017, management announced that Rink 1 would undergo renovation once again putting in new seats, new boards, and a new jumbotron/scoreboard. In the fall of 2018, the arcade was replaced by vending machines. The arena has two NHL-sized skating rinks. The main arena has a seating capacity of 2,500 and the second rink seats approximately 500.

== Hockey ==
Many high school, college and semi-professional (NJ Rockets) ice hockey games have been played at the rink beginning in the 1960s. From 1986 until the opening of the Prudential Center (which includes a full-size practice rink) in 2007, the New Jersey Devils used the arena as the team's practice facility. In November 2008 it became home to the Jersey Rockhoppers of the Eastern Professional Hockey League. The arena is also home to the New Jersey Daredevils, a special needs hockey team that has practices and home games at the arena since 2002. The Daredevils play in the (ASHA) American Special Hockey Association League. Since 2009, The Daredevils host an annual Halloween hockey tournament in October for all Special Hockey International Teams (including the Daredevils) called Frankenfest. The New Jersey Devils Youth Hockey club is also based at the arena with more than twenty teams from the beginners entry level to the highly competitive AAA USA Hockey Sanctioned level. The Seton Hall University and the Seton Hall Preparatory School men's hockey teams also compete at the arena. Livingston High School hockey and West Orange High School hockey also play at the arena.

On September 13, 2024, the New York Sirens of the Professional Women's Hockey League (PWHL) announced as part of their move to the Prudential Center, they would make the arena their practice facility.

== Ice skating ==
The arena offers many classes at different levels from toddlers to adults. There are also public sessions available during weekdays and weekends.

=== Essex Skating Club ===
The Essex Skating Club (ESC) is the figure skating club at the arena. The club has more than 300 youth and adult members with winning records at national competitions. A number of coaches at ESC are World and Olympic competitors such as Kay Barsdell, Ken Foster and JoJo Starbuck. Three Americans grew up skating in Essex Club’s Ice Shows and training at the arena. Suna Murray (1972), Elisa Spitz (1984), and Karen Courtland (1994) represented the United States in Figure Skating at the Winter Olympic Games and World Championships. Oleg Bliakhman also coaches and he competed representing Russia in the 1982 and 1983 Junior World Figure Skating Championships. The Synchroettes are youth synchronized skating teams with winning records including regional champions and the gold medal at the 2010 U.S. Synchronized Skating Championships. In 2012, the Junior-level team of Synchroettes was selected by the U.S. Figure Skating to be part of the Team USA for 2012–13 season to compete in Leon Lurje Trophy international competition in Sweden. The Essex Blades is an adult synchronized skating team which ranked 6th at the 2011 U.S. Synchronized Skating Championships. Bravo! is a Novice Theatre on Ice team which ranked 4th at the 2011 US National Theatre on Ice Competition. In 2012, Bravo! was selected by US Figure Skating to be one of the two Novice teams to represent the United States at the 2013 Nations Cup in Spain.

=== Garden State Speedskating ===
The Garden State Speedskating is one of 70 speed skating clubs and the only club in New Jersey sanctioned by US Speedskating. The Garden State Speedskating has two home rinks. The home rink at Richard J. Codey Arena offers Learn to Speed Skating program for all skating levels.

== Other usage ==
Many skating shows have taken place on the ice over the decades. Olympians Peggy Fleming, Dorothy Hamill, Janet Lynn, John Curry, Suna Murray, Karen Courtland, Elisa Spitz, and many others performed here to sold out crowds in the spectacular ice show productions of the 1970s, 1980s, and 1990s. The arena has been used in non-ice sport tournaments such as Essex County Tournament of high school wrestling, and other events such as graduation ceremonies. Concerts by nationally renowned bands were held here in the 1970s. The arena is also a site of emergency shelters for the county in the time of natural disasters. Occasionally, a rink is rented out for private entities, for instance, using it as a filming location for a Super Bowl commercial.

The arena was also home to the New Jersey Gems of the Women's Professional Basketball League during the Gem's third and final season of play in 1980–81.

== Public transportation ==
New Jersey Transit bus 73 serves the arena, Turtle Back Zoo, and the South Mountain recreational complex. There are two commuter bus lines from the arena to New York City, Community Coach bus 77, and OurBus Livingston/West Orange.
