= Ice theatre =

Discipline of figure skating

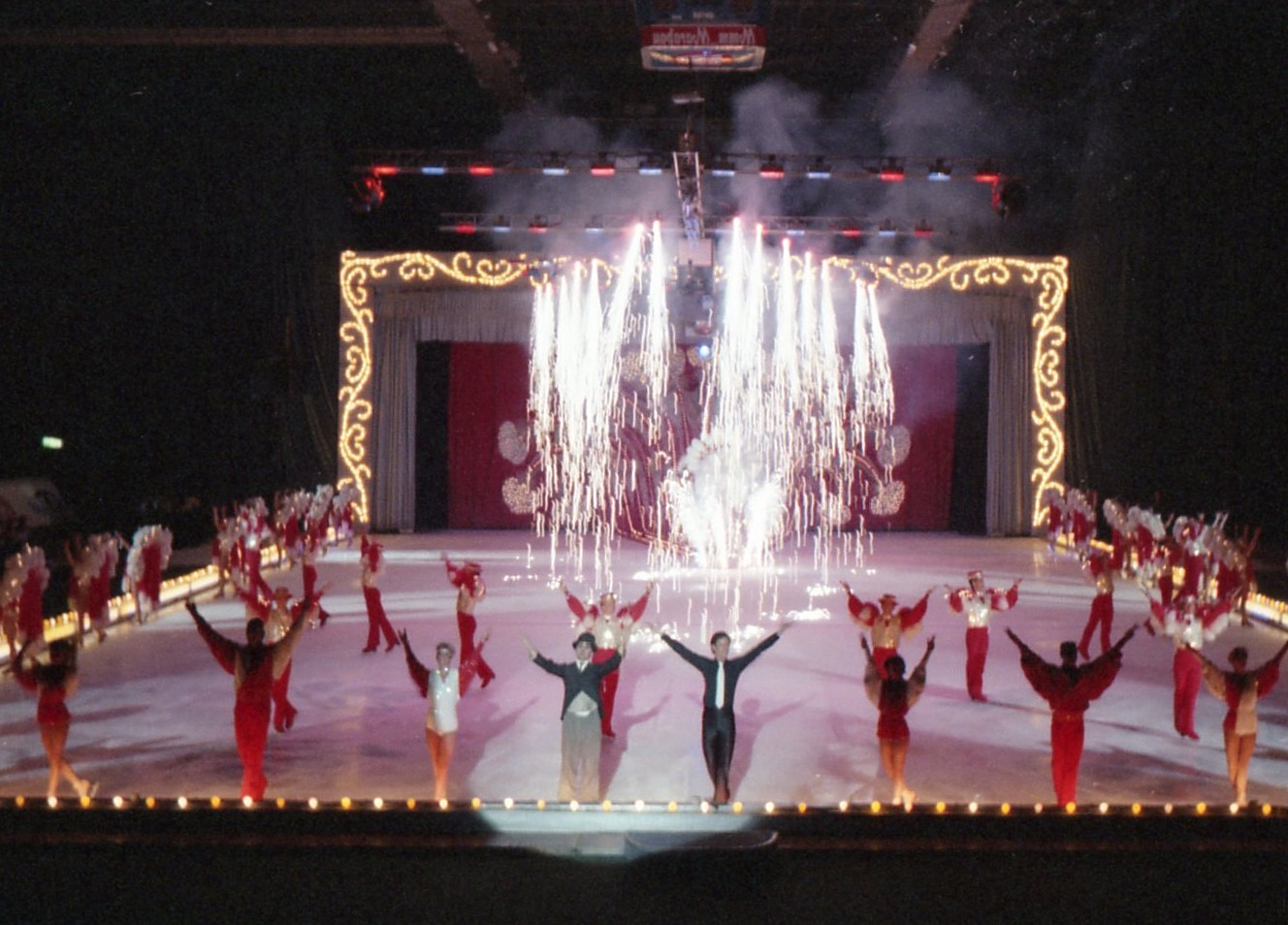
Ice theatre may refer to both a competitive discipline as well as professional skating ensembles, such as Holiday on Ice (pictured), which is a theatrical ice show.

Ice Theatre (also known as Theatre on Ice, TOI, and Ballet on Ice) is a branch of figure skating that merges technical jumps and spins with choreography, ice dancing, pairs moves, synchronized skating, and theater to tell a story or act out an emotion or idea. It is a relatively new branch of figure skating, but it is growing quickly. Ice Theatre brings out the more artistic side of figure skating.

This article focuses on ice theatre as a competitive discipline for amateur or recreational skaters. "Ice Theatre" can also refer to professional skating ensembles such as the John Curry Company, Ice Theatre of New York, The Next Ice Age, Seattle Ice Theatre, Ice-Semble Chicago and American Ice Theatre that perform classical ballet and modern dance on ice in a concert or show setting, much like a professional dance troupe. These companies are typically organized as not-for-profit and provide community outreach and education programs.

== Teams ==
Each ice theatre group is known as a team. When competing at the national level Senior, Junior, Novice, Preliminary and Adult teams may have a maximum of 24 skaters or as few as 8 skaters (at the international level there is a maximum of 20 skaters and a minimum of 12 skaters). Open teams are limited to a maximum of 20 skaters, and Special Olympic teams are limited to a maximum of 14. Each team member brings their skating specialty to the team, whether it be jumping, spinning, dancing, emotions, or other elements.

Each team must also have a coach, and in some cases a choreographer, who designs the routine. In addition, each team must have a manager or coordinator, someone who is in charge and makes plans for the team's competitions and practice sessions. Often it is also helpful for a team to be connected with a skating club, which they represent, in order to receive funding and support.

To join an ice theatre team one must have strong skating abilities, and they must have passed at least one moves in the field skating test, typically through the USFSA, U.S. Figure Skating. In addition, each team must compete at a certain level, either Basic Skills, Preliminary, Juvenile, Open, Intermediate, Novice, Junior, Senior, or Adult. This is decided based upon the figure skating test levels of the skaters on the team. Although the skaters on the team may be at a different level than the one which they are competing at, a certain percentage of the team must be composed of skaters that fit the level requirements.

== Routines ==
In figure skating, a routine is known as a program. In the program, singles skating, pairs, ice dance, and synchronized skating may be used. In addition, the program must tell a story or act out an emotion or idea. This is done through the technical elements as well as the emotions and body movements of the skaters.

Each routine is set to music of the team's choosing, which complements the theme of the routine well. This music may be instrumental or it may have words, however, the music must be tasteful and not contain any use of foul language.

Next, each routine requires costumes that fit the theme. They may be unique, and teams are encouraged to do so. However, these costumes must also be in good taste and may not be revealing. The costumes help to act out the theme, just as in a play performed on the stage.

Finally, each routine will most likely have props to help act out the theme as well as a set, to transport the audience to the place and time being portrayed on the ice. Both of these are optional, but are typically encouraged for teams to use both of these things to help express their theme.

An additional type of routine is called a choreographic exercise. This is a new type of program that is being developed. Each year, the requirements for this program change. In this type of program no sets or props or unique costumes are allowed. Each team must only wear black, from neck to ankle, with hair in pony tail and no visible makeup.

== Competitions ==
The International Skating Union does not regulate international competition in this discipline of skating, yet there are formal national championships in countries such as the United States each year. Currently, each season's rules for ice theatre competitions are set as the result of a collaboration between coaches of participating teams.

During competition, the teams perform their routines in a randomly selected order. Before the competition, they typically have a two- to five-minute warm-up period where they have time to bring the sets and props out and warm-up on the moves that they will be performing in the routine. Then the performance begins. During a competition, skaters typically wear make-up to create a more dazzling look for themselves and show off the character or theme they are portraying.

=== European competitions ===
Although not sanctioned by the ISU, competitions are held in France, Spain, Russia and other parts of Europe. Trophée International d’Occitane and La Griffe d'Argent are a couple notable French competitions.

=== US competitions ===
The Annual International Theatre on Ice Competition was held in various US cities for fifteen years. It was sanctioned by U.S. Figure Skating and teams from around the world were welcome to attend. In 2008, the 13th International Theatre on Ice Competition was held together with the 1st US National Theatre on Ice Competition. The dual competitions were held together until the 3rd National Theatre on Ice Competition and 15th Annual International Theatre on Ice Competition. Since then, U.S. Figure Skating has continued holding Nationals but discontinued the international event. Instead, top teams at each US Nationals are selected to be representatives at the new worlds competition, Nations Cup.

=== Nations Cup ===
The first worlds competition was held in Toulouse, France in April 2010 called the Nations Cup with almost 500 skaters from seven countries. The second Nations Cup was held in Hyannis, Massachusettsthe third Nations Cup was held in Logroño, Spain in April 2013, and the fourth Nations Cup was held in Colombes, France in April 2015.The fifth Nations Cup was held in Ann Arbor, Michigan, in April 2017. The sixth Nations Cup was held in Epinal, France, in April 2019. The seventh Nations Cup was held in Norwood, Massachusetts, in April 2023. The eighth Nations Cup was held in Bordeaux, France, in April 2024.
